= 2003–04 Big East Conference men's basketball season =

American college basketball season

2003–04 Big East Conference Men's Basketball Season
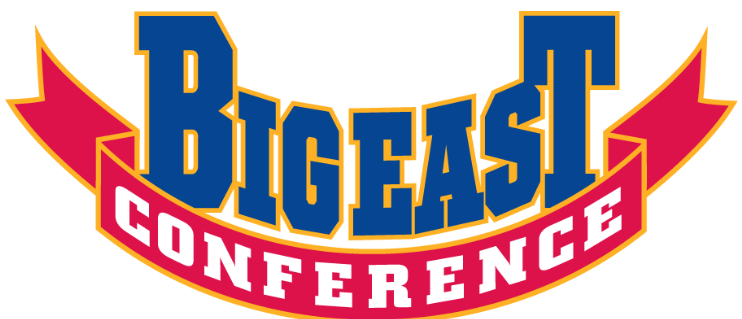
- League: NCAA Division I
- Sport: Basketball
- Duration: November 13, 2003 through March 13, 2004
- Teams: 14
- TV partner: ESPN

Regular Season
- Champion: Pittsburgh (13–3)
- Season MVP: Emeka Okafor – Connecticut

Tournament
- Champions: Connecticut
- Finals MVP: Ben Gordon – Connecticut

Basketball seasons
- 2002–03 2004–05

2003–04 Big East men's basketball standings
| | Conf. | | | | Overall |
| Team | W | | L | PCT | W | | L | PCT |
|---|---|---|---|---|---|---|---|---|
| No. 9 Pittsburgh | 13 | – | 3 | .813 | 31 | – | 5 | .861 |
| No. 7 Connecticut † | 12 | – | 4 | .750 | 33 | – | 6 | .846 |
| No. 21 Providence | 11 | – | 5 | .688 | 20 | – | 9 | .690 |
| No. 20 Syracuse | 11 | – | 5 | .688 | 23 | – | 8 | .742 |
| No. 25 Boston College | 10 | – | 6 | .625 | 24 | – | 10 | .706 |
| Seton Hall | 10 | – | 6 | .625 | 21 | – | 12 | .636 |
| Notre Dame | 9 | – | 7 | .563 | 19 | – | 13 | .594 |
| Virginia Tech | 7 | – | 9 | .438 | 15 | – | 14 | .517 |
| Rutgers | 7 | – | 9 | .438 | 20 | – | 13 | .606 |
| West Virginia | 7 | – | 9 | .438 | 17 | – | 14 | .548 |
| Villanova | 6 | – | 10 | .375 | 18 | – | 17 | .514 |
| Georgetown | 4 | – | 12 | .250 | 13 | – | 15 | .464 |
| Miami (FL)* | 4 | – | 12 | .250 | 14 | – | 16 | .467 |
| St. John's*# | 1 | – | 15 | .063 | 2 | – | 21 | .087 |
† 2004 Big East tournament winner As of April 5, 2004; Rankings from AP Poll; *Did not qualify for 2004 Big East tournament. #St. John's had 4 regular-season games vacated due to sanctions against the program; the school′s disputed record was 1–15, 6–21.

The 2003–04 Big East Conference men's basketball season was the 25th in conference history, and involved its 14 full-time member schools.

Pittsburgh was the regular-season champion with a record of 13–3. Connecticut won both the Big East tournament championship and the national championship.

== Season summary & highlights ==
- After three seasons with a divisional structure, the Big East returned to a unitary structure this season.
- Pittsburgh was the regular-season champion with a record of 13–3. It was Pittsburgh's fifth conference championship or co-championship and second outright championship.
- Connecticut won its sixth Big East tournament championship.
- Connecticut won its second national championship. It was the second consecutive national championship for the Big East Conference, Syracuse having won the previous season.
- Connecticut junior guard Ben Gordon was the 2004 NCAA Tournament's top scorer.
- Connecticut junior center Emeka Okafor was the Most Outstanding Player of the 2004 NCAA Tournament.
- After suffering a 20-point loss at Pittsburgh on February 4, 2004, a number of St. John's players broke curfew to visit an adult club and invited a woman they met there back to their Pittsburgh hotel for sex. After they had sex with her, she demanded payment for it from them, and they refused. She then called police and claimed the players had gang-raped her, but police soon charged her with prostitution and filing a false police report. Meanwhile, St. John's University deemed the players' action to be in violation of team rules and "inconsistent with St. John's mission and values," and expelled or suspended six of them, leaving the Red Storm with only four available scholarship players. The scandal rocked the St. John's men's basketball program, and the team stumbled to a 6–21 finish.
- In March 2004, St. John's center Abe Keita claimed that a member of the team's staff had paid him nearly $300 a month for the past four seasons. As a result, on November 26, 2004, St. John's placed itself on two years' probation, withdrew from postseason consideration for the 2004–05 season, and vacated 43 wins in which Keita participated, including the team's 2003 National Invitation Tournament championship. St. John's became the third team in the history of the NIT to be forced to vacate its standing in the tournament.
- The season was the last in the Big East for Miami and Virginia Tech, both of which departed for the Atlantic Coast Conference after the end of the season. Miami had been a member of the Big East for 13 seasons, and Virginia Tech left after four years in the Big East. Miami and Virginia Tech became the first schools ever to leave the Big East.

== Head coaches ==
| School | Coach | Season | Notes |
|---|---|---|---|
| Boston College | Al Skinner | 7th | |
| Connecticut | Jim Calhoun | 18th | |
| Georgetown | Craig Esherick | 6th | Fired March 16, 2004 |
| Miami | Perry Clark | 4th | |
| Notre Dame | Mike Brey | 4th | |
| Pittsburgh | Jamie Dixon | 1st | Big East Coach of the Year |
| Providence | Tim Welsh | 6th | |
| Rutgers | Gary Waters | 3rd | |
| St. John's | Mike Jarvis | 6th | Fired December 19, 2003 |
| St. John's | Kevin Clark | 1st | Interim coach; replaced after season |
| Seton Hall | Louis Orr | 3rd | |
| Syracuse | Jim Boeheim | 28th | |
| Villanova | Jay Wright | 3rd | |
| Virginia Tech | Seth Greenberg | 1st | |
| West Virginia | John Beilein | 2nd | |

== Rankings ==
Connecticut and Pittsburgh were ranked in the Associated Press poll Top 25 all season, with Connecticut reaching No. 1. Connecticut finished the season ranked No. 7 and Pittsburgh finished as No. 9. Boston College, Notre Dame, Providence, and Syracuse also spent time in the Top 25, and all but Notre Dame were ranked at the end of the season.

2003–04 Big East Conference Weekly Rankings Key: ██ Increase in ranking. ██ Decrease in ranking.
| AP Poll | Pre | 11/24 | 12/1 | 12/8 | 12/15 | 12/22 | 12/31 | 1/5 | 1/12 | 1/19 | 1/26 | 2/2 | 2/9 | 2/16 | 2/23 | 3/4 | 3/8 | Final |
|---|---|---|---|---|---|---|---|---|---|---|---|---|---|---|---|---|---|---|
| Boston College | | | | | | | | | | | | | | | | | | 25 |
| Connecticut | 1 | 1 | 3 | 2 | 1 | 1 | 1 | 1 | 1 | 4 | 6 | 5 | 5 | 8 | 8 | 7 | 9 | 7 |
| Georgetown | | | | | | | | | | | | | | | | | | |
| Miami | | | | | | | | | | | | | | | | | | |
| Notre Dame | 21 | 21 | 23 | | | | | | | | | | | | | | | |
| Pittsburgh | 22 | 22 | 22 | 20 | 18 | 16 | 15 | 15 | 13 | 8 | 7 | 4 | 4 | 5 | 3 | 6 | 6 | 9 |
| Providence | | | | | | | | 25 | | | 23 | 23 | 24 | 19 | 13 | 12 | 20 | 21 |
| Rutgers | | | | | | | | | | | | | | | | | | |
| St. John's | | | | | | | | | | | | | | | | | | |
| Seton Hall | | | | | | | | | | | | | | | | | | |
| Syracuse | 7 | 7 | 16 | 19 | 19 | 17 | 17 | 17 | 17 | 13 | 20 | 18 | | | | 24 | 19 | 20 |
| Villanova | | | | | | | | | | | | | | | | | | |
| Virginia Tech | | | | | | | | | | | | | | | | | | |
| West Virginia | | | | | | | | | | | | | | | | | | |

== Regular-season statistical leaders ==
Scoring
| Name | School | PPG |
| Bryant Matthews | VT | 22.1 |
| Hakim Warrick | Syr | 19.8 |
| Chris Thomas | ND | 19.7 |
| Ryan Gomes | Prov | 18.9 |
| Ben Gordon | Conn | 18.5 |

Rebounding
| Name | School | RPG |
| Emeka Okafor | Conn | 11.5 |
| Ryan Gomes | Prov | 9.4 |
| Bryant Matthews | VT | 8.9 |
| Hakim Warrick | Syr | 8.6 |
| Craig Smith | BC | 8.3 |

Assists
| Name | School | APG |
| Taliek Brown | Conn | 6.5 |
| Andre Barrett | SHU | 5.9 |
| Chris Thomas | ND | 4.7 |
| Carl Krauser | Pitt | 4.5 |
| Ben Gordon | Conn | 4.5 |

Steals
| Name | School | SPG |
| Jamon Gordon | VT | 2.8 |
| Bryant Matthews | VT | 2.5 |
| Robert Hite | Mia | 2.0 |
| Andre Stanley | SJU | 2.0 |
| Brandon Bowman | GU | 2.0 |
| Darrel Owens | GU | 2.0 |

Blocks
| Name | School | BPG |
| Emeka Okafor | Conn | 4.1 |
| D'or Fischer | WVU | 4.0 |
| Marcus Douthit | Prov | 3.2 |
| Herve Lamizana | RU | 3.1 |
| Craig Forth | Syr | 2.0 |

Field Goals
| Name | School | FG% |
| Emeka Okafor | Conn | .599 |
| Kelly Whitney | SHU | .562 |
| Craig Smith | BC | .553 |
| Hakim Warrick | Syr | .512 |
| Ryan Gomes | Prov | .507 |

3-Pt Field Goals
| Name | School | 3FG% |
| Ben Gordon | Conn | .433 |
| Gerry McNamara | Syr | .389 |
| Ricky Shields | RU | .373 |
| Chris Thomas | ND | .351 |
No other qualifiers

Free Throws
| Name | School | FT% |
| Gerry McNamara | Syr | .872 |
| Ryan Gomes | Prov | .870 |
| Gerald Riley | GU | .844 |
| Ben Gordon | Conn | .829 |
| Chris Thomas | ND | .826 |

== Postseason ==
=== Big East tournament ===
==== Seeding ====
Teams were seeded in the Big East tournament based on conference record and tiebreakers. The No. 5 through No. 12 seeds played in the first round, and the No. 1 through No. 4 seeds received byes into the quarterfinal round. Teams which finished in 13th place or lower in the conference after the application as necessary of tiebreakers did not qualify for the tournament

Seeding was (1) Pittsburgh, (2) Providence, (3) Connecticut, (4) Syracuse, (5) Boston College, (6) Seton Hall, (7) Notre Dame, (8) Virginia Tech, (9) Rutgers, (10) West Virginia, (11) Villanova, and (12) Georgetown. Miami — which finished the regular season tied for 12th but lost its tiebreaker with Georgetown — and 14th-place St. John's did not qualify for the tournament.

==== Bracket ====
First round Wednesday, March 10
8 | Virginia Tech | 61
9 | Rutgers | 58
5 | Boston College | 68
12 | Georgetown | 57
7 | Notre Dame | 65
10 | West Virginia | 64
6 | Seton Hall | 60
11 | Villanova | 61

Quarterfinals; Thursday, March 11
1 | #6 Pittsburgh | 74
8 | Virginia Tech | 61
4 | Syracuse | 54
5 | Boston College | 57
2 | #9 Connecticut | 66
7 | Notre Dame | 58
3 | #20 Providence | 66
11 | Villanova | 69

Semifinals; Friday, March 12
1 | #6 Pittsburgh | 62
5 | Boston College | 53
2 | #9 Connecticut | 84
11 | Villanova | 67

Final; Saturday, March 13
1 | #6 Pittsburgh | 58
2 | #9 Connecticut | 61

=== NCAA tournament ===
Six Big East teams received bids to the NCAA Tournament. Providence lost in the first round and Boston College and Seton Hall in the second round. Pittsburgh and Syracuse were defeated in the regional semifinals. Connecticut won the national championship. Connecticut junior guard Ben Gordon was the tournament's top scorer with 154 points, and Connecticut junior center Emeka Okafor was the tournament's Most Outstanding Player.

| School | Region | Seed | Round 1 | Round 2 | Sweet 16 | Elite 8 | Final Four | Final |
|---|---|---|---|---|---|---|---|---|
| Connecticut | Phoenix | 2 | 15 Vermont, W 70–53 | 7 DePaul, W 72–55 | 6 Vanderbilt, W 73–53 | 8 Alabama, W 87–71 | AT1 Duke, W 79–78 | SL3 Georgia Tech, W 82–73 |
| Pittsburgh | East Rutherford | 3 | 14 UCF, W 53–44 | 6 Wisconsin, W 59–55 | 2 Oklahoma State, L 63–51 | | | |
| Syracuse | Phoenix | 5 | 12 BYU, W 80–75 | 4 Maryland, W 72–70 | 8 Alabama, L 80–71 | | | |
| Boston College | St. Louis | 6 | 11 Milwaukee, W 58–51 | 3 Georgia Tech, L 57–54 | | | | |
| Seton Hall | Atlanta | 8 | 9 Arizona, W 80–76 | 1 Duke, L 90–62 | | | | |
| Providence | St. Louis | 5 | 12 Pacific, L 66–58 | | | | | |

=== National Invitation Tournament ===
Four Big East teams received bids to the National Invitation Tournament, which did not yet have seeding. They played in two of the tournament's four unnamed brackets. Notre Dame lost in the quarterfinals. Rutgers defeated West Virginia in the second round and Villanova in the quarterfinals and finished as the tournament runner-up, losing to Michigan in the final.

| School | Opening round | Round 1 | Round 2 | Quarterfinals | Semifinals | Final |
|---|---|---|---|---|---|---|
| Rutgers | Bye | Temple, W 76–71 | West Virginia, W 67–64 | Villanova, W 72–60 | Iowa State, W 84–81^{(OT)} | Michigan, L 62–55 |
| Notre Dame | Bye | Purdue, W 71–59 | Saint Louis, W 77–66 | Oregon, L 65–61 | | |
| Villanova | Bye | Drexel, W 85–70 | Virginia, W 73–63 | Rutgers, L 72–60 | | |
| West Virginia | Kent State, W 65–54 | Rhode Island, W 79–72 | Rutgers, L 67–64 | | | |

== Awards and honors ==
=== Big East Conference ===
Player of the Year:

- Emeka Okafor, Connecticut, C, Jr.

Defensive Player of the Year:

- Emeka Okafor, Connecticut, C, Jr.

Rookie of the Year:

- Chris Taft, Pittsburgh, F, Fr.

Most Improved Player:

- Carl Krauser, Pittsburgh, G, So.

Coach of the Year:

- Jamie Dixon, Pittsburgh (1st season)

All-Big East First Team

- Ben Gordon, Connecticut, G, Jr., 6 ft 3 in (191 cm), 200 lb (91 kg), Mount Vernon, N.Y.
- Bryant Matthews, Virginia Tech, F, Sr., 6 ft 7 in (201 cm), 215 lb (98 kg), Columbia, S.C.
- Hakim Warrick, Syracuse, F, Jr., 6 ft 9 in (206 cm), 219 lb (99 kg), Philadelphia, Pa.
- Andre Barrett, Seton Hall, G, Sr., 5 ft 10 in (178 cm), 172 lb (78 kg), The Bronx, N.Y.
- Ryan Gomes, Providence, F, Jr., 6 ft 7 in (201 cm), 250 lb (113 kg), Waterbury, Conn.
- Emeka Okafor, Connecticut, C, Jr., 6 ft 10 in (208 cm), 252 lb (114 kg), Houston, Tex.
- Craig Smith, Boston College, F, So., 6 ft 7 in (201 cm), 250 lb (113 kg), Inglewood, Calif.

All-Big East Second Team:

- Chris Thomas, Notre Dame, G, Jr., 6 ft 1 in (185 cm), 190 lb (86 kg), Indianapolis, Ind.
- Carl Krauser, Pittsburgh, G, So., 6 ft 2 in (188 cm), 200 lb (91 kg), The Bronx, N.Y.
- Jaron Brown, Pittsburgh, G, Sr., 6 ft 4 in (193 cm), 229 lb (104 kg), Lexington, Ky.
- Darius Rice, Miami, F, Sr., 6 ft 10 in (208 cm), 222 lb (101 kg), Jackson, Miss.
- Gerry McNamara, Syracuse, G, So., 6 ft 2 in (188 cm), 182 lb (83 kg), Scranton, Pa.

All-Big East Third Team:

- Chris Taft, Pittsburgh, F, Fr., 6 ft 10 in (208 cm), 260 lb (118 kg), Brooklyn, N.Y.
- Hervé Lamizana, Rutgers, F, Sr., 6 ft 10 in (208 cm), 215 lb (98 kg), Abidjan, Ivory Coast
- Gerald Riley, Georgetown, G, Sr., 6 ft 6 in (198 cm), 217 lb (98 kg), Milledgeville, Ga.
- Allan Ray, Villanova, G, So., 6 ft 2 in (188 cm), 190 lb (86 kg), The Bronx, N.Y.
- Curtis Sumpter, Villanova, F, So., 6 ft 7 in (201 cm), 225 lb (102 kg), Brooklyn, N.Y.

Big East All-Rookie Team:

- Jared Dudley, Boston College, F, Fr., 6 ft 7 in (201 cm), 225 lb (102 kg), San Diego, Calif.
- Charlie Villanueva, Connecticut, F, Fr., 6 ft 11 in (211 cm), 240 lb (109 kg), Brooklyn, N.Y.
- Josh Boone, Connecticut, C, Fr., 6 ft 10 in (208 cm), 237 lb (108 kg), Mount Airy, Md.
- Guillermo Diaz, Miami, G, Fr., 6 ft 2 in (188 cm), 192 lb (87 kg), San Juan, Puerto Rico
- Chris Taft, Pittsburgh, F, Fr., 6 ft 10 in (208 cm), 260 lb (118 kg), Brooklyn, N.Y.
- Quincy Douby, Rutgers, G, Fr., 6 ft 3 in (191 cm), 175 lb (79 kg), Brooklyn, N.Y.
- Mike Nardi, Villanova, G, Fr., 6 ft 2 in (188 cm), 170 lb (77 kg), Linden, N.J.

=== All-Americans ===
The following players were selected to the 2004 Associated Press All-America teams.

Consensus All-America First Team:

- Ryan Gomes, Providence, Key Stats: 18.9 ppg, 9.4 rpg, 2.3 apg, 1.6 spg, 50.7 FG%, 33.3 3P%, 547 points
- Emeka Okafor, Connecticut, Key Stats: 17.6 ppg, 11.5 rpg, 4.1 bpg, 59.9 FG%, 635 points

First Team All-America:

- Ryan Gomes, Providence, Key Stats: 18.9 ppg, 9.4 rpg, 2.3 apg, 1.6 spg, 50.7 FG%, 33.3 3P%, 547 points
- Emeka Okafor, Connecticut, Key Stats: 17.6 ppg, 11.5 rpg, 4.1 bpg, 59.9 FG%, 635 points

Third Team All-America:

- Hakim Warrick, Syracuse, Key Stats: 19.8 ppg, 8.6 rpg, 2.6 apg, 1.1 bpg, 51.2 FG%, 615 points

AP Honorable Mention

- Andre Barrett, Seton Hall
- Ben Gordon, Connecticut
- Carl Krauser, Pittsburgh
- Bryant Matthews, Virginia Tech
- Chris Thomas, Notre Dame

== See also ==
- 2003–04 NCAA Division I men's basketball season
- 2003–04 Boston College Eagles men's basketball team
- 2003–04 Connecticut Huskies men's basketball team
- 2003–04 Georgetown Hoyas men's basketball team
- 2003–04 Notre Dame Fighting Irish men's basketball team
- 2003–04 Pittsburgh Panthers men's basketball team
- 2003–04 Providence Friars men's basketball team
- 2003–04 St. John's Red Storm men's basketball team
- 2003–04 Seton Hall Pirates men's basketball team
- 2003–04 Syracuse Orangemen basketball team
