= 2004 Big East men's basketball tournament =

- Classification: Division I
- Season: 2003–04
- Teams: 12
- Site: Madison Square Garden; New York City
- Champions: Connecticut (6th title)
- Winning coach: Jim Calhoun (6th title)
- MVP: Ben Gordon (Connecticut)
- Top scorer: Ben Gordon (Connecticut) (81 points)

2003–04 Big East men's basketball standings
	Conf.				Overall
Team	W		L	PCT	W		L	PCT
No. 9 Pittsburgh	13	–	3	.813	31	–	5	.861
No. 7 Connecticut †	12	–	4	.750	33	–	6	.846
No. 21 Providence	11	–	5	.688	20	–	9	.690
No. 20 Syracuse	11	–	5	.688	23	–	8	.742
No. 25 Boston College	10	–	6	.625	24	–	10	.706
Seton Hall	10	–	6	.625	21	–	12	.636
Notre Dame	9	–	7	.563	19	–	13	.594
Virginia Tech	7	–	9	.438	15	–	14	.517
Rutgers	7	–	9	.438	20	–	13	.606
West Virginia	7	–	9	.438	17	–	14	.548
Villanova	6	–	10	.375	18	–	17	.514
Georgetown	4	–	12	.250	13	–	15	.464
Miami (FL)*	4	–	12	.250	14	–	16	.467
St. John's*#	1	–	15	.063	2	–	21	.087
† 2004 Big East tournament winner As of April 5, 2004; Rankings from AP Poll; *Did not qualify for 2004 Big East tournament. #St. John's had 4 regular-season games vacated due to sanctions against the program; the school′s disputed record was 1–15, 6–21.

The 2004 Big East men's basketball tournament, a part of the 2003–04 NCAA Division I men's basketball season, took place from March 10–13, 2004 at Madison Square Garden in New York City. It was a single-elimination tournament with four rounds and the four highest seeds (two from each Big East division) received byes in the first round. The twelve Big East teams with the best conference records were invited to participate. The winner, Connecticut, received the Big East Conference's automatic bid to the 2004 NCAA tournament, the sixth for the Huskies, tying Georgetown for the most Big East tournament championships.

== Bracket ==
First round Wednesday, March 10
8	Virginia Tech	61
9	Rutgers	58
5	Boston College	68
12	Georgetown	57
7	Notre Dame	65
10	West Virginia	64
6	Seton Hall	60
11	Villanova	61

Quarterfinals; Thursday, March 11
1	#6 Pittsburgh	74
8	Virginia Tech	61
4	Syracuse	54
5	Boston College	57
2	#9 Connecticut	66
7	Notre Dame	58
3	#20 Providence	66
11	Villanova	69

Semifinals; Friday, March 12
1	#6 Pittsburgh	62
5	Boston College	53
2	#9 Connecticut	84
11	Villanova	67

Final; Saturday, March 13
1	#6 Pittsburgh	58
2	#9 Connecticut	61

Note: By finishing below twelfth place during the regular season, Miami (FL) and St. John's did not qualify for the tournament.

== Games ==
=== 1st round: Wednesday, March 10 ===
Noon

Team	1	2	Total
(9) Rutgers	35	23	58
(8) Virginia Tech	27	34	61

2PM

Team	1	2	Total
(12) Georgetown	22	35	57
(5) Boston College	27	41	68

7PM

Team	1	2	Total
(10) West Virginia	24	40	64
(7) Notre Dame	35	30	65

9PM

Team	1	2	Total
(11) Villanova	34	27	61
(6) Seton Hall	32	28	60

=== Quarterfinals: Thursday, March 11 ===
Noon

Team	1	2	Total
(8) Virginia Tech	24	37	61
(1) Pittsburgh	34	40	74

2 PM

Team	1	2	Total
(5) Boston College	23	34	57
(4) Syracuse	32	22	54

7 PM

Team	1	2	Total
(7) Notre Dame	28	30	58
(2) Connecticut	37	29	66

9 PM

Team	1	2	Total
(11) Villanova	32	37	69
(3) Providence	33	33	66

=== Semifinals: Friday, March 12 ===
7 PM

Team	1	2	Total
(5) Boston College	26	27	53
(1) Pittsburgh	22	40	62

9 PM

Team	1	2	Total
(11) Villanova	24	43	67
(2) Connecticut	37	47	84

=== Championship game ===
ESPN

Saturday, March 13
9:00 pm

Box Score

#2 Connecticut Huskies 61, #1 Pittsburgh Panthers 58
Pts: B. Gordon 23; Rebs: E. Okafor 13; Asts: T. Brown 6	Pts: M. McCarroll, C. Taft 11; Rebs: C. Krauser 8 Asts: J. Brown 6 Halftime Score: Pittsburgh, 34-25

Madison Square Garden - New York, NY
Attendance: 19,528
Referees: Jim Burr, Mike Kitts, Bob Donato

== Awards ==
Dave Gavitt Trophy (Most Outstanding Player): Ben Gordon, Connecticut

All-Tournament Team

- Jaron Brown, Pittsburgh
- Taliek Brown, Connecticut
- Carl Krauser, Pittsburgh
- Craig Smith, Boston College
- Chris Taft, Pittsburgh
