= 2003–04 Boston College Eagles men's basketball team =

American college basketball season

2003–04 Boston College Eagles men's basketball

NCAA tournament, Round of 32
- Conference: Big East Conference

Ranking
- AP: No. 25 т
- Record: 24–10 (10–6 Big East)
- Head coach: Al Skinner (7th season)
- Home arena: Silvio O. Conte Forum

2003–04 Big East men's basketball standings
	Conf.				Overall
Team	W		L	PCT	W		L	PCT
No. 9 Pittsburgh	13	–	3	.813	31	–	5	.861
No. 7 Connecticut †	12	–	4	.750	33	–	6	.846
No. 21 Providence	11	–	5	.688	20	–	9	.690
No. 20 Syracuse	11	–	5	.688	23	–	8	.742
No. 25 Boston College	10	–	6	.625	24	–	10	.706
Seton Hall	10	–	6	.625	21	–	12	.636
Notre Dame	9	–	7	.563	19	–	13	.594
Virginia Tech	7	–	9	.438	15	–	14	.517
Rutgers	7	–	9	.438	20	–	13	.606
West Virginia	7	–	9	.438	17	–	14	.548
Villanova	6	–	10	.375	18	–	17	.514
Georgetown	4	–	12	.250	13	–	15	.464
Miami (FL)*	4	–	12	.250	14	–	16	.467
St. John's*#	1	–	15	.063	2	–	21	.087
† 2004 Big East tournament winner As of April 5, 2004; Rankings from AP Poll; *Did not qualify for 2004 Big East tournament. #St. John's had 4 regular-season games vacated due to sanctions against the program; the school′s disputed record was 1–15, 6–21.

The 2003–04 Boston College Eagles men's basketball team represented Boston College as a member of the Big East Conference during the 2003–04 NCAA Division I men's basketball season. Led by head coach Al Skinner, they played their home games at Conte Forum in Chestnut Hill, Massachusetts. The team finished 5th in the Big East regular season standings, reached the semifinals of the Big East tournament, and received an at-large bid to the NCAA tournament. Playing as the No. 6 seed in the St. Louis region, the Eagles defeated Utah in the opening round before losing 57–54 to eventual National runner-up Georgia Tech in the second round. Boston College finished the season with a 24–10 (10–6 Big East) record and a No. 25 ranking in the AP poll.

== Roster ==
2003–04 Boston College Eagles men's basketball team
Players
Coaches

Pos.	#	Name	Height	Weight	Year	Previous school	Hometown
F	0	Uka Agbai	6 ft 8 in (2.03 m)	262 lb (119 kg)	Sr	Queens Village, New York
F	1	Craig Smith	6 ft 7 in (2.01 m)	250 lb (113 kg)	So	Fairfax HS	Inglewood, California
F	2	Johnnie Jackson	6 ft 6 in (1.98 m)	210 lb (95 kg)	So	Memphis, Tennessee
F	3	Jared Dudley	6 ft 7 in (2.01 m)	225 lb (102 kg)	Fr	Horizon HS	San Diego, California
G	4	Jermaine Watson	6 ft 3 in (1.91 m)	205 lb (93 kg)	Jr	Tabor Academy	Dorchester, Massachusetts
G	11	Louis Hinnant	6 ft 4 in (1.93 m)	200 lb (91 kg)	So	Gwynn Park HS	Oxon Hill, Maryland
G	12	Steve Hailey	6 ft 0 in (1.83 m)	170 lb (77 kg)	Fr	Worcester Academy	Boston, Massachusetts
C	13	Nate Doornekamp	7 ft 0 in (2.13 m)	260 lb (118 kg)	Jr	Ernestown Secondary School	Odessa, Ontario, Canada
G	21	Tyler Neville	6 ft 3 in (1.91 m)	200 lb (91 kg)	So	Ridgewood HS	Ridgewood, New Jersey
G	23	Sean Marshall	6 ft 5 in (1.96 m)	212 lb (96 kg)	Fr	Eisenhower HS	Rialto, California
G	25	Ted Dunlap	6 ft 3 in (1.91 m)	195 lb (88 kg)	So	Jesuit College Preparatory School of Dallas	Dallas, Texas
G	51	Tavio Hobson	6 ft 0 in (1.83 m)	185 lb (84 kg)	So	Seattle, Washington
G		Devon Evertsen	6 ft 6 in (1.98 m)	205 lb (93 kg)	Fr	Moon Valley HS	Phoenix, Arizona

Head coach

- Al Skinner

Assistant coach(es)

Legend

- (C) Team captain
- (S) Suspended
- (I) Ineligible
- (W) Walk-on
- Injured
- Current redshirt

Roster

== Schedule and results ==
Date time, TV	Rank^{#}	Opponent^{#}	Result	Record	Site city, state
Exhibition
Nov 10, 2003*; 7:00 p.m.		Inland's Finest	W 101–64		Silvio O. Conte Forum; Chestnut Hill, Massachusetts
Nov 16, 2003*; 2:00 p.m.		HP-Minnesota Panthers	W 82–64		Silvio O. Conte Forum; Chestnut Hill, Massachusetts
Regular season
Nov 22, 2003*; 5:30 p.m.		vs. Appalachian State; Paradise Jam	W 92–67	1–0	Sports and Fitness Center; Charlotte Amalie, U.S. Virgin Islands
Nov 23, 2003*; 5:30 p.m.		vs. Monmouth; Paradise Jam	W 60–50	2–0	Sports and Fitness Center; Charlotte Amalie, U.S. Virgin Islands
Nov 24, 2003*; 8:00 p.m.		vs. Wichita State; Paradise Jam	W 84–81	3–0	Sports and Fitness Center; Charlotte Amalie, U.S. Virgin Islands
Nov 29, 2003*; 1:30 p.m.		Boston University	W 67–44	4–0	Silvio O. Conte Forum; Chestnut Hill, Massachusetts
Dec 2, 2003*; 7:30 p.m.		Holy Cross	W 64–51	5–0	Silvio O. Conte Forum; Chestnut Hill, Massachusetts
Dec 6, 2003*; 2:00 p.m.		UMass	W 76–75 ^{OT}	6–0	Silvio O. Conte Forum; Chestnut Hill, Massachusetts
Dec 9, 2003*; 4:00 p.m.		at No. 12 Saint Joseph's	L 57–67	6–1	Hagan Arena; Philadelphia, Pennsylvania
Dec 14, 2003*; 2:00 p.m.		Sacred Heart	W 72–70	7–1	Silvio O. Conte Forum; Chestnut Hill, Massachusetts
Dec 20, 2003*; 2:00 p.m.		Kent State	W 58–54 ^{OT}	8–1	Silvio O. Conte Forum; Chestnut Hill, Massachusetts
Dec 23, 2003*; 3:00 p.m.		Stony Brook	W 82–64	9–1	Silvio O. Conte Forum; Chestnut Hill, Massachusetts
Dec 30, 2003*; 7:00 p.m.		at Clemson	L 62–72	9–2	Littlejohn Coliseum; Clemson, South Carolina
Jan 3, 2004*; 2:00 p.m.		St. Bonaventure	W 77–70	10–2	Silvio O. Conte Forum; Chestnut Hill, Massachusetts
Jan 6, 2004; 7:30 p.m.		at Georgetown	W 72–64	11–2 (1–0)	Verizon Center (7,735); Washington, D.C.
Jan 10, 2004; 2:00 p.m.		at Syracuse	L 73–96	11–3 (1–1)	Carrier Dome; Syracuse, New York
Jan 14, 2004; 7:30 p.m.		Villanova	L 89–92	11–4 (1–2)	Silvio O. Conte Forum; Chestnut Hill, Massachusetts
Jan 17, 2004; 2:00 p.m.		Seton Hall	W 72–63	12–4 (2–2)	Silvio O. Conte Forum; Chestnut Hill, Massachusetts
Jan 20, 2004*; 6:00 p.m.		NC State	W 66–65 ^{OT}	13–4	Silvio O. Conte Forum; Chestnut Hill, Massachusetts
Jan 24, 2004; 4:00 p.m.		at West Virginia	L 62–65	13–5 (2–3)	WVU Coliseum; Morgantown, West Virginia
Jan 28, 2004; 7:00 p.m.		at Pittsburgh	L 56–68	13–6 (2–4)	Petersen Events Center; Pittsburgh, Pennsylvania
Jan 31, 2004; 4:00 p.m., Fox 61		No. 8 Connecticut	L 58–63	13–7 (2–5)	Silvio O. Conte Forum (8,606); Chestnut Hill, Massachusetts
Feb 4, 2004; 7:30 p.m.		Notre Dame	W 76–69	14–7 (3–5)	Silvio O. Conte Forum; Chestnut Hill, Massachusetts
Feb 8, 2004; 12:00 p.m., WWOR		at St. John's	W 89–61	15–7 (4–5)	Madison Square Garden (7,453); New York, New York
Feb 11, 2004; 7:30 p.m.		at Miami (FL)	W 74–72 ^{OT}	16–7 (5–5)	Convocation Center; Coral Gables, Florida
Feb 14, 2004; 2:00 p.m., Cox Sports		No. 24 Providence	L 52–61	16–8 (5–6)	Silvio O. Conte Forum (7,682); Chestnut Hill, Massachusetts
Feb 16, 2004; 8:00 p.m.		at Seton Hall	W 67–63	17–8 (6–6)	Continental Airlines Arena; East Rutherford, New Jersey
Feb 22, 2004; 12:00 p.m.		Rutgers	W 76–44	18–8 (7–6)	Silvio O. Conte Forum; Chestnut Hill, Massachusetts
Feb 25, 2004; 7:30 p.m.		Virginia Tech	W 56–48	19–8 (8–6)	Silvio O. Conte Forum; Chestnut Hill, Massachusetts
Mar 3, 2004; 7:30 p.m., Metro		St. John's	W 68–54	20–8 (9–6)	Silvio O. Conte Forum (5,406); Chestnut Hill, Massachusetts
Mar 6, 2004; 12:00 p.m., Cox Sports		at No. 12 Providence	W 63–54	21–8 (10–6)	Dunkin' Donuts Center (12,993); Providence, Rhode Island
Big East tournament
Mar 10, 2004*; 2:00 p.m.	(5)	vs. (12) Georgetown; First Round	W 68–57	22–8	Madison Square Garden (19,173); New York, New York
Mar 11, 2004*; 2:00 p.m.	(5)	vs. (4) No. 19 Syracuse; Quarterfinals	W 57–54	23–8	Madison Square Garden; New York, New York
Mar 12, 2004*; 7:00 p.m.	(5)	vs. (1) No. 6 Pittsburgh; Semifinals	L 53–62	23–9	Madison Square Garden; New York, New York
NCAA Tournament
Mar 19, 2004*; 12:30 p.m.	(6 STL) No. 25	vs. (11 STL) Utah; First Round	W 58–51	24–9	Bradley Center; Milwaukee, Wisconsin
Mar 21, 2004*; 2:15 p.m.	(6 STL) No. 25	vs. (3 STL) No. 14 Georgia Tech; First Round	L 54–57	24–10	Bradley Center; Milwaukee, Wisconsin
*Non-conference game. ^{#}Rankings from AP poll. (#) Tournament seedings in parentheses. STL=St. Louis. All times are in Eastern Time.
