= 2003–04 Pittsburgh Panthers men's basketball team =

American college basketball season

2003–04 Pittsburgh Panthers men's basketball

Big East Regular Season Champions

NCAA tournament, Sweet Sixteen
- Conference: Big East Conference (1979–2013)

Ranking
- Coaches: No. 7
- AP: No. 9
- Record: 31–5 (13–3 Big East)
- Head coach: Jamie Dixon (1st season)
- Assistant coaches: Barry Rohrssen (3rd season); Joe Lombardi (1st season); Pat Sandle (3rd season)
- Home arena: Petersen Events Center (Capacity: 12,508)

2003–04 Big East men's basketball standings
	Conf.				Overall
Team	W		L	PCT	W		L	PCT
No. 9 Pittsburgh	13	–	3	.813	31	–	5	.861
No. 7 Connecticut †	12	–	4	.750	33	–	6	.846
No. 21 Providence	11	–	5	.688	20	–	9	.690
No. 20 Syracuse	11	–	5	.688	23	–	8	.742
No. 25 Boston College	10	–	6	.625	24	–	10	.706
Seton Hall	10	–	6	.625	21	–	12	.636
Notre Dame	9	–	7	.563	19	–	13	.594
Virginia Tech	7	–	9	.438	15	–	14	.517
Rutgers	7	–	9	.438	20	–	13	.606
West Virginia	7	–	9	.438	17	–	14	.548
Villanova	6	–	10	.375	18	–	17	.514
Georgetown	4	–	12	.250	13	–	15	.464
Miami (FL)*	4	–	12	.250	14	–	16	.467
St. John's*#	1	–	15	.063	2	–	21	.087
† 2004 Big East tournament winner As of April 5, 2004; Rankings from AP Poll; *Did not qualify for 2004 Big East tournament. #St. John's had 4 regular-season games vacated due to sanctions against the program; the school′s disputed record was 1–15, 6–21.

The 2003–04 Pittsburgh Panthers men's basketball team represented the University of Pittsburgh in the 2003–04 NCAA Division I men's basketball season. Led by first year head coach Jamie Dixon, the Panthers finished with a record of 31–5 and made it to the Sweet 16 of the 2004 NCAA Division I men's basketball tournament where they lost to Oklahoma State.

== Roster ==
2003–04 Pittsburgh Panthers men's basketball team
Players
Coaches

Pos.	#	Name	Height	Weight	Year	Hometown
G	1	Julius Page	6 ft 3 in (1.91 m)	191 lb (87 kg)	Sr	Buffalo, New York
F	2	Chevon Troutman	6 ft 7 in (2.01 m)	240 lb (109 kg)	Jr	Williamsport, Pennsylvania
G	3	Yuri Demetris	6 ft 4 in (1.93 m)	220 lb (100 kg)	Jr	Glenshaw, Pennsylvania
G	4	Jaron Brown	6 ft 4 in (1.93 m)	229 lb (104 kg)	Sr	Lexington, Kentucky
G	11	Carl Krauser	6 ft 2 in (1.88 m)	200 lb (91 kg)	So	Bronx, New York
G	12	Ed Turner	6 ft 7 in (2.01 m)	180 lb (82 kg)	Fr	Buffalo, New York
F	14	Levon Kendall	6 ft 10 in (2.08 m)	225 lb (102 kg)	Fr	Vancouver, Canada
G	15	Charles Small	5 ft 7 in (1.7 m)	175 lb (79 kg)	Fr	Detroit, Michigan
F	21	Mark McCarroll	6 ft 11 in (2.11 m)	220 lb (100 kg)	Jr	Queens, New York
G	22	Antonio Graves	6 ft 3 in (1.91 m)	190 lb (86 kg)	Fr	Mansfield, Ohio
F	23	Chris Taft	6 ft 10 in (2.08 m)	260 lb (118 kg)	Fr	Brooklyn, New York
G	24	Marcus Bowman	6 ft 3 in (1.91 m)	185 lb (84 kg)	Fr	Columbia, South Carolina
C	33	Aaron Gray	7 ft 0 in (2.13 m)	270 lb (122 kg)	Fr	Emmaus, Pennsylvania
C	55	Toree Morris	6 ft 10 in (2.08 m)	282 lb (128 kg)	Sr	Oliver Springs, Tennessee

Head coach

Jamie Dixon

Assistant coach(es)

- Barry Rohrssen
- Joe Lombardi
- Pat Sandle

Legend

- (C) Team captain
- (S) Suspended
- (I) Ineligible
- (W) Walk-on
- Injured
- Current redshirt

== Bibliography ==
- Pitt 2017–18 Basketball Media Guide, 2017, pages 77, 99–100.
