= 2003–04 Providence Friars men's basketball team =

American college basketball season

2003–04 Providence Friars men's basketball
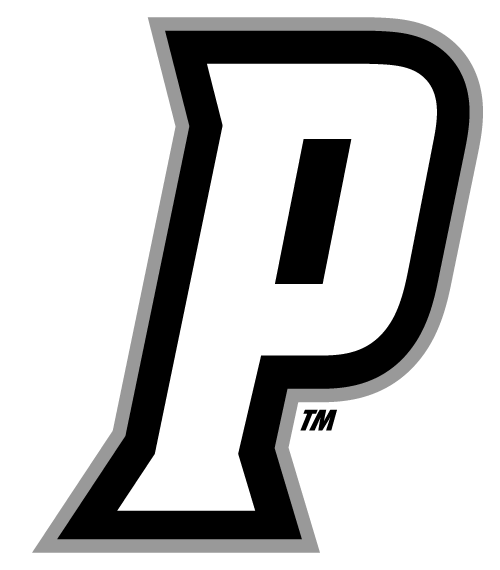

NCAA, #5, Midwest Region, First Round
- Conference: Big East Conference

Ranking
- AP: No. 21
- Record: 20–9 (11–5 Big East)
- Head coach: Tim Welsh (6th season)
- Assistant coaches: Steve DeMeo; Phil Seymore; Bob Walsh
- MVP: Ryan Gomes
- Captain: Ryan Gomes
- Home arena: Dunkin' Donuts Center

2003–04 Big East men's basketball standings
	Conf.				Overall
Team	W		L	PCT	W		L	PCT
No. 9 Pittsburgh	13	–	3	.813	31	–	5	.861
No. 7 Connecticut †	12	–	4	.750	33	–	6	.846
No. 21 Providence	11	–	5	.688	20	–	9	.690
No. 20 Syracuse	11	–	5	.688	23	–	8	.742
No. 25 Boston College	10	–	6	.625	24	–	10	.706
Seton Hall	10	–	6	.625	21	–	12	.636
Notre Dame	9	–	7	.563	19	–	13	.594
Virginia Tech	7	–	9	.438	15	–	14	.517
Rutgers	7	–	9	.438	20	–	13	.606
West Virginia	7	–	9	.438	17	–	14	.548
Villanova	6	–	10	.375	18	–	17	.514
Georgetown	4	–	12	.250	13	–	15	.464
Miami (FL)*	4	–	12	.250	14	–	16	.467
St. John's*#	1	–	15	.063	2	–	21	.087
† 2004 Big East tournament winner As of April 5, 2004; Rankings from AP Poll; *Did not qualify for 2004 Big East tournament. #St. John's had 4 regular-season games vacated due to sanctions against the program; the school′s disputed record was 1–15, 6–21.

The 2003–04 Providence Friars men's basketball team represented Providence College in the Big East Conference. The team finished with an 11–5 conference record and a 20–9 record overall.

Coming off an 18–14 record and a second-round NIT loss in 2002–03, the team returned all five starters for coach Tim Welsh's sixth season with the Friars. However, forward Romuald Augustin transferred to Bryant College for his fifth year of eligibility, while walk-on guard Chris Burns also transferred to Bryant for his sophomore season. The team also lost two departing seniors, guard Kareem Hayletts and forward Stephen Traugott. On February 24, after playing in 12 games for the Friars, senior forward Māris Ļaksa left the team to play professional basketball in Slovenia.

The Friars began the season receiving votes in both polls, but not ranked in either. Following an 8–1 start that included a win over #14 Illinois, the Friars earned a #25 ranking in the AP Poll in time for their January 5 matchup with #18 Texas. The Friars took the Longhorns to overtime, but as time expired in the overtime period, Texas forward P. J. Tucker released a layup to give the Longhorns a two-point win. The controversial shot was reviewed for more than five minutes by the officials, who determined that the clock read "00.0" but the red backboard light had not yet gone on when the ball was released, which at the time overruled the clock.

Despite the close loss, the Friars re-emerged in the top 25 three weeks later, following a road win over #4 Connecticut. A six-game winning streak that began with a win over #18 Syracuse propelled the Friars to a #12 ranking in the AP Poll on March 1. This was followed by two home losses to close out the regular season, and a #3 seed in the 2004 Big East men's basketball tournament. Following a first-round bye, the Friars dropped a three-point game to Villanova in the quarterfinals, leading to a #5 seed in the NCAA tournament. In the first round, the Friars were defeated 66–58 by the #12 seed, Pacific. The Friars ended the season with a #21 ranking in the AP Poll.

The Friars were led in scoring (18.9 ppg) and rebounding (9.4 rpg) by junior forward Ryan Gomes. He became the fourth Friar to be named a First Team All-American by the Associated Press.

== Roster ==
2003–04 Providence Friars men's basketball team
Players
Coaches

Pos.	#	Name	Height	Weight	Year	Previous school	Hometown
G	1	Donnie McGrath	6 ft 4 in (1.93 m)	190 lb (86 kg)	So	John F. Kennedy Catholic High School	Katonah, New York
F/C	3	Ryan Gomes (C)	6 ft 7 in (2.01 m)	245 lb (111 kg)	Jr	Wilby High School	Waterbury, Connecticut
C	4	Marcus Douthit	6 ft 10 in (2.08 m)	235 lb (107 kg)	Sr	Notre Dame Prep	Syracuse, New York
G	5	Gerald Brown	6 ft 4 in (1.93 m)	190 lb (86 kg)	Fr	Hargrave Military Academy	Baltimore, Maryland
F	10	Sean Van De Walle (W)	6 ft 4 in (1.93 m)	205 lb (93 kg)	Fr	Fenwick High School	Elmhurst, Illinois
G	11	Abdul Mills (redshirt)	6 ft 4 in (1.93 m)	195 lb (88 kg)	RS Sr	Milford Academy	Brooklyn, New York
G	13	Sheiku Kabba	6 ft 3 in (1.91 m)	200 lb (91 kg)	Sr	Bronx Regional High School	Bronx, New York
F	15	Herbert Hill	6 ft 9 in (2.06 m)	220 lb (100 kg)	RS Fr	Kinston High School	Kinston, North Carolina
F	20	Chris Anrin	6 ft 7 in (2.01 m)	220 lb (100 kg)	Sr	08 Stockholm Human Rights	Värmdö Municipality, Sweden
F	21	Jeff Parmer (redshirt)	6 ft 7 in (2.01 m)	230 lb (104 kg)	Fr	Niagara Falls High School	Niagara Falls, New York
F	22	Māris Ļaksa	6 ft 9 in (2.06 m)	230 lb (104 kg)	Sr	Latvian Junior National Team	Ventspils, Latvia
G	24	Dwight Brewington	6 ft 5 in (1.96 m)	195 lb (88 kg)	Fr	Worcester Academy	Lynn, Massachusetts
F	25	Tuukka Kotti	6 ft 9 in (2.06 m)	220 lb (100 kg)	Jr	Salon Vilpas Salo	Forssa, Finland
G	31	Timothy Englert (W)	5 ft 11 in (1.8 m)	165 lb (75 kg)	So	Bergen Catholic High School	Ramsey, New Jersey
F	35	Rob Sanders	6 ft 6 in (1.98 m)	215 lb (98 kg)	Jr	St. Thomas More School	New London, Connecticut

Head coach

Tim Welsh

Assistant coach(es)

Steve DeMeo
Phil Seymore
Bob Walsh

Legend

- (C) Team captain
- (S) Suspended
- (I) Ineligible
- (W) Walk-on
- Injured
- Current redshirt

Roster
Last update: 2010-02-07

=== Depth chart ===
Pos.	Starting 5	Bench 1	Bench 2
C	Marcus Douthit	(Māris Ļaksa)	Herbert Hill
PF	Ryan Gomes	Tuukka Kotti	Jeff Parmer (redshirt)
SF	Rob Sanders	Chris Anrin	Sean Van De Walle (W)
SG	Sheiku Kabba	Gerald Brown	Abdul Mills (redshirt)
PG	Donnie McGrath	Dwight Brewington	Timothy Englert (W)

=== Incoming recruits ===
College recruiting information
Name	Hometown	School	Height	Weight	Commit date
Dwight Brewington; PG	Lynn, Massachusetts	Worcester Academy	6 ft 5 in (1.96 m)	187 lb (85 kg)	Jul 8, 2003
Dwight Brewington; PG	Recruit ratings: Scout: Rivals:				
Gerald Brown; SG	Baltimore	Hargrave Military Academy	6 ft 4 in (1.93 m)	180 lb (82 kg)	Jul 8, 2003
Gerald Brown; SG	Recruit ratings: Scout: Rivals:				
Jeff Parmer; PF	Niagara Falls, New York	Niagara Falls HS	6 ft 7 in (2.01 m)	215 lb (98 kg)	Jul 8, 2003
Jeff Parmer; PF	Recruit ratings: Scout: Rivals:				
Overall recruit ranking:
Note: In many cases, Scout, Rivals, 247Sports, On3, and ESPN may conflict in their listings of height and weight.; In these cases, the average was taken. ESPN grades are on a 100-point scale.; Sources: "2003 Providence Signees". Rivals.; "2003 Providence Signees". Scout.; "Scout.com Team Recruiting Rankings". Scout.; "2003 Team Ranking". Rivals.

== Schedule ==
Date time, TV	Rank^{#}	Opponent^{#}	Result	Record	Site (attendance) city, state
Exhibition games
November 2*; 3:00 pm		Global Sports All-Stars	W 77–63		Dunkin' Donuts Center (5,260); Providence, Rhode Island
November 15*; 7:30 pm		USDBL/320 All-Stars	L 109–112 ^{OT}		Dunkin' Donuts Center (5,173); Providence, Rhode Island
Non-conference games
November 22*; 7:30 pm		Hofstra	W 69–56	1–0	Dunkin' Donuts Center (8,163); Providence, Rhode Island
November 29*; 7:30 pm, Cox Sports		Alabama	W 76–71	2–0	Dunkin' Donuts Center (9,256); Providence, Rhode Island
December 2*; 7:30 pm, Cox Sports		South Florida	W 84–60	3–0	Dunkin' Donuts Center (7,554); Providence, Rhode Island
December 6*; 4:00 pm, Cox Sports		at Rhode Island	L 79–89	3–1	Ryan Center (7,657); Kingston, Rhode Island
December 9*; 7:00 pm, ESPN		vs. No. 14 Illinois; Jimmy V Classic	W 70–51	4–1	Madison Square Garden (7,665); New York City
December 21*; 3:00 pm, Cox Sports		Central Connecticut	W 72–67	5–1	Dunkin' Donuts Center (7,543); Providence, Rhode Island
December 23*; 7:30 pm		at Richmond	W 57–56	6–1	Robins Center (6,043); Richmond, Virginia
December 28*; 12:00 pm, Cox Sports		Siena	W 73–66	7–1	Dunkin' Donuts Center (7,434); Providence, Rhode Island
January 3*; 3:00 pm, CSN		at Virginia	W 84–69	8–1	University Hall (7,470); Charlottesville, Virginia
January 5*; 7:00 pm, ESPN	No. 25	No. 18 Texas	L 77–79 ^{OT}	8–2	Dunkin' Donuts Center (12,993); Providence, Rhode Island
Big East regular season
January 10; 7:00 pm, NESN	No. 25	at Rutgers	L 64–65	8–3 (0–1)	Louis Brown Athletic Center (6,942); Piscataway, New Jersey
January 12; 8:00 pm, Cox Sports		at Seton Hall	W 63–60	9–3 (1–1)	Continental Airlines Arena (7,737); East Rutherford, New Jersey
January 17; 7:30 pm, Cox Sports		West Virginia	W 87–66	10–3 (2–1)	Dunkin' Donuts Center (10,033); Providence, Rhode Island
January 19*; 8:00 pm		Loyola Chicago	W 89–59	11–3 (2–1)	Dunkin' Donuts Center (6,943); Providence, Rhode Island
January 21; 7:30 pm		Villanova	W 62–56	12–3 (3–1)	Dunkin' Donuts Center (8,972); Providence, Rhode Island
January 24; 12:00 pm, Cox Sports		at No. 4 Connecticut	W 66–56	13–3 (4–1)	Hartford Civic Center (16,294); Hartford, Connecticut
January 26; 7:30 pm, Cox Sports	No. 23	Georgetown	W 66–50	14–3 (5–1)	Dunkin' Donuts Center (10,397); Providence, Rhode Island
February 1; 12:00 pm, Cox Sports	No. 23	Seton Hall	L 46–55	14–4 (5–2)	Dunkin' Donuts Center (10,191); Providence, Rhode Island
February 4; 7:00 pm	No. 23	at Virginia Tech	L 57–69	14–5 (5–3)	Cassell Coliseum (6,323); Blacksburg, Virginia
February 7; 12:00 pm, Cox Sports	No. 23	No. 18 Syracuse	W 74–61	15–5 (6–3)	Dunkin' Donuts Center (12,993); Providence, Rhode Island
February 11; 7:00 pm	No. 24	at Villanova	W 100–74	16–5 (7–3)	The Pavilion (6,500); Villanova, Pennsylvania
February 14; 2:00 pm, Cox Sports	No. 24	at Boston College	W 61–52	17–5 (8–3)	Conte Forum (7,682); Chestnut Hill, Massachusetts
February 21; 2:00 pm, NESN	No. 19	Miami	W 70–57	18–5 (9–3)	Dunkin' Donuts Center (12,993); Providence, Rhode Island
February 24; 7:30 pm, Cox Sports	No. 13	at Notre Dame	W 73–59	19–5 (10–3)	Edmund P. Joyce Center (11,418); Notre Dame, Indiana
February 29; 12:00 pm, NESN	No. 13	at St. John's	W 103–78	20–5 (11–3)	Madison Square Garden (N/A); New York
March 2; 7:30 pm, Cox Sports	No. 12	No. 6 Pittsburgh	L 61–88	20–6 (11–4)	Dunkin' Donuts Center (12,993); Providence, Rhode Island
March 6; 12:00 pm, Cox Sports	No. 12	Boston College	L 54–63	20–7 (11–5)	Dunkin' Donuts Center (12,993); Providence, Rhode Island
Big East tournament
March 11; 9:30 pm, ESPN	No. 20	vs. Villanova; Quarterfinals	L 66–69	20–8 (11–5)	Madison Square Garden (19,528); New York
NCAA tournament
March 19*; 6:25 pm, CBS	No. 5-M	vs. No. 12-M Pacific; First Round	L 58–66	20–9 (11–5)	Kemper Arena (17,500); Kansas City, Missouri
*Non-conference game. ^{#}Rankings from AP Poll. †NCAA Tournament ranks are seeds in the region (E=East, M=Midwest, S=South, W=West). (#) Tournament seedings in parentheses. All times are in Eastern Time.

== Rankings ==
Ranking movement Legend: ██ Improvement in ranking. ██ Decrease in ranking.
Poll	Pre	Wk 1	Wk 2	Wk 3	Wk 4	Wk 5	Wk 6	Wk 7	Wk 8	Wk 9	Wk 10	Wk 11	Wk 12	Wk 13	Wk 14	Wk 15	Wk 16	WK 17	Final
AP	RV	RV	RV		RV	RV	RV	25	RV	RV	23	23	24	19	13	12	20	21	n/a
Coaches	RV	RV	RV		RV	RV	RV	RV			24	23	21	17	13	13	17	19	RV

== Awards and honors ==
Recipient	Award(s)
Chris Anrin	2004 John Zannini Coaches' Award; 2004 Thomas Ramos Academic Award
Dwight Brewington	2004 Promising Prospect Award
Marcus Douthit	2004 Marvin Barnes Defensive Player of the Year Award
Ryan Gomes	2004 Associated Press First Team All-American; 2004 USBWA First Team All-American; 2004 NABC Second Team All-American; 2004 All-Big East First Team; 2004 USBWA All-District 1 First Team; 2004 NABC Division I All-District 1 First Team; 2004 Naismith College Player of the Year Finalist; 2004 Jimmy Walker Most Valuable Player Award; March 1: Big East Co-Player of the Week; January 26: Big East Player of the Week; January 5: Big East Co-Player of the Week; December 15: Big East Co-Player of the Week; 2004 John R. Wooden Award Midseason Top 30 Candidate; 2004 Preseason All-Big East First Team; 2004 John R. Wooden Award Preseason Top 50 Candidate
Sheiku Kabba	2004 Co-Unsung Hero Award
Tuukka Kotti	2004 Co-Unsung Hero Award
Donnie McGrath	2004 Coca-Cola Most Improved Player Award
