= 2003–04 St. John's Red Storm men's basketball team =

American college basketball season

2003–04 St. John's Red Storm men's basketball
- Conference: Big East Conference (1979–2013)
- Record: 2–21 (4 wins vacated) (1–15 Big East)
- Head coach: Mike Jarvis (6th year)
- Assistant coaches: Kevin Clark; Mike Jarvis II; Dermon Player
- Home arena: Alumni Hall; Madison Square Garden

2003–04 Big East men's basketball standings
	Conf.				Overall
Team	W		L	PCT	W		L	PCT
No. 9 Pittsburgh	13	–	3	.813	31	–	5	.861
No. 7 Connecticut †	12	–	4	.750	33	–	6	.846
No. 21 Providence	11	–	5	.688	20	–	9	.690
No. 20 Syracuse	11	–	5	.688	23	–	8	.742
No. 25 Boston College	10	–	6	.625	24	–	10	.706
Seton Hall	10	–	6	.625	21	–	12	.636
Notre Dame	9	–	7	.563	19	–	13	.594
Virginia Tech	7	–	9	.438	15	–	14	.517
Rutgers	7	–	9	.438	20	–	13	.606
West Virginia	7	–	9	.438	17	–	14	.548
Villanova	6	–	10	.375	18	–	17	.514
Georgetown	4	–	12	.250	13	–	15	.464
Miami (FL)*	4	–	12	.250	14	–	16	.467
St. John's*#	1	–	15	.063	2	–	21	.087
† 2004 Big East tournament winner As of April 5, 2004; Rankings from AP Poll; *Did not qualify for 2004 Big East tournament. #St. John's had 4 regular-season games vacated due to sanctions against the program; the school′s disputed record was 1–15, 6–21.

The 2003–04 St. John's Red Storm men's basketball team represented St. John's University during the 2003–04 NCAA Division I men's basketball season. The team was coached by Mike Jarvis in his sixth year at the school until he was replaced by interim coach Kevin Clark. St. John's home games are played at Carnesecca Arena, then called Alumni Hall, and Madison Square Garden and the team is a member of the Big East Conference.

== Off season ==
=== Departures ===
Name	Number	Pos.	Height	Weight	Year	Hometown	Notes
Tim Doyle	0	G	6'4"	215	Freshman	Merrick, New York	Transferred. Northwestern
Marcus Hatten	1	PG	6'1"	165	Senior	Baltimore, Maryland	Graduated
Tristan Smith	2	PG	6'1"	185	Sophomore	Amityville, New York	Transferred. St. Francis
Eric King	5	SF	6'6"	220	Sophomore	Brooklyn, New York	Transferred. Tennessee State
Anthony Glover	22	PF	6'6"	231	Graduate	Bronx, New York	Graduated.

=== Class of 2003 signees ===
College recruiting information
Name	Hometown	School	Height	Weight	Commit date
Lamont Hamilton; C	Brooklyn, NY	Bridgton Academy	6 ft 10 in (2.08 m)	225 lb (102 kg)	Aug 1, 2003
Lamont Hamilton; C	Recruit ratings: Scout: Rivals: 247Sports:				
Tyler Jones; PF	Denver, CO	Heritage Christian Academy	6 ft 9 in (2.06 m)	210 lb (95 kg)	Aug 1, 2003
Tyler Jones; PF	Recruit ratings: Scout: Rivals: 247Sports:				
Overall recruit ranking:
Note: In many cases, Scout, Rivals, 247Sports, On3, and ESPN may conflict in their listings of height and weight.; In these cases, the average was taken. ESPN grades are on a 100-point scale.; Sources: "2003 Team Ranking". Rivals.

== Roster ==
2003–04 St. John's Red Storm men's basketball team
Players
Coaches

Pos.	#	Name	Height	Weight	Year	Previous school	Hometown
G	0	Nygel Roach (W)	6 ft 3 in (1.91 m)	195 lb (88 kg)	So	Xavier	North Bergen, NJ
G	2	Joe McDonald (W)	5 ft 11 in (1.8 m)	185 lb (84 kg)	Sr	Nassau C.C.	Farmingdale, NY
G	3	Daryll Hill	6 ft 3 in (1.91 m)	170 lb (77 kg)	RS Fr	Milford Academy	Bayside, NY
C	4	Abe Keita (S)	6 ft 11 in (2.11 m)	222 lb (101 kg)	GS	Winchendon	Tolland, CT
G	5	Devin Mayo (W)	6 ft 0 in (1.83 m)	158 lb (72 kg)	Fr	Clinton Christian	Upper Marlboro, MD
F	11	Tyler Jones	6 ft 9 in (2.06 m)	210 lb (95 kg)	Fr	Heritage Christian	Denver, CO
G	12	Elijah Ingram (S)	6 ft 0 in (1.83 m)	170 lb (77 kg)	So	St. Anthony's	East Orange, NJ
G	14	Andre Stanley	6 ft 4 in (1.93 m)	215 lb (98 kg)	Sr	Globe Institute/John Jay	Brooklyn, NY
F	15	Phil Missere (W)	6 ft 9 in (2.06 m)	206 lb (93 kg)	Jr	Cornwall Central	Cornwall, NY
G/F	23	Willie Shaw (S)	6 ft 6 in (1.98 m)	190 lb (86 kg)	Sr	Kennedy	Mount Vernon, NY
F	25	Kyle Cuffe (C)	6 ft 9 in (2.06 m)	236 lb (107 kg)	Sr	Rice	Bronx, NY
F	33	Grady Reynolds (S)	6 ft 7 in (2.01 m)	215 lb (98 kg)	Sr	Abbeville/Southern Union	Abbeville, AL
F/C	34	Lamont Hamilton (S)	6 ft 10 in (2.08 m)	225 lb (102 kg)	Fr	Bridgton Academy	Brooklyn, NY
C	44	Mohamed Diakite (S)	6 ft 11 in (2.11 m)	210 lb (95 kg)	RS Jr	Montrose Christian	Rockville, MD
C	52	Curtis Johnson	7 ft 3 in (2.21 m)	320 lb (145 kg)	Sr	Ryan Academy	Norfolk, VA

Head coach

- Mike Jarvis (Northeastern)

Assistant coach(es)

- Kevin Clark
- Mike Jarvis II
- Dermon Player

Legend

- (C) Team captain
- (S) Suspended
- (I) Ineligible
- (W) Walk-on
- Injured
- Current redshirt

== Schedule and results ==
Date time, TV	Rank^{#}	Opponent^{#}	Result	Record	Site (attendance) city, state
Exhibition
11/04/03*; 7:30pm		SLAM All-Stars	W 82–73		Alumni Hall (3,493); Queens, NY
11/08/03*; 7:30pm		EA Sports	W 80–74		Alumni Hall (N/A); Queens, NY
Regular Season
11/13/03*; 9:00pm, ESPN2		No. 23 Marquette; Coaches vs. Cancer Classic	L 45–52	0–1	Madison Square Garden (6,222); New York, NY
11/24/03*; 7:30pm		Fairfield	L 59–64 ^{OT}	0–2	Alumni Hall (4,336); Queens, NY
11/29/03*; 7:00pm		at Stony Brook	W 72–61	1–2	Stony Brook Arena (3,765); Stony Brook, NY
12/02/03*; 7:30pm		Hofstra	L 64–81	1–3	Alumni Hall (4,164); Queens, NY
12/06/03*; 2:00pm, ESPN		at No. 6 Duke	L 58–79	1–4	Cameron Indoor Stadium (9,314); Durham, NC
12/09/03*; 7:30pm		St. Francis (N.Y.)	W 58–52	2–4	Alumni Hall (4,014); Queens, NY
12/21/03*; 3:00pm, FSNY		at No. 5 Georgia Tech	L 66–79	2–5	Alexander Memorial Coliseum (9,008); Atlanta, GA
12/28/03*; 4:30pm, MSG		vs. Penn; Dreyfus Holiday Festival Opening Round	L 61–63 ^{2OT}	2–6	Madison Square Garden (11,380); New York, NY
12/29/03*; 7:00pm, MSG		vs. Holy Cross; Dreyfus Holiday Festival Consolation	W 64–61	3–6	Madison Square Garden (11,989); New York, NY
01/03/04*; 7:00pm, MSG		Niagara	W 72–65	4–6	Madison Square Garden (11,650); New York, NY
01/07/04; 7:00pm, FSNY		at No. 17 Syracuse	L 59–65	4–7 (0–1)	Carrier Dome (17,033); Syracuse, NY
01/10/04; 2:00pm, MSG		Seton Hall	L 54–71	4–8 (0–2)	Madison Square Garden (8,059); New York, NY
01/14/04; 7:30pm, FSNY		Miami	L 64–70	4–9 (0–3)	Alumni Hall (4,071); Queens, NY
01/18/04; 2:00pm, MSG		at Villanova	L 74–85	4–10 (0–4)	The Pavilion (6,500); Villanova, PA
01/20/04; 7:30pm		at Georgetown	L 69–71	4–11(0–5)	MCI Center (7,203); Washington, D.C.
01/24/04; 4:00pm, MSG		at Rutgers	L 70–78	4–12 (0–6)	Louis Brown Athletic Center (8,097); Piscataway, NJ
01/28/04*; 7:30pm, FSNY		West Virginia	L 64–73	4–13 (0–7)	Alumni Hall (3,923); Queens, NY
01/31/04; 1:30pm, CBS		UCLA	W 71–55	5–13 (0–7)	Madison Square Garden (9,077); New York, NY
02/04/04; 7:00pm, FSNY		at No. 4 Pittsburgh	L 51–71	5–14 (0–8)	Petersen Events Center (12,508); Pittsburgh, PA
02/08/04; 12:00pm, WWOR		Boston College	L 61–89	5–15 (0–9)	Madison Square Garden (7,453); New York, NY
02/11/04; 7:00pm		at West Virginia	L 52–86	5–16 (0–10)	WVU Coliseum (5,816); Morgantown, WV
02/18/04; 7:30pm, MSG		Georgetown	W 65–58	6–16 (1–10)	Madison Square Garden (6,192); New York, NY
02/21/04; 7:00pm, WWOR		at Virginia Tech	L 53–54	6–17 (1–11)	Cassell Coliseum (6,552); Blacksburg, VA
02/24/04; 7:00pm, ESPN2		No. 8 Connecticut	L 53–71	6–18 (1–12)	Madison Square Garden (11,736); New York, NY
02/29/04; 12:00pm, MSG		No. 13 Providence	L 78–103	6–19 (1–13)	Madison Square Garden (6,824); New York, NY
03/03/04; 7:30pm, Metro		at Boston College	L 54–68	6–20 (1–14)	Silvio O. Conte Forum (5,406); Chestnut Hill, MA
03/05/04; 4:00pm, CBS		Notre Dame	L 62–89	6–21 (1–15)	Madison Square Garden (7,543); New York, NY
*Non-conference game. ^{#}Rankings from AP Poll. (#) Tournament seedings in parentheses.
