= 2003–04 Georgetown Hoyas men's basketball team =

American college basketball season

2003–04 Georgetown Hoyas men's basketball
- Conference: Big East
- Record: 13–15 (4–12 Big East)
- Head coach: Craig Esherick (6th season)
- Assistant coaches: Mike Riley (22nd season); Jaren Jackson (1st season); Chuck Driesell (1st season)
- Captains: Courtland Freeman; Gerald Riley
- Home arena: MCI Center

2003–04 Big East men's basketball standings
	Conf.				Overall
Team	W		L	PCT	W		L	PCT
No. 9 Pittsburgh	13	–	3	.813	31	–	5	.861
No. 7 Connecticut †	12	–	4	.750	33	–	6	.846
No. 21 Providence	11	–	5	.688	20	–	9	.690
No. 20 Syracuse	11	–	5	.688	23	–	8	.742
No. 25 Boston College	10	–	6	.625	24	–	10	.706
Seton Hall	10	–	6	.625	21	–	12	.636
Notre Dame	9	–	7	.563	19	–	13	.594
Virginia Tech	7	–	9	.438	15	–	14	.517
Rutgers	7	–	9	.438	20	–	13	.606
West Virginia	7	–	9	.438	17	–	14	.548
Villanova	6	–	10	.375	18	–	17	.514
Georgetown	4	–	12	.250	13	–	15	.464
Miami (FL)*	4	–	12	.250	14	–	16	.467
St. John's*#	1	–	15	.063	2	–	21	.087
† 2004 Big East tournament winner As of April 5, 2004; Rankings from AP Poll; *Did not qualify for 2004 Big East tournament. #St. John's had 4 regular-season games vacated due to sanctions against the program; the school′s disputed record was 1–15, 6–21.

The 2003–04 Georgetown Hoyas men's basketball team represented Georgetown University in the 2003–04 NCAA Division I college basketball season. The Hoyas were coached by Craig Esherick and played their home games at the MCI Center in Washington, DC. The Hoyas were members of the Big East Conference. They finished the season 13–15, 4–12 in Big East play. They lost to Boston College in the first round of the 2004 Big East men's basketball tournament and had no further postseason play. It was the first time since the 1973-74 season that Georgetown did not receive an invitation to either the NCAA Division I men's basketball tournament or the National Invitation Tournament.

== Season Recap ==
Senior forward and team co-captain Gerald Riley started all 28 games, completing his string of starting all 125 games of his collegiate career. With power forward Mike Sweetney having left the team over the offseason, choosing to forgo his senior year to enter the National Basketball Association draft, Riley became the team's offensive centerpiece, and he averaged 33 minutes a game for the year. He put in a strong performance early in the season as the team won its first ten games. Sophomore forward Brandon Bowman, meanwhile, also started all 28 games – as he would all 127 games of his collegiate career – and averaged 34 minutes per game. He scored in double figures 24 times and led the team in scoring 12 times. He also led the team in rebounding 20 times.

Sophomore guard Ashanti Cook became a starter this season, starting all 28 games, as he would every game for the rest of his collegiate career. He scored a season-high 18 points against Connecticut and his 106 assists for the year were twice as many as anyone else on the team. He shot 34.4 percent from the field and only 31.9 percent from three-point range, but averaged 9.2 points per game. Junior forward Darrel Owens started the season strong, averaging in double figures in early games and scoring 20 points against Boston College. He also had ten or more rebounds in two games.

The team opened the season 10–0, including a victory over Rutgers in the Big East opener, but it sorely missed the departed Sweetney and won only three more games as virtually the entire team slumped. Riley excelled in the two victories over Miami, scoring 35 points at Miami and then 37 points against the Hurricanes a week later at the MCI Center, the most points scored by a Georgetown forward in a single game since 1965. In the two Miami games combined, he shot 25-for-32 (78.1%) from the field and a perfect 16-for-16 from the free-throw line. Otherwise, however, his numbers went into decline as the team's fortunes fell. Owens also saw his performance drop; during Georgetown's season-ending nine-game losing streak, he never scored in double figures and averaged only 4.5 points per game. Among Hoya players, only Bowman did not slump. He led the team in rebounds in 15 of the last 17 games of the year. Though he also struggled at the onset of the nine-game losing streak, he shot 46 percent from the field during the final four games of the season compared to 31 percent for the rest of the team. The team averaged 52 points a game during its last four games, and Bowman was responsible for a third of them.

Losing 14 of the final 17 games of the regular season, the team finished the regular season at 13–14 overall and 4–12 in the Big East – the worst conference record it ever had in the 34-season history of the original Big East Conference – and tied for 12th place. It went into the 2004 Big East tournament with an eight-game losing streak and lost in the first round to Boston College. The tournament loss extended the team's losing streak to nine games, tying the school record for the most games lost in a row set by the hapless 3-23 team of 1971–72.

The team's 13–15 final record was the first losing record for a Georgetown team since the 1998–99 team went 15–16 and only the second since the 1972–73 team posted a 12–14 record. With no postseason play, Georgetown missed the NCAA tournament for the third year in a row and for the sixth time in seven years. Although the 2001–02 team had no postseason play after Esherick declined an invitation to the 2002 National Invitation Tournament (NIT), the 2003-04 team was the first Georgetown squad to receive no invitation to either the NCAA tournament or the NIT since 1973-74.

== Esherick fired ==
Craig Esherick – a former Georgetown player who had served as a Hoyas assistant coach for 17½ seasons before succeeding John Thompson, Jr., as head coach in January 1999 – had posted a 103–74 (.582) record during his 5½ seasons as head coach. At the end of the 2002–2003 season, Georgetown had extended his contract through 2009. He indicated to the press late in the 2003–2004 season that his position as head coach was secure, that he had a good recruiting class joining the team for the 2004–2005 season – it included future stars Jeff Green, Roy Hibbert, and Jonathan Wallace – and that they should "stay tuned," and Georgetown president John DeGioia gave him a public show of support around the same time. On March 5, 2004, Esherick said, "I ain't going anywhere – I may be here for another 30 years."

However, after only one NCAA Tournament appearance during Esherick′s tenure, three consecutive seasons without an NCAA Tournament appearance, and a sub-.500 performance in 2003-04 that ended with the record-tying losing streak, DeGioia fired Esherick on March 16, 2004, just six days after the end of the season. Assistant coaches Mike Riley, Jaren Jackson, and Chuck Driesell also left the team at the end of the season, Riley after 22 seasons as an assistant coach at Georgetown and the other two after a single season of coaching the Hoyas.

== Roster ==
#	Name	Height	Weight (lbs.)	Position	Class	Hometown	Previous Team(s)
0	Ashanti Cook	6'2"	175	G	Jr.	Inglewood, CA, U.S.	Westchester HS
1	Brandon Bowman	6'8¾"	213	F	Jr.	Santa Monica, CA, U.S.	Westchester HS
2	Courtland Freeman	6'9"	227	F/|C	Sr.	Myrtle Beach, SC, U.S.	Socastee HS
3	Omari Faulkner	6'6"	205	F	Sr.	Memphis, TN, U.S.	Hamilton HS
4	Kenny Izzo	6'8"	200	F/C	So.	Chicago, IL, U.S.	Fenwick HS
5	Ray Reed	6'0¾"	163	G	So.	Inglewood, CA, U.S.	Inglewood HS
10	RaMell Ross	6'5¾"	201	G/|F	Sr.	Fairfax, VA, U.S.	Lake Braddock Secondary
14	Matt Causey	6'11½"	171	G	So.	Gainesville, GA, U.S.	Berkmar HS
20	Darrell Owens	6'6"	206	F/G	Sr.	Napoleonville, LA, U.S.	Assumption HS
32	Gerald Riley	6'6"	217	G	Sr.	Milledgeville, GA, U.S.	Baldwin HS
40	Ryan Beal	6'5"	194	G	Jr.	Coral Gables, FL, U.S.	Ransom Everglades School
44	Amadou Kilkenny-Diaw	6'8"	220	F/C	Jr.	Washington, DC, U.S.	St. Albans School
52	Sead Dizdarevic	6'8"	230	F	So.	Serbia and Montenegro	North Highland HS

== Rankings ==
The team was not ranked in the Top 25 in either the AP Poll or the Coaches' Poll at any time and was never among other teams receiving votes in either poll.

== 2003–04 Schedule and results ==
Sources

- All times are Eastern

Date time, TV	Rank^{#}	Opponent^{#}	Result	Record	Site (attendance) city, state
Preseason
Sat., Nov. 1, 2003*; 2:00pm		Israeli All-Stars	W 101–64	exhibition	McDonough Gymnasium (N/A); Washington, DC
Regular season
Fri., Nov. 21, 2003*; 7:30 p.m.		Grambling State	W 83–36	1–0	MCI Center (5,437); Washington, DC
Sun., Nov. 23, 2003*; 3:00pm		at Penn State	W 79–78	2–0	Bryce Jordan Center (8,874); University Park, PA
Tue., Nov. 25, 2003*; 7:30pm		Coastal Carolina	W 81–68	3–0	MCI Center (4,189); Washington, DC
Sat., Nov. 29, 2003*; 1:00pm		Delaware State	W 63–54	4–0	MCI Center (5,003); Washington, DC
Wed., Dec. 3, 2003*; 7:30pm		Norfolk State	W 76–53	5–0	MCI Center (4,314); Washington, DC
Sat., Dec. 6, 2003*; 8:00pm		Davidson	W 71–53	6–0	MCI Center (5,657); Washington, DC
Sat., Dec. 13, 2003*; 12:00 noon		Elon	W 91–70	7–0	MCI Center (5,683); Washington, DC
Sat., Dec. 20, 2003*; 1:00pm		Howard	W 89–58	8–0	MCI Center (4,412); Washington, DC
Mon., Dec. 22, 2003*; 7:00pm		at The Citadel	W 85–62	9–0	McAlister Field House (2,431); Charleston, SC
Sat., Jan. 3, 2004; 2:00pm		Rutgers	W 63–57	10–0 (1–0)	MCI Center (8,194); Washington, DC
Tue., Jan. 6, 2004; 7:30pm		Boston College	L 64–72	10–1 (1–1)	MCI Center (7,735); Washington, DC
Sat., Jan. 10, 2004; 12:00 noon		at West Virginia	L 58–62	10–2 (1–2)	WVU Coliseum (6,071); Morgantown, WV
Wed., Jan. 14, 2004; 7:30pm		at No. 1 Connecticut; Rivalry	L 70–94	10–3 (1–3)	Harry A. Gampel Pavilion (10,167); Storrs, CT
Tue., Jan. 20, 2004; 7:30pm		St. John's	W 71–69	11–3 (2–3)	MCI Center (7,203); Washington, DC
Sat., Jan. 24, 2004*; 2:00pm		No. 1 Duke	L 66–85	11–4	MCI Center (20,193); Washington, DC
Mon., Jan. 26, 2004; 7:30pm		at Providence	L 50–65	11–5 (2–4)	Dunkin Donuts Center (10,397); Providence, RI
Sat., Jan. 31, 2004; 7:30pm		at Miami (FL)	W 87–80 ^{OT}	12−5 (3–4)	Convocation Center (5,193); Coral Gables, FL
Thu., Feb. 5, 2004; 7:30pm		Villanova	L 60–75	12–6 (3–5)	MCI Center (7,738); Washington, DC
Sat., Feb. 7, 2004; 7:00pm		Miami (FL)	W 80–64	13–6 (4–5)	MCI Center (10,581); Washington, DC
Wed., Feb. 11, 2004; 7:00pm		at Virginia Tech	L 65–80	13–7 (4–6)	Cassell Coliseum (6,746); Blacksburg, VA
Sat., Feb. 14, 2004*; 2:00pm		at Temple	L 53–59	13–8	Liacouras Center (6,795); Philadelphia, PA
Wed., Feb. 18, 2004; 7:30pm		at St. John's	L 58–65	13–9 (4–7)	Madison Square Garden (6,192); New York, NY
Sat., Feb. 21, 2004; 12:00 noon		Syracuse; Rivalry	L 54–57	13–10 (4–8)	MCI Center (15,389); Washington, DC
Tue., Feb. 24, 2004; 7:30pm		No. 3 Pittsburgh	L 58–68	13–11 (4–9)	MCI Center (11,876); Washington, DC
Sat., Feb. 28, 2004; 7:00pm		at Seton Hall	L 48–75	13–12 (4–10)	Continental Airlines Arena (11,302); East Rutherford, NJ
Thu., Mar. 4, 2004; 7:00pm		at Notre Dame	L 48–61	13–13 (4–11)	Edmund P. Joyce Center (11,418); Notre Dame, IN
Sat., Mar. 6, 2004; 12:00 noon		Virginia Tech	L 55–60	13–14 (4–12)	MCI Center (11,286); Washington, DC
Big East tournament
Wed., Mar. 10, 2004; 2:00pm	(12)	vs. (5) Boston College; First Round	L 57–68	13–15	Madison Square Garden (19,173); New York, NY
*Non-conference game. ^{#}Rankings from AP Poll. (#) Tournament seedings in parentheses.

== Awards and honors ==
=== Big East Conference honors ===
Postseason honors
Honors	Player	Position	Date awarded	Ref.
All-Big East Second Team	Gerald Riley	G		
