= 2003–04 Seton Hall Pirates men's basketball team =

American college basketball season

2003–04 Seton Hall Pirates men's basketball

NCAA tournament, second round
- Conference: Big East Conference
- Record: 21–10 (10–6 Big East)
- Head coach: Louis Orr (3rd season)
- Home arena: Continental Airlines Arena

2003–04 Big East men's basketball standings
	Conf.				Overall
Team	W		L	PCT	W		L	PCT
No. 9 Pittsburgh	13	–	3	.813	31	–	5	.861
No. 7 Connecticut †	12	–	4	.750	33	–	6	.846
No. 21 Providence	11	–	5	.688	20	–	9	.690
No. 20 Syracuse	11	–	5	.688	23	–	8	.742
No. 25 Boston College	10	–	6	.625	24	–	10	.706
Seton Hall	10	–	6	.625	21	–	12	.636
Notre Dame	9	–	7	.563	19	–	13	.594
Virginia Tech	7	–	9	.438	15	–	14	.517
Rutgers	7	–	9	.438	20	–	13	.606
West Virginia	7	–	9	.438	17	–	14	.548
Villanova	6	–	10	.375	18	–	17	.514
Georgetown	4	–	12	.250	13	–	15	.464
Miami (FL)*	4	–	12	.250	14	–	16	.467
St. John's*#	1	–	15	.063	2	–	21	.087
† 2004 Big East tournament winner As of April 5, 2004; Rankings from AP Poll; *Did not qualify for 2004 Big East tournament. #St. John's had 4 regular-season games vacated due to sanctions against the program; the school′s disputed record was 1–15, 6–21.

The 2003–04 Seton Hall Pirates men's basketball team represented Seton Hall University as a member of the Big East Conference during the 2003–04 NCAA men's college basketball season. The team was led by head coach Louis Orr and played their home games at Continental Airlines Arena in East Rutherford, New Jersey.

== Roster ==
2003–04 Seton Hall Pirates men's basketball team
Players
Coaches

Pos.	#	Name	Height	Weight	Year	Previous school	Hometown
F	1	Eric Davis	6 ft 9 in (2.06 m)	225 lb (102 kg)	So	Milford Academy	Philadelphia, Pennsylvania
F	1	Kelly Whitney	6 ft 8 in (2.03 m)	240 lb (109 kg)	So	Christian Faith Center	Chicago, Illinois
G	4	J.R. Morris	6 ft 6 in (1.98 m)	207 lb (94 kg)	So	Heritage Christian	Milwaukee, Wisconsin
G	10	Donald Copeland	5 ft 10 in (1.78 m)	170 lb (77 kg)	So	St. Anthony HS	Jersey City, New Jersey
G	12	Andre Barrett	5 ft 10 in (1.78 m)	170 lb (77 kg)	Sr	Rice HS	The Bronx, New York
F	13	Marcus Toney-El	6 ft 6 in (1.98 m)	210 lb (95 kg)	Sr	Seton Hall Prep	East Orange, New Jersey
G	15	Jerel Cokley	6 ft 2 in (1.88 m)	190 lb (86 kg)	Sr	Queens Village, New York
G	20	Jamar Wise	6 ft 0 in (1.83 m)	170 lb (77 kg)	Sr	Roselle, New Jersey
F	21	Mani Messy	6 ft 7 in (2.01 m)	220 lb (100 kg)	Fr	Cottage Grove HS	Ottawa, Ontario, Canada
C	22	Alexander Gambino	7 ft 0 in (2.13 m)	245 lb (111 kg)	So	Long Island Lutheran HS	Huntington Station, New York
F	23	Damion Fray	6 ft 7 in (2.01 m)	235 lb (107 kg)	Sr	Huntington, New York
G	25	Kevin Grier	6 ft 4 in (1.93 m)	210 lb (95 kg)	Fr	Christian Brothers Academy	Lincroft, New Jersey
F	32	John Allen	6 ft 5 in (1.96 m)	207 lb (94 kg)	Jr	Coatesville HS	Coatesville, Pennsylvania
C	33	Grant Billmeier	6 ft 10 in (2.08 m)	252 lb (114 kg)	Fr	St. Patrick HS	Pennington, New Jersey
F	33	Andre Sweet	6 ft 6 in (1.98 m)	215 lb (98 kg)	Jr	Brother Rice HS	New York, New York

Head coach

- Louis Orr

Assistant coach(es)

Legend

- (C) Team captain
- (S) Suspended
- (I) Ineligible
- (W) Walk-on
- Injured
- Current redshirt

Roster

== Schedule and results ==
Date time, TV	Rank^{#}	Opponent^{#}	Result	Record	Site city, state
Regular Season
Nov 22, 2003*		Morgan State	W 89–62	1–0	Continental Airlines Arena; East Rutherford, New Jersey
Nov 26, 2003*		at Alaska Anchorage; Great Alaska Shootout	W 62–57	2–0	Sullivan Arena; Anchorage, Alaska
Nov 28, 2003*		vs. Purdue; Great Alaska Shootout	L 63–75	2–1	Sullivan Arena; Anchorage, Alaska
Nov 29, 2003*		vs. Liberty; Great Alaska Shootout	W 65–47	3–1	Sullivan Arena; Anchorage, Alaska
Dec 10, 2003*		at Louisville	L 71–80	3–2	Freedom Hall; Louisville, Kentucky
Dec 13, 2003*		Saint Peter's	W 91–62	4–2	Continental Airlines Arena; East Rutherford, New Jersey
Dec 20, 2003*		Ohio State	W 75–59	5–2	Continental Airlines Arena; East Rutherford, New Jersey
Dec 22, 2003*		Davidson	W 73–50	6–2	Continental Airlines Arena; East Rutherford, New Jersey
Dec 27, 2003*		DePaul	W 76–62	7–2	Continental Airlines Arena (7,431); East Rutherford, New Jersey
Dec 30, 2003*; 7:30 p.m.		Monmouth	W 88–61	8–2	Continental Airlines Arena; East Rutherford, New Jersey
Jan 1, 2004*		Rhode Island	W 79–67	9–2	Continental Airlines Arena; East Rutherford, New Jersey
Jan 3, 2004*		at La Salle	W 86–74	10–2	Tom Gola Arena; Philadelphia, Pennsylvania
Jan 10, 2004; 2:00 p.m., MSG		at St. John's	W 71–54	11–2 (1–0)	Madison Square Garden (8,059); New York, New York
Jan 12, 2004; 8:00 p.m., Cox Sports		Providence	L 60–63	11–3 (1–1)	Continental Airlines Arena (7,737); East Rutherford, New Jersey
Jan 17, 2004; 2:00 p.m.		at Boston College	L 63–72	11–4 (1–2)	Silvio O. Conte Forum; Chestnut Hill, Massachusetts
Jan 20, 2004		Syracuse	W 74–67	12–4 (2–2)	Continental Airlines Arena; East Rutherford, New Jersey
Jan 24, 2004		Virginia Tech	W 83–76	13–4 (3–2)	Continental Airlines Arena; East Rutherford, New Jersey
Feb 1, 2004; 12:00 p.m., Cox Sports		at No. 23 Providence	W 55–46	14–4 (4–2)	Dunkin' Donuts Center (10,191); Providence, Rhode Island
Feb 4, 2004		at West Virginia	L 64–69	14–5 (4–3)	WVU Coliseum; Morgantown, West Virginia
Feb 7, 2004		Rutgers	W 85–58	15–5 (5–3)	Continental Airlines Arena; East Rutherford, New Jersey
Feb 9, 2004		Pittsburgh	W 68–67 ^{2OT}	16–5 (6–3)	Continental Airlines Arena; East Rutherford, New Jersey
Feb 14, 2004		at Notre Dame	L 68–71	16–6 (6–4)	Joyce Center; South Bend, Indiana
Feb 16, 2004; 8:00 p.m.		Boston College	L 63–67	16–7 (6–5)	Continental Airlines Arena; East Rutherford, New Jersey
Feb 21, 2004		Villanova	W 70–68	17–7 (7–5)	Continental Airlines Arena; East Rutherford, New Jersey
Feb 24, 2004		at Miami (FL)	W 76–66	18–7 (8–5)	Convocation Center; Coral Gables, Florida
Feb 28, 2004		Georgetown	W 75–48	19–7 (9–5)	Continental Airlines Arena; East Rutherford, New Jersey
Mar 1, 2004; 7:00 p.m., ESPN		at No. 8 Connecticut	L 67–89	19–8 (9–6)	Harry A. Gampel Pavilion (10,167); Storrs, Connecticut
Mar 7, 2004		at Rutgers	W 66–64	20–8 (10–6)	Louis Brown Athletic Center; Piscataway, New Jersey
Big East Tournament
Mar 10, 2004*	(6)	vs. (11) Villanova; First Round	L 60–61	20–9	Madison Square Garden; New York, New York
NCAA Tournament
Mar 18, 2004*	(8 ATL)	vs. (9 ATL) No. 22 Arizona; First Round	W 80–76	21–9	RBC Center; Raleigh, North Carolina
Mar 20, 2004*; CBS	(8 ATL)	vs. (1 ATL) No. 6 Duke; Second Round	L 62–90	21–10	RBC Center; Raleigh, North Carolina
*Non-conference game. ^{#}Rankings from AP Poll. (#) Tournament seedings in parentheses. ATL=Atlanta. All times are in Eastern Time.
