= 2003–04 Virginia Tech Hokies men's basketball team =

American college basketball season

2003–04 Virginia Tech Hokies men's basketball
- Conference: Big East Conference
- Record: 15-14 (7-9 ACC)
- Head coach: Seth Greenberg (1st season)
- Assistant coaches: Brad Greenberg; Ryan Odom; Eric Skeeters
- Home arena: Cassell Coliseum

2003–04 Big East men's basketball standings
	Conf.				Overall
Team	W		L	PCT	W		L	PCT
No. 9 Pittsburgh	13	–	3	.813	31	–	5	.861
No. 7 Connecticut †	12	–	4	.750	33	–	6	.846
No. 21 Providence	11	–	5	.688	20	–	9	.690
No. 20 Syracuse	11	–	5	.688	23	–	8	.742
No. 25 Boston College	10	–	6	.625	24	–	10	.706
Seton Hall	10	–	6	.625	21	–	12	.636
Notre Dame	9	–	7	.563	19	–	13	.594
Virginia Tech	7	–	9	.438	15	–	14	.517
Rutgers	7	–	9	.438	20	–	13	.606
West Virginia	7	–	9	.438	17	–	14	.548
Villanova	6	–	10	.375	18	–	17	.514
Georgetown	4	–	12	.250	13	–	15	.464
Miami (FL)*	4	–	12	.250	14	–	16	.467
St. John's*#	1	–	15	.063	2	–	21	.087
† 2004 Big East tournament winner As of April 5, 2004; Rankings from AP Poll; *Did not qualify for 2004 Big East tournament. #St. John's had 4 regular-season games vacated due to sanctions against the program; the school′s disputed record was 1–15, 6–21.

The 2003–04 Virginia Tech Hokies men's basketball team represented Virginia Tech during the 2003-04 NCAA Division 1 men's basketball season. Led by 1st-year head coach Seth Greenberg, the Hokies played their home games at Cassell Coliseum in Blacksburg, Virginia, during their last season in the Big East Conference. The Hokies finished 15–14 on the season and 7–9 in conference. In the Big East Conference Tournament the Hokies beat the Rutgers in the first round, But fell short to Pittsburgh in the quarter-finals.

== Previous season ==
In the 2002-03 NCAA Division I men's basketball season the Virginia Tech Hokies men's basketball team represented Virginia Tech during its penultimate season in the Big East Conference. The team was led by third-year head coach Ricky Stokes. The Hokies finished the season 12–17 overall, and 4–12 in conference play failing to qualify for the 2003 Big East Conference Tournament.

== Roster ==
2003–04 Virginia Tech Hokies men's basketball team
Players
Coaches
|

Pos.	#	Name	Height	Weight	Year	Previous school	Hometown
G	1	Zabian Dowdell	6 ft 2 in (1.88 m)	190 lb (86 kg)	Fr	Pahokee High School	Pahokee, FL
G	2	Jamon Gordon	6 ft 3 in (1.91 m)	190 lb (86 kg)	Fr	Andrew Jackson High School	Jacksonville, Fl
G	3	Davis Stubbs	6 ft 1 in (1.85 m)	170 lb (77 kg)	Fr	Carolina Day School/New Hampton High School	Asheville, N.C
F	4	Fabian Davis	6 ft 6 in (1.98 m)	215 lb (98 kg)	So	Southern Durham High School/Bonner Academy	Durham, N.C
G	5	Bryan Randall	6 ft 1 in (1.85 m)	221 lb (100 kg)	Jr	Bruton High School	Williamsburg, VA
G	11	Bob Ritchie	6 ft 5 in (1.96 m)	190 lb (86 kg)	So	Lake Braddock High School	Burke, VA
G	15	Mykhael Lattimore	6 ft 4 in (1.93 m)	195 lb (88 kg)	Fr	Morristown High School/Lawrenceville School	Morristown, N.J.
F	21	Allen Calloway	6 ft 8 in (2.03 m)	205 lb (93 kg)	So	Tunstall,Coastal Christian Academy	Gretna, VA
G/F	22	Bryant Matthews	6 ft 7 in (2.01 m)	215 lb (98 kg)	Sr	Columbia High School	Columbia, S.C
G	23	Shawn Harris	6 ft 4 in (1.93 m)	215 lb (98 kg)	So	Matoaca High School/Fork Union Military Academy	Ettrick, VA
G	24	Markus Sailes	6 ft 5 in (1.96 m)	205 lb (93 kg)	RS So	Varina High School	Richmond, VA
F	25	Philip McCandies	6 ft 9 in (2.06 m)	215 lb (98 kg)	So	Parkland High School	Winston-Salem, N.C.
G/F	32	Carlos Dixon	6 ft 7 in (2.01 m)	195 lb (88 kg)	RS Jr	South Rowan High School, Fork Union Military Academy	Salisbury, NC
F	33	Coleman Collins	6 ft 8 in (2.03 m)	215 lb (98 kg)	Fr	Chamblee High School	Stone Mountain, GA
F	42	Chris Tucker (W)	6 ft 7 in (2.01 m)	200 lb (91 kg)	Fr	Lord Botetourt High School,Fork Union Military Academy	Fincastle, VA

Head coach

- Seth Greenberg (Fairleigh Dickinson)

Assistant coach(es)

- Brad Greenberg (American)
- Ryan Odom (Hampden–Sydney)
- Eric Skeeters (Coppin State)

Legend

- (C) Team captain
- (S) Suspended
- (I) Ineligible
- (W) Walk-on
- Injured
- Current redshirt

Roster

== 2003–2004 schedule and results ==
Date time, TV	Rank^{#}	Opponent^{#}	Result	Record	Site city, state
Regular season
Nov 22, 2003*		New Hampshire	W 79-49	1–0	Cassell Coliseum; Blacksburg, VA
Nov 25, 2003*		Western Carolina	W 61-58	2–0	Cassell Coliseum; Blacksburg, VA
Nov 28, 2003; 8:00 p.m., FSS/CSN		at Virginia	L 65-80	2–1	University Hall (7,771); Charlottesville, VA
Dec 1, 2003*		Morgan State	W 76-66	3-1	Cassell Coliseum; Blacksburg, VA
Dec 4, 2003*		Old Dominion	L 92-94	3-2	Cassell Coliseum; Blacksburg, VA
Dec 6, 2003*		at Ohio State	L 57-62	3-3	Value City Arena; Columbus, OH
Dec 10, 2003*		VMI	W 77-5	4-3	Cassell Coliseum; Blacksburg, VA
Dec 13, 2003		Radford	W 73-60	5-3	Cassell Coliseum; Blacksburg, VA
Dec 20, 2003*		at Towson	L 74-76	6-3	Towson Center; Towson, MD
Dec 23, 2003*		William & Mary	W 80-54	7-3	Cassell Coliseum; Blacksburg, VA
Dec 27, 2003*		vs. East Carolina	L 67-74	7-4	Ted Constant Convocation Center; Norfolk, VA
Jan 6, 2004		at No. 15 Pittsburgh	L 59-78	7-5 (0-1)	Petersen Events Center; Pittsburgh, PA
Jan 14, 2004		at West Virginia	W 69-67	8-5 (1-1)	WVU Coliseum; Morgantown, WV
Jan 17, 2004		Miami (FL)	L 59-65	8-6 (1-2)	Cassell Coliseum; Blacksburg, VA
Jan 20, 2004		Notre Dame	L 63-74	8-7 (1-3)	Cassell Coliseum; Blacksburg, VA
Jan 24, 2004		at Seton Hall	L 76-83	8-8 (1-4)	Continental Airlines Arena; Rutherford, NJ
Jan 28, 2004; 7:00 p.m., WTXX		No. 6 Connecticut	L 60-96	8-9 (1-5)	Cassell Coliseum (7,908); Blacksburg, VA
Jan 31, 2004		at No. 20 Syracuse	L 64-76	8-10 (1-6)	Carrier Dome; Syracuse, NY
Feb 4, 2004; 7:00 p.m.		No. 23 Providence	W 69-57	9-10 (2-6)	Cassell Coliseum (6,323); Blacksburg, VA
Feb 11, 2004; 7:00 p.m.		Georgetown	W 80-65	10-10 (3-6)	Cassell Coliseum (6,746); Blacksburg, VA
Feb 15, 2004		at Rutgers	L 52-85	10-11 (3-7)	Louis Brown Athletic Center; Piscataway, NJ
Feb 18, 2004		at Villanova	L 68-80	10-12 (4-7)	Wachovia Center; Philadelphia, PA
Feb 21, 2004; 7:00 p.m., WWOR		St. John's	W 54-53	11-12 (5-7)	Cassell Coliseum (6,552); Blacksburg, VA
Feb 25, 2004; 7:30 p.m.		at Boston College	L 48-56	11-13 (5-8)	Silvio O. Conte Forum; Boston, MA
Feb 28, 2004		West Virginia	W 53-49	12-13 (6-8)	Cassell Coliseum; Blacksburg, VA
Mar 3, 2004		Rutgers	W 71-70	13-13 (7-8)	Cassell Coliseum; Blacksburg, VA
Mar 6, 2004; 12:00 p.m.		at Georgetown	W 60-55	14-13 (8-8)	Verizon Center (11,286); Washington, D.C.
Big East tournament
Mar 10, 2004	(9)	vs. (8) Rutgers; First round	W 61-58	15-13 (9-8)	Madison Square Garden; New York, NY
Mar 11, 2004	(9)	vs. (1) No. 6 Pittsburgh; Quarterfinals	L 61-74	15-14 (9-9)	Madison Square Garden; New York, NY
*Non-conference game. ^{#}Rankings from AP Poll. (#) Tournament seedings in parentheses. All times are in Eastern Time.
