= 2003–04 West Virginia Mountaineers men's basketball team =

American college basketball season

2003–04 West Virginia Mountaineers men's basketball

NIT, Third round
- Conference: Big East Conference
- Record: 17-14 (7-9 Big East)
- Head coach: John Beilein
- Home arena: WVU Coliseum

2003–04 Big East men's basketball standings
	Conf.				Overall
Team	W		L	PCT	W		L	PCT
No. 9 Pittsburgh	13	–	3	.813	31	–	5	.861
No. 7 Connecticut †	12	–	4	.750	33	–	6	.846
No. 21 Providence	11	–	5	.688	20	–	9	.690
No. 20 Syracuse	11	–	5	.688	23	–	8	.742
No. 25 Boston College	10	–	6	.625	24	–	10	.706
Seton Hall	10	–	6	.625	21	–	12	.636
Notre Dame	9	–	7	.563	19	–	13	.594
Virginia Tech	7	–	9	.438	15	–	14	.517
Rutgers	7	–	9	.438	20	–	13	.606
West Virginia	7	–	9	.438	17	–	14	.548
Villanova	6	–	10	.375	18	–	17	.514
Georgetown	4	–	12	.250	13	–	15	.464
Miami (FL)*	4	–	12	.250	14	–	16	.467
St. John's*#	1	–	15	.063	2	–	21	.087
† 2004 Big East tournament winner As of April 5, 2004; Rankings from AP Poll; *Did not qualify for 2004 Big East tournament. #St. John's had 4 regular-season games vacated due to sanctions against the program; the school′s disputed record was 1–15, 6–21.

The 2003–04 West Virginia Mountaineers men's basketball team represented West Virginia University from Morgantown, West Virginia during the 2003-04 season. The team was led by head coach John Beilein and played their home games at WVU Coliseum.

On December 20, 2003, Florida defeated West Virginia 70–57 in the Orange Bowl Basketball Classic.

West Virginia finished the season with a 17–14 record. They were eliminated by Notre Dame in the Big East tournament first round 65–64. In the 2004 NIT, they lost in the third round to Rutgers 67–64.
