= 2003–04 Connecticut Huskies men's basketball team =

American college basketball season

2003–04 Connecticut Huskies men's basketball

NCAA tournament National Champions Big East tournament champions

National Championship Game, W 82–73 vs. Georgia Tech
- Conference: Big East Conference

Ranking
- Coaches: No. 1
- AP: No. 7
- Record: 33–6 (12–4 Big East)
- Head coach: Jim Calhoun (18th season)
- Assistant coaches: Tom Moore; George Blaney; Clyde Vaughan
- Home arena: Harry A. Gampel Pavilion; Hartford Civic Center

2003–04 Big East men's basketball standings
	Conf.				Overall
Team	W		L	PCT	W		L	PCT
No. 9 Pittsburgh	13	–	3	.813	31	–	5	.861
No. 7 Connecticut †	12	–	4	.750	33	–	6	.846
No. 21 Providence	11	–	5	.688	20	–	9	.690
No. 20 Syracuse	11	–	5	.688	23	–	8	.742
No. 25 Boston College	10	–	6	.625	24	–	10	.706
Seton Hall	10	–	6	.625	21	–	12	.636
Notre Dame	9	–	7	.563	19	–	13	.594
Virginia Tech	7	–	9	.438	15	–	14	.517
Rutgers	7	–	9	.438	20	–	13	.606
West Virginia	7	–	9	.438	17	–	14	.548
Villanova	6	–	10	.375	18	–	17	.514
Georgetown	4	–	12	.250	13	–	15	.464
Miami (FL)*	4	–	12	.250	14	–	16	.467
St. John's*#	1	–	15	.063	2	–	21	.087
† 2004 Big East tournament winner As of April 5, 2004; Rankings from AP Poll; *Did not qualify for 2004 Big East tournament. #St. John's had 4 regular-season games vacated due to sanctions against the program; the school′s disputed record was 1–15, 6–21.

The 2003–04 Connecticut Huskies men's basketball team represented the University of Connecticut in the 2003–2004 NCAA Division I basketball season. Coached by Jim Calhoun, the Huskies played their home games at the Hartford Civic Center in Hartford, Connecticut, and on campus at the Harry A. Gampel Pavilion in Storrs, Connecticut, and were a member of the Big East Conference. They won their record-tying sixth Big East tournament. On April 6, 2004, UConn claimed their second national championship by defeating Georgia Tech, 82–73.

== Roster ==
2003–04 Connecticut Huskies men's basketball team
Players
Coaches

Pos.	#	Name	Height	Weight	Year	Hometown
SG	31	Rashad Anderson	6 ft 5 in (1.96 m)	190 lb (86 kg)	So	Lakeland, Florida
PF	11	Hilton Armstrong	6 ft 10 in (2.08 m)	210 lb (95 kg)	So	Peekskill, New York
SG	24	Jason Baisch	6 ft 6 in (1.98 m)	250 lb (113 kg)	Jr	Southbury, Connecticut
C	21	Josh Boone	6 ft 10 in (2.08 m)	230 lb (104 kg)	Fr	Mt. Airy, Maryland
SG	33	Denham Brown	6 ft 5 in (1.96 m)	205 lb (93 kg)	So	Toronto, Ontario, Canada
PG	12	Taliek Brown (C)	6 ft 1 in (1.85 m)	200 lb (91 kg)	Sr	Queens, New York
PG	40	Justin Evanovich	6 ft 3 in (1.91 m)	195 lb (88 kg)	Sr	Ann Arbor, Michigan
SG	4	Ben Gordon (C)	6 ft 2 in (1.88 m)	195 lb (88 kg)	Jr	Mt. Vernon, New York
PF	32	Ed Nelson (I) (redshirt)	6 ft 8 in (2.03 m)	265 lb (120 kg)	Jr	Ft. Lauderdale, Florida
C	50	Emeka Okafor (C)	6 ft 9 in (2.06 m)	252 lb (114 kg)	Jr	Bellaire, Texas
SG	2	Ryan Swaller	6 ft 5 in (1.96 m)	208 lb (94 kg)	Sr	Milford, Connecticut
SF	13	Ryan Thompson	6 ft 6 in (1.98 m)	215 lb (98 kg)	Jr	Gold Coast, Australia
SG	30	Shamon Tooles (C)	6 ft 5 in (1.96 m)	225 lb (102 kg)	Sr	Coatesville, Pennsylvania
PF	3	Charlie Villanueva	6 ft 10 in (2.08 m)	230 lb (104 kg)	Fr	Brooklyn, New York
SF	23	Marcus White	6 ft 8 in (2.03 m)	215 lb (98 kg)	So	Chicago, Illinois
PG	5	Marcus Williams (S)	6 ft 3 in (1.91 m)	200 lb (91 kg)	Fr	Los Angeles, California

Head coach

Jim Calhoun

Assistant coach(es)

George Blaney
Tom Moore
Clyde Vaughan

Legend

- (C) Team captain
- (S) Suspended
- (I) Ineligible
- (W) Walk-on
- Injured
- Current redshirt

Roster
Last update: January 23, 2011

== Schedule and results ==
Date time, TV	Rank^{#}	Opponent^{#}	Result	Record	Site (attendance) city, state
Exhibition games
November 3*		Team Nike	W 96–78	0–0	Harry A. Gampel Pavilion; Storrs, Connecticut
November 13*		Beltway Ballers	W 102–44	0–0	Hartford Civic Center; Hartford, Connecticut
Regular Season
November 17*; 7:00 pm, ESPN2	No. 1	Yale; Preseason NIT First round	W 70–60	1–0	Harry A. Gampel Pavilion (10,167); Storrs, Connecticut
November 19*; 7:00 pm, ESPN	No. 1	Nevada; Preseason NIT Second round	W 93–79	2–0	Harry A. Gampel Pavilion (10,167); Storrs, Connecticut
November 22*; 12:00 pm, Fox 61	No. 1	Sacred Heart	W 111–64	3–0	Hartford Civic Center (16,085); Hartford, Connecticut
November 26*; 9:30 pm, ESPN	No. 1	vs. Georgia Tech; Preseason NIT Semifinals	L 61–77	3–1	Madison Square Garden (7,607); New York City
November 28*; 4:30 pm, ESPN	No. 1	vs. Utah; Preseason NIT Consolation Game	W 76–44	4–1	Madison Square Garden (8,910); New York
December 1*; 7:00 pm, WTXX	No. 4	Lehigh	W 75–55	5–1	Hartford Civic Center (16,103); Hartford, Connecticut
December 6*; 7:00 pm, WTXX	No. 4	Army	W 74–46	6–1	Harry A. Gampel Pavilion (10,167); Storrs, Connecticut
December 13*; 7:00 pm, Fox 61	No. 3	Quinnipiac	W 88–55	7–1	Harry A. Gampel Pavilion (10,167); Storrs, Connecticut
December 20*; 12:00 pm, WTXX	No. 2	Iona	W 104–54	8–1	Hartford Civic Center (16,294); Hartford, Connecticut
December 28*; 2:00 pm, WTXX	No. 2	Ball State	W 101–62	9–1	Hartford Civic Center (16,294); Hartford, Connecticut
December 30*; 7:00 pm	No. 1	Massachusetts	W 91–67	10–1	Hartford Civic Center (16,294); Hartford, Connecticut
January 2*; 8:05 pm, NESN	No. 1	at Rice	W 92–83	11–1	Autry Court (4,653); Houston
January 6; 7:30 pm, Fox 61	No. 1	at Rutgers	W 75–74	12–1 (1–0)	Louis Brown Athletic Center (8,044); Piscataway, New Jersey
January 11*; 4:30 pm, CBS	No. 1	No. 7 Oklahoma	W 86–59	13–1	Harry A. Gampel Pavilion (10,167); Storrs, Connecticut
January 14; 7:30 pm, WTXX	No. 1	Georgetown; Rivalry	W 94–70	14–1 (2–0)	Harry A. Gampel Pavilion (10,167); Storrs, Connecticut
January 17*; 3:30 pm, CBS	No. 1	at No. 11 North Carolina	L 83–86	14–2	Dean Smith Center (21,750); Chapel Hill, North Carolina
January 19; 7:00 pm, ESPN	No. 4	No. 9 Pittsburgh	W 68–65	15–2 (3–0)	Hartford Civic Center (16,294); Hartford, Connecticut
January 24; 12:00 pm, Fox 61	No. 4	Providence	L 56–66	15–3 (3–1)	Hartford Civic Center (16,294); Hartford, Connecticut
January 28; 7:00 pm, WTXX	No. 8	at Virginia Tech	W 96–60	16–3 (4–1)	Cassell Coliseum (7,908); Blacksburg, Virginia
January 31; 4:00 pm, Fox 61	No. 8	at Boston College	W 63–58	17–3 (5–1)	Conte Forum (8,606); Chestnut Hill, Massachusetts
February 2; 7:00 pm, ESPN	No. 6	No. 20 Syracuse; Rivalry	W 84–56	18–3 (6–1)	Hartford Civic Center (16,294); Hartford, Connecticut
February 7; 2:00 pm, WTXX	No. 5	West Virginia	W 88–58	19–3 (7–1)	Harry A. Gampel Pavilion (10,167); Storrs, Connecticut
February 9; 7:00 pm, ESPN	No. 5	at Notre Dame	L 74–80	19–4 (7–2)	Edmund P. Joyce Center (11,418); South Bend, Indiana
February 15; 1:30 pm, ABC	No. 5	at No. 4 Pittsburgh	L 68–75	19–5 (7–3)	Petersen Events Center (12,817); Pittsburgh
February 18; 7:00 pm, WTXX	No. 8	Miami	W 76–63	20–5 (8–3)	Hartford Civic Center (16,294); Hartford, Connecticut
February 21; 2:00 pm, CBS	No. 8	Notre Dame	W 61–50	21–5 (9–3)	Hartford Civic Center (16,294); Hartford, Connecticut
February 24; 7:00 pm, ESPN2	No. 8	at St. John's	W 71–53	22–5 (10–3)	Madison Square Garden (11,736); New York
February 28; 2:30 pm, ESPN	No. 8	at Villanova	W 75–74	23–5 (11–3)	Wachovia Center (16,392); Philadelphia
March 1; 7:00 pm, ESPN	No. 8	Seton Hall	W 89–67	24–5 (12–3)	Harry A. Gampel Pavilion (10,167); Storrs, Connecticut
March 7; 2:00 pm, CBS	No. 7	at No. 24 Syracuse; Rivalry	L 56–67	24–6 (12–4)	Carrier Dome (32,944); Syracuse, New York
Big East tournament
March 11; 7:00 pm, ESPN2	No. 9	vs. Notre Dame; Quarterfinals	W 66–58	25–6	Madison Square Garden (19,528); New York
March 12; 9:30 pm, ESPN	No. 9	vs. Villanova; Semifinals	W 84–67	26–6	Madison Square Garden (19,528); New York
March 13; 8:00 pm, ESPN	No. 9	vs. No. 6 Pittsburgh; Championship game	W 61–58	27–6	Madison Square Garden (19,528); New York
NCAA tournament
March 18*; 7:10 pm, CBS	(2 P) No. 7	vs. (15 P) Vermont; First Round	W 70–53	28–6	HSBC Arena (18,686); Buffalo, New York
March 20*; 7:58 pm, CBS	(2 P) No. 7	vs. (7 P) DePaul; Second Round	W 72–55	29–6	HSBC Arena (18,686); Buffalo, New York
March 25*; 7:10 pm, CBS	(2 P) No. 7	vs. (6 P) Vanderbilt; Sweet Sixteen	W 73–53	30–6	America West Arena (17,889); Phoenix, Arizona
March 27*; 4:40 pm, CBS	(2 P) No. 7	vs. (8 P) Alabama; Elite Eight	W 87–71	31–6	America West Arena (17,889); Phoenix, Arizona
April 3*; 8:58 pm, CBS	(2 P) No. 7	vs. (1 A) No. 6 Duke; Final Four	W 79–78	32–6	Alamodome (44,417); San Antonio
April 5*; 9:21 pm, CBS	(2 P) No. 7	vs. (3 S) No. 14 Georgia Tech; Championship game	W 82–73	33–6	Alamodome (44,468); San Antonio, Texas
*Non-conference game. ^{#}Rankings from Coaches' Poll. P denotes Phoenix Region, A denotes Atlanta Region, S denotes St. Louis Region. (#) Tournament seedings in parentheses. All times are in Eastern Time.

== Rankings ==
Ranking movements Legend: ██ Increase in ranking ██ Decrease in ranking
	Week																		
Poll	Pre	1	2	3	4	5	6	7	8	9	10	11	12	13	14	15	16	17	Final
AP	1 69	1 69	3 1	2 9	1 21	1 21	1 37	1 50	1 52	4	6	5	5	8	8	7	9	7	Not released
Coaches	1 25	1 27	4 1	3 4	2 4	2 4	1 18	1 24	1 24	4	8	5	5	8	8	8	9	7	1 31

*AP did not release a Week 1 poll nor post-NCAA Tournament rankings

== Awards and honors ==
- Emeka Okafor, NCAA Men's MOP Award

== Team players drafted into the NBA ==
Year	Round	Pick	Player	NBA club
2004	1	2	Emeka Okafor	Charlotte Bobcats
2004	1	3	Ben Gordon	Chicago Bulls
2005	1	7	Charlie Villanueva	Toronto Raptors
2006	1	12	Hilton Armstrong	New Orleans Hornets
2006	1	22	Marcus Williams	New Jersey Nets
2006	1	23	Josh Boone	New Jersey Nets
2006	2	40	Denham Brown	Seattle SuperSonics
