= 2003–04 Miami Hurricanes men's basketball team =

American college basketball season

2003–04 Miami Hurricanes men's basketball

Orange Bowl Classic Champion
- Conference: Big East Conference
- Record: 14-16 (4-12 Big East)
- Head coach: Perry Clark
- Home arena: Convocation Center

2003–04 Big East men's basketball standings
	Conf.				Overall
Team	W		L	PCT	W		L	PCT
No. 9 Pittsburgh	13	–	3	.813	31	–	5	.861
No. 7 Connecticut †	12	–	4	.750	33	–	6	.846
No. 21 Providence	11	–	5	.688	20	–	9	.690
No. 20 Syracuse	11	–	5	.688	23	–	8	.742
No. 25 Boston College	10	–	6	.625	24	–	10	.706
Seton Hall	10	–	6	.625	21	–	12	.636
Notre Dame	9	–	7	.563	19	–	13	.594
Virginia Tech	7	–	9	.438	15	–	14	.517
Rutgers	7	–	9	.438	20	–	13	.606
West Virginia	7	–	9	.438	17	–	14	.548
Villanova	6	–	10	.375	18	–	17	.514
Georgetown	4	–	12	.250	13	–	15	.464
Miami (FL)*	4	–	12	.250	14	–	16	.467
St. John's*#	1	–	15	.063	2	–	21	.087
† 2004 Big East tournament winner As of April 5, 2004; Rankings from AP Poll; *Did not qualify for 2004 Big East tournament. #St. John's had 4 regular-season games vacated due to sanctions against the program; the school′s disputed record was 1–15, 6–21.

The 2003–04 Miami Hurricanes men's basketball team represented the University of Miami during the 2003–04 NCAA Division I men's basketball season. The Hurricanes, led by head coach Perry Clark, played their home games at the Convocation Center and were members of the Big East Conference.

On December 20, 2003, Miami defeated Temple 72-66 in the Orange Bowl Basketball Classic.

Miami failed to qualify for the 2004 Big East tournament. Their season ended with a 58–53 loss to West Virginia on March 6, 2004.
