= 2003–04 Syracuse Orangemen basketball team =

American college basketball season

2003–04 Syracuse Orange men's basketball

NCAA tournament, Sweet Sixteen
- Conference: Big East Conference

Ranking
- Coaches: No. 19
- AP: No. 20
- Record: 23–8 (11–5 Big East)
- Head coach: Jim Boeheim (28th season)
- Assistant coaches: Bernie Fine (28th season); Mike Hopkins (9th season); Troy Weaver (4th season)
- Home arena: Carrier Dome

2003–04 Big East men's basketball standings
	Conf.				Overall
Team	W		L	PCT	W		L	PCT
No. 9 Pittsburgh	13	–	3	.813	31	–	5	.861
No. 7 Connecticut †	12	–	4	.750	33	–	6	.846
No. 21 Providence	11	–	5	.688	20	–	9	.690
No. 20 Syracuse	11	–	5	.688	23	–	8	.742
No. 25 Boston College	10	–	6	.625	24	–	10	.706
Seton Hall	10	–	6	.625	21	–	12	.636
Notre Dame	9	–	7	.563	19	–	13	.594
Virginia Tech	7	–	9	.438	15	–	14	.517
Rutgers	7	–	9	.438	20	–	13	.606
West Virginia	7	–	9	.438	17	–	14	.548
Villanova	6	–	10	.375	18	–	17	.514
Georgetown	4	–	12	.250	13	–	15	.464
Miami (FL)*	4	–	12	.250	14	–	16	.467
St. John's*#	1	–	15	.063	2	–	21	.087
† 2004 Big East tournament winner As of April 5, 2004; Rankings from AP Poll; *Did not qualify for 2004 Big East tournament. #St. John's had 4 regular-season games vacated due to sanctions against the program; the school′s disputed record was 1–15, 6–21.

The 2003–04 Syracuse Orangemen men's basketball team represented Syracuse University in NCAA men's basketball competition in the 2003–04 Division I season. The head coach was Jim Boeheim, serving for his 28th year. The team played its home games at the Carrier Dome in Syracuse, New York. The team finished with a 23–8 (11–5) record, while making it to the Sweet 16 round of the NCAA tournament. The team was led by junior Hakim Warrick and sophomore Gerry McNamara. Senior Jeremy McNeil, juniors Craig Forth and Josh Pace and sophomore Billy Edelin were also major contributors.

This was the last season for Syracuse men's basketball under the Orangemen nickname. (At that time, women's teams and athletes were known as "Orangewomen".) Effective with the 2004–05 academic year, the school nickname became "Orange" for both men and women.

== Roster ==
- Hakim Warrick (19.8 ppg, 8.7 rpg)
- Gerry McNamara (17.2 ppg, 3.8 apg)
- Billy Edelin (13.8 ppg, 5.2 apg)
- Josh Pace (9.5 ppg, 5.3 rpg)
- Craig Forth (5.7 ppg, 5.8 rpg)
- Demetris Nichols (4.2 ppg, 2.2 rpg)
- Louie McCroskey (3.9 ppg, 2.2 rpg)
- Jeremy McNeil (3.0 ppg, 2.7 rpg)
- Terrence Roberts (2.1 ppg, 2.0 rpg)

== Developments ==
- Syracuse would eventually lose in the Sweet 16 round to Alabama.
- McNamara scored 43 points on 11-of-17 shooting from the floor, as Syracuse topped Brigham Young, 80–75, in the second round of the NCAA Tournament.
- Syracuse handed Pittsburgh its first ever loss at the Peterson Center, 49–46 (OT), on a buzzer-beater in overtime by McNamara, and also concluded its regular season by topping Connecticut, 67–56, which would go on to win the National Championship.
- Billy Edelin played just 17 games and left the team for undisclosed reasons in January.
- Syracuse lost would-be sophomore Carmelo Anthony to the NBA Draft (3rd to the Denver Nuggets) and Kueth Duany to graduation.
