= 2003–04 Notre Dame Fighting Irish men's basketball team =

American college basketball season

2003–04 Notre Dame Fighting Irish men's basketball

NIT, Quarterfinals
- Conference: Big East Conference
- Record: 19–13 (9–7 Big East)
- Head coach: Mike Brey (4th season)
- Home arena: Joyce Center

2003–04 Big East men's basketball standings
	Conf.				Overall
Team	W		L	PCT	W		L	PCT
No. 9 Pittsburgh	13	–	3	.813	31	–	5	.861
No. 7 Connecticut †	12	–	4	.750	33	–	6	.846
No. 21 Providence	11	–	5	.688	20	–	9	.690
No. 20 Syracuse	11	–	5	.688	23	–	8	.742
No. 25 Boston College	10	–	6	.625	24	–	10	.706
Seton Hall	10	–	6	.625	21	–	12	.636
Notre Dame	9	–	7	.563	19	–	13	.594
Virginia Tech	7	–	9	.438	15	–	14	.517
Rutgers	7	–	9	.438	20	–	13	.606
West Virginia	7	–	9	.438	17	–	14	.548
Villanova	6	–	10	.375	18	–	17	.514
Georgetown	4	–	12	.250	13	–	15	.464
Miami (FL)*	4	–	12	.250	14	–	16	.467
St. John's*#	1	–	15	.063	2	–	21	.087
† 2004 Big East tournament winner As of April 5, 2004; Rankings from AP Poll; *Did not qualify for 2004 Big East tournament. #St. John's had 4 regular-season games vacated due to sanctions against the program; the school′s disputed record was 1–15, 6–21.

The 2003–04 Notre Dame Fighting Irish Men's Basketball Team represented the University of Notre Dame in the 2003–04 NCAA Division I men's basketball season. The team finished with an overall record of 19–13 (9–7 Big East). Notre Dame was invited to participate in the 2004 National Invitation Tournament. They would lose to Oregon in the quarterfinals 65–61.

== Roster ==
2003–04 Notre Dame Fighting Irish men's basketball team
Players
Coaches

Pos.	#	Name	Height	Weight	Year	Hometown
G	15	Colin Falls	6 ft 5 in (1.96 m)	200 lb (91 kg)	Fr	Park Ridge, Illinois
C	34	Torin Francis	6 ft 11 in (2.11 m)	252 lb (114 kg)	So	Boston, Massachusetts
G	2	Chris Quinn	6 ft 2 in (1.88 m)	178 lb (81 kg)	So	Dublin, Ohio
C	50	Tom Timmermans	6 ft 11 in (2.11 m)	253 lb (115 kg)	Sr	Driehuis, Netherlands

Head coach

- Mike Brey

Assistant coach(es)

- Anthony Solomon

Legend

- (C) Team captain
- (S) Suspended
- (I) Ineligible
- (W) Walk-on
- Injured
- Current redshirt

Roster

== Schedule ==
Date time, TV	Rank^{#}	Opponent^{#}	Result	Record	Site city, state
November 24*		Northern Illinois	W 74–65	1–0	Joyce Center; South Bend, IN
November 29*		Mount St. Mary's	W 78–64	2–0	Joyce Center; South Bend, IN
December 1*		at No. 24 Marquette	L 58–71	2–1	Bradley Center; Milwaukee, WI
December 6*		Central Michigan	L 68–69	2–2	Joyce Center; South Bend, IN
December 10*		Indiana	L 63–66	2–3	Joyce Center; South Bend, IN
December 14*		at DePaul	W 82–69	3–3	Allstate Arena (14,198); Rosemont, Illinois
December 21*		American	W 78–74	4–3	Joyce Center; South Bend, IN
December 23*		Quinnipiac	W 79–62	5–3	Joyce Center; South Bend, IN
December 28*		Morehead State	W 82–69	6–3	Joyce Center; South Bend, IN
January 7		West Virginia	W 63–52	7–3 (1–0)	Joyce Center; South Bend, IN
January 10		at Villanova	W 82–78	8–3 (2–0)	Wells Fargo Center; Philadelphia, Pennsylvania
January 12		at No. 13 Pittsburgh	L 71–74	8–4 (2–1)	Petersen Events Center; Pittsburgh, Pennsylvania
January 17		No. 17 Syracuse	L 70–81	9–4 (3–1)	Joyce Center; South Bend, IN
January 20		at Virginia Tech	W 74–63	10–4 (4–1)	Cassell Coliseum; Blacksburg, Virginia
January 25*		No. 9 Kentucky	L 63–71	10–5 (4–1)	Joyce Center; South Bend, IN
January 28		Miami (FL)	W 72–62	11–5 (5–1)	Joyce Center; South Bend, IN
January 31		at Rutgers	L 70–81	11–6 (5–2)	Louis Brown Athletic Center; Piscataway, NJ
February 4		at Boston College	L 69–76	11–7 (5–3)	Silvio O. Conte Forum; Boston, Massachusetts
February 7		No. 4 Pittsburgh	L 58–66	11–8 (5–4)	Joyce Center; South Bend, IN
February 9		No. 5 Connecticut	W 80–74	12–8 (6–4)	Joyce Center; South Bend, IN
February 14		Seton Hall	W 71–68	13–8 (7–4)	Joyce Center; South Bend, IN
February 16		at Syracuse	W 84–72	14–8 (8–4)	Carrier Dome; Syracuse, NY
February 21; 2:00 PM, CBS		at No. 8 Connecticut	L 50–61	14–9 (8–5)	Harry A. Gampel Pavilion; Storrs, Connecticut
February 24		No. 24 Providence	L 59–73	14–10 (8–6)	Joyce Center; South Bend, IN
February 28*		at UCLA	W 75–60	15–10 (8–6)	Pauley Pavilion; Los Angeles, CA
March 4		Georgetown	W 61–48	16–10 (9–6)	Joyce Center; South Bend, IN
March 6		at St. John’s	W 89–62	17–10 (10–6)	Madison Square Garden; New York, NY
Big East Tournament
March 10	(7)	vs. (10) West Virginia; First round	W 65–64	18–10 (10–6)	Madison Square Garden; New York, NY
March 11	(7)	vs. (2) No. 9 Connecticut; Quarterfinals	L 58–66	18–11 (10–6)	Madison Square Garden; New York, NY
NIT
March 17*		Purdue; First Round	W 71–59	19–11 (10–6)	Joyce Center; South Bend, IN
March 22*		St. Louis; Second Round	W 77–66	20–11 (10–6)	Joyce Center; South Bend, IN
March 25*		Oregon; Quarterfinals	L 61–65	20–12 (10–6)	Joyce Center; South Bend, IN
*Non-conference game. ^{#}Rankings from AP Poll. (#) Tournament seedings in parentheses.
