= Kevin Clark (basketball) =

American basketball player-coach

Current position
- Title: Assistant coach
- Team: Towson
- Conference: CAA

Biographical details
- Born: May 31, 1958 (age 68); Stamford, Connecticut, U.S.

Playing career
- 1977–1981: Clark

Coaching career (HC unless noted)
- 1982–1983: Holy Cross (asst.)
- 1984–1987: Clark (asst.)
- 1987–1991: Clark
- 1991–1994: Fairfield (asst.)
- 1994–1998: George Washington (asst.)
- 1998–2003: St. John's (asst.)
- 2003–2004: St. John's (interim)
- 2004–2011: Rhode Island (asst.)
- 2011–present: Towson (asst.)

Kevin Clark (born May 31, 1958) is an assistant men's basketball coach at Towson University. He is probably most well known for his stint as the interim head coach at St. John's during the 2003–2004 season.

Clark was hired by Mike Jarvis as an assistant at George Washington in 1994, and followed him to St. John's in 1998. In December 2003, Jarvis was fired after a 2-4 start, and Clark was named as his replacement for the rest of the season. Under Clark, the Red Storm were fairly competitive in their first eight Big East Conference games, despite losing each one.

However, the season came unraveled on February 4, after a loss to Pittsburgh. Six players broke curfew and went to a club in downtown Pittsburgh. They took a woman they met there back to the team hotel for sex. Ultimately, one player was expelled, another withdrew from school, another was suspended from school for at least one year, two others were kicked off the team for the rest of the season and another was suspended for two games. School officials did not hold Clark responsible for the incident.

After team captain Andre Stanley was declared academically ineligible, the Red Storm were cut down to only eight players, including four walk-ons. Ultimately, the Red Storm finished 6-21, including a 1-15 record in Big East play—the worst season in the program's history.
