= Ryan Gomes =

American basketball player (born 1982)

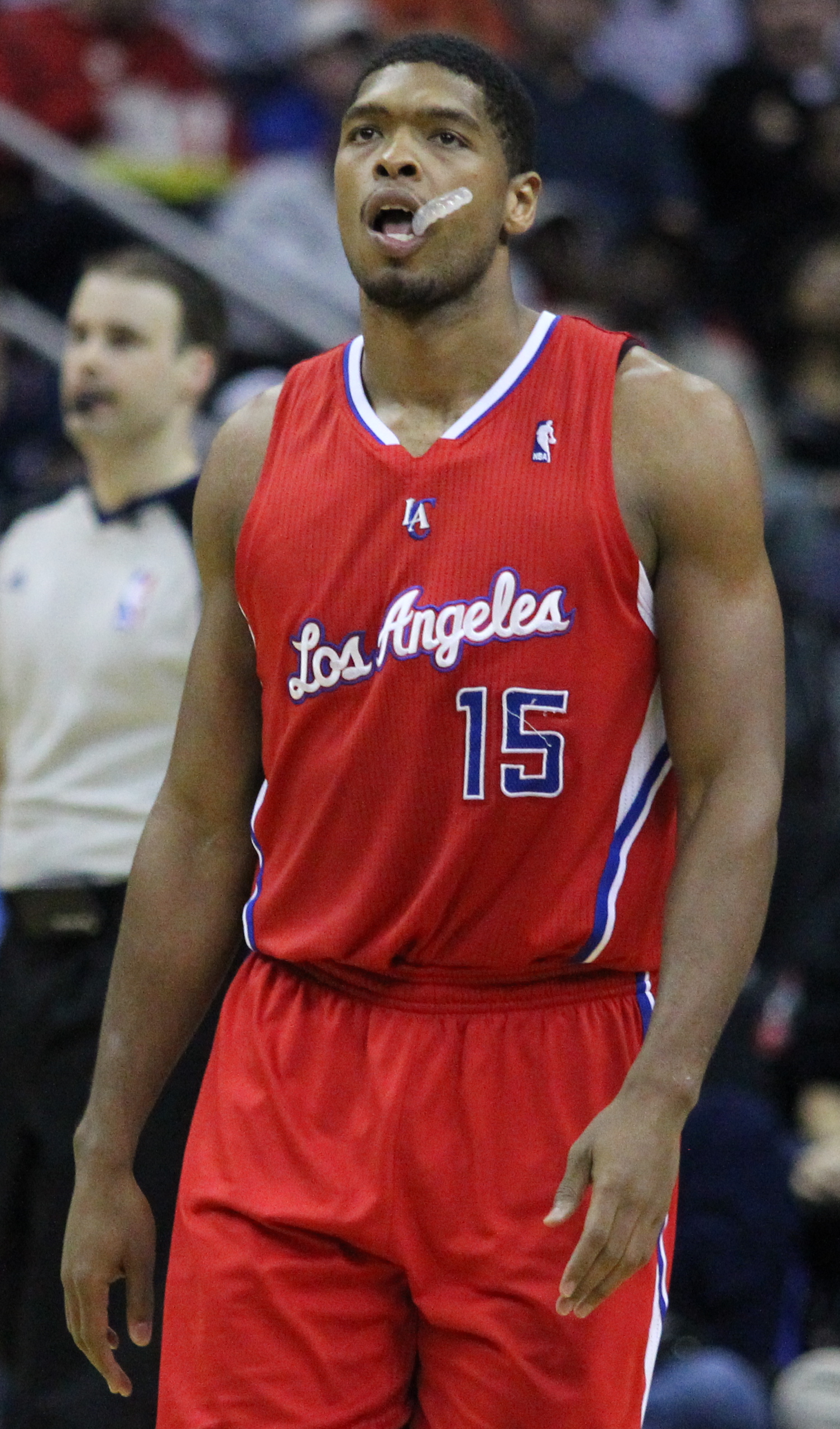
- Gomes with the Los Angeles Clippers in 2011

Personal information
- Born: September 1, 1982 (age 44) Waterbury, Connecticut, U.S.
- Listed height: 6 ft 7 in (2.01 m)
- Listed weight: 250 lb (113 kg)

Career information
- High school: Wilby (Waterbury, Connecticut)
- College: Providence (2001–2005)
- NBA draft: 2005: 2nd round, 50th overall pick
- Drafted by: Boston Celtics
- Playing career: 2005–2016
- Position: Small forward / power forward
- Number: 4, 8, 15, 33
- Coaching career: 2016–present

Career history

Playing
- 2005–2007: Boston Celtics
- 2007–2010: Minnesota Timberwolves
- 2010–2012: Los Angeles Clippers
- 2012–2013: Artland Dragons
- 2013–2014: Oklahoma City Thunder
- 2014: Laboral Kutxa
- 2016: Los Angeles D-Fenders

Coaching
- 2016–2017: Long Island Nets (assistant)
- 2021–2023: Team Overtime
- 2023–2025: Portland Trail Blazers (assistant)
- 2025–2026: Providence (assistant)

Career highlights
- NBA All-Rookie Second Team (2006); NBA D-League Impact Player of the Year (2016); All-NBA D-League Third Team (2016); Consensus first-team All-American (2004); 2× First-team All-Big East (2004, 2005)

Career statistics
- Points: 4,926 (10.1 ppg)
- Rebounds: 2,239 (4.6 rpg)
- Assists: 712 (1.5 apg)
- Stats at NBA.com
- Stats at Basketball Reference

Ryan Anthony Gomes (born September 1, 1982) is an American college basketball coach and former professional player who last served as an assistant coach for the Providence Friars. He was named a First Team All-American power forward at Providence College before being selected with the 50th overall pick in the 2005 NBA draft by the Boston Celtics.

== High school career ==
Gomes attended Wilby High School, where he was the captain of the basketball team during his final two seasons, averaging 26.9 points, 16 rebounds, 5.0 assists and 3.0 blocks per game. Gomes was awarded the Billy Finn Award as the top player in Waterbury, as well as being named Naugatuck Valley League MVP. During his high school days, Gomes also pitched on his baseball team where he recorded a .013 ERA. He received collegiate scholarship offers from Vanderbilt, Florida and LSU but ultimately chose to attend Providence College.

== College career ==
Gomes played his college career for Providence averaging 18.4 points, 8.9 rebounds, 2.3 assists and 1.6 steals in 35.1 minutes in his four years with the Friars. He had his best year as a junior, tallying 18.9 points, 9.4 rebounds, 2.3 assists and 1.6 steals per game which earned him a Consensus First Team All-American.

== Professional career ==
=== Boston Celtics (2005–2007) ===
==== 2005–06 season ====
Wearing number 4, Gomes was expected to play off the bench in his rookie season spelling Celtics star Paul Pierce. His playing time and statistical impact were limited early in the season. However, on January 26, 2006, the Celtics executed a multiplayer trade with the Minnesota Timberwolves that freed up roster space for Gomes to play. Soon after that, fellow Celtic Kendrick Perkins was injured and Gomes was inserted in the starting line-up.

After becoming a starter, Gomes excelled, and kept his job even after Perkins returned. On February 24, 2006, he collected 17 rebounds and scored 13 points in a win over the Portland Trail Blazers. Gomes scored at least 10 points in 21 of the 29 games he started in 2006, and in 7 of those games he also had a double-double. The second half of his rookie season was a definite success.

Gomes was named to NBA All-Rookie Second Team for the 2005–06 season, and chose to play in the Celtics' 2006 NBA summer-league team. Gomes was named to the summer league all-first team for the second consecutive year.

==== 2006–07 season ====
Gomes continued to make a significant impact starting 60 games for the Celtics in the 2006–07 season. Gomes averaged more than 30 minutes played, scoring 12.1 points per game, along with 1.6 assists and 5.6 rebounds. On November 8, 2006, Gomes recorded his first career triple-double collecting 10 points, 12 rebounds, and a career-high 10 assists against the Charlotte Bobcats in the Celtics' first win of the 2006–07 season after an 0–3 start. On January 20, Gomes scored a career-high 31 points in a January 20, 2007 overtime loss to the Washington Wizards. Coming off the bench on March 4, Gomes tied his career-high of 17 rebounds and scored 21 points while playing a total of 52 minutes in a double overtime victory against the Minnesota Timberwolves.

On March 7, Gomes sprained his left foot and did not play in the second half of the game against the Houston Rockets. He sat out the following 7 games, and returned to the Celtics' roster playing limited minutes beginning on March 21. Near the end of the season, Gomes began regularly shooting three-point shots, making 14 of 34 in April, after shooting only 5 for 17 in his career to that point.

Gomes attracted the attention of the national media for comments he made following a Celtics' loss to the Milwaukee Bucks on April 13. Neither Gomes nor starting point guard Rajon Rondo played in the game's final, decisive minutes. After, Gomes said, "I probably (would have played), but since we were in the hunt for a high draft pick, of course things are different." This was the first public comment by a Celtic in 2007 implying that the team was losing games purposely, to improve their status for the 2007 NBA draft.

=== Minnesota Timberwolves (2007–2010) ===
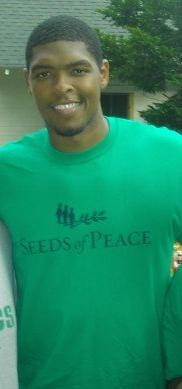
Gomes visiting Seeds of Peace in July 2007

On July 31, 2007, Gomes was traded along with Gerald Green, Al Jefferson, Theo Ratliff, Sebastian Telfair, and draft picks, to the Minnesota Timberwolves for Kevin Garnett. On January 21, 2008, Gomes scored a career high 35 points against the Golden State Warriors in a 109–108 win. Gomes played in all 82 Timberwolves games in 2007–08, starting 74 of them, and he averaged 12.6 points, 5.8 rebounds, and 1.8 assists per game.

Gomes also played in all 82 games in the 2008–09 season in which he set a career high in points scored per game (13.3).

On June 24, 2010, Gomes was traded to the Portland Trail Blazers with the draft rights to Luke Babbitt for Martell Webster. Gomes was waived by Portland on June 29, 2010.

=== Los Angeles Clippers (2010–2012) ===
On July 8, 2010, Gomes was signed by the Clippers. He was waived by the team on July 17, 2012, via the amnesty clause.

=== Artland Dragons (2012–2013) ===
On November 22, 2012, Gomes signed with the Artland Dragons of Germany's Basketball Bundesliga.

=== Oklahoma City Thunder (2013–2014) ===
On August 7, 2013, Gomes signed with the Oklahoma City Thunder.

On January 7, 2014, a three-team trade was completed between the Thunder, the Boston Celtics, and the Memphis Grizzlies. Oklahoma City traded Gomes to Boston in exchange for second round draft picks in 2014 and 2017 from the Grizzlies; he was subsequently waived by the Celtics. As part of the transaction, the Grizzlies also traded Jerryd Bayless to the Celtics in exchange for Courtney Lee.

=== Laboral Kutxa (2014) ===
On September 11, 2014, Gomes signed with Laboral Kutxa of Spain. On October 27, 2014, he parted ways with Laboral Kutxa, after playing only one game in the ACB League.

=== Los Angeles D-Fenders (2016) ===
On January 7, 2016, Gomes was acquired by the Los Angeles D-Fenders of the NBA Development League. Over the course of the 2015–16 season, he scored in double figures 28 times, including two 30-plus-point outings, and recorded nine double-doubles. He subsequently earned NBA D-League Impact Player of the Year and led the D-Fenders to the D-League Finals where they were defeated 2–1 by the Sioux Falls Skyforce. In 40 games for the D-Fenders, he averaged 18.7 points, 8.2 rebounds and 2.9 assists per game. At the season's end, he was named to the All-NBA D-League Third Team.

== Coaching career ==
On August 23, 2016, Gomes was appointed an assistant coach of the Long Island Nets, a new NBA Development League franchise.

In August 2021, Gomes was named the head coach of Team Overtime, a team that competes in the prep basketball league Overtime Elite (OTE).

In 2023, Gomes joined the Portland Trail Blazers as an assistant coach. On April 30, 2025, Gomes and the Trail Blazers parted ways.

On June 3, 2025, Gomes returned to his alma mater, becoming an assistant coach for the Providence Friars.

== NBA career statistics ==
Legend
GP	Games played	GS	Games started	MPG	Minutes per game
FG%	Field goal percentage	3P%	3-point field goal percentage	FT%	Free throw percentage
RPG	Rebounds per game	APG	Assists per game	SPG	Steals per game
BPG	Blocks per game	PPG	Points per game	**Bold**	Career high
*	Led the league

=== Regular season ===
Year	Team	GP	GS	MPG	FG%	3P%	FT%	RPG	APG	SPG	BPG	PPG
2005–06	Boston	61	33	22.6	**.487**	.333	.752	4.9	1.0	.6	.1	7.6
2006–07	Boston	73	60	31.2	.467	**.381**	.811	5.6	1.6	.7	.2	12.1
2007–08	Minnesota	**82***	74	29.7	.457	.330	**.830**	**5.8**	**1.8**	**.8**	.1	12.6
2008–09	Minnesota	**82***	**76**	**31.9**	.431	.372	.807	4.8	1.6	**.8**	**.3**	**13.3**
2009–10	Minnesota	76	64	29.1	.447	.372	.825	4.6	1.6	**.8**	.2	10.9
2010–11	L.A. Clippers	76	62	27.6	.410	.341	.718	3.3	1.6	**.8**	.2	7.2
2011–12	L.A. Clippers	32	2	13.3	.326	.138	.727	1.9	.4	.5	.0	2.3
2013–14	Oklahoma City	5	0	6.8	.375	.000	.000	.8	.2	.0	.0	1.2
Career		482	371	27.9	.445	.349	.799	4.6	1.5	.7	.2	10.1

== See also ==
- List of NCAA Division I men's basketball players with 2,000 points and 1,000 rebounds
