= Chris Taft =

American basketball player (born 1985)

Personal information
- Born: March 10, 1985 (age 41) Brooklyn, New York, U.S.
- Listed height: 6 ft 10 in (2.08 m)
- Listed weight: 261 lb (118 kg)

Career information
- High school: Xaverian (Brooklyn, New York)
- College: Pittsburgh (2003–2005)
- NBA draft: 2005: 2nd round, 42nd overall pick
- Drafted by: Golden State Warriors
- Playing career: 2005–2012
- Position: Center
- Number: 21, 23

Career history
- 2005–2006: Golden State Warriors
- 2008: Rio Grande Valley Vipers
- 2012: Korihait

Career highlights
- Third-team All-Big East (2004); Big East Rookie of the Year (2004); Third-team Parade All-American (2003)
- Stats at NBA.com
- Stats at Basketball Reference

Chris Taft (born March 10, 1985) is an American former basketball player who played briefly in the National Basketball Association (NBA). He played college basketball for the Pittsburgh Panthers.

== College career ==
Chris Taft was born in Brooklyn, New York, and began his college career at the University of Pittsburgh after graduating from Xaverian High School in Brooklyn. Taft won the Big East Conference Rookie of the Year Award in his Freshman season and set the all-time Pittsburgh season record for field goals made as a freshman (162). Taft also earned Third Team All Big East Honors as a Freshman.

In 2004–05, Taft averaged 26.5 minutes per game, 13.3 points per game, 7.5 rebounds per game, and 1.7 blocks per game, and shot 58.5% from the field. After Pittsburgh suffered a loss to the University of the Pacific in the first round of the NCAA Tournament, Taft announced his entry into the 2005 NBA draft. Shortly after announcing his departure from Pittsburgh, Taft hired an agent and indefinitely lost his NCAA eligibility. Taft went to the Chicago Annual Predraft Camp which began his post-college career.

== Professional career ==
Chris Taft entered the NBA draft as a projected first rounder, but he fell into the second round. Ultimately, he was picked by the Golden State Warriors 42nd overall, with the pick they got from the New Jersey Nets in exchange for Clifford Robinson.

Taft played in only 17 games in his rookie season as a result of back spasms that ended his season in early January. He had surgery in 2006 to repair a herniated disc and has yet to return to the court in a professional game. In his limited playing time, Chris averaged 2.8 points and 2.1 rebounds in 8.5 minutes per game.

His two major career games consist of Golden State's game against the Chicago Bulls on November 9, 2005, where Taft scored 7 points in 19 minutes, and Golden State's game against the Atlanta Hawks on November 2, where he had another professional career high of three blocks.

Taft was unable to play during the 2006–07 NBA preseason due to recurring back spasms and inflammation. On October 27, 2006, he was waived by the Warriors and became a free agent.

In November 2011, Taft was selected by the Springfield Armor in the fourth round of the NBA D-League Draft.

In August 2012, Chris Taft signed a contract to play in Finland with Korihait. In December Korihait released Taft due to health reasons.
