= Craig Smith (basketball, born 1983) =

American basketball player (born 1983)

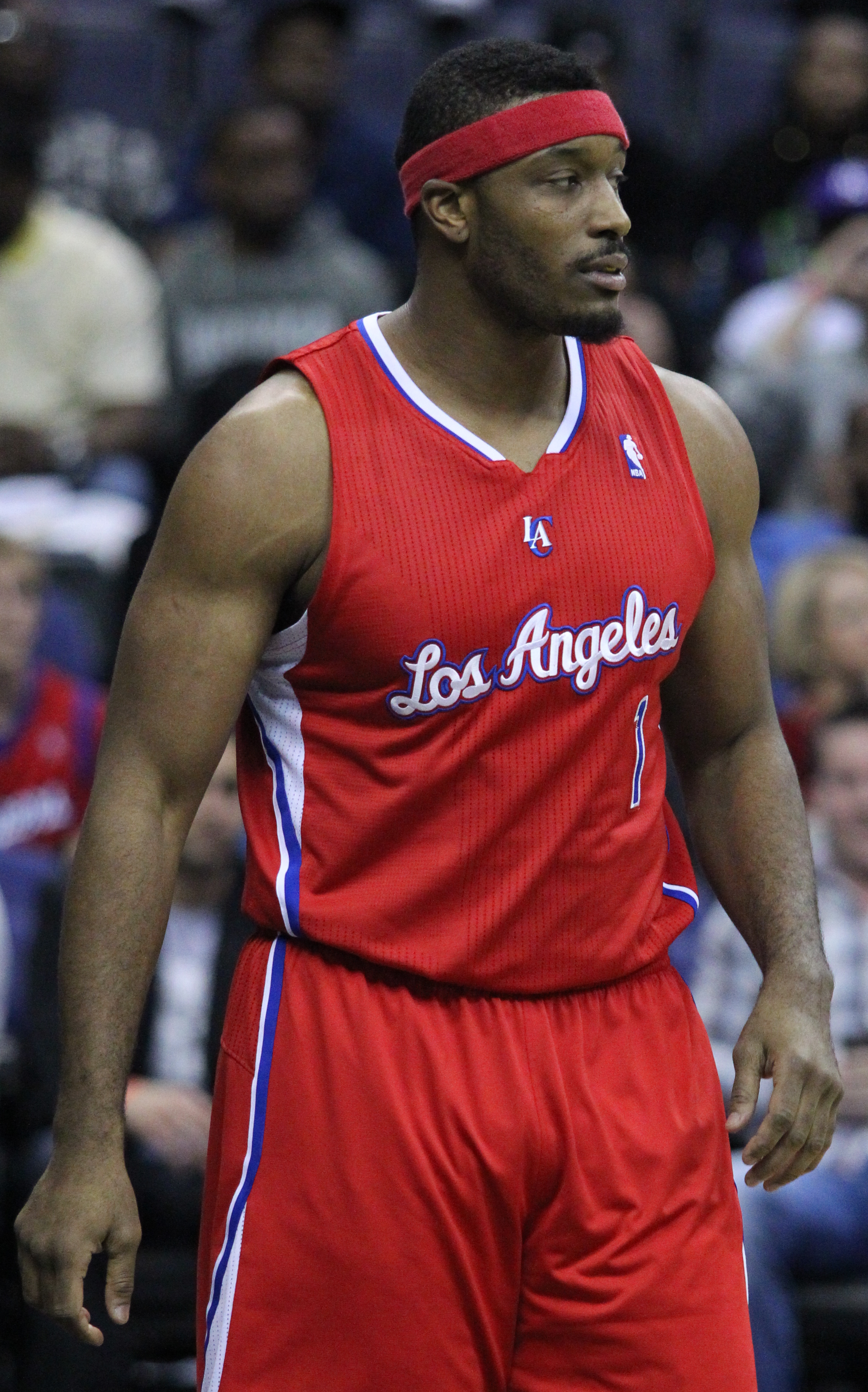

Personal information
- Born: November 10, 1983 (age 43) Inglewood, California, U.S.
- Listed height: 6 ft 7 in (2.01 m)
- Listed weight: 250 lb (113 kg)

Career information
- High school: Fairfax (Los Angeles, California); Worcester Academy (Worcester, Massachusetts)
- College: Boston College (2002–2006)
- NBA draft: 2006: 2nd round, 36th overall pick
- Drafted by: Minnesota Timberwolves
- Playing career: 2006–2015
- Position: Power forward
- Number: 5, 1, 83

Career history
- 2006–2009: Minnesota Timberwolves
- 2009–2011: Los Angeles Clippers
- 2011–2012: Portland Trail Blazers
- 2012–2013: Hapoel Jerusalem
- 2013: Hong Kong Bulls
- 2014: Sioux Falls Skyforce
- 2014–2015: Ironi Nes Ziona

Career highlights
- NBL China scoring champion (2013); NBA All-Rookie Second Team (2007); Second-team All-American – NABC (2006); Third-team All-American – AP (2006); Third-team All-American – NABC (2005); First-team All-ACC (2006); 2× First-team All-Big East (2004, 2005); Big East All-Rookie Team (2003)
- Stats at NBA.com
- Stats at Basketball Reference
Medals
Men's basketball
Representing United States
Summer Universiade
Gold medal – first place	2005 Izmir	National team

Craig Smith (born November 10, 1983) is an American former professional basketball player. After playing at Boston College from 2002 to 2006, he was selected by the Minnesota Timberwolves in the 2006 NBA draft.

== High school and college ==
Smith attended Worcester Academy, a preparatory school in Worcester, Massachusetts, for a year as a postgraduate student before college. He went on to score 2,349 points in his collegiate career, placing him second on Boston College's career scoring list (behind Troy Bell). In his senior season, he had per-game averages of 17.6 points, 9.4 rebounds, 3.0 assists, 1.2 steals, and 0.8 blocked shots.

== Professional career ==
Smith was selected by the Minnesota Timberwolves with the 36th overall pick in the 2006 NBA draft. On August 30, 2006, he signed a multi-year deal with the Timberwolves.

Smith averaged 7.4 points and 5.1 rebounds in his rookie year (2006–07) with the Timberwolves. While with the Timberwolves, he earned the nickname "The Rhino" from head coach Kevin McHale for his powerful, charging style of play. He earned a starting role for the last five games of the season and averaged 12.0 points and 10.2 rebounds while logging an average 34.4 minutes. He had an increased role in the 2007–08 season after a strong rookie performance and a Vegas Summer League performance during which he averaged 21.8 points and 6.0 rebounds. With this performance, Smith earned a spot on the Summer League All-Tournament First Team. On December 11, 2007, Smith scored 36 points in an 88–102 loss to the Washington Wizards, logging 38 minutes and making 14 of his 22 field goal attempts. On July 17, 2008, he re-signed with the Timberwolves on a multi-year deal.

On July 20, 2009, Smith was traded, along with Mark Madsen and Sebastian Telfair, to the Los Angeles Clippers for Quentin Richardson. On July 19, 2010, Smith re-signed with the Clippers on a one-year deal.

On December 15, 2011, Smith signed with the Portland Trail Blazers.

On August 11, 2012, Smith signed with Hapoel Jerusalem of Israel for the 2012–13 season. On March 15, 2013, he was released by Hapoel. He later joined the Hong Kong Bulls for the 2013 NBL season.

On March 14, 2014, Smith was acquired by the Sioux Falls Skyforce of the NBA D-League.

On September 23, 2014, Smith signed with Israeli club Ironi Nes Ziona for the 2014–15 season.

In 2019 Craig Smith signed with the Enemies of the Big3. Entering his first season with the BIG3, Craig Smith was selected with the 10th pick in the second round of the 2019 BIG3 draft.

== The Basketball Tournament ==
Craig Smith played for Team CitiTeam Blazers in the 2018 edition of The Basketball Tournament. CitiTeam Blazers made it to the Second Round before falling to Team Challenge ALS.

== NBA career statistics ==
Legend
GP	Games played	GS	Games started	MPG	Minutes per game
FG%	Field goal percentage	3P%	3-point field goal percentage	FT%	Free throw percentage
RPG	Rebounds per game	APG	Assists per game	SPG	Steals per game
BPG	Blocks per game	PPG	Points per game	**Bold**	Career high
*	Led the league

=== Regular season ===
Year	Team	GP	GS	MPG	FG%	3P%	FT%	RPG	APG	SPG	BPG	PPG
2006–07	Minnesota	**82***	5	18.7	.531	.000	.624	**5.1**	.6	**.6**	.2	7.4
2007–08	Minnesota	77	11	**20.1**	.563	.000	.665	4.6	.8	.5	.2	9.4
2008–09	Minnesota	74	**31**	19.7	.562	.000	.677	3.8	**1.1**	.4	**.3**	**10.1**
2009–10	L.A. Clippers	75	2	16.4	**.569**	**.200**	.635	3.8	**1.1**	.4	**.3**	7.8
2010–11	L.A. Clippers	48	0	12.2	.553	.000	**.735**	2.4	.6	.3	.1	5.4
2011–12	Portland	47	0	9.9	.504	.000	.717	2.3	.4	.3	.1	3.3
Career		403	49	16.9	.553	.037	.661	3.9	.8	.5	.2	7.6

== See also ==
- List of NCAA Division I men's basketball players with 2,000 points and 1,000 rebounds
