= 2003–04 Air Force Falcons men's basketball team =

American college basketball season

2003–04 Air Force Falcons men's basketball

Mountain West regular season champions

NCAA tournament, first round
- Conference: Mountain West Conference
- Record: 22–7 (12–2 MWC)
- Head coach: Joe Scott (4th season)
- Home arena: Clune Arena

2003–04 Mountain West Conference men's basketball standings
	Conf.				Overall
Team	W		L	PCT	W		L	PCT
Air Force	12	–	2	.857	22	–	7	.759
BYU	10	–	4	.714	21	–	9	.700
Utah †	9	–	5	.643	24	–	9	.727
UNLV	7	–	7	.500	18	–	13	.581
New Mexico	5	–	9	.357	14	–	14	.500
San Diego State	5	–	9	.357	14	–	16	.467
Wyoming	4	–	10	.286	11	–	17	.393
Colorado State	4	–	10	.286	13	–	16	.448
† 2004 Mountain West tournament winner Rankings from AP Poll

The 2003–04 Air Force Falcons men's basketball team represented the United States Air Force Academy as a member of the Mountain West Conference during the 2003–04 NCAA Division I men's basketball season. Led by 4th-year head coach Joe Scott, they played their home games at Clune Arena on the Air Force Academy's main campus in Colorado Springs, Colorado.

Air Force finished with a 12–2 record in the Mountain West and a 22–7 overall record. They won the Mountain West regular season title, but lost in the quarterfinals of the conference tournament to Colorado State. The Falcons also made their first appearance in the NCAA tournament in 42 seasons, receiving an at-large bid to the 2004 NCAA Division I men's basketball tournament as the 11-seed in the South region where they lost to 6-seed North Carolina in the opening round.

== Roster ==
2003–04 Air Force Falcons men's basketball team
Players
Coaches

Pos.	#	Name	Height	Weight	Year	Hometown
G	11	Tim Keller	6 ft 3 in (1.91 m)	185 lb (84 kg)	Jr	Austin, Texas
C	45	Nick Welch	6 ft 8 in (2.03 m)	210 lb (95 kg)	So	Fort Worth, Texas

Head coach

- Joe Scott

Assistant coach(es)

Legend

- (C) Team captain
- (S) Suspended
- (I) Ineligible
- (W) Walk-on
- Injured
- Current redshirt

== Schedule and results ==
Date time, TV	Rank^{#}	Opponent^{#}	Result	Record	Site (attendance) city, state
Regular season
Nov 22, 2003*		Arkansas-Pine Bluff	W 63–40	1–0	Clune Arena; Colorado Springs, Colorado
Nov 28, 2003*		at Navy	W 86–46	2–0	Alumni Hall; Annapolis, Maryland
Nov 30, 2003*		at Belmont	L 38–46	2–1	Curb Event Center; Nashville, Tennessee
Dec 7, 2003*		at Auburn	L 49–68	2–2	Beard–Eaves–Memorial Coliseum; Auburn, Alabama
Dec 9, 2003*		at Texas A&M	W 56–53	3–2	Reed Arena; College Station, Texas
Dec 20, 2003*		Charleston Southern	W 67–46	4–2	Clune Arena; Colorado Springs, Colorado
Dec 27, 2003*		vs. Prairie View	W 59–46	5–2	Haas Pavilion; Berkeley, California
Dec 28, 2003*		at California	W 49–44	6–2	Haas Pavilion; Berkeley, California
Jan 2, 2004*		Milwaukee	W 71–49	7–2	Clune Arena; Colorado Springs, Colorado
Jan 6, 2004*		Savannah State	W 72–35	8–2	Clune Arena; Colorado Springs, Colorado
Jan 9, 2004*		Purdue-Fort Wayne	W 64–44	9–2	Clune Arena; Colorado Springs, Colorado
Jan 12, 2004		at Colorado State	W 65–57	10–2 (1–0)	Moby Arena; Fort Collins, Colorado
Jan 17, 2004		at New Mexico	W 68–42	11–2 (2–0)	University Arena; Albuquerque, New Mexico
Jan 21, 2004*		Texas A&M	W 61–37	12–2	Clune Arena; Colorado Springs, Colorado
Jan 24, 2004		BYU	W 74–52	13–2 (3–0)	Clune Arena; Colorado Springs, Colorado
Jan 26, 2004*		Utah	W 62–49	14–2 (4–0)	Clune Arena; Colorado Springs, Colorado
Jan 31, 2004		at San Diego State	W 57–43	15–2 (5–0)	Cox Arena; San Diego, California
Feb 2, 2004		at UNLV	L 50–63	15–3 (5–1)	Thomas & Mack Center; Las Vegas, Nevada
Feb 7, 2004		Wyoming	W 83–71	16–3 (6–1)	Clune Arena; Colorado Springs, Colorado
Feb 9, 2004		Colorado State	W 52–44	17–3 (7–1)	Clune Arena; Colorado Springs, Colorado
Feb 14, 2004		New Mexico	W 51–50	18–3 (8–1)	Clune Arena; Colorado Springs, Colorado
Feb 16, 2004*		at Texas-Rio Grande Valley	L 35–37	18–4	UTPA Fieldhouse; Edinburg, Texas
Feb 21, 2004		at Utah	W 59–57	19–4 (9–1)	Jon M. Huntsman Center; Salt Lake City, Utah
Feb 23, 2004		at BYU	L 61–67	19–5 (9–2)	Marriott Center; Provo, Utah
Feb 28, 2004		UNLV	W 72–70	20–5 (10–2)	Clune Arena; Colorado Springs, Colorado
Mar 1, 2004		San Diego State	W 61–49	21–5 (11–2)	Clune Arena; Colorado Springs, Colorado
Mar 6, 2004		at Wyoming	W 52–47	22–5 (12–2)	Arena-Auditorium; Laramie, Wyoming
MWC tournament
Mar 11, 2004*	No. 25	vs. Colorado State; Quarterfinals	L 48–60	22–6	The Pepsi Center; Denver, Colorado
NCAA Tournament
Mar 18, 2004*	(11 S)	vs. (6 S) No. 18 North Carolina; First round	L 52–63	22–7	The Pepsi Center; Denver, Colorado
*Non-conference game. ^{#}Rankings from AP Poll/Coaches' Poll. (#) Tournament seedings in parentheses. S=South. All times are in Mountain Time.

== Awards and honors ==
- Nick Welch – MWC co-Player of the Year, AP Honorable Mention All-American
- Joe Scott – MWC Coach of the Year
