= 2005–06 Air Force Falcons men's basketball team =

American college basketball season

2005–06 Air Force Falcons men's basketball

NCAA tournament, first round
- Conference: Mountain West Conference
- Record: 24–7 (12–4 MWC)
- Head coach: Jeff Bzdelik (1st season)
- Home arena: Clune Arena

2005–06 Mountain West Conference men's basketball standings
	Conf.				Overall
Team	W		L	PCT	W		L	PCT
San Diego State †	13	–	3	.813	24	–	9	.727
Air Force	12	–	4	.750	24	–	7	.774
BYU	12	–	4	.750	20	–	9	.690
UNLV	10	–	6	.625	17	–	13	.567
New Mexico	8	–	8	.500	17	–	13	.567
Utah	6	–	10	.375	14	–	15	.483
Wyoming	5	–	11	.313	14	–	18	.438
Colorado State	4	–	12	.250	16	–	15	.516
TCU	4	–	12	.250	16	–	15	.516
† 2006 Mountain West tournament winner Rankings from AP Poll

The 2005–06 Air Force Falcons men's basketball team represented the United States Air Force Academy as a member of the Mountain West Conference during the 2003–04 NCAA Division I men's basketball season. Led by first-year head coach Jeff Bzdelik, they played their home games at Clune Arena on the Air Force Academy's main campus in Colorado Springs, Colorado.

Air Force finished second in the MWC regular season standings with a conference record of 12–4 and an overall record of 24–7, returning to the NCAA tournament for the second time in three seasons. The Falcons received an at-large bid to the 2006 NCAA Division I men's basketball tournament as the 13-seed in the Washington, D.C. region where they lost to 4-seed Illinois in the opening round.

== Roster ==
2005–06 Air Force Falcons men's basketball team
Players
Coaches

Pos.	#	Name	Height	Weight	Year	Hometown
G	15	Antoine Hood	6 ft 5 in (1.96 m)	200 lb (91 kg)	Sr
C	45	Nick Welch (injured)	6 ft 8 in (2.03 m)	210 lb (95 kg)	Sr	Fort Worth, Texas

Head coach

- Jeff Bzdelik

Assistant coach(es)

Legend

- (C) Team captain
- (S) Suspended
- (I) Ineligible
- (W) Walk-on
- Injured
- Current redshirt

== Schedule and results ==
Date time, TV	Rank^{#}	Opponent^{#}	Result	Record	Site (attendance) city, state
Regular season
Nov 13, 2005*		vs. Northern Arizona	W 62–49	1–0	Bank of America Arena; Seattle, Washington
Nov 14, 2005*		vs. Miami (FL)	W 57–53	2–0	Bank of America Arena; Seattle, Washington
Nov 15, 2005*		at Washington	L 74–85	2–1	Bank of America Arena; Seattle, Washington
Mar 4, 2006		at Colorado State	W 63–59	24–5 (12–4)	Moby Arena; Fort Collins, Colorado
MWC tournament
Mar 9, 2006*		vs. Wyoming; Quarterfinals	L 55–57	24–6	The Pepsi Center; Denver, Colorado
NCAA Tournament
Mar 16, 2006*	(13 DC)	vs. (4 DC) No. 13 Illinois; First round	L 69–78	24–7	Cox Arena (9,891); San Diego, California
*Non-conference game. ^{#}Rankings from AP Poll/Coaches' Poll. (#) Tournament seedings in parentheses. DC=Washington, D.C.. All times are in Mountain Time.
