= 2005–06 San Diego State Aztecs men's basketball team =

American college basketball season

2005–06 San Diego State Aztecs men's basketball
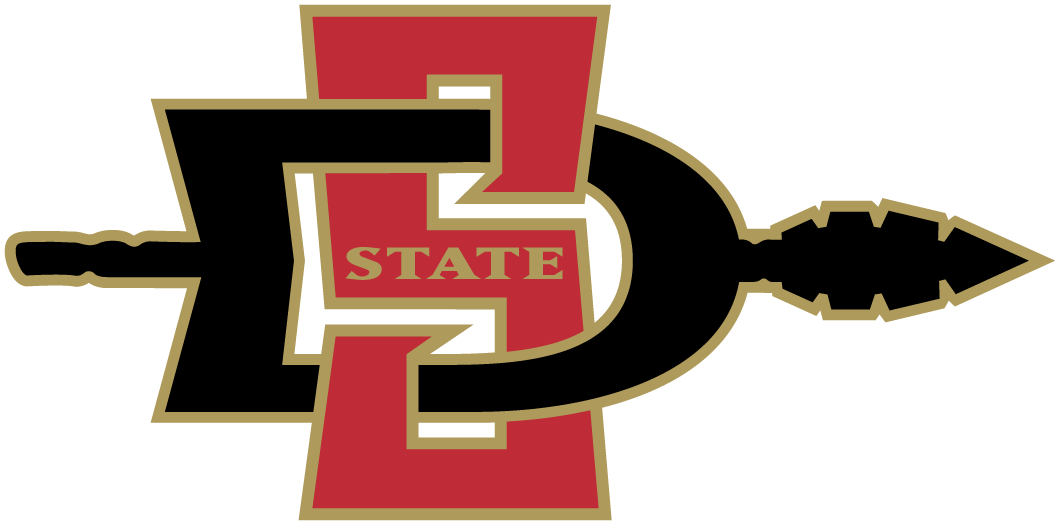

Mountain West regular season champions Mountain West tournament champions

NCAA tournament
- Conference: Mountain West Conference
- Record: 24–9 (13–3 Mountain West)
- Head coach: Steve Fisher (7th season)
- Assistant coach: Brian Dutcher
- Home arena: Viejas Arena

2005–06 Mountain West Conference men's basketball standings
	Conf.				Overall
Team	W		L	PCT	W		L	PCT
San Diego State †	13	–	3	.813	24	–	9	.727
Air Force	12	–	4	.750	24	–	7	.774
BYU	12	–	4	.750	20	–	9	.690
UNLV	10	–	6	.625	17	–	13	.567
New Mexico	8	–	8	.500	17	–	13	.567
Utah	6	–	10	.375	14	–	15	.483
Wyoming	5	–	11	.313	14	–	18	.438
Colorado State	4	–	12	.250	16	–	15	.516
TCU	4	–	12	.250	16	–	15	.516
† 2006 Mountain West tournament winner Rankings from AP Poll

The 2005–06 San Diego State men's basketball team represented San Diego State University in the 2005–06 college basketball season. This was head coach Steve Fisher's seventh season at San Diego State. The Aztecs competed in the Mountain West Conference and played their home games at Viejas Arena.

== Roster ==
2005–06 San Diego State Aztecs men's basketball team
Players
Coaches

Pos.	#	Name	Height	Weight	Year	Hometown
G	1	Brandon Heath	6 ft 4 in (1.93 m)	195 lb (88 kg)	Jr	Los Angeles, California
G	3	Richie Williams	5 ft 9 in (1.75 m)	160 lb (73 kg)	Fr	San Diego, California
F	42	Marcus Slaughter	6 ft 9 in (2.06 m)	220 lb (100 kg)	Jr	Riverside, California

Head coach

- Steve Fisher

Assistant coach(es)

Brian Dutcher (Minnesota)

Legend

- (C) Team captain
- (S) Suspended
- (I) Ineligible
- (W) Walk-on
- Injured
- Current redshirt

== Schedule and results ==
- All times are Pacific

Date time, TV	Rank^{#}	Opponent^{#}	Result	Record	Site (attendance) city, state
Regular Season
Nov 17, 2005*		at Alaska-Fairbanks	W 67–55	1–0	Carlson Center; Fairbanks, Alaska
Nov 19, 2005*		vs. Illinois-Chicago	L 63–66	1–1	Carlson Center; Fairbanks, Alaska
Nov 20, 2005*		vs. Southern Miss	W 79–51	2–1	Carlson Center; Fairbanks, Alaska
Nov 26, 2005*		Albany (NY)	W 80–53	3–1	Cox Arena; San Diego, California
Nov 30, 2005*		at San Diego	L 80–90	3–2	Jenny Craig Pavilion; San Diego, California
Dec 3, 2005*		Point Loma Nazarene	W 88–77	4–2	Cox Arena; San Diego, California
Dec 6, 2005*		at California	L 64–82	4–3	Haas Pavilion; Berkeley, California
Dec 10, 2005*		Washington State	L 49–60	4–4	Cox Arena; San Diego, California
Dec 17, 2005*		UC Santa Barbara	W 66–54	5–4	Cox Arena; San Diego, California
Dec 20, 2005*		UMBC	W 58–45	6–4	Cox Arena; San Diego, California
Dec 27, 2005*		at Providence	L 65–80	6–5	Dunkin Donuts Center; Providence, Rhode Island
Dec 31, 2005*		Loyola Marymount	W 84–68	7–5	Cox Arena; San Diego, California
Jan 4, 2006		Colorado State	W 83–75	8–5 (1–0)	Cox Arena; San Diego, California
Jan 7, 2006		at Air Force	L 62–65	8–6 (1–1)	Clune Arena; Colorado Springs, Colorado
Jan 11, 2006		at Utah	W 72–67	9–6 (2–1)	Jon M. Huntsman Center; Salt Lake City, Utah
Jan 14, 2006		UNLV	W 83–67	10–6 (3–1)	Cox Arena; San Diego, California
Jan 18, 2006		at TCU	W 76–57	11–6 (4–1)	Daniel-Meyer Coliseum; Fort Worth, Texas
Jan 21, 2006		BYU	W 88–61	12–6 (5–1)	Cox Arena; San Diego, California
Jan 25, 2006		New Mexico	W 75–69	13–6 (6–1)	Cox Arena; San Diego, California
Jan 28, 2006		at Wyoming	W 78–77 ^{OT}	14–6 (7–1)	Arena-Auditorium; Laramie, Wyoming
Mar 1, 2006		Wyoming	W 91–72	20–8 (13–3)	Cox Arena; San Diego, California
Mar 3, 2006*		South Dakota State	W 88–63	21–8	Cox Arena; San Diego, California
Mountain West tournament
Mar 9, 2006*		vs. Colorado State; Quarterfinals	W 64–52	22–8	The Pepsi Center; Denver, Colorado
Mar 10, 2006*		vs. UNLV; Semifinals	W 63–60	23–8	The Pepsi Center; Denver, Colorado
Mar 11, 2006*		vs. Wyoming; Championship game	W 69–64 ^{OT}	24–8	The Pepsi Center; Denver, Colorado
NCAA tournament
Mar 16, 2006*; CBS	(11 W)	vs. (6 W) Indiana; First round	L 83–87	24–9	Jon M. Huntsman Center (15,122); Salt Lake City, Utah
*Non-conference game. ^{#}Rankings from AP Poll. (#) Tournament seedings in parentheses.

== Awards and honors ==
- Brandon Heath – Mountain West Player of the Year
