= Kerry Rupp =

American college basketball coach (born 1954)

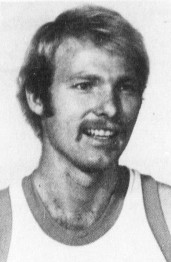
- Rupp in 1976

Current position
- Title: Assistant coach
- Team: Green Bay Phoenix
- Conference: Horizon League

Biographical details
- Born: February 24, 1954 (age 72); Magna, Utah, U.S.

Playing career
- 1972–1974: Utah State
- 1974–1977: Southern Utah

Coaching career (HC unless noted)
- 1978–1979: Uintah HS
- 1979–1982: Murray HS
- 1982–1986: East HS (football asst.)
- 1986–1990: East HS (asst.)
- 1990–2000: East HS
- 2000–2004: Utah (asst.)
- 2004: Utah
- 2004–2006: Indiana (asst.)
- 2006–2007: UAB (asst.)
- 2007–2011: Louisiana Tech
- 2011–2012: Hawaii (DBO)
- 2012–2014: Montana (asst.)
- 2014–2022: Oregon State (associate HC)
- 2022–2024: Detroit Mercy (asst.)
- 2025–present: Green Bay (asst.)

Head coaching record
- Overall: 66–77 (NCAA)

Accomplishments and honors

Championships
- MWC tournament (2004)

Awards
- UHSAA Utah Coach of the Year (1999); LSWA Louisiana Coach of the Year (2010)

Kerry Lee Rupp (born February 24, 1954) is an American college basketball coach who is currently an assistant coach with Green Bay Phoenix, serving as the offensive coordinator.

Rupp's previous stints as an assistant coach include Detroit Mercy, Montana, UAB, Indiana, and Utah. Rupp served as head coach at Utah (interim) in 2004 and at Louisiana Tech from 2007 to 2011. From 2014 to 2022, he served as associate head coach at Oregon State.

On February 20, 2026, Rupp served as the acting head coach in Green Bay's 73-68 win at Oakland while Doug Gottlieb served a one-game suspension by the Horizon League.

Rupp graduated from Cyprus High School of Magna, Utah in 1972 and earned his B.A. in physical education from Southern Utah University in 1977.

== Head coaching record ==
Record table
Season	Team	Overall	Conference	Standing	Postseason
Utah Utes (Mountain West Conference) (2004)
2003–04	Utah	9–4	6–3	3rd	NCAA Division I First Round
Utah:		9–4	6–3		
Louisiana Tech Bulldogs (Western Athletic Conference) (2007–2011)
2007–08	Louisiana Tech	6–24	3–13	9th	
2008–09	Louisiana Tech	15–18	6–10	T–6th	
2009–10	Louisiana Tech	24–11	9–7	4th	CIT Second Round
2010–11	Louisiana Tech	12–20	2–14	9th	
Louisiana Tech:		57–73	20–44		
Total:		66–77			
National champion Postseason invitational champion Conference regular season champion Conference regular season and conference tournament champion Division regular season champion Division regular season and conference tournament champion Conference tournament champion
