= Steve Fisher (basketball) =

American basketball coach (born 1945)

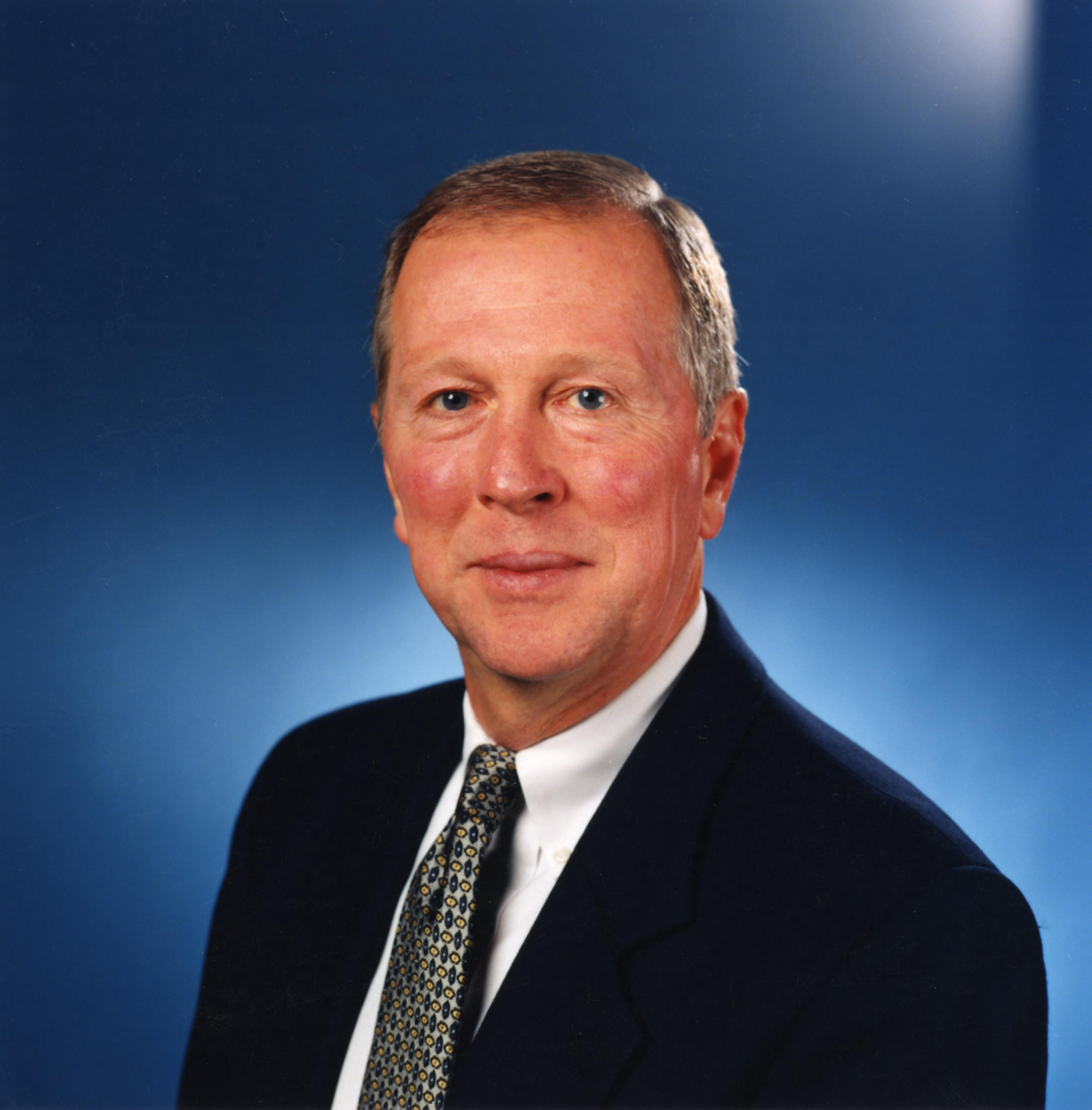
- Fisher c. 1996

Biographical details
- Born: March 24, 1945 (age 81); Herrin, Illinois, U.S.

Playing career
- 1965–1967: Illinois State

Coaching career (HC unless noted)
- 1971–1979: Rich East HS
- 1979–1982: Western Michigan (assistant)
- 1982–1989: Michigan (assistant)
- 1989–1997: Michigan
- 1998–1999: Sacramento Kings (assistant)
- 1999–2017: San Diego State

Head coaching record
- Overall: 495–288

Accomplishments and honors

Championships
- NCAA Division I tournament (1989); 3 NCAA Regional – Final Four (1989, 1992*, 1993*); NIT (1997*); 4 MWC tournament (2002, 2006, 2010, 2011); 7 MWC regular season (2006, 2011, 2012, 2014–2016) * vacated by NCAA

Awards
- Naismith College Coach of the Year (2011); NABC Coach of the Year (2011); Adolph Rupp Cup (2011); Wooden Legends of Coaching Award (2015); 4× MWC Coach of the Year (2011, 2012, 2014, 2016)

Stephen Louis Fisher (born March 24, 1945) is an American former basketball coach. Fisher served as the head coach of the Michigan Wolverines, with whom he won the national championship in 1989, and was an assistant at Michigan, Western Michigan University, and the Sacramento Kings of the National Basketball Association. From 1999 to 2017, Fisher was the head coach of the San Diego State Aztecs.

Fisher attended Illinois State University, where he was a reserve guard on the Redbirds team that advanced to the Final Four of the 1967 NCAA College Division basketball tournament.

== University of Michigan ==
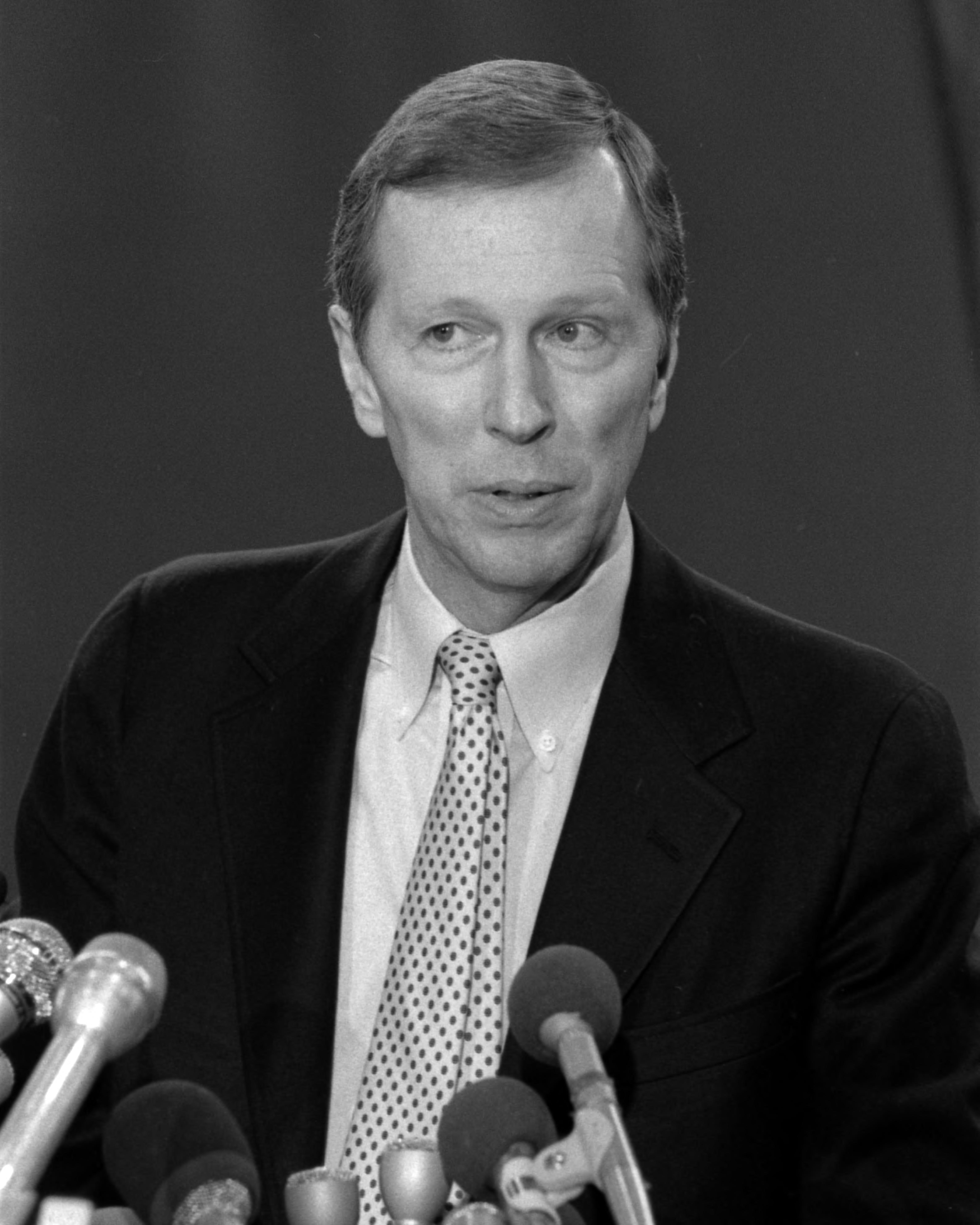
Fisher at a press conference following being appointed Interim Basketball Coach

Fisher moved to Ann Arbor, Michigan, in 1982 and took an assistant coaching job at the University of Michigan after having served as an assistant coach at Western Michigan University since 1979. In 1989, during the final week of the regular season, Michigan head coach Bill Frieder agreed to take the coaching job at Arizona State University beginning the next season. Frieder intended to coach Michigan through the end of the 1989 NCAA tournament. However, when he told athletic director Bo Schembechler of his intentions, Schembechler ordered Frieder to leave immediately and named Fisher as interim head coach. When announcing the promotion of Fisher, Schembechler famously said, "I don't want someone from Arizona State coaching the Michigan team. A Michigan man is going to coach Michigan."

Initially, Fisher was not expected to retain the position after the season. However, Fisher led the Wolverines to an improbable NCAA championship that season, thanks to a strong performance by forward Glen Rice. Schembechler hired him as the school's permanent head coach a week after the championship game. Fisher hired Brian Dutcher as Assistant Head Coach. Michigan credits the 1988–89 regular season to Frieder and the NCAA tournament to Fisher. Because of the unusual circumstances surrounding the timing of Fisher's hiring, he is the only person to win the NCAA Men's Division I national championship without having ever experienced a loss as the team's head coach.

The next two seasons of the Fisher era were struggles. However, in 1991, Fisher signed one of the most talented incoming freshman classes of all time. High school stars Chris Webber, Jalen Rose, Ray Jackson, Jimmy King, and Juwan Howard all signed with Fisher and Michigan, forming what became known as the "Fab Five". Together, they helped lead the Wolverines to the national title game in their freshman year, only to lose to Duke. As sophomores, they again reached the title game, this time losing to North Carolina. In that game, Webber was called for a technical foul with 11 seconds remaining in the game when he signaled for a timeout when the Wolverines had none left.

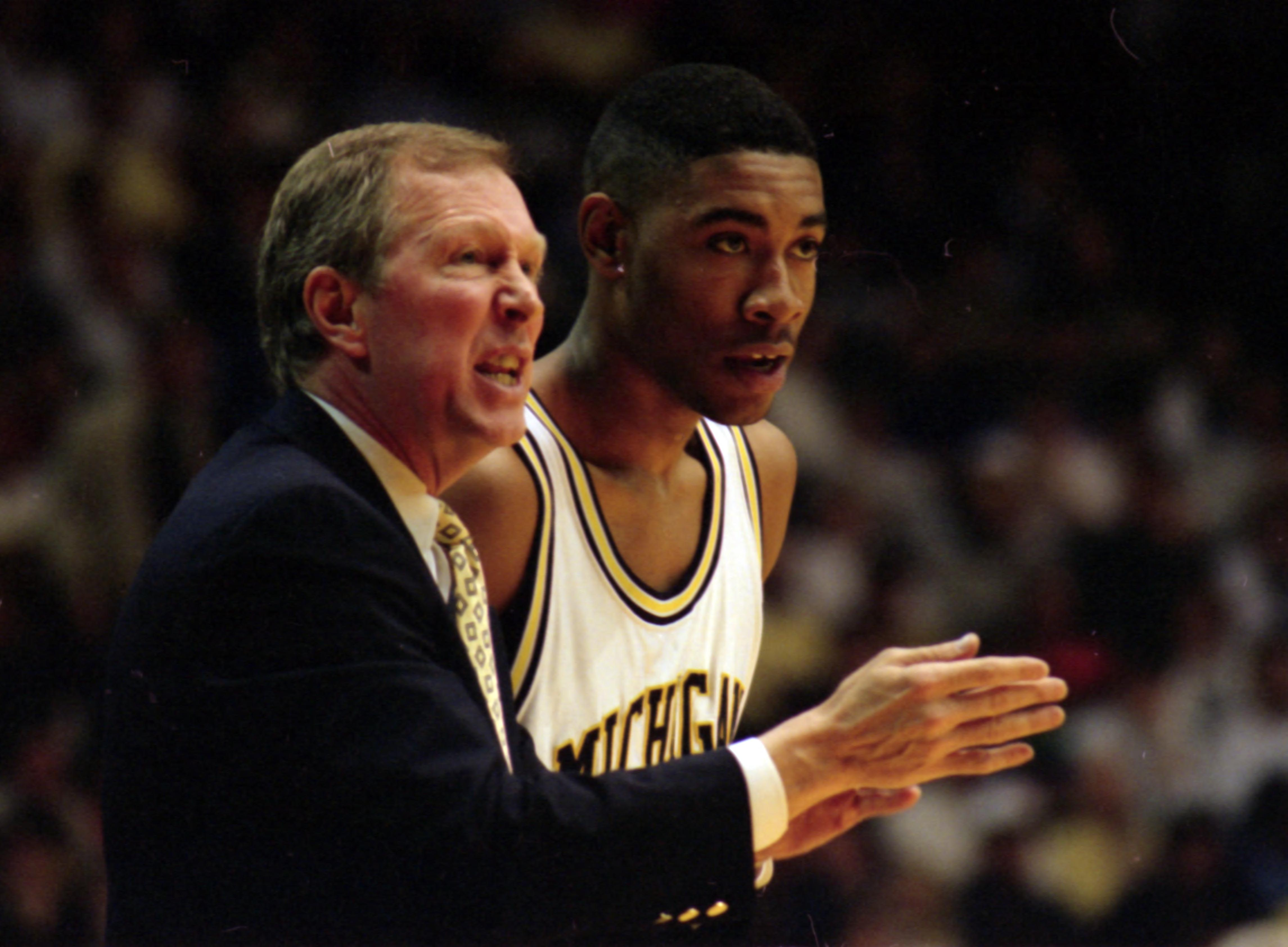
Fisher with Jimmy King in 1992

After the title-game loss to the Tar Heels, Webber went pro; Rose and Howard followed after an elite eight loss to the eventual National Champion Arkansas Razorbacks. The Wolverines would not reach the same heights until 2013, although they reached the postseason each of the next five seasons and won the 1997 National Invitation Tournament.

In October 1997, Michigan fired Fisher as a result of an off-court scandal (see section below).

Fisher was out of coaching for the 1997–98 season before taking a job as an assistant with the Sacramento Kings.

In 1999, Fisher took over as coach of a San Diego State program and brought Brian Dutcher with him. The school had suffered losing records in 13 of the previous 14 years. In the season before he arrived, the Aztecs had won just four games, but within two seasons Fisher had brought the team up to a .500 record, and led them to a 21–12 record and an NCAA Tournament appearance in year three of his regime. He has since led them to seven other NCAA tourneys, and five appearances in the National Invitation Tournament.

== Ed Martin scandal ==
In 1997, after it was revealed that Maurice Taylor had visited Ed Martin, a retired Ford electrician and University of Michigan booster, the school launched an investigation. After the investigators questioned Fisher's role in arranging complimentary tickets for Martin, Fisher was fired a week before practice began for the 1997–98 season.

Later, additional facts surfaced that further damaged the program's reputation. In 2002, an indictment unsealed in a Detroit federal court charged Ed Martin with running an illegal gambling operation and money laundering. Additionally, it claimed that Martin gave Webber $280,000 in illicit loans while Webber was in high school and college, with another $336,000 allegedly going to three other former Wolverine players – Taylor, Robert Traylor and Louis Bullock. Martin ultimately pleaded guilty, but died in February 2003.

As a result of the revelations, Michigan imposed its own sanctions on the basketball program in 2002, vacating its two Final Four games from the 1992 NCAA Tournament and its standing as the tournament's runner-up. It also vacated the entire 1992–93 season, as well as every game from 1995–96 to 1998–99. Michigan also withdrew from postseason consideration for the 2002–03 season, and removed the banners hanging in Crisler Arena that commemorated their post-season appearances and removed references to the named players' records. The move came because the payments may have compromised the four players' amateur status. The NCAA accepted Michigan's sanctions, and additionally placed the school on probation until 2006. It also ordered Michigan to disassociate itself from the four players until 2013.

The discoveries did not impact Fisher's career with San Diego State (and no new allegations have occurred in conjunction with that program). Fisher denied any knowledge of the Martin misconduct. The NCAA ultimately faulted Fisher for allowing Martin access to his players (though his ties to Michigan dated to the Frieder era), but otherwise cleared him of wrongdoing.

== San Diego State ==
In 1999, Fisher took over the basketball program at San Diego State University. The Aztecs had not been to the postseason since their NCAA appearance in 1985.

In his third year, Fisher led the Aztecs to their first Mountain West Conference tournament title, and finished with a 21–12 record and continued the upward surge of the program. They returned to the NCAA tournament for the first time since that 1984–1985 team. During the 2002–2003 season (his fourth year), Fisher's Aztecs returned to the postseason when they hosted an NIT first-round game against UCSB. The Aztecs earned their first ever Division I postseason win. After two rebuilding seasons (2003–2004 and 2004–2005), the Aztecs returned to the NCAA Tournament in 2005–2006, Fisher's seventh season. That year, the Aztecs began a 10-year streak of 20+ win seasons while capturing their first ever Mountain West Conference regular season championship, and winning their second Mountain West Conference tournament championship.

In 2009, the Aztecs earned a school-record 26 victories and reached the semifinals of the NIT. It was their third consecutive trip to the NIT, and fourth consecutive postseason appearance. In the 2009–2010 season, the Aztecs won another 20+ games and the Mountain West tournament, earning their third NCAA tournament berth under Fisher. In 2010–2011, the Aztecs, ranked #25 in the preseason AP poll and were ranked #4 late in the season, the highest ranking in school history. The Aztecs received three first-place votes in the coaches' poll at one point, spending nearly the entire season in the top 10 and winning their first-ever NCAA tournament game en route to a Sweet 16 berth. They set a school record in the 2010–11 season with 34 wins. That said, they had only three losses, the first two against Sweet-16 team BYU (whom they beat in MWC tournament championship game) and their third to eventual NCAA champion UConn.

Overall Fisher guided SDSU to the NCAA Tournament in 2002, 2006, 2010, 2011, 2012, 2013, 2014, and 2015 and the postseason NIT in 2003, 2007, 2008, 2009, and 2016 to go along with twelve 20-win seasons (eleven consecutive from 2005–present). Additionally, under Fisher, the Aztecs have won or shared six MWC regular season titles (2006 outright, 2011 shared with BYU, 2012 shared with New Mexico, 2014 outright, 2015 shared with Boise State, 2016 outright), and won four MWC tournaments (2002, 2006, 2010, 2011). Since the 2005–06 season, Steve Fisher led the Aztecs to eleven consecutive post-season appearances including six consecutive in the NCAA Tournament—the first time the Aztecs have done this as a Division I team.

Just ten head coaches have won the NIT as well as the NCAA tournaments. The others are Nat Holman (who did it in the same year), John Calipari, Vadal Peterson, Nolan Richardson, Bobby Knight, Adolph Rupp, Joe B. Hall, Al McGuire, Dean Smith and Jim Calhoun.

Fisher won his 300th game as SDSU head coach on January 31, 2014, against Colorado State University.

On October 29, 2015, SDSU dedicated the basketball court at Viejas Arena to Fisher, naming it Steve Fisher Court.

On April 10, 2017, Fisher reportedly informed SDSU of his intent to retire, which was followed by a formal announcement the following day that confirmed his retirement.

== Head coaching record ==
Record table
Season	Team	Overall	Conference	Standing	Postseason
Michigan Wolverines (Big Ten Conference) (1989–1997)
*1988–89	Michigan	6–0			NCAA Division I champion
1989–90	Michigan	23–8	12–6	3rd	NCAA Division I Round of 32
1990–91	Michigan	14–15	7–11	8th	NIT first round
^1991–92	Michigan	25–9	11–7	T–3rd	NCAA Division I Runner-up
^^1992–93	Michigan	31–5	15–3	2nd	NCAA Division I Runner-up
1993–94	Michigan	24–8	13–5	2nd	NCAA Division I Elite Eight
1994–95	Michigan	17–14	11–7	T–3rd	NCAA Division I Round of 64
^^1995–96	Michigan	21–11	10–8	T–5th	NCAA Division I Round of 64
^^1996–97	Michigan	24–11	9–9	T–6th	NIT champion
Michigan:		108–53 (.671)	54–36 (.600)		
San Diego State Aztecs (Mountain West Conference) (1999–2017)
1999–00	San Diego State	5–23	0–14	8th	
2000–01	San Diego State	14–14	4–10	7th	
2001–02	San Diego State	21–12	7–7	T–4th	NCAA Division I Round of 64
2002–03	San Diego State	16–14	6–8	5th	NIT second round
2003–04	San Diego State	14–16	5–9	T–5th	
2004–05	San Diego State	11–18	4–10	6th	
2005–06	San Diego State	24–9	13–3	1st	NCAA Division I Round of 64
2006–07	San Diego State	22–11	10–6	T–3rd	NIT second round
2007–08	San Diego State	20–13	9–7	4th	NIT first round
2008–09	San Diego State	26–10	11–5	4th	NIT semifinal
2009–10	San Diego State	25–9	11–5	T–3rd	NCAA Division I Round of 64
2010–11	San Diego State	34–3	14–2	T–1st	NCAA Division I Sweet 16
2011–12	San Diego State	26–8	10–4	T–1st	NCAA Division I Round of 64
2012–13	San Diego State	23–11	9–7	4th	NCAA Division I Round of 32
2013–14	San Diego State	31–5	16–2	1st	NCAA Division I Sweet 16
2014–15	San Diego State	27–9	14–4	T–1st	NCAA Division I Round of 32
2015–16	San Diego State	28–10	16–2	1st	NIT semifinal
2016–17	San Diego State	19–14	9–9	6th	
San Diego State:		386–209 (.649)	168–114 (.582)		
Total:		495–288 (.627)			
National champion Postseason invitational champion Conference regular season champion Conference regular season and conference tournament champion Division regular season champion Division regular season and conference tournament champion Conference tournament champion

*Fisher served as interim coach during the 1989 NCAA tournament after Bill Frieder resigned. Michigan credits the 1988–89 regular season to Frieder and the NCAA tournament to Fisher.

^Michigan vacated its two 1992 Final Four games and its status as tournament runner-up. Official record is 24–8.

^^Entire season, including postseason tournament appearances, later vacated by the school.

Michigan total record includes games subsequently vacated by the school.

== See also ==
- List of NCAA Division I Men's Final Four appearances by coach
