= 2003–04 Lehigh Mountain Hawks men's basketball team =

American college basketball season

2003–04 Lehigh Mountain Hawks men's basketball

Patriot League Regular Season Champions Patriot League tournament champions

NCAA tournament, Play-in game
- Conference: Patriot League
- Record: 20–11 (10–4 Patriot)
- Head coach: Billy Taylor (2nd season)
- Home arena: Stabler Arena

2003–04 Patriot League men's basketball standings
	Conf.				Overall
Team	W		L	PCT	W		L	PCT
Lehigh †	10	–	4	.714	20	–	11	.645
American	10	–	4	.714	18	–	13	.581
Lafayette	9	–	5	.643	18	–	10	.643
Bucknell	9	–	5	.643	14	–	15	.483
Holy Cross	7	–	7	.500	13	–	15	.464
Colgate	6	–	8	.429	15	–	14	.517
Army	3	–	11	.214	6	–	21	.222
Navy	2	–	12	.143	5	–	23	.179
† 2004 Patriot League tournament winner

The 2003–04 Lehigh Mountain Hawks men's basketball team represented Lehigh University during the 2003–04 NCAA Division I men's basketball season. The Mountain Hawks, led by second-year head coach Billy Taylor, played their home games at Stabler Arena and were members of the Patriot League. They finished the season 20–11, 10–4 in Patriot League play to finish in first place in the conference.

Following the regular season, Lehigh won the Patriot League Basketball tournament to earn the conference's automatic bid into the 2004 NCAA tournament. This was their third NCAA Tournament appearance and first in 16 years, with the most recent trip in 1988. As one of two No. 16 seed in the Midwest region, they fell to fellow No. 16 seed Florida A&M in the play-in game.

== Roster ==
2003–04 Lehigh Mountain Hawks men's basketball team
Players	Coaches
Pos. / # / Name / Height / Weight / Year / Hometown; G / 1 / Austen Rowland / 6 ft 1 in (1.85 m) / 180 lb (82 kg) / Sr / Hyattsville, Maryland	Head coach: Billy Taylor; Assistant coach(es) Legend: (C) Team captain; (S) Suspended; (I) Ineligible; (W) Walk-on; Injured; Current redshirt; Roster

== Schedule and results ==
Date time, TV	Rank^{#}	Opponent^{#}	Result	Record	Site (attendance) city, state
Non-conference regular season
Dec 1, 2003*		at No. 3 Connecticut	L 55–75	1–3	Harry A. Gampel Pavilion; Storrs, Connecticut
Dec 30, 2003*		at No. 25 Vanderbilt	L 59–85	6–5	Memorial Gymnasium; Nashville, Tennessee
Patriot League regular season
Patriot League tournament
Mar 6, 2004*		vs. Navy; Quarterfinals	W 62–60 ^{OT}	18–10	The Show Place Arena; Upper Marlboro, Maryland
Mar 7, 2004*		vs. Bucknell; Semifinals	W 60–45	19–10	The Show Place Arena; Upper Marlboro, Maryland
Mar 14, 2004*		American; Championship game	W 59–57	20–10	Stabler Arena; Bethlehem, Pennsylvania
NCAA tournament
Mar 16, 2004*	(16 MW)	vs. (16 MW) Florida A&M; Play-in game	L 57–72	20–11	UD Arena; Dayton, Ohio
*Non-conference game. ^{#}Rankings from AP Poll. (#) Tournament seedings in parentheses. MW=Midwest. All times are in Eastern Time (#) during NCAA Tournament is seed with Region.

== Awards and honors ==
- Austen Rowland – Patriot League Player of the Year
