= 2003–04 BYU Cougars men's basketball team =

American college basketball season

2003–04 BYU Cougars men's basketball

NCAA tournament, first round
- Conference: Mountain West Conference
- Record: 21–9 (10–4 MWC)
- Head coach: Steve Cleveland (7th season)
- Home arena: Marriott Center

2003–04 Mountain West Conference men's basketball standings
	Conf.				Overall
Team	W		L	PCT	W		L	PCT
Air Force	12	–	2	.857	22	–	7	.759
BYU	10	–	4	.714	21	–	9	.700
Utah †	9	–	5	.643	24	–	9	.727
UNLV	7	–	7	.500	18	–	13	.581
New Mexico	5	–	9	.357	14	–	14	.500
San Diego State	5	–	9	.357	14	–	16	.467
Wyoming	4	–	10	.286	11	–	17	.393
Colorado State	4	–	10	.286	13	–	16	.448
† 2004 Mountain West tournament winner Rankings from AP Poll

The 2003–04 BYU Cougars men's basketball team represented Brigham Young University as a member of the Mountain West Conference during the 2003–04 season. Led by head coach Steve Cleveland, the Cougars finished second in the Mountain West Conference regular season standings. The team received an at-large bid to the NCAA tournament – their third bid in four years under Cleveland. BYU finished the season with a 21–9 record (10–4 MWC).

== Roster ==
2003–04 BYU Cougars men's basketball team
Players
Coaches

Pos.	#	Name	Height	Weight	Year	Hometown
C	40	Dan Howard	7 ft 0 in (2.13 m)	225 lb (102 kg)	Sr	Kaysville, Utah
C	55	Rafael Araújo	6 ft 11 in (2.11 m)	280 lb (127 kg)	Sr

Head coach

- Steve Cleveland

Assistant coach(es)

Legend

- (C) Team captain
- (S) Suspended
- (I) Ineligible
- (W) Walk-on
- Injured
- Current redshirt

Roster

== Schedule and results ==
Date time, TV	Rank^{#}	Opponent^{#}	Result	Record	Site city, state
Regular Season
Nov 21, 2003*		Southern Utah	W 88–54	1–0	Marriott Center; Provo, Utah
Nov 26, 2003*		at California	L 46–47	1–1	Haas Pavilion; Berkeley, California
Nov 29, 2003*		Utah Valley	W 84–65	2–1	Marriott Center; Provo, Utah
Dec 2, 2003*		at Boise State	W 75–69	3–1	BSU Pavilion; Boise, Idaho
Dec 6, 2003*		vs. No. 25 Oklahoma State	W 76–71	4–1	Delta Center; Salt Lake City, Utah
Dec 10, 2003		Western Oregon	W 92–56	5–1 (2–0)	Marriott Center; Provo, Utah
Dec 13, 2003*		USC	W 85–61	6–1	Marriott Center; Provo, Utah
Dec 20, 2003*		Weber State	W 86–65	7–1	Marriott Center; Provo, Utah
Dec 23, 2003*		at Utah State	L 74–76	7–2	Dee Glen Smith Spectrum; Logan, Utah
Dec 29, 2003*		vs. Idaho State	W 90–66	8–2	Leavey Center; Santa Clara, California
Dec 30, 2003*		at Santa Clara	W 68–66	9–2	Leavey Center; Santa Clara, California
Jan 2, 2004*		Saint Mary's	W 70–55	10–2	Marriott Center; Provo, Utah
Jan 7, 2004*		at NC State	L 62–89	10–3	RBC Center; Raleigh, North Carolina
Jan 12, 2004		at San Diego State	L 61–65	10–4 (0–1)	Cox Arena; San Diego, California
Jan 17, 2004		Colorado State	W 82–53	11–4 (1–1)	Marriott Center; Provo, Utah
Jan 19, 2004		Wyoming	W 78–64	12–4 (2–1)	Marriott Center; Provo, Utah
Jan 24, 2004		at Air Force	L 52–74	12–5 (2–2)	Clune Arena; Colorado Springs, Colorado
Jan 26, 2004		at New Mexico	L 63–65	12–6 (2–3)	University Arena; Albuquerque, New Mexico
Jan 31, 2004		at Utah	L 56–64	12–7 (2–4)	Jon M. Huntsman Center; Salt Lake City, Utah
Feb 7, 2004		UNLV	W 64–61	13–7 (3–4)	Marriott Center; Provo, Utah
Feb 9, 2004		San Diego State	W 83–69 ^{OT}	14–7 (4–4)	Marriott Center; Provo, Utah
Feb 14, 2004		at Wyoming	W 67–53	15–7 (5–4)	Arena-Auditorium; Laramie, Wyoming
Feb 16, 2004		at Colorado State	W 79–73	16–7 (6–4)	Moby Arena; Fort Collins, Colorado
Feb 21, 2004		New Mexico	W 88–71	17–7 (7–4)	Marriott Center; Provo, Utah
Feb 23, 2004		Air Force	W 67–61	18–7 (8–4)	Marriott Center; Provo, Utah
Mar 1, 2004		Utah	W 70–57	19–7 (9–4)	Marriott Center; Provo, Utah
Mar 6, 2004		at UNLV	W 89–88	20–7 (10–4)	Thomas & Mack Center; Las Vegas, Nevada
MWC tournament
Mar 11, 2004*		vs. Wyoming; Quarterfinals	W 79–74	21–7	The Pepsi Center; Denver, Colorado
Mar 12, 2004*		vs. Utah; Semifinals	L 51–54	21–8	The Pepsi Center; Denver, Colorado
NCAA tournament
Mar 18, 2004*	(12 W)	vs. (5 W) No. 20 Syracuse; First round	L 75–80	21–9	The Pepsi Center; Denver, Colorado
*Non-conference game. ^{#}Rankings from AP Poll. (#) Tournament seedings in parentheses. W=West.

== Awards and honors ==
- Rafael Araújo – MWC co-Player of the Year
