= Attarius Norwood =

American basketball player (born 1981)

Personal information
- Born: May 14, 1981 (age 45)
- Listed height: 6 ft 8 in (2.03 m)
- Listed weight: 228 lb (103 kg)

Career information
- College: Mississippi Valley State (2000–2004)
- NBA draft: 2004: undrafted
- Playing career: 2005–2008
- Position: Forward

Career history
- 2005: Gulf Coast Bandits
- 200?–200?: Obras Sanitarias
- 200?–200?: Barreirense
- 2008: Spann S.A.

Career highlights
- SWAC Player of the Year (2004); AP Honorable Mention All-American (2004); 2× First-team All-SWAC (2003, 2004)

Attarius Norwood (born May 14, 1981) is a retired American professional basketball player and current assistant principal at Crystal Springs Middle School in Mississippi. He is best known for his collegiate basketball career at Mississippi Valley State University (MVSU) in which he was named the Southwestern Athletic Conference Player of the Year as a senior in 2003–04. He was a two-time First Team All-SWAC player in 2002–03 and 2003–04, and the Associated Press tabbed him as an honorable mention All-American in 2004. In Norwood's senior season he averaged 14.3 points and 5 rebounds per game en route to the player of the year award.

After graduating from MVSU, Norwood has a brief professional career. He played for the Gulf Coast Bandits in the short-lived World Basketball Association in 2005, followed by stints in Argentina, Portugal, then back in the United States in 2008 before retiring. He has since become a school administrator in Copiah County, Mississippi.
