= Jeff Bzdelik =

American basketball coach (born 1952)

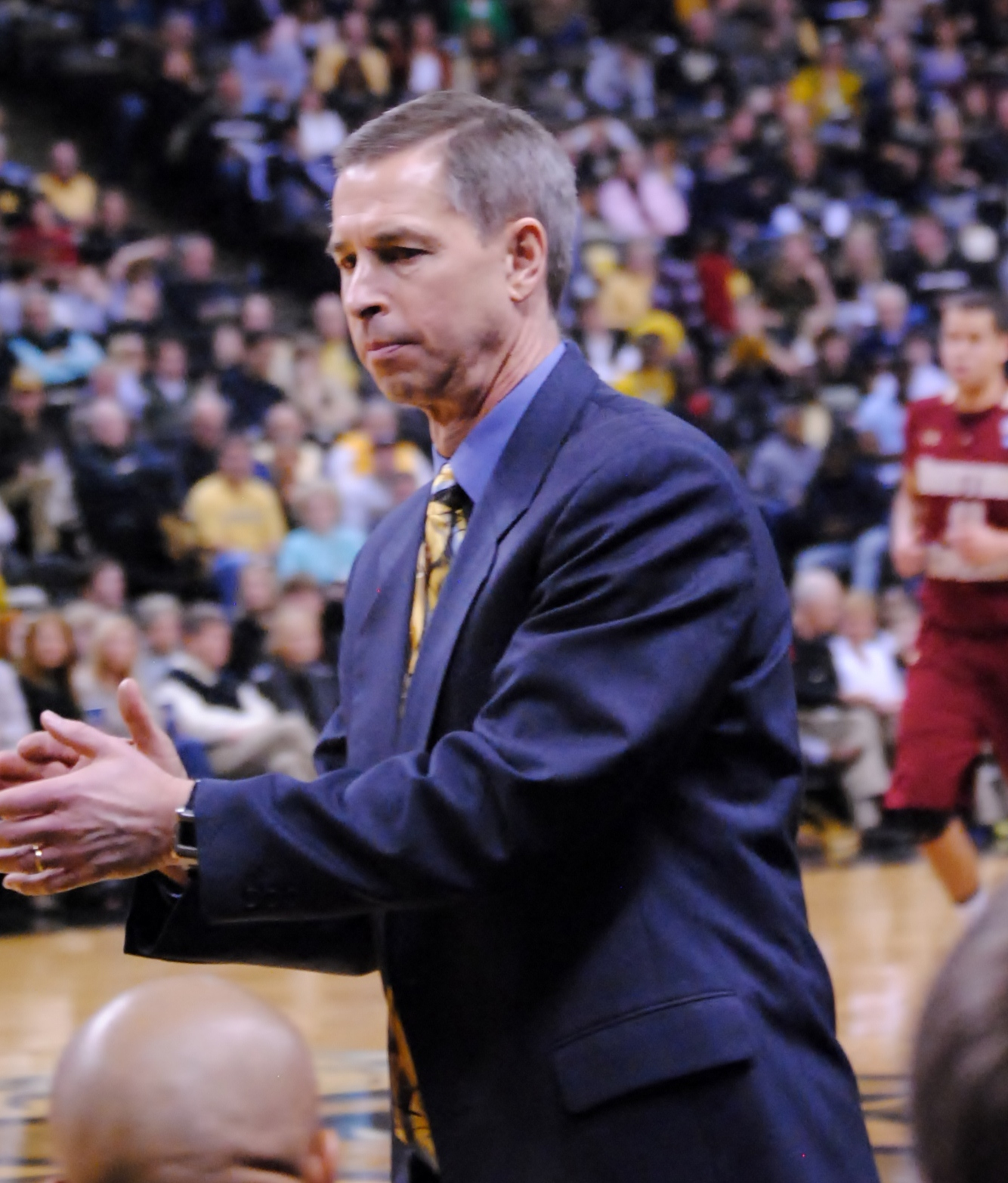
- Bzdelik coaching for Wake Forest in 2012

Personal information
- Born: December 1, 1952 (age 73) Chicago, Illinois, U.S.
- Listed height: 6 ft 0 in (1.83 m)
- Listed weight: 150 lb (68 kg)

Career information
- High school: Prospect (Mount Prospect, Illinois)
- College: UIC (1972–1976)
- Coaching career: 1978–2020

Career history

Coaching
- 1978–1980: Davidson (assistant)
- 1980–1986: Northwestern (assistant)
- 1986–1988: UMBC
- 1988–1994: Washington Bullets (assistant)
- 1995–2001: Miami Heat (assistant)
- 2002–2004: Denver Nuggets
- 2005–2007: Air Force
- 2007–2010: Colorado
- 2010–2014: Wake Forest
- 2014–2016: Memphis Grizzlies (assistant)
- 2016–2019: Houston Rockets (assistant)
- 2019–2020: New Orleans Pelicans (associate HC)

Jeffrey Joseph Bzdelik (/bəzˈdɛlɪk/) (born December 1, 1952) is an American professional basketball coach who most recently served as associate head coach for the New Orleans Pelicans of the National Basketball Association (NBA). He was head coach of the Denver Nuggets in the NBA for slightly over two seasons, from 2002 until he was fired near the end of 2004. He also served as a college head coach at UMBC, Air Force, Colorado, and Wake Forest.

== Early life ==
Bzdelik earned four varsity letters while playing basketball at the University of Illinois-Chicago, and was named team MVP in 1975–76. He also spent six years in the Army National Guard.

== Coaching career ==
=== Early career in college basketball ===
Bzdelik began his coaching career in 1978 as an assistant at Davidson College in North Carolina. He moved to Northwestern University in 1980, where he spent six seasons as an assistant, helping the Wildcats to their first NIT appearance in school history. He then took the head coaching position at the University of Maryland-Baltimore County for two years.

=== Move to NBA as assistant ===
Washington Bullets coach Wes Unseld hired Bzdelik as an assistant in 1988. He stayed there until Unseld resigned in 1994. He then took a scouting position with Pat Riley and the New York Knicks before moving with Riley to the Miami Heat the next season as an assistant coach and advance scout. In 1997, Sports Illustrated named Bzdelik the NBA's best advance scout. In 2000, USA Today named him one of the NBA's top five assistants.

=== Denver Nuggets ===
Bzdelik was hired in 2001 by the Denver Nuggets to be their East Coast scout. He was promoted to assistant coach in July 2002 and impressed team management by going 6–0 in the Rocky Mountain Revue summer league and motivating the team's young players. He was named the head coach of the Nuggets on August 21, 2002. The team struggled in his first year, winning just 17 games. They bounced back in his second season to finish with 43 wins, reaching the postseason for the first time since 1995, before losing in the first round to eventual Western Conference finalist Minnesota. The Nuggets improved their win total by 26 games – the most ever by a team that won less than 20 games the year before and at the time the sixth-best single-season improvement in NBA history. His team also became the first in the history of the NBA to go from less than 20 wins to the playoffs the next year (since going to an 82-game schedule in 1976).

The team had high expectations in his third year after signing Kenyon Martin as a free agent. The Nuggets, though, struggled out of the gate to a 13–15 start and Bzdelik was fired on December 28, 2004.

=== Air Force Academy ===
On May 18, 2005, Bzedlik signed a multiyear contract to become the head coach at the US Air Force Academy. The team made a first round NCAA tournament appearance – just the fourth in school history – his first year after finishing with the best record (24–7) in the program's 50-year history. The Falcons have not appeared in the NCAA tournament since. The next year, they surpassed the record from the previous year by winning 26 games and made it to the NIT semifinals.

=== Colorado ===
Bzdelik left Air Force on April 4, 2007, to become the head basketball coach for the Colorado Buffaloes for three seasons. In his third and final season at CU, Bzdelik's team finished the regular season with four wins in its last six games. A first-round loss to Texas Tech in the Big 12 Tournament ended the Buff's season and left the team with a 15–16 record, their third straight losing season under Bzdelik.

=== Wake Forest University ===
On April 13, 2010, Bzdelik left Colorado to become the 21st head men's basketball coach at Wake Forest University, inheriting a successful team that was 21–12 the previous season, and had made back to back NCAA Tournament appearances. He resigned from Wake Forest in March 2014 after tumultuous tenure. His records at Wake Forest were an abysmal 8-24 (2010–11), 13-18 (2011–12), 13-18 (2012–13) and 17-16 (in his final season in 2013–14).

=== Memphis Grizzlies ===
On July 31, 2014, Bzdelik was signed by the Memphis Grizzlies to be an assistant coach. The Grizzlies completed the regular season 55–27, tied for the fifth-best record in the entire NBA. During his 19 years in the NBA, Bzdelik served as a head or assistant coach for 12 teams that advanced to the playoffs.

=== Houston Rockets ===
On June 1, 2016, Bzdelik became associate head coach of the Houston Rockets, joining the staff of newly appointed head coach Mike D'Antoni.

"It stood out to us that he had so much head coaching experience," Rockets general manager Daryl Morey said. "That level of experience and gravitas really helps when you are explaining the battle plan. Second, the coaching tree he comes from is second to none. And there was a lot of respect from being the primary guy with the Memphis defense."

One of the least-discussed plots was that head coach Mike D'Antoni willingly accepted a "defensive coordinator" with the addition of Jeff Bzdelik. D'Antoni brought the glitz, the glamor and the stats to Houston, while Bzdelik has helped keep the team from having a one-track mind.

"Players hear one voice offensively and one voice defensively," D'Antoni said recently when talking about Bzdelik's role on the NBA A-Z podcast.

Jonathan Feigen of the Houston Chronicle wrote, "It adds up to (Bzdelik's) place on D'Antoni's right, with respect and freedom to more than run the defense, but to change the mindset of the team happy to fire away but that has come to understand it must do more."

"We discuss everything, how we want to do things, how we want to present it," D'Antoni said. "He has a great connection with players. He has to be the little pest to get them to pay attention to detail. He's great at it. It works for me because I trust him completely. It allows me to concentrate on relationships, the offensive side, dealing with (media). I knew he was thorough. He's perfect."

In 2016–17, the Rockets were the best team in the NBA at defending the handler in ball screens. They ranked second in charges drawn, second in defending the screener/roller in ball screens, third in forcing a second action in ball screens and third in defensive 3-point field goal percentage.

According to the Houston Chronicle, "the Rockets improved in the ways they needed to most, in defending the arc and in transition. But Bzdelik knows that changing mindsets takes more time."

"The first thing we talked about when we got together in the summer was 'If you don't defend, you're not going to win,' " Bzdelik said. "History shows that. It's that simple. You're not going to run around scoring a lot of points, getting open shots in the playoffs. You better guard. And you can't just turn it on and turn it off."

"All year long, we've worked on our habits for this moment. There needs to be an understanding that it takes all five players on the court to get stops. Through the whole course of the year, we've been on players to understand we need to have the right habits. When you talk about championship cultures, teammates don't just play with each other, they play for each other. They refuse to let each other down. That's the culture we're trying to create defensively."

In 2017–18, the Rockets won a franchise record 65 games, posting the NBA's best record for the first time. Bzdelik coached under D'Antoni in the 2018 NBA All-Star Game in Los Angeles. The Rockets lost the Conference Finals to the eventual NBA champion Golden State Warriors in seven games. Star guard Chris Paul missed Games 6 and 7 of that series with a hamstring injury.

Defensively, the Rockets were "inconsistent in the first half of the season, but had the third-rated defense in the NBA since Harden and Luc Mbah a Moute returned from injuries in mid-January at roughly the mid-point of the season."

During the season, Bzdelik was profiled by VICE Sports. "In over a dozen interviews with coaches, players, and basketball executives who have worked with Bzdelik, the portrait of a hyper-driven, beloved, and tactically adept coach who has stockpiled inestimable reams of information over the course of an astounding career emerges." Hall of Fame coach and executive Pat Riley, who worked with Bzdelik in both New York and Miami, said, "I can't think of a man in the NBA that has more experience, more knowledge, more wisdom about how to defend in the contemporary game today, than Jeff. I was just always impressed with his scouting reports. He was very detailed. Very neat. Things were logical and coherent. He had all the right calls. We knew what the other team was gonna run."

On September 17, 2018, Bzdelik announced his retirement from coaching in the NBA. On November 5, 2018, Bzdelik agreed to return to the Rockets. At the time, Houston was ranked 21st in the league on defense after being sixth the year before.

On May 18, 2019, Bzdelik was let go by the Rockets during the off-season. Prior to this, he had publicly been noncommittal to returning in following seasons.

=== New Orleans Pelicans ===
On September 13, 2019, Bzdelik was hired by the New Orleans Pelicans as associate head coach. On November 16, 2020, Bzdelik was not retained by the Pelicans.

== Head coaching record ==
=== NBA ===
Legend
Regular season	G	Games coached	W	Games won	L	Games lost	W–L %	Win–loss %
Playoffs	PG	Playoff games	PW	Playoff wins	PL	Playoff losses	PW–L %	Playoff win–loss %

Team	Year	G	W	L	W–L%	Finish	PG	PW	PL	PW–L%	Result
Denver	2002–03	82	17	65	.207	7th in Midwest	—	—	—	—	Missed playoffs
Denver	2003–04	82	43	39	.524	6th in Midwest	5	1	4	.200	Lost in first round
Denver	2004–05	28	13	15	.464	(fired)	—	—	—	—	—
Career		192	73	119	.380		5	1	4	.200	

=== College ===
Record table
Season	Team	Overall	Conference	Standing	Postseason
UMBC Retrievers (NCAA Division I independent) (1986–1988)
1986–87	UMBC	12–16			
1987–88	UMBC	13–15			
UMBC:		25–31			
Air Force Falcons (Mountain West Conference) (2005–2007)
2005–06	Air Force	24–7	12–4	2nd	NCAA Division I Round of 64
2006–07	Air Force	26–9	10–6	T–3rd	NIT Semifinal
Air Force:		50–16	22–10		
Colorado Buffaloes (Big 12 Conference) (2007–2010)
2007–08	Colorado	12–20	3–13	12th	
2008–09	Colorado	9–22	1–15	12th	
2009–10	Colorado	15–16	6–10	8th	
Colorado:		36–58	10–38		
Wake Forest Demon Deacons (Atlantic Coast Conference) (2010–2014)
2010–11	Wake Forest	8–24	1–15	12th	
2011–12	Wake Forest	13–18	4–12	T–9th	
2012–13	Wake Forest	13–18	6–12	T–9th	
2013–14	Wake Forest	17–16	6–12	T–13th	
Wake Forest:		51–76	17–51		
Total:		160–179			
