= 2004 Patriot League men's basketball tournament =

- Classification: Division I
- Season: 2003–04
- Teams: 8
- Site: The Show Place Arena; Upper Marlboro, Maryland
- Finals site: Stabler Arena; Bethlehem, Pennsylvania
- Champions: Lehigh (1st title)
- Winning coach: Billy Taylor (1st title)
- MVP: Austen Rowland (Lehigh)

2003–04 Patriot League men's basketball standings
	Conf.				Overall
Team	W		L	PCT	W		L	PCT
Lehigh †	10	–	4	.714	20	–	11	.645
American	10	–	4	.714	18	–	13	.581
Lafayette	9	–	5	.643	18	–	10	.643
Bucknell	9	–	5	.643	14	–	15	.483
Holy Cross	7	–	7	.500	13	–	15	.464
Colgate	6	–	8	.429	15	–	14	.517
Army	3	–	11	.214	6	–	21	.222
Navy	2	–	12	.143	5	–	23	.179
† 2004 Patriot League tournament winner

The 2004 Patriot League men's basketball tournament was played at The Show Place Arena in Upper Marlboro, Maryland and Stabler Arena in Bethlehem, Pennsylvania after the conclusion of the 2003–04 regular season. Top seed Lehigh defeated #2 seed American, 59–57 in the championship game, to win its first Patriot League Tournament title. The Mountain Hawks earned an automatic bid to the 2004 NCAA tournament as one of two #16 seeds in the St. Louis region. Florida A&M defeated Lehigh in an opening round game in Dayton, Ohio.

== Format ==
All eight league members participated in the tournament, with teams seeded according to regular season conference record.

== Bracket ==
Quarterfinals; March 6
1	Lehigh	62*
8	Navy	60
4	Bucknell	66
5	Holy Cross	60
3	Lafayette	66
6	Colgate	67*
2	American	65
7	Army	48

Semifinals; March 7
1	Lehigh	60
5	Bucknell	45
6	Colgate	55
2	American	65

Championship game March 14
1	Lehigh	59
2	American	57

* denotes overtime period
