= 2003–04 Utah Utes men's basketball team =

American college basketball season

2003–04 Utah Utes men's basketball

Mountain West tournament champions

NCAA tournament, first round
- Conference: Mountain West Conference
- Record: 24–9 (9–5 MWC)
- Head coach: Rick Majerus (15th season; first 20 games); Kerry Rupp (4th season; interim, final 13 games)
- Home arena: Jon M. Huntsman Center

2003–04 Mountain West Conference men's basketball standings
	Conf.				Overall
Team	W		L	PCT	W		L	PCT
Air Force	12	–	2	.857	22	–	7	.759
BYU	10	–	4	.714	21	–	9	.700
Utah †	9	–	5	.643	24	–	9	.727
UNLV	7	–	7	.500	18	–	13	.581
New Mexico	5	–	9	.357	14	–	14	.500
San Diego State	5	–	9	.357	14	–	16	.467
Wyoming	4	–	10	.286	11	–	17	.393
Colorado State	4	–	10	.286	13	–	16	.448
† 2004 Mountain West tournament winner Rankings from AP Poll

The 2003–04 Utah Utes men's basketball team represented the University of Utah as a member of the Mountain West Conference during the 2003–04 men's basketball season. This season would mark the end of an era for the Utah men's basketball program as head coach Rick Majerus, serving in his 15th season, retired due to health concerns after 20 games. Fourth-year assistant, Kerry Rupp, guided the program for the remainder of the season. The Utes finished with an overall record of 24–9 (9–5 WAC), won the Mountain West tournament, and received an automatic bid to the NCAA tournament.

== Roster ==
2003–04 Utah Utes men's basketball team
Players
Coaches

Pos.	#	Name	Height	Weight	Year	Hometown
C	4	Andrew Bogut	7 ft 0 in (2.13 m)	245 lb (111 kg)	Fr	Melbourne, Victoria
SG	15	Nick Jacobson	6 ft 4 in (1.93 m)	206 lb (93 kg)	Sr	Fargo, North Dakota
G	42	Richard Chaney	6 ft 4 in (1.93 m)	200 lb (91 kg)	So	Los Angeles, California
C	54	Tim Frost	6 ft 10 in (2.08 m)	240 lb (109 kg)	Sr	Klamath Falls, Oregon

Head coach

- Rick Majerus (Marquette)

Assistant coach(es)

Legend

- (C) Team captain
- (S) Suspended
- (I) Ineligible
- (W) Walk-on
- Injured
- Current redshirt

Roster

== Schedule and results ==
Date time, TV	Rank^{#}	Opponent^{#}	Result	Record	Site city, state
Non-conference regular season
Nov 17, 2003*		Georgia State	W 46–38	1–0	Jon M. Huntsman Center; Salt Lake City, Utah
Nov 19, 2003*		Minnesota; Preseason NIT	W 66–54	2–0	Jon M. Huntsman Center; Salt Lake City, Utah
Nov 23, 2003*		at Stony Brook; Preseason NIT	W 51–48	3–0	Stony Brook University Arena; Stony Brook, New York
Nov 26, 2003*		vs. Texas Tech; Preseason NIT	L 54–65	3–1	Madison Square Garden; New York, New York
Nov 28, 2003*		vs. No. 1 Connecticut; Preseason NIT	L 44–76	3–2	Madison Square Garden (8,910); New York, New York
Dec 3, 2003*		Utah State	W 56–45	4–2	Jon M. Huntsman Center; Salt Lake City, Utah
Dec 6, 2003*		San Diego	W 82–39	5–2	Jon M. Huntsman Center; Salt Lake City, Utah
Dec 13, 2003*		Savannah State	W 87–39	6–2	Jon M. Huntsman Center; Salt Lake City, Utah
Dec 16, 2003*		at LSU	L 51–65	6–3	Maravich Assembly Center; Baton Rouge, Louisiana
Dec 19, 2003*		Cal State Northridge	W 73–57	7–3	Jon M. Huntsman Center; Salt Lake City, Utah
Dec 23, 2003*		at Colorado	W 77–57	8–3	Coors Events Center; Boulder, Colorado
Dec 29, 2003*		Southern Utah	W 78–45	9–3	Jon M. Huntsman Center; Salt Lake City, Utah
Jan 3, 2004*		at Weber State	W 70–60	10–3	Dee Events Center; Ogden, Utah
Jan 5, 2004*		Pepperdine	W 76–69	11–3	Jon M. Huntsman Center; Salt Lake City, Utah
Jan 7, 2004*		Whitworth	W 71–49	12–3	Jon M. Huntsman Center; Salt Lake City, Utah
MWC Regular Season
Jan 12, 2004		at UNLV	W 72–67	13–3 (1–0)	Thomas & Mack Center; Las Vegas, Nevada
Jan 17, 2004		Wyoming	W 60–49	14–3 (2–0)	Jon M. Huntsman Center; Salt Lake City, Utah
Jan 19, 2004		Colorado State	W 67–49	15–3 (3–0)	Jon M. Huntsman Center; Salt Lake City, Utah
Jan 24, 2004		at New Mexico	L 54–70	15–4 (3–1)	University Arena; Albuquerque, New Mexico
Jan 26, 2004		at Air Force	L 49–62	15–5 (3–2)	Clune Arena; Colorado Springs, Colorado
Jan 31, 2004		BYU	W 64–56	16–5 (4–2)	Jon M. Huntsman Center; Salt Lake City, Utah
Feb 7, 2004		San Diego State	W 65–61	17–5 (5–2)	Jon M. Huntsman Center; Salt Lake City, Utah
Feb 9, 2004		UNLV	W 70–56	18–5 (6–2)	Jon M. Huntsman Center; Salt Lake City, Utah
Feb 14, 2004		at Colorado State	W 80–70	19–5 (7–2)	Moby Arena; Fort Collins, Colorado
Feb 16, 2004		at Wyoming	L 65–74	19–6 (7–3)	Arena-Auditorium; Laramie, Wyoming
Feb 21, 2004		Air Force	L 57–59	19–7 (7–4)	Jon M. Huntsman Center; Salt Lake City, Utah
Feb 23, 2004		New Mexico	W 73–43	20–7 (8–4)	Jon M. Huntsman Center; Salt Lake City, Utah
Mar 1, 2004		at BYU	L 57–70	20–8 (8–5)	Marriott Center; Provo, Utah
Mar 6, 2004		at San Diego State	W 66–53	21–8 (9–5)	Cox Arena; San Diego, California
MWC Tournament
Mar 11, 2004*		vs. San Diego State; Quarterfinals	W 75–69	22–8	The Pepsi Center; Denver, Colorado
Mar 12, 2004*		vs. BYU; Semifinals	W 54–51	23–8	The Pepsi Center; Denver, Colorado
Mar 13, 2004*		vs. UNLV; Championship game	W 73–70	24–8	The Pepsi Center; Denver, Colorado
NCAA Tournament
Mar 19, 2004*	(11 MW)	vs. (6 MW) No. 25 Boston College; First round	L 51–58	24–9	Bradley Center; Milwaukee, Wisconsin
*Non-conference game. ^{#}Rankings from AP Poll. (#) Tournament seedings in parentheses. MW=Midwest.
