= Billy Taylor (basketball) =

American college basketball coach

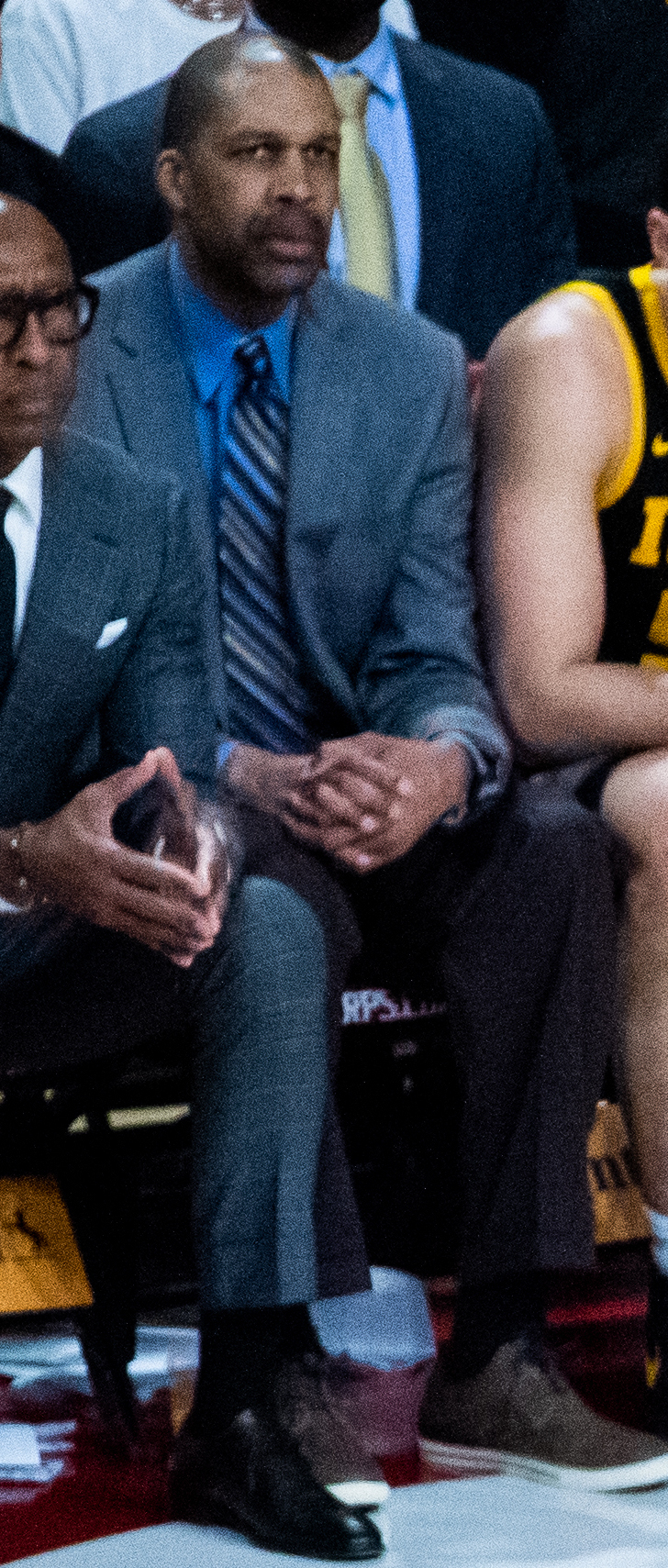
- Taylor on the Iowa sideline in a game at Williams Arena in 2020

Current position
- Title: Head Coach
- Team: Elon
- Conference: CAA
- Record: 54–77 (.412)

Biographical details
- Born: June 12, 1973 (age 53)

Playing career
- 1991–1995: Notre Dame

Coaching career (HC unless noted)
- 1998–1999: Notre Dame (assistant)
- 1999–2002: UNC Greensboro (assistant)
- 2002–2007: Lehigh
- 2007–2013: Ball State
- 2013–2016: Iowa (assistant)
- 2016–2019: Belmont Abbey
- 2019–2022: Iowa (assistant)
- 2022–present: Elon

Head coaching record
- Overall: 268–287 (.483)
- Tournaments: 0–1 (NCAA Division I); 0–1 (CBI)

Accomplishments and honors

Championships
- Patriot League regular season (2004); Patriot League tournament (2004); MAC West Division (2009)

Awards
- 2× Patriot League Coach of the Year (2003, 2004)

Billy Taylor (born June 12, 1973) is an American college basketball coach. He is the current head coach for the Elon Phoenix men's basketball team. Taylor previously served as the head men's basketball coach at Lehigh University from 2002 to 2007 and Ball State University from 2007 to 2013.

== Playing career ==
Taylor was an honor roll student and commencement speaker at West Aurora High School in Aurora, Illinois, where he played for Illinois Basketball Coaches Association (IBCA) Hall of Fame coach Gordon (Gordie) Kerkman. He was recruited by Digger Phelps to play at the University of Notre Dame, though he played under John MacLeod.

== Coaching career ==
After spending three years working for Arthur Andersen and earning his CPA, Taylor took an assistant coaching position under MacLeod at Notre Dame in 1998. One year later he followed former Lehigh head coach Fran McCaffery to UNC Greensboro.

Taylor was appointed to succeed Sal Mentesana as the 26th men's basketball head coach at Lehigh University on April 16, 2002. In his inaugural campaign, he became the all-time winningest first-year coach in Lehigh history. The Mountain Hawks surprised many by winning 16 games, including eight in the Patriot League. Their eleven-game improvement over the year before was the second best in all of Division I. For his outstanding efforts, Taylor earned the 2002–03 Patriot League Coach of the Year honors in voting by the league coaches. In 2003–04, Taylor led Lehigh to its first-ever Patriot League regular season and tournament championships, as well as a trip to the NCAA tournament. For his efforts, Taylor earned the league's Coach of the Year honor for the second time in as many seasons, becoming the first coach since Gonzaga's Mark Few to win conference coach of the year honors in each of his first two seasons as a head coach.

In 2005–06, Lehigh posted the third-most wins in school history with its 19–12 overall mark and a school-record 11 Patriot League wins.

In August 2007 Taylor was offered and took the head coaching position at Ball State University. During his six seasons at Ball State (2007–13), the Cardinals finished either first or second in the Mid-American Conference (MAC) West Division three times and advanced to the MAC Tournament semifinals twice. Taylor coached nine all-conference selections and also mentored a MAC All-Freshman Team member five straight seasons. He was fired in March 2013.

Taylor rejoined McCaffery prior to the 2013–14 season at the University of Iowa. Taylor was Hawkeyes staff for back-to-back NCAA Tournament teams (2013–14 and 2014–15). In 2014–15, Iowa advanced to the Round of 32 after posting its largest margin of victory ever in an NCAA Tournament game, a 31-point win over Davidson. The Hawkeyes produced back-to-back first-team All-Big Ten honorees and NBA Draft selections (Roy Devyn Marble in 2014 and Aaron White in 2015) with Taylor on staff. In June 2016, Taylor was hired as the head men's basketball coach at Belmont Abbey College in Belmont, North Carolina where he'd post a 49–42 record in three seasons. In May 2019, he rejoined McCaffery at Iowa.

On April 15, Taylor was named the 19th head coach in Elon basketball history, replacing Mike Schrage.

== Head coaching record ==
Record table
Season	Team	Overall	Conference	Standing	Postseason
Lehigh Mountain Hawks (Patriot League) (2002–2007)
2002–03	Lehigh	16–12	8–6	4th	
2003–04	Lehigh	20–11	10–4	T–1st	NCAA Division I Opening Round
2004–05	Lehigh	14–15	7–7	T–4th	
2005–06	Lehigh	19–12	11–3	T–2nd	
2006–07	Lehigh	12–19	7–7	T–3rd	
Lehigh:		81–69 (.540)	43–27 (.614)		
Ball State Cardinals (Mid-American Conference) (2007–2013)
2007–08	Ball State	6–24	5–11	5th (West)	
2008–09	Ball State	14–17	7–9	T–1st (West)	
2009–10	Ball State	15–15	8–8	T–2nd (West)	
2010–11	Ball State	19–13	10–6	2nd (West)	
2011–12	Ball State	15–15	6–10	T–3rd (West)	
2012–13	Ball State	15–15	8–8	3rd (West)	
Ball State:		84–99 (.459)	44–52 (.458)		
Belmont Abbey Crusaders (Conference Carolinas) (2016–2019)
2016–17	Belmont Abbey	14–15	10–10	6th	
2017–18	Belmont Abbey	12–19	5–13	9th	
2018–19	Belmont Abbey	23–8	14–4	2nd	
Belmont Abbey:		49–42 (.538)	29–27 (.518)		
Elon Phoenix (Colonial Athletic Association) (2022–2023)
2022–23	Elon	8–24	6–12	T–9th	
Elon Phoenix (Coastal Athletic Association) (2023–present)
2023–24	Elon	13–19	6–12	11th	
2024–25	Elon	17–16	8–10	T–9th	CBI First Round
2025–26	Elon	14–18	6–12	11th	
2026–27	Elon	2–0	0–0		
Elon:		54–77 (.412)	26–46 (.361)		
Total:		268–287 (.483)			
National champion Postseason invitational champion Conference regular season champion Conference regular season and conference tournament champion Division regular season champion Division regular season and conference tournament champion Conference tournament champion
