= Nick Welch (basketball) =

American basketball player and United States Air Force officer

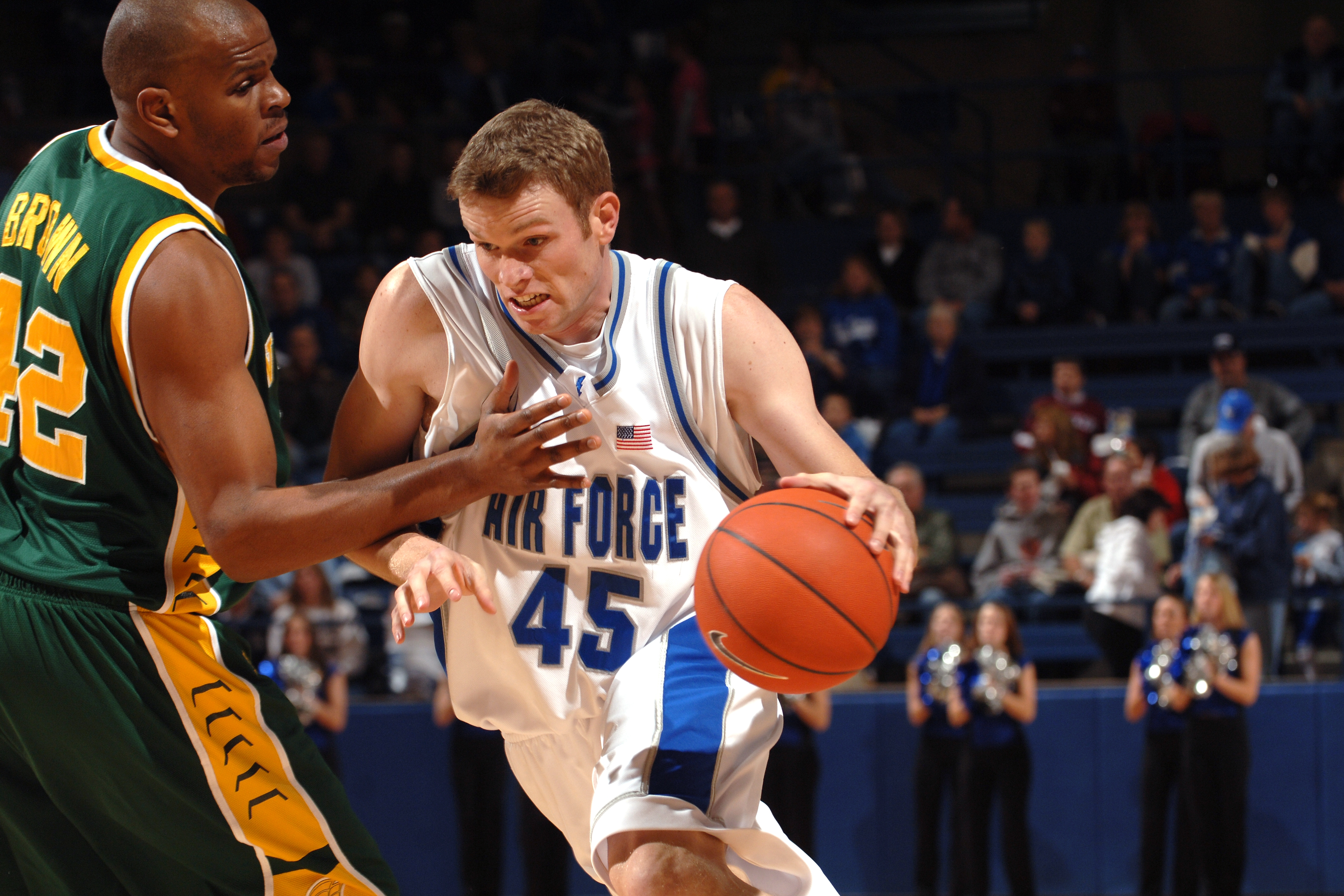
- Welch with the Air Force Academy in 2006.

Personal information
- Born: March 23, 1983 (age 43)
- Listed height: 6 ft 8 in (2.03 m)
- Listed weight: 212 lb (96 kg)

Career information
- High school: USAFA Prep School (Colorado Springs, Colorado)
- College: Air Force (2002–2007)
- NBA draft: 2007: undrafted
- Position: Center

Career highlights
- MWC co-Player of the Year (2004); AP Honorable mention All-American (2004)

Nick Welch (born March 23, 1983) is an American basketball player and United States Air Force officer, known for his All-American college career at the United States Air Force Academy.

Welch, a 6'8" center from Fort Worth, Texas, attended the United States Air Force Academy Preparatory School for high school, then the United States Air Force Academy (AFA) for college. At the AFA, Welch played the critical center position in coach Joe Scott's Princeton offense. Welch played a reserve role as a freshman, but was the catalyst of the team's attack as a sophomore in 2003–04. He averaged 11.4 points, 4.0 rebounds and 2.9 assists per game and led the Falcons to their first NCAA tournament appearance in 42 years. At the conclusion of the season, Welch was named Mountain West Conference co-player of the year (with Rafael Araújo of Brigham Young) and an honorable mention All-American by the Associated Press.

Welch played the following season for new coach Chris Mooney, averaging 12.0 points, 3.6 rebounds and 3.0 assists, but the Falcons missed postseason play. Welch suffered an ankle injury before what would have been his senior season. He was offered a medical turnback (the AFA did not grant traditional medical redshirts), and would resume his career in the 2006–07 season. As a senior, Welch averaged 9.9 points, 3.5 rebounds and 2.1 assists per game as he led the Falcons to the semifinals of the 2007 National Invitation Tournament.

After graduating from the Air Force Academy, Welch fulfilled his service commitment, stationed at Barksdale Air Force Base in Louisiana. He was named to the All-Air Force basketball team in 2008.
