= 2004 NCAA Men's Basketball All-Americans =

- Awarded for: 2003–04 NCAA Division I men's basketball season

The Consensus 2004 College Basketball All-American team, as determined by aggregating the results of four major All-American teams. To earn "consensus" status, a player must win honors from a majority of the following teams: the Associated Press, the USBWA, The Sporting News and the National Association of Basketball Coaches.

== 2004 Consensus All-America team ==
Consensus First Team
Player	Position	Class	Team
Andre Emmett	G	Senior	Texas Tech
Ryan Gomes	F	Junior	Providence
Jameer Nelson	G	Senior	Saint Joseph's
Emeka Okafor	C	Junior	Connecticut
Lawrence Roberts	F	Junior	Mississippi State

Consensus Second Team
Player	Position	Class	Team
Josh Childress	G-F	Junior	Stanford
Devin Harris	G	Junior	Wisconsin
Julius Hodge	F	Junior	NC State
Luke Jackson	F	Senior	Oregon
Blake Stepp	G	Senior	Gonzaga

== Individual All-America teams ==
All-America Team
All-America Team	First team		Second team		Third team	
All-America Team	Player	School	Player	School	Player	School
Associated Press	Josh Childress	Stanford	Andre Emmett	Texas Tech	Chris Duhon	Duke
Associated Press	Ryan Gomes	Providence	Devin Harris	Wisconsin	John Lucas III	Oklahoma State
Associated Press	Jameer Nelson	Saint Joseph's	Julius Hodge	NC State	Rashad McCants	North Carolina
Associated Press	Emeka Okafor	Connecticut	Luke Jackson	Oregon	Wayne Simien	Kansas
Associated Press	Lawrence Roberts	Mississippi State	Blake Stepp	Gonzaga	Hakim Warrick	Syracuse
USBWA	Andre Emmett	Texas Tech	Josh Childress	Stanford	No third team	
USBWA	Ryan Gomes	Providence	Devin Harris	Wisconsin	No third team	
USBWA	Jameer Nelson	Saint Joseph's	Julius Hodge	NC State	No third team	
USBWA	Emeka Okafor	Connecticut	John Lucas III	Oklahoma State	No third team	
USBWA	Lawrence Roberts	Mississippi State	Blake Stepp	Gonzaga	No third team	
NABC	Josh Childress	Stanford	Chris Duhon	Duke	Matt Freije	Vanderbilt
NABC	Andre Emmett	Texas Tech	Ryan Gomes	Providence	Luke Jackson	Oregon
NABC	Jameer Nelson	Saint Joseph's	Devin Harris	Wisconsin	JJ Redick	Duke
NABC	Emeka Okafor	Connecticut	Julius Hodge	NC State	Hakim Warrick	Syracuse
NABC	Lawrence Roberts	Mississippi State	Blake Stepp	Gonzaga	Delonte West	Saint Joseph's
Sporting News	Ryan Gomes	Providence	Andre Emmett	Texas Tech	Andre Barrett	Seton Hall
Sporting News	Julius Hodge	NC State	Devin Harris	Wisconsin	Josh Childress	Stanford
Sporting News	Luke Jackson	Oregon	Lawrence Roberts	Mississippi State	Matt Freije	Vanderbilt
Sporting News	Jameer Nelson	Saint Joseph's	Blake Stepp	Gonzaga	Rashad McCants	North Carolina
Sporting News	Emeka Okafor	Connecticut	Hakim Warrick	Syracuse	Delonte West	Saint Joseph's

AP Honorable Mention:

- Tony Allen, Oklahoma State
- Rafael Araújo, Brigham Young
- Andre Barrett, Seton Hall
- Odell Bradley, IUPUI
- Darren Brooks, Southern Illinois
- Dee Brown, Illinois
- Antonio Burks, Memphis
- Taylor Coppenrath, Vermont
- Erik Daniels, Kentucky
- Miah Davis, Pacific
- Paul Davis, Michigan State
- Greg Davis, Troy
- Luol Deng, Duke
- Ike Diogu, Arizona State
- B. J. Elder, Georgia Tech
- Gerald Fitch, Kentucky
- Luis Flores, Manhattan
- Jason Forte, Brown
- Matt Freije, Vanderbilt
- Francisco García, Louisville
- Danny Gathings, High Point
- Ben Gordon, Connecticut
- David Harrison, Colorado
- David Hawkins, Temple
- Kris Humphries, Minnesota
- LeRoy Hurd, Texas–San Antonio
- Andre Iguodala, Arizona
- Arthur Johnson, Missouri
- Domonic Jones, VCU
- Carl Krauser, Pittsburgh
- Jaime Lloreda, LSU
- Bryant Matthews, Virginia Tech
- Sean May, North Carolina
- Attarius Norwood, Mississippi Valley State
- Dylan Page, Wisconsin–Milwaukee
- Chris Paul, Wake Forest
- Tim Pickett, Florida State
- JJ Redick, Duke
- Anthony Roberson, Florida
- Ron Robinson, Central Connecticut State
- Austen Rowland, Lehigh
- Romain Sato, Xavier
- Alvin Snow, Eastern Washington
- Kirk Snyder, Nevada
- Chris Thomas, Notre Dame
- Ronny Turiaf, Gonzaga
- Cuthbert Victor, Murray State
- Zakee Wadood, East Tennessee State
- Nick Welch, Air Force
- Mike Wells, Western Kentucky
- Delonte West, Saint Joseph's
- Mike Williams, Western Michigan
- Shelden Williams, Duke
- Thurman Zimmerman, South Carolina State
