= Austen Rowland =

American basketball player and coach

Personal information
- Born: July 30, 1981 (age 45) Hyattsville, Maryland, U.S.
- Listed height: 6 ft 1 in (1.85 m)
- Listed weight: 180 lb (82 kg)

Career information
- High school: St. Vincent Pallotti (Laurel, Maryland)
- College: Delaware (1999–2002); Lehigh (2003–2004)
- NBA draft: 2004: undrafted
- Playing career: 2004–2019
- Position: Point guard
- Coaching career: 2016–2020

Career history

Playing
- 2004–2005: Saar-Pfalz Braves
- 2005–2006: Science City Jena
- 2006–2007: Ratiopharm Ulm
- 2007–2008: Gladiators Treves
- 2008–2009: BSC Fürstenfeld Panthers
- 2009: Giessen 46ers
- 2009–2010: Ratiopharm Ulm
- 2010–2011: ESSM Le Portel
- 2011–2012: ALM Évreux
- 2012–2013: S.O.M.B.
- 2013–2014: Orchies
- 2014–2016: Korikobrat
- 2016: S.O.M.B.
- 2017: La Charité
- 2018: Étoile Charleville-Mézières
- 2018–2019: La Charité

Coaching
- 2016–2017: Lehigh (assistant)
- 2019–2020: Hamburg Towers (assistant)

Career highlights
- AP honorable mention All-American (2004); Patriot League Player of the Year (2004); First-team All-Patriot League (2004); Patriot League tournament MVP (2004)

Austen Rowland (born July 30, 1981) is an American retired professional basketball player. His 15-year career spanned from 2004 to 2019 with stops in Austria, Finland, France, and Germany. In college, Rowland was an honorable mention All-American and the 2004 Patriot League Player of the Year as a senior at Lehigh. Rowland has also been an assistant coach, first at Lehigh for the 2016–17 season and then with the German professional team Hamburg Towers in 2019–20. In his post-basketball life he is a licensed real estate professional in the Bowie, Maryland area.

== Playing career ==
=== College ===
==== Delaware (1999–2002) ====
A native of Hyattsville, Maryland, Rowland began his college career at the University of Delaware in 1999. He played three seasons for the Fightin' Blue Hens, averaging 4.1, 11.6, and 9.8 points per game, respectively. While Delaware had success during his tenure, Rowland made the decision to transfer to Lehigh after his junior year in 2001–02. He had to redshirt the 2002–03 season, and then became eligible to play his final collegiate season in 2003–04.

==== Lehigh (2003–2004) ====
Rowland made an immense impact in his lone season at Lehigh. He averaged 15.5 points, 4.2 rebounds, 4.9 assists, and 1.9 steals per game while leading the Mountain Hawks to their first-ever Patriot League regular season and conference tournament championships. He led the league in games played (31), field goals made (167) and attempted (413), points per game, and total points (480). Rowland also finished in the top five in 14 other statistical categories. He was named the 2004 Patriot League tournament's Most Valuable Player after leading Lehigh to an automatic berth in the NCAA tournament. They would go on to the lose the 16-seed play-in game to Florida A&M.

For his outstanding personal season, Rowland was named to the All-Patriot League first team and was its player of the year, the first from Lehigh to earn that honor. He earned an Associated Press honorable mention nod as an All-American. In 2015, he was selected to be on the Patriot League's 25th Anniversary Team as one of the greatest 25 players in league history to that point.

=== Professional ===
Rowland went undrafted in the ensuing 2004 NBA draft. He instead emabarked upon a professional career that spanned 15 seasons and took him to numerous countries around the world. His professional single game career highs were 31 points (three times), 18 assists (April 21, 2007), and 6 steals (two times). After the 2018–19 season Rowland retired from playing professional basketball.

== Coaching career and post-basketball ==
On two occasions Rowland served as an assistant basketball coach. The first came in 2016–17 when he returned to his alma mater to assist head coach Brett Reed at Lehigh. He had felt he was done with his playing career at that time but wanted to stay with the game he loved. After just season, Rowland left and returned to a professional playing career. His second stint in coaching came just after his official retirement in 2019. He joined Germany's Hamburg Towers for the 2019–20 season in which they finished 3–17 and in 17th place in the Basketball Bundesliga. Rowland left basketball after that and has since become a licensed real estate professional back in his home state of Maryland.
