= Joe Scott (basketball coach) =

American college basketball coach (born 1965)

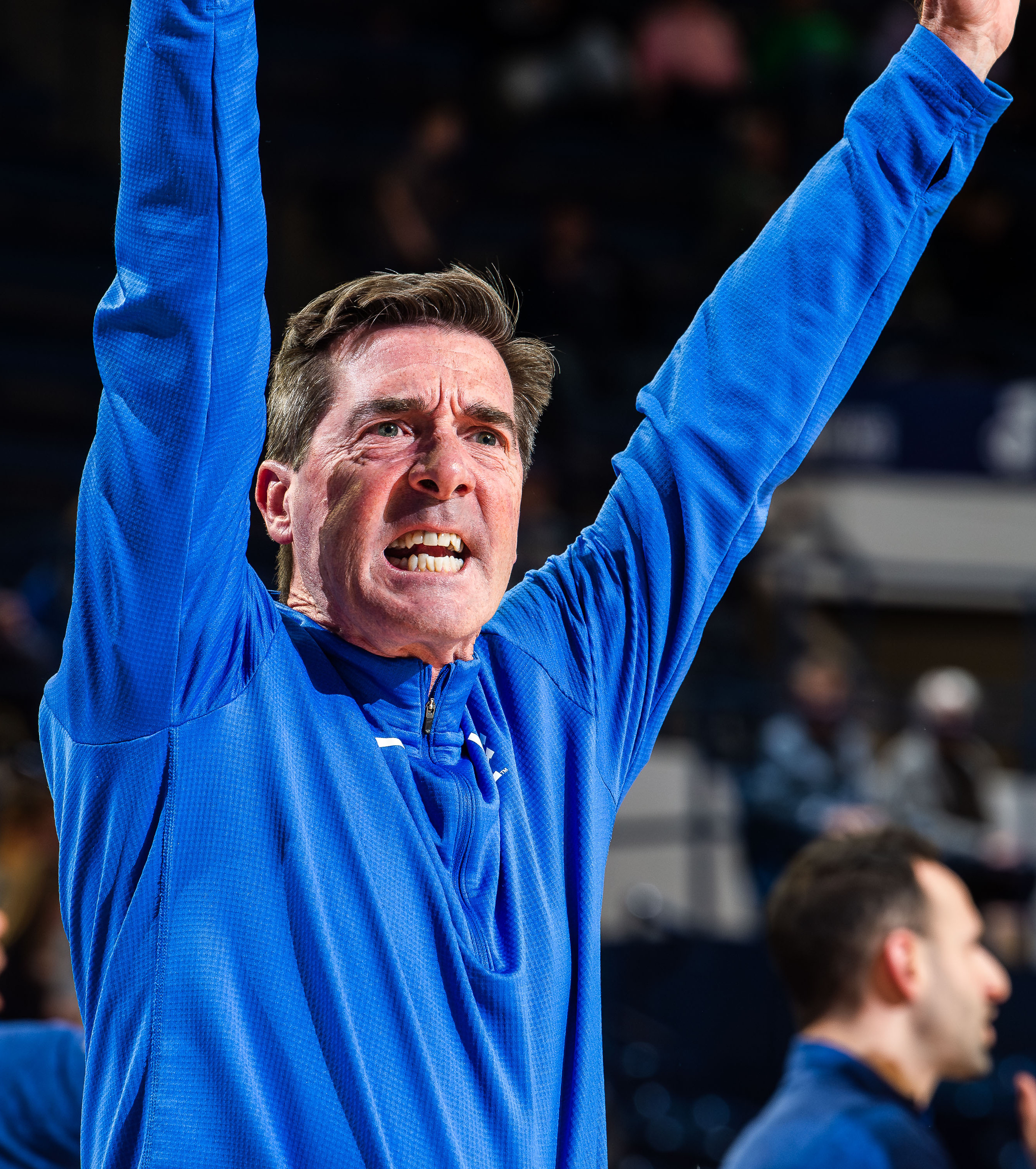
- Scott in 2023

Biographical details
- Born: July 28, 1965 (age 61); Toms River, New Jersey, U.S.

Playing career
- 1983–1987: Princeton
- Position: Point guard

Coaching career (HC unless noted)
- 1991–1992: Monmouth (assistant)
- 1992–2000: Princeton (assistant)
- 2000–2004: Air Force
- 2004–2007: Princeton
- 2007–2016: Denver
- 2016–2018: Holy Cross (assistant)
- 2018–2020: Georgia (assistant)
- 2020–2026: Air Force

Head coaching record
- Overall: 281–360 (.438)
- Tournaments: 0–1 (NCAA Division I); 1–1 (NIT)

Accomplishments and honors

Championships
- Mountain West regular season (2004); WAC regular season (2013)

Awards
- MWC Coach of the Year (2004)

Joseph Winston Scott (born July 28, 1965) is an American college basketball coach who was most recently the head coach at Air Force. Scott previously was head coach at Air Force once before, as well as at Princeton and Denver.

== Early life and education ==
Growing up on Pelican Island near Toms River, New Jersey, Scott played baseball, basketball and football at Toms River High School East, where he set the school's basketball career scoring record. Scott played at point guard in high school and set a school record for career basketball points with 1,550.

Scott served as captain of the 1986–87 Princeton Tigers men's basketball team. As a player in the mid-1980s, Scott learned the "Princeton offense," a methodical system that seeks high-percentage shots by passing until the right opportunity rather than a fast-pace offense with more shots. As a result, Scott has frequently instituted a deliberate pace as a coach, often coaching the slowest-paced team in the country.

In 1990, Scott earned his J.D. degree at Notre Dame Law School and became a personal injury lawyer at New Jersey law firm Ribis, Graham, & Carter. However, he resigned after one year, believing that the profession prioritized billing hours over helping clients.

== Coaching career ==
=== Early coaching career (1991–2000) ===
After being an assistant coach at Monmouth University for the 1991–92 season, Scott returned to Princeton as an assistant coach, first under Pete Carril from 1992 to 1996 and Bill Carmody from 1996 to 2000. Scott's time as assistant coach included a 1996 win over defending champion UCLA in the NCAA Tournament and a no. 7 ranking and another second-round NCAA appearance in 1998. The 1998 team earned a No. 5 seed in the NCAA Tournament, the highest ranking ever for an Ivy League school.

=== First stint at Air Force (2000–2004) ===
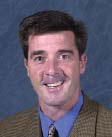
Scott during his first stint at Air Force

From 2000 to 2004, Scott was head coach at Air Force. Scott accrued a 51–63 record, starting with an 8–21 record but improving each season. In 2003–04, Scott led Air Force to a 22–7 record, Mountain West Conference regular season title, and an at-large NCAA tournament appearance. Scott earned Mountain West Coach of the Year honors and finished fourth in polling for AP Coach of the Year.

=== Princeton (2004–2007) ===
Scott succeeded John Thompson III as the head coach at Princeton in 2004 and had a 38–45 record through three seasons. The team finished sixth in the Ivy League in 2004–05, his first season, with a 6–8 record, before rebounding to a 10–4 mark good for second place in the conference in 2005–06. Scott Greenman, a senior point guard, became Scott's first and only First-Team All-Ivy player in 2006.

=== Denver (2007–2016) ===
Scott then served as head coach at the University of Denver from 2007 to 2016. During these nine seasons, Denver went 146–132 and had one postseason appearance, in the NIT, in the same year Denver shared the regular season WAC title in its lone season in the conference. On March 11, 2016, Denver fired Scott with two years remaining on his contract. An associate vice chancellor at Denver commented: "We want to get to the NCAA Tournament in men’s basketball. We looked at what Joe’s team had done over the nine years and decided it was time to make a transition. Postseason success had not occurred."

=== Holy Cross and Georgia assistant (2016–2020) ===
On May 23, 2016, Scott became an assistant coach at Holy Cross for his second stint working under Bill Carmody, having previously been an assistant under Carmody at Princeton from 1996 to 2000. After two seasons with Holy Cross, Scott was hired by Tom Crean to be an assistant at the University of Georgia.

=== Second stint at Air Force (2020–2026) ===
On March 31, 2020, Scott returned to Air Force for his second stint as head coach. On January 17, 2026, Scott was suspended indefinitely amid an investigation into the treatment of players. On February 20, Air Force announced that Scott and the school had mutually parted ways.

== Head coaching record ==
Record table
| Season | Team | Overall | Conference | Standing | Postseason |
|---|---|---|---|---|---|
Air Force Falcons (Mountain West Conference) (2000–2004)
| 2000–01 | Air Force | 8–20 | 3–11 | 8th | |
| 2001–02 | Air Force | 9–19 | 3–11 | T–7th | |
| 2002–03 | Air Force | 12–16 | 3–11 | 8th | |
| 2003–04 | Air Force | 22–7 | 12–2 | 1st | NCAA Division I Round of 64 |
Princeton Tigers (Ivy League) (2004–2007)
| 2004–05 | Princeton | 15–13 | 6–8 | 6th | |
| 2005–06 | Princeton | 12–15 | 10–4 | 2nd | |
| 2006–07 | Princeton | 11–17 | 2–12 | 8th | |
| Princeton: | | 38–45 (.458) | 18–24 (.429) | | |
Denver Pioneers (Sun Belt Conference) (2007–2012)
| 2007–08 | Denver | 11–19 | 7–11 | 5th (West) | |
| 2008–09 | Denver | 15–16 | 9–9 | 3rd (West) | |
| 2009–10 | Denver | 19–13 | 10–8 | T–3rd (West) | |
| 2010–11 | Denver | 13–17 | 9–7 | 3rd (West) | |
| 2011–12 | Denver | 22–9 | 11–5 | 2nd | |
Denver Pioneers (Western Athletic Conference) (2012–2013)
| 2012–13 | Denver | 22–10 | 16–2 | T–1st | NIT Second Round |
Denver Pioneers (Summit League) (2013–2016)
| 2013–14 | Denver | 16–15 | 8–6 | 4th | |
| 2014–15 | Denver | 12–18 | 6–10 | T–6th | |
| 2015–16 | Denver | 16–15 | 7–9 | 6th | |
| Denver: | | 146–132 (.525) | 83–67 (.553) | | |
Air Force Falcons (Mountain West Conference) (2020–2026)
| 2020–21 | Air Force | 5–20 | 3–17 | 10th | |
| 2021–22 | Air Force | 11–18 | 4–13 | 10th | |
| 2022–23 | Air Force | 14–18 | 5–13 | 10th | |
| 2023–24 | Air Force | 9–22 | 2–16 | T–10th | |
| 2024–25 | Air Force | 4–28 | 1–19 | 11th | |
| 2025–26 | Air Force | 3–14 | 0–6 | Fired | |
| Air Force: | | 97–183 (.346) | 36–119 (.232) | | |
| Total: | | 281–360 (.438) | | | |
National champion Postseason invitational champion Conference regular season champion Conference regular season and conference tournament champion Division regular season champion Division regular season and conference tournament champion Conference tournament champion

== Personal life ==
Scott's wife, Leah Spraragen, is a 1992 Princeton graduate who played at point guard on the Princeton Tigers women's basketball team. They have two children, one of whom, Jack, plays basketball at Princeton.
