= 2006 Mountain West Conference men's basketball tournament =

- Classification: Division I
- Season: 2005–06
- Teams: 9
- Site: Pepsi Center; Denver, Colorado
- Champions: San Diego State (2nd title)
- MVP: Marcus Slaughter (SDSU)

2005–06 Mountain West Conference men's basketball standings
	Conf.				Overall
Team	W		L	PCT	W		L	PCT
San Diego State †	13	–	3	.813	24	–	9	.727
Air Force	12	–	4	.750	24	–	7	.774
BYU	12	–	4	.750	20	–	9	.690
UNLV	10	–	6	.625	17	–	13	.567
New Mexico	8	–	8	.500	17	–	13	.567
Utah	6	–	10	.375	14	–	15	.483
Wyoming	5	–	11	.313	14	–	18	.438
Colorado State	4	–	12	.250	16	–	15	.516
TCU	4	–	12	.250	16	–	15	.516
† 2006 Mountain West tournament winner Rankings from AP Poll

The 2006 Mountain West Conference men's basketball tournament was played at Pepsi Center in Denver, Colorado from March 7–11, 2006. Regular season league champion San Diego State held off Wyoming, who were at the time the lowest seed to ever make the championship game (7th), 69–64 in overtime to claim the Mountain West Conference tournament title and the league's automatic bid to the NCAA Tournament. SDSU became the first school in the league's brief history to win multiple tournament titles (2002 & 2006)

With the expansion and addition of TCU to the Mountain West Conference at the start of the 2005–06 athletic year, the conference tournament format was revised to include a play-in game between the 8th and 9th place teams, with the winner advancing to play the regular season MWC champion in the quarterfinals.

It is, to date, the last MWC Tournament played in Denver. In 2007 the tournament returned to the Thomas & Mack Center in Las Vegas, where it had previously been from 2000 to 2003.

== Tournament Bracket ==
The tournament took place March 7–11.

First round
8	Colorado State	64
9	Texas Christian	60

Quarterfinals
1	San Diego State	64
8	Colorado St.	52
4	UNLV	65
5	New Mexico	64
2	Air Force	55
7	Wyoming	57
3	BYU	70
6	Utah	74

Semifinals
1	San Diego St.	63
4	UNLV	60
7	Wyoming	60
6	Utah	47

Championship
1	San Diego St.	69
7	Wyoming	64
