= 2004 Mountain West Conference men's basketball tournament =

- Classification: Division I
- Season: 2003–04
- Site: Pepsi Center; Denver, Colorado
- Champions: Utah (1st title)
- MVP: Nick Jacobson (Utah)

2003–04 Mountain West Conference men's basketball standings
	Conf.				Overall
Team	W		L	PCT	W		L	PCT
Air Force	12	–	2	.857	22	–	7	.759
BYU	10	–	4	.714	21	–	9	.700
Utah †	9	–	5	.643	24	–	9	.727
UNLV	7	–	7	.500	18	–	13	.581
New Mexico	5	–	9	.357	14	–	14	.500
San Diego State	5	–	9	.357	14	–	16	.467
Wyoming	4	–	10	.286	11	–	17	.393
Colorado State	4	–	10	.286	13	–	16	.448
† 2004 Mountain West tournament winner Rankings from AP Poll

The 2004 Mountain West Conference men's basketball tournament was played at Pepsi Center in Denver, Colorado, from March 10–13, 2004. Third-seeded Utah defeated UNLV, which lost its third consecutive tournament title game (all by 3 points or less), 73–70 in the championship game to win the Mountain West Conference tournament and the league's NCAA Tournament automatic bid.

This marked the first time in league history the tournament was held in a venue other than Las Vegas' Thomas and Mack Center.

== Bracket ==
Quarterfinals; March 10
2	BYU	79
7	Wyoming	74
3	Utah	75
6	San Diego State	69
1	#25 Air Force	48
8	Colorado State	60
4	UNLV	55
5	New Mexico	53

Semifinals; March 12
2	BYU	51
3	Utah	54
8	Colorado State	73
4	UNLV	80

Finals; March 13
3	Utah	73
4	UNLV	70
