= Mountain West Conference Men's Basketball Player of the Year =

Collegiate basketball award since 1999

- Awarded for: the most outstanding basketball player in Mountain West Conference
- Country: United States

History
- First award: 2000
- Most recent: Mason Falslev, Utah State

The Mountain West Conference Men's Basketball Player of the Year is an award given to the Mountain West Conference's most outstanding player. The award was first given following the 1999–2000 season, the first year of the conference's existence. As of 2026, no player has received the award multiple times. Two winners of the conference award were consensus national players of the year: Andrew Bogut of Utah (2005) and Jimmer Fredette of BYU (2011).

Among current conference members, New Mexico has the most awards with five. Due largely to major membership turnover in 2026, it is the only current member with more than one recipient. Other current conference members with a winner are Air Force, Nevada, and San Jose State. Two charter all-sports members are yet to have a winner—UNLV and Wyoming. Four other schools without a recipient are recent arrivals in the conference. Grand Canyon played its first MW season in 2025–26, and Hawaiʻi, UC Davis, and UTEP are playing their first MW seasons in 2026–27. Two former conference members claimed five awards—BYU and San Diego State—but BYU left the MW in 2011 and San Diego State left in 2026.

== Key ==
†	Co-Players of the Year
*	Awarded a national player of the year award that same season: Oscar Robertson Trophy (1958–59 to present); Naismith College Player of the Year (1968–69 to present); John R. Wooden Award (1976–77 to present)
Player (X)	Denotes the number of times the player has been awarded the Mountain West Player of the Year award at that point

== Winners ==
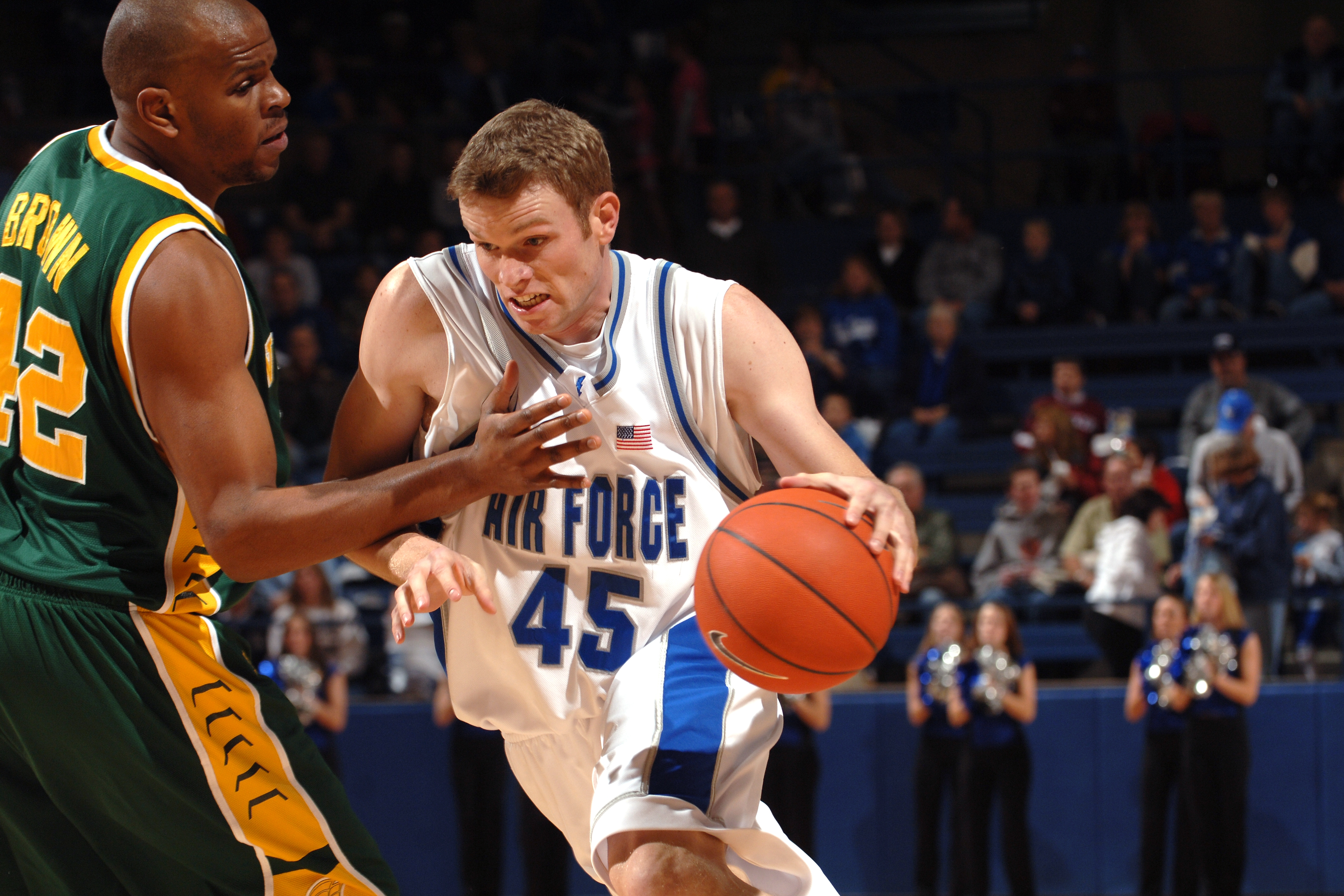
Nick Welch, Air Force, 2004

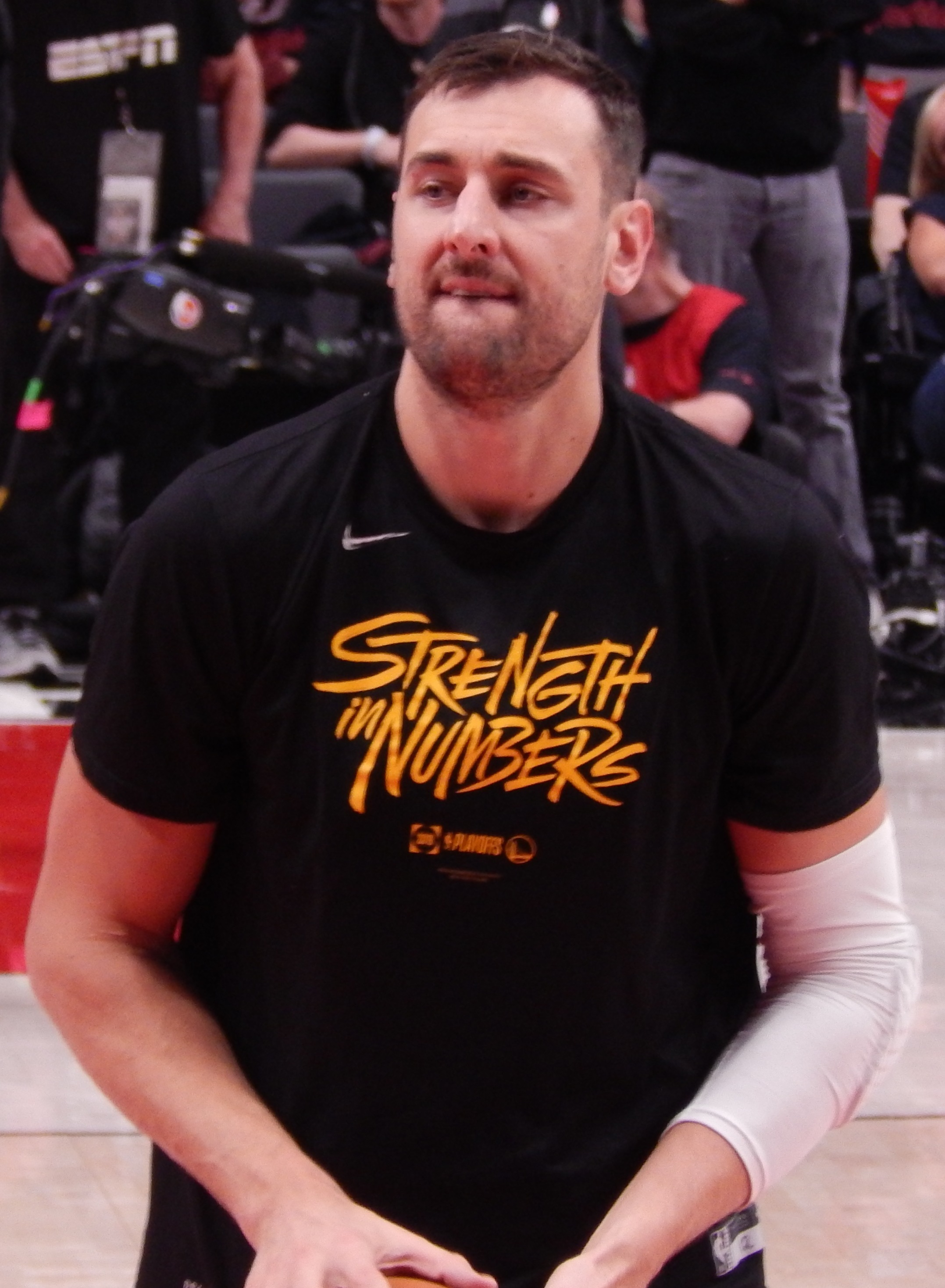
Andrew Bogut, Utah, 2005

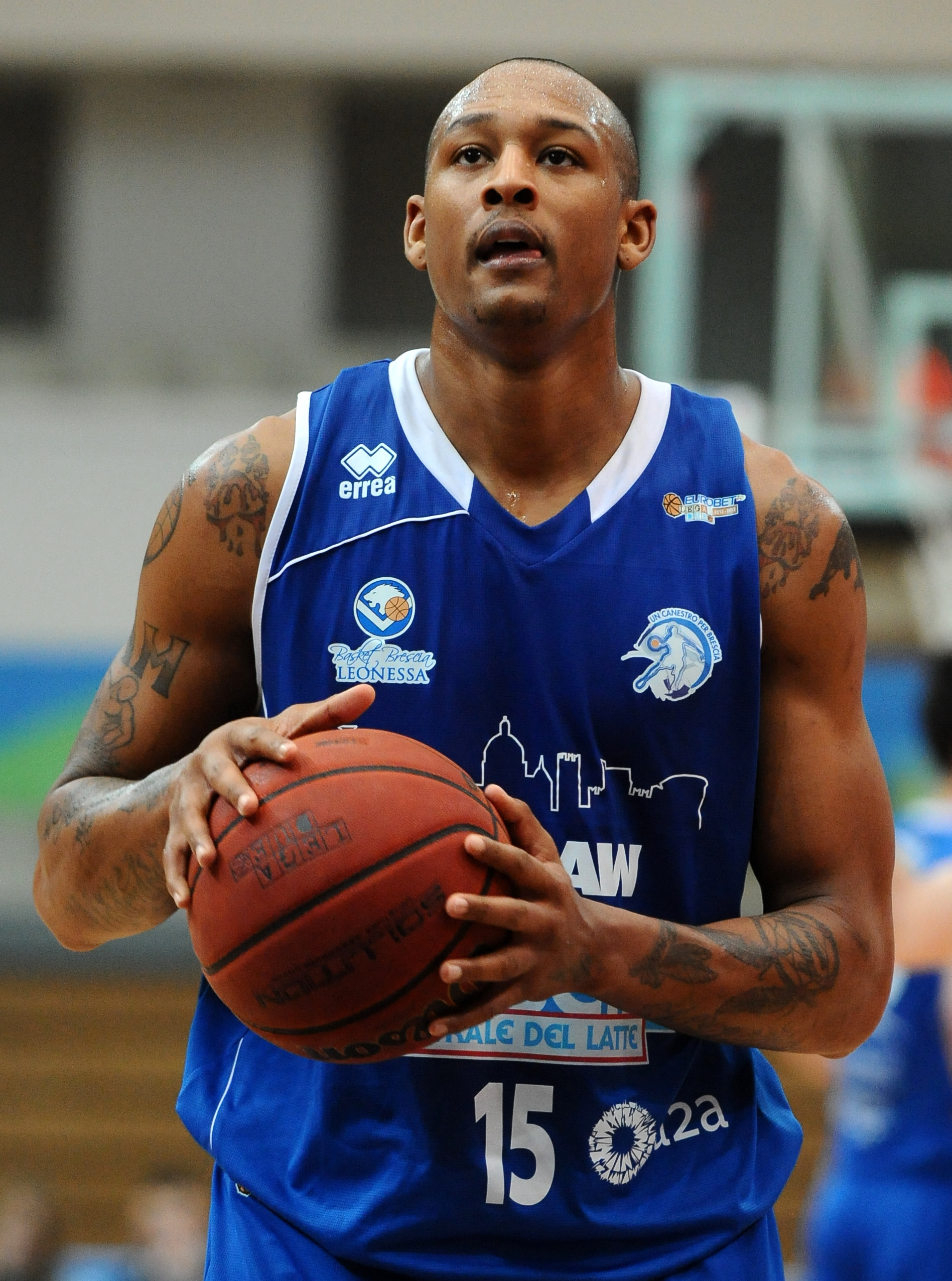
J. R. Giddens, New Mexico, 2008

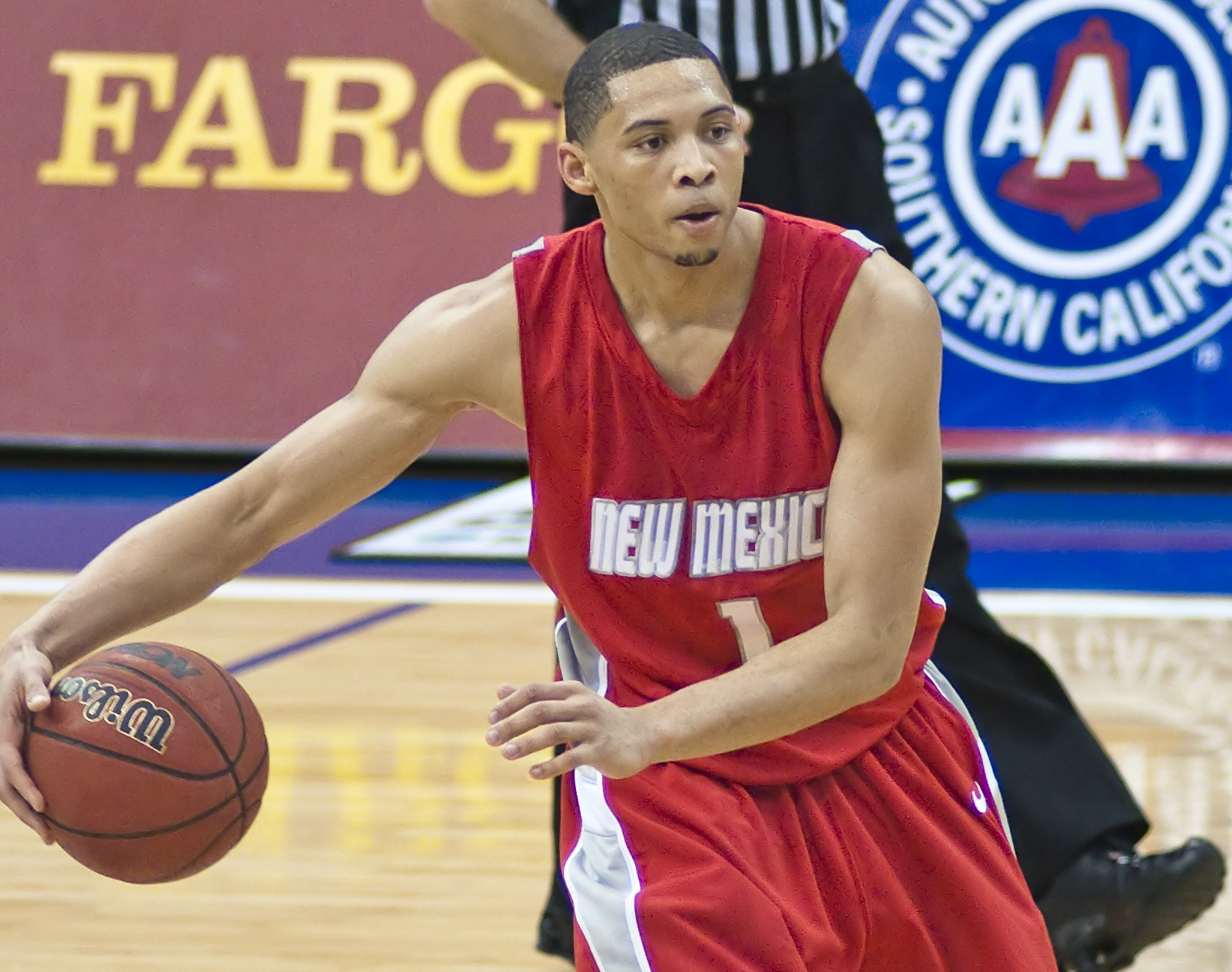
Darington Hobson, New Mexico, 2010

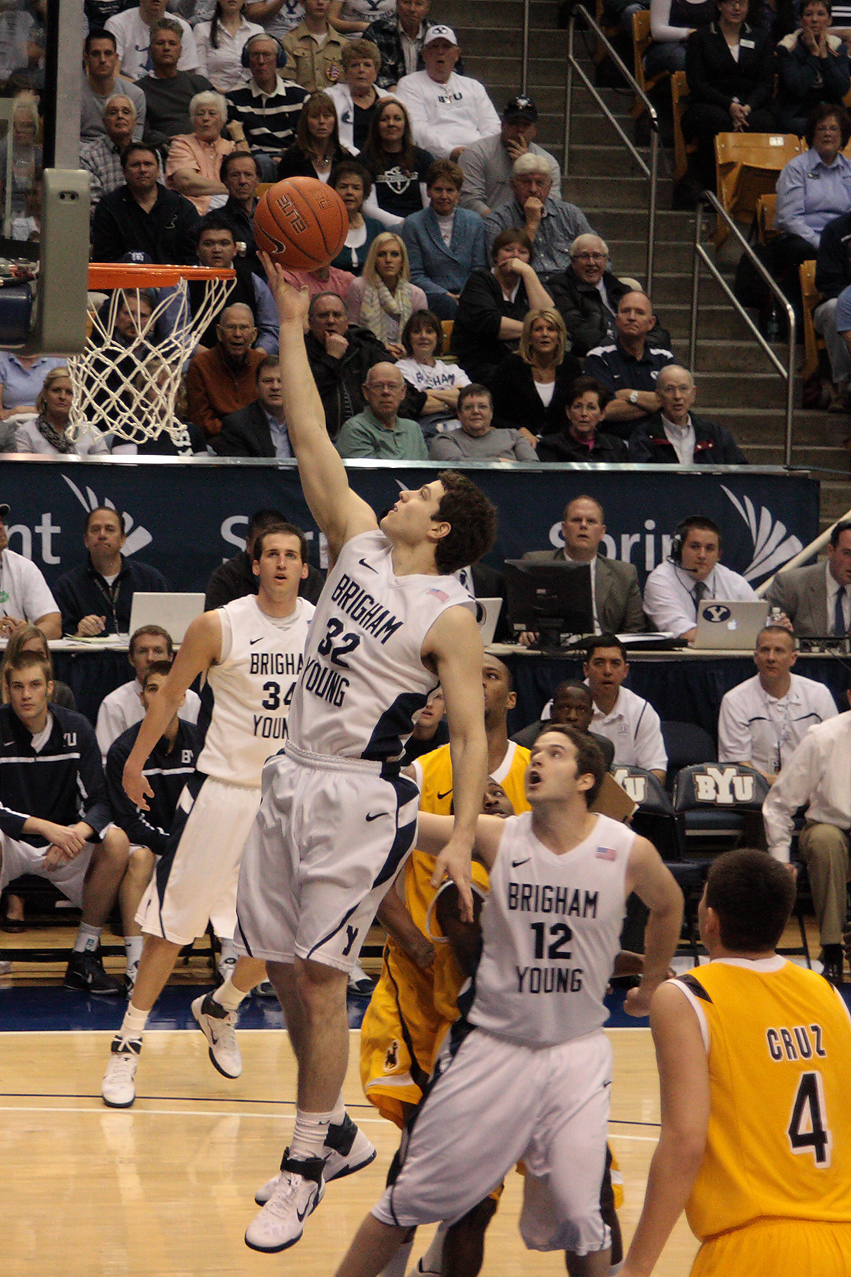
Jimmer Fredette, BYU, 2011

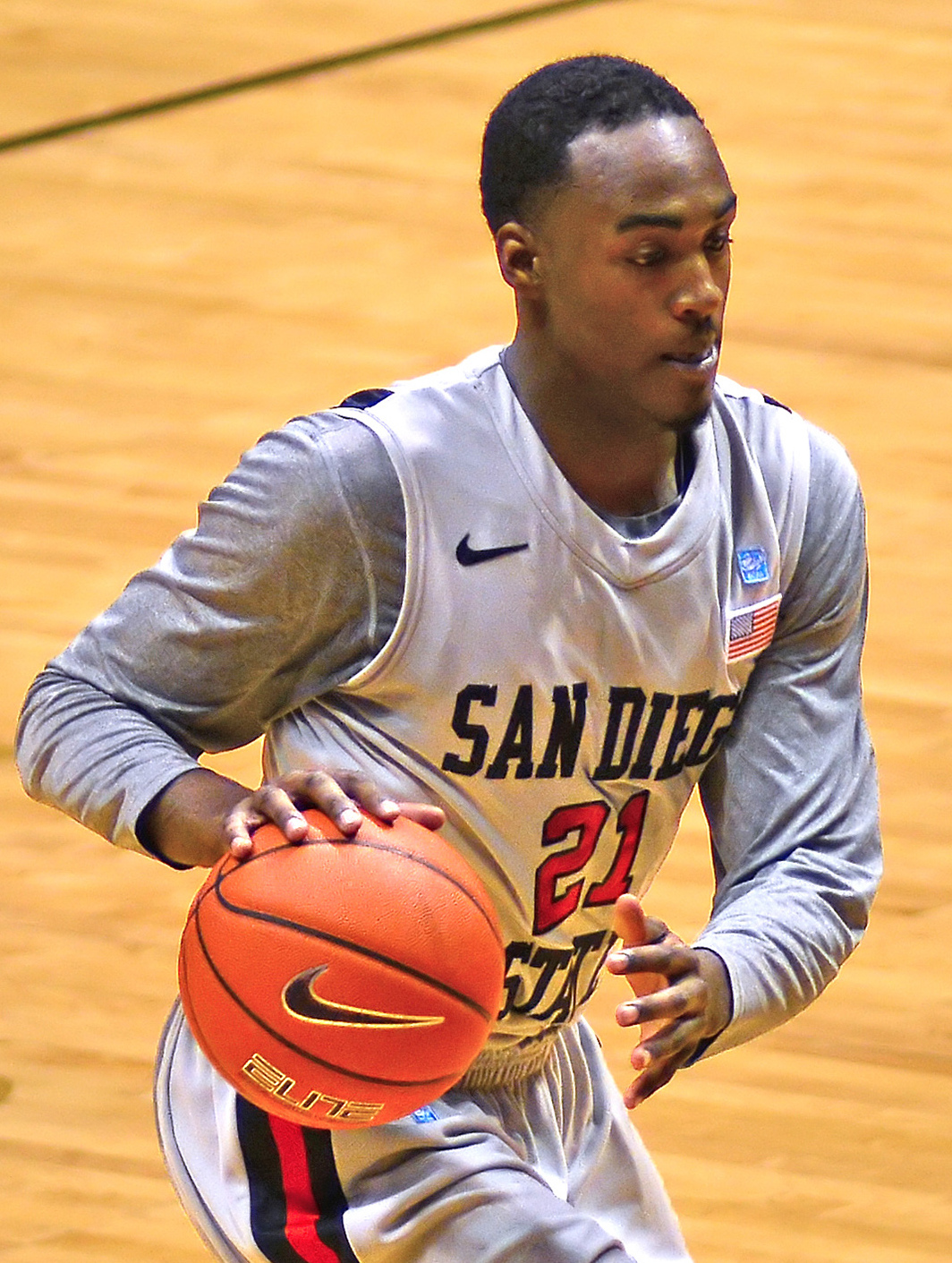
Jamaal Franklin, San Diego State, 2012

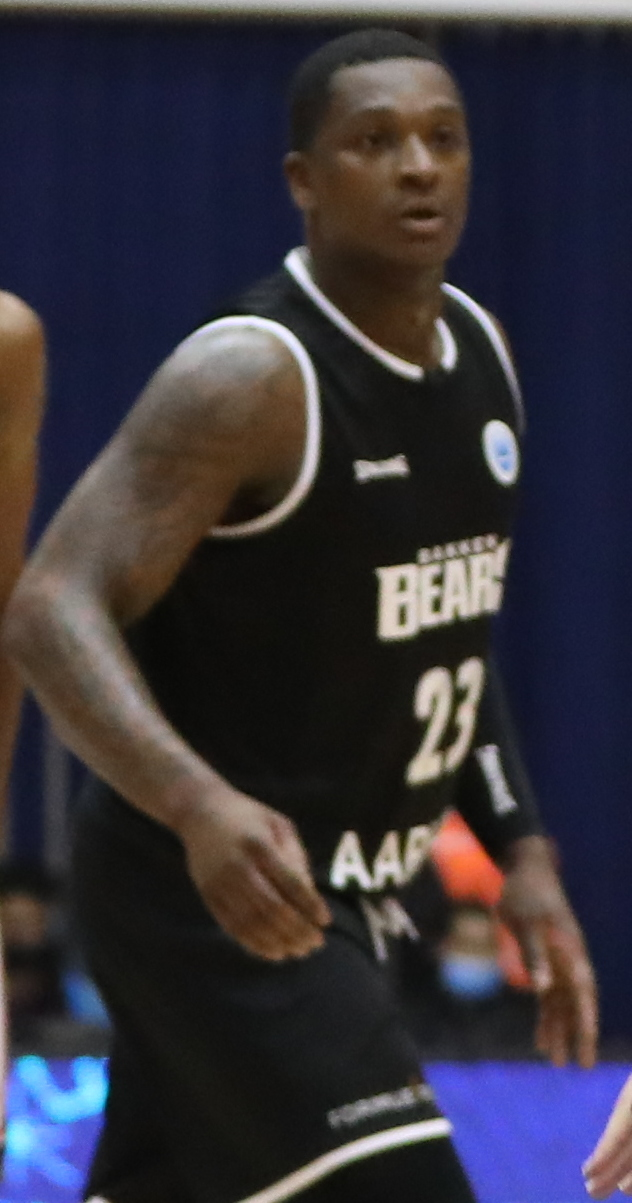
Marvelle Harris, Fresno State, 2016

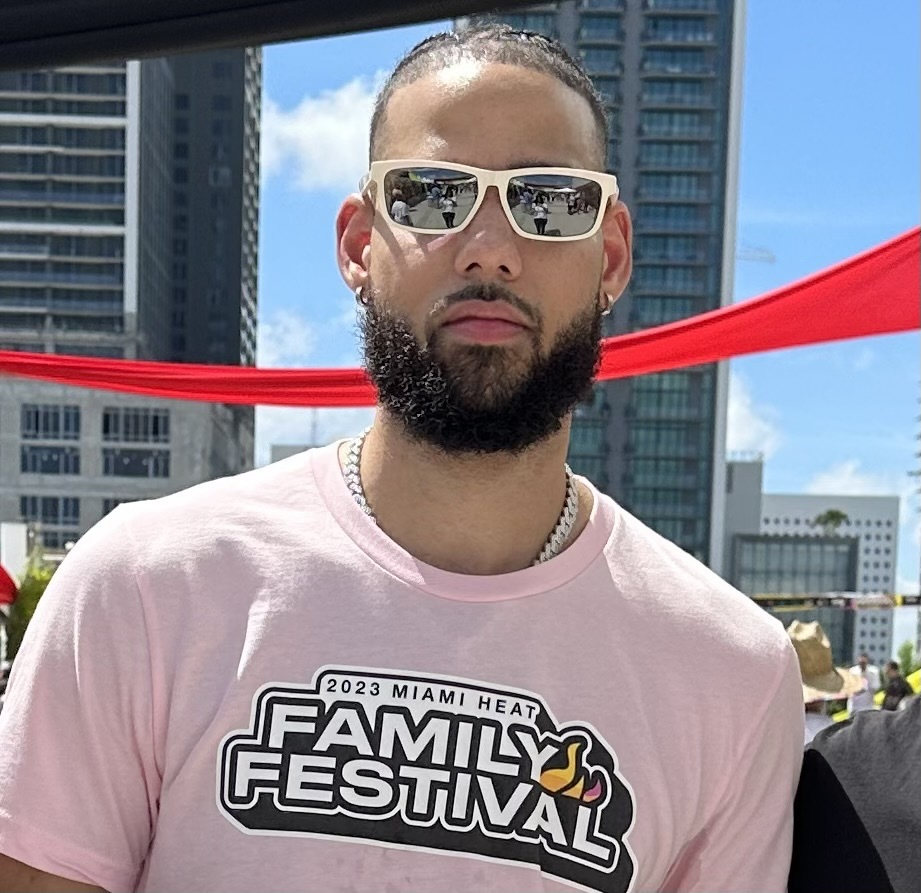
Caleb Martin, Nevada, 2018

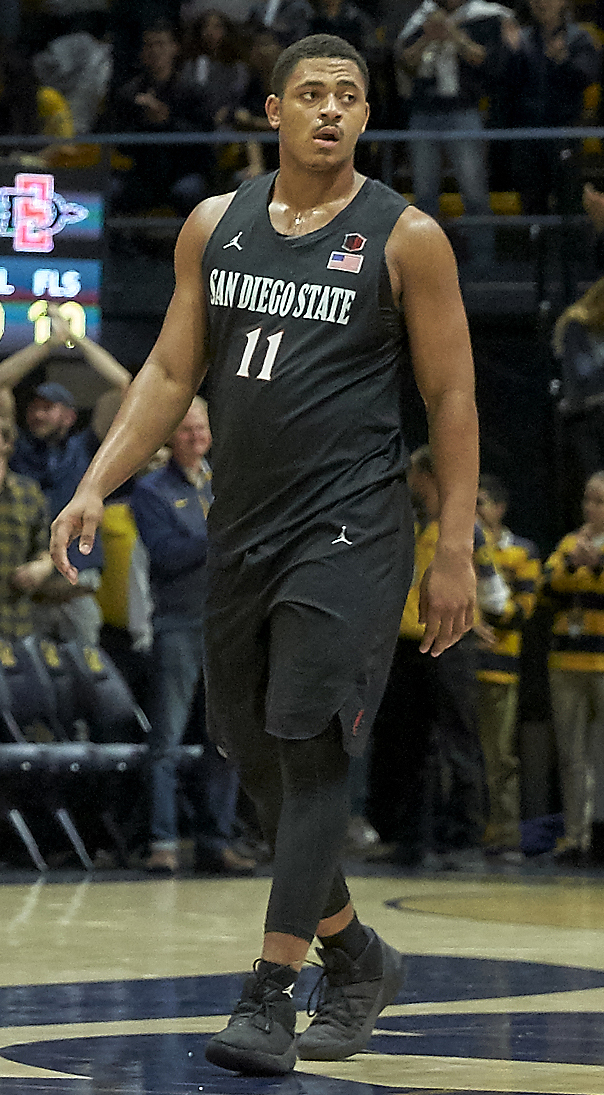
Matt Mitchell, San Diego State, 2021

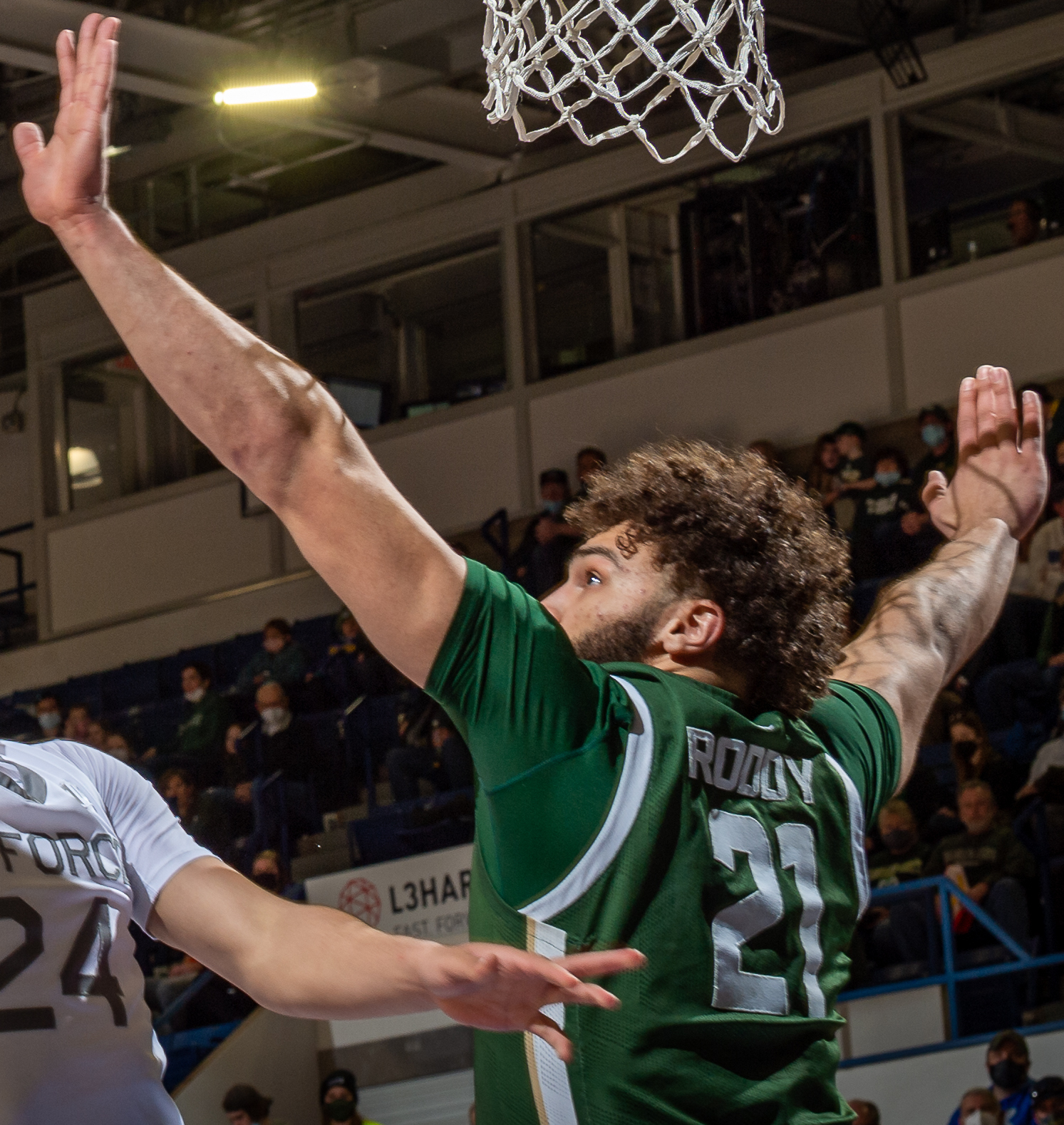
David Roddy, Colorado State, 2022

Season	Player	School	Position	Class	Reference
1999–00	Alex Jensen	Utah	F	Senior	
2000–01	Mekeli Wesley	BYU	F	Senior	
2001–02	Britton Johnsen	Utah	F	Junior	
2002–03	Ruben Douglas	New Mexico	PG/SG	Senior	
2003–04^{†}	Rafael Araújo	BYU	C	Senior	
2003–04^{†}	Nick Welch	Air Force	C	Sophomore	
2004–05	Andrew Bogut*	Utah	PF/C	Sophomore	
2005–06	Brandon Heath	San Diego State	SG	Junior	
2006–07	Keena Young	BYU	G	Senior	
2007–08^{†}	Lee Cummard	BYU	SF	Junior	
2007–08^{†}	J. R. Giddens	New Mexico	SG	Senior	
2008–09	Luke Nevill	Utah	C	Senior	
2009–10	Darington Hobson	New Mexico	SF	Junior	
2010–11	Jimmer Fredette*	BYU	PG	Senior	
2011–12	Jamaal Franklin	San Diego State	SG	Sophomore	
2012–13	Kendall Williams	New Mexico	SG	Junior	
2013–14	Xavier Thames	San Diego State	SG	Senior	
2014–15	Derrick Marks	Boise State	SG	Senior	
2015–16	Marvelle Harris	Fresno State	SG	Senior	
2016–17	Gian Clavell	Colorado State	SG	Senior	
2017–18	Caleb Martin	Nevada	SF	Junior	
2018–19	Sam Merrill	Utah State	PG	Junior	
2019–20	Malachi Flynn	San Diego State	PG	Junior	
2020–21	Matt Mitchell	San Diego State	SF	Senior	
2021–22	David Roddy	Colorado State	SF	Junior	
2022–23	Omari Moore	San Jose State	PG/SG	Senior	
2023–24	Great Osobor	Utah State	PF	Junior	
2024–25	Donovan Dent	New Mexico	PG	Junior	
2025–26	Mason Falslev	Utah State	SG	Junior	

== Winners by school ==
School (year joined)	Winners	Years
BYU (1999) (Note: BYU left in 2011 to join the West Coast Conference, and moved from there to the Big 12 Conference in 2023.)	5	2001, 2004^{†}, 2007, 2008^{†}, 2011
New Mexico (1999)	5	2003, 2008^{†}, 2010, 2013, 2025
San Diego State (1999) (Note: Boise State, Colorado State, Fresno State, San Diego State, and Utah State left in 2026 for the Pac-12 Conference.)	5	2006, 2012, 2014, 2020, 2021
Utah (1999) (Note: Utah left in 2011 to join what is now the Pac-12, and moved to the Big 12 in 2024.)	4	2000, 2002, 2005, 2009
Utah State (2013)	3	2019, 2024, 2026
Colorado State (1999)	2	2017, 2022
Air Force (1999)	1	2004^{†}
Boise State (2011)	1	2015
Fresno State (2012)	1	2016
Nevada (2012)	1	2018
San Jose State (2013)	1	2023
Grand Canyon (2025)	0	—
Hawaiʻi (2026) (Note: Hawaiʻi had been a football member of the MW since 2012, but did not become a full member until 2026.)	0	—
UC Davis (2026)	0	—
UNLV (1999)	0	—
UTEP (2026)	0	—
Wyoming (1999)	0	—
