= 2003–04 Stanford Cardinal men's basketball team =

American college basketball season

2003–04 Stanford Cardinal men's basketball

Pacific-10 regular season champions Pacific-10 Tournament champions

NCAA tournament, second round
- Conference: Pacific-10 Conference

Ranking
- Coaches: No. 6
- AP: No. 1
- Record: 30–2 (17–1 Pac-10)
- Head coach: Mike Montgomery (18th season)
- Assistant coaches: Tony Fuller; Eric Reveno; Russell Turner
- Home arena: Maples Pavilion

2003–04 Pacific-10 Conference men's basketball standings
	Conf.				Overall
Team	W		L	PCT	W		L	PCT
No. 6 Stanford†	17	–	1	.944	30	–	2	.938
Washington	12	–	6	.667	19	–	12	.613
Arizona	11	–	7	.611	20	–	10	.667
Oregon	9	–	9	.500	18	–	13	.581
California	9	–	9	.500	13	–	15	.464
USC	8	–	10	.444	13	–	15	.464
Washington State	7	–	11	.389	13	–	16	.448
UCLA	7	–	11	.389	11	–	17	.393
Oregon State	6	–	12	.333	12	–	16	.429
Arizona State	4	–	14	.222	10	–	17	.370
† Conference tournament winner As of April 4, 2004; Rankings from Coaches Poll

The 2003–04 Stanford Cardinal men's basketball team represented Stanford University in the 2003–04 NCAA Division I men's basketball season. It was Head Coach Mike Montgomery's eighteenth and final season with the Cardinal. The Cardinal were a member of the Pacific-10 Conference and were the Pac-10 regular season champions as well as the Pac-10 Tournament champions.

== Roster ==
Number	Name	Position	Height	Weight	Year	Hometown
0	Joe Kirchofer	Forward	6'9"	250	Senior	Elk Grove, CA
1	Josh Childress	Forward	6'8"	210	Junior	Lakewood, CA
2	Mark Bradford	Guard	6'2"	205	Freshman	Los Angeles, CA
3	Carlton Weatherby	Guard	6'1"	180	Sophomore	Tacoma, WA
11	Chris Hernandez	Guard	6'2"	190	Sophomore	Fresno, CA
15	Evan Moore	Forward	6'7"	235	Freshman	Brea, CA
20	Dan Grunfeld	Forward	6'6"	220	Sophomore	River Hills, WI
21	Nick Robinson	Forward	6'6"	205	Junior	Liberty, MO
22	Justin Davis	Forward	6'9"	230	Senior	Berkeley, CA
32	Jason Haas	Guard	6'2"	190	Sophomore	Spring Mills, PA
33	Matt Lottich	Guard	6'4"	205	Senior	Winnetka, IL
42	Rob Little	Center	6'10"	260	Junior	Hampton, VA
44	Fred Washington	Forward	6'5"	215	Freshman	Los Angeles, CA
52	Matt Haryasz	Forward	6'10"	230	Sophomore	Page, AZ

== Schedule and results ==
Date time, TV	Rank^{#}	Opponent^{#}	Result	Record	Site (attendance) city, state
Exhibition
Nov 16, 2003*; 5:00 pm		Team Nike	W 117–78	–	Maples Pavilion (N/A); Stanford, CA
Non-conference regular season
Nov 22, 2003*; 7:00 pm	No. 20	Sacramento State	W 77–59	1–0	Maples Pavilion (4,514); Stanford, CA
Nov 12, 2003*; 7:00 pm	No. 20	UC Irvine	W 72–59	2–0	Bren Events Center (5,000); Irvine, CA
Nov 30, 2003*; 1:30 pm	No. 20	Rice	W 60–56	3–0	Tudor Fieldhouse (5,000); Houston, TX
Dec 6, 2003*; 3:00 pm	No. 21	vs. No. 1 Kansas; Wooden Classic	W 64–58	4–0	Arrowhead Pond of Anaheim (17,816); Anaheim, CA
Dec 13, 2003*; 3:00 pm	No. 13	UNLV	W 86–71	5–0	Maples Pavilion (6,007); Stanford, CA
Dec 15, 2003*; 7:00 pm	No. 9	Florida International	W 77–60	6–0	Maples Pavilion; Stanford, CA
Dec 20, 2003*; 6:00 PM	No. 9	vs. No. 13 Gonzaga; Pete Newell Challenge	W 87–80	7–0	Oakland Arena (12,066); Oakland, CA
Dec 22, 2003*; 7:00 PM	No. 6	Southern Utah	W 67–37	8–0	Maples Pavilion (4,750); Stanford, CA
Dec 28, 2003*; 5:00 PM	No. 6	Harvard	W 100–59	9–0	Maples Pavilion (4,971); Stanford, CA
Pac-10 Regular season
Jan 2, 2004; 7:00 PM	No. 5	Washington State	W 73–51	10–0 (1–0)	Maples Pavilion (6,071); Stanford, CA
Jan 4, 2004; 1:00 PM	No. 5	Washington	W 85–72	11–0 (2–0)	Maples Pavilion (6,101); Stanford, CA
Jan 8, 2004; 7:30 PM	No. 4	at Arizona State	W 63–62	12–0 (3–0)	Wells Fargo Arena (10,545); Tempe, AZ
Jan 10, 2004; 3:30 PM	No. 4	at No. 3 Arizona	W 82–72	13–0 (4–0)	McKale Center (14,566); Tucson, AZ
Jan 17, 2004; 8:00 PM	No. 3	California	W 68–61	14–0 (5–0)	Maples Pavilion (7,391); Stanford, CA
Jan 22, 2004; 5:30 PM, FSN	No. 2	UCLA	W 67-52	15–0 (6–0)	Maples Pavilion (7,391); Stanford, CA
Jan 24, 2004; 7:00 PM	No. 2	USC	W 77–67	16–0 (7–0)	Maples Pavilion (7,391); Stanford, CA
Jan 29, 2004; 7:05 PM	No. 2	at Oregon State	W 62–48	17–0 (8–0)	Gill Coliseum (6,851); Corvallis, OR
Jan 31, 2004; 3:00 PM	No. 2	at Oregon	W 83–80	18–0 (9–0)	Matthew Knight Arena (9,087); Eugene, OR
Feb 5, 2004; 7:00 PM	No. 2	Arizona State	W 81–51	19–0 (10–0)	Maples Pavilion (7,391); Stanford, CA
Feb 7, 2004; 12:00 PM, ABC	No. 2	No. 12 Arizona	W 80–77	20–0 (11–0)	Maples Pavilion (7,391); Stanford, CA
Feb 14, 2004; 7:00 PM	No. 2	at California	W 69–58	21–0 (12–0)	Haas Pavilion (11,877); Berkeley, CA
Feb 19, 2004; 7:30 PM	No. 1	at USC	W 76–67	22–0 (13–0)	Los Angeles Memorial Sports Arena (7,539); Los Angeles, CA
Feb 21, 2004; 1:00 PM, CBS	No. 1	at UCLA	W 73–60	23–0 (14–0)	Pauley Pavilion (10,815); Los Angeles, CA
Feb 26, 2004; 7:00 PM	No. 1	Oregon State	W 73–47	24–0 (15–0)	Maples Pavilion (7,391); Stanford, CA
Feb 28, 2004; 4:00 PM	No. 1	Oregon	W 76–55	25–0 (16–0)	Maples Pavilion (7,391); Stanford, CA
Mar 4, 2004; 7:30 PM	No. 1	at Washington State	W 63–61	26–0 (17–0)	Friel Court (8,176); Pullman, WA
Mar 6, 2004; 3:00 PM, ABC	No. 1	at Washington	L 62–75	26–1 (17–1)	Alaska Airlines Arena (10,086); Seattle, WA
Pac-10 tournament
Mar 11, 2004; 12:20 PM	(1) No. 2	vs. (8) Washington State; First Round	W 68–47	27–1	Staples Center; Los Angeles, CA
Mar 12, 2004; 6:15 PM	(1) No. 2	vs. (5) Oregon; Semifinals	W 70–63	28–1	Staples Center; Los Angeles, CA
Mar 13, 2004; 3:15 PM, CBS	(1) No. 2	vs. (2) Washington; Finals	W 77–66	29–1	Staples Center; Los Angeles, CA
NCAA tournament
Mar 18, 2004*; 3:50 PM, CBS	(1 W) No. 1	(16 W) UTSA; First Round	W 71–45	30–1	KeyArena (15,512); Seattle, WA
Mar 20, 2004*; 3:40 pm, CBS	(1 W) No. 1	(8 W) Alabama; Second Round	L 67–70	30–2	KeyArena (15,827); Seattle, WA
*Non-conference game. ^{#}Rankings from AP Poll. (#) Tournament seedings in parentheses. All times are in Pacific Time.

== Rankings ==
Stanford was ranked #17 in the preseason Coaches' Poll and #20 in the preseason AP Poll. After going undefeated after 14 games, the Cardinal climbed to #2 in both polls (behind only Duke) by the ninth week of the season, where they remained until the thirteenth week of the season when they reached #1 in both polls. The Cardinal remained there until dropping to #2 in the sixteenth week (behind undefeated St. Joseph's) after their undefeated streak of 26 games ended when they were upset by Washington. The Cardinal returned to the #1 ranking the following week (the final poll of the season) after St. Joseph's lost 87–67 to Xavier in the quarterfinals of the Atlantic 10 tournament.

== Pac-10 tournament ==
First Round (March 11)
1	Stanford	68
8	Washington State	47
4	California	82
5	Oregon	87
3	Arizona	76
6	USC	73
2	Washington	91
7	UCLA	83

Semifinals (March 12)
1	Stanford	70
5	Oregon	63
3	Arizona	85
2	Washington	90

Finals (March 13)
1	Stanford	77
2	Washington	66

== NCAA tournament ==
Round One (March 18)
1	Stanford	71
16	Texas-San Antonio	45
8	Alabama	65
9	Southern Illinois	64

Round Two (March 20)
1	Stanford	67
8	Alabama	70

== Awards and honors ==
- Mike Montgomery, Legends of Coaching Award (adopted by the John R. Wooden Award Committee)

== 2004 NBA draft ==
Round	Pick	Player	NBA Team
1	6	Josh Childress	Atlanta Hawks
