= 2003–04 Arizona Wildcats men's basketball team =

American college basketball season

2003–04 Arizona Wildcats men's basketball

NCAA Tournament, Round of 64
- Conference: Pacific-10 Conference

Ranking
- AP: No. 22
- Record: 20–10 (11–7 Pac-10)
- Head coach: Lute Olson (21st season)
- Assistant coaches: Jim Rosborough; Rodney Tention; Josh Pastner
- Home arena: McKale Center

2003–04 Pacific-10 Conference men's basketball standings
	Conf.				Overall
Team	W		L	PCT	W		L	PCT
No. 6 Stanford†	17	–	1	.944	30	–	2	.938
Washington	12	–	6	.667	19	–	12	.613
Arizona	11	–	7	.611	20	–	10	.667
Oregon	9	–	9	.500	18	–	13	.581
California	9	–	9	.500	13	–	15	.464
USC	8	–	10	.444	13	–	15	.464
Washington State	7	–	11	.389	13	–	16	.448
UCLA	7	–	11	.389	11	–	17	.393
Oregon State	6	–	12	.333	12	–	16	.429
Arizona State	4	–	14	.222	10	–	17	.370
† Conference tournament winner As of April 4, 2004; Rankings from Coaches Poll

The 2003–04 Arizona Wildcats men's basketball team represented the University of Arizona during the 2003–04 NCAA Division I men's basketball season. Led by Lute Olson in his 21st year as Arizona's head coach, the team played their home games at McKale Center in Tucson, Arizona as members of the Pacific-10 Conference.

The team went 11–7 in regular-season conference play. They advanced to the semifinals of the 2004 Pac-10 tournament before losing to Washington 90–85. Seeded ninth in the South Region of the 2004 NCAA tournament, Arizona fell 80–76 to Seton Hall in the first round. The team went 20–10 overall.

After the season sophomore small forward Andre Iguodala entered the 2004 NBA draft in which he was selected ninth overall by the Philadelphia 76ers.

== Roster ==
2003–04 Arizona Wildcats men's basketball team
Players
Coaches

Pos.	#	Name	Height	Weight	Year	Previous school	Hometown
F	2	Isaiah Fox	6 ft 9 in (2.06 m)	255 lb (116 kg)	Jr	Crossroads School	Santa Monica, California
G	13	Chris Rodgers	6 ft 4 in (1.93 m)	205 lb (93 kg)	So	Wilson High School	Portland, Oregon
G	32	Beau Muhlbach (W)	6 ft 5 in (1.96 m)	205 lb (93 kg)	Fr	Lufkin High School	Lufkin, Texas
G	15	Mustafa Shakur	6 ft 3 in (1.91 m)	190 lb (86 kg)	Fr	Friends' Central School	Philadelphia, Pennsylvania
G	20	Salim Stoudamire	6 ft 1 in (1.85 m)	179 lb (81 kg)	Jr	Lake Oswego High School	Portland, Oregon
G	21	Hassan Adams	6 ft 4 in (1.93 m)	220 lb (100 kg)	So	Westchester High School	Los Angeles, California
F	30	Matt Brase	6 ft 6 in (1.98 m)	225 lb (102 kg)	Jr	Central Arizona College	Tucson, Arizona
C	45	Channing Frye	6 ft 11 in (2.11 m)	248 lb (112 kg)	Jr	St. Mary's High School	Phoenix, Arizona
C	54	Kirk Walters	6 ft 11 in (2.11 m)	247 lb (112 kg)	Fr	South Christian High School	Grand Rapids, Michigan
F	55	Ivan Radenović	6 ft 10 in (2.08 m)	240 lb (109 kg)	Fr	Secondary School of Sports	Belgrade, Serbia
F	24	Andre Iguodala	6 ft 6 in (1.98 m)	207 lb (94 kg)	So	Lanphier High School	Springfield, Illinois
G	11	Jason Ranne	6 ft 4 in (1.93 m)	201 lb (91 kg)	Sr	Bishop Kelley High School	Tulsa, Oklahoma
G	12	Fil Torres	6 ft 2 in (1.88 m)	200 lb (91 kg)	Sr	Naperville North High School	Lisle, Illinois
F	5	Ryan O'Hara	6 ft 6 in (1.98 m)	198 lb (90 kg)	Fr	John Muir High School	Pasadena, California

Head coach

- Lute Olsen (Augsburg)

Assistant coach(es)

- Jim Rosborough (Iowa)
- Rodney Tention (San Francisco)
- Josh Pastner (Arizona)

Legend

- (C) Team captain
- (S) Suspended
- (I) Ineligible
- (W) Walk-on
- Injured
- Current redshirt

Roster
Last update: February 7, 2019

== Schedule and results ==
Date time, TV	Rank^{#}	Opponent^{#}	Result	Record	Site city, state
Non-conference Regular season
Nov 24, 2003*	No. 4	Northern Arizona	W 107–73	1–0	McKale Center; Tucson, Arizona
Nov 28, 2003*	No. 4	vs. No. 8 Florida; MassMutual Tip-Off Classic	L 77–78	1–1	Springfield Civic Center; Springfield, Massachusetts
Dec 6, 2003*	No. 7	at Saint Louis	W 68–67	2–1	Savvis Center; St. Louis, Missouri
Dec 9, 2003*	No. 9	vs. No. 6 Texas; Jimmy V Men's Basketball Classic	W 91–83	3–1	Madison Square Garden; New York, New York
Dec 13, 2003*	No. 9	No. 22 Marquette	W 85–75	4–1	McKale Center; Tucson, Arizona
Dec 17, 2003*	No. 7	Saint Mary's	W 84–78	5–1	McKale Center; Tucson, Arizona
Dec 22, 2003*	No. 5	San Diego State	W 83–71	6–1	McKale Center; Tucson, Arizona
Dec 28, 2003*	No. 5	Liberty	W 107–91	7–1	McKale Center; Tucson, Arizona
Dec 30, 2003*	No. 4	Louisiana–Lafayette	W 72–69	8–1	McKale Center; Tucson, Arizona
Pac-10 Regular season
Jan 3, 2004	No. 4	at Arizona State	W 93–74	9–1 (1–0)	Wells Fargo Arena; Tempe, Arizona
Jan 8, 2004	No. 3	California	W 95–75	10–1 (2–0)	McKale Center; Tucson, Arizona
Jan 10, 2004	No. 3	No. 4 Stanford	L 72–82	10–2 (2–1)	McKale Center; Tucson, Arizona
Jan 15, 2004	No. 7	at USC	L 90–99	10–3 (2–2)	L.A. Sports Arena; Los Angeles, California
Jan 17, 2004	No. 7	at UCLA	W 97–72	11–3 (3–2)	Pauley Pavilion; Los Angeles, California
Jan 22, 2004	No. 14	Oregon State	W 109–75	12–3 (4–2)	McKale Center; Tucson, Arizona
Jan 25, 2004	No. 14	Oregon	W 90–66	13–3 (5–2)	McKale Center; Tucson, Arizona
Jan 29, 2004	No. 9	at Washington	L 83–96	13–4 (5–3)	Bank of America Arena; Seattle, Washington
Jan 31, 2004	No. 9	at Washington State	W 61–57	14–4 (6–3)	Beasley Coliseum; Pullman, Washington
Feb 5, 2004	No. 12	at California	L 83–87	14–5 (6–4)	Haas Pavilion; Berkeley, California
Feb 7, 2004	No. 12	at No. 2 Stanford	L 77–80	14–6 (6–5)	Maples Pavilion; Stanford, California
Feb 12, 2004	No. 16	USC	W 97–70	15–6 (7–5)	McKale Center; Tucson, Arizona
Feb 14, 2004	No. 16	UCLA	W 107–83	16–6 (8–5)	McKale Center; Tucson, Arizona
Feb 19, 2004	No. 14	at Oregon	W 100–87	17–6 (9–5)	McArthur Court; Eugene, Oregon
Feb 21, 2004	No. 14	at Oregon State	L 84–90	17–7 (9–6)	Gill Coliseum; Corvallis, Oregon
Feb 26, 2004	No. 17	Washington	L 84–89	17–8 (9–7)	McKale Center; Tucson, Arizona
Feb 28, 2004	No. 17	Washington State	W 72–60	18–8 (10–7)	McKale Center; Tucson, Arizona
Mar 7, 2004	No. 22	Arizona State	W 106–81	19–8 (11–7)	McKale Center; Tucson, Arizona
Pac-10 Tournament
Mar 11, 2004*	No. 21	vs. USC; Quarterfinals	W 79–76	20–8	Staples Center; Los Angeles, California
Mar 12, 2004*	No. 21	vs. Washington; Semifinals	L 85–90	20–9	Staples Center; Los Angeles, California
NCAA Tournament
Mar 18, 2004*	(9 ATL) No. 22	vs. (8 ATL) Seton Hall; First Round	L 76–80	20–10	RBC Center; Raleigh, North Carolina
*Non-conference game. ^{#}Rankings from AP Poll. (#) Tournament seedings in parentheses. ATL=Atlanta. All times are in Mountain Time.
