= 2003–04 UCLA Bruins men's basketball team =

American college basketball season

2003–04 UCLA Bruins men's basketball
- Conference: Pacific-10
- Record: 11–17 (7–12 Pac-10)
- Head coach: Ben Howland (1st season)
- Assistant coaches: Donny Daniels; Ernie Zeigler; Kerry Keating
- Home arena: Pauley Pavilion

2003–04 Pacific-10 Conference men's basketball standings
	Conf.				Overall
Team	W		L	PCT	W		L	PCT
No. 6 Stanford†	17	–	1	.944	30	–	2	.938
Washington	12	–	6	.667	19	–	12	.613
Arizona	11	–	7	.611	20	–	10	.667
Oregon	9	–	9	.500	18	–	13	.581
California	9	–	9	.500	13	–	15	.464
USC	8	–	10	.444	13	–	15	.464
Washington State	7	–	11	.389	13	–	16	.448
UCLA	7	–	11	.389	11	–	17	.393
Oregon State	6	–	12	.333	12	–	16	.429
Arizona State	4	–	14	.222	10	–	17	.370
† Conference tournament winner As of April 4, 2004; Rankings from Coaches Poll

The 2003–04 UCLA Bruins men's basketball team represented the University of California, Los Angeles in the 2003–04 NCAA Division I men's basketball season. The team finished 8th in the conference and lost in the first round of the Pac-10 tournament to the Washington Huskies. The 8th-place finish was the worst ever for UCLA since the conference expanded to 10 teams. The Bruins did not play in a post-season tournament. This was the first season for head coach Ben Howland following the departure of Steve Lavin.

== Roster ==
2003–04 UCLA Bruins men's basketball team
Players
Coaches

Pos.	#	Name	Height	Weight	Year	Hometown
F	4	Trevor Ariza	6 ft 7 in (2.01 m)	—	Fr	Miami, Florida
G	13	Gene Barnes	5 ft 10 in (1.78 m)	—	So
G	21	Cedric Bozeman (C)	6 ft 6 in (1.98 m)	215 lb (98 kg)	Jr	Los Angeles, California
G	5	Jon Crispin	6 ft 0 in (1.83 m)	—	Sr	Pitman, New Jersey
F	43	T. J. Cummings	6 ft 10 in (2.08 m)	223 lb (101 kg)	Sr	Homewood, Illinois
C	45	Michael Fey	7 ft 0 in (2.13 m)	—	So
G	55	Quinn Hawking	6 ft 3 in (1.91 m)	—	So
C	52	John Hoffart	6 ft 10 in (2.08 m)	—	Sr
C	15	Ryan Hollins	7 ft 0 in (2.13 m)	—	So	Pasadena, California
F	54	Josiah Johnson	6 ft 8 in (2.03 m)	—	Jr
F	25	Matt McKinney	6 ft 8 in (2.03 m)	—	Fr
G	3	Brian Morrison	6 ft 2 in (1.88 m)	—	Jr
G	2	Janou Rubin	6 ft 3 in (1.91 m)	—	Jr
G	1	Dijon Thompson (C)	6 ft 7 in (2.01 m)	193 lb (88 kg)	Jr	Los Angeles, California
G	10	Ryan Walcott	6 ft 1 in (1.85 m)	—	Jr
G	22	Ike Williams	6 ft 1 in (1.85 m)	—	So

Head coach

Ben Howland (Weber State)

Assistant coach(es)

- Donny Daniels (Cal State Fullerton)
- Ernie Zeigler (Northwood)
- Kerry Keating (Seton Hall)

Legend

- (C) Team captain
- (S) Suspended
- (I) Ineligible
- (W) Walk-on
- Injured
- Current redshirt

== Schedule ==
Date time, TV	Rank^{#}	Opponent^{#}	Result	Record	Site city, state
Exhibition
November 12, 2003		EA Sports All-Stars; Exhibition	W 74–67	0–0	Pauley Pavilion; Los Angeles, CA
November 18, 2003		Southern California All-Stars; Exhibition	W 95–59	0–0	Pauley Pavilion; Los Angeles, CA
Regular Season
November 29, 2003; FSNW2		Vermont	W 68–67	1–0	Pauley Pavilion (7,852); Los Angeles, CA
December 3, 2003		UC Riverside	W 84–70	2–0	Pauley Pavilion (7,331); Los Angeles, CA
December 6, 2003; CBS		vs. No. 9 Kentucky; John R. Wooden Classic	L 50–52	2–1	Arrowhead Pond of Anaheim (17,816); Anaheim, CA
December 13, 2003		Loyola Marymount	W 69–66 ^{OT}	3–1	Pauley Pavilion (7,240); Los Angeles, CA
December 17, 2003; FSNW		UC Santa Barbara	L 60–61	3–2	Pauley Pavilion (7,432); Los Angeles, CA
December 20, 2003; FSN		Michigan State	W 64–58	4–2	Pauley Pavilion (12,433); Los Angeles, CA
December 27, 2003; CBS		at Michigan	L 66–70	4–3	Crisler Arena (12,937); Ann Arbor, MI
January 2, 2004; FSNW2		Oregon State	W 77–66	5–3 (1–0)	Pauley Pavilion (8,792); Los Angeles, CA
January 4, 2004; FSN		Oregon	W 81–74	6–3 (2–0)	Pauley Pavilion (10,152); Los Angeles, CA
January 8, 2004		at Washington State	W 48–45	7–3 (3–0)	Spokane Arena (2,861); Spokane, WA
January 10, 2004; FSNW2		at Washington	W 86–84 ^{OT}	8–3 (4–0)	Hec Edmundson Pavilion (7,638); Seattle, WA
January 15, 2004		Arizona State	W 66–58	9–3 (5–0)	Pauley Pavilion (9,327); Los Angeles, CA
January 17, 2004; ABC		No. 7 Arizona	L 72–97	9–4 (5–1)	Pauley Pavilion (12,621); Los Angeles, CA
January 22, 2004; FSN		at No. 2 Stanford	L 52–67	9–5 (5–2)	Maples Pavilion (7,391); Stanford, CA
January 24, 2004; CBS		at California	L 62–76	9–6 (5–3)	Haas Pavilion (11,877); Berkeley, CA
January 28, 2004; FSNW2		USC	L 69–76	9–7 (5–4)	Pauley Pavilion (12,773); Los Angeles, CA
January 31, 2004; CBS		at St. John's	L 55–71	9–8	Madison Square Garden (9,077); New York, NY
February 5, 2004		Washington State	L 48–55	9–9 (5–5)	Pauley Pavilion (7,299); Los Angeles, CA
February 7, 2004; FSNW2		Washington	W 80–75	10–9 (6–5)	Pauley Pavilion (8,254); Los Angeles, CA
February 12, 2004; FSN		at Arizona State	L 62–74 ^{OT}	10–10 (6–6)	Wells Fargo Arena (9,339); Tempe, AZ
February 14, 2004; FSN		at No. 16 Arizona	L 83–107	10–11 (6–7)	McKale Center (14,566); Tucson, AZ
February 19, 2004; FSNW2		California	W 66–49	11–11 (7–7)	Pauley Pavilion (9,166); Los Angeles, CA
February 21, 2004; CBS		No. 1 Stanford	L 60–73	11–12 (7–8)	Pauley Pavilion (10,815); Los Angeles, CA
February 25, 2004; FSN		at USC	L 77–78 ^{OT}	11–13 (7–9)	Los Angeles Memorial Sports Arena (10,147); Los Angeles, CA
February 28, 2004; CBS		Notre Dame	L 60–75	11–14 (7–9)	Pauley Pavilion (8,486); Los Angeles, CA
March 04, 2004; FSN		at Oregon State	L 56–65	11–15 (7–10)	Gill Coliseum (6,384); Corvallis, OR
March 06, 2004; CBS		at Oregon	L 59–60	11–16 (7–11)	McArthur Court (9,087); Eugene, OR
Pac-10 Tournament
March 11, 2004; FSN		vs. Washington; First Round	L 83–91	11–17	Staples Center (14,689); Los Angeles, CA
*Non-conference game. ^{#}Rankings from AP Poll. (#) Tournament seedings in parentheses. All times are in Pacific Time.
