= 2004 Big 12 men's basketball tournament =

- Classification: Division I
- Season: 2003–04
- Teams: 11
- Site: American Airlines Center; Dallas, Texas
- Champions: Oklahoma State (1st title)
- Winning coach: Eddie Sutton (1st title)
- MVP: Tony Allen (Oklahoma State)
- Attendance: 105,610 (overall); 17,324 (championship)
- Top scorer: John Lucas (Oklahoma State) (60 points)
- Television: ESPN, ESPN2, ESPN Plus

2003–04 Big 12 men's basketball standings
	Conf.				Overall
Team	W		L	PCT	W		L	PCT
No. 4 Oklahoma State †	14	–	2	.875	31	–	4	.886
No. 12 Texas	12	–	4	.750	25	–	8	.758
No. 16 Kansas	12	–	4	.750	24	–	9	.727
Colorado	10	–	6	.625	18	–	11	.621
Texas Tech	9	–	7	.563	23	–	11	.676
Missouri	9	–	7	.563	16	–	14	.533
Oklahoma	8	–	8	.500	20	–	11	.645
Iowa State	7	–	9	.438	20	–	13	.606
Kansas State	6	–	10	.375	14	–	14	.500
Nebraska	6	–	10	.375	18	–	13	.581
Baylor	3	–	13	.188	8	–	21	.276
Texas A&M	0	–	16	.000	7	–	21	.250
† 2004 Big 12 Tournament winner Rankings from AP poll

The 2004 Big 12 men's basketball tournament was the postseason men's basketball tournament for the Big 12 Conference. It was played from March 11 to 14 in Dallas, Texas at the American Airlines Center. Oklahoma State won the tournament for the 1st time and received the conference's automatic bid to the 2004 NCAA tournament.

== Seeding ==
The Tournament consisted of a 12 team single-elimination tournament with the top 4 seeds receiving a bye.

2004 Big 12 Men's Basketball Tournament seeds
Seed	School	Conf.	Over.	Tiebreaker
1	Oklahoma State ‡#	14–2	31–4	
2	Texas #	12–4	25–8	
3	Kansas #	12–4	24–9	
4	Colorado #	10–6	18–11	
5	Texas Tech #	9–7	23–11	
6	Missouri	9–7	16–14	
7	Oklahoma	8–8	20–11	
8	Iowa State	7–9	20–13	
9	Kansas State	6–10	14–14	
10	Nebraska	6–10	18–13	
	Baylor	3–13	8–21	
11	Texas A&M	0–16	7–21	
‡ – Big 12 Conference regular season champions, and tournament No. 1 seed. # – Received a single-bye in the conference tournament. Overall records include all games played in the Big 12 Conference tournament.

†Baylor removed itself from postseason play, including the conference tournament, before the 2003–04 season due to the Baylor University basketball scandal. Because of this, Texas Tech got a bye in the first round of the tournament. This would be the first time in the history of the tournament that all the conference's member teams did not participate; it would not happen again until 2022, when Oklahoma State did not participate in the tournament due to an NCAA-imposed postseason ban.

== Schedule ==
Session	Game	Time	Matchup	Television	Attendance
First Round – Thursday, March 11
1	1	2:00 pm	#8 Iowa State 78 vs #9 Kansas State 64	ESPN Plus	16,912
2	2	6:00 pm	#7 Oklahoma 63 vs #10 Nebraska 59	ESPN Plus	16,950
2	3	12:00 pm	#1 Oklahoma State 83 vs #8 Iowa State 75	ESPN Plus	16,950
Quarterfinals – Friday, March 12
3	4	12:00 pm	#1 Oklahoma State 83 vs #8 Iowa State 75	ESPN Plus	17,267
3	5	2:20 pm	#5 Texas Tech 79 vs #4 Colorado 69	ESPN Plus	17,267
4	6	6:00 pm	#2 Texas 66 vs #7 Oklahoma 63	ESPN Plus	18,057
4	7	8:20 pm	#3 Kansas 94 vs #6 Missouri 69	ESPN Plus	18,057
Semifinals – Saturday, March 13
5	8	1:00 pm	#1 Oklahoma State 82 vs #5 Texas Tech 77	ESPN2	19,100
5	9	3:20 pm	#2 Texas 64 vs #3 Kansas 60	ESPN2	19,100
Final – Sunday, March 14
6	10	2:00 pm	#1 Oklahoma State 65 vs #2 Texas 49	ESPN	17,324
Game times in CT. #-Rankings denote tournament seed

== Bracket ==
First Round; Thursday, March 11
8	Iowa State	78
9	Kansas State	64
6	Missouri	74
11	Texas A&M	68
7	Oklahoma	69
10	Nebraska	59

Quarterfinals; Friday, March 12
8	Iowa State	75
1	#7 Oklahoma State	83
5	Texas Tech	79
4	Colorado	69
6	Missouri	69
3	#18 Kansas	94
2	#11 Texas	66
7	Oklahoma	63

Semifinals; Saturday, March 13
1	#7 Oklahoma St	82
5	Texas Tech	77
3	#18 Kansas	60
2	#11 Texas	64

Finals; Sunday, March 14
1	#7 Oklahoma St	65
2	#11 Texas	49

== All-Tournament Team ==
Most Outstanding Player – Tony Allen, Oklahoma State

Player	Team	Position	Class
Tony Allen	Oklahoma State	Sr.	G
Joey Graham	Oklahoma State	Jr.	G
John Lucas	Oklahoma State	Jr.	G
Wayne Simien	Kansas	Jr.	F
Brandon Mouton	Texas	Sr.	G

== See also ==
- 2004 Big 12 Conference women's basketball tournament
- 2004 NCAA Division I men's basketball tournament
- 2003–04 NCAA Division I men's basketball rankings
