= 2003–04 Kansas Jayhawks men's basketball team =

American college basketball season

2003–04 Kansas Jayhawks men's basketball

NCAA tournament, Elite Eight
- Conference: Big 12 Conference
- North

Ranking
- Coaches: No. 9
- AP: No. 16
- Record: 24–9 (12–4 Big 12)
- Head coach: Bill Self (1st season)
- Assistant coaches: Joe Dooley (1st season); Tim Jankovich (1st season); Norm Roberts (1st season)
- Captains: Jeff Graves; Bryant Nash
- Home arena: Allen Fieldhouse

2003–04 Big 12 men's basketball standings
	Conf.				Overall
Team	W		L	PCT	W		L	PCT
No. 4 Oklahoma State †	14	–	2	.875	31	–	4	.886
No. 12 Texas	12	–	4	.750	25	–	8	.758
No. 16 Kansas	12	–	4	.750	24	–	9	.727
Colorado	10	–	6	.625	18	–	11	.621
Texas Tech	9	–	7	.563	23	–	11	.676
Missouri	9	–	7	.563	16	–	14	.533
Oklahoma	8	–	8	.500	20	–	11	.645
Iowa State	7	–	9	.438	20	–	13	.606
Kansas State	6	–	10	.375	14	–	14	.500
Nebraska	6	–	10	.375	18	–	13	.581
Baylor	3	–	13	.188	8	–	21	.276
Texas A&M	0	–	16	.000	7	–	21	.250
† 2004 Big 12 Tournament winner Rankings from AP poll

The 2003–04 Kansas Jayhawks men's basketball team represented the University of Kansas in the 2003–04 NCAA Division I men's basketball season, which was the Jayhawks' 106th basketball season and first under head coach Bill Self who was hired after Roy Williams accepted the head coaching position at his alma mater North Carolina. The team played its home games in Allen Fieldhouse in Lawrence, Kansas. KU finished the season with a record of 24–9, 12–4 in Big 12 play to finish in a tie for second place in conference. The Jayhawks lost to Texas in the Big 12 tournament semifinals and received an at-large bid to the NCAA tournament as a No. 4 seed in the St. Louis Region. They advanced to the Elite Eight where they lost to Georgia Tech.

== Recruiting class ==
College recruiting information
Name	Hometown	School	Height	Weight	Commit date
Jeremy Case; PG	McAlester, OK	McAlester HS	6 ft 1 in (1.85 m)	190 lb (86 kg)	Apr 26, 2002
Jeremy Case; PG	Recruit ratings: Scout: Rivals: (N/A)				
J.R. Giddens; SF	Oklahoma City, OK	John Marshall	6 ft 5 in (1.96 m)	200 lb (91 kg)	Apr 26, 2002
J.R. Giddens; SF	Recruit ratings: Scout: Rivals: (N/A)				
David Padgett; C	Reno, NV	Reno HS	6 ft 10 in (2.08 m)	210 lb (95 kg)	Oct 2, 2002
David Padgett; C	Recruit ratings: Scout: Rivals: (N/A)				
Omar Wilkes; SG	Los Angeles, CA	Loyola HS	6 ft 2 in (1.88 m)	170 lb (77 kg)	Oct 2, 2002
Omar Wilkes; SG	Recruit ratings: Scout: Rivals: (N/A)				
Overall recruit ranking: Scout: 1 Rivals: 8 ESPN: N/A
Note: In many cases, Scout, Rivals, 247Sports, On3, and ESPN may conflict in their listings of height and weight.; In these cases, the average was taken. ESPN grades are on a 100-point scale.; Sources: "Kansas 2003 Basketball Commitments". Rivals.; "2003 Kansas Basketball Commits". Scout.; "ESPN". ESPN.; "Scout.com Team Recruiting Rankings". Scout.; "2003 Team Ranking". Rivals.

== Roster ==
Name	#	Position	Height	Weight	Year	Home town
Nick Bahe	21	Guard	6–2	180	Freshman	Lincoln, NE
Jeremy Case	10	Guard	6–0	165	Freshman	McAlester, OK
J.R. Giddens	15	Guard	6–5	195	Freshman	Oklahoma City, OK
Jeff Graves	42	Forward	6–9	255	Senior	Lee's Summit, MO
Jeff Hawkins	1	Guard	5–11	180	Sophomore	Kansas City, Kansas
Keith Langford	5	Guard	6–4	210	Junior	Fort Worth, TX
Michael Lee	25	Guard	6–3	215	Junior	Portland, OR
Aaron Miles	11	Guard	6–1	175	Junior	Portland, OR
Christian Moody	34	Forward	6–8	215	Sophomore	Asheville, NC
Bryant Nash	33	Forward	6–7	210	Senior	Carrollton, TX
Moulaye Niang	55	Forward	6–10	220	Sophomore	El Cajon, CA
Brett Olson	3	Forward	6–7	220	Senior	Chanute, KS
David Padgett	44	Center	6–11	230	Freshman	Reno, NV
Wayne Simien	23	Forward	6–9	250	Junior	Leavenworth, KS
Stephen Vinson	20	Guard	6–2	190	Sophomore	Lawrence, KS
Omar Wilkes	2	Guard	6–4	175	Freshman	Los Angeles, CA

== Schedule ==
Date time, TV	Rank^{#}	Opponent^{#}	Result	Record	Site (attendance) city, state
Regular season
11/21/2003*; 7:00 pm, J-TV	No. 6	UT Chattanooga	W 90–76	1–0	Allen Fieldhouse (16,300); Lawrence, KS
11/25/2003*; 8:00 pm, ESPN	No. 6	No. 3 Michigan State	W 81–74	2–0	Allen Fieldhouse (16,300); Lawrence, KS
12/1/2003*; 10:00 pm, ESPN2	No. 1	at TCU	W 85–66	3–0	Daniel-Meyer Coliseum (7,267); Fort Worth, TX
12/6/2003*; 3:00 pm, J-TV	No. 1	vs. No. 21 Stanford; John R. Wooden Classic	L 58–64	3–1	Arrowhead Pond of Anaheim (17,816); Anaheim, CA
12/10/2003*; 7:00 pm, J-TV	No. 5	Fort Hays State	W 80–40	4–1	Allen Fieldhouse (16,300); Lawrence, KS
12/13/2003*; 1:00 pm, ESPN	No. 5	Oregon; Feist Shootout	W 77–67	5–1	Kemper Arena (14,158); Kansas City, MO
12/20/2003*; 7:00 pm, J-TV	No. 6	vs. UC Santa Barbara; Wolf Pack Holiday Classic	W 72–52	6–1	Lawlor Events Center (N/A); Reno, NV
12/21/2003*; 9:30 pm, J-TV	No. 6	at Nevada; Wolf Pack Holiday Classic	L 61–75	6–2	Lawlor Events Center (10,983); Reno, NV
12/29/2003*; 7:00 pm, J-TV	No. 13	Binghamton	W 78–46	7–2	Allen Fieldhouse (16,300); Lawrence, KS
1/2/2004*; 7:00 pm, ESPN	No. 13	Villanova	W 86–79	8–2	Allen Fieldhouse (16,300); Lawrence, KS
1/5/2004; 8:00 pm, ESPN	No. 13	at Colorado	W 77–62	9–2 (1–0)	Coors Events Center (10,740); Boulder, CO
1/14/2004; 7:00 pm, ESPN+	No. 14	Kansas State	W 73–67	10–2 (2–0)	Allen Fieldhouse (16,300); Lawrence, KS
1/17/2004; 3:00 pm, ESPN	No. 14	at Texas A&M	W 71–65	11–2 (3–0)	Reed Arena (8,122); College Station, TX
1/22/2004*; 8:00 pm, ESPN2	No. 12	Richmond	L 68–69	11–3	Allen Fieldhouse (16,300); Lawrence, KS
1/25/2004; 1:00 pm, ESPN+	No. 12	Colorado	W 78–57	12–3 (4–0)	Allen Fieldhouse (16,300); Lawrence, KS
1/28/2004; 8:00 pm, ESPN+	No. 15	at Kansas State	W 78–70	13–3 (5–0)	Bramlage Coliseum (11,103); Manhattan, KS
1/31/2004; 3:00 pm, ESPN+	No. 15	at Iowa State	L 61–68	13–4 (5–1)	Hilton Coliseum (11,205); Ames, IA
2/2/2004; 8:00 pm, ESPN	No. 20	Missouri	W 65–56	14–4 (6–1)	Allen Fieldhouse (16,300); Lawrence, KS
2/7/2004; 3:00 pm, ESPN	No. 20	No. 19 Texas Tech	W 96–77	15–4 (7–1)	Allen Fieldhouse (16,300); Lawrence, KS
2/9/2004; 8:00 pm, ESPN	No. 12	at No. 10 Oklahoma State	L 60–80	15–5 (7–2)	Gallagher-Iba Arena (13,611); Stillwater, OK
2/15/2004; 12:30 pm, ABC	No. 12	at Nebraska	L 55–74	15–6 (7–3)	Bob Devaney Sports Center (13,611); Lincoln, NE
2/18/2004; 7:00 pm, J-TV	No. 21	Baylor	W 74–54	16–6 (8–3)	Allen Fieldhouse (16,300); Lawrence, KS
2/21/2004; 3:00 pm, ESPN+	No. 21	Iowa State	W 90–89 ^{OT}	17–6 (9–3)	Allen Fieldhouse (16,300); Lawrence, KS
2/23/2004; 8:00 pm, ESPN	No. 20	at No. 10 Texas	L 67–82	17–7 (9–4)	Frank Erwin Center (16,103) fAustin, TX
2/29/2004; 1:00 pm, CBS	No. 20	Oklahoma	W 79–58	18–7 (10–4)	Allen Fieldhouse (16,300); Lawrence, KS
3/3/2004; 6:30 pm, J-TV	No. 21	Nebraska	W 78–67	19–7 (11–4)	Allen Fieldhouse (16,300); Lawrence, KS
3/7/2004; 1:00 pm, CBS	No. 21	at Missouri	W 84–82	20–7 (12–4)	Hearnes Center (13,611); Columbia, MO
Big 12 Tournament
3/12/2004; 8:20 pm, ESPN+	(3) No. 18	vs. (6) Missouri quarterfinals	W 94–69	21–7	American Airlines Center (18,057); Dallas, TX
3/13/2004; 3:20 pm, ESPN2	(3) No. 18	vs. (2) No. 11 Texas semifinals	L 60–64	21–8	American Airlines Center (19,100); Dallas, TX
NCAA tournament
3/19/2004*; 8:45 pm, CBS	(4 St. Louis) No. 16	vs. (13 St. Louis) Illinois-Chicago; First Round	W 78–53	22–8	Kemper Arena (17,667); Kansas City, MO
3/21/2004*; 3:40 pm, CBS	(4 St. Louis) No. 16	vs. (12 St. Louis) Pacific; Second Round	W 78–63	23–8	Kemper Arena (17,667); Kansas City, MO
3/26/2004*; 6:10 pm, CBS	(4 St. Louis) No. 16	vs. (9 St. Louis) UAB; Sweet Sixteen	W 100–74	24–8	Edward Jones Dome (30,000); St. Louis, MO
3/28/2004*; 1:40 pm, CBS	(4 St. Louis) No. 16	(3 St. Louis) No. 14 Georgia Tech; Elite Eight	L 71–79 ^{OT}	24–9	Edward Jones Dome (30,648); St. Louis, MO
*Non-conference game. ^{#}Rankings from AP Poll. (#) Tournament seedings in parentheses. All times are in Central Time.

== Rankings ==
Poll	Pre	Wk 1	Wk 2	Wk 3	Wk 4	Wk 5	Wk 6	Wk 7	Wk 8	Wk 9	Wk 10	Wk 11	Wk 12	Wk 13	Wk 14	Wk 15	Wk 16	Wk 17	Final
AP	6	6	1	5	6	12	13	13	14	12	15	20	12	21	20	21	18	16	N/A
Coaches	5	5	1	7	7	11	13	14	12	10	12	17	13	20	18	18	15	14	9
