= Vegas Showdown (basketball) =

College basketball tournament

- Formerly: Wooden Legacy
- Sport: College basketball
- Founded: 2013
- No. of teams: 8 (2013–2019); 4 (2020–present)
- Most recent champion: BYU
- Website: Vegas Showdown

The Vegas Showdown, formerly known as the Wooden Legacy, is an annual early-season men's college basketball competition that began in 2013. It was formerly named in honor of basketball coach John Wooden, whose UCLA Bruins teams won 10 national championships over the 12 seasons from 1964 to 1975.

== History and format ==
The Wooden Legacy was formed in 2013 by a merger between the Wooden Classic and DirecTV Classic. From 2013 through 2019, eight teams competed in the Wooden Legacy in a three-day, 12-game bracketed tournament, with the games televised on the ESPN Networks (ESPN2, ESPNU, ESPN3). From 2013 to 2016, the first two rounds were played at Titan Gym on the campus of Cal State Fullerton in Fullerton, California, and the final day of competition took place at the Honda Center in Anaheim, California. From 2017 to 2019, all games were played at Titan Gym.

Beginning in 2020, plans called for the Wooden Legacy to have a two-day, four-team format, with all games played at the Anaheim Convention Center in Anaheim. The COVID-19 pandemic forced the cancellation of the 2020 tournament. The four-team, two-day tournament format instead debuted in 2021, with the semifinals and championship game televised by ESPN2 and the third-place game by ESPNU. The event was renamed to the Vegas Showdown in 2023.

== Brackets ==
* – Denotes overtime period

=== 2024 ===
The 2024 edition of the Vegas Showdown was a showcase format, played on Tuesday, November 26 at T-Mobile Arena in Las Vegas. As part of the Vegas Showdown, on the weekend following the doubleheader in Las Vegas, Seattle played Duke at Cameron Indoor Stadium while Furman traveled to play Kansas at Allen Fieldhouse.

November 26; T-Mobile Arena; Paradise, NV
11	Duke	72
1	Kansas	75

November 26; T-Mobile Arena; Paradise, NV
Furman	61
Seattle	56

==== Campus games ====
November 29; Cameron Indoor Stadium; Durham, NC
	Seattle	48
11	Duke	70

November 30; Allen Fieldhouse; Lawrence, KS
	Furman	51
1	Kansas	86

=== 2023 ===
The tournament took place from November 23–24, 2023 at Michelob Ultra Arena in Las Vegas and was renamed Vegas Showdown.

Semifinals; November 23
NC State	84
Vanderbilt	78
Arizona State	49
BYU	77

Championship; November 24
NC State	86
BYU	95
3rd place Game; November 24
Vanderbilt	67
Arizona State	82

=== 2022 ===
The 2022 tournament took place November 23 and 24, 2022.

Semifinals; November 23
Fresno State	57
Washington	62
Saint Mary's	75
Vanderbilt	65

Championship; November 24
Washington	68*
Saint Mary's	64
3rd place Game; November 24
Fresno State	59
Vanderbilt	67

=== 2021 ===
Semifinals; November 25
24	USC	70
Saint Joseph's	55
Georgetown	56
San Diego State	73

Championship; November 26
24	USC	58
San Diego State	43
3rd place Game; November 26
Saint Joseph’s	77
Georgetown	74

=== 2020 ===
Originally, Georgetown, Kansas, UCLA, and Virginia committed to play in the 2020 Wooden Legacy. In August 2020, the Pac-12 Conference announced the cancellation of all sports events for its member schools until January 1, 2021, because of the COVID-19 pandemic, threatening UCLA's participation; despite this, UCLA never withdrew from the Wooden Legacy. In the first round, Georgetown was expected to face Kansas and UCLA to play Virginia. In September 2020, ESPN announced plans to move the college basketball nonconference events it planned to run in November and December 2020, including the Wooden Legacy, to the ESPN Wide World of Sports Complex at Walt Disney World in Orlando, Florida, in an effort to keep players and staffs safer during the ongoing COVID-19 pandemic. The announcement prompted Georgetown and Virginia to withdraw from the tournament, and Seton Hall and Boise State replaced them. Ultimately, however, ESPN canceled all the 2020 tournaments, including the Wooden Legacy, in late October 2020.

=== 2019 ===
5th Place Game; Sunday, November 20
College of Charleston	56
UCF	77
7th Place Game
Providence	80
Pepperdine	77

Consolation 2nd Round; Friday, November 29
Providence	55
College of Charleston	63
UCF	78
Pepperdine	65

First Round; Thursday, November 28
Providence	65
Long Beach State	66
Wake Forest	65
College of Charleston	56
UCF	67
Penn	68
14	Arizona	93
Pepperdine	91

Semifinals; Friday, November 29
Long Beach State	75
Wake Forest	88
Penn	82
14	Arizona	92

Championship; Sunday, December 1
Wake Forest	66
14	Arizona	73
3rd Place Game
Long Beach State	79
Penn	95

=== 2018 ===
5th Place Game; Sunday, November 25
Northwestern	79
Utah	57
7th Place Game
La Salle	70
Grand Canyon	82

Consolation 2nd Round; Friday, November 23
La Salle	74
Northwestern	91
Grand Canyon	66
Utah	75

First Round; Thursday, November 22
La Salle	49
Miami (FL)	85
Northwestern	59
Fresno State	78
Seton Hall	82
Grand Canyon	75
Hawai'i	90
Utah	79

Semifinals; Friday, November 23
Miami (FL)	78
Fresno State	76
Seton Hall	64
Hawai'i	54

Championship; Sunday, November 25
Miami (FL)	81
Seton Hall	83
3rd Place Game
Fresno State	79
Hawai'i	64

==== Campus site games ====
November 16
Binghamton	52
Northwestern	84

=== 2017 ===
5th Place Game; Sunday, November 26
Harvard	61
Cal State Fullerton	70
7th Place Game
Saint Joseph's	74
Sacramento State	69

Consolation 2nd Round; Friday, November 24
Harvard	77
Saint Joseph's	71
Cal State Fullerton	68
Sacramento State	63

First Round; Thursday, November 23
21	Saint Mary's	89
Harvard	71
Saint Joseph's	71
Washington State	75
Georgia	64
Cal State Fullerton	57
San Diego State	89
Sacramento State	52

Semifinals; Friday, November 24
21	Saint Mary's	79
Washington State	84
Georgia	68
San Diego State	75

Championship; Sunday, November 26
Washington State	93
San Diego State	86
3rd Place Game
21	Saint Mary's	81
Georgia	83*

==== Campus site games ====
Game 1 December 4
Sacramento State	54
Saint Mary's	70

=== 2016 ===
5th Place Game; Sunday, November 27
New Mexico	57
Dayton	64
7th Place Game
Cal State Northridge	78
Portland	96

Consolation 2nd Round; Friday, November 25
Cal State Northridge	89
New Mexico	105
Dayton	84
Portland	74

First Round; Thursday, November 24
Texas A&M	95
Cal State Northridge	73
New Mexico	72
Virginia Tech	92
Dayton	78
Nebraska	80
Portland	77
14	UCLA	99

Semifinals; Friday, November 25
Texas A&M	68
Virginia Tech	65
Nebraska	71
14	UCLA	82

Championship; Sunday, November 27
Texas A&M	67
14	UCLA	74
3rd Place Game
Virginia Tech	66
Nebraska	53

=== 2015 ===
5th Place Game; Sunday, November 29
UC Irvine	56
Evansville	75
7th Place Game
Boston College	45
Santa Clara	62

Consolation 2nd Round; Friday, November 27
UC Irvine	80
Boston College	67
Evansville	69
Santa Clara	57

First Round; Thursday, November 26
Boise State	71
UC Irvine	64
Boston College	68
3	Michigan State	99
Evansville	64
Providence	74
Santa Clara	73
11	Arizona	75

Semifinals; Friday, November 27
Boise State	67
3	Michigan State	77
Providence	69
11	Arizona	65

Championship; Sunday, November 29
3	Michigan State	77
Providence	73
3rd Place Game
Boise State	59
11	Arizona	68

=== 2014 ===
5th Place Game; Sunday, November 30
San Diego	66
Western Michigan	68
7th Place Game
Princeton	69
San Jose State	54

Consolation 2nd Round; Friday, November 28
Princeton	65
San Diego	75
Western Michigan	79
San Jose State	60

First Round; Thursday, November 27
Princeton	56
UTEP	62
San Diego	71
Xavier	82
Long Beach State	73
Western Michigan	55
San Jose State	56
Washington	78

Semifinals; Friday, November 28
UTEP	77
Xavier	73
Long Beach State	70
Washington	80

Championship; Sunday, November 30
UTEP	65
Washington	68
3rd Place Game
Xavier	70
Long Beach State	73

=== 2013 ===
5th Place Game; Sunday, December 1
Miami (FL)	60
Arizona State	57
7th Place Game
Cal State Fullerton	48
College of Charleston	61

Consolation 2nd Round; Friday, November 29
Miami (FL)	48
Cal State Fullerton	46
College of Charleston	58
Arizona State	80

First Round; Thursday, November 28
Miami (FL)	63
George Washington	71*
25	Marquette	86
Cal State Fullerton	66
College of Charleston	52
San Diego State	72
20	Creighton	88
Arizona State	60

Semifinals; Friday, November 29
George Washington	60
25	Marquette	76
San Diego State	86
20	Creighton	80

Championship; Sunday, December 1
25	Marquette	59
San Diego State	67
3rd Place Game
George Washington	60
20	Creighton	53
