= Wayne Morgan (basketball) =

American basketball coach

Biographical details
- Born: October 7, 1950 (age 76); Brooklyn, New York, U.S.

Coaching career (HC unless noted)
- 1973–1974: Ithaca (assistant)
- 1974–1975: Dutchess CC
- 1975–1979: Dartmouth (assistant)
- 1979–1984: Xavier (assistant)
- 1984–1996: Syracuse (assistant)
- 1996–2002: Long Beach State
- 2002–2003: Iowa State (assistant)
- 2003–2006: Iowa State
- 2009–2013: Hofstra (assistant)

Head coaching record
- Overall: 146–123

Accomplishments and honors

Championships
- Big West West Division (2000)

Wayne Morgan (born October 7, 1950) was the Iowa State University men's basketball coach from 2003 to 2006. He was Iowa State University's first African-American head basketball coach.

== Career ==
Morgan was a coach at Syracuse under Jim Boeheim until 1996. He coached at Long Beach State for six seasons before accepting the head coaching position at Iowa State. In three years at Iowa State, Morgan had a combined record of 55-39, marking his record fourth to Larry Eustachy (72-26, two NCAA tournament appearances, one Elite eight appearance), Tim Floyd (69-29, twice second round of NCAA tourney), and Fred Hoiberg (62-39, two round of 32 NCAA tournament appearances) in the history of Iowa State University basketball coaches finishing their third year. During this time his team went to the NIT semifinals and the second round of the NCAA tournament, where they were overpowered by the eventual national champions, North Carolina. Morgan's third year, struggling to rebuild the four and five positions, was less spectacular, finishing with a 16-14 record overall. He was fired by athletic director Jamie Pollard in March 2006 due to an emerging scandal in which Iowa State University allegedly paid a third party, D1 Scheduling, money which was linked to a cash-for-recruits program. Investigations by NCAA, conferences and schools found no wrongdoing. Morgan was replaced by Greg McDermott, a native Iowan, and head coach of the University of Northern Iowa.

His up-tempo style of basketball generated doubt across the state but produced a memorable first season that featured a team which was playing its best basketball late in the season. ISU recorded 20 wins in Morgan's rookie season, tying for the ninth-best win total in school history. The 20 wins produced by Morgan, which is the second-best win total for an ISU coach in his first season at the helm, was just one of several highlights in his inaugural season.

The Cyclones were virtually unbeatable at home, going 17-1 in Hilton Coliseum. The 17 home wins was the second-highest home win tally in school history and the 94.4 percent home winning percentage is the fifth-best clip in the ISU annals. Three of ISU's 17 home wins were against teams that advanced to the NCAA Sweet Sixteen (Xavier, Kansas, Texas) and two were against instate rivals Iowa and Drake, helping ISU win its second consecutive mythical state championship. Morgan paced ISU to a NIT appearance, the school's 14th postseason bid in the last 21 years. The Cyclones caught fire in the NIT, defeating Georgia, Florida State and Marquette, earning a trip to New York City in the semifinals at Madison Square Garden.

One of Morgan's star players in his first season was Curtis Stinson, a fellow New Yorker who he recruited to ISU in his first season as an assistant with the Cyclones. Stinson was one of the best freshman in all of college basketball, earning Big 12 Freshman of the Year honors and first-team Freshman All-America accolades by Basketball Times. Stinson and Jackson Vroman both earned third-team all-Big 12 honors in Morgan's first year. Vroman led the league in rebounding, becoming the first Cyclone to top the conference in boards since 1980. Morgan helped Vroman develop into one of the best centers in the nation in his final season with the Cyclones. His improvement enabled him get drafted in the second round of the 2004 NBA Draft as the No. 31 pick.

Morgan was tabbed as Iowa State University's 17th men's basketball coach May 14, 2003. He spent his first season in Ames as an assistant at Iowa State, joining the ISU basketball staff in July 2002. As an assistant on the 2002-03 Cyclone staff, Morgan helped ISU to an NIT berth, as ISU finished 17-14, tying for the 13th-best win total in school history. A top-notch recruiter, he was instrumental in helping the Cyclones sign a nationally ranked recruiting class in 2003 and 2004.

Morgan was involved in 12 NCAA Tournaments, seven regular-season conference titles, four NIT appearances and tutored nineteen players who have gone on to NBA careers. He spent six years as head coach at Long Beach State, where he compiled a 91-84 overall mark and a 55-39 record in the Big West Conference before he was fired. Morgan coached three teams that finished first or second in the Big West Western Division. His 1999-2000 squad was 24-6 overall and 15-1 in the Big West en route to winning the conference championship. The 1999-2000 team was one of the best in LBSU history, qualifying for the National Invitation Tournament. It compiled the third-longest winning streak in school history (15 games), tied for the third-most wins in 49er history. Morgan is also a 2008 inductee into the Westchester Community College Hall of fame as well as a 2018 inductee into the Brooklyn USA Basketball Hall of Fame.

From 2009-2013, Morgan was an assistant coach at Hofstra University.

He is the author of two DVDs: Wayne Morgan: Mastering the 2-3 zone defense; and Wayne Morgan: The Philosophy of changing defenses and the 2-3 zone. Both feature his mastery of the 2-3 zone, much of what he learned as an assistant to Coach Jim Boeheim of Syracuse between 1984 and 1996.

== Head coaching record ==
Record table
Season	Team	Overall	Conference	Standing	Postseason
Long Beach State (Big West Conference) (1996–2002)
1996–97	Long Beach State	13–14	9–7	2nd (West)	
1997–98	Long Beach State	10–19	5–11	5th (West)	
1998–99	Long Beach State	13–15	9–7	T–2nd (West)	
1999–2000	Long Beach State	24–6	15–1	1st (West)	NIT 1st Round
2000–01	Long Beach State	18–13	10–6	3rd	
2001–02	Long Beach State	13–17	9–9	T–6th	
Long Beach State:		91–84	57–41		
Iowa State (Big 12 Conference) (2003–2006)
2003–04	Iowa State	20–13	7–9	8th	NIT Semifinals
2004–05	Iowa State	19–12	9–7	T–5th	NCAA 2nd round
2005–06	Iowa State	16–14	6–10	T–7th	
Iowa State:		55–39	22–26		
Total:		146–123	79–67		
National champion Postseason invitational champion Conference regular season champion Conference regular season and conference tournament champion Division regular season champion Division regular season and conference tournament champion Conference tournament champion
