= Anaheim Convention Center =

Arena in California, United States

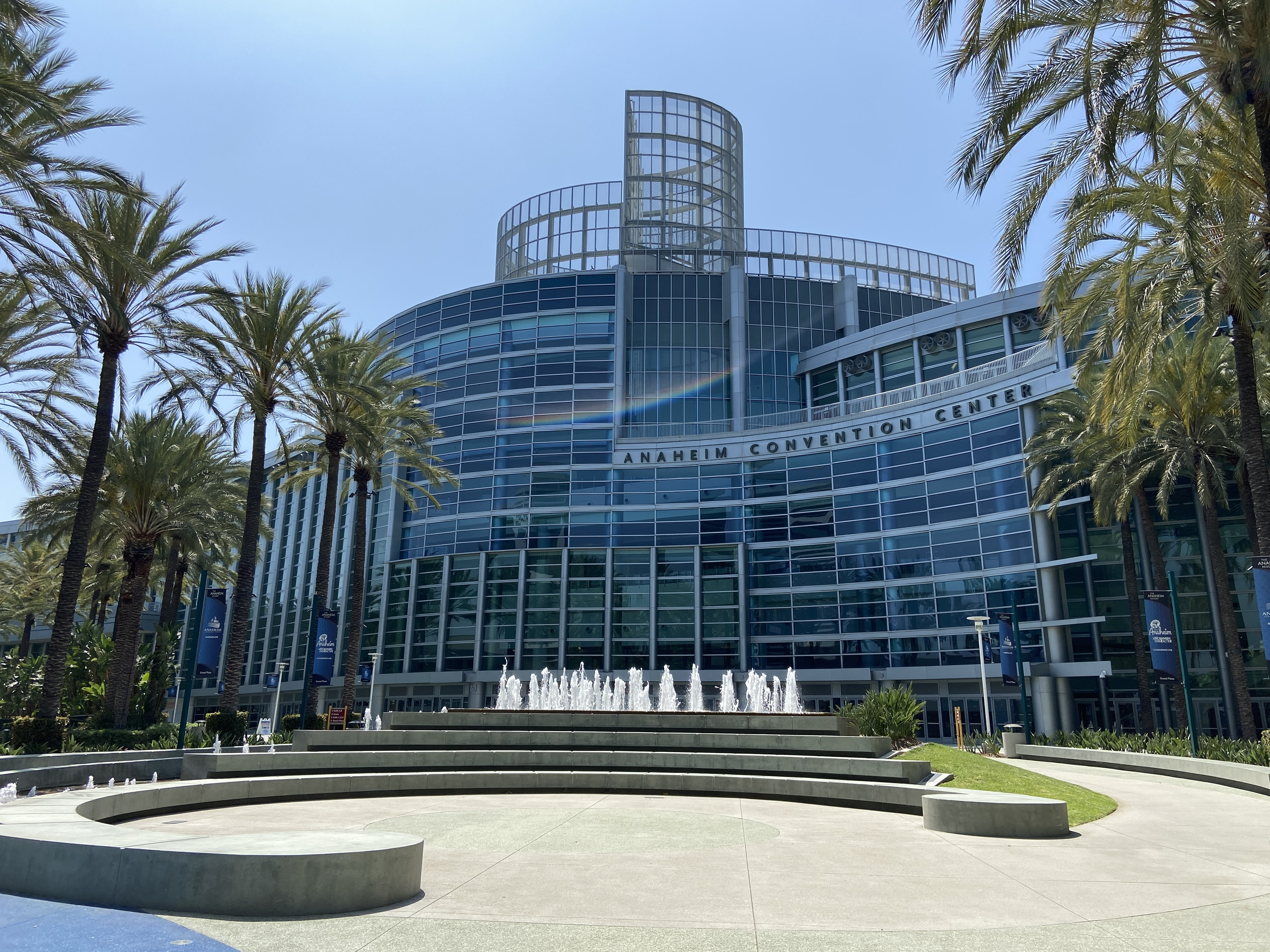
- Exterior of venue, c. 2021
- Interactive map of Anaheim Convention Center
- Address: 800 West Katella Avenue; Anaheim, CA 92802-3415
- Location: Anaheim Resort
- Coordinates: 33.802455°N 117.919843°W
- Owner: City of Anaheim
- Operator: Anaheim/Orange County Visitor & Convention Bureau

Construction
- Opened: July 12, 1967
- Renovated: 1974, 1982, 1990, 1999–2000, 2015–17
- Cost: $15 million ($156 million in 2025 dollars)

Tenants
- Anaheim Amigos (ABA) (1967–1968); San Diego Friars (WTT) (1975–1977); Anaheim Oranges (WTT) (1978); California Surf (NASL) (1979–1980); Anaheim Bullfrogs (RHI) (1993); Anaheim Arsenal (NBA D–League) (2006–2009)

Website
- Venue website

The Anaheim Convention Center is a convention center in Anaheim, California, United States. It is located across from the Disneyland Resort on Katella Avenue. The original components, designed by Adrian Wilson & Associates and built by the Del E. Webb Corporation, opened in July 1967—including a basketball arena followed shortly by the convention hall. It has hosted many events, like Star Wars Celebration, VidCon, BlizzCon, Anime Expo, D23 Expo, WonderCon, NAMM Show, Pokémon World Championships, competitions, and more. In addition to hosting various types of conventions, the Anaheim Convention Center was used to host the wrestling during the 1984 Summer Olympics.

The center has subsequently undergone six major expansions (1974, 1982, 1990, 1993, 1999–2000, 2016–2017). With a total space of 1,800,000 sq ft (170,000 m^{2}), it is the largest convention center on the West Coast of the United States. The center includes 813,607 sq ft (75,586.6 m^{2}) of exhibition space, 81,423 sq ft (7,564.4 m^{2}) of meeting space, and 38,058 sq ft (3,535.7 m^{2}) of ballroom space.

== Hostings ==
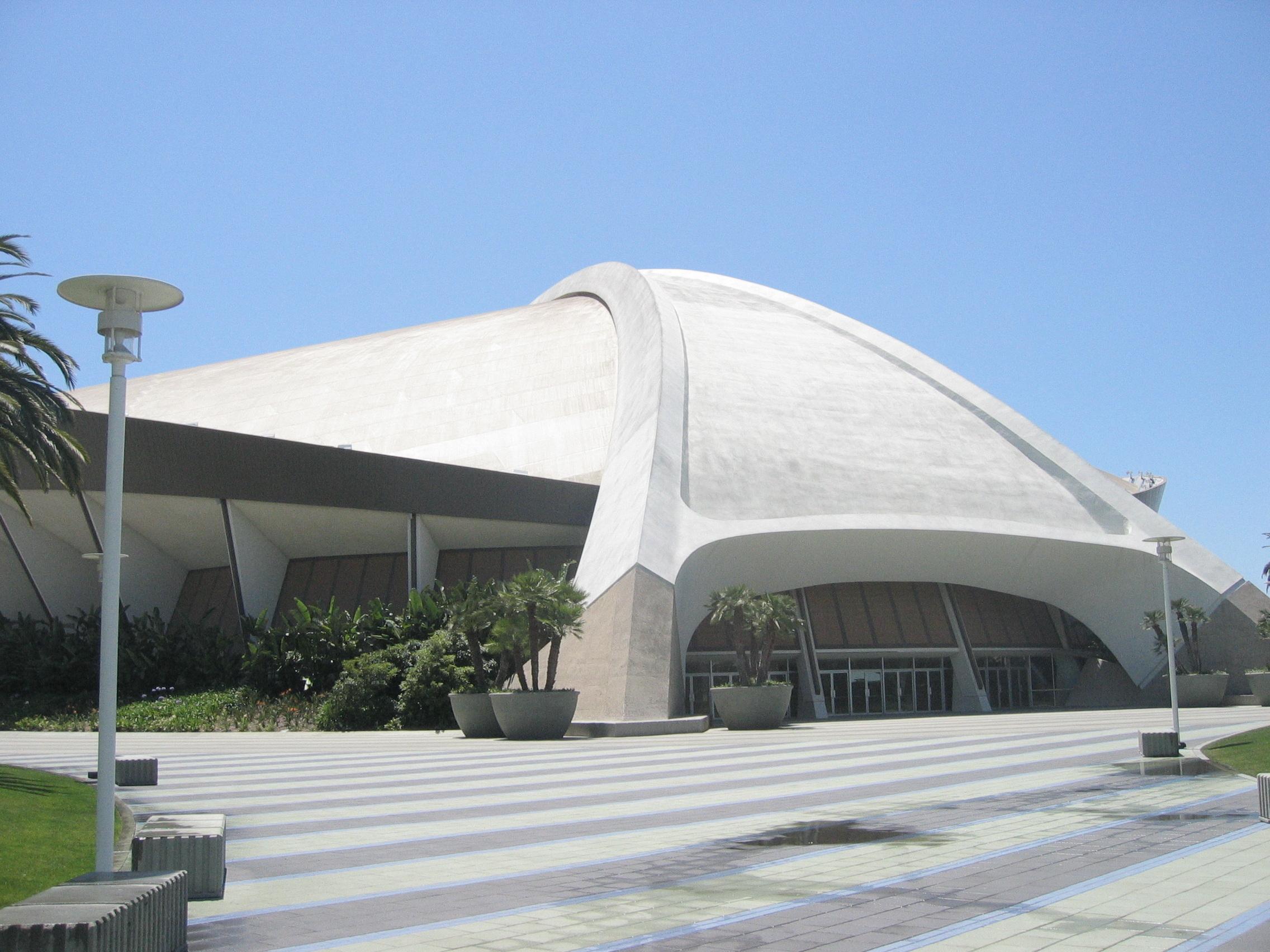
The Arena at the Anaheim Convention Center in 2007

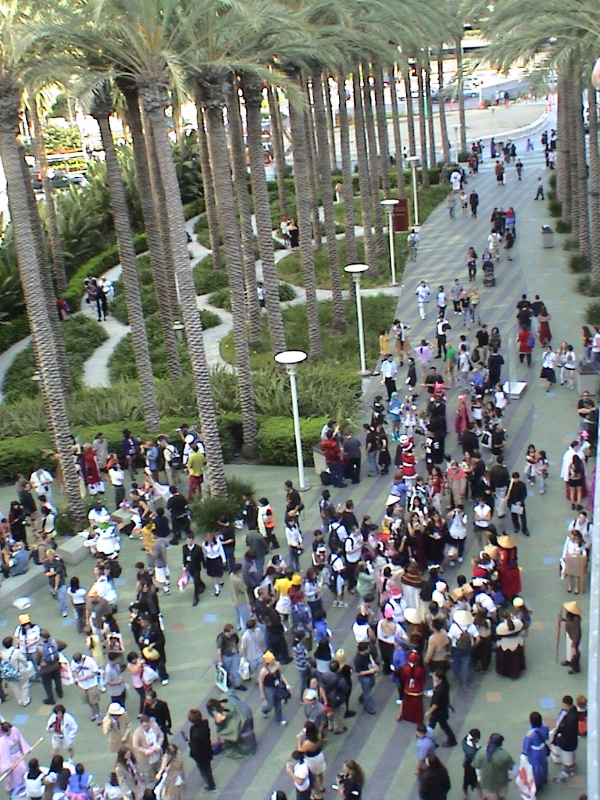
2004 Anime Expo

Originally, the arena was home to the Anaheim Amigos of the American Basketball Association during the first ABA season, 1967–68. The franchise relocated to the Los Angeles Sports Arena and became the Los Angeles Stars immediately thereafter; the team eventually moved to Salt Lake City and became the Utah Stars, capturing the 1970–71 ABA Championship. The Stars' subsequent fan support in Utah set the foundation for the NBA's Utah Jazz. The San Diego Friars of WTT played some of their home matches in the arena between 1975 and 1977. In 1978, the Anaheim Oranges of WTT used the arena as their primary home venue. The arena was also home to the California Surf of the NASL for one indoor season (1979–80).

According to frequent news reports, the largest exposition held at the Convention Center in recent years has been the Winter NAMM Show. This music-equipment convention (trade only, not open to the general public) had over 2,000 exhibitors and a record-breaking 115,888 attendees during the 2020 show. The NAMM Show has been running at the Anaheim Center since 1977, except for a three-year break in 1998–2000 while the Convention Center underwent major renovations, and in 2021 due to the COVID-19 pandemic. In 2008, news reports indicated that NAMM's long-term lease with the Anaheim Convention Center authority would end in 2010, and NAMM was applying pressure to the City of Anaheim to further expand and improve the convention center. The NAMM Show did ultimately occur in the convention center in 2011 and the subsequent years.

The Anime Expo was hosted at the Anaheim Convention Center in 1996 and again from 2003 through 2006 and was one of the convention center's biggest public events.

Blizzard Entertainment holds BlizzCon at the venue. In 2005, BlizzCon used the northern two conference halls, (and the arena for a concert one evening). In 2007 and 2008, it used three conference halls. In 2009, it used four conference halls. While tickets to the 2007 event sold out in 3 days, tickets to the October 2008 event sold out "within minutes," and tickets to the August 2009 event sold out in "56 seconds". Tickets to the 2010 Blizzcon reportedly sold out within 30 seconds.

Another large convention held at the center is the Medical Design and Manufacturing Show, held shortly after Winter NAMM.

The venue served as the site for wrestling at the 1984 Summer Olympics.

The venue hosted the Big West Conference's men's and women's college basketball tournaments from 2001 to 2010 and the 76 Classic college basketball tournament from 2007 to 2012. The Wooden Legacy college basketball tournament has been hosted at the convention center since 2021 (the 2020 edition of the tournament was scheduled to be hosted at the venue prior to being cancelled due to the COVID-19 pandemic).

It was briefly home to the Anaheim Arsenal basketball team in the NBA Development League from 2006 to 2009 before it relocated to Springfield, Massachusetts, for the 2009–10 season.

During the 1992 Los Angeles riots, the Los Angeles Clippers were forced to move Game 4 of their NBA playoff series versus the Utah Jazz to the Convention Center.

VidCon has been held at the Anaheim Convention Center since its third annual event in 2012. The new venue offered a much larger capacity than the previously used Hyatt Regency Century Plaza hotel in Los Angeles. WonderCon is hosted annually at the convention center since 2012, with the exception of 2016 when it was held at the Los Angeles Convention Center.

The 2012 VEX Robotics World Championship was also held in the convention center. Almost 600 teams were present at the competition which utilized two of the convention center's exhibit halls, as well as the convention centers Arena. In 2013 the VEX Robotics World Championship returned to the Anaheim Convention Center, occupying 3 exhibit halls as well as the arena. There were over 700 teams present, representing 24 nations. Each competed to be crowned the World Championship within their respective divisions.

Disney's inaugural D23 Expo, a biennial convention for Disney fans, was held at the Anaheim Convention Center in 2009. The convention center has hosted all subsequent D23 Expos.

Lucasfilm's Star Wars Celebration fan gathering was held at the convention center in 2015. The Star Wars Celebration was scheduled to be held there for a second time in 2020, but was postponed to 2022.

Minecon was held at the venue in September 2016.

It hosted the 2017 World Weightlifting Championships.

The Collegiate Challenge gymnastics meet was held in the arena in 2019.

The convention center hosted the 2017 FBLA-PBL National Leadership Conference.

The convention center hosted the 2019 Business Professionals of America National Leadership Conference.

The convention center and arena is currently hosting the California State Future Farmers of America leadership conference, which started in 2018, the largest youth convention in the State of California. As of 2019, 9,000 students from across the state of California have attended the event, with more expecting to show up in the future.

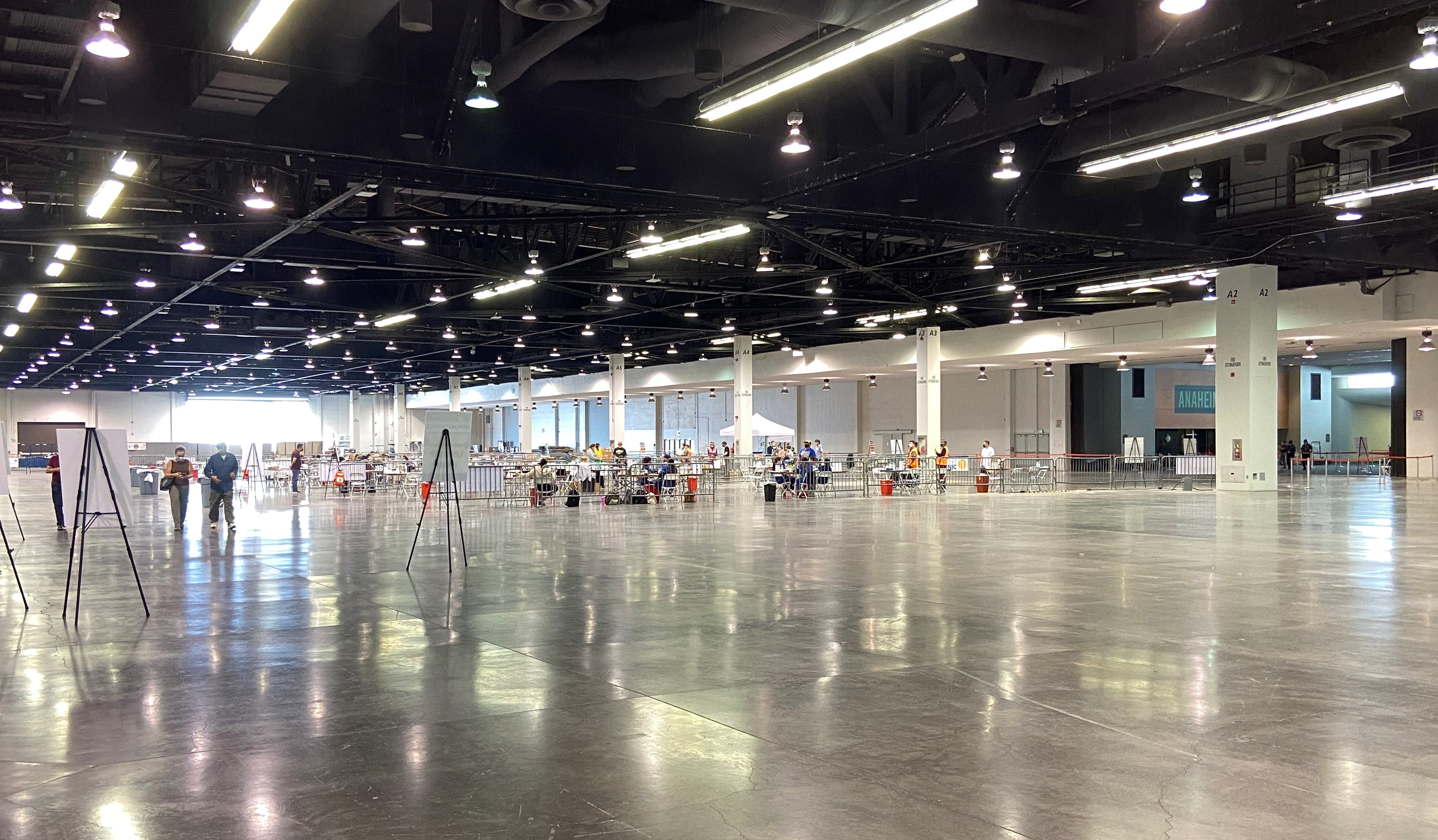
Exhibit Hall A serving as a COVID-19 vaccination site, May 2021

The convention center was a filming location for Star Trek: Picard and made an appearance in the show as a part of Starfleet Headquarters.

The convention center served as a mass COVID-19 vaccination site for Orange County workers and residents from February to June 2021.

The convention center hosted the 2025 Future Business Leaders of America National Leadership Conference and the 2025 Pokémon World Championships.

== See also ==
- Convention centers in California
- List of convention centers in the United States
- Sports venues in Anaheim, California
- Tourist attractions in Orange County, California
