= Tony Fuller =

American basketball player (born 1958)

Personal information
- Born: September 4, 1958 (age 68) Detroit, Michigan, U.S.
- Listed height: 6 ft 4 in (1.93 m)
- Listed weight: 180 lb (82 kg)

Career information
- High school: Saint Martin de Porres (Detroit, Michigan)
- College: Vincennes (1976–1978); Pepperdine (1978–1980)
- NBA draft: 1980: 5th round, 93rd overall pick
- Drafted by: Detroit Pistons
- Playing career: 1980–1982
- Position: Shooting guard
- Number: 43
- Coaching career: 1982–2015

Career history

Playing
- 1980–1981: Detroit Pistons
- 1981–1982: Anchorage Northern Knights

Coaching
- 1982–1988: Pepperdine (assistant)
- 1988–1992: UCLA (assistant)
- 1992–1994: San Diego State
- 1994–1996: Pepperdine
- 1996–1998: Colorado State (assistant)
- 1998–1999: Utah State (assistant)
- 1999–2006: Stanford (assistant)
- 2006–2015: Brophy College Preparatory

Career highlights
- As assistant coach: Pac-10 tournament champion (2004); 3× Pac-10 regular season champion (2000, 2001, 2004); 3× WCC regular season champion (1983, 1985, 1986)

Career NBA statistics
- PPG: 4.0
- RPG: 2.8
- APG: 1.9
- Stats at NBA.com
- Stats at Basketball Reference

Anthony Ike Fuller (September 4, 1958) is an American former professional basketball shooting guard who spent one season in the National Basketball Association (NBA) as a member of the Detroit Pistons (1980–81). He attended Pepperdine University, where he was drafted by the Pistons in the fifth round of the 1980 NBA draft. He was varsity basketball coach at Brophy College Preparatory in Phoenix, Arizona from 2006 to 2015.

== Career statistics ==
Legend
GP	Games played	GS	Games started	MPG	Minutes per game
FG%	Field goal percentage	3P%	3-point field goal percentage	FT%	Free throw percentage
RPG	Rebounds per game	APG	Assists per game	SPG	Steals per game
BPG	Blocks per game	PPG	Points per game	**Bold**	Career high

=== NBA ===
==== Regular season ====
Year	Team	GP	MPG	FG%	3P%	FT%	RPG	APG	SPG	BPG	PPG
1980–81	Detroit	15	16.5	.364	.000	.750	2.8	1.9	.7	.1	4.0
