= 2003–04 Washington Huskies men's basketball team =

American college basketball season

2003–04 Washington Huskies men's basketball

NCAA tournament, First round
- Conference: Pacific-10 Conference
- Record: 19–12 (12–6 Pac-10)
- Head coach: Lorenzo Romar (2nd season)
- Assistant coaches: Cameron Dollar; Ken Bone; Russ Schoene
- Home arena: Hec Edmundson Pavilion

2003–04 Pacific-10 Conference men's basketball standings
	Conf.				Overall
Team	W		L	PCT	W		L	PCT
No. 6 Stanford†	17	–	1	.944	30	–	2	.938
Washington	12	–	6	.667	19	–	12	.613
Arizona	11	–	7	.611	20	–	10	.667
Oregon	9	–	9	.500	18	–	13	.581
California	9	–	9	.500	13	–	15	.464
USC	8	–	10	.444	13	–	15	.464
Washington State	7	–	11	.389	13	–	16	.448
UCLA	7	–	11	.389	11	–	17	.393
Oregon State	6	–	12	.333	12	–	16	.429
Arizona State	4	–	14	.222	10	–	17	.370
† Conference tournament winner As of April 4, 2004; Rankings from Coaches Poll

The 2003–04 Washington Huskies men's basketball team represented the University of Washington for the 2003–04 NCAA Division I men's basketball season. Led by second-year head coach Lorenzo Romar, the Huskies were members of the Pacific-10 Conference and played their home games on campus at Hec Edmundson Pavilion in Seattle, Washington.

The Huskies were 17–10 overall in the regular season and 12–6 in conference play, second in the standings.

Washington lost their first five Pac-10 games, then won twelve of thirteen to finish as runner-up. In the eight-team conference tournament, they defeated UCLA in the quarterfinal and Arizona in the semifinal, the first team in 65 years to defeat the Wildcats three times in one season. In the final, they met top seed Stanford; a week earlier, the undefeated Cardinal traveled to Seattle and lost by thirteen points. It was a different outcome in the tourney in Los Angeles as Stanford won by eleven points.

Washington returned to the NCAA tournament for the first time in five years, and were seeded eighth in the St. Louis regional. In the first round at Columbus, Ohio, the Huskies scored a hundred points, but lost to ninth seed UAB by two.

== Postseason results ==
Date time, TV	Opponent	Result	Record	Site (attendance) city, state
Pacific-10 Tournament
Thu, March 11; 6:00 pm, FSN	vs. (7) UCLA; Quarterfinal	W 91–83	18–10	Staples Center (13,625); Los Angeles, California
Fri, March 12; 8:30 pm, FSN	vs. (3) Arizona; Semifinal	W 90–85	19–10	Staples Center (15,754); Los Angeles, California
Sat, March 13; 3:00 pm, CBS	vs. No. 2 (1) Stanford; Final	L 66–77	19–11	Staples Center (16,418); Los Angeles, California
NCAA tournament
Fri, March 19*; 6:30 pm, CBS	vs. (9S) UAB; First round	L 100–102	19–12	Nationwide Arena (19,588); Columbus, Ohio
*Non-conference game. ^{#}Rankings from AP poll. (#) Tournament seedings in parentheses. All times are in Pacific time.
