= 2003–04 Iowa State Cyclones men's basketball team =

American college basketball season

2003–04 Iowa State Cyclones men's basketball
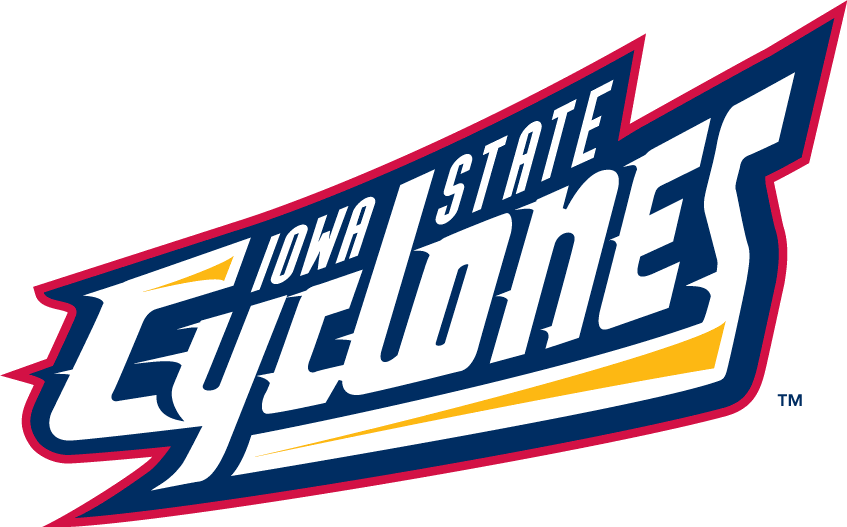

2004 NIT, Final Four
- Conference: Big 12 Conference
- Record: 20–13 (7–9 Big 12)
- Head coach: Wayne Morgan (1st season)
- Assistant coaches: Bob Sundvold; Fred Quartelbaum; Damon Archibold
- Home arena: Hilton Coliseum

2003–04 Big 12 men's basketball standings
	Conf.				Overall
Team	W		L	PCT	W		L	PCT
No. 4 Oklahoma State †	14	–	2	.875	31	–	4	.886
No. 12 Texas	12	–	4	.750	25	–	8	.758
No. 16 Kansas	12	–	4	.750	24	–	9	.727
Colorado	10	–	6	.625	18	–	11	.621
Texas Tech	9	–	7	.563	23	–	11	.676
Missouri	9	–	7	.563	16	–	14	.533
Oklahoma	8	–	8	.500	20	–	11	.645
Iowa State	7	–	9	.438	20	–	13	.606
Kansas State	6	–	10	.375	14	–	14	.500
Nebraska	6	–	10	.375	18	–	13	.581
Baylor	3	–	13	.188	8	–	21	.276
Texas A&M	0	–	16	.000	7	–	21	.250
† 2004 Big 12 Tournament winner Rankings from AP poll

The 2003–04 Iowa State Cyclones men's basketball team represented Iowa State University during the 2003–04 NCAA Division I men's basketball season. The Cyclones were coached by Wayne Morgan, who was in his first season. They played their home games at Hilton Coliseum in Ames, Iowa, and competed in the Big 12 Conference.

== Previous season ==
The Cyclones finished 17–14, 5–11 in Big 12 play to finish 9th in the regular season conference standings. They lost to Kansas in the quarterfinals of the Big 12 tournament. They received an at-large bid to the NIT tournament, where they defeated Wichita State and lost to Iowa.

On April 28, 2003, The Des Moines Register published pictures of head coach Larry Eustachy kissing several young women and holding a beer at a party near the University of Missouri's campus just hours after the Tigers defeated the Cyclones on January 22. The Register also reported that Eustachy had been seen at a fraternity party at Kansas State hours after his team lost to the Wildcats. During the scandal, the Register reported that Iowa State documents showed that the NCAA had cited Eustachy for rules violations related to paying players.

On April 30, 2003, athletic director Bruce Van De Velde suspended Eustachy with pay, and recommended that he be fired for violating a morals clause in his contract. Eustachy held a press conference in which he apologized for his behavior and admitted he had recently begun rehab treatment for alcoholism. He initially indicated he would contest the suspension. Instead, on May 5, he announced his resignation.

In the wake of the scandal, assistant coach Wayne Morgan was promoted to replace Eustachy as head coach.

== Incoming players ==
Incoming players
Name	Position	Height	Weight	Previous school	Hometown
Curtis Stinson	Guard	6'2"	205 lbs.	Winchendon Prep	The Bronx
Will Blalock	Guard	5'11"	185 lbs.	Notre Dame Prep	Boston
Damion Staple	Forward	6'8"	230 lbs.	Southeastern Illinois	Kingston, Jamaica
Jeff Bergstrom	Forward	6'4"	190 lbs.	Kingwood High	Kingwood, Houston, TX
Dave Braet	Guard	6'3"	185 lbs.	Calamus–Wheatland	Calamus, Iowa
Reggie George	Center	6'9"	230 lbs.	Notre Dame Prep	Chicago
Mark Boll	Forward	6'5"	210 lbs.	West Genesee	Syracuse, New York
Jonnell Marion	Guard	5'9"	150 lbs.	Valley	West Des Moines, Iowa

== Roster ==
2003–04 Iowa State Cyclones men's basketball team
Players
Coaches

Pos.	#	Name	Height	Weight	Year	Previous school	Hometown
G	0	Jake Sullivan (C)	6 ft 1 in (1.85 m)	195 lb (88 kg)	Sr	Tartan High	Oakdale, Minnesota
G	1	Curtis Stinson	6 ft 2 in (1.88 m)	205 lb (93 kg)	Fr	Winchendon Prep	The Bronx
G	3	John Neal	6 ft 3 in (1.91 m)	180 lb (82 kg)	So	Winterset High	Winterset, Iowa
F	4	Jackson Vroman	6 ft 10 in (2.08 m)	220 lb (100 kg)	Jr	Snow College	Bountiful, Utah
G	11	Will Blalock	5 ft 11 in (1.8 m)	185 lb (84 kg)	Fr	Notre Dame Prep	Boston
G	12	Tim Barnes	6 ft 0 in (1.83 m)	160 lb (73 kg)	Sr	Southeastern Illinois	Henderson, Kentucky
F	15	Adam Schaper	6 ft 9 in (2.06 m)	215 lb (98 kg)	Jr	Kankakee Valley	DeMotte, Indiana
F	22	Damion Staple	6 ft 8 in (2.03 m)	230 lb (104 kg)	Jr	Southeastern Illinois	Kingston, Jamaica
F	33	Mark Boll	6 ft 5 in (1.96 m)	210 lb (95 kg)	Fr	West Genesee	Syracuse, New York
F	34	Jeff Bergstrom	6 ft 4 in (1.93 m)	190 lb (86 kg)	Fr	Kingwood High	Kingwood, Texas
G	40	Dave Braet	6 ft 3 in (1.91 m)	185 lb (84 kg)	Sr	Calamus–Wheatland	Calamus, Iowa
C	41	Reggie George	6 ft 9 in (2.06 m)	230 lb (104 kg)	Fr	Notre Dame Prep	Chicago
G	42	Justin Fries	6 ft 2 in (1.88 m)	200 lb (91 kg)	RS Sr	Washington High	Sioux Falls, South Dakota
G/F	50	Marcus Jefferson (C)	6 ft 5 in (1.96 m)	205 lb (93 kg)	RS Sr	Notre Dame Prep	East Chicago
C	51	Jared Homan	6 ft 9 in (2.06 m)	230 lb (104 kg)	Jr	St. Mary's	Remsen, Iowa
C	54	Andrew Skoglund	7 ft 1 in (2.16 m)	250 lb (113 kg)	Sr	Hopkins High	Minnetonka, Minnesota

Head coach

- Wayne Morgan (St. Lawrence)

Assistant coach(es)

- Fred Quartlebaum (Fordham)
- Damon Archibald (Boise State)

Legend

- (C) Team captain
- (S) Suspended
- (I) Ineligible
- (W) Walk-on
- Injured
- Current redshirt

== Schedule and results ==
Date time, TV	Rank^{#}	Opponent^{#}	Result	Record	Site city, state
Exhibition
November 3, 2003*; 7:00 pm		L.A. Stars; Exhibition	W 81-61		Hilton Coliseum; Ames, Iowa
November 17, 2003*; 7:00 pm		Global Sports; Exhibition	W 91-83		Hilton Coliseum; Ames, Iowa
Regular season
November 28, 2003*; 7:00 pm		Mercer	W 87-64	1-0	Hilton Coliseum; Ames, Iowa
November 30, 2003*; 12:00 pm, Cyclone Television Network		UNI; Iowa Big Four	W 79-76	2-0	Hilton Coliseum; Ames, Iowa
December 5, 2003*; 7:30 pm		IPFW; Cyclone Challenge	W 78-51	3-0	Hilton Coliseum; Ames, Iowa
December 6, 2003*; 7:30 pm		Idaho State; Cyclone Challenge	W 73-47	4-0	Hilton Coliseum; Ames, Iowa
December 13, 2003*; 12:00 pm, Cyclone Television Network		Liberty	W 76-58	5-0	Hilton Coliseum; Ames, Iowa
December 20, 2003*; 7:05 pm, WOI/KFXA/KFXB/KWQC/KCAU/KIMT/Cox		at Drake; Iowa Big Four	W 83-77	6-0	Knapp Center; Des Moines, Iowa
December 23, 2003*; 7:00 pm, Cyclone Television Network		Xavier	W 68-61	7-0	Hilton Coliseum; Ames, Iowa
December 31, 2003*; 5:00 pm		at Virginia	L 74-85	7-1	University Hall
January 3, 2004*; 9:00 pm, 4SD		at San Diego State	L 76-86	7-2	Viejas Arena; San Diego
January 7, 2004; 7:00 pm, Cyclone Television Network		Missouri	W 70-65	8-2 (1-0)	Hilton Coliseum; Ames, Iowa
January 10, 2004; 7:00 pm, Cyclone Television Network		Nebraska	W 89-74	9-2 (2-0)	Hilton Coliseum; Ames, Iowa
January 12, 2004*; 6:30 pm, Cyclone Television Network		Northern Colorado	W 89-63	10-2 (2-0)	Hilton Coliseum; Ames, Iowa
January 17, 2004; 3:00 pm, ESPN Plus		at Colorado	L 70-88	10-3 (2-1)	Coors Events Center; Boulder, Colorado
January 21, 2004*; 7:05 pm, Cyclone Television Network		Iowa; Cy-Hawk Rivalry	W 84-76	11-3 (2-1)	Hilton Coliseum; Ames, Iowa
January 24, 2004; 7:05 pm, ESPN Plus		at Baylor	L 59-63	11-4 (2-2)	Ferrell Center; Waco, Texas
January 28, 2004; 6:30 pm, Cyclone Television Network		Texas A&M	W 91-82	12-4 (3-2)	Hilton Coliseum; Ames, Iowa
January 31, 2004; 3:00 pm, ESPN Plus		No. 15 Kansas	W 68-61	13-4 (4-2)	Hilton Coliseum; Ames, Iowa
February 4, 2004; 7:00 pm, ESPN Plus		at Oklahoma	L 48-75	13-5 (4-3)	Lloyd Noble Center; Norman, Oklahoma
February 7, 2004; 12:45 pm, ESPN Plus		No. 13 Oklahoma State	L 67-88	13-6 (4-4)	Hilton Coliseum; Ames, Iowa
February 11, 2004; 7:00 pm		at Kansas State	L 59-90	13-7 (4-5)	Bramlage Coliseum; Manhattan, Kansas
February 14, 2004; 3:00 pm, ESPN Plus		No. 11 Texas	W 78-77	14-7 (5-5)	Hilton Coliseum; Ames, Iowa
February 18, 2004; 7:00 pm, Cyclone Television Network		at Missouri	L 70-82	14-8 (5-6)	Hearnes Center; Columbia, Missouri
February 21, 2004; 3:00 pm, ESPN Plus		at No. 21 Kansas	L 89-90 ^{OT}	14-9 (5-7)	Allen Fieldhouse; Lawrence, Kansas
February 25, 2004; 7:00 pm, Cyclone Television Network		Kansas State	W 75-69	15-9 (6-7)	Hilton Coliseum; Ames, Iowa
February 28, 2004; 3:00 pm, ESPN Plus		at Nebraska	L 65-68	15-10 (6-8)	Bob Devaney Sports Center; Lincoln, Nebraska
March 3, 2004; 7:00P PM		Colorado	W 83-77	16-10 (7-8)	Hilton Coliseum; Ames, Iowa
March 6, 2004; 12:30 pm, ABC		at Texas Tech	L 58-72	16-11 (7-9)	United Spirit Arena; Lubbock, Texas
Big 12 Tournament
March 11, 2004; 2:00 pm, ESPN Plus		vs. Kansas State	W 78-64	17-11 (7-9)	American Airlines Center; Dallas
March 12, 2004; 12:00 pm, ESPN Plus		vs. No. 7 Oklahoma State	L 75-83	17-12 (7-9)	American Airlines Center; Dallas
NIT Tournament
March 17, 2004*; 8:30 pm, Mediacom		Georgia; NIT first round	W 82-74	18-12 (7-9)	Hilton Coliseum; Ames, Iowa
March 23, 2004*; 6:00 pm, Mediacom		at Florida State; NIT second round	W 62-59	19-12 (7-9)	Donald L. Tucker Center; Tallahassee, Florida
March 25, 2004*; 8:30 pm, Mediacom		Marquette; NIT Quarterfinals	W 77-69	20-12 (7-9)	Hilton Coliseum; Ames, Iowa
March 30, 2004; 6:00 pm, ESPN2		vs. Rutgers; NIT Semifinals	L 81-84 ^{OT}	20-13 (7-9)	Madison Square Garden; New York City
*Non-conference game. ^{#}Rankings from AP poll. (#) Tournament seedings in parentheses. All times are in Central Time.

== Awards and honors ==
- All-Conference Selections

Jackson Vroman (3rd Team)
Jake Sullivan (Honorable Mention)
Curtis Stinson (Honorable Mention)

- Conference Freshman of the Year

Curtis Stinson (2004)

- Academic All-Big 12 First Team

Jake Sullivan (2004)
Justin Fries (2004)

- Freshman All-American

Curtis Stinson (2004)

- Ralph A. Olsen Award

Curtis Stinson (2004)
Jackson Vroman (2004)
Jake Sullivan (2004)
