= 2003–04 Texas Tech Red Raiders basketball team =

American college basketball season

2003–04 Texas Tech Red Raiders basketball

NCAA tournament, second round
- Conference: Big 12 Conference
- South
- Record: 23–11 (9–7 Big 12)
- Head coach: Bob Knight (3rd season)
- Assistant coaches: Pat Knight (3rd season); Chris Beard (3rd season); Stew Robinson (1st season)
- Home arena: United Spirit Arena

2003–04 Big 12 men's basketball standings
	Conf.				Overall
Team	W		L	PCT	W		L	PCT
No. 4 Oklahoma State †	14	–	2	.875	31	–	4	.886
No. 12 Texas	12	–	4	.750	25	–	8	.758
No. 16 Kansas	12	–	4	.750	24	–	9	.727
Colorado	10	–	6	.625	18	–	11	.621
Texas Tech	9	–	7	.563	23	–	11	.676
Missouri	9	–	7	.563	16	–	14	.533
Oklahoma	8	–	8	.500	20	–	11	.645
Iowa State	7	–	9	.438	20	–	13	.606
Kansas State	6	–	10	.375	14	–	14	.500
Nebraska	6	–	10	.375	18	–	13	.581
Baylor	3	–	13	.188	8	–	21	.276
Texas A&M	0	–	16	.000	7	–	21	.250
† 2004 Big 12 Tournament winner Rankings from AP poll

The 2003–04 Texas Tech Red Raiders men's basketball team represented Texas Tech University in the Big 12 Conference during the 2003–04 NCAA Division I men's basketball season. The head coach was Bob Knight, his 3rd year with the team. The Red Raiders played their home games in the United Spirit Arena in Lubbock, Texas.

== Roster ==
2003–04 Texas Tech Red Raiders men's basketball team
Players
Coaches

Pos.	#	Name	Height	Weight	Year	Hometown
G	14	Andre Emmett	6 ft 5 in (1.96 m)	230 lb (104 kg)	Sr	Dallas, Texas
G	15	Ronald Ross	6 ft 2 in (1.88 m)	185 lb (84 kg)	Jr	Hobbs, New Mexico
G	22	Jarrius Jackson	6 ft 1 in (1.85 m)	175 lb (79 kg)	Fr	Monroe, Louisiana

Head coach

- Bob Knight (Ohio State)

Assistant coach(es)

- Pat Knight (Indiana)

Legend

- (C) Team captain
- (S) Suspended
- (I) Ineligible
- (W) Walk-on
- Injured
- Current redshirt

== Schedule and results ==
Date time, TV	Rank^{#}	Opponent^{#}	Result	Record	Site city, state
Regular Season
Nov 18, 2003*		Davidson	W 89–58	1–0	United Spirit Arena; Lubbock, Texas
Nov 21, 2003*		UMass; Preseason NIT	W 90–50	2–0	United Spirit Arena; Lubbock, Texas
Nov 23, 2003*		East Tennessee State; Preseason NIT	W 64–53	3–0	United Spirit Arena; Lubbock, Texas
Nov 26, 2003*		vs. Utah; Preseason NIT	W 65–54	4–0	Madison Square Garden; New York, New York
Nov 28, 2003*		vs. Georgia Tech; Preseason NIT	L 65–85	4–1	Madison Square Garden; New York, New York
Dec 1, 2003*		at SMU	L 59–62	4–2	Moody Coliseum; Dallas, Texas
Dec 3, 2003*		UTEP	W 70–57	5–2	United Spirit Arena; Lubbock, Texas
Dec 6, 2003*		at New Mexico	W 67–58	6–2	University Arena; Albuquerque, New Mexico
Dec 10, 2003*		TCU	W 67–60	7–2	United Spirit Arena; Lubbock, Texas
Dec 13, 2003*		San Diego State	W 78–68	8–2	United Spirit Arena; Lubbock, Texas
Dec 17, 2003*		Sam Houston State	W 97–63	9–2	United Spirit Arena; Lubbock, Texas
Dec 22, 2003*		vs. Iowa	W 65–59	10–2	American Airlines Center; Dallas, Texas
Jan 1, 2004*		Minnesota	W 90–73	11–2	United Spirit Arena; Lubbock, Texas
Jan 4, 2004*		at Ohio State	W 80–72	12–2	Value City Arena; Columbus, Ohio
Jan 10, 2004		Oklahoma State	W 83–62	13–2 (1–0)	United Spirit Arena; Lubbock, Texas
Mar 6, 2004		Iowa State	W 72–58	21–9 (9–7)	United Spirit Arena; Lubbock, Texas
Big 12 Tournament
Mar 12, 2004*		vs. Colorado; Quarterfinals	W 79–69	22–9	American Airlines Center; Dallas, Texas
Mar 13, 2004*		vs. No. 7 Oklahoma State; Semifinals	L 77–82	22–10	American Airlines Center; Dallas, Texas
NCAA Tournament
Mar 18, 2004*	(8 E)	vs. (9 E) Charlotte; First Round	W 76–73	23–10	HSBC Arena; Buffalo, New York
Mar 20, 2004*	(8 E)	vs. (1 E) No. 5 Saint Joseph's; Second Round	L 65–70	23–11	HSBC Arena; Buffalo, New York
*Non-conference game. ^{#}Rankings from AP Poll. (#) Tournament seedings in parentheses. All times are in Central Time.
