= 2003–04 Oklahoma State Cowboys basketball team =

American college basketball season

2003–04 Oklahoma State Cowboys basketball

Big 12 Regular Season Champions Big 12 tournament champions

NCAA Tournament, Final Four
- Conference: Big 12 Conference

Ranking
- Coaches: No. 4
- AP: No. 4
- Record: 31–4 (14–2 Big 12)
- Head coach: Eddie Sutton (14th season)
- Assistant coaches: Sean Sutton; Glynn Cyprien; James Dickey
- Home arena: Gallagher-Iba Arena

2003–04 Big 12 men's basketball standings
	Conf.				Overall
Team	W		L	PCT	W		L	PCT
No. 4 Oklahoma State †	14	–	2	.875	31	–	4	.886
No. 12 Texas	12	–	4	.750	25	–	8	.758
No. 16 Kansas	12	–	4	.750	24	–	9	.727
Colorado	10	–	6	.625	18	–	11	.621
Texas Tech	9	–	7	.563	23	–	11	.676
Missouri	9	–	7	.563	16	–	14	.533
Oklahoma	8	–	8	.500	20	–	11	.645
Iowa State	7	–	9	.438	20	–	13	.606
Kansas State	6	–	10	.375	14	–	14	.500
Nebraska	6	–	10	.375	18	–	13	.581
Baylor	3	–	13	.188	8	–	21	.276
Texas A&M	0	–	16	.000	7	–	21	.250
† 2004 Big 12 Tournament winner Rankings from AP poll

The 2003–04 Oklahoma State Cowboys men's basketball team represented Oklahoma State University in the 2003–04 NCAA Division I men's basketball season. The team was led by 14th-year head coach Eddie Sutton. In 2002–03, the Cowboys finished 22–10 (10–6 in the Big 12 Conference).

== Preseason ==
Four transfers became eligible to play for the Cowboys this season. Joey and Stevie Graham transferred from the University of Central Florida, Daniel Bobik transferred from BYU, and John Lucas III transferred from Baylor University but did not have to sit out the required year after the Baylor University basketball scandal.

== Regular season ==
The Cowboys won their first four games before traveling to BYU to take on Daniel Bobik's former team and Rafael Araújo, who gave the Cowboys their first setback of the year. After six more consecutive wins, OSU lost in a blowout in its conference game against Bob Knight's Texas Tech Red Raiders in Lubbock. The Cowboys then won 11 straight conference games before falling in double overtime to Missouri. Oklahoma State won the regular season conference championship, finishing with a record of 14–2. Until 2018–19, it was the last time a team other than the Kansas Jayhawks won the Big 12 regular-season championship outright. (Oklahoma State and Kansas shared the title in 2004–05.)

== Postseason ==
Oklahoma State followed up its regular season Big 12 Conference championship with the tournament championship. OSU received a #2 seed in the East Regional, where it defeated the #1 seed St. Joseph's University in the regional final with the game-winning shot coming from John Lucas III. At the Final Four, the Cowboys fell to Georgia Tech on a last-second shot by Will Bynum.

== Roster ==
Note: Flags indicate national team eligibility at FIBA sanctioned events. Players may hold other non-FIBA nationality not displayed.

No.		Position	Player
0	(United States)	F	Tremaine Fuqua
4	(South Africa)	C	Frans Steyn
5	(United States)	G/F	Marcus Dove
13	(Nigeria)	G	Guy Ikpah
14	(United States)	F	Joey Graham
15	(United States)	G	John Lucas
16	(United States)	G	Kenneth Meek
20	(United States)	G	Daniel Bobik
21	(United States)	G	Stephen Graham

No.		Position	Player
23	(United States)	F	Ivan McFarlin
24	(United States)	G	Tony Allen
25	(United States)	G	Janavor Weatherspoon
32	(United States)	F	David Monds
33	(United States)	F	Jason Miller
35	(United States)	G	Brandon Elliott
42	(United States)	F	Terrence Crawford

== Big 12 Conference standings ==
#	Team	Conference	Pct.	Overall	Pct.
1	Oklahoma State	14-2	.875	31-4	.886
2	Texas	12-4	.750	25-8	.758
3	Kansas	12-4	.750	24-9	.727
4	Colorado	10-6	.625	18-11	.621
5	Texas Tech	9-7	.563	23-11	.676
6	Missouri	9-7	.563	16-14	.533
7	Oklahoma	8-8	.500	20-11	.645
8	Iowa State	7-9	.438	20-13	.606
9	Kansas State	6-10	.375	14-14	.500
10	Nebraska	6-10	.375	18-13	.580
11	Baylor	3-13	.188	8-21	.276
12	Texas A&M	0-16	.000	7-21	.250

== Schedule ==
Date time, TV	Rank^{#}	Opponent^{#}	Result	Record	Site (attendance) city, state
Regular Season
11/21/2003*; 7:05 pm	No. 25	Northwestern State	W 90–62	1–0	Gallagher-Iba Arena (9,466); Stillwater, OK
11/26/2003*; 7:05 pm	No. 25	vs. Colorado State	W 84–63	2–0	Reynolds Center (7,163); Tulsa, OK
11/29/2003*; 7:05 pm	No. 24	Pepperdine	W 84–82	3–0	Gallagher-Iba Arena (10,040); Stillwater, OK
12/03/2003*; 7:05 pm	No. 25	Texas-San Antonio	W 83–53	4–0	Gallagher-Iba Arena (9,450); Stillwater, OK
12/06/2003*; 4:08 pm	No. 25	vs. Brigham Young	L 76–71	4–1	Delta Center (16,285); Salt Lake City, UT
12/16/2003*; 7:05 pm		Southeastern Oklahoma State	W 93–46	5–1	Gallagher-Iba Arena; Stillwater, OK
12/20/2003*; 4:05 pm		at Arkansas	W 73–58	6–1	Bud Walton Arena (18,917); Fayetteville, AR
12/22/2003*; 7:05 pm		Texas–Pan American	W 96–61	7–1	Gallagher-Iba Arena (7,613); Stillwater, OK
12/30/2003*; 7:05 pm		Samford	W 65–50	8–1	Gallagher-Iba Arena (8,670); Stillwater, OK
1/03/2004*; 6:35 pm		vs. Southern Methodist	W 89–54	9–1	Ford Center (9,760); Oklahoma City, OK
01/06/2004*; 7:05 pm		Texas A&M-Corpus Christi	W 84–52	10–1	Gallagher-Iba Arena (8,520); Stillwater, OK
01/10/2004; 3:00 pm		at Texas Tech	L 83–62	10–2 (0–1)	United Spirit Arena (13,043); Lubbock, TX
01/14/2004; 7:04 pm		No. 11 Oklahoma	W 77–56	11–2 (1–1)	Gallagher-Iba Arena (13,611); Stillwater, OK
01/17/2004; 6:04 pm		at Kansas State	W 57–56	12–2 (2–1)	Bramlage Coliseum (10,839); Manhattan, KS
01/21/2004; 7:05 pm	No. 24	Colorado	W 71–62	13–2 (3–1)	Gallagher-Iba Arena (11,839); Stillwater, OK
01/24/2004; 3:00 pm, ESPN	No. 24	at No. 16 Texas	W 72–67	14–2 (4–1)	Frank Erwin Center (16,221); Austin, TX
01/31/2004; 8:04 pm	No. 18	No. 13 Texas Tech	W 70–66	15–2 (5–1)	Gallagher-Iba Arena (13,611); Stillwater, OK
02/03/2004; 7:05 pm	No. 13	at Texas A&M	W 91–79	16–2 (6–1)	Reed Arena (6,021); College Station, TX
02/07/2004; 12:47 pm, ESPN Plus	No. 13	at Iowa State	W 88–67	17–2 (7–1)	Hilton Coliseum (12,240); Ames, IA
02/09/2004; 8:05 pm, ESPN	No. 10	No. 12 Kansas	W 80–60	18–2 (8–1)	Gallagher-Iba Arena (13,611); Stillwater, OK
02/14/2004; 3:03 pm	No. 10	Baylor	W 91–58	19–2 (9–1)	Gallagher-Iba Arena (11,449); Stillwater, OK
02/16/2004; 8:05 pm	No. 7	at Oklahoma	W 65–52	20–2 (10–1)	Lloyd Noble Center (12,628); Norman, OK
02/21/2004; 7:00 pm	No. 7	at Nebraska	W 87–83 ^{OT}	21–2 (11–1)	Gallagher-Iba Arena (12,854); Stillwater, OK
02/24/2004; 7:04 pm	No. 6	at Missouri	L 93–92 ^{OT}	21–3 (11–2)	Hearnes Center (13,233); Columbia, MO
02/28/2004; 3:03 pm	No. 6	at Baylor	W 72–65	22–3 (12–2)	Ferrell Center; Waco, TX
03/01/2004; 8:05 pm, ESPN	No. 8	No. 10 Texas	W 76–67	23–3 (13–2)	Gallagher-Iba Arena (13,611); Stillwater, OK
03/06/2004; 12:47 pm	No. 8	Texas A&M	W 70–41	24–3 (14–2)	Gallagher-Iba Arena (12,686); Stillwater, OK
2004 Big 12 men's basketball tournament
03/12/2004; 12:07 pm, ESPN Plus	No. 7	vs. Iowa State; Quarterfinals	W 83–75	25–3	American Airlines Center (17,267); Dallas, TX
03/13/2004; 1:07 pm, ESPN2	No. 7	vs. Texas Tech; Semifinals	W 82–77	26–3	American Airlines Center (19,100); Dallas, TX
03/14/2004; 2:15 pm, ESPN	No. 7	vs. No. 11 Texas; Championship	W 65–49	27–3	American Airlines Center (17,324); Dallas, TX
NCAA Division I men's basketball tournament
03/19/2004*; 2:22 pm, CBS	No. 4 (2 seed)	vs. Eastern Washington; First Round	W 75–56	28–3	Kemper Arena (16,840); Kansas City, MO
03/21/2004*; 1:20 am, CBS	No. 4 (2)	vs. No. 24 Memphis; Second Round	W 70–53	29–3	Kemper Arena (17,667); Kansas City, MO
03/25/2004*; 7:27 am, CBS	No. 4 (2)	vs. No. 9 Pittsburgh; Sweet Sixteen	W 63–51	30–3	Continental Airlines Arena (19,557); East Rutherford, NJ
03/27/2004*; 7:05 am, CBS	No. 4 (2)	vs. No. 5 St. Joseph's; Elite Eight	W 64–62	31–3	Meadowlands Arena (19,779); East Rutherford, NJ
04/03/2004*; 5:07 am, CBS	No. 4 (2)	vs. No. 14 Georgia Tech; Final Four	L 67–65	31–4	Alamodome (44,417); San Antonio, TX
*Non-conference game. ^{#}Rankings from AP Poll. (#) Tournament seedings in parentheses. All times are in CST.

== Team players drafted into the NBA ==
Round	Pick	Player	NBA club
1	16	Joey Graham	Toronto Raptors
1	25	Tony Allen	Boston Celtics
