= 2003–04 Washington State Cougars men's basketball team =

American college basketball season

2003–04 Washington State Cougars men's basketball
- Conference: Pacific-10 Conference
- Record: 13–16 (7–11 Pac-10)
- Head coach: Dick Bennett (1st season)
- Assistant coach: Tony Bennett
- Home arena: Beasley Coliseum

2003–04 Pacific-10 Conference men's basketball standings
| | Conf. | | | | Overall |
| Team | W | | L | PCT | W | | L | PCT |
|---|---|---|---|---|---|---|---|---|
| No. 6 Stanford† | 17 | – | 1 | .944 | 30 | – | 2 | .938 |
| Washington | 12 | – | 6 | .667 | 19 | – | 12 | .613 |
| Arizona | 11 | – | 7 | .611 | 20 | – | 10 | .667 |
| Oregon | 9 | – | 9 | .500 | 18 | – | 13 | .581 |
| California | 9 | – | 9 | .500 | 13 | – | 15 | .464 |
| USC | 8 | – | 10 | .444 | 13 | – | 15 | .464 |
| Washington State | 7 | – | 11 | .389 | 13 | – | 16 | .448 |
| UCLA | 7 | – | 11 | .389 | 11 | – | 17 | .393 |
| Oregon State | 6 | – | 12 | .333 | 12 | – | 16 | .429 |
| Arizona State | 4 | – | 14 | .222 | 10 | – | 17 | .370 |
† Conference tournament winner As of April 4, 2004; Rankings from Coaches Poll

The 2003–04 Washington State Cougars men's basketball team represented Washington State University for the 2003–04 NCAA Division I men's basketball season. Led by third-year head coach Dick Bennett, the Cougars were members of the Pacific-10 Conference and played their home games on campus at Beasley Coliseum in Pullman, Washington.

The Cougars were 13–15 overall in the regular season and 7–11 in conference play, tied for seventh in the standings.

Seeded eighth in the conference tournament, the Cougars met top seed and second-ranked Stanford in the quarterfinal round and lost by 21 points.

Bennett was hired in March 2003; he was formerly the head coach at Wisconsin.

== Postseason result ==
| Date time, TV | Opponent | Result | Record | Site (attendance) city, state |
Pacific-10 Tournament
| Thu, March 8; 12:15 pm, FSN | vs. No. 2 (1) Stanford; Quarterfinal | L 47–68 | 13–16 | Staples Center; Los Angeles, California |
*Non-conference game. ^{#}Rankings from AP poll. (#) Tournament seedings in parentheses. All times are in Pacific time.
