= DirecTV Classic =

American College Basketball Tournament

- Sport: Men's college basketball
- Founded: 2007
- Folded: 2012
- Replaced by: Wooden Legacy
- No. of teams: 8
- Country: United States
- Venues: Anaheim Convention Center, Anaheim, California
- Last champion: California

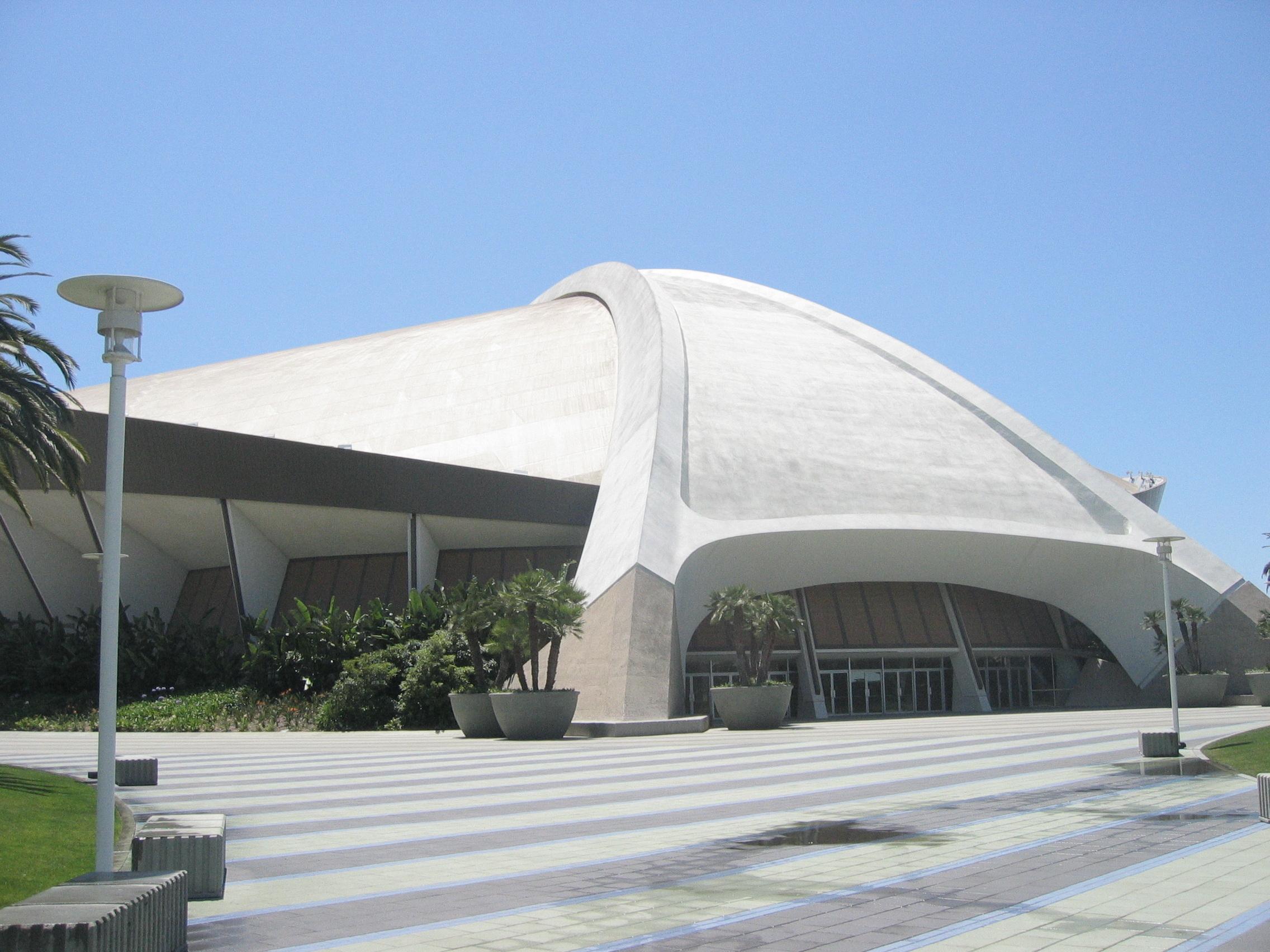
Arena facility of the Anaheim Convention Center. Anaheim, CA, USA.

The DirecTV Classic was an eight-team college basketball tournament held during Thanksgiving week at the Anaheim Convention Center in Anaheim, California. The tournament began in 2007, and was owned and operated by ESPN Regional Television. Games were televised on ESPN2 and ESPNU. Until 2012, it was known as the "76 Classic"; ConocoPhillips's 76 chain owned the naming rights to the tournament. DirecTV sponsored the 2012 tournament. In 2013, the event merged with the Wooden Classic to form a new event, the Wooden Legacy.

== Yearly champions, runners-up, and MVPs ==
Year	Winner	Score	Opponent	Tournament MVP
2007	USC*	70–45	Southern Illinois	O. J. Mayo, USC
2008	Wake Forest	87–74	Baylor	James Harden, Arizona State
2009	West Virginia	84–66	Portland	Da'Sean Butler, West Virginia
2010	UNLV	67–58	Virginia Tech	Chace Stanback, UNLV
2011	Saint Louis	59–57	Oklahoma	Brian Conklin, Saint Louis
2012	California	78–58	Pacific	

* – On January 3, 2010, USC announced it would punish the men's basketball program for rules violations committed during the 2007–08 season, when O. J. Mayo received improper benefits in violation of NCAA rules. All wins during the 2007–08 season were vacated.

=== All Tournament Teams ===
==== 2007 ====
- O. J. Mayo, USC - Tournament MVP
- Randal Falker, Southern Illinois
- Michael Bramos, Miami (Ohio)
- Tim Pollitz, Miami (Ohio)
- Jamont Gordon, Mississippi State

==== 2008 ====
- James Harden, Arizona State
- Jeff Teague, Wake Forest - Tournament MVP
- Curtis Jerrells, Baylor
- Patrick Mills, Saint Mary's
- Stefon Jackson, UTEP

==== 2009 ====
- Da'Sean Butler, West Virginia - Tournament MVP
- Kevin Jones, West Virginia
- Gordon Hayward, Butler
- T.J. Robinson, Long Beach State
- T. J. Campbell, Portland

==== 2010 ====
- Chace Stanback, UNLV - Tournament MVP
- Malcolm Delaney, Virginia Tech
- Marshall Moses, Oklahoma State
- Justin Hurtt, Tulsa
- Lenny Daniel, Cal State Northridge

==== 2011 ====
- Brian Conklin, Saint Louis - Tournament MVP
- Kwamain Mitchell, Saint Louis
- Steven Pledger, Oklahoma
- Evan Roquemore, Santa Clara
- Maalik Wayns, Villanova

== Brackets ==
* – Denotes overtime period

=== 2012 ===
5th Place Game; Sunday, November 25
Xavier	74
Drake	70
7th Place Game; Sunday, November 25
Drexel	55
Rice	47

Consolation 2nd Round; Friday, November 23
Xavier	69
Drexel	65
Rice	66
Drake	77

First Round; Thursday, November 22
Pacific	70
Xavier	67
Drexel	64
Saint Mary's	76
Rice	36
Georgia Tech	54
Drake	70
California	73

Semifinals; Friday, November 23
Pacific	76
Saint Mary's	66
Georgia Tech	57
California	68

Championship; Sunday, November 25
Pacific	58
California	78
3rd Place Game; Sunday, November 25
Saint Mary's	56
Georgia Tech	65

=== 2011 ===
5th Place Game; Sunday, November 27
Boston College	57
New Mexico	75
7th Place Game; Sunday, November 27
UC Riverside	64
Washington State	63

Consolation 2nd Round; Friday, November 25
Boston College	66*
UC Riverside	62
'New Mexico	72
Washington State	62

First Round; Thursday, November 24
Boston College	51
Saint Louis	62
Villanova	76
UC Riverside	41
New Mexico	76
Santa Clara	79*
Oklahoma	74
Washington State	59

Semifinals; Friday, November 25
Saint Louis	80
Villanova	68
Santa Clara	73
Oklahoma	85

Championship; Sunday, November 27
Saint Louis	83
Oklahoma	63
3rd Place Game; Sunday, November 27
Villanova	64
Santa Clara	65

=== 2010 ===
5th Place Game; Sunday, November 28
Tulsa	80
Cal State Northridge	63
7th Place Game; Sunday, November 28
DePaul	74
Stanford	81*

Consolation 2nd Round; Friday, November 26
DePaul	66
Cal State Northridge	88
Stanford	53
Tulsa	65

First Round; Thursday, November 25
Virginia Tech	72
Cal State Northridge	56
DePaul	56
Oklahoma State	60
Murray State	55
Stanford	52
Tulsa	71
UNLV	80

Semifinals; Friday, November 26
Virginia Tech	56
Oklahoma State	51
Murray State	55
UNLV	69

Championship; Sunday, November 28
Virginia Tech	59
UNLV	71
3rd Place Game; Sunday, November 28
Oklahoma State	66
Murray State	49

=== 2009 ===
5th Place Game; November 29
19	Clemson	70
10	Butler	69
7th Place Game; November 29
Long Beach State	79
UCLA	68

Consolation 2nd Round; November 27
19	Clemson	87
Long Beach State	79
10	Butler	69
UCLA	67

First Round; November 26
8	West Virginia	85
Long Beach State	62
Texas A&M	69
19	Clemson	60
16	Minnesota	82
10	Butler	73
Portland	74
UCLA	47

Semifinals; November 27
8	West Virginia	73
Texas A&M	66
16	Minnesota	56
Portland	61

Championship; November 29
8	West Virginia	84
Portland	66
3rd Place Game; November 29
Texas A&M	66
16	Minnesota	65

=== 2008 ===
5th Place Game; November 30
Saint Mary's	81
Providence	75
7th Place Game; November 30
Cal State Fullerton	92
Charlotte	84

Consolation 2nd Round; November 28
Saint Mary's	79
Cal State Fullerton	54
Charlotte	62
Providence	67

First Round; November 27
Saint Mary's	62
UTEP	75
24	Wake Forest	75
Cal State Fullerton	69
14	Arizona State	84
Charlotte	56
Providence	56
Baylor	72

Semifinals; November 28
UTEP	79
24	Wake Forest	82
14	Arizona State	78
Baylor	87

Championship; November 30
24	Wake Forest	87
Baylor	74
3rd Place Game; November 30
UTEP	58
14	Arizona State	88

=== 2007 ===
5th Place Game; November 24
Chattanooga	67
South Alabama	84
7th Place Game; November 24
UC Irvine	57
San Diego	60

Consolation 2nd Round; November 23
UC Irvine	80
Chattanooga	85
South Alabama	77
San Diego	55

First Round; November 22
Mississippi State	68
UC Irvine	53
Chattanooga	63
18	Southern Illinois	71
Miami (Ohio)	64
South Alabama	59
San Diego	50
USC	60

Semifinals; November 23
Mississippi State	49
18	Southern Illinois	63
Miami (Ohio)	53
USC	57

Championship; November 24
18	Southern Illinois	45
USC	70
3rd Place Game; November 24
Mississippi State	60
Miami (Ohio)	67
