= Wooden Classic =

John R. Wooden Classic
- Sport: Men's college basketball
- Founded: 1994
- Folded: 2013
- Replaced by: Wooden Legacy
- No. of teams: 4
- Country: United States
- Venues: Honda Center, Anaheim, California

The John R. Wooden Classic was an annual college basketball event hosted by the Honda Center in Anaheim, California. Named after coach John Wooden, the event was founded in 1994 and featured a December neutral-site doubleheader until its final two editions, which were single games.

The event was merged in 2013 with the DirecTV Classic, an eight-team, three-day tournament, to form a new event, the Wooden Legacy (now Vegas Showdown).

== History ==
The John R. Classic was founded in 1994 by Atherton Communications in honor of the former Hall of Fame Purdue player and UCLA head coach John Wooden. The inaugural event was nationally televised by NBC Sports and featured four top 10 teams, including the first meeting in 20 years between UCLA and Kentucky, when they played for the 1975 NCAA Championship (won by UCLA), which marked John Wooden's 10th national title and the final game of his illustrious coaching career.

The Wooden Classic grew to include a charity golf tournament and coaches banquet, which raised over $1 million for Children's Hospital and Special Olympics, two of Coach Wooden's favorite charities. The 1998 and 1999 events also included the John R. Wooden Classic High School Invitational, which featured future NBA players, Tyson Chandler (Dominguez), Keith Bogans (DeMatha Catholic), Joe Forte (DeMatha Catholic) and Casey Jacobsen (Glendora).

The Classic was historically a high-profile doubleheader invitational event in early December. After Wooden died in 2010, it became a single game in January in the 2011–12 season due to scheduling conflicts and the transition to the event's new owners, Honda Center. The classic returned to December in the 2012–13 season, but was again a single game. Since its inception, the games were played in Anaheim, California, at the Honda Center, known earlier as the Arrowhead Pond of Anaheim. In June 2013, the Wooden Classic merged with the DirecTV Classic to form the Wooden Legacy, a three-day, eight-team event.

== Results ==
Date	Winner	Score	Opponent
12/01/2012	San Diego State	78–69	UCLA
01/05/2011	UCLA	65–58	Arizona
12/18/2010	Saint Mary's	82–74	Long Beach State
12/18/2010	UCLA	86–79	BYU
12/12/2009	Georgetown	74–66	Washington
12/12/2009	Mississippi State	72–54	UCLA
12/12/2008	Saint Mary's	67–64	San Diego State
12/12/2008	UCLA	72–54	DePaul
12/08/2007	Saint Mary's	69–64	San Diego State
12/08/2007	UCLA	75–63	Davidson
12/09/2006	UCLA	65–62	Texas A&M
12/09/2006	USC	74–65	George Washington
12/10/2005	Washington	81–71	New Mexico
12/10/2005	UCLA	67–56	Nevada
12/05/2004	Arizona	68–64	Mississippi State
12/05/2004	Boston College	74–64	UCLA
12/06/2003	Stanford	64–58	Kansas
12/06/2003	Kentucky	52–50	UCLA
12/07/2002	Georgia	78–73*	Cal
12/07/2002	Missouri	78–72	USC
12/08/2001	Arizona	79–66	Purdue
12/08/2001	UCLA	79–57	Alabama
12/02/2000	USC	65–60	Utah
12/02/2000	Georgia Tech	72–67	UCLA
11/27/1999	Stanford	67–58	Auburn
11/27/1999	Duke	81–68	USC
12/05/1998	Kansas	62–55	Pepperdine
12/05/1998	UCLA	69–66	Oklahoma State
12/06/1997	UCLA	69–58	New Mexico
12/06/1997	Stanford	76–74	Georgia
12/07/1996	Arizona	69–61	Utah
12/07/1996	Louisville	93–87*	LSU
12/09/1995	Villanova	67–50	Purdue
12/09/1995	UCLA	73–63	Maryland
12/03/1994	Kansas	81–75	Massachusetts
12/03/1994	UCLA	82–81	Kentucky

== All-time team records ==
Rank	School	Wins	Losses
1	UCLA	11	5
2	San Diego State	4	2
т-3	Saint Mary's	3	0
т-3	Stanford	3	0
5	Arizona	3	1
6	Kansas	2	1
7	USC	2	2
т-8	Boston College	1	0
т-8	Duke	1	0
т-8	Georgia Tech	1	0
т-8	Louisville	1	0
т-8	Missouri	1	0
т-8	Villanova	1	0
т-8	Washington	1	0
т-15	Georgia	1	1
т-15	Kentucky	1	1
т-17	Alabama	0	1
т-17	Auburn	0	1
т-17	California	0	1
т-17	Davidson	0	1
т-17	George Washington	0	1
т-17	LSU	0	1
т-17	Maryland	0	1
т-17	UMass	0	1
т-17	Mississippi State	0	1
т-17	Nevada	0	1
т-17	Oklahoma State	0	1
т-17	Pepperdine	0	1
т-17	Texas A&M	0	1
т-30	New Mexico	0	2
т-30	Purdue	0	2
т-30	Utah	0	2
