= 2004 Pacific-10 Conference men's basketball tournament =

- Classification: Division I
- Season: 2003–04
- Teams: 8
- Site: Staples Center; Los Angeles, California
- Champions: Stanford (1st title)
- Winning coach: Mike Montgomery (1st title)
- MVP: Josh Childress (Stanford)
- Attendance: 60,126

2003–04 Pacific-10 Conference men's basketball standings
	Conf.				Overall
Team	W		L	PCT	W		L	PCT
No. 6 Stanford†	17	–	1	.944	30	–	2	.938
Washington	12	–	6	.667	19	–	12	.613
Arizona	11	–	7	.611	20	–	10	.667
Oregon	9	–	9	.500	18	–	13	.581
California	9	–	9	.500	13	–	15	.464
USC	8	–	10	.444	13	–	15	.464
Washington State	7	–	11	.389	13	–	16	.448
UCLA	7	–	11	.389	11	–	17	.393
Oregon State	6	–	12	.333	12	–	16	.429
Arizona State	4	–	14	.222	10	–	17	.370
† Conference tournament winner As of April 4, 2004; Rankings from Coaches Poll

The 2004 Pacific Life Pacific-10 Conference men's basketball tournament was played between March 11 and March 13, 2004, at Staples Center in Los Angeles, California. The Washington Huskies made their second trip to the final game (and their first since 1987) to play Stanford who was making their third finals appearance. The champion of the tournament was Stanford (who was also the Pac-10 regular season champion), which received the Pac-10's automatic bid to the NCAA tournament. The Most Outstanding Player was Josh Childress of Stanford. The total attendance of 60,126 was the lowest since the tournament had been hosted at the Staples Center from 2002.

== Seeds ==
The top eight Pacific-10 schools play in the tournament. Teams are seeded by conference record, with a tiebreaker system used to seed teams with identical conference records.

Seed	School	Conference Record	Tiebreaker
1	Stanford	17–1	
2	Washington	12–6	
3	Arizona	11–7	
4	California	9–9	
5	Oregon	9–9	
6	USC	8–10	
7	UCLA	7–11	
8	Washington State	7–11	

== Bracket ==
First Round (March 11)
1	#2 Stanford	68
8	Washington State	47
4	California	82
5	Oregon	87
3	#21 Arizona	76
6	USC	73
2	Washington	91
7	UCLA	83

Semifinals (March 12)
1	#2 Stanford	70
5	Oregon	63
3	#21 Arizona	85
2	Washington	90

Finals (March 13)
1	#2 Stanford	77
2	Washington	66

== Tournament notes ==
- Stanford was the first 1 seed to win the tournament since Arizona had in 1989.
- This was also Stanford's first (and only) 1 seed in the Pac-10 Tournament and their only tournament championship.
- Upsets were all but non-existent in this tournament, with only the 5 seed beating the 4 seed in the first round.
- Oregon and Cal combined for 19 3-pt. field goals which set a then tournament record (13 and 6). This record would be later broken in 2012.
- Like the previous year, no teams met their arch-rival in this tournament.
- Washington State was in this tournament for the first time in 14 years, marking the longest drought of any conference team to participate.

== All tournament team ==
- Josh Childress, Stanford – Tournament MVP
- Hassan Adams, Arizona
- Luke Jackson, Oregon
- Andre Joseph, Oregon
- Matt Lottich, Stanford
- Nate Robinson, Washington
