= Hec Edmundson Pavilion =

Indoor arena in Seattle, Washington, United States

- Hec Ed
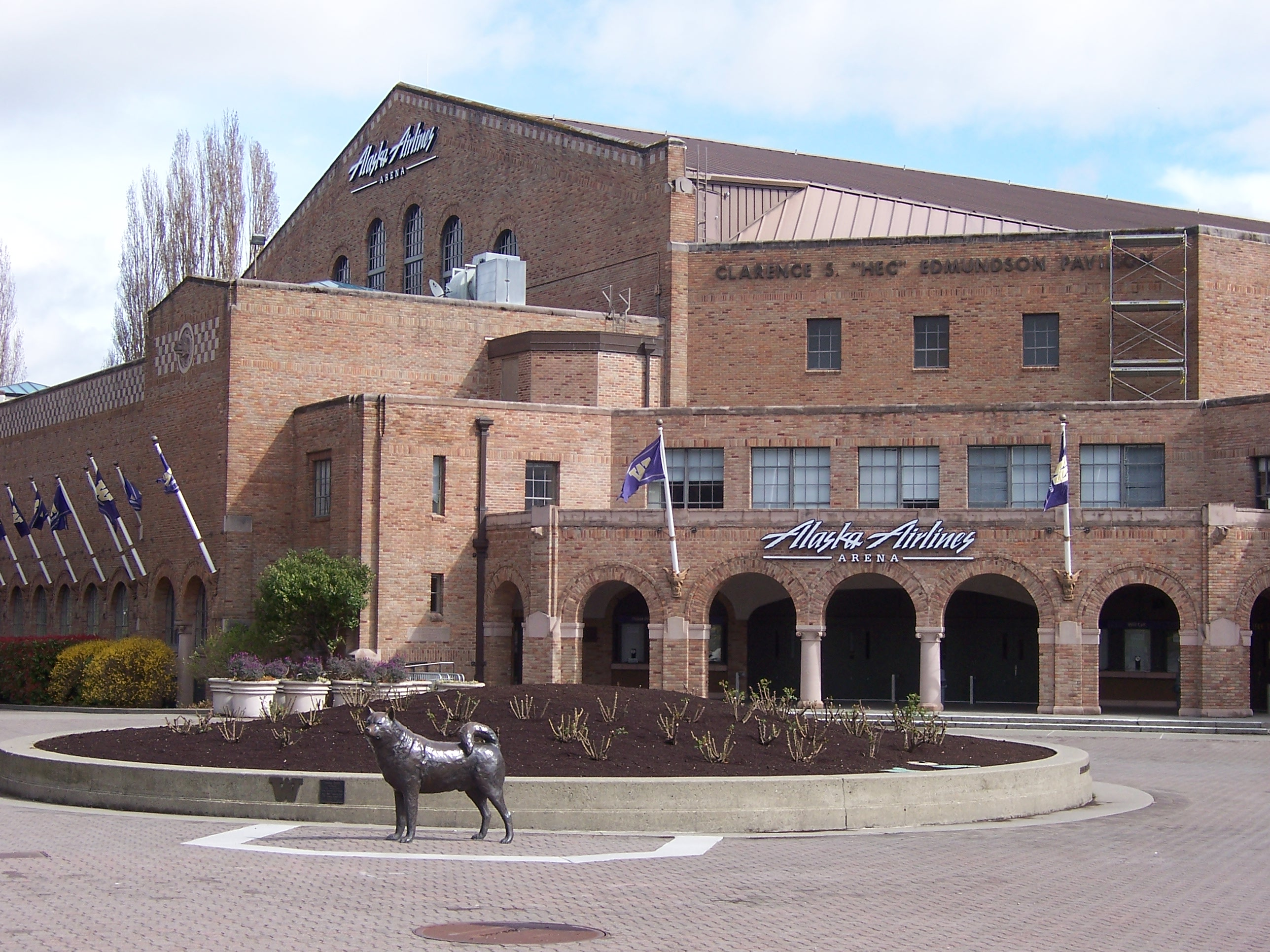
- Southwest entrance in March 2012

- Location in the United States Location in Washington
- Interactive map of Hec Edmundson Pavilion
- Full name: Alaska Airlines Arena at Hec Edmundson Pavilion (2011–present)
- Former names: Bank of America Arena at Hec Edmundson Pavilion (2000–2010); Hec Edmundson Pavilion (1948–1999); University of Washington Pavilion (1927–1948)
- Address: 3870 Montlake Boulevard
- Location: University of Washington; Seattle, Washington, U.S.
- Coordinates: 47.652°N 122.302°W
- Owner: University of Washington
- Operator: University of Washington
- Capacity: 10,000 - (2000–present); 7,900 - (1927–1999) - variable 12,961 - record (1957)
- Public transit: University of Washington

Construction
- Groundbreaking: March 29, 1927
- Opened: December 27, 1927; 98 years ago November 24, 2000; 25 years ago (renovation)
- Renovated: 1999–2000
- Cost: $600,000 - (original) - 1927 $40 million - (renovation) - 2000
- Architect: LMN Architects (renovation)

Tenants
- Washington Huskies (NCAA); 1927–1999, 2000–present Seattle Storm (WNBA) 2019

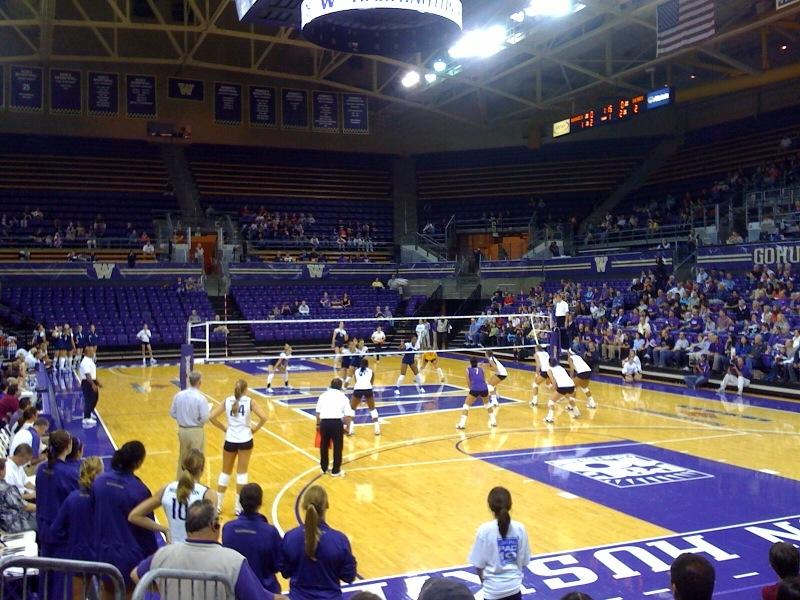
UW volleyball vs. Cal on October 3, 2008

Alaska Airlines Arena at Hec Edmundson Pavilion (formerly and still commonly referred to as Hec Edmundson Pavilion or simply Hec Ed) is an indoor arena on the campus of the University of Washington in Seattle, Washington. It serves as home to several of the university's sports teams, known as the Washington Huskies of the Big Ten Conference.

Originally opened in late 1927 as the University of Washington Pavilion, the brick venue is home to the UW men's and women's basketball programs, as well as the women's volleyball and gymnastics teams. The current seating capacity is 10,000 for basketball.

== History ==
=== Early history ===
The pavilion is located immediately north of Husky Stadium, bounded on the west by Montlake Boulevard. Originally the University of Washington Pavilion, the building was constructed in nine months in 1927 for $600,000 and opened on December 27. After 20 years, it was renamed the Hec Edmundson Pavilion on January 16, 1948, honoring the university's longtime track and basketball coach. An Olympian in 1912 in the 400 and 800 meters, Edmundson (1886–1964) had stepped down the previous spring after 27 seasons as head basketball coach and continued as head track coach through the 1954 season.

The building was designed as a multi-purpose field house, handling six or seven sports (men's), including use as an indoor football field and track. Seating and flooring were intentionally mobile, and the floor was originally dirt; the football team practiced in the venue during bad weather. The basketball floor was laid over a bed of 2x4s, resulting in a variety of bounce characteristics.

Hec Ed originally had glass skylights in its ceiling; during the state high school basketball tournament in 1938, one of these fell during a windstorm and injured two adults, resulting in their permanent removal. The pavilion was used as a venue for the 1990 Goodwill Games and the flooring was renovated for the event.

=== Renovation ===
After more than 71 years, the multi-purpose arena underwent a major renovation in March 1999, following the final home games of the basketball season. The project took 19 months to complete and cost $40 million. The expansive interior of the building was reconfigured by LMN Architects to make the arena environment more intimate for fans and players, and to improve the usage of the building's overall space.

The east end of the building was sectioned off into a practice gymnasium and the main basketball court was moved 50 feet (15 m) west, enclosed by a tighter bowl of seats. The seating capacity was increased from 7,900 to 10,000 while using significantly less of the building. Half of the seats (5,000) are the chair type, with the other half bleachers, of which 60% have backs. The seats were supplied by Saxton Bradley, Inc., a local distribution company for educational, technology, and casework solutions.

Another major improvement was the removal of the 20 view-obscuring support pillars in the upper level, replaced by two massive non-obscuring "super trusses," above and behind the sidelines. Both are 243 feet (74 m) in length and painted yellow-gold, as are the supporting tri-leg columns in the arena's four corners, proudly exhibited in the concourses.

Additionally, the six large arched windows at the west end of the building were uncovered. Painted over for years, they were refitted with filtered glass to allow them to remain uncovered during games. The acoustical ceiling, installed in 1967 for use as a concert and music hall, was removed to expose the steel rafters. The rafters and the black ceiling above them were painted in an off-white buff tone.

New locker rooms, athletic offices, meeting rooms, training rooms, and a Hall of Fame section were also part of the project. The running track was removed, transferred to the new Dempsey indoor practice facility, which opened the following autumn.

During the renovation, the Husky basketball teams were displaced for one season (1999–2000), and played their home games 5 miles (8.0 km) away at Seattle Center; the men at KeyArena and the women at Mercer Arena.

=== Proposed basketball training facility ===
In 2011, the university announced plans for a new basketball training facility. The project includes a pre-design study for a $50 million basketball training facility for the men's and Women's basketball programs to be located in the vicinity of the Alaska Airlines Arena. The scope of work may include relocation and replacement of existing ICA facilities related to the new project. The pre-design study will include programming, alternatives, design concepts, cost estimates, and other related reports. The study may include an option to replace or build a new arena for the basketball programs. Nothing has come of these plans since this announcement.

=== New volleyball floor ===
Following the volleyball team's final four season of 2013, a Taraflex surface was installed for volleyball in the summer of 2014. Used for major international competitions, such as the Olympics and world championships, it is composed of vinyl and foam with a thickness of 7 mm (0.28 in). Washington was the ninth Division I school to install Taraflex and the first in the Pac-12 Conference.

=== Seattle SuperSonics games ===
The arena was the site of a few Seattle SuperSonics games. The NBA team played six regular season games there during the 1970-71 season. In 1980, the Sonics played two games during the Western Conference finals against the Los Angeles Lakers and lost both. They played their two home games of the first round of the 1987 playoffs against the Dallas Mavericks and won both, including the series clincher. The Sonics had to play these playoff series at Hec Edmundson because both the Seattle Center Coliseum and the Kingdome were booked for other events.

=== Seattle Storm ===
The arena has hosted the city's WNBA team, the Seattle Storm, during the 2019 season. The Storm, which normally play at Seattle Center Arena, were temporarily displaced during that venue's renovation into a home for the Seattle Kraken. The Storm split the 2019 WNBA season, playing several games at Angel of the Winds Arena. The team originally planned to play the first ten games of its 2020 home schedule at Hec Ed, between May 15 and July 5, 2020, moving to Angel of the Winds Arena for the second half of the season, but had ended up playing a shortened 22-game season in Bradenton, Florida (as with all WNBA teams that year) because of the COVID-19 pandemic. The WNBA's original schedule included a month-long break in July and August 2020 to allow players to participate in the 2020 Summer Olympics in Tokyo; however, they were postponed until the next year (2021) owing to the pandemic. The WNBA had started their 2020 season in July.

Since the arena lacks air conditioning, and the WNBA requires that all games be played in air-conditioned venues, portable air conditioning units have been used during Storm games.

== Sponsors ==
At the reopening in November 2000, the title "Bank of America Arena" was added, following a payment of $9.1 million by Bank of America for the 10-year naming rights. (When the naming rights were originally awarded in June 1998, it was to be called "Seafirst Arena." Although Seafirst was acquired in 1983 by B of A, the name continued to be used until 1999, when Bank of America retired the brand.) The sponsorship of the arena expired after ten years in 2010 and was without an immediate successor. After several unsponsored months, the university announced its approval of Seattle-based Alaska Airlines as the new sponsor of Hec Ed on January 20, 2011.

== Milestones ==
- Hec Ed has hosted the NCAA basketball Final Four twice, in 1949 (no semifinals) and 1952 (the first "Final Four").
- The attendance record for the building is 12,961, set during the semifinals of the 1957 high school state basketball tournament.
  Hec Ed hosted the state tournament for over fifty years.
- Arguably the biggest game in the building since its renovation occurred on March 6, 2004, when the UW men's basketball team upset top-ranked and undefeated Stanford on national television (ABC), 75–62, with 10,086 in attendance.
- On May 21, 1974, the pioneering jam band Grateful Dead performed to a sold-out audience in the arena, playing the longest single song of their career (besides the Rotterdamn 5/11/72 "Dark Star"), a 46-plus minute version of "Playing in the Band."
- On January 19, 2019, the men's basketball team became the first in NCAA history to record 1,000 wins in the same building.

== See also ==
- List of NCAA Division I basketball arenas

Preceded by Madison Square Garden; Williams Arena	NCAA Basketball Tournament; Finals Venue; 1949; 1952	Succeeded by Madison Square Garden; Municipal Auditorium
