= Travis Garrison =

American basketball player

Personal information
- Born: April 20, 1984 (age 42) Washington, D.C.
- Listed height: 6 ft 8 in (2.03 m)
- Listed weight: 240 lb (109 kg)

Career information
- High school: DeMatha Catholic (Hyattsville, Maryland)
- College: Maryland (2002–2006)
- NBA draft: 2006: undrafted
- Playing career: 2006–2017
- Position: Forward

Career history
- 2006–2007: Great Falls Explorers
- 2007–2008: Seoul SK Knights
- 2008: Alerta Cantabria
- 2008: Gaiteros del Zulia
- 2008: Quilmes
- 2008–2009: Pamukkale Üniversitesi
- 2009–2011: Khimik Yuzhny
- 2011–2012: Kavala
- 2012: Maliye Milli Piyango
- 2012: Atlético Cordón
- 2012–2013: Ilysiakos
- 2013: Gaiteros del Zulia
- 2014–2015: Palanga
- 2015–2016: Al-Bahrain
- 2016: Ostioneros de Guaymas
- 2017: Sol de América

Career highlights
- CBA Rookie of the Year (2007); CBA All-Rookie Team (2007); McDonald's All-American (2002); Third-team Parade All-American (2002); USA Today All-USA Third Team (2002)

Travis Sentel Garrison (born April 20, 1984) is an American former professional basketball player.

== High school career ==
Garrison was born in Washington, D.C. to Lawrence and Sheila Garrison and grew up in Suitland, Maryland with his two older brothers. He enrolled at DeMatha Catholic High School where he was coached by Morgan Wootten: he was already part of the varsity team as a sophomore. As a junior he averaged 15 points, 9 rebounds and 3 blocks per game and for his senior year he was considered one of the top forwards of the class of 2002. In his last year at DeMatha he averaged 17.7 points, 13 rebounds and 4 blocks per game, and received MVP awards of several tournaments in which he played during the season; he was selected in the USA Today Third Team, in the Parade All-American Third Team, he was the 2002 Maryland Gatorade Player of the Year, and was named a McDonald's All-American. In the 2002 McDonald's All-American Boys Game he played for the East team and he scored 2 points, shooting 1/6 from the field and 0/2 from the free throw line.

== College career ==
Garrison decided to remain in his home state and committed to the University of Maryland, where he opted to major in criminology and criminal justice. Coach Gary Williams gave him limited playing time in his freshman year, and Garrison started only 6 of his 30 games of the season. In 12.1 minutes per game he averaged 4.0 points and 3.1 rebounds, recording a season high of 11 points against Duquesne: this was one of two games in which he scored at least 10 points. Williams promoted Garrison to a starter in his sophomore season, and with increased playing time he averaged 7.8 points and 5.2 rebounds, being the second top rebounder of the team behind Jamar Smith. He recorded a season high of 19 points against Duke during the 2004 ACC men's basketball tournament that his team won: his contributions during the tournament earned him a selection in the All-ACC Second Team.

Garrison's junior year at Maryland saw him starting a career-high 30 games, and he improved his overall shooting; he shot 37.5% from 3-point range on 1 attempt per game, and 81.9% from the free throw line. His scoring average increased to 10.1 points per game and he was the top rebounder and the fourth best scorer of the Terrapins behind Nik Caner-Medley, Chris McCray and John Gilchrist. His senior season saw his numbers decrease to 8.0 points per game (despite a career high of 23 points against Western Carolina) and he only started 10 of his 31 games: he was charged with second-degree assault and fourth-degree sex offense in January 2006 for an incident that dated back to October 2005 in College Park, Maryland where he allegedly grabbed a woman and slapped her when she rebuffed his advances. Garrison was originally sentenced to 10 days in prison and he had to register as a sex offender, but his sentence was then modified in 2007, when the judge decided that he only had to stay two years on probation, attend anger management courses and do community service.

During his time with the Maryland Terrapins he averaged 7.5 points, 5.0 rebounds and 1.1 blocks, and he was considered a proficient shooter for his position, with good strength and an effective post game.

=== College statistics ===
| Year | Team | GP | GS | MPG | FG% | 3P% | FT% | RPG | APG | SPG | BPG | PPG |
|---|---|---|---|---|---|---|---|---|---|---|---|---|
| 2002–03 | Maryland | 30 | 6 | 12.1 | .469 | .333 | .684 | 3.1 | 0.5 | 0.4 | 0.8 | 4.0 |
| 2003–04 | Maryland | 32 | 25 | 21.8 | .414 | .357 | .729 | 5.2 | 0.7 | 0.5 | 1.1 | 7.8 |
| 2004–05 | Maryland | 32 | 30 | 24.3 | .444 | .375 | .819 | 6.5 | 0.8 | 0.4 | 1.3 | 10.1 |
| 2005–06 | Maryland | 31 | 10 | 18.0 | .429 | .267 | .700 | 5.3 | 0.5 | 0.5 | 1.0 | 8.0 |
| Career | | 125 | 71 | 19.1 | .435 | .347 | .745 | 5.0 | 0.6 | 0.5 | 1.1 | 7.5 |

== Professional career ==
After his senior year of college Garrison was automatically eligible for the 2006 NBA draft but he was not selected by an NBA franchise. The Los Angeles D-Fenders drafted Garrison in the 2006 NBA Development League draft with the 42nd overall pick. Garrison was also drafted in the 2006 Continental Basketball Association draft with the 25th overall pick by the Atlanta Krunk Wolverines: since the Wolverines ultimately did not take part in the CBA season, Garrison signed for the Great Falls Explorers as a free agent. He played 41 games, started 10, and in 24.4 minutes per game he averaged 11.9 points, 6.1 rebounds, 0.6 assists and 0.9 blocks on 51.7% shooting (80.5% from the free throw line), winning the CBA Rookie of the Year award.

His successful stint in the CBA earned him an opportunity to play in the Korean Basketball League with the Seoul SK Knights; he then played in Spain, Venezuela and Argentina to end the season. In 2008 he transferred to Turkey, and he signed for Pamukkale Üniversitesi where he played in the Turkish second division. At Pamukkale he played the final part of the 2008–2009 season, during which he averaged 20.4 points and 9.4 rebounds, and the first part of the 2009–2010 season where he recorded 21.1 points and 10.2 rebounds. He then signed for Ukrainian team Khimik where he played 2 seasons from 2009 to 2011, averaging 9.5 points in his first year and 8.3 in his second year. He moved again to Turkey in 2011, this time joining Mailye Milli Piyango.

In 2011 he signed for Greek team Kavala where in 11 games he averaged 5.3 points and 2.5 rebounds; he had better stats at Ilisiakos where he played 9 games of the 2012–2013 season, averaging 5.8 points and 5.8 rebounds. He was drafted in the 2013 NBA Development League draft with the 5th pick of the 5th round by the Texas Legends but he did not play in the D-League: he then moved to Lithuania where he played for the second-level team Palanga.

In 2015 he moved to Bahrein and then to Mexican club Ostioneros de Guaymas of the CIBACOPA, averaging 5.0 points and 2.8 rebounds. In May 2017 he signed for Paraguayan team Sol de América.
