= B. J. Elder =

American former professional basketball player

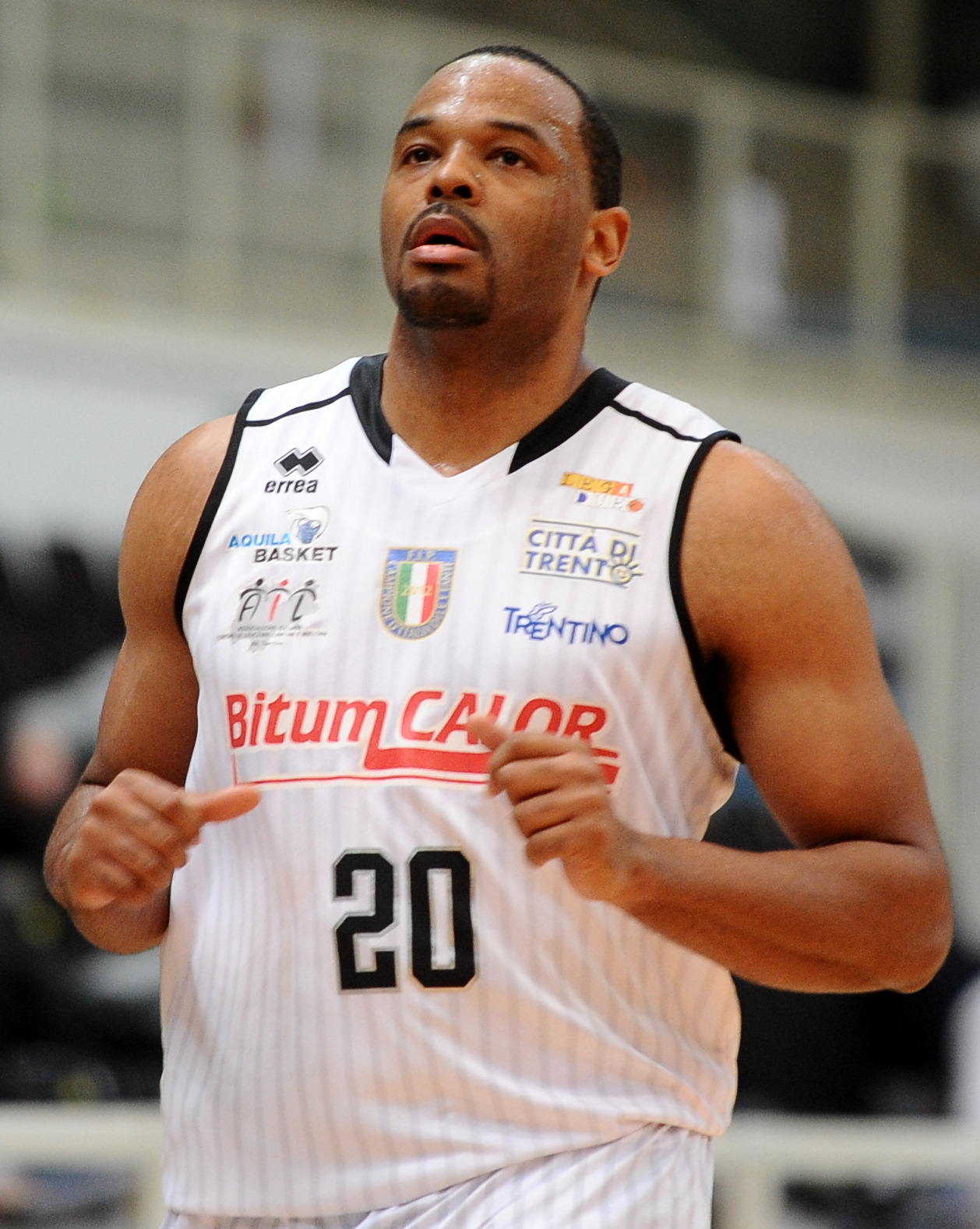
- Elder with Aquila Basket Trento in 2012

Personal information
- Born: September 4, 1982 (age 44) Madison, Georgia, U.S.
- Listed height: 6 ft 4 in (1.93 m)
- Listed weight: 218 lb (99 kg)

Career information
- High school: Morgan County (Madison, Georgia)
- College: Georgia Tech (2001–2005)
- NBA draft: 2005: undrafted
- Playing career: 2005–2014
- Position: Shooting guard / small forward
- Number: 20
- Coaching career: 2023–present

Career history

Playing
- 2005–2006: Gießen 46ers
- 2006–2007: Austin Toros
- 2007–2008: Pallacanestro Biella
- 2008–2009: Pallacanestro Cantù
- 2009–2010: Panionios
- 2010–2011: Aurora Jesi
- 2011–2012: Veroli Basket
- 2012–2014: Aquila Basket Trento

Coaching
- 2023–2026: Georgia Tech (assistant)

Career highlights
- Coppa Italia di Legadue winner (2013); D-League All-Star (2007); All-NBA D-League Second Team (2007); AP Honorable Mention All-American (2004); Second-team All-ACC (2004); Third-team All-ACC (2003)

Barry Jaquawn "B. J." Elder (born September 4, 1982) is an American former professional basketball player. After playing at Morgan County High School in his native Madison, Georgia, Elder played four years of college basketball with the Georgia Tech Yellow Jackets, and reached the Final Four in the 2004 NCAA tournament, losing to the UConn Huskies in the championship game. After his senior year at Georgia Tech, Elder went undrafted in the 2005 NBA draft, and appeared in the 2005 NBA Summer League with the San Antonio Spurs before joining German team Gießen 46ers in the Basketball Bundesliga, starting his professional career. He was a D-League All-Star in 2007 with the Austin Toros and has played in Germany, Greece, and Italy.

== High school career ==
Elder was born in Madison, Georgia, on September 4, 1982, to Barry and LaVonda Elder: his parents later divorced. Elder attended Morgan County High School in Madison, where he soon became a highly touted prospect in the state of Georgia. In his junior year, Elder averaged 21 points and 5 rebounds per game, earning a selection in the All-State Second Team, and was named the Region 7-AA Player of the Year award. In the summer before his senior year he was invited to participate in the ABCD Camp, a camp for the best high school players in the US. In his senior season Elder improved his averages to 26 points, 6 rebounds and 2 steals per game; during the state playoffs that year, Elder shattered a backboard with a dunk. At the end of the season he earned first-team All-State honors, and was ranked among the top 100 players in the country: PrepStars had him as the 20th best shooting guard in the nation and 73rd overall; Hoop Scoop ranked him the 100th best player; The Sporting News included him in their top 100, and he was the 97th best player according to the RSCI (Recruiting Services Consensus Index). His 1,803 career points are an all-time record at Morgan County High School.

== College career ==
Elder signed to play for the Georgia Tech Yellow Jackets in early November 2000, on the first available signing day, together with Ed Nelson of Fort Lauderdale, Florida. Elder had suffered an injury during his senior year of high school, but recovered in time for the beginning of his freshman season at Georgia Tech, and made his debut on November 16, 2001, against Florida A&M, scoring 16 points in 22 minutes. On January 10, 2002, he started his first game, playing 20 minutes against Duke, scoring 10 points. He recorded his season high on February 6, scoring 19 points against Clemson. At the end of the season he was the third best scorer on the team with an average of 9.9 points (behind Tony Akins and Marvin Lewis), and ranked fourth in assists and steals per game. He was named in the ACC All-Freshman team, and was third in the voting for the ACC Rookie of the Year award, behind teammate Ed Nelson and Julius Hodge of NC State.

Elder became a full-time starter in his sophomore year, not starting only in the first two games he played. He missed the first game of the year against Arkansas–Pine Bluff due to a sore foot; in his very first game, against Georgia on November 27, 2002, Elder played 29 minutes and posted a new career high of 24 points. He tied this high on January 11, 2003, against NC State, shooting a season-high 72.7% from the field (8/11, including 3/4 three-pointers). His second year saw him score in double figures on 25 occasions, 8 of which were 20+ games. He ranked second on the team in scoring behind freshman Chris Bosh, and was second in assists behind another freshman, Jarrett Jack. His performance during the season earned him Third-team All-ACC honors.

Elder was considered one of the key elements of the team in his junior year. Having lost Bosh and Nelson, coach Paul Hewitt relied more on Elder, Jack, and juniors Isma'il Muhammad and Luke Schenscher. Elder opened the season scoring 17 points against Louisiana-Lafayette; on January 3, 2004, he posted a new career-high of 25 points against Georgia. He further improved his career high on January 27, when he scored 36 against Clemson. Elder was the 7th best scorer in the ACC with an average of 14.9 points during conference play and was a second-team All-ACC selection. At the 2004 ACC men's basketball tournament Georgia Tech reached the semifinals, losing 85–71 to Duke; Elder scored 25 points and earned a selection to the All-Tournament Second Team. The Yellow Jackets qualified for the 2004 NCAA tournament, and Elder scored 12 points in the win against Northern Iowa, and then 18 against Boston College. At the third minute of the game against Nevada Elder suffered a sprained ankle and exited the game; he was then forced to play limited minutes against Kansas and Oklahoma State. He was selected as a starter for the national championship game against the UConn Huskies, and was second on the team with 14 points, behind Will Bynum's 17. At the end of the NCAA Tournament, Elder was named an Honorable Mention All-American by the Associated Press.

Elder entered his senior year as a preseason John R. Wooden Award and Naismith Award candidate, together with teammates Jack and Schenscher. He made his debut on November 19, 2004, against Alabama State, scoring 15 points. He scored 27 points and 10/12 shooting against Michigan on November 30; on January 1, 2005, he suffered a pulled hamstring in a game against Kansas, and had to miss 9 games, returning on the court on February 8. He scored 19 points during the quarterfinals win against Virginia Tech in the 2005 ACC tournament, and played 34 minutes (9 points) in the final game against Duke, lost by the Yellow Jackets. He also played 2 games during the 2005 NCAA tournament, scoring 15 points against the George Washington Colonials, and 3 in the loss to Louisville. He ended the season as the second-best scorer on the Yellow Jackets behind Jarrett Jack, and was the third-best three-point shooter behind Jack and Anthony Morrow. His 1,616 career points ranked him 13th in the Yellow Jackets all-time scorers list.

=== College statistics ===
Year	Team	GP	GS	MPG	FG%	3P%	FT%	RPG	APG	SPG	BPG	PPG
2001–02	Georgia Tech	31	13	20.3	.428	.360	.787	2.1	1.4	0.9	0.1	9.9
2002–03	Georgia Tech	30	28	29.5	.461	.396	.691	2.6	2.4	1.1	0.1	15.0
2003–04	Georgia Tech	38	36	26.5	.415	.374	.780	2.8	1.4	0.7	0.1	14.9
2004–05	Georgia Tech	23	21	26.3	.399	.341	.717	2.3	1.1	0.8	0.1	12.6
Career		122	98	25.7	.427	.370	.751	2.5	1.6	0.9	0.1	13.2

== Professional career ==
After the end of the senior season, Elder was automatically eligible for the 2005 NBA draft, but he was not selected by an NBA franchise, despite some sources mentioned him as a possible second-round pick. In July 2005 Elder played for the San Antonio Spurs in the Rocky Mountain Revue, an NBA Summer League tournament played in Salt Lake City, Utah: in 5 games he averaged 3.2 points, 0.6 rebounds and 0.4 assists in 14 minutes per game. The Spurs ultimately did not sign him, and Elder joined German team Gießen 46ers, where he made his professional debut. He played 26 games during the 2005–06 Bundesliga, starting 24, and averaged 12.9 points, 2.3 rebounds and 1.6 assists in 26.6 minutes per game, with a career high of 29 points against EnBW Ludwigsburg posted on December 10, 2005.

In 2006 Elder returned to the United States and signed for the Austin Toros, and played the 2006–07 D-League season. He was selected as a D-League All-Star, playing for the Eastern Division team. Elder finished the season with averages of 19.9 points, 3.7 rebounds and 1.9 assists per game over 45 appearances (all starts), and was selected in the All-D-League Second Team.

In 2007 Elder returned to Europe and joined Italian team Pallacanestro Biella, which at the time was playing in the Serie A, the top level of Italian basketball. During the 2007–08 Lega Basket Serie A Elder played 34 games, averaging 30.3 minutes, 15.3 points, 3 rebounds and 2.2 assists, shooting 32.7% from three and 76% from the free throw line. In the summer of 2008 Elder appeared in the NBA Summer League in Orlando, Florida, playing 4 games with the Orlando Magic, averaging 6.5 points per game in 18.4 minutes of playing time. For the following season Elder signed for Pallacanestro Cantù, joining the team on July 30, 2008. In the 2008–09 Serie A season Elder scored 13 points per game, and added 2.6 rebounds and 1.3 assists, shooting 38.3% from three-point range.

In 2009 Elder left Italy for Greece, and signed with Greek Basket League team Panionios. During the 2009–10 season Elder appeared in 23 regular season games, playing 24.9 minutes and posting averages of 7.1 points, 2.7 rebounds and 1.1 assists; his team qualified for the playoffs, and Elder played both games against Panathinaikos, playing limited minutes (8.5 per game).

In 2010 Elder returned to Italy and signed for Aurora Basket Jesi, a team of Serie A2, the second level of Italian basketball. At Jesi, Elder appeared in 30 games, and averaged 14.5 points per game while shooting 43.1% from three-point range. In late December 2011 Elder signed for Veroli Basket, also of Serie A2, replacing Jason Rowe as the second American player on the team. Elder played 13 games with Veroli, averaging 12.8 points, 2.7 rebounds and 3.4 assists per game in the 2011–12 season. In the offseason Elder signed with Aquila Basket Trento, staying in the Serie A2 for the third consecutive season. He averaged 16 points, 3.2 rebounds and 1.4 assists per game while shooting a career-high 44.2% from the three-point line. Trento reached the playoffs, and Elder appeared and started in 7 games, averaging 18.3 points and shooting 47.5% on three-pointers. He also won the Legadue Italian Cup, a competition for Serie A2 teams. Elder retired after the 2013–14 Legadue season, ended with Trento's promotion in Serie A, after averaging 14.3 points, 1.9 rebounds and 1.9 assists over 28 appearances.

Throughout his professional career he primarily played as a small forward, but was also considered for the shooting guard and power forward positions.
