= 2004 NCAA Division I men's basketball championship game =

American college basketball final

2004 NCAA Tournament Championship Game
National championship game
Georgia Tech Yellow Jackets	Connecticut Huskies
ACC	Big East
(28–9)	(32–6)
73	82
Head coach: Paul Hewitt	Head coach: Jim Calhoun
- AP: 14
- Coaches: 15
- AP: 7
- Coaches: 7
	1st half	2nd half	Total
Georgia Tech Yellow Jackets	26	47	73
Connecticut Huskies	41	41	82
- Date: April 5, 2004
- Venue: Alamodome, San Antonio, Texas
- MVP: Emeka Okafor, Connecticut
- Favorite: Connecticut by 6.5
- Referees: Dick Cartmell, Randy McCall, Verne Harris
- Attendance: 44,468

United States TV coverage
- Network: CBS
- Announcers: Jim Nantz (play-by-play); Billy Packer (color); Bonnie Bernstein and Armen Keteyian (sideline)
- Nielsen Ratings: 11.0

The 2004 NCAA Division I men's basketball championship game was the finals of the 2004 NCAA Division I men's basketball tournament and it determined the national champion for the 2003-04 NCAA Division I men's basketball season The game was played on April 5, 2004, at the Alamodome in San Antonio, Texas and featured the Phoenix Regional Champion, #2-seeded Connecticut versus the St. Louis Regional Champion, #3-seeded Georgia Tech.

UConn and Georgia Tech met in the semifinals of the 2003 NIT Season Tip-Off and Georgia Tech upset #1-ranked UConn with a 77–61 win on their way to winning the 2003 NIT Season Tip-Off. However, the Huskies would prevail handily in their rematch in the title game to win their second national championship.

== Participants ==
=== Georgia Tech Yellow Jackets ===
Georgia Tech entered the tournament as the #3 seed in the St. Louis regional. In the 1st round, Georgia Tech survived a scare against Northern Iowa when Ben Jacobson missed a game-tying 3-pointer as Georgia Tech was able to pull away with a 65–60 win. In the 2nd round, Jarrett Jack made a breakaway dunk with less than six seconds left to hold off Boston College 57–54. In the Sweet 16, Marvin Lewis scored 23 points to lead Georgia Tech to a 72–67 victory over Nevada to advance to the Elite Eight. In the Elite Eight, Jarrett Jack scored 29 points to lead Georgia Tech to a 79–71 overtime win over Kansas to advance to the Final Four. In the Final Four, Will Bynum made a last second shot to defeat Oklahoma State 67–65 and earn the Yellow Jackets their first-ever trip to the national championship game.

=== Connecticut Huskies ===
Connecticut entered the tournament as the #2 seed in the Phoenix Regional. In the 1st round, Emeka Okafor had a double double with 15 points and 14 rebounds and he was able to limit the nation's third-leading scorer Taylor Coppenrath to 12 points as Connecticut beat Vermont 70–53. In the 2nd round, Connecticut was able to beat DePaul 72–55 despite their coach Jim Calhoun having an upset stomach. In the Sweet 16, Ben Gordon scored 20 points to lead Connecticut to a 73–53 victory over Vanderbilt. In the Elite Eight, Emeka Okafor only scored two points due to a tweaked shoulder but Ben Gordon's 36 points and Rashad Anderson's 28 points led Connecticut to an 87–71 victory over Alabama for a trip to the Final Four. In the Final Four, Emeka Okafor scored all 18 of his points in the 2nd half as he led Connecticut to a 12–0 run, down 75–67 with less than three minutes remaining, to beat Duke 79–78 and advance to the national championship game for the first time since 1999.

== Starting lineups ==
Georgia Tech	Position	Connecticut
Marvin Lewis	G	Taliek Brown
Jarrett Jack	G	Ben Gordon
B. J. Elder	F	Rashad Anderson
Anthony McHenry	F	Josh Boone
Luke Schenscher	C	† Emeka Okafor
† 2004 Consensus First Team All-American

== Game summary ==
External videos
- Full game broadcast by CBS on YouTube

CBS

April 5, 2004
9:21 pm

Box score

#PH2 Connecticut Huskies 82, #SL3 Georgia Tech Yellow Jackets 73
Pts: Emeka Okafor 24; Rebs: Emeka Okafor 15; Asts: Taliek Brown 4	Pts: Will Bynum 17; Rebs: Luke Schenscher 11; Asts: Will Bynum 5 Halftime Score: UConn, 41-26

Alamodome - San Antonio, Texas
Attendance: 44,468
Referees: Dick Cartmell, Randy McCall, Verne Harris

Emeka Okafor and Ben Gordon got hot in the first half. Ben Gordon hit three three-pointers in the 1st ten minutes while Emeka Okafor dominated Georgia Tech center Luke Schenscher in the lane. Okafor and Gordon nearly outscored Georgia Tech in the first half, scoring 24 points combined while Georgia Tech scored 26 points as UConn was ahead 41–26 at halftime. The Yellow Jackets could not take advantage of Gordon being on the bench after his second foul. The Huskies was able to extend their lead even with Gordon on the bench. UConn was able to build a 25-point lead at one point. When the Huskies backed off and slowed the game down, the Yellow Jackets were able to make a furious rally to cut UConn's lead down to seven. However, UConn was able to hold off the Yellow Jackets with 24 points and 15 rebounds from Okafor and 21 points from Gordon, as they won 82–73.

== Aftermath ==
Thousands of people in Connecticut celebrated after UConn's victory in the men's national championship game. 35 people were arrested by the police for starting fires and overturning cars in celebration of UConn's second men's and fifth women's national championships. The university police reported that dozens of fires were set outside, and two cars were overturned at the Celeron Square apartment complex about a mile month of campus following UConn's victory over Georgia Tech.

UConn became the first school ever in Division I to win NCAA titles in men's and women's basketball in the same season. The Huskies would repeat this feat in 2014.
