= 2003–04 Maryland Terrapins men's basketball team =

American college basketball season

2003–04 Maryland Terrapins men's basketball
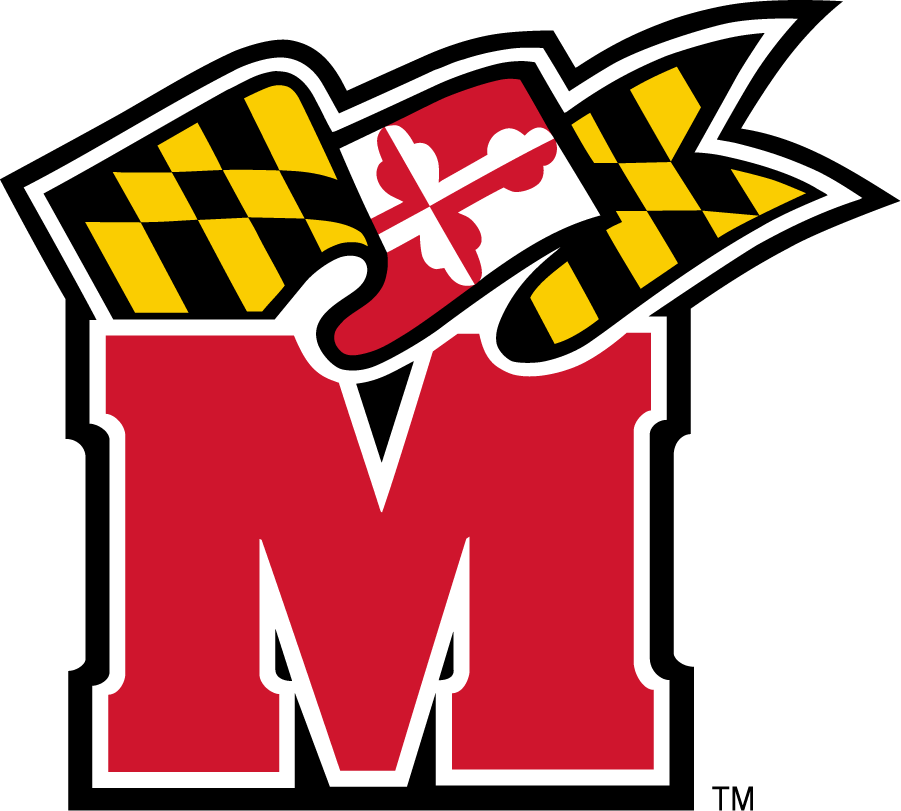

ACC tournament champions

NCAA tournament, Round of 32
- Conference: Atlantic Coast Conference

Ranking
- Coaches: No. 24
- AP: No. 19
- Record: 20–12 (7–9 ACC)
- Head coach: Gary Williams
- Assistant coach: Dave Dickerson; Jimmy Patsos; Matt Kovarik; Troy Wainwright
- Home arena: Comcast Center

2003–04 ACC men's basketball standings
	Conf.				Overall
Team	W		L	PCT	W		L	PCT
No. 6 Duke	13	–	3	.813	31	–	6	.838
No. 15 NC State	11	–	5	.688	21	–	10	.677
No. 17 Wake Forest	9	–	7	.563	21	–	10	.677
No. 14 Georgia Tech	9	–	7	.563	28	–	10	.737
No. 18 North Carolina	8	–	8	.500	19	–	11	.633
No. 19 Maryland†	7	–	9	.438	20	–	12	.625
Florida State	6	–	10	.375	19	–	14	.576
Virginia	6	–	10	.375	18	–	13	.581
Clemson	3	–	13	.188	10	–	18	.357
† 2004 ACC tournament winner Rankings from AP Poll

The 2003–04 Maryland Terrapins men's basketball team represented the University of Maryland in the 2003–2004 college basketball season as a member of the Atlantic Coast Conference (ACC). The team was led by head coach Gary Williams and played their home games at the Comcast Center. They won the 2004 ACC Men's Basketball Tournament—the first Maryland team to do so since 1984—and advanced to the round of 32 in the 2004 NCAA basketball tournament.

== Roster ==
2003–04 Maryland Terrapins men's basketball team
Players
Coaches

Pos.	#	Name	Height	Weight	Year	Hometown
F/C	1	Jamar Smith	6 ft 9 in (2.06 m)	239 lb (108 kg)	Sr	Sicklerville, New Jersey
F	4	Travis Garrison	6 ft 8 in (2.03 m)	236 lb (107 kg)	So	Suitland, Maryland
G	5	D. J. Strawberry	6 ft 5 in (1.96 m)	183 lb (83 kg)	Fr	Corona, California
G	11	John Gilchrist	6 ft 3 in (1.91 m)	199 lb (90 kg)	So	Virginia Beach, Virginia
G	13	Chris McCray	6 ft 5 in (1.96 m)	180 lb (82 kg)	So	Capitol Heights, Maryland
F	20	Darien Henry	6 ft 6 in (1.98 m)	204 lb (93 kg)	Jr	Roxbury, New Jersey
F	21	Mike Grinnon	6 ft 6 in (1.98 m)	211 lb (96 kg)	Jr	Huntington, New York
F	22	Nik Caner-Medley	6 ft 8 in (2.03 m)	233 lb (106 kg)	So	Portland, Maine
G	23	Mike Jones	6 ft 5 in (1.96 m)	196 lb (89 kg)	Fr	Dorchester, Massachusetts
F	25	Ekene Ibekwe	6 ft 9 in (2.06 m)	211 lb (96 kg)	Fr	Carson, California
C	31	Will Bowers	7 ft 1 in (2.16 m)	245 lb (111 kg)	Fr	Hanover, Maryland
F/C	44	Hassan Fofana	6 ft 10 in (2.08 m)	290 lb (132 kg)	Fr	Weston, Massachusetts

Head coach

- Gary Williams

Assistant coach(es)

- Dave Dickerson
- Jimmy Patsos
- Matt Kovarik
- Troy Wainwright

Legend

- (C) Team captain
- (S) Suspended
- (I) Ineligible
- (W) Walk-on
- Injured
- Current redshirt

== Schedule ==
Date time, TV	Rank^{#}	Opponent^{#}	Result	Record	Site city, state
Regular Season
November 22	No. 25	American	W 79–48	1–0	Comcast Center; College Park, Maryland
November 25	No. 24	George Mason	W 79–64	2–0	Comcast Center; College Park, Maryland
November 29	No. 24	Hofstra	W 87–72	3–0	Comcast Center; College Park, Maryland
December 2	No. 25	No. 15 Wisconsin; ACC/Big Ten Challenge	W 73–67 ^{OT}	4–0	Comcast Center; College Park, Maryland
December 6	No. 25	vs. No. 17 Gonzaga; BB&T Classic	L 68–82	4–1	MCI Center; Washington, DC
December 7	No. 25	vs. West Virginia; BB&T Classic	L 77–78 ^{OT}	4–2	MCI Center; Washington, DC
December 10		at No. 1 Florida	W 69–68 ^{OT}	5–2	O'Connell Center; Gainesville, Florida
December 14		Pepperdine	W 96–72	6–2	Comcast Center; College Park, Maryland
December 23	No. 24	UNC Greensboro	W 85–58	7–2	Comcast Center; College Park, Maryland
December 28	No. 24	at Florida State	L 75–79	7–3 (0–1)	Donald L. Tucker Civic Center; Tallahassee, Florida
January 3		Mount St. Mary's	W 89–56	8–3	Comcast Center; College Park, Maryland
January 6		Maryland Eastern Shore	W 87–38	9–3	Comcast Center; College Park, Maryland
January 14		No. 9 North Carolina	W 90–84	10–3 (1–1)	Comcast Center; College Park, Maryland
January 17		at No. 12 Georgia Tech	L 71–81	10–4 (1–2)	Alexander Memorial Coliseum; Atlanta, Georgia
January 21		No. 1 Duke	L 60–68	10–5 (1–3)	Comcast Center; College Park, Maryland
January 25		at Clemson	W 65–52	11–5 (2–3)	Littlejohn Coliseum; Clemson, South Carolina
January 29		at No. 19 Wake Forest	L 85–93	11–6 (2–4)	Lawrence Joel Veterans Memorial Coliseum; Winston-Salem, North Carolina
February 1		NC State	L 69–81	11–7 (2–5)	Comcast Center; College Park, Maryland
February 4		at Virginia	W 71–67	12–7 (3–5)	University Hall; Charlottesville, Virginia
February 8		Florida State	W 73–62	13–7 (4–5)	Comcast Center; College Park, Maryland
February 15		at No. 14 North Carolina	L 86–97	13–8 (4–6)	Dean E. Smith Center; Chapel Hill, North Carolina
February 19		No. 18 Georgia Tech	L 64–75	13–9 (4–7)	Comcast Center; College Park, Maryland
February 22; CBS		at No. 3 Duke	L 63–86	13–10 (4–8)	Cameron Indoor Stadium; Durham, North Carolina
February 24		Clemson	W 70–49	14–10 (5–8)	Comcast Center; College Park, Maryland
February 28		No. 11 Wake Forest	L 83–91	14–11 (5–9)	Comcast Center; College Park, Maryland
March 3		at No. 16 NC State	W 70–69	15–11 (6–9)	RBC Center; Raleigh, North Carolina
March 7		Virginia	W 70–61	16–11 (7–9)	Comcast Center; College Park, Maryland
ACC Tournament
March 12		vs. No. 15 Wake Forest	W 87–86	17–11	Greensboro Coliseum; Greensboro, North Carolina
March 13		vs. No. 17 NC State	W 85–82	18–11	Greensboro Coliseum; Greensboro, North Carolina
March 14		vs. No. 5 Duke	W 95–87 ^{OT}	19–11	Greensboro Coliseum; Greensboro, North Carolina
NCAA Tournament
March 18	No. 19	vs. UTEP; First Round	W 86–83	20–11	Pepsi Center; Denver, Colorado
March 20	No. 19	vs. Syracuse; Second Round	L 70–72	20–12	Pepsi Center; Denver, Colorado
*Non-conference game. ^{#}Rankings from AP Poll. (#) Tournament seedings in parentheses.
