= DeAngelo Collins =

American basketball player (born 1982)

Personal information
- Born: November 21, 1982 (age 43) Stockton, California, U.S.
- Listed height: 6 ft 9 in (2.06 m)
- Listed weight: 230 lb (104 kg)

Career information
- High school: Tustin (Tustin, California); Inglewood (Inglewood, California)
- NBA draft: 2002: undrafted
- Playing career: 2002–2012
- Position: Power forward / center

Career history
- 2002: Darüşşafaka
- 2004: Central Entrerriano
- 2004: Juarez Gallos
- 2004: Red Bull Barako
- 2004–2005: Florida Flame
- 2005: Yunnan Honghe Bulls
- 2005: Grises de Humacao
- 2005–2006: BT Roseto
- 2006: Beijing Aoshen Olympians
- 2006: Dodge City Legend
- 2007: Orthodox
- 2007: Cocodrilos de Caracas
- 2007: Zhejiang Lions
- 2007–2008: Al-Ittihad Jeddah
- 2008: Carlsbad Beach Dawgs
- 2008–2009: Seoul SK Knights
- 2010: Jilin Northeast Tigers
- 2010: Leones de Ponce
- 2010: Trotamundos de Carabobo
- 2011: Shenyang Dongjin
- 2012: Sichuan Blue Whales

Career highlights
- McDonald's All-American (2002); Third-team Parade All-American (2002); USA Today High School Basketball Third Team (2002)

DeAngelo Marquis Collins (born November 21, 1982) (Note: His birthdate has been also reported as being November 21, 1981, and November 21, 1982, depending on the source. NBA.com lists him as born in 1980. The California Birth Index shows his date of birth as November 21, 1982. "Deangelo Marquis Collins was born on November 21, 1982 in San Joaquin County, California". californiabirthindex.org. California Birth Index.) is an American former professional basketball player.

== High school career ==
The son of single mother Loretta Marie Taylor, he grew up in Stockton, California, in a low-income neighborhood and since the beginning of his high school career Collins was a promising basketball player whose career was often slowed down by discipline issues. During his first year at Tustin High he was involved in a fight with a teammate, during which Collins caused serious injuries to the other student and was sentenced to 6 months in juvenile hall. After several more issues with the law (including another sentence for 2 months to be served in juvenile detention), Collins and his mother moved to Inglewood, California, in an attempt to change the violent attitude of the teenager. This decision proved beneficial to the young Collins, who reportedly started to improve his behavior, helped by the guidance of Inglewood high school coach Patrick Roy. While he averaged 12 points and 12 rebounds in his 29 games of his freshman season at Tustin, he improved his numbers and recorded averages of 20 points and 15 rebounds in his sophomore year. Collins became nationally known during his last year of high school, during which he reached the first positions of most rankings: throughout his senior year he was consistently ranked among the top 10 players of his class, going as high as 7th in the nation.

During the 2001 ABCD Camp he was ranked among the top 10 players and was named MVP of the Seniors All-Star Game with 23 points and 10 rebounds. He also played during the Youth Development Festival organized by USA Basketball. According to various experts who watched him play during his high school days, his skillset was unusual: while his 6-9 frame (several sources listed him at 6–10) generally made him play as a center during his high school games, he was capable of playing the power forward position thanks to his shooting skills and his quickness: he was frequently described as having the body of a big man and the skills of a guard. This also represented one of his weaknesses: while he had good skills in several parts of the game, he did not truly excel in any of them. After averaging 24.5 points and 17.4 rebounds, Collins was selected as a Third-team Parade All-American and as a McDonald's All-American. During the 2002 McDonald's All-American Boys Game he scored 15 points and recorded 6 rebounds.

On May 1, 2002, Collins announced that he was going to skip college and enter the 2002 NBA draft as an early entrant.

== Professional career ==
During the 2002 draft, no NBA team selected Collins, who was then allowed to sign for any team as an unrestricted free agent. Despite having participated in the Toronto Raptors preseason camp, he did not receive any offers from the Raptors or any NBA team, and he decided to start his professional career in Europe. His first professional club was Istanbul-based Darüşşafaka S.K., and he played 1 game in the 2002–03 ULEB Cup: in 14 minutes of play he scored both of his field goals, scoring 4 points and recording 3 rebounds. Collins briefly played for several teams and struggled to find stability: in January 2004 he signed for Central Entrerriano, in the Argentine Liga Nacional de Básquet, as a temporary replacement for Anthony Bishop, and played only 4 games there, averaging 20.5 points, 12.8 rebounds and 2.5 blocks. After the short stint in Argentina he transferred to Mexico, where he played for the Juarez Gallos. In 2004 he was called by the Philadelphia 76ers to be part of their Summer League squad, but he had to move to another country once more to find playing time: he signed for Red Bull Barako of the Philippine league. He came back to the United States to play for the Florida Flame, where he appeared in 12 games, averaging only 2.3 points and 4.3 rebounds. At the beginning of 2005 he signed for Yunnan Honghe in the Chinese CBL, where he played 16 games with drastically improved averages of 28.9 points and 16.6 rebounds.

After a brief experience at Grises de Humacao in Puerto Rico, Collins came back to Europe and in July 2005 he signed for Italian club Roseto, but during his three months there he only played 4 games, averaging 3.8 points and 6.3 rebounds in 15 minutes of play. The Italian team released him on October 22, 2005, following to several disciplinary issues, among which an argument with teammate Jack Michael Martínez that almost escalated in a fight. After Italy, Collins decided to play for the Dodge City Legend in the USBL, appearing in 13 games. Another NBA team gave Collins a chance during the 2007 Summer Pro League: the Dallas Mavericks. He was not included in the final roster and had again to go abroad, this time in Jordan when he averaged 10 points per game with Orthodox, and in March 2007 he moved to Venezuela where he played 5 games with Cocodrilos de Caracas, averaging 8.4 points, 9.2 rebounds, 0.6 assists and 1 block per game in 26.4 minutes of playing time. After two short stints in Saudi Arabia and in the American WCBL, Collins found a relatively stable role as a starter in South Korea, where he joined the Seoul SK Knights for 33 games, averaging 11.6 points and 10.3 rebounds. In January 2010 he came back to China, signing for the Jilin Northeast Tigers, where he appeared in 14 games. He played again in Puerto Rico and Venezuela and in 2011 he signed for Shenyang Dongjin, posting averages of 23.1 points and 12.5 rebounds in 19 games.
