= 2003–04 Virginia Cavaliers men's basketball team =

American college basketball season

2003–04 Virginia Cavaliers men's basketball

NIT, Second Round
- Conference: Atlantic Coast Conference
- Record: 18–13 (6–10 ACC)
- Head coach: Pete Gillen
- Assistant coaches: Walt Fuller; Scott Shepherd; Rod Jensen
- Home arena: University Hall

2003–04 ACC men's basketball standings
	Conf.				Overall
Team	W		L	PCT	W		L	PCT
No. 6 Duke	13	–	3	.813	31	–	6	.838
No. 15 NC State	11	–	5	.688	21	–	10	.677
No. 17 Wake Forest	9	–	7	.563	21	–	10	.677
No. 14 Georgia Tech	9	–	7	.563	28	–	10	.737
No. 18 North Carolina	8	–	8	.500	19	–	11	.633
No. 19 Maryland†	7	–	9	.438	20	–	12	.625
Florida State	6	–	10	.375	19	–	14	.576
Virginia	6	–	10	.375	18	–	13	.581
Clemson	3	–	13	.188	10	–	18	.357
† 2004 ACC tournament winner Rankings from AP Poll

The 2003–04 Virginia Cavaliers men's basketball team represented the University of Virginia during the 2003–04 NCAA Division I men's basketball season. The team was led by sixth-year head coach Pete Gillen, and played their home games at University Hall in Charlottesville, Virginia as members of the Atlantic Coast Conference.

== Last season ==
The Cavaliers had a record of 16–16, with a conference record of 6–10. They appeared in the 2003 National Invitation Tournament, where they lost in the second round to eventual champion St. John's.

== Roster ==
2003–04 Virginia Cavaliers men's basketball team
Players
Coaches

Pos.	#	Name	Height	Weight	Year	Hometown
G	2	J. R. Reynolds	6 ft 2.5 in (1.89 m)	196 lb (89 kg)	Fr	Oak Hill Academy	Roanoke, Virginia
F	4	Vince Redd	6 ft 6 in (1.98 m)	243 lb (110 kg)	Fr	Elizabethton	Elizabethton, Tennessee
G/F	5	Derrick Byars	6 ft 7 in (2.01 m)	215 lb (98 kg)	So	Ridgeway	Memphis, Tennessee
G	10	Billy Glading	6 ft 2 in (1.88 m)	172 lb (78 kg)	Sr	Gonzaga	Bethesda, Maryland
G	11	Majestic Mapp (C)	6 ft 2 in (1.88 m)	184 lb (83 kg)	RS Sr	St. Raymond's	Harlem, New York
G	12	Billy Campbell	6 ft 0 in (1.83 m)	183 lb (83 kg)	So	Paideia School	Atlanta
G	15	T. J. Bannister	5 ft 10.5 in (1.79 m)	168 lb (76 kg)	Fr	Arlington Country Day	Jacksonville, Florida
G	21	Robert Lodge	6 ft 4 in (1.93 m)	211 lb (96 kg)	So	Montrose Christian	Dugbe Ibadan, Nigeria
G	22	Todd Billet (C)	6 ft 0 in (1.83 m)	183 lb (83 kg)	RS Sr	Christian Brothers	Middletown, New Jersey
G/F	23	Gary Forbes	6 ft 6 in (1.98 m)	210 lb (95 kg)	Fr	Benjamin Banneker	Brooklyn, New York
F	30	Hank Nacey	6 ft 5 in (1.96 m)	210 lb (95 kg)	So	Frank W. Cox	Virginia Beach, Virginia
F	32	Jason Cain	6 ft 9 in (2.06 m)	205 lb (93 kg)	Fr	John Bartram	Philadelphia
F	33	Devin Smith (C)	6 ft 5 in (1.96 m)	239 lb (108 kg)	Jr	William Penn	New Castle, Delaware
F	34	Jason Clark	6 ft 8 in (2.03 m)	234 lb (106 kg)	Jr	Hargrave Military	Virginia Beach, Virginia
F/C	43	Elton Brown	6 ft 9 in (2.06 m)	251 lb (114 kg)	Jr	Warwick	Newport News, Virginia
F	52	Brad Abel	6 ft 5.5 in (1.97 m)	210 lb (95 kg)	Sr	Fork Union Military	Burke, Virginia
F/C	55	Donte Minter	6 ft 7.5 in (2.02 m)	244 lb (111 kg)	Fr	Fork Union Military	Salisbury, North Carolina

Head coach

- Pete Gillen (Fairfield)

Assistant coach(es)

- Walt Fuller (Drexel)
- Scott Shepherd (Robert Morris)
- Rod Jensen (Redlands)

Legend

- (C) Team captain
- (S) Suspended
- (I) Ineligible
- (W) Walk-on
- Injured
- Current redshirt

Roster
Last update: 22 Dec. 2014

== Schedule ==
Date time, TV	Opponent	Result	Record	Site (attendance) city, state
Exhibition
Nov. 11; 7:30 pm	Big Apple All-Stars	W 104–80		University Hall; Charlottesville, Virginia
Nov. 17; 7:30 pm	Coaches vs. Cancer Team Dasani	W 91–90		University Hall; Charlottesville, Virginia
Regular season
Nov. 23*; 7:00 pm	Mount St. Mary's	W 80–71	1–0	University Hall (6,437); Charlottesville, Virginia
Nov. 28*; 8:00 pm, Fox Sports South/CSN	Virginia Tech	W 80–65	2–0	University Hall (7,771); Charlottesville, Virginia
Nov. 30*; 2:00 pm	High Point	W 79–64	3–0	University Hall (6,329); Charlottesville, Virginia
Dec. 3*; 9:30 pm, ESPN2	Minnesota; ACC–Big Ten Challenge	W 86–78	4–0	University Hall (7,084); Charlottesville, Virginia
Dec. 5*; 7:00 pm	at VMI	W 78–56	5–0	Cameron Hall (3,724); Lexington, Virginia
Dec. 16*; 7:30 pm	James Madison	W 90–80	6–0	University Hall (7,645); Charlottesville, Virginia
Dec. 19*; 7:05 pm	at Loyola Marymount	W 76–68	7–0	Gersten Pavilion (1,662); Los Angeles
Dec. 22*; 7:30 pm	Coastal Carolina	W 89–74	8–0	University Hall (7,185); Charlottesville, Virginia
Dec. 28; 8:00 pm, FSN	at NC State	L 69–86	8–1 (0–1)	RBC Center (16,627); Raleigh, North Carolina
Dec. 31*; 6:00 pm	Iowa State	W 85–74	9–1 (0–1)	University Hall (7,354); Charlottesville, Virginia
Jan. 3*; 3:00 pm	Providence	L 69–84 ^{CSN}	9–2 (0–1)	University Hall (7,470); Charlottesville, Virginia
Jan. 5*; 9:00 pm, CSN	William & Mary	W 84–71	10–2 (0–1)	University Hall (6,354); Charlottesville, Virginia
Jan. 11; 5:30 pm, CSN	No. 2 Duke	L 71–93	10–3 (0–2)	University Hall (8,392); Charlottesville, Virginia
Jan. 15; 7:00 pm, ESPN2	at No. 12 Georgia Tech	L 57–75	10–4 (0–3)	Alexander Memorial Coliseum (9,191); Atlanta
Jan. 18; 1:00 pm, Raycom	Florida State	W 76–67 ^{OT}	11–4 (1–3)	University Hall (7,345); Charlottesville, Virginia
Jan. 20; 7:00 pm, RSN	Clemson	W 61–50	12–4 (2–3)	University Hall (7,129); Charlottesville, Virginia
Jan. 24; Noon, ESPN	at No. 7 North Carolina	L 77–96	12–5 (2–4)	Dean Smith Center (20,874); Chapel Hill, North Carolina
Jan. 31; 2:30 pm, Raycom	at No. 19 Wake Forest	L 78–91	12–6 (2–5)	LJVM Coliseum (14,163); Winston-Salem, North Carolina
Feb. 4; 9:00 pm, Raycom	Maryland	L 67–71	12–7 (2–6)	University Hall (7,378); Charlottesville, Virginia
Feb. 7; 3:00 pm, Raycom	NC State	L 63–79	12–8 (2–7)	University Hall (7,619); Charlottesville, Virginia
Feb. 11; 7:00 pm, ESPN	at No. 1 Duke	L 75–93	12–9 (2–8)	Cameron Indoor Stadium (9,314); Durham, North Carolina
Feb. 14; 2:00 pm, Raycom	No. 15 Georgia Tech	W 82–80	13–9 (3–8)	University Hall (7,544); Charlottesville, Virginia
Feb. 17; 7:00 pm, RSN	at Florida State	L 57–76	13–10 (3–9)	Tallahassee-Leon County Civic Center (9,065); Tallahassee, Florida
Feb. 21; 4:00 pm, Raycom	at Clemson	W 58–55	14–10 (4–9)	Littlejohn Coliseum (8,900); Clemson, South Carolina
Feb. 24; 8:00 pm, Raycom	No. 12 North Carolina	W 74–72	15–10 (5–9)	University Hall (7,429); Charlottesville, Virginia
Mar. 2; 7:00 pm, ESPN2	No. 11 Wake Forest	W 84–82	16–10 (6–9)	University Hall (8,392); Charlottesville, Virginia
Mar. 7; 8:00 pm, FSN	Maryland	L 61–70	16–11 (6–10)	Comcast Center (17,950); College Park, Maryland
ACC Tournament
Mar. 11; 7:00 pm, ESPN	vs. Clemson; ACC Tournament first round	W 83–79 ^{OT}	17–11	Greensboro Coliseum (17,211); Greensboro, North Carolina
Mar. 12; Noon, Raycom/ESPN2	vs. No. 5 Duke; ACC Tournament Quarterfinal	L 74–84	17–12	Greensboro Coliseum (23,745); Greensboro, North Carolina
National Invitation Tournament
Mar. 17*; 7:00 pm	George Washington; NIT First Round	W 79–66	18–12	University Hall (6,512); Charlottesville, Virginia
Mar. 20*	at Villanova; NIT Second Round	L 63–73	18–13	The Pavilion (3,714); Villanova, Pennsylvania
*Non-conference game. (#) Tournament seedings in parentheses. All times are in Eastern Time.
