= 2002 McDonald's All-American Boys Game =

American high school basketball game

East	West
138	107
	1st half	2nd half	Total
East	70	68	138
West	44	63	107
- Date: April 4, 2002
- Venue: Madison Square Garden, New York City, New York
- MVP: JJ Redick
- Referees: 1; 2; 3
- Attendance: 16,505
- Network: ESPN

McDonald's All-American

The 2002 McDonald's All-American Boys Game was an All-star basketball game played on Thursday, April 4, 2002 at the Madison Square Garden in New York City, New York. The game's rosters featured the best and most highly recruited high school boys graduating in 2002. The game was the 25th annual version of the McDonald's All-American Game first played in 1978.

== 2002 game ==
The game was telecast live by ESPN. For the 25th game, McDonald's chose a prestigious venue: the Madison Square Garden. 2002 was also the inaugural year of the McDonald's Girls game. The East team was led by JJ Redick, who earned the MVP award by scoring 26 points, which included 5 3-point shots made. Other players who starred were Carmelo Anthony, who entertained the crowd with several dunks and scored 19 points; Rashad McCants, who scored 22 points; Bracey Wright, who recorded a double double with 16 points and 11 rebounds; and Chris Bosh, who had 14 points and 7 rebounds. Of the 24 players, 13 went on to play at least 1 game in the NBA. Two players declared their eligibility for the 2002 NBA draft: DeAngelo Collins and Amar'e Stoudemire. Stoudemire was selected with the 9th overall pick by the Phoenix Suns, while Collins, who was by far the oldest player in the All-American game at almost 22 years of age, went undrafted and never played in the NBA, opting to play professionally overseas.

=== East roster ===
No.	Name	Height	Weight	Position	Hometown	High school	College of Choice
2	Raymond Felton	6-1	190	G	Latta, SC, U.S.	Latta	North Carolina
4	JJ Redick	6-4	195	G	Roanoke, VA, U.S.	Cave Spring	Duke
12	Elijah Ingram	6-1	165	G	Jersey City, NJ, U.S.	St. Anthony	St. John's
20	Jason Fraser	6-10	215	F	Amityville, NY, U.S.	Amityville Memorial	Villanova
21	Torin Francis	6-10	225	C	Marion, MA, U.S.	Tabor Academy	Notre Dame
22	Carmelo Anthony	6-7	210	F	Mouth of Wilson, VA, U.S.	Oak Hill Academy	Syracuse
25	Travis Garrison	6-8	235	F	Hyattsville, MD, U.S.	DeMatha Catholic	Maryland
31	Eric Williams	6-9	285	C	Rolesville, NC, U.S.	Rolesville	Wake Forest
32	Amare Stoudemire	6-10	245	C	Orlando, FL, U.S.	Cypress Creek	Undecided (Did not attend)
33	Rashad McCants	6-3	195	G	New Hampton, NH, U.S.	New Hampton	North Carolina
41	Sean May	6-8	250	F	Bloomington, IN, U.S.	Bloomington North	North Carolina
42	Shavlik Randolph	6-10	215	F	Raleigh, NC, U.S.	Needham B. Broughton	Duke

=== West roster ===
No.	Name	Height	Weight	Position	Hometown	High school	College of Choice
1	Chris Bosh	6-10	205	F	Dallas, TX, U.S.	Lincoln	Georgia Tech
4	Bracey Wright	6-3	185	G	The Colony, TX, U.S.	The Colony	Indiana
10	Anthony Roberson	6-3	185	G	Saginaw, MI, U.S.	Saginaw	Florida
11	Dee Brown	6-0	185	G	Maywood, IL, U.S.	Proviso East	Illinois
15	Sean Dockery	6-3	190	G	Chicago, IL, U.S.	Julian	Duke
21	Evan Burns	6-8	220	F	Los Angeles, CA, U.S.	Fairfax	UCLA
22	Bradley Buckman	6-9	230	F	Austin, TX, U.S.	Westlake	Texas
24	DeAngelo Collins	6-10	225	F	Inglewood, CA, U.S.	Inglewood	Undecided (Did not attend)
30	Daniel Horton	6-3	190	G	Cedar Hill, TX, U.S.	Cedar Hill	Michigan
44	Hassan Adams	6-4	185	G	Los Angeles, CA, U.S.	Westchester	Arizona
50	Michael Thompson	6-11	255	C	New Lenox, IL, U.S.	Providence Catholic	Duke
54	Paul Davis	6-11	250	C	Rochester, MI, U.S.	Rochester	Michigan State

=== Coaches ===
The East team was coached by:

- Head Coach Bob Farrell of Seton Hall Preparatory School (West Orange, New Jersey)
- Asst Coach T.J. Whitaker of Seton Hall Preparatory School (West Orange, New Jersey)

The West team was coached by:

- Head Coach Gary McKnight of Mater Dei High School (Santa Ana, California)
- Asst Coach David Taylor of Mater Dei High School (Santa Ana, California)

== All-American Week ==
=== Contest winners ===
- The 2002 Slam Dunk contest was won by Carmelo Anthony.
- The 2002 3-point shoot-out was won by JJ Redick.
