= 2003–04 North Carolina Tar Heels men's basketball team =

American college basketball season

2003–04 North Carolina Tar Heels men's basketball

NCAA tournament, Round of 32
- Conference: Atlantic Coast Conference

Ranking
- Coaches: No. 22
- AP: No. 18
- Record: 19–11 (8–8 ACC)
- Head coach: Roy Williams (1st season)
- Assistant coaches: Joe Holladay (1st season); Steve Robinson (1st season); Jerod Haase (1st season); C. B. McGrath (1st season)
- Home arena: Dean Smith Center

2003–04 ACC men's basketball standings
| | Conf. | | | | Overall |
| Team | W | | L | PCT | W | | L | PCT |
|---|---|---|---|---|---|---|---|---|
| No. 6 Duke | 13 | – | 3 | .813 | 31 | – | 6 | .838 |
| No. 15 NC State | 11 | – | 5 | .688 | 21 | – | 10 | .677 |
| No. 17 Wake Forest | 9 | – | 7 | .563 | 21 | – | 10 | .677 |
| No. 14 Georgia Tech | 9 | – | 7 | .563 | 28 | – | 10 | .737 |
| No. 18 North Carolina | 8 | – | 8 | .500 | 19 | – | 11 | .633 |
| No. 19 Maryland† | 7 | – | 9 | .438 | 20 | – | 12 | .625 |
| Florida State | 6 | – | 10 | .375 | 19 | – | 14 | .576 |
| Virginia | 6 | – | 10 | .375 | 18 | – | 13 | .581 |
| Clemson | 3 | – | 13 | .188 | 10 | – | 18 | .357 |
† 2004 ACC tournament winner Rankings from AP Poll

The 2003–04 North Carolina Tar Heels men's basketball team represented the University of North Carolina at Chapel Hill during the 2003–04 NCAA Division I men's basketball season. Their head coach was Roy Williams. No team captains were selected for this season, the first, and so far, only time this has happened in program history. The team played its home games in the Dean Smith Center in Chapel Hill, North Carolina as a member of the Atlantic Coast Conference.

== Roster ==
2003–04 North Carolina Tar Heels men's basketball team
Players
Coaches

| Pos. | # | Name | Height | Weight | Year | Previous school | Hometown |
|---|---|---|---|---|---|---|---|
| G | 1 | Melvin Scott | 6 ft 2 in (1.88 m) | 190 lb (86 kg) | Jr | Southern | Baltimore, Maryland |
| G | 2 | Raymond Felton | 6 ft 1 in (1.85 m) | 194 lb (88 kg) | So | Latta | Latta, South Carolina |
| F | 3 | Reyshawn Terry | 6 ft 7.5 in (2.02 m) | 214 lb (97 kg) | Fr | R.J. Reynolds | Winston-Salem, North Carolina |
| G | 5 | Jackie Manuel | 6 ft 5 in (1.96 m) | 198 lb (90 kg) | Jr | Cardinal Newman | West Palm Beach, Florida |
| G | 11 | Wes Miller (I) | 5 ft 11.75 in (1.82 m) | 186 lb (84 kg) | So | New Hampton Prep | Greensboro, North Carolina |
| G | 15 | Damien Price (W) | 6 ft 0 in (1.83 m) | 208 lb (94 kg) | Sr | Dudley | Charlotte, North Carolina |
| F | 21 | Jawad Williams | 6 ft 9 in (2.06 m) | 223 lb (101 kg) | Jr | St. Edward | Cleveland, Ohio |
| F | 22 | Justin Bohlander (W) | 6 ft 8 in (2.03 m) | 200 lb (91 kg) | Fr | R.J. Reynolds | Winston-Salem, North Carolina |
| G | 24 | Jesse Holley | 6 ft 3 in (1.91 m) | 190 lb (86 kg) | Fr | Abraham Clark | Roselle Park, New Jersey |
| C | 25 | Damion Grant | 6 ft 11 in (2.11 m) | 262 lb (119 kg) | So | Brewster Academy | Portland, Jamaica |
| F | 30 | Phillip McLamb (W) | 6 ft 6 in (1.98 m) | 218 lb (99 kg) | Sr | Charlotte Country Day | Charlotte, North Carolina |
| G | 31 | Jonathan Miller (W) | 6 ft 1 in (1.85 m) | 192 lb (87 kg) | Sr | Williams | Burlington, North Carolina |
| G/F | 32 | Rashad McCants | 6 ft 4 in (1.93 m) | 207 lb (94 kg) | So | New Hampton Prep | Asheville, North Carolina |
| G/F | 34 | David Noel | 6 ft 6 in (1.98 m) | 223 lb (101 kg) | So | Southern Durham | Durham, North Carolina |
| G | 35 | C.J. Hooker | 6 ft 1 in (1.85 m) | 185 lb (84 kg) | Jr | Palmer | Palmer, Alaska |
| F | 41 | Byron Sanders | 6 ft 9 in (2.06 m) | 228 lb (103 kg) | So | Harrison Central | Gulfport, Mississippi |
| F/C | 42 | Sean May | 6 ft 8 in (2.03 m) | 260 lb (118 kg) | So | Bloomington North | Bloomington, Indiana |

Head coach

Roy Williams

Assistant coach(es)

Joe Holladay, Steve Robinson, Jerod Haase, C. B. McGrath

Legend

- (C) Team captain
- (S) Suspended
- (I) Ineligible
- (W) Walk-on
- Injured
- Current redshirt

Roster
Last update: April 14, 2017

Wes Miller was not eligible to play this season because he transferred from James Madison.

After playing as a walk-on in the previous season, David Noel received a basketball scholarship to play beginning with this season.

== Schedule and results ==
After Matt Doherty resigned from the men's basketball coaching position at the end of the previous season, Dean Smith once again sought to persuade Roy Williams to take the vacant position. This time Williams accepted, becoming the head coach of the Tar Heels on April 14, 2003.

After the annual Blue-White Scrimmage and two exhibition games against North Carolina Central (then playing in NCAA Division II conference CIAA) and Team Nike, Williams' first game with the Tar Heels was against Old Dominion on November 22, 2003. Williams received a standing ovation as he stepped onto the court of the sold out Smith Center. With Smith and Bill Guthridge in attendance, the Tar Heels beat Old Dominion 90-64. The win was Williams' 419th career win.

The 115 points scored against George Mason were the most points Tar Heel team had scored against an opponent since 1994.

The triple-overtime loss to Wake Forest at home set several program records. The 114 points scored in this game are the most points scored in a Tar Heel loss. The Wake Forest loss was only the fifth time a game went into triple overtime in program history. The last time a game went into triple overtime prior to this season was in the 1982-83 season against Tulane (also the team, albeit in 1976, that the Tar Heels played against to set the program and ACC record of four overtimes). The 119 points that Wake Forest scored are the most points an opponent has scored over the Tar Heels, breaking the 112 points Maryland scored at Cole Field House in the previous season. Those points are also the most an opponent has scored against the Tar Heels in the Smith Center.

Both teams scored 16 points in the first overtime. The Tar Heels' 16 points are the Tar Heels' third most points in an overtime period, and Wake Forest's 16 points are the second most points a Tar Heel opponent has scored in halftime. In the second overtime, both teams only scored two points, respectfully the fewest points the Tar Heels and one of their opponents have scored in a halftime. The 13 points Wake Forest scored in the third overtime are the third most points a Tar Heel opponent has scored in an overtime.

The win against Miami was the 200th win in the Smith Center.

The Tar Heels beat Connecticut for the second consecutive year. The win was also the Tar Heels' tenth win over a number one ranked team (according to the AP Poll). At the time, the Tar Heels tied UCLA for most wins over a number one ranked team. (The Tar Heels now own this record outright, with 13 wins over number one ranked teams to UCLA's 12.)

The Tar Heels finished with their first winning record in two seasons, 17-10, but only finished fifth in ACC play with a conference record of 8-8. They were eliminated in the quarterfinals of the 2004 ACC men's basketball tournament by Georgia Tech. However, their overall record by the time of their loss in the ACC Tournament allowed them to play in the 2004 NCAA Division I men's basketball tournament. The Tar Heels' NCAA tournament run ended with a defeat against Texas in the tournament's Second Round.

| Date time, TV | Rank^{#} | Opponent^{#} | Result | Record | High points | High rebounds | High assists | Site (attendance) city, state |
Exhibition
| November 2, 2003*; 2:00 pm | | Blue-White Game; Scrimmage | | | | | | Dean Smith Center (8,178); Chapel Hill, NC |
| November 8, 2003*; 4:45 pm (Note: The game was held between 4:45 and 5:15 pm, after a home football game against Wake Forest.) | | North Carolina Central; Exhibition | W 97-59 | 0–0 | 26 – McCants | 10 – May | 12 – Felton | Dean Smith Center (16,658); Chapel Hill, NC |
| November 13, 2003*; 7:30 pm | | Team Nike; Exhibition | W 104-72 | 0–0 | 22 – Tied | 16 – May | 12 – Felton | Dean Smith Center; Chapel Hill, NC |
Regular Season
| November 22, 2003*; 8:00 pm, RJ | No. 9 | Old Dominion | W 90–64 | 1–0 | 18 – McCants | 7 – May | 8 – McCants | Dean Smith Center (21,750); Chapel Hill, NC |
| November 24, 2003*; 7:00 pm, ESPN2 | No. 9 | vs. Davidson | W 91–68 | 2–0 | 28 – J. Williams | 4 – Tied | 12 – Felton | Charlotte Coliseum (16,356); Charlotte, NC |
| November 29, 2003*; 4:00 pm, RJ | No. 9 | at Cleveland State | W 82–76 | 3–0 | 24 – J. Williams | 13 – Tied | 7 – Felton | CSU Convocation Center (11,534); Cleveland, OH |
| December 2, 2003*; 9:00 pm, ESPN | No. 10 | vs. No. 11 Illinois; ACC–Big Ten Challenge | W 88–81 | 4–0 | 23 – May | 14 – May | 5 – Tied | Greensboro Coliseum (16,211); Greensboro, NC |
| December 7, 2003*; 1:00 pm, RSN | No. 10 | George Mason | W 115–81 | 5–0 | 26 – May | 6 – Tied | 18 – Felton | Dean Smith Center (19,891); Chapel Hill, NC |
| December 14, 2003*; 1:00 pm, RSN | No. 7 | Akron | W 64–53 | 6–0 | 14 – McCants | 21 – May | 3 – Scott | Dean Smith Center (17,051); Chapel Hill, NC |
| December 20, 2003; 4:00 pm, RSN | No. 4 | No. 14 Wake Forest | L 114–119 ^{3OT} | 6–1 (0–1) | 25 – McCants | 12 – J. Williams | 11 – Felton | Dean Smith Center (21,750); Chapel Hill, NC |
| December 28, 2003*; 1:00 pm, RJ | No. 9 | vs. UNC Wilmington | W 71–54 | 7–1 | 19 – Scott | 8 – Tied | 6 – Felton | Myrtle Beach Center (6,750); Myrtle Beach, SC |
| December 30, 2003*; 8:00 pm | No. 9 | Coastal Carolina | W 105–72 | 8–1 | 28 – McCants | 7 – Tied | 10 – Felton | Dean Smith Center (18,793); Chapel Hill, NC |
| January 3, 2004*; 12:00 pm, CBS | No. 9 | at No. 8 Kentucky; Rivalry | L 56–61 | 8–2 | 16 – Scott | 6 – May | 5 – Felton | Rupp Arena (23,014); Lexington, KY |
| January 7, 2004*; 7:00 pm, ESPN | No. 12 | Miami (FL) | W 89–64 | 9–2 | 23 – May | 16 – May | 8 – Felton | Dean Smith Center (21,073); Chapel Hill, NC |
| January 11, 2004; 8:00 pm, Fox Sports | No. 12 | No. 8 Georgia Tech | W 103–88 | 10–2 (1–1) | 28 – May | 8 – Tied | 9 – Felton | Dean Smith Center (21,750); Chapel Hill, NC |
| January 14, 2004; 9:00 pm, ESPN | No. 9 | at Maryland | L 84–90 | 10–3 (1–2) | 18 – May | 10 – Noel | 7 – Felton | Comcast Center (17,950); College Park, MD |
| January 17, 2004*; 3:30 pm, CBS | No. 9 | No. 1 Connecticut | W 86–83 | 11–3 | 27 – McCants | 11 – May | 7 – Tied | Dean Smith Center (21,750); Chapel Hill, NC |
| January 22, 2004; 7:00 pm, ESPN2 | No. 7 | at Florida State | L 81–90 ^{OT} | 11–4 (1–3) | 26 – McCants | 10 – May | 9 – Felton | Tallahassee Civic Center (11,562); Tallahassee, FL |
| January 24, 2004; 12:00 pm, ESPN | No. 7 | Virginia | W 96–77 | 12–4 (2–3) | 26 – McCants | 7 – Manuel | 8 – Felton | Dean Smith Center (20,874); Chapel Hill, NC |
| January 28, 2004; 7:00 pm, ESPN | No. 12 | NC State; Carolina–State Game | W 68–66 | 13–4 (3–3) | 14 – Felton | 10 – May | 5 – Felton | Dean Smith Center (21,750); Chapel Hill, NC |
| January 31, 2004; 12:00 pm, RJ | No. 12 | at Clemson | L 72–81 | 13–5 (3–4) | 26 – McCants | 6 – J. Williams | 7 – Felton | Littlejohn Coliseum (10,000); Clemson, SC |
| February 5, 2004; 9:00 pm, ESPN2 | No. 17 | No. 1 Duke; Carolina–Duke rivalry | L 81–83 ^{OT} | 13–6 (3–5) | 27 – McCants | 21 – May | 8 – Felton | Dean Smith Center (21,750); Chapel Hill, NC |
| February 7, 2004; 1:00 pm, CBS | No. 17 | at No. 16 Wake Forest | W 79–73 | 14–6 (4–5) | 28 – Scott | 10 – May | 4 – Felton | LJVM Coliseum (14,665); Winston-Salem, NC |
| February 10, 2004; 9:00 pm, RJ | No. 14 | at No. 15 Georgia Tech | L 77–88 | 14–7 (4–6) | 31 – McCants | 8 – May | 6 – Felton | Alexander Coliseum (9,191); Atlanta, GA |
| February 15, 2004; 3:30 pm, ABC | No. 14 | Maryland | W 97–86 | 15–7 (5–6) | 25 – McCants | 12 – May | 6 – Felton | Dean Smith Center (21,750); Chapel Hill, NC |
| February 21, 2004; 1:00 pm, ABC | No. 16 | Florida State | W 78–71 | 16–7 (6–6) | 21 – McCants | 10 – Tied | 7 – Felton | Dean Smith Center (20,473); Chapel Hill, NC |
| February 24, 2004; 8:00 pm, RJ | No. 12 | at Virginia | L 72–74 | 16–8 (6–7) | 20 – May | 9 – Tied | 6 – Felton | University Hall (7,429); Charlottesville, VA |
| February 29, 2004; 5:30 pm, Fox Sports | No. 12 | at No. 14 NC State; Carolina–State Game | W 71–64 | 17–8 (7–7) | 22 – McCants | 8 – May | 4 – Felton | RBC Arena (19,722); Raleigh, NC |
| March 2, 2004; 9:00 pm, RJ | No. 14 | Clemson | W 69–53 | 18–8 (8–7) | 30 – McCants | 7 – May | 9 – Felton | Dean Smith Center (20,818); Chapel Hill, NC |
| March 6, 2004; 9:00 pm, ESPN | No. 14 | at No. 3 Duke; Carolina–Duke rivalry | L 64–70 | 18–9 (8–8) | 20 – McCants | 15 – May | 4 – Noel | Cameron Indoor Stadium (9,314); Durham, NC |
ACC Tournament
| March 12, 2004; 2:30 pm, ESPN | (5) No. 16 | vs. (4) No. 14 Georgia Tech; Quarterfinals | L 82–83 | 18–10 | 27 – May | 8 – May | 6 – Felton | Greensboro Coliseum (23,745); Greensboro, NC |
NCAA tournament
| March 18, 2004; 10:40 pm, CBS | (6 S) No. 18 | vs. (11 S) Air Force; First Round | W 63–52 | 19–10 | 14 – May | 9 – J. Williams | 5 – Felton | Pepsi Center (19,405); Denver, CO |
| March 20, 2004; 9:10 pm, CBS | (6 S) No. 18 | vs. (3 S) No. 12 Texas; Second Round | L 75–78 | 19–11 | 27 – McCants | 9 – May | 6 – Tied | Pepsi Center (19,405); Denver, CO |
*Non-conference game. ^{#}Rankings from AP Poll. (#) Tournament seedings in parentheses. S=South. All times are in EST.
