= 2003–04 Georgia Tech Yellow Jackets men's basketball team =

American college basketball season

2003–04 Georgia Tech Yellow Jackets men's basketball

NCAA tournament, Runner-up Preseason NIT Champions

National Championship Game, L 73-82 vs. Connecticut
- Conference: Atlantic Coast Conference

Ranking
- Coaches: No. 3
- AP: No. 14
- Record: 28–10 (9–7 ACC)
- Head coach: Paul Hewitt (4th season)
- Home arena: McCamish Pavilion

2003–04 ACC men's basketball standings
	Conf.				Overall
Team	W		L	PCT	W		L	PCT
No. 6 Duke	13	–	3	.813	31	–	6	.838
No. 15 NC State	11	–	5	.688	21	–	10	.677
No. 17 Wake Forest	9	–	7	.563	21	–	10	.677
No. 14 Georgia Tech	9	–	7	.563	28	–	10	.737
No. 18 North Carolina	8	–	8	.500	19	–	11	.633
No. 19 Maryland†	7	–	9	.438	20	–	12	.625
Florida State	6	–	10	.375	19	–	14	.576
Virginia	6	–	10	.375	18	–	13	.581
Clemson	3	–	13	.188	10	–	18	.357
† 2004 ACC tournament winner Rankings from AP Poll

The 2003–04 Georgia Tech Yellow Jackets men's basketball team represented the Georgia Institute of Technology as a member of the Atlantic Coast Conference during the 2003–04 season. Led by fourth year head coach Paul Hewitt, the Yellow Jackets made their best finish to date in the NCAA Tournament, battling all the way to the national championship game, where they eventually fell to UConn – the consensus favorite entering the season, but a team the Jackets handled in the Preseason NIT. Georgia Tech finished the season with an overall record of 28–10 (9–7 ACC).

== Roster ==
2003–04 Georgia Tech Yellow Jackets men's basketball team
Players
Coaches

Pos.	#	Name	Height	Weight	Year	Hometown
G	1	B. J. Elder	6 ft 4 in (1.93 m)	218 lb (99 kg)	Jr	Madison, GA
F	2	Isma'il Muhammad	6 ft 6 in (1.98 m)	228 lb (103 kg)	Jr	Atlanta, GA
G	3	Jarrett Jack	6 ft 3 in (1.91 m)	200 lb (91 kg)	So	Fort Washington, MD
G	5	Mario West	6 ft 5 in (1.96 m)	210 lb (95 kg)	So	Douglasville, GA
F	10	Jim Nyström	6 ft 4 in (1.93 m)	210 lb (95 kg)	So	Stockholm, Sweden
G	11	Will Bynum	6 ft 0 in (1.83 m)	185 lb (84 kg)	Jr	Chicago, IL
C	12	Luke Schenscher	7 ft 1 in (2.16 m)	255 lb (116 kg)	Jr	Canberra, Australia
G	14	Keith Jones	6 ft 2 in (1.88 m)	195 lb (88 kg)	Fr	Austell, GA
G	24	Marvin Lewis	6 ft 4 in (1.93 m)	205 lb (93 kg)	Sr	Germantown, MD
F	34	Robert Brooks	6 ft 8 in (2.03 m)	210 lb (95 kg)	Sr	Saginaw, MI
F	42	Clarence Moore	6 ft 5 in (1.96 m)	215 lb (98 kg)	Sr	Norco, LA
F	44	Theodis Tarver	6 ft 9 in (2.06 m)	245 lb (111 kg)	So	Monroe, LA
G	51	David Nelson	5 ft 10 in (1.78 m)	165 lb (75 kg)	Sr	Syracuse, NY
G	55	Anthony McHenry	6 ft 7 in (2.01 m)	220 lb (100 kg)	Jr	Birmingham, AL

Head coach

- Paul Hewitt (St. John Fisher)

Assistant coach(es)

Legend

- (C) Team captain
- (S) Suspended
- (I) Ineligible
- (W) Walk-on
- Injured
- Current redshirt

== Schedule and results ==
Date time, TV	Rank^{#}	Opponent^{#}	Result	Record	Site city, state
Regular Season
Nov 18, 2003*		Louisiana–Lafayette	W 79–45	1–0	Alexander Memorial Coliseum; Atlanta, Georgia
Nov 20, 2003*		Hofstra	W 75–56	2–0	Alexander Memorial Coliseum; Atlanta, Georgia
Nov 23, 2003*		at Cornell	W 90–69	3–0	Newman Arena; Ithaca, New York
Nov 26, 2003*		vs. No. 1 Connecticut; Preseason NIT	W 77–61	4–0	Madison Square Garden; New York, New York
Nov 28, 2003*		vs. Texas Tech; Preseason NIT	W 85–65	5–0	Madison Square Garden; New York, New York
Dec 3, 2003*	No. 13	at Ohio State	W 73–53	6–0	Value City Arena; Columbus, Ohio
Dec 6, 2003*	No. 13	Tennessee State	W 94–43	7–0	Alexander Memorial Coliseum; Atlanta, Georgia
Dec 13, 2003*	No. 10	Saint Louis	W 75–62	8–0	Alexander Memorial Coliseum; Atlanta, Georgia
Dec 17, 2003*	No. 5	Alabama A&M	W 74–41	9–0	Alexander Memorial Coliseum; Atlanta, Georgia
Dec 21, 2003*	No. 5	St. John's	W 79–66	10–0	Alexander Memorial Coliseum; Atlanta, Georgia
Dec 23, 2003*	No. 4	Marist	W 90–40	11–0	Alexander Memorial Coliseum; Atlanta, Georgia
Dec 29, 2003*	No. 4	VCU	W 86–65	12–0	Alexander Memorial Coliseum; Atlanta, Georgia
Jan 3, 2004*	No. 3	at Georgia	L 80–83 ^{2OT}	12–1	Stegeman Coliseum; Athens, Georgia
Jan 11, 2004	No. 8	at No. 12 North Carolina	L 88–103	12–2 (0–1)	Dean Smith Center; Chapel Hill, North Carolina
Jan 15, 2004	No. 8	Virginia	W 75–57	13–2 (1–1)	Alexander Memorial Coliseum; Atlanta, Georgia
Jan 17, 2004	No. 12	Maryland	W 81–71	14–2 (2–1)	Alexander Memorial Coliseum; Atlanta, Georgia
Jan 20, 2004	No. 11	at No. 10 Wake Forest	W 73–66	15–2 (3–1)	Lawrence Joel Veterans Memorial Coliseum; Winston-Salem, North Carolina
Jan 24, 2004	No. 11	at NC State	L 72–76	15–3 (3–2)	RBC Center; Raleigh, North Carolina
Jan 27, 2004	No. 14	Clemson	W 76–69	16–3 (4–2)	Alexander Memorial Coliseum; Atlanta, Georgia
Jan 31, 2004	No. 14	No. 1 Duke	L 74–82	16–4 (4–3)	Alexander Memorial Coliseum; Atlanta, Georgia
Feb 3, 2004*	No. 15	at Florida State	L 65–81	16–5 (4–4)	Tallahassee-Leon County Civic Center; Tallahassee, Florida
Feb 7, 2004*	No. 15	at Tennessee	W 77–62	17–5	Thompson-Boling Arena; Knoxville, Tennessee
Feb 10, 2004	No. 15	No. 14 North Carolina	W 88–77	18–5 (5–4)	Alexander Memorial Coliseum; Atlanta, Georgia
Feb 14, 2004	No. 15	at Virginia	L 80–82	18–6 (5–5)	University Hall; Charlottesville, Virginia
Feb 19, 2004	No. 18	at Maryland	W 75–64	19–6 (6–5)	Comcast Center; College Park, Maryland
Feb 22, 2004	No. 18	No. 15 Wake Forest	L 76–80	19–7 (6–6)	Alexander Memorial Coliseum; Atlanta, Georgia
Feb 25, 2004	No. 18	No. 14 NC State	L 69–79	19–8 (6–7)	Alexander Memorial Coliseum; Atlanta, Georgia
Feb 28, 2004	No. 18	at Clemson	W 79–60	20–8 (7–7)	Littlejohn Coliseum; Clemson, South Carolina
Mar 3, 2004	No. 19	at No. 3 Duke	W 76–68	21–8 (8–7)	Cameron Indoor Stadium; Durham, NC
Mar 6, 2004	No. 19	Florida State	W 63–60	22–8 (9–7)	Alexander Memorial Coliseum; Atlanta, GA
ACC Tournament
Mar 12, 2004*	No. 14	at No. 16 North Carolina; ACC Tournament Quarterfinal	W 83–82	23–8	Greensboro Coliseum; Greensboro, NC
Mar 13, 2004*	No. 14	vs. No. 5 Duke; ACC Tournament Semifinal	L 71–85	23–9	Greensboro Coliseum; Greensboro, NC
NCAA Tournament
Mar 19, 2004*	(3 MW) No. 14	vs. (14 MW) Northern Iowa; First Round	W 65–60	24–9	Bradley Center; Milwaukee, WI
Mar 21, 2004*	(3 MW) No. 14	vs. (6 MW) No. 25 Boston College; Second Round	W 57–54	25–9	Bradley Center; Milwaukee, WI
Mar 26, 2004*	(3 MW) No. 14	vs. (10 MW) Nevada; Sweet Sixteen	W 72–67	26–9	Edward Jones Dome; St. Louis, MO
Mar 28, 2004*	(3 MW) No. 14	vs. (4 MW) No. 16 Kansas; Elite Eight	W 79–71 ^{OT}	27–9	Edward Jones Dome; St. Louis, MO
Apr 3, 2004*	(3 MW) No. 14	vs. (2 E) No. 4 Oklahoma State; Final Four	W 67–65	28–9	Alamodome; San Antonio, TX
Apr 5, 2004*	(3 MW) No. 14	vs. (2 W) No. 7 Connecticut; National Championship	L 73–82	28–10	Alamodome; San Antonio, TX
*Non-conference game. ^{#}Rankings from AP Poll. (#) Tournament seedings in parentheses.
