= 1999 MAAC men's basketball tournament =

- Classification: Division I
- Season: 1998–99
- Teams: 10
- Site: Marine Midland Arena; Buffalo, New York
- Champions: Siena (1st title)
- Winning coach: Paul Hewitt (1st title)
- MVP: Marcus Faison (Siena)

1998–99 MAAC men's basketball standings
	Conf.				Overall
Team	W		L	PCT	W		L	PCT
Niagara	13	–	5	.722	17	–	12	.586
Siena †	13	–	5	.722	25	–	6	.806
Iona	12	–	6	.667	16	–	14	.533
Canisius	11	–	7	.611	15	–	12	.556
Saint Peter's	10	–	8	.556	14	–	15	.483
Marist	8	–	10	.444	16	–	12	.571
Rider	7	–	11	.389	12	–	16	.429
Fairfield	7	–	11	.389	12	–	15	.444
Loyola (MD)	6	–	12	.333	13	–	15	.464
Manhattan	3	–	15	.167	5	–	22	.185
† 1999 MAAC tournament winner Rankings from AP Poll

The 1999 MAAC men's basketball tournament was held February 26–March 1, 1999 at Marine Midland Arena in Buffalo, New York.

Second-seeded Siena defeated Saint Peter's in the championship game, 82–67, to win their first MAAC men's basketball tournament.

The Saints received an automatic bid to the 1999 NCAA tournament.

== Format ==
All ten of the conference's members participated in the tournament field. They were seeded based on regular season conference records.

== Bracket ==
First round Friday, February 26
8	Fairfield	72
9	Loyola (MD)	75
7	Rider	73
10	Manhattan	46

Quarterfinals; Saturday, February 27
1	Niagara	78
9	Loyola (MD)	77
4	Canisius	72
5	Saint Peter's	80
2	Siena	101
7	Rider	73
3	Iona	69
6	Marist	71

Semifinals; Sunday, February 28
1	Niagara	70
5	Saint Peter's	78
2	Siena	56
6	Marist	55

Championship; Monday, March 1
5	Saint Peter's	67
2	Siena	82
