= 2003–04 Wake Forest Demon Deacons men's basketball team =

American college basketball season

2003–04 Wake Forest Demon Deacons men's basketball

NCAA tournament, Sweet Sixteen
- Conference: Atlantic Coast Conference

Ranking
- Coaches: No. 15
- AP: No. 17
- Record: 21–10 (9–7 ACC)
- Head coach: Skip Prosser (3rd season)
- Assistant coach: Dino Gaudio (3rd season)
- MVP: Taron Downey
- Captains: Taron Downey; Jamaal Levy; Justin Gray
- Home arena: LJVM Coliseum

2003–04 ACC men's basketball standings
	Conf.				Overall
Team	W		L	PCT	W		L	PCT
No. 6 Duke	13	–	3	.813	31	–	6	.838
No. 15 NC State	11	–	5	.688	21	–	10	.677
No. 17 Wake Forest	9	–	7	.563	21	–	10	.677
No. 14 Georgia Tech	9	–	7	.563	28	–	10	.737
No. 18 North Carolina	8	–	8	.500	19	–	11	.633
No. 19 Maryland†	7	–	9	.438	20	–	12	.625
Florida State	6	–	10	.375	19	–	14	.576
Virginia	6	–	10	.375	18	–	13	.581
Clemson	3	–	13	.188	10	–	18	.357
† 2004 ACC tournament winner Rankings from AP Poll

The 2003–04 Wake Forest Demon Deacons men's basketball team represented Wake Forest University during the 2003–04 NCAA Division I men's basketball season.

== Roster ==
2003–04 Wake Forest Demon Deacons men's basketball team
Players	Coaches
Pos. / # / Name / Height / Weight / Year / Previous school / Hometown; PG / 3 / Chris Paul / 6 ft 0 in (1.83 m) / 175 lb (79 kg) / Fr / West Forsyth / Lewisville, North Carolina	Head coach: Skip Prosser; Assistant coach(es) Legend: (C) Team captain; (S) Suspended; (I) Ineligible; (W) Walk-on; Injured; Current redshirt; Roster; Last update: August 22, 2020

== Schedule and results ==
Date time, TV	Rank^{#}	Opponent^{#}	Result	Record	Site city, state
Regular season
November 20*	No. 20	vs. Memphis; Coaches vs. Cancer Classic	W 85–76	1–0	Madison Square Garden; New York, NY
November 22*	No. 18	Elon	W 97–55	2–0	LJVM Coliseum; Winston-Salem, NC
November 29*	No. 18	at Yale	W 86–61	3–0	Bridgeport, CT
December 2*	No. 18	Indiana; ACC–Big Ten Challenge	W 100–67	4–0	LJVM Coliseum; Winston-Salem, NC
December 6*	No. 18	Richmond	W 81–66	5–0	LJVM Coliseum; Winston-Salem, NC
December 15*	No. 14	at SMU	W 78–66	6–0	Dallas, TX
December 20	No. 14	at No. 4 North Carolina	W 119–114 ^{3OT}	7–0 (1–0)	Dean Smith Center; Chapel Hill, NC
December 30*	No. 6	North Carolina A&T	W 91–67	8–0	LJVM Coliseum; Winston-Salem, NC
January 3*	No. 6	New Mexico	W 70–61	9–0	LJVM Coliseum; Winston-Salem, NC
January 6*	No. 5	Brown	W 86–47	10–0	LJVM Coliseum; Winston-Salem, NC
January 10	No. 5	Clemson	W 78–63	11–0 (2–0)	LJVM Coliseum; Winston-Salem, NC
January 13*	No. 4	at No. 18 Texas	L 81–94	11–1	Austin, TX
January 17	No. 4	at No. 2 Duke	L 72–84	11–2 (2–1)	Cameron Indoor Stadium; Durham, NC
January 20	No. 10	No. 11 Georgia Tech	L 66–73	11–3 (2–2)	LJVM Coliseum; Winston-Salem, NC
January 25	No. 10	at Florida State	L 70–75	11–4 (2–3)	Tallahassee, FL
January 29	No. 19	Maryland	W 93–85	12–4 (3–3)	LJVM Coliseum; Winston-Salem, NC
January 31	No. 19	Virginia	W 91–78	13–4 (4–3)	LJVM Coliseum; Winston-Salem, NC
February 4		at NC State	L 68–73	13–5 (4–4)	Raleigh, NC
February 7 CBS	No. 16	No. 17 North Carolina	L 73–79	13–6 (4–5)	LJVM Coliseum; Winston-Salem, NC
February 12	No. 20	at Clemson	W 82–67	14–6 (5–5)	Littlejohn Coliseum; Clemson, SC
February 15*	No. 20	No. 13 Cincinnati	W 91–85	15–6	LJVM Coliseum; Winston-Salem, NC
February 18	No. 15	No. 3 Duke	W 90–84	16–6 (6–5)	LJVM Coliseum; Winston-Salem, NC
February 22	No. 15	at No. 18 Georgia Tech	W 80–76	17–6 (7–5)	Atlanta, GA
February 25	No. 11	Florida State	W 90–87 ^{OT}	18–6 (8–5)	LJVM Coliseum; Winston-Salem, NC
February 28	No. 11	at Maryland	W 91–83	19–6 (9–5)	College Park, MD
March 2	No. 11	at Virginia	L 82–84	19–7 (9–6)	Charlottesville, VA
March 6	No. 11	No. 16 NC State	L 70–81	19–8 (9–7)	LJVM Coliseum; Winston-Salem, NC
ACC tournament
March 12*	No. 15	vs. Maryland; ACC tournament	L 86–87	19–9	Greensboro, NC
NCAA tournament
March 18*; CBS	(4) No. 17	vs. (13) VCU; First Round	W 79–78	20–9	Raleigh, NC
March 20*; CBS	(4) No. 17	vs. (12) Manhattan; Second Round	W 84–80	21–9	Raleigh, NC
March 25*; 10:00 p.m., CBS	(4) No. 17	vs. (1) No. 5 St. Joseph's; Sweet Sixteen	L 80–84	21–10	East Rutherford, NJ
*Non-conference game. ^{#}Rankings from AP Poll. (#) Tournament seedings in parentheses. All times are in Eastern Standard Time.
