= 1998–99 Siena Saints men's basketball team =

American college basketball season

1998–99 Siena Saints men's basketball

MAAC regular season co-champions MAAC tournament champions

NCAA tournament, first round
- Conference: Metro Atlantic Athletic Conference
- Record: 25–6 (13–5 MAC)
- Head coach: Paul Hewitt (2nd season)
- Home arena: Pepsi Arena

1998–99 MAAC men's basketball standings
	Conf.				Overall
Team	W		L	PCT	W		L	PCT
Niagara	13	–	5	.722	17	–	12	.586
Siena †	13	–	5	.722	25	–	6	.806
Iona	12	–	6	.667	16	–	14	.533
Canisius	11	–	7	.611	15	–	12	.556
Saint Peter's	10	–	8	.556	14	–	15	.483
Marist	8	–	10	.444	16	–	12	.571
Rider	7	–	11	.389	12	–	16	.429
Fairfield	7	–	11	.389	12	–	15	.444
Loyola (MD)	6	–	12	.333	13	–	15	.464
Manhattan	3	–	15	.167	5	–	22	.185
† 1999 MAAC tournament winner Rankings from AP Poll

The 1998–99 Siena Saints men's basketball team represented Siena College in the 1998–99 college basketball season. This was head coach Paul Hewitt's second season at Siena. The Saints competed in the Metro Atlantic Athletic Conference (MAAC) and played their home games at Pepsi Arena in Albany, New York. They finished the season 25–6, 13–5 in MAAC play to end up second in the regular season standings. They won the 1999 MAAC men's basketball tournament to earn the conference's automatic bid to the 1999 NCAA Division I men's basketball tournament. The Saints received the 13 seed in the West region where they were defeated by No. 4 seed Arkansas in the opening round.

== Roster ==
1998–99 Siena Saints men's basketball team
Players	Coaches
Pos. / # / Name / Height / Weight / Year / Hometown; G / 24 / Dwayne Archbold / 6 ft 6 in (1.98 m) / 185 lb (84 kg) / Fr / Brooklyn, New York	Head coach: Rob Lanier; Assistant coach(es) Legend: (C) Team captain; (S) Suspended; (I) Ineligible; (W) Walk-on; Injured; Current redshirt; Roster

== Schedule and results ==
- All times are Eastern

Date time, TV	Rank^{#}	Opponent^{#}	Result	Record	Site (attendance) city, state
Regular Season
Nov 14, 1998*		at Bethune-Cookman	W 83–77	1–0	Moore Gymnasium (639); Daytona Beach, Florida
Nov 21, 1998*		at Hartford	W 86–69	2–0	Chase Arena at Reich Family Pavilion (916); Hartford, Connecticut
Nov 24, 1998*		St. Bonaventure	W 86–67	3–0	Pepsi Arena (7,739); Albany, New York
Dec 2, 1998		Loyola (MD)	W 96–88	4–0 (1–0)	Pepsi Arena (4,443); Albany, New York
Dec 4, 1998		at Marist	L 87–93	4–1 (1–1)	McCann Arena (3,195); Poughkeepsie, New York
Dec 8, 1998*		at Colgate	W 94–80	5–1	Cotterell Court (1,600); Hamilton, New York
Dec 12, 1998*		Fairleigh Dickinson	W 87–79	6–1	Pepsi Arena (4,074); Albany, New York
Dec 23, 1998*		George Washington	W 106–99	7–1	Pepsi Arena (7,401); Albany, New York
Dec 29, 1998*		vs. Eastern Michigan	W 71–70	8–1	Firestone Fieldhouse (1,200); Malibu, California
Dec 30, 1998*		at Pepperdine	W 85–76	9–1	Firestone Fieldhouse (1,632); Malibu, California
Jan 2, 1999		at Niagara	L 84–95	9–2 (1–2)	Gallagher Center (853); Lewiston, New York
Jan 5, 1999*		Quinnipiac	W 107–90	10–2	Pepsi Arena (4,173); Albany, New York
Jan 10, 1999		Canisius	W 79–78	11–2 (2–2)	Pepsi Arena (5,682); Albany, New York
Jan 12, 1999		at Fairfield	W 96–82	12–2 (3–2)	Alumni Hall (1,342); Fairfield, Connecticut
Jan 14, 1999		Saint Peter's	W 84–72	13–2 (4–2)	Pepsi Arena (3,985); Albany, New York
Jan 18, 1999		Rider	W 86–84 ^{OT}	14–2 (5–2)	Pepsi Arena (5,541); Albany, New York
Jan 21, 1999		at Loyola (MD)	W 86–78	15–2 (6–2)	Reitz Arena (1,218); Baltimore, Maryland
Jan 24, 1999		Iona	W 90–72	16–2 (7–2)	Pepsi Arena (9,549); Albany, New York
Jan 30, 1999		Marist	W 84–78	17–2 (8–2)	Pepsi Arena (11,374); Albany, New York
Feb 1, 1999		Fairfield	W 95–80	18–2 (9–2)	Pepsi Arena (5,576); Albany, New York
Feb 4, 1999		at Canisius	L 90–100 ^{2OT}	18–3 (9–3)	Koessler Athletic Center (2,404); Buffalo, New York
Feb 6, 1999		at Manhattan	W 74–58	19–3 (10–3)	Draddy Gymnasium (1,792); New York, New York
Feb 8, 1999		Niagara	L 82–86	19–4 (10–4)	Pepsi Arena (9,138); Albany, New York
Feb 11, 1999		Manhattan	W 92–75	20–4 (11–4)	Pepsi Arena (6,645); Albany, New York
Feb 14, 1999		at Rider	W 81–74	21–4 (12–4)	Alumni Gymnasium (1,514); Lawrenceville, New Jersey
Feb 19, 1999		at Saint Peter's	W 98–87	22–4 (13–4)	Yanitelli Center (1,423); Jersey City, New Jersey
Feb 21, 1999		at Iona	L 80–97	22–5 (13–5)	John A. Mulcahy Campus Events Center (3,164); New Rochelle, New York
MAAC tournament
Feb 27, 1999*		vs. Rider; Quarterfinals	W 101–73	23–5	Marine Midland Arena (NA); Buffalo, New York
Feb 28, 1999*		vs. Marist; Semifinals	W 56–55	24–5	Marine Midland Arena (7,029); Buffalo, New York
Mar 1, 1999*		vs. Saint Peter's; Championship game	W 82–67	25–5	Marine Midland Arena (5,356); Buffalo, New York
NCAA tournament
Mar 11, 1999*; CBS	(13 W)	vs. (4 W) No. 17 Arkansas; First round	L 80–94	25–6	McNichols Sports Arena (16,637); Denver, Colorado
*Non-conference game. ^{#}Rankings from AP Poll. (#) Tournament seedings in parentheses.
