= 2003–04 NC State Wolfpack men's basketball team =

American college basketball season

2003–04 NC State Wolfpack men's basketball

NCAA tournament, second round
- Conference: Atlantic Coast Conference

Ranking
- Coaches: No. 20
- AP: No. 15
- Record: 21–10 (11–5 ACC)
- Head coach: Herb Sendek (8th season)
- Home arena: RBC Center

2003–04 ACC men's basketball standings
	Conf.				Overall
Team	W		L	PCT	W		L	PCT
No. 6 Duke	13	–	3	.813	31	–	6	.838
No. 15 NC State	11	–	5	.688	21	–	10	.677
No. 17 Wake Forest	9	–	7	.563	21	–	10	.677
No. 14 Georgia Tech	9	–	7	.563	28	–	10	.737
No. 18 North Carolina	8	–	8	.500	19	–	11	.633
No. 19 Maryland†	7	–	9	.438	20	–	12	.625
Florida State	6	–	10	.375	19	–	14	.576
Virginia	6	–	10	.375	18	–	13	.581
Clemson	3	–	13	.188	10	–	18	.357
† 2004 ACC tournament winner Rankings from AP Poll

The 2003–04 NC State Wolfpack men's basketball team represented North Carolina State University as a member of the Atlantic Coast Conference during the 2003–04 men's college basketball season. It was Herb Sendek's eighth season as head coach. The Wolfpack earned a bid to the NCAA tournament, reached the second round, and finished with a record of 21–10 (11–5 ACC).

== Roster ==
2003–04 NC State Wolfpack men's basketball team
Players
Coaches

Pos.	#	Name	Height	Weight	Year	Previous school	Hometown
F	3	Ilian Evtimov	6 ft 7 in (2.01 m)	231 lb (105 kg)	RS So	Bishop McGuinness Catholic HS	Sofia, Bulgaria
G	4	Mike O'Donnell	5 ft 11 in (1.8 m)	160 lb (73 kg)	Fr	Largo HS	Largo, Florida
G	10	Chris McCoy	6 ft 5 in (1.96 m)	170 lb (77 kg)	Fr	Trinity HS	Louisville, Kentucky
G	11	Tony Bethel	6 ft 2 in (1.88 m)	175 lb (79 kg)	Jr	Montrose Christian School; Georgetown	Fort Washington, Maryland
G	12	Dominick Mejia	6 ft 4 in (1.93 m)	206 lb (93 kg)	So	Eastern Regional HS	Voorhees, New Jersey
G/F	13	Cameron Bennerman	6 ft 4 in (1.93 m)	199 lb (90 kg)	So	Grimsley HS	Greensboro, North Carolina
G	14	Engin Atsür	6 ft 3 in (1.91 m)	185 lb (84 kg)	Fr	St. Benoit HS	Istanbul, Turkey
F	21	Levi Watkins	6 ft 8 in (2.03 m)	227 lb (103 kg)	Jr	Montrose Christian School	Rockville, Maryland
F	22	Will Roach	6 ft 5 in (1.96 m)	201 lb (91 kg)	RS Jr	Broughton HS	Raleigh, North Carolina
G	23	Scooter Sherrill	6 ft 3 in (1.91 m)	186 lb (84 kg)	Sr	West Rowan HS	Mount Ulla, North Carolina
G/F	24	Julius Hodge	6 ft 7 in (2.01 m)	191 lb (87 kg)	Jr	St. Raymond HS	Harlem, New York
C	32	Jordan Collins	6 ft 10 in (2.08 m)	232 lb (105 kg)	Jr	DeMatha Catholic HS	Hyattsville, Maryland
C	34	Adam Simons	6 ft 11 in (2.11 m)	242 lb (110 kg)	RS Fr	Walter M. Williams HS	Burlington, North Carolina
F/C	54	Marcus Melvin	6 ft 8 in (2.03 m)	230 lb (104 kg)	Sr	Douglas Byrd HS	Fayetteville, North Carolina

Head coach

- Herb Sendek (Carnegie Mellon)

Assistant coach(es)

Legend

- (C) Team captain
- (S) Suspended
- (I) Ineligible
- (W) Walk-on
- Injured
- Current redshirt

Roster

== Schedule and results ==
Date time, TV	Rank^{#}	Opponent^{#}	Result	Record	Site city, state
Regular Season
Nov 21, 2003*		UNC Asheville	W 71–46	1–0	RBC Center; Raleigh, North Carolina
Nov 25, 2003*		Howard	W 71–51	2–0	RBC Center; Raleigh, North Carolina
Nov 28, 2003*		Florida A&M	W 92–62	3–0	RBC Center; Raleigh, North Carolina
Dec 2, 2003*		at Michigan; ACC–Big Ten Challenge	L 61–68	3–1	Crisler Arena; Ann Arbor, Michigan
Dec 7, 2003*		Milwaukee	W 77–71	4–1	RBC Center (10,691); Raleigh, North Carolina
Dec 13, 2003*		Hartford	W 78–49	5–1	RBC Center; Raleigh, North Carolina
Dec 20, 2003*		at South Carolina	L 55–58	5–2	Colonial Life Arena; Columbia, South Carolina
Dec 28, 2003; 8:00 p.m., FSN		Virginia	W 86–69	6–2 (1–0)	RBC Center (16,627); Raleigh, North Carolina
Jan 3, 2004*		UNC Wilmington	W 68–50	7–2	RBC Center; Raleigh, North Carolina
Jan 7, 2004*		BYU	W 89–62	8–2	RBC Center; Raleigh, North Carolina
Jan 11, 2004		at Florida State	W 58–53	9–2 (2–0)	Donald L. Tucker Civic Center; Tallahassee, Florida
Jan 15, 2004		at No. 2 Duke	L 57–76	9–3 (2–1)	Cameron Indoor Stadium; Durham, North Carolina
Jan 17, 2004		Clemson	W 86–69	10–3 (3–1)	RBC Center; Raleigh, North Carolina
Jan 20, 2004*; 6:00 p.m.		at Boston College	L 65–66 ^{OT}	10–4	Silvio O. Conte Forum; Chestnut Hill, Massachusetts
Jan 24, 2004		No. 11 Georgia Tech	W 76–72	11–4 (4–1)	RBC Center; Raleigh, North Carolina
Jan 28, 2004; 7:00 p.m., ESPN		at No. 12 North Carolina; Carolina–State Game	L 66–68	11–5 (4–2)	Dean Smith Center (21,750); Chapel Hill, North Carolina
Feb 1, 2004		at Maryland	W 81–69	12–5 (5–2)	Comcast Center; College Park, Maryland
Feb 4, 2004		No. 16 Wake Forest	W 73–68	13–5 (6–2)	RBC Center; Raleigh, North Carolina
Feb 7, 2004; 3:00 p.m., Raycom		at Virginia	W 79–63	14–5 (7–2)	University Hall (7,619); Charlottesville, Virginia
Feb 10, 2004	No. 21	Florida State	W 75–59	15–5 (8–2)	RBC Center; Raleigh, North Carolina
Feb 15, 2004	No. 21	No. 1 Duke	W 78–74	16–5 (9–2)	RBC Center; Raleigh, North Carolina
Feb 18, 2004	No. 13	at Clemson	L 55–60	16–6 (9–3)	Littlejohn Coliseum; Clemson, South Carolina
Feb 22, 2004*	No. 13	Washington; ESPN BracketBusters	W 77–72	17–6	RBC Center; Raleigh, North Carolina
Feb 25, 2004	No. 14	at No. 18 Georgia Tech	W 79–69	18–6 (10–3)	Alexander Memorial Coliseum; Atlanta, Georgia
Feb 29, 2004; 5:30 p.m., Fox Sports	No. 14	No. 12 North Carolina; Carolina–State Game	L 64–71	18–7 (10–4)	RBC Center (19,722); Raleigh, North Carolina
Mar 3, 2004	No. 16	Maryland	L 69–70	18–8 (10–5)	RBC Center; Raleigh, North Carolina
Mar 6, 2004	No. 16	at No. 11 Wake Forest	W 81–70	19–8 (11–5)	Lawrence Joel Coliseum; Winston-Salem, North Carolina
ACC Tournament
Mar 12, 2004*	(2) No. 17	(7) Florida State; Quarterfinals	W 78–71	20–8	Greensboro Coliseum; Greensboro, North Carolina
Mar 13, 2004*	(2) No. 17	(6) Maryland; Semifinals	L 82–85	20–9	Greensboro Coliseum; Greensboro, North Carolina
NCAA Tournament
Mar 19, 2004*	(3 PHX) No. 15	vs. (14 PHX) Louisiana–Lafayette; First Round	W 61–52	21–9	Amway Arena; Orlando, Florida
Mar 21, 2004*; CBS	(3 PHX) No. 15	vs. (6 PHX) Vanderbilt; Second Round	L 73–75	21–10	Amway Arena; Orlando, Florida
*Non-conference game. ^{#}Rankings from AP Poll. (#) Tournament seedings in parentheses. PHX=Phoenix. All times are in Eastern Time.
