= Sean Dockery =

American basketball player

Personal information
- Born: January 5, 1983 (age 43) Chicago, Illinois
- Listed height: 6 ft 2 in (1.88 m)
- Listed weight: 185 lb (84 kg)

Career information
- High school: Julian (Chicago, Illinois)
- College: Duke (2002–2006)
- NBA draft: 2006: undrafted
- Playing career: 2006–2008
- Position: Point guard

Career history
- 2006: Artland Dragons
- 2007: Fort Worth Flyers
- 2007: Brose Baskets
- 2007: CSU Asesoft Ploiești
- 2008: Étendard de Brest
- 2008: Edmonton Chill

Career highlights
- McDonald's All-American (2002)

Sean Areon Dockery (born January 5, 1983) is a retired American professional basketball player. He has played professionally in Canada, France, Romania and Germany, as well as in the U.S. Dockery was regarded as one of the nation's top high school point guards when he came to Duke University. He split time at point guard with Greg Paulus in his senior year.

== Senior year ==
Dockery shot 46.5% in his last season, while averaging 7.1 points, 3.0 rebounds, 2.6 assists, and a team-leading 1.7 steals per game, while starting in 32 of 36 games. His 194 career steals rank him 11th in Duke history. Dockery is perhaps best remembered for his half-court shot at the buzzer to beat Virginia Tech at Cameron Indoor Stadium during his senior year.

== Professional career ==
Before the 2006 NBA draft, Dockery was invited to the Portsmouth Invitational Tournament soon after the Blue Devils' loss to LSU. Dockery posted averages of 13.7 points, 8.3 assists, 3.0 rebounds and 1.3 steals in the PIT. Dockery also played in the Orlando Pre-Draft Camp. He posted averages of 3.7 points, 4.3 assists and 1.7 steals while playing through a pulled hip flexor. Due to these performances, some considered Dockery a potential late second round draft pick. However, Dockery was not drafted and never played for an NBA team. He played mostly in Europe, with his final professional stop being the Edmonton Chill of the International Basketball League. After playing professional basketball overseas, Dockery returned to his hometown of Chicago, IL where he established himself as a Personal Trainer/Basketball Skills & Development Instructor, founding "Dockery University." In 2016, Dockery returned to the hardwood to compete in "TBT" aka The Basketball Tournament with the Midwest Dream Squad. He scored 10 points and added 1 steal in 19 minutes of playing time. During the 2016–2017 NBA season, Dockery served as an Advance Scout for the San Antonio Spurs, followed by holding the same position with the Memphis Grizzlies for the 2017-2018 season.
