= 2003–04 Duke Blue Devils men's basketball team =

American college basketball season

2003–04 Duke Blue Devils men's basketball

ACC regular season champions

NCAA tournament, Final Four
- Conference: Atlantic Coast Conference

Ranking
- Coaches: No. 2
- AP: No. 6
- Record: 31–6 (13–3 ACC)
- Head coach: Mike Krzyzewski (24th season)
- Assistant coaches: Johnny Dawkins; Chris Collins; Steve Wojciechowski
- Home arena: Cameron Indoor Stadium

2003–04 ACC men's basketball standings
	Conf.				Overall
Team	W		L	PCT	W		L	PCT
No. 6 Duke	13	–	3	.813	31	–	6	.838
No. 15 NC State	11	–	5	.688	21	–	10	.677
No. 17 Wake Forest	9	–	7	.563	21	–	10	.677
No. 14 Georgia Tech	9	–	7	.563	28	–	10	.737
No. 18 North Carolina	8	–	8	.500	19	–	11	.633
No. 19 Maryland†	7	–	9	.438	20	–	12	.625
Florida State	6	–	10	.375	19	–	14	.576
Virginia	6	–	10	.375	18	–	13	.581
Clemson	3	–	13	.188	10	–	18	.357
† 2004 ACC tournament winner Rankings from AP Poll

The 2003–04 Duke Blue Devils men's basketball team represented Duke University in the 2003–2004 NCAA Division I basketball season. The head coach was Mike Krzyzewski, in his 24th year at Duke. The team played its home games in Cameron Indoor Stadium in Durham, North Carolina, and was a member of the Atlantic Coast Conference.

== Roster ==
Name	Number	Position	Height	Weight	Year	Hometown
Andy Borman	40	G	6–4	190	Senior	Morrisville, North Carolina
Patrick Davidson	41	G	6–1	190	Freshman	Melbourne, Arkansas
Luol Deng	2	F	6–8	220	Freshman	Blairstown, New Jersey
Sean Dockery	15	G	6–2	185	Sophomore	Chicago, Illinois
Chris Duhon	21	G	6–1	185	Senior	Slidell, Louisiana
Daniel Ewing	5	G	6–3	185	Junior	Houston, Texas
Nick Horvath	3	F	6–10	250	Senior	Shoreview, Minnesota
Patrick Johnson	51	C	6–9	250	Junior	Atlanta, Georgia
Lee Melchionni	13	F	6–6	205	Sophomore	Lancaster, Pennsylvania
Joe Pagliuca	45	G	6–2	185	Freshman	Weston, Massachusetts
Shavlik Randolph	42	F	6–10	240	Sophomore	Raleigh, North Carolina
JJ Redick	4	G	6–4	190	Sophomore	Roanoke, Virginia
Michael Thompson	3	C	6–10	250	Sophomore	Joliet, Illinois
Shelden Williams	23	F	6–9	250	Sophomore	Forest Park, Oklahoma

== Schedule and results ==
Date time, TV	Rank^{#}	Opponent^{#}	Result	Record	Site city, state
Regular season
November 22, 2003*	No. 2	Detroit Mercy	W 67–56	1–0	Cameron Indoor Stadium; Durham, North Carolina
November 27, 2003*	No. 2	vs. Pacific; 2003 Great Alaska Shootout	W 82–69	2–0	Sullivan Arena; Anchorage, Alaska
November 28, 2003*	No. 2	vs. Liberty; Great Alaska Shootout	W 76–47	3–0	Sullivan Arena; Anchorage, Alaska
November 29, 2003*	No. 2	vs. Purdue; Great Alaska Shootout	L 68–78	3–1	Sullivan Arena; Anchorage, Alaska
December 3, 2003*	No. 6	at No. 5 Michigan State	W 72–50	4–1	Breslin Center; East Lansing, Michigan
December 6, 2003	No. 6	St. John's	W 79–58	5–1	Cameron Indoor Stadium; Durham, North Carolina
December 14, 2003*	No. 4	Portland	W 84–43	6–1	Cameroon Indoor Stadium; Durham, North Carolina
December 17, 2003*	No. 3	Princeton	W 69–51	7–1	Cameron Indoor Stadium; Durham, North Carolina
December 20, 2003*	No. 3	vs. No. 11 Texas	W 89–61	8–1	Madison Square Garden; New York City, New York
December 29, 2003*	No. 3	Davidson	W 88–54	9–1	Cameron Indoor Stadium; Durham, North Carolina
January 3, 2004	No. 2	at Clemson	W 73–54	10–1 (1–0)	Littlejohn Coliseum; Clemson, South Carolina
January 6, 2004*	No. 2	Fairfield	W 99–58	11–1	Cameron Indoor Stadium; Durham, North Carolina
January 11, 2004	No. 2	at Virginia	W 93–71	12–1 (2–0)	University Hall; Charlottesville, Virginia
January 15, 2004	No. 2	NC State	W 76–57	13–1 (3–0)	Cameron Indoor Stadium; Durham, North Carolina
January 17, 2004; ABC	No. 2	No. 4 Wake Forest	W 84–72	14–1 (4–0)	Cameron Indoor Stadium; Durham, North Carolina
January 21, 2004	No. 1	at Maryland; Rivalry	W 68–60	15–1 (5–0)	Comcast Center; College Park, Maryland
January 24, 2004*; CBS	No. 1	at Georgetown	W 85–66	16–1	Verizon Center; Washington, D.C.
January 29, 2004	No. 1	Florida State	W 56–49	17–1 (6–0)	Cameron Indoor Stadium; Durham, North Carolina
January 31, 2004	No. 1	at No. 14 Georgia Tech	W 82–74	18–1 (7–0)	Alexander Memorial Coliseum; Atlanta, Georgia
February 5, 2004	No. 1	at No. 17 North Carolina; Rivalry	W 83–81 ^{OT}	19–1 (8–0)	Dean Smith Center; Chapel Hill, North Carolina
February 8, 2004	No. 1	Clemson	W 81–55	20–1 (9–0)	Cameron Indoor Stadium; Durham, North Carolina
February 11, 2004	No. 1	Virginia	W 93–75	21–1 (10–0)	Cameron Indoor Stadium; Durham, North Carolina
February 15, 2004	No. 1	at No. 21 NC State	L 74–78	21–2 (10–1)	RBC Center; Raleigh, North Carolina
February 18, 2004; ESPN	No. 3	at No. 15 Wake Forest	L 84–90	21–3 (10–2)	LJVM Coliseum; Winston-Salem, North Carolina
February 22, 2004; CBS	No. 3	Maryland	W 86–63	22–3 (11–2)	Cameron Indoor Stadium; Durham, North Carolina
February 26, 2004*	No. 5	Valparaiso	W 97–63	23–3	Cameron Indoor Stadium; Durham, North Carolina
February 29, 2004	No. 5	at Florida State	W 70–65	24–3 (12–2)	Donald L. Tucker Civic Center; Tallahassee, Florida
March 3, 2004	No. 3	No. 19 Georgia Tech	L 68–76	24–4 (12–3)	Cameron Indoor Stadium; Durham, North Carolina
March 6, 2004	No. 3	No. 14 North Carolina	W 70–65	25–4 (13–3)	Cameron Indoor Stadium; Durham, North Carolina
ACC tournament
March 12, 2004; ESPN	(3) No. 5	vs. (8) Virginia; Quarterfinals	W 84–74	26–4	Greensboro Coliseum; Greensboro, North Carolina
March 13, 2004; ESPN	(3) No. 5	vs. (4) No. 14 Georgia Tech; Semifinals	W 85–71	27–4	Greensboro Coliseum; Greensboro, North Carolina
March 14, 2004; ESPN	(3) No. 5	vs. (6) Maryland; Championship	L 87–95 ^{OT}	27–5	Greensboro Coliseum; Greensboro, North Carolina
NCAA tournament
March 18, 2004*; CBS	(1 A) No. 6	vs. (16 A) Alabama State; First Round	W 96–61	28–5	RBC Center; Raleigh, North Carolina
March 20, 2004*; CBS	(1 A) No. 6	vs. (8 A) Seton Hall; Second Round	W 90–62	29–5	RBC Center; Raleigh, North Carolina
March 26, 2004*; CBS	(1 A) No. 6	vs. (4 A) No. 13 Illinois; Sweet Sixteen	W 72–62	30–5	Georgia Dome; Atlanta, Georgia
March 28, 2004*; CBS	(1 A) No. 6	vs. (7 A) Xavier; Elite Eight	W 66–63	31–5	Georgia Dome; Atlanta, Georgia
April 3, 2004*; CBS	(1 A) No. 6	vs. (2 P) No. 7 Connecticut; Final Four	L 78–79	31–6	Alamodome; San Antonio, Texas
*Non-conference game. ^{#}Rankings from AP Poll, A=Atlanta Regional, P=Phoenix Regional. (#) Tournament seedings in parentheses.

== Team players drafted into the NBA ==
Round	Pick	Player	NBA club
1	7	Luol Deng	Phoenix Suns*
2	38	Chris Duhon	Chicago Bulls

*Immediately traded to the Chicago Bulls through prior agreement
