= California Birth Index =

List of all registered births in California between 1905 and 1995

The California Birth Index (CABI) is a database compiled by the California Office of Health Information and Research. The index contains birth records of all registered births in California between 1905 and 1995. Each record is an abstract of a person's birth certificate, including date of birth, full name (Note: Full name for those born 1925–1955 and 1978–1995. Only middle initial for the rest.), county of birth, gender, and mother's maiden name. The index is available online from a number of sources.

== Data quality ==
California began statewide civil registration of births on July 1, 1905. Earlier birth records, which would not appear in the index, may exist in the county where the birth took place or at the church where a baptism took place. People who have been adopted are sometimes listed by their birth name, sometimes listed by their adopted name, sometimes by both and sometimes not listed at all.

== Controversy ==
The CABI is considered a valuable genealogy tool but is also criticized for privacy issues.

Critics of the index claim that the index's information aids in identity theft. Several public record websites have purchased copies of the index from the California Department of Health Services. In 2001, the San Jose Mercury News printed a story about the index, then accessible on genealogical website Rootsweb, causing numerous complaints and requests for removal from the index, and ultimately leading to the index being removed from the site.

Despite the controversy, birth records in California are public record. Any person can request and receive a copy of the birth certificate of any other person born in California. To reduce the risk of identity theft, only certain persons may obtain an authorized copy of a birth record. All others may obtain an informational copy. The informational copy will have the same information on it as an authorized copy, but will be stamped "INFORMATIONAL, NOT A VALID DOCUMENT TO ESTABLISH IDENTITY."

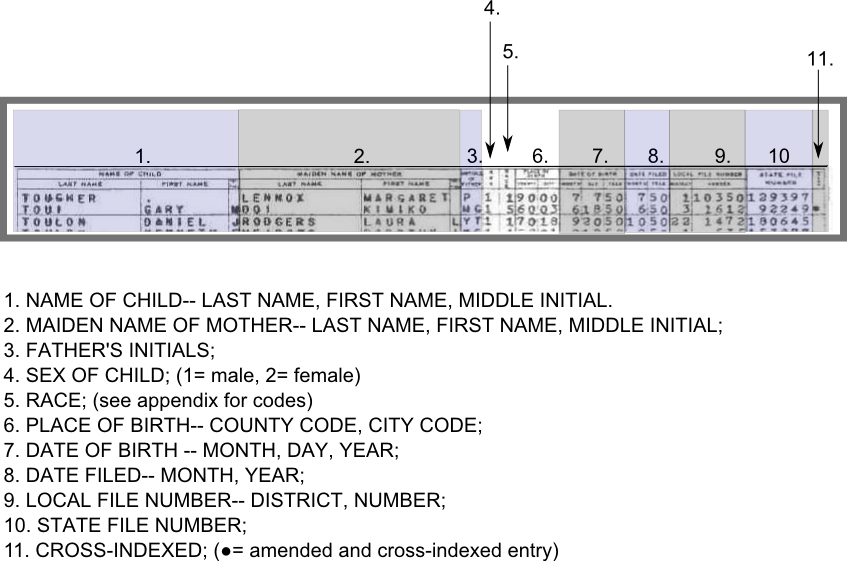
Microfiche CABI – 1950 example

== See also ==
- Social Security Death Index
