= Chris McCray =

American basketball player

Personal information
- Born: May 27, 1984 (age 42) Capitol Heights, Maryland
- Listed height: 6 ft 5 in (1.96 m)
- Listed weight: 192 lb (87 kg)

Career information
- High school: Fairmont Heights (Landover, Maryland)
- College: Maryland (2002–2006)
- NBA draft: 2006: undrafted
- Position: Shooting guard
- Number: 12, 14

Career history
- 2006–2007: Milwaukee Bucks
- 2007: Dakota Wizards
- 2009–2011: Sioux Falls Skyforce
- Stats at NBA.com
- Stats at Basketball Reference

Chris McCray (born May 27, 1984, in Capitol Heights, Maryland) is an American professional basketball player. He formerly played for the Milwaukee Bucks of the NBA.

A 6'5", 205 lb shooting guard, he attended and played basketball collegiately at the University of Maryland but dismissed from the team after he was found academically ineligible. He was not selected in the 2006 NBA draft, but signed a free agent contract with the Milwaukee Bucks in September 2006, making the team's 15-player roster.

In August 2005, McCray was involved in a street fight on campus at the University of Maryland, College Park, and he was jailed for a night for refusing to leave the scene and resisting arrest. Charges of disturbing public peace, resisting arrest, and escaping from custody were later dropped.
