= John Gilchrist (basketball) =

American basketball player (born 1985)

Personal information
- Born: June 29, 1985 (age 41) Norfolk, Virginia, U.S.
- Listed height: 6 ft 3 in (1.91 m)
- Listed weight: 194 lb (88 kg)

Career information
- High school: Salem (Virginia Beach, Virginia)
- College: Maryland (2002–2005)
- NBA draft: 2005: undrafted
- Playing career: 2005–2015
- Position: Point guard

Career history
- 2005: Maccabi Rishon LeZion
- 2006: Ironi Naharia
- 2006: Pau Orthez
- 2007–2008: Ironi Naharia
- 2007: Los Angeles D-Fenders
- 2007: Idaho Stampede
- 2009–2010: Adelaide 36ers
- 2011–2012: Sigal Prishtina
- 2012–2013: SZTE-Szedeák
- 2013–2014: North Dallas Vandals
- 2014–2015: Darkhan Garid

Career highlights
- All-NBL Third Team (2010); Third-team All-ACC (2004); ACC tournament MVP (2004)

John Henry Gilchrist III (born June 29, 1985) is an American former professional basketball player. He is a former Maryland Terrapins point guard.

== College ==
Arriving in College Park for the 2002–03 season, Gilchrist had a freshman campaign as a backup to then-Terp guards Drew Nicholas and Steve Blake. Following Blake's graduation, Gilchrist inherited the starting point guard position as a sophomore, leading the team in assists (5.0 pg), scoring (15.4 pg), minutes (34.0 pg), and steals (1.8 pg), while starting 30 of 32 games. For his efforts, Gilchrist was named the Terps' Co-Player of the Year.

However, Gilchrist's true coming-out party would be the 2004 ACC Tournament. Having slipped to 7–9 in the ACC—the team's first sub-.500 conference record in more than a decade—Maryland was not as highly regarded as in years past and wound up as the tournament's 6th seed. However, the Terps ultimately upset the tournament's top three seeds, knocking off Wake Forest (3), NC State (2), and Duke (1), to win their first ACC Tournament title in 20 years.

During this run, Gilchrist dazzled as the Terps' primary offensive option. First, Gilchrist hit the game-winning free throw against a Chris Paul-led Wake Forest team, scoring 16 points and shooting 4-for-4 from 3-point range. Next, Gilchrist led a 21-point comeback against the NC State Wolfpack, scoring 23 of his 30 points after halftime (and shooting 9-for-9 from the field); the 30-point performance was the first for a Terp since Juan Dixon scored 33 points against the Kansas Jayhawks in the 2002 NCAA Final Four.

But Gilchrist was saving his best for last. In the tournament final against Duke—a team bound for the 2004 Final Four and loaded with six future NBA players—Gilchrist led the Terps back from a 12-point deficit with less than five minutes left in the game. Most dramatically, Gilchrist closed the 2nd half with a driving layup that drew a fifth and final foul on Shelden Williams, Duke's best low-post presence and Gilchrist's main competition for tournament MVP. Gilchrist's ensuing foul shot would tie the game at 77 with 20 seconds left, and Maryland went on to dominate the overtime and secure a 95–87 victory. For his three-day heroics, Gilchrist was unanimously named tournament MVP. The win also snapped Duke's drive for a sixth consecutive ACC Tournament title, while propelling Maryland into the 2004 NCAA tournament; though the Terps ultimately lost by a few points to Syracuse in the second round, the team was seen as an up-and-coming squad that had overachieved, despite its youth.

However, Gilchrist's career at Maryland—and fans' and NBA scouts' glowing opinion of him—would never reach these heights again. Led by their junior point guard, the Terps entered the 2004–2005 season ranked in the top 15 in the nation, but would succumb to road struggles and a late season collapse to again finish 7–9 in the conference. Nor could the team summon 2004's magic in the 2005 ACC Tournament; the Terps lost in the first round to Clemson, the third time the Tigers defeated the Terps that year. With a middling 16–12 record, Maryland missed the NCAA tournament for the first time in 13 years and accepted a consolation trip to the NIT, where they lost in the semifinals to South Carolina.

== Professional ==
Despite having the physical tools (6 ft 3 in 194 lb.) of a solid NBA point guard and skills and athleticism that drew comparisons to an early Stephon Marbury, Gilchrist went undrafted, as most felt his mental maturity lagged far behind his physical maturity. He was invited to play in the Cleveland Cavaliers' summer league, but was not picked up by the team.

=== Maccabi Rishon LeZion, 2005–2006 ===
In October 2005, he signed with the Maccabi Rishon Letzion, an Israeli pro team, he helped in leading his team to the Israeli Final Four where they finished in the 3rd place.

=== Pau-Ortez, Ironi Nahariya and NBDL, 2006–2007 ===
In the summer of 2006 Gilchrist signed with the Euroleague French team Pau Orthez but was released shortly and moved back to Israel, to Ironi Naharia. Gilchrist remained inconsistent during the season, and was again released in January 2007.

Gilchrist was picked up as the 66th pick in the 5th round by the Los Angeles D-Fenders in the NBDL (NBA development league) in February 2007. John Gilchrist played for the D-Fenders through March, then moved to the Idaho Stampede (another NBDL team) in April.

=== Latvia and return to Ironi Nahariya, 2007–2008 ===
In August 2007 Gilchrist signed one-year contract with Latvian runners-up BK Ventspils, but in November 2007 was released. After a few weeks, Gilchrist returned to play for Israel's Ironi Naharya.

=== Adelaide 36ers, 2009–2010 ===
In July 2009 it was reported he would be joining the Adelaide 36ers from the Australian NBL. In his first game, against the Cairns Taipans, Gilchrist scored 20 points and added 10 rebounds and 6 assists. On October 29, 2009, Gilchrist scored an NBL career-high 26 points in a 99–91 loss to the New Zealand Breakers. He suffered a serious knee injury towards the end of the season.

=== B.K. Prishtina, 2011–2012 ===
John Gilchrist bounced back from a knee injury to a strong return to Kosovo playing Sigal Prishtina from the Kosovo Basketball League to make all league honors of Eurobasket.com.

=== Darkhan Garid, 2014–2015 ===
Gilchrist had inked a deal with Darkhan Gaird from Mongolia in 2014.
