= Paul Hewitt =

American basketball coach (born 1963)

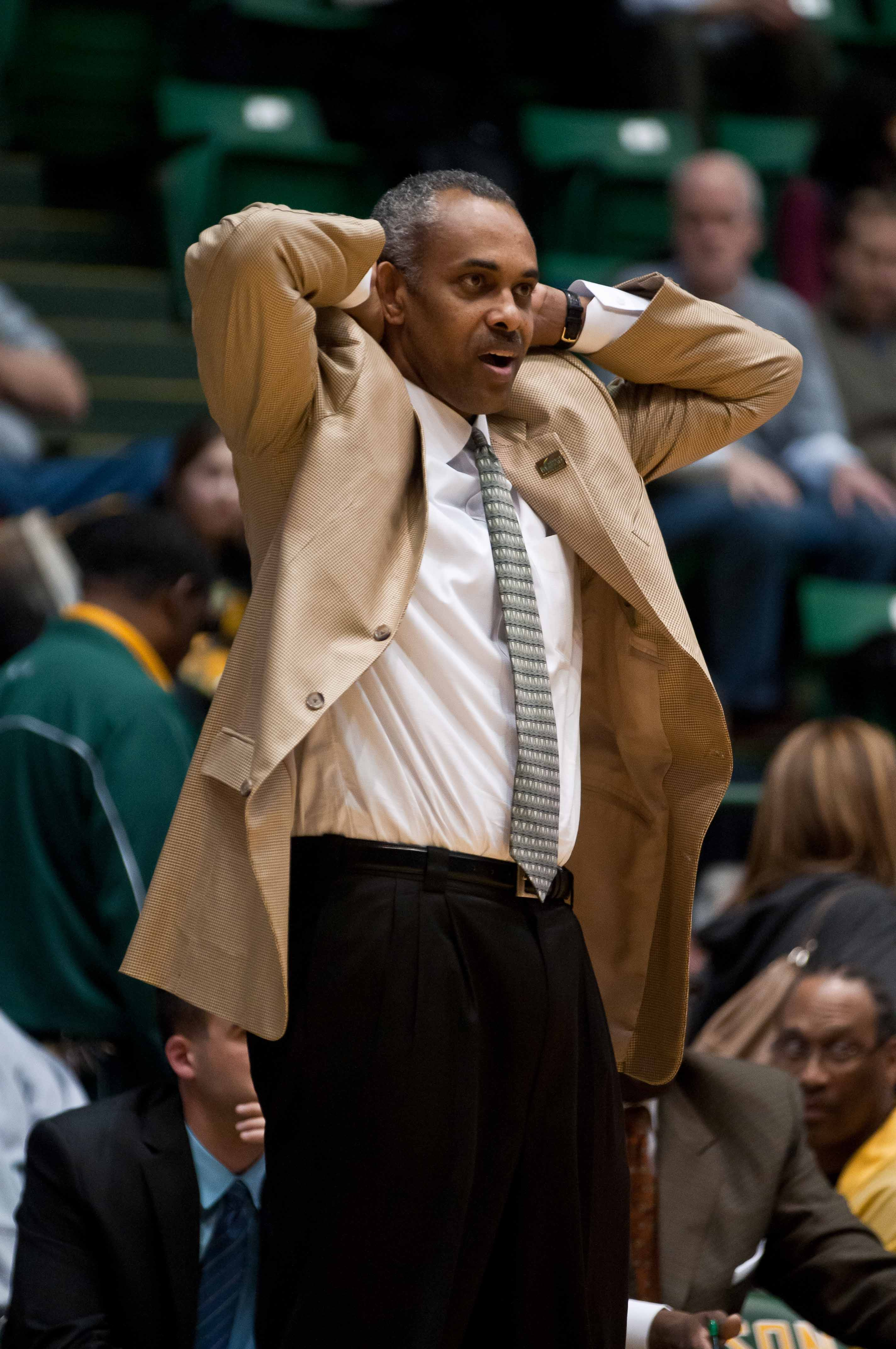
- Hewitt in 2012 at George Mason

San Diego Clippers
- Position: Head coach
- League: NBA G League

Personal information
- Born: May 4, 1963 (age 63) Kingston, Jamaica

Career information
- College: 322–256 (.557)
- Coaching career: 1988–present

Career history

Playing
- 1982–1985: St. John Fisher

Career highlights
- As head coach: NCAA Division I Regional – Final Four (2004); MAAC tournament (1999); 2 MAAC regular season (1999, 2000); MAAC Coach of the Year (2000); ACC Coach of the Year (2001)

Paul Harrington Hewitt (born May 4, 1963) is an American college basketball coach and the former head coach at the Georgia Institute of Technology (Georgia Tech) and George Mason University. He grew up in Westbury, New York. In 2021, he was named the head coach of the San Diego Clippers, the NBA G League affiliate of the Los Angeles Clippers.

== Career ==
=== Siena ===
After playing at St. John Fisher College, Hewitt coached the Siena College men's college basketball team for three years, from 1998 to 2000. Following a three-year stretch in which Siena won just 22 games, he led Siena to their first Metro Atlantic Athletic Conference title game appearance and its first appearance in the NCAA Men's Division I Basketball Championship tournament since 1989.

He posted a 66–27 mark as the head coach at Siena. At the Loudonville, New York, school, Hewitt revived a program that had been dormant since the mid-1990s and molded it into one of the best in the Metro Atlantic Athletic Conference and among the best in the Northeast. In three seasons at Siena, Hewitt developed one of the nation's highest scoring teams. Siena ranked third nationally in scoring each of his last two seasons there, and in three seasons the team averaged 85.6 points per game while shooting 38.1 percent from three-point range and 77.8 percent from the foul line. Hewitt guided the Saints to their first outright conference regular season title in 2000. Siena finished the season with a 24–9 overall mark and a MAAC-best 15–3 slate. He directed the Saints to their third consecutive MAAC Championship game appearance, and second consecutive postseason berth with a bid to the NIT.

=== Georgia Tech ===
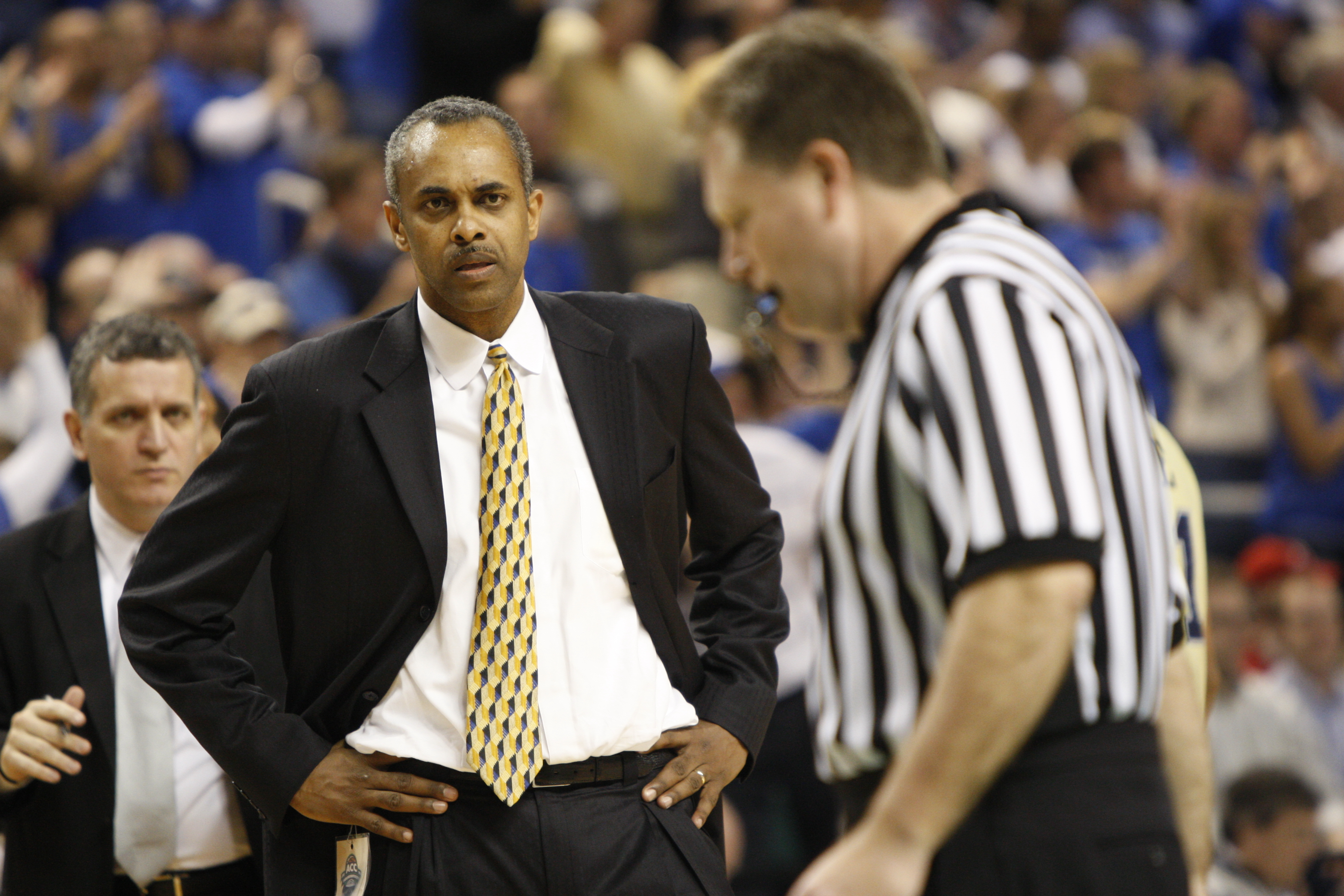
Hewitt at Georgia Tech, during the 2010 ACC tournament.

Hewitt was named the twelfth head coach of the Georgia Tech men's college basketball team on April 6, 2000. He received his highest accolades for guiding the Yellow Jackets to the 2001 NCAA Division I men's basketball tournament in his first season. Hewitt was recognized as the ACC Coach of the Year, only the second time in league history that a first-year coach had won the award. He was also named District 5 Coach of the Year by the National Association of Basketball Coaches (NABC) and was a finalist for the Naismith College Coach of the Year Award.

Three years later, he led the team to one win from the national championship in the 2004 NCAA Division I men's basketball tournament before losing in the championship game against Connecticut. Despite preseason predictions that had Tech finishing no better than seventh in the ACC, the Yellow Jackets started 12–0 and finished 28–10, tying a school record for victories in a season In 2005, he signed a contract extension, giving him a new six-year contract. Tech's success led to Hewitt receiving the Fritz Pollard Coach of the Year award by the Black College Coaches Association. He also was listed at No. 71 among the nation's 101 top minorities in sports by Sports Illustrated. Only 15 figures in college athletics, and only four men's basketball coaches, made that list.

Though Tech dealt with a number of injuries to key players the following season, Hewitt again guided the Yellow Jackets to a strong finish, tying for fourth place in the regular season and advancing to the championship game of the ACC Tournament, a first for the Jackets under Hewitt. Tech earned its third NCAA bid under Hewitt, and fourth post-season bid overall, and won its first-round game before being eliminated by Louisville. He guided Jackets back to the NCAA Tournament in 2007 despite losing the team's top scorer in December.

In 2010, despite a strong reliance on four freshmen in his eight-man rotation, Hewitt guided the Jackets to their fourth NCAA Tournament, winning 23 games overall. Tech won three games in the ACC Tournament and lost a close game to Duke in the finals, and advanced to the second round of the NCAA Midwest Regional.

On March 12, 2011, Paul Hewitt was dismissed as the head coach of the Georgia Tech after eleven seasons with a $7.2 million buyout. He would finish with only one winning ACC season, which led to his eventual dismissal. Under Hewitt, Tech went to the NCAA Tournament five times, played for a national championship, played for two ACC championships, advanced to the postseason NIT quarterfinals and won the preseason NIT. Hewitt compiled a record of 190–162 at Tech. He finished his Tech career third among active coaches in the ACC in games coached and fourth in career victories. He ranks 17th in career victories all-time. Three Tech players were named ACC Rookie of the Year, including Derrick Favors in 2010, Chris Bosh in 2003 and Ed Nelson in 2002. Seven players were named to the league's all-freshman team under Hewitt. Six of his players have earned first- or second-team All-ACC honors, including Iman Shumpert (second team in 2011), Jarrett Jack (second team in 2005), B.J. Elder (second team in 2004), Bosh (second team in 2003), Tony Akins (second team in 2002) and Alvin Jones (first team in 2001).

Several Tech players under Hewitt have gone on to play basketball professionally, including first-round draft picks Derrick Favors, the third overall pick by New Jersey in 2010; Chris Bosh, an NBA lottery choice in 2003 and Basketball Hall of Famer in 2021; Jack, a first-round pick in 2005; Thaddeus Young and Javaris Crittenton, first-round choices in 2007; and Alvin Jones, a second-round choice in 2001. Will Bynum, Luke Schenscher, Anthony Morrow, as well as former walk-on Mario West, have spent time on NBA rosters.

Three of his assistant coaches became head coaches — Dean Keener at James Madison, Cliff Warren at Jacksonville and John O'Connor at Holy Family in Philadelphia — while three players became assistants (Jon Babul at James Madison; Darryl LaBarrie at Campbell, East Carolina and Georgia Tech; and Winston Neal at Jacksonville).

=== Team USA ===
Hewitt has served in USA Basketball on several occasions. In 2006 and 2010, he was an assistant coach with the Under-18 team. Both won gold medals in the Championship of the Americas. He was also the head coach of the U.S. Under-19 squad at the 2011 FIBA Under-19 World Championship. The team came in 5th place.

=== George Mason ===
On April 30, 2011, Hewitt was named the ninth men's basketball head coach at George Mason University in Fairfax, Virginia. He succeeded previous head coach Jim Larranaga after Larranaga accepted a head coaching job at the University of Miami.

In his first year, George Mason returned three senior starters from an NCAA tournament team that had beaten Villanova and was picked to finish second in the conference. Hewitt led the Patriots to a 24–9 record, including a 14–4 mark and 3rd-place finish in CAA play. Senior Ryan Pearson was named the CAA Player of the Year, just the third Patriot to earn the honor.

In his second season as the head men's basketball coach Hewitt guided the Patriots to a 22–16 mark, including a 10–8 conference record. For the second year in a row Hewitt's team did not receive an NCAA or NIT invitation, but played instead in the College Basketball Invitation where it finished as runner-up losing in the championship game to Santa Clara. Junior guard Sherrod Wright was named to the All-State and All-CAA second teams.

In his third season, George Mason moved to the basketball-centric Atlantic-10 conference. Hewitt led his team to an 11–20 mark (4–12 in Atlantic 10). No Patriot players were named to the all conference team.

In his fourth season at George Mason, the Patriots were 9–22 record (4–14 in Atlantic 10). After being eliminated from the Atlantic 10 tournament in the first round for the second year in a row, Hewitt was fired on March 16, 2015. Since his firing at George Mason, Hewitt has remained active in the coaching and broadcasting profession. He served as vice president of the NABC board of directors. In September 2016, It was announced that Hewitt had joined the staff of the Los Angeles Clippers as a scout.

== Head coaching record ==
Record table
Season	Team	Overall	Conference	Standing	Postseason
Siena Saints (Metro Atlantic Athletic Conference) (1997–2000)
1997–98	Siena	17–12	10–8	T–3rd	
1998–99	Siena	25–6	13–5	T–1st	NCAA Division I first round
1999–00	Siena	24–9	15–3	1st	NIT second round
Siena:		66–27 (.710)	38–16 (.704)		
Georgia Tech Yellow Jackets (Atlantic Coast Conference) (2000–2011)
2000–01	Georgia Tech	17–13	8–8	T–5th	NCAA Division I first round
2001–02	Georgia Tech	15–16	7–9	T–5th	
2002–03	Georgia Tech	16–15	7–9	5th	NIT quarterfinal
2003–04	Georgia Tech	28–10	9–7	T–3rd	NCAA Division I Runner-up
2004–05	Georgia Tech	20–12	8–8	T–4th	NCAA Division I second round
2005–06	Georgia Tech	11–17	4–12	T–10th	
2006–07	Georgia Tech	20–12	8–8	T–6th	NCAA Division I first round
2007–08	Georgia Tech	15–17	7–9	T–7th	
2008–09	Georgia Tech	12–19	2–14	12th	
2009–10	Georgia Tech	23–13	7–9	7th	NCAA Division I second round
2010–11	Georgia Tech	13–18	5–11	T–10th	
Georgia Tech:		190–162 (.542)	72–104 (.409)		
George Mason Patriots (Colonial Athletic Association) (2011–2013)
2011–12	George Mason	24–9	14–4	3rd	
2012–13	George Mason	22–16	10–8	5th	CBI Runner-up
George Mason Patriots (Atlantic 10 Conference) (2013–2015)
2013–14	George Mason	11–20	4–12	11th	
2014–15	George Mason	9–22	4–14	13th	
George Mason:		66–67 (.496)	32–38 (.457)		
Total:		322–256 (.557)			
National champion Postseason invitational champion Conference regular season champion Conference regular season and conference tournament champion Division regular season champion Division regular season and conference tournament champion Conference tournament champion

== See also ==
- List of NCAA Division I Men's Final Four appearances by coach
