= 2004 ACC men's basketball tournament =

- 2004 ACC Tournament logo
- Classification: Division I
- Season: 2003–04
- Teams: 9
- Site: Greensboro Coliseum; Greensboro, North Carolina
- Champions: Maryland (3rd title)
- Winning coach: Gary Williams (1st title)
- MVP: John Gilchrist (Maryland)

The 2004 Atlantic Coast Conference men's basketball tournament took place from March 11 to 14 in Greensboro, North Carolina, at the Greensboro Coliseum. The Maryland Terrapins won the tournament as the #6 seed, upsetting #3 seed Wake Forest, #2 seed NC State, and top seed Duke in succession on their way to the championship. It was Maryland's third tournament title, and their first since 1984. Maryland's John Gilchrist won the Most Valuable Player award. Maryland's championship ended Duke's streak of five straight ACC championships.

The 2004 ACC Tournament was the final event with nine participating teams. Virginia Tech and University of Miami from the Big East Conference joined the ACC for the 2004–2005 season.

2003–04 ACC men's basketball standings
	Conf.				Overall
Team	W		L	PCT	W		L	PCT
No. 6 Duke	13	–	3	.813	31	–	6	.838
No. 15 NC State	11	–	5	.688	21	–	10	.677
No. 17 Wake Forest	9	–	7	.563	21	–	10	.677
No. 14 Georgia Tech	9	–	7	.563	28	–	10	.737
No. 18 North Carolina	8	–	8	.500	19	–	11	.633
No. 19 Maryland†	7	–	9	.438	20	–	12	.625
Florida State	6	–	10	.375	19	–	14	.576
Virginia	6	–	10	.375	18	–	13	.581
Clemson	3	–	13	.188	10	–	18	.357
† 2004 ACC tournament winner Rankings from AP Poll

== Bracket ==
First round March 11, 2004
8	Virginia	83^{OT}
9	Clemson	79

Quarterfinals; March 12, 2004
1	#5 Duke	84
8	Virginia	74
4	#14 Georgia Tech	83
5	#16 North Carolina	82
2	#17 NC State	78
7	Florida State	71
3	#15 Wake Forest	86
6	Maryland	87

Semifinals; March 13, 2004
1	#5 Duke	85
4	#14 Georgia Tech	71
2	#17 NC State	82
6	Maryland	85

Championship Game; March 14, 2004
1	#5 Duke	87
6	Maryland	95^{OT}

AP Rankings at time of tournament
