= Illinois State Redbirds men's basketball statistical leaders =

The Illinois State Redbirds men's basketball statistical leaders are individual statistical leaders of the Illinois State Redbirds men's basketball program in various categories, including points, rebounds, assists, steals, and blocks. Within those areas, the lists identify single-game, single-season, and career leaders. The Redbirds represent Illinois State University in the NCAA's Missouri Valley Conference.

Illinois State began competing in intercollegiate basketball in 1898. However, the school's record book does not generally list records from before the 1950s, as records from before this period are often incomplete and inconsistent. Since scoring was much lower in this era, and teams played much fewer games during a typical season, it is likely that few or no players from this era would appear on these lists anyway.

The NCAA did not officially record assists as a stat until the 1983–84 season, and blocks and steals until the 1985–86 season, but Illinois State's record books includes players in these stats before these seasons. These lists are updated through the end of the 2020–21 season.

== Scoring ==
Career
Rank	Player	Points	Seasons
1	Doug Collins	2,240	1970–71 1971–72 1972–73
2	Billy Lewis	1,962	1974–75 1975–76 1976–77 1977–78
3	Fred Marberry	1,881	1953–54 1954–55 1955–56 1956–57
4	Ron Jones	1,839	1976–77 1977–78 1978–79 1979–80
5	Osiris Eldridge	1,838	2006–07 2007–08 2008–09 2009–10
6	Bill Sarver	1,798	1950–51 1951–52 1952–53 1953–54
7	Tarise Bryson	1,736	1998–99 1999–00 2000–01 2001–02
8	Jackie Carmichael	1,580	2009–10 2010–11 2011–12 2012–13
9	Jerry McGreal	1,542	1964–65 1965–66 1966–67 1967–68
10	George Terry	1,470	1965–66 1966–67 1967–68

Season
Rank	Player	Points	Season
1	Doug Collins	847	1971–72
2	Doug Collins	743	1970–71
3	Tarise Bryson	685	2000–01
4	Antonio Reeves	662	2021–22
5	Doug Collins	650	1972–73
6	Fred Marberry	645	1955–56
7	Jeff Wilkins	631	1976–77
8	George Terry	609	1967–68
9	Billy Lewis	598	1977–78
10	Derrick Mayes	595	1978–79

Single game
Rank	Player	Points	Season	Opponent
1	Robert Hawkins	58	1973–74	Northern Illinois
2	Doug Collins	57	1972–73	New Orleans
3	Doug Collins	55	1970–71	Ball State
4	Rick Whitlow	51	1974–75	Southern Illinois
	Al Meyer	51	1955–56	McKendree
6	Doug Collins	45	1971–72	Winona State
7	Doug Collins	44	1970–71	Missouri State
8	Fred Marberry	43	1956–57	Tennessee St.
	Fred Young	43	1909–10	Eureka
10	Doug Collins	42	1971–72	DePauw
	Doug Collins	42	1971–72	Pacific

== Rebounds ==
Career
Rank	Player	Rebounds	Seasons
1	Ron deVries	1,033	1971–72 1972–73 1973–74
2	Dave Schertz	978	1955–56 1956–57 1957–58 1958–59
3	Jackie Carmichael	942	2009–10 2010–11 2011–12 2012–13
4	Fred Marberry	933	1953–54 1954–55 1955–56 1956–57
5	Steve Arends	885	1965–66 1966–67 1967–68
6	Billy Lewis	869	1974–75 1975–76 1976–77 1977–78
7	Rick Lamb	809	1979–80 1980–81 1981–82 1982–83
8	Jeff Wilkins	794	1974–75 1975–76 1976–77
9	Dinma Odiakosa	772	2005–06 2007–08 2008–09 2009–10
10	Del Yarbrough	750	1976–77 1977–78 1978–79 1979–80

Season
Rank	Player	Rebounds	Season
1	Ron deVries	373	1973–74
2	Ron deVries	369	1972–73
3	Steve Arends	344	1966–67
4	Jackie Carmichael	338	2011–12
5	Fred Marberry	331	1955–56
6	Jeff Wilkins	323	1976–77
7	Tony Cadle	315	1956–57
8	Steve Arends	313	1967–68
9	Ed Koch	308	1958–59
10	Fred Marberry	307	1954–55

Single game
Rank	Player	Rebounds	Season	Opponent
1	Ron deVries	24	1973–74	Pacific
	Mike Akin	24	1964–65	Sioux Falls
	Wardell Vaughn	24	1962–63	Eastern Illinois
	John Swart	24	1959–60	Eastern Illinois
5	Ron deVries	23	1973–74	Northern Ill.
	Tom Taulbee	23	1968–69	Illinois Wesleyan
7	Ron deVries	22	1972–73	Southern Illinois
	Ron deVries	22	1971–72	Southern Illinois
	Stepney Bacon	22	1971–72	Western Illinois
10	Ron deVries	21	1972–73	Winona State
	Ron deVries	21	1972–73	Indiana State

== Assists ==
Career
Rank	Player	Assists	Seasons
1	Jamar Smiley	740	1994–95 1995–96 1996–97 1997–98
2	Ron Jones	597	1976–77 1977–78 1978–79 1979–80
3	Derrick Mayes	506	1975–76 1976–77 1977–78 1978–79
4	Paris Lee	495	2013–14 2014–15 2015–16 2016–17
5	Mike Bonczyk	482	1972–73 1973–74 1974–75 1975–76
6	Michael McKenny	467	1981–82 1982–83 1983–84 1984–85
7	Vince Greene	416	2001–02 2002–03 2003–04 2004–05
8	Randy Blair	384	1986–87 1987–88 1988–89 1989–90
9	Richard Thomas	376	1989–90 1990–91 1991–92 1992–93
10	Todd Wemhoener	371	1990–91 1991–92 1992–93 1993–94

Season
Rank	Player	Assists	Season
1	Todd Starks	243	1986–87
2	Jamar Smiley	229	1995–96
3	David Cason	226	1994–95
4	Jamar Smiley	219	1996–97
5	Ron Jones	212	1976–77
6	Mike Bonczyk	188	1975–76
7	Jamar Smiley	186	1997–98
8	Mike Bonczyk	179	1974–75
9	Paris Lee	176	2016–17
10	Rick Ferina	165	1978–79

Single game
Rank	Player	Assists	Season	Opponent
1	Mike Bonczyk	23	1974–75	Northern Illinois
2	Mike Bonczyk	20	1973–74	Northern Illinois
	Mike Bonczyk	20	1972–73	UNI
4	David Cason	16	1994–95	Southern Illinois
5	Jamar Smiley	14	1997–98	Pittsburgh
	Jamar Smiley	14	1996–97	Indiana State
	Jamar Smiley	14	1995–96	Drake
	Jamar Smiley	14	1995–96	UNI
	Todd Starks	14	1986–87	Bradley
	Ron Jones	14	1976–77	Butler

== Steals ==
Career
Rank	Player	Steals	Seasons
1	Paris Lee	248	2013–14 2014–15 2015–16 2016–17
2	Ron Jones	222	1976–77 1977–78 1978–79 1979–80
3	Osiris Eldridge	181	2006–07 2007–08 2008–09 2009–10
4	Richard Thomas	174	1989–90 1990–91 1991–92 1992–93
5	Todd Wemhoener	163	1990–91 1991–92 1992–93 1993–94
6	Jamar Smiley	142	1994–95 1995–96 1996–97 1997–98
7	Vince Greene	139	2001–02 2002–03 2003–04 2004–05
8	Michael McKenny	138	1981–82 1982–83 1983–84 1984–85
9	Tarise Bryson	129	1998–99 1999–00 2000–01 2001–02
	Rickie Johnson	129	1981–82 1982–83 1983–84 1984–85

Season
Rank	Player	Steals	Season
1	Paris Lee	82	2014–15
2	Paris Lee	65	2016–17
3	Dalton Banks	63	2024–25
4	Todd Starks	61	1986–87
5	Lloyd Phillips	60	2009–10
6	Ron Jones	59	1979–80
7	Ron Jones	57	1976–77
8	Tarise Bryson	56	2000–01
9	Boo Richardson	55	2007–08
10	Paris Lee	54	2015–16
	Ron Jones	54	1977–78

Single game
Rank	Player	Steals	Season	Opponent
1	Vince Greene	7	2002–03	Evansville
	Victor Williams	7	1998–99	Oakland
	Ron Jones	7	1979–80	Howard
	Robert Hawkins	7	1973–74	Louisville

== Blocks ==
Career
Rank	Player	Blocks	Seasons
1	Jackie Carmichael	200	2009–10 2010–11 2011–12 2012–13
2	Reggie Lynch	189	2013–14 2014–15
3	Greg Dilligard	160	2003–04 2004–05 2005–06 2006–07
4	LeRoy Watkins	143	1995–96 1996–97 1997–98 1998–99
5	Mike VandeGarde	134	1990–91 1991–92 1992–93 1993–94
6	Joe Galvin	132	1976–77 1977–78 1978–79 1979–80
7	Jon Ekey	110	2010–11 2011–12 2012–13
8	Jeff Wilkins	103	1974–75 1975–76 1976–77
9	Bill Braksick	88	1983–84 1984–85 1985–86
10	Daouda N’Diaye	81	2015–16 2016–17 2017–18

Season
Rank	Player	Blocks	Season
1	Jeff Wilkins	103	1976–77
2	Reggie Lynch	96	2013–14
3	Reggie Lynch	93	2014–15
4	Jackie Carmichael	68	2012–13
5	Greg Dilligard	62	2005–06
6	Jon Ekey	52	2010–11
7	Jackie Carmichael	50	2011–12
8	LeRoy Watkins	49	1998–99
9	Joe Galvin	48	1977–78
10	Anthony Slack	47	2007–08

Single game
Rank	Player	Blocks	Season	Opponent
1	Joe Galvin	9	1978–79	Evansville
2	LeRoy Watkins	8	1996–97	Evansville
	Jeff Wilkins	8	1975–76	UNI
4	Reggie Lynch	7	2014–15	Youngstown St.
	Greg Dilligard	7	2004–05	Loyola Chicago
