= 1970–71 Illinois State Redbirds men's basketball team =

American college basketball season

1970–71 Illinois State Redbirds men's basketball
- Conference: Conference of Midwestern Universities
- Record: 16–10 (3–5 CMU)
- Head coach: Will Robinson (1st season)
- Assistant coaches: Warren Crews; Bob Ortegel; John Parker
- Home arena: Horton Field House

The 1970–71 Illinois State Redbirds men's basketball team represented Illinois State University during the 1970–71 NCAA University Division men's basketball season. The Redbirds, led by first-year head coach Will Robinsion, played their home games at Horton Field House in Normal, Illinois as members of the Conference of Midwestern Universities. They finished the season 16–10, 3–5 in conference play to finish in fourth place.

== Roster ==
1970–71 Illinois State Redbirds men's basketball team
Players
Coaches

Pos.	#	Name	Height	Weight	Year	Hometown
C	53	Dale Janssen	6 ft 6 in (1.98 m)	—	Sr	Hartsburg, IL
	25	Ken Davis	6 ft 5 in (1.96 m)	—	Jr	Chicago, IL
G	43	Greg Guy	6 ft 3 in (1.91 m)	—	Jr	Lincoln, IL
F	45	Myron Litwiller	6 ft 5 in (1.96 m)	—	Jr	Armington, IL
	51	Dennis Murray	6 ft 5 in (1.96 m)	—	Jr	Detroit, MI
	24	Frank Reed	—	—	Jr
F	30	Jim Smith	6 ft 5 in (1.96 m)	—	Jr	Mount Vernon, IL
	55	Carlos Thomas	6 ft 5 in (1.96 m)	—	Jr	Chicago, IL
G	20	Doug Collins	6 ft 5 in (1.96 m)	—	So	Benton, IL
	41	Fred Points	6 ft 3 in (1.91 m)	—	So	Columbus, OH
	15	Tom Prombo	6 ft 2 in (1.88 m)	—	So	Chicago Heights, IL
G	13	Dan Witt	5 ft 11 in (1.8 m)	—	So	Maple Park, IL

Head coach

- Will Robinson (West Virginia State)

Assistant coach(es)

- Warren Crews (Southeast Missouri State)
- Bob Ortegel (Bradley)
- John Parker (Detroit Mercy)

Legend

- (C) Team captain
- (S) Suspended
- (I) Ineligible
- (W) Walk-on
- Injured
- Current redshirt

Roster
Last update: January 15, 2021

== Schedule ==
Date time, TV	Rank^{#}	Opponent^{#}	Result	Record	High points	High rebounds	High assists	Site (attendance) city, state
Regular season
December 1, 1970*; 8:00 pm		Bemidji State	W 80–67	1–0	17 – Litwiller	12 – Murray	–	Horton Field House; Normal, IL
December 4, 1970*		vs. Central Michigan; Western Illinois Tournament [Semifinal]	L 73–77	1–1	32 – Collins	12 – Murray	–	Western Hall; Macomb, IL
December 5, 1970*		at Western Illinois; Western Illinois Tournament [Third Place]	W 89–69	2–1	25 – Guy	12 – Litwiller	–	Western Hall; Macomb, IL
December 9, 1970; 8:00 pm		Ball State	W 90–80	3–1 (1–0)	31 – Collins	11 – Litwiller	–	Horton Field House; Normal, IL
December 12, 1970; 8:00 pm		at Northern Illinois	W 89–88	4–1 (2–0)	27 – Collins	11 – Smith	–	Chick Evans Field House (4,100); DeKalb, IL
December 17, 1970*; 8:00 pm		Northeast Missouri State	L 66–69	4–2	24 – Collins	12 – Litwiller	–	Horton Field House; Normal, IL
December 19, 1970*		at Southeast Missouri State	W 115–111 ^{OT}	5–2	39 – Collins	14 – Murray	–	Houck Field House; Cape Girardeau, MO
December 22, 1970		at Indiana State	L 84–105	5–3 (2–1)	19 – Guy	7 – Murray, Smith	–	Indiana State College Arena; Terre Haute, IN
January 2, 1971*		at Ohio	L 73–97	5–4	30 – Collins	5 – Litwiller, Murray, Collins	–	Convocation Center; Athens, OH
January 6, 1971*; 8:00 pm		Central Michigan	L 63–75	5–5	19 – Collins	9 – Smith	–	Horton Field House; Normal, IL
January 9, 1971*; 8:00 pm		Eastern Illinois	W 80–65	6–5	23 – Collins	8 – Collins	–	Horton Field House; Normal, IL
January 13, 1971; 8:00 pm		Indiana State	L 88–89	6–6 (2–2)	40 – Collins	11 – Smith	–	Horton Field House; Normal, IL
January 16, 1971*		at Wisconsin State–Whitewater	W 86–70	7–6	27 – Collins	7 – Smith, Collins	–	Williams Center Gymnasium; Whitewater, WI
January 18, 1971*; 8:00 pm		Central Missouri State	W 102–63	8–6	31 – Collins	11 – Murray	–	Horton Field House; Normal, IL
January 30, 1971		at Ball State	L 81–99	8–7 (2–3)	37 – Collins	9 – Litwiller	–	Irving Gymnasium; Muncie, IN
February 6, 1971*		at Wisconsin State–Stout	W 82–76	9–7	35 – Collins	8 – Smith	–	Johnson Fieldhouse; Menomonie, WI
February 10, 1971*; 8:00 pm		Western Illinois	W 87–69	10–7	33 – Collins	17 – Smith	–	Horton Field House; Normal, IL
February 13, 1971*		at Eastern Illinois	W 85–76	11–7	26 – Guy	9 – Smith, Collins	–	Lantz Arena; Charleston, IL
February 15, 1971		at Southern Illinois	L 81–97	11–8 (2–4)	26 – Smith	11 – Smith	–	SIU Arena; Carbondale, IL
February 18, 1971; 8:00 pm		Northern Illinois	L 77–83 ^{OT}	11–9 (2–5)	21 – Collins	14 – Litwiller	–	Horton Field House (7,000); Normal, IL
February 20, 1971*		at Central Michigan	L 90–98	11–10	29 – Collins	10 – Litwiller, Murray	–	Ronald W Finch Fieldhouse; Mount Pleasant, MI
February 24, 1971*; 8:00 pm		Akron	W 99–88	12–10	35 – Collins	12 – Murray, Smith	–	Horton Field House; Normal, IL
February 27, 1971*		at Central Missouri State	W 76–74	13–10	19 – Litwiller, Collins	12 – Murray	–	Garrison Gym; Warrensburg, MO
March 1, 1971; 8:00 pm		Southern Illinois	W 87–79	14–10 (3–5)	34 – Collins	14 – Murray	–	Horton Field House; Normal, IL
March 3, 1971*		at Western Illinois	W 84–68	15–10	31 – Collins	17 – Smith	–	Western Hall; Macomb, IL
March 6, 1971*		at Southwest Missouri State	W 89–88 ^{OT}	16–10	44 – Collins	10 – Murray	–	McDonald Arena; Springfield, MO
*Non-conference game. ^{#}Rankings from AP Poll. (#) Tournament seedings in parentheses. All times are in Central Standard Time.
