= 1998 Missouri Valley Conference men's basketball tournament =

- Classification: Division I
- Season: 1997–98
- Teams: 10
- Site: Kiel Center; St. Louis, Missouri
- Champions: Illinois State (4th title)
- Winning coach: Kevin Stallings (2nd title)
- MVP: Dan Muller (Illinois State)

1997–98 Missouri Valley Conference men's basketball standings
	Conf.				Overall
Team	W		L	PCT	W		L	PCT
Illinois State †	16	–	2	.889	25	–	6	.806
Creighton	12	–	6	.667	18	–	10	.643
Southwest Missouri State	11	–	7	.611	16	–	16	.500
Wichita State	11	–	7	.611	16	–	15	.516
Indiana State	10	–	8	.556	16	–	11	.593
Evansville	9	–	9	.500	15	–	15	.500
Bradley	9	–	9	.500	15	–	14	.517
Southern Illinois	8	–	10	.444	14	–	18	.438
Northern Iowa	4	–	14	.222	10	–	17	.370
Drake	0	–	18	.000	3	–	24	.111
† 1998 MVC tournament winner Rankings from AP Poll

The 1998 Missouri Valley Conference men's basketball tournament was played after the conclusion of the 1997–1998 regular season at the Kiel Center in St. Louis, Missouri.

The Illinois State Redbirds defeated the Southwest Missouri State Bears in the championship game, 84–74, and as a result won their 4th MVC Tournament title and earned an automatic bid to the 1998 NCAA tournament. Dan Muller of Illinois State was named the tournament MVP.

== Tournament Bracket ==
Opening Round; February 27, 1998
8	Southern Illinois	91
9	Northern Iowa	72
7	Bradley	69
10	Drake	62

Quarterfinals; February 28, 1998
1	Illinois State	83
8	Southern Illinois	73
4	Wichita State	65
5	Indiana State	55
2	Creighton	68
7	Bradley	76
3	Southwest Missouri State	60
6	Evansville	59

Semifinals; March 1, 1998
1	Illinois State	75
4	Wichita State	54
7	Bradley	58
3	Southwest Missouri State	67

Final; March 2, 1998
1	Illinois State	84
3	Southwest Missouri State	74

== See also ==
- Missouri Valley Conference
