= 1980 Galleon Shippers season =

- Head coach: Nic Jorge

Open Conference results
- Record: 10–8 (55.6%)
- Place: 5th
- Playoff finish: N/A

Invitational Championship results
- Record: 0–0
- Place: N/A
- Playoff finish: N/A

All-Filipino Conference results
- Record: 6–6 (50%)
- Place: N/A
- Playoff finish: N/A

Galleon Shippers seasons

The 1980 Galleon Shippers season was the 1st season of the franchise in the Philippine Basketball Association (PBA).

== New team ==
Galleon Shipping Corporation, a company owned by Rodolfo Cuenca, acquired the franchise of the disbanded Filmanbank. The franchise debuted in the 1980 PBA season as the Galleon Shippers. The core team was built around former Filmanbank players that included skipper Rudolf Kutch, Larry Mumar, Romulo Palijo, Nilo Cruz, Angelito Ladores and Ben Ocariza. It acquired two former U-Tex Wranglers; Anthony Dasalla and Renato Lobo, and a recruit from the amateur ranks, Robinson Obrique. The team was coached by Nic Jorge with assistant Adriano "Bong" Go, a former national youth team trainer.

Galleon's two reinforcements in the Open Conference were Paul McCracken and 6-10 Larry Jackson. After five games, Jackson was replaced by 7-foot center Jeff Wilkins.

== Win–loss record vs opponents ==
Teams	Win	Loss	1st (Open)	3rd (All-Filipino)
Gilbey’s Gin	1	2	1-1	0-1
Great Taste / Presto	3	1	1-1	2-0
Honda	3	1	2-0	1-1
Royal / San Miguel	3	0	2-0	1-0
Tanduay	1	2	1-1	0-1
Tefilin	2	2	1-1	1-1
Toyota Tamaraws	1	2	1-1	0-1
U-Tex Wranglers	2	1	1-1	1-0
Walk Tall / Crispa	0	3	0-2	0-1
Total	16	14	10-8	6-6

== Roster ==
Galleon Shippers roster
Players
Coaches

Pos.	No.	Nat.	Name	Ht.	Wt.
G	7	(Philippines)	Lawrence Mumar	5 ft 11 in (1.80 m)		UST
G/F	8	(Philippines)	Angelito Ladores	5 ft 11 in (1.80 m)		José Rizal
F	9	(Philippines)	Anthony Dasalla	6 ft 3 in (1.91 m)		Far Eastern
F	10	(Philippines)	Renato Lobo	6 ft 2 in (1.88 m)		Far Eastern
F	11	(United States)	Paul McCracken (I)	6 ft 4 in (1.93 m)		Cal State Northridge
F	13	(Philippines)	Rudolf Kutch	6 ft 2 in (1.88 m)		UE
F	16	(Philippines)	Romulo Palijo	6 ft 0 in (1.83 m)		PSBA
G	17	(Philippines)	Joseph Herrera	6 ft 0 in (1.83 m)		Letran
F	19	(Philippines)	Gary Vargas	6 ft 2 in (1.88 m)		PSBA
F	27	(Philippines)	Nilo Cruz	6 ft 2 in (1.88 m)
C	45	(United States)	Jeff Wilkins (I)	7 ft 0 in (2.13 m)		Illinois State
G	14	(Philippines)	Robinson Obrique	5 ft 11 in (1.80 m)		PSBA
G	12	(Philippines)	Ben Ocariza	5 ft 9 in (1.75 m)		Cebu
F	18	(Philippines)	Edmundo Tierra	6 ft 1 in (1.85 m)		UE
C	33	(United States)	Larry Jackson (I)	6 ft 10 in (2.08 m)		Washington

Head coach

- (Philippines) Nic Jorge

Assistant coach(es)

- (Philippines) Bong Go

Legend

- (C) Team captain
- (I) Import
- Injured
