= 2001–02 Creighton Bluejays men's basketball team =

American college basketball season

2001–02 Creighton Bluejays men's basketball
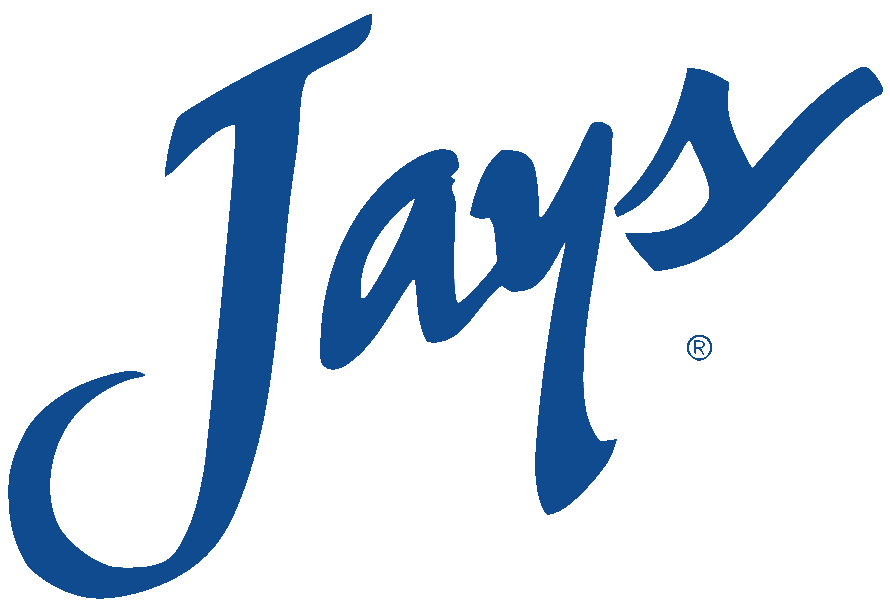

MVC regular season co-champions MVC tournament champions

NCAA Tournament, second round
- Conference: Missouri Valley Conference
- Record: 23–9 (14–4 MVC)
- Head coach: Dana Altman (8th year)
- Assistant coaches: Greg Grensing (8th year); Len Gordy (8th year); Darian DeVries (4th year)
- Home arena: Omaha Civic Auditorium

2001–02 Missouri Valley Conference men's basketball standings
| | Conf. | | | | Overall |
| Team | W | | L | PCT | W | | L | PCT |
|---|---|---|---|---|---|---|---|---|
| Southern Illinois | 14 | – | 4 | .778 | 28 | – | 8 | .778 |
| Creighton † | 14 | – | 4 | .778 | 23 | – | 9 | .719 |
| Illinois State | 12 | – | 6 | .667 | 17 | – | 14 | .548 |
| Southwest Missouri State | 11 | – | 7 | .611 | 17 | – | 15 | .531 |
| Wichita State | 9 | – | 9 | .500 | 15 | – | 15 | .500 |
| Drake | 9 | – | 9 | .500 | 14 | – | 15 | .483 |
| Northern Iowa | 8 | – | 10 | .444 | 14 | – | 15 | .483 |
| Bradley | 5 | – | 13 | .278 | 9 | – | 20 | .310 |
| Indiana State | 4 | – | 14 | .222 | 6 | – | 22 | .214 |
| Evansville | 4 | – | 14 | .222 | 7 | – | 21 | .250 |
† 2002 MVC tournament winner Rankings from AP Poll

The 2001–02 Creighton Bluejays men's basketball team represented Creighton University during the 2001–02 NCAA Division I men's basketball season. The Bluejays, led by head coach Dana Altman, played their home games at the Omaha Civic Auditorium. The Jays finished with a 23–9 record, and tied for the Missouri Valley Conference regular season championship with Southern Illinois. Creighton won the conference tournament to earn a bid to the 2002 NCAA tournament. The team featured Missouri Valley Player of the Year Kyle Korver.

== Roster ==
| Number | Name | Position | Height | Weight | Year | Hometown |
|---|---|---|---|---|---|---|
| 3 | DeAnthony Bowden | Guard | 6-1 | 180 | Junior | Hammond, Indiana |
| 12 | Ismael Caro | Guard | 6-0 | 185 | Sophomore | Manchester, Connecticut |
| 13 | TJ Freeman | Guard | 6-3 | 190 | Freshman | Duluth, Minnesota |
| 20 | Larry House | Guard/Forward | 6–4 | 205 | Junior | Milwaukee, Wisconsin |
| 21 | Joe Dabbert | Center | 6-11 | 255 | Sophomore | Bailey, Colorado |
| 22 | Michael Lindeman | Forward | 6-6 | 200 | Sophomore | Iowa Falls, Iowa |
| 23 | Terrell Taylor | Guard | 6-3 | 200 | Junior | Bridgeport, Connecticut |
| 24 | Tyler McKinney | Guard | 6-1 | 185 | Freshman | Urbandale, Iowa |
| 25 | Kyle Korver | Forward | 6-7 | 210 | Junior | Pella, Iowa |
| 30 | Jimmy Motz | Forward | 6-7 | 225 | Freshman | Lincoln, Nebraska |
| 31 | Dan Bresnahan | Forward | 6-8 | 205 | Freshman | Rochester, Minnesota |
| 34 | Mike Grimes | Forward | 6-7 | 225 | Sophomore | Florissant, Missouri |
| 43 | Brody Deren | Forward | 6-8 | 250 | Sophomore | Harlan, Iowa |
| 44 | Austin Collier | Forward | 6-7 | 205 | Junior | Tucson, Arizona |

== Schedule ==
| Date time, TV | Rank^{#} | Opponent^{#} | Result | Record | Site (attendance) city, state |
Regular season
| 11/18/2001 | | North Carolina A&T | W 72–51 | 1–0 | Omaha Civic Auditorium (-); Omaha, Nebraska |
| 11/27/2001 | | No. 17 Western Kentucky | W 94–91 ^{2OT} | 2–0 | Omaha Civic Auditorium (-); Omaha, Nebraska |
| 11/29/2001 | | Grambling State | W 102–64 | 3–0 | Omaha Civic Auditorium (-); Omaha, Nebraska |
| 12/04/2001 | | at TCU | L 77–82 | 3–1 | Daniel-Meyer Coliseum (-); Fort Worth, Texas |
| 12/08/2001 | | at BYU | L 52–61 | 3–2 | Marriott Center (-); Provo, Utah |
| 12/12/2001 | | Nebraska; Rivalry | W 76–70 | 4–2 | Omaha Civic Auditorium (-); Omaha, Nebraska |
| 12/16/2001 | | Indiana State | W 70–46 | 5–2 | Omaha Civic Auditorium (-); Omaha, Nebraska |
| 12/19/2001 | | at Western Kentucky | L 61–95 | 5–3 | E. A. Diddle Arena (-); Bowling Green, Kentucky |
| 12/22/2001 | | Xavier | L 65–72 | 5–4 | Omaha Civic Auditorium (-); Omaha, Nebraska |
| 12/29/2001 | | Mississippi Valley State | W 90–65 | 6–4 | Omaha Civic Auditorium (-); Omaha, Nebraska |
| 01/02/2002 | | at Illinois State | W 72–62 | 7–4 | Redbird Arena (-); Normal, Illinois |
| 01/05/2002 | | at Northern Iowa | L 79–85 ^{OT} | 7–5 | UNI-Dome (-); Cedar Falls, Iowa |
| 01/09/2002 | | Evansville | W 88–74 | 8–5 | Omaha Civic Auditorium (-); Omaha, Nebraska |
| 01/13/2002 | | at Missouri State | W 80–74 | 9–5 | Hammons Student Center (-); Springfield, Missouri |
| 01/16/2002 | | Illinois State | W 63–56 | 10–5 | Omaha Civic Auditorium (-); Omaha, Nebraska |
| 01/19/2002 | | Bradley | W 76–63 | 11–5 | Omaha Civic Auditorium (-); Omaha, Nebraska |
| 01/22/2002 | | at Wichita State | W 67–55 | 12–5 | The Roundhouse (-); Wichita, Kansas |
| 01/26/2002 | | at Evansville | W 57–41 | 13–5 | Roberts Municipal Stadium (-); Evansville, Indiana |
| 01/30/2002 | | Missouri State | W 80–74 | 14–5 | Omaha Civic Auditorium (-); Omaha, Nebraska |
| 02/03/2002 | | Southern Illinois | L 77–79 | 14–6 | Omaha Civic Auditorium (-); Omaha, Nebraska |
| 02/06/2002 | | at Indiana State | W 64–63 | 15–6 | Hulman Center (-); Terre Haute, Indiana |
| 02/09/2002 | | Northern Iowa | W 83–56 | 16–6 | Omaha Civic Auditorium (-); Omaha, Nebraska |
| 02/13/2002 | | at Drake | W 95–91 ^{OT} | 17–6 | Knapp Center (-); Des Moines, Iowa |
| 02/17/2002 | | Wichita State | W 69–67 | 18–6 | Omaha Civic Auditorium (-); Omaha, Nebraska |
| 02/20/2002 | | at Southern Illinois | L 62–65 | 18–7 | SIU Arena (-); Carbondale, Illinois |
| 02/23/2002 | | at Bradley | W 80–64 | 19–7 | Carver Arena (-); Peoria, Illinois |
| 02/25/2002 | | Drake | L 73–75 | 19–8 | Omaha Civic Auditorium (-); Omaha, Nebraska |
Missouri Valley Conference tournament
| 03/02/2002 | (2) | vs. (7) Northern Iowa; Quarterfinals | W 80–65 | 20–8 | Scottrade Center (-); St. Louis, Missouri |
| 03/03/2002 | (2) | vs. (3) Illinois State; Semifinals | W 90–63 | 21–8 | Scottrade Center (-); St. Louis, Missouri |
| 03/04/2002 | (2) | vs. (1) Southern Illinois; Championship | W 84–76 | 22–8 | Scottrade Center (-); St. Louis, Missouri |
2002 NCAA tournament
| 03/15/2002 | (12 MW) | vs. (5 MW) No. 15 Florida; First Round | W 83–82 ^{2OT} | 23–8 | United Center (-); Chicago, Illinois |
| 03/17/2002 | (12 MW) | vs. (4 MW) No. 13 Illinois; Second Round | L 60–72 | 23–9 | United Center (-); Chicago, Illinois |
