= 1991 Missouri Valley Conference men's basketball tournament =

- Classification: Division I
- Season: 1990–91
- Teams: 9
- Site: Kiel Auditorium; St. Louis, Missouri
- Champions: Creighton (4th title)
- Winning coach: Tony Barone (2nd title)
- MVP: Bob Harstad (Creighton)

1990–91 Missouri Valley Conference men's basketball standings
	Conf.				Overall
Team	W		L	PCT	W		L	PCT
Creighton †	12	–	4	.750	24	–	8	.750
Southwest Missouri State	11	–	5	.688	22	–	12	.647
Tulsa	10	–	6	.625	18	–	12	.600
Indiana State	9	–	7	.563	14	–	14	.500
Southern Illinois	9	–	7	.563	18	–	14	.563
Wichita State	7	–	9	.438	14	–	17	.452
Bradley	6	–	10	.375	8	–	20	.286
Illinois State	4	–	12	.250	5	–	23	.179
Drake	4	–	12	.250	8	–	21	.276
† 1991 MVC tournament winner Rankings from AP Poll

The 1991 Missouri Valley Conference men's basketball tournament was played after the conclusion of the 1990–1991 regular season at Kiel Auditorium in St. Louis, Missouri.

The Creighton Bluejays defeated the Southwest Missouri State Bears in the championship game, 68-52, and as a result won their 4th MVC Tournament title and earned an automatic bid to the 1991 NCAA tournament.

== Bracket ==
Opening Round; March 1, 1991
8	Illinois State	55
9	Drake	57

Quarterfinals; March 2, 1991
1	Creighton	77
9	Drake	58
4	Indiana State	61
5	Southern Illinois	80
2	Southwest Missouri State	68
7	Bradley	49
3	Tulsa	71
6	Wichita State	52

Semifinals; March 3, 1991
1	Creighton	71
5	Southern Illinois	66
2	Southwest Missouri State	82
3	Tulsa	80^{2OT}

Final; March 4, 1991
1	Creighton	68
2	Southwest Missouri State	52
