= 1990–91 Creighton Bluejays men's basketball team =

American college basketball season

1990–91 Creighton Bluejays men's basketball
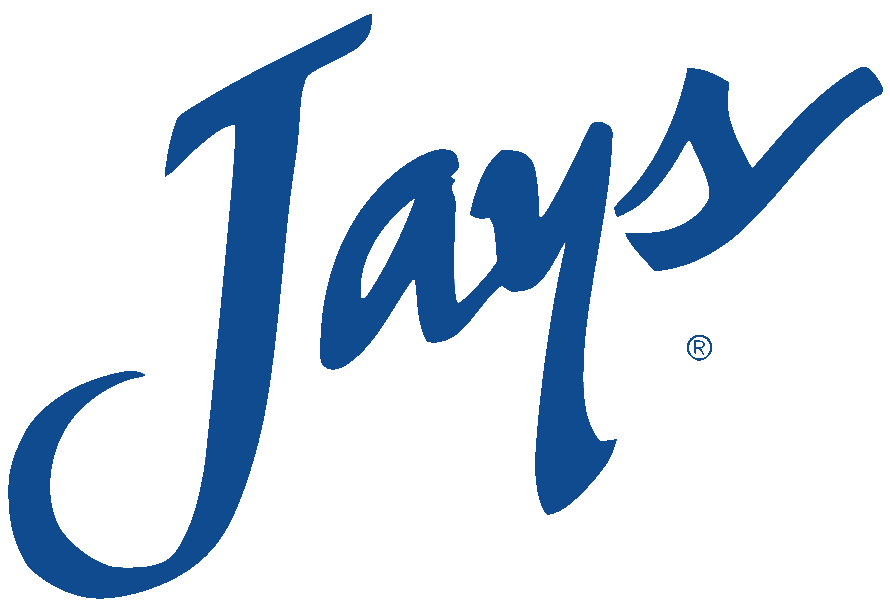

MVC Regular season champion MVC tournament champion

NCAA tournament, second round
- Conference: Missouri Valley Conference
- Record: 24–8 (12–4 MVC)
- Head coach: Tony Barone (6th season)
- Home arena: Omaha Civic Auditorium

1990–91 Missouri Valley Conference men's basketball standings
	Conf.				Overall
Team	W		L	PCT	W		L	PCT
Creighton †	12	–	4	.750	24	–	8	.750
Southwest Missouri State	11	–	5	.688	22	–	12	.647
Tulsa	10	–	6	.625	18	–	12	.600
Indiana State	9	–	7	.563	14	–	14	.500
Southern Illinois	9	–	7	.563	18	–	14	.563
Wichita State	7	–	9	.438	14	–	17	.452
Bradley	6	–	10	.375	8	–	20	.286
Illinois State	4	–	12	.250	5	–	23	.179
Drake	4	–	12	.250	8	–	21	.276
† 1991 MVC tournament winner Rankings from AP Poll

The 1990–91 Creighton Bluejays men's basketball team represented Creighton University during the 1990–91 NCAA Division I men's basketball season. The Bluejays, led by head coach Tony Barone, played their home games at the Omaha Civic Auditorium. The Jays finished with a 24–8 record (12–4 MVC), and won the Missouri Valley Conference tournament to earn an automatic bid to the 1991 NCAA tournament. As No. 11 seed in the West region, the Jays knocked off No. 6 seed New Mexico State in the opening round, then fell to Seton Hall in the second round.

== Roster ==
1990–91 Creighton Bluejays men's basketball team
Players
Coaches

Pos.	#	Name	Height	Weight	Year	Previous school	Hometown
G	12	Matt Petty	6 ft 3 in (1.91 m)	180 lb (82 kg)	So		Crawfordsville, Indiana
G	14	Duan Cole	5 ft 10 in (1.78 m)	165 lb (75 kg)	Sr		Fort Wayne, Indiana
F	15	Johnnie Williams	6 ft 5 in (1.96 m)	195 lb (88 kg)	Fr		Marion, Indiana
G	20	Denny Halligan	6 ft 3 in (1.91 m)	175 lb (79 kg)	Fr		Hawarden, Iowa
G	22	Derek Bain	6 ft 0 in (1.83 m)	170 lb (77 kg)	Fr		Austin, Texas
G	23	Todd Eisner	6 ft 7 in (2.01 m)	210 lb (95 kg)	Sr		Chilton, Wisconsin
G	24	Latrell Wrightsell	6 ft 1 in (1.85 m)	170 lb (77 kg)	Jr	Roosevelt	Gary, Indiana
C	25	Chad Gallagher	6 ft 10 in (2.08 m)	245 lb (111 kg)	Sr	Boylan Catholic	Rockford, Illinois
F	30	Bob Harstad	6 ft 6 in (1.98 m)	220 lb (100 kg)	Sr	Thompson Valley	Loveland, Colorado
F	31	Todd Geyer	6 ft 9 in (2.06 m)	200 lb (91 kg)	So		Indianapolis, Indiana
C	32	Bill O'Dowd	7 ft 0 in (2.13 m)	220 lb (100 kg)	Sr		Miami, Florida
F	40	Jerry Vanderheydt	6 ft 9 in (2.06 m)	210 lb (95 kg)	Fr		Pekin, Illinois
F	41	Greg Everett	6 ft 5 in (1.96 m)	195 lb (88 kg)	Fr		El Toro, California
F	42	Chris Rodgers	6 ft 7 in (2.01 m)	220 lb (100 kg)	Jr		East St. Louis, Illinois
F	44	Darin Plautz	6 ft 6 in (1.98 m)	190 lb (86 kg)	Sr		Tulsa, Oklahoma

Head coach

- Tony Barone (Duke)

Assistant coach(es)

Legend

- (C) Team captain
- (S) Suspended
- (I) Ineligible
- (W) Walk-on
- Injured
- Current redshirt

Roster

== Schedule and results ==
Date time, TV	Rank^{#}	Opponent^{#}	Result	Record	Site (attendance) city, state
Regular season
Nov 30, 1990*		vs. Texas-San Antonio; Amana-Hawkeye Classic	W 93–47	1–0	Carver-Hawkeye Arena; Iowa City, Iowa
Dec 1, 1990*		at Iowa; Amana-Hawkeye Classic	L 77–83	1–1	Carver-Hawkeye Arena; Iowa City, Iowa
Dec 4, 1990*		Missouri	W 74–68	2–1	Omaha Civic Auditorium; Omaha, Nebraska
Dec 6, 1990*		at Nebraska; Rivalry	L 63–97	2–2	Bob Devaney Sports Center; Lincoln, Nebraska
Dec 17, 1990*		at South Alabama	W 89–76	3–2	Mitchell Center; Mobile, Alabama
Dec 20, 1990		Tulsa	L 64–73	3–3 (0–1)	Omaha Civic Auditorium; Omaha, Nebraska
Dec 26, 1990*		Louisiana Tech	W 87–84	4–3	Omaha Civic Auditorium; Omaha, Nebraska
Dec 29, 1990*		at Cleveland State	W 87–64	5–3	Woodling Gym; Cleveland, Ohio
Jan 2, 1991		at SW Missouri State	L 71–72	5–4 (0–2)	Hammons Student Center; Springfield, Missouri
Jan 5, 1991		Bradley	W 98–74	6–4 (1–2)	Omaha Civic Auditorium; Omaha, Nebraska
Jan 8, 1991*		Iowa State	L 88–97	6–5	Omaha Civic Auditorium; Omaha, Nebraska
Jan 10, 1991		at Drake	W 82–61	7–5 (2–2)	Veterans Memorial Auditorium; Des Moines, Iowa
Jan 15, 1991		Wichita State	W 79–56	8–5 (3–2)	Omaha Civic Auditorium; Omaha, Nebraska
Jan 19, 1991		at Illinois State	L 68–71	8–6 (3–3)	Redbird Arena; Normal, Illinois
Jan 21, 1991		at Bradley	W 76–68	9–6 (4–3)	Carver Arena; Peoria, Illinois
Jan 26, 1991		Indiana State	W 83–68	10–6 (5–3)	Omaha Civic Auditorium; Omaha, Nebraska
Jan 28, 1991		at Southern Illinois	W 78–75	11–6 (6–3)	SIU Arena; Carbondale, Illinois
Jan 31, 1991		Illinois State	W 71–57	12–6 (7–3)	Omaha Civic Auditorium; Omaha, Nebraska
Feb 3, 1991*		at Siena	W 85–78	13–6	Times Union Center; Loudonville, New York
Feb 7, 1991		at Indiana State	W 71–68	14–6 (8–3)	Hulman Center; Terre Haute, Indiana
Feb 10, 1991*		SW Missouri State	W 91–87	15–6 (9–3)	Omaha Civic Auditorium; Omaha, Nebraska
Feb 13, 1991*		UTEP	W 75–62	16–6	Omaha Civic Auditorium; Omaha, Nebraska
Feb 16, 1991		at Tulsa	L 63–73	16–7 (9–4)	Tulsa Convention Center; Tulsa, Oklahoma
Feb 18, 1991*		at Notre Dame	W 90–67	17–7	Joyce Center; Notre Dame, Indiana
Feb 21, 1991		Drake	W 69–63	18–7 (10–4)	Omaha Civic Auditorium; Omaha, Nebraska
Feb 23, 1991		Southern Illinois	W 76–73	19–7 (11–4)	Omaha Civic Auditorium; Omaha, Nebraska
Feb 25, 1991		at Wichita State	W 65–64	20–7 (12–4)	Levitt Arena; Wichita, Kansas
Missouri Valley Conference tournament
Mar 2, 1991*		vs. Drake; MVC Tournament Quarterfinal	W 77–58	21–7	Kiel Auditorium; St. Louis, Missouri
Mar 3, 1991*		vs. Southern Illinois; MVC Tournament Semifinal	W 71–66	22–7	Kiel Auditorium; St. Louis, Missouri
Mar 4, 1991*		vs. SW Missouri State; MVC tournament championship	W 68–52	23–7	Kiel Auditorium; St. Louis, Missouri
1991 NCAA tournament
Mar 14, 1991*	(11 W)	vs. (6 W) No. 15 New Mexico State; First Round	W 64–56	24–7	Jon M. Huntsman Center; Salt Lake City, Utah
Mar 16, 1991*	(11 W)	vs. (3 W) No. 13 Seton Hall; Second Round	L 69–81	24–8	Jon M. Huntsman Center; Salt Lake City, Utah
*Non-conference game. ^{#}Rankings from AP poll. (#) Tournament seedings in parentheses. W=West. All times are in Central.

== Awards and honors ==
- Chad Gallagher – MVC Player of the Year

== NBA draft ==
Round	Pick	Player	NBA club
2	32	Chad Gallagher	Phoenix Suns
