= Jackie Carmichael =

American basketball player (born 1990)

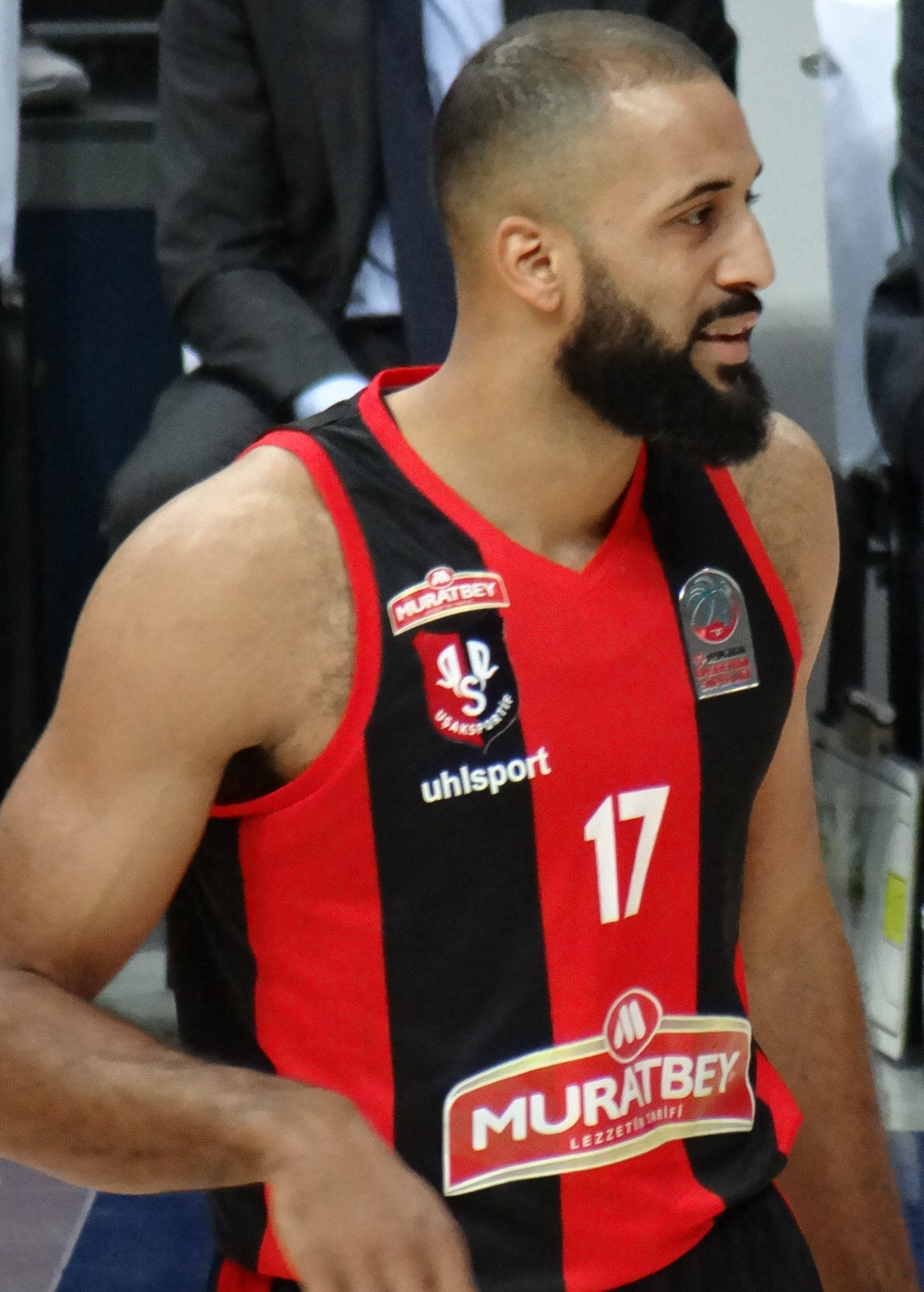
- Carmichael with Uşak Sportif in 2017

Personal information
- Born: January 2, 1990 (age 36) Manhattan, Kansas, U.S.
- Listed height: 6 ft 9 in (2.06 m)
- Listed weight: 240 lb (109 kg)

Career information
- High school: Manhattan (Manhattan, Kansas); South Kent School (South Kent, Connecticut)
- College: Illinois State (2009–2013)
- NBA draft: 2013: undrafted
- Playing career: 2013–2024
- Position: Power forward / center

Career history
- 2013: Bilbao Basket
- 2013–2014: Iowa Energy
- 2014–2015: Maccabi Rishon LeZion
- 2015–2016: Banvit
- 2016–2017: Maccabi Ashdod
- 2017–2018: Uşak Sportif
- 2018: Avtodor Saratov
- 2018: Al Riyadi Beirut
- 2018–2019: UNICS
- 2019: Konyaspor
- 2019–2020: JL Bourg
- 2020–2021: Igokea
- 2021: Cedevita Olimpija
- 2022–2023: Gaziantep Basketbol
- 2023–2024: Igokea

Career highlights
- Bosnian Cup winner (2021); NBA D-League All-Rookie Third Team (2014); First-team All-MVC (2013); Second-team All-MVC (2012); 2x MVC All-Defensive Team (2012, 2013)
- Stats at Basketball Reference

Jackie Ray Carmichael Jr. (born January 2, 1990) is an American former professional basketball player. He was a standout college player at Illinois State University before playing professionally in Spain, Israel, Turkey, Russia, Lebanon, Bosnia and Herzegovina, and Slovenia.

== College career ==
After a standout high school career at Manhattan High School in Manhattan, Kansas and year of prep school at South Kent School in Connecticut, Carmichael began his college career at Illinois State in 2009–10. As a freshman, Carmichael broke into the starting lineup at mid-season and averaged 6.8 points and 4 rebounds per game and was named to the Missouri Valley Conference (MVC) all-freshman team.

After progressively improving as a sophomore and junior, Carmichael had a breakout senior season. He averaged 17.4 points and 9.3 rebounds per game, and was named first team All-MVC and was named to the Lou Henson mid-major All-American team.

At the close of his college career, Carmichael left Illinois State as the school's all-time leading shot blocker (200), their third leading rebounder (942) and seventh leading scorer (1,580).

== Professional career ==
=== Spain / D-League (2013–2014) ===
Following the close of his college career, Carmichael was one of 63 players invited to the NBA Draft Combine for the 2013 NBA draft. After going undrafted in the 2013 draft, he joined the Miami Heat for the Orlando Summer League and the Dallas Mavericks for the Las Vegas Summer League.

On September 10, 2013, Carmichael signed a one-year deal with Bilbao Basket of Spain. On December 21, 2013, he left Bilbao after just 10 games. On December 31, 2013, he was acquired by the Iowa Energy.

=== Israel and Turkey (2014–2018) ===
In July 2014, Carmichael joined the Indiana Pacers for the 2014 NBA Summer League. On July 23, 2014, he signed a one-year deal with the Israeli team Maccabi Rishon LeZion. On April 11, 2015, Carmichael recorded a season-high 24 points, shooting 11-of-14 from the field, along with five rebounds, three assists and three steals in a 105–85 blowout win over Maccabi Tel Aviv.

In 38 games played for Rishon LeZion, he averaged 12.5 points, 6.8 rebounds and 1.1 assists per game. Carmichael helped Rishon LeZion to reach the 2015 Israeli League Semifinals, where they eventually were eliminated by Hapoel Jerusalem.

On July 24, 2015, Carmichael signed with Banvit of Turkey for the 2015–16 season. Carmichael helped Banvit to reach the 2016 Turkish League Quarterfinals, as well as reaching the 2016 Eurocup Eightfinals, where they eventually lost to EA7 Emporio Armani Milan.

On December 18, 2016, Carmichael signed with Maccabi Ashdod for the 2016–17 season. On April 21, 2017, Carmichael recorded a season-high 18 points, shooting 8-of-11 from the field, along with six rebounds and two assists in an 85–70 win over Maccabi Kiryat Gat.

On July 25, 2017, Carmichael signed with the Turkish club Demir İnşaat Büyükçekmece. However, On November 1, 2017, he parted ways with Büyükçekmece before appearing in any game for them and joined Uşak Sportif for the rest of the season. On May 13, 2018, Carmichael recorded a double-double and career-highs of 34 points and 16 rebounds, shooting 13-of-20 from the field, along with three assists and three blocks in a 91–76 win over Trabzonspor. In 23 games played during the 2017–18 season, Carmichael averaged 13.3 points, 7 rebounds, 1.9 assists and 1.1 blocks per game.

=== Russia, Lebanon and Turkey (2018–2019) ===
On August 22, 2018, Carmichael signed a one-year deal with the Russian team Avtodor Saratov. However, on October 17, 2018, Carmichael parted ways with Saratov after appearing in three games. Nine days later, Carmichael joined the Lebanese team Al Riyadi Beirut. On November 30, 2018, Carmichael signed a two-month contract with UNICS Kazan with an option to extend it for the rest of the season. However, on March 15, 2019, Carmichael parted ways with Kazan after appearing in 12 games.

On March 20, 2019, Carmichael joined Konyaspor of the Turkish Basketball First League, signing for the rest of the season.

=== France (2019–2020) ===
On August 12, 2019, he has signed with JL Bourg of LNB Pro A.

=== Bosnia and Herzegovina (2020–2021) ===
On June 14, 2020, Carmichael signed with KK Igokea of the ABA League, a one-year stay that culminated in Igokea winning the 2021 Bosnian Cup.

=== Slovenia (2021) ===
On July 19, 2021, Carmichael signed with Cedevita Olimpija of the ABA League.

=== Return to Turkey (2022–2023) ===
On November 26, 2022, he signed with Gaziantep Basketbol of the Basketbol Süper Ligi (BSL).

== Personal life ==
He is married to singer-songwriter and actress Lacy Cavalier.
