= 1997–98 Illinois State Redbirds men's basketball team =

American college basketball season

1997–98 Illinois State Redbirds men's basketball

MVC regular season champion MVC tournament champion

NCAA tournament, second round
- Conference: Missouri Valley Conference
- Record: 25–6 (16–2 MVC)
- Head coach: Kevin Stallings (5th season)
- Assistant coaches: Tom Richardson; King Rice; Chad Altadonna
- Home arena: Redbird Arena

1997–98 Missouri Valley Conference men's basketball standings
	Conf.				Overall
Team	W		L	PCT	W		L	PCT
Illinois State †	16	–	2	.889	25	–	6	.806
Creighton	12	–	6	.667	18	–	10	.643
Southwest Missouri State	11	–	7	.611	16	–	16	.500
Wichita State	11	–	7	.611	16	–	15	.516
Indiana State	10	–	8	.556	16	–	11	.593
Evansville	9	–	9	.500	15	–	15	.500
Bradley	9	–	9	.500	15	–	14	.517
Southern Illinois	8	–	10	.444	14	–	18	.438
Northern Iowa	4	–	14	.222	10	–	17	.370
Drake	0	–	18	.000	3	–	24	.111
† 1998 MVC tournament winner Rankings from AP Poll

The 1997–98 Illinois State Redbirds men's basketball team represented Illinois State University during the 1997–98 NCAA Division I men's basketball season. The Redbirds, led by fifth year head coach Kevin Stallings, played their home games at Redbird Arena and were a member of the Missouri Valley Conference.

The Redbirds finished the season 25–6, 16–2 in conference play to finish in first place. They were the number one seed for the Missouri Valley Conference tournament. They won their quarterfinal game versus Southern Illinois University, semifinal game versus the Wichita State University, and final game versus Southwest Missouri State University to earn the championship title.

The Redbirds received the conference automatic bid into the 1998 NCAA Division I men's basketball tournament. They were assigned to the Midwest Regional as the number eleven seed where they defeated the University of Tennessee in the first round and were beaten by the University of Arizona in the second round.

== Roster ==
1997–98 Illinois State Redbirds men's basketball team
Players
Coaches

Pos.	#	Name	Height	Weight	Year	Hometown
C	35	Rob Gibbons	6 ft 10 in (2.08 m)	—	RS Sr	Rockaway, NJ
G	11	Steve Hansell	6 ft 4 in (1.93 m)	—	Sr	Birmingham, England
F	44	Dan Muller	6 ft 6 in (1.98 m)	—	Sr	Lafayette, IN
G	13	Skipp Schaefbauer	6 ft 3 in (1.91 m)	—	Sr	Elk River, MN
G	15	Jamar Smiley	5 ft 11 in (1.8 m)	—	Sr	West Hempstead, NY
F	23	Kenneth Pierson	6 ft 8 in (2.03 m)	—	RS Jr	Conroe, TX
C	32	LeRoy Watkins	6 ft 7 in (2.01 m)	—	RS Jr	Chicago, IL
G	24	Kyle Cartmill	6 ft 0 in (1.83 m)	—	Jr	Quincy, IL
F	42	Rico Hill	6 ft 6 in (1.98 m)	—	Jr	Calumet Park, IL
F	14	Ben Holmstrom	6 ft 8 in (2.03 m)	—	Jr	Rockford, IL
F	50	L. Dee Murdock (I)	6 ft 9 in (2.06 m)	—	Jr	Columbus, KS
C	41	Sean Riley (I)	7 ft 0 in (2.13 m)	—	Jr	Houston, TX
C	33	Ronald vanVelzen	6 ft 10 in (2.08 m)	—	Jr	Noordwijk, Netherlands
G	25	Ryan Crowley	6 ft 5 in (1.96 m)	—	So	Naperville, IL
F	30	Joe Hein	6 ft 8 in (2.03 m)	—	So	Northbrook, IL
G	22	Nic Stotler	6 ft 0 in (1.83 m)	—	So	Brighton, IL
G	12	Tarise Bryson (I)	6 ft 1 in (1.85 m)	—	Fr	Decatur, IL

Head coach

- Kevin Stallings (Purdue)

Assistant coach(es)

- King Rice (North Carolina)
- Tom Richardson (Saint Xavier)
- Chad Altadonna (Illinois State)

Legend

- (C) Team captain
- (S) Suspended
- (I) Ineligible
- (W) Walk-on
- Injured
- Current redshirt

== Schedule ==
Date time, TV	Rank^{#}	Opponent^{#}	Result	Record	High points	High rebounds	High assists	Site (attendance) city, state
Exhibition Season
November 8, 1997*; 7:05 pm		Converse All–Stars	L 98–104		31 – Cartmill	–	–	Redbird Arena (6,820); Normal, IL
November 11, 1997*; 7:05 pm		Mornar–Yugoslavia	W 74–58		24 – Schaefbauer	–	–	Redbird Arena; Normal, IL
Regular Season
November 16, 1997*; 2:05 pm		Oakland	W 101–66	1–0	21 – Muller	7 – Hill, vanVelzen	11 – Hansell	Redbird Arena (8,711); Normal, IL
November 18, 1997*; 7:00 pm	No. 24	at Wisconsin	L 66–80	1–1	21 – Hill	6 – Hill	7 – Schaefbauer	Wisconsin Field House (11,500); Madison, WI
November 22, 1997*; 7:05 pm	No. 24	Pittsburgh	W 87–65	2–1	22 – Hill	14 – Hill	14 – Smiley	Redbird Arena (9,644); Normal, IL
November 29, 1997*; 1:00 am		vs. Northeast Louisiana; United Airlines Tip–Off [Semifinal]	W 73–60	3–1	21 – Hill	8 – Hill	6 – Smiley	Special Events Arena (10,254); Honolulu, HI
November 30, 1997*; 11:00 pm		at Hawai'i; United Airlines Tip–Off [Final]	L 63–84	3–2	16 – Hill	8 – Muller	4 – Muller, Cartmill	Special Events Arena (9,417); Honolulu, HI
December 6, 1997; 7:05 pm		Drake	W 76–57	4–2 (1–0)	23 – Muller	6 – Schaefbauer, Pierson	6 – Schaefbauer, Smiley	Redbird Arena (7,660); Normal, IL
December 13, 1997; 7:05 pm		at Creighton	W 71–62	5–2 (2–0)	17 – Hill	13 – Hill	5 – Hansell, Schaefbauer	Omaha Civic Auditorium (4,099); Omaha, NE
December 16, 1997*; 7:00 pm		at Illinois–Chicago	L 67–75	5–3	24 – Hill	9 – Hill	5 – Smiley	UIC Pavilion (5,640); Chicago, IL
December 20, 1997*; 7:35 pm		at Wisconsin–Green Bay	W 72–70	6–3	23 – Muller	5 – Muller	5 – Smiley	Brown County Veterans Memorial Arena (3,580); Ashwaubenon, WI
December 30, 1997; 7:05 pm		Indiana State	W 76–59	7–3 (3–0)	14 – Hill	7 – Muller, Watkins	6 – Smiley	Redbird Arena (7,522); Normal, IL
January 4, 1998*; 11:05 am, ESPN2		Pacific	W 64–63	8–3	19 – Muller	6 – Hill	5 – Muller	Redbird Arena (6,422); Normal, IL
January 7, 1998; 7:05 pm		at Drake	W 74–59	9–3 (4–0)	27 – Hill	13 – Hill	5 – Smiley	The Knapp Center (3,654); Des Moines, IA
January 10, 1998; 7:05 pm		Southern Illinois	W 105–70	10–3 (5–0)	20 – Hill	10 – Hill	10 – Smiley	Redbird Arena (9,379); Normal, IL
January 15, 1998; 7:35 pm		at Wichita State	W 56–53	11–3 (6–0)	17 – Hill	9 – Watkins	8 – Smiley	Henry Levitt Arena (5,028); Wichita, KS
January 18, 1998; 2:05 pm, MVC–TV		at Southwest Missouri State	L 81–89	11–4 (6–1)	31 – Hill	10 – Muller, Hill	10 – Smiley	John Q. Hammons Student Center (7,632); Springfield, MO
January 21, 1998; 7:05 pm, WEEK		at Bradley	W 57–54	12–4 (7–1)	15 – Cartmill	6 – Hill	8 – Smiley	Carver Arena (10,978); Peoria, IL
January 24, 1998; 7:05 pm		Wichita State	W 77–59	13–4 (8–1)	20 – Hill	10 – Gibbons	8 – Smiley	Redbird Arena (9,497); Normal, IL
January 28, 1998; 7:05 pm		at Southern Illinois	W 79–67	14–4 (9–1)	20 – Hill	9 – Smiley	7 – Smiley	SIU Arena (3,520); Carbondale, IL
January 31, 1998; 7:05 pm		Northern Iowa	W 88–77	15–4 (10–1)	31 – Hill	15 – Hill	9 – Smiley	Redbird Arena (9,641); Normal, IL
February 4, 1998; 7:05 pm, WMBD		Bradley	W 76–70	16–4 (11–1)	17 – Hill	5 – Muller	6 – Smiley	Redbird Arena (10,259); Normal, IL
February 7, 1998; 2:05 pm		at Indiana State	W 75-66	17–4 (12–1)	23 – Hill	14 – Hill	11 – Smiley	Hulman Center (10,206); Terre Haute, IN
February 10, 1998; 7:05 pm		Evansville	W 74–67	18–4 (13–1)	19 – Hill	8 – Smiley, Hill	8 – Smiley	Redbird Arena (8,238); Normal, IL
February 15, 1998; 11:05 am, ESPN		Southwest Missouri State	L 87–97	18–5 (13–2)	17 – Gibbons	12 – Hill	6 – Smiley	Redbird Arena (7,316); Normal, IL
February 18, 1998; 7:35 pm		at Evansville	W 80–76 ^{OT}	19–5 (14–2)	26 – Hill	7 – Muller	4 – Hansell, Muller, Cartmill	Roberts Municipal Stadium (8,160); Evansville, IN
February 21, 1998; 7:05 pm		Creighton	W 80–67	20–5 (15–2)	21 – Hill	9 – Hill	7 – Smiley	Redbird Arena (10,044); Normal, IL
February 23, 1998; 7:05 pm		at Northern Iowa	W 85–65	21–5 (16–2)	22 – Watkins	8 – Watkins	10 – Smiley	UNI Dome (2,232); Cedar Falls, IA
Missouri Valley Conference {MVC} tournament
February 28, 1998	(1)	(8) Southern Illinois; Quarterfinal	W 83–73	22–5	20 – Hill	7 – Muller	11 – Smiley	Kiel Center (9,679); St. Louis, MO
March 1, 1998	(1)	(4) Wichita State; Semifinal	W 75–54	23–5	19 – Hill	7 – Hill	6 – Smiley	Kiel Center (11,017); St. Louis, MO
March 2, 1998; 8:30 pm, ESPN	(1)	(3) Southwest Missouri State; Final	W 84–74	24–5	18 – Watkins	7 – Hansell	8 – Hansell	Kiel Center (9,228); St. Louis, MO
National Collegiate Athletic Association {NCAA} tournament
March 12, 1998; 6:45 pm, CBS	(9)	vs. (8) Tennessee; West Region [First Round]	W 82–81 ^{OT}	25–5	22 – Hill	10 – Muller	6 – Hansell, Cartmill	ARCO Arena (15,284); Sacramento, CA
March 14, 1998; 6:00 pm, CBS	(9)	vs. (1) No. 4 Arizona; West Region [Second Round]	L 49–82	25–6	17 – Muller	7 – Hill	4 – Cartmill, Hill	ARCO Arena (16,402); Sacramento, CA
*Non-conference game. ^{#}Rankings from AP Poll. (#) Tournament seedings in parentheses. All times are in Central Standard Time.
