= 2001–02 Southern Illinois Salukis men's basketball team =

American college basketball season

2001–02 Southern Illinois Salukis men's basketball

MVC Regular season champion

NCAA tournament, Sweet Sixteen
- Conference: Missouri Valley Conference

Ranking
- Coaches: No. 22
- Record: 28–8 (14–4 MVC)
- Head coach: Bruce Weber (4th season)
- Assistant coaches: Matt Painter; Chris Lowery
- Home arena: SIU Arena

2001–02 Missouri Valley Conference men's basketball standings
	Conf.				Overall
Team	W		L	PCT	W		L	PCT
Southern Illinois	14	–	4	.778	28	–	8	.778
Creighton †	14	–	4	.778	23	–	9	.719
Illinois State	12	–	6	.667	17	–	14	.548
Southwest Missouri State	11	–	7	.611	17	–	15	.531
Wichita State	9	–	9	.500	15	–	15	.500
Drake	9	–	9	.500	14	–	15	.483
Northern Iowa	8	–	10	.444	14	–	15	.483
Bradley	5	–	13	.278	9	–	20	.310
Indiana State	4	–	14	.222	6	–	22	.214
Evansville	4	–	14	.222	7	–	21	.250
† 2002 MVC tournament winner Rankings from AP Poll

The 2001–02 Southern Illinois Salukis men's basketball team represented Southern Illinois University Carbondale during the 2001–02 NCAA Division I men's basketball season. The Salukis were led by fourth-year head coach Bruce Weber and played their home games at the SIU Arena in Carbondale, Illinois as members of the Missouri Valley Conference. They finished the season 28–8, 14–4 in MVC play to finish tied for first place. They lost in the championship game of the MVC tournament to Creighton, but still received an at-large bid to the NCAA tournament as No. 11 seed in the East region. The Salukis upset Texas Tech and Georgia to reach the Sweet Sixteen, but fell to Connecticut in the regional semifinal round.

== Roster ==
2001–02 Southern Illinois Salukis men's basketball team
Players
Coaches

Pos.	#	Name	Height	Weight	Year	Previous school	Hometown
G	1	Darren Brooks	6 ft 3 in (1.91 m)	205 lb (93 kg)	Fr	Jennings	St. Louis, Missouri
G	3	Jamaal Tatum	6 ft 2 in (1.88 m)	175 lb (79 kg)	Fr	Helias Catholic	Jefferson City, Missouri
F	13	Brad Korn	6 ft 9 in (2.06 m)	195 lb (88 kg)	So		Oswego, IL
C	15	Rolan Roberts	6 ft 6 in (1.98 m)	240 lb (109 kg)	Sr		Woodbridge, VA
F	23	Jermaine Dearman	6 ft 8 in (2.03 m)	220 lb (100 kg)	Jr		Indianapolis, IN
G	33	Kent Williams	6 ft 2 in (1.88 m)	180 lb (82 kg)	Jr		Mt. Vernon, IL

Head coach

- Bruce Weber (Milwaukee)

Assistant coach(es)

Legend

- (C) Team captain
- (S) Suspended
- (I) Ineligible
- (W) Walk-on
- Injured
- Current redshirt

Roster

== Schedule and results ==
Date time, TV	Rank^{#}	Opponent^{#}	Result	Record	Site (attendance) city, state
Non-conference regular season
Nov 16, 2001*		Belmont	W 82–71	1–0	SIU Arena; Carbondale, Illinois
Nov 19, 2001*		at Saint Louis	W 69–64	2–0	Scottrade Center; St. Louis, Missouri
Nov 22, 2001*		vs. Iowa State; Las Vegas Invitational	W 66–57	3–0	Valley High School; Las Vegas, Nevada
Nov 23, 2001*		vs. Hartford; Las Vegas Invitational	W 78–46	4–0	Valley High School; Las Vegas, Nevada
Nov 24, 2001*		vs. No. 2 Illinois; Las Vegas Invitational	L 72–75	4–1	Valley High School; Las Vegas, Nevada
Nov 29, 2001*		Illinois-Chicago	W 76–68	5–1	SIU Arena; Carbondale, Illinois
Dec 1, 2001*		Indiana	W 72–60	6–1	SIU Arena; Carbondale, Illinois
Dec 8, 2001*		at George Mason	W 73–66	7–1	Patriot Center; Fairfax, Virginia
Dec 16, 2001*		at Cal State Northridge	W 74–60	8–1	Matadome; Northridge, California
Dec 18, 2001*		at Colorado State	L 62–80	8–2	Moby Arena; Fort Collins, Colorado
Dec 22, 2001*		Southeast Missouri State	W 92–80	9–2	SIU Arena; Carbondale, Illinois
Dec 29, 2001*		at Murray State	W 67–63	10–2	Regional Special Events Center; Murray, Kentucky
Missouri Valley regular season
Jan 2, 2002		at Evansville	W 82–72	11–2 (1–0)	Roberts Stadium; Evansville, Indiana
Jan 5, 2002		Illinois State	W 79–58	12–2 (2–0)	SIU Arena; Carbondale, Illinois
Jan 7, 2002		Missouri State	W 84–74	13–2 (3–0)	SIU Arena; Carbondale, Illinois
Jan 10, 2002		at Wichita State	L 79–88	13–3 (3–1)	Levitt Arena; Wichita, Kansas
Jan 12, 2002		Northern Iowa	W 83–58	14–3 (4–1)	SIU Arena; Carbondale, Illinois
Jan 16, 2002		at Bradley	W 55–49	15–3 (5–1)	Carver Arena; Peoria, Illinois
Jan 19, 2002		Indiana State	W 91–73	16–3 (6–1)	SIU Arena; Carbondale, Illinois
Jan 24, 2002		at Drake	W 79–64	17–3 (7–1)	Knapp Center; Des Moines, Iowa
Jan 26, 2002		at Northern Iowa	L 64–69	17–4 (7–2)	UNI-Dome; Cedar Falls, Iowa
Jan 30, 2002		Evansville	W 101–62	18–4 (8–2)	SIU Arena; Carbondale, Illinois
Feb 3, 2002		at Creighton	W 79–77	19–4 (9–2)	Omaha Civic Auditorium; Omaha, Nebraska
Feb 6, 2002		Wichita State	W 78–58	20–4 (10–2)	SIU Arena; Carbondale, Illinois
Feb 9, 2002		Drake	W 66–57	21–4 (11–2)	SIU Arena; Carbondale, Illinois
Feb 13, 2002		at Missouri State	L 71–78	21–5 (11–3)	Hammons Student Center; Springfield, Missouri
Feb 16, 2002		at Illinois State	L 70–84	21–6 (11–4)	Redbird Arena; Normal, Illinois
Feb 20, 2002		Creighton	W 65–62	22–6 (12–4)	SIU Arena; Carbondale, Illinois
Feb 23, 2002		at Indiana State	W 84–74	23–6 (13–4)	Hulman Center; Terre Haute, Indiana
Feb 25, 2002		Bradley	W 84–73	24–6 (14–4)	SIU Arena; Carbondale, Illinois
Missouri Valley tournament
Mar 2, 2002*		vs. Bradley; Quarterfinals	W 66–44	25–6	Scottrade Center; St. Louis, Missouri
Mar 3, 2002*		vs. Missouri State; Semifinals	W 86–63	26–6	Scottrade Center; St. Louis, Missouri
Mar 4, 2002*		vs. Creighton; Championship Game	L 76–84	26–7	Scottrade Center; St. Louis, Missouri
NCAA tournament
Mar 15, 2002*	(11 E)	vs. (6 E) Texas Tech; First Round	W 76–68	27–7	United Center; Chicago, Illinois
Mar 17, 2002*	(11 E)	vs. (3 E) No. 23 Georgia; Second Round	W 77–75	28–7	United Center; Chicago, Illinois
Mar 22, 2002*	(11 E)	vs. (2 E) No. 10 Connecticut; East Regional semifinal – Sweet Sixteen	L 59–71	28–8	Carrier Dome (29,252); Syracuse, New York
*Non-conference game. ^{#}Rankings from AP poll. (#) Tournament seedings in parentheses. E=East. All times are in Central Time.
