= 2002 Missouri Valley Conference men's basketball tournament =

- Classification: Division I
- Season: 2001–02
- Teams: 10
- Site: Savvis Center; St. Louis, Missouri
- Champions: Creighton (7th title)
- Winning coach: Dana Altman (3rd title)
- MVP: Kyle Korver (Creighton)

2001–02 Missouri Valley Conference men's basketball standings
	Conf.				Overall
Team	W		L	PCT	W		L	PCT
Southern Illinois	14	–	4	.778	28	–	8	.778
Creighton †	14	–	4	.778	23	–	9	.719
Illinois State	12	–	6	.667	17	–	14	.548
Southwest Missouri State	11	–	7	.611	17	–	15	.531
Wichita State	9	–	9	.500	15	–	15	.500
Drake	9	–	9	.500	14	–	15	.483
Northern Iowa	8	–	10	.444	14	–	15	.483
Bradley	5	–	13	.278	9	–	20	.310
Indiana State	4	–	14	.222	6	–	22	.214
Evansville	4	–	14	.222	7	–	21	.250
† 2002 MVC tournament winner Rankings from AP Poll

The 2002 Missouri Valley Conference men's basketball tournament was played from March 1-4, 2002 at the Savvis Center in St. Louis, Missouri at the conclusion of the 2001–2002 regular season. The Creighton won their 7th MVC tournament title to earn an automatic bid to the 2002 NCAA tournament.

== Tournament Bracket ==
Opening Round; Thursday, March 1
8	Bradley	70
9	Indiana State	58
7	Northern Iowa	78
10	Evansville	75

Quarterfinals; Friday, March 2
1	Southern Illinois	66
8	Bradley	44
4	Southwest Missouri State	72
5	Wichita State	59
2	Creighton	80
7	Northern Iowa	65
3	Illinois State	64
6	Drake	63

Semifinals; Saturday, March 3
1	Southern Illinois	86
4	Southwest Missouri State	63
2	Creighton	90
3	Illinois State	63

Final; Sunday, March 4
1	Southern Illinois	76
2	Creighton	84

== See also ==
- Missouri Valley Conference
