= 2001–02 Illinois State Redbirds men's basketball team =

American college basketball season

2001–02 Illinois State Redbirds men's basketball
- Conference: Missouri Valley Conference
- Record: 17–14 (12–6 MVC)
- Head coach: Tom Richardson (3rd season)
- Assistant coaches: Doug Novsek; Chad Altadonna; Anthony Beane
- Home arena: Redbird Arena

2001–02 Missouri Valley Conference men's basketball standings
| | Conf. | | | | Overall |
| Team | W | | L | PCT | W | | L | PCT |
|---|---|---|---|---|---|---|---|---|
| Southern Illinois | 14 | – | 4 | .778 | 28 | – | 8 | .778 |
| Creighton † | 14 | – | 4 | .778 | 23 | – | 9 | .719 |
| Illinois State | 12 | – | 6 | .667 | 17 | – | 14 | .548 |
| Southwest Missouri State | 11 | – | 7 | .611 | 17 | – | 15 | .531 |
| Wichita State | 9 | – | 9 | .500 | 15 | – | 15 | .500 |
| Drake | 9 | – | 9 | .500 | 14 | – | 15 | .483 |
| Northern Iowa | 8 | – | 10 | .444 | 14 | – | 15 | .483 |
| Bradley | 5 | – | 13 | .278 | 9 | – | 20 | .310 |
| Indiana State | 4 | – | 14 | .222 | 6 | – | 22 | .214 |
| Evansville | 4 | – | 14 | .222 | 7 | – | 21 | .250 |
† 2002 MVC tournament winner Rankings from AP Poll

The 2001–02 Illinois State Redbirds men's basketball team represented Illinois State University during the 2001–02 NCAA Division I men's basketball season. The Redbirds, led by third year head coach Tom Richardson, played their home games at Redbird Arena and competed as a member of the Missouri Valley Conference.

They finished the season 17–14, 12–6 in conference play to finish in third place. They were the number three seed for the Missouri Valley Conference tournament. They were victorious over Drake University in their quarterfinal game but were defeated by Creighton University in their semifinal game.

== Roster ==
2001–02 Illinois State Redbirds men's basketball team
Players
Coaches

| Pos. | # | Name | Height | Weight | Year | Hometown |
|---|---|---|---|---|---|---|
| G | 12 | Tarise Bryson | 6 ft 1 in (1.85 m) | — | Sr | Decatur, IL |
| F | 33 | Shedrick Ford | 6 ft 5 in (1.96 m) | — | Sr | Macon, GA |
| G | 21 | Shawn Jeppson | 6 ft 2 in (1.88 m) | — | Sr | Spring Valley, IL |
| F | 31 | Chad Mazanowski | 6 ft 6 in (1.98 m) | — | Sr | DeKalb, IL |
| G | 15 | Randy Rice | 6 ft 0 in (1.83 m) | — | Sr | Springfield, IL |
| F | 23 | Baboucarr Bojang | 6 ft 9 in (2.06 m) | — | Jr | Greenville, SC |
| F | 44 | Brett Gillan | 6 ft 5 in (1.96 m) | — | Jr | Normal, IL |
| F | 40 | Casey Reid | 6 ft 7 in (2.01 m) | — | Jr | Las Vegas, NV |
| C | 5 | Andy Strandmark | 6 ft 11 in (2.11 m) | — | Jr | Geneseo, IL |
| F | 4 | Dirk Williams | 6 ft 8 in (2.03 m) | — | So | Pekin, IL |
| G | 2 | Gregg Alexander | 6 ft 4 in (1.93 m) | — | Fr | Lincoln, IL |
| G | 11 | Vince Greene | 5 ft 9 in (1.75 m) | — | Fr | Chicago, IL |
| F | 34 | Kenneth Hill | 6 ft 6 in (1.98 m) | — | Fr | Naperville, IL |
| G | 10 | Kevin Troc (redshirt) | 6 ft 4 in (1.93 m) | — | Fr | Lockport, IL |

Head coach

- Tom Richardson (Saint Xavier)

Assistant coach(es)

- Doug Novsek (Southern Illinois)
- Chad Altadonna (Illinois State)
- Anthony Beane (Kansas State)

Legend

- (C) Team captain
- (S) Suspended
- (I) Ineligible
- (W) Walk-on
- Injured
- Current redshirt

== Schedule ==
| Date time, TV | Rank^{#} | Opponent^{#} | Result | Record | High points | High rebounds | High assists | Site (attendance) city, state |
Regular Season
| November 16, 2001* | | Weber State | W 74–70 | 1–0 | 18 – Ford | 10 – Bojang | 5 – Jeppson | Redbird Arena (6,846); Normal, IL |
| November 23, 2001* | | vs. California–Irvine; University Hoops Classic [Quarterfinal] | W 58–52 | 2–0 | 13 – Bojang | 9 – Bojang | 4 – Greene | Charles L. Sewall Center (1,824); Moon Township, PA |
| November 24, 2001* | | vs. Pittsburgh; University Hoops Classic [Semifinal] | L 46–65 | 2–1 | 13 – Ford | 5 – Ford, Bojang | 2 – Jeppson, Rice, Alexander | Charles L. Sewall Center (1,349); Moon Township, PA |
| November 25, 2001* | | vs. Hofstra; University Hoops Classic [Third Place] | L 80–82 ^{OT} | 2–2 | 24 – Alexander | 11 – Bojang | 5 – Jeppson, Rice | Charles L. Sewall Center (1,214); Moon Township, PA |
| November 29, 2001* | | at Georgia Southern | L 76–87 | 2–3 | 19 – Jeppson | 19 – Bojang | 4 – Greene | Hanner Fieldhouse (1,465); Statesboro, GA |
| December 1, 2001* | | at Texas–San Antonio | L 82–88 | 2–4 | 20 – Bojang | 6 – Bojang | 3 – Ford, Greene | Convocation Center (2,240); San Antonio, TX |
| December 8, 2001* | | Samford | W 65–54 | 3–4 | 14 – Greene | 5 – Bojang | 4 – Greene, Alexander | Redbird Arena (6,222); Normal, IL |
| December 9, 2001* | | Central Michigan | W 72–63 | 4–4 | 20 – Bojang | 13 – Bojang | 4 – Alexander | Redbird Arena (5,078); Normal, IL |
| December 15, 2001* | | at Tennessee–Chattanooga | L 59–70 | 4–5 | 26 – Bojang | 8 – Bojang | 7 – Rice | McKenzie Arena (2,130); Chattanooga, TN |
| December 18, 2001*; 7:00 pm | | at No. 7 Illinois | L 73–87 | 4–6 | 15 – Bojang, Alexander | 7 – Strandmark | 5 – Greene | Assembly Hall (16,500); Champaign, IL |
| December 22, 2001* | | Kent State | L 48–61 | 4–7 | 12 – Jeppson | 7 – Strandmark | 4 – Ford, Rice, Greene | Redbird Arena (4,802); Normal, IL |
| January 2, 2002; 7:05 pm | | Creighton | L 62–76 | 4–8 (0–1) | 13 – Bojang | 5 – Williams | 3 – Alexander | Redbird Arena (5,182); Normal, IL |
| January 5, 2002; 3:05 pm | | at Southern Illinois | L 58–79 | 4–9 (0–2) | 16 – Ford | 9 – Bojang | 3 – Alexander | SIU Arena (6,211); Carbondale, IL |
| January 7, 2002; 7:05 pm | | Wichita State | W 81–71 | 5–9 (1–2) | 27 – Jeppson | 7 – Bojang | 3 – Jeppson, Rice, Reid | Redbird Arena (4,776); Normal, IL |
| January 9, 2002 | | at Drake | L 73–83 | 5–10 (1–3) | 17 – Alexander | 7 – Bojang | 3 – Rice | The Knapp Center (3,517); Des Monies, IA |
| January 12, 2002; 4:00 pm, ESPN2 | | Indiana State | W 68–56 | 6–10 (2–3) | 15 – Bojang | 11 – Bojang | 4 – Rice | Redbird Arena (5,790); Normal, IL |
| January 16, 2002; 7:05 pm | | at Creighton | L 56–63 | 6–11 (2–4) | 15 – Bojang | 7 – Bojang | 6 – Rice | Omaha Civic Auditorium (5,324); Omaha, NE |
| January 19, 2002 | | Southwest Missouri State | W 61–60 | 7–11 (3–4) | 14 – Jeppson | 6 – Williams | 6 – Rice | Redbird Arena (6,569); Normal, IL |
| January 23, 2002; WEEK | | at Bradley | W 58–55 | 8–11 (4–4) | 16 – Alexander | 7 – Rice | 9 – Rice | Carver Arena (10,392); Peoria, IL |
| January 26, 2002 | | Drake | W 68–54 | 9–11 (5–4) | 17 – Rice | 10 – Bojang | 4 – Rice | Redbird Arena (8,010); Normal, IL |
| January 30, 2002 | | Northern Iowa | W 70–55 | 10–11 (6–4) | 23 – Bojang | 15 – Bojang | 6 – Rice | Redbird Arena (5,697); Normal, IL |
| February 2, 2002 | | at Southwest Missouri State | L 63–68 | 10–12 (6–5) | 13 – Bojang | 9 – Bojang | 4 – Rice | John Q. Hammons Student Center (6,210); Springfield, MO |
| February 5, 2002; WMBD | | Bradley | W 60–51 | 11–12 (7–5) | 16 – Ford | 7 – Bojang | 3 – Jeppson | Redbird Arena (8,663); Normal, IL |
| February 9, 2002 | | at Indiana State | W 67–61 | 12–12 (8–5) | 15 – Rice | 7 – Ford, Bojang | 9 – Rice | Hulman Center (5,088); Terre Haute, IN |
| February 13, 2002 | | at Evansville | W 73–55 | 13–12 (9–5) | 14 – Bojang, Alexander | 12 – Bojang | 4 – Bojang | Roberts Municipal Stadium (5,008); Evansville, IN |
| February 16, 2002; 2:05 pm | | Southern Illinois | W 84–70 | 14–12 (10–5) | 22 – Jeppson | 9 – Bojang | 8 – Rice | Redbird Arena (9,451); Normal, IL |
| February 20, 2002; 7:05 pm | | at Wichita State | L 66–77 | 14–13 (10–6) | 16 – Jeppson | 8 – Bojang | 4 – Rice | Henry Levitt Arena (7,683); Wichita, KS |
| February 23, 2002 | | at Northern Iowa | W 71–66 | 15–13 (11–6) | 20 – Jeppson | 8 – Ford | 5 – Rice | UNI Dome (3,361); Cedar Falls, IA |
| February 25, 2002 | | Evansville | W 82–73 ^{OT} | 16–13 (12–6) | 22 – Jeppson | 11 – Bojang | 6 – Rice | Redbird Arena (7,034); Normal, IL |
State Farm Missouri Valley Conference {MVC} tournament
| March 2, 2002* | (3) | vs. (6) Drake; Quarterfinal | W 64–63 | 17–13 | 24 – Jeppson | 4 – Jeppson | 7 – Rice | Savvis Center (8,055); St. Louis, MO |
| March 3, 2002*; 5:00 pm | (3) | vs. (2) Creighton; Semifinal | L 63–90 | 17–14 | 14 – Rice | 8 – Bojang | 3 – Alexander | Savvis Center (10,722); St. Louis, MO |
*Non-conference game. ^{#}Rankings from AP Poll. (#) Tournament seedings in parentheses. All times are in Central Standard Time.
