= Reggie Lynch =

American basketball player (born 1994)

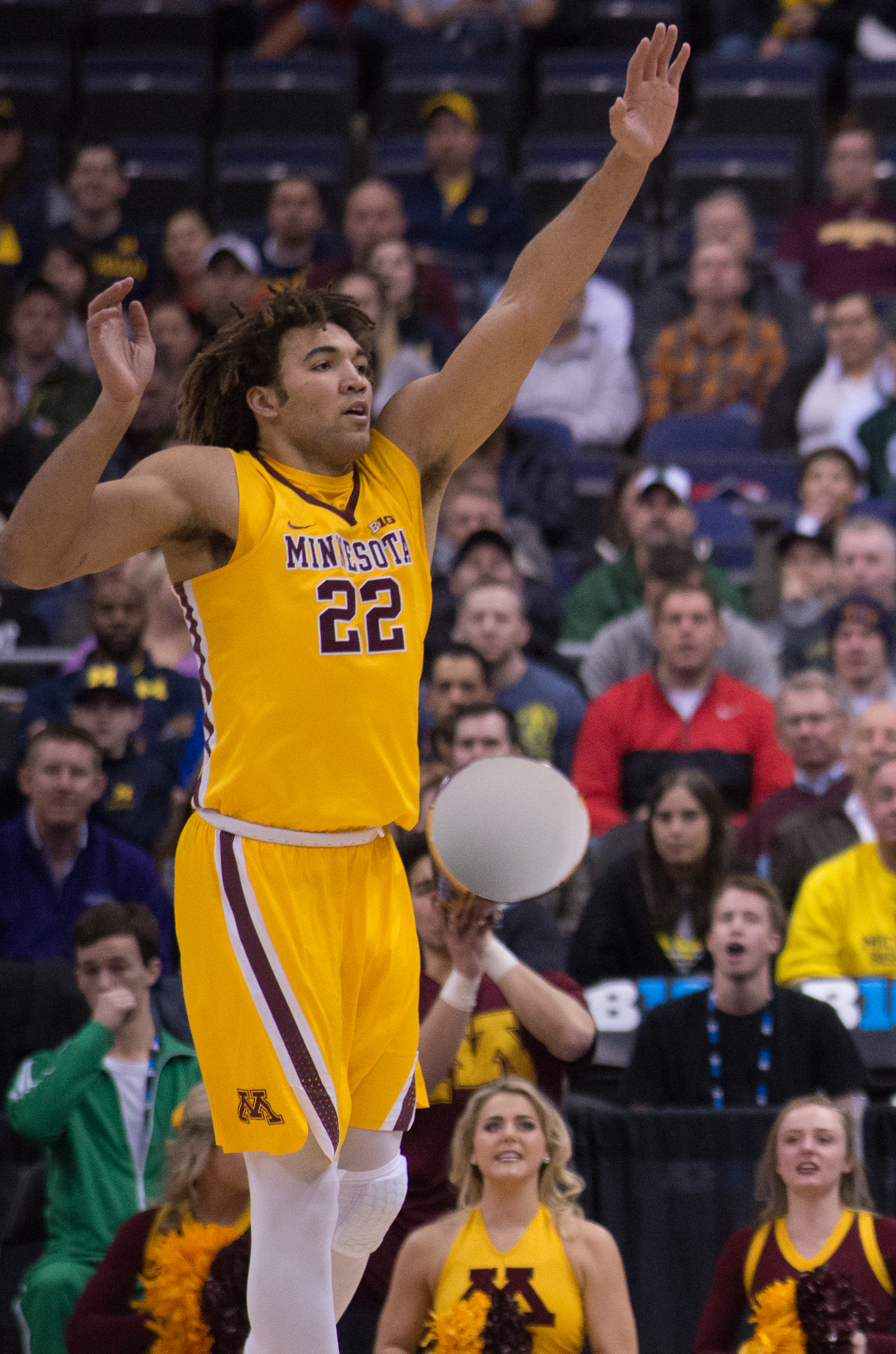
- Lynch playing for Minnesota

No. 50 – Halcones de Xalapa
- Position: Center
- League: LNBP

Personal information
- Born: November 30, 1994 (age 31) Edina, Minnesota, U.S.
- Listed height: 2.08 m (6 ft 10 in)
- Listed weight: 118 kg (260 lb)

Career information
- High school: Edina (Edina, Minnesota)
- College: Illinois State (2013–2015); Minnesota (2016–2018)
- NBA draft: 2018: undrafted
- Playing career: 2018–present

Career history
- 2018–2019: BC Kalev
- 2020–2021: Lokomotiv Kuban
- 2021: Iraklis Thessaloniki
- 2021–2022: Napoli Basket
- 2022: Baskets Oldenburg
- 2023: Juventus Utena
- 2023–2024: Bnei Herzliya
- 2024: Soles de Mexicali
- 2024–2025: Śląsk Wrocław
- 2025–present: Halcones de Xalapa

Career highlights
- Polish Supercup winner (2024); Polish Supercup MVP (2024); Israeli Premier League blocks leader (2024); Lithuanian League blocks leader (2023); 2× VTB United League blocks leader (2019, 2021); Serie A2 Defensive Player of the Year (2020); Estonian League champion (2019); Big Ten Defensive Player of the Year (2017)

Reginald Joseph Connor Lynch (born November 30, 1994) is an American professional basketball player for Halcones de Xalapa of the Liga Nacional de Baloncesto Profesional (LNBP). He played college basketball for the Minnesota Golden Gophers. He transferred from Illinois State in 2015 and sat out the 2015–16 season. In 2016, he started at center for the Gophers and won Big Ten Defensive Player of the Year after setting the Gophers single-season record in blocks with 114.

== High school career ==
College recruiting
Name	Hometown	School	Height	Weight	Commit date
Reggie Lynch; C	Edina, MN	Edina	6 ft 10 in (2.08 m)	257 lb (117 kg)	Nov 9, 2013
Reggie Lynch; C	Recruit ratings: Scout: Rivals: 247Sports: ESPN:				
Overall recruit ranking:
Note: In many cases, Scout, Rivals, 247Sports, On3, and ESPN may conflict in their listings of height and weight.; In these cases, the average was taken. ESPN grades are on a 100-point scale.; Sources: "2013 Team Ranking". Rivals.

Lynch played for Edina Highschool and helped the team reach the Minnesota State Tournament for the first time in over 2 decades.

== College career ==
=== 2015–16 season ===
Lynch transferred from Illinois State University to the Minnesota Golden Gophers. Lynch sat out the season due to NCAA transfer rules.

=== 2016–17 season ===
Lynch started 33 games for the Gophers. He won Big Ten Defensive Player of the year after recording 114 blocks which were second best in the entire nation. He had at least 5 blocks in 11 games during the season including a game where he posted 11 blocks at home against Penn State on February 25. Lynch was named the Big Ten Conference Defensive Player of the Year. While also helping to take the Gophers to the NCAA tournament and making the biggest season-to-season turnaround in college basketball history.

=== 2017–18 season ===
Lynch played the first 16 games of the season for the Golden Gophers averaging 10.1 points 8 rebounds and 4.1 blocks per game before exiting the university after being found responsible for acts of sexual misconduct. Lynch initially appealed the expulsion but dropped the appeal in February 2018 to start his professional career.

== College statistics ==
Legend
GP	Games played	GS	Games started	MPG	Minutes per game
FG%	Field goal percentage	3P%	3-point field goal percentage	FT%	Free throw percentage
RPG	Rebounds per game	APG	Assists per game	SPG	Steals per game
BPG	Blocks per game	PPG	Points per game	**Bold**	Career high

Year	Team	GP	GS	MPG	FG%	3P%	FT%	RPG	APG	SPG	BPG	PPG
2013–14	Illinois State	**34**	20	20.3	.582	.000	.553	4.8	.2	.6	2.8	8.3
2014–15	Illinois State	33	30	22.2	.509	.000	.683	5.4	.2	**.7**	2.8	9.5
2015–16	Minnesota	Redshirt										
2016–17	Minnesota	33	**33**	23.1	.543	.000	.639	6.1	.5	.5	3.5	8.4
2017–18	Minnesota	16	16	**26.4**	**.584**	.000	**.717**	**8.0**	**1.3**	**.7**	**4.1**	**10.1**
Career		116	99	22.5	.548	.000	.639	5.8	.5	.6	3.2	8.9

== Professional career ==
=== BC Kalev/Cramo Tallinn (2018–2019) ===
On July 20, 2018, Lynch signed with Estonian team Kalev/Cramo. He averaged 7.2 points 4.5 rebounds and 2.5 blocks.

=== Urania Basket Milano (2019–2020) ===
He spent the 2019–20 season for Serie A2 team Urania Basket Milano, averaging 11.3 points and 6.5 rebounds and 3.0 blocks per game.

=== Lokomotiv Kuban (2020–2021) ===
On August 16, 2020, Lynch signed a three-year deal with Lokomotiv Kuban of the VTB United League and the EuroCup.

=== Iraklis BC Thessaloniki (2021–2022) ===
On August 11, 2021, Lynch signed with Iraklis Thessaloniki of the Greek Basket League.

=== Gevi Napoli Basket (2021–2022) ===
On November 22, 2021, he parted ways with the Greek team, in order to sign with Italian club Napoli Basket. In 6 Greek Basket League games with Iraklis, he averaged 12 points, 5.3 rebounds and 3.5 blocks, playing around 27 minutes per contest.

=== EWE Baskets Oldenburg (2022) ===
On March 29, 2022, Lynch signed with Baskets Oldenburg of the German Basketball Bundesliga until the end of the season.

=== Uniclub Casino Juventus Utenos (2022–2023) ===
On January 10, 2023, Lynch signed with Juventus Utena of the Lithuanian Basketball League (LKL). He led the league in blocks, with 2.2 per game.

=== Bnei Ofek Dist Hertzeliya (2023–2024) ===
On August 13, 2023, Lynch signed with Bnei Herzliya of the Israeli Basketball Premier League.

=== Soles de Mexicali (2024) ===
In July 2024, Reggie joined Soles de Mexicali of the Mexican LNBP. In 6 games, he averaged 8.7 points, 4.8 rebounds and 2.2 blocks per game.

=== WKS Slask Wroclaw (2024–2025) ===
On August 30, 2024, Lynch signed with Slask Wroclaw of the Polish Basketball League.
