= Will Robinson (basketball) =

American college basketball coach and scout (1911–2008)

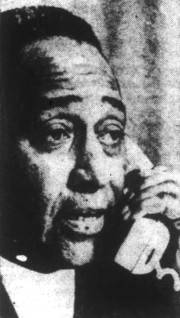
- Robinson, circa 1970

Biographical details
- Born: June 3, 1911; Wadesboro, North Carolina, U.S.
- Died: April 23, 2008 (aged 96); Detroit, Michigan, U.S.

Playing career
- 1933–1937: West Virginia State (lettered in four sports)

Coaching career (HC unless noted)
- 1943–1959: Sidney D. Miller MS
- 1960–1971: Pershing HS
- 1971–1975: Illinois State

Head coaching record
- Overall: 62–41 (college)

William J. Robinson (June 3, 1911 – April 28, 2008) was an American college basketball coach and scout. Robinson became the first African-American head coach in NCAA Division I history when he accepted the position at Illinois State University in 1970. He scouted for the Detroit Pistons for 28 years, and worked 22 years for the Detroit Lions as a part-time scout. Robinson, who is a member of seven athletic halls of fame, was also the first black high school coach in Michigan, winning two state championships in basketball.

== Early life ==
Robinson was born in Wadesboro, North Carolina, and attended Steubenville High School in Steubenville, Ohio, where he quarterbacked the football team and played on the golf team. Robinson led his football team to an undefeated, unscored upon season, and finished second in the state golf tournament despite not being allowed on the course with the white players. He was also the captain of both the golf and football teams and also played baseball and ran track, the only player in state history to letter in five sports. Robinson also lettered in four sports at West Virginia State University, graduating in 1937.

== Coaching career ==
After graduating from West Virginia State Robinson was unable to find a job, and sought a master's degree. Because of racial segregation in West Virginia, Robinson was forced to attend graduate school at the University of Michigan, earning a master's in physical education. After finishing graduate school, Robinson still could not find a job, and returned to Steubenville, and later began coaching at a YMCA in nearby Pittsburgh, Pennsylvania. He also coached YMCA basketball in Chicago, winning several city championships.

Robinson's YMCA success got him his first high school coaching job at DuSable High School in Chicago. In 1943, Robinson was selected to take the head coaching position at Miller High School in Detroit. He was chosen as the person to calm an uneasy racial situation due to race riots in the city the previous summer. Robinson was the only black coach in Detroit for the next sixteen years. Robinson left Miller High and later went to Pershing High School in Detroit, where he won the state title in 1967 with a team led by Spencer Haywood, Ralph Simpson, Glenn Doughty, Paul Seal, and Marvin Lane, and won a second state title in 1970. He also coached Mel Daniels, Big Daddy Lipscomb and Ted Sizemore at the high school level. During his high school coaching career Robinson enabled more than 300 students to attend college, and organized coaching clinics for black coaches in the south, recruiting staff members of the Detroit Lions and Detroit Tigers to provide instruction. As a result of his efforts at the coaching clinics, Lions coach Buddy Parker hired Robinson as the first black scout in the NFL. As a scout Robinson discovered Pro Football Hall of Famers Charlie Sanders and Lem Barney.

In 1970 Robinson was hired as the head coach at Illinois State University, making him the first black head coach in NCAA Division I basketball. He compiled a record of 78-51 from 1970 to 1975 (see Illinois State Redbirds Men's Basketball Season-By-Season Records). His best player during that time was Doug Collins, the school's only consensus All-American and the #1 pick in the 1973 NBA draft. In 2003 Robinson received a lifetime achievement award from the Missouri Valley Conference.

== The Pistons era ==
Will Robinson retired from Illinois State in 1975, and accepted a position as a scout for the Detroit Pistons in 1976. Robinson was responsible for discovering Joe Dumars and Dennis Rodman, key members of the Pistons' championship teams in 1989 and 1990. Robinson was actually offered the Pistons' head coaching position by general manager Jack McCloskey, who gave the job to Chuck Daly instead when Robinson turned down the position. Robinson retired from the Pistons in 2003, and during the 2003-04 NBA season the Pistons named their locker room "Will Robinson Locker Room of Champions." The Pistons won their third NBA title that season.

Robinson died on April 28, 2008, at Henry Ford Hospital in Detroit at the age of 96. For the remainder of the 2008 NBA Playoffs, the Pistons uniforms wore a black patch in his memory.
