= 1990–91 Illinois State Redbirds men's basketball team =

American college basketball season

1990–91 Illinois State Redbirds men's basketball
- Conference: Missouri Valley Conference
- Record: 5–23 (4–12 MVC)
- Head coach: Bob Bender (2nd season)
- Assistant coaches: Jay Lowenthal; Billy King; Ray Giacoletti; Bob Morris; Eric Hughes
- Home arena: Redbird Arena

1990–91 Missouri Valley Conference men's basketball standings
	Conf.				Overall
Team	W		L	PCT	W		L	PCT
Creighton †	12	–	4	.750	24	–	8	.750
Southwest Missouri State	11	–	5	.688	22	–	12	.647
Tulsa	10	–	6	.625	18	–	12	.600
Indiana State	9	–	7	.563	14	–	14	.500
Southern Illinois	9	–	7	.563	18	–	14	.563
Wichita State	7	–	9	.438	14	–	17	.452
Bradley	6	–	10	.375	8	–	20	.286
Illinois State	4	–	12	.250	5	–	23	.179
Drake	4	–	12	.250	8	–	21	.276
† 1991 MVC tournament winner Rankings from AP Poll

The 1990–91 Illinois State Redbirds men's basketball team represented Illinois State University during the 1990–91 NCAA Division I men's basketball season. The Redbirds, led by second year head coach Bob Bender, played their home games at Redbird Arena and competed as a member of the Missouri Valley Conference.

They finished the season 5–23, 4–14 in conference play to finish in a tie for eighth place. They were the number eight seed for the Missouri Valley Conference tournament. They lost their opening round game to Drake University.

== Roster ==
1990–91 Illinois State Redbirds men's basketball team
Players
Coaches

Pos.	#	Name	Height	Weight	Year	Hometown
G	3	Sam Skarich	6 ft 5 in (1.96 m)	183 lb (83 kg)	RS Sr	St. Cloud, MN
C	22	Rick Bettenhausen	7 ft 0 in (2.13 m)	255 lb (116 kg)	Sr	Manhattan, IL
F	42	Scott Fowler (injured)	6 ft 5 in (1.96 m)	235 lb (107 kg)	RS Jr	Chicago, IL
G	33	Elvin Florez	6 ft 3 in (1.91 m)	178 lb (81 kg)	Jr	Chicago, IL
G	11	Antoine Hicks	5 ft 9 in (1.75 m)	162 lb (73 kg)	Jr	Chicago, IL
F	32	Xavier Williams	6 ft 6 in (1.98 m)	177 lb (80 kg)	Jr	Michigan City, IN
F	4	Reggie Wilson	6 ft 6 in (1.98 m)	228 lb (103 kg)	Jr	Chicago, IL
G	12	Todd Kagel	5 ft 11 in (1.8 m)	162 lb (73 kg)	So	Normal, IL
F	23	Kelly Martin (W)	6 ft 3 in (1.91 m)	195 lb (88 kg)	So	Chicago, IL
G	14	Richard Thomas	6 ft 0 in (1.83 m)	160 lb (73 kg)	So	Chicago, IL
F	54	Charles Barnes	6 ft 5 in (1.96 m)	180 lb (82 kg)	Fr	Chicago, IL
G	43	William Leach (W)	6 ft 3 in (1.91 m)	190 lb (86 kg)	Fr	Chicago, IL
F	21	Scott Taylor	6 ft 7 in (2.01 m)	215 lb (98 kg)	Fr	Newton, MA
F	41	Mike VandeGarde	6 ft 7 in (2.01 m)	190 lb (86 kg)	Fr	Bloomington, MN
G	34	Todd Wemhoener	6 ft 2 in (1.88 m)	175 lb (79 kg)	Fr	Quincy, IL

Head coach

- Bob Bender (Duke)

Assistant coach(es)

- Jay Lowenthal (Vanderbilt)
- Billy King (Duke)
- Ray Giacoletti (Minot State)
- Bob Morris (Western Illinois)
- Eric Hughes (Cal State East Bay)

Legend

- (C) Team captain
- (S) Suspended
- (I) Ineligible
- (W) Walk-on
- Injured
- Current redshirt

== Schedule ==
Date time, TV	Rank^{#}	Opponent^{#}	Result	Record	High points	High rebounds	High assists	Site (attendance) city, state
Exhibition Season
November 8, 1990*		Marathon Oil	W 101–92		19 – Fowler, Thomas	8 – Williams	–	Redbird Arena; Normal, IL
November 17, 1990*		Czechoslovakia	L 88–95 ^{OT}		21 – Wilson	11 – Wilson	–	Redbird Arena (8,542); Normal, IL
Regular Season
November 23, 1990*; 3:30 pm, ESPN		at Dayton	L 69–109	0–1	–	–	–	University of Dayton Arena (12,814); Dayton, OH
November 28, 1990*		Virginia Commonwealth	L 76–86	0–2	–	–	–	Redbird Arena (8,297); Normal, IL
December 4, 1990*		at Illinois–Chicago	L 65–75	0–3	–	–	–	UIC Pavilion (2,457); Chicago, IL
December 8, 1990*		at DePaul	L 78–96	0–4	–	–	–	Rosemont Horizon (13,521); Rosemont, IL
December 15, 1990*; 7:30 pm		at Saint Louis	L 67–71	0–5	–	–	–	Kiel Auditorium (7,443); St. Louis, MO
December 20, 1990; WEEK		Bradley	L 54–74	0–6 (0–1)	–	–	–	Redbird Arena (7,697); Normal, IL
December 23, 1990*		Kent State	L 53–69	0–7	–	–	–	Redbird Arena (7,068); Normal, IL
December 28, 1990*		vs. No. 14 Oklahoma; All-College Tournament [Semifinal]	L 69–112	0–8	–	–	–	Myriad Convention Center Arena (9,106); Oklahoma City, OK
December 29, 1990*		vs. Alabama–Birmingham; All-College Tournament [Third Place]	L 60–71	0–9	–	–	–	Myriad Convention Center Arena (9,187); Oklahoma City, OK
January 5, 1991		at Indiana State	L 70–75	0–10 (0–2)	–	–	–	Hulman Center (4,640); Terre Haute, IN
January 7, 1991*		Southern Utah	L 61–77	0–11	–	–	–	Redbird Arena (6,047); Normal, IL
January 12, 1991		at Southwest Missouri State	L 64–70	0–12 (0–3)	–	–	–	John Q. Hammons Student Center (8,243); Springfield, MO
January 14, 1991		Indiana State	W 56–55	1–12 (1–3)	–	–	–	Redbird Arena (8,968); Normal, IL
January 17, 1991		at Drake	W 57–55	2–12 (2–3)	–	–	–	Veterans Memorial Auditorium (4,365); Des Monies, IA
January 19, 1991; 2:00 pm, ESPN		Creighton	W 71–68	3–12 (3–3)	20 – Wilson	9 – VandeGarde	4 – Kagel, Wemhoener	Redbird Arena (9,698); Normal, IL
January 21, 1991*		Loyola–Chicago	L 69–73 ^{OT}	3–13	–	–	–	Redbird Arena (9,117); Normal, IL
January 26, 1991		Southwest Missouri State	L 46–58	3–14 (3–4)	–	–	–	Redbird Arena (9,059); Normal, IL
January 28, 1991		Wichita State	L 60–73	3–15 (3–5)	11 – Barnes, VandeGarde	11 – Wilson	4 – Kagel	Redbird Arena (8,714); Normal, IL
January 31, 1991		at Creighton	L 57–71	3–16 (3–6)	13 – Thomas	8 – Wilson	3 – Thomas	Omaha Civic Auditorium (5,155); Omaha, NE
February 2, 1991		Southern Illinois	L 57–84	3–17 (3–7)	27 – Wilson	6 – Wilson	3 – Kagel, Wemhoener	Redbird Arena (9,910); Normal, IL
February 7, 1991		at Tulsa	L 41–84	3–18 (3–8)	–	–	–	Tulsa Convention Center (4,836); Tulsa, OK
February 9, 1991		at Wichita State	W 78–57	4–18 (4–8)	18 – Taylor	6 – Wilson, Wemhoener	4 – Thomas	Henry Levitt Arena (7,685); Wichita, KS
February 12, 1991*		Chicago State; FORFEIT (Official Score 2-0)	W 39–23	5–18	12 – Wilson	–	–	Redbird Arena (9,283); Normal, IL
February 16, 1991		Drake	L 66–71	5–19 (4–9)	–	–	–	Redbird Arena (9,910); Normal, IL
February 18, 1991		at Southern Illinois	L 70–90	5–20 (4–10)	14 – Wilson	6 – VandeGarde	2 – Kagel, Thomas, Taylor, Wemhoener	SIU Arena (4,404); Carbondale, IL
February 21, 1991; WEEK		at Bradley	L 63–67	5–21 (4–11)	–	–	–	Carver Arena (7,603); Peoria, IL
February 25, 1991		Tulsa	L 46–53	5–22 (4–12)	–	–	–	Redbird Arena (9,492); Normal, IL
Pepsi Missouri Valley Conference {MVC} tournament
March 1, 1991*; 3:00 pm	(8)	(9) Drake; Opening Round	L 55–57	5–23	16 – Williams	7 – Taylor	2 – Thomas, Barnes, Wemhoener	Kiel Auditorium (1,400); St. Louis, MO
*Non-conference game. ^{#}Rankings from AP Poll. (#) Tournament seedings in parentheses. All times are in Central Standard Time.
