= Tarise Bryson =

American basketball player (born 1978)

Personal information
- Born: June 19, 1978 (age 48) Decatur, Illinois
- Listed height: 6 ft 1 in (1.85 m)
- Listed weight: 175 lb (79 kg)

Career information
- High school: Stephen Decatur (Decatur, Illinois)
- College: Illinois State (1998–2002)
- NBA draft: 2002: undrafted
- Position: Guard

Career highlights
- MVC Player of the Year (2001); AP Honorable Mention All-American (2001); 2x First-team All-MVC (2000, 2001)

Tarise Bryson (born June 19, 1978) is an American basketball player, best known for his All-American college career at Illinois State University.

Bryson, a 6'1" guard from Decatur, Illinois, came to Illinois State in 1997 but was declared academically ineligible for what would have been his freshman season. Returning to the court in the 1998–99 season, Bryson led the Redbirds in scoring at 15.5 points per game. As a sophomore and junior, Bryson also led the team in scoring and was named Missouri Valley Conference Player of the Year and an AP Honorable Mention All-American as a junior in 2000–01. That season he averaged 22.8 points per game, the fourth highest scoring average in the nation.

In the first game of his senior year, Bryson broke his wrist and was out for the year. After an NCAA eligibility investigation, he was denied a waiver for a sixth year.

Undrafted by the NBA, Bryson played professionally in Venezuela, in the United States Basketball League and briefly for the Harlem Globetrotters.
