= Doug Collins (basketball) =

American basketball player and coach (born 1951)

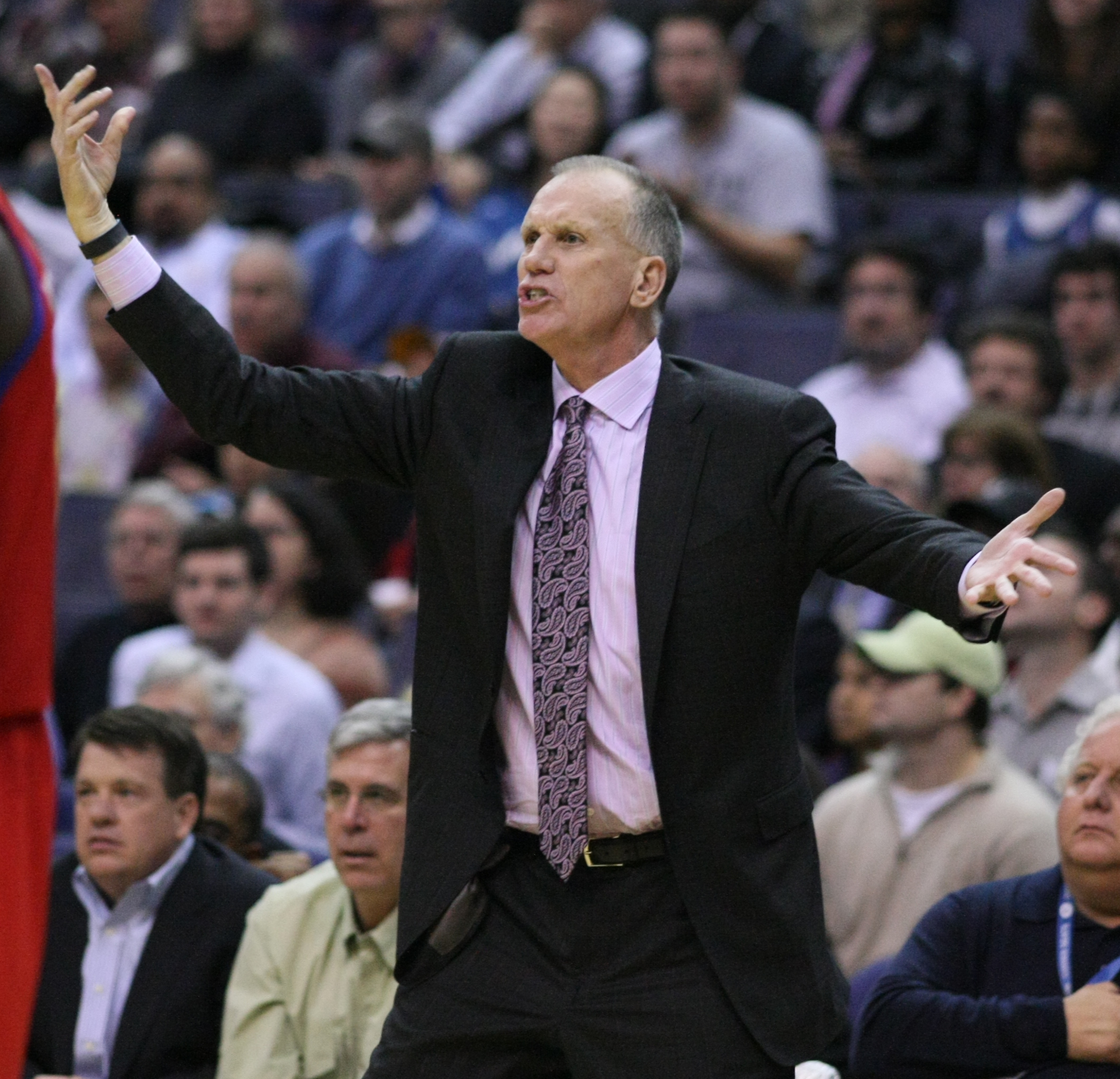
- Collins coaching the Philadelphia 76ers in 2010

Personal information
- Born: July 28, 1951 (age 75) Christopher, Illinois, U.S.
- Listed height: 6 ft 6 in (1.98 m)
- Listed weight: 180 lb (82 kg)

Career information
- High school: Benton (Benton, Illinois)
- College: Illinois State (1970–1973)
- NBA draft: 1973: 1st round, 1st overall pick
- Drafted by: Philadelphia 76ers
- Playing career: 1973–1981
- Position: Shooting guard
- Number: 20
- Coaching career: 1981–1989, 1995–2003, 2010–2013

Career history

Playing
- 1973–1981: Philadelphia 76ers

Coaching
- 1981–1982: Penn (assistant)
- 1982–1984: Arizona State (assistant)
- 1986–1989: Chicago Bulls
- 1995–1998: Detroit Pistons
- 2001–2003: Washington Wizards
- 2010–2013: Philadelphia 76ers

Career highlights
- As player: 4× NBA All-Star (1976–1979); Consensus first-team All-American (1973); AP honorable mention All-American (1972); 2× First-team All-Midwestern (1971, 1972); No. 20 retired by Illinois State Redbirds; As coach: NBA All-Star Game head coach (1997)

Career playing statistics
- Points: 7,427 (17.9 ppg)
- Rebounds: 1,339 (3.2 rpg)
- Assists: 1,368 (3.3 apg)
- Stats at NBA.com
- Stats at Basketball Reference

Career coaching record
- NBA: 442–407 (.521)
- Record at Basketball Reference
- Collegiate Basketball Hall of Fame
Medals
Men's basketball
Representing United States
Olympic Games
Silver medal – second place	1972 Munich	Team

Paul Douglas Collins (born July 28, 1951) is an American basketball executive, former player, coach and television analyst in the National Basketball Association (NBA). He played in the NBA from 1973 to 1981 for the Philadelphia 76ers, earning four NBA All-Star selections. He then became an NBA coach in 1986, and had stints coaching the Chicago Bulls, Detroit Pistons, Washington Wizards and Philadelphia 76ers. Collins also served as an analyst for various NBA-related broadcast shows. He is a recipient of the Curt Gowdy Media Award. In April 2024, Collins was elected to the Naismith Memorial Basketball Hall of Fame class of 2024 by the Contributors Committee.

== Early life ==
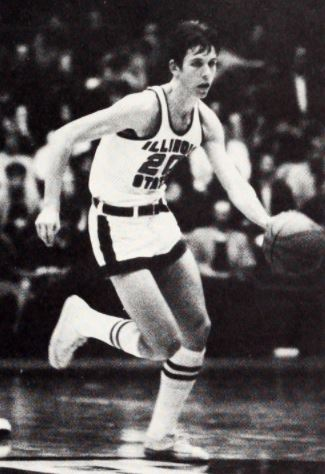
Collins as a sophomore at Illinois State

Collins was born in Christopher, Illinois. He grew up in Benton, Illinois, where his next-door neighbor was future film star John Malkovich. Collins enjoyed a successful high school basketball career at Benton Consolidated High School under coach Rich Herrin.

== College career ==
Collins went on to play for Illinois State University in Normal, Illinois, coached from 1970 by Will Robinson, the first black head coach in NCAA Division I.

== Professional career ==
=== Philadelphia 76ers (1973–1981) ===
Collins was drafted first overall in the 1973 NBA draft by the Philadelphia 76ers. He played eight seasons for Philadelphia, and was an NBA All-Star four times. In the 1976–77 season, he and Julius Erving led the Sixers to the NBA Finals, where they lost to the Portland Trail Blazers.

A series of injuries to his feet and left knee beginning in 1979 would end Collins' career in 1981. In all, he played 415 NBA games, scoring 7,427 points (17.9 per game).

== Coaching career ==
After his retirement, Collins turned to coaching. He joined Bob Weinhauer's staff at Penn as an assistant coach and later followed Weinhauer to Arizona State for the same job. He resigned from Arizona State on July 7, 1984, to become a CBS television commentator.

=== Chicago Bulls (1986–1989) ===
In May 1986, Collins was named head coach of the Chicago Bulls; the team featured a young Michael Jordan who was entering his third season. Despite having Jordan, the Bulls were coming off a 30–52 season and had fired their past two coaches after one season each.

Collins immediately helped the Bulls turn their fortunes around, showing an improvement of 10 games in each of his first two seasons, coaching Chicago to a 50–32 record in his second year. In his third year as coach, he brought Chicago to their first Eastern Conference finals appearance in 15 years; however, they were unable to get past their Central Division rival, the "Bad Boys" Detroit Pistons. Despite the Bulls' success and his popularity in Chicago, Collins was fired in the summer of 1989.

=== Detroit Pistons (1995–1998) ===
Collins was named the head coach of the Detroit Pistons in 1995. His results on arrival in Detroit were similar to those in Chicago, as the Pistons had a second-year star who drew comparisons to Michael Jordan, Grant Hill. In his first season, he was able to improve the team's previous season's record by 18 games and lead them back to the playoffs, though they would be swept by the Orlando Magic.

A fast start in his second season pushed Hill to the top of MVP consideration and Collins was named the Eastern Conference All-Star team's coach. The highlight of the year for Collins came on April 13, when the Pistons defeated the defending champion Bulls to end Detroit's 19-game losing streak against Chicago. (Incidentally Collins ended a Chicago losing streak against the Pistons in the 80's.) The Pistons finished 54–28 and lost in the first round of playoffs to the Atlanta Hawks, 3–2 in the best-of-five series.

Collins served as Pistons' head coach until February 2, 1998, when he was fired and replaced by Alvin Gentry. Collins then became a television broadcaster, working for many years at various networks, such as NBC on the NBA on NBC and TNT on the NBA on TNT.

=== Washington Wizards (2001–2003) ===
Collins worked as a broadcaster for about three years before being hired to coach the Washington Wizards for the start of the 2001–02 NBA season. In Washington, Collins was reunited with Michael Jordan and Charles Oakley. Once again, in his first season with his new team, Collins improved the team's previous season's record by 18 games. Though his .451 winning percentage through two seasons was better than the Wizards' .308 record the previous two seasons (and subsequent .305 record the following season), Collins was fired at the conclusion of the 2002–03 season.

=== Philadelphia 76ers (2010–2013) ===
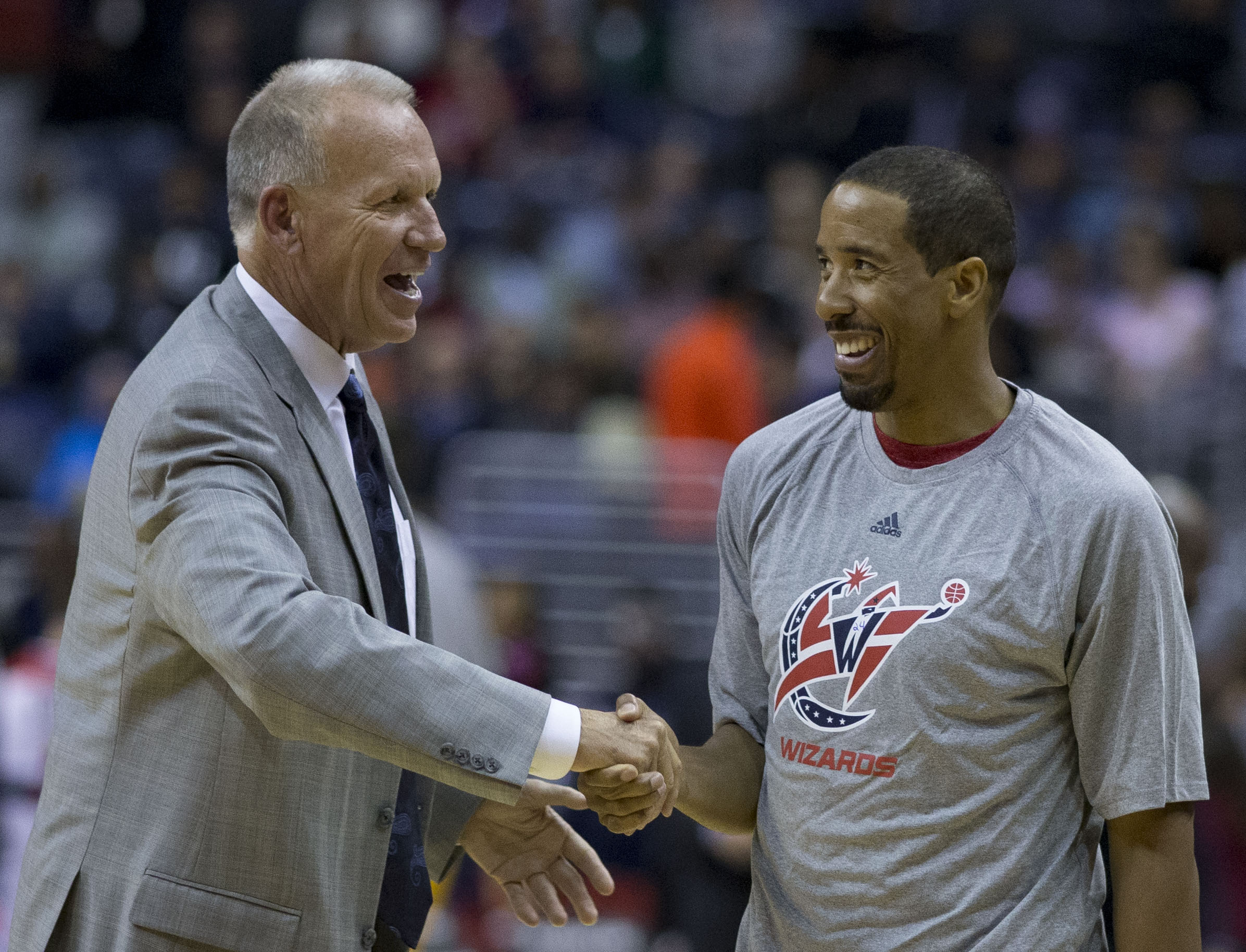
Collins speaks with Andre Miller in 2014

On May 21, 2010, Collins was hired as head coach of the Philadelphia 76ers. While the 76ers initially started out poorly with a record of 3–13, the team showed great improvement as the season went on, and clinched the seventh seed in the Eastern Conference for the playoffs. Under Collins, the team increased its win total by 14 games over the previous season. They lost to the eventual Eastern Conference champion Miami Heat in the first round, but were able to avoid a sweep that had been predicted. Collins finished second in Coach of the Year voting that season.

In the lockout-shortened 2011–2012 season, Collins led the Sixers to an improved record, but Philadelphia was only able to take the eighth seed in the playoffs. Against the top seeded Chicago Bulls, Collins led the Sixers to their first playoff series victory since 2003. It was the fifth time in NBA history that an eighth seed defeated a first seed in a playoff series. They took the next series against the Boston Celtics to seven games, but lost.

Collins resigned as 76ers coach on April 18, 2013, citing a need to spend more time with his five grandchildren. It was announced that he would stay with the team as an adviser.

== National team career ==
Collins represented the United States at the 1972 Summer Olympics in Munich, West Germany. Those basketball games are remembered mainly for the controversial gold medal basketball game between the United States and the Soviet Union, in which Collins played a key part. Despite being fouled hard by a Soviet player, he made the two go-ahead free throws that should have won the game. But the final three seconds of the game after the free throws were replayed three times for unclear reasons, which allowed the Soviets the opportunity to make the decisive shot. The game-altering event led to the US team boycotting the medal ceremony altogether and mutually deciding to never accept their medals.

In 2008, he was part of NBC Sports' TV coverage of basketball at the 2008 Summer Olympics in Beijing, which notably saw his son, Chris serve as the court coach and scout for the 2008 "Redeem Team". When the American team won, he was invited to join the team on the Gold Medal ceremony. He was part of the cast for Netflix's The Redeem Team in 2022.

== Broadcasting career ==
Collins started doing work for CBS in the mid-1980s, calling mostly playoff games. He also was the lead color analyst for the local broadcasts of the 76ers' games during the 1985–86 season. In-between his various coaching stints he has done broadcasting work for CBS, NBC, TNT, TBS, and ABC/ESPN. He also called games for the New York Knicks during the 2003–04 season on MSG Network on a part-time basis, paired with Marv Albert.

After being fired by the Wizards, Collins returned to announcing games for TNT. In addition, he served as an analyst for NBC Sports' TV coverage of basketball at the 2008 Summer Olympics in Beijing. He also was a basketball analyst for NBC during the 2012 Summer Olympics in London.

During this time, Collins's name surfaced several times regarding head coaching vacancies. In 2005, he was a candidate for the Milwaukee Bucks job but was passed over for Terry Stotts. Collins was approached by the team again in 2008 to serve as their GM and coach but turned them down again. In May 2008, Collins was in negotiations to coach the Chicago Bulls, nearly 20 years after he was fired from the team. However, Collins withdrew his name when he and owner Jerry Reinsdorf "agreed it wasn't the best to keep going this way," in light of their close personal friendship.

In 2026, Collins set to reunite with Bob Costas for NBA on NBC alongside with Mike Fratello and Jim Gray for the coverage of Philadelphia 76ers to face San Antonio Spurs on March 3.

== Executive career ==
=== Chicago Bulls (2017–present) ===
On September 19, 2017, the Chicago Bulls announced that Collins had joined the team as senior advisor of basketball operations.

== Personal life ==
Collins and his wife Kathy have two children. They reside in the Philadelphia metropolitan area. Their son Chris, a former Duke University basketball player, is the head basketball coach at Northwestern University and their daughter Kelly, who played basketball at Lehigh University, is a school teacher in Pennsylvania.

== Awards and honors ==
Illinois State University's basketball court is named after Collins (Doug Collins Court at Redbird Arena). A statue depicting Collins and his ISU coach, Will Robinson, was unveiled on September 19, 2009, outside the north entrance of Redbird Arena.

Collins was inducted as a Laureate of The Lincoln Academy of Illinois and awarded the Order of Lincoln (the State's highest honor) by the Governor of Illinois on June 19, 2021.

== Career statistics ==
Legend
GP	Games played	GS	Games started	MPG	Minutes per game
FG%	Field goal percentage	3P%	3-point field goal percentage	FT%	Free throw percentage
RPG	Rebounds per game	APG	Assists per game	SPG	Steals per game
BPG	Blocks per game	PPG	Points per game	**Bold**	Career high

=== College ===
Year	Team	GP	GS	MPG	FG%	3P%	FT%	RPG	APG	SPG	BPG	PPG
1971–72	Illinois State	26	—	—	.500	—	.808	5.1	—	—	—	32.6
1972–73	Illinois State	25	—	—	.476	—	.818	5.0	—	—	—	26.0
Career		51	—	—	.489	—	.812	5.1	—	—	—	29.4

=== NBA ===
==== Regular season ====
Year	Team	GP	GS	MPG	FG%	3P%	FT%	RPG	APG	SPG	BPG	PPG
1973–74	Philadelphia	25	—	17.4	.371	—	.764	1.8	1.6	.5	.1	8.0
1974–75	Philadelphia	**81**	—	34.8	.488	—	.844	3.9	2.6	1.3	.2	17.9
1975–76	Philadelphia	77	—	**38.9**	.513	—	.836	**4.0**	2.5	1.4	.3	**20.8**
1976–77	Philadelphia	58	—	35.1	.518	—	.840	3.4	**4.7**	1.2	.3	18.3
1977–78	Philadelphia	79	—	35.1	**.526**	—	.812	2.9	4.1	**1.6**	.3	19.7
1978–79	Philadelphia	47	—	33.9	.499	—	.814	2.6	4.1	1.1	**.4**	19.5
1979–80	Philadelphia	36	—	26.8	.466	.000	**.911**	2.6	2.8	.8	.2	13.8
1980–81	Philadelphia	12	—	27.4	.492	—	.828	2.4	3.5	.6	.3	12.3
Career		415	—	33.6	.501	.000	.833	3.2	3.3	1.2	.3	17.9
All-Star		3	1	22.7	.458	—	.800	4.3	5.7	2.0	.0	11.3

==== Playoffs ====
Year	Team	GP	GS	MPG	FG%	3P%	FT%	RPG	APG	SPG	BPG	PPG
1976	Philadelphia	3	—	39.0	.434	—	**.857**	**7.0**	3.3	1.0	**.3**	19.3
1977	Philadelphia	**19**	—	**39.9**	**.557**	—	.740	4.2	**3.9**	**1.5**	.2	**22.4**
1978	Philadelphia	10	—	34.2	.497	—	.816	3.1	2.7	.3	.0	20.4
Career		32	—	38.1	.526	—	.855	4.1	3.5	1.1	.1	21.5

== Head coaching record ==
Legend
Regular season	G	Games coached	W	Games won	L	Games lost	W–L %	Win–loss %
Playoffs	PG	Playoff games	PW	Playoff wins	PL	Playoff losses	PW–L %	Playoff win–loss %

Team	Year	G	W	L	W–L%	Finish	PG	PW	PL	PW–L%	Result
Chicago	1986–87	82	40	42	.488	5th in Central	3	0	3	.000	Lost in First round
Chicago	1987–88	82	50	32	.610	2nd in Central	10	4	6	.400	Lost in Conference semifinals
Chicago	1988–89	82	47	35	.573	5th in Central	17	9	8	.529	Lost in Conference finals
Detroit	1995–96	82	46	36	.561	4th in Central	3	0	3	.000	Lost in First round
Detroit	1996–97	82	54	28	.659	3rd in Central	5	2	3	.400	Lost in First round
Detroit	1997–98	45	21	24	.467	(fired)	—	—	—	—	—
Washington	2001–02	82	37	45	.451	5th in Atlantic	—	—	—	—	Missed playoffs
Washington	2002–03	82	37	45	.451	5th in Atlantic	—	—	—	—	Missed playoffs
Philadelphia	2010–11	82	41	41	.500	3rd in Atlantic	5	1	4	.200	Lost in First round
Philadelphia	2011–12	66	35	31	.530	3rd in Atlantic	13	7	6	.538	Lost in Conference semifinals
Philadelphia	2012–13	82	34	48	.415	4th in Atlantic	—	—	—	—	Missed playoffs
Career		849	442	407	.521		56	23	33	.411	
