= Jeff Wilkins (basketball) =

American basketball player (born 1955)

Personal information
- Born: March 9, 1955 (age 71) Chicago, Illinois, U.S.
- Listed height: 6 ft 11 in (2.11 m)
- Listed weight: 230 lb (104 kg)

Career information
- High school: Hales Franciscan (Chicago, Illinois); Elgin (Elgin, Illinois)
- College: Black Hawk (1973–1974); Illinois State (1974–1977)
- NBA draft: 1977: 2nd round, 37th overall pick
- Drafted by: San Antonio Spurs
- Playing career: 1977–1993
- Position: Center
- Number: 53, 45

Career history
- 1977–1978: Mobiam Udine
- 1978–1979: Efes Pilsen
- 1979–1980: Hawaii Volcanos
- 1980: Galleon Shippers
- 1980–1986: Utah Jazz
- 1986: San Antonio Spurs
- 1986–1987: Olympique Antibes
- 1987: Montigoma Rieti
- 1989–1990: Etoile de Voiron
- 1992–1993: Le Mans

Career highlights
- All-CBA Second Team (1980); Fourth-team Parade All-American (1973)

Career NBA statistics
- Points: 3,575 (7.9 ppg)
- Rebounds: 2,574 (5.7 rpg)
- Assists: 462 (1.0 apg)
- Stats at NBA.com
- Stats at Basketball Reference

Jeffrey Wilkins (born March 9, 1955) is an American former professional basketball player who played in the National Basketball Association (NBA) and other leagues. A 6'11" 230 lb center born in Chicago, Illinois, Wilkins played college basketball for the Illinois State Redbirds and was selected in the second round of the 1977 NBA draft by the San Antonio Spurs.

He signed with the Spurs in July 1977 but was waived prior to the start of the 1977–78 NBA season. Wilkins played for the Hawaii Volcanos of the Continental Basketball Association (CBA) during the 1979–80 season and was selected to the All-CBA Second Team. He began his NBA playing career in 1980 with the Utah Jazz and spent the majority of it with them, but due to a mid-season trade played out part of his final year with the Spurs in 1986.

He holds career NBA averages of 7.9 points, 5.7 rebounds and 1.0 assist per game. Wilkins also won a Turkish Basketball League championship with Efes Pilsen.

== Personal ==
Wilkins' son John is a professional basketball player as well, and has played for several teams in Africa and Europe. Jeffrey also has a younger son named Johnathon who played for New Mexico State as well as professional ball in France.

== Career statistics ==
Legend
GP	Games played	GS	Games started	MPG	Minutes per game
FG%	Field goal percentage	3P%	3-point field goal percentage	FT%	Free throw percentage
RPG	Rebounds per game	APG	Assists per game	SPG	Steals per game
BPG	Blocks per game	PPG	Points per game	**Bold**	Career high

=== NBA ===
==== Regular season ====
Year	Team	GP	GS	MPG	FG%	3P%	FT%	RPG	APG	SPG	BPG	PPG
1980–81	Utah	56		18.9	.450	–	.675	4.9	.7	**.6**	.8	4.7
1981–82	Utah	**82**	**62**	27.7	.437	.000	.778	**7.5**	1.1	.4	**.9**	9.3
1982–83	Utah	81	34	**28.5**	.477	.000	**.780**	7.4	**1.6**	.5	.5	**11.5**
1983–84	Utah	81	1	21.4	.479	.000	.736	5.6	.9	.3	.5	7.8
1984–85	Utah	79	0	19.1	**.490**	.000	.763	4.6	1.0	.4	.2	8.0
1985–86	Utah	48	0	12.6	.400	–	.638	3.0	.6	.1	.2	4.6
1985–86	San Antonio	27	4	19.3	.381	–	.609	4.7	.7	.3	.4	4.8
Career		454	101	22.0	.459	.000	.743	5.7	1.0	.4	.5	7.9

==== Playoffs ====
Year	Team	GP	GS	MPG	FG%	3P%	FT%	RPG	APG	SPG	BPG	PPG
1984	Utah	**11**		18.6	**.526**	–	**.773**	4.5	.5	.0	.5	7.0
1985	Utah	10	0	**25.7**	.432	.000	.771	**6.3**	**1.3**	**.4**	.5	**12.9**
1986	San Antonio	3	0	5.3	.000	–	–	1.0	.0	.0	**.7**	.0
Career		24	0	19.9	.460	.000	.772	4.8	.8	.2	.5	8.6
