= Illinois State Redbirds men's basketball =

Collegiate basketball team

2025-26 Illinois State Redbirds men's basketball team
- University: Illinois State University
- Head coach: Ryan Pedon (4th season)
- Location: Normal, Illinois
- Arena: CEFCU Arena (capacity: 10,200)
- Conference: Missouri Valley Conference
- Nickname: Redbirds
- Colors: Red and white
- All-time record: 985–726 (.576)

NCAA Division I tournament Final Four
- 1967*
Other NCAA Division I tournament results
Elite Eight	1967*, 1969*
Sweet Sixteen	1967*, 1968*, 1969*
Appearances	1957*, 1962*, 1967*, 1968*, 1969*, 1983, 1984, 1985, 1990, 1997, 1998

Conference tournament champions
- 1983, 1990, 1997, 1998

Conference regular-season champions
- 1930*, 1931*, 1932*, 1935*, 1936*, 1941*, 1942*, 1943*, 1984, 1992, 1993, 1997, 1998, 2017

Uniforms
Home	Away
- * at Division II level

The Illinois State Redbirds men's basketball team represents Illinois State University, located in Normal, Illinois, in NCAA Division I basketball competition. They are currently led by head coach Ryan Pedon and play their home games at CEFCU Arena as a member of the Missouri Valley Conference. They had the distinction of earning the most National Invitation Tournament berths (14) without making the semifinals, and also have the longest current NCAA tournament drought (27 seasons) among Missouri Valley Conference members. The Redbirds have appeared in the NCAA tournament six times, most recently in 1998.

In 2017, Redbirds guard Paris Lee was named both the MVC Player of the Year and the MVC Defensive Player of the Year, becoming the third player in league history to win both honors.

== Season-by-season records ==
=== NCAA Division I ===
Record table
Season	Team	Overall	Conference	Standing	Postseason
Will Robinson (Conference of Midwestern Universities) (1970–1972)
1970–71	First	16–10	3–5	4th	
1971–72	Second	16–10	6–2	2nd	
Will Robinson (Independent) (1972–1975)
1972–73	Third	13–12			
1973–74	Fourth	17–9			
1974–75	Fifth	16–10			
Will Robinson:		78–51 (.602)	9–7 (.563)		
Gene Smithson (Independent) (1975–1978)
1975–76	First	20–7			
1976–77	Second	22–7			NIT Quarterfinal
1977–78	Third	24–4			NIT First Round
Gene Smithson:		66–18 (.786)			
Bob Donewald (Independent) (1978–1981)
1978–79	First	20–10			
1979–80	Second	20–9			NIT Second Round
1980–81	Third	16–11			
Bob Donewald (Missouri Valley Conference) (1981–1989)
1981–82	Fourth	17–12	9–7	5th	
1982–83	Fifth	24–7	13–5	2nd	NCAA First Round
1983–84	Sixth	23–8	13–3	T–1st	NCAA Second Round
1984–85	Seventh	22–8	11–5	T–2nd	NCAA Second Round
1985–86	Eighth	15–14	9–7	4th	
1986–87	Ninth	19–13	7–7	4th	NIT Quarterfinal
1987–88	Tenth	18–13	9–5	3rd	NIT First Round
1988–89	Eleventh	13–17	6–8	T–5th	
Bob Donewald:		207–122 (.629)	77–47 (.621)		
Bob Bender (Missouri Valley Conference) (1989–1993)
1989–90	First	18–13	9–5	T–2nd	NCAA First Round
1990–91	Second	5–23	4–12	T–8th	
1991–92	Third	18–11	14–4	T–1st	
1992–93	Fourth	19–10	13–5	1st	
Bob Bender:		60–57 (.513)	40–26 (.606)		
Kevin Stallings (Missouri Valley Conference) (1993–1999)
1993–94	First	16–11	12–6	4th	
1994–95	Second	20–13	13–5	T–2nd	NIT Second Round
1995–96	Third	22–12	13–5	2nd	NIT Quarterfinal
1996–97	Fourth	24–6	14–4	1st	NCAA First Round
1997–98	Fifth	25–6	16–2	1st	NCAA Second Round
1998–99	Sixth	16–15	7–11	7th	
Kevin Stallings:		123–63 (.661)	75–33 (.694)		
Tom Richardson (Missouri Valley Conference) (1999–2003)
1999–2000	First	10–20	5–13	T–8th	
2000–01	Second	21–9	12–6	T–2nd	NIT First Round
2001–02	Third	17–14	12–6	3rd	
2002–03	Fourth	8–21	5–13	10th	
Tom Richardson:		56–64 (.467)	34–38 (.472)		
Porter Moser (Missouri Valley Conference) (2003–2007)
2003–04	First	10–19	4–14	10th	
2004–05	Second	17–13	8–10	6th	
2005–06	Third	9–19	4–14	T–9th	
2006–07	Fourth	15–16	6–12	T–7th	
Porter Moser:		51–67 (.432)	22–50 (.306)		
Tim Jankovich (Missouri Valley Conference) (2007–2012)
2007–08	First	25–10	13–5	2nd	NIT Second Round
2008–09	Second	24–10	11–7	3rd	NIT First Round
2009–10	Third	22–11	11–7	3rd	NIT First Round
2010–11	Fourth	12–19	4–14	T–9th	
2011–12	Fifth	21–14	9–9	T–3rd	NIT Second Round
Tim Jankovich:		104–64 (.619)	48–42 (.533)		
Dan Muller (Missouri Valley Conference) (2012–2022)
2012–13	First	18–15	8–10	6th	
2013–14	Second	18–16	9–9	T–4th	CBI Semifinal
2014–15	Third	22–13	11–7	T–3rd	NIT Second Round
2015–16	Fourth	18–14	12–6	T–2nd	
2016–17	Fifth	28–7	17–1	T–1st	NIT Second Round
2017–18	Sixth	18–15	10–8	3rd	
2018–19	Seventh	17–16	9–9	7th	
2019–20	Eighth	10–21	5–13	9th	
2020–21	Ninth	7–18	4–14	10th	
2021–22	Tenth	11–15	4–9		
Dan Muller:		167–150 (.527)	89–86 (.509)		
Brian Jones (Missouri Valley Conference) (2022–2022)
2022	Interim	2–5	1–4		
Brian Jones:		2–5 (.286)	1–4 (.200)		
2021–22		13–20	5–13	8th	
Ryan Pedon (Missouri Valley Conference) (2022–present)
2022–23	First	11–21	6–14	9th	
2023–24	Second	15–16	9–11	T–7th	
2024–25	Third	22–14	10–10	T–5th	CBI Champion
2025–26	Fourth	23–13	12–8	T–3rd	NIT Semifinal
Ryan Pedon:		71–65 (.522)	37–43 (.463)		
Total:		985–726 (.576)	432–376 (.535)		
National champion Postseason invitational champion Conference regular season champion Conference regular season and conference tournament champion Division regular season champion Division regular season and conference tournament champion Conference tournament champion

== Postseason ==
=== NCAA Division I ===
The Redbirds have appeared in six NCAA Tournaments. Their combined record is 3–6.

Year	Seed	Round	Opponent	Result
1983	#6	First Round	vs. #11 Ohio	L 49–51
1984	#8	First Round; Second Round	vs. #9 Alabama vs. #1 DePaul	W 49–48; L 61–75
1985	#9	First Round; Second Round	vs. #8 USC vs. #1 Oklahoma	W 58–55; L 69–75
1990	#14	First Round	vs. #3 Michigan	L 70–76
1997	#11	First Round	vs. #6 Iowa State	L 57–69
1998	#9	First Round; Second Round	vs. #8 Tennessee vs. #1 Arizona	W 82–81 ^{OT} L 49–82

=== NCAA Division II ===
Illinois State made the NCAA Division II men's basketball tournament five times and had a combined record of 6–7.

Year	Round	Opponent	Result
1957	Round of 32	Evansville	L 96–108
1962	Regional Semifinal; Region Third Place	Concordia (IL); Kentucky State	L 61–79; L 72–77
1967	Regional Semifinal; Regional Final; Elite Eight; Final Four; National Third Place	Parsons; Louisiana Tech; San Diego State; Southwest Missouri State; Kentucky Wesleyan	W 72–68; W 89–66; W 77–76 ^{2OT} L 76–93; L 73–112
1968	Regional Semifinal; Regional Final	DePauw; Indiana State	W 83–81; L 93–98
1969	Regional Semifinal; Regional Final; Elite Eight	North Park; Valparaiso; Ashland	W 87–82; W 103–87; L 35–41

=== NIT results ===
The Redbirds have appeared in fifteen National Invitation Tournaments (NIT). Their combined record is 14–15.

Year	Bid	Regional	Seed	Round	Opponent	Result
1977				Regional Round; Quarterfinal	at Creighton vs. Houston	W 65–58; L 90–91
1978				First Round	at Indiana State	L 71–73
1980				First Round; Second Round	West Texas State at Illinois	W 80–63; L 65–75
1987				First Round; Second Round; Quarterfinal	Akron at Cleveland State at La Salle	W 79–72; W 79–77; L 50–70
1988				First Round	at Cleveland State	L 83–89
1995				First Round; Second Round	Utah State; Washington State	W 93–87; L 80–83
1996				First Round; Second Round; Quarterfinal	Mount St. Mary's at Wisconsin at Tulane	W 73–49; W 77–62; L 72–83
2001				First Round	at Purdue	L 79–90
2008	At-large	Ohio State	(2)	First Round; Second Round	(7) Utah State (3) Dayton	W 61–57; L 48–55
2009	At-large	San Diego State	(5)	First Round	at (4) Kansas State	L 79–83 ^{OT}
2010	At-large	Illinois	(6)	First Round	at (3) Dayton	L 42–63
2012	At-large	Arizona	(7)	First Round; Second Round	at (2) Ole Miss at (3) Stanford	W 96–93 ^{OT} L 88–92 ^{OT}
2015	At-large	Old Dominion	(4)	First Round; Second Round	(5) Green Bay at (1) Old Dominion	W 69–56; L 49–50
2017	Automatic	Illinois State	(1)	First Round; Second Round	(8) UC Irvine (4) UCF	W 85–71; L 62–63
2026	Exempt	Winston-Salem	(4)	First Round; Second Round; Quarterfinal; Semifinal	Kent State at (1) Wake Forest at (2) Dayton vs. (1) Auburn	W 79–58; W 78–75; W 61–55; L 66–88

=== CBI results ===
The Redbirds have appeared in the College Basketball Invitational (CBI) twice. Their combined record is 5–1. They turned down a bid in the 2015–16 season and again in the 2017–18 season. They were the 2025 champion.

Year	Round	Opponent	Result
2014	First Round; Quarterfinal; Semifinal	Morehead State; Texas A&M at Siena	W 77–67; W 62–55; L 49–61
2025	First Round; Semifinal; Final	vs. Presbyterian vs. Incarnate Word vs. Cleveland State	W 78–70; W 78–73; W 79–68

== Players ==
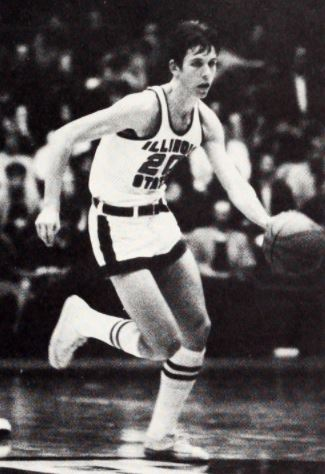
Doug Collins is the only Redbird whose number has been retired.

=== Retired numbers ===
Illinois State has retired only one number in program history, that of first-team All-American and Olympian Doug Collins.

Illinois State Redbirds retired numbers
No.	Player	Career	Ref.
20	Doug Collins	1970–1973	

=== Redbirds drafted into the NBA ===
Draft Year	Player	Position	Round	Overall	NBA Team
1973	Doug Collins	SG	1	1	Philadelphia 76ers
1975	Robert Hawkins	SF	3	51	Golden State Warriors
1977	Jeff Wilkins	C	2	37	San Antonio Spurs
1999	Rico Hill	SF	2	31	Los Angeles Clippers

== Redbirds in international leagues ==
- Zach Lofton (born 1992)
- DeVaughn Akoon-Purcell (born 1993), for the Jilin Northeast Tigers of the Chinese Basketball Association
- Nick Banyard (born 1994), for Darkhan United of The League
- Kaza Kajami-Keane (born 1994)
- Reggie Lynch (born 1994), for Bnei Herzliya of the Israeli Basketball Premier League
- Paris Lee (born 1995), for Ironi Ness Ziona of the Israeli Basketball Premier League
- Elijah Clarance (born 1998)

== Rivalries ==
The I-74 Rivalry is the rivalry between Illinois State and Bradley.

== Plane crash ==
On April 7, 2015, while flying home from the NCAA Tournament Final game in Indianapolis, a plane carrying Illinois State assistant coach Torrey Ward and six others crashed just outside Bloomington, Illinois, leaving no survivors.
