= 2015 NCAA Men's Basketball All-Americans =

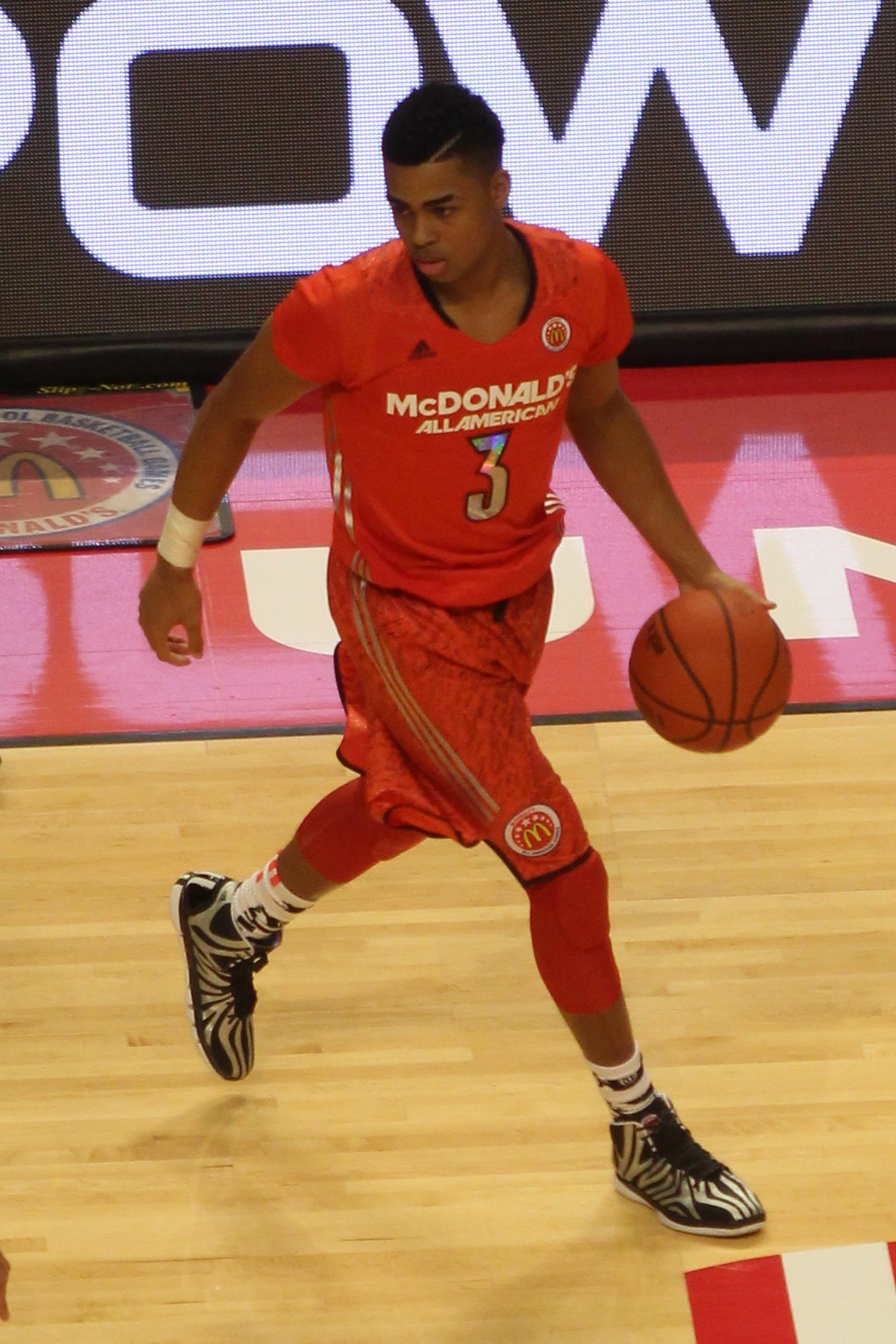
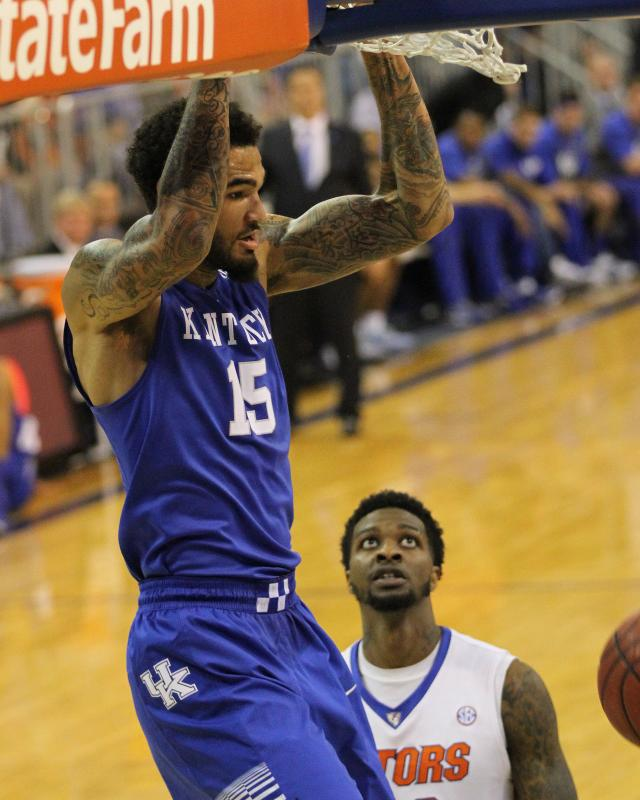
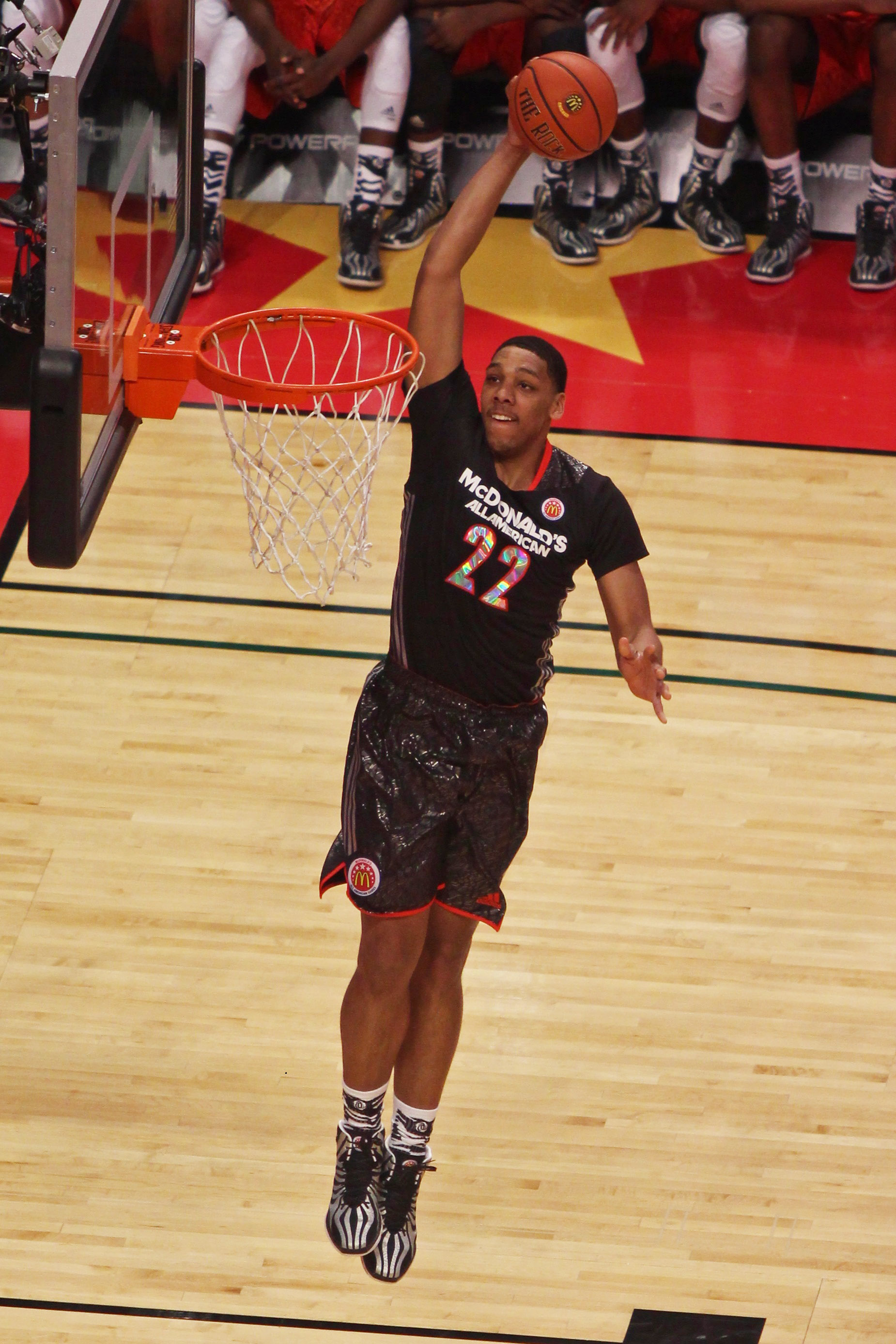
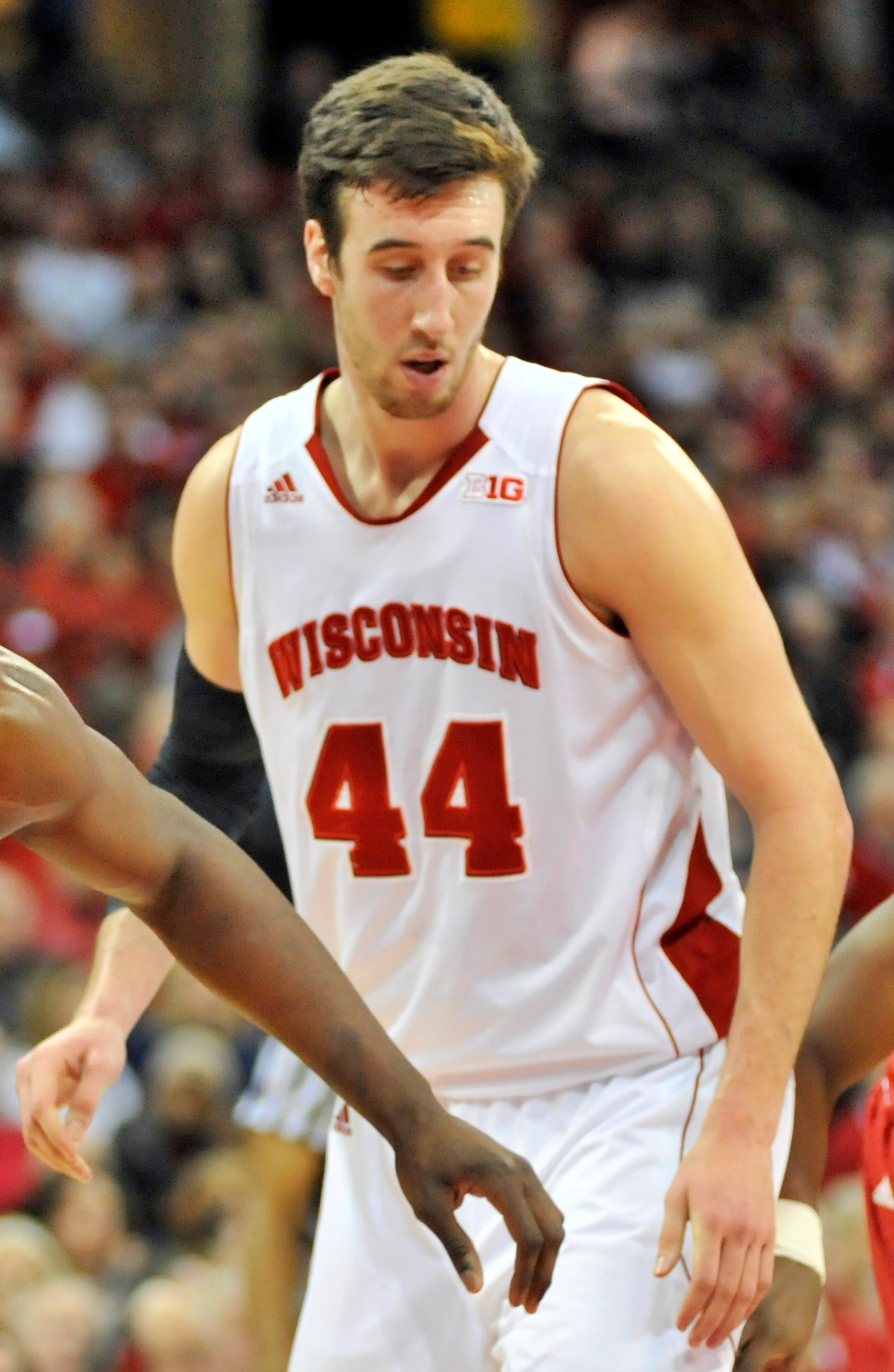
- The 2015 consensus first team. Clockwise from top left: Russell, Cauley-Stein, Kaminsky, and Okafor (not pictured: Grant).
- Awarded for: 2014–15 NCAA Division I men's basketball season

An All-American team is an honorary sports team composed of the best amateur players of a specific season for each team position—who in turn are given the honorific "All-America" and typically referred to as "All-American athletes", or simply "All-Americans". Although the honorees generally do not compete together as a unit, the term is used in U.S. team sports to refer to players who are selected by members of the national media. Walter Camp selected the first All-America team in the early days of American football in 1889. The 2015 NCAA Men's Basketball All-Americans are honorary lists that include All-American selections from the Associated Press (AP), the United States Basketball Writers Association (USBWA), the Sporting News (TSN), and the National Association of Basketball Coaches (NABC) for the 2014–15 NCAA Division I men's basketball season. All selectors choose at least a first and second 5-man team. The NABC, TSN and AP choose third teams, while AP also lists honorable mention selections.

The Consensus 2015 College Basketball All-American team is determined by aggregating the results of the four major All-American teams as determined by the National Collegiate Athletic Association (NCAA). Since United Press International was replaced by TSN in 1997, the four major selectors have been the aforementioned ones. AP has been a selector since 1948, NABC since 1957 and USBWA since 1960. To earn "consensus" status, a player must win honors based on a point system computed from the four different all-America teams. The point system consists of three points for first team, two points for second team and one point for third team. No honorable mention or fourth team or lower are used in the computation. The top five totals plus ties are first team and the next five plus ties are second team.

Although the aforementioned lists are used to determine consensus honors, there are numerous other All-American lists. The ten finalists for the John Wooden Award are described as Wooden All-Americans. The ten finalists for the Senior CLASS Award are described as Senior All-Americans. Other All-American lists include those determined by USA Today, Fox Sports, and Yahoo! Sports. The scholar-athletes selected by College Sports Information Directors of America (CoSIDA) are termed Academic All-Americans.

== 2015 Consensus All-America team ==
PG – Point guard
SG – Shooting guard
PF – Power forward
SF – Small forward
C – Center

Consensus First Team
| Player | Position | Class | Team |
|---|---|---|---|
| Willie Cauley-Stein | PF | Junior | Kentucky |
| Jerian Grant | PG/SG | Senior | Notre Dame |
| Frank Kaminsky | C/PF | Senior | Wisconsin |
| Jahlil Okafor | C | Freshman | Duke |
| D'Angelo Russell | PG/SG | Freshman | Ohio State |

Consensus Second Team
| Player | Position | Class | Team |
|---|---|---|---|
| Malcolm Brogdon | SG | Junior | Virginia |
| Bobby Portis | PF | Sophomore | Arkansas |
| Karl-Anthony Towns | C | Freshman | Kentucky |
| Seth Tuttle | PF | Senior | Northern Iowa |
| Kyle Wiltjer | PF | Junior | Gonzaga |
| Delon Wright | SG/PG | Senior | Utah |

== Individual All-America teams ==
| Player | School | AP | USBWA | NABC | TSN | CP | Notes |
|---|---|---|---|---|---|---|---|
| Willie Cauley-Stein | Kentucky | 1 | 1 | 1 | 1 | 12 | |
| Frank Kaminsky | Wisconsin | 1 | 1 | 1 | 1 | 12 | |
| Jahlil Okafor | Duke | 1 | 1 | 1 | 1 | 12 | |
| D'Angelo Russell | Ohio State | 1 | 1 | 1 | 1 | 12 | |
| Jerian Grant | Notre Dame | 1 | 1 | 1 | 2 | 11 | |
| Delon Wright | Utah | 2 | 2 | 2 | 1 | 9 | |
| Seth Tuttle | Northern Iowa | 2 | 2 | 2 | 2 | 8 | |
| Malcolm Brogdon | Virginia | 2 | 2 | 2 | | 6 | |
| Bobby Portis | Arkansas | 2 | 2 | | 3 | 5 | |
| Karl-Anthony Towns | Kentucky | 2 | | 2 | 3 | 5 | |
| Kyle Wiltjer | Gonzaga | 3 | 2 | 2 | | 5 | |
| Kevin Pangos | Gonzaga | 3 | | 3 | 3 | 3 | |
| Rakeem Christmas | Syracuse | 3 | | | 3 | 2 | |
| Quinn Cook | Duke | | | | 2 | 2 | |
| Buddy Hield | Oklahoma | 3 | | 3 | | 2 | |
| Darrun Hilliard | Villanova | | | | 2 | 2 | |
| Georges Niang | Iowa State | 3 | | 3 | | 2 | |
| Melo Trimble | Maryland | | | | 2 | 2 | |
| Justin Anderson | Virginia | | | 3 | | 1 | |
| Stanley Johnson | Arizona | | | 3 | | 1 | |
| Joe Young | Oregon | | | | 3 | 1 | |

=== By team ===
All-America Team
| All-America Team | First team | | Second team | | Third team | |
| All-America Team | Player | School | Player | School | Player | School |
|---|---|---|---|---|---|---|
| Associated Press | Willie Cauley-Stein | Kentucky | Malcolm Brogdon | Virginia | Rakeem Christmas | Syracuse |
| Associated Press | Jerian Grant | Notre Dame | Bobby Portis | Arkansas | Buddy Hield | Oklahoma |
| Associated Press | Frank Kaminsky | Wisconsin | Karl-Anthony Towns | Kentucky | Georges Niang | Iowa State |
| Associated Press | Jahlil Okafor | Duke | Seth Tuttle | Northern Iowa | Kevin Pangos | Gonzaga |
| Associated Press | D'Angelo Russell | Ohio State | Delon Wright | Utah | Kyle Wiltjer | Gonzaga |
| USBWA | Willie Cauley-Stein | Kentucky | Malcolm Brogdon | Virginia | No third team | |
| USBWA | Jerian Grant | Notre Dame | Bobby Portis | Arkansas | No third team | |
| USBWA | Frank Kaminsky | Wisconsin | Seth Tuttle | Northern Iowa | No third team | |
| USBWA | Jahlil Okafor | Duke | Kyle Wiltjer | Gonzaga | No third team | |
| USBWA | D'Angelo Russell | Ohio State | Delon Wright | Utah | No third team | |
| NABC | Willie Cauley-Stein | Kentucky | Malcolm Brogdon | Virginia | Justin Anderson | Virginia |
| NABC | Jerian Grant | Notre Dame | Karl-Anthony Towns | Kentucky | Buddy Hield | Oklahoma |
| NABC | Frank Kaminsky | Wisconsin | Seth Tuttle | Northern Iowa | Stanley Johnson | Arizona |
| NABC | Jahil Okafor | Duke | Kyle Wiltjer | Gonzaga | Georges Niang | Iowa State |
| NABC | D'Angelo Russell | Ohio State | Delon Wright | Utah | Kevin Pangos | Gonzaga |
| Sporting News | Willie Cauley-Stein | Kentucky | Quinn Cook | Duke | Rakeem Christmas | Syracuse |
| Sporting News | Frank Kaminsky | Wisconsin | Jerian Grant | Notre Dame | Kevin Pangos | Gonzaga |
| Sporting News | Jahlil Okafor | Duke | Darrun Hilliard | Villanova | Bobby Portis | Arkansas |
| Sporting News | D'Angelo Russell | Ohio State | Melo Trimble | Maryland | Karl-Anthony Towns | Kentucky |
| Sporting News | Delon Wright | Utah | Seth Tuttle | Northern Iowa | Joe Young | Oregon |

AP Honorable Mention:

- Lawrence Alexander, North Dakota State
- Justin Anderson, Virginia
- Ryan Arcidiacono, Villanova
- Ron Baker, Wichita State
- Jalen Cannon, St. Francis Brooklyn
- Karl Cochran, Wofford
- Kyle Collinsworth, BYU
- Quinn Cook, Duke
- Kris Dunn, Providence
- Perry Ellis, Kansas
- Rico Gathers, Baylor
- Madarious Gibbs, Texas Southern
- Anthony Gill, Virginia
- Kendall Gray, Delaware State
- Ty Greene, USC Upstate
- Olivier Hanlan, Boston College
- Montrezl Harrell, Louisville
- Martez Harrison, UMKC
- Tyler Harvey, Eastern Washington
- Corey Hawkins, UC Davis
- Tyler Haws, BYU
- LaDontae Henton, Providence
- Darrun Hilliard, Villanova
- R. J. Hunter, Georgia State
- Stanley Johnson, Arizona
- Tyus Jones, Duke
- Tyler Kalinoski, Davidson
- Tim Kempton Jr., Lehigh
- David Laury, Iona
- Damon Lynn, NJIT
- Derrick Marks, Boise State
- Jarell Martin, LSU
- T. J. McConnell, Arizona
- Mikh McKinney, Sacramento State
- Nic Moore, SMU
- Justin Moss, Buffalo
- Saah Nimley, Charleston Southern
- Cameron Payne, Murray State
- Chasson Randle, Stanford
- Justin Sears, Yale
- Speedy Smith, Louisiana Tech
- Keifer Sykes, Green Bay
- Marcus Thornton, William & Mary
- Melo Trimble, Maryland
- Fred VanVleet, Wichita State
- Thomas Walkup, Stephen F. Austin
- Jameel Warney, Stony Brook
- Dez Wells, Maryland
- Joe Young, Oregon

== Academic All-Americans ==
On February 26, 2015, CoSIDA and Capital One announced the 2015 Academic All-America team, with Matt Townsend headlining the University Division as the men's college basketball Academic All-American of the Year. The following is the 2014–15 Capital One Academic All-America Men’s Basketball Team (University Division) as selected by CoSIDA:

First Team
| Player | School | Class | GPA and major |
|---|---|---|---|
| Tyler Harvey | Eastern Washington | Jr. | 3.60 Communication Studies |
| Chasson Randle | Stanford | Sr. | 3.35 African & African-American Studies |
| Shavon Shields | Nebraska | Jr. | 3.73 Biological Sciences |
| Matt Townsend (3) | Yale | Sr. | 3.98 Molecular, Cellular & Develop. Biology |
| Thomas van der Mars (2) | Portland | Gr. | 3.95 Operations & Technology |

Second Team
| Player | School | Class | GPA and major |
|---|---|---|---|
| Alex Barlow | Butler | Sr. | 3.75 Finance |
| Canyon Barry | Charleston | So. | 4.00 Physics |
| Wayne Blackshear | Louisville | Sr. | 3.40 Communication |
| Marcus Paige (2) | North Carolina | Jr. | 3.39 Journalism / History |
| Levi Randolph | Alabama | Gr. | 3.45 Masters of Marketing |

Third Team
| Player | School | Class | GPA and major |
|---|---|---|---|
| Craig Bradshaw | Belmont | Jr. | 3.51 Public Relations |
| Johnny Dee | San Diego | Sr. | 3.49 Business Administration |
| Mike Gesell | Iowa | Jr. | 3.93 Finance |
| Jordan Gregory | Montana | Sr. | 3.69 Psychology |
| John Kopriva | George Washington | Sr. | 3.93 Chemistry |
| Nigel Williams-Goss | Washington | So. | 3.74 Pre-social Science |

== Senior All-Americans ==
The ten finalists for the Senior CLASS Award are called Senior All-Americans. The 10 honorees are as follows:

| Player | Position | School |
|---|---|---|
| Alex Barlow | Guard | Butler |
| Reece Chamberlain | Guard | Belmont |
| D'Angelo Harrison | Guard | St. John's |
| Tyler Haws | Guard | Brigham Young |
| Frank Kaminsky | Forward | Wisconsin |
| D. J. Newbill | Guard | Penn State |
| Kevin Pangos | Guard | Gonzaga |
| Chasson Randle | Guard | Stanford |
| Matt Stainbrook | Center | Xavier |
| Juwan Staten | Guard | West Virginia |
