= Steve Nemeth (gridiron football) =

American gridiron football player (1922–1998)

No. 10, 69, 66
- Position: Quarterback / Placekicker

Personal information
- Born: December 10, 1922; South Bend, Indiana, U.S.
- Died: March 27, 1998 (aged 75); South Bend, Indiana, U.S.
- Listed height: 5 ft 10 in (1.78 m)
- Listed weight: 174 lb (79 kg)

Career information
- High school: South Bend (IN) Riley
- College: Notre Dame

Career history
- Cleveland Rams (1945); Chicago Rockets (1946); Baltimore Colts (1947); Montreal Alouettes (1948); Detroit Lions (1949)*
- * Offseason or practice squad member only

Awards and highlights
- NFL champion (1945); National champion (1943)
- Stats at Pro Football Reference

Steve Joseph Nemeth (December 10, 1922 – March 27, 1998) was an American football quarterback who played two seasons in the All-America Football Conference (AAFC) with the Chicago Rockets and Baltimore Colts. He played college football at the University of Notre Dame. He was also a member of the Cleveland Rams, Montreal Alouettes and Detroit Lions.

== Early life ==
Nemeth played high school football at James Whitcomb Riley High School in South Bend, Indiana. He earned All-State honors in 1940 and 1941. He was inducted into the Indiana Football Hall of Fame on August 15, 1987.

== College career ==
Nemeth played for the Notre Dame Fighting Irish from 1943 to 1944.

== Professional career ==
Nemeth played in nine games, starting four, for the Cleveland Rams of the National Football League (NFL) in 1945. He played in thirteen games, starting one, for the Chicago Rockets of the AAFC during the 1946 season. He played in four games, starting one, for the AAFC's Baltimore Colts in 1947. Nemeth played in eleven games for the Montreal Alouettes of the Canadian Football League in 1948. He spent the 1949 off-season with the NFL's Detroit Lions and was released by the team on August 4, 1949.

== Coaching career ==
Nemeth joined the Notre Dame Fighting Irish as an assistant coach after his professional football career.
