= Missouri Valley Conference Men's Basketball Player of the Year =

Basketball award since 1969

- Awarded for: the most outstanding basketball player in the Missouri Valley Conference
- Country: United States

History
- First award: 1969
- Most recent: Tyler Lundblade, Belmont

The Larry Bird Missouri Valley Conference Men's Basketball Player of the Year is an annual award given to the Missouri Valley Conference's most outstanding player. The award was first given following the 1968–69 season. It was renamed to honor Basketball Hall of Famer Larry Bird, who played at Indiana State from 1977 to 1979 and led the Sycamores to the 1979 NCAA Championship game. Bird won every major player of the year award (including the Naismith and Wooden awards) in 1979.

Drake has the most all-time winners with eight. Three current conference members have not had a winner, but two of them (Murray State and UIC) played their first MVC seasons in 2022–23, and the other (Valparaiso) played its first MVC season in 2017–18.

There have never been any ties for the player of the year, but there have been 10 repeat winners in the award's history. Of the repeat winners, Fred VanVleet of Wichita State (2014 and 2016) and A. J. Green of Northern Iowa (2020, 2022) won in non-consecutive years.

== Key ==
†	Co-Players of the Year
*	Awarded a national player of the year award that same season: Helms Foundation College Basketball Player of the Year (1904–05 to 1978–79); UPI College Basketball Player of the Year (1954–55 to 1995–96); Oscar Robertson Trophy (1958–59 to present); Naismith College Player of the Year (1968–69 to present); John R. Wooden Award (1976–77 to present)
Player (X)	Denotes the number of times the player has been awarded the MVC Player of the Year award at that point

== Winners ==
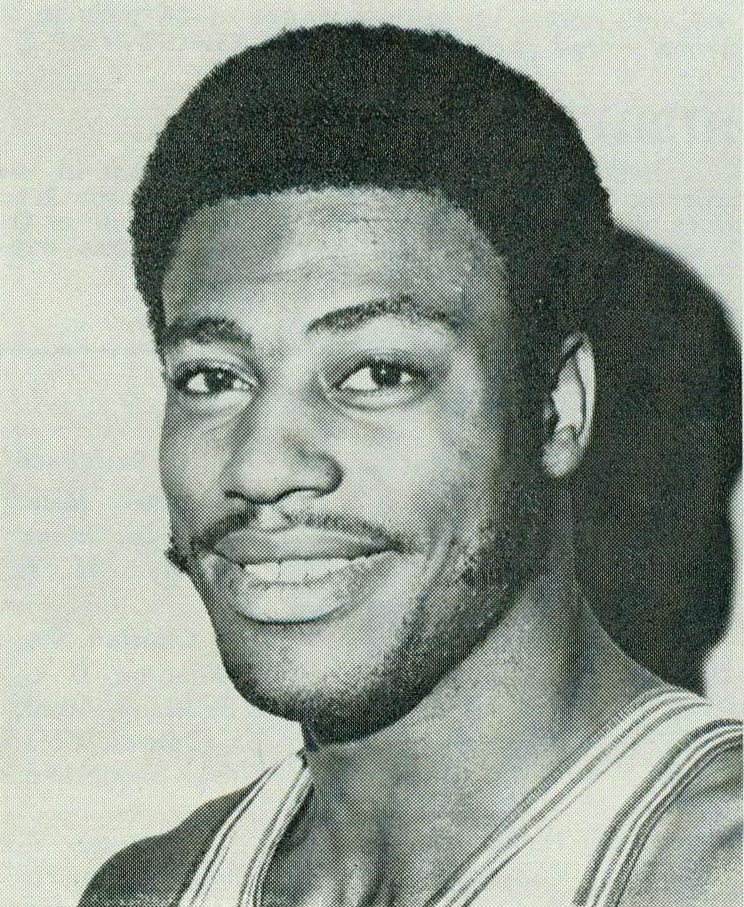
Jim Ard, Cincinnati, 1970

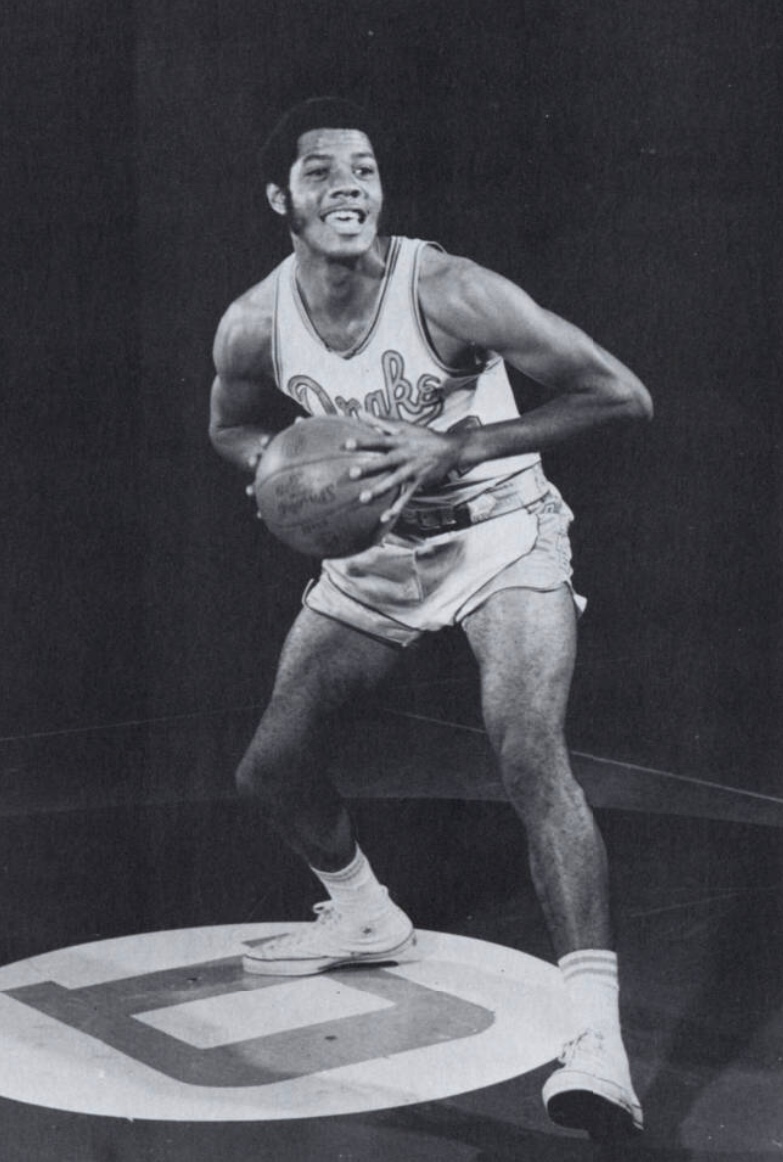
Jeff Halliburton, Drake, 1971

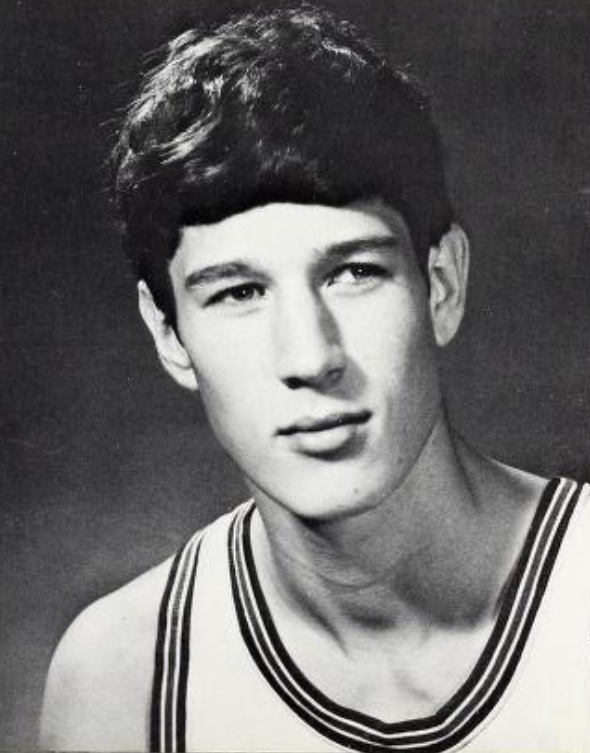
Roger Phegley, Bradley, 1977

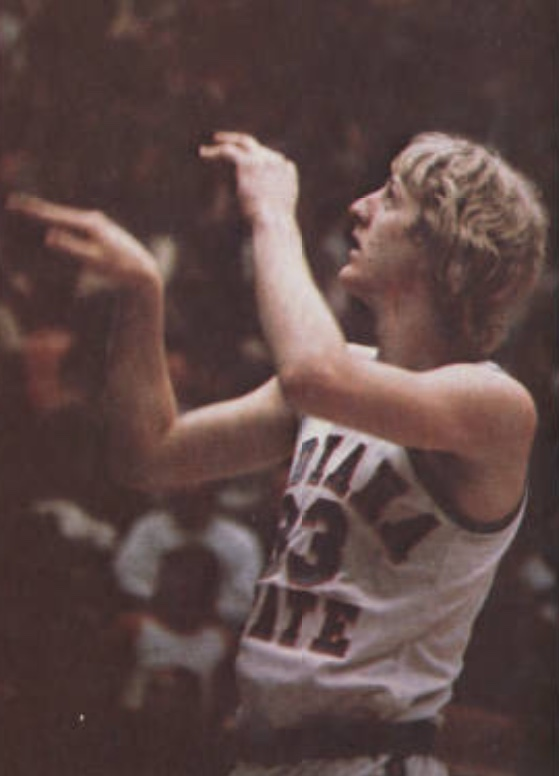
Larry Bird, Indiana State, 1978 and 1979

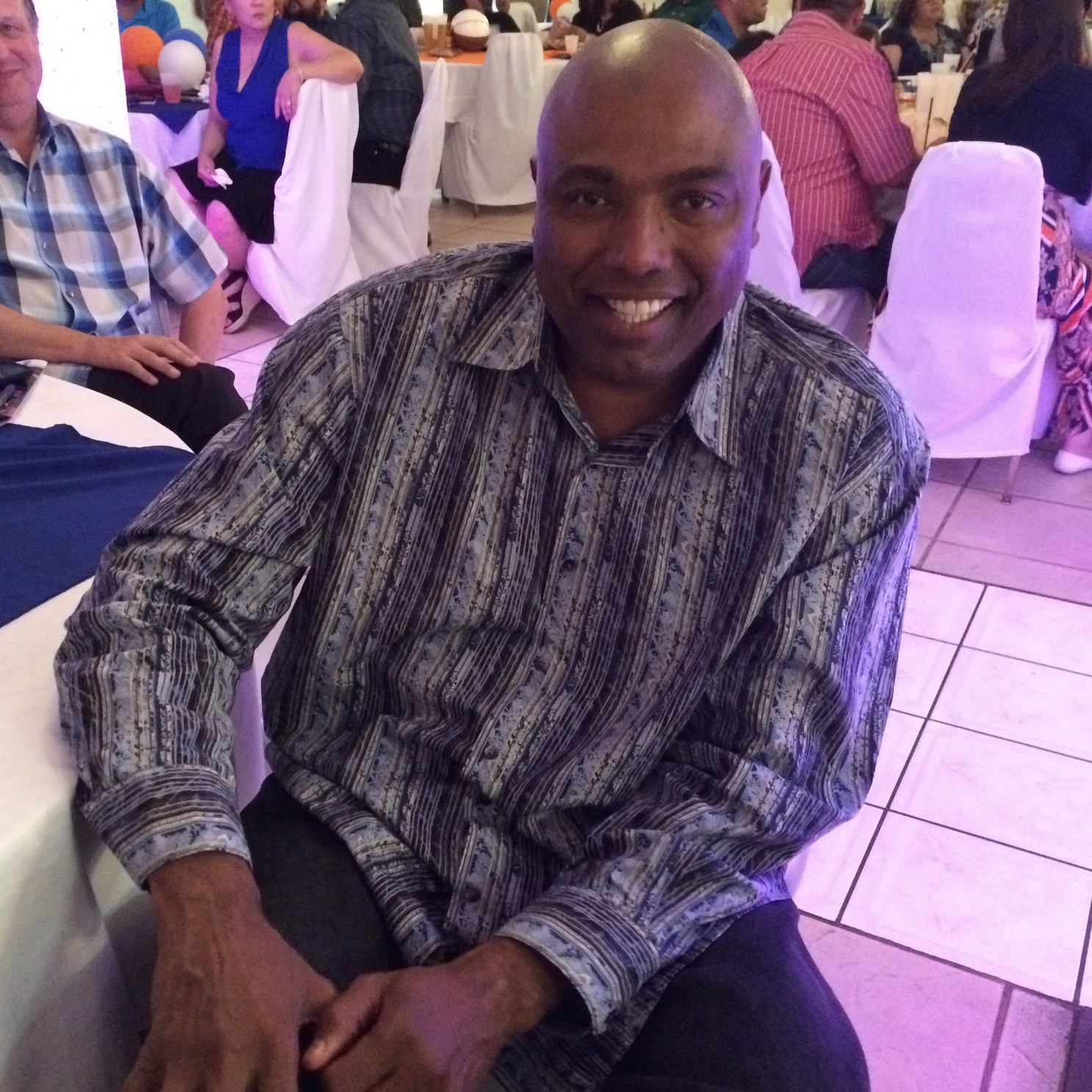
Paul Pressey, Tulsa, 1982

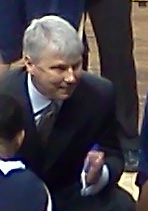
Jim Les, Bradley, 1986

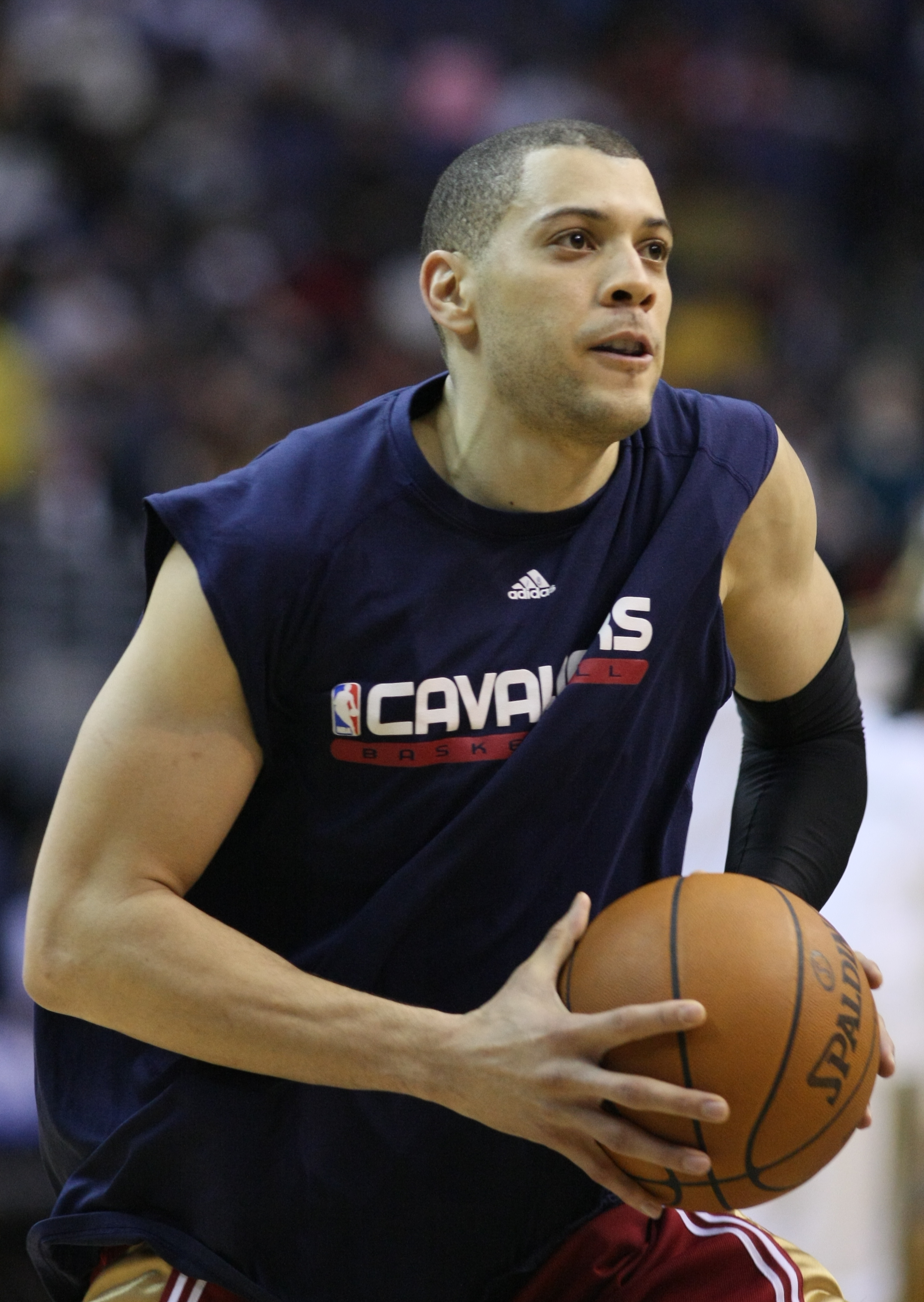
Anthony Parker, Bradley, 1996

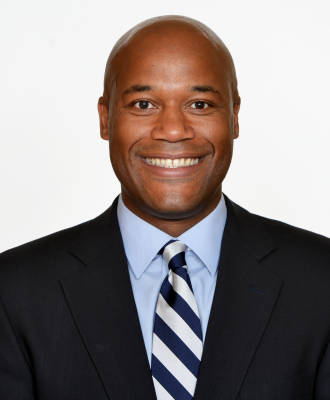
Marcus Wilson, Evansville, 1999

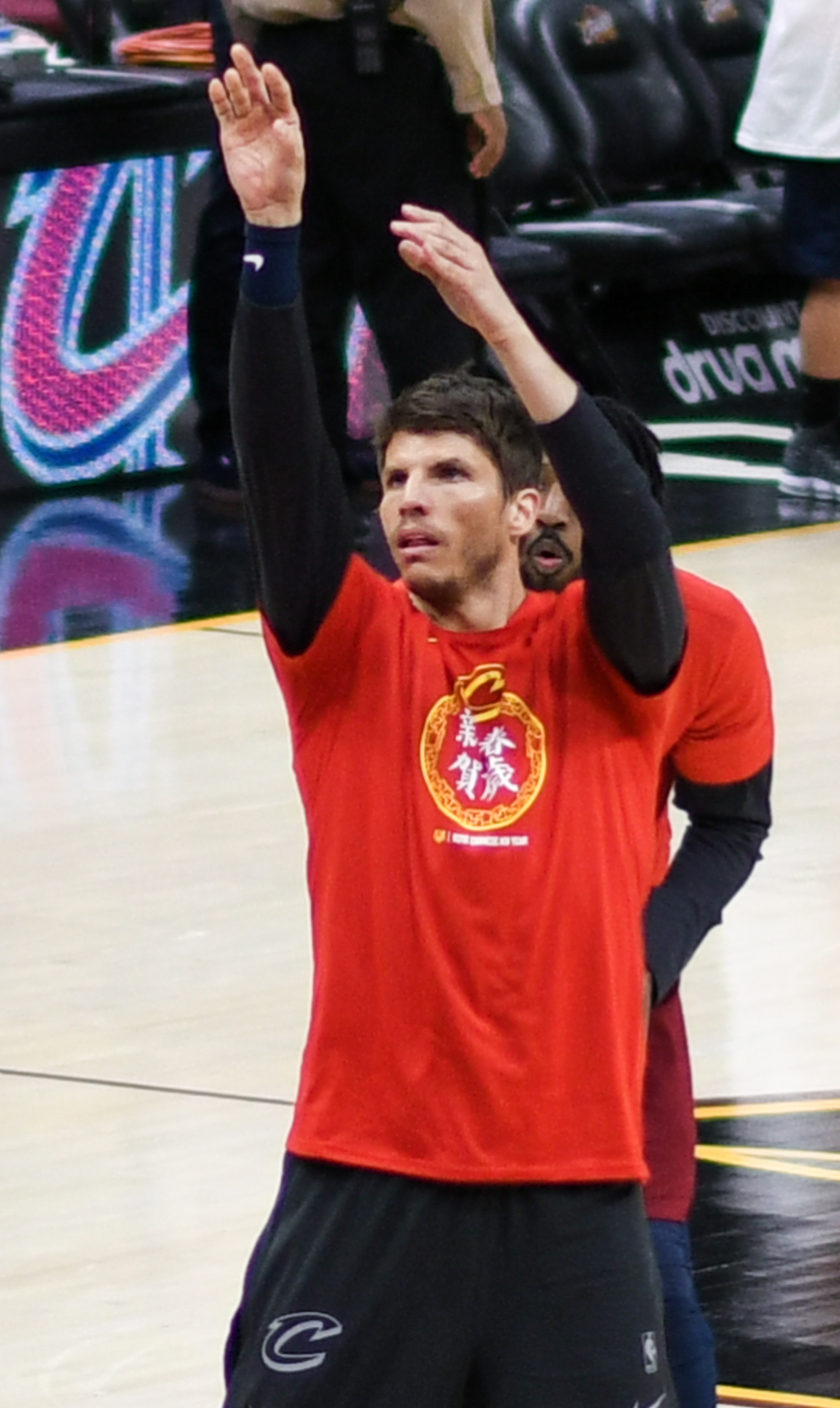
Kyle Korver, Creighton, 2002 and 2003

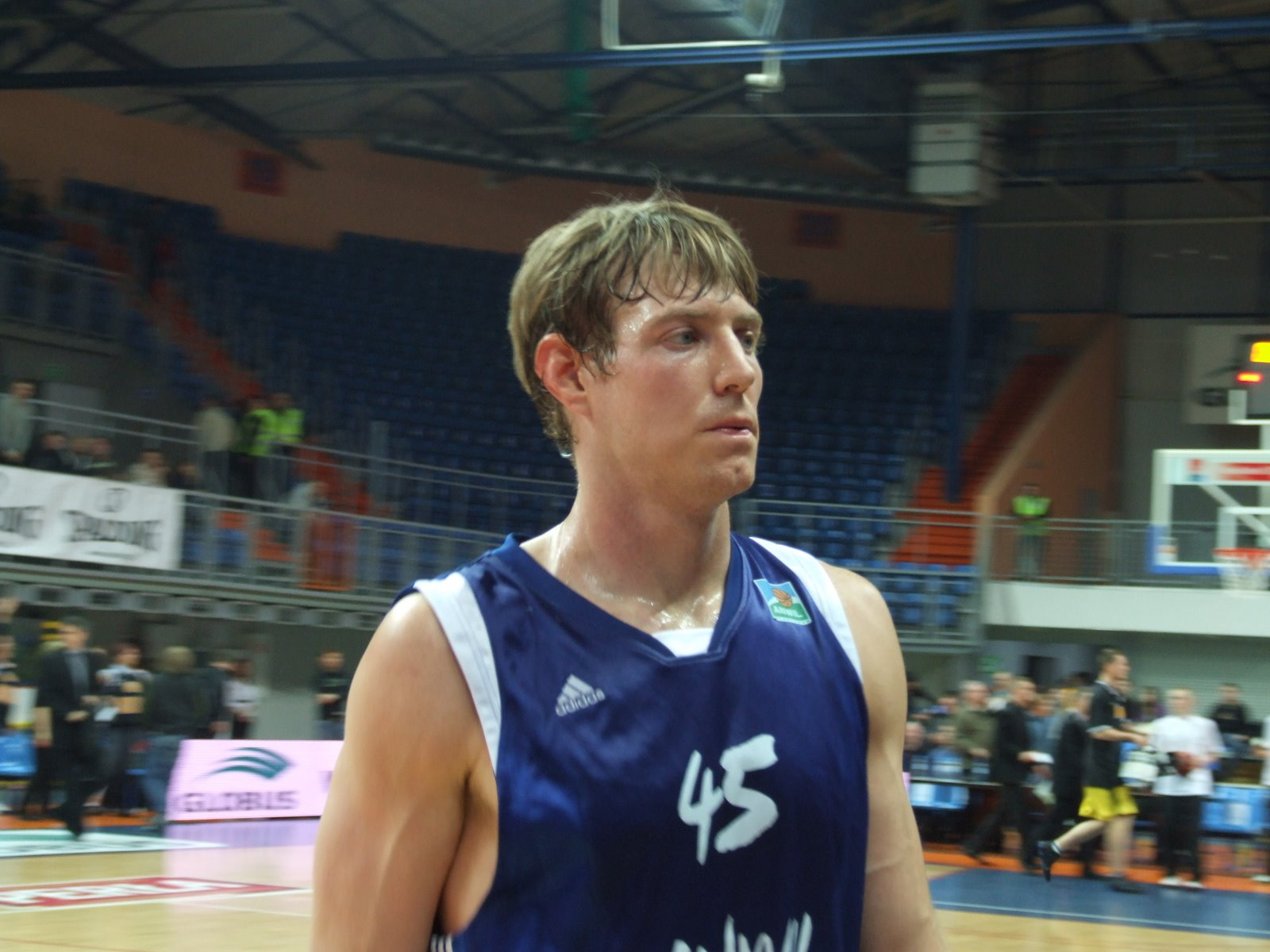
Paul Miller, Wichita State, 2006

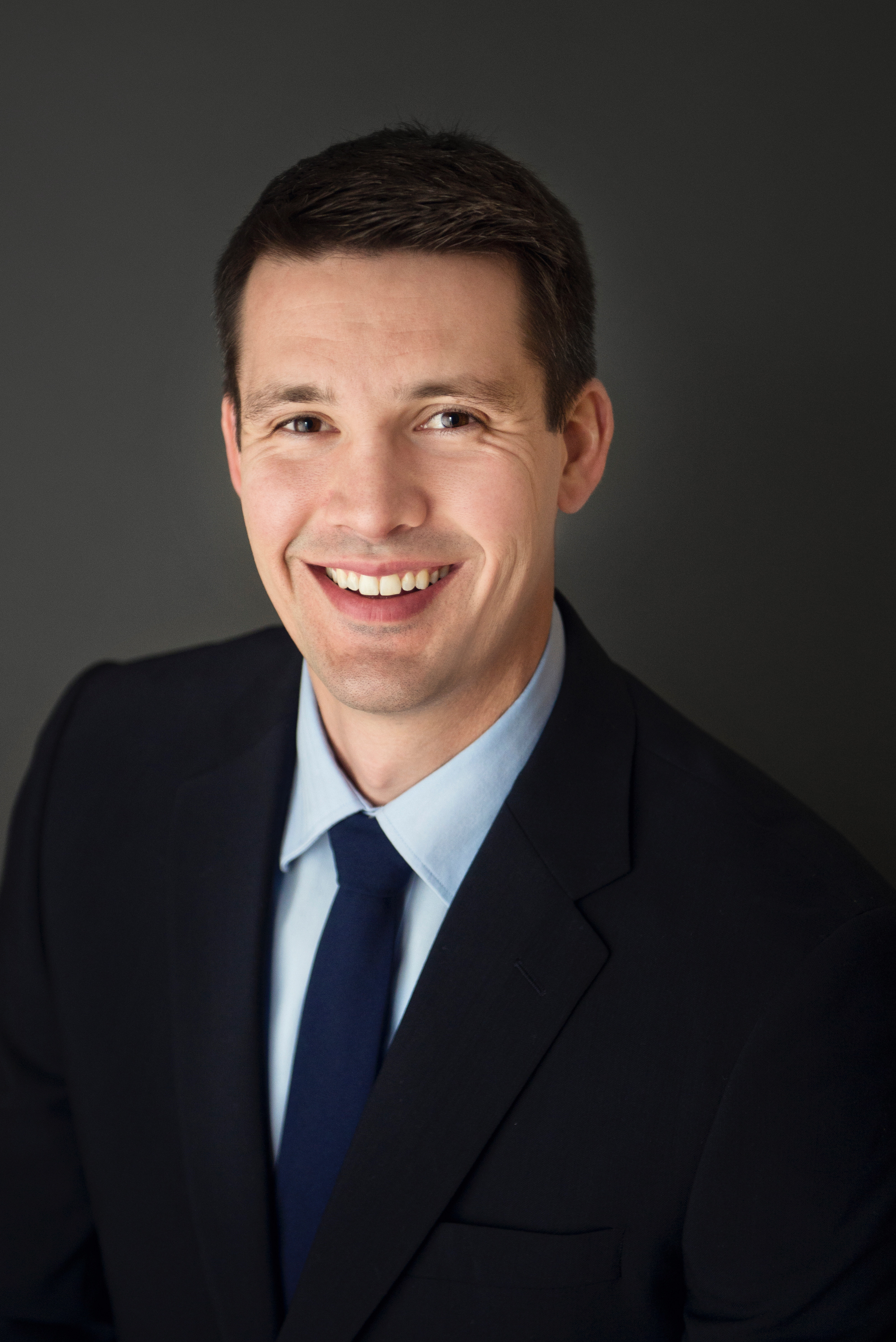
Adam Koch, Northern Iowa, 2010

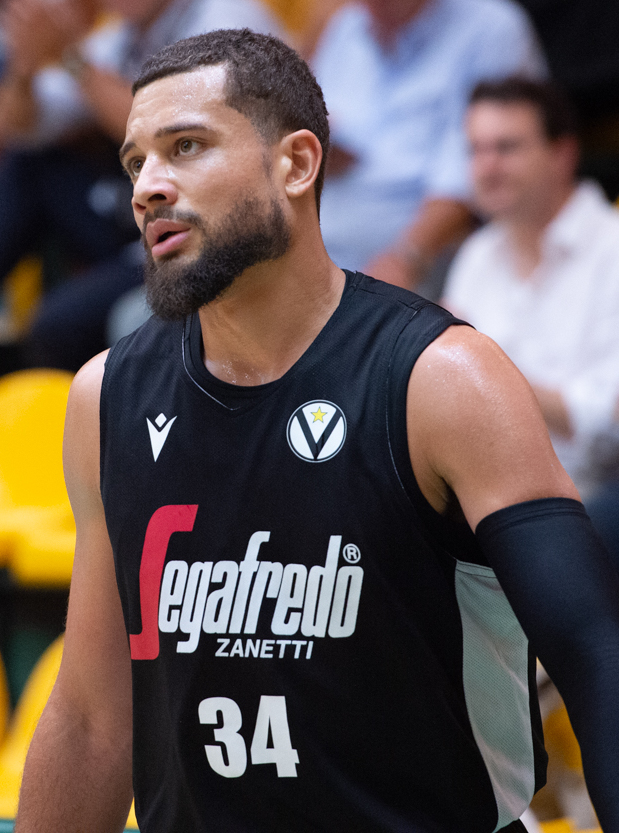
Kyle Weems, Missouri State, 2011

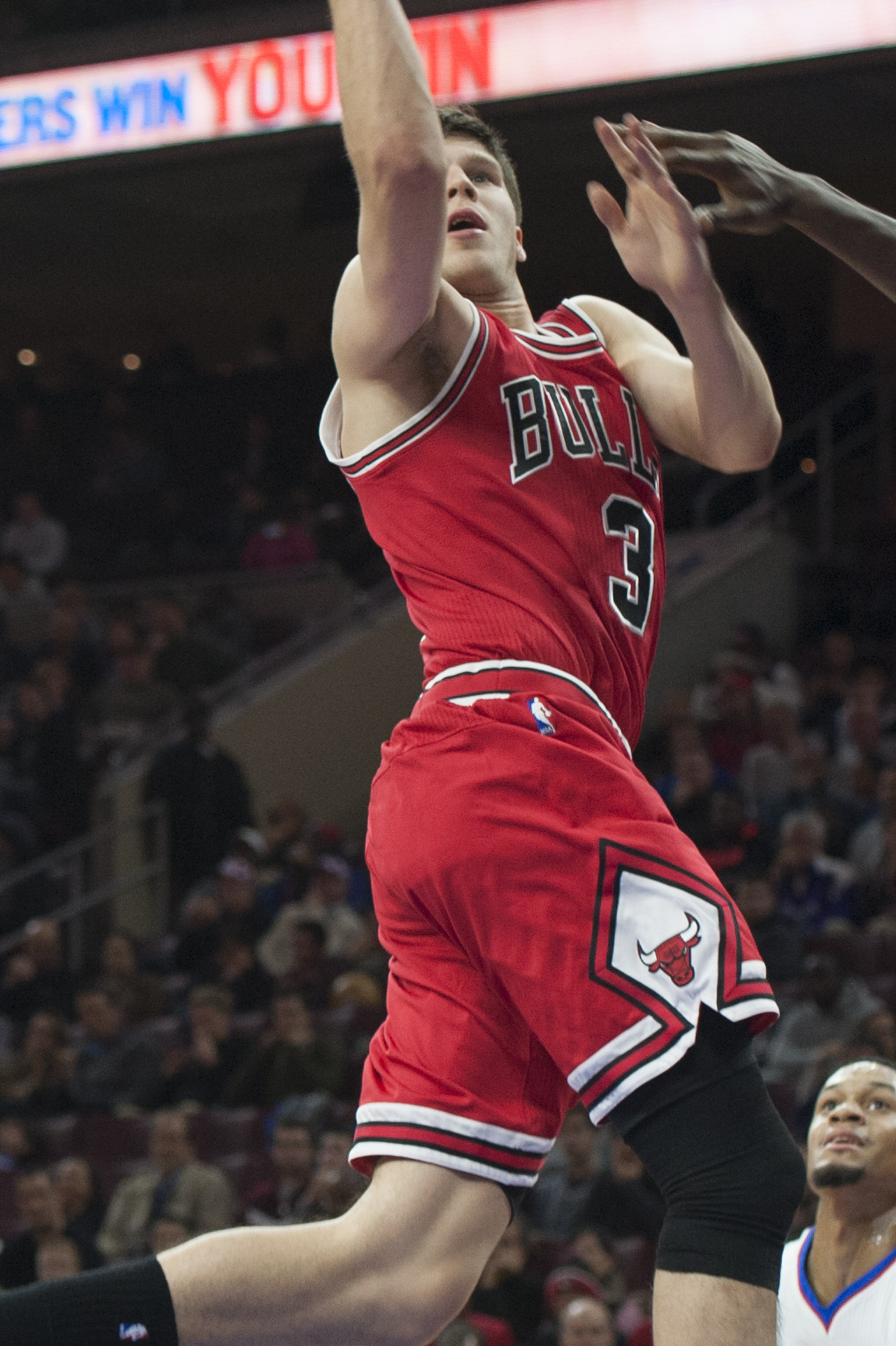
Doug McDermott, Creighton, 2012 and 2013

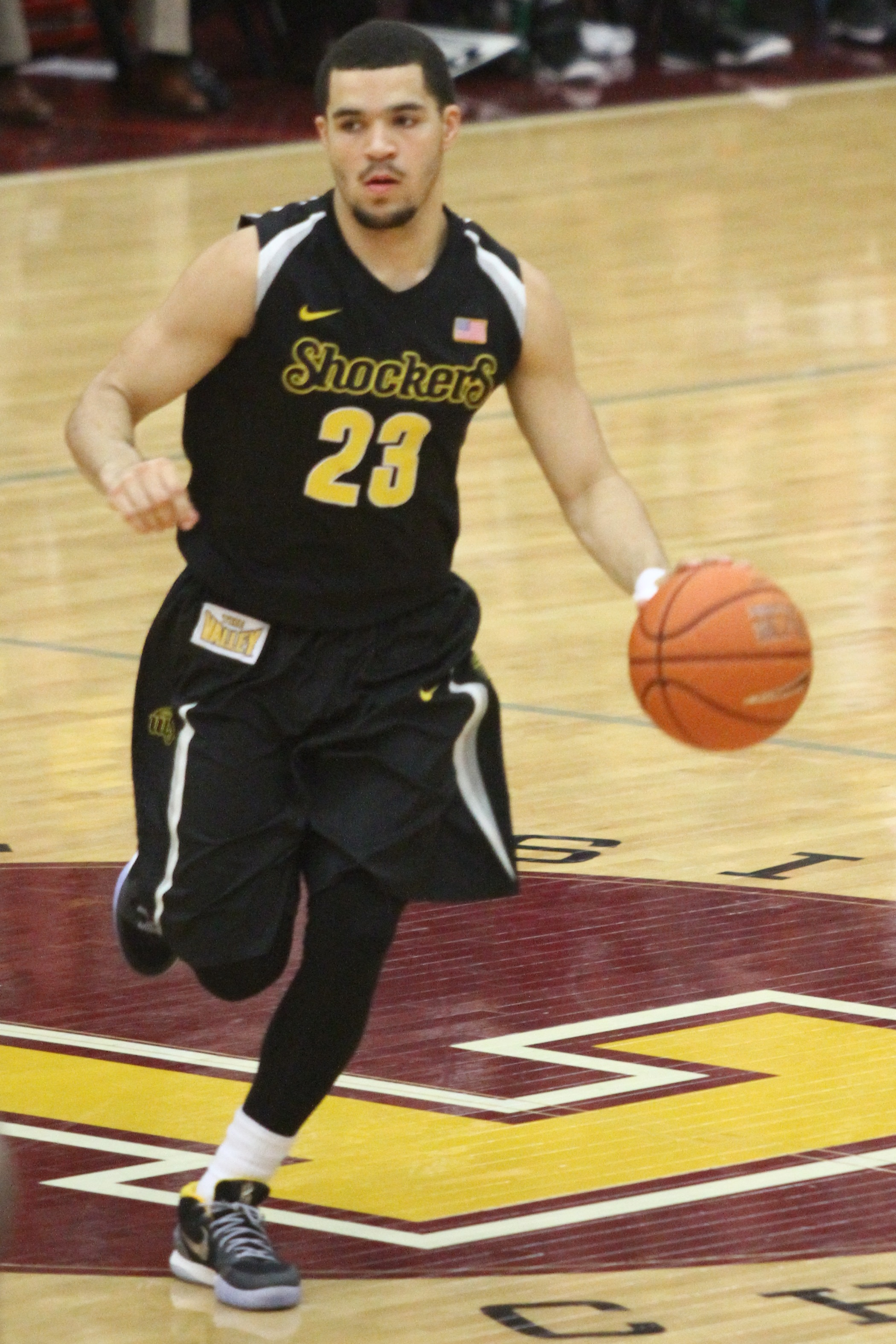
Fred VanVleet, Wichita State, 2014 and 2016

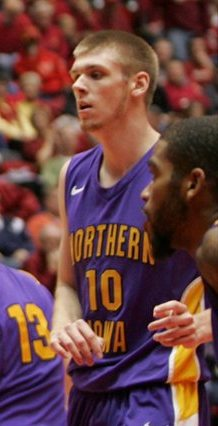
Seth Tuttle, Northern Iowa, 2015

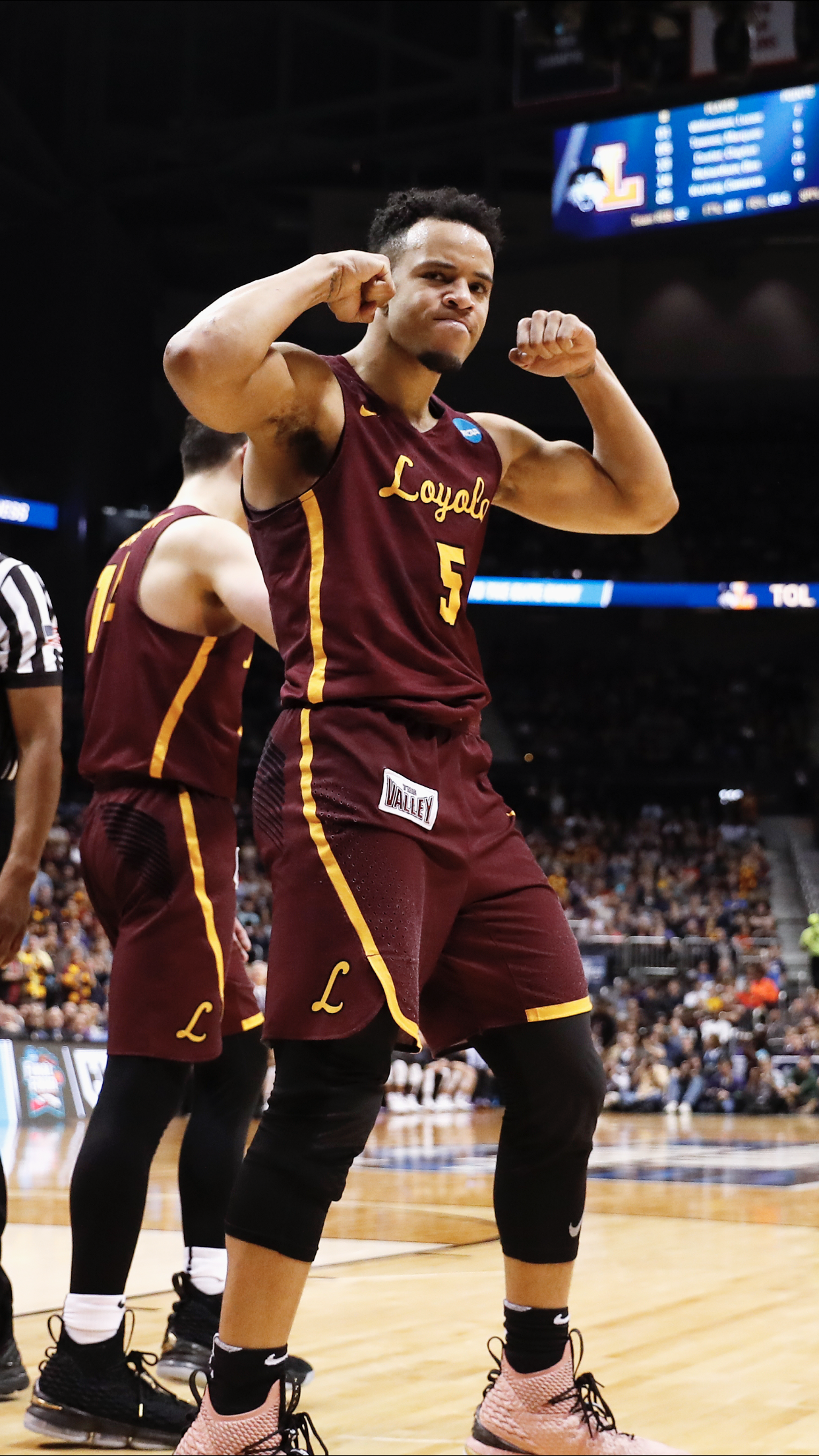
Marques Townes, Loyola, 2019

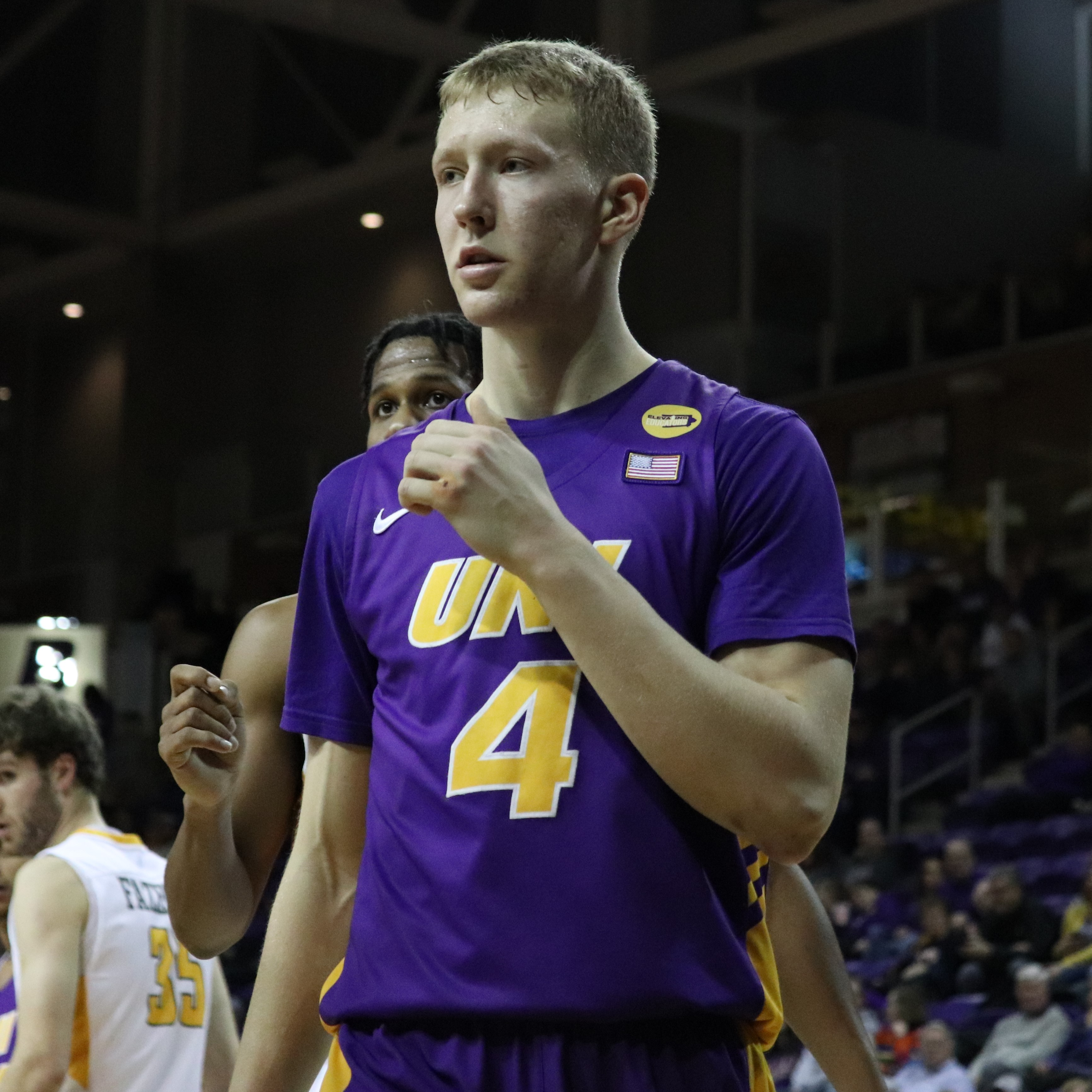
A. J. Green, Northern Iowa, 2020 and 2022

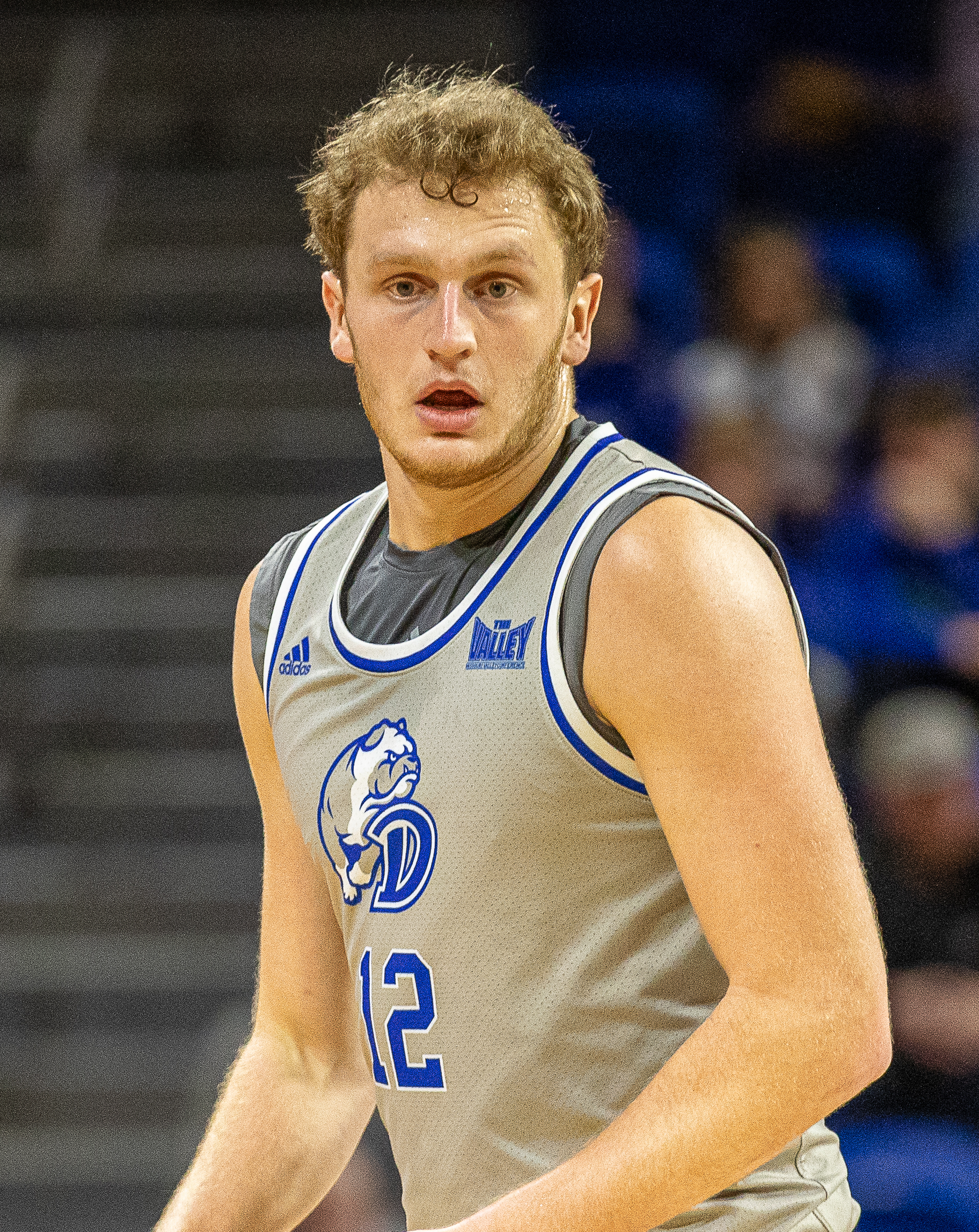
Tucker DeVries, Drake, 2023 and 2024

Season	Player	School	Position	Class	Reference
1968–69	Bingo Smith	Tulsa	SF	Senior	
1969–70	Jim Ard	Cincinnati	C	Senior	
1970–71	Jeff Halliburton	Drake	SF	Senior	
1971–72	Larry Finch	Memphis	G	Junior	
1972–73	Larry Kenon	Memphis	PF	Junior	
1973–74	Junior Bridgeman	Louisville	SF	Junior	
1974–75	Junior Bridgeman (2)	Louisville	SF	Senior	
1975–76	Mike Glenn	Southern Illinois	PG	Junior	
1976–77	Roger Phegley	Bradley	SG	Junior	
1977–78	Larry Bird	Indiana State	SF	Junior	
1978–79	Larry Bird* (2)	Indiana State	SF	Senior	
1979–80	Lewis Lloyd	Drake	SF / SG	Junior	
1980–81	Lewis Lloyd (2)	Drake	SF / SG	Senior	
1981–82	Paul Pressey	Tulsa	PG / F	Senior	
1982–83	Antoine Carr	Wichita State	C	Senior	
1983–84	Xavier McDaniel	Wichita State	PF	Junior	
1984–85	Xavier McDaniel (2)	Wichita State	PF	Senior	
1985–86	Jim Les	Bradley	PG	Senior	
1986–87	Hersey Hawkins	Bradley	SG	Junior	
1987–88	Hersey Hawkins* (2)	Bradley	SG	Senior	
1988–89	Anthony Manuel	Bradley	PG	Senior	
1989–90	Bob Harstad	Creighton	PF	Junior	
1990–91	Chad Gallagher	Creighton	C	Senior	
1991–92	Ashraf Amaya	Southern Illinois	PF	Junior	
1992–93	Curt Smith	Drake	PG	Junior	
1993–94	Gary Collier	Tulsa	SF	Senior	
1994–95	Chris Carr	Southern Illinois	SG	Junior	
1995–96	Anthony Parker	Bradley	SG / SF	Junior	
1996–97	Jason Daisy	Northern Iowa	PG	Senior	
1997–98	Rico Hill	Illinois State	F	Senior	
1998–99	Marcus Wilson	Evansville	SG / PG	Senior	
1999–00	Nate Green	Indiana State	SF	Senior	
2000–01	Tarise Bryson	Illinois State	PG	Junior	
2001–02	Kyle Korver	Creighton	SF / SG	Junior	
2002–03	Kyle Korver (2)	Creighton	SF / SG	Senior	
2003–04	Darren Brooks	Southern Illinois	G	Junior	
2004–05	Darren Brooks (2)	Southern Illinois	G	Senior	
2005–06	Paul Miller	Wichita State	C	Senior	
2006–07	Jamaal Tatum	Southern Illinois	SG	Senior	
2007–08	Adam Emmenecker	Drake	PG	Senior	
2008–09	Booker Woodfox	Creighton	SG	Senior	
2009–10	Adam Koch	Northern Iowa	PF	Senior	
2010–11	Kyle Weems	Missouri State	SF	Junior	
2011–12	Doug McDermott	Creighton	SF / PF	Sophomore	
2012–13	Doug McDermott (2)	Creighton	SF / PF	Junior	
2013–14	Fred VanVleet	Wichita State	PG	Sophomore	
2014–15	Seth Tuttle	Northern Iowa	PF	Senior	
2015–16	Fred VanVleet (2)	Wichita State	PG	Senior	
2016–17	Paris Lee	Illinois State	PG	Senior	
2017–18	Clayton Custer	Loyola	PG	Junior	
2018–19	Marques Townes	Loyola	SG	Senior	
2019–20	A. J. Green	Northern Iowa	PG	Sophomore	
2020–21	Cameron Krutwig	Loyola	C	Senior	
2021–22	A. J. Green (2)	Northern Iowa	PG	Junior	
2022–23	Tucker DeVries	Drake	SG / SF	Sophomore	
2023–24	Tucker DeVries (2)	Drake	SG / SF	Junior	
2024–25	Bennett Stirtz	Drake	PG	Junior	
2025–26	Tyler Lundblade	Belmont	SG	Graduate	

== Winners by school ==
School (year joined)	Winners	Years
Drake (1907)	8	1971, 1980, 1981, 1993, 2008, 2023, 2024, 2025
Creighton (1977) (Note: Creighton University left in 2013 to join the Big East Conference.)	7	1990, 1991, 2002, 2003, 2009, 2012, 2013
Bradley (1948)	6	1977, 1986, 1987, 1988, 1989, 1996
Southern Illinois (1975)	6	1976, 1992, 1995, 2004, 2005, 2007
Wichita State (1945) (Note: Wichita State University left in 2017 to join the American Athletic Conference (The American).)	6	1983, 1984, 1985, 2006, 2014, 2016
Northern Iowa (1991)	5	1997, 2010, 2015, 2020, 2022
Illinois State (1981)	3	1998, 2001, 2017
Indiana State (1977)	3	1978, 1979, 2000
Loyola (2013) (Note: Loyola University Chicago left in 2022 to join the Atlantic 10 Conference.)	3	2018, 2019, 2021
Tulsa (1935) (Note: The University of Tulsa left in 1996 to join the Western Athletic Conference, and is now in The American.)	3	1969, 1982, 1994
Louisville (1963) (Note: The University of Louisville left in 1975 to become a founding member of the Metro Conference, and is now in the Atlantic Coast Conference.)	2	1974, 1975
Memphis (1968) (Note: The University of Memphis left in 1973 and briefly went independent before becoming a founding member of the Metro Conference. The school is now in The American.)	2	1972, 1973
Belmont (2022)	1	2026
Cincinnati (1957) (Note: The University of Cincinnati left in 1970 to go independent, and is now in the Big 12 Conference.)	1	1970
Evansville (1994)	1	1999
Missouri State (1990) (Note: Missouri State University will leave in 2025 to join Conference USA.)	1	2011
Murray State (2022)	0	—
UIC (2022)	0	—
Valparaiso (2017)	0	—
