= Fred VanVleet =

American basketball player (born 1994)

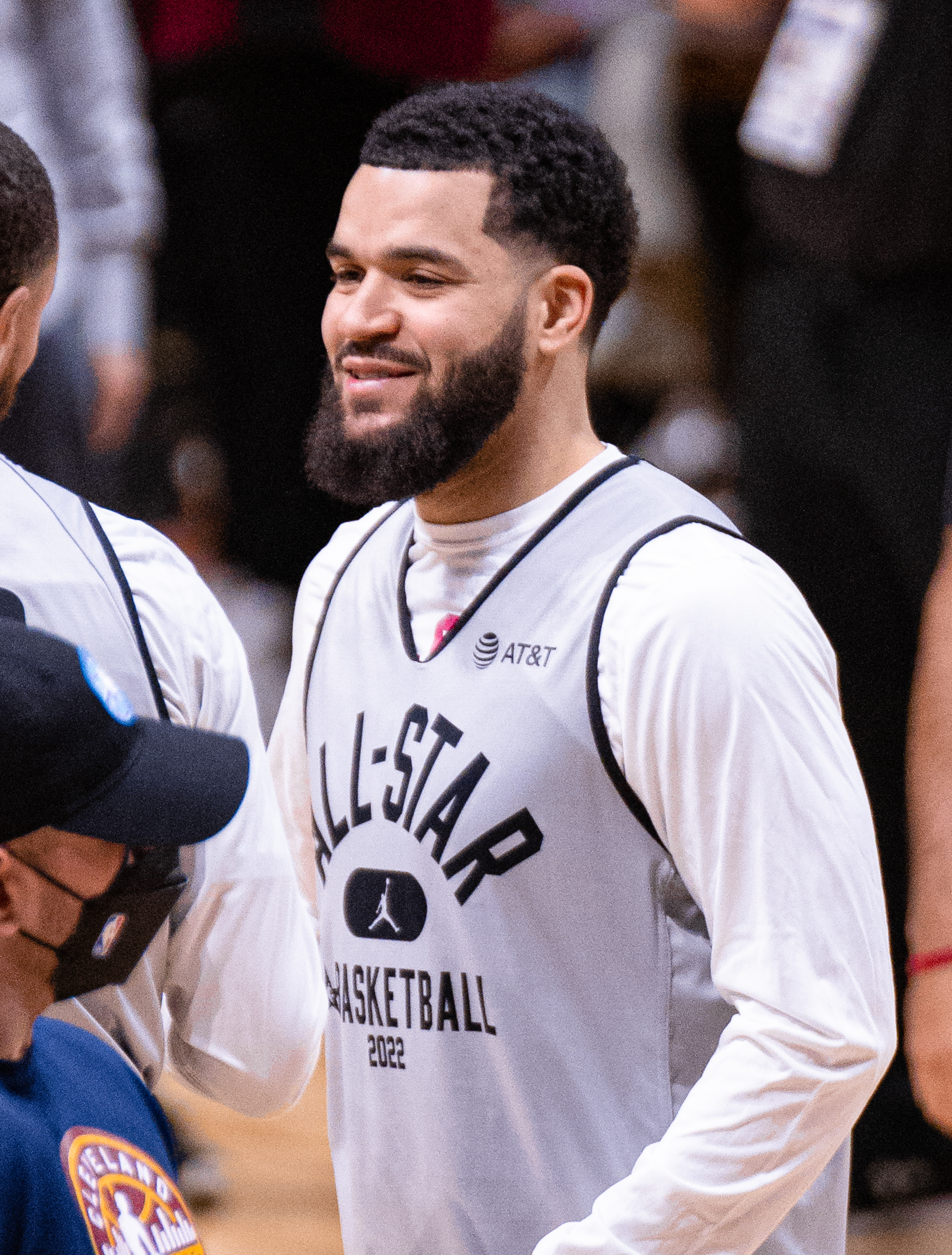
- VanVleet at the 2022 NBA All-Star Game

No. 5 – Houston Rockets
- Position: Point guard
- League: NBA

Personal information
- Born: February 25, 1994 (age 32) Rockford, Illinois, U.S.
- Listed height: 6 ft 0 in (1.83 m)
- Listed weight: 213 lb (97 kg)

Career information
- High school: Auburn (Rockford, Illinois)
- College: Wichita State (2012–2016)
- NBA draft: 2016: undrafted
- Playing career: 2016–present

Career history
- 2016–2023: Toronto Raptors
- 2016–2017: →Raptors 905
- 2023–present: Houston Rockets

Career highlights
- NBA champion (2019); NBA All-Star (2022); NBA D-League champion (2017); Third-team All-American – SN, NABC (2014); 3× AP Honorable mention All-American (2014–2016); 2× MVC Player of the Year (2014, 2016); 3× First-team All-MVC (2014–2016)
- Stats at NBA.com
- Stats at Basketball Reference

Fredderick Edmund VanVleet Sr. (born February 25, 1994) is an American professional basketball player for the Houston Rockets of the National Basketball Association (NBA). He is also the current president of the National Basketball Players Association (NBPA).

A point guard, VanVleet played college basketball for Wichita State University. He contributed to a resurgence of Wichita State Shockers basketball that included a Final Four run by the 2012–13 Shockers team and an undefeated regular season by the 2013–14 team. VanVleet is the Wichita State career assists leader and was named MVC Men's Basketball Player of the Year as both a sophomore and a senior.

After going undrafted in the 2016 NBA draft, VanVleet signed with the Toronto Raptors. He spent time with the Raptors and their G League affiliate, Raptors 905, during the 2016–17 season and was a member of Raptors 905's 2017 championship team. He went on to become a key player for the Raptors and won an NBA championship with the team in 2019. He was named to his first NBA All-Star Game in 2022.

== Early life ==
VanVleet was born on February 25, 1994, in Rockford, Illinois, to Susan VanVleet and Fred Manning. His father was murdered in 1999 when VanVleet was five years old. His mother later remarried Joe Danforth, a U.S. Army veteran and retired police officer of the Rockford Police Department, who became VanVleet's stepfather and also served as his personal trainer.

== High school career ==
VanVleet played for Auburn High School in Rockford, Illinois, where he was an All-State first-team selection by the Chicago Sun-Times (Class 4A), Associated Press (Class 4A), and Chicago Tribune as a senior in 2012. In 2012, VanVleet helped lead Auburn to a 22-game winning streak which resulted in the school's first Illinois High School Association (IHSA) final four since 1975. He led the Knights to a 3rd-place finish in the IHSA state tournament.

VanVleet remained loyal to his local Rockford Amateur Athletic Union (AAU) club team rather than accept offers to more high-profile teams in Chicago. VanVleet did not feel it would make a difference in his recruiting: "As long as you're leading whoever you're playing with, the coaches are going to see that. If they see you competing and winning with guys maybe I shouldn't be winning with, that's maybe even an advantage for me." VanVleet received basketball scholarship offers from Colorado State, Northern Illinois, Wichita State, Southern Illinois, Drake, Detroit Mercy, and Kent State. His stepfather felt that VanVleet was being overlooked by many Chicago metropolitan area schools because of his decision not to join a Chicago AAU team. VanVleet cut his list down to Kent State, Northern Illinois and Wichita State. When VanVleet accepted an offer to play for Wichita State, he became the only member of the national class of 2012 Rivals.com top 150 to attend a Missouri Valley Conference school.

College recruiting
Name	Hometown	School	Height	Weight	Commit date
Fred VanVleet; PG	Rockford, IL	Auburn High School (IL)	6 ft 1 in (1.85 m)	195 lb (88 kg)	Apr 7, 2011
Fred VanVleet; PG	Recruit ratings: Scout: Rivals: (92)				
Overall recruit ranking: Scout: 99, 18 (PG) Rivals: 138, 19 (PG) ESPN: 83, 15 (PG), 1 (IL)
Note: In many cases, Scout, Rivals, 247Sports, On3, and ESPN may conflict in their listings of height and weight.; In these cases, the average was taken. ESPN grades are on a 100-point scale.; Sources: "Wichita State 2012 Basketball Commitments". Rivals.; "2012 Wichita State Basketball Commits". Scout.; "2012 Wichita State Basketball Commits". ESPN.; "Scout.com Team Recruiting Rankings". Scout.; "2012 Team Ranking". Rivals.

== College career ==
=== Freshman year ===
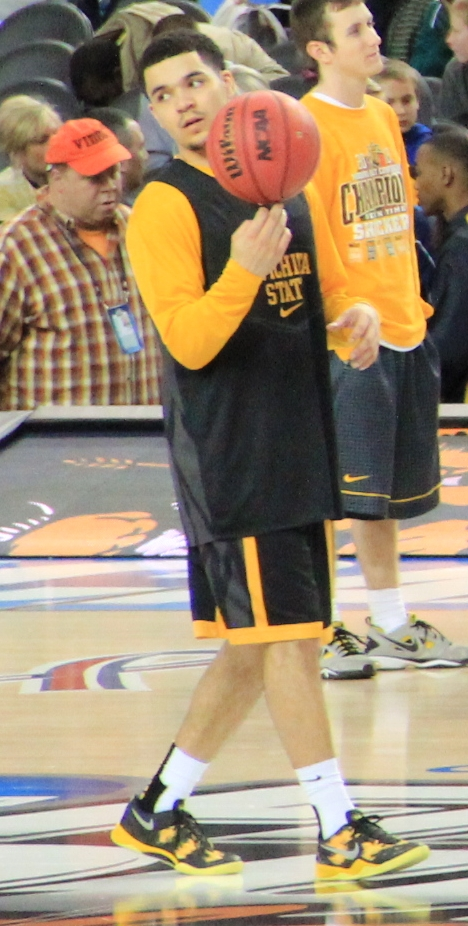
VanVleet as a freshman for the 2012–13 Wichita State Shockers

As a freshman, VanVleet contributed double-digit scoring twice against Gonzaga and Ohio State in the 2013 NCAA Division I men's basketball tournament from off the bench as the 2012–13 Shockers team reached the final four. Against Gonzaga, his 13 points included a basket with 1:28 remaining that helped the Shockers secure only the fifth Sweet 16 appearance by a #9 seed since the tournament went to 64 teams in 1985. VanVleet's 12 points against Ohio State included a late basket that helped the Shockers become the fifth team with a seeding higher than eight to make it to the final four since 1979 when seeding began. VanVleet was mentored by senior Malcolm Armstead.

=== Sophomore year ===
VanVleet broke out as a sophomore, as expected. On January 23, 2014, he was selected to the 23-man Oscar Robertson Award midseason watchlist by the United States Basketball Writers Association. On February 17, Vanvleet was selected as one of 23 finalists for the Bob Cousy Award. When the Rockford native returned to the Chicago metropolitan area on February 19 to lead Wichita State against Loyola, he went 6-for-6 from the field and 10-for-10 on his free throw attempts for a game-high 22 points and added eight rebounds and 6 assists to help Wichita State raise its record to 28–0. The 28–0 Shockers (Cleanthony Early, Tekele Cotton, VanVleet, Ron Baker and Chadrack Lufile) appeared on the cover of the February 24, 2014 Sports Illustrated. On February 28, VanVleet was named one of the ten semi-finalists for the Naismith Award.

VanVleet helped lead the 2013–14 team to the first 31–0 regular season in NCAA Division I men's basketball history. As a result, he was named to the MVC All-Conference first team and selected as the MVC Men's Basketball Player of the Year. VanVleet was also selected to the 2014 MVC Most-Improved Team. Following the 2014 MVC men's basketball tournament, he was a 2014 NCAA Men's Basketball All-American second-team selection by Sports Illustrated and Bleacher Report, third-team selection by the Sporting News and the NABC. VanVleet earned honorable mention recognition from the Associated Press. On March 11, he was named to the all-District VI (IA, MO, KS, OK, NE, ND, SD) team by the United States Basketball Writers Association (USBWA). VanVleet was listed on the National Association of Basketball Coaches Division I All‐District 16 first team on March 12. He was named as one of six finalists for the Cousy Award (along with Kyle Anderson, Aaron Craft, Tyler Ennis, Shabazz Napier and Marcus Paige). For the season, VanVleet led the MVC in assists per game (5.36). Following his sophomore season, VanVleet delivered the commencement address at his high school alma mater and became a highly demanded public speaker.

=== Junior year ===
VanVleet for the 2014–15 Wichita State Shockers

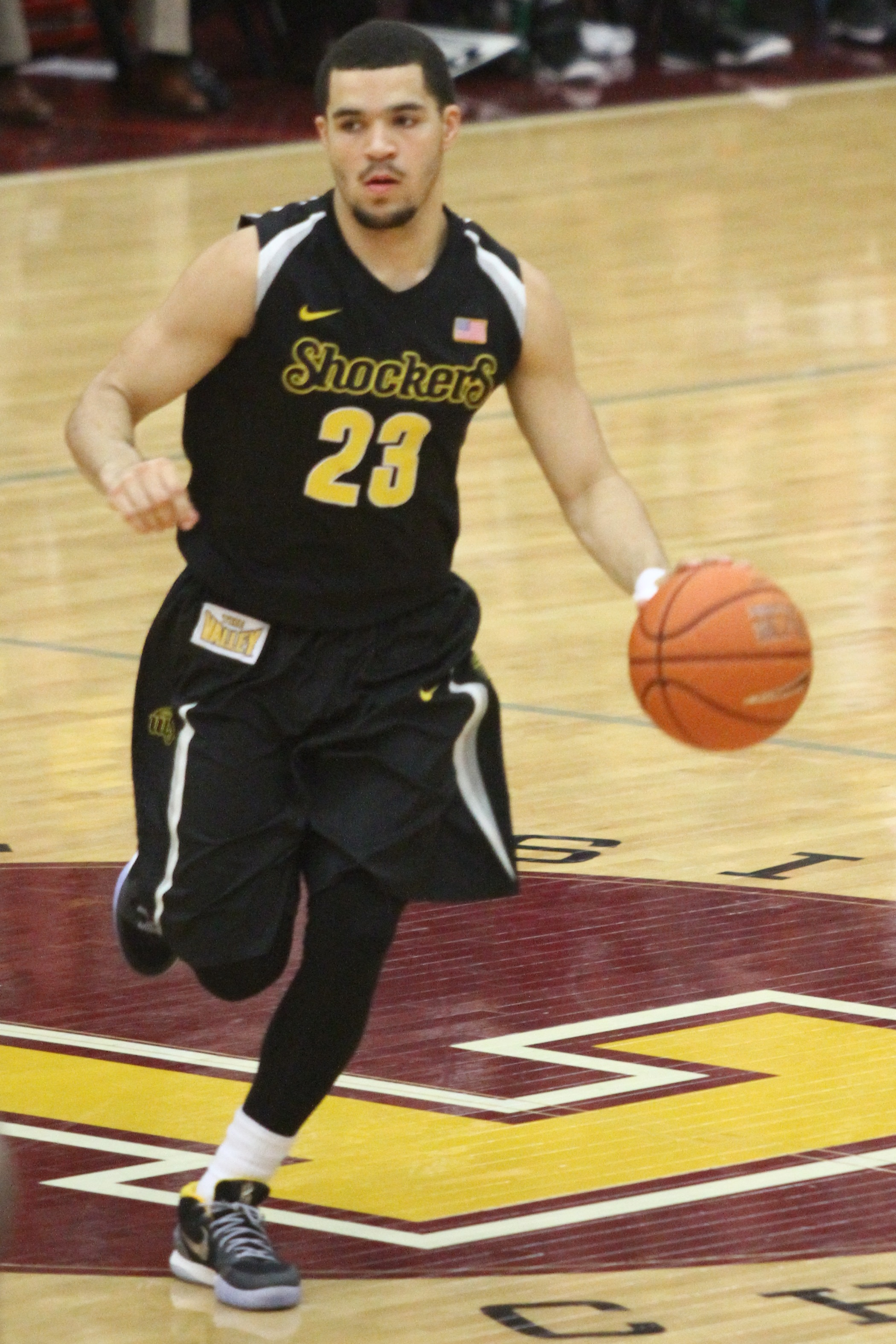
VanVleet dribbling in 2015

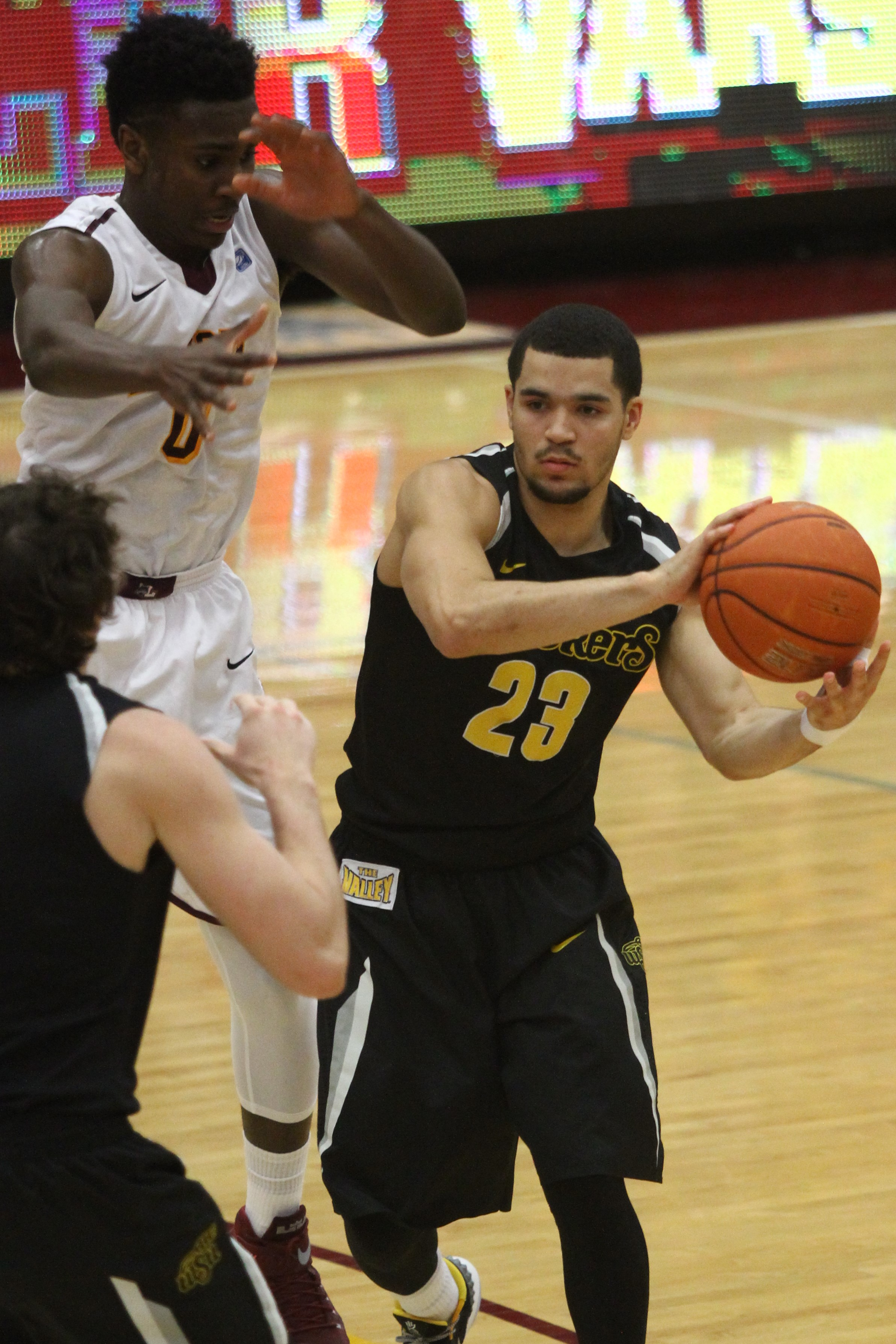
VanVleet being defended by Donte Ingram in 2015

VanVleet was Preseason All-American first-team selection by USA Today, Blue Ribbon College Basketball Yearbook, Bleacher Report, CBSSports.com, Sports Illustrated and Associated Press. He was a second-team selection by Athlon Sports, SB Nation and NBCSports.com. In its preseason top 100 player ranking, VanVleet was listed at number 5 by ESPN. He was named to the 36-man Bob Cousy Award Preseason Watch List. VanVleet was also listed as a John R. Wooden Award Preseason Top 50 candidate and an Oscar Robertson Trophy Watch List selection. VanVleet was also included in the early December Naismith Award top 50 watch list.

On November 14, VanVleet had seven steals in the opener against New Mexico State, tying a school record. On December 3, against #25 Utah, VanVleet helped Wichita State recover from a nine-point deficit in the final 2:45 of regulation with eight points (including two three-point shots in the final 1:15) and an assist on a three-point shot, but with seven seconds remaining in overtime and Wichita trailing by one, he missed the front end of a one and one. In his return visit to Chicago and the Gentile Center to play Loyola on January 11, VanVleet was perfect from the field again with a 5-for-5 performance and added a career-high-tying 10 assists (as well as 6 rebounds and 3 steals) for his first career double-double. However, VanVleet snapped his perfect streak of 20 free throws made in his home state with a 3-for-4 performance. In the rematch against Loyola on January 28, VanVleet posted a career-high 27 points. On February 7, he posted the first triple-double for Wichita State Shockers men's basketball in 43 years with a 10-point, 10-rebound and 11-assist performance (to go along with four steals) against Missouri State. On February 16, VanVleet was MVC Co-player of the Week (with Seth Tuttle). On February 26, he broke the all-time Wichita State career assist record against Evansville with 431 assists, surpassing Warren Jabali who had 429 and Toure' Murry who had 430. VanVleet was one of 17 finalists for the Cousy Award. The Shockers defeated Northern Iowa on February 28 to win the MVC regular-season title. In the opening game of the 2015 NCAA Division I men's basketball tournament for the Shockers, VanVleet matched a career high with 27 points against Indiana. He finished the tournament with 17-point and 25-point performances against #2-seeded Kansas and #3-seeded Notre Dame, respectively. For the season, VanVleet repeated as the MVC in assists per game (5.23) leader.

VanVleet was named an All-MVC first-team selection following the regular season. He was also recognized by the Associated Press as an honorable mention selection for its All-America team.

=== Senior year ===
VanVleet was a selection to the 20-man Bob Cousy Award preseason watchlist, and the 30-man Lute Olson Award preseason watchlist. He was a second-team selection to the Sporting News, Sports Illustrated and Athlon Sports preseason All-American teams. VanVleet was a third-team selection to the CBS Sports, USA Today and NBC Sports preseason All-American teams. Lindy's Sports did not name an All-America team, but did rank all college basketball players by position and presented a top 25 list at each position. It included VanVleet as its second-best point guard. In preseason top 100 player rankings, he was ranked 14th by ESPN and 17th by NBC Sports. VanVleet made the initial 50-man John R. Wooden Award watch list on November 17. On December 2, he earned recognition on the 50-man Naismith College Player of the Year watchlist and 33-man Robertson Trophy watchlists.

VanVleet had been dealing with hamstring issues when he rolled his right ankle. As a result, he saw no more than three minutes of playing time in the season opener against Charleston Southern on November 13. Although VanVleet played in the next game against Tulsa, it aggravated his hamstring enough that he was expected to miss the following few games. Without a healthy VanVleet, Wichita State fell to two games under .500 for the first time since its 2008–09 team as well as endured, not only its first three-game losing streak since having VanVleet come off the bench for the 2012–13 team, but also its worst start to a season (2–4) since the 2007–08 team. He returned to the lineup on December 5 against St. Louis to bring the consecutive losses to an end. For having averages of 13.5 points, 5.0 assists and 4.0 rebounds in two significant wins, one over UNLV on December 9 and another over #25 Utah on December 12, VanVleet claimed Missouri Valley Player of the Week honors on December 14. He earned Player of the Week honors again on January 11 after leading the Shockers to victories over conference co-leaders Evansville and Southern Illinois on January 6 and 9, respectively, with his 11.0 points, 8.5 rebounds, 7.5 assists and 2.5 steals averages. VanVleet's 12 rebounds against Southern Illinois was a career high. He was named to the January 25, 20-man Oscar Robertson Trophy midseason watch list. On January 31, VanVleet made all 15 of his free throw attempts on his way to a career-high 32 points against Evansville. The following day, VanVleet earned his third MVC Player of the Week honor. On February 3, in the 1500th victory in Wichita State Shockers men's basketball history and in head coach Gregg Marshall's school-record-setting 221st victory, VanVleet notched a double-double with 12 points and a career-high-tying 11 assists against Southern Illinois. He was named to the 35-man midseason watchlist for the Naismith Trophy on February 11. VanVleet was included in the Wooden Award Late season Top 20 Watch List on February 12. In the 2016 NCAA Division I men's basketball tournament, VanVleet led the team to victories over Vanderbilt and Arizona. Against Vanderbilt in the First Four round, he and fellow senior Ron Baker led an 11–0 run to break a 30–30 tie on March 15. The pair scored all 11 points in the run and tied with a game-high 14 points. On March 17, VanVleet and Baker led 11-seed Wichita State to a victory over #6 seed and AP poll 17th-ranked Arizona. VanVleet posted a game-high 16 points, five steals and four rebounds. With four steals in his final career game on March 19 against Miami, VanVleet brought his career total to 225, setting a school career record. For the season, he repeated as the MVC in assists per game (5.55) leader for a third time and led the conference in free throw percentage (81.7%).

Following the regular season, VanVleet was named to the Missouri Valley Conference all-league first team (for the third consecutive season) and the MVC Larry Bird Trophy Player of the Year for the second time in three years. He was also an AP All-America honorable mention.

== Professional career ==
=== Toronto Raptors (2016–2023) ===
==== Early years (2016–2018) ====
VanVleet was not selected in the 2016 NBA draft after declining two offers to agree to play in the NBA Development League at annual salaries of $20,000 for two years by teams interested in drafting him in the second round. VanVleet signed to play in the 2016 NBA Summer League with the Toronto Raptors with the expectation that he would be in the Raptors' training camp. His summer league contract had a guarantee of three game appearances. On July 18, VanVleet signed a multi-year deal with the Raptors. At the time of his signing, the Raptors had 14 players entering training camp on guaranteed contracts, including point guards Kyle Lowry, Cory Joseph and Delon Wright. VanVleet was competing with Brady Heslip, Drew Crawford, Yanick Moreira, E. J. Singler and Jarrod Uthoff for the final spot. On October 22, VanVleet remained on the roster when the team cut down to 15 players.

VanVleet made his official league debut on November 9, 2016, playing in only 26 seconds in a 112–102 victory over the Oklahoma City Thunder. VanVleet posted his first two points in the Raptors' 19th game and his fourth appearance, which came against the Los Angeles Lakers on December 2. With Lowry sidelined for a night, VanVleet played with the second unit and posted career highs with 25 minutes and 10 points on January 17 against the Brooklyn Nets. On February 3, he established a new career high with 15 points in a 102–94 loss to the Orlando Magic. During his rookie season, VanVleet had multiple assignments with Raptors 905 of the NBA Development League. He was a member of Raptors 905's championship-winning team in April 2017.

On November 25, 2017, VanVleet posted a career-high 16 points against the Indiana Pacers. Four days later, he had a career-high nine assists in a 126–113 victory over the Charlotte Hornets. VanVleet posted new career highs in points two times during January 2018: first on January against the Cleveland Cavaliers with 22, then on January 28 against the Los Angeles Lakers with 25. On March 7, VanVleet made a long jump shot from the left corner with 1.1 seconds left to break a tie and clinch a 121–119 overtime victory for the Raptors over the Pistons, as well as help Toronto to become the first team to clinch a berth in the 2018 NBA playoffs. VanVleet finished the 2017–18 season averaging 8.6 points, 3.2 assists and 2.4 rebounds in 76 games; he ranked fourth in the NBA in net efficiency per possession behind Stephen Curry, Eric Gordon and Chris Paul and was the only full-time bench player in the top 20 (19th) in the league for plus–minus. VanVleet was subsequently nominated for the Sixth Man of the Year Award.

==== Championship season (2018–2019) ====
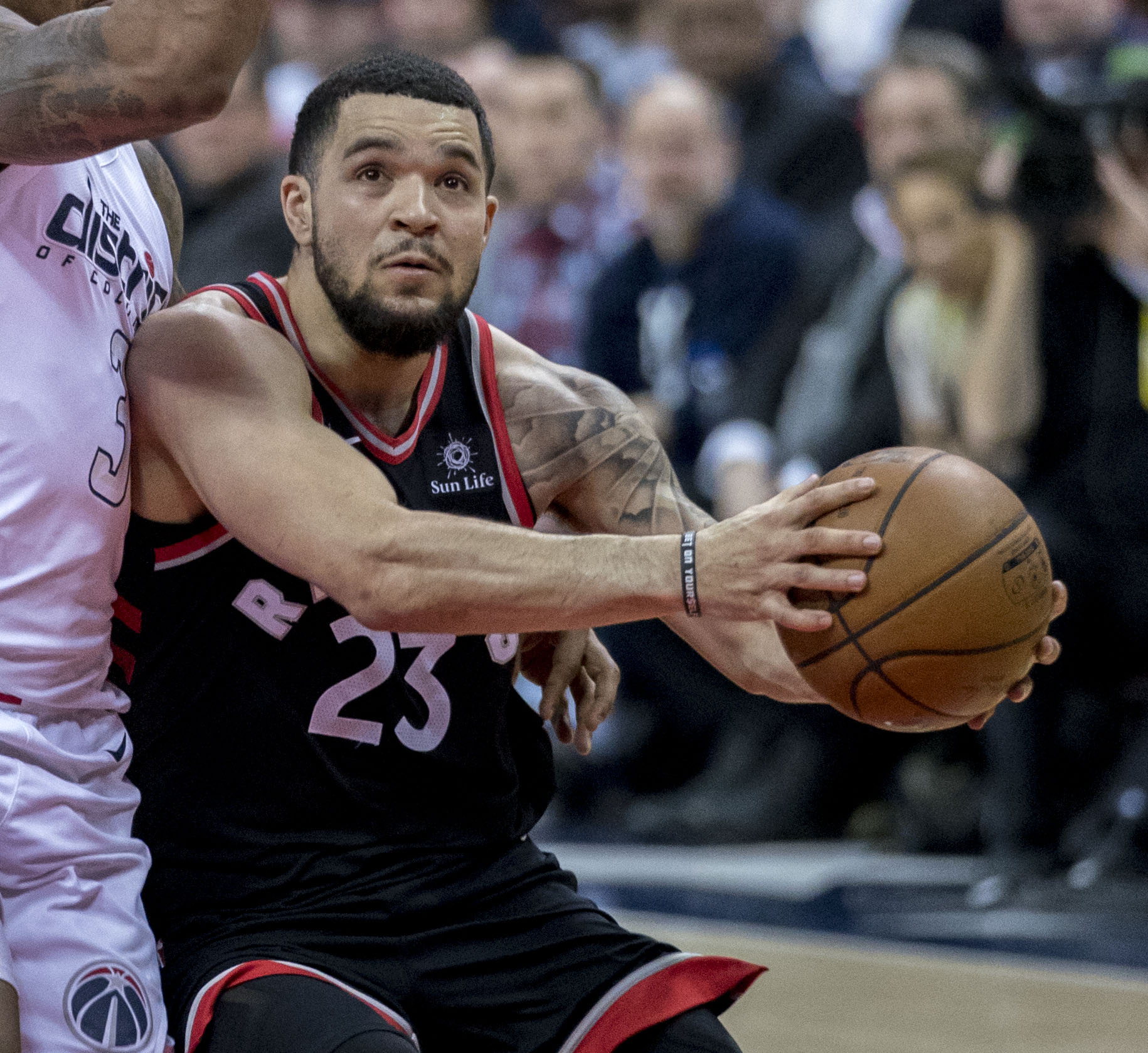
VanVleet with the Raptors in 2018

VanVleet re-signed with the Raptors on July 6, 2018. He scored a season-high 19 points on December 9, 2018, in a 104–99 loss to the Milwaukee Bucks. Two days later, VanVleet had a career-high 14 assists in a 123–99 victory over the Los Angeles Clippers. On December 19, he made a go-ahead three-point shot, with 25 seconds remaining, to cap a 17-point comeback against the Indiana Pacers. On January 5, VanVleet had a season-high-tying 21 points in a 123–116 victory over the Bucks. On February 7, he set a new career high with 30 points in a 119–101 victory over the Atlanta Hawks. VanVleet was ruled out for approximately three weeks in early February with a partial ligament injury to his left thumb, an injury that occurred two nights earlier against the New York Knicks.

The Raptors entered the 2019 NBA playoffs as the number two seed, where VanVleet was an important bench player for the team. After an early post-season shooting slump, during Game 5 of the Eastern Conference Finals against the Bucks, VanVleet scored 21 points on seven three-pointers in a 105–99 victory, helping the Raptors take a 3–2 series lead. In Game 6, he scored 14 points in a 100–94 series-clinching victory over the Bucks, helping the Raptors advance to the NBA Finals for the first time in franchise history. The turnaround happened on May 20 when his son, Fred, Jr. was born on the day between game 3 and game 4. During the 9 playoff games prior to his son's birth he had shot 6–42, including 3–24 on three point shots. In the final 9 playoff games that year he shot 30– 57 (53%) on his three point shots. In the final three games of the Eastern conference finals he shot 14–17 on three-point shots.

VanVleet played an important defensive role against Stephen Curry during the NBA Finals that saw him utilized in a box-and-one defense. In Game 6 of the NBA Finals, VanVleet scored a playoff career-high 22 points with five three-pointers off the bench in a 114–110 series-clinching victory, thus helping the Raptors win their first NBA championship in franchise history. During the finals, he set an NBA Finals record for with 16 three pointers made off the bench, surpassing the previous record of 15 by Robert Horry (2005). He came second place in NBA Finals MVP voting to Kawhi Leonard.

==== Full-time starter (2019–2021) ====
In the season-opener on October 22 against the New Orleans Pelicans, VanVleet scored a career-high 34 points after receiving his first NBA championship ring. On January 4, 2020, VanVleet posted 29 points, including 22 in the second half, and a season-high 11 assists, keying a 16-point comeback victory over the Brooklyn Nets. In the Raptors’ second game returning from the suspension of the season due to the COVID-19 pandemic on August 3, VanVleet scored a career-high 36 points, hitting seven three-pointers, in a 107–103 victory over the Miami Heat in the Orlando bubble. On August 17, he set a trio of playoff career highs in points (30), three-pointers made (8) and assists (11) in a 134–110 victory over the Brooklyn Nets in Game 1 of the Eastern Conference quarter finals in the 2020 NBA Playoff Bubble. In the first three games of the series he compiled 17 made threes. VanVleet became the first Raptors player to record 30 points and 10-plus assists in a playoff game, while also joining Damian Lillard, Stephen Curry and Chris Paul as the only NBA players to record 30-plus points, 10-plus assists and 8-plus three-pointers in a playoff game.

In November 2020, it was announced that VanVleet would remain with the Raptors with a four-year, US$85-million deal. The $85 million contract was the largest ever for an undrafted free agent until Duncan Robinson signed a five-year $90 million deal the following year. On January 4, 2021, VanVleet scored a season-high 35 points, hitting six three-pointers in a 126–114 loss to the Boston Celtics. Two days later, he set a new franchise record with a made three-pointer in 39 straight regular-season games, beating the previous record that was set by C. J. Miles with 38. On February 2, VanVleet scored a career-high 54 points, hitting a career-high 11 three-pointers in a 123–108 victory against the Orlando Magic. He set a franchise record for the most points scored in a game, surpassing DeMar DeRozan's previous record, while also making history for the most points scored by an undrafted NBA player, previously held by Moses Malone with 53. VanVleet also set a franchise record for most three-pointers in the first half, with eight. On April 2, he extended his consecutive regular-season games streak with a made 3-point shot to 76 and left the game against the Golden State Warriors due to a hip flexor injury. On April 8, VanVleet was suspended for one game for leaving the bench during an altercation between the Raptors and the Los Angeles Lakers. When he returned from his six-game injury and one-game suspension, he was held to six points (0-for-6 on three-point shots) by the Orlando Magic ending the streak. The streak included games 23 to 54 (32 games) of the 2019–20 regular season and appearances 1 to 44 (44 games) of the 2020–21 regular season. This excludes the 11 games of the 2020 NBA playoffs in which VanVleet also converted three-point shots.

==== All-Star selection (2021–2023) ====
On November 18, 2021, against the Utah Jazz, VanVleet extended his streak of consecutive games with at least three three-point shots made to eight by making three-point shots on three consecutive possessions. The streak ended the following night against the Sacramento Kings when he only made two. On December 31, 2021, January 2 and January 4, 2022, VanVleet scored 31, 35 and 33 points against the Los Angeles Clippers, New York Knicks and San Antonio Spurs, respectively. This made VanVleet the fourth undrafted player (along with Moses Malone, Mike James and Connie Hawkins) to score 30 or more points in three consecutive games. On January 7, he recorded his first career triple-double with 37 points, 10 rebounds and 10 assists, including 24 points in the third quarter alone, leading Toronto to a 122–108 comeback victory over the Utah Jazz. During the third quarter performance, VanVleet singlehandedly erased a 14-point deficit by scoring 15 unanswered points in a two-minute-27-second span. For Week 12 (January 3–9) of the 2021–22 NBA season, VanVleet was named NBA Eastern Conference Player of the Week for the first time on January 10 for leading the Raptors to a 4–0 record with a 30.3 points, 6.5 assists, 4.8 rebounds, 2.0 steals and 36.5 minutes per game averages. On February 3, VanVleet was named an NBA All-Star for the first time in his career, becoming just the fourth undrafted (modern era) player to make an all-star team, joining John Starks (1994), Ben Wallace (2003–06) and Brad Miller (2003–04), (fifth or sixth if you count Connie Hawkins and/or Moses Malone who were draft eligible when competing leagues existed but were never drafted in the NBA draft). On April 3, 2022, VanVleet broke Kyle Lowry's Raptors record for most 3-pointers in a season (238) vs. the Miami Heat while playing against Lowry as he was on the court. VanVleet finished the season with 242 in 65 games played. He (37.88) finished just behind teammate Pascal Siakam (37.91) for the leadership in minutes played per game over the course of the season. VanVleet suffered a hip flexor injury during Game 4 of the first round of the 2022 NBA playoffs against the Philadelphia 76ers and the Raptors were eliminated in 6 games.

On April 2, 2023, VanVleet recorded a career-high and Raptors-record 20 assists, along with 20 points, five rebounds and three steals in a 128–108 victory over the Charlotte Hornets. He is now the owner of the franchise's single-game record for assists and points. VanVleet also became the only player that is the sole owner of both records for a single franchise. He and Hall of Famer Bob Davies are the only undrafted players in NBA history to register a game with 20-plus points and 20-plus assists.

In June 2023, VanVleet declined his $22.8 million player option to become an unrestricted free agent in the 2023 offseason.

=== Houston Rockets (2023–2026) ===
On July 7, 2023, VanVleet signed with the Houston Rockets. The contract was a three-year deal worth $130 million. On October 26, he debuted for the Rockets, scoring 14 points along with five assists in a 116–86 loss to the Orlando Magic. On December 18, VanVleet tallied 17 assists alongside 27 points and 8 rebounds against in a 135–130 overtime loss to Cleveland. On January 26, 2024, VanVleet marked his third consecutive game with at least 3 blocks with a 6-block effort against Charlotte. Despite being listed as either 6 ft 0 in (1.83 m) or 6 ft 1 in (1.85 m) at various times in his career, he has a knack for statistical "blocks", because he specializes in deflecting the ball as a player is in the motion of shooting before the ball is above the shoulders. Statistically, he is the best in the recorded shot block era at this for his height. On February 23, 2021, he recorded 4 blocks, with two of them being on Joel Embiid who is a foot taller than him. VanVleet would prefer if this type of deflection was recorded as a steal. At over half way into the 2023-24 Houston Rockets season, VanVleet was the team leader in blocked shots. In February 2024, he set the NBA record for most single-season blocked shots by a player listed at 6 ft 0 in (1.83 m) or less. He scored a season-high with 42 points in a game loss against the Utah Jazz. In that game, he made nine three-pointers, added seven rebounds and assists.

On April 28, 2025, VanVleet made 8 three point shots in game 4 of the opening round of the 2025 NBA playoffs against Golden State, tying a franchise playoff record shared by Chris Paul (v. Utah, May 2018), (Matt Maloney) (at Seattle, May 1997) and Jalen Green (five days earlier in game 2 of the same series). VanVleet missed his 12th attempt at the buzzer in the 3 point loss. VanVleet made 18 three point shots in a three game stretch by going 18–27 during games 4 through 6. The best previous three game playoff stretch by a Rocket had seen 16 made by Harden.

On June 25, 2025, VanVleet re-signed with the Rockets on a two-year, $50 million contract. On July 12, VanVleet was elected President of the National Basketball Players Association. On September 22, it was reported that VanVleet had suffered a torn right ACL during an offseason workout, and was ruled out for the entire 2025–26 season.

The return of the Vanvleet from torn ACL tear(2026-present)

Fred Vanvleet is averaging 14.4 points, 2.9 rebounds, and 5.7 assist on career high 43.8% from fg.

== Career statistics ==
Legend
GP	Games played	GS	Games started	MPG	Minutes per game
FG%	Field goal percentage	3P%	3-point field goal percentage	FT%	Free throw percentage
RPG	Rebounds per game	APG	Assists per game	SPG	Steals per game
BPG	Blocks per game	PPG	Points per game	**Bold**	Career high
†	Won an NBA championship

=== NBA ===
==== Regular season ====
Year	Team	GP	GS	MPG	FG%	3P%	FT%	RPG	APG	SPG	BPG	PPG
2016–17	Toronto	37	0	7.9	.351	.379	.818	1.1	.9	.4	.1	2.9
2017–18	Toronto	**76**	0	20.0	**.426**	**.414**	.832	2.4	3.2	.9	.3	8.6
2018–19†	Toronto	64	28	27.5	.410	.378	.843	2.6	4.8	.9	.3	11.0
2019–20	Toronto	54	54	35.7	.418	.392	.848	3.9	6.6	**1.9**	.3	17.6
2020–21	Toronto	52	52	36.5	.389	.366	.885	4.2	6.3	1.7	.7	19.6
2021–22	Toronto	65	65	**37.9**	.403	.377	.874	**4.4**	6.7	1.7	.5	**20.3**
2022–23	Toronto	69	69	36.7	.393	.342	**.898**	4.1	7.2	1.8	.6	19.3
2023–24	Houston	73	**73**	36.8	.416	.387	.860	3.8	**8.1**	1.4	**.8**	17.4
2024–25	Houston	60	60	35.2	.378	.345	.810	3.7	5.6	1.6	.4	14.1
Career		550	401	31.3	.401	.371	.862	3.4	5.7	1.4	.5	14.9
All-Star		1	0	9.0	.500	.500	—	2.0	3.0	.0	.0	6.0

==== Playoffs ====
Year	Team	GP	GS	MPG	FG%	3P%	FT%	RPG	APG	SPG	BPG	PPG
2017	Toronto	7	0	4.1	**.667**	.400	–	.1	.6	.1	.0	2.0
2018	Toronto	6	1	19.0	.333	.286	.875	1.7	2.2	.0	.0	6.8
2019†	Toronto	**24**	0	24.7	.392	.388	.774	1.8	2.6	.8	.3	8.0
2020	Toronto	11	**11**	39.1	.399	.391	.840	**4.4**	**6.9**	1.6	.6	**19.6**
2022	Toronto	4	4	35.0	.352	.333	.833	3.0	6.3	**1.8**	**1.0**	13.8
2025	Houston	7	7	**40.0**	.430	**.435**	**1.000**	4.1	4.4	1.0	.3	18.7
Career		59	23	26.9	.397	.383	.862	2.4	3.6	.9	.3	11.0

=== College ===
Year	Team	GP	GS	MPG	FG%	3P%	FT%	RPG	APG	SPG	BPG	PPG
2012–13	Wichita State	**39**	0	16.2	.386	.408	.725	1.8	2.3	.9	**.1**	4.3
2013–14	Wichita State	36	**36**	**31.7**	**.484**	**.418**	**.830**	3.9	5.4	**1.9**	**.1**	11.6
2014–15	Wichita State	35	35	31.5	.430	.357	.796	**4.5**	5.2	**1.9**	**.1**	**13.6**
2015–16	Wichita State	31	31	29.0	.390	.381	.817	3.2	**5.5**	1.8	**.1**	12.2
Career		141	102	26.8	.426	.386	.805	3.3	4.5	1.6	.1	10.2

=== Records ===
NBA

- Single-game points by an undrafted player (54)
- Only player to hold single-game records for points and assists for a franchise outright without any ties (54 points and 20 assists for the Raptors)
- Three points shots made in an NBA Finals off the bench (16)
- Single-season blocked shots by a player listed at 6 ft 0 in (1.83 m) or less (59)

Raptors

- Single-game points (54)
- Single-game assists (20)
- Single-season three-point shots made (242)
- Single-half three-point shots made (8)
- Consecutive regular-season games within a single season with three-point shot made (44)
- Consecutive regular-season games to start a season with three-point shot made (44)
- Consecutive regular-season games with three-point shot made (76)
- Consecutive regular season and playoff games with three-point shot made (87)

Rockets

- Single playoff game three-point shots made (8, shared with Jalen Green, Matt Maloney and Chris Paul)

Missouri Valley Conference

- Single-MVC tournament three-point shots made without a miss (3, tied)

Wichita

- Career steals (225)
- Career assists (637)
- Career assist:turnover ratio (3.08)
- Career games played (141)
- Single-game steals (7, tied)
- Single-game free throws made without a miss (15, tied)
- Junior season steals (66)
- Sophomore season steals (69)
- Sophomore season steals/game (1.92)
- Sophomore season minutes played (1141)
- Single NCAA tournament game steals (5)
- Single NCAA tournament steals (11)
- Single NCAA tournament assists (35)
- Career NCAA tournament steals (26)
- Career NCAA tournament games played (13, tied)
- Career NCAA tournament free throws made/attempted (48/57)
- Career NCAA tournament assists (51)

== National team career ==
VanVleet was among the 22 players selected to try out for the 12-man Team USA at the 2015 Pan American Games. He was among the 16 finalists for the team, but he did not make the final roster.

== Personal life ==
VanVleet is biracial; his father was black and his mother is white. He has a daughter who was born on January 29, 2018. On May 20, 2019, his son was born during the Raptors Eastern Conference Finals series against the Milwaukee Bucks. VanVleet also has a brother named Darnell. He also has a step brother J.D. Darnell played basketball at Illinois Central College and J.D. played at Ashford University of Iowa.

VanVleet was a sociology major at Wichita State.

== Podcast ==
In conjunction with Acast, VanVleet launched the "Bet On Yourself" podcast, premiering on November 3, 2021. Season 1 was advertised to feature conversations about perseverance, struggles, and success with up-and-coming Black, Indigenous, People of Color (BIPOC) entrepreneurs in Canada.

== See also ==
- List of NBA single-game 3-point field goal leaders
- List of NBA single-season 3-point scoring leaders
- Toronto Raptors accomplishments and records
