= James Whitcomb Riley High School =

Public school in Indiana, United States

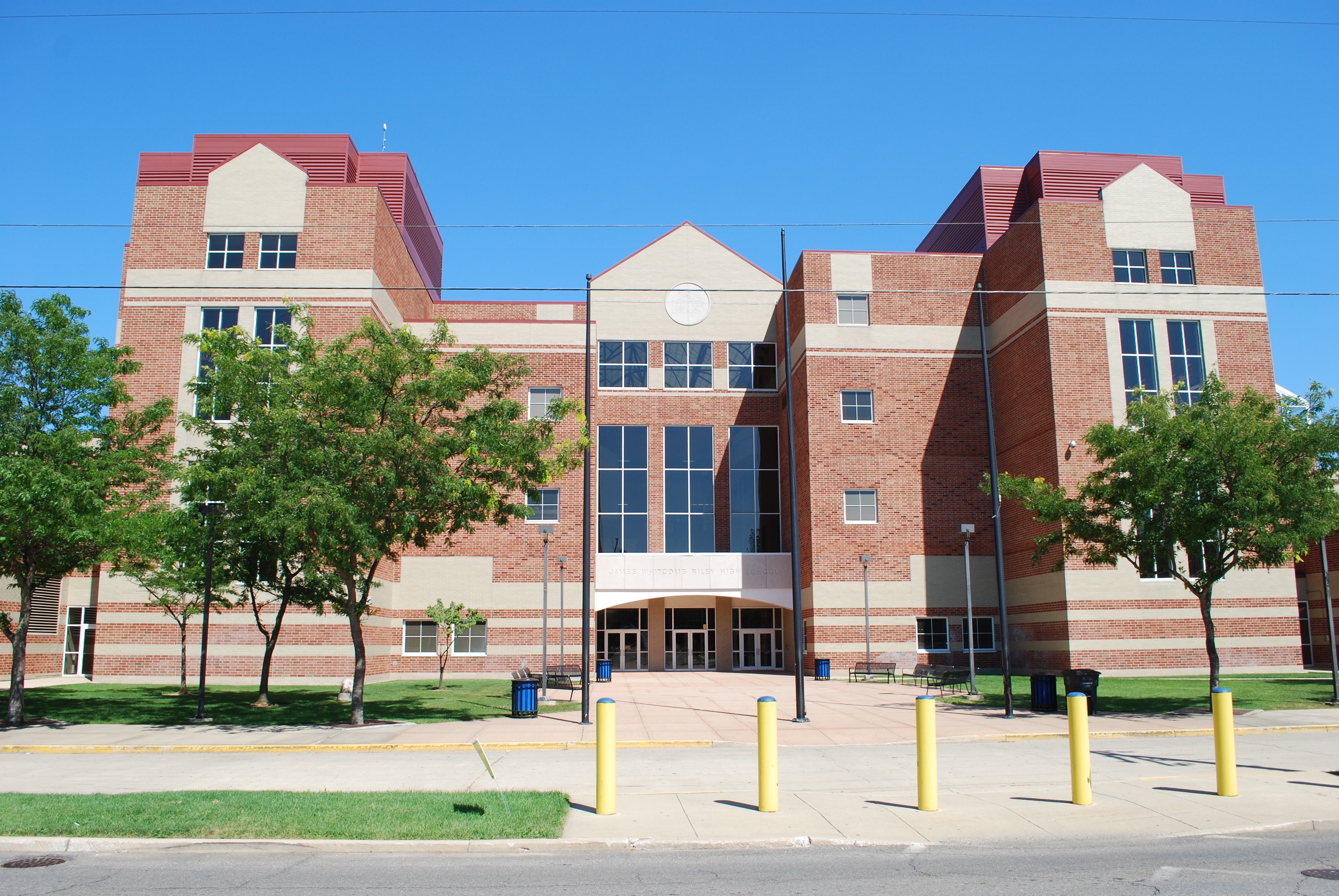

Location
- 1902 Fellows Street; South Bend, St. Joseph County, Indiana 46618; United States; 41°39′16″N 86°14′36″W

Information
- Type: Public high school
- Established: 1924 – old Riley; 2000 – new Riley
- School district: South Bend Community School Corporation (SBCSC)
- Principal: Shawn Henderson
- Nickname: Riley
- Teaching staff: 88.03 (FTE)
- Grades: 9–12
- Enrollment: 998 (2023–2024)
- Student to teacher ratio: 11.34
- Campus: Urban
- Colors: Blue and gold (Original colors: purple and gold, when Riley HS which was purple and gold combined with Jackson High School which was blue and white in Fall of 1975, they kept the gold from Riley and the blue from Jackson )
- Slogan: Pride of the South Side (created by Ed Bradford)
- Athletics conference: Northern Indiana Athletic Conference
- Team name: Wildcats
- Newspaper: The Riley Review
- Website: riley.sb.school

James Whitcomb Riley High School is a high school in South Bend, Indiana; serving most of the city's south side. The school is named in honor of the "Hoosier Poet", James Whitcomb Riley. The school is operated by South Bend Community School Corporation and governed by the SBSC's Board of School Trustees.

== Boys swimming ==
The Men's swim team at Riley, is the most successful athletic program in the South Bend Community School Corporation. Founded in 1952 it has had dozens of swimmers win individual state titles and be named All-Americans.

=== State titles ===
The Men's swim team at Riley, is the most successful athletic program in the South Bend Community School Corporation, with 7 State titles (1955–56, 1956–57, 1957–58, 1961–62,1977–78, 1985–86, 1994–95), and 7 State-Runner Titles (1960–61, 1975–76, 1978–79, 1979–80, 1982–83, 2001–02, 2002–03).

=== Sectional titles ===
Along with their state titles the team has won 30 Sectional titles (1975–76, 1977–78, 1980–81, 1981–82, 1982–83, 1983–84, 1985–86, 1986–87, 1987–88, 1988–89, 1989–90, 1990–91, 1991–92, 1992–93, 1993–94, 1994–95, 1995–96, 1996–97, 1997–98, 1998–99, 1999–00, 2000–01, 2001–02, 2002–03, 2005–06, 2006–07, 2008–09, 2016–17, 2017–18, 2022–23)

=== Conference titles ===
They Riley High School Boys Swim team has also won an additional 31 Northern Indiana Conference titles (1955–56, 1256–57, 1957–58, 1960–61, 1961–62, 1975–76, 1976–77, 1977–78, 1981–82, 1982–83, 1983–84, 1984–85, 1985–86, 1986–87, 1987–88, 1988–89, 1989–90, 1990–91, 1991–92, 1992–93, 1993–94, 1994–95, 1995–96, 1996–97, 1999–00, 2001–02, 2002–03, 2003–04, 2005–06, 2006–07, 2016–17).

=== City titles ===
Since the start of the S.B.C.S.C City Championship Riley has accumulated 35 City titles (1955–56, 1961–62, 1975–76, 1976–77, 1977–78, 1989–90, 1990–91, 1991–92, 1992–93, 1993–94, 1994–95, 1995–96, 1996–97, 1997–98, 1998–99, 1999–00, 2000–01, 2001–02, 2002–03, 2003–04, 2004–05, 2005–06, 2006–07, 2007–08, 2008–09, 2009–10, 2014–15, 2015–16, 2016–17, 2017–18, 2018–19, 2019–20, 2020–21, 2021–22, 2022–23).

=== Win–loss record ===
Since the start of the 2001–02 and to the end of the 2019–2020 season the team has accumulated a win–loss record of 222–42–1.

== Girls basketball ==
In the early 2000s, Riley experienced some success in girls basketball being the 4-A state runner-up in 2002 and semi state runner-up in 2003. Since then, they have accumulated a win–loss record of 30–143 from the 2006–2014 seasons.

== Good Morning America ==
On September 30, 2020, the national morning news show Good Morning America came to Riley to bring awareness to schools and learning during the COVID-19 pandemic. ABC News Correspondent Will Reeve along with GMA donated a $20,000 grant in partnership with Donor's Choose, and 1200 WiFi-Hotspots for five years in partnership with AT&T.

== Notable alumni ==
- Joe Domnanovich – American football center
- Ron Dunlap – politician
- Fred Evans – American football running back
- Larry Karaszewski – screenwriter
- Steve Nemeth – American football quarterback
- Jonathan Pollard – spy
- Bob Rush – professional baseball pitcher
- Javon Small – basketball player
- Pamela Gaye Walker – actress, writer, director
- Jackie Walorski – politician, former U.S. Representative in Indiana's 2nd congressional district
- Daniel Waters – screenwriter
- Mark Waters – screenwriter
- Doug Wead – political commentator and writer
- Blake Wesley – professional basketball player
- Marcus Wilson – professional basketball player
- Tom Wukovits – professional basketball player

== See also ==
- List of high schools in Indiana
