= Marcus Wilson (basketball) =

Businessman, former professional basketball player, former coach

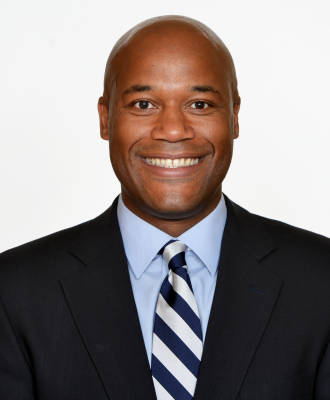

Personal information
- Born: August 8, 1977 (age 49) Indiana, U.S.
- Listed height: 6 ft 3 in (1.91 m)

Career information
- High school: James Whitcomb Riley (South Bend, Indiana, U.S.)
- College: Evansville (1995–1999)
- Playing career: 1999–2010
- Position: Shooting guard

Career history

Playing
- 1999: Komfort Sargard
- 2000: Hapoel Holon
- 2001: Popolare Ragusa
- 2001–2002: AS Bondy
- 2002–2002: BSG Bremerhaven
- 2003–2004: Reims
- 2004–2005: BCM Gravelines-Dunkerque
- 2005: Spirou Charleroi
- 2005–2006: Tuborg Pilsener Izmir
- 2006–2007: JL Bourg Basket
- 2007: Cartersville Warriors
- 2007: Stal Ostrów Wielkopolski
- 2007–2008: Boston Blizzard
- 2008: BC Odesa
- 2008–2009: CB Tarragona
- 2010: Beirasar Rosalia
- 2010: Leyma Coruña

Coaching
- 2013–2016: Saint Louis (assistant)
- 2022–2023: Evansville (assistant)

Career highlights
- MVC Player of the Year (1999); 2× First-team All-MVC (1998, 1999); Second-team All-MVC (1997)

Marcus Dwayne Wilson (born August 8, 1977) is an American basketball coach and former player. He played college basketball for the University of Evansville before playing professionally in Europe, South America and the United States.

In college, Wilson set several NCAA Division I records while playing for the Purple Aces from 1995 to 1999. In 2008 was inducted into the University of Evansville Hall of Fame. In 2007, Wilson was voted to the Missouri Valley Conference Top 50 Greatest Players. In 2005, Wilson was named to the University of Evansville's All Time Greastest Players.

== Early life ==
Wilson is the youngest of 15 children and graduated from James Whitcomb Riley High School. He was an all-state selection on the 1995 Indiana High School Basketball Coaches Association team, as well as first-team all-state by the Bloomington Herald, all-conference and all-sectional selection. Wilson earned a scholarship to play at the University of Evansville.

== Collegiate career ==
Wilson is the 4th leading scorer in the history in the University of Evansville, with 2053 points scored. He is the 3rd leading scorer in the history of the school since they joined Division I athletics (Evansville was Division II until joining Division I athletics in 1977). As a freshman, he produced the fifth highest free throw percentage in school history at 88.2 percent, which was seventh best among all Division 1 players that season.

As a sophomore, Wilson was second team all-Missouri Valley Conference (MVC) and during that season made 48 consecutive free throws which places him tied for 14th in the history of the NCAA Division I men's basketball in consecutive free throws made. Wilson's free throw percentage of 90.1% was 4th in the nation among all Division 1 players. As a sophomore, he led the Aces in field goals, three-point field goals, free throws, free throw attempts and co-leader in steals.

He averaged 18.4 points in MVC games and his streak of 48 free throws in a row between December 1 and February 2 is a UE record. As a junior in 1997–98, Wilson was first team all-MVC averaging 18.3 points per game and was one of three captains. He was also a captain as a senior in 1998–99, and led the MVC in free throw percentage and 3 point percentage.

Wilson finished 3rd in the nation in ft% and 12th in 3pt%. He finished 9th in the country in total points scored with 682. He also set an NCAA men's Division I record for most 3 point shots made without a miss in a game, going 9 for 9 from behind the arc against the University of Tennessee Martin. Wilson was named the MVC Player of the Year in 1999. He also led the Purple Aces to their first and only MVC title in 1999. In the first round of the NCAA tournament, Wilson scored 34 points against Kansas in the SuperDome in New Orleans. After "Marcus Wilson put on an absolute show in the first half", scoring 18 points in the first 8 minutes of the loss.

Wilson's career free throw percentage in college was 88.7%, placing him 9th in that category in the history of college basketball. He was inducted into the University of Evansville Hall of Fame in 2007. Wilson had his #5 University of Evansville jersey retired in 2018.

Wilson graduated from the University of Evansville in 1999, with a Bachelor of Arts Degree in Business Administration.

== Professional basketball and coaching ==
Wilson had an 11-year professional career that began in 1999 with the Utah Jazz in the Rocky Mountain Revue Summer League. In 2001, Wilson signed with French club AS Bondy, where he led the second-tier LNB Pro B league in scoring the last two months of the 2001 season and the entire 2001–2002 season. In 2002–2003 Wilson played with German club Bremerhaven where he earned the name "Mr. Perfect" by going 15–15 from the field (11–11 from 3's, 4–4 from 2's, and 2–2 ft's) tallying 43 points in only 20 minutes.

In 2003–2004 season, Wilson returned to France, joining top division LNB Pro A side Reims Club Basket where he finished 3rd in the league in scoring at 19.6 points per game. Next season, 2004–2005, he played in France with Gravelines, also in LNB Pro A, where he averaged 16.4 points per game. That season, Wilson also averaged 15.7 points per game in the ULEB CUP, while shooting 44% from behind the arc, highlighted by a 30-point performance in Podgorica, Montenegro against KK Budućnost Podgorica.

Also at the end of the 2004–2005 season, Wilson signed a contract with another ULEB team, Spirou Charleroi in Belgium to finish the remaining eight games where he helped them secure the league title. In the 2007–2008 season, Wilson signed in the Ukrainian Superleague, with BC Odesa mid year where he helped the team from falling out of the first division by averaging 20.5 points per game and 5.0 rebounds during his stint with the team to finish the season. The following season, 2008–2009, Wilson signed in Tarragona, Spain, with CB Tarragona where he led his team in scoring averaging 15.1 points a game leading his team to the league finals and moving up to LEB Oro Spain.

In 2005 and 2006 while playing in Izmir, Turkey, Wilson joined leukemia specialist Hale Ören to sponsor children suffering from leukemia in the local hospital of Dokuz Eylül University. In 2010, Wilson announced his retirement from professional basketball.

In August 2013, after working in executive-level positions at Aaron's Sales and Lease and Chick-fil-a, Wilson joined the men's basketball staff at Saint Louis University as the video coordinator. In the 2013–14 season, the Billikens won 19 games in a row reaching #8 in the Coaches Poll, won the Atlantic 10 regular season conference title and received a 5 seed in the NCAA tournament, defeating NC State in the first round, and losing to Louisville in the round of 32. Wilson remained on staff at SLU until 2016 when he began leadership roles in non-profit organizations in St. Louis, Missouri.

He later returned to Evansville as an assistant coach, leaving in 2022.

== Business career and public speaking ==
After executive level jobs at Aaron's Sales and Lease, Chick-Fil-A and three years on the basketball coaching staff at Saint Louis University, in May 2016, Wilson began as Executive Director at the Monsanto Family YMCA, and has received recognition for his work serving inner city St. Louis. In 2017, Wilson was recognized by KMOV news in St. Louis as a Community Hero which featured his work initiating a mentorship based basketball program. He was featured again in 2018 by St. Louis Public Radio for his continued work with the program.

In February 2018, he was named Community Hero of the Month by The St. Louis American. In February 2019, Wilson was acknowledged and awarded by iHeart Media as a 'Community Trailblazer' in St. Louis. Wilson served as Chair of the Gateway Region YMCA DIG(Diversity, Inclusion & Global) Committee and in 2019, Wilson was named a Delux Magazine Power 100 recipient, which honors 100 of the most influential African American business leaders in St. Louis.

In 2017, Wilson began working with ESPN3 as a color commentator through the University of Evansville announcing men's basketball games. He continues to work with ESPN3 and ESPN+ as a color commentator with the University of Evansville and the Missouri Valley Conference.

Wilson expanded his public speaking and has presented to or been the keynote speaker at Centene Corporation, Boys Hope Girls Hope, Youth University graduation (Washington University), the University of Evansville, Mt. Vernon(IL) HS, among others. He has also served on community panel discussions at Soldan High School on life in the inner city, and at University of Missouri St Louis on the future of St. Louis.

== Accomplishments ==
- Named to the Missouri Valley Conference All-Newcomer Team while leading his team in scoring as a freshman
- Ranked 4th nationally in free throw percentage (90.1%)
- Made 48 consecutive free throws which is 14th longest in NCAA history
- 3-time all-Missouri Valley Conference; 2-time First Team; All-American (1999)
- 1999 Missouri Valley Conference Player of the Year
- In 1999 led MVC Conference in free throw and 3-point percentage, ranking 3rd and 12th respectively nationally
- Tied the NCAA record for most 3 pointers made in a game without a miss, going 9 for 9
- Ninth best career free throw percentage in the history of Division 1 NCAA Men's Basketball
- Named to the University of Evansville All-Time Team
- Named to the Missouri Valley All Time Greatest 50 Greatest Team
- Inducted into the University of Evansville Hall of Fame
