= Seth Tuttle =

American basketball player (born 1992)

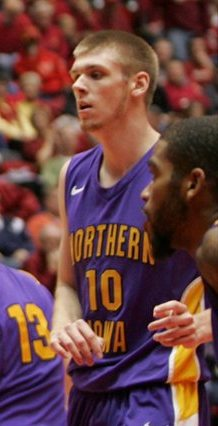
- Tuttle playing for Northern Iowa

Northern Iowa Panthers
- Title: Assistant coach
- League: Missouri Valley Conference

Personal information
- Born: September 5, 1992 (age 34) Mason City, Iowa, U.S.
- Listed height: 6 ft 8 in (2.03 m)
- Listed weight: 240 lb (109 kg)

Career information
- High school: West Fork (Sheffield, Iowa)
- College: Northern Iowa (2011–2015)
- NBA draft: 2015: undrafted
- Playing career: 2015–2018
- Position: Power forward / small forward
- Number: 8, 10
- Coaching career: 2018–present

Career history

Playing
- 2015–2016: s.Oliver Baskets
- 2016–2017: Limburg United
- 2017–2018: Spirou Charleroi

Coaching
- 2018–2021: Northern Iowa (GA/VC)
- 2021–present: Northern Iowa (assistant)

Career highlights
- Belgian League All-Defensive Team (2018); Belgian League Star of the Coaches (2017); Consensus second-team All-American (2015); MVC Player of the Year (2015); 2× First-team All-MVC (2014, 2015); MVC tournament MVP (2015); MVC Freshman of the Year (2012)

Seth Tuttle (born September 5, 1992) is an American former basketball player and current assistant coach for the Northern Iowa Panthers. He had an All-American college career at Northern Iowa (UNI). Tuttle was considered one of the top college players in the country, and was a midseason finalist for the Naismith College Player of the Year award.

== College career ==
Tuttle, a 6-foot-8-inch (2.03 m) forward from West Fork High School in Sheffield, Iowa, came to UNI in 2011. He chose the Panthers over larger schools such as Iowa, Iowa State and Wisconsin after leading West Fork to four straight conference titles. In his first season, he became the first freshman in Missouri Valley Conference (MVC) history to lead the league in field goal percentage (.652) and was named the conference Freshman of the Year. In his junior season, he became one of the top players in the MVC, averaging 15.4 points and 8.0 rebounds per game. He was named first-team All-MVC.

In Tuttle's senior season, he was named to the preseason All-MVC team. After leading the Panthers to a 24–2 start and a national ranking, Tuttle was named one of 30 finalists nationally for the Naismith College Player of the Year award, and one of 10 finalists for the John R. Wooden Award.

== Professional career ==
In June 2015 Tuttle signed to play for the Miami Heat in the NBA Summer League. On July 24 he signed an annual contract with s.Oliver Baskets of the Basketball Bundesliga.

On July 27, 2016, Limburg United of the Basketball League Belgium Division I announced that they had signed Tuttle for the 2016–17 season.

On June 6, 2017, Tuttle was announced by Spirou Charleroi.

== Coaching career ==
In 2018, Tuttle returned to his alma mater, Northern Iowa, joining the coaching staff as a graduate assistant. Prior to the 2020–21 season, he was promoted to video coordinator. He served in that position for one season before he was again promoted to an assistant coach.
