= Creighton Bluejays men's basketball statistical leaders =

The Creighton Bluejays basketball statistical leaders are individual statistical leaders of the Creighton Bluejays basketball program in various categories, including points, rebounds, assists, steals, and blocks. Within those areas, the lists identify single-game, single-season, and career leaders. The Bluejays represent Creighton University in the NCAA Division I Big East Conference.

Creighton began competing in intercollegiate basketball in 1916. However, the school's record book does not generally list records from before the 1950s, as records from before this period are often incomplete and inconsistent. Since scoring was much lower in this era, and teams played much fewer games during a typical season, it is likely that few or no players from this era would appear on these lists anyway.

The NCAA did not officially record assists as a stat until the 1983–84 season, and blocks and steals until the 1985–86 season, but Creighton's record books includes players in these stats before these seasons.

These lists are updated through Creighton's 2023-24 season.

== Scoring ==
Career
Rk	Player	Points	Seasons
1	Doug McDermott	3,150	2010–11 2011–12 2012–13 2013–14
2	Ryan Kalkbrenner	2,443	2020–21 2021–22 2022–23 2023-24 2024-25
3	Rodney Buford	2,116	1995–96 1996–97 1997–98 1998–99
4	Bob Harstad	2,110	1987–88 1988–89 1989–90 1990–91
5	Chad Gallagher	1,983	1987–88 1988–89 1989–90 1990–91
6	Bob Portman	1,876	1966–67 1967–68 1968–69
7	Kyle Korver	1,801	1999–00 2000–01 2001–02 2002–03
8	Nate Funk	1,754	2002–03 2003–04 2004–05 2005–06 2006–07
9	Rick Apke	1,682	1974–75 1975–76 1976–77 1977–78
10	Paul Silas	1,661	1961–62 1962–63 1963–64

Season
Rk	Player	Points	Season
1	Doug McDermott	934	2013–14
2	Doug McDermott	834	2012–13
3	Doug McDermott	801	2011–12
4	Bob Portman	738	1967–68
5	Bob Harstad	734	1989–90
6	Benoit Benjamin	688	1984–85
7	Bob Portman	681	1968–69
8	Ryan Kalkbrenner	672	2024-25
9	Vernon Moore	671	1984–85
10	Marcus Foster	654	2017–18

Single game
Rk	Player	Points	Season	Opponent
1	Bob Portman	51	1967–68	UW-Milwaukee
2	Ryan Kalkbrenner	49	2024–25	UT Rio Grande Valley
3	Eddie Cole	47	1954–55	Morningside
4	Bob Portman	46	1968–69	Weber State
5	Tim Powers	45	1965–66	Idaho State
	Benoit Benjamin	45	1984–85	Indiana State
	Doug McDermott	45	2013–14	Providence
8	Doug McDermott	44	2011–12	Bradley
9	Bob Portman	43	1967–68	Kansas State
	Benoit Benjamin	43	1984–85	Southern Illinois

== Rebounds ==
Career
Rk	Player	Rebounds	Seasons
1	Paul Silas	1,751	1961–62 1962–63 1963–64
2	Ryan Kalkbrenner	1,146	2020–21 2021–22 2022–23 2023-24 2024-25
3	Bob Harstad	1,126	1987–88 1988–89 1989–90 1990–91
4	Doug McDermott	1,088	2010–11 2011–12 2012–13 2013–14
5	Benoit Benjamin	1,005	1982–83 1983–84 1984–85
6	Bob Portman	979	1966–67 1967–68 1968–69
7	Chad Gallagher	891	1987–88 1988–89 1989–90 1990–91
8	Kenny Lawson Jr.	762	2006–07 2007–08 2008–09 2009–10 2010–11
9	Rodney Buford	716	1995–96 1996–97 1997–98 1998–99
10	Rick Apke	709	1974–75 1975–76 1976–77 1977–78

Season
Rk	Player	Rebounds	Season
1	Paul Silas	631	1963–64
2	Paul Silas	563	1961–62
3	Paul Silas	557	1962–63
4	Benoit Benjamin	451	1984–85
5	Bob Portman	385	1967–68
6	Dick Hartman	362	1959–60
7	Gregory Brandon	332	1983–84
8	George Morrow	330	1980–81
9	Elton McGriff	317	1964–65
10	Baylor Scheierman	315	2023-24

Single game
Rk	Player	Rebounds	Season	Opponent
1	Paul Silas	38	1961–62	Centenary
2	Paul Silas	37	1962–63	Tennessee State
	Paul Silas	37	1962–63	Colorado College
4	Paul Silas	36	1963–64	Marquette
5	Paul Silas	35	1961–62	Wabash
6	Paul Silas	33	1963–64	UCLA
7	Paul Silas	31	1963–64	Arizona State
	Paul Silas	31	1963–64	Nevada
9	Paul Silas	30	1962–63	La Salle
10	Paul Silas	29	1961–62	Colorado College
	Paul Silas	29	1961–62	North Dakota
	Paul Silas	29	1962–63	Clemson

== Assists ==
Career
Rk	Player	Assists	Seasons
1	Ryan Sears	570	1997–98 1998–99 1999–00 2000–01
2	Ralph Bobik	549	1971–72 1972–73 1973–74
3	Antoine Young	505	2008–09 2009–10 2010–11 2011–12
4	Grant Gibbs	498	2011–12 2012–13 2013–14
5	Austin Chatman	493	2011–12 2012–13 2013–14 2014–15
6	Randy Eccker	458	1974–75 1975–76 1976–77 1977–78
7	Tyler McKinney	430	2001–02 2002–03 2003–04 2004–05
8	Vernon Moore	418	1981–82 1982–83 1983–84 1984–85
9	Maurice Watson Jr.	391	2015–16 2016–17
10	Marcus Zegarowski	389	2018–19 2019–20 2020–21

Season
Rk	Player	Assists	Season
1	Ralph Bobik	252	1973–74
2	Steven Ashworth	239	2024–25
3	Maurice Watson Jr.	229	2015–16
4	Grant Gibbs	210	2012–13
5	Randy Eccker	205	1976–77
6	Antoine Young	195	2010–11
7	Tyler McKinney	184	2004–05
8	Grant Gibbs	176	2011–12
9	Ryan Nembhard	176	2022–23
10	Ryan Sears	175	1999–00

Single game
Rk	Player	Assists	Season	Opponent
1	Ralph Bobik	17	1972–73	St. Francis (Pa.)
	Ralph Bobik	17	1973–74	Bradley
3	Ralph Bobik	16	1973–74	BYU
4	Maurice Watson Jr.	14	2015–16	Seton Hall
	Maurice Watson Jr.	14	2016–17	Providence
6	Latrell Wrightsell	13	1991–92	Nebraska
	Jason Bey	13	1994–95	Southern Illinois
	Maurice Watson Jr.	13	2016–17	Akron
	Maurice Watson Jr.	13	2016–17	Washington St.
	Nik Graves	13	2025–26	Butler

== Steals ==
Career
Rk	Player	Steals	Seasons
1	Ryan Sears	283	1997–98 1998–99 1999–00 2000–01
2	Josh Dotzler	196	2005–06 2006–07 2007–08 2008–09
3	Rodney Buford	195	1995–96 1996–97 1997–98 1998–99
4	Duan Cole	186	1987–88 1988–89 1989–90 1990–91 1991–92
5	Kyle Korver	172	1999–00 2000–01 2001–02 2002–03
6	Johnny Mathies	157	2003–04 2004–05 2005–06
7	Latrell Wrightsell	154	1988–89 1989–90 1990–91 1991–92
8	Vernon Moore	150	1981–82 1982–83 1983–84 1984–85
9	Ben Walker	148	1997–98 1998–99 1999–00 2000–01
10	Khyri Thomas	141	2015–16 2016–17 2017–18

Season
Rk	Player	Steals	Season
1	Ryan Sears	80	1999–00
2	Ryan Sears	73	2000–01
3	Latrell Wrightsell	72	1991–92
4	Duan Cole	70	1991–92
	Josh Dotzler	70	2008–09
6	Ryan Sears	68	1998–99
7	James Farr	63	1987–88
8	Ryan Sears	62	1997–98
9	Rodney Buford	59	1998–99
	Johnny Mathies	59	2004–05

Single game
Rk	Player	Steals	Season	Opponent
1	Michael Johnson	9	1981–82	Saint Joseph’s (Pa.)
2	Latrell Wrightsell	8	1990–91	Drake
	Latrell Wrightsell	8	1990–91	Drake
4	Charles Butler	7	1974–75	Wake Forest
	Vernon Moore	7	1984–85	Southern
	James Farr	7	1987–88	Iowa State
	Rodney Buford	7	1996–97	UMKC
	Rodney Buford	7	1997–98	Missouri State
	Anthony Tolliver	7	2005–06	Evansville
	Johnny Mathies	7	2005–06	Indiana State
	P’Allen Stinnett	7	2008–09	Southern

== Blocks ==
Career
Rk	Player	Blocks	Seasons
1	Benoit Benjamin	411	1982–83 1983–84 1984–85
2	Ryan Kalkbrenner	399	2020–21 2021–22 2022–23 2023–24 2024–25
3	Chad Gallagher	183	1987–88 1988–89 1989–90 1990–91
4	Gregory Echenique	174	2010–11 2011–12 2012–13
5	Kenny Lawson Jr.	153	2006–07 2007–08 2008–09 2009–10 2010–11
6	Brody Deren	138	2001–02 2002–03 2003–04
7	Anthony Tolliver	136	2003–04 2004–05 2005–06 2006–07
8	Doug Swenson	109	1997–98 1998–99
9	Joe Dabbert	104	2000–01 2001–02 2002–03 2003–04
10	Christian Bishop	82	2018–19 2019–20 2020–21

Season
Rk	Player	Blocks	Season
1	Benoit Benjamin	162	1984–85
2	Benoit Benjamin	157	1983–84
3	Ryan Kalkbrenner	107	2023–24
4	Ryan Kalkbrenner	93	2024–25
5	Benoit Benjamin	92	1982–83
6	Ryan Kalkbrenner	89	2021–22
7	Ryan Kalkbrenner	72	2022–23
8	Chad Gallagher	70	1990–91
9	Chad Gallagher	62	1989–90
	Gregory Echenique	62	2012–13

Single game
Rk	Player	Blocks	Season	Opponent
1	Benoit Benjamin	12	1984–85	Bradley
2	Benoit Benjamin	11	1983–84	Tulsa
3	Benoit Benjamin	10	1983–84	Nebraska Omaha
	Benoit Benjamin	10	1983–84	Illinois State
	Benoit Benjamin	10	1984–85	Southern Illinois
6	Benoit Benjamin	9	1983–84	West Texas A&M
7	Benoit Benjamin	8	1983–84	Iowa State
	Benoit Benjamin	8	1984–85	Chaminade
	Benoit Benjamin	8	1984–85	Tulsa
	Doug Swenson	8	1998–99	UMKC
	Ryan Kalkbrenner	8	2023–24	St. John's
