= Creighton Bluejays =

Intercollegiate athletics teams of Creighton University

- University: Creighton University
- Conference: Big East
- NCAA: Division I
- Athletic director: Marcus Blossom
- Location: Omaha, Nebraska
- Varsity teams: 14
- Basketball arena: CHI Health Center Omaha (men's); D. J. Sokol Arena (women's)
- Baseball stadium: Charles Schwab Field Omaha
- Soccer stadium: Morrison Stadium
- Mascot: Billy Bluejay
- Nickname: Bluejays, Jays, CU
- Fight song: The White and the Blue
- Colors: Blue, white, and navy blue
- Website: gocreighton.com
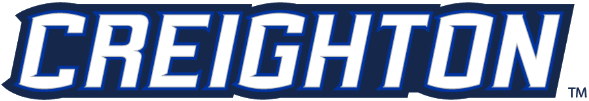

The Creighton Bluejays, or Jays, are the athletic teams that represent Creighton University, a Jesuit/Catholic University in Omaha, Nebraska, United States. They compete in NCAA Division I in the Big East Conference.

== Sports sponsored ==
Men's sports	Women's sports
Baseball	Basketball
Basketball	Cross country
Cross country	Golf
Golf	Rowing
Soccer	Soccer
Tennis	Softball
	Tennis
	Volleyball

=== Baseball ===
Creighton's baseball team played its first Big East season in 2014. They are coached by Ed Servais who is in his twenty first season as head coach of the Bluejays. His record at Creighton is 678–405 (.597 winning percentage).

The team plays its home games at TD Ameritrade Park Omaha, also the home of the College World Series. Prior to the opening of TD Ameritrade Park, the program played games at the Creighton Sports Complex and Johnny Rosenblatt Stadium in South Omaha, which was also the home of the NCAA College World Series and the Omaha Royals (now known as the Omaha Storm Chasers) of the Pacific Coast League.

1991 College World Series

Creighton appeared in the NCAA College World Series for the only time in 1991. The Jays advanced to the CWS by defeating the Hawaii Rainbows 15–8 in finals of the NCAA West I Regional in Los Angeles. Prior to the victory over Hawaii, the Jays swept the four-game regional by beating Pepperdine, Minnesota and host team USC in a 10-inning 8–7 victory.

The seventh-seeded Bluejays (49–20) opened play against the second seeded Clemson Tigers in front of then record crowd of more than 16,000 at Rosenblatt Stadium. The game ended with an 8–4 Creighton victory, setting up a second round match with MVC rival Wichita State.

The Jays had finished the 1991 regular season with an overall record of 46–18, and a 16–8 record in the Missouri Valley Conference, good enough for second place behind league champion Wichita State. The Shockers had swept the regular season four-game series with the Jays, and had also defeated the Jays twice in the 1991 Missouri Valley Conference Baseball Tournament.

In one of the more memorable games in College World Series history, the Shockers defeated the Jays 3–2 in 12 innings. With one out in the bottom of the twelfth inning Wichita State center fielder Jim Audley threw out Creighton's pinch-runner Steve Burns at home plate in a play known to Bluejay and Shocker fans alike as "the throw." The game was recently ranked third in the list of the 25 greatest games in College World Series history by the Omaha World-Herald.

The Jays bounced back to defeat Long Beach State 13–4 in an elimination game, to set up a rematch with Wichita State in the National Semifinals. A trip to the title game for Creighton was not to be, however, as Wichita State advanced to the National Championship game after defeating Creighton for the eighth time that season, 11–3.

LSU defeated Wichita State 6–3 to win the 1991 NCAA Baseball National Championship.

The Bluejays Head Coach during that memorable 1991 season, Jim Hendry, is a former General Manager of the Chicago Cubs. Jim Hendry is also the only former Creighton Bluejay to have his number retired. His name and number (25) hang on the center field fence of Creighton Sports Complex.

Notable former Bluejay Baseball players include Hall of Fame inductee Bob Gibson as well as Dave McKay, Pat Venditte, Dennis Rasmussen, Scott Stahoviak, Scott Servais, Zach Daeges, Chad McConnell and Alan Benes.

=== Men's basketball ===
Creighton's men's basketball program has been a member of the Big East Conference since the 2013–14 season. Prior to the 2013–14 season, the Jays were members of the Missouri Valley Conference from 1978–2013. Prior to the 1977–78 season, the Jays participated as an Independent from 1948–1977.

Creighton's current head coach is Greg McDermott. He became head coach on April 27, 2010, following stints as the head coach at Wayne State (Nebraska), Northern Iowa, and Iowa State.

The men's team plays all of their home games at CHI Health Center Omaha (capacity 18,320), which opened in 2003 as Qwest Center Omaha and was known from 2011 to 2018 as CenturyLink Center Omaha. The 2018–19 season will be their 16th at CHI Health Center.

Famous individuals associated with Creighton basketball include former players Bob Gibson, Paul Silas, Doug McDermott, Bob Portman, Gene Harmon, Benoit Benjamin, Bob Harstad, Chad Gallagher, Rodney Buford, Kyle Korver, Gary Swain, Ryan Sears, Nate Funk, and Anthony Tolliver. Famous former coaches include "Red" McManus, Eddie Sutton, Willis Reed, Eddie Hickey, Tony Barone, Arthur A. Schabinger, and Dana Altman.

The all-time leading scorer in Creighton men's basketball history is Doug McDermott, who surpassed former leader Rodney Buford during the 2012–13 season. McDermott ended his college career in 2014 with 3,150 total points, placing him fifth on the all-time Division I men's scoring list. He was named the first consensus first-team All-American in Creighton basketball history following the 2011–12 season, his sophomore year, and repeated as a consensus first-team All-American in 2013 and 2014. This made him the first Division I men's player to be a three-time consensus first-team All-American since Patrick Ewing and Wayman Tisdale from 1983 to 1985. McDermott was also named the consensus national player of the year in 2014.

Creighton University was the host institution for the First and Second Rounds site at the venue now known as CHI Health Center Omaha during the 2008 and 2024 NCAA tournaments, the Second and Third Round during the 2012 NCAA tournament, and the Second and Third Round during the 2015 NCAA tournament.

=== Women's basketball ===
The women's basketball team is coached by Jim Flanery, and were the 2004 WNIT Champions. They play their home games on campus at D. J. Sokol Arena.

=== Men's soccer ===
Creighton's current men's soccer coach is Elmar Bolowich. He was named head coach of the Creighton Bluejays on February 9, 2011 following 22 seasons as the head coach at North Carolina.

Creighton plays their home matches on campus at Morrison Stadium, which is named after former university President Fr. Michael Morrison, S.J. The last time Creighton hosted the Missouri Valley Conference men's soccer Tournament was 2011.

The men's soccer team has gone to the NCAA tournament in 18 of the previous 19 seasons with three appearances in the College Cup and one appearance in the National Championship Match.

=== Women's soccer ===
The women's soccer team has won four Missouri Valley Conference Tournament championships, earning the league's automatic bid to the NCAA tournament in each of those years. The team also plays its home games on campus at Morrison Stadium.

=== Softball ===
The softball team has appeared in five Women's College World Series, in 1969 (the first WCWS), 1980, 1981, 1982 (first NCAA WCWS) and 1986.

== Discontinued sports ==
=== Football ===
Football, as well as basketball, were discontinued during World War II for the duration of the war after the conclusion of the basketball season because of travel restrictions and the uncertainty of draft status for 18 and 19-year-old students; basketball returned after the war, but the university never subsequently fielded a football team.
