= 2020–21 Creighton Bluejays men's basketball team =

American college basketball season

2020–21 Creighton Bluejays men's basketball

NCAA tournament, Sweet Sixteen
- Conference: Big East Conference

Ranking
- Coaches: No. 14
- AP: No. 19
- Record: 22–9 (14–6 Big East)
- Head coach: Greg McDermott (11th season)
- Assistant coaches: Terrence Rencher (1st season); Alan Huss (3rd season); Paul Lusk (2nd season)
- Home arena: CHI Health Center Omaha

2020–21 Big East men's basketball standings
	Conf.				Overall
Team	W		L	PCT	W		L	PCT
No. 18 Villanova	11	–	4	.733	18	–	7	.720
No. 19 Creighton	14	–	6	.700	22	–	9	.710
UConn	11	–	6	.647	15	–	8	.652
St. John's	10	–	9	.526	16	–	11	.593
Seton Hall	10	–	9	.526	14	–	13	.519
Providence	9	–	10	.474	13	–	13	.500
Xavier	6	–	7	.462	13	–	8	.619
Georgetown †	7	–	9	.438	13	–	13	.500
Marquette	8	–	11	.421	13	–	14	.481
Butler	8	–	12	.400	10	–	15	.400
DePaul	2	–	13	.133	5	–	14	.263
† 2021 Big East tournament winner Rankings from AP poll

The 2020–21 Creighton Bluejays men's basketball team represented Creighton University in the 2020-21 NCAA Division I men's basketball season. The Bluejays were led by 11th-year head coach Greg McDermott and played their home games at the CHI Health Center Omaha in Omaha, Nebraska, as members of the Big East Conference. They finished the season 22–9, 14–6 to finish second in Big East play. They defeated Butler and UConn in the Big East tournament before losing to Georgetown in the championship game. They received an at-large bid to the NCAA tournament as the No. 5 seed in the West region. They defeated UC Santa Barbara and Ohio to advance to the Sweet Sixteen. This marked the first time Creighton had won consecutive games in the same tournament and the first time they had advanced to the Sweet Sixteen since 1974 when the tournament had 25 teams. There they lost to eventual National Runner-Up Gonzaga.

On March 4, 2021, head coach McDermott was suspended for using racially insensitive language to his team. On March 8, the school reinstated McDermott after only missing one game and allowing him to coach in the Big East and NCAA Tournaments.

== Previous season ==
The Bluejays finished the 2019–20 season 24–7, 13–5 in Big East play to finish tied for first place. As the No. 1 seed in the Big East tournament, they were slated to play St. John's in the quarterfinals, but the tournament was cancelled at halftime of the game due to the COVID-19 pandemic, along with the rest of the NCAA postseason.

== Offseason ==
=== Departures ===
Name	Number	Pos.	Height	Weight	Year	Hometown	Notes
Davion Mintz	1	G	6'3"	185	Senior	Charlotte, NC	Graduate transferred to Kentucky
Ty-Shon Alexander	5	G	6'4"	195	Junior	Charlotte, NC	Declared for the 2020 NBA draft
Jordan Scurry	12	G	6'2"	200	Senior	Chestnut Hill, MA	Graduated
Jalen Windham	21	G	6'5"	180	Freshman	Indianapolis, IN	Transferred to Ball State
Kelvin Jones	43	C	6'11"	230	Senior	Chihuahua, Mexico	Graduated

=== 2020 recruiting class ===
College recruiting
Name	Hometown	School	Height	Weight	Commit date
Rati Andronikashvili; SG	Tbilisi, Georgia	35 Sajaro Skoka	6 ft 4 in (1.93 m)	185 lb (84 kg)	May 7, 2020
Rati Andronikashvili; SG	Recruit ratings: Scout: Rivals: 247Sports: ESPN:				
Ryan Kalkbrenner; C	Saint Louis, MO	Trinity Catholic High School	6 ft 11 in (2.11 m)	210 lb (95 kg)	Sep 23, 2019
Ryan Kalkbrenner; C	Recruit ratings: Scout: Rivals: 247Sports: ESPN:				
Modestas Kancleris; PF	Kaunas, Lithuania	Varpas Gimnazija	6 ft 9 in (2.06 m)	195 lb (88 kg)	May 11, 2020
Modestas Kancleris; PF	Recruit ratings: Scout: Rivals: 247Sports: ESPN:				
Overall recruit ranking:
Note: In many cases, Scout, Rivals, 247Sports, On3, and ESPN may conflict in their listings of height and weight.; In these cases, the average was taken. ESPN grades are on a 100-point scale.; Sources: "2020 Team Ranking". Rivals.

=== 2021 Recruiting class ===
College recruiting (2021)
Name	Hometown	School	Height	Weight	Commit date
Arthur Kaluma; PF	Boston, MA	Dream City Christian	6 ft 8 in (2.03 m)	205 lb (93 kg)	May 16, 2021
Arthur Kaluma; PF	Recruit ratings: Rivals: 247Sports: ESPN:				
Ryan Nembhard; PG	Aurora, ON	Montverde Academy	6 ft 1 in (1.85 m)	165 lb (75 kg)	Jun 6, 2020
Ryan Nembhard; PG	Recruit ratings: Rivals: 247Sports: ESPN:				
Mason Miller; PF	Germantown, TN	Houston	6 ft 9 in (2.06 m)	180 lb (82 kg)	Nov 23, 2020
Mason Miller; PF	Recruit ratings: Rivals: 247Sports: ESPN:				
John Christofilis; SG	Seattle, WA	O'Dea	6 ft 4 in (1.93 m)	170 lb (77 kg)	Sep 25, 2020
John Christofilis; SG	Recruit ratings: Rivals: 247Sports: ESPN:				
Trey Alexander; SG	Oklahoma City, OK	Heritage Hall	6 ft 4 in (1.93 m)	185 lb (84 kg)	Jun 2, 2021
Trey Alexander; SG	Recruit ratings: Rivals: 247Sports: ESPN:				
Overall recruit ranking: Rivals: 12
Note: In many cases, Scout, Rivals, 247Sports, On3, and ESPN may conflict in their listings of height and weight.; In these cases, the average was taken. ESPN grades are on a 100-point scale.; Sources: "2021 Team Ranking". Rivals.

=== Incoming transfers ===
Name	Number	Pos.	Height	Weight	Year	Hometown	Previous School
Alex O'Connell	5	G	6'6"	186	Junior	Roswell, GA	Transferred from Duke. Under NCAA transfer rules, O'Connell will play this season and will gain an additional extra eligibility.

== Roster ==
2020–21 Creighton Bluejays men's basketball team
Players
Coaches

Pos.	#	Name	Height	Weight	Year	Previous school	Hometown
G	0	Antwann Jones	6 ft 6 in (1.98 m)	220 lb (100 kg)	RS So	Oak Ridge; Memphis	Orlando, FL
G	4	Shereef Mitchell	6 ft 0 in (1.83 m)	170 lb (77 kg)	So	Sunrise Christian Academy	Omaha, NE
G	5	Alex O'Connell	6 ft 6 in (1.98 m)	186 lb (84 kg)	Sr	Milton HS; Duke	Roswell, GA
G	10	Jett Canfield	5 ft 10 in (1.78 m)	165 lb (75 kg)	RS So	Hayden HS	Topeka, KS
G	11	Marcus Zegarowski	6 ft 2 in (1.88 m)	180 lb (82 kg)	Jr	Tilton School	Hamilton, MA
G	12	Andrew Merfeld (W)	5 ft 11 in (1.8 m)	185 lb (84 kg)	Fr	V. J. and Angela Skutt Catholic HS	Omaha, NE
F	13	Christian Bishop	6 ft 7 in (2.01 m)	220 lb (100 kg)	Jr	West	Lee's Summit, MO
G	14	Sami Osmani (W)	6 ft 4 in (1.93 m)	205 lb (93 kg)	Fr	Oak Lawn Community HS	Oak Lawn, IL
F	20	Nic Zeil	6 ft 8 in (2.03 m)	210 lb (95 kg)	So	Park Hill HS	Kansas City, MO
G	22	Devin Davis (W)	6 ft 0 in (1.83 m)	175 lb (79 kg)	Fr	George Westinghouse College Prep	Chicago, IL
F	23	Damien Jefferson	6 ft 5 in (1.96 m)	220 lb (100 kg)	RS Sr	Central HS; New Mexico	East Chicago, IN
G	24	Mitch Ballock	6 ft 5 in (1.96 m)	205 lb (93 kg)	Sr	Eudora HS	Eudora, KS
C	32	Ryan Kalkbrenner	7 ft 0 in (2.13 m)	235 lb (107 kg)	Fr	Trinity Catholic HS	St. Louis, MO
G/F	34	Denzel Mahoney	6 ft 5 in (1.96 m)	220 lb (100 kg)	Sr	Hagerty; Southeast Missouri State	Oviedo, FL
C	41	Jacob Epperson	6 ft 11 in (2.11 m)	235 lb (107 kg)	Jr	La Lumiere (IN)	Melbourne, Australia
G	44	Rati Andronikashvili (redshirt)	6 ft 4 in (1.93 m)	185 lb (84 kg)	Fr	35 Sajaro Skoka	Tbilisi, Georgia
F	55	Modestas Kancleris (redshirt)	6 ft 9 in (2.06 m)	195 lb (88 kg)	Fr	Varpas Gimnazija	Kaunas, Lithuania

Head coach

- Greg McDermott (Northern Iowa)

Assistant coach(es)

- Alan Huss (Creighton)
- Paul Lusk (Southern Illinois)
- Terrence Rencher (Texas)

Legend

- (C) Team captain
- (S) Suspended
- (I) Ineligible
- (W) Walk-on
- Injured
- Current redshirt

Roster

== Schedule and results ==
Date time, TV	Rank^{#}	Opponent^{#}	Result	Record	High points	High rebounds	High assists	Site (attendance) city, state
Regular season
November 29, 2020*; 3:30 p.m., FS1	No. 11	North Dakota State	W 69–58	1–0	16 – Bishop	7 – Ballock	6 – Zegarowski	CHI Health Center Omaha (252); Omaha, NE
December 1, 2020*; 4:00 p.m., FS1	No. 9	Omaha	W 94–67	2–0	18 – Bishop	8 – Bishop	11 – Zegarowski	CHI Health Center Omaha (251); Omaha, NE
December 4, 2020*; 4:00 p.m., FS1	No. 9	Kennesaw State	W 93–58	3–0	14 – Tied	7 – Jones	4 – Zegarowski	CHI Health Center Omaha (201); Omaha, NE
December 8, 2020*; 4:00 p.m., ESPN	No. 8	at No. 5 Kansas; Big East/Big 12 Battle	L 72–73	3–1	19 – Mahoney	9 – Bishop	5 – Ballock	Allen Fieldhouse (2,500); Lawrence, KS
December 11, 2020*; 6:00 p.m., BTN	No. 8	Nebraska; Rivalry	W 98–74	4–1	22 – Zegarowski	8 – Kalkbrenner	5 – Tied	CHI Health Center Omaha (254); Omaha, NE
December 14, 2020; 8:00 p.m., FS1	No. 9	Marquette	L 84–89	4–2 (0–1)	26 – Ballock	6 – Tied	5 – Zegarowski	CHI Health Center Omaha (255); Omaha, NE
December 17, 2020; 4:00 p.m., FS1	No. 9	at St. John's	W 94–76	5–2 (1–1)	20 – Zegarowski	10 – Tied	8 – Jefferson	Carnesecca Arena; Queens, NY
December 20, 2020; 11:00 a.m., FS1	No. 9	at UConn	W 76–74 ^{OT}	6–2 (2–1)	19 – Bishop	13 – Mahoney	4 – Jefferson	Harry A. Gampel Pavilion; Storrs, CT
December 23, 2020; 7:00 p.m., FS1	No. 13	No. 22 Xavier	W 66–61	7–2 (3–1)	13 – Tied	7 – Bishop	2 – 4 Tied	CHI Health Center Omaha (1,673); Omaha, NE
January 2, 2021; 11:00 a.m., FOX	No. 11	at Providence	W 67–65	8–2 (4–1)	20 – Zegarowski	8 – Jefferson	4 – Zegarowski	Alumni Hall; Providence, RI
January 6, 2021; 9:00 p.m., FS1	No. 7	Seton Hall	W 89–53	9–2 (5–1)	19 – Jefferson	7 – Kalkbrenner	4 – Zegarowski	CHI Health Center Omaha (1,689); Omaha, NE
January 9, 2021; 12:00 p.m., FS1	No. 7	St. John's	W 97–79	10–2 (6–1)	24 – Mahoney	6 – Tied	5 – Jefferson	CHI Health Center Omaha (1,777); Omaha, NE
January 16, 2021; 1:00 p.m., FOX	No. 8	at Butler	L 66–70 ^{OT}	10–3 (6–2)	29 – Mahoney	7 – Tied	4 – Mitchell	Hinkle Fieldhouse (1,693); Indianapolis, IN
January 20, 2021; 8:00 p.m., FS1	No. 11	Providence	L 70–74	10–4 (6–3)	26 – Jefferson	5 – Kalkbrenner	3 – Tied	CHI Health Center Omaha (1,731); Omaha, NE
January 23, 2021; 1:30 p.m., FOX	No. 11	No. 23 UConn	W 74–66	11–4 (7–3)	20 – Mahoney	5 – Jefferson	3 – Ballock	CHI Health Center Omaha (1,839); Omaha, NE
January 27, 2021; 6:00 p.m., FS1	No. 17	at Seton Hall	W 85–81	12–4 (8–3)	29 – Ballock	7 – Mahoney	4 – Ballock	Prudential Center; Newark, NJ
January 30, 2021; 7:00 p.m., CBSSN	No. 17	at DePaul	W 69–62	13–4 (9–3)	19 – Zegarowski	6 – Tied	5 – Zegarowski	Wintrust Arena; Chicago, IL
February 3, 2021; 9:00 p.m., FS1	No. 15	Georgetown	L 79–86	13–5 (9–4)	22 – Mahoney	10 – Bishop	6 – Zegarowski	CHI Health Center Omaha (1,845); Omaha, NE
February 6, 2021; 5:00 p.m., FS1	No. 15	at Marquette	W 71–68	14–5 (10–4)	14 – Bishop	8 – Tied	6 – Jefferson	Fiserv Forum; Milwaukee, WI
February 9, 2021; 9:00 p.m., CBSSN	No. 19	at Georgetown	W 63–48	15–5 (11–4)	17 – Bishop	9 – Bishop	4 – Tied	McDonough Gymnasium; Washington, DC
February 13, 2021; 5:00 p.m., FOX	No. 19	No. 5 Villanova	W 86–70	16–5 (12–4)	25 – Zegarowski	10 – Tied	5 – Zegarowski	CHI Health Center Omaha (2,544); Omaha, NE
February 24, 2021; 8:00 p.m., CBSSN	No. 13	DePaul	W 77–53	17–5 (13–4)	13 – 3 Tied	7 – Kalkbrenner	4 – Zegarowski	CHI Health Center Omaha (1,936); Omaha, NE
February 27, 2021; 4:00 p.m., FOX	No. 13	at Xavier	L 69–77	17–6 (13–5)	19 – Jefferson	9 – Jefferson	10 – Zegarowski	Cintas Center; Cincinnati, OH
March 3, 2021; 7:30 p.m., FS1	No. 14	at No. 10 Villanova	L 60–72	17–7 (13–6)	14 – Ballock	8 – Jefferson	4 – Tied	Finneran Pavilion; Villanova, PA
March 6, 2021; 4:00 p.m., FOX	No. 14	Butler	W 93–73	18–7 (14–6)	32 – Zegarowski	10 – Bishop	6 – Ballock	CHI Health Center Omaha (2,419); Omaha, NE
Big East tournament
March 11, 2021; 5:00 p.m., FS1	(2) No. 17	vs. (10) Butler; Quarterfinals	W 87–56	19–7	18 – Zegarowski	4 – 3 Tied	5 – Zegarowski	Madison Square Garden; Manhattan, NY
March 12, 2021; 9:00 p.m., FS1	(2) No. 17	vs. (3) UConn; Semifinals	W 59–56	20–7	14 – Jefferson	12 – Jefferson	3 – Tied	Madison Square Garden (824); Manhattan, NY
March 13, 2021; 6:30 p.m., FOX	(2) No. 17	vs. (8) Georgetown; Championship	L 48–73	20–8	17 – Zegarowski	5 – Ballock	4 – Zegarowski	Madison Square Garden (824); Manhattan, NY
NCAA tournament
March 20, 2021; 2:30 p.m., truTV	(5 W) No. 19	vs. (12 W) UC Santa Barbara; First Round	W 63–62	21–8	17 – Zegarowski	11 – Bishop	7 – Zegarowski	Lucas Oil Stadium (6,512); Indianapolis, IN
March 22, 2021; 5:10 p.m., TNT	(5 W) No. 19	vs. (13 W) Ohio; Second Round	W 72–58	22–8	20 – Zegarowski	15 – Bishop	5 – Ballock	Hinkle Fieldhouse (1,058); Indianapolis, IN
March 28, 2021; 1:10 p.m., CBS	(5 W) No. 19	vs. (1 W) No. 1 Gonzaga; Sweet Sixteen	L 65–83	22–9	19 – Zegarowski	5 – Tied	3 – Tied	Hinkle Fieldhouse (1,060); Indianapolis, IN
*Non-conference game. ^{#}Rankings from AP Poll. (#) Tournament seedings in parentheses. W=West. All times are in Central Time.

== Rankings ==
Ranking movements Legend: ██ Increase in ranking ██ Decrease in ranking
	Week																	
Poll	Pre	1	2	3	4	5	6	7	8	9	10	11	12	13	14	15	16	Final
AP	11	9	8	9	13	11	7	8	11	17	15	19	14	13	14	17	19	Not released
Coaches	11	11^	7	9	13	10	5	6	11	14	12	18	12	11	12	17	19	14

^Coaches did not release a Week 1 poll.
