= Ed Beisser =

American basketball player (1919–2000)

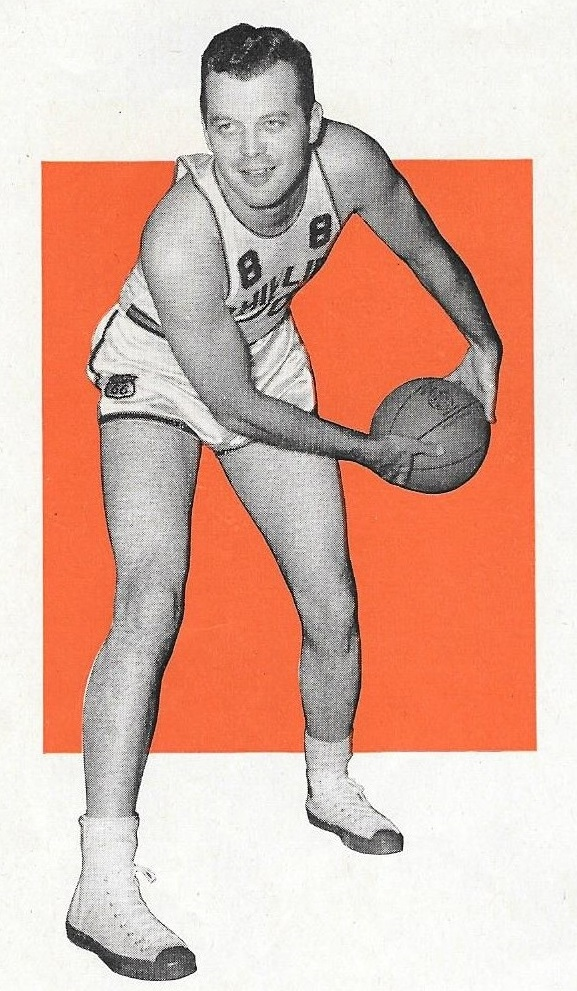
- Beisser with the Phillips 66ers

Personal information
- Born: May 9, 1919 Des Moines, Iowa, U.S.
- Died: October 7, 2000 (aged 81) Bartlesville, Oklahoma, U.S.
- Listed height: 6 ft 5 in (1.96 m)

Career information
- High school: North (Des Moines, Iowa)
- College: Creighton (1940–1943)
- Position: Center
- Number: 48

Career highlights
- AAU All-American (1944); Consensus first-team All-American (1943); 3× First-team All-MVC (1941–1943)

Edward J. Beisser (May 9, 1919 – October 7, 2000) was an American standout basketball player for Creighton University in the early 1940s and was named a consensus NCAA First Team All-American as a senior in 1942–43. He was a three-time First Team All-Missouri Valley Conference selection and was later named one of the MVC's "50 Greatest Players" in the conference's history.

Beisser attended North High School in Des Moines, Iowa. He had been a first team all-state center and enrolled at Creighton in the fall of 1939. Since college freshmen were not allowed to play varsity sports back then, he had to wait until his sophomore year in 1940–41. In his three varsity seasons, Beisser was First Team All-MVC, won two outright conference championships (1941, 1943) and shared a co-MVC title with Oklahoma A&M in 1942, and capped his career with an All-American selection. In 1941, Creighton participated in the third-ever NCAA Tournament, but lost in the first round. In 1942 and 1943, Beisser led the Bluejays to National Invitation Tournament (NIT) appearances. They won the Third Place Game in 1942 over Toledo, 48–46, but lost in the first round the following year to Washington & Jefferson, 43–42. Beisser was named to the All-Tournament Team in 1942.

After college, Beisser joined the Phillips Oilers in the Amateur Athletic Union (AAU) and teamed with Bob Kurland, a two-time NCAA champion and future Basketball Hall of Famer, to lead the Oilers to three straight national championships in 1946, 1947 and 1948. Phillips then defeated the University of Kentucky in a 1948 Olympic Games playoff match. As a result, Beisser was selected as an alternate for the United States men's national basketball team. He never played for them, however, and he stayed with the Phillips Petroleum Company throughout his later life while living in Bartlesville, Oklahoma.
