= Anthony Tolliver =

American basketball player (born 1985)

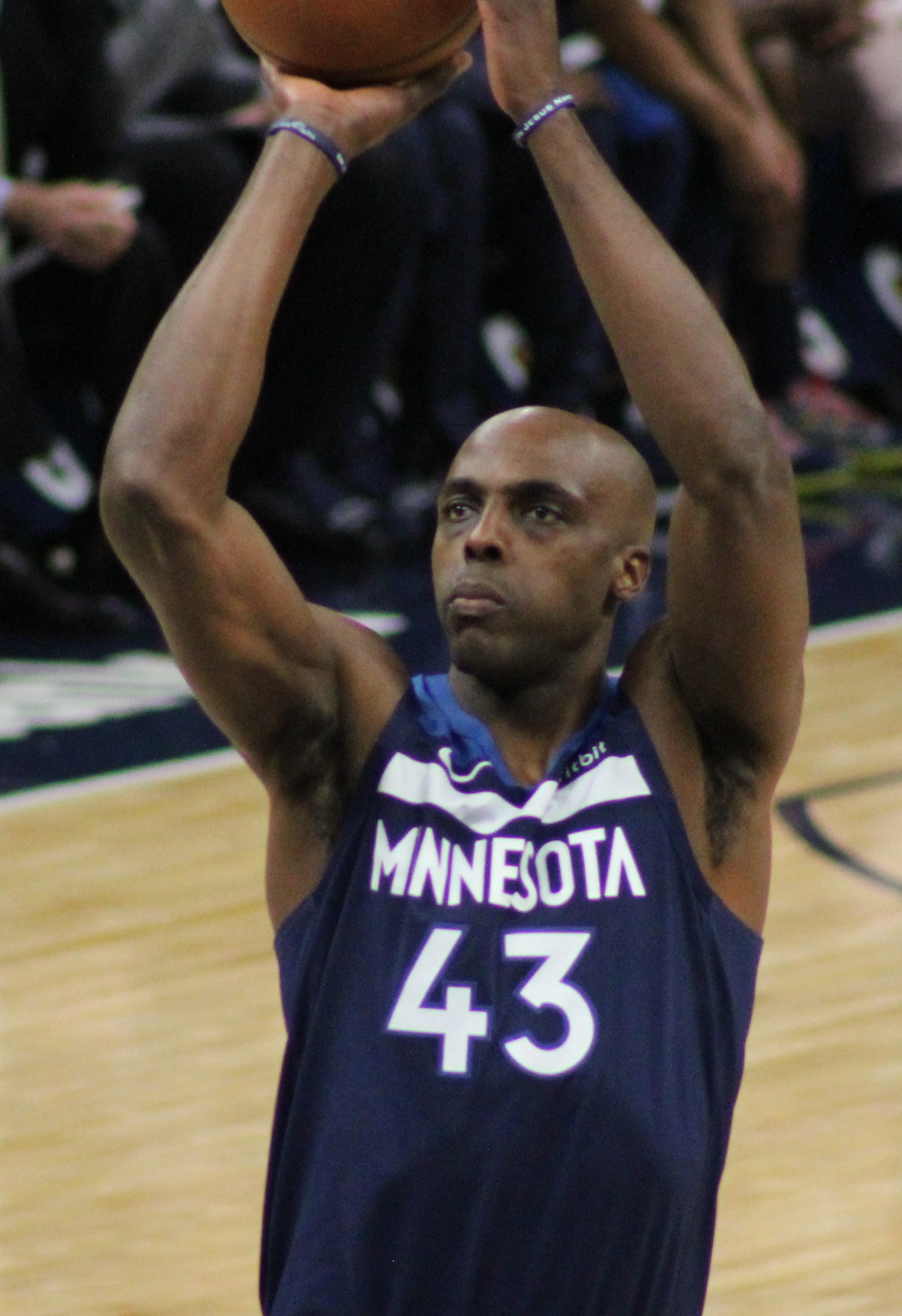
- Tolliver with the Minnesota Timberwolves in 2019

Personal information
- Born: June 1, 1985 (age 41) Springfield, Missouri, U.S.
- Listed height: 6 ft 8 in (2.03 m)
- Listed weight: 240 lb (109 kg)

Career information
- High school: Kickapoo (Springfield, Missouri)
- College: Creighton (2003–2007)
- NBA draft: 2007: undrafted
- Playing career: 2007–2021
- Position: Power forward
- Number: 35, 44, 4, 43, 40

Career history
- 2007–2008: Iowa Energy
- 2008: Eisbären Bremerhaven
- 2008–2009: San Antonio Spurs
- 2008: →Austin Toros
- 2009: Iowa Energy
- 2009: Galatasaray Cafe Crown
- 2009: Idaho Stampede
- 2009: Portland Trail Blazers
- 2010: Idaho Stampede
- 2010: Golden State Warriors
- 2010–2012: Minnesota Timberwolves
- 2012–2013: Atlanta Hawks
- 2013–2014: Charlotte Bobcats
- 2014: Phoenix Suns
- 2014–2016: Detroit Pistons
- 2016–2017: Sacramento Kings
- 2017–2018: Detroit Pistons
- 2018–2019: Minnesota Timberwolves
- 2019–2020: Portland Trail Blazers
- 2020: Sacramento Kings
- 2020: Memphis Grizzlies
- 2021: Philadelphia 76ers

Career highlights
- NBA D-League All-Star (2010); First-team All-MVC (2007); Second-team All-MVC (2006)
- Stats at NBA.com
- Stats at Basketball Reference

Anthony Lamar Tolliver (born June 1, 1985) is an American former professional basketball player. He played college basketball for the Creighton Bluejays. Tolliver spent 13 seasons in the National Basketball Association (NBA) with the San Antonio Spurs, Portland Trail Blazers, Golden State Warriors, Minnesota Timberwolves, Atlanta Hawks, Charlotte Bobcats, Phoenix Suns, Detroit Pistons, Sacramento Kings, Memphis Grizzlies, and Philadelphia 76ers. He also played in the NBA Development League and overseas in Germany and Turkey.

== High school and college career ==
Tolliver committed to Creighton in the fall of 2002. He was one of four players from his Kickapoo High School team to play Division I basketball; the team ended his senior season of 2002–03 ranked 12th by the USA Today and as the Missouri Class 5A State Champions.

At Creighton, Tolliver played in a reserve role during his freshman season behind veterans Brody Deren, Mike Grimes, and Joe Dabbert, but saw action in 27 games. He started 30 of Creighton's 34 games his sophomore season, including an 8-point, 7-rebound performance in a 75–57 victory over Missouri State in the 2005 MVC tournament championship game.

Tolliver earned second-team all-MVC honors during his junior season and had a memorable last-second shot to win a game against Wichita State on January 28, 2006.

Tolliver was named first-team all MVC, a finalist for the Lowe's Senior CLASS award, and to the Collegeinsider.com mid-major All-America team during his senior year, and helped Creighton return to the NCAA Tournament and a 22–11 record. Tolliver started all 33 of the team's games and broke the 1,000 point mark for his career in his final collegiate game against Nevada in the first round of the NCAA Tournament. While playing for Creighton, he developed a unique ability to draw charging penalties while on defense.

== Professional career ==
=== Iowa Energy (2007–2008) ===
After going undrafted out of Creighton in 2007, Tolliver spent the preseason with the Cleveland Cavaliers, making the opening-day roster, but never playing. He spent much of the 2007–08 season with the Iowa Energy of the NBA Development League, averaging 11.5 points and 6.4 rebounds per game,

=== Bremerhaven (2008) ===
Tolliver later joined collegiate teammate Nate Funk with Eisbären Bremerhaven of the German Basketball Bundesliga.

=== San Antonio Spurs (2008–2009) ===
Following a stint in Germany which saw him average 14.3 points and 7.3 rebounds per game, Tolliver was signed by the San Antonio Spurs in July 2008.

Tolliver spent the early part of the 2008–09 campaign shuttling between San Antonio and Austin of the D-League. After appearing in 11 early games with San Antonio (averaging 3.5 points and 2.3 rebounds in 12.1 minutes per game), he was sent to Austin for six games, where he averaged 17.8 points and 7.8 rebounds in his second D-League stint. He appeared in eight more games with San Antonio before being waived January 7, 2009.

=== Return to Iowa (2009) ===
Tolliver signed with the Iowa Energy again shortly after. Tolliver then signed with New Orleans after three games with Iowa. After his ten-day contract expired without renewal, he returned to Iowa for a third stint.

=== Galatasaray (2009) ===
Tolliver was averaging 12.6 points and 8.1 rebounds per game with the Energy when he signed with Galatasaray Café Crown of the Turkish Basketball League.

=== Idaho Stampede (2009) ===
In December 2009, Tolliver was playing for the Idaho Stampede of the NBA Development League.

=== Portland Trail Blazers (2009) ===
In December 2009, the Portland Trail Blazers signed Tolliver to a short-term contract. The Blazers were able to temporarily sign a 16th player, one more than the usual league maximum, after the NBA granted the team a hardship exemption following a series of injuries to several key players.

=== Return to Idaho (2010) ===
Tolliver played two games for Portland before being released on December 29, 2009, returning to Idaho.

=== Golden State Warriors (2010) ===
On January 17, 2010, Tolliver was signed to a 10-day contract by the Golden State Warriors, who were also struggling with injuries. He was signed to a contract through the rest of the 2009–10 season on February 7, 2010.

On April 7, 2010, Tolliver scored a career-high 34 points, shooting 14 for 22 from the field and 5 for 7 from the line. He also made one three-pointer and grabbed 8 rebounds. During the 2009–2010 season with the Warriors, he averaged 12.3 points and 7.3 rebounds per game.

=== Minnesota Timberwolves (2010–2012) ===
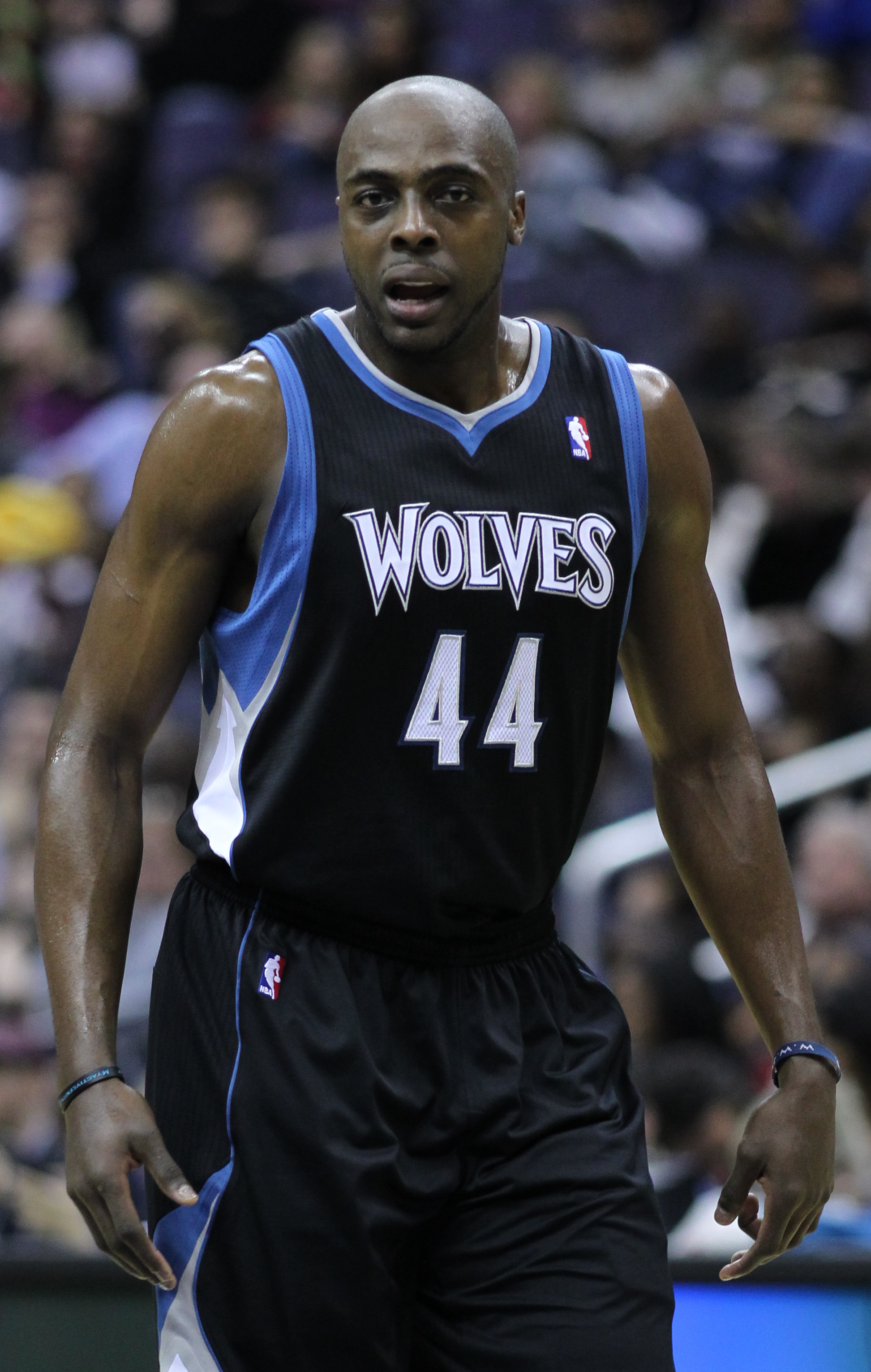
Tolliver in March 2011

In the 2010 off-season, Tolliver joined the Minnesota Timberwolves on a two-year deal worth $4.5 million.

=== Atlanta Hawks (2012–2013) ===
In September 2012, Tolliver signed a one-year, $854,389 contract with the Atlanta Hawks.

=== Charlotte Bobcats (2013–2014) ===
On August 19, 2013, Tolliver signed a one-year, $1 million contract with the Charlotte Bobcats.

=== Phoenix Suns (2014) ===
On July 21, 2014, Tolliver signed a 2-year, $6 million contract with the Phoenix Suns. He went on to play 24 games for Phoenix in 2014–15 while averaging 3.3 points and 1.8 rebounds per game.

=== Detroit Pistons (2014–2016) ===
He was traded to the Detroit Pistons on December 24, 2014, in exchange for Tony Mitchell.

=== Sacramento Kings (2016–2017) ===
On July 9, 2016, Tolliver signed a 2-year, $16 million contract with the Sacramento Kings. On June 1, 2017, he was waived by the Kings.

=== Return to Detroit (2017–2018) ===
On July 14, 2017, Tolliver signed a one-year, $3.3 million contract with the Detroit Pistons. He finished second in 3-point shooting percentage in the league after shooting 46.1%, behind only teammate Reggie Bullock.

=== Return to Minnesota (2018–2019) ===
On July 9, 2018, Tolliver signed a one-year, $5.75 million contract with the Minnesota Timberwolves.

=== Return to Portland (2019–2020) ===
On July 3, 2019, Tolliver signed a one-year, $2.56 million deal with the Portland Trail Blazers.

=== Return to Sacramento (2020) ===
On January 20, 2020, Tolliver was traded back to the Sacramento Kings along with Kent Bazemore and two future second round picks in exchange for Trevor Ariza, Wenyen Gabriel and Caleb Swanigan. On February 29, 2020, Tolliver was waived by the Kings after appearing in 9 games.

=== Memphis Grizzlies (2020) ===
On March 2, 2020, the Memphis Grizzlies announced that they had signed Tolliver to a 10-day contract. On June 22, the Grizzlies announced they would bring back Tolliver for the restart of the 2020 NBA season.

=== Philadelphia 76ers (2021) ===
On April 12, 2021, Tolliver signed a 10-day contract with the Philadelphia 76ers. On April 22, he signed a second 10-day contract and ten days later, he signed for the rest of the season. On August 27, he was waived by the Sixers after playing 11 games and averaging 1.5 points 0.9 rebounds and 0.2 assists

On December 26, 2021, the New Orleans Pelicans signed Tolliver to a 10-day contract via the hardship exception. However, the contract was voided the next day due to a positive COVID-19 test.

== Career statistics ==
Legend
GP	Games played	GS	Games started	MPG	Minutes per game
FG%	Field goal percentage	3P%	3-point field goal percentage	FT%	Free throw percentage
RPG	Rebounds per game	APG	Assists per game	SPG	Steals per game
BPG	Blocks per game	PPG	Points per game	**Bold**	Career high

=== NBA ===
==== Regular season ====
Year	Team	GP	GS	MPG	FG%	3P%	FT%	RPG	APG	SPG	BPG	PPG
2008–09	San Antonio	19	0	25.9	.292	.220	.500	2.2	.9	.3	.1	2.7
2009–10	Portland	2	0	2.0	.000	.000	.000	.5	.0	.0	.0	.0
2009–10	Golden State	44	**29**	**32.3**	.431	.331	.769	**7.3**	**2.0**	**.7**	**.8**	**12.3**
2010–11	Minnesota	65	4	21.0	.450	.409	.802	4.5	1.3	.4	.4	6.7
2011–12	Minnesota	51	0	17.3	.390	.248	.745	3.0	.4	.4	.4	4.1
2012–13	Atlanta	62	11	15.5	.380	.338	.863	2.5	.5	.2	.2	4.1
2013–14	Charlotte	64	9	20.3	.420	.413	.805	2.6	.7	.3	.2	6.1
2014–15	Phoenix	24	0	11.3	.351	.387	.667	1.8	.4	.2	.0	3.3
2014–15	Detroit	52	11	22.3	.423	.360	.794	3.7	.9	.4	.3	7.7
2015–16	Detroit	72	5	18.6	.386	.360	.617	3.2	.7	.4	.2	5.3
2016–17	Sacramento	65	9	22.7	.442	.391	.744	3.7	1.2	.5	.3	7.1
2017–18	Detroit	**79**	14	22.2	**.464**	**.436**	.797	3.1	1.1	.4	.3	8.9
2018–19	Minnesota	65	0	16.6	.382	.377	.783	2.7	.7	.3	.3	5.0
2019–20	Portland	33	9	16.8	.368	.337	.684	3.3	.3	.2	.3	3.9
2019–20	Sacramento	9	0	9.1	.176	.133	.500	1.2	.3	.4	.1	1.0
2019–20	Memphis	13	4	18.2	.396	.415	**.875**	2.5	.8	.5	.1	4.8
2020–21	Philadelphia	11	0	9.0	.235	.286	.833	0.9	.2	.3	.2	1.5
Career		730	105	19.4	.414	.373	.771	3.3	.9	.4	.3	6.1

==== Playoffs ====
Year	Team	GP	GS	MPG	FG%	3P%	FT%	RPG	APG	SPG	BPG	PPG
2013	Atlanta	**6**	0	**11.3**	**.571**	**.636**	.333	**1.5**	.2	**.2**	.2	**4.0**
2014	Charlotte	4	0	5.3	.500	.500	**1.000**	1.0	**.3**	.0	.0	1.5
2016	Detroit	3	0	8.7	.500	.000	.000	1.3	**.3**	.0	**.3**	1.3
2021	Philadelphia	1	0	2.0	.000	.000	.000	.0	.0	.0	.0	0.0
Career		14	0	8.4	.550	.533	.667	1.2	.2	.1	.1	2.4

=== NBA D-League ===
==== Regular season ====
Year	Team	GP	GS	MPG	FG%	3P%	FT%	RPG	APG	SPG	BPG	PPG
2007–08	Iowa	**25**	11	27.4	**.509**	.360	.672	6.4	.9	.9	1.1	11.6
2008–09	Austin	6	6	**38.3**	.500	**.488**	.778	7.8	**2.8**	1.2	.3	17.8
2008–09	Iowa	11	8	35.2	.462	.327	**.806**	8.1	1.5	**1.4**	**1.5**	12.6
2009–10	Idaho	14	**14**	37.5	.469	.349	.785	**11.4**	2.5	1.3	1.2	**21.4**
Career		56	39	32.6	.486	.371	.746	8.1	1.6	1.1	1.1	14.9

== Personal life ==
Tolliver is married and has four children. His mother, Donna Lewis, worked as a teacher before her death in 2008. Tolliver established an endowed scholarship at Drury University in her memory.

In 2020, Tolliver participated in a group of NBA players that visited the Vatican to discuss social and economic inequality with Pope Francis.

Tolliver is a member of the "Starting Five", along with Malcolm Brogdon, Joe Harris, Justin Anderson, and Garrett Temple. Their goal was to raise $225,000 through Hoops2O, founded by Brogdon, to fund five wells in East Africa by the end of the 2018–19 season. By February 2020, the charity had funded the construction of ten wells in Tanzania and Kenya, bringing water to over 52,000 citizens.
