= Bob Portman =

American basketball player

Personal information
- Born: March 22, 1947 (age 79) San Francisco, California, U.S.
- Listed height: 6 ft 5 in (1.96 m)
- Listed weight: 200 lb (91 kg)

Career information
- High school: St. Ignatius (San Francisco, California)
- College: Creighton (1966–1969)
- NBA draft: 1969: 1st round, 7th overall pick
- Drafted by: San Francisco Warriors
- Playing career: 1969–1973
- Position: Small forward
- Number: 33

Career history
- 1969–1973: San Francisco / Golden State Warriors

Career highlights
- No. 33 retired by Creighton Bluejays; California Mr. Basketball (1965)

Career NBA statistics
- Points: 1,254 (5.7 ppg)
- Rebounds: 729 (3.3 rpg)
- Assists: 128 (0.6 apg)
- Stats at NBA.com
- Stats at Basketball Reference

Robert Michael Portman (born March 22, 1947) is an American former professional basketball player. At 6'6" and 200 lb, he played the small forward position.

Portman played basketball at St. Ignatius College Preparatory in San Francisco, California where he graduated from in 1965. He was inducted into the San Francisco Prep Hall of Fame for basketball in 1988.

Portman attended Creighton University in Omaha, Nebraska, and played for three seasons (1966–1969). He left Creighton as the school's all-time leading scorer, a mark that stood for 22 seasons. Portman still holds the Creighton record for points scored in a game, 51 points against the University of Wisconsin–Milwaukee on December 16, 1967. Portman also holds the record for most points in a single season, 738 points during the 1967–1968 season, for an average of 29.5 points per game, also still a Creighton Bluejays school record. His brother Tom played basketball at Loyola Marymount University and his brother Bill played basketball at Gonzaga University.

Portman played college basketball in an era where the NCAA did not allow college freshman to play on the varsity team. Thus, Portman played only three full seasons for the Creighton Bluejays, finishing 1,876 total points. Had Portman been able to play on the varsity squad, he most certainly would still be the school's all-time leading scorer. This feat is remarkable in another sense because Portman also played in the era of basketball where the three-point line was non-existent.

Portman was selected by the Denver Rockets in the 1969 American Basketball Association Draft, and with the 7th overall pick in the 1969 NBA draft by the San Francisco Warriors. He never played in the ABA but played four seasons with the Warriors and retired from the league in 1973.

== Career statistics ==
Legend
GP	Games played	GS	Games started	MPG	Minutes per game
FG%	Field goal percentage	3P%	3-point field goal percentage	FT%	Free throw percentage
RPG	Rebounds per game	APG	Assists per game	SPG	Steals per game
BPG	Blocks per game	PPG	Points per game	**Bold**	Career high

=== NBA ===
==== Regular season ====
Year	Team	GP	MPG	FG%	FT%	RPG	APG	PPG
1969–70	San Francisco	60	13.6	.445	.776	3.7	.5	7.0
1970–71	San Francisco	**68**	**20.5**	**.458**	.726	**4.7**	**1.0**	**7.6**
1971–72	Golden State	61	9.1	.403	**.883**	2.2	.4	3.8
1972–73	Golden State	32	5.5	.457	.769	1.6	.2	2.6
Career		221	13.3	.443	.780	3.3	.6	5.7

==== Playoffs ====
Year	Team	GP	MPG	FG%	FT%	RPG	APG	PPG
1971	San Francisco	**5**	**22.0**	**.513**	.667	**4.0**	**.4**	**9.2**
1972	Golden State	3	7.3	.167	**1.000**	1.7	.0	1.7
1973	Golden State	3	5.7	.200	**1.000**	1.7	.3	2.7
Career		11	13.5	.393	.786	2.7	.3	5.4
