= Booker Woodfox =

American basketball player (born 1986)

Personal information
- Born: September 6, 1986 (age 40) Dallas, Texas
- Listed height: 6 ft 1 in (1.85 m)
- Listed weight: 185 lb (84 kg)

Career information
- High school: Lewisville (Lewisville, Texas)
- College: San Jacinto (2005–2007); Creighton (2007–2009)
- NBA draft: 2009: undrafted
- Playing career: 2010–2017
- Position: Shooting guard
- Number: 11

Career history
- 2010: Sagesse
- 2010–2012: Texas Legends
- 2012: Trotamundos de Carabobo
- 2012: Pieno žvaigždės
- 2013–2014: Texas Legends
- 2014: Trotamundos de Carabobo
- 2014: Guerreros de Bogotá
- 2014–2015: Texas Legends
- 2016–2017: Cape Breton Highlanders

Career highlights
- 2× D-League Three-Point Shootout champion (2011, 2012); MVC Player of the Year (2009); AP honorable mention All-American (2009); First-team All-MVC (2009); MVC Sixth Man of the Year (2008); MVC All-Newcomer Team (2008)
- Stats at Basketball Reference

Booker Woodfox (born September 6, 1986) is an American former professional basketball player. He was an All-American player at Creighton University.

== College career ==
Woodfox, a 6'1" guard from Lewisville High School in Lewisville, Texas, played two seasons for San Jacinto Junior College. He then moved to Creighton. As a junior, he averaged 9.6 points, 2.2 rebounds, and 1.3 assists per game off the bench to earn Missouri Valley Conference sixth man of the year honors. As a senior in 2008–09, Woodfox raised his scoring to 15.8 points per game and led the MVC in three-point field goal shooting percentage. At the conclusion of the season, he was named MVC Player of the Year; he was also named an honorable mention All-American by the Associated Press.

== Professional career ==
Woodfox went undrafted in the 2009 NBA draft. On November 5, 2009, he was selected by the Fort Wayne Mad Ants in the fourth round of the 2009 NBA D-League draft. However, he was later waived by the Mad Ants on November 18, 2009. On January 4, 2010, he was acquired by the Erie BayHawks, but was waived by the team a week later before appearing in a game for them. In February 2010, he signed with Sagesse of Lebanon for the rest of the 2009–10 season.

On November 1, 2010, Woodfox was selected by the Texas Legends in the sixth round of the 2010 NBA D-League draft.

In November 2011, Woodfox was reacquired by the Texas Legends. In April 2012, he joined Trotamundos de Carabobo for the 2012 LPB season.

In July 2012, Woodfox joined the Dallas Mavericks for the 2012 NBA Summer League. In September 2012, he signed with Pieno žvaigždės of Lithuania for the 2012–13 season. On December 18, 2012, he was released by Pieno žvaigždės after seven LKL games and seven Baltic League games.

In November 2013, Woodfox was reacquired by the Texas Legends. In early May 2014, he re-joined Trotamundos de Carabobo for the 2014 LPB season. He left after just two games and signed with Guerreros de Bogotá of the Baloncesto Profesional Colombiano.

On November 3, 2014, Woodfox was reacquired by the Texas Legends.

On October 30, 2016, Woodfox was acquired by the Windy City Bulls, but was waived on November 4.
