= Chad Gallagher =

American basketball player (born 1969)

Personal information
- Born: May 30, 1969 (age 57) Rockford, Illinois, U.S.
- Listed height: 6 ft 10 in (2.08 m)
- Listed weight: 255 lb (116 kg)

Career information
- High school: Boylan Catholic (Rockford, Illinois)
- College: Creighton (1987–1991)
- NBA draft: 1991: 2nd round, 32nd overall pick
- Drafted by: Phoenix Suns
- Playing career: 1991–2000
- Position: Center
- Number: 55

Career history
- 1991–1992: Caja Mayoral Málaga
- 1992: Badajoz Caja Rural
- 1992–1993: Sioux Falls Skyforce
- 1993–1994: Omaha Racers
- 1994: Utah Jazz
- 1994: Omaha Racers
- 1994–1995: Olimpia de Venado Tuerto
- 1995–1996: Rockford Lightning
- 1996: Paris Basket Racing
- 1996: Rockford Lightning
- 1996–1997: Florida Beach Dogs
- 1998: Rockford Lightning
- 1999: Libertad de Sunchales
- 1999–2000: Olimpia de Venado Tuerto

Career highlights
- MVC Player of the Year (1991); 2× First-team All-MVC (1990, 1991); Second-team All-MVC (1989)
- Stats at NBA.com
- Stats at Basketball Reference

Chad Austin Gallagher (born May 30, 1969) is a retired American professional basketball player who played briefly in the National Basketball Association (NBA). A 6'10" center played collegiately at Creighton University from 1987 to 1991, and was selected with the fifth pick in the 2nd round of the 1991 NBA draft by the Phoenix Suns.

Gallagher's NBA career consisted of 2 games for the Utah Jazz in February, 1994, playing 3 total minutes and scoring 6 points on 3-of-3 field goals.

In October 1995 he was signed by the Miami Heat but was waived prior to the start of the 1995–96 NBA season.

While playing at Creighton, he was the 1991 Missouri Valley Conference Player of the Year.
