= Ryan Kalkbrenner =

American basketball player (born 2002)

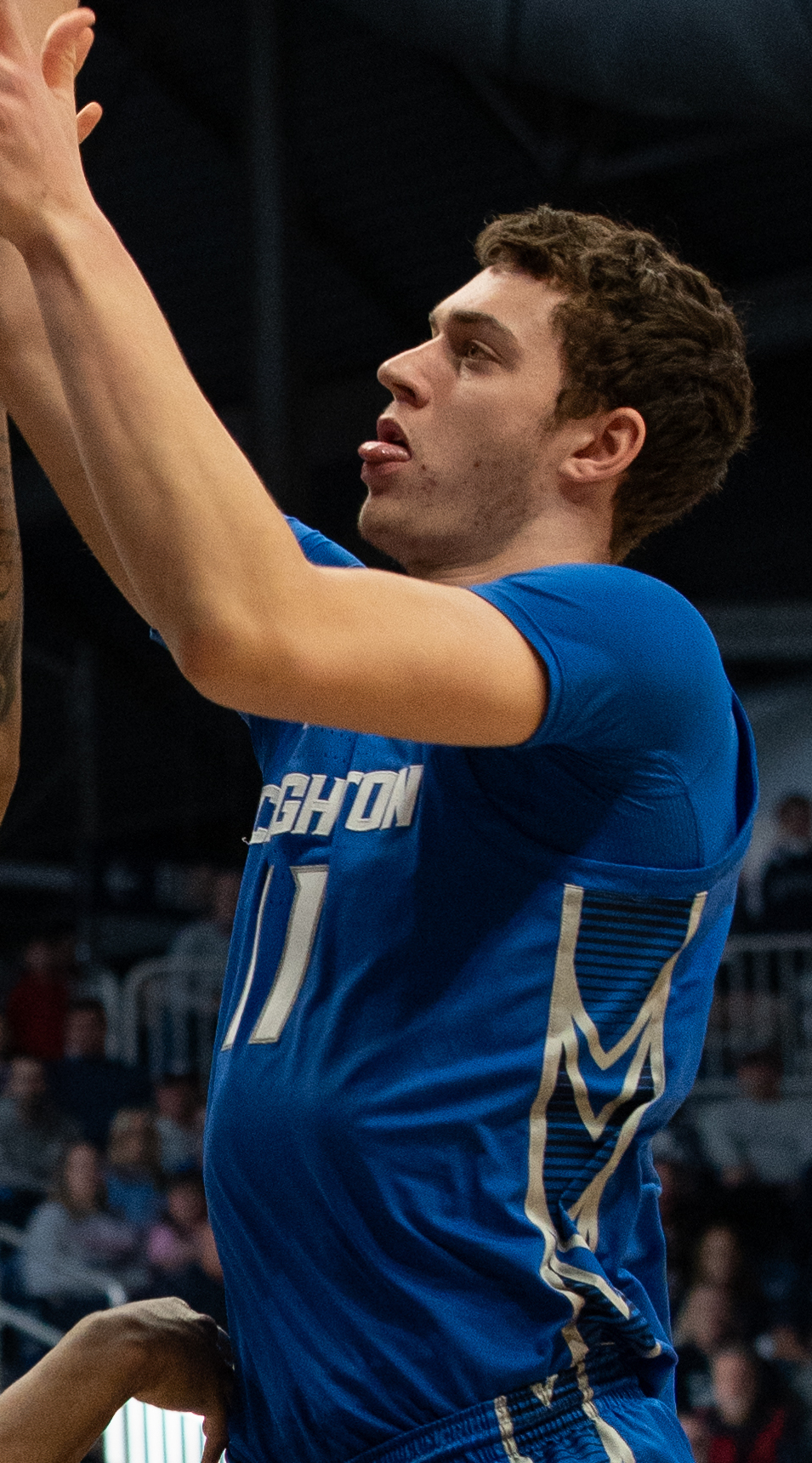
- Kalkbrenner with Creighton in 2024

No. 11 – Charlotte Hornets
- Position: Center
- League: NBA

Personal information
- Born: January 17, 2002 (age 24) St. Louis, Missouri, U.S.
- Listed height: 7 ft 1 in (2.16 m)
- Listed weight: 256 lb (116 kg)

Career information
- High school: Trinity Catholic (St. Louis, Missouri)
- College: Creighton (2020–2025)
- NBA draft: 2025: 2nd round, 34th overall pick
- Drafted by: Charlotte Hornets
- Playing career: 2025–present

Career history
- 2025–present: Charlotte Hornets

Career highlights
- Second-team All-American – USBWA, NABC (2025); Third-team All-American – AP, SN (2025); Kareem Abdul-Jabbar Award (2025); Naismith Defensive Player of the Year (2025); NABC Defensive Player of the Year (2025); 4× Big East Defensive Player of the Year (2022–2025); 2× First-team All-Big East (2023, 2025); Second-team All-Big East (2024)
- Stats at NBA.com
- Stats at Basketball Reference
Medals
Men's basketball
Representing the United States
FIBA Under-19 World Cup
Gold medal – first place	2021 Latvia	Team

Ryan Thomas Kalkbrenner (born January 17, 2002) is an American professional basketball player for the Charlotte Hornets of the National Basketball Association (NBA). He played college basketball for the Creighton Bluejays.

== High school career ==
Kalkbrenner played basketball for Trinity Catholic High School in St. Louis, Missouri. As a junior, he averaged 13.9 points, 7.6 rebounds, and 3.9 blocks per game, earning AAA Player of the Year and Class 3 All-State honors. Kalkbrenner competed for Mac Irvin Fire on the Amateur Athletic Union circuit, and was named Nike Elite Youth Basketball League Defensive Player of the Year in 2019. In his senior season, Kalkbrenner averaged 16.3 points, 11 rebounds, and 5.7 blocks per game, repeating as a Class 3 All-State selection. A consensus four-star recruit, he committed to playing college basketball for Creighton over offers from Stanford, Purdue, and Kansas.

== College career ==
Kalkbrenner came off the bench in his freshman season at Creighton. On December 17, 2020, he recorded a season-high 15 points and five rebounds in a 94–76 win over St. John's. As a freshman, Kalkbrenner averaged 5.9 points, 3.5 rebounds and 1.2 blocks per game, leading all Big East freshmen in blocks. On February 12, 2022, he scored a career-high 22 points and had 15 rebounds in an 80–66 win against Georgetown. Kalkbrenner was named Honorable Mention All-Big East as well as Defensive Player of the Year. He suffered a knee injury in a 72–69 overtime win over San Diego State in the 2022 NCAA tournament, ending his season. Kalkbrenner averaged 13.1 points and 7.7 rebounds per game.

During the following NCAA tournament, Kalkbrenner scored a career-high 31 points during a 72–63 first-round win over NC State.

On October 23, 2024, he was named 2024–25 Big East Conference Preseason Player of the Year. On November 6, he scored a career-high 49 points in a win over UT Rio Grande Valley and set a Bluejays record with 20 made field goals. Kalkbrenner averaged 19.2 points and 8.7 rebounds per game. He received the Kareem Abdul-Jabbar Award, the Naismith Defensive Player of the Year Award, and was named a Third Team All-American.

== Professional career ==
Kalkbrenner was selected with the 34th pick of the 2025 NBA draft by the Charlotte Hornets. In his NBA regular season debut on October 22, 2025, Kalkbrenner put up 10 points and 11 rebounds in a 136–117 win over the Brooklyn Nets. He also joined Emeka Okafor as the only players in Hornets franchise history to record a double-double in an NBA debut.

== National team career ==
Kalkbrenner represented the United States at the 2021 FIBA Under-19 World Cup in Latvia. He averaged 5.9 points, four rebounds and 1.3 blocks per game, helping his team win the gold medal.

== Career statistics ==
Legend
GP	Games played	GS	Games started	MPG	Minutes per game
FG%	Field goal percentage	3P%	3-point field goal percentage	FT%	Free throw percentage
RPG	Rebounds per game	APG	Assists per game	SPG	Steals per game
BPG	Blocks per game	PPG	Points per game	**Bold**	Career high

=== NBA ===
Year	Team	GP	GS	MPG	FG%	3P%	FT%	RPG	APG	SPG	BPG	PPG
2025–26	Charlotte	69	31	21.4	.753	.000	.716	5.5	.8	.5	1.5	7.6
Career		69	31	21.4	.753	.000	.716	5.5	.8	.5	1.5	7.6

=== College ===
Year	Team	GP	GS	MPG	FG%	3P%	FT%	RPG	APG	SPG	BPG	PPG
2020–21	Creighton	31	0	13.8	.645	.000	.489	3.5	.3	.2	1.2	5.9
2021–22	Creighton	34	34	29.4	.646	.250	.736	7.7	.9	.4	2.6	13.1
2022–23	Creighton	34	34	32.2	**.695**	.316	**.795**	6.1	1.2	**.6**	2.1	15.9
2023–24	Creighton	**35**	**35**	**34.7**	.646	.296	.711	7.6	1.3	.4	**3.1**	17.3
2024–25	Creighton	**35**	**35**	34.5	.653	**.344**	.681	**8.7**	**1.5**	.5	2.7	**19.2**
Career		169	138	29.3	.658	.311	.709	6.8	1.1	.4	2.4	14.5

== Personal life ==
Ryan's parents are Kraig and Lynn Kalkbrenner, and his brother is Nate Kalkbrenner. He married Rachael Saunders, a Creighton women's basketball alumna, in August 2024.

== See also ==
- List of NCAA Division I men's basketball players with 2,000 points and 1,000 rebounds
- List of NCAA Division I men's basketball career blocks leaders
- List of NCAA Division I men's basketball career games played leaders
