= Elton McGriff =

American basketball player

Personal information
- Born: August 21, 1942 Corsicana, Texas, U.S.
- Died: December 16, 2011 (aged 69)
- Listed height: 6 ft 9 in (2.06 m)
- Listed weight: 225 lb (102 kg)

Career information
- High school: Jackson (Corsicana, Texas)
- College: CC of San Francisco (1961–1963); Creighton (1963–1965)
- NBA draft: 1965: 12th round, 90th overall pick
- Drafted by: St. Louis Hawks
- Position: Center
- Number: 43, 33, 25

Career history
- 1968–1969: Dallas Chaparrals
- 1969: New Orleans Buccaneers
- 1969: Kentucky Colonels
- Stats at Basketball Reference

Elton Wayne McGriff (August 21, 1942 – December 16, 2011) was an American professional basketball player. He played in the American Basketball Association for the Dallas Chaparrals, New Orleans Buccaneers, and Kentucky Colonels spanning the 1967–68 and 1968–69 seasons.
