= Nate Funk =

American basketball player (born 1983)

Personal information
- Born: November 7, 1983 (age 43) Sioux City, Iowa
- Listed height: 6 ft 3 in (1.91 m)
- Listed weight: 195 lb (88 kg)

Career information
- High school: Bishop Heelan (Sioux City, Iowa)
- College: Creighton (2002–2007)
- NBA draft: 2007: undrafted
- Playing career: 2007–2010
- Position: Small forward

Career history
- 2007–2008: Eisbären Bremerhaven
- 2008–2010: Erdemirspor

Career highlights
- 2x first team All-MVC (2005, 2007)

Nathan Funk (born November 7, 1983) is a 6-foot-3-inch (191 cm) American basketball player who had a standout collegiate basketball career at Creighton University and played professionally in the top leagues in Germany and Turkey.

Funk was born and raised in Sioux City, Iowa where he attended Blessed Sacrament Middle School and Bishop Heelan Catholic High School.

He is the son of Timm and Jean Funk and has two siblings, Justin and Sara.

== Player profile ==
As a fifth-year senior, Funk led the 22–10 Jays to the 2007 Missouri Valley Conference title with a victory over rival Southern Illinois. After scoring 66 points in three tournament wins in St. Louis, Funk was named the tournament's Most Valuable Player. Currently, he is sixth on Creighton's all-time scoring list, behind fifth-place Kyle Korver. Funk also holds the all-time record for games played as a Bluejay.

His junior year, Funk led the team in both scoring and rebounding with averages of 17.8 and 5.1, respectively. During the 2005–06 season, he was forced to sit out the rest of the season and undergo surgery after injuring his labrum while diving for a loose ball. Creighton University requested an extra year of eligibility for Funk due to his injury. This request was approved by the NCAA. Funk's career-high in scoring, 38 points, came during a victory over Dayton four days before he received his season-ending injury. He was both named to the all-MVC team and was runner-up for Valley Player of the Year Award in 2005 and 2007.

Nate Funk played one season for Germany's Eisbären Bremerhaven basketball team. He was one of the top scorers on the team. He then played two seasons in Turkey for Erdemirspor.

== Trivia ==
- Nate Funk was the last active Creighton Bluejay player that played in an official regular season game at the Omaha Civic Auditorium.
- Nate played in 135 games in his collegiate career, which is the career record at Creighton.
- Nate's 1,754 career points placed him sixth all-time on the Creighton Bluejays career scoring chart. He also ranked 31st on the Missouri Valley Conference career scoring chart.
- Nate Funk is one of Bill Simmons' "Reggie Cleveland All-Stars" for white players with black sounding names.
- After one season Nate Funk leaves Bremerhaven.
