= Bob Harstad =

American basketball player (born 1969)

Personal information
- Born: February 7, 1969 (age 57) Loveland, Colorado, U.S.
- Listed height: 6 ft 6 in (1.98 m)
- Listed weight: 225 lb (102 kg)

Career information
- High school: Thompson Valley (Loveland, Colorado)
- College: Creighton (1987–1991)
- NBA draft: 1991: undrafted
- Playing career: 1991–2001
- Position: Power forward

Career history
- 1991–1993: Gijón Baloncesto
- 1993–1994: Estudiantes Caja Postal
- 1994–1995: Club Baloncesto Albacete
- 1995–1999: Cantabria Baloncesto
- 1999–2000: Club Ourense Baloncesto
- 2000–2001: F.C. Porto

Career highlights
- LEB MVP (1997); MVC Player of the Year (1990); 3× First-team All-MVC (1989–1991); No. 30 retired by Creighton Bluejays

Robert Joseph Harstad (born February 7, 1969) is an American former professional basketball player. In a career spanning between 1991 and 2001, Harstad played for six different teams at the highest leagues in Spain and Portugal. In his post-basketball career he has been working for Ackerman McQueen, an ad agency, in Oklahoma City, Oklahoma.

== College ==
Born in Loveland, Colorado, Harstad led Thompson Valley High School to a conference championship during his junior year and state champion runner-up his senior year. In a decidedly Big 12 Conference region of the country, Harstad instead signed to play for Tony Barone at Creighton University, a Missouri Valley Conference school in Nebraska. When he enrolled a year later in the fall of 1987 he made an immediate impact for the Bluejays. He averaged 9.0 points and 8.5 rebounds per game; his rebounding average was the fourth best in NCAA Division I for freshmen. He started every single game—something he would do for his entire four-year career—as Creighton finished with a 16–16 overall record.

Over the next three seasons, Harstad guided the Bluejays to a very successful stretch in its program's history, meanwhile earning personal accolades and setting still-standing records. In his sophomore and senior years, Creighton won both the regular season and conference tournament championships en route to berths into the 1989 and 1991 NCAA Tournaments, respectively. The Bluejays managed to upset #6 New Mexico State before losing in the round of 32 during the 1991 tournament. And, although the school failed to qualify for the NCAA Tournament in his junior year, they did get selected to play in the 1990 National Invitation Tournament. That season, Harstad averaged a career-high 22.2 points and a second-best 8.8 rebounds per game. He was chosen as the Missouri Valley Conference Player of the Year, becoming the first player from Creighton to ever win the award. During his final three seasons he was named to the All-MVC First Team as well. Harstad finished his collegiate career with 2,110 points and 1,126 rebounds, which as of 2011–12 are both the second most in school history. He is still one of just four players in conference history to finish with 2,000+ points and 1,000+ rebounds; Oscar Robertson, Xavier McDaniel, and Larry Bird also achieved this, and all three of them are in the Basketball Hall of Fame. While not a member of the Basketball Hall of Fame himself, Harstad is a member of the Missouri Valley Conference and Creighton University Halls of Fame. His number 30 jersey was also retired by the school.

== Professional ==
Harstad did not get selected in the 1991 NBA draft but did sign as a free agent with the Utah Jazz. He was released after summer league, so he went overseas to play professionally. He spent 10 seasons in Europe, the first nine of which were in Spain playing for five different teams. In 1996–97, while playing for Cantabria Baloncesto, he was named the Most Valuable Player (MVP) of the Liga Española de Baloncesto (LEB). He was an all-star selection both that season and the next. Before the 2001–02 season, Harstad was cut from F.C. Porto, a Portuguese club. Due to bad knees and a deteriorating body he decided to retire and move back to the United States.

== Personal ==
Although he attended Creighton for four years, it was not until the summer of 1993 when he finished his final 13 credit hours, thus his official graduation year is actually 1993, not 1991. Since May 2022, Harstad has been working at Feed the Children, in Oklahoma City. He is married to Lori Harstad and has two sons, Jack and Luke and two stepchildren, Gavin and Phoebe.

== See also ==
- List of NCAA Division I men's basketball players with 2000 points and 1000 rebounds
