= Creighton Bluejays men's basketball =

Men's college basketball team

2026–27 Creighton Bluejays men's basketball team
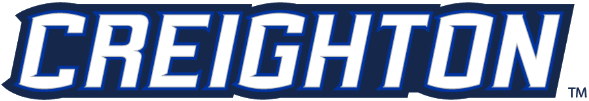
- University: Creighton University
- First season: 1911–12; 115 years ago
- Athletic director: Marcus Blossom
- Head coach: Alan Huss; 1st season, 0–0 (–)
- Location: Omaha, Nebraska
- Arena: CHI Health Center Omaha (capacity: 18,320)
- NCAA division: Division I
- Conference: Big East
- Nickname: Bluejays
- Colors: Blue, white, and navy blue
- All-time record: 1722–1101 (.610)
- NCAA tournament record: 21–27 (.438)

NCAA Division I tournament Elite Eight
- 1941, 2023
Other NCAA Division I tournament results
Sweet Sixteen	1962, 1964, 1974, 2021, 2023, 2024
Appearances	1941, 1962, 1964, 1974, 1975, 1978, 1981, 1989, 1991, 1999, 2000, 2001, 2002, 2003, 2005, 2007, 2012, 2013, 2014, 2017, 2018, 2020, 2021, 2022, 2023, 2024, 2025

Conference tournament champions
- MVC: 1978, 1981, 1989, 1991, 1999, 2000, 2002, 2003, 2005, 2007, 2012, 2013

Conference regular-season champions
- MVC: 1923, 1924, 1925, 1927, 1930, 1931, 1932, 1935, 1936, 1941, 1942, 1943, 1978, 1989, 1991, 2001, 2002, 2009, 2013 Big East: 2020

Uniforms
Home	Away	Alternate

The Creighton Bluejays men's basketball team represents Creighton University of the NCAA Division I college basketball. It competes in the Big East Conference, which it joined following the Big East conference realignment in 2013. The Bluejays play their home games at CHI Health Center Omaha in Omaha, Nebraska. Creighton finished sixth nationally in home attendance, averaging 17,048 fans per home game in 2014–15.

Before joining the Big East, Creighton was a member of the Missouri Valley Conference from 1976 through 2013. The Jays were also members of the MVC from 1928 to 1948 and participated as an independent from 1948 to 1977 before rejoining the MVC. The Bluejays have won a record 15 MVC regular season conference titles and a record 12 MVC tournament titles.

The team has 27 appearances in the NCAA tournament. The Jays last played in the NCAA Tournament in 2025, and have won at least one NCAA tournament game each of the last four seasons.

Creighton reached the second weekend of the NCAA Division I men's basketball tournament for the first time in 2021, before losing to eventual runner-up Gonzaga in the Sweet Sixteen. In 2023, they reached their second Elite Eight Regional Final in program history before losing to eventual runner-up San Diego State.

== History ==
=== Arthur Schabinger era (1923–1935) ===
Arthur Schabinger took over the program after Kearney's graduation. He guided the team into its first conference, the North Central Conference, in 1923. His teams would win 4 titles in the league. In 1928, Shabinger would again guide Creighton to another conference, the Missouri Valley Conference. Creighton's winningest men's basketball coach for 75 years, Arthur A. Schabinger helped build the Creighton basketball program. Schabinger posted a 165–66 record as coach of the Bluejays from 1922 to 1935. Eleven of his 13 teams finished first or second in the league, including eight teams that won or tied for the title.

=== Eddie Hickey era (1936–1947) ===
Eddie Hickey took over the program for the 1935–36 season. Hickey was reared in small-town Nebraska and graduated from Creighton University School of Law in 1926. Sawed-off at 5'5", Edward 'The Little Giant' Hickey was a dynamic chunky man who had quarterbacked Creighton university football in the Roaring 20's. He was enamored more by the game he could teach if not, obviously lacking size, play well. He was the head coach of both the football and basketball teams at Creighton Prep for eight years before moving to Creighton University.

Hickey was a master of the fast break and winning. He immediately led the Bluejays to the Missouri Valley title in his first season. Their fast break – 'controlled fast break' Eddie would emphasize sarcastically – featured an explosive movement that required the ball not to hit the floor. 'The Little Giant' would take Creighton to new heights by the early 1940s, with 1943 Consensus First Team All American Ed Beisser in the middle and his high powered offense. Hickey would lead the Jays to their first NCAA tournament and two National Invitation Tournaments, including a Final Four (Third-place game winner) in 1942, (when the NIT was bigger than the NCAA tournament). With his flair for 'run-sheep-run' basketball, Hickey and his teams were a good show in the Big Apple.

World War II would briefly suspend Creighton's basketball program and Hickey would return to coach for one year after the war before moving on to St. Louis. His 126–71 record and four conference titles in nine seasons at Creighton was followed by success in St. Louis and later Marquette. Edgar Hickey would go down as a hall of fame coach with a 36-year college career of 570–268.

=== Post-war era (1948–1959) ===
The post-war era was full of change and mediocrity for the Jays. Future athletic director Julius 'Duce' Belford coached the Jays immediately after the war. Creighton would leave the Missouri Valley Conference and switch from Division I to Division III during this era. The Jays would not find success at this new level. Belford finished with a 56–83 record over six seasons. His successors would not fare better. Sebastian 'Subby' Salerno took the reins in 1952 and left three years later. Salerno finished with a 30–45 record. Theron Thomsen replaced Salerno and found some success. After eight losing seasons, Thomsen's 1956–57 Bluejays would post a 15–6 mark. However, the Jays would slide back toward mediocrity finishing 10–12 and 13–9 in the following two seasons. In 1959, Athletic Director Duce Belford made it a priority to bring back the once proud Creighton basketball program.

=== John 'Red' McManus era (1960–1969) ===
John J. 'Red' McManus came to Creighton after a successful career of eight seasons at St. Ambrose Academy and a year as head freshman and assistant varsity coach at Iowa. The 1959–60 Bluejays were a far cry from the previous year's team. Whereas the team had previously utilized a slow methodical type of basketball, McManus brought a fast break offense and a box zone defense. Utilizing sharp recruiting and tough coaching, Red quickly had the Bluejays back on the road to becoming a national power. The 1961–62 Creighton Bluejays men's basketball team finished 21–5 and reached the Sweet Sixteen of the 1962 NCAA Division I men's basketball tournament, going on to win the third spot in the NCAA Regional. Paul Silas was the nation's top rebounder.

The 1963–64 Bluejays finished with a 22–7 record, a record for most wins in a season. All-American and team captain Paul Silas rounded his collegiate basketball career by leading the team back to the Sweet Sixteen in the 1964 NCAA Division I men's basketball tournament. Silas, who guided the Bluejays to two NCAA tournament berths in his three-year career, led the nation in rebounding his sophomore and junior years.

McManus would continue to coach at Creighton until 1969. He would go down as the third-winningest coach in school history, leaving with a 138–118 mark. Red McManus was a colorful character, with a mean streak who was always a respected gentleman off the court. He rebuilt the Jays' schedules into coast-to-coast clashes with the nation's top basketball powers. His teams got NCAA post-season tourney bids in 1962 and 1964, and his players included professionals Paul Silas, Neil Johnson, Elton McGriff, Bob Portman and Wally Anderzunas. McManus resigned after building a schedule of national prominence-the job he was hired to do.

=== Eddie Sutton era (1970–1974) ===
One of college basketball's legendary coaches, Eddie Sutton got his first Division I head coaching job at Creighton. Sutton left College of Southern Idaho in 1969 to coach at Creighton. It was with the Bluejays that he made his first coaching appearance in the NCAA tournament in 1974. With a patient passing offense, he led the Bluejays to an 82–50 mark between 1969 and 1974.

Sutton's career coincided with the apex of the Travelin’ Jays Era. Red McManus coined the phrase "border to border and coast to coast" in 1959 when he began the Travelin’ Jays era, but it was under Eddie Sutton that the philosophy really bore fruit and gained the Jays national recognition. During his last three years at Creighton, the Bluejays played in 36 cities and 20 states, logged more than 65,000 miles in the air, made a South American jaunt (entertaining the Chile national team at home in exchange), and visited Hawaii. Sutton was a Tulsa native, and in 1974 a bidding war commenced between Oral Roberts, Duke, and Arkansas for Sutton's services. Arkansas won the battle, announcing Sutton as their new head coach on March 27, 1974.

Over a 37 year coaching career, Sutton compiled an 804–328 record, putting him eighth on the all-time Division I wins list. He became the first coach to lead four schools to the NCAA Tournament, taking Creighton, Arkansas, Kentucky, and Oklahoma State.

=== Tom Apke era (1975–1981) ===
Assistant coach Tom Apke took over for the departing Sutton. Apke planned to run the same defensive schemes Sutton had: namely, a fierce man-to-man base defense, with a 2–3 zone as a change-up. The offense was where major changes were made. Apke looked to run a fast break at every opportunity, taking advantage of every shot opportunity. The news media was pessimistic as Apke entered his first season. Prognostications grew even worse after Mike Heck, Creighton's first 7 footer and a rising star, suddenly died because of an enlarged heart after the first game of the season. The 1974–75 Creighton Bluejays rallied after Heck's death and ended up reaching the 1975 NCAA tournament finishing with a 20–7 record.

Apke led Creighton back to the Missouri Valley Conference in 1977 after 29 years of independence. He found instant success winning the 1978 conference regular and conference tournament titles and advancing to the 1978 NCAA tournament. The Bluejays would continue winning at a high level again returning to postseason play in the 1981 NCAA tournament.

After the 1980–81 season, Apke accepted the head coaching position at Colorado. Apke spent 17 years in all at Creighton – four as a player, six as an assistant coach and seven as head coach. He is the only coach in school history to have led Creighton to the NCAA Tournament in his first season with the team (1974–75). A team captain on Creighton's 1964–65 team, Apke went on to coach the Jays to a 130–64 record from 1974 to 1981. Three of his teams went to NCAA tournaments and another to the National Invitation Tournament.

=== Willis Reed era (1982–1985) ===
Sutton and Apke's departures upset Creighton officials who yearned to make the program 'big time'. Officials hinted that the new head coach would be a 'big name' hire. Former New York Knicks great Willis Reed fit the bill. After being fired in 1978 after a season and a fraction as the Knicks' coach, Reed was determined to prove himself as a coach. Reed accepted the position at Creighton, generating controversy in the Bluejay community.

Longtime assistant coach Tom Broshnihan, who had been around since Sutton, was seen as the rightful heir to the Creighton head coaching job. A sizable segment of the fan-base criticized Reed as lacking experience in college coaching and recruiting. High school basketball in Nebraska produced a record number of prospects prior to Willis Reed's first season. Reed was unable to sign any of the blue-chips, including Ron Kellogg and Dave Hoppen. It did not help that Reed was breaking the color barrier, becoming the first black head basketball coach at Creighton.

Coming off Tom Apke's impressive 21–9 season featuring an NCAA appearance, Reed's inaugural 7–20 mark added fuel to the fire. Reed proved himself as a recruiter that off-season. Considered by many scouts to be the top prospect in the country, Benoit Benjamin was sought by 350 colleges. Benjamin came from a single-mother home and looked for a father figure, preferably a college coach who had played center. Fortunately for Creighton, coach Willis Reed was a former seven-time NBA All-Star center with the Knicks and a member of the Hall of Fame.

Benjamin's signing gave Reed instant credibility as a recruiter. Despite the landmark signing, the Jays would again struggle in 1982–83 finishing with an 8–19 record. Coach Reed worked with Benjamin over the off-season. Benoit came back as a sophomore in 1983–84 and dominated college basketball. The Bluejays would reach the NIT that year finishing 17–14. The 1984–85 season team would win 20 games. As a junior during the 1984–85 season, Benoit Benjamin led all of NCAA Division I in blocked shots and was the nation's second-leading rebounder. Benoit Benjamin would leave for the NBA following the season. A two-time AP All-America center for the Bluejays, Benoit Benjamin would begin a 15-year NBA career in 1985 as the third overall draft pick in the first round by the Los Angeles Clippers. He would go down as the all-time leader for blocked shots in Missouri Valley Conference history with 411 rejections. Coach Reed had proven himself as a coach, recruiting a top prospect and developing him into one of the nation's best.

Willis Reed resigned as coach of the Creighton University basketball team after the 1984–85 season. He compiled a 52–65 record at Creighton. His 1984–85 Bluejays were 20–12 but lost their last six games. Reed felt that he would be unable to maintain a high level of success without violating NCAA rules.

=== Tony Barone era (1985–1991) ===
Inheriting Reed's team was fiery Tony Barone. His 1985–86 team posted a 12–16 record, finishing tied for fifth in the Valley. Coach Barone's second team would fare even worse finishing 9–19. During the off-season, Creighton would bring in a talented class of freshman including Bob Harstad and Chad Gallagher. The pair would go down in Creighton lore as the Dynamic Duo. The 1987–88 squad would exhibit markedly improved play, finishing 16–16 after playing a schedule featuring some of the top teams in the country.

The 1988–89 team would be Tony Barone's breakthrough team. Creighton surprised everyone outside Omaha and claimed its first regular season MVC championship in 11 years. The Bluejays would cap the season by winning the MVC conference tournament in epic fashion. The conference championship saw Harstad lead the Jays over Southern Illinois 79–77. The game was punctuated by a James Farr game winner with 2 seconds remaining. Creighton clinched an automatic berth to the 1989 NCAA tournament with the win.

Creighton followed up their NCAA Tournament berth in 1988–89 by winning more games overall than the year before, going 21–12 in 1989–90. The consensus favorite to repeat as MVC champions, they got off to a good start, as they scored wins over Iowa State and Notre Dame before going on the road and taking #5 Missouri to the wire. They would finish tied for second in the conference and bow out of the conference tournament semifinals. Juniors Bob Harstad and Chad Gallagher would have break out seasons. Harstad would win the 1990 Missouri Valley Conference Player of the Year Award. Gallagher would finish as runner-up.

Expectation were high entering the Dynamic Duo's senior season. The 1990–91 Creighton Bluejays finished as one of the school's all-time best, finishing 24–8. The Jays claimed both the regular season and conference tournament crowns before advancing to the second round of the 1991 NCAA tournament. Chad Gallagher was named the 1991 Missouri Valley Conference Player of the Year. Gallagher and Harstad both rank in the top five all-time in both scoring and rebounding for Creighton. Together they won two MVC regular season and conference tournament titles as well as two NCAA and one NIT appearances. Following the 1990–91 season, coach Tony Barone accepted the head coaching job at Texas A&M.

=== Rick Johnson era (1991–1994) ===
Assistant coach Rick Johnson was promoted to head coach following Tony Barone's departure. Johnson's tenure at Creighton was a struggle. His teams finished with progressively worse records. He left after the 1993–94 season in which the team posted a 7–22 mark. Johnson finished with a 24–59 record over three seasons at Creighton.

=== Dana Altman era (1995–2010) ===
==== Rodney Buford era ====
Dana Altman, a Wilber, Nebraska native, left his position as head coach at Kansas State for Creighton in 1994. Altman immediately went to work rejuvenating the program. He struggled at first posting a 7–19 record in his first year. That off-season, Altman signed Rodney Buford. Altman's Jays improved to 14–15 and 15–15 the following two seasons. After the 1996–97 season, coach Altman brought in talented prospects Ryan Sears and Ben Walker. The two, along with Buford, would help rebuild Creighton into a college basketball power. The 1997–98 team finished 18–10 and reached the NIT. The 1998–99 team would finish second in the Valley and reach the 1999 NCAA tournament after claiming the MVC conference tournament title. The Jays reached the second round following a 62–58 first-round victory over Louisville. Rodney Buford would finish as the all-time leading scorer for the Jays, with 2,116 points.

==== Ryan Sears & Ben Walker era ====
The 1999–2000 would repeat as MVC conference tournament champions, earning a berth in the 2000 NCAA tournament. Led by Juniors Ryan Sears and Ben Walker and MVC Newcomer of the Year Kyle Korver, the Jays would finish with a 23–10 record. The 2000–01 team improved to 24–8 and won the first Missouri Valley Conference regular season title in 9 seasons. Senior guards Ryan Sears and Ben Walker finished their careers with another trip to the NCAA tournament. Creighton's field marshal, Sears started every game of his 4-year career and finished each of his four seasons with more steals than turnovers. Walker, Creighton's go-to player during late-game situations, finished with 1,238 points and 677 rebounds.

==== Kyle Korver era ====
The 2001–02 team was replacing both Ben Walker and Ryan Sears and defending a regular season MVC crown, yet behind Kyle Korver's brilliance, they shared the league title and won the MVC Tournament while having a nearly identical record as the year before at 23–9. Korver's deadly 3-point shooting forced many teams to employ a box and one defense against the Creighton star. Despite the added attention, Korver scored 20 or more points 10 times. The Creighton-Southern Illinois Rivalry reached its peak during the early 2000s. Korver scored a combined 49 points in two regular season losses before leading the Jays to victory over the Salukis 84–76 in the conference championship game. Kyle Korver was named the 2002 MVC Player of the Year. In the 2002 NCAA Tournament, the Jays vanquished Florida in the first round. Korver fouled out late in the second overtime and saved the late game heroics for Terrell Taylor, who drained a buzzer-beating three-pointer.

The Bluejay bandwagon was growing and the Jays consistently sold out the 9,377 capacity Civic. Expectations were at a record high entering the 2002–03 season. Creighton would live up to most of them, setting a school record for wins. The team went 29–5 and was ranked in the top 25 most of the season. Kyle Korver would be chosen by ESPN's Dick Vitale as the 2002–03 Midseason National Player of the Year. Korver would set a school record with nine three-pointers against Evansville and repeat as MVC conference Player of the Year. The Jays would finish second in the Valley behind rivals Southern Illinois, but once again knock off the Salukis in the conference championship game throttling them 80–56. The Jays would finish ranked 15th following the 2003 NCAA tournament.

Two-time league Player of the Year Kyle Korver ranks as one of the top players in Creighton and Missouri Valley Conference history. Korver finished his career tied for sixth in NCAA history with 371 three-pointers while placing 14th in accuracy at 45.3 percent from long-range. Korver helped lead Creighton's return to the top-25 and garnered unprecedented attention for his all-around play. He had a successful NBA career and last played for the Milwaukee Bucks in September 2020. As of April 2022, he is a free agent.

==== Nate Funk era ====
Creighton's basketball program had grown too big for the Civic Auditorium and the Jays moved into the 17,975 seat Qwest Center, now known as CHI Health Center, prior to the 2003–04 season. The Jays would fill up the arena on a consistent basis and become one of the nation's perennial leaders in attendance.

The sharpshooter torch was passed from Kyle Korver to sophomore guard Nate Funk for the 2003–04 season. He responded by leading the team in both scoring and assists. The 2003–04 Jays would finish 20–9 and reach the NIT. Funk took a massive leap forward his junior year, going from the best player on his own team to arguably the best player in the league. The 2004–05 team finished 23–11 and won the MVC conference crown. Nate Funk was runner-up for the conference player of the year and the Bluejays earned a berth in the 2005 NCAA tournament.

The 2005–06 Creighton men's basketball team entered the season with high hopes that were cut short when star guard Nate Funk went down with injury in a game at DePaul. Funk would try to make a comeback but wasn't the player he had been. He would request and receive a medical redshirt. Without Funk, the Bluejays still managed a 20–10 record reaching the second round of the 2006 NIT.

Nate Funk returned for his fifth season and center Anthony Tolliver emerged as one of the best players in the conference. Although the team 2006–07 team struggled early, the team found its groove down the stretch as Funk scored 20 or more points in 11 games and Tolliver dominated the post. The 2006–07 team finished 22–11 and won the MVC conference tournament over rival Southern Illinois 67–61 to earn a berth in the 2007 NCAA tournament. For his career, Nate Funk had 1,754 points, which ranks sixth all-time in Creighton history.

==== Arkansas fiasco ====
On April 2, 2007, Altman announced that he would become the head coach for the Arkansas Razorbacks, in a deal that was rumored to be a five-year, $1.5 million per year contract. Only one day later he had a change of heart and returned to Omaha and his team at Creighton, citing family reasons. Altman never again reached the NCAA Tournament at Creighton even though his teams would continue to post 20 win seasons.

The 2007–08 team finished the season 22–11, but would lose in the quarterfinals of the MVC tournament. The Bluejays received an invitation to the NIT where they defeated Rhode Island before losing to Florida. The 2009 Bluejays shared the MVC regular season title and was led by Booker Woodfox. Despite the Bluejays gaudy 26–7 record, a loss to Illinois State in the semifinals of the MVC Tournament led to another trip to the NIT where they would lose in the second round to Kentucky. The 2009–10 team would be Altman's last, finishing 18–16. Dana Altman accepted the head coaching position at Oregon shortly after the season ended.

Creighton's second winningest coach with 327 wins, Dana Altman was the only coach in MVC history to lead his school to seven straight years of improved records. Altman won three MVC regular-season titles, six MVC Tournament crowns, and led his troops to 13 consecutive postseason bids.

=== Greg McDermott years (2010–2026) ===
Former Northern Iowa coach Greg McDermott resigned from Iowa State and accepted the head coaching job at Creighton following Altman's departure. The 2010–11 Jays finished 23–16 and reached the finals of the College Basketball Invitational to face their former head coach's new team, Oregon. The Ducks would win the best-of-three series two games to one. The following year, the Jays featured senior point guard Antoine Young and Rutgers transfer Gregory Echenique in the post. Coach McDermott's son, Doug McDermott, emerged as a star player, being named a consensus first-team All-American and MVC Player of the Year in both 2012 and 2013. In 2012, Creighton finished second in the Valley during the regular season and won the MVC Conference tournament. Finishing the season 29–6, they advanced to the second round of the NCAA tournament by beating Alabama before falling to North Carolina. In 2013, Creighton won both the MVC regular-season and Tournament titles, ending the season 28–7. They defeated Cincinnati in the first round before losing to No. 2-seeded Duke in the second round.

Shortly after the end of the 2013 season, Creighton was one of three schools invited to join the Big East Conference by the "Catholic 7", the group of schools that split from the original Big East to form a non-football version of the league.

In their first season in the Big East, Creighton finished as runner-up in both the regular season (to Villanova) and Tournament (to Providence). Doug McDermott was named Big East Player of the Year, was again named a consensus first-team All-American, and was the consensus national player of the year. Also, McDermott became only the eighth player in Division I men's basketball history to score 3,000 career points, finishing fifth on the all-time scoring list. The Jays received a No. 3 seed in the NCAA tournament, their highest seeding ever. They beat Louisiana-Lafayette in the second round, but lost to No. 6-seeded Baylor in the Third Round.

With the departure of Doug McDermott to the NBA, the 2015 Bluejays struggled to a 14–19 record, their worst finish since 1995. In 2016, the Bluejays improved to 20–15, finishing in sixth place in the Big East and receiving an invite to the NIT. They advanced to the NIT quarterfinals before losing to BYU.

The 2017 Bluejays returned to a conference power, beginning the season 13–0. Led by senior point guard Maurice Watson Jr, the Bluejays moved to 18–1 (their only loss to No. 1 Villanova) before Watson tore his ACL and was lost for the remainder of the season. Shortly after he was injured, Watson was arrested for sexual assault and was suspended from the team. With the loss of Watson, the Bluejays lost seven of their remaining 12 games to finish the regular season at 23–8 and in a tie for third place in the Big East. They were able to rebound in the Big East tournament, advancing to the championship game before losing to Villanova. They received an at-large bid to the NCAA tournament as a No. 6 seed and lost to Rhode Island in the first round.

In June 2017, Coach McDermott received interest from the Ohio State University to fill its head coaching vacancy. However, he turned down the offer choosing to remain at Creighton.

On March 22, 2022, McDermott received a "multi-year" contract extension. The terms of the deal were not disclosed. The Bluejays finished the 2022–23 season with a 24–12 record. They advanced to the Elite Eight for the second time in school history, and first time since 1941.

On March 8, 2024, McDermott received another contract extension to keep him at Creighton through the 2027–2028 season; his previous contract was due to expire after the end of the 2025–2026 season. The new contract also makes McDermott one of the highest-paid coaches in the Big East. On November 13, 2024, McDermott became Creighton's all-time winningest coach.

== Facilities ==
=== Vinardi Center ===
The Bluejays went 336–92 (.785) in 42 seasons in the 3,000-seat Vinardi Center (then known as University Gym) from the time Creighton began sponsoring men's basketball in 1916 through the 1959–60 season. Creighton split its home games between University Gym and the Omaha Civic Auditorium from 1955 to 1960 before moving into the Civic full-time for the 1960–61 year.

=== Omaha Civic Auditorium ===
Home to Creighton men's basketball from 1955 to 2003, the Omaha Civic Auditorium provided a tremendous home-court advantage for the Jays. Creighton went 434–155 (.737) overall in the facility. The Civic was home to five regular-season MVC champs and eight MVC Tournament champs before the CU men closed their run at the Civic in 2003 with six straight sellouts. The Jays returned to the Civic for the first time in seven years in 2010, winning two CIT games when CenturyLink Center Omaha was booked.

=== CHI Health Center Omaha ===
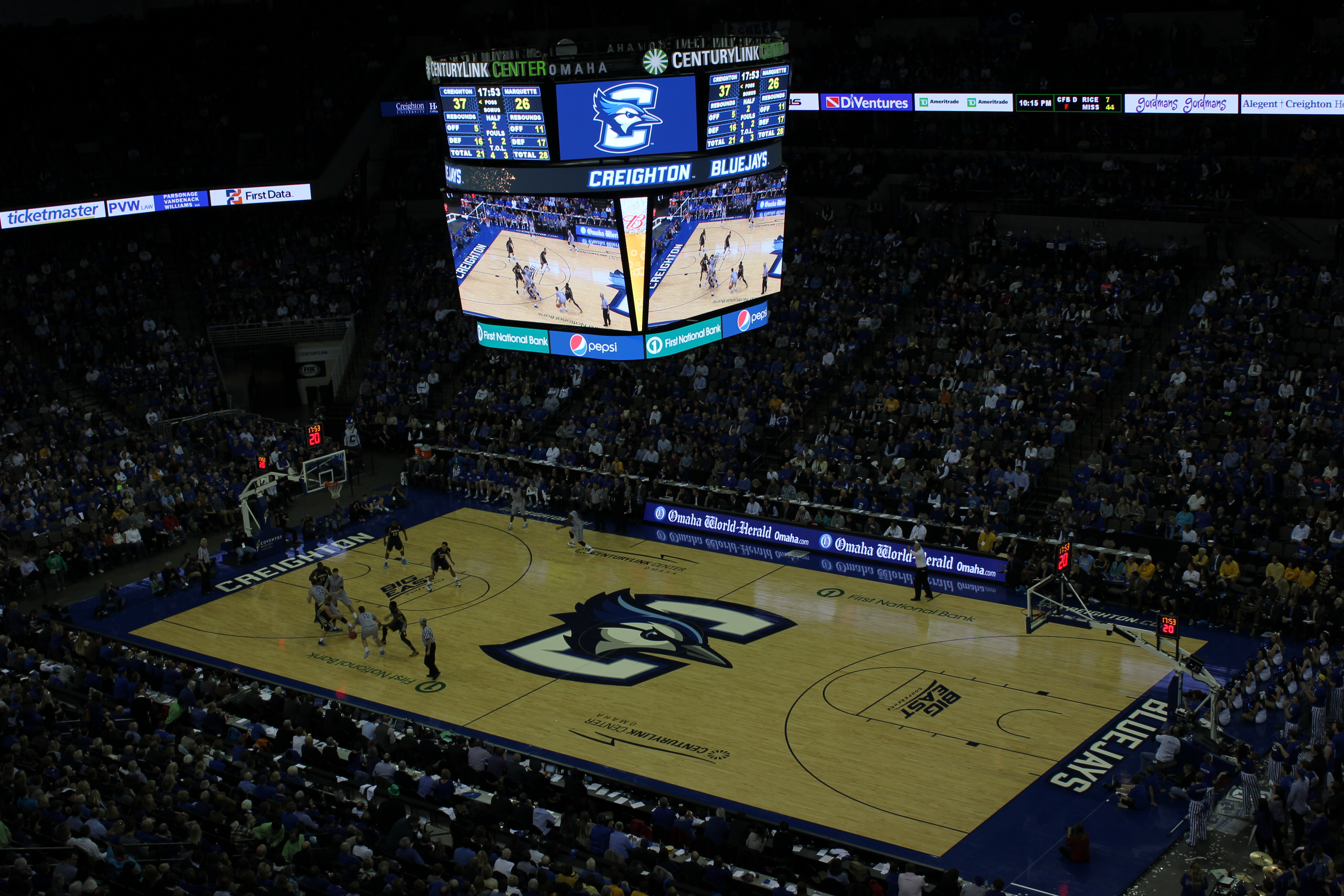
Creighton playing at CHI Health Center Omaha

Home to Creighton men's basketball since 2003, CHI Health Center Omaha ranks as one of college basketball's best venues. The arena was originally known as Qwest Center Omaha, changing in 2011 to CenturyLink Center Omaha after Qwest was purchased by CenturyLink. When CenturyLink opted out of the naming rights contract after the 2017–18 season, a new deal was reached with locally based healthcare provider CHI Health, and the arena was accordingly renamed in September 2018. Creighton finished sixth nationally in home attendance, averaging 17,048 fans per home game in 2014–15. It's the ninth straight season that Creighton has been among the nation's top-25 in average home attendance. During their time in the Missouri Valley, they set multiple average home attendance records.

==== Dancing Grandma ====
Mary Ann Filippi, known as 'Dancing Grandma', was a fixture at Creighton basketball home games and a local celebrity. She had been attending Creighton men's basketball games since the Red McManus Era, rarely missing home games. Filippi quickly became a video-board favorite after the move to Qwest Center. Whenever the camera would show her cheering for her beloved Bluejays, the arena would erupt in cheers. She often hyped up the crowd with her signature 'Raise the Roof' dance and had appeared in several Athletic Department videos and television broadcasts. She was popular with Creighton students and fans alike, who often posed for pictures with her prior to tip-off. Filippi died on September 28, 2015, at the age of 92.

== Postseason results ==
=== NCAA tournament results ===
The Bluejays have appeared in 26 NCAA Tournaments. Their combined record is 21–27.

Year	Seed	Round	Opponent	Result
1941		Elite Eight; Regional Third Place Game	Washington State; Wyoming	L 39–48; W 45–44
1962		First Round; Sweet Sixteen; Regional Third Place Game	Memphis State; Cincinnati; Texas Tech	W 87–83; L 46–66; W 63–61
1964		First Round; Sweet Sixteen; Regional Third Place Game	Oklahoma City; Wichita; Texas Western	W 89–78; L 68–84; L 52–63
1974		First Round; Sweet Sixteen; Regional Third Place Game	Texas; Kansas; Louisville	W 77–61; L 54–55; W 80–71
1975		First Round	Maryland	L 79–83
1978		First Round	DePaul	L 78–80
1981	#8	First Round	#9 St. Joseph's	L 57–59
1989	#14	First Round	#3 Missouri	L 69–85
1991	#11	First Round; Second Round	#6 New Mexico State #3 Seton Hall	W 64–56; L 69–81
1999	#10	First Round; Second Round	#7 Louisville #2 Maryland	W 62–58; L 63–75
2000	#10	First Round	#7 Auburn	L 69–72
2001	#10	First Round	#7 Iowa	L 56–69
2002	#12	First Round; Second Round	#5 Florida #4 Illinois	W 83–82; L 60–72
2003	#6	First Round	#11 Central Michigan	L 73–79
2005	#10	First Round	#7 West Virginia	L 61–63
2007	#10	First Round	#7 Nevada	L 71–77 ^{OT}
2012	#8	Second Round; Third Round	#9 Alabama #1 North Carolina	W 58–57; L 73–87
2013	#7	Second Round; Third Round	#10 Cincinnati #2 Duke	W 67–63; L 50–66
2014	#3	Second Round; Third Round	#14 Louisiana–Lafayette #6 Baylor	W 76–66; L 55–85
2017	#6	First Round	#11 Rhode Island	L 72–84
2018	#8	First Round	#9 Kansas State	L 59–69
2021	#5	First Round; Second Round; Sweet Sixteen	#12 UC Santa Barbara #13 Ohio #1 Gonzaga	W 63–62; W 72–58; L 65–83
2022	#9	First Round; Second Round	#8 San Diego State #1 Kansas	W 72–69 ^{OT} L 72–79
2023	#6	First Round; Second Round; Sweet Sixteen; Elite Eight	#11 NC State #3 Baylor #15 Princeton #5 San Diego State	W 72–63; W 85–76; W 86–75; L 56–57
2024	#3	First Round; Second Round; Sweet Sixteen	#14 Akron #11 Oregon #2 Tennessee	W 77–60; W 86–73^{2OT} L 75–82
2025	#9	First Round; Second Round	#8 Louisville #1 Auburn	W 89–75; L 70–82

=== NIT results ===
The Bluejays have appeared in 12 National Invitation Tournaments (NIT). Their combined record is 9–12.

Year	Round	Opponent	Result
1942	Quarterfinals; Semifinals; Third Place Game	West Texas State; Western Kentucky; Toledo	W 59–58; L 36–49; W 48–46
1943	Quarterfinals	Washington & Jefferson	L 42–43
1977	First Round	Illinois State	L 58–65
1984	First Round	Nebraska	L 54–56
1990	First Round	DePaul	L 72–89
1998	First Round	Marquette	L 68–80
2004	Opening Round	Nebraska	L 70–71
2006	First Round; Second Round	Akron; Miami (FL)	W 71–60; L 52–53
2008	First Round; Second Round	Rhode Island; Florida	W 74–73; L 54–82
2009	First Round; Second Round	Bowling Green; Kentucky	W 73–71; L 63–65
2016	First Round; Second Round; Quarterfinals	Alabama; Wagner; BYU	W 72–54; W 87–54; L 82–88
2019	First Round; Second Round; Quarterfinals	Loyola–Chicago; Memphis; TCU	W 70–61; W 79–67; L 58–71

=== CBC results ===
The Bluejays have appeared in one College Basketball Crown (CBC). Their record is 1–0.

Year	Round	Opponent	Result
2026	Quarterfinals; Semifinals	Rutgers; West Virginia	W 82–69; TBD

=== CBI results ===
The Bluejays have appeared in one College Basketball Invitational (CBI). Their record is 4–2. They were runner-up in 2011.

Year	Round	Opponent	Result
2011	First Round; Quarterfinals; Semifinals; Finals–Game 1 Finals–Game 2 Finals–Game 3	San Jose State; Davidson; Central Florida; Oregon; Oregon; Oregon	W 77–70; W 102–92; W 82–64; W 84–76; L 58–71; L 69–71

=== CIT results ===
The Bluejays have appeared in one CollegeInsider.com Tournament (CIT). Their combined record is 2–1.

Year	Round	Opponent	Result
2010	First Round; Quarterfinals; Semifinals	South Dakota; Fairfield; Missouri State	W 89–78; W 73–55; L 61–67

== Notable players ==
National Player of the Year Awards
2012	Doug McDermott	Lute Olson Award
2014	Doug McDermott	Wooden Award, Naismith, AP, SN, NABC, Oscar Robertson, Lute Olson Award
2025	Ryan Kalkbrenner	Kareem Abdul-Jabbar Award, Naismith DPOY, NABC DPOY

Conference Player of the Year Awards
1990	Bob Harstad	Forward	Missouri Valley
1991	Chad Gallagher	Center	Missouri Valley
2002	Kyle Korver	Forward	Missouri Valley
2003	Kyle Korver	Forward	Missouri Valley
2009	Booker Woodfox	Guard	Missouri Valley
2012	Doug McDermott	Forward	Missouri Valley
2013	Doug McDermott	Forward	Missouri Valley
2014	Doug McDermott	Forward	Big East

=== All-Americans ===
Creighton's men's basketball program has produced 37 All-Americans in 95 seasons, beginning with Leonard F. "Jimmy" Lovley in 1923 and 1924.

- 1923: Leonard 'Jimmy' Lovley
- 1924: Leonard 'Jimmy' Lovley
- 1927: Sidney Corenman
- 1929: Werner 'Brud' Jensen, Center
- 1931: Maurice Van Ackeren, Forward
- 1933: Conrad Collin, Forward
- 1933: Arthur Kiely, Guard
- 1943: Ed Beisser, Center
- 1943: Ralph Langer, Forward
- 1958: Jim Berry
- 1959: Jim Berry
- 1959: Dick Harvey
- 1960: Jack Chapman
- 1960: Dick Hartmann
- 1960: Dick Harvey
- 1961: Herb Millard
- 1961: Chuck Officer
- 1962: Paul Silas, Center
- 1963: Paul Silas, Center
- 1964: Paul Silas, Center
- 1968: Bob Portman, Forward
- 1974: Gene Harmon, Forward
- 1976: Rick Apke, Forward
- 1977: Rick Apke, Forward
- 1978: Rick Apke, Forward
- 1983: Benoit Benjamin, Center
- 1984: Benoit Benjamin, Center
- 1985: Benoit Benjamin, Center
- 1985: Vernon Moore, Guard
- 1989: James Farr, Guard
- 1999: Rodney Buford, Guard
- 2002: Kyle Korver, Forward
- 2003: Kyle Korver, Forward
- 2007: Nate Funk, Guard
- 2007: Anthony Tolliver, Center
- 2009: Booker Woodfox, Guard
- 2012: Doug McDermott, Forward
- 2013: Doug McDermott, Forward
- 2014: Doug McDermott, Forward
- 2024: Baylor Scheierman, Guard
- 2025: Ryan Kalkbrenner, Center

=== Academic All-Americans ===
- 1970: Dennis Bresnahan
- 1977: Rick Apke, Forward
- 1978: Rick Apke, Forward
- 1990: Bill O'Dowd
- 2003: Michael Lindeman, Forward
- 2004: Michael Lindeman, Forward
- 2004: Brody Deren, Center
- 2007: Anthony Tolliver, Center
- 2018: Tyler Clement, Guard

=== All-Conference ===
The Creighton Bluejays played 54 seasons in the Missouri Valley Conference, producing 89 all-conference players including 55 first team selections, 34 second team selections, and 7 conference player of the year selections. In Creighton's first season in the Big East Conference, Doug McDermott was named a first-team all-conference selection and the Big East player of the year.

==== Big East First Team ====
- 2014: Doug McDermott, Forward
- 2017: Marcus Foster, Guard
- 2018: Marcus Foster, Guard
- 2020: Ty-Shon Alexander, Guard
- 2021: Marcus Zegarowski, Guard
- 2023: Ryan Kalkbrenner, Center
- 2024: Baylor Scheierman, Guard
- 2025: Ryan Kalkbrenner, Center

==== Big East Second Team ====
- 2016: Maurice Watson Jr., Guard
- 2017: Justin Patton, Center
- 2018: Khyri Thomas, Guard
- 2020: Marcus Zegarowski, Guard
- 2021: Damien Jefferson, Guard
- 2024: Trey Alexander, Guard
- 2024: Ryan Kalkbrenner, Center

==== Missouri Valley First Team ====
- 1929: Werner 'Brud' Jensen, Center
- 1929: Fritz Kampf, Forward
- 1930: Bart Corcoran, Guard
- 1930: Werner 'Brud' Jensen, Center
- 1931: Maurice Van Ackeren, Forward
- 1932: Conrad Cornie Collin, Forward
- 1932: Arthur Kiely, Guard
- 1932: Willard Schmidt, Center
- 1933: Conrad Cornie Collin, Forward
- 1933: Arthur Kiely, Guard
- 1933: Willard Schmidt, Center
- 1934: Emil Engelbretson, Forward
- 1934: Willard Schmidt, Center
- 1935: George Busch
- 1935: Emil Engelbretson, Forward
- 1936: Emil Engelbretson, Forward
- 1937: Dick Shaw, Forward
- 1938: Dick Shaw, Forward
- 1939: Roman Roh, Center
- 1941: Ed Beisser, Center
- 1941: Arthur Brownie Jaquay, Forward
- 1942: Ed Beisser, Center
- 1942: Gene Haldeman, Guard
- 1943: Ed Beisser, Center
- 1943: Ward Gibson, Guard
- 1943: Ralph Langer, Forward
- 1947: Ward Gibson, Guard
- 1948: Don Knowles, Forward
- 1978: Rick Apke, Forward
- 1981: George Morrow, Forward
- 1984: Benoit Benjamin, Center
- 1985: Benoit Benjamin, Center
- 1985: Vernon Moore, Guard
- 1988: Rod Mason, Guard
- 1989: James Farr, Guard
- 1989: Bob Harstad, Forward
- 1990: Chad Gallagher, Center
- 1990: Bob Harstad, Forward
- 1991: Chad Gallagher, Center
- 1991: Bob Harstad, Forward
- 1992: Duan Cole, Guard
- 1997: Rodney Buford, Guard
- 1998: Rodney Buford, Guard
- 1999: Rodney Buford, Guard
- 2001: Ryan Sears, Guard
- 2002: Kyle Korver, Forward
- 2003: Kyle Korver, Forward
- 2004: Brody Deren, Forward
- 2005: Nate Funk, Guard
- 2007: Nate Funk, Guard
- 2007: Anthony Tolliver, Center
- 2009: Booker Woodfox, Guard
- 2011: Doug McDermott, Forward
- 2012: Doug McDermott, Forward
- 2013: Doug McDermott, Forward

==== Missouri Valley Second Team ====
- 1929: Lou Trautman, Guard
- 1932: Maurice Van Ackeren, Forward
- 1936: Don McIver, Guard
- 1937: Don McIver, Guard
- 1937: Roman Roh, Center
- 1940: Vinson Roach, Guard
- 1941: Gene Haldeman, Guard
- 1942: Dick Nolan, Guard
- 1942: Ralph Langer, Center
- 1943: Gene Lalley, Guard
- 1947: Don Knowles, Forward
- 1979: John C. Johnson, Guard
- 1980: Kevin McKenna, Guard
- 1981: Kevin McKenna, Guard
- 1982: Daryl Stovall, Forward
- 1984: Vernon Moore, Guard
- 1986: Kenny Evans, Forward
- 1987: Kenny Evans, Forward
- 1987: Gary Swain, Forward
- 1989: Chad Gallagher, Center
- 1993: Matt Petty, Guard
- 1994: Nate King, Center
- 1996: Rodney Buford, Guard
- 2000: Ryan Sears, Guard
- 2000: Ben Walker, Guard
- 2001: Kyle Korver, Forward
- 2001: Ben Walker, Guard
- 2002: Brody Deren, Forward
- 2006: Johnny Mathies, Guard
- 2006: Anthony Tolliver, Center
- 2009: P'Allen Stinnett, Guard
- 2010: Kenny Lawson Jr., Center
- 2011: Antoine Young, Guard
- 2012: Antoine Young, Guard

=== Retired numbers ===
Creighton has retired five jersey numbers.

Creighton Bluejays retired numbers
No.	Player	Pos.	Career
3	Doug McDermott	SF / PF	2010-2014
25	Kyle Korver	SG / SF	1999–2003
30	Bob Harstad	PF	1987–1991
33	Bob Portman (Note: For the 2022-23 season the number was issued to incoming freshman Fredrick King, who requested permission to wear it. Portman gave his consent to see the number on the court again.)	SF / SG	1966–1969
35	Paul Silas	PF / SF	1961–1964
45	Bob Gibson	F	1954–1957

=== Bluejays in the NBA ===
Creighton has produced 19 NBA players, including 16 who were drafted.

Year	Round	Pick	Overall	Name	Team	Current team
2026	N/A	N/A	N/A	Josh Dix	N/A	Oklahoma City Thunder
2025	2	34	34	Ryan Kalkbrenner	Charlotte Hornets	Charlotte Hornets
2024	N/A	N/A	N/A	Trey Alexander	N/A	Utah Jazz
2024	1	30	30	Baylor Scheierman	Boston Celtics	Boston Celtics
2020	N/A	N/A	N/A	Ty-Shon Alexander	N/A	
2018	2	8	38	Khyri Thomas	Philadelphia 76ers	
2017	1	16	16	Justin Patton	Chicago Bulls	
2014	1	11	11	Doug McDermott	Denver Nuggets	Sacramento Kings
2007	N/A	N/A	N/A	Anthony Tolliver	N/A	
2003	2	22	51	Kyle Korver	New Jersey Nets	
1999	2	24	53	Rodney Buford	Miami Heat	
1991	2	5	32	Chad Gallagher	Phoenix Suns	
1985	1	3	3	Benoit Benjamin	Los Angeles Clippers	
1985	4	5	75	Alex Stivrins	Seattle SuperSonics	
1981	4	19	88	Kevin McKenna	Los Angeles Lakers	
1969	1	7	7	Bob Portman	San Francisco Warriors	
1969	2	10	25	Wally Anderzunas	Atlanta Hawks	
1966	2	5	15	Neil Johnson	Baltimore Bullets	
1964	12	4	90	Elton McGriff	St. Louis Hawks	
1964	2	3	10	Paul Silas	St. Louis Hawks	
1948	N/A	N/A	N/A	Hoot Gibson	N/A	
Active players

=== Bluejays in the NBA G-League ===
Year	Player	Pos.	Team	NBA Affiliate
2025	Steven Ashworth	PG	Noblesville Boom	Indiana Pacers

=== Bluejays overseas ===
Numerous former Creighton players are currently playing professionally overseas.

Year	Player	Pos.	Team	Country
2025	Jamiya Neal	SF	FMP Beograd	(Serbia)
2022	Alex O'Connell	SG	Alba Berlin	(Germany)
2022	Ryan Hawkins	PF	Skyliners Frankfurt	(Germany)
2021	Damien Jefferson	SF	Bandırma Bordo Basketbol	(Turkey)
2020	Ty-Shon Alexander	SG	Paisas	(Colombia)
2019	Justin Patton	C	Antonine	(Lebanon)
2019	Martin Krampelj	PF	Bilbao Basket	(Spain)
2018	Khyri Thomas	SG	Petkim Spor	(Turkey)
2018	Marcus Foster	SG	PAOK Thessaloniki	(Greece)
2017	Maurice Watson	PG	Al Markaziyya Jounieh	(Lebanon)
2014	Will Artino	C	Taoyuan Pauian Pilots	(Taiwan)
2013	Gregory Echenique	PF	Kumamoto Volters	(Japan)

==== All-time players overseas ====
- Justin Carter (born 1987), former international player
- Devin Brooks (born 1992), former G-League and international player
- Geoffrey Groselle (born 1993), former international player
- Ronnie Harrell (born 1996), basketball player for Hapoel Gilboa Galil of the Israeli Basketball Premier League
- Marcus Zegarowski (born 1998), former G-League and international player

== Records ==
Active players in italics.

=== Career scoring leaders ===
Name	Points
Doug McDermott	3,150
Ryan Kalkbrenner	2,443
Rodney Buford	2,116
Bob Harstad	2,110
Chad Gallagher	1,983
Bob Portman	1,876
Kyle Korver	1,801
Nate Funk	1,754
Rick Apke	1,682
Paul Silas	1,661
Vernon Moore	1,654

=== Career rebound leaders ===
Name	Rebounds
Paul Silas	1,751
Ryan Kalkbrenner	1,146
Bob Harstad	1,126
Doug McDermott	1,088
Benoit Benjamin	1,005
Bob Portman	979
Chad Gallagher	891
Kenny Lawson Jr.	762
Rodney Buford	716
Rick Apke	709
Wally Anderzunas	696

=== Career assist leaders ===
Name	Assists
Ryan Sears	570
Ralph Bobik	549
Antoine Young	505
Grant Gibbs	498
Austin Chatman	493
Randy Eccker	458
Tyler McKinney	430
Vernon Moore	418
Josh Dotzler	388
Duan Cole	382

=== Career blocked shots leaders ===
Name	Blocks
Benoit Benjamin	411
Ryan Kalkbrenner	399
Chad Gallagher	183
Gregory Echenique	171
Kenny Lawson Jr.	153
Brody Deren	138
Anthony Tolliver	136
Doug Swenson	109
Joe Dabbert	104
Adam Reid	79
Livan Pyfrom	76

=== Career steals leaders ===
Name	Steals
Ryan Sears	283
Josh Dotzler	196
Rodney Buford	195
Duan Cole	186
Kyle Korver	172
Johnny Mathies	157
Latrell Wrightsell	154
Vernon Moore	150
Ben Walker	148
Reggie Morris	129

=== Career three-point leaders ===
Name	Three-pointers
Kyle Korver	371
Ethan Wragge	334
Mitchell Ballock	302
Doug McDermott	274
Ryan Sears	245
Rodney Buford	212
Jahenns Manigat	206
Nate Funk	200
Matt Roggenburk	185
Duan Cole	177

=== Career free throw leaders ===
Name	Free throws
Doug McDermott	594
Bob Harstad	588
Elton Tuttle	525
Bob Gibson	418
Ryan Kalkbrenner	391
Bob Portman	382
Paul Silas	375
Antoine Young	362
Vernon Moore	356
Benoit Benjamin	355
Dick Harvey	350

== Rivalries ==
=== Nebraska ===
The Bluejays maintain an intrastate rivalry with the Nebraska Cornhuskers, which has comprised 55 games and has been played each season since 1977. Creighton leads the all-time series 30–28.

=== Marquette ===
The rivalry between Creighton and Marquette is a competitive mid-west basketball rivalry. The teams met 42 times between 1950 and 1988, but the series was discontinued once Marquette dropped its independent status and joined the Midwestern Collegiate Conference in 1988. The rivalry was renewed when Creighton joined the newly reformed Big East conference in 2013 (Marquette joined the Big East in 2005).

Since 1923, Marquette has led the series 60–40.

== Trivia ==
- Creighton is the only NCAA Division-I men's basketball team with a Bluejay as its mascot.
- From 1961 to 2003, the Creighton men's basketball team played their home games at the Omaha Civic Auditorium. The "Civic" was the home of the Creighton women's basketball and volleyball teams until 2009, when they moved into the D.J. Sokol Arena at the Ryan Center in 2009. The building is located across Interstate 480 from Morrison Stadium in downtown Omaha.
- Benoit Benjamin and Baylor Scheierman are the only two players in team history to have recorded a triple-double in a single game. Benjamin recorded three triple-doubles during his college basketball career.
- Baseball Hall of Famer Bob Gibson finished his Creighton basketball career in 1957 as the school's third-best scorer (1,272 points) and second on the CU list for free throws made in a career (418). He averaged 20.2 ppg in his three-year college career. As of the 2014–15 season, Gibson remains 21st on the career scoring list and fourth in both career scoring average and free throws made.
- On December 16, 1967, Bob Portman set the Creighton individual single-game scoring record with 51 points against Wisconsin-Milwaukee.
