= Rodney Buford =

American basketball player (born 1977)

Personal information
- Born: November 2, 1977 (age 49) Milwaukee, Wisconsin, U.S.
- Listed height: 6 ft 5 in (1.96 m)
- Listed weight: 190 lb (86 kg)

Career information
- High school: Vincent (Milwaukee, Wisconsin)
- College: Creighton (1995–1999)
- NBA draft: 1999: 2nd round, 53rd overall pick
- Drafted by: Miami Heat
- Playing career: 1999–2013
- Position: Shooting guard / small forward
- Number: 32, 23, 2

Career history
- 1999–2000: Miami Heat
- 2000: Basket Rimini
- 2000–2001: Philadelphia 76ers
- 2001–2002: Memphis Grizzlies
- 2002–2003: Panathinaikos
- 2003: Sacramento Kings
- 2003–2004: Pallacanestro Virtus Roma
- 2004: Dakota Wizards
- 2004: Sacramento Kings
- 2004–2005: New Jersey Nets
- 2005–2006: Sioux Falls Skyforce
- 2006: Azovmash Mariupol
- 2006: Maccabi Tel Aviv
- 2007–2008: Azovmash Mariupol
- 2009: Sporting Al Riyadi Beirut
- 2009: Eisbären Bremerhaven
- 2010: Fukien
- 2010–2011: Proteas EKA AEL
- 2011: Toros de Aragua
- 2011: Fukien
- 2011: Halifax Rainmen
- 2011–2013: London Lightning
- Stats at NBA.com
- Stats at Basketball Reference

Rodney Alan "The Sheriff" Buford (born November 2, 1977) is an American former professional basketball player who last played for the London Lightning of the National Basketball League of Canada. He played college basketball for the Creighton Bluejays.

Buford played collegiately for Creighton University and was selected by the NBA's Miami Heat in the second round (53rd overall) of the 1999 NBA draft. After seeing limited playing time during his rookie season with the Heat, Buford moved to Italy starting the season with Basket Rimini, but joined the Philadelphia 76ers in December for the 2000–01 season. He then moved on to the Memphis Grizzlies, the Sacramento Kings, and finally the New Jersey Nets. Buford averaged 6.4 points per game in his NBA career.

Buford played overseas for the Greek European giant Panathinaikos BC during the 2002–03 season. He started the 2006–07 season in the Euroleague with the Maccabi Tel Aviv basketball club from Israel, but he was released in December due to discipline violations and poor form. After a few months, it was discovered that he had failed a drug test during his time in Maccabi Tel Aviv, his third violation in his career. He recently played for the Ukrainian team Azovmash Mariupol, a team for which he played the 2005–06 season, after being banned by FIBA for testing positive in use of cannabis before a Euroleague game while still playing for Maccabi Tel Aviv. Consequently, he left the team in February 2007 after playing just one game. In March 2009 he played two games in Lebanon for Al Riyadi.

At the start of the 2009–10 season, he moved to Eisbären Bremerhaven of Germany's highest division Basketball Bundesliga. On 24 December 2009, Buford traveled to the U.S. to attend to family business. He agreed to return in early January, but was not on the plane with which he was scheduled to arrive. All attempts by the team to contact him were unsuccessful and his contract was dissolved on 11 January 2010.

On September 19, 2011, it was announced that Buford had signed a deal with the Halifax Rainmen of the National Basketball League of Canada to play for the 2011–12 season. However, on November 14, the Rainmen traded him to the London Lightning for Tyrone Levett.
