= Benoit Benjamin =

American basketball player (born 1964)

Personal information
- Born: November 22, 1964 (age 61) Monroe, Louisiana, U.S.
- Listed height: 7 ft 0 in (2.13 m)
- Listed weight: 250 lb (113 kg)

Career information
- High school: Carroll (Monroe, Louisiana)
- College: Creighton (1982–1985)
- NBA draft: 1985: 1st round, 3rd overall pick
- Drafted by: Los Angeles Clippers
- Playing career: 1985–2001
- Position: Center
- Number: 00, 7

Career history
- 1985–1991: Los Angeles Clippers
- 1991–1993: Seattle SuperSonics
- 1993: Los Angeles Lakers
- 1993–1995: New Jersey Nets
- 1995: Vancouver Grizzlies
- 1995–1996: Milwaukee Bucks
- 1996: Toronto Raptors
- 1997: Yakima Sun Kings
- 1997–1998: Peristeri Athens
- 1998: Philadelphia 76ers
- 1998: Grand Rapids Hoops
- 1998: Criollos de Caguas
- 1999: Philadelphia 76ers
- 1999: Cleveland Cavaliers
- 1999: Atenas de Córdoba
- 1999: Criollos de Caguas
- 2000: Detroit Dogs
- 2000–2001: Al Riyadi Beirut

Career highlights
- Third-team All-American – NABC (1985); First-team Parade All-American (1982); McDonald's All-American (1982)

Career NBA statistics
- Points: 9,223 (11.4 ppg)
- Rebounds: 6,063 (7.5 rpg)
- Assists: 1,070 (1.3 apg)
- Stats at NBA.com
- Stats at Basketball Reference

Lenard Benoit Benjamin [be-NOYT] (/bəˈnɔɪt/; born November 22, 1964) is an American former professional basketball player who was selected by the Los Angeles Clippers in the 1st round (3rd overall) of the 1985 NBA draft. A 7'0" center from Creighton University, Benjamin played for nine NBA teams in 15 seasons from 1985 to 1999. He played for the Clippers (1985–91), Seattle SuperSonics (1991–93), Los Angeles Lakers (1993, 1999 preseason), New Jersey Nets (1993–95), Vancouver Grizzlies (1995), Milwaukee Bucks (1995–96), Toronto Raptors (1996), Philadelphia 76ers (1998–99) and Cleveland Cavaliers (1999). Benjamin's daughter is Khaalia Hillsman who played at Texas A&M.

== Career ==
Benjamin's best year as a professional came during the 1988–89 NBA season as a member of the Clippers, appearing in 79 games and averaging 16.4 ppg. It was also during this season that some criticized Benjamin's on-court actions, as famously exemplified by television announcer Dick Vitale after a January 1988 game against the Milwaukee Bucks: “He has a double zero on his back, but he should add another zero. I give him a zero for his offensive attitude, a zero for his defensive attitude, and a zero for his mental attitude ... he’s an absolute, flat-out disgrace to everyone that’s ever worn a basketball uniform.”

In his NBA career, he had a .541 field goal percentage, recorded 4,604 defensive rebounds and 1,581 blocks and averaged 11.4 points and 2.0 blocks per game. Benjamin also played briefly in the Continental Basketball Association (CBA) in the latter part of his career. In 8 games over two seasons with the Yakima Sun Kings and Grand Rapids Hoops, he averaged 10.9 points and 8.8 rebounds per contest.

He is the Clippers' career leader in blocked shots per game (2.75).

== NBA career statistics ==
Legend
| GP | Games played | GS | Games started | MPG | Minutes per game |
| FG% | Field goal percentage | 3P% | 3-point field goal percentage | FT% | Free throw percentage |
| RPG | Rebounds per game | APG | Assists per game | SPG | Steals per game |
| BPG | Blocks per game | PPG | Points per game | **Bold** | Career high |
| * | Led the league |

=== Regular season ===
| Year | Team | GP | GS | MPG | FG% | 3P% | FT% | RPG | APG | SPG | BPG | PPG |
|---|---|---|---|---|---|---|---|---|---|---|---|---|
| 1985–86 | L.A. Clippers | 79 | 37 | 26.4 | .490 | **.333** | .746 | 7.6 | 1.0 | **0.8** | 2.6 | 11.1 |
| 1986–87 | L.A. Clippers | 72 | 61 | 31.0 | .449 | .000 | .715 | 8.1 | 1.9 | **0.8** | 2.6 | 11.5 |
| 1987–88 | L.A. Clippers | 66 | 59 | **32.9** | .491 | .000 | .706 | 8.0 | **2.6** | **0.8** | **3.4** | 13.0 |
| 1988–89 | L.A. Clippers | 79 | 62 | 32.7 | **.541** | .000 | .744 | 8.8 | 2.0 | 0.7 | 2.8 | **16.4** |
| 1989–90 | L.A. Clippers | 71 | 58 | 32.6 | .526 | .000 | .732 | 9.3 | 2.2 | **0.8** | 2.6 | 13.5 |
| 1990–91 | L.A. Clippers | 39 | 38 | 34.3 | .492 | .000 | .728 | **12.0** | 1.9 | 0.7 | 2.3 | 14.9 |
| 1990–91 | Seattle | 31 | 27 | 29.0 | .502 | .000 | .690 | 8.2 | 1.5 | 0.9 | 1.7 | 12.9 |
| 1991–92 | Seattle | 63 | 61 | 30.8 | .478 | .000 | .687 | 8.1 | 1.2 | 0.6 | 1.9 | 14.0 |
| 1992–93 | Seattle | 31 | 6 | 14.5 | .497 | .000 | .701 | 3.6 | 0.4 | 0.5 | 1.1 | 6.7 |
| 1992–93 | L.A. Lakers | 28 | 0 | 10.9 | .481 | .000 | .595 | 3.4 | 0.4 | 0.5 | 0.5 | 4.5 |
| 1993–94 | New Jersey | 77 | **74** | 23.6 | .480 | .000 | .710 | 6.5 | 0.6 | 0.5 | 1.2 | 9.3 |
| 1994–95 | New Jersey | 61 | 57 | 26.2 | .510 | .000 | **.760** | 7.2 | 0.6 | 0.4 | 1.0 | 11.1 |
| 1995–96 | Vancouver | **13*** | 13 | 31.1 | .441 | .000 | .696 | 7.9 | 1.2 | 0.8 | 1.2 | 13.9 |
| 1995–96 | Milwaukee | **70*** | 58 | 21.3 | .520 | .000 | .732 | 6.2 | 0.7 | 0.5 | 1.0 | 7.8 |
| 1996–97 | Toronto | 4 | 3 | 11.0 | .417 | .000 | .750 | 2.3 | 0.3 | 0.3 | 0.0 | 3.3 |
| 1997–98 | Philadelphia | 14 | 0 | 14.1 | .537 | .000 | .633 | 3.8 | 0.2 | 0.3 | 0.3 | 4.5 |
| 1998–99 | Philadelphia | 6 | 0 | 5.5 | .286 | .000 | .000 | 1.3 | 0.2 | 0.0 | 0.0 | 0.7 |
| 1999–00 | Cleveland | 3 | 0 | 2.7 | .333 | .000 | .000 | 0.3 | 0.0 | 0.0 | 0.3 | 0.7 |
| Career | | 807 | 614 | 27.2 | .497 | .048 | .721 | 7.5 | 1.3 | 0.6 | 2.0 | 11.4 |

=== Playoffs ===
| Year | Team | GP | GS | MPG | FG% | 3P% | FT% | RPG | APG | SPG | BPG | PPG |
|---|---|---|---|---|---|---|---|---|---|---|---|---|
| 1990–91 | Seattle | 5 | **5** | **32.6** | .488 | .000 | **.906** | **6.6** | 0.2 | 0.6 | **2.6** | **13.8** |
| 1991–92 | Seattle | **9** | 4 | 17.9 | **.561** | .000 | .500 | 5.1 | 0.6 | **0.6** | 1.4 | 6.1 |
| 1993–94 | New Jersey | 4 | 4 | 27.0 | .412 | .000 | .875 | 5.3 | 0.3 | 0.5 | 2.0 | 5.3 |
| Career | | 18 | 13 | 24.0 | .505 | .000 | .776 | 5.6 | 0.4 | 0.6 | 1.9 | 8.1 |

== See also ==
- List of National Basketball Association career blocks leaders
- List of National Basketball Association players with 10 or more blocks in a game
