= Southern Illinois Salukis men's basketball statistical leaders =

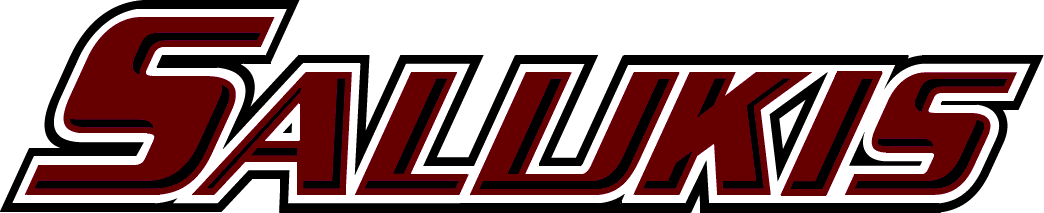

The Southern Illinois Salukis men's basketball statistical leaders are individual statistical leaders of the Southern Illinois Salukis men's basketball program in various categories, including points, assists, blocks, rebounds, and steals. Within those areas, the lists identify single-game, single-season, and career leaders. The Salukis represent Southern Illinois University Carbondale in the NCAA's Missouri Valley Conference.

Southern Illinois began competing in intercollegiate basketball in 1913. However, the school's record book does not generally list records from before the 1950s, as records from before this period are often incomplete and inconsistent. Since scoring was much lower in this era, and teams played much fewer games during a typical season, it is likely that few or no players from this era would appear on these lists anyway.

The NCAA did not officially record assists as a stat until the 1983–84 season, and blocks and steals until the 1985–86 season, but Southern Illinois's record books includes players in these stats before these seasons. These lists are updated through the end of the 2020–21 season.

== Scoring ==
Career
Rk	Player	Points	Seasons
1	Charlie Vaughn	2,088	1958–59 1959–60 1960–61 1961–62
2	Kent Williams	2,012	1999–00 2000–01 2001–02 2002–03
3	Anthony Beane	1,917	2012–13 2013–14 2014–15 2015–16
4	Mike Glenn	1,878	1973–74 1974–75 1975–76 1976–77
5	Ashraf Amaya	1,864	1989–90 1990–91 1991–92 1992–93
6	Darren Brooks	1,761	2000–01 2001–02 2002–03 2003–04 2004–05
7	Steve Middleton	1,710	1984–85 1985–86 1986–87 1987–88
8	Jamaal Tatum	1,667	2003–04 2004–05 2005–06 2006–07
9	Marcus Domask	1,615	2019–20 2020–21 2021–22 2022–23
10	Joe Meriweather	1,536	1972–73 1973–74 1974–75

Season
Rk	Player	Points	Season
1	Charlie Vaughn	779	1959–60
2	Steve Middleton	711	1987–88
3	Xavier Johnson	709	2023–24
4	Chris Carr	705	1994–95
5	Troy Hudson	631	1996–97
6	Charlie Vaughn	620	1958–59
7	Greg Starrick	618	1971–72
8	Anthony Beane	617	2015–16
9	Desmar Jackson	613	2013–14
10	Mike Glenn	609	1976–77

Single game
Rk	Player	Points	Season	Opponent
1	Dick Garrett	46	1967–68	Centenary
2	Charlie Vaughn	43	1959–60	Tennessee State
3	Steve Middleton	42	1987–88	Bradley
4	Seymour Bryson	40	1958–59	Rockhurst
	L.C. Brasfield	40	1970–71	Winston-Salem
	Mike Glenn	40	1976–77	Wichita State
7	Charlie Vaughn	39	1959–60	North Central
	Steve Middleton	39	1987–88	Wisconsin
	Ashraf Amaya	39	1992–93	Northern Illinois
	Troy Hudson	39	1995–96	Indiana State

== Rebounds ==
Career
Rk	Player	Rebounds	Seasons
1	Seymour Bryson	1,244	1955–56 1956–57 1957–58 1958–59
2	Ashraf Amaya	1,132	1989–90 1990–91 1991–92 1992–93
3	Joe Meriweather	1,005	1972–73 1973–74 1974–75
4	Marcus Timmons	999	1991–92 1992–93 1993–94 1994–95
5	Rick Shipley	983	1987–88 1988–89 1989–90 1990–91
6	Randal Falker	905	2004–05 2005–06 2006–07 2007–08
7	Gary Wilson	841	1975–76 1976–77 1977–78 1978–79
8	Sean O’Brien	805	2013–14 2014–15 2015–16 2016–17
9	Jermaine Dearman	802	1999–00 2000–01 2001–02 2002–03
10	Matt Shaw	741	2004–05 2005–06 2006–07 2007–08

Season
Rk	Player	Rebounds	Season
1	Joe Meriweather	387	1973–74
2	Ashraf Amaya	349	1992–93
3	Jerry Jones	341	1989–90
4	Ed Spila	334	1961–62
5	Seymour Bryson	333	1956–57
6	Seymour Bryson	318	1957–58
7	Joe Meriweather	311	1974–75
8	Walt Frazier	310	1966–67
9	Ashraf Amaya	308	1991–92
10	Joe Meriweather	307	1972–73

Single game
Rk	Player	Rebounds	Season	Opponent
1	Joe Meriweather	27	1973–74	Indiana State
2	Joe Meriweather	23	1972–73	Mercer
3	Seymour Bryson	22	1956–57	Illinois State
	Boyd O’Neal	22	1965–66	Evansville
5	Seymour Bryson	21	1957–58	Illinois Wesleyan
	Marvin Jones	21	1957–58	Illinois Wesleyan
	Boyd O’Neal	21	1964–65	San Francisco State
	Boyd O’Neal	21	1965–66	Evansville
	Walt Frazier	21	1966–67	Saint Louis
	Nate Hawthorne	21	1970–71	Arkansas

== Assists ==
Career
Rk	Player	Assists	Seasons
1	Bryan Mullins	509	2005–06 2006–07 2007–08 2008–09
2	Wayne Abrams	465	1976–77 1977–78 1978–79 1979–80
3	Shane Hawkins	435	1994–95 1995–96 1996–97 1997–98
4	Darren Brooks	410	2000–01 2001–02 2002–03 2003–04 2004–05
5	Chris Lowery	389	1990–91 1991–92 1992–93 1993–94
6	Sterling Mahan	381	1987–88 1988–89 1989–90 1990–91
7	Kai Nurnberger	371	1984–85 1986–87 1987–88 1988–89
8	Marcus Domask	356	2019–20 2020–21 2021–22 2022–23
9	Kent Williams	352	1999–00 2000–01 2001–02 2002–03
10	Marcus Timmons	343	1991–92 1992–93 1993–94 1994–95

Season
Rk	Player	Assists	Season
1	Xavier Johnson	196	2023–24
2	Bryan Mullins	154	2007–08
3	Darren Brooks	150	2004–05
4	Kevin Dillard	146	2009–10
5	Wayne Abrams	144	1978–79
	Sterling Mahan	144	1989–90
7	Kai Nurnberger	132	1988–89
	Mike Rodriguez	132	2016–17
9	Tyrone Bell	131	1992–93
	Shane Hawkins	131	1996–97

Single game
Rk	Player	Assists	Season	Opponent
1	Rob Kirsner	13	1980–81	Wichita State
	Bryan Mullins	13	2008–09	Massachusetts
3	Shane Hawkins	12	1995–96	Hawaii Hilo
	Shane Hawkins	12	1995–96	Drake
	Kevin Dillard	12	2009–10	Bradley
6	Wayne Abrams	11	1978–79	New Mexico State
	Bernard Campbell	11	1983–84	Wisconsin
	Wayne Abrams	11	1977–78	West Texas A&M
9	Wayne Abrams	10	1976–77	Pittsburgh
	Wayne Abrams	10	1978–79	Indiana State
	Wayne Abrams	10	1978–79	Milwaukee
	Kai Nurnberger	10	1988–89	South Carolina State
	Rick Shipley	10	1989–90	Air Force
	Shane Hawkins	10	1996–97	Indiana State
	Rashad Tucker	10	1997–98	Northern Iowa
	Bryan Mullins	10	2008–09	Missouri State
	Kevin Dillard	10	2009–10	Indianapolis
	Kevin Dillard	10	2009–10	SEMO
	Kevin Dillard	10	2009–10	Western Kentucky
	Mike Rodriguez	10	2016–17	Texas Southern
	Aaron Cook	10	2018–19	Howard

== Steals ==
Career
Rk	Player	Steals	Seasons
1	Darren Brooks	258	2000–01 2001–02 2002–03 2003–04 2004–05
2	Bryan Mullins	254	2005–06 2006–07 2007–08 2008–09
3	Marcus Timmons	211	1991–92 1992–93 1993–94 1994–95
4	Stetson Hairston	185	2001–02 2002–03 2003–04 2004–05
5	Lance Jones	176	2019–20 2020–21 2021–22 2022–23
6	Sterling Mahan	171	1987–88 1988–89 1989–90 1990–91
	Tony Young	171	2002–03 2003–04 2004–05 2005–06 2006–07
8	Chris Lowery	169	1990–91 1991–92 1992–93 1993–94
9	Jamaal Tatum	159	2003–04 2004–05 2005–06 2006–07
10	Anthony Beane	145	2012–13 2013–14 2014–15 2015–16

Season
Rk	Player	Steals	Season
1	Bryan Mullins	94	2005–06
2	Darren Brooks	92	2004–05
3	Desmar Jackson	80	2013–14
4	Marcus Timmons	70	1994–95
5	Bryan Mullins	66	2007–08
6	Darren Brooks	62	2002–03
7	Darren Brooks	60	2003–04
	Wayne Abrams	60	1979–80
9	Sterling Mahan	59	1990–91
10	Chris Lowery	58	1993–94
	Desmar Jackson	58	2012–13

Single game
Rk	Player	Steals	Season	Opponent
1	Marcus Timmons	8	1994–95	Creighton
	Darren Brooks	8	2003–04	Drake
	Darren Brooks	8	2004–05	Missouri State
	Bryan Mullins	8	2005–06	Creighton
5	Darren Brooks	7	2004–05	Augustana
	Kennard Davis	7	2024–25	Missouri S&T
	Quel'Ron House	7	2025–26	Drake
8	Wayne Abrams	6	1979–80	UW-Milwaukee
	Rick Shipley	6	1987–88	Bradley
	Marcus Timmons	6	1992–93	NE Missouri
	Chris Lowery	6	1993–94	Tulsa
	Troy Hudson	6	1995–96	Hawaii Hilo
	Stetson Hairston	6	2002–03	Cal-St. Northridge
	Darren Brooks	6	2002–03	Wichita State
	Darren Brooks	6	2003–04	Montana
	Tony Young	6	2003–04	Hawaii
	Tony Young	6	2004–05	Murray State
	Bryan Mullins	6	2005–06	Evansville
	Bryan Mullins	6	2005–06	Drake
	Bryan Mullins	6	2007–08	Mississippi State
	Desmar Jackson	6	2013–14	Drake
	Desmar Jackson	6	2013–14	Loyola
	Desmar Jackson	6	2013–14	Drake
	Desmar Jackson	6	2013–14	Northern Iowa
	Lance Jones	6	2022–23	Evansville
	Xavier Johnson	6	2022–23	Saint Louis

== Blocks ==
Career
Rk	Player	Blocks	Seasons
1	Randal Falker	195	2004–05 2005–06 2006–07 2007–08
2	Joe Meriweather	164	1972–73 1973–74 1974–75
3	Ashraf Amaya	157	1989–90 1990–91 1991–92 1992–93
4	Marcus Timmons	123	1991–92 1992–93 1993–94 1994–95
5	Kavion Pippen	108	2017–18 2018–19
6	Thik Bol	107	2016–17 2018–19
	Rod Camp	107	1980–81 1981–82
8	Gary Wilson	99	1975–76 1976–77 1977–78 1978–79
9	Rolan Roberts	87	2001–02
10	Marcelo Da Silva	82	1990–91 1991–92 1992–93 1993–94

Season
Rk	Player	Blocks	Season
1	Joe Meriweather	90	1973–74
2	Rolan Roberts	87	2001–02
3	Thik Bol	76	2016–17
4	Randal Falker	75	2006–07
5	Joe Meriweather	74	1974–75
6	Tony Harvey	70	1988–89
7	Rod Camp	69	1980–81
8	Kavion Pippen	63	2018–19
9	Ashraf Amaya	58	1990–91
10	Randal Falker	47	2005–06
	Ashraf Amaya	47	1992–93

Single game
Rk	Player	Blocks	Season	Opponent
1	Rod Camp	8	1980–81	Siena
2	Rolan Roberts	7	2001–02	Indiana State
	Rolan Roberts	7	2001–02	Indiana
	Tony Harvey	7	1988–89	Bradley
	Thik Bol	7	2016–17	Loyola
6	Rod Camp	6	1980–81	Loyola
	Ashraf Amaya	6	1990–91	Missouri State
	Rolan Roberts	6	2001–02	SEMO
	Thik Bol	6	2016–17	Mount Saint Mary's
	Thik Bol	6	2016–17	Evansville
