= 1993 Missouri Valley Conference men's basketball tournament =

- Classification: Division I
- Season: 1992–93
- Teams: 8
- Site: St. Louis Arena; St. Louis, Missouri
- Champions: Southern Illinois (2nd title)
- Winning coach: Rich Herrin (1st title)
- MVP: Ashraf Amaya (Southern Illinois)

1992–93 Missouri Valley Conference men's basketball standings
	Conf.				Overall
Team	W		L	PCT	W		L	PCT
Illinois State	13	–	5	.722	19	–	10	.655
Southern Illinois †	12	–	6	.667	23	–	10	.697
Southwest Missouri State	11	–	7	.611	20	–	11	.645
Tulsa	10	–	8	.556	15	–	14	.517
Drake	9	–	9	.500	14	–	14	.500
Northern Iowa	8	–	10	.444	12	–	15	.444
Wichita State	7	–	11	.389	10	–	17	.370
Bradley	7	–	11	.389	11	–	16	.407
Indiana State	7	–	11	.389	11	–	17	.393
Creighton	6	–	12	.333	8	–	18	.308
† 1993 MVC tournament winner Rankings from AP Poll

The 1993 Missouri Valley Conference men's basketball tournament was played after the conclusion of the 1992–1993 regular season at the St. Louis Arena in St. Louis, Missouri.

The Southern Illinois Salukis defeated the Illinois State Redbirds in the championship game, 70-59, and as result won their 2nd MVC Tournament title and earned an automatic bid to the 1993 NCAA tournament. Ashraf Amaya of Southern Illinois was named the tournament MVP.

== Bracket ==
Quarterfinals; March 6, 1993
1	Illinois State	73
8	Indiana State	68
4	Drake	63
5	Northern Iowa	59
2	Southern Illinois	63
7	Bradley	61^{OT}
3	Southwest Missouri State	72
6	Wichita State	57

Semifinals; March 7, 1993
1	Illinois State	60
4	Drake	59
2	Southern Illinois	76
3	Southwest Missouri State	68

Final; March 8, 1993
1	Illinois State	59
2	Southern Illinois	70
