= 1994 Missouri Valley Conference men's basketball tournament =

- Classification: Division I
- Season: 1993–94
- Teams: 8
- Site: St. Louis Arena; St. Louis, Missouri
- Champions: Southern Illinois (3rd title)
- Winning coach: Rich Herrin (2nd title)
- MVP: Cam Johnson (Northern Iowa)

1993–94 Missouri Valley Conference men's basketball standings
	Conf.				Overall
Team	W		L	PCT	W		L	PCT
Tulsa	15	–	3	.833	23	–	8	.742
Bradley	14	–	4	.778	23	–	8	.742
Southern Illinois †	14	–	4	.778	23	–	7	.767
Illinois State	12	–	6	.667	16	–	11	.593
Northern Iowa	10	–	8	.556	16	–	13	.552
Southwest Missouri State	7	–	11	.389	12	–	15	.444
Wichita State	6	–	12	.333	9	–	18	.333
Drake	6	–	12	.333	11	–	16	.407
Creighton	3	–	15	.167	7	–	22	.241
Indiana State	3	–	15	.167	4	–	22	.154
† 1994 MVC tournament winner Rankings from AP Poll

The 1994 Missouri Valley Conference men's basketball tournament was played after the conclusion of the 1993–1994 regular season at the St. Louis Arena in St. Louis, Missouri.

The Southern Illinois Salukis defeated the Northern Iowa Panthers, 77–74, in the championship game and as a result won their 3rd MVC Tournament title and earned an automatic bid to the 1994 NCAA tournament. Cam Johnson of Northern Iowa was named the tournament MVP.

== Bracket ==
Quarterfinals; March 5, 1994
1	Tulsa	91
8	Drake	82
4	Illinois State	70
5	Northern Iowa	84
2	Bradley	52
7	Wichita State	44
3	Southern Illinois	52
6	Southwest Missouri State	50

Semifinals; March 6, 1994
1	Tulsa	73
5	Northern Iowa	79
2	Bradley	59
3	Southern Illinois	72

Final; March 7, 1994
5	Northern Iowa	74
3	Southern Illinois	77
