= 1992–93 Southern Illinois Salukis men's basketball team =

American college basketball season

1992–93 Southern Illinois Salukis men's basketball

MVC tournament champion

NCAA tournament
- Conference: Missouri Valley Conference

Ranking
- Coaches: No. 22
- Record: 23–10 (12–6 MVC)
- Head coach: Rich Herrin (8th season)
- Home arena: SIU Arena

1992–93 Missouri Valley Conference men's basketball standings
	Conf.				Overall
Team	W		L	PCT	W		L	PCT
Illinois State	13	–	5	.722	19	–	10	.655
Southern Illinois †	12	–	6	.667	23	–	10	.697
Southwest Missouri State	11	–	7	.611	20	–	11	.645
Tulsa	10	–	8	.556	15	–	14	.517
Drake	9	–	9	.500	14	–	14	.500
Northern Iowa	8	–	10	.444	12	–	15	.444
Wichita State	7	–	11	.389	10	–	17	.370
Bradley	7	–	11	.389	11	–	16	.407
Indiana State	7	–	11	.389	11	–	17	.393
Creighton	6	–	12	.333	8	–	18	.308
† 1993 MVC tournament winner Rankings from AP Poll

The 1992–93 Southern Illinois Salukis men's basketball team represented Southern Illinois University Carbondale during the 1992–93 NCAA Division I men's basketball season. The Salukis were led by eighth-year head coach Rich Herrin and played their home games at the SIU Arena in Carbondale, Illinois as members of the Missouri Valley Conference. They finished the season 23–10, 12–6 in MVC play to finish in second place. The Salukis won the MVC tournament to receive an automatic bid to the NCAA tournament as No. 14 seed in the Midwest region. The Salukis fell to two-time defending champion and No. 3 seed Duke in the opening round.

== Roster ==
1993–94 Southern Illinois Salukis men's basketball team
Players
Coaches

Pos.	#	Name	Height	Weight	Year	Previous school	Hometown
G		Chris Lowery	—	—	Jr
F		Marcus Timmons	6 ft 8 in (2.03 m)	215 lb (98 kg)	So		Sikeston, Missouri
F	43	Chris Carr	6 ft 6 in (1.98 m)	215 lb (98 kg)	Fr		Ironton, Missouri
F	50	Ashraf Amaya	6 ft 8 in (2.03 m)	225 lb (102 kg)	Sr

Head coach

- Rich Herrin

Assistant coach(es)

Legend

- (C) Team captain
- (S) Suspended
- (I) Ineligible
- (W) Walk-on
- Injured
- Current redshirt

Roster

== Schedule and results ==
Date time, TV	Rank^{#}	Opponent^{#}	Result	Record	Site (attendance) city, state
Non-conference regular season
Dec 10, 1992*		at Eastern Illinois	W 85–72	1–0	Lantz Arena; Charleston, Illinois
Dec 12, 1992*		at Northern Illinois	W 91–62	2–0	Chick Evans Fieldhouse; DeKalb, Illinois
Dec 16, 1992*		Saint Louis	W 57–44	3–0	SIU Arena; Carbondale, Illinois
Dec 20, 1992*		vs. Radford; San Juan Shootout	W 108–82	4–0	San Juan, Puerto Rico
Dec 21, 1992*		vs. Mississippi State; San Juan Shootout	W 76–64	5–0	San Juan, Puerto Rico
Dec 22, 1992*		vs. No. 8 Iowa; San Juan Shootout	L 70–90	5–1	San Juan, Puerto Rico
Dec 28, 1992*		at Ole Miss	W 85–78	6–1	Tad Smith Coliseum; Oxford, Mississippi
Missouri Valley regular season
Jan 2, 1993		Creighton	W 85–64	7–1 (1–0)	SIU Arena; Carbondale, Illinois
Mar 1, 1993		Tulsa	W 106–80	20–9 (12–6)	SIU Arena; Carbondale, Illinois
Missouri Valley tournament
Mar 6, 1993*		vs. Bradley; Quarterfinals	W 63–61 ^{OT}	21–9	St. Louis Arena; St. Louis, Missouri
Mar 7, 1993*		vs. SW Missouri State; Semifinals	W 76–68	21–9	St. Louis Arena; St. Louis, Missouri
Mar 8, 1993*		vs. Illinois State; Championship game	W 70–59	23–9	St. Louis Arena; St. Louis, Missouri
NCAA tournament
Mar 18, 1993*	(14 MW)	vs. (3 MW) No. 10 Duke; First Round	L 70–105	23–10	Rosemont Horizon; Rosemont, Illinois
*Non-conference game. ^{#}Rankings from AP poll. (#) Tournament seedings in parentheses. MW=Midwest. All times are in Central Time.
