= Bob Bender =

American professional basketball coach

Personal information
- Born: April 28, 1957 (age 69) Quantico, Virginia, U.S.
- Listed height: 6 ft 2 in (1.88 m)
- Listed weight: 175 lb (79 kg)

Career information
- High school: Bloomington (Bloomington, Illinois)
- College: Indiana (1975–1976); Duke (1977–1980)
- NBA draft: 1979: 6th round, 119th overall pick
- Drafted by: San Diego Clippers
- Position: Point guard
- Coaching career: 1983–2018

Career history

Coaching
- 1983–1989: Duke (assistant)
- 1989–1993: Illinois State
- 1993–2002: Washington
- 2002–2004: Philadelphia 76ers (assistant)
- 2004–2013: Atlanta Hawks (assistant)
- 2013–2014: Milwaukee Bucks (assistant)
- 2015–2016: Brooklyn Nets (scout)
- 2016–2018: Memphis Grizzlies (assistant)

Career highlights
- As player: NCAA champion (1976); Second-team Parade All-American (1975); As coach: MVC tournament champion (1990); 2x MVC regular season champion (1992, 1993); MVC Coach of the Year (1992); Pac-10 Coach of the Year (1996)
- Stats at Basketball Reference

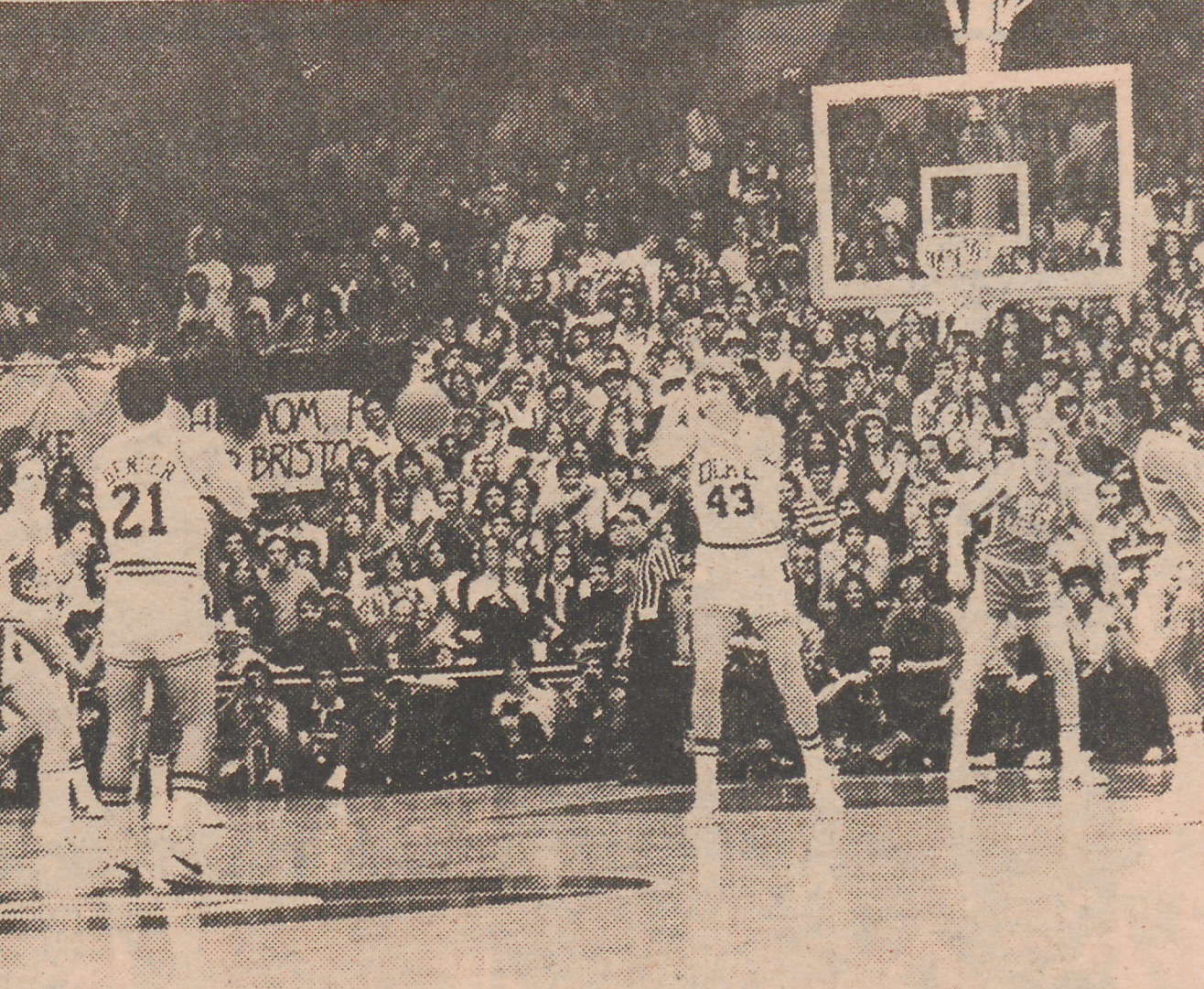
Bob Bender (left, #21) as a player at Duke in 1979

Robert Michael Bender (born April 28, 1957) is an American professional basketball coach, who last served an assistant coach with the Memphis Grizzlies of the National Basketball Association. Born in Quantico, Virginia, He attended Bloomington High School in Bloomington, Illinois, where he was an All-American in basketball. Bender has the distinction of being the first (and until 2025 only) (Note: LJ Cryer briefly played in Baylor's win in the 2021 championship game as a freshman, and started for Houston in its loss to Florida as a fifth-year senior in 2025.) individual to play for different programs in two NCAA Championship games. He was a freshman on Bob Knight's undefeated 1976 Indiana team and played point guard at Duke from 1977 to 1980, including an appearance in the title game against Kentucky. Bender was drafted by the San Diego Clippers in the sixth round before his senior year, but did not play.

He began his coaching career as an assistant at Duke under Mike Krzyzewski. He later served as head coach at Illinois State University and the University of Washington, and was an assistant with the Philadelphia 76ers.

Bender is married to his wife, Alice, with whom he has two children: Mary Elizabeth and Robert Michael Bender III.

On June 17, 2013, Bender was hired as an assistant coach of the Milwaukee Bucks, under Larry Drew, of whom he was an assistant to at the Atlanta Hawks.

== Head coaching record ==
Record table
Season	Team	Overall	Conference	Standing	Postseason
Illinois State Redbirds (Missouri Valley Conference) (1989–1993)
1989–90	Illinois State	18–13	9–5	T–2nd	NCAA Division I First Round
1990–91	Illinois State	5–23	4–12	T–8th	
1991–92	Illinois State	18–11	14–4	T–1st	
1992–93	Illinois State	19–10	13–5	1st	
Illinois State:		60–57 (.513)	40–26 (.606)		
Washington Huskies (Pacific-10 Conference) (1993–2002)
1993–94	Washington	5–22	3–15	9th	
1994–95	Washington	10–17 (Note: At the end of the 1994–95 season, Washington had originally finished 9–18 overall and 5–13 in conference. However, the Huskies' record was adjusted after all of California's wins were vacated.)	6–12	T–7th	
1995–96	Washington	16–12	9–9	T–5th	NIT First Round
1996–97	Washington	17–11	10–8	6th	NIT First Round
1997–98	Washington	20–10	11–7	4th	NCAA Division I Sweet 16
1998–99	Washington	17–12	10–8	4th	NCAA Division I First Round
1999–00	Washington	10–20	5–13	T–8th	
2000–01	Washington	10–20	4–14	T–9th	
2001–02	Washington	11–18	5–13	8th	
Washington:		116–142 (.450)	63–99 (.389)		
Total:		176–199 (.469)			
National champion Postseason invitational champion Conference regular season champion Conference regular season and conference tournament champion Division regular season champion Division regular season and conference tournament champion Conference tournament champion
