= Christian College National Invitational Tournament =

US men's college basketball tournament

The Christian College National Invitational Tournament is an annual men's college basketball post-season tournament. First played in 2012, the tournament is hosted by Oakland City University located in Oakland City, Indiana.

CCNIT Champions
Year	Winner	Runner-up	Result
2012	Oakland City University	Ohio Midwestern College	83-82
2013	Oakland City University	Virginia University of Lynchburg	90-72
2014	Oakland City University	Victory University	71-68
2015	Oakland City University	Ohio Midwestern College	95-76
2016	Morthland College	Toccoa Falls College	86-83
2017	Southwestern Adventist University	Oakland City University	89-78
2018	Wilberforce University	Oakland City University	87-80
2019	Oakland City University	Wilberforce University	105-99
2020	TBD		

== See also ==
- Association of Christian College Athletics
- National Christian College Athletic AssociationTrinity College of Florida
- United States Collegiate Athletic Association
