= 1990 Missouri Valley Conference men's basketball tournament =

- Classification: Division I
- Season: 1989–90
- Teams: 8
- Site: Redbird Arena; Normal, Illinois
- Champions: Illinois State (2nd title)
- Winning coach: Bob Bender (1st title)
- MVP: Rickey Jackson (Illinois State)

1989–90 Missouri Valley Conference men's basketball standings
	Conf.				Overall
Team	W		L	PCT	W		L	PCT
Southern Illinois	10	–	4	.714	26	–	8	.765
Illinois State †	9	–	5	.643	18	–	13	.581
Creighton	9	–	5	.643	21	–	12	.636
Tulsa	9	–	5	.643	17	–	13	.567
Bradley	6	–	8	.429	11	–	20	.355
Wichita State	6	–	8	.429	10	–	19	.345
Drake	5	–	9	.357	13	–	18	.419
Indiana State	2	–	12	.143	8	–	20	.286
† 1990 MVC tournament winner Rankings from AP Poll

The 1990 Missouri Valley Conference men's basketball tournament was played after the conclusion of the 1989–1990 regular season at Redbird Arena on the campus of Illinois State University in Normal, Illinois.

The Illinois State Redbirds defeated the Southern Illinois Salukis in the championship game, 81-78, and as a result won their 2nd MVC Tournament title and earned an automatic bid to the 1990 NCAA tournament.

It was also the final MVC tournament played on a campus site, before moving the entire event to St. Louis the following season.

== Bracket ==
Quarterfinals; March 3, 1989
1	Southern Illinois	70
8	Indiana State	54
4	Tulsa	71
5	Bradley	69
2	Illinois State	70
7	Drake	66
3	Creighton	63
6	Wichita State	62

Semifinals; March 4, 1989
1	Southern Illinois	75
4	Tulsa	65
2	Illinois State	69
3	Creighton	64

Final; March 5, 1989
1	Southern Illinois	78
2	Illinois State	81
