= 1993–94 Tulsa Golden Hurricane men's basketball team =

American college basketball season

1993–94 Tulsa Golden Hurricane men's basketball

MVC regular season champion

NCAA tournament, Sweet Sixteen
- Conference: Missouri Valley Conference

Ranking
- Coaches: No. 19
- Record: 23–8 (15–3 MVC)
- Head coach: Tubby Smith
- Home arena: Tulsa Convention Center

1993–94 Missouri Valley Conference men's basketball standings
	Conf.				Overall
Team	W		L	PCT	W		L	PCT
Tulsa	15	–	3	.833	23	–	8	.742
Bradley	14	–	4	.778	23	–	8	.742
Southern Illinois †	14	–	4	.778	23	–	7	.767
Illinois State	12	–	6	.667	16	–	11	.593
Northern Iowa	10	–	8	.556	16	–	13	.552
Southwest Missouri State	7	–	11	.389	12	–	15	.444
Wichita State	6	–	12	.333	9	–	18	.333
Drake	6	–	12	.333	11	–	16	.407
Creighton	3	–	15	.167	7	–	22	.241
Indiana State	3	–	15	.167	4	–	22	.154
† 1994 MVC tournament winner Rankings from AP Poll

The 1993–94 Tulsa Golden Hurricane men's basketball team represented the University of Tulsa as a member of the Missouri Valley Conference during the 1993–94 college basketball season. The Golden Hurricane played their home games at the Tulsa Convention Center. Led by head coach Tubby Smith, they finished the season 23–8 overall and 15–3 in conference play to finish atop the MVC standings. After losing in the semifinal round of the MVC tournament, the team defeated UCLA and Oklahoma State to reach the Sweet Sixteen of the NCAA tournament, before falling to eventual National champion Arkansas in the Midwest Regional semifinals.

== Roster ==
1993–94 Tulsa Golden Hurricane men's basketball team
Players
Coaches

Pos.	#	Name	Height	Weight	Year	Hometown
G	21	Shea Seals	6 ft 5 in (1.96 m)	200 lb (91 kg)	Fr	Tulsa, Oklahoma
SF	34	Gary Collier	6 ft 4 in (1.93 m)	195 lb (88 kg)	Sr	Fort Worth, Texas

Head coach

Tubby Smith

Assistant coach(es)

Legend

- (C) Team captain
- (S) Suspended
- (I) Ineligible
- (W) Walk-on
- Injured
- Current redshirt

== Schedule and results ==
Date time, TV	Rank^{#}	Opponent^{#}	Result	Record	Site (attendance) city, state
Regular season
Nov 27, 1993		Houston Baptist	W 128–63	1–0	Tulsa Convention Center (6,364); Tulsa, Oklahoma
Dec 1, 1993*		at North Texas	W 76–62	2–0	Super Pit (1,877); Denton, Texas
Dec 6, 1993*		at Oral Roberts	W 94–74	3–0	Mabee Center (5,126); Tulsa, Oklahoma
Dec 11, 1993*		SW Missouri State	W 66–56	4–0	Tulsa Convention Center (6,576); Tulsa, Oklahoma
Dec 20, 1993*		No. 22 Oklahoma State	L 61–73	4–1	Tulsa Convention Center (8,659); Tulsa, Oklahoma
Dec 23, 1993*		No. 1 Arkansas	L 91–93 ^{OT}	4–2	Tulsa Convention Center (8,759); Tulsa, Oklahoma
Dec 29, 1993*		vs. Texas Tech; All-College Tournament	W 96–77	5–2	Myriad Convention Center (5,810); Oklahoma City, Oklahoma
Dec 30, 1993*		vs. Oklahoma; All-College Tournament	L 76–95	5–3	Myriad Convention Center (9,218); Oklahoma City, Oklahoma
MVC Tournament
Mar 5, 1994*	(1)	vs. (8) Drake; Quarterfinals	W 91–82	21–6	St. Louis Arena (6,826); St. Louis, Missouri
Mar 6, 1994*	(1)	vs. (5) Northern Iowa; Semifinals	L 73–79	21–7	St. Louis Arena (10,077); St. Louis, Missouri
NCAA Tournament
Mar 18, 1994*; CBS	(12 MW)	vs. (5 MW) No. 17 UCLA; First Round	W 112–102	22–7	Myriad Convention Center (13,336); Oklahoma City, Oklahoma
Mar 20, 1994*; CBS	(12 MW)	vs. (4 MW) No. 19 Oklahoma State; Second Round	W 82–80	23–7	Myriad Convention Center (13,336); Oklahoma City, Oklahoma
Mar 25, 1994*; CBS	(12 MW)	vs. (1 MW) No. 2 Arkansas; Midwest Regional semifinal – Sweet Sixteen	L 84–103	23–8	Reunion Arena (16,297); Dallas, Texas
*Non-conference game. ^{#}Rankings from AP. (#) Tournament seedings in parentheses. MW=Midwest. All times are in Central.

== Awards and honors ==
- Gary Collier – MVC Player of the Year

== NBA draft ==
Round	Pick	Player	NBA Team
2	42	Gary Collier	Cleveland Cavaliers
