= Gary Collier =

Gary Collier may refer to:

- Gary Collier (basketball) (born 1971), retired American basketball player
- Gary Collier (footballer) (born 1955), English former footballer
