= Kevin Dillard =

American basketball player (born 1989)

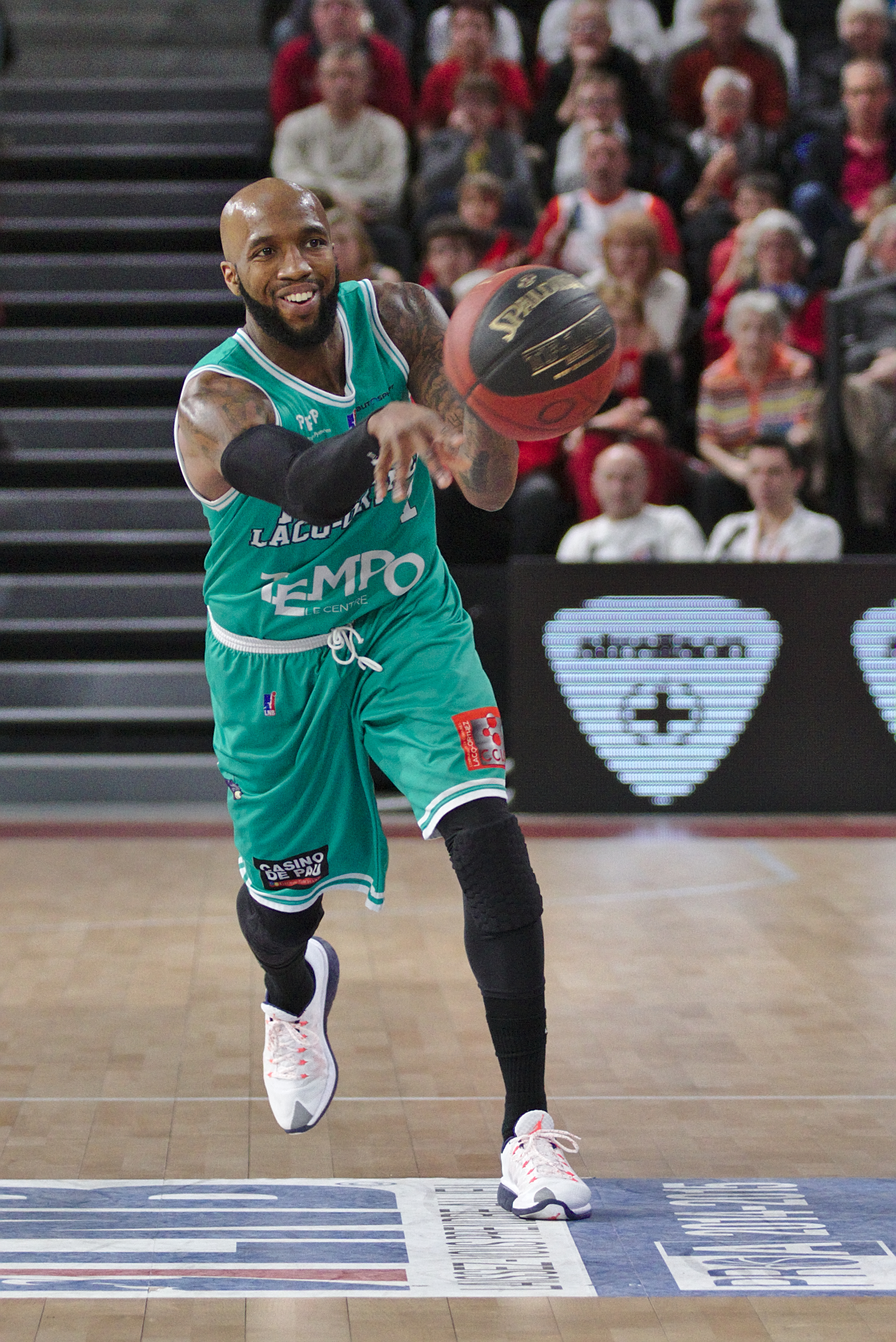

Free Agent
- Position: Point guard

Personal information
- Born: October 15, 1989 (age 37) Homewood, Illinois
- Listed height: 6 ft 0 in (1.83 m)
- Listed weight: 182 lb (83 kg)

Career information
- High school: Homewood-Flossmoor (Flossmoor, Illinois)
- College: Southern Illinois (2008–2010); Dayton (2011–2013)
- NBA draft: 2013: undrafted
- Playing career: 2013–present

Career history
- 2013–2014: Novipiù Casale Monferrato
- 2014: VEF Rīga
- 2014–2015: Élan Béarnais Pau-Orthez
- 2015: Cholet Basket
- 2015–2016: Apollon Patras
- 2016: Antwerp Giants
- 2016: Pınar Karşıyaka
- 2017: New Zealand Breakers
- 2017: Maccabi Ashdod
- 2017: PAOK Thessaloniki
- 2018: EGIS Körmend
- 2019–2020: Sigortam.net İTÜ BB
- 2020–2021: Soproni KC
- 2021: CS Dinamo București
- 2021–2022: KK Gostivar

Career highlights
- 2× Second-team All-Atlantic 10 (2012, 2013); MVC Freshman of the Year (2009); MVC All-Freshman Team (2009); MVC All-Newcomer Team (2009); Illinois Mr. Basketball (2008)

Kevin Andre Dillard (born October 15, 1989) is an American-Albanian professional basketball player for KK Gostivar of the Macedonian First League.

== High school ==
Dillard attended and played high school basketball Homewood-Flossmoor High School, in Flossmoor, Illinois, where he was named the 2008 Illinois Mr. Basketball.

== College career ==
After graduating from Homewood-Flossmoor High, Dillard played two years of college basketball for Southern Illinois University. After the 2009–10 season, Dillard transferred to Dayton. He had to sit out one season under NCAA rules. He was named to the All-Atlantic 10 Second Team, as a junior and senior.

=== College statistics ===
Year	Team	GP	GS	MPG	FG%	3P%	FT%	RPG	APG	SPG	BPG	PPG
2008–09	Southern Illinois	31		30.9	.441	.452	.727	2.0	4.2	1.3	0.2	12.2
2009–10	Southern Illinois	29		28.9	.423	.320	.773	3.1	5.0	1.1	0.1	12.3
2011–12	Dayton Flyers	33		32.7	.412	.325	.827	2.7	6.0	1.4	0.4	13.3
2012–13	Dayton Flyers	31		33.0	.405	.396	.892	1.9	4.5	1.1	0.1	15.3

== Professional career ==
Dillard failed to be drafted at the 2013 NBA draft. On August 7, 2013, he signed with A.S. Junior Casale of Italy, for the 2013–14 season.

On July 4, 2014, he signed with VEF Rīga of Latvia. On November 8, 2014, he parted ways with VEF Rīga. On December 8, 2014, he signed with Élan Béarnais Pau-Orthez of France, for the rest of the season.

On August 1, 2015, he signed with MHP Riesen Ludwigsburg of Germany, for the 2015–16 season. However, on September 4, 2015, he parted ways with Ludwigsburg, before appearing in a game for them.

On October 27, 2015, he signed with Cholet Basket of France. On November 25, 2015, he left Cholet, and signed with the Greek club Apollon Patras. On April 2, 2016, he signed with the Belgian club Antwerp Giants, for the rest of the season.

On July 27, 2016, Dillard signed with Turkish club Pınar Karşıyaka. On December 4, 2016, he was excused from the team, with poor playing performance being cited as the reasons for the decision. In the wake of the falling out with his club, he did not re-join the team at all during the rest of December, while instead looking for another gig elsewhere.

On January 7, 2017, he signed with the New Zealand Breakers, for the rest of the 2016–17 NBL season. On February 22, 2017, he signed with Israeli club Maccabi Ashdod.

On July 8, 2017, Dillard signed with PAOK Thessaloniki of the Greek League. On November 4, 2017, he parted ways with PAOK. On January 18, 2018, he signed with Hungarian club EGIS Körmend.

On October 10, 2019, he has signed with Sigortam.net İTÜ BB of the Basketball Super League. Dillard averaged 10 points and 5.6 assists per game. On July 27, 2020, he signed in Hungary with Soproni KC.

Dillard played one game for CS Dinamo București in 2021. On February 27, 2022, he signed with KK Gostivar of the Macedonian First League.

Awards and achievements
Preceded by Derrick Rose	Illinois Mr. Basketball Award Winner; 2008	Succeeded by Brandon Paul
