= Darren Brooks =

American basketball player (born 1982)

Personal information
- Born: August 28, 1982 (age 44) St. Louis, Missouri, U.S.
- Listed height: 6 ft 3 in (1.91 m)
- Listed weight: 205 lb (93 kg)

Career information
- High school: Jennings (Jennings, Missouri)
- College: Southern Illinois (2000–2005)
- NBA draft: 2005: undrafted
- Playing career: 2005–2008
- Position: Point guard / shooting guard

Career history
- 2005: MPC Capitals
- 2005: Stal Ostrów Wielkopolski
- 2006: Albuquerque Thunderbirds
- 2006–2007: Perth Wildcats
- 2007: Atléticos de San Germán
- 2007–2008: BG Göttingen
- 2008: APOEL B.C.

Career highlights
- 2× MVC Player of the Year (2004, 2005)

Darren Darnell Brooks (born August 28, 1982) is an American professional basketball player. A 6'3" 205 pound (93 kg) point guard / shooting guard, Brooks' professional career began in 2005–06 and has taken him to numerous countries and leagues around the world. He is best known in the United States for his collegiate career at Southern Illinois University Carbondale (SIU), here he was the back-to-back Missouri Valley Conference Player of the Year and Defensive Player of the Year. He now coaches high school basketball at the charter school, High Point Academy and has his own basketball academy.

== Early life and personal ==
Brooks was born in St. Louis, Missouri to parents Jacqueline, who is a real estate agent, and Thomas, who works for Boeing. He was a multi-sport star athlete at Jennings High School while playing quarterback for the football team, pitcher and shortstop for the baseball team, and as an undersized center for the basketball team.

He played QB on his high school football team and was named Player of the Year in the conference. He also led the league in passing yards and TD passes and it was said he can throw a football 60+ yards. Both Wisconsin and Iowa asked him to walk-on and play QB for their schools. He also played shortstop and pitcher in high school. The Atlanta Braves and Arizona Diamondbacks tried to persuade him to play pro baseball, but he decided to stick with basketball.

Despite being only 6'3", Brooks was utilized as an undersized center. During his 1999–2000 senior season, he averaged 25.0 points and 6.2 rebounds per game and guided his school to a 26–8 record where they lost in the state's 3A semifinals. For the year, Brooks scored a still-standing school record 775 points. He was a finalist for the "Mr. Show-Me Basketball" award, which is given annually to the top boys' high school basketball player in the state of Missouri. To cap his career he scored 24 points in the Missouri All-Stars game.

== College ==
Brooks entered SIU in 2000–01 and played in two total games during his freshman season before redshirting the remainder of the year. As a redshirt freshman the next season, he came off the bench to average 9.4 points per game while his 340 total points were the seventh most in the nation for players who did not start. In a first round match-up of the 2002 NCAA Tournament he scored 16 points as #11 SIU upset #6 Texas Tech, 76–68. The Salukis were the "darling" of that year's tournament by making it all the way to the Sweet 16 before losing to #2 Connecticut, 71–59.

In 2002–03, Brooks' sophomore season, he increased his scoring, rebounding, assists and steals per game averages. His 62 total steals were the most in the Missouri Valley Conference and the second most in school history, while his 103 assists were the eighth most. He was named to the All-MVC Defensive Team and also earned the league's Most Improved Player award. SIU qualified for that year's NCAA Tournament but lost in the opening round.

Brooks' junior year saw him earn his first of two MVC Player of the Year and MVC Defensive Player of the Year awards as well as selections to the All-Defensive Team, First Team All-Conference and All-MVC Tournament Team. His 16.5 points per game led the conference while Brooks also landed in the top 10 in rebounds (8th), assists (9th) and steals (2nd). In a game against Drake he recorded a school-record eight steals. The Associated Press also named him an honorable mention All-American. The Salukis earned an at-large bid to the 2004 NCAA Tournament where they were given the #9 seed. They lost in the first round to #8 Alabama by one point, however.

As a senior in 2004–05, Brooks entered the year as the consensus preseason conference player of the year. He did not disappoint, leading SIU to their fourth consecutive regular season Missouri Valley Conference championship. He led the team in scoring, rebounding, assists and steals and broke the program's single season records for steals (70) and assists (150). In the early season Las Vegas Invitational, Brooks was named the Tournament MVP. On the year he was in the conference's top five in several major per-game statistical categories, including steals (1st), assists (5th) and points (5th). Once again, SIU qualified for the NCAA Tournament, this time as a #7 seed. After defeating # 10 Saint Mary's in the opening round, the Salukis lost to #2 Oklahoma State, 85–77, in the round of 32, thus ending Brooks' collegiate career.

When Brooks graduated in 2005, he had become one of the most decorated men's basketball players in Missouri Valley Conference history. He was the first player ever to win both Player of the Year and Defensive Player of the Year in consecutive seasons. Only one other player, Hersey Hawkins of Bradley, had compiled at least 1,500 points, 600 rebounds, 400 assists and 250 steals. Brooks also won more games in a Saluki uniform than any other player in school history, and his guidance in their four consecutive regular season conference championships has not been duplicated. Despite his lauded career, Brooks went undrafted in that year's National Basketball Association Draft.

== Professional ==
When he was passed up in the draft, Brooks signed with the Dutch team MPC Capitals and played for them until November. Appearing in only six games, he then left the squad and signed with the Polish team Stal Ostrów Wielkopolski. He recorded seven points, three rebounds, one assist and, one block in his only game with the team. Finally, in February 2006, he signed with the NBA Development League's Albuquerque Thunderbirds for the remainder of the 2005–06 season. He appeared in 23 games and was part of the championship-winning Thunderbirds—their lone championship title before disbanding—as they defeated the Fort Worth Flyers in the one-game final.

The following year, Brooks traveled to Australia to play for the Perth Wildcats in the National Basketball League. He had a successful tenure with the Wildcats – he appeared in 34 games and averaged 15.7 points, 5.7 rebounds, 2.9 assists and 2.0 steals per game. His steals average was the second highest in the league. Brooks shot 49% from the field and 40% from three-point range. In May 2007, he temporarily signed with Atléticos de San Germán of Puerto Rico's Baloncesto Superior Nacional, appearing in only nine games.

For the 2007–08 season he traveled to Germany for a stint on BG Göttingen, a team that competes in the Basketball Bundesliga. In 33 games he averaged 13.7 points, 4.3 rebounds, 1.7 assists and 1.7 steals per game. Once again, Brooks left after one year. He then suited up for APOEL B.C. in Cyprus but only played in the 2009–10 preseason.
