= Missouri Valley Conference men's basketball tournament =

Men's basketball championship tournament

- Conference basketball championship
- Sport: College basketball
- Conference: Missouri Valley Conference
- Number of teams: 11
- Format: Single-elimination tournament
- Current stadium: Enterprise Center
- Current location: St. Louis, Missouri
- Played: 1977–present
- Last contest: 2026
- Current champion: Northern Iowa
- Most championships: Creighton (12)
- Official website: Missouri Valley Conference

The State Farm Missouri Valley Conference men's basketball tournament, commonly called Arch Madness, is an annual basketball tournament which features the men's basketball teams of each of the Missouri Valley Conference member universities. The tournament, held in St. Louis since 1991, determines which MVC team receives an automatic bid to the NCAA Division I men's basketball tournament. Arch Madness celebrated its 30th anniversary in 2020.

The tournament is the second longest running tournament in NCAA Division I to continuously be held in one city, next to the Big East men's basketball tournament. (Note: The Big East did not conclude their 2020 tournament due to the COVID-19 pandemic. The Valley does not attempt to claim the longest running title due to the circumstances surrounding the pandemic.)

== Tournament champions by year ==
Year	Champion	Score	Runner-up	Tournament MVP	Location
1977	Southern Illinois	82–69	West Texas State	None Selected	Henry Levitt Arena (Wichita, Kansas)
1978	Creighton	54–52	Indiana State	None Selected	Omaha Civic Auditorium (Omaha, Nebraska)
1979	Indiana State	69–59	New Mexico State	None Selected	Hulman Center (Terre Haute, Indiana)
1980	Bradley	62–59	West Texas State	None Selected	Robertson Memorial Field House (Peoria, Illinois)
1981	Creighton	70–64	Wichita State	None Selected	Henry Levitt Arena (Wichita, Kansas)
1982	Tulsa	90–77	Illinois State	None Selected	Tulsa Convention Center (Tulsa, Oklahoma)
1983	Illinois State	84–64	Tulsa	None Selected	Horton Fieldhouse (Normal, Illinois)
1984	Tulsa	70–68 ^{OT}	Creighton	None Selected	Tulsa Convention Center (Tulsa, Oklahoma)
1985	Wichita State	84–82	Tulsa	None Selected	Tulsa Convention Center (Tulsa, Oklahoma)
1986	Tulsa	74–58	Bradley	Brian Rahilly, Tulsa	Tulsa Convention Center (Tulsa, Oklahoma)
1987	Wichita State	79–74 ^{OT}	Tulsa	Gary Cundiff, Wichita State	Tulsa Convention Center (Tulsa, Oklahoma)
1988	Bradley	83–59	Illinois State	Hersey Hawkins, Bradley	Carver Arena (Peoria, Illinois)
1989	Creighton	79–77	Southern Illinois	Chad Gallagher, Creighton	Henry Levitt Arena (Wichita, Kansas)
1990	Illinois State	81–78	Southern Illinois	Rickey Jackson, Illinois State	Redbird Arena (Normal, Illinois)
1991	Creighton	68–52	Southwest Missouri State	Bob Harstad, Creighton	Kiel Auditorium (St. Louis, Missouri)
1992	Southwest Missouri State	71–68	Tulsa	Jackie Crawford, Southwest Missouri State	St. Louis Arena (St. Louis, Missouri)
1993	Southern Illinois	70–59	Illinois State	Ashraf Amaya, Southern Illinois	St. Louis Arena (St. Louis, Missouri)
1994	Southern Illinois	77–74	Northern Iowa	Cam Johnson, Northern Iowa	St. Louis Arena (St. Louis, Missouri)
1995	Southern Illinois	77–62	Tulsa	Chris Carr, Southern Illinois	Kiel Center/ Savvis Center/ Scottrade Center/ Enterprise Center (St. Louis, Missouri)
1996	Tulsa	60–46	Bradley	Shea Seals, Tulsa	Kiel Center/ Savvis Center/ Scottrade Center/ Enterprise Center (St. Louis, Missouri)
1997	Illinois State	75–72	Southwest Missouri State	Rico Hill, Illinois State	Kiel Center/ Savvis Center/ Scottrade Center/ Enterprise Center (St. Louis, Missouri)
1998	Illinois State	84–74	Southwest Missouri State	Dan Muller, Illinois State	Kiel Center/ Savvis Center/ Scottrade Center/ Enterprise Center (St. Louis, Missouri)
1999	Creighton	70–61	Evansville	Rodney Buford, Creighton	Kiel Center/ Savvis Center/ Scottrade Center/ Enterprise Center (St. Louis, Missouri)
2000	Creighton	57–45	Southwest Missouri State	Ryan Sears, Creighton	Kiel Center/ Savvis Center/ Scottrade Center/ Enterprise Center (St. Louis, Missouri)
2001	Indiana State	69–63	Bradley	Michael Menser, Indiana State	Kiel Center/ Savvis Center/ Scottrade Center/ Enterprise Center (St. Louis, Missouri)
2002	Creighton	84–76	Southern Illinois	Kyle Korver, Creighton	Kiel Center/ Savvis Center/ Scottrade Center/ Enterprise Center (St. Louis, Missouri)
2003	Creighton	80–56	Southern Illinois	Kyle Korver, Creighton	Kiel Center/ Savvis Center/ Scottrade Center/ Enterprise Center (St. Louis, Missouri)
2004	Northern Iowa	79–74 ^{2OT}	Southwest Missouri State	Ben Jacobson, Northern Iowa	Kiel Center/ Savvis Center/ Scottrade Center/ Enterprise Center (St. Louis, Missouri)
2005	Creighton	75–57	Southwest Missouri State	Johnny Mathies, Creighton	Kiel Center/ Savvis Center/ Scottrade Center/ Enterprise Center (St. Louis, Missouri)
2006	Southern Illinois	59–46	Bradley	Randal Falker, Southern Illinois	Kiel Center/ Savvis Center/ Scottrade Center/ Enterprise Center (St. Louis, Missouri)
2007	Creighton	67–61	Southern Illinois	Nate Funk, Creighton	Kiel Center/ Savvis Center/ Scottrade Center/ Enterprise Center (St. Louis, Missouri)
2008	Drake	79–49	Illinois State	Adam Emmenecker, Drake	Kiel Center/ Savvis Center/ Scottrade Center/ Enterprise Center (St. Louis, Missouri)
2009	Northern Iowa	60–57 ^{OT}	Illinois State	Osiris Eldridge, Illinois State	Kiel Center/ Savvis Center/ Scottrade Center/ Enterprise Center (St. Louis, Missouri)
2010	Northern Iowa	67–52	Wichita State	Kwadzo Ahelegbe, Northern Iowa	Kiel Center/ Savvis Center/ Scottrade Center/ Enterprise Center (St. Louis, Missouri)
2011	Indiana State	60–56	Missouri State	Jermaine Mallett, Missouri State	Kiel Center/ Savvis Center/ Scottrade Center/ Enterprise Center (St. Louis, Missouri)
2012	Creighton	83–79 ^{OT}	Illinois State	Doug McDermott, Creighton	Kiel Center/ Savvis Center/ Scottrade Center/ Enterprise Center (St. Louis, Missouri)
2013	Creighton	68–65	Wichita State	Doug McDermott, Creighton	Kiel Center/ Savvis Center/ Scottrade Center/ Enterprise Center (St. Louis, Missouri)
2014	Wichita State	83–69	Indiana State	Tekele Cotton, Wichita State	Kiel Center/ Savvis Center/ Scottrade Center/ Enterprise Center (St. Louis, Missouri)
2015	Northern Iowa	69–60	Illinois State	Seth Tuttle, Northern Iowa	Kiel Center/ Savvis Center/ Scottrade Center/ Enterprise Center (St. Louis, Missouri)
2016	Northern Iowa	56–54	Evansville	Wes Washpun, Northern Iowa	Kiel Center/ Savvis Center/ Scottrade Center/ Enterprise Center (St. Louis, Missouri)
2017	Wichita State	71–51	Illinois State	Conner Frankamp, Wichita State	Kiel Center/ Savvis Center/ Scottrade Center/ Enterprise Center (St. Louis, Missouri)
2018	Loyola Chicago	65–49	Illinois State	Donte Ingram, Loyola Chicago	Kiel Center/ Savvis Center/ Scottrade Center/ Enterprise Center (St. Louis, Missouri)
2019	Bradley	57–54	Northern Iowa	Elijah Childs, Bradley	Kiel Center/ Savvis Center/ Scottrade Center/ Enterprise Center (St. Louis, Missouri)
2020	Bradley	80–66	Valparaiso	Darrell Brown, Bradley	Kiel Center/ Savvis Center/ Scottrade Center/ Enterprise Center (St. Louis, Missouri)
2021	Loyola Chicago	75–65	Drake	Cameron Krutwig, Loyola Chicago	Kiel Center/ Savvis Center/ Scottrade Center/ Enterprise Center (St. Louis, Missouri)
2022	Loyola Chicago	64–58	Drake	Lucas Williamson, Loyola Chicago	Kiel Center/ Savvis Center/ Scottrade Center/ Enterprise Center (St. Louis, Missouri)
2023	Drake	77–51	Bradley	Tucker DeVries, Drake	Kiel Center/ Savvis Center/ Scottrade Center/ Enterprise Center (St. Louis, Missouri)
2024	Drake	84–80	Indiana State	Tucker DeVries, Drake	Kiel Center/ Savvis Center/ Scottrade Center/ Enterprise Center (St. Louis, Missouri)
2025	Drake	63–48	Bradley	Bennett Stirtz, Drake	Kiel Center/ Savvis Center/ Scottrade Center/ Enterprise Center (St. Louis, Missouri)
2026	Northern Iowa	84–69	UIC	Trey Campbell, Northern Iowa	Kiel Center/ Savvis Center/ Scottrade Center/ Enterprise Center (St. Louis, Missouri)

Team notes: West Texas State is now known as West Texas A&M (effective 1990);
Missouri State was known as Southwest Missouri State until 2005.

Venue notes: Enterprise Center was known as Kiel Center (1994–2000), Savvis Center (2000–06), and Scottrade Center (2006–18).

== Tournament championships by school ==
School	Championships	Championship Years
Creighton ^{†}	12	1978, 1981, 1989, 1991, 1999, 2000, 2002, 2003, 2005, 2007, 2012, 2013
Northern Iowa	6	2004, 2009, 2010, 2015, 2016, 2026
Southern Illinois	5	1977, 1993, 1994, 1995, 2006
Tulsa ^{†}	4	1982, 1984, 1986, 1996
Illinois State	4	1983, 1990, 1997, 1998
Wichita State ^{†}	4	1985, 1987, 2014, 2017
Bradley	4	1980, 1988, 2019, 2020
Drake	4	2008, 2023, 2024, 2025
Indiana State	3	1979, 2001, 2011
Loyola Chicago ^{†}	3	2018, 2021, 2022
Missouri State ^{†}	1	1992
New Mexico State ^{†}	0	
West Texas State ^{†}	0	
Evansville	0	
Valparaiso	0	
Belmont	0	
UIC	0	
Murray State	0	

- ^{†} Former conference member

Team notes: West Texas State is now known as West Texas A&M (effective 1990);
Missouri State was known as Southwest Missouri State until 2005.

=== Postseason History Multiple Bids ===
NCAA tournament
Year	MVC Teams			
1979	(1) Indiana State	(10) New Mexico State		
1981	(6) Wichita State	(8) Creighton		
1984	(4) Tulsa	(8) Illinois State		
1985	(6) Tulsa	(9) Illinois State	(11) Wichita State	
1986	(7) Bradley	(10) Tulsa		
1987	(11) Tulsa	(11) Wichita State		
1988	(9) Bradley	(12) Wichita State		
1994	(11) Southern Illinois	(12) Tulsa		
1995	(6) Tulsa	(10) Southern Illinois		
1996	(8) Bradley	(11) Tulsa		
1999	(10) Creighton	(11) Evansville	(12) Southwest Missouri State	
2000	(10) Creighton	(12) Indiana State		
2001	(10) Creighton	(13) Indiana State		
2002	(11) Southern Illinois	(12) Creighton		
2003	(6) Creighton	(11) Southern Illinois		
2004	(9) Southern Illinois	(14) Northern Iowa		
2005	(7) Southern Illinois	(10) Creighton	(11) Northern Iowa	
2006	(7) Wichita State	(10) Northern Iowa	(11) Southern Illinois	(13) Bradley
2007	(4) Southern Illinois	(10) Creighton		
2012	(5) Wichita State	(8) Creighton		
2013	(7) Creighton	(9) Wichita State		
2015	(5) Northern Iowa	(7) Wichita State		
2016	(11) Northern Iowa	(11) Wichita State		
2021	(8) Loyola Chicago	(11) Drake		

== Broadcasters ==
=== Television ===
Year	Network	Play-by-play	Analyst	Sideline
2026	CBS	Kevin Harlan	Robbie Hummel	Evan Washburn
2025	CBS	Kevin Harlan	Dan Bonner	Evan Washburn
2024	CBS	Kevin Harlan	Dan Bonner	Evan Washburn
2023	CBS	Kevin Harlan	Dan Bonner	Evan Washburn
2022	CBS	Kevin Harlan	Dan Bonner	Evan Washburn
2021	CBS	Kevin Harlan	Dan Bonner	
2020	CBS	Kevin Harlan	Dan Bonner	John Schriffen
2019	CBS	Kevin Harlan	Dan Bonner	Melanie Collins
2018	CBS	Kevin Harlan	Dan Bonner	John Schriffen
2017	CBS	Kevin Harlan	Dan Bonner	John Schriffen
2016	CBS	Kevin Harlan	Dan Bonner	Evan Washburn
2015	CBS	Verne Lundquist	Jim Spanarkel	Allie LaForce
2014	CBS	Kevin Harlan	Dan Bonner	
2013	CBS	Tim Brando	Bill Raftery	
2012	CBS	Tim Brando	Mike Gminski	
2011	CBS	Ian Eagle	Jim Spanarkel	
2010	CBS	Dick Enberg	Bill Raftery	
2009	CBS	Dick Enberg	Bob Wenzel	
2008	CBS	Dick Enberg	Bob Wenzel	
2007	CBS	Gus Johnson	Clark Kellogg	
2006	CBS	Dick Enberg	Clark Kellogg	
2005	ESPN	Dave Barnett	Tim McCormick	
2004	ESPN	Bob Carpenter	Jimmy Dykes	
2003	ESPN	Bob Carpenter	Jimmy Dykes	
2002	ESPN	Bob Carpenter	Jimmy Dykes	
2001	ESPN	Bob Carpenter	Jimmy Dykes	
2000	ESPN	Bob Carpenter	Larry Conley	
1999	ESPN	Joel Meyers	Larry Conley	
1998	ESPN	Ron Franklin	Jimmy Dykes	
1997	ESPN	Ron Franklin	Jon Sundvold	
1996	ESPN	Ron Franklin	Jimmy Dykes	
1995	ESPN	Doug Bell	Reggie Theus	
1994	ESPN	Ron Franklin	Terry Holland	
1993	ESPN	Barry Tompkins	Larry Conley	
1992	ESPN	Barry Tompkins	Jon Albright	
1991	ESPN	John Paul Dellacamera	Greg Sterrick	
1990	ESPN	John Paul Dellacamera	Jon Albright	
1989	ESPN	John Paul Dellacamera	Jim Gibbons	
1988	ESPN	Wayne Larrivee	Mike Pratt	
1987	ESPN	Wayne Larrivee	Mike Pratt	
1986	ESPN	Wayne Larrivee	Larry Conley	
1985				
1984				
1983	CBS	Verne Lundquist	Irv Brown	
1982	NBC			
1981	ESPN			
1980	NBC			
1979	NBC			
1978				
1977				

=== Radio ===
Year	Network	Play-by-play	Analyst
2025	Westwood One		
2024	Westwood One		
2023	Westwood One	Ted Emrich	Jon Crispin
2022	Westwood One	John Sadak	Fran Fraschilla
2021	KTRS 550	Martin Kilcoyne, Harry Schoreder, Brendan Wiese	Kevin Lehman, Rich Zvosec
2020	KTRS 550	Brendan Wiese	Kevin Lehman, Rich Zvosec
2019	KTRS 550	Brendan Wiese	Kevin Lehman, Rich Zvosec
2016	Westwood One	Chris Carrino	Kevin Grevey
2015	Westwood One	Tom McCarthy	Bill Frieder
2014	Westwood One	Wayne Larrivee	Bill Frieder
2013	Dial Global Sports	Dave Ryan	Pete Gillen
2012	Dial Global Sports	Wayne Larrivee	Kyle Macy
2009	Westwood One	Kevin Kugler	Reid Gettys
2007	Westwood One	Kevin Kugler	Pete Gillen
