= 1989–90 Illinois State Redbirds men's basketball team =

American college basketball season

1989–90 Illinois State Redbirds men's basketball

MVC tournament champion

NCAA tournament, first round
- Conference: Missouri Valley Conference
- Record: 18–13 (9–5 MVC)
- Head coach: Bob Bender (1st season)
- Assistant coaches: Ray Giacoletti; Billy King; Jay Lowenthal; Eric Hughes; Bob Morris
- Home arena: Redbird Arena

1989–90 Missouri Valley Conference men's basketball standings
	Conf.				Overall
Team	W		L	PCT	W		L	PCT
Southern Illinois	10	–	4	.714	26	–	8	.765
Illinois State †	9	–	5	.643	18	–	13	.581
Creighton	9	–	5	.643	21	–	12	.636
Tulsa	9	–	5	.643	17	–	13	.567
Bradley	6	–	8	.429	11	–	20	.355
Wichita State	6	–	8	.429	10	–	19	.345
Drake	5	–	9	.357	13	–	18	.419
Indiana State	2	–	12	.143	8	–	20	.286
† 1990 MVC tournament winner Rankings from AP Poll

The 1989–90 Illinois State Redbirds men's basketball team represented Illinois State University during the 1989–90 NCAA Division I men's basketball season. The Redbirds, led by first year head coach Bob Bender, played their first full season of home games at Redbird Arena and were members of the Missouri Valley Conference.

The Redbirds finished the season 18–13, 9–5 in conference play to finish in a three-way tie for second place. They were the number two seed for the Missouri Valley Conference tournament by virtue of holding tie-breakers over Creighton University and Tulsa University. They defeated Drake University in the quarterfinal round, Creighton University in the semifinal round, and Southern Illinois University in the final round to win the championship (their second in the conference).

The Redbirds won the conference autobid to the 1990 NCAA Division I men's basketball tournament. They were assigned to the West Regional as the number fourteen seed and lost to the University of Michigan in the first round.

== Roster ==
1989–90 Illinois State Redbirds men's basketball team
Players
Coaches

Pos.	#	Name	Height	Weight	Year	Hometown
C	53	Jon Pemberton	6 ft 9 in (2.06 m)	—	RS Sr	Bloomingdale, IL
G	23	Randy Blair	6 ft 3 in (1.91 m)	—	Sr	Peoria, IL
F	52	Jarrod Coleman	6 ft 7 in (2.01 m)	—	Sr	North Chicago, IL
G	43	Rickey Jackson	6 ft 5 in (1.96 m)	—	Sr	Mount Morris, MI
F	44	Sonny Roberts	6 ft 8 in (2.03 m)	—	Sr	South Beloit, IL
G	3	Sam Skarich	6 ft 5 in (1.96 m)	—	RS Jr	St. Cloud, MN
C	22	Rick Bettenhausen	7 ft 0 in (2.13 m)	—	Jr	Peotone, IL
F	35	Derek Stokes	6 ft 6 in (1.98 m)	—	Jr	Rockford, IL
F	54	Dan Cox	6 ft 9 in (2.06 m)	—	RS So	Normal, IL
F	42	Scott Fowler	6 ft 5 in (1.96 m)	—	RS So	Chicago, IL
G	33	Elvin Florez	6 ft 3 in (1.91 m)	—	So	Chicago, IL
G	11	Antoine Hicks	5 ft 9 in (1.75 m)	—	So	Chicago, IL
F	32	Xavier Williams	6 ft 6 in (1.98 m)	—	So	Michigan City, IN
G	12	Todd Kagel	6 ft 1 in (1.85 m)	—	Fr	Normal, IL
G	14	Richard Thomas	6 ft 0 in (1.83 m)	—	Fr	Chicago, IL

Head coach

- Bob Bender (Duke)

Assistant coach(es)

- Ray Giacoletti (Minot State)
- Billy King (Duke)
- Jay Lowenthal (Vanderbilt)
- Eric Hughes (Cal State East Bay)
- Bob Morris (Western Illinois)

Legend

- (C) Team captain
- (S) Suspended
- (I) Ineligible
- (W) Walk-on
- Injured
- Current redshirt

== Schedule ==
Date time, TV	Rank^{#}	Opponent^{#}	Result	Record	High points	High rebounds	High assists	Site (attendance) city, state
Exhibition Season
November 13, 1989*; 7:30 pm		Helsinki (Finland) YMCA	W 85–76		17 – Blair	8 – Coleman	6 – Blair	Redbird Arena; Normal, IL
November 17, 1989*; 7:30 pm		Marathon Oil	L 81–93		31 – Jackson	8 – Jackson	–	Redbird Arena; Normal, IL
Regular Season
November 25, 1989*; 7:00 pm		Wisconsin–Green Bay	L 66–69 ^{OT}	0–1	–	–	–	Redbird Arena (9,696); Normal, IL
November 27, 1989*; 7:30 pm		Butler	W 67–59 ^{OT}	1–1	–	–	–	Redbird Arena (7,676); Normal, IL
December 2, 1989*; 6:30 pm		at Fairleigh Dickinson	W 86–74	2–1	–	–	–	Rothman Center (1,802); Teaneck, NJ
December 4, 1989*; 8:35 pm		at Colorado	L 79–85	2–2	–	–	–	CU Events/Conference Center (2,043); Boulder, CO
December 7, 1989*; 7:30 pm		Purdue	L 69–83	2–3	–	–	–	Redbird Arena (9,251); Normal, IL
December 9, 1989*; 7:00 pm		Illinois–Chicago	W 69–65	3–3	–	–	–	Redbird Arena (8,611); Normal, IL
December 19, 1989*; 6:30 pm		at Kent State	L 69–73	3–4	–	–	–	Memorial Gym (1,500); Kent, OH
December 28, 1989*; 11:00 pm		vs. North Carolina–Charlotte; Far West Classic [Quarterfinal]	W 76–69	4–4	–	–	–	Memorial Coliseum (5,289); Portland, OR
December 29, 1989*; 11:00 pm		vs. Oregon; Far West Classic [Semifinal]	L 79–81	4–5	–	–	–	Memorial Coliseum (11,015); Portland, OR
December 30, 1989*; 9:00 pm		vs. Louisiana Tech; Far West Classic [Third Place]	L 69–90	4–6	–	–	–	Memorial Coliseum (11,015); Portland, OR
January 6, 1990; 7:00 pm		Southern Illinois	W 85–75	5–6 (1–0)	–	–	–	Redbird Arena (8,518); Normal, IL
January 11, 1990; 7:05 pm		at Drake	W 85–81	6–6 (2–0)	–	–	–	Veterans Memorial Auditorium (3,804); Des Moines, IA
January 13, 1990; 1:30 pm, SportsChannel		at Indiana State	L 45–58	6–7 (2–1)	–	–	–	Hulman Center (5,480); Terre Haute, IN
January 17, 1990*; 7:30 pm		at Western Illinois	L 63–64	6–8	–	–	–	Western Hall (3,731); Macomb, IL
January 20, 1990; 7:30 pm		at Creighton	L 75–82	6–9 (2–2)	19 – Jackson	8 – Blair, Roberts	4 – Thomas	Omaha Civic Auditorium (6,954); Omaha, NE
January 22, 1990; 7:30 pm		Drake	W 63–62	7–9 (3–2)	–	–	–	Redbird Arena (8,952); Normal, IL
January 25, 1990; 8:05 pm, WEEK/SportsChannel		at Bradley	W 74–72	8–9 (4–2)	–	–	–	Carver Arena (9,517); Peoria, IL
January 27, 1990; 7:00 pm		Wichita State	W 71–66 ^{OT}	9–9 (5–2)	20 – Jackson	8 – Blair	4 – Blair, Jackson, Thomas	Redbird Arena (10,125); Normal, IL
February 3, 1990; 11:00 am, SportsChannel		at Tulsa	L 60–84	9–10 (5–3)	–	–	–	Tulsa Convention Center (5,022); Tulsa, OK
February 6, 1990*; 7:30 pm		Saint Louis	W 65–61	10–10	–	–	–	Redbird Arena (9,608); Normal, IL
February 10, 1990; 7:00 pm		Indiana State	W 67–47	11–10 (6–3)	–	–	–	Redbird Arena (10,125); Normal, IL
February 12, 1990; 7:30 pm		Tulsa	W 79–75	12–10 (7–3)	–	–	–	Redbird Arena (8,566); Normal, IL
February 14, 1990*; 7:30 pm		at Loyola–Chicago	W 82–66	13–10	–	–	–	Alumni Gym (539); Chicago, IL
February 17, 1990; 11:00 am, SportsChannel		Bradley	W 81–68	14–10 (8–3)	–	–	–	Redbird Arena (10,125); Normal, IL
February 22, 1990; 7:30 pm		at Wichita State	L 52–66	14–11 (8–4)	19 – Coleman	9 – Blair	4 – Thomas	Henry Levitt Arena (9,688); Wichita, KS
February 24, 1990; 7:35 pm		at Southern Illinois	L 79–85	14–12 (8–5)	20 – Thomas	6 – Blair	6 – Thomas	SIU Arena (10,014); Carbondale, IL
February 26, 1990; 7:30 pm		Creighton	W 83–77	15–12 (9–5)	32 – Jackson	7 – Blair, Coleman	6 – Blair, Thomas	Redbird Arena (10,125); Normal, IL
Pepsi Missouri Valley Conference {MVC} tournament
March 3, 1990; 6:00 pm, SportsChannel	(2)	(7) Drake; Quarterfinal	W 77–62	16–12	16 – Fowler	8 – Blair	6 – Blair	Redbird Arena (8,620); Normal, IL
March 4, 1990; 3:00 pm, SportsChannel	(2)	(3) Creighton; Semifinal	W 69–64	17–12	17 – Jackson	7 – Pemberton	9 – Blair	Redbird Arena (8,653); Normal, IL
March 6, 1990; 8:30 pm, ESPN	(2)	(1) Southern Illinois; Final	W 81–78	18–12	23 – Coleman	6 – Pemberton	5 – Thomas	Redbird Arena (10,625); Normal, IL
National Collegiate Athletic Association {NCAA} tournament
March 16, 1990; 8:00 pm, NCAA Productions	(14)	vs. (3) No. 13 Michigan; West Region [First Round]	L 70–76	18–13	22 – Jackson	12 – Blair	9 – Blair	Long Beach Arena (12,200); Long Beach, CA
*Non-conference game. ^{#}Rankings from AP Poll. (#) Tournament seedings in parentheses. All times are in Central Standard Time.
