= 1992–93 Illinois State Redbirds men's basketball team =

American college basketball season

1992–93 Illinois State Redbirds men's basketball

MVC Regular Season Champion
- Conference: Missouri Valley Conference
- Record: 19–10 (13–5 MVC)
- Head coach: Bob Bender (4th season)
- Assistant coaches: Jay Lowenthal; Billy King; Ray Giacoletti
- Home arena: Redbird Arena

1992–93 Missouri Valley Conference men's basketball standings
	Conf.				Overall
Team	W		L	PCT	W		L	PCT
Illinois State	13	–	5	.722	19	–	10	.655
Southern Illinois †	12	–	6	.667	23	–	10	.697
Southwest Missouri State	11	–	7	.611	20	–	11	.645
Tulsa	10	–	8	.556	15	–	14	.517
Drake	9	–	9	.500	14	–	14	.500
Northern Iowa	8	–	10	.444	12	–	15	.444
Wichita State	7	–	11	.389	10	–	17	.370
Bradley	7	–	11	.389	11	–	16	.407
Indiana State	7	–	11	.389	11	–	17	.393
Creighton	6	–	12	.333	8	–	18	.308
† 1993 MVC tournament winner Rankings from AP Poll

The 1992–93 Illinois State Redbirds men's basketball team represented Illinois State University during the 1992–93 NCAA Division I men's basketball season. The Redbirds, led by fourth year head coach Bob Bender, played their home games at Redbird Arena and competed as a member of the Missouri Valley Conference.

They finished the season 19–10, 13–5 in conference play to finish in first place. They were the number one seed for the Missouri Valley Conference tournament. They were victorious over Indiana State University in their quarterfinal game and Drake University in their semifinal game, but were defeated by Southern Illinois University in their final game.

== Roster ==
1992–93 Illinois State Redbirds men's basketball team
Players
Coaches

Pos.	#	Name	Height	Weight	Year	Hometown
F	3	Steve Fitch	6 ft 6 in (1.98 m)	190 lb (86 kg)	Sr	Oak Park, IL
G	12	Todd Kagel	6 ft 0 in (1.83 m)	170 lb (77 kg)	Sr	Normal, IL
G	14	Richard Thomas	6 ft 0 in (1.83 m)	180 lb (82 kg)	Sr	Chicago, IL
F	54	Charles Barnes	6 ft 5 in (1.96 m)	200 lb (91 kg)	Jr	Chicago, IL
F	40	Thomas Hunter	6 ft 6 in (1.98 m)	235 lb (107 kg)	Jr	Nashville, TN
F	21	Scott Taylor	6 ft 8 in (2.03 m)	200 lb (91 kg)	Jr	Newton, MA
F	41	Mike VandeGarde	6 ft 8 in (2.03 m)	205 lb (93 kg)	Jr	Bloomington, MN
G	34	Todd Wemhoener	6 ft 2 in (1.88 m)	185 lb (84 kg)	Jr	Quincy, IL
G	22	Chad Altadonna	6 ft 3 in (1.91 m)	188 lb (85 kg)	So	Centralia, IL
C	43	Brian Kern	6 ft 9 in (2.06 m)	240 lb (109 kg)	So	Vandalia, IL
G	25	Antonio Cooper	5 ft 9 in (1.75 m)	165 lb (75 kg)	Fr	Phoenix, IL
F	42	Andy Hawkins	6 ft 7 in (2.01 m)	195 lb (88 kg)	Fr	London, OH
F	33	Jon Litwiller	6 ft 6 in (1.98 m)	185 lb (84 kg)	Fr	Morton, IL
C	44	Andy Porter	6 ft 7 in (2.01 m)	235 lb (107 kg)	Fr	Geneseo, IL

Head coach

- Bob Bender (Duke)

Assistant coach(es)

- Jay Lowenthal (Vanderbilt)
- Billy King (Duke)
- Ray Giacoletti (Minot State)

Legend

- (C) Team captain
- (S) Suspended
- (I) Ineligible
- (W) Walk-on
- Injured
- Current redshirt

== Schedule ==
Date time, TV	Rank^{#}	Opponent^{#}	Result	Record	High points	High rebounds	High assists	Site (attendance) city, state
Exhibition Season
November 19, 1992*; 7:30 pm		Arkansas Express						Redbird Arena; Normal, IL
November 25, 1992*; 7:30 pm		Cuban National						Redbird Arena; Normal, IL
Regular Season
December 2, 1992*; 7:30 pm		Lewis	W 82–69	1–0	–	–	–	Redbird Arena (7,064); Normal, IL
December 7, 1992*; 7:30 pm		Butler	W 69–53	2–0	–	–	–	Redbird Arena (6,986); Normal, IL
December 9, 1992*		DePaul	L 66–67	2–1	–	–	–	Redbird Arena (8,217); Normal, IL
December 12, 1992*; 7:35 pm		at Evansville	L 67–86	2–2	–	–	–	Roberts Municipal Stadium (11,679); Evansville, IN
December 19, 1992		at Tulsa	L 61–74	2–3 (0–1)	–	–	–	Tulsa Convention Center (5,119); Tulsa, OK
December 21, 1992; 7:35 pm		at Creighton	L 63–70	2–4 (0–2)	21 – VandeGarde	8 – VandeGarde	2 – Kagel, Thomas, Hunter, Altadonna	Omaha Civic Auditorium (3,766); Omaha, NE
December 29, 1992*; 7:35 pm		at Idaho State	L 56–66	2–5	–	–	–	Holt Arena (1,748); Pocatello, ID
January 2, 1993*; 3:00 pm		at Saint Mary's	W 64–44	3–5	–	–	–	McKeon Pavilion (1,469); Moraga, CA
January 6, 1993; 7:30 pm		Southwest Missouri State	W 65–57	4–5 (1–2)	–	–	–	Redbird Arena (7,041); Normal, IL
January 9, 1993; 11:00 am		at Indiana State	L 60–63	4–6 (1–3)	–	–	–	Hulman Center (4,722); Terre Haute, IN
January 11, 1993; 7:30 pm		Southern Illinois	W 88–74	5–6 (2–3)	26 – VandeGarde	12 – Taylor	7 – Thomas	Redbird Arena (8,987); Normal, IL
January 14, 1993; 7:30 pm		at Wichita State	W 68–66	6–6 (3–3)	18 – Taylor	7 – VandGarde	5 – Wemhoener	Henry Levitt Arena (6,872); Wichita, KS
January 16, 1993; 1:35 pm		at Southwest Missouri State	W 82–73 ^{OT}	7–6 (4–3)	–	–	–	John Q. Hammons Student Center (7,782); Springfield, MO
January 20, 1993*; 7:00 pm		at Loyola–Chicago	W 88–64	8–6	–	–	–	Redbird Arena (7,726); Normal, IL
January 23, 1993; 11:00 am, MVC-TV		Bradley	W 70–68 ^{OT}	9–6 (5–3)	–	–	–	Redbird Arena (9,587); Normal, IL
January 25, 1993; 7:05 pm		at Southern Illinois	L 68–83	9–7 (5–4)	14 – Thomas, Hunter, VandeGarde	6 – Hunter, VandeGarde	3 – VandeGarde	SIU Arena (8,142); Carbondale, IL
January 30, 1993; 7:00 pm		Drake	W 60–57	10–7 (6–4)	–	–	–	Redbird Arena (8,625); Normal, IL
February 2, 1993; 7:30 pm		Indiana State	W 64–48	11–7 (7–4)	–	–	–	Redbird Arena (8,315); Normal, IL
February 6, 1993		at Northern Iowa	W 69–49	12–7 (8–4)	–	–	–	UNI Dome (4,358); Cedar Falls, IA
February 8, 1993; 7:30 pm		Wichita State	W 75–62	13–7 (9–4)	19 – Thomas	5 – VandeGarde	7 – VandeGarde	Redbird Arena (8,801); Normal, IL
February 13, 1993*; 11:00 am, ESPN		Miami (Ohio)	L 55–65	13–8	–	–	–	Redbird Arena (8,260); Normal, IL
February 18, 1993; 7:30 pm		Tulsa	W 72–63	14–8 (10–4)	–	–	–	Redbird Arena (8,670); Normal, IL
February 20, 1993; 7:00 pm		Creighton	W 59–53	15–8 (11–4)	14 – Taylor	6 – Wemhoener	5 – Wemhoener	Redbird Arena (8,872); Normal, IL
February 23, 1993; 7:05 pm, WEEK		at Bradley	L 41–55	15–9 (11–5)	–	–	–	Carver Arena (8,681); Peoria, IL
February 27, 1993		at Drake	W 55–54	16–9 (12–5)	–	–	–	The Knapp Center (7,002); Des Monies, IA
March 1, 1993; 7:30 pm		Northern Iowa	W 71–59	17–9 (13–5)	–	–	–	Redbird Arena (9.081); Normal, IL
Diet Pepsi Missouri Valley Conference {MVC} tournament
March 6, 1993*; 12:00 pm	(1)	vs. (8) Indiana State; Quarterfinal	W 73–68	18–9	25 – VandeGarde	5 – Hunter, VandeGarde	4 – Altadonna	The Arena (5,000); St. Louis, MO
March 7, 1993*; 1:00 pm	(1)	vs. (4) Drake; Semifinal	W 60–59	19–9	18 – Hunter	9 – Hunter	5 – Thomas	The Arena (9,143); St. Louis, MO
March 8, 1993*; 8:30 pm, ESPN	(1)	vs. (2) Southern Illinois; Final	L 59–70	19–10	16 – VandeGarde	9 – VandeGarde	5 – VandeGarde	The Arena (10,877); St. Louis, MO
*Non-conference game. ^{#}Rankings from AP Poll. (#) Tournament seedings in parentheses. All times are in Central Standard Time.
