= 1993–94 Illinois State Redbirds men's basketball team =

American college basketball season

1993–94 Illinois State Redbirds men's basketball
- Conference: Missouri Valley Conference
- Record: 16–11 (12–6 MVC)
- Head coach: Kevin Stallings (1st season)
- Assistant coaches: King Rice; Tom Richardson; Jeff Wulbrun
- Home arena: Redbird Arena

1993–94 Missouri Valley Conference men's basketball standings
	Conf.				Overall
Team	W		L	PCT	W		L	PCT
Tulsa	15	–	3	.833	23	–	8	.742
Bradley	14	–	4	.778	23	–	8	.742
Southern Illinois †	14	–	4	.778	23	–	7	.767
Illinois State	12	–	6	.667	16	–	11	.593
Northern Iowa	10	–	8	.556	16	–	13	.552
Southwest Missouri State	7	–	11	.389	12	–	15	.444
Wichita State	6	–	12	.333	9	–	18	.333
Drake	6	–	12	.333	11	–	16	.407
Creighton	3	–	15	.167	7	–	22	.241
Indiana State	3	–	15	.167	4	–	22	.154
† 1994 MVC tournament winner Rankings from AP Poll

Redbirds wordmark

The 1993–94 Illinois State Redbirds men's basketball team represented Illinois State University during the 1993–94 NCAA Division I men's basketball season. The Redbirds, led by first year head coach Kevin Stallings, played their home games at Redbird Arena and competed as a member of the Missouri Valley Conference.

They finished the season 16–11, 12–6 in conference play to finish in fourth place. They were the number four seed for the Missouri Valley Conference tournament. They were defeated by the University of Northern Iowa in their quarterfinal game.

== Roster ==
1993–94 Illinois State Redbirds men's basketball team
Players
Coaches

Pos.	#	Name	Height	Weight	Year	Hometown
F	54	Charles Barnes	6 ft 5 in (1.96 m)	195 lb (88 kg)	Sr	Chicago, IL
G	23	Greg Hill	5 ft 9 in (1.75 m)	160 lb (73 kg)	Sr	Aurora, IL
C	40	Thomas Hunter	6 ft 6 in (1.98 m)	235 lb (107 kg)	Sr	Nashville, TN
F	21	Scott Taylor	6 ft 8 in (2.03 m)	200 lb (91 kg)	Sr	Newton, MA
F	41	Mike VandeGarde	6 ft 8 in (2.03 m)	210 lb (95 kg)	Sr	Bloomington, MN
G	34	Todd Wemhoener	6 ft 2 in (1.88 m)	186 lb (84 kg)	Sr	Quincy, IL
G	22	Chad Altadonna	6 ft 3 in (1.91 m)	188 lb (85 kg)	Jr	Centralia, IL
G	12	David Cason	6 ft 0 in (1.83 m)	160 lb (73 kg)	Jr	Baltimore, MD
C	43	Brian Kern	6 ft 9 in (2.06 m)	231 lb (105 kg)	Jr	Vandalia, IL
G	25	Antonio Cooper	5 ft 9 in (1.75 m)	160 lb (73 kg)	So	Phoenix, IL
F	33	Jon Litwiller	6 ft 6 in (1.98 m)	210 lb (95 kg)	So	Morton, IL
C	44	Andy Porter	6 ft 7 in (2.01 m)	235 lb (107 kg)	So	Geneseo, IL
C	35	Rob Gibbons (redshirt)	6 ft 10 in (2.08 m)	245 lb (111 kg)	Fr	Rockaway, NJ
F	13	Markku Larkio	6 ft 8 in (2.03 m)	215 lb (98 kg)	Fr	Hyvinkää, Finland
G	32	Jay Phifer	6 ft 2 in (1.88 m)	175 lb (79 kg)	Fr	Troy, MI
F	30	Ryan Weichman	6 ft 8 in (2.03 m)	205 lb (93 kg)	Fr	Flanagan, IL

Head coach

- Kevin Stallings (Purdue)

Assistant coach(es)

- King Rice (North Carolina)
- Tom Richardson (Saint Xavier)
- Jeff Wulbrun (Cal State Fullerton)

Legend

- (C) Team captain
- (S) Suspended
- (I) Ineligible
- (W) Walk-on
- Injured
- Current redshirt

== Schedule ==
Date time, TV	Rank^{#}	Opponent^{#}	Result	Record	High points	High rebounds	High assists	Site (attendance) city, state
Exhibition Season
November 18, 1993*; 7:05 pm		Arkansas Express						Redbird Arena; Normal, IL
November 27, 1993*; 7:05 pm		Slovakia Nationals						Redbird Arena; Normal, IL
Regular Season
December 4, 1993*; 7:30 pm		at Northwestern	L 78–86	0–1	–	–	–	Welsh–Ryan Arena (6,941); Evanston, IL
December 6, 1993*; 7:05 pm		Dayton	W 75–62	1–1	–	–	–	Redbird Arena (6,463); Normal, IL
December 9, 1993*; 6:30 pm		at Butler	L 52–80	1–2	–	–	–	Hinkle Fieldhouse (2,892); Indianapolis, IN
December 11, 1993*; 2:00 pm, WGN		at DePaul	L 72–74	1–3	–	–	–	Rosemont Horizon (7,655); Rosemont, IL
December 19, 1993; 2:05 pm		Northern Iowa	W 74–61	2–3 (1–0)	–	–	–	Redbird Arena (6,022); Normal, IL
December 21, 1993*; 7:05 pm		Evansville	W 73–67	3–3	–	–	–	Redbird Arena (6,360); Normal, IL
December 28, 1993*		vs. Bucknell; Music City Invitational [Semifinal]	W 89–76	4–3	–	–	–	Memorial Gymnasium (6,102); Nashville, TN
December 29, 1993*		at Vanderbilt; Music City Invitational [Final]	L 75–92	4–4	–	–	–	Memorial Gymnasium (15,115); Nashville, TN
January 3, 1994*; 7:05 pm		Colorado	W 76–63	5–4	–	–	–	Redbird Arena (6,066); Normal, IL
January 8, 1994; 11:05 am, MVC-TV		at Southern Illinois	L 64–67	5–5 (1–1)	18 – VandeGarde	11 – Hunter	5 – VandeGarde	SIU Arena (4,018); Carbondale, IL
January 12, 1994; 7:05 pm		at Southwest Missouri State	W 72–57	6–5 (2–1)	–	–	–	John Q. Hammons Student Center (7,986); Springfield, MO
January 15, 1994; 7:05 pm		Indiana State	W 78–52	7–5 (3–1)	–	–	–	Redbird Arena (6,906); Normal, IL
January 19, 1994; 7:05 pm, WEEK		at Bradley	L 79–81 ^{OT}	7–6 (3–2)	–	–	–	Carver Arena (9,751); Peoria, IL
January 22, 1994; 2:05 pm		Drake	W 89–79	8–6 (4–2)	–	–	–	Redbird Arena (8,780); Normal, IL
January 27, 1994; 7:00 pm		at Tulsa	L 68–83	8–7 (4–3)	–	–	–	Tulsa Convention Center (7,002); Tulsa, OK
January 29, 1994; 5:00 pm		at Wichita State	L 85–87 ^{2OT}	8–8 (4–4)	17 – Wemhoener	10 – Hunter, Litwiller	7 – Wemhoener	Henry Levitt Arena (7,229); Wichita, KS
February 2, 1994; 7:05 pm, WEEK		Bradley	W 68–57	9–8 (5–4)	–	–	–	Redbird Arena (9,144); Normal, IL
February 5, 1994; 7:05 pm		at Northern Iowa	L 79–82	9–9 (5–5)	–	–	–	UNI Dome (4,127); Cedar Falls, IA
February 7, 1994; 7:05 pm		Tulsa	W 61–56	10–9 (6–5)	–	–	–	Redbird Arena (8,292); Normal, IL
February 9, 1994; 7:05 pm		Southwest Missouri State	W 62–60	11–9 (7–5)	–	–	–	Redbird Arena (8,588); Normal, IL
February 12, 1994; 1:35 pm		at Creighton	W 92–88 ^{OT}	12–9 (8–5)	27 – VandeGarde	13 – Hunter	10 – Cason	Omaha Civic Auditorium (2,285); Omaha, NE
February 17, 1994; 7:05 pm		Wichita State	W 78–47	13–9 (9–5)	15 – Litwiller	6 – Hunter, Cason	9 – Wemhoener	Redbird Arena (8,028); Normal, IL
February 19, 1994; 11:05 am, MVC-TV		Creighton	W 67–54	14–9 (10–5)	11 – Hunter	5 – Taylor, Litwiller	8 – Wemhoener	Redbird Arena (7,602); Normal, IL
February 21, 1994; 6:30 pm		at Indiana State	W 70–55	15–9 (11–5)	–	–	–	Hulman Center (5,030); Terre Haute, IN
February 24, 1994; 7:05 pm		at Drake	W 72–66	16–9 (12–5)	–	–	–	The Knapp Center (5,370); Des Monies, IA
February 27, 1994; 5:05 pm, ESPN		Southern Illinois	L 73–84	16–10 (12–6)	18 – Wemhoener	10 – VandeGarde	8 – Wemhoener	Redbird Arena (9,878); Normal, IL
Diet Pepsi Missouri Valley Conference {MVC} tournament
March 5, 1994*; 2:35 pm	(4)	vs. (5) Northern Iowa; Quarterfinal	L 70–84	16–11	17 – VandeGarde	7 – Hunter	5 – Cason	St. Louis Arena (6,829); St. Louis, MO
*Non-conference game. ^{#}Rankings from AP Poll. (#) Tournament seedings in parentheses. All times are in Central Standard Time.
