= Bryan Mullins =

American basketball coach (born 1987)

DePaul Blue Demons
- Title: Assistant coach
- League: Big East Conference

Personal information
- Born: January 13, 1987 (age 39) Hinsdale, Illinois, U.S.
- Listed height: 6 ft 1 in (1.85 m)
- Listed weight: 190 lb (86 kg)

Career information
- High school: Downers Grove (Downers Grove, Illinois)
- College: Southern Illinois (2005–2009)
- NBA draft: 2009: undrafted
- Playing career: 2009–2013
- Position: Point guard
- Number: 11, 10

Career history

Playing
- 2009–2010: JL Bourg-en-Bresse
- 2010–2013: Châlons-Reims

Coaching
- 2013–2015: Loyola Chicago (DBO)
- 2015–2018: Loyola Chicago (assistant)
- 2018–2019: Loyola Chicago (associate HC)
- 2019–2024: Southern Illinois
- 2024–present: DePaul (assistant)

Career highlights
- As player: 2× Missouri Valley Conference Defensive Player of the Year (2008, 2009); Second team All-MVC (2008); 4× MVC All-Defensive Team (2006–2009); MVC Freshman of the Year (2006); MVC All-Freshman Team (2006); MVC All-Newcomer Team (2006)

Bryan Mullins (born January 13, 1987) is an American college basketball coach and former player. He was head coach of the Southern Illinois Salukis men's basketball team for five seasons from 2019 to 2024. He has been an assistant on Chris Holtmann's staff at DePaul University since April 1, 2024.

== Playing career ==
Mullins was a four-year letterwinner at Southern Illinois for coach Chris Lowery where he was part of the Salukis' Sweet 16 run in the 2007 NCAA tournament. He was also a two-time Academic All-American at the school, as well as a two-time Missouri Valley Conference Defensive Player of the Year. Following graduation, Mullins played four years of professional basketball in France.

== Coaching career ==
After retiring from professional basketball, Mullins joined Porter Moser's staff at Loyola, rising the ranks from director of basketball operations up to associate head coach. He was on staff during Loyola's historic Final Four run at the 2018 NCAA tournament.

On March 20, 2019, Mullins was named the 14th head coach in Southern Illinois history, replacing Barry Hinson. In his first season as Salukis head coach, he led the team to a 10-8 conference record including a seven-game winning streak and finished 5th despite the team being picked last in the conference before the season. He was picked 2nd for Missouri Valley Conference coach of the year trailing Northern Iowa's Ben Jacobson. Mullins was dismissed as Salukis head coach on March 8, 2024 after five seasons and an 86–68 overall record. He was succeeded by Scott Nagy on March 28.

Twenty-four days after his departure from SIU Carbondale, he has named an assistant on Chris Holtmann's staff at DePaul University on April 1, 2024.

== Personal life ==
Mullins comes from a basketball family. His father Mike is the founder of the Illinois Wolves AAU program, while his older brother Brendan is a former college basketball player at Saint Michael's College and assistant basketball coach at Southern Illinois Salukis.

== Head coaching record ==
Record table
Season	Team	Overall	Conference	Standing	Postseason
Southern Illinois Salukis (Missouri Valley Conference) (2019–2024)
2019–20	Southern Illinois	16–16	10–8	5th	
2020–21	Southern Illinois	12–14	5–13	9th	
2021–22	Southern Illinois	16–15	9–9	6th	
2022–23	Southern Illinois	23–10	14–6	T–3rd	
2023–24	Southern Illinois	19–13	11–9	6th	
Southern Illinois:		86–68 (.558)	49–45 (.521)		
Total:		86–68 (.558)			
