= 1993–94 Southern Illinois Salukis men's basketball team =

American college basketball season

1993–94 Southern Illinois Salukis men's basketball

MVC tournament champion

NCAA tournament
- Conference: Missouri Valley Conference
- Record: 23–7 (14–4 MVC)
- Head coach: Rich Herrin (9th season)
- Home arena: SIU Arena

1993–94 Missouri Valley Conference men's basketball standings
	Conf.				Overall
Team	W		L	PCT	W		L	PCT
Tulsa	15	–	3	.833	23	–	8	.742
Bradley	14	–	4	.778	23	–	8	.742
Southern Illinois †	14	–	4	.778	23	–	7	.767
Illinois State	12	–	6	.667	16	–	11	.593
Northern Iowa	10	–	8	.556	16	–	13	.552
Southwest Missouri State	7	–	11	.389	12	–	15	.444
Wichita State	6	–	12	.333	9	–	18	.333
Drake	6	–	12	.333	11	–	16	.407
Creighton	3	–	15	.167	7	–	22	.241
Indiana State	3	–	15	.167	4	–	22	.154
† 1994 MVC tournament winner Rankings from AP Poll

The 1993–94 Southern Illinois Salukis men's basketball team represented Southern Illinois University Carbondale during the 1993–94 NCAA Division I men's basketball season. The Salukis were led by ninth-year head coach Rich Herrin and played their home games at the SIU Arena in Carbondale, Illinois as members of the Missouri Valley Conference. They finished the season 23–7, 14–4 in MVC play to finish in second place. The Salukis won the MVC tournament to receive an automatic bid to the NCAA tournament as No. 11 seed in the West region. The Salukis fell to No. 6 seed Minnesota in the opening round.

== Roster ==
1993–94 Southern Illinois Salukis men's basketball team
Players
Coaches

Pos.	#	Name	Height	Weight	Year	Previous school	Hometown
G		Chris Lowery	—	—	Sr
F		Marcus Timmons	6 ft 8 in (2.03 m)	215 lb (98 kg)	Jr		Sikeston, Missouri
F	43	Chris Carr	6 ft 6 in (1.98 m)	215 lb (98 kg)	So		Ironton, Missouri

Head coach

- Rich Herrin

Assistant coach(es)

Legend

- (C) Team captain
- (S) Suspended
- (I) Ineligible
- (W) Walk-on
- Injured
- Current redshirt

Roster

== Schedule and results ==
Date time, TV	Rank^{#}	Opponent^{#}	Result	Record	Site (attendance) city, state
Regular season
Nov 27, 1993*		Tampa	W 114–64	1–0	SIU Arena; Carbondale, Illinois
Dec 4, 1993*		at Evansville	W 74–69	2–0	Roberts Municipal Stadium; Evansville, Indiana
Dec 8, 1993*		Ole Miss	W 81–60	3–0	SIU Arena; Carbondale, Illinois
Dec 11, 1993*		Austin Peay	W 94–86 ^{2OT}	4–0	SIU Arena; Carbondale, Illinois
Dec 16, 1993*		Southeast Missouri State	W 82–54	5–0	SIU Arena; Carbondale, Illinois
Dec 22, 1993		at Wichita State	W 72–64	6–0 (1–0)	Levitt Arena; Wichita, Kansas
Dec 30, 1993*		at Saint Louis	L 87–100	6–1	St. Louis Arena (17,117); St. Louis, Missouri
Jan 5, 1994*		Missouri	L 56–72	6–2	SIU Arena; Carbondale, Illinois
Jan 8, 1994		Illinois State	W 67–64	7–2 (2–0)	SIU Arena; Carbondale, Illinois
Jan 10, 1994		at Drake	W 86–76	8–2 (3–0)	Knapp Center; Des Moines, Iowa
Jan 15, 1994		Bradley	W 72–66	9–2 (4–0)	SIU Arena; Carbondale, Illinois
Jan 17, 1994		at Creighton	W 81–67	10–2 (5–0)	Omaha Civic Auditorium; Omaha, Nebraska
Jan 20, 1994		Tulsa	L 81–86	10–3 (5–1)	SIU Arena; Carbondale, Illinois
Jan 22, 1994		Wichita State	W 95–79	11–3 (6–1)	SIU Arena; Carbondale, Illinois
Jan 25, 1994		at Indiana State	W 72–69	12–3 (7–1)	Hulman Center; Terre Haute, Indiana
Jan 29, 1994		at Bradley	L 62–68	12–4 (7–2)	Carver Arena; Peoria, Illinois
Jan 31, 1994		Creighton	W 97–64	13–4 (8–2)	SIU Arena; Carbondale, Illinois
Feb 3, 1994		Northern Iowa	W 89–68	14–4 (9–2)	SIU Arena; Carbondale, Illinois
Feb 5, 1994		at SW Missouri State	L 64–66	14–5 (9–3)	Hammons Student Center; Springfield, Missouri
Feb 9, 1994		Indiana State	W 89–69	15–5 (10–3)	SIU Arena; Carbondale, Illinois
Feb 12, 1994		at Tulsa	L 70–88	15–6 (10–4)	Tulsa Convention Center; Tulsa, Oklahoma
Feb 14, 1994*		at Oral Roberts	W 92–76	16–6	Mabee Center; Tulsa, Oklahoma
Feb 16, 1994		SW Missouri State	W 79–56	17–6 (11–4)	SIU Arena; Carbondale, Illinois
Feb 19, 1994		Drake	W 73–71	18–6 (12–4)	SIU Arena; Carbondale, Illinois
Feb 23, 1994		at Northern Iowa	W 97–94	19–6 (13–4)	UNI-Dome; Cedar Falls, Iowa
Feb 27, 1994		at Illinois State	W 84–73	20–6 (14–4)	Redbird Arena; Normal, Illinois
Missouri Valley tournament
Mar 5, 1994*		vs. SW Missouri State; Quarterfinals	W 52–50	21–6	St. Louis Arena; St. Louis, Missouri
Mar 6, 1994*		vs. Bradley; Semifinals	W 72–59	22–6	St. Louis Arena; St. Louis, Missouri
Mar 7, 1994*		vs. Northern Iowa; Championship game	W 77–74	23–6	St. Louis Arena; St. Louis, Missouri
NCAA tournament
Mar 18, 1994*	(11 W)	vs. (6 W) No. 23 Minnesota; First round	L 60–74	23–7	ARCO Arena; Sacramento, California
*Non-conference game. ^{#}Rankings from AP poll. (#) Tournament seedings in parentheses. W=West. All times are in Central Time.
