= Gary Collier (basketball) =

American basketball player, sportsperson and basketball coach

Personal information
- Born: October 8, 1971 (age 55) Fort Worth, Texas, U.S.
- Listed height: 6 ft 4 in (1.93 m)
- Listed weight: 195 lb (88 kg)

Career information
- High school: Dunbar (Fort Worth, Texas)
- College: Tulsa (1990–1994)
- NBA draft: 1994: 2nd round, 42nd overall pick
- Drafted by: Cleveland Cavaliers
- Playing career: 1994–2004
- Position: Shooting guard / small forward

Career history
- 1994–1995: Quad City Thunder
- 1995–1997: Racing Antwerpen
- 1997–1998: Oostende
- 1998–1999: Rhöndorf
- 1999–2000: Skyliners Frankfurt
- 2000–2003: Dexia Mons-Hainaut
- 2003–2004: Racing Paris

Career highlights
- German Cup winner (2000); MVC Player of the Year (1994)
- Stats at Basketball Reference

Gary Collier (born October 8, 1971) is an American former college and professional basketball player who attended the University of Tulsa.

Collier played four seasons for the Golden Hurricane and was named the 1994 MVC player of the year. He led the 1994 NCAA Tournament in scoring average with 31.3 points per game.

Collier was drafted by the Cleveland Cavaliers in the 2nd round of the 1994 NBA draft; however, he never played in the NBA. He played the 1994–95 season with the Quad City Thunder in the Continental Basketball Association . Collier then took his game in Europe. He played his first two seasons for the Antwerp Diamond Giants. He then joined the Basketball Club Oostende, also in Belgium.

Collier played 1998–99 for Rhöndorf of the Basketball Bundesliga (BBL). After Dragons Rhöndorf sold their license to Frankfurt, he did play the next season for Frankfurt Skyliners. Collier then returned to Belgium, where he spent the following three seasons with Telindus Mons Hainaut. He averaged 17.4 points for Telindus Mons in the final Korać Cup in 2002. He played a final season in Europe with Paris Basket Racing, 2003–2004.

Following his playing career, Collier coached the boys' basketball coach at Arlington Heights High School in Fort Worth for four years leading them to the state semifinals in 2011. Collier is currently the boys' basketball coach at Crowley High School in the Tarrant County area.
