= Rich Herrin =

American basketball player (1933–2020)

Biographical details
- Born: April 6, 1933; Bridgeport, Illinois, U.S.
- Died: December 25, 2020 (aged 87)

Coaching career (HC unless noted)
- 1985–1998: Southern Illinois

Rich Herrin (April 6, 1933 – December 25, 2020) was a top collegiate basketball coach in America. From 2012 to 2014, he coached collegiately at Morthland College, as well as the Southern Illinois University Salukis men's basketball team from 1985 to 1998. He was one of the most successful high school basketball coaches in Illinois history, at Benton High School (Rangers), where he coached numerous renowned players, including former NBA and Olympic star, Doug Collins as well as former Georgia Tech great, Richard Yunkus. After SIU, he coached at Marion for some time before retiring in 2007.

He returned to coaching again in 2012 to start up the Morthland College men's basketball program.

Herrin was the son of a Methodist minister in Bridgeport, Illinois. He played high school basketball on multiple weeknights except Wednesdays, the evening many Christian churches hold midweek services. Rich won 7 varsity letters in high school and 11 letters at McKendree College in Lebanon.

Rich had four undefeated teams in regular season play – 1966, 1967, 1971 and 1975. His Benton teams won 8 South Seven conference championships and finished second twice. Three Ranger teams advanced to the Elite 8 and four others lost in a photo finish.

Herrin died on December 25, 2020, at age 87.

== College head coaching record ==
Record table
Season	Coach	Overall	Conference	Standing	Postseason
SIU Salukis (Missouri Valley Conference) (1985–1998)
1985–86	SIU Salukis	8–20	4–12	T-8th	
1986–87	SIU Salukis	12–17	5–9	6th	
1987–88	SIU Salukis	12–16	6–8	T-4th	
1988–89	SIU Salukis	20–14	6–8	T-5th	NIT 1st Round
1989–90	SIU Salukis	26–8	10–4	1st	NIT 1st Round
1990–91	SIU Salukis	18–14	9–7	T-4th	NIT Quarterfinals
1991–92	SIU Salukis	22–8	14–4	T-1st	NIT 1st Round
1992–93	SIU Salukis	23–10	12–6	2nd	NCAA 1st Round
1993–94	SIU Salukis	23–7	14–4	T-2nd	NCAA 1st Round
1994–95	SIU Salukis	23–9	13–5	T-2nd	NCAA 1st Round
1995–96	SIU Salukis	11–18	4–14	T-10th	
1996–97	SIU Salukis	13–17	6–12	9th	
1997–98	SIU Salukis	14–16	8–10	8th	
SIU Salukis:		225–174	111–103		
Morthland College Patriots (NCCAA Mid-east II) (2012–present)
2012–13	Morthland Patriots	6–20			
2013–14	Morthland Patriots	13–10			
Morthland Patriots:		19–30			
Total:		244–204			
National champion Postseason invitational champion Conference regular season champion Conference regular season and conference tournament champion Division regular season champion Division regular season and conference tournament champion Conference tournament champion
