= Morthland College =

- Motto: Lux Beneficium Veritas
- Motto in English: Light, Service, and Truth
- Type: Private
- Active: 2009–2018
- Religious affiliation: Christian
- President: Tim Morthland
- Students: c. 300
- Undergraduates: c. 300
- Location: West Frankfort, Illinois, U.S. 37°53′48.4″N 88°55′35.5″W
- Campus: Small city
- Colors: Forrest green, crimson
- Nickname: Patriots
- Sporting affiliations: NCCAA (D-I Mid-East),
- Website: www.morthland.edu/mc

Morthland College (MC) was a private Christian liberal arts college from 2009 to 2018 in West Frankfort, Illinois, United States. The Illinois Board of Higher Education serves as the custodian of records for the college following the its closure.

The school was founded in 2009 by Tim Morthland and opened in 2011 as a small, co-educational liberal arts college. The college had an initial enrollment of forty students and 300-400 students prior to its closure in 2018. Morthland College athletic teams were known as the Patriots. The college was a member of the NCCAA in the Division-I Mid-East Region.

In January 2017, the United States Department of Education and state investigators began investigating the college for financial irregularities. As a result, the college closed in 2018.

== History ==
Morthland College was founded by Tim Morthland in 2009. Morthland pioneered the institution of a Christian college in the region, founded on the principles of scholarship and conservative Christianity. He began gathering support for the school and on March 29, 2009, seventy community members met in West Frankfort to discuss the subject of building a Christian college in southern Illinois. In October 2009, the institution was incorporated as a non-profit organization and it was certified by the IRS in March 2010 with 501C3 status. Dr. Morthland and the board of trustees appointed 32 faculty members who embrace the "Christian" values of the college.

On October 5, 2010, Morthland College when the college was given approval by the Illinois Board of Higher Education (IBHE) to operate. As part of the IBHE approval process, the college received a thorough review that included: site visits and meetings, and analysis of the course catalog and offerings. The college began recruiting its first students to begin the following fall semester. Morthland set an enrollment cap of 100 students for the first year but a five-year goal of 500 students.

The college opened offices in downtown West Frankfort, planned to hold classes at the community high school, library and park district buildings. Morthland College initial programs of study included the BA in Biblical Studies and the BA in Classics.

Morthland held opening ceremonies on August 15, 2011. The ceremony marked the official opening of the college and included speeches and prayers from Dr. Morthland, faculty, and guest speakers. Classes began the next day on August 16, 2011, with 11 full and part-time students enrolled in two degrees programs, a Bachelor of Arts in Classics or a Bachelor of Arts in Biblical Studies. The college utilized two classrooms and a computer lab in its administration building on Main Street in West Frankfort.

In October 2011, the college received approval from the IBHE to offer a BA in Business Administration to begin in the 2012–13 academic year. In early 2012, Morthland announced further expansion, adding an athletic department with five initial sports.

In the summer to 2012, the college continued expansion efforts and purchased the historic former Elks building located at Oak and Emma Streets in West Frankfort. The four-story, 15,000-square-foot (1,400 m^{2}) building was built in 1923; it housed administrative offices, faculty offices, chapel, student commons, and a kitchen and student area. The college's enrollment increased to over forty students in the fall semester, up from the original 11 in the first year of the college.

In April 2013, Morthland College was awarded Candidate status by the Transnational Association of Christian Colleges and Schools (TRACS). TRACS is recognized by the United States Department of Education (USDE), the Council for Higher Education Accreditation (CHEA) and the International Network for Quality Assurance Agencies in Higher Education (INQAAHE). One year later, in April 2014, Morthland College was awarded full accreditation by TRACS.

By 2017, financial issues began to affect the college and evidence of financial mismanagement became publicly known. Glenn Poshard, the college's second President, suddenly resigned and was replaced by Dr. Morthland. In resigning he made a reference to the problems at the college: "I believe strongly in the vision and the mission of Morthland College and the opportunity it provides in offering students a faith-based, Christian education, however there are serious issues — both personnel and financial — of which I was not notified when I began as president, and which, I concluded, could only be resolved by an authority other than myself.” Subsequently, financial documents were leaked which indicated a possible financial crisis at the college, including over $700,000 ($919,427 in 2025) in unpaid taxes and $80,000 ($105,077 in 2025) owed to a contractor. In September it was reported that Morthland College was being investigated by state, federal agencies and that the college had been fined $2,000,000 ($2.63 million in 2025) by the Department of Education for an alleged "breach of fiduciary duty." The Department of Education had also revoked the school's ability to access federal student aid funds. The same report also indicated that the Illinois Board of Higher Education was conducting an official investigation into the financial irregularities, and that the IBHE has received communication from Transnational Association of Christian Colleges and Schools, Morthland's accreditor, indicating that it, too, would be conducting its own review, investigating "possible issues of non-compliance with TRACS accreditation standards." The letter from IBHE states that according to the Illinois Amended Code 1030, notification of investigation is the first step in what could lead to the revocation of a college's certificate of approval to operate.

The Illinois Board of Higher Education serves as the custodian of records for the college following the its closure.

== Academics ==
Morthland College offered the Bachelor of Arts degree. Most courses were offered in the traditional classroom-based learning; however, Morthland College did offer several classes online.

Morthland College was approved to operate with the Illinois Board of Higher Education (IBHE) in 2011 and received full accreditation by the Transnational Association of Christian Colleges and Schools (TRACS) in April 2014. TRACS is recognized by the United States Department of Education (USDE), the Council for Higher Education Accreditation (CHEA) and the International Network for Quality Assurance Agencies in Higher Education (INQAAHE).

In the fall of 2013, Morthland College was approved by the United States Department of Education to disburse Pell Grants, Direct, and Indirect Student Loans. The college also disbursed the GI Bill through the state of Illinois.

The college expanded its facilities to include Washington Hall, Coleman-Rhoads Hall, and Whitfield Hall in its first four years of operation. In 2015 a private investor, Brad McMillin Inc., constructed Mount Vernon House student dorm that could house 98 students.

Of the 14 college graduates this year—one of whom actually graduated in December but is coming back to walk in the ceremony—three are classics majors and the remaining 11 have earned business administration degrees of which 2 were online. In 2012 the college officially launched their online programs.

Two of the students attended Morthland College since that first year, while the rest transferred in, some thanks to an articulation agreement with MidContinent University when it shut down last year.

== Athletics ==
On May 17, 2017, school trustees voted to shutter the athletic program in its entirety.
