= Ashraf Amaya =

American basketball player

Personal information
- Born: November 23, 1971 (age 54) Chicago, Illinois, U.S.
- Listed height: 6 ft 8 in (2.03 m)
- Listed weight: 230 lb (104 kg)

Career information
- High school: Walther Lutheran (Melrose Park, Illinois)
- College: Southern Illinois (1989–1993)
- NBA draft: 1993: undrafted
- Playing career: 1993–2004
- Position: Power forward
- Number: 18, 50

Career history
- 1993: Kolejliler
- 1993–1994: Quad City Thunder
- 1994: Fort Wayne Fury
- 1994–1995: Ampelokipoi
- 1995–1996: Vancouver Grizzlies
- 1996–1997: Washington Bullets
- 1997–1998: Idaho Stampede
- 1998–1999: Ducato Siena
- 1999–2002: Maroussi
- 2003–2004: Ülkerspor
- 2004: Dakota Wizards
- 2004: Tenerife

Career highlights
- FIBA Saporta Cup champion (2001); 2× Greek League All-Star (1999, 2001); CBA champion (2004); MVC Player of the Year (1992); 3× First-team All-MVC (1991–1993); 2× MVC Defensive Player of the Year (1992, 1993); 3× MVC All-Defensive team (1991–1993); MVC Rookie of the Year (1990); MVC All-Freshman team (1990); MVC tournament MVP (1993)
- Stats at NBA.com
- Stats at Basketball Reference

Ashraf Omar Amaya (born November 23, 1971) is an American former professional basketball player.

== High school career ==
Amaya attended Oak Park and River Forest High School for his freshman year, but he transferred to Walther Lutheran High School to finish his high school career. While at Walther, Amaya led the Broncos to a 3rd-place finish in the 1988 Illinois High School Association playoffs. Amaya's number 50 jersey is retired at Walther.

== College career ==
Amaya played college basketball for the Southern Illinois University.

== Professional career ==
After college, Amaya then would appear for the Vancouver Grizzlies in their inaugural season (1995–96) and Washington Bullets (1996–97) in the NBA, playing a total of 85 games in those two seasons.

Amaya last played professionally for the Apollon Patras club in Greece, in the Greek Basket League in 2004. He also played for the Dakota Wizards of the NBDL, Alpella Istanbul in Turkey (Turkish League), the Idaho Stampede in the CBA, and Maroussi Athens in Greece, with whom he won the FIBA Saporta Cup in the 2000–01 season.

== National team career ==
Amaya also played for the senior US national team at the 1998 FIBA World Championship, winning the bronze medal.
