= Southern Illinois Salukis men's basketball =

Men's basketball team

2026–27 Southern Illinois Salukis men's basketball team
- University: Southern Illinois University
- Head coach: Scott Nagy (3rd season)
- Location: Carbondale, Illinois
- Arena: Banterra Center (capacity: 8,284)
- Conference: Missouri Valley
- Nickname: Salukis
- Colors: Maroon and white

NCAA Division I tournament runner-up
- 1965*, 1966*
Other NCAA Division I tournament results
Final Four	1962*, 1963*, 1965*, 1966*
Elite Eight	1962*, 1963*, 1965*, 1966*
Sweet Sixteen	1961*, 1962*, 1963*, 1964*, 1965*, 1966*, 1977, 2002, 2007
Appearances	1959*, 1961*, 1962*, 1963*, 1964*, 1965*, 1966*, 1977, 1993, 1994, 1995, 2002, 2003, 2004, 2005, 2006, 2007

NAIA tournament champions
- 1946
Other NAIA tournament results
Semifinals	1945, 1946
Quarterfinals	1945, 1946
Appearances	1945, 1946, 1947, 1948, 1960

Conference tournament champions
- 1977, 1993, 1994, 1995, 2006

Conference regular-season champions
- MVC - 1977, 1990, 1992, 2002, 2003, 2004, 2005, 2007; IIAC - 1946, 1947, 1948, 1960, 1961, 1962

NIT champions
- 1967

Uniforms
Home	Away
- * at Division II level

The Southern Illinois Salukis men's basketball team represents Southern Illinois University Carbondale in Carbondale, Illinois. The Salukis compete in the NCAA Division 1, and they play their home games at Banterra Center. As of March 2024, former South Dakota State and Wright State coach, Scott Nagy, has become the newest head coach of the Southern Illinois basketball program. Southern Illinois has appeared 10 times in the NCAA Division I men's basketball tournament, most recently in 2007.

== History ==
Prior to joining the NCAA, the Salukis competed in the NAIA men's basketball. Appearing five times, with a combined tournament record of 9 wins and 4 losses. Most notable tournament appearances came in 1945, in which the Salukis finished third, and then the following year in the 1946 tournament where the Salukis were NAIA national champions. The Salukis would not place again in the following three tournament appearances in 1947, 1948, 1960.

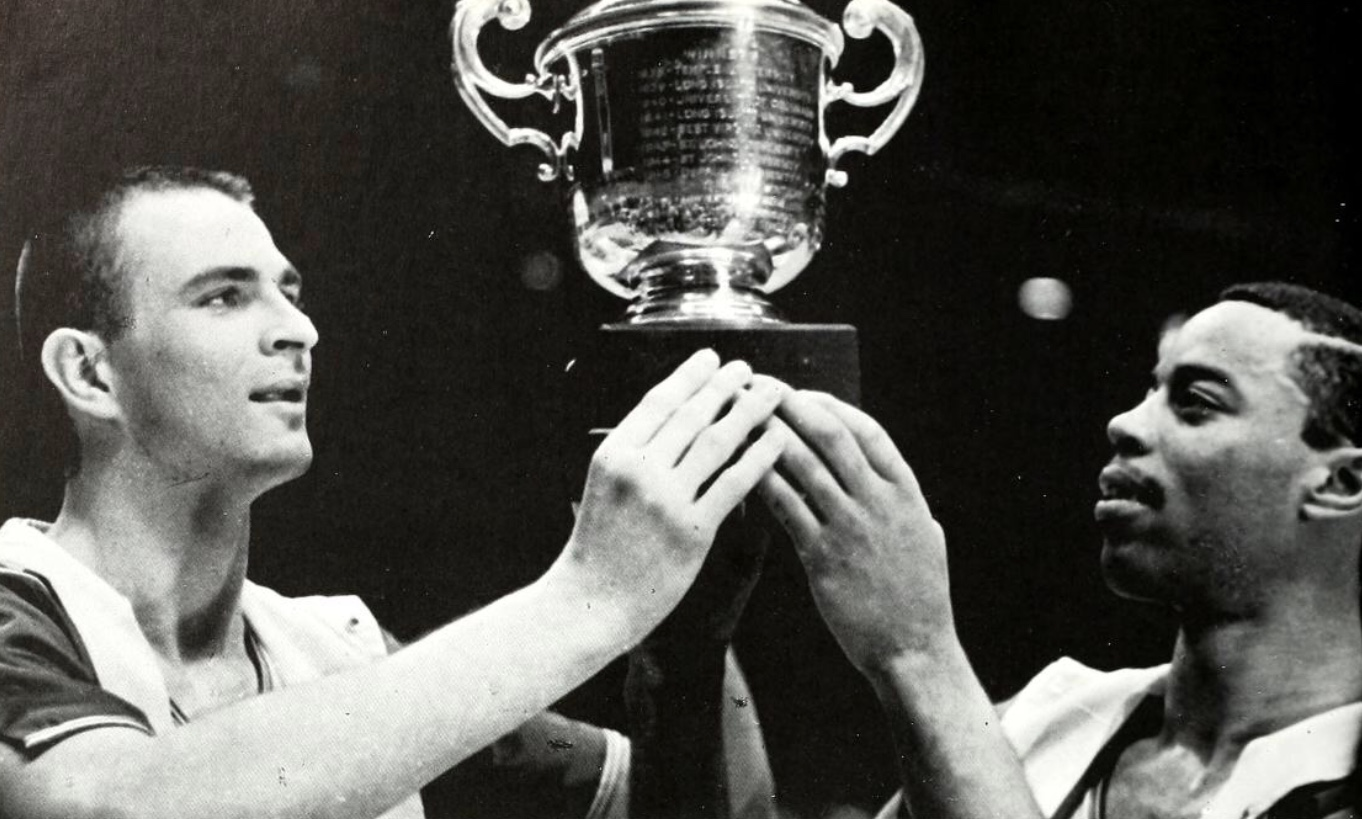
Captains Ralph Johnson and Walt Frazier hoist the 1967 NIT championship trophy.

In 1967, SIU, led by guard Walt Frazier, who went on to be named one of the 50 Greatest Players in NBA History, won the National Invitation Tournament under coach Jack Hartman. At the time, the tournament was considered much more prestigious than it is today. The Salukis were in their final season members of the College Division (now Division II) and became the only non-Division I/University Division team to win the NIT. After the NCAA began operating the NIT in 2006, non-Division I teams were no longer eligible to participate. Frazier was named Most Valuable Player of the 1967 NIT.

In 1977, future NBA player Mike Glenn led the Salukis to the NCAA Division I Tournament Sweet Sixteen.

From 1993 to 1995, SIU advanced to three straight NCAA Division I Tournaments. Prior to that, the Salukis participated in the National Invitation Tournament for four consecutive years from 1989 to 1992.

Part of the SIU Saluki men's basketball team's 2003 season was chronicled in MTV's True Life: I Am A College Baller.

The Saluki men's basketball team garnered national attention by advancing to the Sweet Sixteen in 2002 and 2007.

In the 2006–2007 season, the Salukis, coached by Chris Lowery, reached their highest ranking in the AP Coaches Poll and the ESPN/USA Today Poll with a position of #11, before dropping to #14 after losing the MVC to Creighton prior to entering the NCAA tournament.

After achieving success at SIU, former coaches Bruce Weber and Matt Painter accepted head coaching positions at schools in the Big Ten. Weber took over at Illinois in 2003 and Painter – an alumnus of and former basketball player at Purdue University – accepted the Boilermakers' offer to become top assistant and designated successor to Gene Keady in 2004, becoming head coach in March 2005.

Prior to the 2018–19 season, the Salukis became the first NCAA men's basketball team to win a completed game against the Cuban national team during a pre-season visit to the country.

Nine Salukis have gone on to play in the NBA:

Chico Vaughn - St. Louis Hawks (1963–66), Detroit Pistons (1966-67)
Walt Frazier - New York Knicks (1968–77), Cleveland Cavaliers (1978–80)
Dick Garrett - Los Angeles Lakers (1970), Buffalo Braves (1971-73), New York Knicks (1974), Milwaukee Bucks (1974)
Nate Hawthorne - Los Angeles Lakers (1974), Phoenix Suns (1975–76)
Joe C. Meriweather - Houston Rockets (1976), Atlanta Hawks (1977), New Orleans Jazz (1978–79), Kansas City Kings (1981–85)
Mike Glenn - Buffalo Braves (1978), New York Knicks (1979-81), Atlanta Hawks (1982–85), Milwaukee Bucks (1986-87)
Ashraf Amaya - Vancouver Grizzlies (1996), Washington Bullets (1997)
Chris Carr - Phoenix Suns (1996), Minnesota Timberwolves (1997–98), New Jersey Nets (1999), Golden State Warriors (2000), Chicago Bulls (2000), Boston Celtics (2001)
Troy Hudson - Utah Jazz (1998), Los Angeles Clippers (1999-2000), Orlando Magic (2001-02), Minnesota Timberwolves (2003–07), Golden State Warriors (2007–08)

== Yearly records ==
=== Division I ===
Record table
Season	Coach	Overall	Conference	Standing	Postseason
Jack Hartman (Division I Independent) (1966–1970)
1966–67	Jack Hartman	20–2			
1967–68	Jack Hartman	13–11			
1968–69	Jack Hartman	16–8			
1969–70	Jack Hartman	13–10			
Jack Hartman:		66–31			
Paul Lambert (Midwestern Conference) (1970–1972)
1970–71	Paul Lambert	13–10			
1971–72	Paul Lambert	10–16			
Paul Lambert (Division I Independent) (1972–1975)
1972–73	Paul Lambert	11–15			
1973–74	Paul Lambert	19–7			
1974–75 (Note: Joined the Missouri Valley Conference in 1974–75 as a provisional member, before beginning conference play in 1975–76.)	Paul Lambert	18–9			NIT 1st Round
Paul Lambert (Missouri Valley Conference) (1975–1978)
1975–76	Paul Lambert	16–10	9–3	2nd	
1976–77	Paul Lambert	22–7	8–4	T–1st	NCAA regional semi-Finals
1977–78	Paul Lambert	17–10	11–5	3rd	
Paul Lambert:		126–84	28–12		
Joe Gottfried (Missouri Valley Conference) (1978–1981)
1978–79	Joe Gottfried	15–13	8–8	T–3rd	
1979–80	Joe Gottfried	9–17	5–11	8th	
1980–81	Joe Gottfried	7–20	0–16	9th	
Joe Gottfried:		31–50	13–35		
Allen Van Winkle (Missouri Valley Conference) (1981–1985)
1981–82	Allen Van Winkle	11–16	7–9	7th	
1982–83	Allen Van Winkle	9–19	5–13	8th	
1983–84	Allen Van Winkle	15–13	7–9	T–5th	
1984–85	Allen Van Winkle	14–14	6–10	T–6th	
Allen Van Winkle:		49–62	25–41		
Rich Herrin (Missouri Valley Conference) (1985–1998)
1985–86	Rich Herrin	8–20	4–12	T–8th	
1986–87	Rich Herrin	12–17	5–9	6th	
1987–88	Rich Herrin	12–16	6–8	T–4th	
1988–89	Rich Herrin	20–14	6–8	T–5th	NIT 1st Round
1989–90	Rich Herrin	26–8	10–4	1st	NIT 1st Round
1990–91	Rich Herrin	18–14	9–7	T–4th	NIT Quarterfinals
1991–92	Rich Herrin	22–8	14–4	T–1st	NIT 1st Round
1992–93	Rich Herrin	23–10	12–6	2nd	NCAA 1st Round
1993–94	Rich Herrin	23–7	14–4	T–2nd	NCAA 1st Round
1994–95	Rich Herrin	23–9	13–5	T–2nd	NCAA 1st Round
1995–96	Rich Herrin	11–18	4–14	T–10th	
1996–97	Rich Herrin	13–17	6–12	9th	
1997–98	Rich Herrin	14–16	8–10	8th	
Rich Herrin:		225–174	111–103		
Bruce Weber (Missouri Valley Conference) (1998–2003)
1998–99	Bruce Weber	15–12	10–8	T–5th	
1999–2000	Bruce Weber	20–13	12–6	3rd	NIT 2nd Round
2000–01	Bruce Weber	16–14	10–8	T–4th	
2001–02	Bruce Weber	28–8	14–4	T–1st	NCAA Sweet 16
2002–03	Bruce Weber	24–7	16–2	1st	NCAA 1st Round
Bruce Weber:		103–54	62–28		
Matt Painter (Missouri Valley Conference) (2003–2004)
2003–04	Matt Painter	25–5	17–1	1st	NCAA 1st Round
Matt Painter:		25–5	17–1		
Chris Lowery (Missouri Valley Conference) (2004–2012)
2004–05	Chris Lowery	27–8	15–3	1st	NCAA 2nd Round
2005–06	Chris Lowery	22–11	12–6	2nd	NCAA 1st Round
2006–07	Chris Lowery	29–7	15–3	1st	NCAA Sweet 16
2007–08	Chris Lowery	18–15	11–7	3rd	NIT 2nd Round
2008–09	Chris Lowery	13–18	8–10	5th	
2009–10	Chris Lowery	15–15	6–12	9th	
2010–11	Chris Lowery	13–19	5–13	8th	
2011–12	Chris Lowery	8–23	5–13	9th	
Chris Lowery:		145–115	77–67		
Barry Hinson (Missouri Valley Conference) (2012–2019)
2012–13	Barry Hinson	14–17	6–12	10th	
2013–14	Barry Hinson	14–19	9–9	T–4th	
2014–15	Barry Hinson	12–21	4–14	9th	
2015–16	Barry Hinson	22–10	11–7	T–4th	
2016–17	Barry Hinson	17–16	9–9	T–3rd	
2017–18	Barry Hinson	20–13	11–7	2nd	
2018–19	Barry Hinson	17–14	10–8	T–3rd	
Barry Hinson:		116–110	60–66		
Bryan Mullins (Missouri Valley Conference) (2019–2024)
2019–20	Bryan Mullins	16–16	10–8	5th	
2020–21	Bryan Mullins	12–14	5–13	9th	
2021–22	Bryan Mullins	16–15	9–9	6th	
2022–23	Bryan Mullins	23–10	14–6	T–3rd	
2023–24	Bryan Mullins	19–13	11–9	6th	
Bryan Mullins:		86–68	49–45		
Scott Nagy (Missouri Valley Conference) (2024–present)
2024–25	Scott Nagy	14–19	8–12	8th	
2025–26	Scott Nagy	16–16	10–10	8th	
Scott Nagy:		30–35	18–22		
Total:		978–788			
National champion Postseason invitational champion Conference regular season champion Conference regular season and conference tournament champion Division regular season champion Division regular season and conference tournament champion Conference tournament champion

== Postseason results ==
=== NCAA Division I tournament results ===
The Salukis have appeared in the NCAA Division I Tournament ten times. Their combined record is 6–10.

Year	Seed	Round	Opponent	Result
1977		Quarterfinals; Sweet Sixteen	Arizona; Wake Forest	W 81–77; L 81–86
1993	#14	First Round	#3 Duke	L 70–105
1994	#11	First Round	#6 Minnesota	L 60–74
1995	#10	First Round	#7 Syracuse	L 92–96
2002	#11	First Round; Second Round; Sweet Sixteen	#6 Texas Tech #3 Georgia #2 Connecticut	W 76–68; W 77–75; L 59–71
2003	#11	First Round	#6 Missouri	L 71–72
2004	#9	First Round	#8 Alabama	L 64–65
2005	#7	First Round; Second Round	#10 Saint Mary's #2 Oklahoma State	W 65–56; L 77–85
2006	#11	First Round	#6 West Virginia	L 46–64
2007	#4	First Round; Second Round; Sweet Sixteen	#13 Holy Cross #5 Virginia Tech #1 Kansas	W 61–51; W 63–48; L 58–61

=== NCAA Division II tournament results ===
The Salukis have appeared in the NCAA Division II Tournament seven times. Their combined record is 17–9.

Year	Round	Opponent	Result
1959	Regional Semifinals; Regional Third Place	Wittenberg; Belmont Abbey	L 70–80; L 70–79
1961	Regional Semifinals; Regional Finals	Trinity; Southeast Missouri State	W 96–82; L 84–88
1962	Regional Semifinals; Regional Finals; Elite Eight; Final Four; National Third Place	Union; Evansville; Northeastern; Mount St. Mary's; Nebraska Wesleyan	W 70–56; W 88–83; W 73–57; L 57–58; W 98–91
1963	Regional Semifinals; Regional Finals; Elite Eight; Final Four; National Third Place	Southeast Missouri State; Lamar; Evansville; South Dakota State; Oglethorpe	W 87–79; W 93–84; W 86–73; L 76–80; L 64–68
1964	Regional Semifinals; Regional Finals	Ball State; Evansville	W 88–81; L 59–64
1965	Regional Semifinals; Regional Finals; Elite Eight; Final Four; National Championship Game	Concordia (IL); Central Michigan; Washington-St. Louis; North Dakota; Evansville	W 71–70; W 90–62; W 76–67; W 97–64; L 82–85 ^{OT}
1966	Regional Semifinals; Regional Finals; Elite Eight; Final Four; National Championship Game	Indiana State; Evansville; Fresno State; North Dakota; Kentucky Wesleyan	W 83–65; W 90–77; W 93–70; W 69–63; L 51–54

=== NAIA tournament results ===
The Salukis have appeared in five NAIA Division I tournaments. Their combined record is 9–4. They were NAIA national champions in 1946.

Year	Round	Opponent	Result
1945	First Round; Elite Eight; Final Four; Third Place Game	Washburn; Doane; Loyola (LA); Eastern Kentucky	W 64–49; W 61–44; L 35–37; W 49–45
1946	First Round; Second Round; Elite Eight; Final Four; National Championship	Central Missouri; Loras; Nevada; Loyola (LA); Indiana State	W 49–39; W 58–55; W 66–58; W 53–37; W 49–48
1947	First Round	Dakota Wesleyan	L 39–44
1948	First Round	Southern Oregon; Manhattan	W 54–50; L 42–52
1960	First Round	Oklahoma Baptist	L 71–75

=== NIT results ===
The Salukis have appeared in the National Invitation Tournament (NIT) nine times. Their combined record is 8–8. They were NIT champions in 1967.

Year	Round	Opponent	Result
1967	First Round; Quarterfinals; Semifinals; Finals	Saint Peter's; Duke; Rutgers; Marquette	W 103–58; W 72–63; W 79–70; W 71–56
1969	First Round	South Carolina	L 63–72
1975	First Round	Pittsburgh	L 65–70
1989	First Round	Saint Louis	L 54–87
1990	First Round	Green Bay	L 60–73
1991	First Round; Second Round; Quarterfinals	Boise State; Missouri State; Stanford	W 74–75; W 72–69; L 68–78
1992	First Round	Boston College	L 69–78
2000	First Round	Colorado; BYU	W 94–92; L 57–82
2008	First Round; Second Round	Oklahoma State; Arizona State	W 69–53; L 51–65

== Retired numbers ==
Two players have had their numbers retired by the school.

Southern Illinois Salukis retired numbers
No.	Player	Career	Ref.
20	Chico Vaughn	1958–1962	
52	Walt Frazier	1963–1967	
