= Northern Iowa Panthers men's basketball statistical leaders =

The Northern Iowa Panthers men's basketball statistical leaders are individual statistical leaders of the Northern Iowa Panthers men's basketball program in various categories, including points, assists, blocks, rebounds, and steals. Within those areas, the lists identify single-game, single-season, and career leaders. The Panthers represent the University of Northern Iowa in the NCAA's Missouri Valley Conference.

Northern Iowa began competing in intercollegiate basketball in 1900. However, the school's record book does not generally list records from before the 1950s, as records from before this period are often incomplete and inconsistent. Since scoring was much lower in this era, and teams played much fewer games during a typical season, it is likely that few or no players from this era would appear on these lists anyway.

The NCAA did not officially record assists as a stat until the 1983–84 season, and blocks and steals until the 1985–86 season, but Northern Iowa's record books includes players in these stats before these seasons. These lists are updated through the end of the 2020–21 season.

== Scoring ==
Career
Rk	Player	Points	Seasons
1	Jason Reese	2,033	1986–87 1987–88 1988–89 1989–90
2	Randy Kraayenbrink	2,004	1982–83 1983–84 1984–85 1985–86
3	Ben Jacobson	1,787	2002–03 2003–04 2004–05 2005–06
4	AJ Green	1,769	2018–19 2019–20 2020–21 2021–22
5	Seth Tuttle	1,747	2011–12 2012–13 2013–14 2014–15
6	Jason Daisy	1,721	1992–93 1994–95 1995–96 1996–97
7	Bill McCoy	1,713	1969–70 1970–71 1971–72 1972–73
8	Eric Coleman	1,522	2004–05 2005–06 2006–07 2007–08
9	Bowen Born	1,486	2020–21 2021–22 2022–23 2023–24
10	Ron Lemons	1,476	1975–76 1976–77 1977–78 1978–79

Season
Rk	Player	Points	Season
1	Randy Blocker	645	1993–94
2	Jason Reese	638	1989–90
3	Jason Reese	623	1988–89
4	AJ Green	610	2019–20
5	Jason Daisy	603	1995–96
6	Jason Daisy	593	1996–97
7	Cam Johnson	592	1993–94
8	Randy Kraayenbrink	587	1984–85
9	AJ Green	583	2021–22
10	Bowen Born	573	2022–23

Single game
Rk	Player	Points	Season	Opponent
1	Jerry Waugh	40	1967–68	North Dakota
	Cam Johnson	40	1993–94	Drake

== Rebounds ==
Career
Rk	Player	Rebounds	Seasons
1	Pete Spoden	1,104	1959–60 1960–61 1961–62 1962–63 1963–64
2	Jim Jackson	1,097	1958–59 1959–60 1960–61
3	Eric Coleman	997	2004–05 2005–06 2006–07 2007–08
4	Grant Stout	920	2003–04 2004–05 2005–06 2006–07
5	Seth Tuttle	917	2011–12 2012–13 2013–14 2014–15
6	Ken Huelman	818	1966–67 1967–68 1968–69
7	Tytan Anderson	800	2020–21 2021–22 2022–23 2023–24 2024–25
8	Jason Reese	773	1986–87 1987–88 1988–89 1989–90
9	Joe Breakenridge	766	1997–98 1998–99 1999–00 2000–01
10	Ron Lemons	760	1975–76 1976–77 1977–78 1978–79

Season
Rk	Player	Rebounds	Season
1	Jim Jackson	418	1958–59
2	Jim Jackson	392	1959–60
3	Pete Spoden	365	1960–61
4	Pete Spoden	357	1961–62
5	Joe Breakenridge	294	2000–01
	Grant Stout	294	2005–06
7	Al Carew	292	1951–52
8	Ken Huelman	289	1968–69
9	Jim Jackson	287	1960–61
10	Del Nicklaus	282	1955–56

Single game
Rk	Player	Rebounds	Season	Opponent
1	Pete Spoden	34	1960–61	Winona St.

== Assists ==
Career
Rk	Player	Assists	Seasons
1	Dale Turner	520	1988–89 1989–90 1990–91 1991–92
2	Brooks McKowen	425	2003–04 2004–05 2005–06 2006–07
3	Robbie Williams	418	1982–83 1983–84 1984–85 1985–86
4	Wes Washpun	399	2013–14 2014–15 2015–16
5	Mark Long	387	1975–76 1976–77 1977–78 1978–79
6	Deon Mitchell	373	2011–12 2012–13 2013–14 2014–15
7	Chris Foster	370	2000–01 2001–02 2002–03 2003–04 2004–05
8	Ben Jacobson	357	2002–03 2003–04 2004–05 2005–06
9	Kwadzo Ahelegbe	342	2006–07 2008–09 2009–10 2010–11
10	Nick Nurse	340	1985–86 1986–87 1987–88 1988–89

Season
Rk	Player	Assists	Season
1	Wes Washpun	190	2015–16
2	Brooks McKowen	179	2006–07
3	Dale Turner	152	1989–90
4	Dale Turner	146	1990–91
5	Robbie Williams	144	1983–84
6	Jay Imhoff	140	1979–80
7	Trey Campbell	136	2025–26
8	Robbie Williams	129	1985–86
9	Dale Turner	128	1988–89
10	Brent Carmichael	126	1982–83
	Deon Mitchell	126	2012–13

Single game
Rk	Player	Assists	Season	Opponent
1	Jay Imhoff	16	1979–80	

== Steals ==
Career
Rk	Player	Steals	Seasons
1	Brent Carmichael	180	1981–82 1982–83
2	Jeremy Morgan	179	2013–14 2014–15 2015–16 2016–17
3	Trey Campbell	174	2022–23 2023–24 2024–25 2025–26
4	Nick Nurse	165	1985–86 1986–87 1987–88 1988–89
5	Andy Woodley	159	1998–99 1999–00 2000–01 2001–02
6	Ben Jacobson	154	2002–03 2003–04 2004–05 2005–06
7	Johnny Moran	152	2008–09 2009–10 2010–11 2011–12
8	Tytan Anderson	149	2020–21 2021–22 2022–23 2023–24 2024–25
9	Dale Turner	143	1988–89 1989–90 1990–91 1991–92
10	Robbie Williams	140	1982–83 1983–84 1984–85 1985–86

Season
Rk	Player	Steals	Season
1	Brent Carmichael	100	1982–83
2	Brent Carmichael	80	1981–82
	Andy Woodley	80	2000–01
4	Jeremy Morgan	70	2015–16
5	Trey Campbell	60	2025–26
6	Cam Johnson	58	1992–93
7	Brian Carpenter	54	1995–96
8	Nick Nurse	53	1987–88
9	Ben Jacobson	51	2005–06
	Jeremy Morgan	51	2016–17

Single game
Rk	Player	Steals	Season	Opponent
1	Cam Johnson	9	1992–93	St. Bonaventure

== Blocks ==
Career
Rk	Player	Blocks	Seasons
1	Grant Stout	222	2003–04 2004–05 2005–06 2006–07
2	Jake Koch	123	2009–10 2010–11 2011–12 2012–13
3	Jordan Eglseder	120	2006–07 2007–08 2008–09 2009–10
4	Sean Hawkins	118	1994–95 1995–96 1996–97 1997–98
5	Eric Coleman	115	2004–05 2005–06 2006–07 2007–08
6	Jeremy Morgan	99	2013–14 2014–15 2015–16 2016–17
7	Seth Tuttle	95	2011–12 2012–13 2013–14 2014–15
8	Jason Sims	90	1992–93 1993–94 1994–95 1995–96
9	Scott Stafford	85	1983–84 1984–85
10	Steve Phyfe	66	1987–88 1988–89 1989–90

Season
Rk	Player	Blocks	Season
1	Grant Stout	80	2005–06
2	Grant Stout	75	2004–05
3	Scott Stafford	51	1983–84
4	Grant Stout	50	2006–07
5	Jordan Eglseder	44	2008–09
	Jake Koch	44	2012–13
7	Eric Coleman	43	2007–08
	Jason Sims	43	1994–95
9	Jordan Eglseder	38	2007–08
10	Ray Storck	36	1982–83

Single game
Rk	Player	Blocks	Season	Opponent
1	Scott Stafford	8	1983–84	Cleveland St.
