= 2003–04 Southern Illinois Salukis men's basketball team =

American college basketball season

2003–04 Southern Illinois Salukis men's basketball

MVC Regular season champion

NCAA tournament, First Round
- Conference: Missouri Valley Conference

Ranking
- AP: No. 23
- Record: 25–5 (17–1 MVC)
- Head coach: Matt Painter (1st season)
- Home arena: SIU Arena

2003–04 Missouri Valley Conference men's basketball standings
	Conf.				Overall
Team	W		L	PCT	W		L	PCT
No. 23 Southern Illinois	17	–	1	.944	25	–	5	.833
Northern Iowa †	12	–	6	.667	21	–	10	.677
Wichita State	12	–	6	.667	21	–	11	.656
Creighton	12	–	6	.667	20	–	9	.690
Southwest Missouri State	9	–	9	.500	19	–	14	.576
Drake	7	–	11	.389	12	–	16	.429
Bradley	7	–	11	.389	15	–	16	.484
Indiana State	5	–	13	.278	9	–	19	.321
Evansville	5	–	13	.278	7	–	22	.241
Illinois State	4	–	14	.222	10	–	19	.345
† 2004 Missouri Valley Tournament winner Rankings from AP Poll

The 2003–04 Southern Illinois Salukis men's basketball team represented Southern Illinois University Carbondale during the 2003–04 NCAA Division I men's basketball season. The Salukis were led by first-year head coach Matt Painter and played their home games at the SIU Arena in Carbondale, Illinois as members of the Missouri Valley Conference. They finished the season 25–5, 17–1 in MVC play to finish as regular season champion. They lost in the semifinals of the MVC tournament to Missouri State, but did receive an at-large bid to the NCAA tournament as No. 9 seed in the West region. The Salukis fell to No. 8 seed Alabama, 65–64, in the opening round.

== Roster ==
2003–04 Southern Illinois Salukis men's basketball team
Players
Coaches

Pos.	#	Name	Height	Weight	Year	Previous school	Hometown
G	1	Darren Brooks	6 ft 3 in (1.91 m)	205 lb (93 kg)	Jr	Jennings	St. Louis, Missouri
G	3	Jamaal Tatum	6 ft 2 in (1.88 m)	175 lb (79 kg)	Fr	Helias Catholic	Jefferson City, Missouri
F	13	Brad Korn	6 ft 9 in (2.06 m)	195 lb (88 kg)	Sr		Oswego, IL
C	21	Josh Warren	6 ft 8 in (2.03 m)	255 lb (116 kg)	Jr		Washington, MO
F	23	Jermaine Dearman	6 ft 8 in (2.03 m)	220 lb (100 kg)	Sr		Indianapolis, IN
G	33	Kent Williams	6 ft 2 in (1.88 m)	180 lb (82 kg)	Sr		Mt. Vernon, IL

Head coach

- Matt Painter (Purdue)

Assistant coach(es)

Legend

- (C) Team captain
- (S) Suspended
- (I) Ineligible
- (W) Walk-on
- Injured
- Current redshirt

Roster

== Schedule and results ==
Date time, TV	Rank^{#}	Opponent^{#}	Result	Record	Site (attendance) city, state
Non-conference regular season
Nov 22, 2003*		at Wyoming	W 67–62	1–0	Arena-Auditorium; Laramie, Wyoming
Nov 26, 2003*		Jacksonville State	W 84–49	2–0	SIU Arena; Carbondale, Illinois
Nov 29, 2003*		at Milwaukee	W 81–77	3–0	U.S. Cellular Arena; Milwaukee, Wisconsin
Dec 3, 2003*		Southeast Missouri State	W 71–58	4–0	SIU Arena; Carbondale, Illinois
Dec 6, 2003		at Drake	W 75–66	5–0 (1–0)	Knapp Center; Des Moines, Iowa
Dec 15, 2003*		at Wright State	W 79–73	6–0	Ervin J. Nutter Center; Fairborn, Ohio
Dec 17, 2003*		at Murray State	L 64–68	6–1	Regional Special Events Center; Murray, Kentucky
Dec 21, 2003*		Montana	W 82–71	7–1	SIU Arena; Carbondale, Illinois
Missouri Valley regular season
Dec 28, 2003		Illinois State	W 57–40	8–1 (2–0)	SIU Arena; Carbondale, Illinois
Jan 2, 2004*		Charlotte	L 59–64	8–2	SIU Arena; Carbondale, Illinois
Jan 7, 2004		at Indiana State	W 67–50	9–2 (3–0)	Hulman Center; Terre Haute, Indiana
Jan 11, 2004		Wichita State	W 73–64	10–2 (4–0)	SIU Arena; Carbondale, Illinois
Jan 14, 2004		Evansville	W 81–63	11–2 (5–0)	SIU Arena; Carbondale, Illinois
Jan 17, 2004		at Bradley	W 72–62	12–2 (6–0)	Carver Arena; Peoria, Illinois
Jan 21, 2004		at Illinois State	W 71–58	13–2 (7–0)	Redbird Arena; Normal, Illinois
Jan 25, 2004		Indiana State	W 53–44	14–2 (8–0)	SIU Arena; Carbondale, Illinois
Jan 28, 2004		at Wichita State	W 84–79	15–2 (9–0)	Charles Koch Arena; Wichita, Kansas
Jan 31, 2004		Northern Iowa	W 63–53	16–2 (10–0)	SIU Arena; Carbondale, Illinois
Feb 3, 2004		Missouri State	W 59–52	17–2 (11–0)	SIU Arena; Carbondale, Illinois
Feb 7, 2004*		at Creighton	W 61–60	18–2 (12–0)	Qwest Center Omaha; Omaha, Nebraska
Feb 11, 2004	No. 23	Drake	W 96–76	19–2 (13–0)	SIU Arena; Carbondale, Illinois
Feb 14, 2004	No. 23	at Missouri State	W 59–58	20–2 (14–0)	Hammons Student Center; Springfield, Missouri
Feb 18, 2004	No. 20	at Evansville	W 84–69	21–2 (15–0)	Roberts Municipal Stadium; Evansville, Indiana
Feb 21, 2004*	No. 20	Hawaii	W 66–62	22–2	SIU Arena; Carbondale, Illinois
Feb 24, 2004	No. 16	Creighton	W 68–60	23–2 (16–0)	SIU Arena; Carbondale, Illinois
Feb 28, 2004	No. 16	Bradley	W 72–71	24–2 (17–0)	SIU Arena; Carbondale, Illinois
Mar 1, 2004	No. 15	at Northern Iowa	L 52–68	24–3 (17–1)	UNI-Dome; Cedar Falls, Iowa
Missouri Valley tournament
Mar 6, 2004*	No. 15	vs. Evansville; Quarterfinals	W 93–67	25–3	Savvis Center; St. Louis, Missouri
Mar 7, 2004*	No. 15	vs. Missouri State; Semifinals	L 74–80	25–4	Savvis Center; St. Louis, Missouri
NCAA tournament
Mar 18, 2004*	(9 W) No. 23	vs. (8 W) Alabama; First round	L 64–65	25–5	KeyArena; Seattle, Washington
*Non-conference game. ^{#}Rankings from AP poll. (#) Tournament seedings in parentheses. W=West. All times are in Central Time.

== Awards and honors ==
- Darren Brooks – MVC Player of the Year
- Matt Painter – MVC Coach of the Year (second of three straight season a different Saluki head coach received the honor – Bruce Weber (2003) and Chris Lowery (2005))
