= List of Wright State Raiders men's basketball head coaches =

The following is a list of Wright State Raiders men's basketball head coaches. The Wright State Raiders men's basketball team has had ten head coaches.

Coach	Years	Overall	NCAA Tournament Appearances	NCAA Championships
John Ross	1970–71 to 1974–75	65–54	-	-
Marcus Jackson	1975–76 to 1977–78	45–37	-	-
Ralph Underhill	1978–79 to 1995–96	356–162	9	1
Jim Brown	1996–97	7–20	-	-
Ed Schilling	1997–98 to 2002–03	75–93	-	-
Paul Biancardi	2003–04 to 2005–06	42–44	-	-
Brad Brownell	2006–07 to 2009–10	84–45	1	-
Billy Donlon	2010–11 to 2015–16	108–94	-	-
Scott Nagy	2016–17 to 2023-24	167-92	2	-
Clint Sargent	2024–25 to Present	38-30	1	-
Totals	10 coaches	56 seasons	13	1
