= 2003–04 UIC Flames men's basketball team =

American college basketball season

2003–04 UIC Flames men's basketball

Horizon League tournament champions

NCAA tournament
- Conference: Horizon League
- Record: 24–8 (12–4 Horizon)
- Head coach: Jimmy Collins (8th season)
- Home arena: UIC Pavilion

2003–04 Horizon League men's basketball standings
	Conf.				Overall
Team	W		L	PCT	W		L	PCT
Milwaukee	13	–	3	.813	20	–	11	.645
Illinois-Chicago †	12	–	4	.750	24	–	8	.750
Green Bay	11	–	5	.688	17	–	11	.607
Detroit Mercy	10	–	6	.625	19	–	11	.633
Wright State	10	–	6	.625	14	–	14	.500
Butler	8	–	8	.500	16	–	14	.533
Youngstown State	4	–	12	.250	8	–	20	.286
Loyola Chicago	4	–	12	.250	9	–	20	.310
Cleveland State	0	–	16	.000	4	–	25	.138
† 2004 Horizon League Tournament winner

The 2003–04 UIC Flames men's basketball team represented the University of Illinois at Chicago during the 2003–04 NCAA Division I men's basketball season. The Flames, led by head coach Jimmy Collins, played their home games at the UIC Pavilion in Chicago, Illinois as members of the Horizon League. UIC finished the regular season in second place at 12–4. They went on to win the Horizon League tournament, and received the conference's automatic bid to the NCAA tournament. Playing as No. 13 seed in the St. Louis region, UIC was beaten by No. 4 seed Kansas, 78–53, in the opening round.

== Roster ==
2003–04 UIC Flames men's basketball team
Players
Coaches

Pos.	#	Name	Height	Weight	Year	Hometown
G	3	Martell Bailey	5 ft 10 in (1.78 m)	170 lb (77 kg)	Sr	Chicago, Illinois
F	4	Jovan Stefanov	6 ft 9 in (2.06 m)	220 lb (100 kg)	So	Belgrade, Serbia
F	14	Richard Lesko	6 ft 9 in (2.06 m)	210 lb (95 kg)	Sr	Košice, Slovakia
G	15	Marcetteaus McGee	6 ft 1 in (1.85 m)	160 lb (73 kg)	Fr	Chicago, Illinois
G	22	Rickey Dominguez	6 ft 4 in (1.93 m)	190 lb (86 kg)	Sr	Aurora, Illinois
F	25	Justin Bowen	6 ft 7 in (2.01 m)	205 lb (93 kg)	So	Chicago, Illinois
F	30	Armond Williams	6 ft 5 in (1.96 m)	205 lb (93 kg)	Jr	Hillside, Illinois
F	32	Aaron Carr	6 ft 4 in (1.93 m)	195 lb (88 kg)	Sr	Chicago, Illinois
G	33	Etienne Nelson	6 ft 1 in (1.85 m)	165 lb (75 kg)	So	Maywood, Illinois
G	34	Cedrick Banks	6 ft 2 in (1.88 m)	170 lb (77 kg)	Jr	Chicago, Illinois
C	40	Jabari Harris	6 ft 10 in (2.08 m)	215 lb (98 kg)	Sr	Broadview, Illinois
F	41	Kevin Mitchem	6 ft 10 in (2.08 m)	190 lb (86 kg)	Sr	Grandview, Missouri
F	42	Joe Scott	6 ft 10 in (2.08 m)	215 lb (98 kg)	Sr	Palos Hills, Illinois
F	44	Elliott Poole	6 ft 7 in (2.01 m)	225 lb (102 kg)	So	Chicago, Illinois
C	50	Josip Petrusic	6 ft 10 in (2.08 m)	245 lb (111 kg)	Jr	Metković, Croatia
F		Josh Williams	6 ft 8 in (2.03 m)	180 lb (82 kg)	So	Chicago, Illinois

Head coach

- Jimmy Collins (New Mexico State)

Assistant coach(es)

Legend

- (C) Team captain
- (S) Suspended
- (I) Ineligible
- (W) Walk-on
- Injured
- Current redshirt

Roster

== Schedule and results ==
Date time, TV	Rank^{#}	Opponent^{#}	Result	Record	Site (attendance) city, state
Exhibition
Nov 5, 2003*		Illinois All-Stars	W 97–69		UIC Pavilion; Chicago, Illinois
Nov 11, 2003*		St. Francis (IL)	W 92–56		UIC Pavilion; Chicago, Illinois
Regular season
Nov 15, 2003*; 5:00 p.m.		vs. UC Irvine; Dell BCA Classic	W 77–65	1–0	Cintas Center; Cincinnati, Ohio
Nov 16, 2003*; 6:00 p.m.		vs. Oakland; Dell BCA Classic	L 66–79	1–1	Cintas Center; Cincinnati, Ohio
Nov 17, 2003*; 5:30 p.m.		vs. Mercer; Dell BCA Classic	W 75–64	2–1	Cintas Center; Cincinnati, Ohio
Nov 21, 2003*; 7:00 p.m.		at Evansville	W 70–54	3–1	Roberts Municipal Stadium (8,416); Evansville, Indiana
Nov 25, 2003*; 7:00 p.m.		Evansville	W 77–74	4–1	UIC Pavilion (4,861); Chicago, Illinois
Nov 29, 2003*; 2:00 p.m.		at UTSA	W 73–47	5–1	Convocation Center (569); San Antonio, Texas
Dec 2, 2003*; 7:30 p.m.		at Eastern Illinois	W 77–60	6–1	Lantz Arena (1,286); Charleston, Illinois
Dec 5, 2003*; 5:45 p.m.		vs. Northern Illinois; Gazette-Hawkeye Challenge	L 53–54	6–2	Carver-Hawkeye Arena; Iowa City, Iowa
Dec 6, 2003*; 5:45 p.m.		vs. Eastern Washington; Gazette-Hawkeye Challenge	W 67–52	7–2	Carver-Hawkeye Arena; Iowa City, Iowa
Dec 13, 2003*; 5:00 p.m.		Illinois State	W 86–74	8–2	UIC Pavilion (5,978); Chicago, Illinois
Dec 20, 2003*; 5:00 p.m.		Northwestern	W 90–71	9–2	UIC Pavilion (5,092); Chicago, Illinois
Dec 23, 2003; 7:00 p.m.		at Milwaukee	L 62–78	9–3 (0–1)	U.S. Cellular Arena (4,089); Milwaukee, Wisconsin
Dec 30, 2003*; 7:00 p.m., WBBM		vs. No. 20 Illinois	L 60–75	9–4	United Center (15,415); Chicago, Illinois
Jan 3, 2004; 12:00 p.m.		Detroit	L 48–56	9–5 (0–2)	UIC Pavilion (2,544); Chicago, Illinois
Jan 5, 2004; 7:30 p.m.		Youngstown State	W 66–47	10–5 (1–2)	UIC Pavilion (1,564); Chicago, Illinois
Jan 8, 2004; 7:00 p.m.		Loyola (IL)	W 77–59	11–5 (2–2)	UIC Pavilion (3,872); Chicago, Illinois
Jan 15, 2004; 7:05 p.m.		at Detroit	L 67–70	11–6 (2–3)	Calihan Hall (1,590); Detroit, Michigan
Jan 17, 2004; 3:00 p.m.		Cleveland State	W 83–68	12–6 (3–3)	UIC Pavilion (4,274); Chicago, Illinois
Jan 21, 2004; 6:00 p.m.		at Wright State	L 60–61	12–7 (3–4)	Ervin J. Nutter Center (4,597); Dayton, Ohio
Jan 24, 2004; 7:00 p.m.		Green Bay	W 74–57	13–7 (4–4)	UIC Pavilion (5,012); Chicago, Illinois
Jan 26, 2004; 7:00 p.m.		at Loyola (IL)	W 64–57	14–7 (5–4)	Joseph J. Gentile Center (3,984); Chicago, Illinois
Jan 31, 2004; 2:00 p.m.		at Butler	W 74–71 ^{OT}	15–7 (6–4)	Hinkle Fieldhouse (5,005); Indianapolis, Indiana
Feb 5, 2004; 7:00 p.m.		Milwaukee	W 86–82	16–7 (7–4)	UIC Pavilion (5,164); Chicago, Illinois
Feb 12, 2004; 7:00 p.m.		at Youngstown State	W 62–58	17–7 (8–4)	Beeghly Center (1,984); Youngstown, Ohio
Feb 14, 2004; 5:30 p.m.		at Cleveland State	W 67–56	18–7 (9–4)	Henry J. Goodman Arena (2,020); Cleveland, Ohio
Feb 18, 2004; 7:00 p.m.		at Green Bay	W 63–55	19–7 (10–4)	Resch Center (4,778); Green Bay, Wisconsin
Feb 21, 2004*; 3:00 p.m.		UNC Wilmington; ESPN BracketBusters	W 77–52	20–7	UIC Pavilion (5,023); Chicago, Illinois
Feb 26, 2004; 7:00 p.m.		Wright State	W 75–71	21–7 (11–4)	UIC Pavilion (5,124); Chicago, Illinois
Feb 28, 2004; 6:00 p.m.		Butler	W 64–54	22–7 (12–4)	UIC Pavilion (6,752); Chicago, Illinois
Horizon League tournament
Mar 6, 2004*; 8:00 p.m.	(2)	vs. (6) Butler; Semifinals	W 65–56	23–7	Hinkle Fieldhouse (3,286); Indianapolis, Indiana
Mar 9, 2004*; 8:00 p.m.	(2)	at (1) Milwaukee; Championship game	W 65–62	24–7	U.S. Cellular Arena (10,254); Milwaukee, Wisconsin
NCAA tournament
Mar 19, 2004*; 8:45 p.m., CBS	(13 STL)	vs. (4 STL) No. 16 Kansas; First round	L 53–78	24–8	Kemper Arena (17,667); Kansas City, Missouri
*Non-conference game. ^{#}Rankings from AP Poll. (#) Tournament seedings in parentheses. STL=St. Louis. All times are in Central Time Zone.
