= 2003–04 Northern Iowa Panthers men's basketball team =

American college basketball season

2003–04 Northern Iowa Panthers men's basketball

Missouri Valley tournament champions

NCAA tournament, first round
- Conference: Missouri Valley Conference
- Record: 21–10 (12–6 MVC)
- Head coach: Greg McDermott (3rd season)
- Assistant coach: Ben Jacobson
- Home arena: UNI-Dome

2003–04 Missouri Valley Conference men's basketball standings
	Conf.				Overall
Team	W		L	PCT	W		L	PCT
No. 23 Southern Illinois	17	–	1	.944	25	–	5	.833
Northern Iowa †	12	–	6	.667	21	–	10	.677
Wichita State	12	–	6	.667	21	–	11	.656
Creighton	12	–	6	.667	20	–	9	.690
Southwest Missouri State	9	–	9	.500	19	–	14	.576
Drake	7	–	11	.389	12	–	16	.429
Bradley	7	–	11	.389	15	–	16	.484
Indiana State	5	–	13	.278	9	–	19	.321
Evansville	5	–	13	.278	7	–	22	.241
Illinois State	4	–	14	.222	10	–	19	.345
† 2004 Missouri Valley Tournament winner Rankings from AP Poll

The 2003–04 Northern Iowa Panthers men's basketball team represented the University of Northern Iowa during the 2003–04 NCAA Division I men's basketball season. The Panthers, led by third-year head coach Greg McDermott, played their home games at the UNI-Dome in Cedar Falls, Iowa and were members of the Missouri Valley Conference (The Valley). They finished the season 21–10, 12–6 in MVC play to finish in second place. They defeated SW Missouri State in the championship game of the Missouri Valley tournament, and received an automatic bid to the NCAA tournament. Playing as the No. 14 seed in the Midwest region, UNI was defeated by No. 3 seed and eventual National runner-up Georgia Tech in the opening round.

== Roster ==
2003–04 Northern Iowa Panthers men's basketball team
Players
Coaches

Pos.	#	Name	Height	Weight	Year	Hometown
G	12	Ben Jacobson	6 ft 3 in (1.91 m)	205 lb (93 kg)	So	Sioux City, IA
G	23	Brooks McKowen	6 ft 2 in (1.88 m)	195 lb (88 kg)	Fr	Fairbank, IA

Head coach

- Greg McDermott (Northern Iowa)

Assistant coach(es)

- Ben Jacobson (Northern Dakota)

Legend

- (C) Team captain
- (S) Suspended
- (I) Ineligible
- (W) Walk-on
- Injured
- Current redshirt

Roster

== Schedule and results ==
Date time, TV	Rank^{#}	Opponent^{#}	Result	Record	Site (attendance) city, state
Non-conference Regular season
Nov 21, 2003*		Chicago State	W 83–59	1–0	UNI-Dome (1,955); Cedar Falls, Iowa
Nov 25, 2003*		Butler	L 54–56	1–1	UNI-Dome (3,641); Cedar Falls, Iowa
Nov 30, 2003*		at Iowa State	L 76–79	1–2	Hilton Coliseum (9,690); Ames, Iowa
Dec 2, 2003*		Louisiana Tech	W 75–72	2–2	UNI-Dome (2,087); Cedar Falls, Iowa
Dec 6, 2003*		Furman	L 55–64	2–3	UNI-Dome (1,892); Cedar Falls, Iowa
Dec 9, 2003*		No. 24 Iowa	W 77–66	3–3	UNI-Dome (9,886); Cedar Falls, Iowa
Dec 13, 2003*		Minnesota-Crookston	W 80–58	4–3	UNI-Dome (3,729); Cedar Falls, Iowa
Missouri Valley Conference Regular season
Dec 20, 2003		at Illinois State	W 64–61	5–3 (1–0)	Redbird Arena (5,213); Normal, Illinois
Dec 30, 2003*		Siena	W 82–70	6–3	UNI-Dome (2,780); Cedar Falls, Iowa
Jan 3, 2004		Evansville	W 80–67	7–3 (2–0)	UNI-Dome (2,286); Cedar Falls, Iowa
Jan 8, 2004		at Wichita State	L 65–82	7–4 (2–1)	Charles Koch Arena (9,186); Wichita, Kansas
Jan 11, 2004		at SW Missouri State	L 60–62	7–5 (2–2)	Hammons Student Center (5,158); Springfield, Missouri
Jan 14, 2004*		No. 24 Creighton	W 82–73	8–5 (3–2)	UNI-Dome (4,231); Cedar Falls, Iowa
Jan 17, 2004*		Drake	W 76–56	9–5 (4–2)	UNI-Dome (6,094); Cedar Falls, Iowa
Jan 21, 2004		at Evansville	W 67–53	10–5 (5–2)	Roberts Municipal Stadium (5,266); Evansville, Indiana
Jan 24, 2004		Bradley	W 78–71	11–5 (6–2)	UNI-Dome (4,246); Cedar Falls, Iowa
Jan 28, 2004		Illinois State	L 60–68	11–6 (6–3)	UNI-Dome (2,684); Cedar Falls, Iowa
Jan 31, 2004		at Southern Illinois	L 53–63	11–7 (6–4)	SIU Arena (8,434); Carbondale, Illinois
Feb 4, 2004		at Creighton	L 47–58	11–8 (6–5)	Qwest Center Omaha (10,845); Omaha, Nebraska
Feb 7, 2004		Indiana State	W 68–64	12–8 (7–5)	UNI-Dome (3,354); Cedar Falls, Iowa
Feb 11, 2004		SW Missouri State	W 64–59	13–8 (8–5)	UNI-Dome (2,754); Cedar Falls, Iowa
Feb 14, 2004		at Bradley	L 64–72	13–9 (8–6)	Carver Arena (9,246); Peoria, Illinois
Feb 18, 2004		Wichita State	W 85–80	14–9 (9–6)	UNI-Dome (4,008); Cedar Falls, Iowa
Feb 21, 2004*		at Wisconsin–Green Bay	W 82–75	15–9	Resch Center (4,722); Ashwaubenon, Wisconsin
Feb 25, 2004		at Drake	W 84–79 ^{OT}	16–9 (10–6)	Knapp Center (6,427); Des Moines, Iowa
Feb 28, 2004		at Indiana State	W 48–47	17–9 (11–6)	Hulman Center (8,120); Terre Haute, Indiana
Mar 1, 2004		No. 15 Southern Illinois	W 68–52	18–9 (12–6)	UNI-Dome (7,823); Cedar Falls, Iowa
Missouri Valley tournament
Mar 6, 2004*		vs. Illinois State; Quarterfinals	W 68–54	19–9	Savvis Center (9,819); St. Louis, Missouri
Mar 7, 2004*		vs. Wichita State; Semifinals	W 63–56	20–9	Savvis Center (13,287); St. Louis, Missouri
Mar 8, 2004*		vs. SW Missouri State; Championship game	W 79–74 ^{2OT}	21–9	Savvis Center (7,971); St. Louis, Missouri
NCAA tournament
Mar 19, 2004*	(14 MW)	vs. (3 MW) No. 14 Georgia Tech; First round	L 60–65	21–10	Bradley Center (18,866); Milwaukee, Wisconsin
*Non-conference game. ^{#}Rankings from AP Poll. (#) Tournament seedings in parentheses. MW=Midwest. All times are in Central Time.
