= 2003–04 Milwaukee Panthers men's basketball team =

American college basketball season

2003–04 Milwaukee Panthers men's basketball
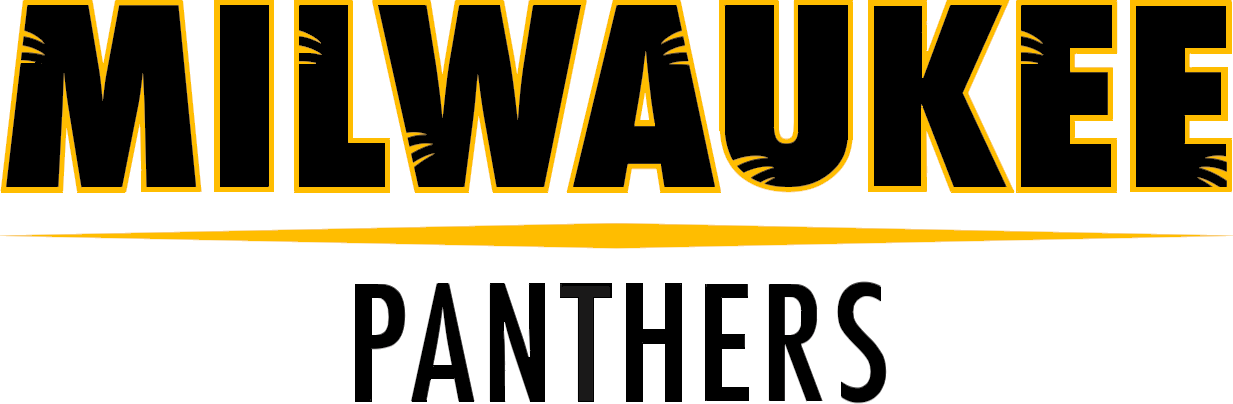

Horizon League Regular season champions

2004 NIT
- Conference: Horizon League
- Record: 20–11 (13–3 Horizon)
- Head coach: Bruce Pearl (3rd season)
- Home arena: U.S. Cellular Arena

2003–04 Horizon League men's basketball standings
	Conf.				Overall
Team	W		L	PCT	W		L	PCT
Milwaukee	13	–	3	.813	20	–	11	.645
Illinois-Chicago †	12	–	4	.750	24	–	8	.750
Green Bay	11	–	5	.688	17	–	11	.607
Detroit Mercy	10	–	6	.625	19	–	11	.633
Wright State	10	–	6	.625	14	–	14	.500
Butler	8	–	8	.500	16	–	14	.533
Youngstown State	4	–	12	.250	8	–	20	.286
Loyola Chicago	4	–	12	.250	9	–	20	.310
Cleveland State	0	–	16	.000	4	–	25	.138
† 2004 Horizon League Tournament winner

The 2003–04 Milwaukee Panthers men's basketball team represented the University of Wisconsin–Milwaukee during the 2003–04 NCAA Division I men's basketball season. The Panthers, led by 3rd-year head coach Bruce Pearl, played their home games at the U.S. Cellular Arena and were members of the Horizon League. They finished the season with a record of 20–11, 13–3 to finish in first place in the Horizon League. Seeded first, the Panthers won their first game in the semifinals of the Horizon League tournament before they lost in the final game to UIC. They received an automatic bid to the 2004 NIT due to being a regular season conference champion that did not receive an invite to the NCAA Tournament. In the NIT the Panthers defeated Rice by a score of 91-63 in the opening round before falling to Boise State in the 1st Round by a score of 73-70.

== Roster ==
2003–04 Milwaukee Panthers men's basketball team
Players
Coaches

Pos.	#	Name	Height	Weight	Year	Hometown
G	1	Ricardo Freeman	6 ft 3 in (1.91 m)	160 lb (73 kg)	Jr	Hartford, Connecticut
G	4	Chris Hill	6 ft 3 in (1.91 m)	185 lb (84 kg)	Sr	Schaumburg, Illinois
G	12	Allan Hanson	6 ft 0 in (1.83 m)	170 lb (77 kg)	So	Wauwatosa, Wisconsin
F	13	Joah Tucker	6 ft 5 in (1.96 m)	220 lb (100 kg)	Sr	Milwaukee, Wisconsin
G	14	Derrick Wimmer	6 ft 4 in (1.93 m)	175 lb (79 kg)	Jr	Milwaukee, Wisconsin
G	20	Myles McKay	6 ft 3 in (1.91 m)	180 lb (82 kg)	So	Menomonee Falls, Wisconsin
F	21	Jason McCoy	6 ft 9 in (2.06 m)	190 lb (86 kg)	Sr	Houston, Texas
G	24	Boo Davis	6 ft 3 in (1.91 m)	190 lb (86 kg)	Sr	Chicago, Illinois
G	33	Nick Hansen	6 ft 5 in (1.96 m)	200 lb (91 kg)	Jr	Appleton, Wisconsin
F	40	Michael Bendall	6 ft 7 in (2.01 m)	210 lb (95 kg)	So	Oconomowoc, Wisconsin
F	44	Adrian Tigert	6 ft 7 in (2.01 m)	240 lb (109 kg)	Sr	Oshkosh, Wisconsin
C	50	Derrick Ford	6 ft 10 in (2.08 m)	240 lb (109 kg)	Sr	Toledo, Ohio

Head coach

- Bruce Pearl

Assistant coach(es)

Legend

- (C) Team captain
- (S) Suspended
- (I) Ineligible
- (W) Walk-on
- Injured
- Current redshirt

Roster
Last update: November 29, 2022

== Schedule and results ==
Date time, TV	Rank^{#}	Opponent^{#}	Result	Record	Site city, state
Regular season
Nov 22, 2003*		Montana	W 95–83	1–0	U.S. Cellular Arena (3,257); Milwaukee, Wisconsin
Nov 25, 2003*		Concordia-St. Paul	W 90–62	2–0	U.S. Cellular Arena (2,010); Milwaukee, Wisconsin
Nov 29, 2003*		Southern Illinois	L 77–81	2–1	U.S. Cellular Arena (3,269); Milwaukee, Wisconsin
Dec 3, 2003*		at Prairie View A&M	W 87–70	3–1	William J. Nicks Building (3,022); Prairie View, Texas
Dec 7, 2003*		at NC State	L 71–77	3–2	RBC Center (10,691); Raleigh, North Carolina
Dec 10, 2003*		at Valparaiso	W 86–82	4–2	Athletics–Recreation Center (2,897); Valparaiso, Indiana
Dec 13, 2003*; 7:30 pm, ESPNU	No. 23	at Wisconsin	L 71–89	4–3	Kohl Center (17,142); Madison, Wisconsin
Dec 23, 2003		UIC	W 78–62	5–3 (1–0)	U.S. Cellular Arena (4,089); Milwaukee, Wisconsin
Dec 29, 2003*		at Santa Clara	L 64–66	5–4	Leavey Center (1,903); Santa Clara, California
Dec 30, 2003*		vs. Idaho State	W 85–70	6–4	Leavey Center (2,418); Santa Clara, California
Jan 2, 2004*		at Air Force	L 49–71	6–5	Clune Arena (2,028); Colorado Springs, Colorado
Jan 5, 2004		Detroit	W 82–74	7–5 (2–0)	U.S. Cellular Arena (2,223); Milwaukee, Wisconsin
Jan 8, 2004		Butler	W 71–59	8–5 (3–0)	U.S. Cellular Arena (4,207); Milwaukee, Wisconsin
Jan 10, 2004		at Loyola (IL)	W 97–87	9–5 (4–0)	Joseph J. Gentile Center (2,862); Chicago, Illinois
Jan 15, 2004		Youngstown State	W 80–74	10–5 (5–0)	U.S. Cellular Arena (2,351); Milwaukee, Wisconsin
Jan 17, 2004		at Green Bay	W 82–70	11–5 (6–0)	Resch Center (7,522); Green Bay, Wisconsin
Jan 22, 2004		at Cleveland State	W 78–64	12–5 (7–0)	Henry J. Goodman Arena (1,266); Cleveland, Ohio
Jan 24, 2004		at Detroit	W 85–68	13–5 (8–0)	Calihan Hall (3,218); Detroit, Michigan
Jan 27, 2004		at Wright State	W 68–53	14–5 (9–0)	Ervin J. Nutter Center (7,159); Fairborn, Ohio
Jan 31, 2004		Green Bay	W 81–70	15–5 (10–0)	U.S. Cellular Arena (8,703); Milwaukee, Wisconsin
Feb 5, 2004		at UIC	L 82–86	15–6 (10–1)	UIC Pavilion (5,164); Chicago, Illinois
Feb 7, 2004		Wright State	W 72–66	16–6 (11–1)	U.S. Cellular Arena (4,118); Milwaukee, Wisconsin
Feb 12, 2004		Loyola (IL)	W 77–71	17–6 (12–1)	U.S. Cellular Arena (4,455); Milwaukee, Wisconsin
Feb 14, 2004		at Youngstown State	L 84–85	17–7 (12–2)	Beeghly Center (2,885); Youngstown, Ohio
Feb 18, 2004		at Butler	L 58–75	17–8 (12–3)	Hinkle Fieldhouse (3,645); Indianapolis, Indiana
Feb 21, 2004*		Manhattan; ESPN BracketBusters	L 76–83	17–9	U.S. Cellular Arena (4,752); Milwaukee, Wisconsin
Feb 28, 2004		Cleveland State	W 88–63	18–9 (13–3)	U.S. Cellular Arena (3,236); Milwaukee, Wisconsin
2004 Horizon League Tournament
Mar 6, 2004	(1)	vs. (4) Detroit; Semifinals	W 58–50	19–9	Hinkle Fieldhouse (3,286); Indianapolis, Indiana
Mar 9, 2004	(1)	(2) UIC; Championship game	L 62–65	19–10	U.S. Cellular Arena (10,254); Milwaukee, Wisconsin
2004 NIT
Mar 17, 2004		Rice; Opening round	W 91–63	20–10	U.S. Cellular Arena (3,617); Milwaukee, Wisconsin
Mar 20, 2004		at Boise State; First round	L 70–73	20–11	Ford Idaho Center (10,153); Nampa, Idaho
*Non-conference game. ^{#}Rankings from AP poll. (#) Tournament seedings in parentheses. W=West. All times are in Central Time.
