= 2005 Missouri Valley Conference men's basketball tournament =

- Classification: Division I
- Season: 2004–05
- Teams: 10
- Site: Savvis Center; St. Louis, Missouri
- Champions: Creighton (9th title)
- Winning coach: Dana Altman (5th title)
- MVP: Johnny Mathies (Creighton)

2004–05 Missouri Valley Conference men's basketball standings
	Conf.				Overall
Team	W		L	PCT	W		L	PCT
Southern Illinois	15	–	3	.833	27	–	8	.771
Wichita State	12	–	6	.667	22	–	10	.688
Creighton †	11	–	7	.611	23	–	11	.676
Northern Iowa	11	–	7	.611	21	–	11	.656
Southwest Missouri State	10	–	8	.556	19	–	13	.594
Illinois State	8	–	10	.444	17	–	13	.567
Drake	7	–	11	.389	13	–	16	.448
Bradley	6	–	12	.333	13	–	15	.464
Indiana State	5	–	13	.278	11	–	20	.355
Evansville	5	–	13	.278	11	–	17	.393
† 2005 Missouri Valley Tournament winner Rankings from AP Poll

The 2005 Missouri Valley Conference men's basketball tournament was played from March 4-7, 2005 at the Savvis Center in St. Louis, Missouri at the conclusion of the 2004–2005 regular season. The Creighton won their 9th MVC tournament title to earn an automatic bid to the 2005 NCAA tournament.

== Tournament Bracket ==
Opening Round; Thursday, March 4
8	Bradley	61
9	Indiana State	63
7	Drake	82
10	Evansville	68

Quarterfinals; Friday, March 5
1	Southern Illinois	64
9	Indiana State	49
4	Northern Iowa	62
5	Southwest Missouri State	70
2	Wichita State	72
7	Drake	52
3	Creighton	69
6	Illinois State	52

Semifinals; Saturday, March 6
1	Southern Illinois	61
5	Southwest Missouri State	65
2	Wichita State	60
3	Creighton	70

Final; Sunday, March 7
5	Southwest Missouri State	57
3	Creighton	75

== See also ==
- Missouri Valley Conference
