= 2004 Missouri Valley Conference men's basketball tournament =

- Classification: Division I
- Season: 2003–04
- Teams: 10
- Site: Scottrade Center; St. Louis, Missouri
- Champions: Northern Iowa (1st title)
- Winning coach: Greg McDermott (1st title)
- MVP: Ben Jacobson (Northern Iowa)

2003–04 Missouri Valley Conference men's basketball standings
	Conf.				Overall
Team	W		L	PCT	W		L	PCT
No. 23 Southern Illinois	17	–	1	.944	25	–	5	.833
Northern Iowa †	12	–	6	.667	21	–	10	.677
Wichita State	12	–	6	.667	21	–	11	.656
Creighton	12	–	6	.667	20	–	9	.690
Southwest Missouri State	9	–	9	.500	19	–	14	.576
Drake	7	–	11	.389	12	–	16	.429
Bradley	7	–	11	.389	15	–	16	.484
Indiana State	5	–	13	.278	9	–	19	.321
Evansville	5	–	13	.278	7	–	22	.241
Illinois State	4	–	14	.222	10	–	19	.345
† 2004 Missouri Valley Tournament winner Rankings from AP Poll

The 2004 Missouri Valley Conference men's basketball tournament was played in St. Louis, Missouri at the conclusion of the 2003–2004 regular season.

== Tournament Bracket ==
Opening Round; Thursday, March 5
8	Indiana State	59
9	Evansville	63
7	Bradley	56
10	Illinois State	76

Quarterfinals; Friday, March 6
1	No. 15 Southern Illinois	93
9	Evansville	67
4	Creighton	75
5	Southwest Missouri State	84
2	Northern Iowa	68
10	Illinois State	54
3	Wichita State	63
6	Drake	57

Semifinals; Saturday, March 7
1	No. 15 Southern Illinois	74
5	Southwest Missouri State	80
2	Northern Iowa	63
3	Wichita State	56

Final; Sunday, March 8
5	Southwest Missouri State	74^{OT}
2	Northern Iowa	79

== See also ==
- Missouri Valley Conference
