= 2004–05 Creighton Bluejays men's basketball team =

American college basketball season

2004–05 Creighton Bluejays men's basketball
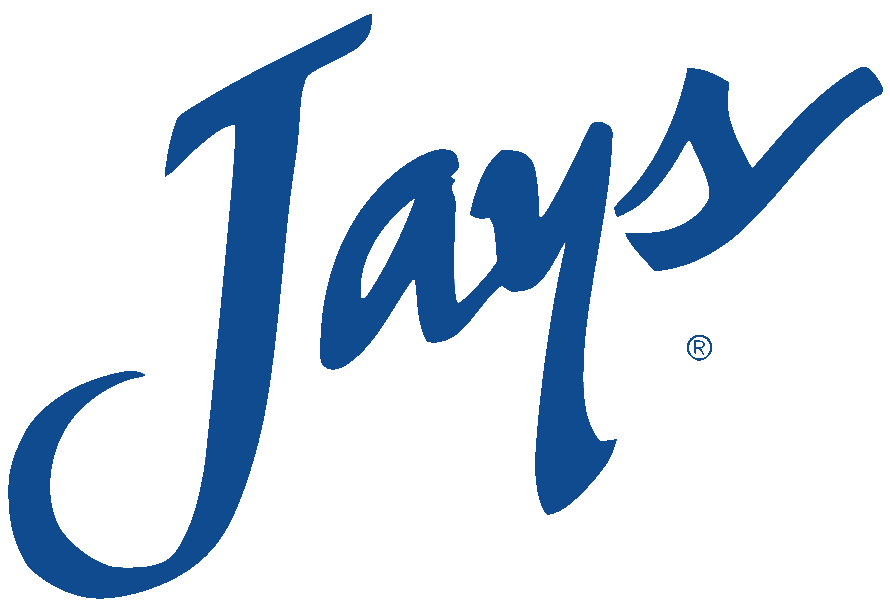

NCAA tournament, first round
- Conference: Missouri Valley Conference
- Record: 23–11 (11–7 MVC)
- Head coach: Dana Altman (11th season)
- Home arena: Qwest Center Omaha

2004–05 Missouri Valley Conference men's basketball standings
	Conf.				Overall
Team	W		L	PCT	W		L	PCT
Southern Illinois	15	–	3	.833	27	–	8	.771
Wichita State	12	–	6	.667	22	–	10	.688
Creighton †	11	–	7	.611	23	–	11	.676
Northern Iowa	11	–	7	.611	21	–	11	.656
Southwest Missouri State	10	–	8	.556	19	–	13	.594
Illinois State	8	–	10	.444	17	–	13	.567
Drake	7	–	11	.389	13	–	16	.448
Bradley	6	–	12	.333	13	–	15	.464
Indiana State	5	–	13	.278	11	–	20	.355
Evansville	5	–	13	.278	11	–	17	.393
† 2005 Missouri Valley Tournament winner Rankings from AP Poll

The 2004–05 Creighton Bluejays men's basketball team represented Creighton University during the 2004–05 NCAA Division I men's basketball season. Led by head coach Dana Altman in his 11th season, the Bluejays ended the season with a record of 23–11 (11–7 MVC). They won the MVC tournament to receive an automatic bid to the NCAA tournament as the No. 10 seed in the West region. The Jays were beaten by No. 7 seed West Virginia in the opening round, 63–61.

== Roster ==
2004–05 Creighton Bluejays men's basketball team
Players
Coaches

Pos.	#	Name	Height	Weight	Year	Hometown
C	1	Jeffrey Day	6 ft 9 in (2.06 m)	235 lb (107 kg)	Jr	Seattle, Washington
G	3	Nick Porter	6 ft 3 in (1.91 m)	210 lb (95 kg)	So	Compton, California
G	4	Dominic Bishop	6 ft 0 in (1.83 m)	170 lb (77 kg)	So	Buffalo, New York
G	10	Nate Funk	6 ft 3 in (1.91 m)	195 lb (88 kg)	Jr	Sioux City, Iowa
G	11	Johnny Mathies	6 ft 0 in (1.83 m)	170 lb (77 kg)	Jr	Louisville, Kentucky
G	15	Kellen Miliner	6 ft 2 in (1.88 m)	175 lb (79 kg)	Sr	Warner Robins, Georgia
G	20	Pierce Hibma	6 ft 5 in (1.96 m)	205 lb (93 kg)	Fr	Pella, Iowa
G	24	Tyler McKinney	6 ft 1 in (1.85 m)	185 lb (84 kg)	Sr	Urbandale, Iowa
F	30	Jimmy Motz	6 ft 7 in (2.01 m)	225 lb (102 kg)	Sr	Lincoln, Nebraska
C	44	Anthony Tolliver	6 ft 8 in (2.03 m)	240 lb (109 kg)	So	Springfield, Missouri
F	50	Dane Watts	6 ft 8 in (2.03 m)	225 lb (102 kg)	Fr	Warrensburg, Missouri

Head coach

- Dana Altman

Assistant coach(es)

Legend

- (C) Team captain
- (S) Suspended
- (I) Ineligible
- (W) Walk-on
- Injured
- Current redshirt

== Schedule and results ==
Date time, TV	Rank^{#}	Opponent^{#}	Result	Record	Site city, state
Regular season
Nov 15, 2004*		Alcorn State	W 74–40	1–0	Qwest Center Omaha; Omaha, Nebraska
Nov 16, 2004*		Iona	W 68–62	2–0	Qwest Center Omaha; Omaha, Nebraska
Nov 20, 2004*		Arkansas-Pine Bluff	W 83–58	3–0	Qwest Center Omaha; Omaha, Nebraska
Nov 23, 2004*		vs. Missouri; Guardians Classic	W 78–54	4–0	Municipal Auditorium; Kansas City, Missouri
Nov 24, 2004*		vs. Ohio State; Guardians Classic	W 65–63 ^{OT}	5–0	Municipal Auditorium; Kansas City, Missouri
Nov 30, 2004*		at Xavier	W 73–72	6–0	Cintas Center; Cincinnati, Ohio
Dec 4, 2004*		High Point	W 79–60	7–0	Qwest Center Omaha; Omaha, Nebraska
Dec 7, 2004*		Kent State	L 58–67	7–1	Qwest Center Omaha; Omaha, Nebraska
Dec 11, 2004*		at Nebraska; Rivalry	W 50–48	8–1	Bob Devaney Sports Center; Lincoln, Nebraska
Missing games
Feb 19, 2005*		Chattanooga; Bracket Buster	W 100–68	17–10	Qwest Center Omaha; Omaha, Nebraska
Feb 22, 2005		Evansville	W 69–64	18–10 (9–7)	Qwest Center Omaha; Omaha, Nebraska
Feb 26, 2005		Indiana State	W 74–55	19–10 (10–7)	Qwest Center Omaha; Omaha, Nebraska
Feb 28, 2005		at Illinois State	W 64–59	20–10 (11–7)	Redbird Arena; Normal, Illinois
MVC Tournament
Mar 5, 2005*		vs. Illinois State; Quarterfinals	W 69–52	21–10	Savvis Center; St. Louis, Missouri
Mar 6, 2005*		vs. Wichita State; Semifinals	W 70–60	22–10	Savvis Center; St. Louis, Missouri
Mar 7, 2005*		vs. SW Missouri State; Championship game	W 75–57	23–10	Savvis Center; St. Louis, Missouri
NCAA Tournament
Mar 17, 2005*	(10 W)	vs. (7 W) West Virginia; First round	L 61–63	23–11	Wolstein Center; Cleveland, Ohio
*Non-conference game. ^{#}Rankings from AP Poll. (#) Tournament seedings in parentheses. W=West.
