= Porter Moser =

American basketball player-coach (born 1968)

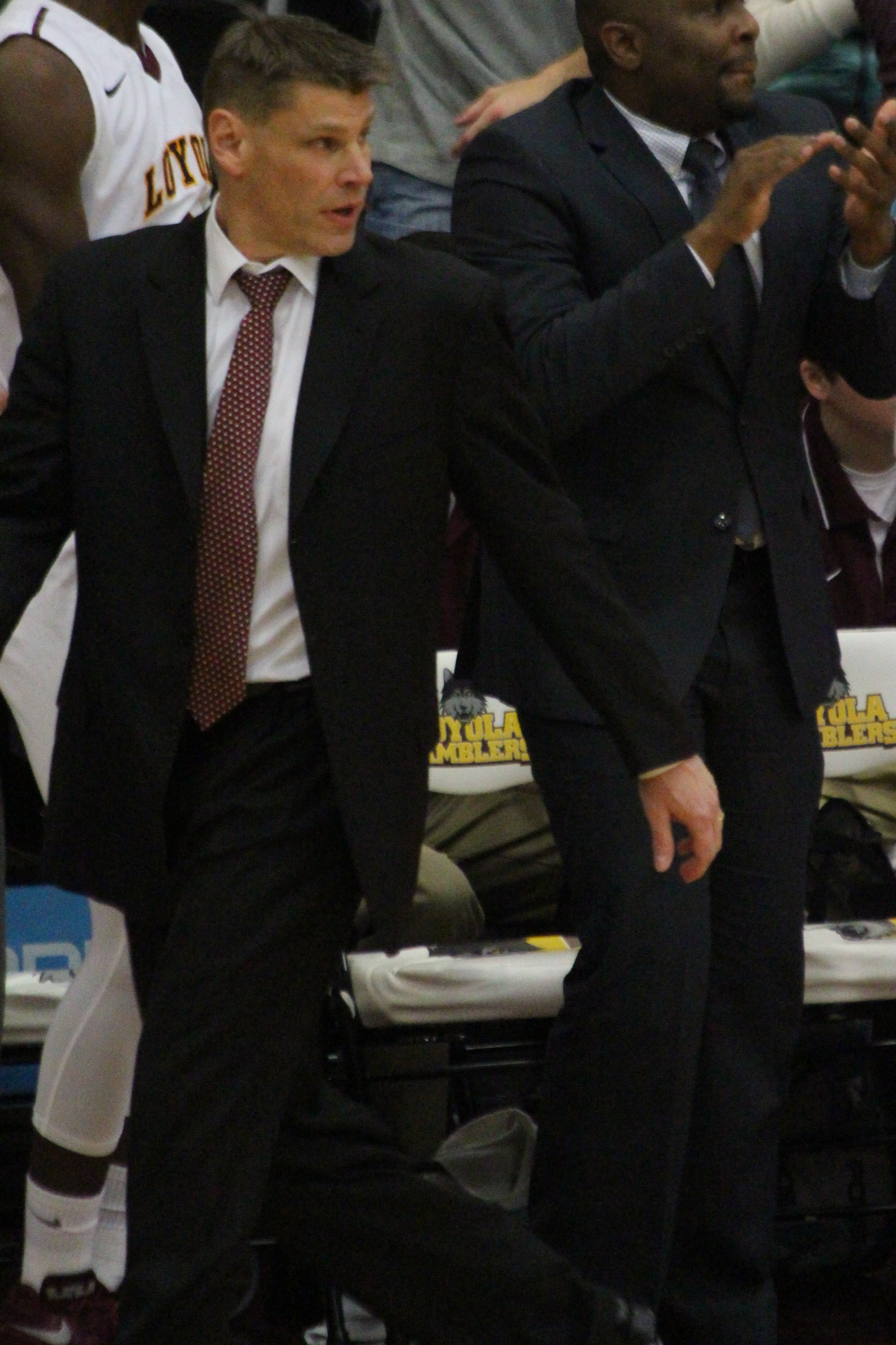
- Moser in 2015 (left)

Current position
- Title: Head coach
- Team: Oklahoma
- Conference: SEC
- Record: 97–76 (.561)
- Annual salary: $2 million

Biographical details
- Born: August 24, 1968 (age 58); Naperville, Illinois, U.S.

Playing career
- 1986–1990: Creighton

Coaching career (HC unless noted)
- 1990–1991: Creighton (assistant)
- 1991–1995: Texas A&M (assistant)
- 1995–1996: Milwaukee (assistant)
- 1996–1998: Texas A&M (assistant)
- 1998–2000: Arkansas–Little Rock (assistant)
- 2000–2003: Arkansas–Little Rock
- 2003–2007: Illinois State
- 2007–2008: Saint Louis (assistant)
- 2008–2011: Saint Louis (associate HC)
- 2011–2021: Loyola Chicago
- 2021–present: Oklahoma

Head coaching record
- Overall: 390–318 (.551)
- Tournaments: 6–3 (NCAA Division I); 1–2 (NIT); 5–0 (CBI); 2–1 (CBC)

Accomplishments and honors

Championships
- NCAA Division I regional – Final Four (2018); CBI (2015); 2 MVC tournament (2018, 2021); 3 MVC regular season (2018, 2019, 2021)

Awards
- MVC Coach of the Year (2018)

Porter Andrew Moser (born August 24, 1968) is a college basketball coach who is the current head coach of the University of Oklahoma men's basketball team. Moser spent 10 years (2011–2021) at Loyola University Chicago, helping lead the Ramblers to the Final Four in 2018.

Originally from Naperville, Illinois, Moser attended and played varsity basketball at Benet Academy, and then Creighton University. Moser previously held the head coaching position at Illinois State (2003–2007) and Arkansas-Little Rock (2000–2003). Prior to being hired at Loyola, Moser was an assistant coach at Saint Louis under Rick Majerus for the 2007-08 season, and the associate head coach from 2008-11.

== Playing career ==
During his high school career, Moser helped lead Benet Academy in suburban Lisle to a 70-14 (.833) record in three years on the varsity roster, playing for coach Bill Geist. The Naperville native led Benet to three West Suburban Catholic Conference titles and was a three-time all-conference and two-time all-area selection. As a senior, he was named Most Valuable Player in the West Suburban Catholic Conference. On May 6, 2017, he was inducted into the Illinois Basketball Coaches Association (IBCA) Hall of Fame.

Moser went on to play college basketball at Creighton University for coach Tony Barone, where he helped the Bluejays to a Missouri Valley Conference Championship and NCAA Tournament appearance in 1989. He played in 102 games including 27 starts, averaging 4.6 points and 1.7 assists per game during his collegiate career.

== Coaching career ==
=== Assistant ===
After graduating from Creighton, Moser began his coaching career in the 1990–91 season as a graduate assistant at Creighton under Tony Barone. Following Barone to Texas A&M, Moser was an assistant there from 1991 to 1995 and helped Texas A&M make its first postseason appearance in seven years, in the 1994 National Invitation Tournament. After serving as an assistant at Milwaukee in the 1995–96 season, Moser returned to Texas A&M for what would become Barone's final two seasons as head coach from 1996 to 1998.

From 1998 to 2000, Moser was an assistant coach at Arkansas–Little Rock, under Wimp Sanderson in his first season and Sidney Moncrief in his second.

=== Arkansas–Little Rock ===
Moser's first head coaching job was with Arkansas–Little Rock from 2000 to 2003. Inheriting a 4-24 team, Moser led the Trojans to an 18-11 record in his first season and finished with an overall 54-34 record. Statistically, the Trojans moved from last to first in the Sun Belt Conference in field goal percentage defense and three-point field goal percentage defense in Moser's first season in 2000–01.

=== Illinois State ===
Moser was the head coach at Illinois State from 2003 to 2007. After finishing the 2003-04 season 10-19, Moser led Illinois State to a 17-13 overall record and sixth-place finish in the Missouri Valley Conference (MVC). However, Illinois State dropped to 9-19 in 2005-06 season, including a 1–9 finish.

Despite an improvement to 15–16 in 2006-07 season, Illinois State lost in the first round of the MVC Tournament for the 3rd consecutive season. Seeking a change "in the overall direction of the program," Illinois State Athletics Director Sheahon Zenger fired Moser and terminated the contracts of Moser's three assistant coaches on March 5, 2007.

=== Saint Louis ===
Ranked in the top 50 Division I assistant coaches by Basketball Times in 2009, Moser was an assistant coach at Saint Louis under Rick Majerus from 2007 to 2011, including as associate head coach from 2008 to 2011. In 2009–10, Saint Louis finished 23-13 and as CBI runners-up.

=== Loyola Chicago ===
On April 5, 2011, Loyola University Chicago named Moser head coach of the Loyola Ramblers men's basketball team. Moser's hire followed the firing of Jim Whitesell, who went 109–107 in seven seasons. In his introductory press conference, Moser said that he aspired to make Loyola Chicago into a Horizon League contender similar to Butler.

Under Moser, Loyola Chicago went 7–23 in the 2011–12 season and 15–16 in 2012–13 before moving from the Horizon League to the Missouri Valley Conference (MVC) in 2013. In its first season in the MVC, Loyola Chicago went 10–22. Moser's fourth season was his first at Loyola Chicago with a winning record, at 24–13 (8–10 MVC) and the College Basketball Invitational title following a two-game sweep of Louisiana–Monroe. After a 15–17 season in 2015–16, Loyola Chicago had its second winning season under Moser in 2016–17 with an 18–14 (8–10 MVC) record.

==== 2018 Final Four run ====
Moser had his most successful season at Loyola Chicago in 2017–18, with a 32–6 (15–3 MVC) record, MVC regular season and tournament titles, and appearance in the Final Four as a no. 11 seed.

The MVC preseason poll picked Loyola Chicago to finish third, with one vote picking Loyola Chicago for first place. On December 6, 2017, Loyola Chicago beat a top-five team for the first time since the 1984–85 season after a 65-59 away upset of no. 5 Florida. On March 4, 2018, Loyola Chicago defeated Moser's former school Illinois State 65-49 in the MVC tournament final to qualify for the NCAA tournament for the first time since 1985.

Entering the NCAA Tournament as a no. 11 seed, Loyola Chicago had close upset victories in the first three rounds, 64-62 over no. 6 Miami (FL) in the Round of 64, 63-62 over no. 3 Tennessee in the Round of 32, and 69-68 over no. 7 Nevada in the Sweet 16. The win over Nevada was the 30th overall win for Loyola Chicago, enough for the most wins in program history.

Loyola Chicago advanced to its first Final Four since the 1963 national title year, after a 78-62 win over no. 9 Kansas State. Loyola became only the fourth no. 11 seed to reach the Final Four, after LSU in 1986, George Mason in 2006, and VCU in 2011. On March 31, Loyola Chicago lost to no. 3 Michigan 69-57 in their Final Four game held at the Alamodome in San Antonio.

Prior to Final Four weekend, Moser expressed hope that his team's run in the tournament would make it easier for other mid-major programs to earn at-large NCAA Tournament bids.

==== Recruiting Chicago-area players ====
Moser had success drawing recruits from the Chicago area talent pool. Former players Milton Doyle (Marshall), Donte Ingram (Simeon), Christian Negron (Elgin), and Cameron Krutwig (Jacobs) as well as 2021-22 players Lucas Williamson (Whitney Young), Nick DiNardi (Providence Catholic), Marquise Kennedy (Brother Rice) and Tom Welch (Naperville North) were all from the Chicago area.

=== Oklahoma ===
On April 2, 2021, Moser accepted the head coaching position at the University of Oklahoma, succeeding retired coach Lon Kruger. Moser agreed to a 6-year contract with the Sooners. He was officially announced as the Sooners' head coach in a press conference on April 7.

== Broadcasting ==
During the 2019 NCAA tournament, Moser signed on with CBS and Turner as a guest TV studio analyst for the second round of the tournament.

== Personal life ==
Moser and his wife Megan have four children: Jordan, Jake, Ben, and Max.

== Head coaching record ==
Record table
Season	Team	Overall	Conference	Standing	Postseason
Arkansas–Little Rock Trojans (Sun Belt Conference) (2000–2003)
2000–01	Arkansas–Little Rock	18–11	9–7	7th	
2001–02	Arkansas–Little Rock	18–11	8–6	5th	
2002–03	Arkansas–Little Rock	18–12	8–6	5th	
Arkansas–Little Rock:		54–34 (.614)	25–19 (.568)		
Illinois State Redbirds (Missouri Valley Conference) (2003–2007)
2003–04	Illinois State	10–19	4–14	10th	
2004–05	Illinois State	17–13	8–10	6th	
2005–05	Illinois State	9–19	4–14	10th	
2006–07	Illinois State	15–16	6–12	8th	
Illinois State:		51–67 (.432)	22–50 (.306)		
Loyola Ramblers (Horizon League) (2011–2013)
2011–12	Loyola Chicago	7–23	1–17	10th	
2012–13	Loyola Chicago	15–16	5–11	7th	
Loyola Ramblers (Missouri Valley Conference) (2013–2021)
2013–14	Loyola Chicago	10–22	4–14	10th	
2014–15	Loyola Chicago	24–13	8–10	6th	CBI Champion
2015–16	Loyola Chicago	15–17	7–11	8th	
2016–17	Loyola Chicago	18–14	8–10	5th	
2017–18	Loyola Chicago	32–6	15–3	1st	NCAA Division I Final Four
2018–19	Loyola Chicago	20–14	12–6	T–1st	NIT First Round
2019–20	Loyola Chicago	21–11	13–5	2nd	No postseason held
2020–21	Loyola Chicago	26–5	16–2	1st	NCAA Division I Sweet 16
Loyola Chicago:		188–141 (.571)	89–89 (.500)		
Oklahoma Sooners (Big 12 Conference) (2021–2024)
2021–22	Oklahoma	19–16	7–11	T–7th	NIT Second Round
2022–23	Oklahoma	15–17	5–13	T–9th	
2023–24	Oklahoma	20–12	8–10	T–9th	
Oklahoma Sooners (Southeastern Conference) (2024–present)
2024–25	Oklahoma	20–14	6–12	T–13th	NCAA Division I Round of 64
2025–26	Oklahoma	21–16	7–11	T–11th	CBC Runner-Up
2026–27	Oklahoma	2–1	0–0		
Oklahoma:		97–76 (.561)	32–56 (.364)		
Total:		390–318 (.551)	168–214 (.440)		
National champion Postseason invitational champion Conference regular season champion Conference regular season and conference tournament champion Division regular season champion Division regular season and conference tournament champion Conference tournament champion

== See also ==
- List of NCAA Division I Men's Final Four appearances by coach
