= 2004–05 Southern Illinois Salukis men's basketball team =

American college basketball season

2004–05 Southern Illinois Salukis men's basketball

MVC Regular season champion

NCAA tournament, second round
- Conference: Missouri Valley Conference
- Record: 27–8 (15–3 MVC)
- Head coach: Chris Lowery (1st season)
- Home arena: SIU Arena

2004–05 Missouri Valley Conference men's basketball standings
	Conf.				Overall
Team	W		L	PCT	W		L	PCT
Southern Illinois	15	–	3	.833	27	–	8	.771
Wichita State	12	–	6	.667	22	–	10	.688
Creighton †	11	–	7	.611	23	–	11	.676
Northern Iowa	11	–	7	.611	21	–	11	.656
Southwest Missouri State	10	–	8	.556	19	–	13	.594
Illinois State	8	–	10	.444	17	–	13	.567
Drake	7	–	11	.389	13	–	16	.448
Bradley	6	–	12	.333	13	–	15	.464
Indiana State	5	–	13	.278	11	–	20	.355
Evansville	5	–	13	.278	11	–	17	.393
† 2005 Missouri Valley Tournament winner Rankings from AP Poll

The 2004–05 Southern Illinois Salukis men's basketball team represented Southern Illinois University Carbondale during the 2004–05 NCAA Division I men's basketball season. The Salukis were led by first-year head coach Chris Lowery and played their home games at the SIU Arena in Carbondale, Illinois as members of the Missouri Valley Conference. They finished the season 27–8, 15–3 in MVC play to finish atop the regular season standings. The Salukis were eliminated in the semifinal round of the MVC tournament, but received an at-large bid to the NCAA tournament as No. 7 seed in the Chicago region. The Salukis defeated No. 10 seed Saint Mary's before falling to No. 2 seed Oklahoma State in the round of 32.

== Roster ==
2004–05 Southern Illinois Salukis men's basketball team
Players
Coaches

Pos.	#	Name	Height	Weight	Year	Previous school	Hometown
G	1	Darren Brooks	6 ft 3 in (1.91 m)	205 lb (93 kg)	Sr	Jennings	St. Louis, Missouri
G	3	Jamaal Tatum	6 ft 2 in (1.88 m)	175 lb (79 kg)	So	Helias Catholic	Jefferson City, Missouri
F	14	Randal Falker	6 ft 7 in (2.01 m)	235 lb (107 kg)	Fr	Gateway	St. Louis, Missouri

Head coach

- Chris Lowery (Southern Illinois)

Assistant coach(es)

Legend

- (C) Team captain
- (S) Suspended
- (I) Ineligible
- (W) Walk-on
- Injured
- Current redshirt

Roster

== Schedule and results ==
Date time, TV	Rank^{#}	Opponent^{#}	Result	Record	Site (attendance) city, state
Regular season
Nov 21, 2004*		Augustana (IL)	W 83–59	1–0	SIU Arena; Carbondale, Illinois
Nov 23, 2004*		Tennessee State	W 83–60	2–0	SIU Arena; Carbondale, Illinois
Nov 26, 2004*		vs. Vanderbilt	W 67–53	3–0	Valley High School; Las Vegas, Nevada
Nov 27, 2004*		vs. UTEP	W 68–62	4–0	Valley High School; Las Vegas, Nevada
Nov 29, 2004*		at Hawaii	L 64–66	4–1	Stan Sheriff Center; Honolulu, Hawaii
Dec 7, 2004*		at Little Rock	L 53–70	4–2	Alltel Arena; Little Rock, Arkansas
Dec 11, 2004*		Murray State	W 80–71	5–2	SIU Arena; Carbondale, Illinois
Dec 14, 2004*		Wright State	W 54–42	6–2	SIU Arena; Carbondale, Illinois
Dec 18, 2004*		at Southeast Missouri State	W 72–68	7–2	Show Me Center; Cape Girardeau, Missouri
Dec 21, 2004*		Saint Louis	W 67–41	8–2	SIU Arena; Carbondale, Illinois
Dec 23, 2004		Illinois State	W 61–49	9–2 (1–0)	SIU Arena; Carbondale, Illinois
Dec 30, 2004*		Wyoming	W 81–69	10–2	SIU Arena; Carbondale, Illinois
Jan 2, 2005*		Drake	W 51–45	11–2 (2–0)	SIU Arena; Carbondale, Illinois
Jan 5, 2005*		at Louisiana-Lafayette	L 61–63	11–3	Cajundome; Lafayette, Louisiana
Jan 9, 2005		at Creighton	W 69–63	12–3 (3–0)	Qwest Center Omaha; Omaha, Nebraska
Jan 12, 2005		at Evansville	W 69–57	13–3 (4–0)	Roberts Stadium; Evansville, Indiana
Jan 15, 2005		Southwest Missouri State	W 61–60	14–3 (5–0)	SIU Arena; Carbondale, Illinois
Jan 19, 2005		Bradley	W 67–59	15–3 (6–0)	SIU Arena; Carbondale, Illinois
Jan 22, 2005		at Wichita State	L 56–58	15–4 (6–1)	Charles Koch Arena; Wichita, Kansas
Jan 26, 2005		at Southwest Missouri State	L 77–92	15–5 (6–2)	Hammons Student Center; Springfield, Missouri
Jan 29, 2005		Evansville	W 79–55	16–5 (7–2)	SIU Arena; Carbondale, Illinois
Feb 2, 2005		at Bradley	W 89–73	17–5 (8–2)	Carver Arena; Peoria, Illinois
Feb 5, 2005		at Northern Iowa	L 61–67	17–6 (8–3)	UNI-Dome; Cedar Falls, Iowa
Feb 7, 2005		at Drake	W 58–57	18–6 (9–3)	Knapp Center; Des Moines, Iowa
Feb 9, 2005		Indiana State	W 64–53	19–6 (10–3)	SIU Arena; Carbondale, Illinois
Feb 12, 2005		Creighton	W 71–67	20–6 (11–3)	SIU Arena; Carbondale, Illinois
Feb 16, 2005		at Illinois State	W 66–59	21–6 (12–3)	Redbird Arena; Normal, Illinois
Feb 19, 2005*		at Kent State	W 65–54	22–6	Memorial Athletic and Convocation Center; Kent, Ohio
Feb 23, 2005		Northern Iowa	W 76–69	23–6 (13–3)	SIU Arena; Carbondale, Illinois
Feb 26, 2005		Wichita State	W 65–55	24–6 (14–3)	SIU Arena; Carbondale, Illinois
Feb 28, 2005		at Indiana State	W 60–52	25–6 (15–3)	Hulman Center; Terre Haute, Indiana
Missouri Valley tournament
Mar 5, 2005*		vs. Indiana State; Quarterfinals	W 64–49	26–6	Scottrade Center; St. Louis, Missouri
Mar 6, 2005*		vs. Southwest Missouri State; Semifinals	L 61–65	26–7	Scottrade Center; St. Louis, Missouri
NCAA tournament
Mar 18, 2005*	(7 CHI)	vs. (10 CHI) Saint Mary's; First Round	W 65–56	27–7	Ford Center; Oklahoma City, OK
Mar 20, 2005*	(7 CHI)	vs. (2 CHI) No. 6 Oklahoma State; Second Round	L 77–85	27–8	Ford Center; Oklahoma City, OK
*Non-conference game. ^{#}Rankings from AP poll. (#) Tournament seedings in parentheses. CHI=Chicago. All times are in Central Time.

== Awards and honors ==
- Darren Brooks – MVC Player of the Year (second time)
- Chris Lowery – MVC Coach of the Year (third straight season a different Saluki head coach received the honor – Bruce Weber and Matt Painter)
