= 2004–05 Illinois State Redbirds men's basketball team =

American college basketball season

2004–05 Illinois State Redbirds men's basketball
- Conference: Missouri Valley Conference
- Record: 17–13 (8–10 MVC)
- Head coach: Porter Moser (2nd season)
- Assistant coaches: Brian Barone; Daniyal Robinson; Chris Jans
- Home arena: Redbird Arena

2004–05 Missouri Valley Conference men's basketball standings
	Conf.				Overall
Team	W		L	PCT	W		L	PCT
Southern Illinois	15	–	3	.833	27	–	8	.771
Wichita State	12	–	6	.667	22	–	10	.688
Creighton †	11	–	7	.611	23	–	11	.676
Northern Iowa	11	–	7	.611	21	–	11	.656
Southwest Missouri State	10	–	8	.556	19	–	13	.594
Illinois State	8	–	10	.444	17	–	13	.567
Drake	7	–	11	.389	13	–	16	.448
Bradley	6	–	12	.333	13	–	15	.464
Indiana State	5	–	13	.278	11	–	20	.355
Evansville	5	–	13	.278	11	–	17	.393
† 2005 Missouri Valley Tournament winner Rankings from AP Poll

The 2004–05 Illinois State Redbirds men's basketball team represented Illinois State University during the 2004–05 NCAA Division I men's basketball season. The Redbirds, led by second year head coach Porter Moser, played their home games at Redbird Arena and competed as a member of the Missouri Valley Conference.

They finished the season 17–13, 8–10 in conference play to finish in sixth place. They were the number six seed for the Missouri Valley Conference tournament. They were defeated by Creighton University in their quarterfinal game.

== Roster ==
2004–05 Illinois State Redbirds men's basketball team
Players
Coaches

Pos.	#	Name	Height	Weight	Year	Hometown
G	2	Gregg Alexander	6 ft 4 in (1.93 m)	—	Sr	Lincoln, IL
G	11	Vince Greene	5 ft 9 in (1.75 m)	—	Sr	Chicago, IL
G	24	Trey Guidry	6 ft 2 in (1.88 m)	—	Sr	Baton Rouge, LA
G	25	Neil Plank	6 ft 5 in (1.96 m)	—	RS Jr	Mt. Zion, IL
G	31	Dana Ford	6 ft 4 in (1.93 m)	—	Jr	Tamms, IL
F	1	Lorenzo Gordon	6 ft 7 in (2.01 m)	—	Jr	St. Louis, MO
F	3	Nedu Onyeuku	6 ft 3 in (1.91 m)	—	Jr	Omaha, NE
G	14	Travis Wallace	6 ft 0 in (1.83 m)	—	Jr	St. Louis, MO
F	50	Greg Dilligard	6 ft 8 in (2.03 m)	—	So	La Belle, MO
G	12	Micah Kirstein	6 ft 3 in (1.91 m)	—	So	Herscher, IL
C	51	Ronnie Carlwell	6 ft 11 in (2.11 m)	—	RS Fr	Maywood, IL
C	32	Levi Dyer	6 ft 11 in (2.11 m)	—	Fr	Eaton, CO
G	5	Khalif Ford	6 ft 1 in (1.85 m)	—	Fr	Diamond Bar, CA

Head coach

- Porter Moser (Creighton)

Assistant coach(es)

- Brian Barone (Marquette)
- Daniyal Robinson (Little Rock)
- Chris Jans (Loras)

Legend

- (C) Team captain
- (S) Suspended
- (I) Ineligible
- (W) Walk-on
- Injured
- Current redshirt

== Schedule ==
Date time, TV	Rank^{#}	Opponent^{#}	Result	Record	High points	High rebounds	High assists	Site (attendance) city, state
Regular Season
November 14, 2004*; 5:30 pm		vs. Penn State; Black Coaches Association Classic [Quarterfinal]	W 82–73	1–0	26 – Gordon	8 – Greene	6 – Greene	Bradley Center (7,919); Milwaukee, WI
November 15, 2004*; 8:00 pm		at Marquette; Black Coaches Association Classic [Semifinal]	L 32–60	1–1	8 – Onyeuku	6 – Carlwell	2 – Guidry	Bradley Center (8,203); Milwaukee, WI
November 16, 2004*; 5:30 pm		vs. Mississippi; Black Coaches Association Classic [Third Place]	W 70–52	2–1	24 – Guidry	11 – Dilligard	3 – K.Ford	Bradley Center (8,203); Milwaukee, WI
November 22, 2004*; 7:05 pm		Truman State	W 82–47	3–1	16 – Gordon	8 – Guidry	5 – Alexander, Greene	Redbird Arena (4,127); Normal, IL
November 27, 2004*; 1:05 pm		Tennessee–Martin	W 80–51	4–1	27 – Guidry	7 – Alexander	7 – Greene	Redbird Arena (4,051); Normal, IL
November 30, 2004*; 7:05 pm		Illinois–Chicago	L 56–60	4–2	13 – Gordon	6 – Gordon	7 – Greene	Redbird Arena (6,260); Normal, IL
December 4, 2004*; 7:05 pm		St. John's	W 77–69	5–2	22 – Gordon	8 – Guidry	6 – Greene	Redbird Arena (8,044); Normal, IL
December 7, 2004*; 7:05 pm		Alcorn State	W 75–62	6–2	19 – Gordon	7 – Gordon, Dilligard	6 – Greene	Redbird Arena (5,943); Normal, IL
December 11, 2004*; 7:05 pm		Marshall	W 79–67	7–2	21 – Plank	8 – Plank	10 – Alexander	Redbird Arena (6,689); Normal, IL
December 18, 2004*; 1:00 pm		at Loyola–Chicago	W 73–67	8–2	19 – Gordon	11 – Dilligard	5 – Greene	Joseph J. Gentile Center (3,871); Chicago, IL
December 23, 2004; 7:05 pm		at Southern Illinois	L 49–61	8–3 (0–1)	13 – Gordon	5 – Onyeuku, Plank	5 – Greene	SIU Arena (5,729); Carbondale, IL
December 30, 2004; 7:05 pm		Southwest Missouri State	W 62–61	9–3 (1–1)	17 – Gordon	10 – Dilligard	4 – Dilligard	Redbird Arena (5,965); Normal, IL
January 3, 2005; 7:05 pm		at Northern Iowa	L 55–75	9–4 (1–2)	20 – Guidry	5 – Gordon	2 – Gordon	UNI Dome (3,126); Cedar Falls, IA
January 6, 2005; 7:05 pm		Indiana State	W 62–61	10–4 (2–2)	20 – Gordon	7 – Plank	6 – K.Ford	Redbird Arena (4,923); Normal, IL
January 9, 2005; 2:05 pm		at Evansville	L 61–69	10–5 (2–3)	24 – Gordon	14 – Gordon	3 – Greene	Roberts Municipal Stadium (5,709); Evansville, IN
January 15, 2005; 4:05 pm		Drake	W 74–61	11–5 (3–3)	21 – Gordon	13 – Gordon	6 – Alexander	Redbird Arena (5,636); Normal, IL
January 19, 2005; 6:05 pm		at Indiana State	W 73–69	12–5 (4–3)	26 – Gordon	7 – Gordon	10 – Greene	Hulman Center (3,334); Terre Haute, IN
January 22, 2005; 7:05 pm		at Creighton	W 82–77 ^{OT}	13–5 (5–3)	30 – Guidry	11 – Gordon	5 – Greene	Qwest Center Omaha (13,949); Omaha, NE
January 25, 2005; 7:05 pm		Evansville	W 77–58	14–5 (6–3)	25 – Guidry	7 – Alexander	6 – Greene	Redbird Arena (5,709); Normal, IL
January 29, 2005; 6:05 pm		at Wichita State	L 72–78	14–6 (6–4)	19 – Greene, Guidry	7 – Dilligard	3 – Gordon	Charles Koch Arena (10,478); Wichita, KS
February 1, 2005; 7:05 pm		at Drake	W 59–58	15–6 (7–4)	19 – Gordon	9 – Gordon	6 – Guidry	The Knapp Center (5,311); Des Monies, IA
February 5, 2005; 4:05 pm, WMBD		Bradley	W 69–62	16–6 (8–4)	24 – Guidry	6 – Alexander, Dilligard	4 – Greene	Redbird Arena (10,200); Normal, IL
February 10, 2005; 7:05 pm		Wichita State	L 62–76	16–7 (8–5)	20 – Gordon	6 – Gordon	5 – Guidry	Redbird Arena (7,115); Normal, IL
February 12, 2005; 4:05 pm		Northern Iowa	L 64–65	16–8 (8–6)	20 – Guidry	8 – Gordon	4 – K.Ford	Redbird Arena (8,396); Normal, IL
February 16, 2005; 7:05 pm		Southern Illinois	L 59–66	16–9 (8–7)	13 – Gordon	9 – Alexander	4 – Gordon	Redbird Arena (7,547); Normal, IL
February 19, 2005*; 8:00 pm, WMBD/ESPN+		at Wisconsin–Green Bay; Bracket Buster Saturday	W 79–69	17–9	22 – Gordon	9 – Gordon	8 – Greene	Resch Center (6,023); Ashwaubenon, WI
February 23, 2005; 7:35 pm, WEEK		at Bradley	L 61–77	17–10 (8–8)	17 – Greene	9 – Gordon	3 – Alexander, Greene	Carver Arena (10,406); Peoria, IL
February 26, 2005; 7:05 pm		at Southwest Missouri State	L 66–77	17–11 (8–9)	16 – Greene, Guidry	5 – Ford	4 – Greene	John Q. Hammons Student Center (7,036); Springfield, MO
February 28, 2005; 7:05 pm		Creighton	L 59–64	17–12 (8–10)	14 – Greene	8 – Guidry	5 – Greene	Redbird Arena (6,155); Normal, IL
State Farm Missouri Valley Conference {MVC} tournament
March 6, 2005*; 8:35 pm	(6)	vs. (3) Creighton; Quarterfinal	L 52–69	17–13	16 – Guidry	4 – Gordon, Plank	5 – Greene	Savvis Center (10,854); St. Louis, MO
*Non-conference game. ^{#}Rankings from AP Poll. (#) Tournament seedings in parentheses. All times are in Central Standard Time.
