= 2004 Horizon League men's basketball tournament =

- Classification: Division I
- Season: 2003–04
- Teams: 9
- First round site: campus sites
- Quarterfinals site: Hinkle Fieldhouse; Indianapolis, Indiana
- Semifinals site: Hinkle Fieldhouse; Indianapolis, IN
- Finals site: U.S. Cellular Arena; Milwaukee, Wisconsin
- Champions: UIC (2nd title)
- Winning coach: Jimmy Collins (2nd title)
- MVP: Armond Williams (UIC)

2003–04 Horizon League men's basketball standings
	Conf.				Overall
Team	W		L	PCT	W		L	PCT
Milwaukee	13	–	3	.813	20	–	11	.645
Illinois-Chicago †	12	–	4	.750	24	–	8	.750
Green Bay	11	–	5	.688	17	–	11	.607
Detroit Mercy	10	–	6	.625	19	–	11	.633
Wright State	10	–	6	.625	14	–	14	.500
Butler	8	–	8	.500	16	–	14	.533
Youngstown State	4	–	12	.250	8	–	20	.286
Loyola Chicago	4	–	12	.250	9	–	20	.310
Cleveland State	0	–	16	.000	4	–	25	.138
† 2004 Horizon League Tournament winner

The 2004 Horizon League men's basketball tournament took place at the end of the 2003–04 regular season. The better seed hosted each first round match. Butler hosted the second round and semifinals. As the highest remaining seed, Milwaukee hosted the championship game.

== Seeds ==
All Horizon League schools played in the tournament. Teams were seeded by 2003–04 Horizon League season record, with a tiebreaker system to seed teams with identical conference records. The top 2 teams received a bye to the semifinals and the third seed received a bye to the quarterfinals.

== Bracket ==
First Round; Tuesday, March 2
4	Detroit	62
9	Cleveland State	36
5	Wright State	59
8	Loyola	76
6	Butler	88
7	Youngstown State	57

Second Round; Friday, March 5
4	Detroit	60
8	Loyola	55
3	Green Bay	50
6	Butler	72

Semifinals; Saturday, March 6
1	Milwaukee	58
4	Detroit	50
2	UIC	65
6	Butler	56

Championship; Tuesday, March 9
1	Milwaukee	62
2	UIC	65

First round games at campus sites of higher seeds
Second round and semifinals hosted by Butler. Championship hosted by best remaining seed
