= 2004–05 Northern Iowa Panthers men's basketball team =

American college basketball season

2004–05 Northern Iowa Panthers men's basketball

NCAA tournament, first round
- Conference: Missouri Valley Conference
- Record: 21–11 (11–7 MVC)
- Head coach: Greg McDermott (4th season)
- Assistant coach: Ben Jacobson
- Home arena: UNI-Dome

2004–05 Missouri Valley Conference men's basketball standings
| | Conf. | | | | Overall |
| Team | W | | L | PCT | W | | L | PCT |
|---|---|---|---|---|---|---|---|---|
| Southern Illinois | 15 | – | 3 | .833 | 27 | – | 8 | .771 |
| Wichita State | 12 | – | 6 | .667 | 22 | – | 10 | .688 |
| Creighton † | 11 | – | 7 | .611 | 23 | – | 11 | .676 |
| Northern Iowa | 11 | – | 7 | .611 | 21 | – | 11 | .656 |
| Southwest Missouri State | 10 | – | 8 | .556 | 19 | – | 13 | .594 |
| Illinois State | 8 | – | 10 | .444 | 17 | – | 13 | .567 |
| Drake | 7 | – | 11 | .389 | 13 | – | 16 | .448 |
| Bradley | 6 | – | 12 | .333 | 13 | – | 15 | .464 |
| Indiana State | 5 | – | 13 | .278 | 11 | – | 20 | .355 |
| Evansville | 5 | – | 13 | .278 | 11 | – | 17 | .393 |
† 2005 Missouri Valley Tournament winner Rankings from AP Poll

The 2004–05 Northern Iowa Panthers men's basketball team represented the University of Northern Iowa during the 2004–05 NCAA Division I men's basketball season. The Panthers, led by fourth-year head coach Greg McDermott, played their home games at the UNI-Dome in Cedar Falls, Iowa and were members of the Missouri Valley Conference (The Valley). They finished the season 21–11, 11–7 in MVC play to finish in third place. They lost to SW Missouri State in the Missouri Valley tournament, but still received an at-large bid to the NCAA tournament where they were defeated by No. 6 seed Wisconsin in the opening round.

== Roster ==
2004–05 Northern Iowa Panthers men's basketball team
Players
Coaches

| Pos. | # | Name | Height | Weight | Year | Hometown |
|---|---|---|---|---|---|---|
| G | 12 | Ben Jacobson | 6 ft 3 in (1.91 m) | 205 lb (93 kg) | Jr | Sioux City, IA |
| G | 23 | Brooks McKowen | 6 ft 2 in (1.88 m) | 195 lb (88 kg) | So | Fairbank, IA |

Head coach

- Greg McDermott (Northern Iowa)

Assistant coach(es)

- Ben Jacobson (Northern Dakota)

Legend

- (C) Team captain
- (S) Suspended
- (I) Ineligible
- (W) Walk-on
- Injured
- Current redshirt

Roster

== Schedule and results ==
| Date time, TV | Rank^{#} | Opponent^{#} | Result | Record | Site (attendance) city, state |
Non-conference regular season
| Nov 21, 2004* | | Wayne State (NE) | W 84–66 | 1–0 | UNI-Dome (3,016); Cedar Falls, Iowa |
| Nov 24, 2004* | | at Cincinnati | L 70–76 ^{2OT} | 1–1 | Myrl H. Shoemaker Center (10,177); Cincinnati, Ohio |
| Dec 1, 2004* | | Iowa State; Iowa Big Four | W 99–82 | 2–1 | UNI-Dome (7,615); Cedar Falls, Iowa |
| Dec 4, 2004* | | at Loyola–Chicago | W 80–73 | 3–1 | Joseph J. Gentile Center (2,804); Chicago, Illinois |
| Dec 7, 2004* | | at No. 17 Iowa | L 73–76 | 3–2 | Carver-Hawkeye Arena (10,349); Iowa City, Iowa |
| Dec 11, 2004* | | at UMKC | W 81–58 | 4–2 | Municipal Auditorium (3,969); Kansas City, Missouri |
| Dec 15, 2004* | | Green Bay | W 76–65 | 5–2 | UNI-Dome (4,104); Cedar Falls, Iowa |
| Dec 21, 2004* | | Wagner | W 86–56 | 6–2 | UNI-Dome (3,142); Cedar Falls, Iowa |
| Dec 23, 2004* | | Longwood | W 84–63 | 7–2 | UNI-Dome (4,217); Cedar Falls, Iowa |
| Dec 30, 2004* | | vs. Valparaiso | W 67–49 | 8–2 | Valley High School (750); Las Vegas, Nevada |
| Dec 31, 2004* | | vs. Northwestern State | W 69–62 | 9–2 | Valley High School (2,500); Las Vegas, Nevada |
Missouri Valley Conference Regular season
| Jan 3, 2005 | | Illinois State | W 75–55 | 10–2 (1–0) | UNI-Dome (3,126); Cedar Falls, Iowa |
| Jan 7, 2005 | | at Evansville | L 73–92 | 10–3 (1–1) | Roberts Municipal Stadium (5,871); Evansville, Indiana |
| Jan 9, 2005 | | at Indiana State | W 64–48 | 11–3 (2–1) | Hulman Center (3,163); Terre Haute, Indiana |
| Jan 12, 2005 | | SW Missouri State | W 68–63 | 12–3 (3–1) | UNI-Dome (4,416); Cedar Falls, Iowa |
| Jan 15, 2005 | | Creighton | L 66–67 | 12–4 (3–2) | UNI-Dome (6,769); Cedar Falls, Iowa |
| Feb 12, 2005 | | at Illinois State | W 65–64 | 17–8 (8–6) | Redbird Arena (8,396); Normal, Illinois |
| Feb 16, 2005 | | Drake | W 61–60 | 18–8 (9–6) | UNI-Dome (4,210); Cedar Falls, Iowa |
| Feb 19, 2005* | | Western Michigan | W 86–75 | 19–8 | UNI-Dome (6,476); Cedar Falls, Iowa |
| Feb 23, 2005 | | at Southern Illinois | L 69–76 | 19–9 (9–7) | SIU Arena (6,712); Carbondale, Illinois |
| Feb 26, 2005 | | Bradley | W 81–72 | 20–9 (10–7) | UNI-Dome (4,112); Cedar Falls, Iowa |
| Feb 28, 2005 | | at Wichita State | W 67–66 | 21–9 (11–7) | Charles Koch Arena (10,468); Wichita, Kansas |
Missouri Valley tournament
| Mar 5, 2005* | | vs. SW Missouri State; Quarterfinals | L 62–70 | 21–10 | Savvis Center (13,449); St. Louis, Missouri |
NCAA tournament
| Mar 18, 2005*; CBS | (11 E) | vs. (6 E) No. 20 Wisconsin; First round | L 52–57 | 21–11 | Ford Center (18,567); Oklahoma City, Oklahoma |
*Non-conference game. ^{#}Rankings from AP Poll. (#) Tournament seedings in parentheses. E=East. All times are in Central Time.
