= Jason Daisy =

American basketball player (born 1974)

Personal information
- Born: September 30, 1974 (age 52) Minneapolis, Minnesota, U.S.
- Listed height: 6 ft 3 in (1.91 m)
- Listed weight: 185 lb (84 kg)

Career information
- High school: South (Minneapolis, Minnesota)
- College: Northern Iowa (1992–1997)
- NBA draft: 1997: undrafted
- Position: Point guard

Career highlights
- MVC Player of the Year (1997); 2× First Team All-MVC (1996, 1997)

Jason Daisy (born September 30, 1974) is an American former professional basketball player. He enjoyed a career in various countries, including Israel and Belgium, despite never making a National Basketball Association (NBA) roster.

Daisy, a native of Minneapolis, Minnesota, attended Minneapolis South High School and graduated in 1992. He enrolled at University of Northern Iowa (UNI) where he would go on to play four years of basketball for the Panthers. A 6 ft 3 in (1.91 m) point guard, he was named the Missouri Valley Conference Men's Basketball Player of the Year as a senior in 1996–97. He was the first player from UNI to win the award at that point (Adam Koch became the second in 2009–10). In a game against Central Florida during his junior year, Daisy tied a school record with 21 free throw attempts. He also has the UNI record for the most career points against Missouri Valley Conference opponents only (1,121); his 1,721 overall career points rank him fourth all-time through the 2012–13 season.

Today he once again resides in Minneapolis in his post-professional basketball career. He also coaches high school basketball.
