= 2003–04 Illinois State Redbirds men's basketball team =

American college basketball season

2003–04 Illinois State Redbirds men's basketball
- Conference: Missouri Valley Conference
- Record: 10–19 (4–14 MVC)
- Head coach: Porter Moser (1st season)
- Assistant coaches: Steve Forbes; Brian Barone; Daniyal Robinson
- Home arena: Redbird Arena

2003–04 Missouri Valley Conference men's basketball standings
	Conf.				Overall
Team	W		L	PCT	W		L	PCT
No. 23 Southern Illinois	17	–	1	.944	25	–	5	.833
Northern Iowa †	12	–	6	.667	21	–	10	.677
Wichita State	12	–	6	.667	21	–	11	.656
Creighton	12	–	6	.667	20	–	9	.690
Southwest Missouri State	9	–	9	.500	19	–	14	.576
Drake	7	–	11	.389	12	–	16	.429
Bradley	7	–	11	.389	15	–	16	.484
Indiana State	5	–	13	.278	9	–	19	.321
Evansville	5	–	13	.278	7	–	22	.241
Illinois State	4	–	14	.222	10	–	19	.345
† 2004 Missouri Valley Tournament winner Rankings from AP Poll

The 2003–04 Illinois State Redbirds men's basketball team represented Illinois State University during the 2003–04 NCAA Division I men's basketball season. The Redbirds, led by first year head coach Porter Moser, played their home games at Redbird Arena and competed as a member of the Missouri Valley Conference.

They finished the season 10–19, 4–14 in conference play to finish in tenth place. They were the number ten seed for the Missouri Valley Conference tournament. They were victorious over Bradley University in their opening round game but were defeated by the University of Northern Iowa in their quarterfinal game.

== Roster ==
2003–04 Illinois State Redbirds men's basketball team
Players
Coaches

Pos.	#	Name	Height	Weight	Year	Hometown
G	2	Gregg Alexander	6 ft 4 in (1.93 m)	—	Jr	Lincoln, IL
F	33	Najeeb Echols	6 ft 7 in (2.01 m)	—	Jr	Chicago, IL
F	5	Kyle Flowers	6 ft 8 in (2.03 m)	—	Jr	Alexis, IL
G	11	Vince Greene	5 ft 9 in (1.75 m)	—	Jr	Chicago, IL
G	24	Trey Guidry	6 ft 2 in (1.88 m)	—	Jr	Baton Rouge, LA
F	34	Kenneth Hill	6 ft 6 in (1.98 m)	—	Jr	Naperville, IL
G	15	Matt Miller	5 ft 10 in (1.78 m)	—	Jr	Aurora, IL
G	25	Neil Plank	6 ft 5 in (1.96 m)	—	RS So	Mt. Zion, IL
G	10	Kevin Troc	6 ft 4 in (1.93 m)	—	RS So	Lockport, IL
F	21	Marcus Arnold	6 ft 8 in (2.03 m)	—	So	Chicago, IL
F	1	Chris Burras	6 ft 5 in (1.96 m)	—	So	Chicago, IL
G	3	Dana Ford	6 ft 4 in (1.93 m)	—	So	Tamms, IL
C	51	Ronnie Carlwell (redshirt)	6 ft 11 in (2.11 m)	—	Fr	Maywood, IL
F	50	Greg Dilligard	6 ft 8 in (2.03 m)	—	Fr	La Belle, MO
G	12	Micah Kirstein	6 ft 3 in (1.91 m)	—	Fr	Herscher, IL
F	45	Michael Sams	6 ft 7 in (2.01 m)	—	Fr	Mt. Zion, IL

Head coach

- Porter Moser (Creighton)

Assistant coach(es)

- Steve Forbes (Southern Arkansas)
- Brian Barone (Marquette)
- Daniyal Robinson (Little Rock)

Legend

- (C) Team captain
- (S) Suspended
- (I) Ineligible
- (W) Walk-on
- Injured
- Current redshirt

== Schedule ==
Date time, TV	Rank^{#}	Opponent^{#}	Result	Record	High points	High rebounds	High assists	Site (attendance) city, state
Regular Season
November 23, 2003*; 2:05 pm		Florida A&M	W 87–70	0–1	24 – Guidry	10 – Plank	6 – Plank	Redbird Arena (6,689); Normal, IL
November 26, 2003*; 7:05 pm		at Northern Illinois	L 55–66	1–1	20 – Alexander	9 – Arnold	3 – Dilligard	Convocation Center (2,888); DeKalb, IL
November 29, 2003*; 8:05 pm		at Utah State	L 84–89	1–2	21 – Plank	5 – Plank	4 – Plank	Dee Glen Smith Spectrum (6,184); Logan, UT
December 2, 2003*; 7:05 pm		Bellarmine	W 87–53	2–2	20 – Guidry	6 – Plank	5 – Burras, Plank	Redbird Arena (6,016); Normal, IL
December 6, 2003*; 7:05 pm		Eastern Michigan	W 80–69	3–2	27 – Guidry	9 – Dilligard	6 – Greene	Redbird Arena (6,909); Normal, IL
December 13, 2003*; 5:00 pm		at Illinois–Chicago	L 74–86	3–3	20 – Guidry	6 – Guidry, Plank	5 – Alexander, Guidry	UIC Pavilion (5,978); Chicago, IL
December 16, 2003*; 7:05 pm		Western Kentucky	W 66–65 ^{OT}	4–3	23 – Arnold	10 – Dilligard	6 – Troc	Redbird Arena (4,367); Normal, IL
December 20, 2003; 12:07 pm		Northern Iowa	L 61–64	4–4 (0–1)	13 – Guidry	7 – Arnold	6 – Greene	Redbird Arena (5,213); Normal, IL
December 28, 2003; 2:05 pm		at Southern Illinois	L 40–57	4–5 (0–2)	9 – Echols	5 – Echols	2 – Greene, Echols	SIU Arena (5,892); Carbondale, IL
January 3, 2004*; 1:00 pm		at No. 19 Illinois	L 73–80 ^{OT}	4–6	23 – Arnold	4 – Greene, Echols, Plank	10 – Greene	Assembly Hall (16,618); Champaign, IL
January 7, 2004; 7:05 pm		No. 23 Creighton	L 55–56	4–7 (0–3)	13 – Echols	12 – Arnold	5 – Alexander	Redbird Arena (5,282); Normal, IL
January 10, 2004; 6:05 pm		at Indiana State	L 49–56	4–8 (0–4)	15 – Arnold	7 – Burras, Dilligard	2 – Greene, Arnold, Burras	Hulman Center (4,188); Terre Haute, IN
January 14, 2004; 7:05 pm		at Drake	L 55–59	4–9 (0–5)	12 – Echols	5 – Echols	5 – Alexander	The Knapp Center (5,069); Des Monies, IA
January 18, 2004; 1:07 pm		Southwest Missouri State	W 54–42	5–9 (1–5)	16 – Arnold	6 – Alexander	4 – Greene	Redbird Arena (6,585); Normal, IL
January 21, 2004; 7:05 pm		Southern Illinois	L 58–71	5–10 (1–6)	18 – Arnold	11 – Plank	4 – Greene	Redbird Arena (7,124); Normal, IL
January 24, 2004; 7:07 pm		at No. 24 Creighton	L 63–72	5–11 (1–7)	16 – Guidry	5 – Echols, Arnold, Plank	5 – Greene	Qwest Center Omaha (14,313); Omaha, NE
January 28, 2004; 7:05 pm		at Northern Iowa	W 68–60	6–11 (2–7)	17 – Guidry	7 – Arnold	3 – Greene, Alexander	UNI Dome (2,684); Cedar Falls, IA
January 31, 2004; 4:05 pm, WMBD		Bradley	L 54–57	6–12 (2–8)	15 – Arnold	6 – Dilligard	2 – Greene, Arnold, Burras, Dilligard	Redbird Arena (9,074); Normal, IL
February 4, 2004; 7:05 pm		Wichita State	L 50–70	6–13 (2–9)	16 – Guidry	6 – Dilligard	2 – Dilligard	Redbird Arena (5,867); Normal, IL
February 7, 2004; 7:05 pm		at Southwest Missouri State	L 57–69	6–14 (2–10)	17 – Arnold	5 – Plank	4 – Greene	John Q. Hammons Student Center (6,854); Springfield, MO
February 11, 2004; 7:05 pm		at Evansville	L 48–79	6–15 (2–11)	16 – Echols	5 – Echols, Dilligard	3 – Echols	Roberts Municipal Stadium (5,327); Evansville, IN
February 14, 2004; 2:05 pm		Indiana State	W 63–37	7–15 (3–11)	21 – Guidry	4 – Arnold, Plank, Dilligard	5 – Greene	Redbird Arena (6,751); Normal, IL
February 18, 2004; 7:37 pm, WEEK		at Bradley	L 46–65	7–16 (3–12)	16 – Guidry	8 – Arnold	3 – Greene	Carver Arena (9,744); Peoria, IL
February 21, 2004*; 4:05 pm		Loyola–Chicago; Bracket Buster Saturday	W 77–71	8–16	21 – Guidry	6 – Greene, Guidry, Arnold	2 – Greene, Alexander, Arnold	Redbird Arena (6,507); Normal, IL
February 25, 2004; 7:05 pm		Evansville	L 56–72	8–17 (3–13)	15 – Guidry	5 – Echols, Dilligard	3 – Alexander, Echols	Redbird Arena (5,838); Normal, IL
February 28, 2004; 7:05 pm		at Wichita State	L 62–68	8–18 (3–14)	23 – Guidry	5 – Dilligard	7 – Greene	Charles Koch Arena (10,494); Wichita, KS
March 1, 2004; 7:05 pm		Drake	W 73–68	9–18 (4–14)	23 – Greene	5 – Dilligard	6 – Greene	Redbird Arena (5,415); Normal, IL
State Farm Missouri Valley Conference {MVC} tournament
March 5, 2004*; 2:37 pm	(10)	vs. (7) Bradley; Opening Round	W 76–56	10–18	22 – Guidry	11 – Echols	6 – Greene	Savvis Center (4,785); St. Louis, MO
March 6, 2004*; 6:07 pm	(10)	vs. (2) Northern Iowa; Quarterfinal	L 54–68	10–19	22 – Guidry	7 – Arnold	2 – Greene	Savvis Center (9,819); St. Louis, MO
*Non-conference game. ^{#}Rankings from AP Poll. (#) Tournament seedings in parentheses. All times are in Central Standard Time.
