= 2003–04 Butler Bulldogs men's basketball team =

American college basketball season

2003–04 Butler Bulldogs men's basketball
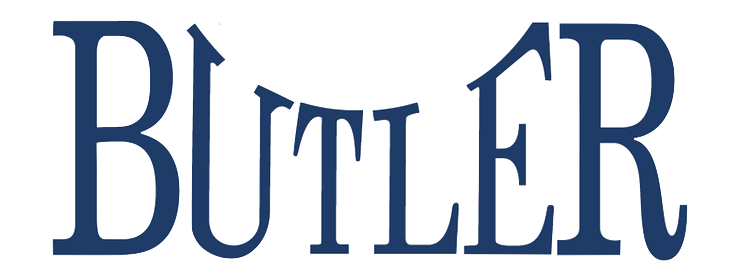
- Conference: Horizon League
- Record: 16–14 (8–8 Horizon)
- Head coach: Todd Lickliter
- Assistant coaches: Matthew Graves; Jeff Meyer; Brad Stevens

2003–04 Horizon League men's basketball standings
	Conf.				Overall
Team	W		L	PCT	W		L	PCT
Milwaukee	13	–	3	.813	20	–	11	.645
Illinois-Chicago †	12	–	4	.750	24	–	8	.750
Green Bay	11	–	5	.688	17	–	11	.607
Detroit Mercy	10	–	6	.625	19	–	11	.633
Wright State	10	–	6	.625	14	–	14	.500
Butler	8	–	8	.500	16	–	14	.533
Youngstown State	4	–	12	.250	8	–	20	.286
Loyola Chicago	4	–	12	.250	9	–	20	.310
Cleveland State	0	–	16	.000	4	–	25	.138
† 2004 Horizon League Tournament winner

The 2003–04 Butler Bulldogs men's basketball team represented Butler University in the 2003–04 NCAA Division I men's basketball season. Their head coach was Todd Lickliter, serving his 3rd year. The Bulldogs played their home games at Hinkle Fieldhouse.

== Roster ==
2003–04 Butler Bulldogs men's basketball team
Players
Coaches

Pos.	#	Name	Height	Weight	Year	Hometown
C	43	Jamie Smalligan	7 ft 0 in (2.13 m)	265 lb (120 kg)	Fr	East Grand Rapids, MI
G	21	Avery Sheets (C)	6 ft 0 in (1.83 m)	175 lb (79 kg)	So	Lafayette, IN
G	3	Bruce Horan (C)	6 ft 3 in (1.91 m)	195 lb (88 kg)	So	New Castle, IN
G	10	James Parker	6 ft 0 in (1.83 m)	175 lb (79 kg)	RS Jr	Chicago, IL
F	34	Jeff James	6 ft 6 in (1.98 m)	200 lb (91 kg)	So	Tampa, FL
F	31	Andy Grunst	6 ft 8 in (2.03 m)	240 lb (109 kg)	So	Milwaukee, WI
C	24	Brian Ligon	6 ft 7 in (2.01 m)	240 lb (109 kg)	Fr	St. Petersburg, FL
F	33	Brandon Crone	6 ft 6 in (1.98 m)	225 lb (102 kg)	Fr	Frankfort, IN
F	44	Nick Brooks	6 ft 5 in (1.96 m)	220 lb (100 kg)	Fr	Robinson, IL
G	22	Mike Monserez	6 ft 6 in (1.98 m)	235 lb (107 kg)	Sr	Cincinnati, OH
F	1	Duane Lightfoot	6 ft 5 in (1.96 m)	220 lb (100 kg)	Sr	Louisville, KY
G	30	Nick Gardner	6 ft 4 in (1.93 m)	215 lb (98 kg)	Sr	Indianapolis, IN
G	2	Ryan Reynolds	5 ft 10 in (1.78 m)	170 lb (77 kg)	Jr	Terre Haute, IN

Head coach

- Todd Lickliter (Butler)

Assistant coach(es)

- Matthew Graves (Butler)
- Jeff Meyer (Taylor)
- Brad Stevens (DePauw)

Legend

- (C) Team captain
- (S) Suspended
- (I) Ineligible
- (W) Walk-on
- Injured
- Current redshirt

Roster
Last update: 21 August 2012

== Schedule and results ==
Date time, TV	Rank^{#}	Opponent^{#}	Result	Record	Site city, state
Regular season
Nov 23, 2003*		Quincy	W 68–54	1–0	Hinkle Fieldhouse (3,506); Indianapolis, IN
Nov 25, 2003*		at Northern Iowa	W 56–54	2–0	UNI-Dome (3,641); Cedar Falls, IA
Nov 30, 2003*		vs. Michigan	L 60–61 ^{OT}	2–1	Conseco Fieldhouse (6,148); Indianapolis, IN
Dec 3, 2003*		at Ball State	L 61–63	2–2	Worthen Arena (7,254); Muncie, IN
Dec 6, 2003*		Evansville	W 65–64	3–2	Hinkle Fieldhouse (4,924); Indianapolis, IN
Dec 10, 2003*		at Bradley	L 55–59	3–3	Carver Arena (8,892); Peoria, IL
Dec 13, 2003*		at Indiana	L 50–62	3–4	Assembly Hall (17,282); Bloomington, IN
Dec 20, 2003*		Indiana State	W 57–39	4–4	Hinkle Fieldhouse (5,175); Indianapolis, IN
Dec 22, 2003		Green Bay	L 63–70	4–5 (0–1)	Hinkle Fieldhouse (4,524); Indianapolis, IN
Dec 27, 2003*		at St. Louis	L 54–72	4–6	Scottrade Center (8,938); St. Louis, MO
Jan 3, 2004		at Wright State	L 39–51	4–7 (0–2)	Nutter Center (4,406); Fairborn, OH
Jan 8, 2004		at Milwaukee	L 59–71	4–8 (0–3)	US Cellular Arena (4,207); Milwaukee, WI
Jan 10, 2004		at Green Bay	L 50–60	4–9 (0–4)	Resch Center (4,643); Ashwaubenon, WI
Jan 15, 2004		Loyola (IL)	W 72–54	5–9 (1–4)	Hinkle Fieldhouse (4,285); Indianapolis, IN
Jan 17, 2004		Detroit	W 70–69 ^{OT}	6–9 (2–4)	Hinkle Fieldhouse (4,345); Indianapolis, IN
Jan 21, 2004		at Youngstown State	W 67–66 ^{OT}	7–9 (3–4)	Beeghly Center (3,172); Youngstown, OH
Jan 24, 2004		Wright State	L 53–54	7–10 (3–5)	Hinkle Fieldhouse (5,423); Indianapolis, IN
Jan 29, 2004		Cleveland State	W 61–43	8–10 (4–5)	Hinkle Fieldhouse (3,017); Indianapolis, IN
Jan 31, 2004		UIC	L 71–74 ^{OT}	8–11 (4–6)	Hinkle Fieldhouse (5,005); Indianapolis, IN
Feb 4, 2004*		IPFW	W 72–55	9–11	Hinkle Fieldhouse (3,014); Indianapolis, IN
Feb 7, 2004		at Loyola (IL)	W 74–67 ^{OT}	10–11 (5–6)	Joseph J. Gentile Center (3,507); Chicago, IL
Feb 12, 2003		at Cleveland State	W 57–56	11–11 (6–6)	Henry J. Goodman Arena (1,676); Cleveland, OH
Feb 14, 2004		at Detroit	L 48–54	11–12 (6–7)	Calihan Hall (5,145); Detroit, MI
Feb 18, 2004		Milwaukee	W 75–58	12–12 (7–7)	Hinkle Fieldhouse (3,645); Indianapolis, IN
Feb 21, 2004*		Ohio; BracketBuster	W 64–63 ^{OT}	13–12	Hinkle Fieldhouse (5,220); Indianapolis, IN
Feb 25, 2004		Youngstown State	W 81–76	14–12 (8–7)	Hinkle Fieldhouse (3,725); Indianapolis, IN
Feb 28, 2004		at UIC	L 54–64	14–13 (8–8)	UIC Pavilion (6,752); Chicago, IL
Horizon League tournament
Mar 2, 2004	(6)	(7) Youngstown State; First Round	W 88–57	15–13	Hinkle Fieldhouse (2,301); Indianapolis, IN
Mar 5, 2004	(6)	vs. (3) Green Bay; Quarterfinals	W 72–50	16–13	Hinkle Fieldhouse (3,579); Indianapolis, IN
Mar 6, 2004	(6)	vs. (2) UIC; Semifinals	L 56–65	16–14	Hinkle Fieldhouse (3,286); Indianapolis, IN
*Non-conference game. ^{#}Rankings from AP Poll. (#) Tournament seedings in parentheses. All times are in Eastern Time.
