= 2003–04 Wright State Raiders men's basketball team =

American college basketball season

2003–04 Wright State Raiders men's basketball
- Conference: Horizon League
- Record: 14–14 (10–6 Horizon League)
- Head coach: Paul Biancardi (1st season)
- Assistant coaches: Larry Greer; Ed Huckaby; Brian Donoher
- Home arena: Nutter Center

2003–04 Horizon League men's basketball standings
	Conf.				Overall
Team	W		L	PCT	W		L	PCT
Milwaukee	13	–	3	.813	20	–	11	.645
Illinois-Chicago †	12	–	4	.750	24	–	8	.750
Green Bay	11	–	5	.688	17	–	11	.607
Detroit Mercy	10	–	6	.625	19	–	11	.633
Wright State	10	–	6	.625	14	–	14	.500
Butler	8	–	8	.500	16	–	14	.533
Youngstown State	4	–	12	.250	8	–	20	.286
Loyola Chicago	4	–	12	.250	9	–	20	.310
Cleveland State	0	–	16	.000	4	–	25	.138
† 2004 Horizon League Tournament winner

The 2003–04 Wright State Raiders men's basketball team represented Wright State University in the 2003–04 NCAA Division I men's basketball season led by head coach Paul Biancardi.

== Season summary ==
=== Paul Biancardi ===
Jim O’Brien protégé Paul Biancardi brought credibility and stability to Wright State Raiders basketball. He was regarded nationally, having most recently been assistant coach and recruiting coordinator at Ohio State.

The experienced assistant coach arrived with relatively little fanfare and went straight to work by filling roster holes and preparing his team. He acknowledged the high goals that the school sets, but set the table by saying “. . . we’re not going to talk about that now. We have to take small steps before we can take big steps.” He cited the need to take his time hiring assistants, and promised to work hard at recruiting.

=== Regular season ===
The outlook for 2003-04 was bleak. The season began with the new coach wishing for a deeper bench and another month to prepare. The Raiders had two star senior leaders in Seth Doliboa and Vernard Hollins, but then it was freshmen and two senior role-players. It was unclear who would step forward and contribute. Two things worked in Biancardi’s favor. The two senior stars would both finish the season all-league, and freshman recruit DaShaun Wood turned out to be one of the most talented players in Wright State history.

Not unexpectedly, the season began poorly. The Raiders opened with a three game losing streak, including a loss to NAIA Cedarville. After six games they only had one win. But then signs of life were found and the Raiders went 3-3 in the next six games. Partway through this stretch redshirt freshman Drew Burleson join the team and provided a welcome spark. In the next six games Wright State went 6-0 and was back in the basketball business.

The freshmen class flourished with extended playing time that the unbalanced roster provided. "We’re seeing real growth," observed Biancardi about Alex Kock, Drew Burleson, DaShaun Wood and Zakee Boyd.

The regular season ended with disappointing losses to UIC and Green Bay, but 10-6 in the league was good enough for a fourth place finish. It was a successful season, far above any preseason expectations.

=== Tournament ===
Wright State’s lack of experience and thin roster finally caught up with them with an early exit to lowly Loyola in the Horizon League tournament.

=== Roster Changes ===
==== Joining ====
- DaShaun Wood recruited from Detroit Douglass High School.
- Alex Kock walked on out of DeKalb, Indiana
- Zakee Boyd as a highly regarded prep star from Newark, NJ.
- Vova Severosa from Vilnius, Lithuania recruited out of Birmingham Groves High School in Michigan
- Rick Poole walked on from Charmiade-Julienne High School
- Joe Bozeman walked on from Fairborn
- Zach Williams transferred from Ohio State and would have a redshirt transfer year

==== Leaving ====
- Lloyd Walls dropped out of school before the season.
- Trent Vaughn quit the team before the season.

== Roster ==
2003–04 Wright State Raiders men's basketball team
Players
Coaches

Pos.	#	Name	Height	Weight	Year	Previous school	Hometown
G	00	Vernard Hollins	6 ft 2 in (1.88 m)	210 lb (95 kg)	Sr	North Side	Ft. Wayne, IN
F	15	Seth Doliboa	6 ft 7 in (2.01 m)	225 lb (102 kg)	RS Sr	Springboro	Springboro, OH
F	3	Braden Bushman	6 ft 4 in (1.93 m)	192 lb (87 kg)	Sr	Mississinewa	Gas City, IN
F	21	Mark Starkey	6 ft 6 in (1.98 m)	210 lb (95 kg)	RS Sr	Boardman	Boardman, OH
G	1	DaShaun Wood	5 ft 11 in (1.8 m)	180 lb (82 kg)	Fr	Crocket	Detroit, MI
F	4	Drew Burleson	6 ft 6 in (1.98 m)	220 lb (100 kg)	RS Fr	Wheelersburg	Wheelersburg, OH
F	42	Alex Kock	6 ft 7 in (2.01 m)	210 lb (95 kg)	Fr	DeKalb	Auburn, IN
F	33	Zakee Boyd	6 ft 5 in (1.96 m)	190 lb (86 kg)	Fr	Lutheran Prep	Newark, NJ
F	12	Vova Severosa	6 ft 6 in (1.98 m)	225 lb (102 kg)	Fr	Birmingham Groves	Vilnius, Lithuania
G	2	Rick Poole	6 ft 1 in (1.85 m)	170 lb (77 kg)	Fr	Chraminade-Julienne	Dayton, OH
G	14	Joe Bozeman	6 ft 2 in (1.88 m)	185 lb (84 kg)	Fr	Fairborn	Fairborn, OH
F	22	Zach Williams (redshirt)	6 ft 7 in (2.01 m)	240 lb (109 kg)	RS Sr	North Side	Brooklyn, NY

Head coach

- Paul Biancardi

Assistant coach(es)

Larry Greer, Ed Huckaby, Brian Donoher

Legend

- (C) Team captain
- (S) Suspended
- (I) Ineligible
- (W) Walk-on
- Injured
- Current redshirt

== Schedule and results ==
Date time, TV	Rank^{#}	Opponent^{#}	Result	Record	Site city, state
Nov 25, 2003*		Cedarville	L 66-68	0-1	Nutter Center (4,143); Fairborn, OH
Nov 29, 2003*		at South Florida	L 59-74	0–2	USF Sun Dome (2,703); Tampa, FL
Dec 3, 2003*		at Morehead State	L 60–65	0–3	Ellis T. Johnson Arena (2,646); Morehead, Kentucky
Dec 6, 2003*		Ball State	W 64-50	1–3	Nutter Center (9,276); Fairborn, OH
Dec 11, 2003*		at Miami Ohio	L 61-76	1–4	Millett Assembly Hall (3,365); Oxford, Ohio
Dec 15, 2003*		Southern Illinois	L 73-79	1–5	Nutter Center (3,857); Fairborn, OH
Dec 18, 2003		at Youngstown State	W 69-59	2-5 (1-0)	Beeghly Center (2,367); Youngstown, OH
Dec 22, 2003*		at Toledo	L 66-103	2–6	Savage Arena (5,084); Toledo, OH
Dec 28, 2003*		at Brown	W 74-71	3–6	Pizzitola Sports Center (526); Providence, RI
Dec 30, 2003*		at Akron	L 67-85	3-7	JAR Arena (2,500); Akron, OH
Jan 3, 2004		Butler	W 51-39	4–7 (2–0)	Nutter Center (4,406); Fairborn, OH
Jan 5, 2004		Green Bay	L 46-53	4-8 (2–1)	Nutter Center (4,079); Fairborn, OH
Jan 8, 2004		at Cleveland State	W 78-73	5-8 (3–1)	CSU Convocation Center (1,463); Cleveland, OH
Jan 10, 2004		at Detroit Mercy	W 67–61	6-8 (4–1)	Calihan Hall (3,188); Detroit, MI
Jan 14, 2004*		Texas-Pan American	W 82-60	7–8	Nutter Center (4,336); Fairborn, OH
Jan 17, 2004		at Loyola	W 83-68	8-8 (5–1)	Gentile Event Center (2,917); Chicago, IL
Jan 21, 2004		UIC	W 83-68	9-8 (6–1)	Nutter Center (4,597); Fairborn, OH
Jan 24, 2004		at Butler	W 54-53	10-8 (7–1)	Hinkle Fieldhouse (5,423); Indianapolis
Jan 27, 2004		Milwaukee	L 53-68	10-9 (7-2)	Nutter Center (7,159); Fairborn, OH
Jan 31, 2004		Cleveland State	W 72-56	11-9 (8–2)	Nutter Center (8,403); Fairborn, OH
Feb 4, 2004		Loyola	W 83-71	12-9 (9–2)	Nutter Center (4,404); Fairborn, OH
Feb 7, 2004		at Milwaukee	L 66-72	12-10 (9–3)	UW–Milwaukee Panther Arena (4,118); Milwaukee, WI
Feb 11, 2004		Detroit Mercy	L 60–74	12-11 (9-4)	Nutter Center (4,172); Fairborn, OH
Feb 14, 2004*		Fort Wayne	W 66-64	13-11	Nutter Center (5,615); Fairborn, OH
Feb 19, 2004		Youngstown State	W 81-61	14-11 (10–4)	Nutter Center (7,085); Fairborn, OH
Feb 26, 2004		at UIC	L 71-75	14-12 (10–5)	UIC Pavilion (5,124); Chicago, IL
Feb 28, 2004		at Green Bay	L 65-76	14-13 (10–6)	Resch Center (5,624); Ashwaubenon, WI
Midwestern Collegiate Tournament
Mar 2, 2004	(5)	(8) Loyola; First Round	L 61-78	14-14	Nutter Center (2,692); Fairborn, OH
*Non-conference game. ^{#}Rankings from AP Poll. (#) Tournament seedings in parentheses. MW=Midwest.

== Awards and honors ==
Vernard Hollins	MVP
Tyson Freeman	Raider Award
Seth Doliboa	First Team All Horizon League
Vernard Hollins	Second Team All Horizon League
DaShaun Wood	All Newcomer Team
Paul Biancardi	Horizon League Coach of the Year

== Statistics ==
Number	Name	Games	Average	Points	Assists	Rebounds
00	Vernard Hollins	28	16.3	456	130	166
15	Seth Doliboa	28	15.0	420	29	207
00	DaShaun Wood	28	8.7	243	88	116
4	Drew Burleson	28	7.6	213	8	117
40	Alex Kock	28	7.3	203	42	90
33	Zakee Boyd	28	5.9	164	14	49
12	Vova Severosa	28	4.8	133	5	102
3	Braden Bushman	11	0.9	10	3	5
21	Mark Starkey	12	0.8	10	0	5
2	Rick Poole	12	0.4	5	2	5
14	Joe Bozeman	0	0.0	0	0	0
