= Paul Biancardi =

American basketball recruiting director (born 1962)

Personal information
- Born: August 11, 1962 (age 64)

Career information
- High school: Pope John XXIII (Everett, Massachusetts)
- College: Salem State (1981–1985)
- NBA draft: 1985: undrafted
- Position: Guard
- Coaching career: 1985–2008

Career history

Coaching
- 1985–1986: Salem State (assistant)
- 1986–1987: Stoneham HS (assistant)
- 1987–1989: Suffolk (assistant)
- 1989–1990: Boston University (assistant)
- 1990–1997: Boston College (assistant)
- 1997–2003: Ohio State (assistant)
- 2003–2006: Wright State
- 2007–2008: Saint Louis (assistant)

Career highlights
- Horizon League Coach of the Year (2004)

Paul Biancardi (born August 11, 1962) is an American recruiting director, basketball analyst and former college basketball coach.

== Playing career ==
Biancardi attended Pope John XXIII High School and was inducted into the school Athletics Hall of Fame in 1997. He played under Tom Thibodeau at Salem State. Biancardi was voted team captain as a senior and received the "James Twohig Award" for outstanding character, sportsmanship and dedication. In 1985, he graduated with a degree in physical education.

== Coaching career ==
Biancardi began his coaching career at St. Lazarus eighth-grade CYO team while at Salem State. After graduating, he took a job as an assistant at Salem State. Biancardi then became an assistant at Stoneham High School. He returned to the collegiate ranks as an assistant under Jim Nelson at Suffolk. Biancardi took a teaching job in Boston while serving as a volunteer assistant at Boston University under Mike Jarvis in the 1989–90 season. At Boston University, Biancardi helped the Terriers win the North Atlantic Conference title and reach the NCAA Tournament.

In 1990, he got his first full-time job as an assistant on Jim O'Brien's staff at Boston College. Biancardi wanted to prove to O'Brien that he could do any task assigned to him, and he called the assistant position, with its pay raise, "a dream come true." Biancardi helped Boston College reach the Elite Eight in 1994 and win the Big East Championship in 1997. In 1997, he followed O'Brien to Ohio State. Biancardi helped the Buckeyes reach the Final Four in 1999, one of four NCAA appearances while at the school. He served as lead recruiter, with his 2002 class ranked 10th by Hoop Scoop Magazine. He was named the top assistant coach in 2002 by Hoop Scoop Online.

In April 2003, Biancardi was hired as the head coach at Wright State, replacing Ed Schilling. In his first season, Biancardi led the Raiders to a 14–14 record. He was named the 2004 Horizon League Coach of the Year. In the 2005–06 season, he helped the team finish 13–15. Biancardi was fired by Wright State in March 2006 after the NCAA found that he sent $6000 from O'Brien to a recruit in 1999. Biancardi was further barred from recruiting until October 1, 2007, and with the stipulation that if violated this, Wright State would face sanctions.

In 2007, Biancardi accepted a job as an assistant at Saint Louis. Biancardi served as the chief recruiter under Rick Majerus. Biancardi left Saint Louis in July 2008.

== Broadcasting career ==
Biancardi joined ESPN as an analyst in 2006. In 2008, he became ESPN's national recruiting director. Biancardi is a voting member of the McDonald's All American committee as well as for Gatorade state and national player of the year awards. He serves as the lead analyst for GEICO ESPN High School Showcase as well as some college basketball games. Alongside Mike Couzens, he covered the 2016 DICK's Sporting Goods High School Nationals, when Oak Hill Academy won against La Lumiere School with a buzzer-beating shot. In 2017, Biancardi signed a new contract with ESPN.

== Personal life ==
Biancardi is married to Theresa and they have two daughters, Katerina Elise and Alyssa Marie.

== Head coaching record ==
Record table
Season	Team	Overall	Conference	Standing	Postseason
Wright State Raiders (Horizon League) (2006–2010)
2003–04	Wright State	14–14	10–6		
2004–05	Wright State	15–15	8–8		
2005–06	Wright State	13–15	8–8		
Wright State:		42–44 (.488)	26–22 (.542)		
Total:		42–44			
National champion Postseason invitational champion Conference regular season champion Conference regular season and conference tournament champion Division regular season champion Division regular season and conference tournament champion Conference tournament champion
