= Greg McDermott =

American basketball coach (born 1964)

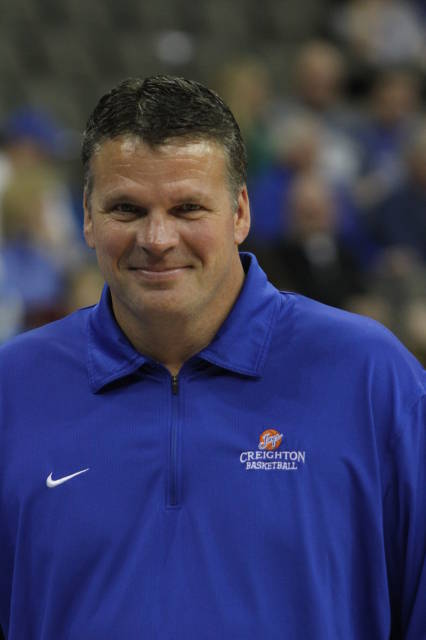
- McDermott at the MVC tournament in 2012

Biographical details
- Born: November 25, 1964 (age 61); Cascade, Iowa, U.S.

Playing career
- 1984–1988: Northern Iowa

Coaching career (HC unless noted)
- 1989–1994: North Dakota (assistant)
- 1994–2000: Wayne State (NE)
- 2000–2001: North Dakota State
- 2001–2006: Northern Iowa
- 2006–2010: Iowa State
- 2010–2026: Creighton

Head coaching record
- Overall: 646–384 (.627)
- Tournaments: 12–13 (NCAA Division I); 4–2 (NIT); 4–2 (CBI); 1–1 (CBC)

Accomplishments and honors

Championships
- NSIC regular season (2000); MVC regular season (2013); 3 MVC tournament (2004, 2012, 2013); Big East regular season (2020)

Awards
- Big East Coach of the Year (2020); NSIC Coach of the Year (2000)

Greg McDermott (born November 25, 1964) is an American basketball coach who served as the head coach of the Creighton Bluejays men's basketball team from 2010 to 2026. McDermott also served as the head coach at Wayne State College, North Dakota State, Northern Iowa, and Iowa State. He is the winningest coach in Creighton basketball history with a 366–189 record.

== Early life ==
McDermott grew up in Cascade, Iowa, in an Irish Catholic household and played basketball for Cascade High School. A 6'8" center, he then played college basketball for the Northern Iowa Panthers from 1984 to 1988. In 1988, he earned a B.A. degree from Northern Iowa.

== Coaching career ==
=== Early coaching career ===
McDermott began his coaching career as an assistant coach at North Dakota between 1989 and 1994, and during his tenure helped lead the Fighting Sioux to five consecutive NCAA Division II tournaments. On March 29, 1994, he accepted his first head coaching position at Division II Wayne State College. McDermott remained as the head coach at Wayne State College for six seasons and compiled an overall record of 116 wins and 53 losses (116–53) during his tenure there from 1994 to 2000.

=== North Dakota State ===
In April 2000, McDermott resigned his Wayne State post and accepted the head coaching position at North Dakota State. In his lone season with NDSU, he led the Bison to an overall record of 15 wins and 11 losses (15–11) en route to an eighth place finish in the North Central Conference.

=== Northern Iowa ===
On April 3, 2001, McDermott was introduced as head coach at his alma mater, Northern Iowa.

McDermott remained as the Panthers' head coach for five seasons between 2001 and 2006. During his tenure he led Northern Iowa to an overall record of 90 wins and 63 losses (90–63), the 2004 Missouri Valley Conference tournament championship and the 2004, 2005, and 2006 NCAA Tournaments.

=== Iowa State ===
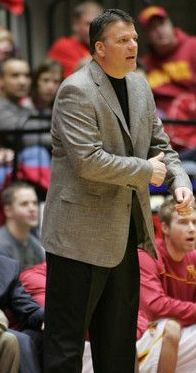
McDermott coaching Iowa State

McDermott resigned his position with Northern Iowa on March 21, 2006, and accepted the same one at Iowa State. McDermott was the Cyclones' head coach for four seasons between 2007 and 2010, and during his tenure led them to an overall record of 59 wins and 68 losses (59–68). His marquee victory at Iowa State came on March 6, 2010, against No. 5 Kansas State. This was his only victory over a ranked team while with the Cyclones.

=== Creighton ===
On April 26, 2010, he resigned from Iowa State and accepted the same position at Creighton. The contract with Creighton was a reported ten-year deal, worth well over one million dollars per season.

==== 2010–11 season ====
In his first season with the Bluejays, McDermott led the team to a 23–16 record, 10–8 in the Missouri Valley Conference. Creighton reached the final round of the College Basketball Invitational tournament where they lost to Oregon two games to one.

==== 2011–12 season ====
In just his second year, McDermott led Creighton to the Missouri Valley Conference tournament championship. The Bluejays were ranked as high as No. 12 in the nation, finished sixth nationally in home attendance, and received an automatic bid to the NCAA Tournament as the No. 8 seed in the Midwest Region. Creighton would defeat Alabama 58–57 in the first round, and lose to UNC 87–73 in the second round.

==== 2012–13 season ====
Entering the 2012–13 season, McDermott had Creighton in the rankings in both preseason polls; they were No. 15 in the USA Today Coaches Poll and No. 16 in the AP Poll. McDermott would lead Creighton to the MVC regular season championship, and its second straight MVC conference tournament championship. The Bluejays were ranked as high as No. 10 in the nation and finished sixth nationally in home attendance for the second consecutive year. The Bluejays received an automatic bid to the NCAA Tournament, where they were the No. 7 seed in the Midwest Region. Creighton would defeat Cincinnati 67–63 in the first round, and lose to Duke 66–50 in the second round.

==== 2013–14 season ====
After the end of the 2012–13 season, Creighton left the Missouri Valley to join the Big East. In his fourth year at Creighton and first in the Big East, McDermott would lead Creighton to a runner-up finish in the Big East regular season and tournament. The Bluejays were ranked as high as No. 9 in the nation, and finished sixth nationally in home attendance for the third consecutive year. The Bluejays lost to Providence 65–58 in the finals of the Big East tournament, and received an at-large bid to the NCAA Tournament as the No. 3 seed in the West Region, the highest NCAA Tournament seed in Creighton history. Creighton would defeat UL Lafayette 76–66 in the first round, and lose to Baylor 85–55 in the second round.

==== 2014–15 season ====
Despite being ranked as high as No. 23 during the season, McDermott would have his first losing season at Creighton as they finished in a tie for last place in the Big East with a record of 14–19, 4–14 in conference play.

==== 2015–16 season ====
In his sixth season with Creighton, McDermott led the Bluejays to a sixth place finish in the Big East with a record of 18–13, 9–9 in conference play. In the quarterfinals of the NIT, they lost to BYU 88–82 to finish the season 20–15.

==== 2016–17 season ====
Entering the 2016–17 season, Creighton was ranked in both preseason polls. McDermott led the Bluejays to an 18–1 start and a ranking as high as No. 7 in the nation. During Creighton's 18th win, starting point guard Mo Watson Jr. suffered a season-ending knee injury. The team finished the regular season 23–8, and lost to Villanova in the Big East tournament finals. The Bluejays received an at-large bid to the NCAA tournament as the No. 6 seed in the Midwest Region, and lost to the Rhode Island Rams 84–72 in the first round to finish the season 25–10.

==== 2017–18 season ====
McDermott led the 2017–2018 Bluejays to a 21–12 record, 10–8 in Big East play to finish in a three-way tie for third place. They lost in the quarterfinals of the Big East tournament to Providence 72–68. They received an at-large bid to the NCAA tournament as the No. 8 seed in the South Region. There, the Bluejays lost in the first round to Kansas State 69–59.

==== 2018–19 season ====
The Bluejays finished the season 20–15, 9–9 in Big East play to finish in a four-way tie for third place. As the No. 5 seed in the Big East tournament, they lost to Xavier in the quarterfinals. They received a bid to the National Invitation Tournament as the No. 2 seed in the NIT bracket where they defeated Loyola and Memphis before losing to TCU 71–58 in the quarterfinals.

==== 2019–20 season ====
Entering the 2019–20 season, the Bluejays were picked to finish 7th in the Big East, however McDermott and his team were able to finish tied for the Big East regular season championship with Villanova and Seton Hall. The Bluejays received the number 1 seed in the Big East tournament, and finished with a 24–7 record, 13–5 in the Big East. The Jays finished with a ranking of 7th in the nation which was their highest ranking of the season. Due to the COVID-19 outbreak, both the Big East tournament and the NCAA Tournament were cancelled. McDermott would record his 500th win as a head coach in this season with a 77–65 win over Xavier.

==== 2020–21 season ====
Creighton finished the 2020–21 regular season with an 18–7 record, 14–6 in conference play, to finish in second place in the Big East. Creighton received an at-large bid to the NCAA tournament as the No. 5 seed in the West Region. In the first round, the Bluejays defeated the UCSB Gauchos 63–62. In the second round, the Bluejays defeated the Ohio Bobcats 72–58, to reach the program's first regional semifinal since 1974. Creighton was defeated by Gonzaga 83–65, to finish the season with a record of 22–9.

==== 2021–22 season ====
During the 2021–22 regular season, largely regarded as a rebuilding year after the departure of star point guard Marcus Zegarowski and three other starters from the 2020–2021 roster, as well as two assistant coaches, McDermott nevertheless guided the Bluejays to a 20–10 regular season record (12–7 in Big East play), good enough for 4th place. Creighton received an at-large bid to the NCAA tournament as the No. 9 seed in the Midwest Region. In the first round, the Bluejays defeated the San Diego State Aztecs 72–69 in overtime. In the second round, the Bluejays lost to the Kansas Jayhawks 79–72, to finish the season with a record of 23–12. On March 22, 2022, McDermott received a multi-year contract extension. The terms of the deal were not disclosed.

==== 2023–24 season ====
On March 8, 2024, McDermott received another contract extension to keep him at Creighton through the 2027-2028 season; his previous contract was due to expire after the end of the 2025-2026 season. The new contract also makes McDermott one of the highest-paid coaches in the Big East.

==== 2024–25 season ====
On November 13, 2024, McDermott passed Dana Altman for the most coaching wins in program history (328) when the Bluejays defeated the Houston Christian Huskies 78–43.

After the 2024–25 season, Alan Huss was named the associate head coach at Creighton, where he had previously served as an assistant head coach from 2017 to 2023. Huss' contract stipulates that he will become the next head coach at Creighton when Greg McDermott retires.

==== 2025–26 season ====
On March 23, 2026, McDermott announced he would retire after the team's final game in the 2026 College Basketball Crown tournament.

== Personal life ==
Greg is the father of former NBA player Doug McDermott.

== Head coaching record ==
Record table
| Season | Team | Overall | Conference | Standing | Postseason |
|---|---|---|---|---|---|
Wayne State Wildcats (NCAA Division II independent) (1994–1998)
| 1994–95 | Wayne State | 14–13 | | | |
| 1995–96 | Wayne State | 12–15 | | | |
| 1996–97 | Wayne State | 21–7 | | | |
| 1997–98 | Wayne State | 20–7 | | | |
| 1998–99 | Wayne State | 23–5 | | | NCAA Division II Round of 32 |
Wayne State Wildcats (Northern Sun Intercollegiate Conference) (1999–2000)
| 1999–00 | Wayne State | 26–6 | 15–3 | T–1st | NCAA Division II Sweet 16 |
| Wayne State: | | 116–53 (.686) | 15–3 (.833) | | |
North Dakota State Bison (North Central Conference) (2000–2001)
| 2000–01 | North Dakota State | 15–11 | 7–11 | 8th | |
| North Dakota State: | | 15–11 (.577) | 7–11 (.389) | | |
Northern Iowa Panthers (Missouri Valley Conference) (2001–2006)
| 2001–02 | Northern Iowa | 14–15 | 8–10 | 7th | |
| 2002–03 | Northern Iowa | 11–17 | 7–11 | 7th | |
| 2003–04 | Northern Iowa | 21–10 | 12–6 | T–2nd | NCAA Division I Round of 64 |
| 2004–05 | Northern Iowa | 21–11 | 11–7 | T–3rd | NCAA Division I Round of 64 |
| 2005–06 | Northern Iowa | 23–10 | 11–7 | T–5th | NCAA Division I Round of 64 |
| Northern Iowa: | | 90–63 (.588) | 49–41 (.544) | | |
Iowa State Cyclones (Big 12 Conference) (2006–2010)
| 2006–07 | Iowa State | 15–16 | 6–10 | T–7th | |
| 2007–08 | Iowa State | 14–18 | 4–12 | 11th | |
| 2008–09 | Iowa State | 15–17 | 4–12 | 10th | |
| 2009–10 | Iowa State | 15–17 | 4–12 | 11th | |
| Iowa State: | | 59–68 (.465) | 18–46 (.281) | | |
Creighton Bluejays (Missouri Valley Conference) (2010–2013)
| 2010–11 | Creighton | 23–16 | 10–8 | 4th | CBI Runner-Up |
| 2011–12 | Creighton | 29–6 | 14–4 | 2nd | NCAA Division I Round of 32 |
| 2012–13 | Creighton | 28–8 | 13–5 | 1st | NCAA Division I Round of 32 |
Creighton Bluejays (Big East Conference) (2013–2026)
| 2013–14 | Creighton | 27–8 | 14–4 | 2nd | NCAA Division I Round of 32 |
| 2014–15 | Creighton | 14–19 | 4–14 | T–9th | |
| 2015–16 | Creighton | 20–15 | 9–9 | 6th | NIT Quarterfinal |
| 2016–17 | Creighton | 25–10 | 10–8 | T–3rd | NCAA Division I Round of 64 |
| 2017–18 | Creighton | 21–12 | 10–8 | T–3rd | NCAA Division I Round of 64 |
| 2018–19 | Creighton | 20–15 | 9–9 | T–3rd | NIT Quarterfinal |
| 2019–20 | Creighton | 24–7 | 13–5 | T–1st | Postseason cancelled due to COVID-19 |
| 2020–21 | Creighton | 22–9 | 14–6 | 2nd | NCAA Division I Sweet 16 |
| 2021–22 | Creighton | 23–12 | 12–7 | 4th | NCAA Division I Round of 32 |
| 2022–23 | Creighton | 24–13 | 14–6 | 3rd | NCAA Division I Elite Eight |
| 2023–24 | Creighton | 25–10 | 14–6 | T–2nd | NCAA Division I Sweet 16 |
| 2024–25 | Creighton | 25–11 | 15–5 | 2nd | NCAA Division I Round of 32 |
| 2025–26 | Creighton | 16–18 | 9–11 | 5th | CBC Semifinal |
| Creighton: | | 366–189 (.659) | 182–115 (.613) | | |
| Total: | | 646–384 (.627) | | | |
National champion Postseason invitational champion Conference regular season champion Conference regular season and conference tournament champion Division regular season champion Division regular season and conference tournament champion Conference tournament champion

== Coaching tree ==
Assistant coaches under McDermott who became NCAA head coaches

- Darian DeVries – Drake (2018–2024), West Virginia (2024–2025), Indiana (2025–present)
- Eric Henderson – South Dakota State (2019–2025), Drake (2025–present)
- Alan Huss – High Point (2023–2025), Creighton (2026–present)
- Ben Jacobson – Northern Iowa (2006–2026), Utah State (2026–present)
- Steve Lutz – Texas A&M–Corpus Christi (2021–2023), Western Kentucky (2023–2024), Oklahoma State (2024–present)
- Ryan Miller – Murray State (2025–present)
- T. J. Otzelberger – South Dakota State (2016–2019), UNLV (2019–2021), Iowa State (2021–present)
- Bryan Petersen – South Dakota State (2025–present)
- David Richman – North Dakota State (2014–present)
- Daniyal Robinson – Cleveland State (2022–2025), North Texas (2025–present)
- Paul Sather – Northern State (2010–2019), North Dakota (2019–present)
- Patrick Sellers – Central Connecticut (2021–present)
