= Brooks McKowen =

American basketball player and coach

Current position
- Title: Head Coach
- Team: Missouri Western
- Conference: MIAA
- Record: 17–10

Playing career
- 2003–2007: Northern Iowa

Coaching career (HC unless noted)
- 2007–2009: Northern Iowa (GA)
- 2009–2010: Northern Iowa (assistant)
- 2010–2011: Des Moines Area CC (assistant)
- 2011–2013: SMSU (assistant)
- 2013–2025: Upper Iowa
- 2025–present: Missouri Western

Head coaching record
- Overall: 226–148

Accomplishments and honors

Awards
- Iowa Mr. Basketball (2003); IHSAA Hall of Fame

Brooks McKowen is an American college basketball coach, currently the head coach of the Griffons at Missouri Western State University

He had a successful career at Wapsie Valley High School in his hometown of Fairbank, Iowa, finishing as the state's all-time scoring leader and winning Iowa Mr. Basketball honors in 2003. McKowen then played basketball at Northern Iowa under Greg McDermott and Ben Jacobson. After his playing days were over, he stayed at Northern Iowa as a graduate assistant, then as a video coordinator. In 2010, he left and spent one season as an assistant coach at Des Moines Area Community College. Afterwards, he spent two seasons as an assistant coach at Southwest Minnesota State University under head coach Brad Bigler. While there, the Mustangs won their first ever Northern Sun men's basketball tournament championship in 2012.

In 2013, McKowen was hired as the head coach of the Upper Iowa Peacocks. He spent 12 seasons with the Peacocks, compiling an overall record of 209–138 (149–101 conference).

On March 25, 2025, it was announced that McKowen would be named the next head coach of the Missouri Western Griffons who play in the Mid-America Intercollegiate Athletics Association.

He was inducted into the IHSAA Basketball Hall of Fame as a member of its 2017 class.

== Head coaching record ==
Record table
Season	Team	Overall	Conference	Standing	Postseason
Upper Iowa (NSIC) (2013–2023)
2013–14	Upper Iowa	16–14	13–9	T-7th	
2014–15	Upper Iowa	17–13	12–10	T-7th	
2015–16	Upper Iowa	16–17	11–11	T-7th	
2016–17	Upper Iowa	22–11	16–6	T-4th	NCAA DII First Round
2017–18	Upper Iowa	17–15	10–12	T-8th	
2018–19	Upper Iowa	7–22	4–18	T-15th	
2019–20	Upper Iowa	19–11	15–7	T-3rd	
2020–21	Upper Iowa	10–7	8–4	4th	
2021–22	Upper Iowa	26–6	18–4	2nd	NCAA Division II Regional semifinals
2022–23	Upper Iowa	16–13	13–9	T-4th	
Upper Iowa (GLVC) (2023–2025)
2023–24	Upper Iowa	22–10	15–5	2nd	NCAA Division II Regional semifinals
2024–25	Upper Iowa	21–9	14–6	3rd	
Upper Iowa:		209–138 (.602)	149–101 (.596)		
Missouri Western (MIAA) (2025–present)
2025–26	Missouri Western	17–10	9–7		
Missouri Western:		17–10 (.630)	9–7 (.563)		
Total:		226–148 (.604)			
National champion Postseason invitational champion Conference regular season champion Conference regular season and conference tournament champion Division regular season champion Division regular season and conference tournament champion Conference tournament champion
