= 2003–04 Florida A&M Rattlers basketball team =

American college basketball season

2003–04 Florida A&M Rattlers basketball

MEAC tournament champions

NCAA tournament
- Conference: Mid-Eastern Athletic Conference
- Record: 15–17 (10–8 MEAC)
- Head coach: Mike Gillespie
- Assistant coach: Robert Washington (3rd season)
- Home arena: Jake Gaither Gymnasium

2003–04 MEAC men's basketball standings
	Conf.				Overall
Team	W		L	PCT	W		L	PCT
South Carolina State	14	–	4	.778	18	–	11	.621
Coppin State	14	–	4	.778	18	–	14	.563
Delaware State	11	–	7	.611	13	–	15	.464
Hampton	11	–	7	.611	13	–	17	.433
Florida A&M †	10	–	8	.556	15	–	17	.469
Norfolk State	10	–	8	.556	12	–	17	.414
Morgan State	9	–	9	.500	11	–	16	.407
Bethune–Cookman	7	–	11	.389	8	–	21	.276
Maryland Eastern Shore	6	–	12	.333	8	–	21	.276
Howard	4	–	14	.222	6	–	22	.214
North Carolina A&T	3	–	15	.167	3	–	25	.107
† 2004 MEAC tournament winner Rankings from AP Poll

The 2003–04 Florida A&M Rattlers men's basketball team represented Florida A&M University during the 2003–04 NCAA Division I men's basketball season. The Rattlers, led by head coach Mike Gillespie, played their home games at the Teaching Gym as members of the Mid-Eastern Athletic Conference. They finished the season 15–17, 10–8 in MEAC play to finish in fifth place in the conference regular season standings. They broke through to capture the MEAC tournament and secure the conference's automatic bid to the NCAA Tournament. Playing as one of two No. 16 seeds in the Midwest region, The Rattlers defeated fellow No. 16 seed Lehigh in the play-in game before losing to No. 1 seed Kentucky, 96–76.

== Roster ==
2003–04 Florida A&M Rattlers men's basketball team
Players	Coaches
Pos. / # / Name / Height / Weight / Year / Hometown; G / 12 / Brandin Jay / 6 ft 3 in (1.91 m) / 185 lb (84 kg) / Sr / Memphis, Tennessee	Head coach: Mike Gillespie (DePaul); Assistant coach(es): Robert Washington (Eastern Kentucky); Legend: (C) Team captain; (S) Suspended; (I) Ineligible; (W) Walk-on; Injured; Current redshirt; Roster

== Schedule and results ==
Date time, TV	Rank^{#}	Opponent^{#}	Result	Record	Site (attendance) city, state
Non-conference regular season
Nov 23, 2003*		at Illinois State	L 70–87	0–1	Redbird Arena; Normal, Illinois
Nov 25, 2003*		Cleveland State	L 88–97	0–2	Gaither Athletic Center; Tallahassee, Florida
Nov 28, 2003*		at No. 25 NC State	L 62–92	0–3	RBC Center; Raleigh, North Carolina
Dec 2, 2003*		at No. 2 Florida	L 78–102	0–4	Stephen C. O'Connell Center; Gainesville, Florida
Dec 5, 2003*		at Georgia	L 59–77	0–5	Stegeman Coliseum; Athens, Georgia
Dec 14, 2003*		at Alabama State	L 69–75	0–6	Joe L. Reed Acadome; Montgomery, Alabama
Dec 22, 2003*		at Marquette	L 63–83	1–8	Bradley Center; Milwaukee, Wisconsin
MEAC regular season
MEAC tournament
Mar 11, 2004*		vs. Hampton; Quarterfinals	W 72–71	12–16	Arthur Ashe Athletic Center; Norfolk, Virginia
Mar 12, 2004*		vs. South Carolina State; Semifinals	W 65–53	13–16	Arthur Ashe Athletic Center; Norfolk, Virginia
Mar 13, 2004*		vs. Coppin State; Championship game	W 58–51	14–16	Arthur Ashe Athletic Center; Norfolk, Virginia
NCAA tournament
Mar 16, 2004*	(16 MW)	vs. (16 MW) Lehigh; Play-in game	W 72–57	15–16	UD Arena; Dayton, Ohio
Mar 19, 2004*	(16 MW)	vs. (1 MW) No. 2 Kentucky; First round	L 76–96	15–17	Nationwide Arena; Columbus, Ohio
*Non-conference game. ^{#}Rankings from AP Poll. (#) Tournament seedings in parentheses. MW=Midwest. All times are in Eastern Time.
