= 2003–04 Ivy League men's basketball season =

The 2003–04 Ivy League men's basketball season was the Ivy League's 50th season of basketball. The team with the best record (Princeton Tigers) played in the 2004 NCAA Men's Division I Basketball Tournament. Jason Forte, a junior point guard from the Brown Bears, was awarded the Ivy League Men's Basketball Player of the Year.

== Standings ==
School	Coach	W	L
Princeton	John Thompson III	13	1
Penn	Fran Dunphy	10	4
Brown	Glen Miller	10	4
Yale	James Jones	7	7
Cornell	Steve Donahue	6	8
Columbia	Joe Jones	6	8
Harvard	Frank Sullivan	3	11
Dartmouth	Dave Faucher	1	13
