= Jessie Evans (basketball) =

American basketball player and coach

Biographical details
- Born: October 24, 1950 (age 76); Lebanon, Tennessee, U.S.

Playing career
- 1968–1972: Eastern Michigan

Coaching career (HC unless noted)
- 1972–1973: Flint Pros
- 1973–1976: Flint Northwestern HS (MI)
- 1976–1981: Minnesota (asst.)
- 1982–1984: San Diego State (asst.)
- 1984–1986: Wyoming (asst.)
- 1986–1988: Texas (asst.)
- 1988–1997: Arizona (asst.)
- 1997–2004: Louisiana–Lafayette
- 2004–2007: San Francisco
- 2012–2014: Southeast Missouri State (asst.)

Head coaching record
- Overall: 177–138 (.562) (college)
- Tournaments: 0–2 (NCAA Division I); 1–3 (NIT)

Accomplishments and honors

Championships
- 2 Sun Belt tournament (2000, 2004); 2 Sun Belt regular season (2000, 2004)

Jessie Evans (born October 24, 1950) is the former head men's basketball coach at the University of San Francisco. He was replaced by Eddie Sutton on December 26, 2007. He previously held the same position at the University of Louisiana at Lafayette.

He was Lute Olson’s chief recruiter at Arizona. He recruited almost 20 future NBA players in his 10 years at Arizona, including most of the 1997 National Championship Team. Following winning the National Title at Arizona, Evans accepted the head coaching job at Louisiana Lafayette. He left ULL for the University of San Francisco head coaching job after the 2003-2004 season. In 2012, Evans was hired as an assistant men's basketball coach at Southeast Missouri State University, where he served for two seasons. Evans was a finalist for the Tennessee State head coaching job in Nashville.

== Head coaching record ==
Record table
Season	Team	Overall	Conference	Standing	Postseason
Southwestern Louisiana / Louisiana–Lafayette Ragin' Cajuns (Sun Belt Conference) (1997–2004)
1997–98	Southwestern Louisiana	18–13	12–6	3rd	
1998–99	Southwestern Louisiana	13–16	7–7	T–3rd	
1999–00	Louisiana–Lafayette	25–9	13–3	T–1st	NCAA Division I First Round
2000–01	Louisiana–Lafayette	16–13	10–6	T–2nd (West)	
2001–02	Louisiana–Lafayette	20–11	11–4	T–1st (West)	NIT Opening Round
2002–03	Louisiana–Lafayette	20–10	12–3	1st (West)	NIT First Round
2003–04	Louisiana–Lafayette	20–9	12–3	1st (West)	NCAA Division I First Round
Southwestern Louisiana / Louisiana–Lafayette:		132–81 (.620)	77–32 (.706)		
San Francisco Dons (West Coast Conference) (2004–2007)
2004–05	San Francisco	17–14	6–8	T–5th	NIT First Round
2005–06	San Francisco	11–17	7–7	4th	
2006–07	San Francisco	13–18	8–6	T–3rd	
2007–08	San Francisco	4–8			
San Francisco:		45–57 (.441)	21–21 (.500)		
Total:		177–138 (.562)			
National champion Postseason invitational champion Conference regular season champion Conference regular season and conference tournament champion Division regular season champion Division regular season and conference tournament champion Conference tournament champion
