= JT3 =

JT3 may refer to:

- John Thompson III, former head coach of the men's basketball team at Georgetown University
- Pratt & Whitney JT3C, a turbojet engine
- Pratt & Whitney JT3D, a turbofan engine
