= Rick Stansbury =

American basketball coach (born 1959)

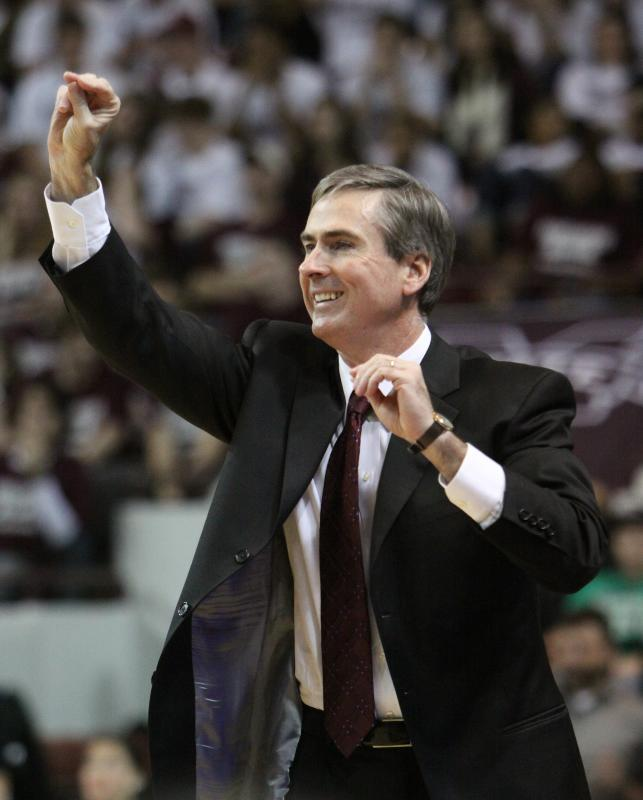
- Stansbury in 2012

Current position
- Title: Associate head coach
- Team: LSU
- Conference: SEC

Biographical details
- Born: December 23, 1959 (age 66); Battletown, Kentucky, U.S.

Playing career
- 1977–1981: Campbellsville

Coaching career (HC unless noted)
- 1981–1982: Campbellsville (assistant)
- 1983–1984: Cumberland (KY) (assistant)
- 1984–1990: Austin Peay (assistant)
- 1990–1998: Mississippi State (assistant)
- 1998–2012: Mississippi State
- 2014–2016: Texas A&M (associate HC)
- 2016–2023: Western Kentucky
- 2023–2025: Memphis (assistant)
- 2026–present: LSU (associate HC)

Head coaching record
- Overall: 441–255 (.634)
- Tournaments: 4–6 (NCAA Division I); 10–7 (NIT)

Accomplishments and honors

Championships
- 2 SEC tournament (2002, 2009); SEC regular season (2004); 5 SEC West Division (2003), (2004), (2007), (2008), (2010); C-USA West Division (2021); C-USA regular season (2021)

Awards
- SEC Coach of the Year (2004)

Richard Lee Stansbury (born December 23, 1959), is an American college basketball coach, currently the associate head coach for LSU. Stansbury was the head basketball coach for Mississippi State from 1998 to 2012. He also was the head coach for Western Kentucky from 2016 to 2023. Stansbury is the all-time wins leader for Mississippi State and reached 9th all-time in SEC wins.

== Early life ==
Stansbury was born in Battletown, Kentucky, and played high school basketball for Meade County High School in Brandenburg, Kentucky from which he graduated in 1977. From 1977 to 1981, he played college basketball at Campbellsville College (now Campbellsville University) in Campbellsville, Kentucky. He led the team to the NAIA Tournament in his senior season. He is currently a member of the Campbellsville University Athletics Hall of Fame.

== Coaching career ==
=== Early coaching career ===
Stansbury began his coaching career at his alma mater as a student assistant (1982–83). Following his stint at Campbellsville, he served as a graduate assistant at Cumberland College (now University of the Cumberlands) in Williamsburg, Kentucky (1983–84). There, he helped to lead the team to a 31–5 mark and a second round appearance in the NAIA Tournament.

In 1984, Stansbury moved to Austin Peay State University in Clarksville, Tennessee, where he served a six-year term as an assistant, helping guide that team to three consecutive winning seasons, beginning with a conference tournament championship and a subsequent NCAA tournament second round berth during the 1986–87 season, while the Governors posted a mark of 20–12.

=== Mississippi State ===
After leaving Austin Peay, Stansbury served as an assistant coach at Mississippi State under Richard Williams from 1990 to 1994. He became Williams' associate head coach and top recruiter in 1994 and remained in that position until 1998. During those eight seasons, the Bulldogs won the Southeastern Conference (SEC) regular season championship (1991), twice won the SEC West crown (1995 and 1996), won the SEC tournament championship (1996); advanced to the Sweet 16 in back to back years (1995 and 1996) and reached the Final Four in 1996.

Taking over the helm as the Bulldogs head coach in 1998, Stansbury led his team to postseason tournament play 11 times in 14 seasons (six NCAA and five NIT tournaments), with five consecutive post-season tournament appearances, the first MSU basketball coach in history to accomplish this feat. His 2001–02 MSU team compiled the most wins in a single season in school history (27). Also achieved the highest national ranking in school history in 2003–04, No. 2 in the country (finished 26–4). Stansbury also owns MSU's record for consecutive 20-win seasons with four from 2001 to 2005 and again from 2006 to 2010.

Stansbury's philosophy is centered around limiting assisted baskets and forcing opponents to take difficult shots. His teams consistently rank among the best in opposing assist rates, with Stansbury ranked 8th in college basketball history with a rate of 48.7%. While some teams allow high volumes of 3-point attempts or assists, Stansbury's defenses excel in disrupting offensive flow, creating tough, low-percentage shots. This emphasis on defensive discipline contributes significantly to his teams' overall success.

From his days as an MSU assistant until 2012, Stansbury was part of over 15 postseason tournament appearances. Prior to his arrival at Mississippi State, MSU had two post-seasons in 27 years (both NIT). He was also 21–8 vs conference in-state rival, the Mississippi Rebels.

During the 2007–08 season, Stansbury passed Williams as the all-time most successful basketball coach at Mississippi State, with 192 wins. Stansbury retired with 293 wins, ranking 9th in the history of the SEC. Stansbury announced his retirement on March 15, 2012; he cited a desire to spend more time with his family.

=== Texas A&M ===
In May 2014, Rick Stansbury was back into coaching as an assistant at Texas A&M for Billy Kennedy. On April 10, 2015, Stansbury was promoted to Associate Head Coach. Stansbury was instrumental in assembling a recruiting class for the Aggies that earned a consensus top-10 national ranking and was widely viewed as one of the most impressive in the school's history. During the 2015–2016 season, Texas A&M won their first SEC Regular Season title in school history. They also advanced to the Sweet Sixteen in the NCAA tournament, after the historic comeback victory against the University of Northern Iowa.

=== Western Kentucky ===
On March 28, 2016, Stansbury was hired as head coach at Western Kentucky University, replacing Ray Harper. During Stansbury's time on the Hill, he led the Hilltoppers to four 20-win seasons, 11 Power Five victories, a Conference USA Eastern Season title, a National Invitational Tournament (NIT) semifinal appearance, and a Conference USA Regular Season title.

Stansbury led Western Kentucky to 11 victories over Power Five teams, including four wins against ranked opponents. In comparison, the remaining 13 teams in Conference USA collectively secured just seven such wins. Western Kentucky defeated four top 20 ranked teams: #16 Purdue, #18 West Virginia, #15 Wisconsin, and at #8 Alabama Crimson Tide (The only home loss of Alabama's season). In the two seasons before COVID-19 restrictions hit, Western Kentucky's E.A. Diddle Arena was sold out preseason for consecutive seasons for the first time in school history. The Hilltoppers defeated their in-state rival Louisville Cardinals during the 2020–21 season, marking the program's first ever win over Louisville in E.A. Diddle Arena.

From 2017 to 2022, Western Kentucky consistently ranked among the top teams in the conference, finishing either first or second in the regular season or conference tournament each year. The Hilltoppers were 1 of 17 teams in the country to finish with at least 19 wins each season. Western Kentucky achieved outright top-3 finishes in conference play for four consecutive seasons, the first time they have done so since 1969–72.

In 2021–22, the Hilltoppers became the first team in Conference USA history to reach the conference championship game in three consecutive seasons. Stansbury moved into 8th all-time in Conference USA wins during the 2022–23 season.

=== Memphis ===
After the 2022–23 season, Stansbury was hired at Memphis, joining Penny Hardaway. While Hardaway was suspended in 2023–24, Stansbury took over as interim Head Coach; he won all the games while Hardaway was suspended, including a win at Missouri.

Stansbury was tasked with recruiting and constructing through the transfer portal. Memphis secured the nation's No. 2 recruiting class in 2023–24 and the No. 9 class in the country in 2024–25. Memphis was in the top 10 of the RPI rankings for 21 weeks during the 2024–25 season, marking the most sustained stretch of statistical performance in program history. The previous high for Memphis was 18 weeks, achieved in both 2005–06 and 2007–08.

The 2024–25 team had three former transfers named to the conference's first team, the most ever in American Conference history. Memphis won the American Conference Regular Season for the first time in program history.

=== LSU ===
On April 3, 2026, Stansbury was named the associate head coach for Louisiana State University, joining Will Wade and his staff.

== Personal life ==
Stansbury is married to his wife, Meo, and has three sons, Isaac, Noah and Luke. Isaac played five years for the Mississippi State Bulldogs and is the current director of analytics and scouting for LSU. Noah played three season for the Western Kentucky Hilltoppers, one season for the Memphis Tigers, and is the current director of player personnel for the Ole Miss Rebels. Luke player three seasons for the Stephen F. Austin Lumberjacks, before following Rick to LSU ahead of his senior year.

== Head coaching record ==
Record table
Season	Team	Overall	Conference	Standing	Postseason
Mississippi State Bulldogs (Southeastern Conference) (1998–2012)
1998–99	Mississippi State	20–13	8–8	3rd (West)	NIT first round
1999–00	Mississippi State	14–16	5–11	5th (West)	
2000–01	Mississippi State	18–13	7–9	4th (West)	NIT quarterfinal
2001–02	Mississippi State	27–8	10–6	2nd (West)	NCAA Division I Second Round
2002–03	Mississippi State	21–10	9–7	1st (West)	NCAA Division I First Round
2003–04	Mississippi State	26–4	14–2	1st (West)	NCAA Division I Second Round
2004–05	Mississippi State	23–11	9–7	3rd (West)	NCAA Division I Second Round
2005–06	Mississippi State	15–15	5–11	4th (West)	
2006–07	Mississippi State	21–14	8–8	T–1st (West)	NIT semifinal
2007–08	Mississippi State	23–11	12–4	1st (West)	NCAA Division I Second Round
2008–09	Mississippi State	23–13	9–7	3rd (West)	NCAA Division I First Round
2009–10	Mississippi State	24–12	9–7	T–1st (West)	NIT second round
2010–11	Mississippi State	17–14	9–7	2nd (West)	
2011–12	Mississippi State	21–12	8–8	6th	NIT first round
Mississippi State:		293–166 (.638)	122–102 (.545)		
Western Kentucky Hilltoppers (Conference USA) (2016–2023)
2016–17	Western Kentucky	15–17	9–9	7th	
2017–18	Western Kentucky	27–11	14–4	3rd	NIT semifinal
2018–19	Western Kentucky	20–14	11–7	2nd	
2019–20	Western Kentucky	20–10	13–5	2nd	Postseason not held (Covid-19)
2020–21	Western Kentucky	21–8	11–3	1st (East)	NIT quarterfinal
2021–22	Western Kentucky	19–13	11–7	T–2nd (East)	
2022–23	Western Kentucky	17–16	8–12	6th	
Western Kentucky:		139–89 (.610)	77–47 (.621)		
Total:		442–255 (.634)			
National champion Postseason invitational champion Conference regular season champion Conference regular season and conference tournament champion Division regular season champion Division regular season and conference tournament champion Conference tournament champion
