= Mike Gillespie (basketball) =

Biographical details
- Born: April 2, 1951 (age 75); Joliet, Illinois, U.S.

Playing career
- 1971–1974: DePaul

Coaching career (HC unless noted)
- 1988–1990: Saint Leo
- 1991–2001: Tallahassee CC
- 2001–2007: Florida A&M

Head coaching record
- Overall: 116–122 (college)
- Tournaments: 1–2 (NCAA Division I)

Accomplishments and honors

Championships
- 2 MEAC tournament (2004, 2007)

Mike Gillespie (born April 2, 1951) is the former head men's basketball coach at Florida A&M University.

== High school coaching ==
Gillespie began coaching career on the high school level in his home state, winning 223 games from 1974 through 1987.

== College coaching ==
Starting in 1988, Gillespie coached at St. Leo College (now St. Leo University) in St. Leo, Florida, just north of Tampa. There, he won 26 games in two seasons (1988–89 to 1989–90), including a 15–12 mark his first year.

Gillespie then moved to Tallahassee, where he built the now nationally renowned Tallahassee Community College program from scratch. From 1991–92 to 2000–01, Gillespie guided the Eagles to 258 wins in 10 seasons. Compiling back-to-back 30-plus win seasons in 1995–96 (30–2) and 1996–97 (35–2), his teams were annually ranked among the nation's best junior college programs.

He then moved to Division I Florida A&M, where he compiled a record of 60–64, won two MEAC men's basketball tournament championships, and made two NCAA Division I men's basketball tournament appearances, in 2004 and 2007. In his last season, he led the Rattlers to their first 20-win season since 1989–90.

== Stalking charges ==
Beginning in March 2005, police investigated Gillespie several times on stalking complaints, and warned Gillespie to stop his behavior.

On May 25, 2007, Gillespie was arrested on a misdemeanor stalking charge. His accuser had previously reported Gillespie to police on May 15, 2007, but declined to file charges. However, she filed charges after he stalked her at work again on May 24 and 25. Gillespie was released from jail on a $1,000 bond.

Florida A&M put Gillespie on paid administrative leave on May 30, and fired him on August 14, 2007, citing the stalking charges.

== Professional coaching career ==
The Jacksonville JAM, Jacksonville's professional basketball team, hired Mike Gillespie as head coach for the 2007–08 Premier Basketball League season.

== Head coaching record ==
=== College ===
Record table
Season	Team	Overall	Conference	Standing	Postseason
Saint Leo Lions (Sunshine State Conference) (1988–1990)
1988–89	Saint Leo	15–12	5–7		
1989–90	Saint Leo	11–16	1–11		
Saint Leo:		26–28	6–18		
Florida A&M (Mid-Eastern Athletic Conference) (2001–2007)
2001–02	Florida A&M	9–19	9–9	T–6th	
2002–03	Florida A&M	17–12	11–7	T–4th	
2003–04	Florida A&M	15–17	10–8	T–5th	NCAA Division I first round
2004–05	Florida A&M	14–15	10–8	7th	
2005–06	Florida A&M	14–17	10–8	T–5th	
2006–07	Florida A&M	21–14	12–6	2nd	NCAA Division I Opening Round
Florida A&M:		90–94	62–46		
Total:		116–122			
National champion Postseason invitational champion Conference regular season champion Conference regular season and conference tournament champion Division regular season champion Division regular season and conference tournament champion Conference tournament champion
