= 2004 MEAC men's basketball tournament =

- Classification: Division I
- Season: 2003–04
- Teams: 11
- Site: Arthur Ashe Athletic Center; Richmond, Virginia
- Champions: Florida A&M (3rd title)
- Winning coach: Mike Gillespie (1st title)
- MVP: Terrence Woods (Florida A&M)

2003–04 MEAC men's basketball standings
	Conf.				Overall
Team	W		L	PCT	W		L	PCT
South Carolina State	14	–	4	.778	18	–	11	.621
Coppin State	14	–	4	.778	18	–	14	.563
Delaware State	11	–	7	.611	13	–	15	.464
Hampton	11	–	7	.611	13	–	17	.433
Florida A&M †	10	–	8	.556	15	–	17	.469
Norfolk State	10	–	8	.556	12	–	17	.414
Morgan State	9	–	9	.500	11	–	16	.407
Bethune–Cookman	7	–	11	.389	8	–	21	.276
Maryland Eastern Shore	6	–	12	.333	8	–	21	.276
Howard	4	–	14	.222	6	–	22	.214
North Carolina A&T	3	–	15	.167	3	–	25	.107
† 2004 MEAC tournament winner Rankings from AP Poll

The 2004 Mid-Eastern Athletic Conference men's basketball tournament took place March 8–13, 2004, at the Arthur Ashe Athletic Center in Richmond, Virginia. Florida A&M defeated Eagles, 58–51 in the championship game, to capture its first MEAC Tournament title. The Rattlers earned an automatic bid to the 2004 NCAA tournament as No. 16 seed in the East region. In the play-in round, Florida A&M defeated Lehigh to advance to the round of 64 where they fell to No. 1 seed Kentucky 96–76.

== Format ==
All eleven conference members participated, with the top 5 teams receiving a bye to the quarterfinal round. After seeds 6 through 11 completed games in the first round, teams were re-seeded. The lowest remaining seed was slotted against the top seed, next lowest remaining faced the #2 seed, and third lowest remaining seed squared off against the #3 seed.

== Bracket ==
First round Tuesday-Wednesday, March 8–9
8	Bethune–Cookman	50
9	Maryland Eastern Shore	51
6	Norfolk State	58
11	North Carolina A&T	43
7	Morgan State	60
10	Howard	59

Quarterfinals; Wednesday-Thursday, March 10–11
1	South Carolina State	84
9	MD-Eastern Shore	56
4	Hampton	71
5	Florida A&M	72
6	Norfolk State	55
3	Delaware State	67
2	Coppin State	68
7	Morgan State	65

Semifinals; Friday, March 12
1	South Carolina State	53
5	Florida A&M	65
3	Delaware State	52
2	Coppin State	55

Final; Saturday, March 13
5	Florida A&M	58
2	Coppin State	51
