= 2003–04 Vanderbilt Commodores men's basketball team =

American college basketball season

2003–04 Vanderbilt Commodores men's basketball

NCAA tournament, Sweet Sixteen
- Conference: Southeastern Conference

Ranking
- Coaches: No. 25
- Record: 23–10 (8–8 SEC)
- Head coach: Kevin Stallings
- Assistant coaches: Dan Muller; Tom Richardson; Jeff Jackson
- Home arena: Memorial Gymnasium

2003–04 Southeastern Conference men's basketball standings
	Conf.				Overall
Team	W		L	PCT	W		L	PCT
East
No. 2 Kentucky †	13	–	3	.813	27	–	5	.844
Florida	9	–	7	.563	20	–	11	.645
No. 23 South Carolina	8	–	8	.500	23	–	11	.676
Vanderbilt	8	–	8	.500	23	–	10	.697
Georgia	7	–	9	.438	16	–	14	.533
Tennessee	7	–	9	.438	15	–	14	.517
West
No. 8 Mississippi State	14	–	2	.875	26	–	4	.867
LSU	8	–	8	.500	18	–	11	.621
Alabama	8	–	8	.500	20	–	13	.606
Auburn	5	–	11	.313	14	–	14	.500
Ole Miss	5	–	11	.313	13	–	15	.464
Arkansas	4	–	12	.250	12	–	16	.429
† 2004 SEC tournament winner Rankings from AP Poll

The 2003–04 Vanderbilt Commodores men's basketball men's basketball team finished with a 23–10 record (SEC East: 8–8, 4th) and reached the Sweet 16 of the NCAA tournament. The Commodores were ranked No. 25 in the final ESPN/USA Today (Coaches) poll.

The team was led by head coach Kevin Stallings and played its home games at Memorial Gymnasium.

== Roster ==
2003–04 Vanderbilt Commodores men's basketball team
Players	Coaches
Pos. / # / Name / Height / Weight / Year / Hometown; F / 35 / Matt Freije / 6 ft 10 in (2.08 m) / 240 lb (109 kg) / Sr / Shawnee Mission, Kansas	Head coach: Kevin Stallings; Assistant coach(es) Legend: (C) Team captain; (S) Suspended; (I) Ineligible; (W) Walk-on; Injured; Current redshirt

== Schedule and results ==
Date time, TV	Rank^{#}	Opponent^{#}	Result	Record	Site (attendance) city, state
Regular season
Nov 21, 2003*		at Belmont	W 74–59	1–0	Curb Event Center; Nashville, Tennessee
Nov 24, 2003*		Indiana	W 73–60	2–0	Memorial Gymnasium; Nashville, Tennessee
Nov 29, 2003*		Tennessee-Martin	W 94–60	3–0	Memorial Gymnasium; Nashville, Tennessee
Dec 3, 2003*		IUPUI	W 86–68	4–0	Memorial Gymnasium; Nashville, Tennessee
Dec 6, 2003*		Michigan	W 83–63	5–0	Memorial Gymnasium; Nashville, Tennessee
Dec 10, 2003*		Tennessee State	W 85–64	6–0	Memorial Gymnasium; Nashville, Tennessee
Dec 13, 2003*		Tennessee Tech	W 98–79	7–0	Memorial Gymnasium; Nashville, Tennessee
Dec 20, 2003*		Wofford	W 90–59	8–0	Memorial Gymnasium; Nashville, Tennessee
Dec 22, 2003*	No. 25	Appalachian State	W 63–48	9–0	Memorial Gymnasium; Nashville, Tennessee
Dec 30, 2003*	No. 22	Lehigh	W 85–59	10–0	Memorial Gymnasium; Nashville, Tennessee
Jan 3, 2004*	No. 22	at TCU	W 95–60	11–0	Daniel-Meyer Coliseum; Fort Worth, Texas
Jan 7, 2004	No. 20	Auburn	W 59–53	12–0 (1–0)	Memorial Gymnasium; Nashville, Tennessee
Jan 10, 2004	No. 20	at No. 7 Kentucky	L 63–75	12–1 (1–1)	Rupp Arena; Lexington, Kentucky
Jan 14, 2004	No. 23	at Tennessee	L 66–76	12–2 (1–2)	Thompson-Boling Arena; Knoxville, Tennessee
Jan 17, 2004	No. 23	No. 15 Florida	W 86–72	13–2 (2–2)	Memorial Gymnasium; Nashville, Tennessee
Jan 24, 2004	No. 22	at Arkansas	L 62–70	13–3 (2–3)	Bud Walton Arena; Fayetteville, Arkansas
Jan 28, 2004	No. 22	No. 24 South Carolina	L 55–57	13–4 (2–4)	Memorial Gymnasium; Nashville, Tennessee
Jan 31, 2004		No. 5 Kentucky	W 66–60	14–4 (3–4)	Memorial Gymnasium; Nashville, Tennessee
Feb 7, 2004		at No. 21 Florida	L 71–81	14–5 (3–5)	Stephen C. O'Connell Center; Gainesville, Florida
Feb 11, 2004		Georgia	W 61–39	15–5 (4–5)	Memorial Gymnasium; Nashville, Tennessee
Feb 14, 2004		at No. 25 South Carolina	L 75–82	15–6 (4–6)	Colonial Center; Columbia, South Carolina
Feb 18, 2004		at Alabama	W 70–67	16–6 (5–6)	Coleman Coliseum; Tuscaloosa, Alabama
Feb 21, 2004		No. 24 LSU	W 74–54	17–6 (6–6)	Memorial Gymnasium; Nashville, Tennessee
Feb 25, 2004		at Ole Miss	W 77–65	18–6 (7–6)	Tad Smith Coliseum; Oxford, Mississippi
Feb 28, 2004		No. 7 Mississippi State	L 69–72	18–7 (7–7)	Memorial Gymnasium; Nashville, Tennessee
Mar 3, 2004		Tennessee	W 61–58	19–7 (8–7)	Memorial Gymnasium; Nashville, Tennessee
Mar 6, 2004		at Georgia	L 61–71	19–8 (8–8)	Stegeman Coliseum; Athens, Georgia
SEC tournament
Mar 11, 2004*		vs. Ole Miss; First round	W 70–50	20–8	Georgia Dome; Atlanta, Georgia
Mar 12, 2004*		vs. No. 4 Mississippi State; Quarterfinals	W 74–70 ^{OT}	21–8	Georgia Dome; Atlanta, Georgia
Mar 13, 2004*		vs. Florida; Semifinals	L 69–91	21–9	Georgia Dome; Atlanta, Georgia
NCAA tournament
Mar 19, 2004*; CBS	(6)	vs. (11) Western Michigan; First round	W 71–58	22–9	Pepsi Center; Denver, Colorado
Mar 21, 2004*; CBS	(6)	vs. (3) No. 15 NC State; Second Round	W 75–73	23–9	Pepsi Center; Denver, Colorado
Mar 25, 2004*; CBS	(6)	vs. (2) No. 7 Connecticut; Regional semifinal – Sweet Sixteen	L 53–73	23–10	US Airways Center (17,889); Phoenix, Arizona
*Non-conference game. ^{#}Rankings from AP Poll. (#) Tournament seedings in parentheses. All times are in Central Time.
