= 2003–04 Alabama Crimson Tide men's basketball team =

American college basketball season

2003–04 Alabama Crimson Tide men's basketball

NCAA tournament, Elite Eight
- Conference: Southeastern Conference
- Western Division

Ranking
- Coaches: No. 17
- Record: 20–13 (8–8 SEC)
- Head coach: Mark Gottfried (6th season)
- Assistant coaches: Philip Pearson; Orlando Early; Tom Asbury
- Home arena: Coleman Coliseum (Capacity: 15,316)

2003–04 Southeastern Conference men's basketball standings
| | Conf. | | | | Overall |
| Team | W | | L | PCT | W | | L | PCT |
|---|---|---|---|---|---|---|---|---|
East
| No. 2 Kentucky † | 13 | – | 3 | .813 | 27 | – | 5 | .844 |
| Florida | 9 | – | 7 | .563 | 20 | – | 11 | .645 |
| No. 23 South Carolina | 8 | – | 8 | .500 | 23 | – | 11 | .676 |
| Vanderbilt | 8 | – | 8 | .500 | 23 | – | 10 | .697 |
| Georgia | 7 | – | 9 | .438 | 16 | – | 14 | .533 |
| Tennessee | 7 | – | 9 | .438 | 15 | – | 14 | .517 |
West
| No. 8 Mississippi State | 14 | – | 2 | .875 | 26 | – | 4 | .867 |
| LSU | 8 | – | 8 | .500 | 18 | – | 11 | .621 |
| Alabama | 8 | – | 8 | .500 | 20 | – | 13 | .606 |
| Auburn | 5 | – | 11 | .313 | 14 | – | 14 | .500 |
| Ole Miss | 5 | – | 11 | .313 | 13 | – | 15 | .464 |
| Arkansas | 4 | – | 12 | .250 | 12 | – | 16 | .429 |
† 2004 SEC tournament winner Rankings from AP Poll

The 2003–04 Alabama Crimson Tide men's basketball team (variously "Alabama", "UA", "Bama" or "The Tide") represented the University of Alabama in the 2003–04 college basketball season. The head coach was Mark Gottfried, who was in his sixth season at Alabama. The team played its home games at Coleman Coliseum in Tuscaloosa, Alabama and was a member of the Southeastern Conference. This was the 92nd season of basketball in the school's history. The Crimson Tide finished the season 20–13, 8–8 in SEC play, and lost in the second round of the 2004 SEC men's basketball tournament. They were invited to the NCAA tournament and advanced to the Elite Eight before losing to the eventual national champions, UCONN. Until the 2023-24 season, this was Alabama's only Elite Eight appearance.

== Roster ==
| # | Name | Class | Position | Height | Weight | Home Town |
|---|---|---|---|---|---|---|
| 1 | Chuck Davis | Sophomore | Guard | 6–3 | 230 | Selma, AL |
| 2 | Emmett Thomas | Senior | Forward | 6–4 | 205 | Birmingham, AL |
| 3 | Kennedy Winston | Sophomore | Forward | 6–7 | 230 | Prichard, AL |
| 4 | Reggie Rambo | Senior | Forward | 6–7 | 225 | Lena, LA |
| 5 | Earnest Shelton | Junior | Guard | 6–3 | 215 | Memphis, TN |
| 13 | Lucky Williams | Sophomore | Forward | 6–6 | 210 | Nigeria, AL |
| 21 | Evan Brock | Sophomore | Forward | 6–9 | 210 | Roswell, GA |
| 23 | Demetrius Smith | Senior | Guard | 6–3 | 210 | Hogansville, GA |
| 24 | Jason Reese | Junior | Guard | 6–2 | 215 | Birmingham, AL |
| 33 | Akini Akini | Freshman | Forward | 6–10 | 231 | Tallahassee, FL |
| 33 | Jermareo Davidson | Freshman | Forward | 6–10 | 230 | Atlanta, GA |
| 50 | Antoine Pettway | Senior | Guard | 6–0 | 170 | Camden, AL |

== Schedule and results ==
| Date time, TV | Rank^{#} | Opponent^{#} | Result | Record | Site (attendance) city, state |
Exhibition
| November 8, 2003*; 6:00 p.m. | | Global Sports | W 75–69 | | Coleman Coliseum; Tuscaloosa, AL |
Non-conference regular season
| November 14, 2003*; 6:00 p.m. | | vs. No. 22 Pittsburgh; Coaches vs. Cancer Classic | L 62–71 | 0–1 | Madison Square Garden; New York, NY |
| November 21, 2003*; 7:00 p.m. | | Louisiana Tech | W 69–63 | 1–1 | Coleman Coliseum (7,499); Tuscaloosa, AL |
| November 25, 2003*; 7:00 p.m. | | Southeastern Louisiana | W 83–76 | 2–1 | Coleman Coliseum (6,974); Tuscaloosa, AL |
| November 29, 2003*; 6:30 p.m. | | at Providence | L 71–76 | 2–2 | Dunkin' Donuts Center (9,256); Providence RI |
| December 3, 2003*; 8:00 p.m. | | Charlotte | W 79–72 | 3–2 | Coleman Coliseum (7,645); Tuscaloosa, AL |
| December 6, 2003*; 4:00 p.m. | | Austin Peay | W 65–47 | 4–2 | Coleman Coliseum (7,635); Tuscaloosa, AL |
| December 16, 2003*; 7:00 p.m. | | Chattanooga | W 76–72 | 5–2 | Coleman Coliseum (7,787); Tuscaloosa, AL |
| December 20, 2003*; 9:00 p.m. | | vs. Oregon; Las Vegas Showdown | W 87–86 | 6–2 | Thomas & Mack Center; Paradise, NV |
| December 27, 2003*; 6:00 p.m. | | Mercer | W 101–44 | 7–2 | Coleman Coliseum (7,685); Tuscaloosa, AL |
| December 30, 2003*; 8:00 p.m. | | No. 18 Wisconsin | W 71–56 | 8–2 | Coleman Coliseum (10,714); Tuscaloosa, AL |
| January 3, 2004*; 2:30 p.m. | | at Xavier | L 47–68 | 8–3 | Cintas Center (10,250); Cincinnati, OH |
SEC regular season
| January 10, 2004; 2:00 p.m. | | at LSU | L 66–70 | 8–4 (0–1) | Pete Maravich Assembly Center (9,943); Baton Rouge, LA |
| January 14, 2004; 7:00 p.m. | | Arkansas | W 81–65 | 9–4 (1–1) | Coleman Coliseum (8,956); Tuscaloosa, AL |
| January 17, 2004; 6:00 p.m. | | Auburn; Iron Bowl of basketball | W 69–46 | 10–4 (2–1) | Coleman Coliseum (15,316); Tuscaloosa, AL |
| January 21, 2004; 6:00 p.m. | | at Georgia | W 45–42 | 11–4 (3–1) | Stegeman Coliseum (8,088); Athens, GA |
| January 24, 2004; 5:00 p.m. | | at Ole Miss | L 60–71 | 11–5 (3–2) | Tad Smith Coliseum (6,025); Oxford, MS |
| January 27, 2004; 7:30 p.m. | | No. 22 Florida | L 78–88 | 11–6 (3–3) | Coleman Coliseum (10,125); Tuscaloosa, AL |
| January 31, 2004; 6:00 p.m. | | LSU | L 54–60 | 11–7 (3–4) | Coleman Coliseum (11,360); Tuscaloosa, AL |
| February 4, 2004; 6:30 p.m. | | at No. 25 South Carolina | L 82–90 ^{OT} | 11–8 (3–5) | Colonial Center (16,227); Columbia, SC |
| February 10, 2004; 6:00 p.m. | | at No. 8 Kentucky | L 55–66 | 11–9 (3–6) | Rupp Arena (22,042); Lexington, KY |
| February 14, 2004; 2:00 p.m. | | Tennessee | W 83–70 | 12–9 (4–6) | Coleman Coliseum (10,190); Tuscaloosa, AL |
| February 18, 2004; 7:00 p.m. | | Vanderbilt | L 67–70 | 12–10 (4–7) | Coleman Coliseum (7,875); Tuscaloosa, AL |
| February 21, 2004; 3:00 p.m. | | at No. 4 Mississippi State | W 77–73 | 13–10 (5–7) | Humphrey Coliseum (10,437); Starkville, MS |
| February 24, 2004; 8:00 p.m. | | at Auburn; Iron Bowl of basketball | W 72–71 | 14–10 (6–7) | Beard-Eaves-Memorial Coliseum (10,500); Auburn, AL |
| February 28, 2004; 3:00 p.m. | | Ole Miss | W 84–69 | 15–10 (7–7) | Coleman Coliseum (10,175); Tuscaloosa, AL |
| March 3, 2004; 7:00 p.m. | | at Arkansas | W 72–68 ^{OT} | 16–10 (8–7) | Bud Walton Arena (15,626); Fayetteville, Arkansas |
| March 6, 2004; 2:00 p.m. | | No. 5 Mississippi State | L 81–82 ^{OT} | 16–11 (8–8) | Coleman Coliseum (15,316); Tuscaloosa, AL |
SEC tournament
| March 11, 2004; 8:45 p.m. | (W3) | vs. (E6) Tennessee; First Round | W 84–49 | 17–11 | Georgia Dome (13,393); Atlanta, GA |
| March 12, 2004; 8:45 p.m. | (W3) | vs. (E2) Florida; Second Round | L 73–75 ^{OT} | 17–12 | Georgia Dome (18,916); Atlanta, GA |
NCAA tournament
| March 18, 2004*; 2:40 pm | (8) | vs. (9) Southern Illinois; First round | W 65–64 | 18–12 | KeyArena (15,512); Seattle, WA |
| March 20, 2004*; 5:40 pm | (8) | vs. (1) No. 1 Stanford; Second round | W 70–67 | 19–12 | KeyArena (15,827); Seattle, WA |
| March 25, 2004*; 9:40 pm | (8) | vs. (5) No. 20 Syracuse; Sweet Sixteen | W 80–71 | 20–12 | America West Arena (17,684); Phoenix, Arizona |
| March 27, 2004*; 4:40 pm | (8) | vs. (2) No. 7 Connecticut; Elite Eight | L 71–87 | 20–13 | America West Arena (17,889); Phoenix, Arizona |
*Non-conference game. ^{#}Rankings from AP Poll. (#) Tournament seedings in parentheses. All times are in Central Time.

== See also ==
- 2004 NCAA Division I men's basketball tournament
- 2003–04 NCAA Division I men's basketball season
- 2003–04 NCAA Division I men's basketball rankings
