= 2003–04 Louisiana–Lafayette Ragin' Cajuns men's basketball team =

American college basketball season

2003–04 Louisiana–Lafayette Ragin' Cajuns men's basketball

Sun Belt tournament champions Sun Belt West division champions

NCAA tournament
- Conference: Sun Belt Conference
- West
- Record: 20–9 (12–3 Sun Belt)
- Head coach: Jessie Evans (7th season)
- Assistant coach: Robert Lee
- Home arena: Cajundome

2003–04 Sun Belt Conference men's basketball standings
	Conf.				Overall
Team	W		L	PCT	W		L	PCT
East
Arkansas-Little Rock	9	–	5	.643	17	–	12	.586
Western Kentucky	8	–	6	.571	15	–	13	.536
Middle Tennessee	8	–	6	.571	17	–	12	.586
Arkansas State	7	–	7	.500	17	–	11	.607
Florida International	1	–	13	.071	5	–	22	.185
West
Louisiana–Lafayette †	12	–	3	.800	20	–	9	.690
New Orleans	9	–	6	.600	17	–	14	.548
North Texas	8	–	7	.533	13	–	15	.464
South Alabama	6	–	9	.400	12	–	16	.429
Denver	6	–	9	.400	14	–	13	.519
New Mexico State	6	–	9	.400	13	–	14	.481
† 2004 Sun Belt Conference tournament winner Rankings from AP poll

The 2003–04 Louisiana–Lafayette Ragin' Cajuns men's basketball team represented the University of Louisiana at Lafayette during the 2003–04 NCAA Division I men's basketball season. The Ragin' Cajuns, led by seventh-year head coach Jessie Evans, played their home games at the Cajundome and were members of the Sun Belt Conference. They finished the season 20–9, 12–3 in Sun Belt play to finish in first place. They were champions of the Sun Belt Conference tournament to earn an automatic bid to the NCAA tournament where they lost in the first round to NC State.

== Roster ==
2003–04 Louisiana Ragin' Cajuns men's basketball team
Players	Coaches
Pos. / # / Name / Height / Weight / Year / Hometown; G / 5 / Orien Greene / 6 ft 4 in (1.93 m) / 205 lb (93 kg) / Jr	Head coach: Jessie Evans; Assistant coach(es) Legend: (C) Team captain; (S) Suspended; (I) Ineligible; (W) Walk-on; Injured; Current redshirt

== Schedule and results ==
Date time, TV	Rank^{#}	Opponent^{#}	Result	Record	Site (attendance) city, state
Regular season
Nov 18, 2003*		at Georgia Tech	L 45–79	0–1	Alexander Memorial Coliseum (5,344); Atlanta, Georgia
Dec 9, 2003*		at No. 25 Dayton	L 59–66	1–2	University of Dayton Arena (12,055); Dayton, Ohio
Dec 20, 2003*		at Xavier	L 74–78	3–3	Cintas Center (9,980); Cincinnati, Ohio
Dec 28, 2003*		vs. Valparaiso	W 95–71	4–3	McKale Center (6,200); Tucson, Arizona
Dec 30, 2003*		at No. 5 Arizona	L 69–72	4–4	McKale Center (14,565); Tucson, Arizona
Sun Belt tournament
Mar 6, 2004*		vs. South Alabama; Quarterfinals	W 84–58	18–8	E. A. Diddle Arena; Bowling Green, Kentucky
Mar 8, 2004*		vs. Middle Tennessee; Semifinals	W 70–66	19–8	E. A. Diddle Arena; Bowling Green, Kentucky
Mar 9, 2004*		vs. New Orleans; Championship game	W 67–58	20–8	E. A. Diddle Arena; Bowling Green, Kentucky
NCAA tournament
Mar 19, 2004*	(14 PHX)	vs. (3 PHX) No. 15 NC State; First round	L 52–61	20–9	Amway Arena; Orlando, Florida
*Non-conference game. ^{#}Rankings from AP Poll. (#) Tournament seedings in parentheses. PHX=Phoenix. All times are in Central Time.
