= 2004 Sun Belt Conference men's basketball tournament =

- Classification: Division I
- Season: 2003–04
- Teams: 11
- Site: E. A. Diddle Arena; Bowling Green, KY
- Champions: Louisiana–Lafayette (4th title)
- Winning coach: Jessie Evans (2nd title)
- MVP: Bo McCalebb (New Orleans)

2003–04 Sun Belt Conference men's basketball standings
	Conf.				Overall
Team	W		L	PCT	W		L	PCT
East
Arkansas-Little Rock	9	–	5	.643	17	–	12	.586
Western Kentucky	8	–	6	.571	15	–	13	.536
Middle Tennessee	8	–	6	.571	17	–	12	.586
Arkansas State	7	–	7	.500	17	–	11	.607
Florida International	1	–	13	.071	5	–	22	.185
West
Louisiana–Lafayette †	12	–	3	.800	20	–	9	.690
New Orleans	9	–	6	.600	17	–	14	.548
North Texas	8	–	7	.533	13	–	15	.464
South Alabama	6	–	9	.400	12	–	16	.429
Denver	6	–	9	.400	14	–	13	.519
New Mexico State	6	–	9	.400	13	–	14	.481
† 2004 Sun Belt Conference tournament winner Rankings from AP poll

The 2004 Sun Belt Conference men's basketball tournament was held March 6–9 at E. A. Diddle Arena in Bowling Green, Kentucky.

Top-seed Louisiana–Lafayette defeated #3 seed New Orleans in the championship game, 67–58, to win their fourth Sun Belt men's basketball tournament.

The Ragin' Cajuns received an automatic bid to the 2004 NCAA tournament as the #14 seed in the Phoenix region. No other Sun Belt members earned bids to the tournament.

== Format ==
Eight of eleven participating Sun Belt members were seeded based on regular season conference records.

== Bracket ==
Quarterfinals; Friday, March 6 Saturday, March 7
1	Louisiana–Lafayette	84
8	South Alabama	58
4	Western Kentucky	62
5	Middle Tennessee	76
3	New Orleans	91^{OT}
6	North Texas	89
2	Arkansas–Little Rock	83^{OT}
7	Arkansas State	78

Semifinals; Monday, March 8
1	Louisiana–Lafayette	70
5	Middle Tennessee	66
3	New Orleans	80
2	Arkansas–Little Rock	65

Championship; Tuesday, March 9
1	Louisiana–Lafayette	67
3	New Orleans	58

== See also ==
- Sun Belt Conference women's basketball tournament
