= 2003–04 South Carolina Gamecocks men's basketball team =

American college basketball season

2003–04 South Carolina Gamecocks men's basketball

NCAA tournament, First Round
- Conference: Southeastern Conference
- East
- Record: 23–11 (8–8 SEC)
- Head coach: Dave Odom (3rd season)
- Home arena: Colonial Center

2003–04 Southeastern Conference men's basketball standings
	Conf.				Overall
Team	W		L	PCT	W		L	PCT
East
No. 2 Kentucky †	13	–	3	.813	27	–	5	.844
Florida	9	–	7	.563	20	–	11	.645
No. 23 South Carolina	8	–	8	.500	23	–	11	.676
Vanderbilt	8	–	8	.500	23	–	10	.697
Georgia	7	–	9	.438	16	–	14	.533
Tennessee	7	–	9	.438	15	–	14	.517
West
No. 8 Mississippi State	14	–	2	.875	26	–	4	.867
LSU	8	–	8	.500	18	–	11	.621
Alabama	8	–	8	.500	20	–	13	.606
Auburn	5	–	11	.313	14	–	14	.500
Ole Miss	5	–	11	.313	13	–	15	.464
Arkansas	4	–	12	.250	12	–	16	.429
† 2004 SEC tournament winner Rankings from AP Poll

The 2003–04 South Carolina Gamecocks men's basketball team represented the University of South Carolina as a member of the Southeastern Conference during the 2003–04 men's college basketball season. The team was led by head coach Dave Odom and played their home games at the Colonial Center in Columbia, South Carolina. The team finished third in the SEC East regular season standings and received an at-large bid to the 2004 NCAA tournament as No. 10 seed in the East region. The Gamecocks lost to 7 seed Memphis in the opening round to finish the season with a record of 23–11 (8–8 SEC).

== Roster ==
2003–04 South Carolina Gamecocks men's basketball team
Players
Coaches

Pos.	#	Name	Height	Weight	Year	Hometown
G	1	Tre' Kelley	6 ft 1 in (1.85 m)	185 lb (84 kg)	Fr	Washington, D.C.
F	15	Carlos Powell	6 ft 7 in (2.01 m)	220 lb (100 kg)	Jr	Florence, South Carolina
G	21	Tarence Kinsey	6 ft 6 in (1.98 m)	185 lb (84 kg)	So	Tampa, Florida
G	30	Michael Boynton	6 ft 2 in (1.88 m)	180 lb (82 kg)	Sr	Brooklyn, New York
G	31	Josh Gonner	6 ft 3 in (1.91 m)	180 lb (82 kg)	Jr	Fort Worth, Texas
F	32	Kerbrell Brown	6 ft 8 in (2.03 m)	220 lb (100 kg)	Sr	New Orleans, Louisiana
C	33	Brandon Wallace	6 ft 10 in (2.08 m)	200 lb (91 kg)	Fr	Jackson, South Carolina
F	34	Renaldo Balkman	6 ft 8 in (2.03 m)	205 lb (93 kg)	Fr	Staten Island, New York
F	55	Rolando Howell	6 ft 9 in (2.06 m)	220 lb (100 kg)	Sr	Columbia, South Carolina

Head coach

- Dave Odom

Assistant coach(es)

Legend

- (C) Team captain
- (S) Suspended
- (I) Ineligible
- (W) Walk-on
- Injured
- Current redshirt

Roster

== Schedule and results ==
Date time, TV	Rank^{#}	Opponent^{#}	Result	Record	Site city, state
Regular season
Nov 17, 2003*		Gardner-Webb	W 83–74	1–0	Colonial Center; Columbia, South Carolina
Nov 18, 2003*		Idaho	W 76–66	2–0	Colonial Center; Columbia, South Carolina
Nov 21, 2003*		Navy	W 73–40	3–0	Colonial Center; Columbia, South Carolina
Nov 24, 2003*		vs. Missouri State; Guardians Classic	W 77–64	4–0	Municipal Auditorium; Kansas City, Missouri
Nov 25, 2003*		vs. Richmond; Guardians Classic	W 67–61	5–0	Municipal Auditorium; Kansas City, Missouri
Nov 29, 2003*		Campbell	W 77–48	6–0	Colonial Center; Columbia, South Carolina
Dec 3, 2003*		at The Citadel	W 70–38	7–0	McAlister Field House; Charleston, South Carolina
Dec 6, 2003*		at Clemson	W 76–61	8–0	Littlejohn Coliseum; Clemson, South Carolina
Dec 15, 2003*		at Temple	L 61–71	8–1	Liacouras Center; Philadelphia, Pennsylvania
Dec 17, 2003*		Charleston Southern	W 71–36	9–1	Colonial Center; Columbia, South Carolina
Dec 20, 2003*		NC State	W 58–55	10–1	Colonial Center; Columbia, South Carolina
Dec 22, 2003*		South Carolina State	W 86–50	11–1	Colonial Center; Columbia, South Carolina
Dec 30, 2003*		Yale	W 59–48	12–1	Colonial Center; Columbia, South Carolina
Jan 2, 2004*		Appalachian State	W 78–58	13–1	Colonial Center; Columbia, South Carolina
Jan 7, 2004		No. 14 Florida	L 62–65	13–2 (0–1)	Colonial Center; Columbia, South Carolina
Mar 6, 2004		at Tennessee	L 56–63	21–9 (8–8)	Thompson-Boling Arena; Knoxville, Tennessee
SEC Tournament
Mar 11, 2004*	(E3)	vs. (W2) Arkansas; First round	W 91–81	22–9	Georgia Dome; Atlanta, Georgia
Mar 12, 2004*	(E3)	vs. (W2) LSU; Quarterfinals	W 85–64	23–9	Georgia Dome; Atlanta, Georgia
Mar 13, 2004*	(E3)	vs. (E1) No. 8 Kentucky; Semifinals	L 63–78	23–10	Georgia Dome; Atlanta, Georgia
NCAA Tournament
Mar 19, 2004*	(10 E)	vs. (7 E) No. 24 Memphis; First round	L 43–59	23–11	Kemper Arena; Kansas City, Missouri
*Non-conference game. ^{#}Rankings from AP Poll. (#) Tournament seedings in parentheses. E=East. All times are in Eastern Time.
