= 2003–04 Mississippi State Bulldogs men's basketball team =

American college basketball season

2003–04 Mississippi State Bulldogs men's basketball

SEC regular season champions

NCAA tournament, second round
- Conference: Southeastern Conference

Ranking
- Coaches: No. 13
- AP: No. 8
- Record: 26–4 (14–2 SEC)
- Head coach: Rick Stansbury (6th season)
- Assistant coaches: Phil Cunningham; Robert Kirby; Mark White
- Home arena: Humphrey Coliseum

2003–04 Southeastern Conference men's basketball standings
| | Conf. | | | | Overall |
| Team | W | | L | PCT | W | | L | PCT |
|---|---|---|---|---|---|---|---|---|
East
| No. 2 Kentucky † | 13 | – | 3 | .813 | 27 | – | 5 | .844 |
| Florida | 9 | – | 7 | .563 | 20 | – | 11 | .645 |
| No. 23 South Carolina | 8 | – | 8 | .500 | 23 | – | 11 | .676 |
| Vanderbilt | 8 | – | 8 | .500 | 23 | – | 10 | .697 |
| Georgia | 7 | – | 9 | .438 | 16 | – | 14 | .533 |
| Tennessee | 7 | – | 9 | .438 | 15 | – | 14 | .517 |
West
| No. 8 Mississippi State | 14 | – | 2 | .875 | 26 | – | 4 | .867 |
| LSU | 8 | – | 8 | .500 | 18 | – | 11 | .621 |
| Alabama | 8 | – | 8 | .500 | 20 | – | 13 | .606 |
| Auburn | 5 | – | 11 | .313 | 14 | – | 14 | .500 |
| Ole Miss | 5 | – | 11 | .313 | 13 | – | 15 | .464 |
| Arkansas | 4 | – | 12 | .250 | 12 | – | 16 | .429 |
† 2004 SEC tournament winner Rankings from AP Poll

The 2003–04 Mississippi State basketball team represented Mississippi State University as a member of the Southeastern Conference during the 2003–04 college basketball season. Under sixth-year head coach Rick Stansbury, the team played their home games at Humphrey Coliseum in Starkville, Mississippi. Mississippi State won the SEC West Division regular season title finishing six games ahead of LSU and Alabama. The Bulldogs were upset in the quarterfinal round of the SEC tournament, losing to Vanderbilt in overtime. The team received an at-large bid to the NCAA tournament as No. 2 seed in the Atlanta region. After an opening round win over No. 15 seed Monmouth, the Bulldogs were upset by No. 7 seed Xavier, a team they had beaten earlier in the season, 89–74. Mississippi State finished the season with a record of 26–4 (14–2 SEC).

== Roster ==
2003–04 Mississippi State Bulldogs men's basketball team
Players
Coaches

| Pos. | # | Name | Height | Weight | Year | Previous school | Hometown |
|---|---|---|---|---|---|---|---|
| G | 0 | Gary Ervin | 6 ft 0 in (1.83 m) | 180 lb (82 kg) | Fr | | Brooklyn, NY |
| PF | 4 | Lawrence Roberts | 6 ft 9 in (2.06 m) | 240 lb (109 kg) | Jr | Baylor | Houston, TX |
| G | 15 | Timmy Bowers | 6 ft 2 in (1.88 m) | 190 lb (86 kg) | Sr | Harrison Central HS | Gulfport, MS |
| G | 22 | Dietric Slater | 6 ft 3 in (1.91 m) | 190 lb (86 kg) | Fr | Wayne County HS | Waynesboro, MS |
| F | 41 | Piotr Stelmach | 6 ft 9 in (2.06 m) | 230 lb (104 kg) | Fr | SMS Warka | Kamien Pomorski, Poland |

Head coach

- Rick Stansbury (Campbellsville)

Assistant coach(es)

- Phil Cunningham (Campbellsville)
- Robert Kirby (UTPA)
- Mark White (Austin Peay)

Legend

- (C) Team captain
- (S) Suspended
- (I) Ineligible
- (W) Walk-on
- Injured
- Current redshirt

Roster

== Schedule and results ==
| Date time, TV | Rank^{#} | Opponent^{#} | Result | Record | Site city, state |
Non-conference Regular season
| Nov 22, 2003* | | Tennessee-Martin | W 90–74 | 1–0 | Humphrey Coliseum; Starkville, Mississippi |
| Nov 26, 2003* | | South Alabama | W 71–62 | 2–0 | Humphrey Coliseum; Starkville, Mississippi |
| Nov 29, 2003* | | at Western Kentucky | W 81–75 | 3–0 | E.A. Diddle Arena; Bowling Green, Kentucky |
| Dec 1, 2003* | | McNeese State | W 92–69 | 4–0 | Humphrey Coliseum; Starkville, Mississippi |
| Dec 3, 2003* | | Louisiana-Monroe | W 76–52 | 5–0 | Humphrey Coliseum; Starkville, Mississippi |
| Dec 6, 2003* | | UAB | W 86–84 | 6–0 | Humphrey Coliseum; Starkville, Mississippi |
| Dec 13, 2003* | | Xavier | W 82–70 | 7–0 | Humphrey Coliseum; Starkville, Mississippi |
| Dec 16, 2003* | | vs. New Orleans | W 77–59 | 8–0 | BankCorp South Arena |
| Dec 20, 2003* | | at Santa Clara | W 66–61 ^{OT} | 9–0 | Leavey Center; Santa Clara, California |
| Dec 27, 2003* | | at Tulane | W 72–50 | 10–0 | Avron B. Fogelman Arena; New Orleans, Louisiana |
| Jan 3, 2004* | No. 24 | at Little Rock | W 68–58 | 11–0 | Alltel Arena; Little Rock, Arkansas |
SEC Regular season
| Jan 7, 2004 | No. 22 | at Ole Miss | W 61–54 | 12–0 (1–0) | Tad Smith Coliseum; Oxford, Mississippi |
| Jan 10, 2004 | No. 22 | Arkansas | W 80–62 | 13–0 (2–0) | Humphrey Coliseum; Starkville, Mississippi |
| Jan 13, 2004; ESPN | No. 20 | No. 5 Kentucky | L 66–67 | 13–1 (2–1) | Humphrey Coliseum (10,432); Starkville, Mississippi |
| Jan 17, 2004 | No. 20 | at LSU | W 64–54 | 14–1 (3–1) | Maravich Assembly Center; Baton Rouge, Louisiana |
| Jan 21, 2004 | No. 19 | at No. 17 Florida | W 79–68 | 15–1 (4–1) | Stephen C. O'Connell Center; Gainesville, Florida |
| Jan 24, 2004 | No. 19 | Georgia | W 71–58 | 16–1 (5–1) | Humphrey Coliseum; Starkville, Mississippi |
| Jan 28, 2004 | No. 11 | Tennessee | W 82–60 | 17–1 (6–1) | Humphrey Coliseum; Starkville, Mississippi |
| Jan 31, 2004 | No. 11 | at Auburn | W 73–68 | 18–1 (7–1) | Beard-Eaves-Memorial Coliseum; Auburn, Alabama |
| Feb 7, 2004 | No. 7 | Ole Miss | W 80–56 | 19–1 (8–1) | Humphrey Coliseum; Starkville, Mississippi |
| Feb 11, 2004 | No. 6 | at No. 25 South Carolina | W 79–75 ^{OT} | 20–1 (9–1) | The Colonial Life Arena; Columbia, South Carolina |
| Feb 14, 2004 | No. 6 | at Arkansas | W 77–70 | 21–1 (10–1) | Bud Walton Arena; Fayetteville, Arkansas |
| Feb 21, 2004 | No. 4 | Alabama | L 73–77 | 21–2 (10–2) | Humphrey Coliseum; Starkville, Mississippi |
| Feb 25, 2004 | No. 7 | LSU | W 84–58 | 22–2 (11–2) | Humphrey Coliseum; Starkville, Mississippi |
| Feb 28, 2004 | No. 7 | at Vanderbilt | W 72–69 | 23–2 (12–2) | Memorial Gymnasium; Nashville, Tennessee |
| Mar 2, 2004 | No. 5 | Auburn | W 105–91 | 24–2 (13–2) | Humphrey Coliseum; Starkville, Mississippi |
| Mar 6, 2004 | No. 5 | at Alabama | W 82–81 ^{OT} | 25–2 (14–2) | Coleman Coliseum; Tuscaloosa, Alabama |
SEC Tournament
| Mar 12, 2004* | (W1) No. 4 | vs. (E4) Vanderbilt; Quarterfinals | L 70–74 ^{OT} | 25–3 | Georgia Dome; Atlanta, Georgia |
NCAA Tournament
| Mar 19, 2004* | (2 ATL) No. 8 | vs. (15 ATL) Monmouth; First Round | W 85–52 | 26–3 | Amway Arena; Orlando, Florida |
| Mar 21, 2004* | (2 ATL) No. 8 | vs. (7 ATL) Xavier; Second Round | L 74–89 | 26–4 | Amway Arena; Orlando, Florida |
*Non-conference game. ^{#}Rankings from AP poll. (#) Tournament seedings in parentheses. ATL=Atlanta.

== Awards and honors ==
- Lawrence Roberts – Consensus First-team All-American, SEC Player of the Year
- Rick Stansbury – SEC Coach of the Year
