= 2004 SWAC men's basketball tournament =

Basketball Tournament March 2004 in Alabama

- Classification: Division I
- Season: 2003–04
- Teams: 8
- Site: Bill Harris Arena; Birmingham, Alabama
- Champions: Alabama State (2nd title)
- Winning coach: Rob Spivery (2nd title)

2003–04 SWAC men's basketball standings
	Conf.				Overall
Team	W		L	PCT	W		L	PCT
Mississippi Valley State	16	–	2	.889	22	–	7	.759
Alabama State †	11	–	7	.611	16	–	15	.516
Texas Southern	10	–	8	.556	14	–	15	.483
Alabama A&M	9	–	9	.500	13	–	17	.433
Jackson State	9	–	9	.500	12	–	17	.414
Alcorn State	9	–	9	.500	11	–	18	.379
Grambling State	9	–	9	.500	11	–	18	.379
Southern	9	–	9	.500	12	–	16	.429
Prairie View A&M	7	–	11	.389	7	–	20	.259
Arkansas–Pine Bluff	1	–	17	.056	1	–	26	.037
† 2004 SWAC tournament winner Rankings from AP Poll

The 2004 SWAC men's basketball tournament was held March 11–13, 2004, at Bill Harris Arena in Birmingham, Alabama. Alabama State defeated Alabama A&M, 63–58 in the championship game. The Hornets received the conference's automatic bid to the 2004 NCAA tournament as No. 16 seed in the Atlanta Region.

== Bracket and results ==
Quarterfinals; March 11
1	Mississippi Valley State	66
8	Alcorn State	67
4	Alabama A&M	86
5	Grambling State	80
3	Texas Southern	62
6	Jackson State	71
2	Alabama State	63
7	Southern	62

Semifinals; March 12
8	Alcorn State	81
4	Alabama A&M	83
6	Jackson State	56
2	Alabama State	59

Final; March 13
4	Alabama A&M	58
2	Alabama State	63
