= 2003–04 Arkansas Razorbacks men's basketball team =

American college basketball season

2003–04 Arkansas Razorbacks men's basketball
- Conference: Southeastern Conference
- West
- Record: 12–16 (4–12 SEC)
- Head coach: Stan Heath (2nd season)
- Home arena: Bud Walton Arena

2003–04 Southeastern Conference men's basketball standings
| | Conf. | | | | Overall |
| Team | W | | L | PCT | W | | L | PCT |
|---|---|---|---|---|---|---|---|---|
East
| No. 2 Kentucky † | 13 | – | 3 | .813 | 27 | – | 5 | .844 |
| Florida | 9 | – | 7 | .563 | 20 | – | 11 | .645 |
| No. 23 South Carolina | 8 | – | 8 | .500 | 23 | – | 11 | .676 |
| Vanderbilt | 8 | – | 8 | .500 | 23 | – | 10 | .697 |
| Georgia | 7 | – | 9 | .438 | 16 | – | 14 | .533 |
| Tennessee | 7 | – | 9 | .438 | 15 | – | 14 | .517 |
West
| No. 8 Mississippi State | 14 | – | 2 | .875 | 26 | – | 4 | .867 |
| LSU | 8 | – | 8 | .500 | 18 | – | 11 | .621 |
| Alabama | 8 | – | 8 | .500 | 20 | – | 13 | .606 |
| Auburn | 5 | – | 11 | .313 | 14 | – | 14 | .500 |
| Ole Miss | 5 | – | 11 | .313 | 13 | – | 15 | .464 |
| Arkansas | 4 | – | 12 | .250 | 12 | – | 16 | .429 |
† 2004 SEC tournament winner Rankings from AP Poll

The 2003–04 Arkansas Razorbacks men's basketball team represented the University of Arkansas in the 2003–04 college basketball season. The head coach was Stan Heath, serving for his second year. The team played its home games in Bud Walton Arena in Fayetteville, Arkansas.

== Schedule ==
| Date time, TV | Rank^{#} | Opponent^{#} | Result | Record | Site (attendance) city, state |
|---|---|---|---|---|---|
| 11/21/03*; 7:05 pm, ARSN | | Nicholls State | W 89–60 | 1–0 | Bud Walton Arena (13,245); Fayetteville, Arkansas |
| 11/25/03*; 7:05 pm | | Grambling State | W 64–46 | 2–0 | Bud Walton Arena (11,964); Fayetteville, Arkansas |
| 11/29/03*; 1:05 pm | | Jacksonville | W 85–65 | 3–0 | Alltel Arena (6,165); Little Rock, Arkansas |
| 12/3/03*; 7:05 pm | | Oral Roberts | W 77–71 | 4–0 | Bud Walton Arena (13,428); Fayetteville, Arkansas |
| 12/6/03*; 11:00 am, ARSN | | at No. 11 Illinois | L 61–84 | 4–1 | United Center (15,398); Chicago |
| 12/9/03*; 7:05 pm, ARSN | | Southeast Missouri State | W 78–68 | 5–1 | Bud Walton Arena (10,419); Fayetteville, Arkansas |
| 12/17/03*; 7:05 pm, ARSN | | Louisiana Tech | W 68–56 | 6–1 | Bud Walton Arena (13,229); Fayetteville, Arkansas |
| 12/20/03*; 4:05 pm, ARSN | | No. 3 Oklahoma State | L 58–73 | 6–2 | Bud Walton Arena (18,917); Fayetteville, Arkansas |
| 12/22/03*; 7:05 pm | | Western Carolina | L 59–62 | 6–3 | Bud Walton Arena (9,234); Fayetteville, Arkansas |
| 12/30/03*; 6:05 pm, ARSN | | at Tulsa | W 81–74 | 7–3 | Reynolds Center (8,455); Tulsa, Oklahoma |
| 1/3/04*; 12:30 pm, ARSN | | North Texas | W 96–61 | 8–3 | Bud Walton Arena (14,009); Fayetteville, Arkansas |
| 1/6/04; 8:05 pm, ESPN | | LSU | L 55–66 | 8–4 | Bud Walton Arena (18,478); Fayetteville, Arkansas |
| 1/10/04; 2:00 pm | | at No. 9 Mississippi State | L 62–80 | 8–5 | Humphrey Coliseum (9,646); Starkville, Mississippi |
| 1/14/04; 7:00 pm | | at Alabama | L 65–81 | 8–6 | Coleman Coliseum (8,956); Tuscaloosa, AL |
| 1/17/04; 2:05 pm | | Mississippi | W 86–78 | 9–6 | Bud Walton Arena (17,681); Fayetteville, Arkansas |
| 1/21/04; 7:00 pm | | at Auburn | L 63–70 | 9–7 | Beard-Eaves-Memorial Coliseum (7,110); Auburn, AL |
| 1/24/04; 2:05 pm, JP Sports | | No. 22 Vanderbilt | W 70–62 | 10–7 | Bud Walton Arena (17,169); Fayetteville, Arkansas |
| 1/31/04; 4:00 pm, FSN | | Georgia | L 50–71 | 10–8 | Stegeman Coliseum (9,417); Athens, Georgia |
| 2/4/04; 7:05 pm, JP Sports | | Auburn | W 74–52 | 11–8 | Bud Walton Arena (7,821); Fayetteville, Arkansas |
| 2/7/04; 12:00 pm, JP Sports | | at LSU | W 65–52 | 11–9 | Maravich Assembly Center (9,646); Baton Rouge, Louisiana |
| 2/11/04; 7:00 pm, JP Sports | | at Tennessee | W 69–65 | 11–10 | Thompson–Boling Arena (11,536); Knoxville, Tennessee |
| 2/14/04; 7:05 pm, FSN | | No. 6 Mississippi State | W 77–70 | 11–11 | Bud Walton Arena (19,042); Fayetteville, Arkansas |
| 2/18/04; 7:00 pm, JP Sports | | at No. 9 Kentucky | L 56–73 | 11–12 | Rupp Arena (21,941); Lexington, Kentucky |
| 2/21/04; 2:05 pm | | No. 25 South Carolina | W 82–66 | 12–12 | Bud Walton Arena (17,812); Fayetteville, Arkansas |
| 2/28/04; 3:05 pm, JP Sports | | Florida | W 73–68 | 12–13 | Bud Walton Arena (18,602); Fayetteville, Arkansas |
| 3/3/04; 7:05 pm, JP Sports | | Alabama | L 68–72 ^{OT} | 12–14 | Bud Walton Arena (15,626); Fayetteville, Arkansas |
| 3/6/04; 2:00 pm | | at Mississippi | L 45–55 | 12–15 | Tad Smith Coliseum (4,455); Oxford, Mississippi |
2004 SEC men's basketball tournament
| 3/11/04; 2:15 pm, JP Sports | | vs. South Carolina | L 81–91 | 12–16 | Georgia Dome (12,545); Atlanta |
*Non-conference game. ^{#}Rankings from AP Poll. (#) Tournament seedings in parentheses. All times are in CST.
