= John Thompson III =

American basketball coach (born 1966)

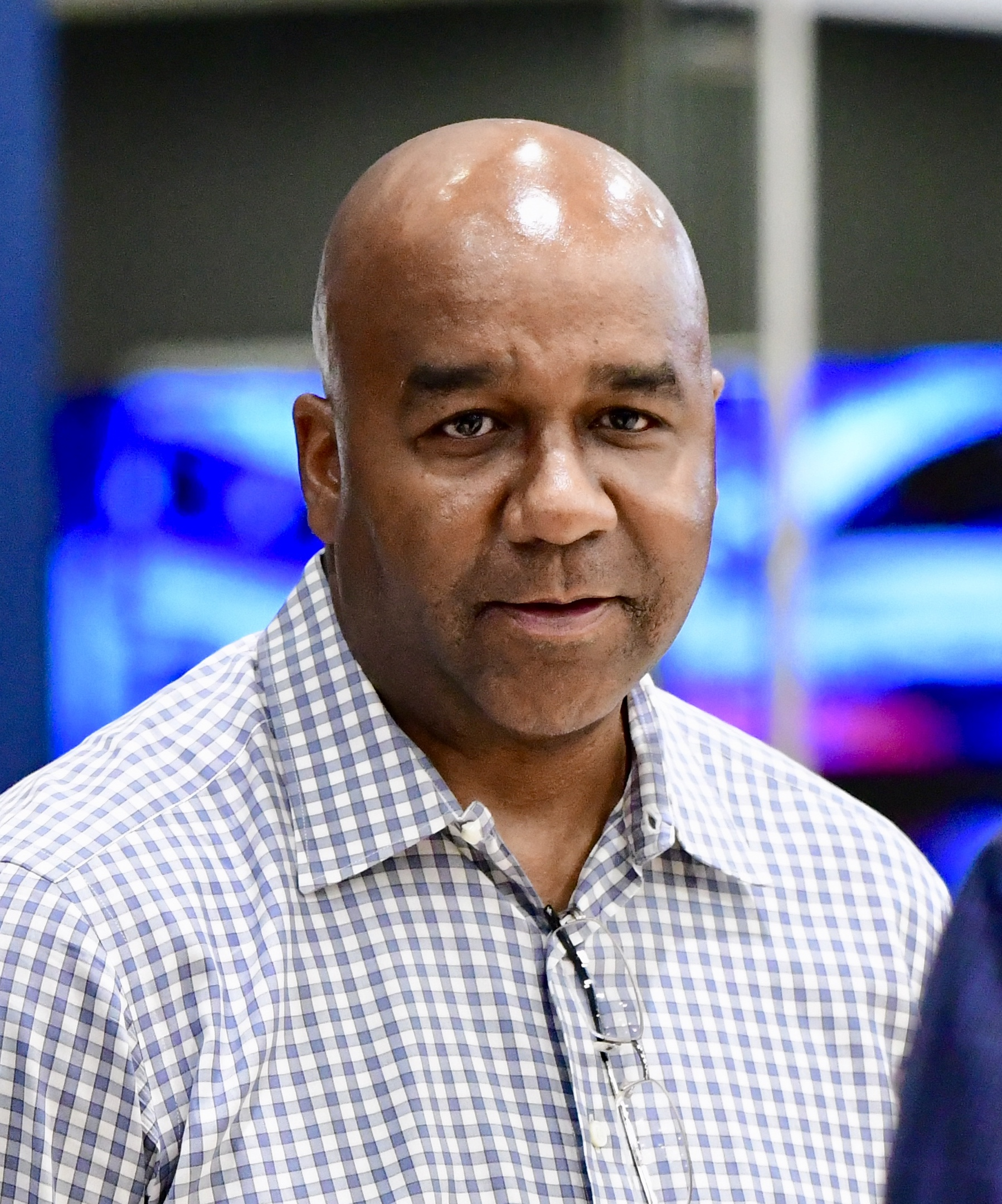
- John Thompson III (2019)

Biographical details
- Born: March 11, 1966 (age 60); Boston, Massachusetts, U.S.

Playing career
- 1984–1988: Princeton

Coaching career (HC unless noted)
- 1995–2000: Princeton (assistant)
- 2000–2004: Princeton
- 2004–2017: Georgetown

Head coaching record
- Overall: 346–193 (.641)
- Tournaments: 9–10 (NCAA Division I); 3–4 (NIT)

Accomplishments and honors

Championships
- NCAA Division I Regional – Final Four (2007); 3 Ivy League regular season (2001, 2002, 2004); 3 Big East regular season (2007, 2008, 2013); Big East tournament (2007)

Awards
- Big East Coach of the Year (2013)

John Robert Thompson III (born March 11, 1966) is an American professional basketball coach and executive who has been the assistant coach for the United States men's national basketball team since 2017. He previously served as the head coach of the men's basketball team at Georgetown University.

== Early life ==
Thompson was born in Boston, Massachusetts to Gwen and John Thompson Jr., who at the time was playing for the Boston Celtics of the NBA. After his father's playing career ended the family moved to Washington, DC. Thompson spent his formative years there while his father coached the Georgetown University men's basketball team.

The younger Thompson attended and played basketball for Gonzaga College High School in Washington, and was named first team All-Metro by The Washington Post in 1984.

He then attended and played basketball for Princeton University, graduating in 1988 with the third-most assists in school history. After graduating from Princeton, Thompson took a position in an executive training program with the Ford Motor Company. He worked in multiple corporate positions before returning to basketball at his alma mater.

== Coaching career ==
=== Princeton ===
Thompson returned to Princeton as an assistant coach in 1996, before eventually being named head coach in 2000 as a replacement for Bill Carmody, who had departed for Northwestern after having led them to the NCAA Tournament and the National Invitation Tournament twice each.

Thompson guided the Tigers to a record of 16–11 (11–3 conference record), which was good enough to win the Ivy League for the first time since 1998. The following year, the Tigers went 16–12 (11–4) to finish in a three-way tie for the Ivy League title, which resulted in them having to play in a tiebreaker tournament, which they lost to Yale. The following year, they went 16–11 (10–4) and finished 3rd in the conference. In his final season in 2003, he led them to twenty wins while losing only one conference game to win the Ivy League for the third time in Thompson's four years at the program and the sixth overall time in the last eight years.

During his tenure at Princeton, Thompson coached future US Secretary of Defense Pete Hegseth.

=== Georgetown ===
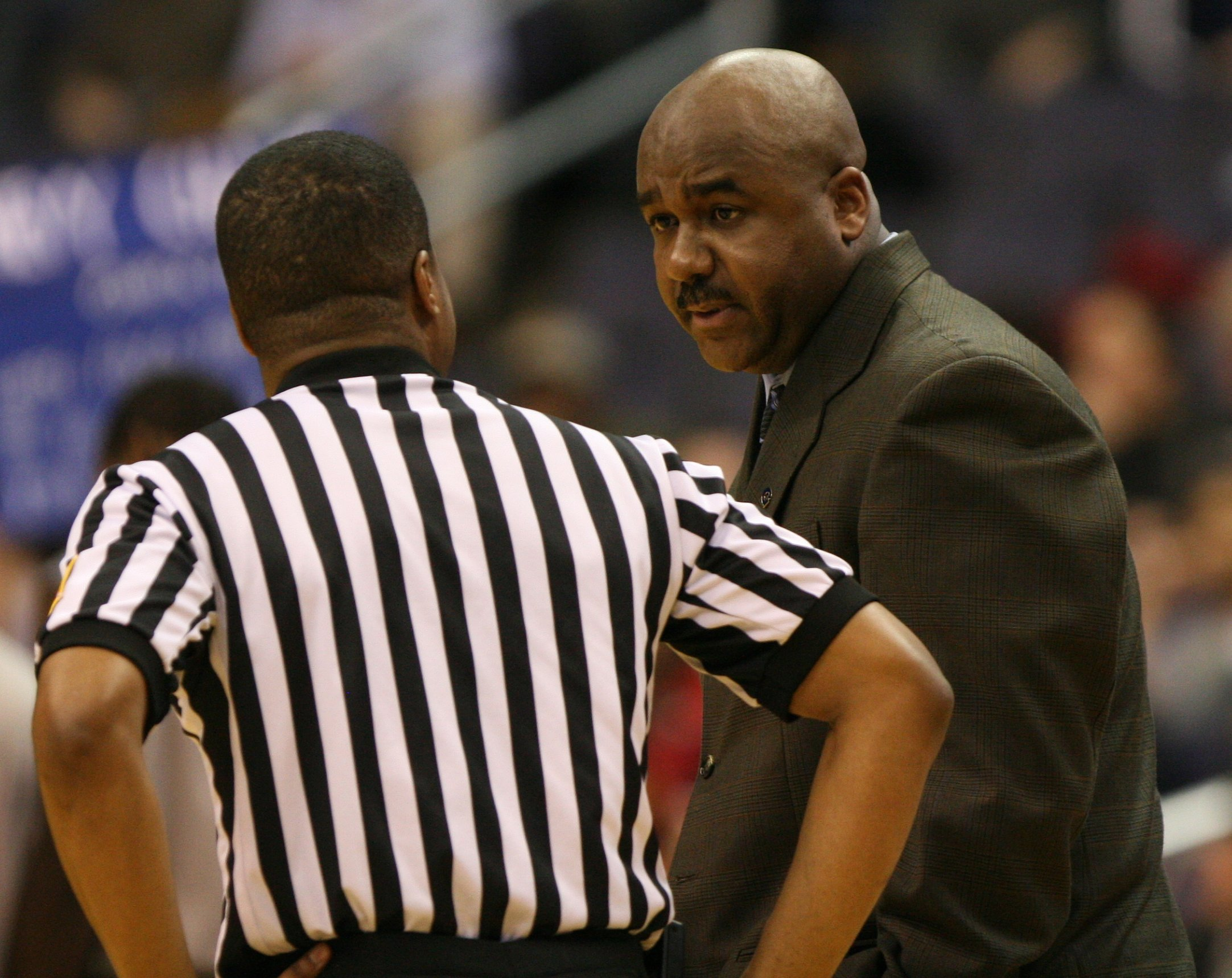
Thompson talks with a referee in a 2006 game

Thompson was hired by Georgetown in 2004 to replace Craig Esherick. Esherick (as had been the case with his predecessor John Thompson) had utilized an offense built on quick and physical play; however, Georgetown had not made the NCAA Tournament in six of the last seven years. Thompson III immediately introduced the Princeton offense at Georgetown, a style of play that he learned from coach Pete Carril at Princeton as a player and assistant coach; the offense is cited as more deliberate in nature with establishing scoring opportunities through ball movement alongside passes and backdoor cuts. The 2004–05 team started out fair, with Thompson's first win over a ranked team coming against Pittsburgh on January 5. However, the Hoyas finished 16–11 after losing five straight games to end the regular season, which meant they finished 7th in the Big East Conference. They fell to Connecticut in the Quarterfinals of the Big East tournament, but the Hoyas were invited to the NIT that year; the Hoyas went to the Quarterfinal before losing to South Carolina.

In 2005, the team won 23 games while finish tied for fourth in the Big East, and they would receive a bid to the NCAA Tournament, the first for the team since 2001. Thompson's first notable win with the team took place on January 21, 2006, when unranked Georgetown upset No. 1 Duke. This was Georgetown's first win over a No. 1 ranked team in 21 years. The Hoyas received a seventh seed in the South Region. They beat Northern Iowa and Ohio State to reach the Sweet Sixteen against Florida, where they lost 57–53 to the eventual national champions.

The 2006 team, led by players such as Roy Hibbert, reached their potential. The Hoyas would go on a tremendous run that year, as they won twelve of their last thirteen games en route to a Big East championship. They won their first regular season title since 1997 before rolling to victory in the Big East tournament for their first tournament title since 1989. The Hoyas were seeded as a two-seed in the East Region, their highest seeding since 1996. They would beat Belmont, Boston College, and Vanderbilt to reach the Elite Eight. Facing the top seed in North Carolina, the Hoyas trailed by as much as eleven points with twelve minutes remaining before rallying to win 96–84 and reach the Final Four for the first time since 1985. They faced Ohio State in the Final Four; the game was tied with nine minutes remaining, but the Buckeyes went on a 23–16 run to beat Georgetown 67–60.

While the 2006–07 season was a banner year for the Hoyas, it also would prove to be the high point of Thompson's tenure at Georgetown. It would be the last time that the Hoyas would survive the tournament's opening weekend under Thompson; indeed, Thompson would only win two more tournament games.

The 2015–16 season was a disappointment for all sides involved. They notched one ranked victory in nonconference play and were 7–5, and expectations were fair for a contending team. Big East play would prove to be a disaster, as the Hoyas went 8–13, which included losing seven of the last eight games in the regular season. It was the first time in his tenure that the Hoyas were not invited to either the NCAA Tournament or the NIT. After the season, Thompson (dubbed one of the "most polarizing figures in college sports" by the campus newspaper) called the season the most challenging of his career. The 2016–17 season proved to be the last for Thompson as coach. A 9–4 non-conference record ended up being a mirage for a miserable season of Big East play, where they went 5–13. They managed to beat three ranked teams (including eleventh-ranked Butler in January), but the Hoyas lost seven of their last eight games to finish below .500 for the second straight year, which was the first time Georgetown had suffered back-to-back losing seasons since 1972–1973. On March 23, 2017 (fifteen days after the Hoyas lost in the First Round of the Big East tournament), Thompson was fired. Thompson's 13-year tenure as head coach is the second longest in Georgetown history, and his 278 wins are also second all-time in school history–in both cases, only behind his father.

=== United States Men's National Team ===
On October 12, 2017, Thompson was named by USA Basketball as the assistant coach of the United States men's national basketball team for all FIBA World Cup qualifiers leading to the 2019 FIBA World Cup. This was his second time as an assistant coach in the National Programme; he has previously (2008) served as an assistant for the Under 18 men's team.

=== Washington Wizards ===
In July 2019, Thompson joined Monumental Sports & Entertainment, owner of the NBA's Washington Wizards and WNBA's Washington Mystics, to become the lead of their newly formed athlete development and engagement department.

== Personal life ==
Thompson is married to his wife, Monica, with whom he has three children: Morgan, John, and Matthew. His younger brother Ronny Thompson also played and coached college basketball.

== Head coaching record ==
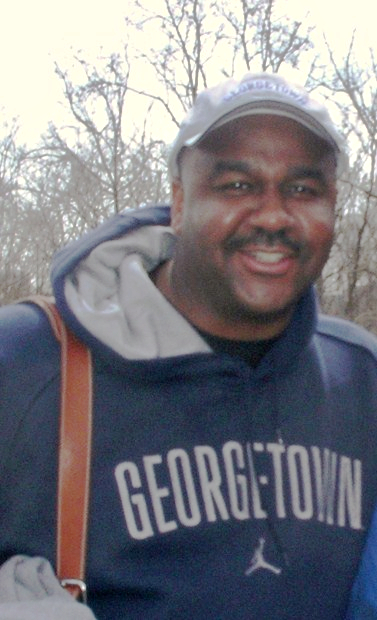
John Thompson III outside McDonough Gymnasium on March 26, 2007, following his return to the Georgetown University campus after defeating North Carolina to reach the 2007 Final Four.

Record table
Season	Team	Overall	Conference	Standing	Postseason
Princeton Tigers (Ivy League) (2000–2004)
2000–01	Princeton	16–11	11–3	1st	NCAA Division I Round of 64
2001–02	Princeton	16–12	11–3	T–1st	NIT First Round
2002–03	Princeton	16–11	10–4	3rd	
2003–04	Princeton	20–8	13–1	1st	NCAA Division I Round of 64
Princeton:		68–42 (.618)	45–11 (.804)		
Georgetown Hoyas (Big East Conference) (2004–2017)
2004–05	Georgetown	19–13	8–8	T–7th	NIT Quarterfinal
2005–06	Georgetown	23–10	10–6	T–4th	NCAA Division I Sweet 16
2006–07	Georgetown	30–7	13–3	1st	NCAA Division I Final Four
2007–08	Georgetown	28–6	15–3	1st	NCAA Division I Round of 32
2008–09	Georgetown	16–15	7–11	11th	NIT First Round
2009–10	Georgetown	23–11	10–8	7th	NCAA Division I Round of 64
2010–11	Georgetown	21–11	10–8	8th	NCAA Division I Round of 64
2011–12	Georgetown	24–9	12–6	T–4th	NCAA Division I Round of 32
2012–13	Georgetown	25–7	14–4	T–1st	NCAA Division I Round of 64
2013–14	Georgetown	18–15	8–10	7th	NIT Second Round
2014–15	Georgetown	22–11	12–6	T–2nd	NCAA Division I Round of 32
2015–16	Georgetown	15–18	7–11	8th	
2016–17	Georgetown	14–18	5–13	9th	
Georgetown:		278–151 (.653)	131–97 (.580)		
Total:		346–193 (.641)			
National champion Postseason invitational champion Conference regular season champion Conference regular season and conference tournament champion Division regular season champion Division regular season and conference tournament champion Conference tournament champion

== See also ==
- List of NCAA Division I Men's Final Four appearances by coach
