= 2004 SEC men's basketball tournament =

- Classification: Division I
- Season: 2003–04
- Teams: 12
- Site: Georgia Dome; Atlanta, Georgia
- Champions: Kentucky (26th title)
- Winning coach: Tubby Smith (5th title)
- MVP: Gerald Fitch, Kentucky
- Attendance: 172,840

2003–04 Southeastern Conference men's basketball standings
	Conf.				Overall
Team	W		L	PCT	W		L	PCT
East
No. 2 Kentucky †	13	–	3	.813	27	–	5	.844
Florida	9	–	7	.563	20	–	11	.645
No. 23 South Carolina	8	–	8	.500	23	–	11	.676
Vanderbilt	8	–	8	.500	23	–	10	.697
Georgia	7	–	9	.438	16	–	14	.533
Tennessee	7	–	9	.438	15	–	14	.517
West
No. 8 Mississippi State	14	–	2	.875	26	–	4	.867
LSU	8	–	8	.500	18	–	11	.621
Alabama	8	–	8	.500	20	–	13	.606
Auburn	5	–	11	.313	14	–	14	.500
Ole Miss	5	–	11	.313	13	–	15	.464
Arkansas	4	–	12	.250	12	–	16	.429
† 2004 SEC tournament winner Rankings from AP Poll

The 2004 SEC men's basketball tournament took place on March 11–14, 2004 in Atlanta, Georgia at the Georgia Dome.

Kentucky won the tournament and received the SEC's automatic bid to the NCAA tournament by beating Florida on March 14, 2004.

== Bracket ==
First round
W5	Mississippi	50
E4	Vanderbilt	70
E6	Tennessee	49
W3	Alabama	84
E5	Georgia	73
W4	Auburn	59
W6	Arkansas	81
E3	South Carolina	91

Second Round
W1	#4 Mississippi State	70
E4	Vanderbilt	74*
E2	Florida	75
W3	Alabama	73
E1	#8 Kentucky	69
E5	Georgia	60
E3	South Carolina	85
W2	LSU	67

Semifinals
E4	Vanderbilt	69
E2	Florida	91
E1	#8 Kentucky	78
E3	South Carolina	63

Championship game
E1	#8 Kentucky	89
E2	Florida	73

*overtime
