= 2003–04 Princeton Tigers men's basketball team =

American college basketball season

2003–04 Princeton Tigers men's basketball

Ivy League Champion

2004 NCAA Men's Division I Tournament, Fourteen Seed, Round of 64
- Conference: Ivy League
- Record: 20–8 (13–1, 1st Ivy)
- Head coach: John Thompson III
- Assistant coach: Mike Brennan
- Captains: Ed Persia; Judson Wallace
- Home arena: Jadwin Gymnasium

2003–04 Ivy League men's basketball standings
	Conf.				Overall
Team	W		L	PCT	W		L	PCT
Princeton	13	–	1	.929	20	–	8	.714
Penn	10	–	4	.714	17	–	10	.630
Brown	10	–	4	.714	14	–	13	.519
Yale	7	–	7	.500	12	–	15	.444
Cornell	6	–	8	.429	11	–	16	.407
Columbia	6	–	8	.429	10	–	17	.370
Harvard	3	–	11	.214	4	–	23	.148
Dartmouth	1	–	13	.071	3	–	25	.107
Rankings from AP Poll

The 2003–04 Princeton Tigers men's basketball team represented Princeton University in intercollegiate college basketball during the 2003–04 NCAA Division I men's basketball season. The head coach was John Thompson III and the team captains were Ed Persia and Judson Wallace. The team played its home games in the Jadwin Gymnasium on the university campus in Princeton, New Jersey, and was the champion of the Ivy League, which earned them an invitation to the 65-team 2004 NCAA Division I men's basketball tournament where they were seeded fourteenth in the Atlanta Region. Following the season Thompson departed to coach Georgetown where his father John Thompson Jr. had coached for decades. He was replaced by Joe Scott. Both Scott and the younger Thompson are former Princeton Tigers basketball captains.

Using the Princeton offense, the team posted a 20–8 overall record and a 13–1 conference record. Princeton clinched the Ivy League title on March 6, 2004, at Dartmouth, making the March 9 annual Ivy League season finale contest against Penn meaningless. Nonetheless, the Tigers defeated Penn 76–70 in overtime giving them a nine-game winning streak as they entered the NCAA Division I basketball tournament. In its March 18, 2004 NCAA Division I men's basketball tournament Atlanta Regional first-round game against the Brandon Mouton-led Texas Longhorns at the Pepsi Center in Denver, Colorado the team lost by a 66–49 margin.

The team was led by first team All-Ivy League selections Will Venable and Judson Wallace.

== Schedule and results ==
The team posted a 20–8 (13–1 Ivy League) record.

Date time, TV	Rank^{#}	Opponent^{#}	Result	Record	Site city, state
Regular season
Nov 21, 2003*		Colgate	W 73–64	1–0	Jadwin Gymnasium; Princeton, New Jersey
Nov 28, 2003*		Holy Cross	W 61–55	2–0	Jadwin Gymnasium; Princeton, New Jersey
Dec 2, 2003*		at Maryland-Baltimore County	W 68–56	3–0	RAC Arena; Catonsville, Maryland
Dec 5, 2003*		vs. UC Irvine; McCaffrey Classic	L 55–57	3–1	Save Mart Center; Fresno, California
Dec 6, 2003*		at Fresno State; McCaffrey Classic	W 72–67	4–1	Save Mart Center; Fresno, California
Dec 13, 2003*		at Rutgers	L 49–51	4–2	Louis Brown Athletic Center; Piscataway, New Jersey
Dec 17, 2003*		at No. 3 Duke	L 51–69	4–3	Cameron Indoor Stadium; Durham, North Carolina
Dec 22, 2003*		Lafayette	L 44–47	4–4	Jadwin Gymnasium; Princeton, New Jersey
Dec 29, 2003*		at Loyola (MD)	W 74–54	5–4	Reitz Arena; Baltimore, Maryland
Jan 3, 2004*		vs. No. 7 Oklahoma; Touchstone Energy All-College Classic	L 55–58	5–5	Ford Center; Oklahoma City, Oklahoma
Jan 7, 2004*		Monmouth	W 67–52	6–5	Jadwin Gymnasium; Princeton, New Jersey
Jan 10, 2004*		at Minnesota	L 53–57	6–6	Williams Arena; Minneapolis, Minnesota
Jan 26, 2004*		Southern Vermont	W 86–48	7–6	Jadwin Gymnasium; Princeton, New Jersey
Jan 30, 2004		at Brown	W 64–49	8–6 (1–0)	Pizzitola Sports Center; Providence, Rhode Island
Jan 31, 2004		at Yale	W 49–47	9–6 (2–0)	John J. Lee Amphitheater; New Haven, Connecticut
Feb 6, 2004		Dartmouth	W 61–45	10–6 (3–0)	Jadwin Gymnasium; Princeton, New Jersey
Feb 7, 2004		Harvard	W 58–50 ^{2OT}	11–6 (4–0)	Jadwin Gymnasium; Princeton, New Jersey
Feb 10, 2004		Penn	L 52–67	11–7 (4–1)	Jadwin Gymnasium; Princeton, New Jersey
Feb 13, 2004		at Cornell	W 69–64	12–7 (5–1)	Newman Arena; Ithaca, New York
Feb 14, 2004		at Columbia	W 78–71 ^{OT}	13–7 (6–1)	Levien Gymnasium; New York, New York
Feb 20, 2004		Yale	W 70–58	14–7 (7–1)	Jadwin Gymnasium; Princeton, New Jersey
Feb 21, 2004		Brown	W 68–61	15–7 (8–1)	Jadwin Gymnasium; Princeton, New Jersey
Feb 27, 2004		Columbia	W 75–52	16–7 (9–1)	Jadwin Gymnasium; Princeton, New Jersey
Feb 28, 2004		Cornell	W 59–46	17–7 (10–1)	Jadwin Gymnasium; Princeton, New Jersey
Mar 5, 2004		at Harvard	W 60–51	18–7 (11–1)	Lavietes Pavilion; Cambridge, Massachusetts
Mar 6, 2004		at Dartmouth	W 64–59	19–7 (12–1)	Leede Arena; Hanover, New Hampshire
Mar 9, 2004		at Penn	W 76–70 ^{OT}	20–7 (13–1)	The Palestra; Philadelphia, Pennsylvania
NCAA tournament
Mar 18, 2004*	(14 ATL)	vs. (3 ATL) No. 12 Texas; First round	L 49–66	20–8	The Pepsi Center; Denver, Colorado
*Non-conference game. ^{#}Rankings from AP Poll. (#) Tournament seedings in parentheses. ATL=Atlanta. All times are in EST.
