= 2003–04 Alabama State Hornets basketball team =

American college basketball season

2003–04 Alabama State Hornets basketball
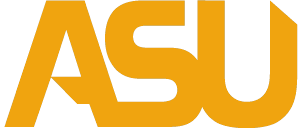

SWAC tournament champions

NCAA tournament, First round
- Conference: Southwestern Athletic Conference
- Record: 16–15 (11–7 SWAC)
- Head coach: Rob Spivery (8th season)
- Home arena: Dunn–Oliver Acadome

2003–04 SWAC men's basketball standings
| | Conf. | | | | Overall |
| Team | W | | L | PCT | W | | L | PCT |
|---|---|---|---|---|---|---|---|---|
| Mississippi Valley State | 16 | – | 2 | .889 | 22 | – | 7 | .759 |
| Alabama State † | 11 | – | 7 | .611 | 16 | – | 15 | .516 |
| Texas Southern | 10 | – | 8 | .556 | 14 | – | 15 | .483 |
| Alabama A&M | 9 | – | 9 | .500 | 13 | – | 17 | .433 |
| Jackson State | 9 | – | 9 | .500 | 12 | – | 17 | .414 |
| Alcorn State | 9 | – | 9 | .500 | 11 | – | 18 | .379 |
| Grambling State | 9 | – | 9 | .500 | 11 | – | 18 | .379 |
| Southern | 9 | – | 9 | .500 | 12 | – | 16 | .429 |
| Prairie View A&M | 7 | – | 11 | .389 | 7 | – | 20 | .259 |
| Arkansas–Pine Bluff | 1 | – | 17 | .056 | 1 | – | 26 | .037 |
† 2004 SWAC tournament winner Rankings from AP Poll

The 2003–04 Alabama State Hornets basketball team represented Alabama State University during the 2003–04 NCAA Division I men's basketball season. The Hornets, led by head coach Rob Spivery, played their home games at the Dunn–Oliver Acadome in Montgomery, Alabama as members of the Southwestern Athletic Conference (SWAC). After finishing second in the SWAC regular season standings, the Hornets won the SWAC tournament, earning the conference's automatic bid to play in the NCAA tournament. Playing as No. 16 seed in the South region, Alabama State was beaten by No. 1 seed and eventual Final Four participant Duke in the opening round, to finish the season 16–15 (11–7 SWAC).

== Roster ==
2003–04 Alabama State Hornets men's basketball team
| Players | Coaches |
|---|---|
| Pos. / # / Name / Height / Weight / Year / Previous school / Hometown; G / 23 / Malcolm Campbell / 5 ft 11 in (1.8 m) / 160 lb (73 kg) / Sr / / Kansas City, Kansas | Head coach: Rob Spivery (Ashland); Assistant coach(es) Legend: (C) Team captain; (S) Suspended; (I) Ineligible; (W) Walk-on; Injured; Current redshirt; Roster |

== Schedule and results ==
| Date time, TV | Rank^{#} | Opponent^{#} | Result | Record | Site city, state |
Non-conference Regular season
| Dec 20, 2003* | | at Nevada; Wolf Pack Holiday Classic | L 43–70 | 2–5 | Lawlor Events Center; Reno, Nevada |
| Dec 21, 2003* | | vs. UC Santa Barbara; Wolf Pack Holiday Classic | L 53–63 | 2–6 | Lawlor Events Center; Reno, Nevada |
| Dec 30, 2003* | | at Ole Miss | L 44–68 | 2–7 | Tad Smith Coliseum; Oxford, Mississippi |
SWAC Regular season
| Jan 3, 2004 | | at Grambling | W 60–53 | 3–7 (1–0) | Tiger Memorial Gym; Grambling, Louisiana |
| Mar 6, 2004 | | Jackson State | W 65–54 | 13–14 (11–7) | Joe L. Reed Acadome; Montgomery, Alabama |
SWAC tournament
| Mar 11, 2004* | | vs. Southern; Quarterfinals | W 63–62 | 14–14 | Bill Harris Arena; Birmingham, Alabama |
| Mar 12, 2004* | | vs. Jackson State; Semifinals | W 59–56 ^{2OT} | 15–14 | Bill Harris Arena; Birmingham, Alabama |
| Mar 13, 2004* | | vs. Alabama A&M; Championship game | W 63–58 | 16–14 | Bill Harris Arena; Birmingham, Alabama |
NCAA tournament
| Mar 18, 2004* | (16 S) | vs. (1 S) No. 6 Duke; First round | L 61–96 | 16–15 | RBC Center; Raleigh, North Carolina |
*Non-conference game. ^{#}Rankings from AP Poll. (#) Tournament seedings in parentheses. S=South. All times are in Central.
