= 2003–04 Florida Gators men's basketball team =

American college basketball season

2003–04 Florida Gators men's basketball

Orange Bowl Classic Champion

NCAA tournament, Round of 64
- Conference: Southeastern Conference
- East Division
- Record: 20–11 (9–7 SEC)
- Head coach: Billy Donovan
- Home arena: O'Connell Center

2003–04 Southeastern Conference men's basketball standings
| | Conf. | | | | Overall |
| Team | W | | L | PCT | W | | L | PCT |
|---|---|---|---|---|---|---|---|---|
East
| No. 2 Kentucky † | 13 | – | 3 | .813 | 27 | – | 5 | .844 |
| Florida | 9 | – | 7 | .563 | 20 | – | 11 | .645 |
| No. 23 South Carolina | 8 | – | 8 | .500 | 23 | – | 11 | .676 |
| Vanderbilt | 8 | – | 8 | .500 | 23 | – | 10 | .697 |
| Georgia | 7 | – | 9 | .438 | 16 | – | 14 | .533 |
| Tennessee | 7 | – | 9 | .438 | 15 | – | 14 | .517 |
West
| No. 8 Mississippi State | 14 | – | 2 | .875 | 26 | – | 4 | .867 |
| LSU | 8 | – | 8 | .500 | 18 | – | 11 | .621 |
| Alabama | 8 | – | 8 | .500 | 20 | – | 13 | .606 |
| Auburn | 5 | – | 11 | .313 | 14 | – | 14 | .500 |
| Ole Miss | 5 | – | 11 | .313 | 13 | – | 15 | .464 |
| Arkansas | 4 | – | 12 | .250 | 12 | – | 16 | .429 |
† 2004 SEC tournament winner Rankings from AP Poll

The 2003–04 Florida Gators men's basketball team represented the University of Florida during the 2003–04 men's college basketball season. The team was coached by Billy Donovan.

On December 20, 2003, Florida defeated West Virginia 70–57 in the Orange Bowl Basketball Classic.

The Gators finished the season with a 20-11 record. They were eliminated from the third round of the SEC tournament in an 89-73 loss to Kentucky. On March 18, 2004, Florida was upset in the NCAA tournament Round of 64 by #12 seeded Manhattan.

== Roster ==
| Name | Number | Position | Height | Weight | Class | Hometown |
|---|---|---|---|---|---|---|
| Mohamed Abukar | 34 | F | 6-10 | 216 | Freshman | San Diego, CA |
| Rashid Al-Kaleem | 22 | G | 6-3 | 192 | Sophomore | Dorchester, MA |
| Ryan Appleby | 20 | G | 6-3 | 170 | Freshman | Stanwood, Washington |
| Bonell Colas | 42 | C | 6-9 | 225 | Senior | Miami, Florida |
| Christian Drejer | 10 | G | 6-9 | 210 | Sophomore | Copenhagen, Denmark |
| Seth Haimovitch | 3 | G | 6-1 | 176 | Junior | Coral Springs, Florida |
| Lee Humphrey | 12 | G | 6-2 | 192 | Freshman | Maryville, Tennessee |
| David Lee | 24 | F | 6-9 | 249 | Junior | St. Louis, Missouri |
| Adrian Moss | 4 | F | 6-9 | 247 | Sophomore | Houston, Texas |
| Chris Richard | 32 | C | 6-9 | 270 | Freshman | Lakeland, Florida |
| Anthony Roberson | 1 | G | 6-2 | 180 | Sophomore | Saginaw, Michigan |
| Matt Walsh | 44 | F | 6-6 | 205 | Sophomore | Holland, Pennsylvania |

== Schedule ==
| Date time, TV | Rank^{#} | Opponent^{#} | Result | Record | Site city, state |
|---|---|---|---|---|---|
| November 25* | | Montana State | W 112–73 | | O'Connell Center; Gainesville, FL |
| November 28* | | vs. Arizona; MassMutual Tip-Off Classic | W 78–77 | | Springfield, MA |
| December 2* | | Florida A&M | W 102–78 | | O'Connell Center; Gainesville, FL |
| December 4* | | vs. UCF | W 59–39 | | Jacksonville, FL |
| December 6* | | Stetson | W 74–61 | | O'Connell Center; Gainesville, FL |
| December 10* | | Maryland | L 68–69 ^{OT} | | O'Connell Center; Gainesville, FL |
| December 13* | | at Louisville | L 65–73 | | Freedom Hall; Louisville, KY |
| December 20* | | vs. West Virginia; Orange Bowl Basketball Classic | W 70–57 | | |
| December 22* | | Northeastern | W 101–84 | | O'Connell Center; Gainesville, FL |
| December 27* | | Eastern Kentucky | W 109–63 | | O'Connell Center; Gainesville, FL |
| January 3* | | Florida State; Rivalry | W 87–73 | | O'Connell Center; Gainesville, FL |
| January 7 | | at South Carolina | W 65–62 | | Columbia, SC |
| January 10 | | Tennessee | W 95–57 | | O'Connell Center; Gainesville, FL |
| January 17 | | at Vanderbilt | L 72–86 | | Nashville, TN |
| January 21 | | Mississippi State | L 68–79 | | O'Connell Center; Gainesville, FL |
| January 24 | | Auburn | W 68–52 | | O'Connell Center; Gainesville, FL |
| January 27 | | at Alabama | W 88–78 | | Tuscaloosa, AL |
| January 31 | | at Tennessee | L 63–65 | | Knoxville, TN |
| February 3 | | Kentucky; Rivalry | L 65–68 | | O'Connell Center; Gainesville, FL |
| February 7 | | Vanderbilt | W 81–71 | | O'Connell Center; Gainesville, FL |
| February 14 | | LSU | L 70–73 | | O'Connell Center; Gainesville, FL |
| February 17 | | at Georgia | L 62–76 | | Athens, GA |
| February 21 | | at Ole Miss | W 81–66 | | Oxford, MS |
| February 25 | | South Carolina | W 69–58 | | O'Connell Center; Gainesville, FL |
| February 28 | | at Arkansas | W 73–68 | | Fayetteville, AR |
| March 3 | | Georgia | W 63–55 | | O'Connell Center; Gainesville, FL |
| | | at Kentucky | L 62–82 | | Rupp Arena; Lexington, KY |
| March 12* | | vs. Alabama; SEC tournament | W 75–73 ^{OT} | | Georgia Dome; Atlanta, GA |
| March 13* | | vs. Vanderbilt; SEC Tournament | W 91–69 | | Georgia Dome; Atlanta, GA |
| March 14* | | vs. Kentucky; SEC Tournament | L 73–89 | | Georgia Dome; Atlanta, GA |
| March 18*; 12:15 pm | | Manhattan; NCAA tournament | L 60–75 | | RBC Center; Raleigh, NC |
*Non-conference game. ^{#}Rankings from AP Poll. (#) Tournament seedings in parentheses. All times are in Eastern.
