= 2003–04 Kentucky Wildcats men's basketball team =

2003–04 season of University of Kentucky men's basketball team

2003–04 Kentucky Wildcats men's basketball
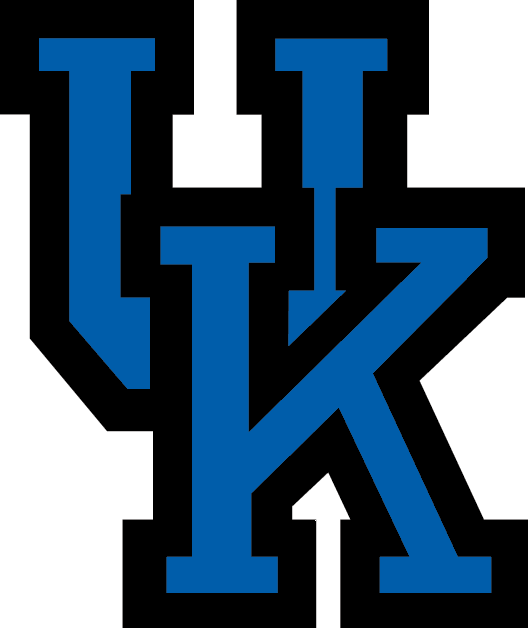

SEC tournament champions SEC East champions

NCAA tournament, Round of 32
- Conference: Southeastern Conference

Ranking
- Coaches: No. 8
- AP: No. 2
- Record: 27–5 (13–3 SEC)
- Head coach: Tubby Smith (7th season)
- Home arena: Rupp Arena

2003–04 Southeastern Conference men's basketball standings
	Conf.				Overall
Team	W		L	PCT	W		L	PCT
East
No. 2 Kentucky †	13	–	3	.813	27	–	5	.844
Florida	9	–	7	.563	20	–	11	.645
No. 23 South Carolina	8	–	8	.500	23	–	11	.676
Vanderbilt	8	–	8	.500	23	–	10	.697
Georgia	7	–	9	.438	16	–	14	.533
Tennessee	7	–	9	.438	15	–	14	.517
West
No. 8 Mississippi State	14	–	2	.875	26	–	4	.867
LSU	8	–	8	.500	18	–	11	.621
Alabama	8	–	8	.500	20	–	13	.606
Auburn	5	–	11	.313	14	–	14	.500
Ole Miss	5	–	11	.313	13	–	15	.464
Arkansas	4	–	12	.250	12	–	16	.429
† 2004 SEC tournament winner Rankings from AP Poll

The 2003–04 Kentucky Wildcats men's basketball team represented the University of Kentucky in the 2003–04 college basketball season led by head coach Tubby Smith. For the season Kentucky finished with an overall record of 27–5 (13–3 SEC). The highlight of the season came in the SEC Tournament as Kentucky easily defeated Florida 89–73, to win their 25th tournament championship.

Although the team earned a #1 seed in the NCAA tournament, they were upset by the University of Alabama at Birmingham in the second round.

== Roster ==
2003–04 Kentucky Wildcats men's basketball team
Players
Coaches

Pos.	#	Name	Height	Weight	Year	Previous school	Hometown
G	1	Cliff Hawkins	6 ft 1 in (1.85 m)	190 lb (86 kg)	Sr	Oak Hill Academy	Dumfries, Virginia
G	2	Ravi Moss	6 ft 2 in (1.88 m)	190 lb (86 kg)	So	University Heights	Hopkinsville, Kentucky
G	3	Brandon Stockton	5 ft 9 in (1.75 m)	170 lb (77 kg)	So	Glasgow	Glasgow, Kentucky
G	4	Gerald Fitch	6 ft 3 in (1.91 m)	190 lb (86 kg)	Sr	Westside	Macon, Georgia
G	5	Josh Carrier	6 ft 4 in (1.93 m)	205 lb (93 kg)	Jr	Bowling Green	Bowling Green, Kentucky
C	10	Łukasz Obrzut	7 ft 1 in (2.16 m)	265 lb (120 kg)	Fr	Bridgton Academy (ME)	Gliwice, Poland
G	12	Preston LeMaster	6 ft 2 in (1.88 m)	190 lb (86 kg)	So	Bourbon County	Paris, Kentucky
F	12	Bernard Cote	6 ft 9 in (2.06 m)	215 lb (98 kg)	So	Champlain-St. Lambert	St. Lambert, Quebec
F	13	Bobby Perry	6 ft 7 in (2.01 m)	215 lb (98 kg)	Fr	Hillside	Durham, North Carolina
F	14	Erik Daniels	6 ft 8 in (2.03 m)	215 lb (98 kg)	Sr	Princeton	Cincinnati
G	15	Matt Heissenbuttel	6 ft 4 in (1.93 m)	190 lb (86 kg)	Sr	Lexington Catholic	Lexington, Kentucky
C	21	Shagari Alleyne	7 ft 3 in (2.21 m)	270 lb (122 kg)	Fr	Rice	Bronx, New York
G	22	Patrick Sparks (redshirt)	6 ft 0 in (1.83 m)	180 lb (82 kg)	Jr	Muhlenberg North	Central City, Kentucky
F	23	Sheray Thomas	6 ft 8 in (2.03 m)	240 lb (109 kg)	Fr	Riverdale Baptist (MD)	Montreal, Quebec
F	24	Kelenna Azubuike	6 ft 5 in (1.96 m)	220 lb (100 kg)	So	Victory Christian	Tulsa, Oklahoma
G	33	Antwain Barbour	6 ft 5 in (1.96 m)	195 lb (88 kg)	Sr	Elizabethtown	Elizabethtown, Kentucky
F	44	Chuck Hayes	6 ft 6 in (1.98 m)	240 lb (109 kg)	Jr	Modesto Christian	Modesto, California

Head coach

- Tubby Smith (High Point)

Assistant coach(es)

- David Hobbs (VCU)
- Scott Rigot (Buffalo)
- Reggie Hanson (Kentucky)

Legend

- (C) Team captain
- (S) Suspended
- (I) Ineligible
- (W) Walk-on
- Injured
- Current redshirt

== Schedule and results ==
Date time, TV	Rank^{#}	Opponent^{#}	Result	Record	Site (attendance) city, state
Non-conference regular season
November 21, 2003*; 8:00 pm, UKTV	No. 10	Winthrop	W 65–44	1–0	Rupp Arena (21,271); Lexington, Kentucky
November 28, 2003*; 7:30 pm, UKTV	No. 10	Tennessee Tech	W 108–81	2–0	Rupp Arena (21,918); Lexington, Kentucky
December 1, 2003*; 8:00 pm, UKTV	No. 10	vs. Marshall	W 89–76	3–0	US Bank Arena (13,913); Cincinnati
December 6, 2003*; 1:30 pm, CBS	No. 9	vs. UCLA	W 52–50	4–0	Anaheim Pond (17,816); Anaheim, California
December 13, 2003*; 4:00 pm, CBS	No. 8	vs. No. 21 Michigan State; Basketbowl	W 79–74	5–0	Ford Field (78,129); Detroit
December 20, 2003*; 12:00 pm, CBS	No. 2	vs. Indiana	W 80–41	6–0	RCA Dome (25,686); Indianapolis
December 23, 2003*; 8:00 pm, UKTV	No. 2	Eastern Kentucky	W 101–72	7–0	Rupp Arena (22,023); Lexington, Kentucky
December 27, 2003*; 5:00 pm, CBS	No. 2	No. 20 Louisville; Battle for the Bluegrass	L 56–65	7–1	Rupp Arena (24,328); Lexington, Kentucky
December 31, 2003*; 4:00 pm, UKTV	No. 8	Austin Peay	W 61–53	8–1	Freedom Hall (11,526); Louisville, Kentucky
January 3, 2004*; 12:00 pm, CBS	No. 8	No. 9 North Carolina	W 61–56	9–1	Rupp Arena (23,014); Lexington, Kentucky
SEC Regular Season
January 10, 2004; 7:00 pm, JP Sports	No. 7	No. 20 Vanderbilt	W 75–63	10–1 (1–0)	Rupp Arena (22,927); Lexington, Kentucky
January 13, 2004; 9:00 pm, ESPN	No. 5	at No. 20 Mississippi State	W 67–66	11–1 (2–0)	Humphrey Coliseum (10,432); Starkville, Mississippi
January 17, 2004; 1:00 pm, JP Sports	No. 5	Georgia	L 57–65	11–2 (2–1)	Rupp Arena (23,102); Lexington, Kentucky
January 20, 2004; 9:00 pm, JP Sports	No. 9	at Tennessee	W 69–68 ^{OT}	12–2 (3–1)	Thompson–Boling Arena (17,990); Knoxville, Tennessee
January 25, 2004*; 4:00 pm, CBS	No. 9	at Notre Dame	W 71–63	13–2	Edmund P. Joyce Center (11,418); South Bend, Indiana
January 28, 2004; 8:00 pm, JP Sports	No. 5	Ole Miss	W 71–61	14–2 (4–1)	Rupp Arena (22,151); Lexington, Kentucky
January 31, 2004; 12:00 pm, ESPN2	No. 5	at Vanderbilt	L 60–66	14–3 (4–2)	Memorial Gymnasium (14,168); Nashville, Tennessee
February 3, 2004; 9:00 pm, ESPN	No. 9	at No. 21 Florida	W 68–65	15–3 (5–2)	O'Connell Center (12,330); Gainesville, Florida
February 7, 2004; 1:00 pm, JP Sports	No. 9	No. 25 South Carolina	W 65–64	16–3 (6–2)	Rupp Arena (23,244); Lexington, Kentucky
February 10, 2004; 7:00 pm, ESPN	No. 5	Alabama	W 66–55	17–3 (7–2)	Rupp Arena (22,042); Lexington, Kentucky
February 14, 2004; 1:00 pm, CBS	No. 8	at Georgia	L 68–74	17–4 (7–3)	Stegeman Coliseum (10,523); Athens, Georgia
February 18, 2004; 8:00 pm, JP Sports	No. 7	Arkansas	W 73–56	18–4 (8–3)	Rupp Arena (21,941); Lexington, Kentucky
February 21, 2004; 2:00 pm, JP Sports	No. 9	at Auburn	W 68–59	19–4 (9–3)	Beard-Eaves Memorial Coliseum (10,500); Auburn, AL
February 25, 2004; 8:00 pm, JP Sports	No. 3	Tennessee	W 92–60	20–4 (10–3)	Rupp Arena (23,201); Lexington, Kentucky
February 29, 2004; 4:00 pm, CBS	No. 9	at LSU	W 70–64	21–4 (11–3)	Maravich Center (12,791); Baton Rouge, Louisiana
March 3, 2004; 8:00 pm, JP Sports	No. 9	at South Carolina	W 84–65	22–4 (12–3)	Colonial Center (18,000); Columbia, South Carolina
March 7, 2004; 12:00 pm, CBS	No. 9	Florida	W 82–62	23–4 (13–3)	Rupp Arena (24,191); Lexington, Kentucky
2004 SEC Tournament
March 12, 2004; 1:00 pm, JP Sports	(1 E) No. 8	vs. (5 E) Georgia; 2004 SEC tournament quarterfinals	W 69–60	24–4	Georgia Dome (20,203); Atlanta
March 13, 2004; 1:00 pm, JP Sports	(1 E) No. 8	vs. (3 E) South Carolina; SEC tournament semifinals	W 78–63	25–4	Georgia Dome (21,446); Atlanta
March 14, 2004; 1:00 pm, CBS	(1 E) No. 8	vs. (2 E) Florida; SEC tournament championship	W 89–73	26–4	Georgia Dome (22,024); Atlanta
2004 NCAA Tournament
March 19, 2004; 6:45 pm, CBS	(1 MW) No. 2	vs. (16 MW) Florida A&M; First Round	W 96–76	27–4	Nationwide Arena (19,588); Columbus, Ohio
March 21, 2004; 4:30 pm, CBS	(1 MW) No. 2	vs. (9 MW) UAB; Second Round	L 75–76	27–5	Nationwide Arena (19,588); Columbus, Ohio
*Non-conference game. ^{#}Rankings from AP Poll. (#) Tournament seedings in parentheses.
