= 2004 NCAA Division I men's basketball tournament =

Edition of USA college basketball tournament

- Season: 2003–04
- Teams: 65
- Finals site: Alamodome, San Antonio, Texas
- Champions: Connecticut Huskies (2nd title, 2nd title game, 2nd Final Four)
- Runner-up: Georgia Tech Yellow Jackets (1st title game, 2nd Final Four)
- Semifinalists: Duke Blue Devils (14th Final Four); Oklahoma State Cowboys (6th Final Four)
- Winning coach: Jim Calhoun (2nd title)
- MOP: Emeka Okafor (Connecticut)
- Attendance: 716,899
- Top scorer: Ben Gordon (Connecticut) (154 points)

The 2004 NCAA Division I men's basketball tournament involved 65 schools playing in single-elimination play to determine the national champion of men's NCAA Division I college basketball. The 66th annual edition of the tournament began on March 16, 2004, and ended with the championship game on April 5 at the Alamodome in San Antonio, Texas. A total of 64 games were played.

The NCAA named, for the first time, the four tournament regions after regional site host cities instead of the "East", "Midwest", "South", and "West" designations. It was also the first year that the matchups for the national semifinals were determined at least in part by the overall seeding of the top team in each regional. The top four teams in the tournament were Kentucky, Duke, Stanford, and Saint Joseph's. Had all of those teams advanced to the Final Four, Kentucky would have played Saint Joseph's and Duke would have played Stanford in the semifinal games.

Of those teams, only Duke advanced to the Final Four. They were joined by Connecticut, making their first appearance since defeating Duke for the national championship in 1999, Oklahoma State, making their first appearance since 1995, and Georgia Tech, making their first appearance since 1990.

Connecticut defeated Georgia Tech 82–73 to win their second national championship in as many tries. Emeka Okafor of Connecticut was named the tournament's Most Outstanding Player.

As they had in 1999, Connecticut won their regional championship in Phoenix, Arizona.

Two of the tournament's top seeds failed to make it past the opening weekend. Kentucky, number one seed of the St. Louis region, and Stanford, #1 seed of the Phoenix region, both were defeated. Incidentally, both teams were defeated by schools from Alabama, as Kentucky fell to UAB while Stanford lost to Alabama.

Due to their strong 2003–04 season, Gonzaga achieved its highest NCAA tournament seed until 2013 by receiving the #2 seed in the St. Louis region. Gonzaga would receive a #1 seed in the 2013 tournament. The team failed to advance beyond the first weekend of the tournament, however.

== Schedule and venues ==
2004 play-in game (orange) and first and second rounds (green)
2004 Regionals (blue) and Final Four (red)

The following are the sites that were selected to host each round of the 2004 tournament:

Opening Round

- March 16
  - University of Dayton Arena, Dayton, Ohio (Host: University of Dayton)

First and Second Rounds

- March 18 and 20
  - HSBC Arena, Buffalo, New York (Hosts: Canisius College and Niagara University)
  - KeyArena, Seattle, Washington (Host: University of Washington)
  - Pepsi Center, Denver, Colorado (Hosts: Colorado State University and Mountain West Conference)
  - RBC Center, Raleigh, North Carolina (Host: North Carolina State University)
- March 19 and 21
  - Bradley Center, Milwaukee, Wisconsin (Host: Marquette University)
  - Kemper Arena, Kansas City, Missouri (Host: Big 12 Conference)
  - Nationwide Arena, Columbus, Ohio (Host: Ohio State University)
  - TD Waterhouse Centre, Orlando, Florida (Host: Stetson University)

Regional semifinals and finals (Sweet Sixteen and Elite Eight)

- March 25 and 27
  - East Rutherford Regional
    - Continental Airlines Arena, East Rutherford, New Jersey (Host: Rutgers University)
  - Phoenix Regional
    - America West Arena, Phoenix, Arizona (Host: Arizona State University)
- March 26 and 28
  - Atlanta Regional
    - Georgia Dome, Atlanta, Georgia (Host: Georgia Institute of Technology)
  - St. Louis Regional
    - Edward Jones Dome, St. Louis, Missouri (Host: Missouri Valley Conference)

National semifinals and championship (Final Four and championship)

- April 3 and 5
  - Alamodome, San Antonio, Texas (Host: University of Texas at San Antonio)

== Qualifying teams ==
=== Automatic bids ===
The following teams were automatic qualifiers for the 2004 NCAA field by virtue of winning their conference's tournament (except for the Ivy League, whose regular-season champion received the automatic bid).

Conference	School	Appearance	Last bid
ACC	Maryland	21st	2003
America East	Vermont	2nd	2003
Atlantic 10	Xavier	16th	2003
Atlantic Sun	Central Florida	3rd	1996
Big 12	Oklahoma State	21st	2003
Big East	Connecticut	25th	2003
Big Sky	Eastern Washington	1st	Never
Big South	Liberty	2nd	1994
Big Ten	Wisconsin	10th	2003
Big West	Pacific	6th	1997
Colonial	VCU	7th	1996
C-USA	Cincinnati	23rd	2003
Horizon	Illinois–Chicago	3rd	2002
Ivy League	Princeton	23rd	2001
MAAC	Manhattan	6th	2003
MAC	Western Michigan	3rd	1998
MEAC	Florida A&M	2nd	1999
Mid-Con	Valparaiso	7th	2002
Missouri Valley	Northern Iowa	2nd	1990
Mountain West	Utah	25th	2003
Northeast	Monmouth	3rd	2001
Ohio Valley	Murray State	12th	2002
Pac-10	Stanford	13th	2003
Patriot	Lehigh	3rd	1988
SEC	Kentucky	46th	2003
Southern	East Tennessee State	7th	2003
Southland	UTSA	3rd	1999
Sun Belt	Louisiana–Lafayette	8th	2000
SWAC	Alabama State	2nd	2001
WAC	Nevada	3rd	1985
West Coast	Gonzaga	7th	2003

=== Listed by region and seeding ===
East Rutherford Regional
Seed	School	Conference	Record	Berth Type
#1	Saint Joseph's	Atlantic 10	27–1	At-large
#2	Oklahoma State	Big 12	27–3	Automatic
#3	Pittsburgh	Big East	29–4	At-large
#4	Wake Forest	ACC	19–9	At-large
#5	Florida	SEC	20–10	At-large
#6	Wisconsin	Big Ten	24–6	Automatic
#7	Memphis	C-USA	21–7	At-large
#8	Texas Tech	Big 12	22–10	At-large
#9	Charlotte	C-USA	21–8	At-large
#10	South Carolina	SEC	23–10	At-large
#11	Richmond	Atlantic 10	20–12	At-large
#12	Manhattan	MAAC	24–5	Automatic
#13	VCU	CAA	23–7	Automatic
#14	Central Florida	Atlantic Sun	25–5	Automatic
#15	Eastern Washington	Big Sky	17–12	Automatic
#16	Liberty	Big South	18–14	Automatic

Atlanta Regional
Seed	School	Conference	Record	Berth Type
#1	Duke	ACC	27–5	At-large
#2	Mississippi State	SEC	25–3	At-large
#3	Texas	Big 12	23–7	At-large
#4	Cincinnati	C-USA	24–6	Automatic
#5	Illinois	Big Ten	24–6	At-large
#6	North Carolina	ACC	18–10	At-large
#7	Xavier	Atlantic 10	23–10	Automatic
#8	Seton Hall	Big East	20–9	At-large
#9	Arizona	Pac-10	20–9	At-large
#10	Louisville	C-USA	20–9	At-large
#11	Air Force	Mountain West	22–6	At-large
#12	Murray State	Ohio Valley	28–5	Automatic
#13	East Tennessee State	SoCon	27–5	Automatic
#14	Princeton	Ivy	20–7	Automatic
#15	Monmouth	Northeast	21–11	Automatic
#16	Alabama State	SWAC	16–14	Automatic

St. Louis Regional
Seed	School	Conference	Record	Berth Type
#1	Kentucky	SEC	26–4	Automatic
#2	Gonzaga	WCC	27–2	Automatic
#3	Georgia Tech	ACC	23–9	At-large
#4	Kansas	Big 12	21–8	At-large
#5	Providence	Big East	20–8	At-large
#6	Boston College	Big East	23–9	At-large
#7	Michigan State	Big Ten	18–11	At-large
#8	Washington	Pac-10	19–11	At-large
#9	UAB	C-USA	20–9	At-large
#10	Nevada	WAC	23–8	Automatic
#11	Utah	Mountain West	24–8	Automatic
#12	Pacific	Big West	25–7	Automatic
#13	Illinois–Chicago	Horizon	24–7	Automatic
#14	Northern Iowa	Missouri Valley	21–9	Automatic
#15	Valparaiso	Mid-Continent	18–12	Automatic
#16	Florida A&M	MEAC	14–16	Automatic
#16	Lehigh	Patriot	20–10	Automatic

Phoenix Regional
Seed	School	Conference	Record	Berth Type
#1	Stanford	Pac-10	29–1	Automatic
#2	Connecticut	Big East	27–6	Automatic
#3	NC State	ACC	20–9	At-large
#4	Maryland	ACC	19–11	Automatic
#5	Syracuse	Big East	21–7	At-large
#6	Vanderbilt	SEC	21–9	At-large
#7	DePaul	C-USA	21–9	At-large
#8	Alabama	SEC	17–12	At-large
#9	Southern Illinois	Missouri Valley	25–4	At-large
#10	Dayton	Atlantic 10	24–8	At-large
#11	Western Michigan	Mid-American	26–4	Automatic
#12	BYU	Mountain West	21–8	At-large
#13	UTEP	WAC	24–7	At-large
#14	Louisiana–Lafayette (vacated)	Sun Belt	20–8	Automatic
#15	Vermont	America East	22–8	Automatic
#16	UTSA	Southland	19–13	Automatic

=== Bids by conference ===
Bids	Conference	Schools
6	ACC	Duke, Georgia Tech, Maryland, NC State, North Carolina, Wake Forest
6	Big East	Boston College, Connecticut, Pittsburgh, Providence, Seton Hall, Syracuse
6	C-USA	Charlotte, Cincinnati, DePaul, Louisville, Memphis, UAB
6	SEC	Alabama, Florida, Kentucky, Mississippi State, South Carolina, Vanderbilt
4	Atlantic 10	Dayton, Richmond, Saint Joseph's, Xavier
4	Big 12	Kansas, Oklahoma State, Texas, Texas Tech
3	Big Ten	Illinois, Michigan State, Wisconsin
3	Mountain West	Air Force, BYU, Utah
3	Pac-10	Arizona, Stanford, Washington
2	Missouri Valley	Northern Iowa, Southern Illinois
2	WAC	Nevada, UTEP
1	20 other conferences	

== Record by conference ==
Conference	# of Bids	Record	Win %	R32	S16	E8	F4	CG
Big East	6	12–5	.706	5	3	1	1	1
SEC	6	7–6	.538	4	2	1	–	–
Big Ten	3	3–3	.500	2	1	–	–	–
ACC	6	14–6	.700	6	3	2	2	1
Big 12	4	10–4	.714	4	3	2	1	–
Pac-10	3	1–3	.250	1	–	–	–	–
Missouri Valley	2	0–2	.000	–	–	–	–	–
Atlantic 10	4	6–4	.600	2	2	2	–	–
C–USA	6	5–6	.455	4	1	–	–	–
MWC	3	0–3	.000	–	–	–	–	–
WAC	2	2–2	.500	1	1	–	–	–
MAAC	1	1–1	.500	1	–	–	–	–
WCC	1	1–1	.500	1	–	–	–	–
Big West	1	1–1	.500	1	–	–	–	–
MEAC	1	1–1*	.500	–	–	–	–	–

*Florida A&M University won the Opening Round game.

The America East, Atlantic Sun, Big Sky, Big South, CAA, Horizon League, Mid-Continent, Ivy, MAC, MEAC, Northeast, Ohio Valley, Patriot, SoCon, Southland, SWAC, and Sun Belt conferences all went 0–1.

The columns R32, S16, E8, F4, and CG respectively stand for the Round of 32, Sweet Sixteen, Elite Eight, Final Four, and championship Game.

== Final Four ==
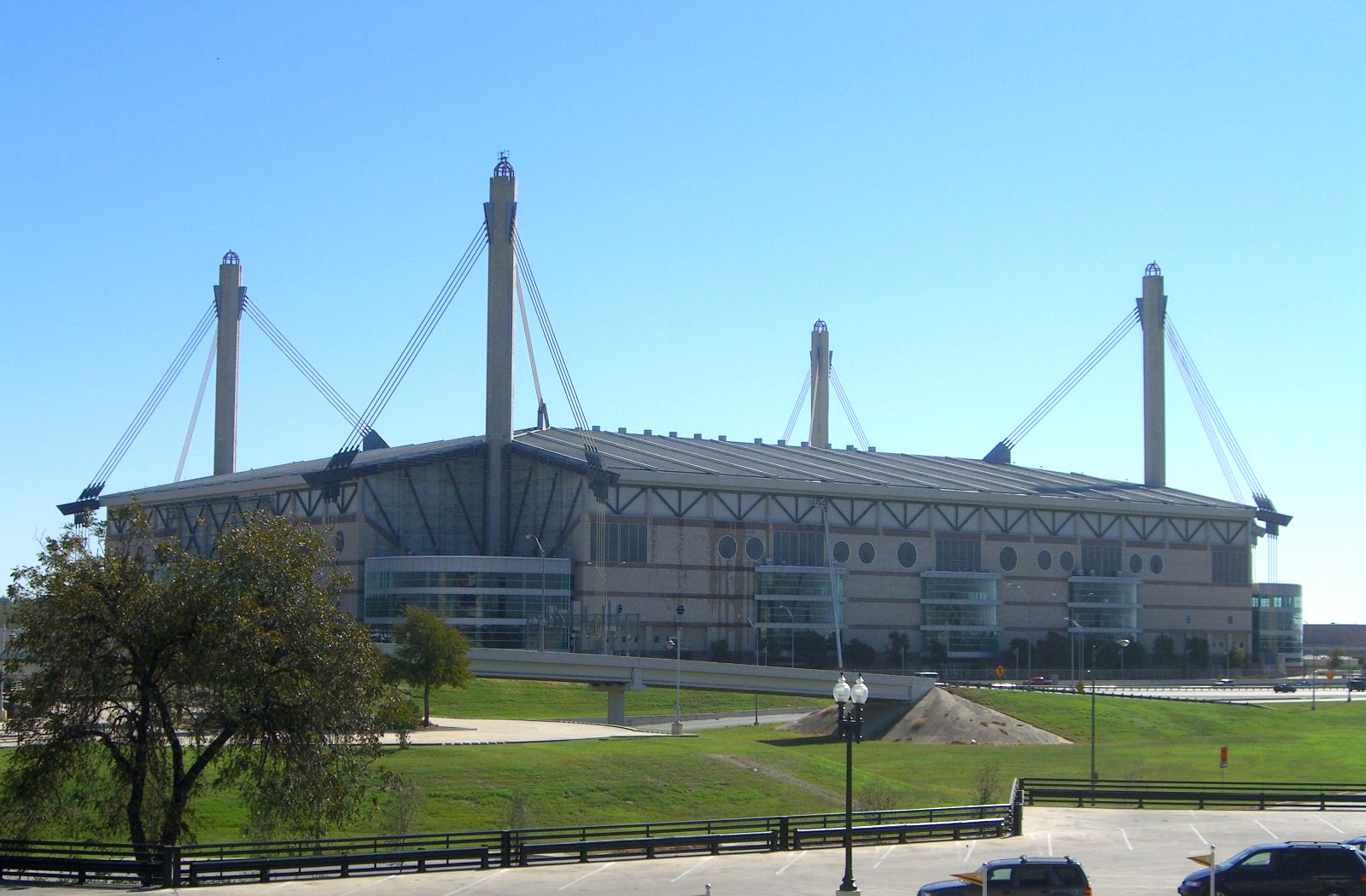
The Alamodome was host of the Final Four and National Championship in 2004.

At Alamodome, San Antonio, Texas

=== National semifinals ===
- April 3, 2004
  - Connecticut (W2) 79, Duke (S1) 78
- With the Connecticut Huskies trailing by 8 points with less than 3 minutes to go, it looked as if the Duke Blue Devils were going to spoil Jim Calhoun's chance at a second national title. Connecticut's All-American center Emeka Okafor was limited to just 22 minutes because of early foul trouble, but he came up clutch with several big plays down the stretch and finished with 18 points and only 3 fouls. By contrast, all three of Duke's centers fouled out, including Shelden Williams, who committed his fifth foul with 3:04 to play. In addition, Duke went without a field goal for the last 4 1/2 minutes until Chris Duhon's meaningless three-pointer at the buzzer. Duke coach Mike Krzyzewski was denied his 65th NCAA Tournament victory which would have tied him with Dean Smith for the all-time record. He later broke that record.
  - Georgia Tech (M3) 67, Oklahoma State (E2) 65
  Will Bynum's layup in the final moments kept the Georgia Tech Yellow Jackets dream for a National Championship alive as they defeated the Oklahoma State Cowboys, in a nail-biter, in the first of the national semifinal doubleheader. Georgia Tech led for most of the game including a seven-point edge at halftime. However, Oklahoma State was able to tie the game on John Lucas's three-pointer with 26.3 seconds left. Georgia Tech then milked the clock which set up Bynum's game-winner. Georgia Tech advanced to their first ever National Championship appearance. Oklahoma State coach Eddie Sutton was denied yet another chance at an elusive national title.

=== National Championship Game ===
- April 5, 2004
  - Connecticut (W2) 82, Georgia Tech (M3) 73
  The 2004 National Championship Game proved to be a coronation for the Connecticut Huskies as they handled Paul Hewitt's Georgia Tech Yellow Jackets. Emeka Okafor led Connecticut with 24 points and was an easy choice for Most Outstanding Player of the tournament. Guard Ben Gordon added 21 points to Connecticut's cause. The victory gave Connecticut coach Jim Calhoun his second National Championship (1999).

== Bracket ==
=== Opening Round game – Dayton, Ohio ===
Winner advances to 16th seed in St. Louis Regional vs. (1) Kentucky.

Opening Round Game; March 16
16a	Florida A&M	72
16b	Lehigh	57

=== East Rutherford Regional ===
First round March 18–19
1	Saint Joseph's	82
16	Liberty	63
Buffalo - Thu/Sat
8	Texas Tech	76
9	Charlotte	73
5	Florida	60
12	Manhattan	75
Raleigh - Thu/Sat
4	Wake Forest	79
13	VCU	78
6	Wisconsin	76
11	Richmond	64
Milwaukee - Fri/Sun
3	Pittsburgh	53
14	Central Florida	44
7	Memphis	59
10	South Carolina	43
Kansas City - Fri/Sun
2	Oklahoma State	75
15	Eastern Washington	56

Second round March 20–21
1	Saint Joseph's	70
8	Texas Tech	65
12	Manhattan	80
4	Wake Forest	84
6	Wisconsin	55
3	Pittsburgh	59
7	Memphis	53
2	Oklahoma State	70

Regional semifinals March 25
1	Saint Joseph's	84
4	Wake Forest	80
3	Pittsburgh	51
2	Oklahoma State	63

Regional finals March 27
1	Saint Joseph's	62
2	Oklahoma State	64

=== St. Louis Regional ===
First round March 18–19
1	Kentucky	96
16	Florida A&M	76
Columbus - Fri/Sun
8	Washington	100
9	UAB	102
5	Providence	58
12	Pacific	66
Kansas City - Fri/Sun
4	Kansas	78
13	UIC	53
6	Boston College	58
11	Utah	51
Milwaukee - Fri/Sun
3	Georgia Tech	65
14	Northern Iowa	60
7	Michigan State	66
10	Nevada	72
Seattle - Thu/Sat
2	Gonzaga	76
15	Valparaiso	49

Second round March 20–21
1	Kentucky	75
9	UAB	76
12	Pacific	63
4	Kansas	78
6	Boston College	54
3	Georgia Tech	57
10	Nevada	91
2	Gonzaga	72

Regional semifinals March 26
9	UAB	74
4	Kansas	100
3	Georgia Tech	72
10	Nevada	67

Regional finals March 28
4	Kansas	71
3	Georgia Tech	79^{OT}

=== Atlanta Regional ===
First round March 18–19
1	Duke	96
16	Alabama State	61
Raleigh - Thu/Sat
8	Seton Hall	80
9	Arizona	76
5	Illinois	72
12	Murray State	53
Columbus - Fri/Sun
4	Cincinnati	80
13	East Tennessee State	77
6	North Carolina	63
11	Air Force	52
Denver - Thu/Sat
3	Texas	66
14	Princeton	49
7	Xavier	80
10	Louisville	70
Orlando - Fri/Sun
2	Mississippi State	85
15	Monmouth	52

Second round March 20–21
1	Duke	90
8	Seton Hall	62
5	Illinois	92
4	Cincinnati	68
6	North Carolina	75
3	Texas	78
7	Xavier	89
2	Mississippi State	74

Regional semifinals March 26
1	Duke	72
5	Illinois	62
3	Texas	71
7	Xavier	79

Regional finals March 28
1	Duke	66
7	Xavier	63

=== Phoenix Regional ===
First round March 18–19
1	Stanford	71
16	UTSA	45
Seattle - Thu/Sat
8	Alabama	65
9	Southern Illinois	64
5	Syracuse	80
12	BYU	75
Denver - Thu/Sat
4	Maryland	86
13	UTEP	83
6	Vanderbilt	71
11	Western Michigan	58
Orlando - Fri/Sun
3	NC State	61
14	Louisiana–Lafayette	52
7	DePaul	76^{2OT}
10	Dayton	69
Buffalo - Thu/Sat
2	Connecticut	70
15	Vermont	53

Second round March 20–21
1	Stanford	67
8	Alabama	70
5	Syracuse	72
4	Maryland	70
6	Vanderbilt	75
3	North Carolina State	73
7	DePaul	55
2	Connecticut	72

Regional semifinals March 25
8	Alabama	80
5	Syracuse	71
6	Vanderbilt	53
2	Connecticut	73

Regional finals March 27
8	Alabama	71
2	Connecticut	87

=== Final Four – San Antonio, Texas ===
National semifinals April 3
ER2	Oklahoma State	65
SL3	Georgia Tech	67
AT1	Duke	78
PH2	Connecticut	79

National Championship Game; April 5
SL3	Georgia Tech	73
PH2	Connecticut	82

== Game summaries ==
=== Final four ===
CBS

April 3
6:07 pm

box score

#3 Georgia Tech Yellow Jackets 67, #2 Oklahoma State Cowboys 65
Scoring by half: 37–30, 30–35
Pts: L. Schenscher – 19; Rebs: L. Schenscher – 12; Asts: J. Jack – 5	Pts: J. Graham – 17; Rebs: J. Graham – 10; Asts: T. Allen – 4

Alamodome – San Antonio, TX
Attendance: 44,417
Referees: Donnie Gray, Jim Burr, Tim Higgins

CBS

April 3
8:47 pm

box score

#2 Connecticut Huskies 79, #1 Duke Blue Devils 78
Scoring by half: 34–41, 45–37
Pts: E. Okafor, B. Gordon – 18; Rebs: J. Boone – 14; Asts: T. Brown – 4	Pts: L. Deng – 16; Rebs: L. Deng – 12; Asts: C. Duhon – 6

Alamodome – San Antonio, TX
Attendance: 44,417
Referees: David Hall, Olandis Poole, Ted Hillary

=== National Championship ===
CBS

April 5
9:21 pm

Box score

#2 Connecticut Huskies 82, #3 Georgia Tech Yellow Jackets 73
Scoring by half: 41–26, 41–47
Pts: E. Okafor – 24; Rebs: E. Okafor – 15; Asts: T. Brown – 4	Pts: W. Bynum – 17; Rebs: L.Schenscher – 11; Asts: W. Bynum – 5

Alamodome – San Antonio, TX
Attendance: 44,468
Referees: Dick Cartmell, Randy McCall, Verne Harris

== Announcers ==
- Jim Nantz/Billy Packer/Bonnie Bernstein – First & Second Round at Denver, Colorado; East Rutherford Regional at East Rutherford, New Jersey; Final Four at San Antonio, Texas
- Dick Enberg/Matt Guokas/Armen Keteyian/Heather Cox – First & Second Round at Columbus, Ohio; Phoenix Regional at Phoenix, Arizona
- Verne Lundquist/Bill Raftery/Solomon Wilcots – First & Second Round at Buffalo, New York; Atlanta Regional at Atlanta, Georgia
- Gus Johnson/Len Elmore/Dwayne Ballen – First & Second Round at Orlando, Florida; St. Louis Regional at St. Louis, Missouri
- Kevin Harlan/Dan Bonner/Tracy Wolfson – First & Second Round at Raleigh, North Carolina
- Ian Eagle and Jim Spanarkel – First & Second Round at Seattle, Washington
- Craig Bolerjack/Bob Wenzel/Scott Kaplan – First & Second Round at Kansas City, Missouri
- Tim Brando/Mike Gminski/Heather Cox – First & Second Round at Milwaukee, Wisconsin

Greg Gumbel once again served as the studio host, joined by analysts Clark Kellogg and Seth Davis.

== See also ==
- 2004 NCAA Division I women's basketball tournament
- 2004 NCAA Division II women's basketball tournament
- 2004 NCAA Division III women's basketball tournament
- 2004 National Invitation Tournament
- 2004 Women's National Invitation Tournament
- 2004 NAIA Division I men's basketball tournament
- 2004 NAIA Division II men's basketball tournament
- 2004 NAIA Division I women's basketball tournament
- 2004 NAIA Division II women's basketball tournament
