= 2003–04 NCAA Division I men's basketball season =

Basketball season

- Preseason AP No. 1: Connecticut Huskies
- Regular season: November 10, 2003– March 14, 2004
- NCAA Tournament: 2004
- Tournament dates: March 16 – April 5, 2004
- National Championship: Alamodome; San Antonio, Texas
- NCAA Champions: Connecticut Huskies
- Other champions: Michigan Wolverines (NIT)
- Player of the Year (Naismith, Wooden): Jameer Nelson, St. Joseph's Hawks

The 2003–04 NCAA Division I men's basketball season began on November 10, 2003, progressed through the regular season and conference tournaments, and concluded with the 2004 NCAA Men's Division I Basketball Tournament Championship Game on April 5, 2004, at the Alamodome in San Antonio, Texas. The Connecticut Huskies won their second NCAA national championship with an 82–73 victory over the Georgia Tech Yellow Jackets.

== Season headlines ==
- The preseason AP All-American team was named on November 12. Emeka Okafor of Connecticut was the leading vote-getter (71 of 72 votes). The rest of the team included Jameer Nelson of Saint Joseph's (49 votes), Rickey Paulding of Missouri (37), Ike Diogu of Arizona State (34) and Raymond Felton of North Carolina (24).
- The National Invitation Tournament (NIT) abolished its third-place game between the teams which lost in the semifinals. The tournament had included a third-place game from 1938 through 1981 and again from 1984 through 2003.

== Major rule changes ==
Beginning in 2003–04, the following rules changes were implemented:

- Officials could consult courtside monitor at the end of either half or any extra period to determine: (1) if a field-goal try beat the horn; (2) whether a shot-clock violation at the end of the first half beat the horn; or, (3) whether a shot-clock violation that would determine the outcome of a game beat the horn. The officials also could use a courtside monitor to correct a timer’s mistake or to determine if the game clock or shot clock expired at or near the end of a period.
- A team would have control when a player of that team had disposal of the ball for a throw-in.

== Season outlook ==
=== Pre-season polls ===
The top 25 from the AP and ESPN/USA Today Coaches Polls November 13, 2003.

Associated Press
| Ranking | Team |
|---|---|
| 1 | Connecticut (69) |
| 2 | Duke (1) |
| 3 | Michigan State (1) |
| 4 | Arizona |
| 5 | Missouri |
| 6 | Kansas (1) |
| 7 | Syracuse |
| 8 | Florida |
| 9 | North Carolina |
| 10 | Kentucky |
| 11 | Texas |
| 12 | Illinois |
| 13 | St. Joseph's |
| 14 | Oklahoma |
| 15 | Wisconsin |
| 16 | Gonzaga |
| 17 | Louisville |
| 18 | Cincinnati |
| 19 | Wake Forest |
| 20 | Stanford |
| 21 | Notre Dame |
| 22 | Pittsburgh |
| 23 | Marquette |
| 24 | North Carolina State |
| 25 | Oklahoma State |

ESPN/USA Today Coaches
| Ranking | Team |
|---|---|
| 1 | Connecticut (25) |
| 2 | Duke (3) |
| 3 | Michigan State (1) |
| 4 | Arizona |
| 5 | Kansas |
| 6 | Missouri |
| 7 | Syracuse |
| 8 | Florida |
| 9 | Kentucky |
| 10 | North Carolina |
| 11 | Texas |
| 12 | Gonzaga |
| 13 | Illinois |
| 14 | Wisconsin |
| 15 | Oklahoma |
| 16 | Louisville |
| 17 | Stanford |
| 18 | St. Joseph's |
| 19 | Cincinnati |
| 19 | Notre Dame |
| 21 | Wake Forest |
| 22 | Pittsburgh |
| 23 | Marquette |
| 24 | Oklahoma State |
| 25 | Maryland |

== Conference membership changes ==
These schools joined new conferences for the 2003–04 season.

| School | Former conference | New conference |
|---|---|---|
| Birmingham–Southern Panthers | NCAA Division I independent | Big South Conference |
| Centenary Gentlemen | NCAA Division I independent | Mid-Continent Conference |
| Elon Phoenix | Big South Conference | Southern Conference |
| Jacksonville State Gamecocks | Atlantic Sun Conference | Ohio Valley Conference |
| Lipscomb Bisons | NCAA Division I Independent | Atlantic Sun Conference |
| Maryland Baltimore County (UMBC) Retrievers | Northeast Conference | America East Conference |
| Morris Brown Wolverines | NCAA Division I independent | Discontinued athletic programs |
| Samford Bulldogs | Atlantic Sun Conference | Ohio Valley Conference |
| Utah Valley Wolverines | Scenic West Athletic Conference (NJCAA) | NCAA Division I Independent |
| VMI Keydets | Southern Conference | Big South Conference |

== Regular season ==
=== Conferences ===
==== Conference winners and tournaments ====
| Conference | Regular Season Winner | Conference Player of the Year | Conference Tournament | Tournament Venue (City) | Tournament winner |
|---|---|---|---|---|---|
| America East Conference | Boston University | Taylor Coppenrath, Vermont | 2004 America East men's basketball tournament | Walter Brown Arena (Boston, Massachusetts) (Except Finals) | Vermont |
| Atlantic 10 Conference | St. Joseph's (East); Dayton (West) | Jameer Nelson, St. Joseph's | 2004 Atlantic 10 men's basketball tournament | University of Dayton Arena (Dayton, Ohio) | Xavier |
| Atlantic Coast Conference | Duke | Julius Hodge, North Carolina State | 2004 ACC men's basketball tournament | Greensboro Coliseum (Greensboro, North Carolina) | Maryland |
| Atlantic Sun Conference | Troy | Greg Davis, Troy | 2004 Atlantic Sun men's basketball tournament | Curb Event Center (Nashville, Tennessee) | Central Florida |
| Big 12 Conference | Oklahoma State | Tony Allen, Oklahoma State | 2004 Big 12 men's basketball tournament | American Airlines Center (Dallas, Texas) | Oklahoma State |
| Big East Conference | Pittsburgh | Emeka Okafor, Connecticut | 2004 Big East men's basketball tournament | Madison Square Garden (New York City, New York) | Connecticut |
| Big Sky Conference | Eastern Washington | Alvin Snow, Eastern Washington | 2004 Big Sky men's basketball tournament | Reese Court (Cheney, Washington) (Semifinals and Finals) | Eastern Washington |
| Big South Conference | Birmingham-Southern & Liberty | Danny Gathings, High Point | 2004 Big South Conference men's basketball tournament | Campus Sites | Liberty |
| Big Ten Conference | Illinois | Devin Harris, Wisconsin | 2004 Big Ten Conference men's basketball tournament | Conseco Fieldhouse (Indianapolis, Indiana) | Wisconsin |
| Big West Conference | Utah State & Pacific | Miah Davis, Pacific | 2004 Big West Conference men's basketball tournament | Anaheim Convention Center (Anaheim, California) | Pacific |
| Colonial Athletic Association | Virginia Commonwealth | Domonic Jones, Virginia Commonwealth | 2004 CAA men's basketball tournament | Richmond Coliseum (Richmond, Virginia) | Virginia Commonwealth |
| Conference USA | Cincinnati, Memphis, Charlotte, DePaul & UAB | Antonio Burks, Memphis | 2004 Conference USA men's basketball tournament | U.S. Bank Arena (Cincinnati, Ohio) | Cincinnati |
| Horizon League | Wisconsin-Milwaukee | Dylan Page, Wisconsin-Milwaukee | 2004 Horizon League men's basketball tournament | U.S. Cellular Arena (Milwaukee, Wisconsin) (Except First Round) | Wisconsin-Milwaukee |
| Ivy League | Princeton | Jason Forte, Brown | No Tournament | | |
| Metro Atlantic Athletic Conference | Manhattan | Luis Flores, Manhattan | 2004 MAAC men's basketball tournament | Pepsi Arena (Albany, New York) | Manhattan |
| Mid-American Conference | Kent State (East); Western Michigan (West) | Mike Williams, Western Michigan | 2004 MAC men's basketball tournament | Gund Arena (Cleveland, Ohio) | Western Michigan |
| Mid-Continent Conference | Valparaiso | Odell Bradley, IUPUI | 2004 Mid-Continent Conference men's basketball tournament | Kemper Arena (Kansas City, Missouri) | Valparaiso |
| Mid-Eastern Athletic Conference | South Carolina State & Coppin State | Thurman Zimmerman, South Carolina State | 2004 Mid-Eastern Athletic Conference men's basketball tournament | Richmond Coliseum (Richmond, Virginia) | Florida A&M |
| Missouri Valley Conference | Southern Illinois | Darren Brooks, Southern Illinois | 2004 Missouri Valley Conference men's basketball tournament | Savvis Center (St. Louis, Missouri) | Northern Iowa |
| Mountain West Conference | Air Force | Rafael Araújo, Brigham Young & Nick Welch, Air Force | 2004 MWC men's basketball tournament | Pepsi Center (Denver, Colorado) | Utah |
| Northeast Conference | Monmouth & St. Francis (NY) | Ron Robinson, Central Connecticut State | 2004 Northeast Conference men's basketball tournament | Campus Sites | Monmouth |
| Ohio Valley Conference | Austin Peay | Cuthbert Victor, Murray State | 2004 Ohio Valley Conference men's basketball tournament | Nashville Municipal Auditorium (Nashville, Tennessee) (Semifinals and Finals) | Murray State |
| Pacific-10 Conference | Stanford | Josh Childress, Stanford | 2004 Pacific-10 Conference men's basketball tournament | Staples Center (Los Angeles, California) | Stanford |
| Patriot League | Lehigh & American | Austen Rowland, Lehigh | 2004 Patriot League men's basketball tournament | Campus Sites | Lehigh |
| Southeastern Conference | Kentucky (East); Mississippi State (West) | Lawrence Roberts, Mississippi State | 2004 SEC men's basketball tournament | Georgia Dome (Atlanta, Georgia) | Kentucky |
| Southern Conference | East Tennessee State (North); Georgia Southern, Charleston & Davidson (South) | Zakee Wadood, East Tennessee State | 2004 Southern Conference men's basketball tournament | North Charleston Coliseum (North Charleston, South Carolina) | East Tennessee State |
| Southland Conference | Southeastern Louisiana, Texas-San Antonio & Texas–Arlington | LeRoy Hurd, Texas-San Antonio | 2004 Southland Conference men's basketball tournament | Convocation Center (San Antonio, Texas) (Finals) | Texas-San Antonio |
| Southwestern Athletic Conference | Mississippi Valley State | Attarius Norwood, Mississippi Valley State | 2004 Southwestern Athletic Conference men's basketball tournament | Fair Park Arena (Birmingham, Alabama) | Alabama State |
| Sun Belt Conference | Arkansas-Little Rock (East); Louisiana-Lafayette (West) | Mike Wells, Western Kentucky | 2004 Sun Belt men's basketball tournament | E. A. Diddle Arena (Bowling Green, Kentucky) | Louisiana-Lafayette |
| West Coast Conference | Gonzaga | Blake Stepp, Gonzaga | 2004 West Coast Conference men's basketball tournament | Leavey Center (Santa Clara, California) | Gonzaga |
| Western Athletic Conference | UTEP & Nevada | Kirk Snyder, Nevada | 2004 WAC men's basketball tournament | Save Mart Center (Fresno, California) | Nevada |

==== Conference standings ====
2003–04 America East Conference men's basketball standings
| | Conf. | | | | Overall |
| Team | W | | L | PCT | W | | L | PCT |
|---|---|---|---|---|---|---|---|---|
| Boston University | 17 | – | 1 | .944 | 23 | – | 6 | .793 |
| Vermont † | 15 | – | 3 | .833 | 22 | – | 9 | .710 |
| Northeastern | 13 | – | 5 | .722 | 19 | – | 11 | .633 |
| Maine | 12 | – | 6 | .667 | 20 | – | 10 | .667 |
| Binghamton | 10 | – | 8 | .556 | 14 | – | 16 | .467 |
| Hartford | 6 | – | 12 | .333 | 12 | – | 17 | .414 |
| New Hampshire | 5 | – | 13 | .278 | 10 | – | 20 | .333 |
| Stony Brook | 5 | – | 13 | .278 | 10 | – | 20 | .333 |
| UMBC | 4 | – | 14 | .222 | 7 | – | 21 | .250 |
| Albany | 3 | – | 15 | .167 | 5 | – | 23 | .179 |
† 2004 America East tournament winner

2003–04 ACC men's basketball standings
| | Conf. | | | | Overall |
| Team | W | | L | PCT | W | | L | PCT |
|---|---|---|---|---|---|---|---|---|
| No. 6 Duke | 13 | – | 3 | .813 | 31 | – | 6 | .838 |
| No. 15 NC State | 11 | – | 5 | .688 | 21 | – | 10 | .677 |
| No. 17 Wake Forest | 9 | – | 7 | .563 | 21 | – | 10 | .677 |
| No. 14 Georgia Tech | 9 | – | 7 | .563 | 28 | – | 10 | .737 |
| No. 18 North Carolina | 8 | – | 8 | .500 | 19 | – | 11 | .633 |
| No. 19 Maryland† | 7 | – | 9 | .438 | 20 | – | 12 | .625 |
| Florida State | 6 | – | 10 | .375 | 19 | – | 14 | .576 |
| Virginia | 6 | – | 10 | .375 | 18 | – | 13 | .581 |
| Clemson | 3 | – | 13 | .188 | 10 | – | 18 | .357 |
† 2004 ACC tournament winner Rankings from AP Poll

2003–04 Atlantic 10 men's basketball standings
| | Conf. | | | | Overall |
| Team | W | | L | PCT | W | | L | PCT |
|---|---|---|---|---|---|---|---|---|
East
| No. 5 Saint Joseph's | 16 | – | 0 | 1.000 | 30 | – | 2 | .938 |
| Temple | 9 | – | 7 | .563 | 15 | – | 14 | .517 |
| Rhode Island | 7 | – | 9 | .438 | 20 | – | 14 | .588 |
| UMass | 4 | – | 12 | .250 | 10 | – | 19 | .345 |
| St. Bonaventure | 3 | – | 13 | .188 | 7 | – | 21 | .250 |
| Fordham | 3 | – | 13 | .188 | 6 | – | 22 | .214 |
West
| Dayton | 12 | – | 4 | .750 | 24 | – | 9 | .727 |
| George Washington | 11 | – | 5 | .688 | 18 | – | 12 | .600 |
| Xavier † | 10 | – | 6 | .625 | 26 | – | 11 | .703 |
| Richmond | 10 | – | 6 | .625 | 20 | – | 13 | .606 |
| Duquesne | 6 | – | 10 | .375 | 12 | – | 17 | .414 |
| La Salle | 5 | – | 11 | .313 | 10 | – | 20 | .333 |
† 2004 Atlantic 10 Tournament winner Rankings from AP Poll

2003–04 Atlantic Sun men's basketball standings
| | Conf. | | | | Overall |
| Team | W | | L | PCT | W | | L | PCT |
|---|---|---|---|---|---|---|---|---|
| Troy State | 18 | – | 2 | .900 | 24 | – | 7 | .774 |
| UCF † | 17 | – | 3 | .850 | 25 | – | 6 | .806 |
| Belmont | 15 | – | 5 | .750 | 21 | – | 9 | .700 |
| Georgia State | 14 | – | 6 | .700 | 20 | – | 9 | .690 |
| Stetson | 10 | – | 10 | .500 | 12 | – | 15 | .444 |
| Mercer | 9 | – | 11 | .450 | 12 | – | 18 | .400 |
| Jacksonville | 8 | – | 12 | .400 | 13 | – | 15 | .464 |
| Florida Atlantic | 6 | – | 14 | .300 | 9 | – | 19 | .321 |
| Gardner–Webb | 6 | – | 14 | .300 | 9 | – | 20 | .310 |
| Lipscomb | 4 | – | 16 | .200 | 7 | – | 21 | .250 |
| Campbell | 3 | – | 17 | .150 | 3 | – | 24 | .111 |
† 2004 Atlantic Sun Tournament winner As of March 2, 2004; Rankings from AP Poll

2003–04 Big 12 men's basketball standings
| | Conf. | | | | Overall |
| Team | W | | L | PCT | W | | L | PCT |
|---|---|---|---|---|---|---|---|---|
| No. 4 Oklahoma State † | 14 | – | 2 | .875 | 31 | – | 4 | .886 |
| No. 12 Texas | 12 | – | 4 | .750 | 25 | – | 8 | .758 |
| No. 16 Kansas | 12 | – | 4 | .750 | 24 | – | 9 | .727 |
| Colorado | 10 | – | 6 | .625 | 18 | – | 11 | .621 |
| Texas Tech | 9 | – | 7 | .563 | 23 | – | 11 | .676 |
| Missouri | 9 | – | 7 | .563 | 16 | – | 14 | .533 |
| Oklahoma | 8 | – | 8 | .500 | 20 | – | 11 | .645 |
| Iowa State | 7 | – | 9 | .438 | 20 | – | 13 | .606 |
| Kansas State | 6 | – | 10 | .375 | 14 | – | 14 | .500 |
| Nebraska | 6 | – | 10 | .375 | 18 | – | 13 | .581 |
| Baylor | 3 | – | 13 | .188 | 8 | – | 21 | .276 |
| Texas A&M | 0 | – | 16 | .000 | 7 | – | 21 | .250 |
† 2004 Big 12 Tournament winner Rankings from AP poll

2003–04 Big East men's basketball standings
| | Conf. | | | | Overall |
| Team | W | | L | PCT | W | | L | PCT |
|---|---|---|---|---|---|---|---|---|
| No. 9 Pittsburgh | 13 | – | 3 | .813 | 31 | – | 5 | .861 |
| No. 7 Connecticut † | 12 | – | 4 | .750 | 33 | – | 6 | .846 |
| No. 21 Providence | 11 | – | 5 | .688 | 20 | – | 9 | .690 |
| No. 20 Syracuse | 11 | – | 5 | .688 | 23 | – | 8 | .742 |
| No. 25 Boston College | 10 | – | 6 | .625 | 24 | – | 10 | .706 |
| Seton Hall | 10 | – | 6 | .625 | 21 | – | 12 | .636 |
| Notre Dame | 9 | – | 7 | .563 | 19 | – | 13 | .594 |
| Virginia Tech | 7 | – | 9 | .438 | 15 | – | 14 | .517 |
| Rutgers | 7 | – | 9 | .438 | 20 | – | 13 | .606 |
| West Virginia | 7 | – | 9 | .438 | 17 | – | 14 | .548 |
| Villanova | 6 | – | 10 | .375 | 18 | – | 17 | .514 |
| Georgetown | 4 | – | 12 | .250 | 13 | – | 15 | .464 |
| Miami (FL)* | 4 | – | 12 | .250 | 14 | – | 16 | .467 |
| St. John's*# | 1 | – | 15 | .063 | 2 | – | 21 | .087 |
† 2004 Big East tournament winner As of April 5, 2004; Rankings from AP Poll; *Did not qualify for 2004 Big East tournament. #St. John's had 4 regular-season games vacated due to sanctions against the program; the school′s disputed record was 1–15, 6–21.

2003–04 Big Sky men's basketball standings
| | Conf. | | | | Overall |
| Team | W | | L | PCT | W | | L | PCT |
|---|---|---|---|---|---|---|---|---|
| Eastern Washington † | 11 | – | 3 | .786 | 17 | – | 13 | .567 |
| Northern Arizona | 7 | – | 7 | .500 | 15 | – | 14 | .517 |
| Weber State | 7 | – | 7 | .500 | 15 | – | 14 | .517 |
| Sacramento State | 7 | – | 7 | .500 | 13 | – | 15 | .464 |
| Idaho State | 7 | – | 7 | .500 | 13 | – | 18 | .419 |
| Montana State | 6 | – | 8 | .429 | 14 | – | 13 | .519 |
| Montana | 6 | – | 8 | .429 | 10 | – | 18 | .357 |
| Portland State | 5 | – | 9 | .357 | 11 | – | 16 | .407 |
† Conference tournament winner

2003–04 Big South Conference men's basketball standings
| | Conf. | | | | Overall |
| Team | W | | L | PCT | W | | L | PCT |
|---|---|---|---|---|---|---|---|---|
| Birmingham–Southern | 12 | – | 4 | .750 | 19 | – | 7 | .731 |
| Liberty † | 12 | – | 4 | .750 | 18 | – | 15 | .545 |
| High Point | 10 | – | 6 | .625 | 19 | – | 11 | .633 |
| Winthrop | 10 | – | 6 | .625 | 16 | – | 12 | .571 |
| Coastal Carolina | 8 | – | 8 | .500 | 14 | – | 15 | .483 |
| Radford | 7 | – | 9 | .438 | 12 | – | 16 | .429 |
| UNC Asheville | 6 | – | 10 | .375 | 9 | – | 20 | .310 |
| VMI | 4 | – | 12 | .250 | 6 | – | 22 | .214 |
| Charleston Southern | 3 | – | 13 | .188 | 6 | – | 22 | .214 |
† 2004 Big South tournament winner Rankings from AP Poll

2003–04 Big Ten Conference men's basketball standings
| | Conf. | | | | Overall |
| Team | W | | L | PCT | W | | L | PCT |
|---|---|---|---|---|---|---|---|---|
| No. 13 Illinois | 13 | – | 3 | .813 | 26 | – | 7 | .788 |
| No. 10 Wisconsin † | 12 | – | 4 | .750 | 25 | – | 7 | .781 |
| Michigan State | 12 | – | 4 | .750 | 18 | – | 12 | .600 |
| Iowa | 9 | – | 7 | .563 | 16 | – | 13 | .552 |
| Michigan | 8 | – | 8 | .500 | 23 | – | 11 | .676 |
| Northwestern | 8 | – | 8 | .500 | 14 | – | 15 | .483 |
| Purdue | 7 | – | 9 | .438 | 17 | – | 14 | .548 |
| Indiana | 7 | – | 9 | .438 | 14 | – | 15 | .483 |
| Ohio State | 6 | – | 10 | .375 | 14 | – | 16 | .467 |
| Minnesota | 3 | – | 13 | .188 | 12 | – | 18 | .400 |
| Penn State | 3 | – | 13 | .188 | 9 | – | 19 | .321 |
† 2004 Big Ten tournament winner Rankings from AP poll

2003–04 Big West men's basketball standings
| | Conf. | | | | Overall |
| Team | W | | L | PCT | W | | L | PCT |
|---|---|---|---|---|---|---|---|---|
| No. 25 Utah State | 17 | – | 1 | .944 | 25 | – | 4 | .862 |
| Pacific † | 17 | – | 1 | .944 | 25 | – | 8 | .758 |
| UC Santa Barbara | 10 | – | 8 | .556 | 16 | – | 12 | .571 |
| Idaho | 9 | – | 9 | .500 | 14 | – | 16 | .467 |
| UC Riverside | 7 | – | 11 | .389 | 11 | – | 17 | .393 |
| Cal State Northridge | 7 | – | 11 | .389 | 14 | – | 16 | .467 |
| Cal State Fullerton | 7 | – | 11 | .389 | 11 | – | 17 | .393 |
| Cal Poly | 6 | – | 12 | .333 | 11 | – | 16 | .407 |
| UC Irvine | 6 | – | 12 | .333 | 11 | – | 17 | .393 |
| Long Beach State | 4 | – | 14 | .222 | 6 | – | 21 | .222 |
† 2004 Big West tournament winner As of April 10, 2004; Rankings from AP poll

2003–04 CAA men's basketball standings
| | Conf. | | | | Overall |
| Team | W | | L | PCT | W | | L | PCT |
|---|---|---|---|---|---|---|---|---|
| VCU † | 14 | – | 4 | .778 | 23 | – | 8 | .742 |
| Drexel | 13 | – | 5 | .722 | 18 | – | 11 | .621 |
| George Mason | 12 | – | 6 | .667 | 23 | – | 10 | .697 |
| Old Dominion | 11 | – | 7 | .611 | 17 | – | 12 | .586 |
| Delaware | 10 | – | 8 | .556 | 16 | – | 12 | .571 |
| Hofstra | 10 | – | 8 | .556 | 14 | – | 15 | .483 |
| UNC Wilmington | 9 | – | 9 | .500 | 15 | – | 15 | .500 |
| Towson | 4 | – | 14 | .222 | 8 | – | 21 | .276 |
| William & Mary | 4 | – | 14 | .222 | 7 | – | 21 | .250 |
| James Madison | 3 | – | 15 | .167 | 7 | – | 21 | .250 |
† 2004 CAA tournament winner Rankings from AP poll

2003–04 Conference USA men's basketball standings
| | Conf. | | | | Overall |
| Team | W | | L | PCT | W | | L | PCT |
|---|---|---|---|---|---|---|---|---|
| DePaul | 12 | – | 4 | .750 | 22 | – | 10 | .688 |
| No. 24 Memphis | 12 | – | 4 | .750 | 22 | – | 8 | .733 |
| No. 11 Cincinnati † | 12 | – | 4 | .750 | 25 | – | 7 | .781 |
| UAB | 12 | – | 4 | .750 | 22 | – | 10 | .688 |
| Charlotte | 12 | – | 4 | .750 | 21 | – | 9 | .700 |
| Louisville | 9 | – | 7 | .563 | 20 | – | 10 | .667 |
| Saint Louis | 9 | – | 7 | .563 | 19 | – | 13 | .594 |
| Marquette | 8 | – | 8 | .500 | 19 | – | 12 | .613 |
| TCU | 7 | – | 9 | .438 | 12 | – | 17 | .414 |
| Southern Miss | 6 | – | 10 | .375 | 13 | – | 15 | .464 |
| East Carolina | 5 | – | 11 | .313 | 13 | – | 14 | .481 |
| Tulane | 4 | – | 12 | .250 | 11 | – | 17 | .393 |
| Houston | 3 | – | 13 | .188 | 9 | – | 18 | .333 |
| South Florida | 1 | – | 15 | .063 | 7 | – | 20 | .259 |
† 2004 Conference USA Tournament winner Rankings from AP poll

2003–04 Horizon League men's basketball standings
| | Conf. | | | | Overall |
| Team | W | | L | PCT | W | | L | PCT |
|---|---|---|---|---|---|---|---|---|
| Milwaukee | 13 | – | 3 | .813 | 20 | – | 11 | .645 |
| Illinois-Chicago † | 12 | – | 4 | .750 | 24 | – | 8 | .750 |
| Green Bay | 11 | – | 5 | .688 | 17 | – | 11 | .607 |
| Detroit Mercy | 10 | – | 6 | .625 | 19 | – | 11 | .633 |
| Wright State | 10 | – | 6 | .625 | 14 | – | 14 | .500 |
| Butler | 8 | – | 8 | .500 | 16 | – | 14 | .533 |
| Youngstown State | 4 | – | 12 | .250 | 8 | – | 20 | .286 |
| Loyola Chicago | 4 | – | 12 | .250 | 9 | – | 20 | .310 |
| Cleveland State | 0 | – | 16 | .000 | 4 | – | 25 | .138 |
† 2004 Horizon League Tournament winner

2003–04 Ivy League men's basketball standings
| | Conf. | | | | Overall |
| Team | W | | L | PCT | W | | L | PCT |
|---|---|---|---|---|---|---|---|---|
| Princeton | 13 | – | 1 | .929 | 20 | – | 8 | .714 |
| Penn | 10 | – | 4 | .714 | 17 | – | 10 | .630 |
| Brown | 10 | – | 4 | .714 | 14 | – | 13 | .519 |
| Yale | 7 | – | 7 | .500 | 12 | – | 15 | .444 |
| Cornell | 6 | – | 8 | .429 | 11 | – | 16 | .407 |
| Columbia | 6 | – | 8 | .429 | 10 | – | 17 | .370 |
| Harvard | 3 | – | 11 | .214 | 4 | – | 23 | .148 |
| Dartmouth | 1 | – | 13 | .071 | 3 | – | 25 | .107 |
Rankings from AP Poll

2003–04 MAAC men's basketball standings
| | Conf. | | | | Overall |
| Team | W | | L | PCT | W | | L | PCT |
|---|---|---|---|---|---|---|---|---|
| Manhattan † | 16 | – | 2 | .889 | 25 | – | 6 | .806 |
| Niagara | 13 | – | 5 | .722 | 22 | – | 10 | .688 |
| Fairfield | 12 | – | 6 | .667 | 19 | – | 11 | .633 |
| Saint Peter's | 12 | – | 6 | .667 | 17 | – | 12 | .586 |
| Rider | 10 | – | 8 | .556 | 17 | – | 14 | .548 |
| Siena | 9 | – | 9 | .500 | 14 | – | 16 | .467 |
| Iona | 8 | – | 10 | .444 | 11 | – | 18 | .379 |
| Canisius | 5 | – | 13 | .278 | 10 | – | 20 | .333 |
| Marist | 4 | – | 14 | .222 | 6 | – | 22 | .214 |
| Loyola (MD) | 1 | – | 17 | .056 | 1 | – | 27 | .036 |
† 2004 MAAC tournament winner

2003–04 Mid-American Conference men's basketball standings
| | Conf. | | | | Overall |
| Team | W | | L | PCT | W | | L | PCT |
|---|---|---|---|---|---|---|---|---|
East
| Kent State | 13 | – | 5 | .722 | 22 | – | 9 | .710 |
| Miami (OH) | 12 | – | 6 | .667 | 18 | – | 11 | .621 |
| Buffalo | 11 | – | 7 | .611 | 17 | – | 12 | .586 |
| Marshall | 8 | – | 10 | .444 | 12 | – | 17 | .414 |
| Akron | 7 | – | 11 | .389 | 13 | – | 15 | .464 |
| Ohio | 7 | – | 11 | .389 | 10 | – | 20 | .333 |
West
| Western Michigan† | 15 | – | 3 | .833 | 26 | – | 5 | .839 |
| Toledo | 12 | – | 6 | .667 | 20 | – | 11 | .645 |
| Ball State | 10 | – | 8 | .556 | 14 | – | 15 | .483 |
| Bowling Green | 8 | – | 10 | .444 | 14 | – | 17 | .452 |
| Eastern Michigan | 7 | – | 11 | .389 | 13 | – | 15 | .464 |
| Northern Illinois | 5 | – | 13 | .278 | 10 | – | 20 | .333 |
| Central Michigan | 2 | – | 16 | .111 | 6 | – | 24 | .200 |
† 2004 MAC tournament winner Rankings from AP Poll

2003–04 Mid-Continent Conference men's basketball standings
| | Conf. | | | | Overall |
| Team | W | | L | PCT | W | | L | PCT |
|---|---|---|---|---|---|---|---|---|
| Valparaiso † | 11 | – | 5 | .688 | 18 | – | 13 | .581 |
| IUPUI | 10 | – | 6 | .625 | 21 | – | 11 | .656 |
| Centenary | 10 | – | 6 | .625 | 16 | – | 12 | .571 |
| Oral Roberts | 10 | – | 6 | .625 | 17 | – | 11 | .607 |
| UMKC | 9 | – | 7 | .563 | 15 | – | 14 | .517 |
| Chicago State | 9 | – | 7 | .563 | 12 | – | 20 | .375 |
| Southern Utah | 6 | – | 10 | .375 | 10 | – | 18 | .357 |
| Oakland | 6 | – | 10 | .375 | 13 | – | 17 | .433 |
| Western Illinois | 1 | – | 15 | .063 | 3 | – | 25 | .107 |
† 2004 Mid-Con Tournament winner Rankings from AP Poll

2003–04 MEAC men's basketball standings
| | Conf. | | | | Overall |
| Team | W | | L | PCT | W | | L | PCT |
|---|---|---|---|---|---|---|---|---|
| South Carolina State | 14 | – | 4 | .778 | 18 | – | 11 | .621 |
| Coppin State | 14 | – | 4 | .778 | 18 | – | 14 | .563 |
| Delaware State | 11 | – | 7 | .611 | 13 | – | 15 | .464 |
| Hampton | 11 | – | 7 | .611 | 13 | – | 17 | .433 |
| Florida A&M † | 10 | – | 8 | .556 | 15 | – | 17 | .469 |
| Norfolk State | 10 | – | 8 | .556 | 12 | – | 17 | .414 |
| Morgan State | 9 | – | 9 | .500 | 11 | – | 16 | .407 |
| Bethune–Cookman | 7 | – | 11 | .389 | 8 | – | 21 | .276 |
| Maryland Eastern Shore | 6 | – | 12 | .333 | 8 | – | 21 | .276 |
| Howard | 4 | – | 14 | .222 | 6 | – | 22 | .214 |
| North Carolina A&T | 3 | – | 15 | .167 | 3 | – | 25 | .107 |
† 2004 MEAC tournament winner Rankings from AP Poll

2003–04 Missouri Valley Conference men's basketball standings
| | Conf. | | | | Overall |
| Team | W | | L | PCT | W | | L | PCT |
|---|---|---|---|---|---|---|---|---|
| No. 23 Southern Illinois | 17 | – | 1 | .944 | 25 | – | 5 | .833 |
| Northern Iowa † | 12 | – | 6 | .667 | 21 | – | 10 | .677 |
| Wichita State | 12 | – | 6 | .667 | 21 | – | 11 | .656 |
| Creighton | 12 | – | 6 | .667 | 20 | – | 9 | .690 |
| Southwest Missouri State | 9 | – | 9 | .500 | 19 | – | 14 | .576 |
| Drake | 7 | – | 11 | .389 | 12 | – | 16 | .429 |
| Bradley | 7 | – | 11 | .389 | 15 | – | 16 | .484 |
| Indiana State | 5 | – | 13 | .278 | 9 | – | 19 | .321 |
| Evansville | 5 | – | 13 | .278 | 7 | – | 22 | .241 |
| Illinois State | 4 | – | 14 | .222 | 10 | – | 19 | .345 |
† 2004 Missouri Valley Tournament winner Rankings from AP Poll

2003–04 Mountain West Conference men's basketball standings
| | Conf. | | | | Overall |
| Team | W | | L | PCT | W | | L | PCT |
|---|---|---|---|---|---|---|---|---|
| Air Force | 12 | – | 2 | .857 | 22 | – | 7 | .759 |
| BYU | 10 | – | 4 | .714 | 21 | – | 9 | .700 |
| Utah † | 9 | – | 5 | .643 | 24 | – | 9 | .727 |
| UNLV | 7 | – | 7 | .500 | 18 | – | 13 | .581 |
| New Mexico | 5 | – | 9 | .357 | 14 | – | 14 | .500 |
| San Diego State | 5 | – | 9 | .357 | 14 | – | 16 | .467 |
| Wyoming | 4 | – | 10 | .286 | 11 | – | 17 | .393 |
| Colorado State | 4 | – | 10 | .286 | 13 | – | 16 | .448 |
† 2004 Mountain West tournament winner Rankings from AP Poll

2003–04 Northeast Conference men's basketball standings
| | Conf. | | | | Overall |
| Team | W | | L | PCT | W | | L | PCT |
|---|---|---|---|---|---|---|---|---|
| Monmouth † | 12 | – | 6 | .667 | 21 | – | 12 | .636 |
| St. Francis (NY) | 12 | – | 6 | .667 | 15 | – | 13 | .536 |
| Fairleigh Dickinson | 11 | – | 7 | .611 | 17 | – | 12 | .586 |
| Robert Morris | 10 | – | 8 | .556 | 14 | – | 15 | .483 |
| Saint Francis (PA) | 10 | – | 8 | .556 | 13 | – | 15 | .464 |
| Wagner | 10 | – | 8 | .556 | 13 | – | 16 | .448 |
| Central Connecticut | 9 | – | 9 | .500 | 14 | – | 14 | .500 |
| Mount St. Mary's | 8 | – | 10 | .444 | 10 | – | 19 | .345 |
| Sacred Heart | 8 | – | 10 | .444 | 12 | – | 15 | .444 |
| Quinnipiac | 5 | – | 13 | .278 | 9 | – | 20 | .310 |
| Long Island | 4 | – | 14 | .222 | 8 | – | 19 | .296 |
† 2004 NEC tournament winner

2003–04 Ohio Valley Conference men's basketball standings
| | Conf. | | | | Overall |
| Team | W | | L | PCT | W | | L | PCT |
|---|---|---|---|---|---|---|---|---|
| Austin Peay | 16 | – | 0 | 1.000 | 22 | – | 10 | .688 |
| Murray State † | 14 | – | 2 | .875 | 28 | – | 6 | .824 |
| Morehead State | 10 | – | 6 | .625 | 16 | – | 13 | .552 |
| Eastern Kentucky | 8 | – | 8 | .500 | 14 | – | 15 | .483 |
| Samford | 7 | – | 9 | .438 | 12 | – | 16 | .429 |
| Jacksonville State | 7 | – | 9 | .438 | 14 | – | 14 | .500 |
| Tennessee Tech | 7 | – | 9 | .438 | 13 | – | 15 | .464 |
| Tennessee State | 6 | – | 10 | .375 | 7 | – | 21 | .250 |
| UT Martin | 5 | – | 11 | .313 | 10 | – | 18 | .357 |
| Eastern Illinois | 4 | – | 12 | .250 | 6 | – | 21 | .222 |
| Southeast Missouri State | 4 | – | 12 | .250 | 11 | – | 16 | .407 |
† 2004 OVC tournament winner Rankings from AP Poll

2003–04 Pacific-10 Conference men's basketball standings
| | Conf. | | | | Overall |
| Team | W | | L | PCT | W | | L | PCT |
|---|---|---|---|---|---|---|---|---|
| No. 6 Stanford† | 17 | – | 1 | .944 | 30 | – | 2 | .938 |
| Washington | 12 | – | 6 | .667 | 19 | – | 12 | .613 |
| Arizona | 11 | – | 7 | .611 | 20 | – | 10 | .667 |
| Oregon | 9 | – | 9 | .500 | 18 | – | 13 | .581 |
| California | 9 | – | 9 | .500 | 13 | – | 15 | .464 |
| USC | 8 | – | 10 | .444 | 13 | – | 15 | .464 |
| Washington State | 7 | – | 11 | .389 | 13 | – | 16 | .448 |
| UCLA | 7 | – | 11 | .389 | 11 | – | 17 | .393 |
| Oregon State | 6 | – | 12 | .333 | 12 | – | 16 | .429 |
| Arizona State | 4 | – | 14 | .222 | 10 | – | 17 | .370 |
† Conference tournament winner As of April 4, 2004; Rankings from Coaches Poll

2003–04 Patriot League men's basketball standings
| | Conf. | | | | Overall |
| Team | W | | L | PCT | W | | L | PCT |
|---|---|---|---|---|---|---|---|---|
| Lehigh † | 10 | – | 4 | .714 | 20 | – | 11 | .645 |
| American | 10 | – | 4 | .714 | 18 | – | 13 | .581 |
| Lafayette | 9 | – | 5 | .643 | 18 | – | 10 | .643 |
| Bucknell | 9 | – | 5 | .643 | 14 | – | 15 | .483 |
| Holy Cross | 7 | – | 7 | .500 | 13 | – | 15 | .464 |
| Colgate | 6 | – | 8 | .429 | 15 | – | 14 | .517 |
| Army | 3 | – | 11 | .214 | 6 | – | 21 | .222 |
| Navy | 2 | – | 12 | .143 | 5 | – | 23 | .179 |
† 2004 Patriot League tournament winner

2003–04 Southeastern Conference men's basketball standings
| | Conf. | | | | Overall |
| Team | W | | L | PCT | W | | L | PCT |
|---|---|---|---|---|---|---|---|---|
East
| No. 2 Kentucky † | 13 | – | 3 | .813 | 27 | – | 5 | .844 |
| Florida | 9 | – | 7 | .563 | 20 | – | 11 | .645 |
| No. 23 South Carolina | 8 | – | 8 | .500 | 23 | – | 11 | .676 |
| Vanderbilt | 8 | – | 8 | .500 | 23 | – | 10 | .697 |
| Georgia | 7 | – | 9 | .438 | 16 | – | 14 | .533 |
| Tennessee | 7 | – | 9 | .438 | 15 | – | 14 | .517 |
West
| No. 8 Mississippi State | 14 | – | 2 | .875 | 26 | – | 4 | .867 |
| LSU | 8 | – | 8 | .500 | 18 | – | 11 | .621 |
| Alabama | 8 | – | 8 | .500 | 20 | – | 13 | .606 |
| Auburn | 5 | – | 11 | .313 | 14 | – | 14 | .500 |
| Ole Miss | 5 | – | 11 | .313 | 13 | – | 15 | .464 |
| Arkansas | 4 | – | 12 | .250 | 12 | – | 16 | .429 |
† 2004 SEC tournament winner Rankings from AP Poll

2003–04 Southern Conference men's basketball standings
| | Conf. | | | | Overall |
| Team | W | | L | PCT | W | | L | PCT |
|---|---|---|---|---|---|---|---|---|
North
| East Tennessee State † | 15 | – | 1 | .938 | 27 | – | 6 | .818 |
| Chattanooga | 10 | – | 6 | .625 | 19 | – | 11 | .633 |
| Elon | 7 | – | 9 | .438 | 12 | – | 18 | .400 |
| UNC Greensboro | 7 | – | 9 | .438 | 11 | – | 17 | .393 |
| Western Carolina | 6 | – | 10 | .375 | 13 | – | 15 | .464 |
| Appalachian State | 4 | – | 12 | .250 | 9 | – | 21 | .300 |
South
| Georgia Southern | 11 | – | 5 | .688 | 21 | – | 8 | .724 |
| College of Charleston | 11 | – | 5 | .688 | 20 | – | 9 | .690 |
| Davidson | 11 | – | 5 | .688 | 17 | – | 12 | .586 |
| Furman | 8 | – | 8 | .500 | 17 | – | 12 | .586 |
| Wofford | 4 | – | 12 | .250 | 9 | – | 20 | .310 |
| The Citadel | 2 | – | 14 | .125 | 6 | – | 22 | .214 |
† SoCon Tournament winner As of April 30, 2004; Rankings from AP poll

2003–04 Southland Conference men's basketball standings
| | Conf. | | | | Overall |
| Team | W | | L | PCT | W | | L | PCT |
|---|---|---|---|---|---|---|---|---|
| Southeastern Louisiana | 11 | – | 5 | .688 | 20 | – | 9 | .690 |
| Texas–Arlington | 11 | – | 5 | .688 | 17 | – | 12 | .586 |
| UTSA † | 11 | – | 5 | .688 | 19 | – | 14 | .576 |
| Stephen F. Austin | 10 | – | 6 | .625 | 21 | – | 9 | .700 |
| Sam Houston State | 8 | – | 8 | .500 | 13 | – | 15 | .464 |
| Texas State | 8 | – | 8 | .500 | 13 | – | 15 | .464 |
| Northwestern State | 8 | – | 8 | .500 | 11 | – | 17 | .393 |
| Louisiana–Monroe | 8 | – | 8 | .500 | 12 | – | 19 | .387 |
| McNeese State | 7 | – | 9 | .438 | 11 | – | 16 | .407 |
| Lamar | 5 | – | 11 | .313 | 11 | – | 18 | .379 |
| Nicholls State | 1 | – | 15 | .063 | 6 | – | 21 | .222 |
† 2004 Southland tournament winner

2003–04 SWAC men's basketball standings
| | Conf. | | | | Overall |
| Team | W | | L | PCT | W | | L | PCT |
|---|---|---|---|---|---|---|---|---|
| Mississippi Valley State | 16 | – | 2 | .889 | 22 | – | 7 | .759 |
| Alabama State † | 11 | – | 7 | .611 | 16 | – | 15 | .516 |
| Texas Southern | 10 | – | 8 | .556 | 14 | – | 15 | .483 |
| Alabama A&M | 9 | – | 9 | .500 | 13 | – | 17 | .433 |
| Jackson State | 9 | – | 9 | .500 | 12 | – | 17 | .414 |
| Alcorn State | 9 | – | 9 | .500 | 11 | – | 18 | .379 |
| Grambling State | 9 | – | 9 | .500 | 11 | – | 18 | .379 |
| Southern | 9 | – | 9 | .500 | 12 | – | 16 | .429 |
| Prairie View A&M | 7 | – | 11 | .389 | 7 | – | 20 | .259 |
| Arkansas–Pine Bluff | 1 | – | 17 | .056 | 1 | – | 26 | .037 |
† 2004 SWAC tournament winner Rankings from AP Poll

2003–04 Sun Belt Conference men's basketball standings
| | Conf. | | | | Overall |
| Team | W | | L | PCT | W | | L | PCT |
|---|---|---|---|---|---|---|---|---|
East
| Arkansas-Little Rock | 9 | – | 5 | .643 | 17 | – | 12 | .586 |
| Western Kentucky | 8 | – | 6 | .571 | 15 | – | 13 | .536 |
| Middle Tennessee | 8 | – | 6 | .571 | 17 | – | 12 | .586 |
| Arkansas State | 7 | – | 7 | .500 | 17 | – | 11 | .607 |
| Florida International | 1 | – | 13 | .071 | 5 | – | 22 | .185 |
West
| Louisiana–Lafayette † | 12 | – | 3 | .800 | 20 | – | 9 | .690 |
| New Orleans | 9 | – | 6 | .600 | 17 | – | 14 | .548 |
| North Texas | 8 | – | 7 | .533 | 13 | – | 15 | .464 |
| South Alabama | 6 | – | 9 | .400 | 12 | – | 16 | .429 |
| Denver | 6 | – | 9 | .400 | 14 | – | 13 | .519 |
| New Mexico State | 6 | – | 9 | .400 | 13 | – | 14 | .481 |
† 2004 Sun Belt Conference tournament winner Rankings from AP poll

2003–04 West Coast Conference men's basketball standings
| | Conf. | | | | Overall |
| Team | W | | L | PCT | W | | L | PCT |
|---|---|---|---|---|---|---|---|---|
| No. 3 Gonzaga | 14 | – | 0 | 1.000 | 28 | – | 3 | .903 |
| Saint Mary's | 9 | – | 5 | .643 | 19 | – | 12 | .613 |
| Pepperdine | 9 | – | 5 | .643 | 15 | – | 16 | .484 |
| San Francisco | 7 | – | 7 | .500 | 17 | – | 14 | .548 |
| Santa Clara | 6 | – | 8 | .429 | 16 | – | 16 | .500 |
| Portland | 5 | – | 9 | .357 | 11 | – | 17 | .393 |
| Loyola Marymount | 5 | – | 9 | .357 | 15 | – | 14 | .517 |
| San Diego | 1 | – | 13 | .071 | 4 | – | 26 | .133 |
† 2004 WCC tournament winner Rankings from AP Poll

2003–04 WAC men's basketball standings
| | Conf. | | | | Overall |
| Team | W | | L | PCT | W | | L | PCT |
|---|---|---|---|---|---|---|---|---|
| Nevada † | 13 | – | 5 | .722 | 25 | – | 9 | .735 |
| UTEP | 13 | – | 5 | .722 | 24 | – | 8 | .750 |
| Boise State | 12 | – | 6 | .667 | 23 | – | 10 | .697 |
| Rice | 12 | – | 6 | .667 | 22 | – | 11 | .667 |
| Hawaii | 11 | – | 7 | .611 | 21 | – | 12 | .636 |
| Fresno State | 10 | – | 8 | .556 | 14 | – | 15 | .483 |
| Louisiana Tech | 8 | – | 10 | .444 | 15 | – | 15 | .500 |
| SMU | 5 | – | 13 | .278 | 12 | – | 18 | .400 |
| Tulsa | 5 | – | 13 | .278 | 9 | – | 20 | .310 |
| San Jose State | 1 | – | 17 | .056 | 6 | – | 23 | .207 |
† 2004 WAC tournament winner

=== Division I independents ===
Five schools played as Division I independents.

2003–04 NCAA Division I men's basketball independents standings
| | Conf. | | | | Overall |
| Team | W | | L | PCT | W | | L | PCT |
|---|---|---|---|---|---|---|---|---|
| Utah Valley | - | – | - | – | 23 | – | 5 | .821 |
| Texas A&M–Corpus Christi | - | – | - | – | 15 | – | 11 | .577 |
| Texas–Pan American | - | – | - | – | 14 | – | 14 | .500 |
| Savannah State | - | – | - | – | 4 | – | 24 | .143 |
| IPFW | - | – | - | – | 3 | – | 25 | .107 |
Rankings from AP Poll

=== Informal championships ===
| Conference | Regular season winner | Most Valuable Player |
|---|---|---|
| Philadelphia Big 5 | Saint Joseph's | Jameer Nelson, Saint Joseph's |

Saint Joseph's finished with a 4–0 record in head-to-head competition among the Philadelphia Big 5.

=== Statistical leaders ===
Source for additional stats categories

| Points per game | | | Rebounds per game | | | Assists per game | | | Steals per game | | |
| Player | School | PPG | Player | School | RPG | Player | School | APG | Player | School | SPG |
| Keydren Clark | St. Peter's | 26.7 | Paul Millsap | LA Tech | 12.5 | Greg Davis | Troy | 8.3 | Marques Green | St. Bonaventure | 4.0 |
| Kevin Martin | W. Carolina | 24.9 | Jaime Lloreda | LSU | 11.6 | Martell Bailey | Illinois-Chicago | 7.8 | Obie Trotter | Alabama A&M | 3.0 |
| David Hawkins | Temple | 24.4 | Emeka Okafor | UConn | 11.5 | Aaron Miles | Kansas | 7.3 | Chakowby Hicks | Norfolk St. | 3.0 |
| Taylor Coppenrath | Vermont | 24.1 | Nate Lofton | SE Louisiana | 10.9 | Andrés Rodríguez | American | 7.3 | Zakee Wadood | E. Tennessee St. | 2.8 |
| Luis Flores | Manhattan | 24.0 | Nigel Wyatte | Wagner | 10.4 | Raymond Felton | N. Carolina | 7.1 | Jameer Nelson | St. Joseph's | 2.8 |

| Blocked shots per game | | | Field-goal percentage | | | Three-Point FG percentage | | | Free-throw percentage | | |
| Player | School | BPG | Player | School | FG% | Player | School | 3FG% | Player | School | FT% |
| Anwar Ferguson | Houston | 4.1 | Nigel Dixon | W. Kentucky | 67.8 | Brad Lechtenberg | San Diego | 51.1 | Blake Ahearn | Missouri St. | 97.5 |
| Emeka Okafor | UConn | 4.1 | Sean Finn | Dayton | 66.3 | James Odoms | Mercer | 48.8 | JJ Redick | Duke | 95.3 |
| D'or Fischer | West Virginia | 4.0 | Adam Mark | Belmont | 66.2 | Tyson Dorsey | Samford | 48.7 | Jake Sullivan | Iowa St. | 93.3 |
| Gerrick Morris | S. Florida | 4.0 | David Harrison | Colorado | 63.1 | Antonio Burks | Stephen F. Austin | 47.6 | Steve Drabyn | Belmont | 91.4 |
| Nick Billings | Binghamton | 3.5 | Cuthbert Victor | Murray St. | 62.9 | Trey Guidry | Illinois St. | 46.0 | Chris Hernandez | Stanford | 91.4 |

== Postseason tournaments ==
=== NCAA tournament ===
==== Final Four – Alamodome, San Antonio, Texas ====
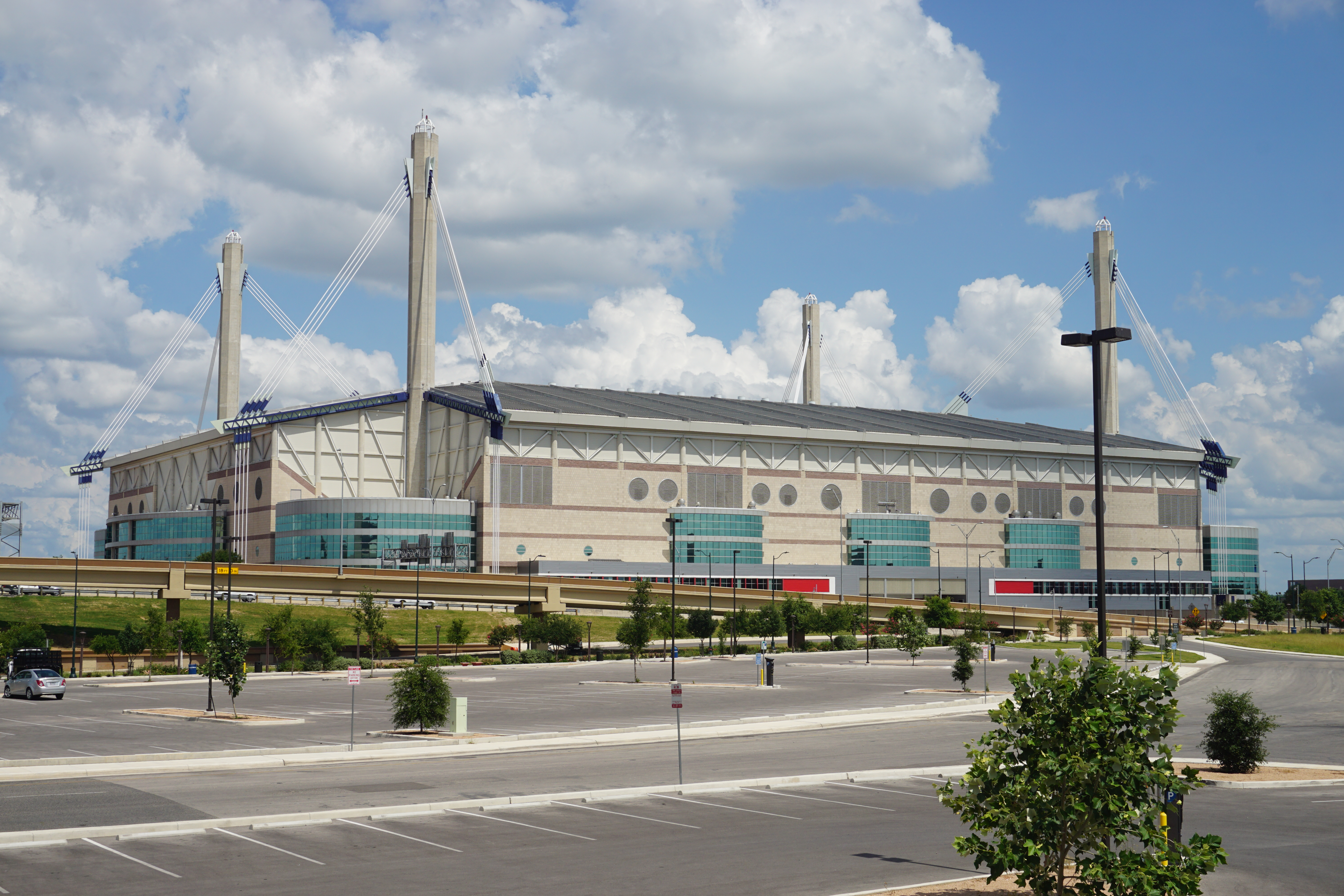
The Alamodome in San Antonio, Texas, hosted the NCAA men's Final Four.

National semifinals
E2 | Oklahoma State | 65
M3 | Georgia Tech | 67
S1 | Duke | 78
W2 | Connecticut | 79

National championship
M3 | Georgia Tech | 73
W2 | Connecticut | 82

=== Semifinals & finals ===
Semifinals
Rutgers | 84
Iowa State | 81
Oregon | 53
Michigan | 78

Finals
Rutgers | 55
Michigan | 62

== Award winners ==
=== Consensus All-American teams ===
Consensus First Team
| Player | Position | Class | Team |
|---|---|---|---|
| Emeka Okafor | C | Junior | Connecticut |
| Jameer Nelson | G | Senior | St. Joseph's |
| Lawrence Roberts | F | Junior | Mississippi State |
| Andre Emmett | G | Senior | Texas Tech |
| Ryan Gomes | F | Junior | Providence |

Consensus Second Team
| Player | Position | Class | Team |
|---|---|---|---|
| Devin Harris | G | Junior | Wisconsin |
| Julius Hodge | F | Junior | North Carolina State |
| Luke Jackson | F | Senior | Oregon |
| Josh Childress | G | Junior | Stanford |
| Blake Stepp | G | Senior | Gonzaga |

=== Major player of the year awards ===
- Wooden Award: Jameer Nelson, St. Joseph's
- Naismith Award: Jameer Nelson, St. Joseph's
- Associated Press Player of the Year: Jameer Nelson, St. Joseph's
- NABC Co-Player of the Year: Jameer Nelson, St. Joseph's & Emeka Okafor, Connecticut
- Oscar Robertson Trophy (USBWA): Jameer Nelson, St. Joseph's
- Adolph Rupp Trophy: Jameer Nelson, St. Joseph's
- CBS/Chevrolet Player of the Year: Jameer Nelson, St. Joseph's
- Sporting News Player of the Year: Jameer Nelson, St. Joseph's

=== Major freshman of the year awards ===
- USBWA Freshman of the Year: Luol Deng, Duke
- Sporting News Freshman of the Year: Chris Paul, Wake Forest

=== Major coach of the year awards ===
- Associated Press Coach of the Year: Phil Martelli, St. Joseph's
- Henry Iba Award (USBWA): Phil Martelli, St. Joseph's
- NABC Coach of the Year: Phil Martelli, St. Joseph's & Mike Montgomery, Stanford
- Naismith College Coach of the Year: Phil Martelli, St. Joseph's
- CBS/Chevrolet Coach of the Year: Phil Martelli, St. Joseph's
- Adolph Rupp Cup: Phil Martelli, St. Joseph's
- Sporting News Coach of the Year: Mike Montgomery, Stanford

=== Other major awards ===
- Bob Cousy Award (Best point guard): Jameer Nelson, St. Joseph's
- Pete Newell Big Man Award (Best big man): Emeka Okafor, Connecticut
- NABC Defensive Player of the Year: Emeka Okafor, Connecticut
- Frances Pomeroy Naismith Award (Best player under 6'0): Jameer Nelson, St. Joseph's
- Lowe's Senior CLASS Award (top senior): Jameer Nelson, St. Joseph's
- Robert V. Geasey Trophy (Top player in Philadelphia Big 5): Jameer Nelson, St. Joseph's
- NIT/Haggerty Award (Top player in New York City metro area): Andre Barrett, Seton Hall, and Luis Flores, Manhattan
- Chip Hilton Player of the Year Award (Strong personal character): Emeka Okafor, UConn

== Coaching changes ==
A number of teams changed coaches throughout the season and after the season ended.

| Team | Former Coach | Interim Coach | New Coach | Reason |
|---|---|---|---|---|
| Air Force | Joe Scott | | Chris Mooney | |
| Akron | Dan Hipsher | | Keith Dambrot | |
| Auburn | Cliff Ellis | | Jeff Lebo | |
| Chattanooga | Jeff Lebo | | John Shulman | |
| Dartmouth | Dave Faucher | | Terry Dunn | |
| Eastern Washington | Ray Giacoletti | | Mike Burns | |
| Florida International | Donnie Marsh | | Sergio Rouco | |
| Georgetown | Craig Esherick | | John Thompson III | Esherick was fired on March 16, 2004, after 5 1/2 years as head coach. |
| Houston | Ray McCallum | | Tom Penders | |
| James Madison | Sherman Dillard | | Dean Keener | |
| Louisiana-Lafayette | Jessie Evans | | Robert Lee | |
| La Salle | Billy Hahn | | John Giannini | Hahn resigned following rape allegations against two of his players. |
| Loyola (MD) | Scott Hicks | | Jimmy Patsos | |
| Loyola (IL) | Larry Farmer | | Jim Whitesell | |
| Maine | John Giannini | | Ted Woodward | |
| Marist | Dave Magarity | | Matt Brady | |
| UMBC | Tom Sullivan | | Randy Monroe | |
| Maryland-Eastern Shore | Thomas Trotter | | Larry Lessett | |
| Miami (FL) | Perry Clark | | Frank Haith | |
| Montana | Pat Kennedy | | Larry Krystkowiak | Montana hired Grizzlies' all-time leading scorer & Idaho Stampede head coach Krystkowiak. |
| Navy | Don DeVoe | | Billy Lange | |
| Nevada | Trent Johnson | | Mark Fox | Nevada promoted top assistant Fox after Johnson left for Stanford. |
| Ohio State | Jim O'Brien | | Thad Matta | O'Brien was fired after recruiting violations involving Aleksandar Radojević surfaced. |
| Princeton | John Thompson III | | Joe Scott | Thompson left to become head coach at Georgetown. |
| San Francisco | Philip Mathews | | Jessie Evans | |
| Southern Illinois | Matt Painter | | Chris Lowery | Painter left to be top assistant at his alma mater, Purdue. |
| Southern Methodist | Mike Dement | Robert Lineburg | Jimmy Tubbs | SMU fired Dement with three games left in the regular-season. |
| Southern Miss | James Green | | Larry Eustachy | |
| St. John's | Mike Jarvis | Kevin Clark | Norm Roberts | |
| Stanford | Mike Montgomery | | Trent Johnson | Montgomery left to become head coach of the Golden State Warriors. |
| Texas A&M | Melvin Watkins | | Billy Gillispie | |
| Texas-Pan American | Bob Hoffman | | Robert Davenport | |
| Towson | Michael Hunt | | Pat Kennedy | |
| Utah | Rick Majerus | | Ray Giacoletti | |
| UNLV | Charlie Spoonhour | | Lon Kruger | |
| UTEP | Billy Gillispie | | Doc Sadler | |
| Xavier | Thad Matta | | Sean Miller | |
