= 2004 Conference USA men's basketball tournament =

- Classification: Division I
- Season: 2003–04
- Teams: 12
- Site: U.S. Bank Arena; Cincinnati, OH
- Champions: Cincinnati (4th title)
- Winning coach: Bob Huggins (4th title)
- MVP: Tony Bobbitt (Cincinnati)

2003–04 Conference USA men's basketball standings
	Conf.				Overall
Team	W		L	PCT	W		L	PCT
DePaul	12	–	4	.750	22	–	10	.688
No. 24 Memphis	12	–	4	.750	22	–	8	.733
No. 11 Cincinnati †	12	–	4	.750	25	–	7	.781
UAB	12	–	4	.750	22	–	10	.688
Charlotte	12	–	4	.750	21	–	9	.700
Louisville	9	–	7	.563	20	–	10	.667
Saint Louis	9	–	7	.563	19	–	13	.594
Marquette	8	–	8	.500	19	–	12	.613
TCU	7	–	9	.438	12	–	17	.414
Southern Miss	6	–	10	.375	13	–	15	.464
East Carolina	5	–	11	.313	13	–	14	.481
Tulane	4	–	12	.250	11	–	17	.393
Houston	3	–	13	.188	9	–	18	.333
South Florida	1	–	15	.063	7	–	20	.259
† 2004 Conference USA Tournament winner Rankings from AP poll

The 2004 Conference USA men's basketball tournament was held March 10–13 at the U.S. Bank Arena in Cincinnati, Ohio.

Hosts Cincinnati defeated top-seeded DePaul in the championship game, 55–50, to clinch their fourth Conference USA men's tournament championship.

The Bearcats, in turn, received an automatic bid to the 2004 NCAA tournament. They were joined in the tournament by fellow C-USA members UAB, Charlotte, DePaul, Louisville, and Memphis, all of whom earned at-large bids.

== Format ==
There were no changes to the tournament format from the previous year.

The top four teams were given byes into the quarterfinal round while the next eight teams were placed into the first round. The two teams with the worst conference records were not invited to the tournament. All remaining tournament seeds were determined by regular season conference records.

== Bracket ==
First round Wednesday, March 10
9	TCU	64
8	Marquette	62
5	Charlotte	78
12	Tulane	48
11	East Carolina	54
6	Louisville	61
7	Saint Louis	52
10	Southern Miss	46

Quarterfinals; Thursday, March 11
1	DePaul	89
9	TCU	65
5	Charlotte	66
4	UAB	77
3	#13 Cincinnati	64
6	Louisville	62
7	Saint Louis	72
2	#23 Memphis	61

Semifinals; Friday, March 12
1	DePaul	75
4	UAB	74
3	#13 Cincinnati	66
7	Saint Louis	46

Championship; Saturday, March 13
1	DePaul	50
3	#13 Cincinnati	55
