= 2003–04 Charlotte 49ers men's basketball team =

American college basketball season

2003–04 Charlotte 49ers men's basketball

Conference USA Regular season co-champions

NCAA tournament, First Round
- Conference: Conference USA
- Record: 21–9 (12–4 C-USA)
- Head coach: Bobby Lutz (6th season)
- Assistant coach: Benny Moss (4th season)
- Home arena: Dale F. Halton Arena

2003–04 Conference USA men's basketball standings
	Conf.				Overall
Team	W		L	PCT	W		L	PCT
DePaul	12	–	4	.750	22	–	10	.688
No. 24 Memphis	12	–	4	.750	22	–	8	.733
No. 11 Cincinnati †	12	–	4	.750	25	–	7	.781
UAB	12	–	4	.750	22	–	10	.688
Charlotte	12	–	4	.750	21	–	9	.700
Louisville	9	–	7	.563	20	–	10	.667
Saint Louis	9	–	7	.563	19	–	13	.594
Marquette	8	–	8	.500	19	–	12	.613
TCU	7	–	9	.438	12	–	17	.414
Southern Miss	6	–	10	.375	13	–	15	.464
East Carolina	5	–	11	.313	13	–	14	.481
Tulane	4	–	12	.250	11	–	17	.393
Houston	3	–	13	.188	9	–	18	.333
South Florida	1	–	15	.063	7	–	20	.259
† 2004 Conference USA Tournament winner Rankings from AP poll

The 2003–04 UNC Charlotte 49ers men's basketball team represented the University of North Carolina at Charlotte in the 1998–99 college basketball season. This was head coach Bobby Lutz's sixth season at the school. The 49ers competed in Conference USA and played their home games at Dale F. Halton Arena. They finished the season 21–9 (12–4 in C-USA play) and received an at-large bid to the 2004 NCAA tournament as No. 9 seed in the East region. The 49ers were defeated by No. 8 seed Texas Tech, 76–73, in the opening round.

== Roster ==
2003–04 Charlotte 49ers men's basketball team
Players
Coaches

Pos.	#	Name	Height	Weight	Year	Hometown
F	3	Curtis Withers	6 ft 8 in (2.03 m)	245 lb (111 kg)	So	Charlotte, North Carolina
G	13	Eddie Basden	6 ft 5 in (1.96 m)	215 lb (98 kg)	Jr	Greenbelt, Maryland

Head coach

- Bobby Lutz

Assistant coach(es)

- Benny Moss (Pfeiffer)

Legend

- (C) Team captain
- (S) Suspended
- (I) Ineligible
- (W) Walk-on
- Injured
- Current redshirt

Roster

== Schedule and results ==
Date time, TV	Rank^{#}	Opponent^{#}	Result	Record	Site city, state
Regular season
Nov 26, 2003*		at No. 7 Syracuse	W 96–92	2–1	Carrier Dome; Syracuse, New York
Dec 3, 2003*		at Alabama	L 72–79	3–2	Coleman Coliseum; Tuscaloosa, Alabama
Jan 2, 2004*		at Southern Illinois	W 64–59	8–3	SIU Arena; Carbondale, Illinois
Mar 6, 2004		Tulane	W 79–65	20–7 (12–4)	Dale F. Halton Arena; Charlotte, North Carolina
C-USA tournament
Mar 10, 2004*		vs. Tulane; First round	W 78–48	21–7	Riverfront Coliseum; Cincinnati, Ohio
Mar 11, 2004*		vs. UAB; Quarterfinals	L 66–77	21–8	Riverfront Coliseum; Cincinnati, Ohio
NCAA tournament
Mar 18, 2004*	(9 E)	vs. (8 E) Texas Tech; First round	L 73–76	21–9	HSBC Arena; Buffalo, New York
*Non-conference game. ^{#}Rankings from AP poll. (#) Tournament seedings in parentheses. E=East.
