= 2003–04 Memphis Tigers men's basketball team =

American college basketball season

2003–04 Memphis Tigers men's basketball

C-USA Regular season co-champions

NCAA tournament, second round
- Conference: Conference USA

Ranking
- AP: No. 24
- Record: 22–8 (12–4 C-USA)
- Head coach: John Calipari (4th season)
- Assistant coaches: Tony Barbee; Derek Kellogg; John Robic
- Home arena: Pyramid Arena

2003–04 Conference USA men's basketball standings
	Conf.				Overall
Team	W		L	PCT	W		L	PCT
DePaul	12	–	4	.750	22	–	10	.688
No. 24 Memphis	12	–	4	.750	22	–	8	.733
No. 11 Cincinnati †	12	–	4	.750	25	–	7	.781
UAB	12	–	4	.750	22	–	10	.688
Charlotte	12	–	4	.750	21	–	9	.700
Louisville	9	–	7	.563	20	–	10	.667
Saint Louis	9	–	7	.563	19	–	13	.594
Marquette	8	–	8	.500	19	–	12	.613
TCU	7	–	9	.438	12	–	17	.414
Southern Miss	6	–	10	.375	13	–	15	.464
East Carolina	5	–	11	.313	13	–	14	.481
Tulane	4	–	12	.250	11	–	17	.393
Houston	3	–	13	.188	9	–	18	.333
South Florida	1	–	15	.063	7	–	20	.259
† 2004 Conference USA Tournament winner Rankings from AP poll

The 2003–04 Memphis Tigers men's basketball team represented the University of Memphis in the 2003–04 college basketball season, the 83rd season of Tiger basketball. The Tigers were coached by fourth-year head coach John Calipari, and they played their home games for the final season at the Pyramid Arena in Memphis, Tennessee.

== Roster ==
2003–04 Memphis Tigers men's basketball team
Players
Coaches

Pos.	#	Name	Height	Weight	Year	Hometown
F	32	Sean Banks	6 ft 8 in (2.03 m)	206 lb (93 kg)	Fr	New York, New York
G	1	Antonio Burks	6 ft 1 in (1.85 m)	195 lb (88 kg)	Sr	Memphis, Tennessee
F	10	Rodney Carney	6 ft 7 in (2.01 m)	205 lb (93 kg)	So	Indianapolis, Indiana
F	14	Simplice Njoya	6 ft 10 in (2.08 m)	245 lb (111 kg)	So	Yaounde, Cameroon
G	30	Jared Sandridge	6 ft 2 in (1.88 m)	170 lb (77 kg)	Fr	Memphis, Tennessee
G	0	Clyde Wade	6 ft 0 in (1.83 m)	185 lb (84 kg)	RS So	Memphis, Tennessee

Head coach

- John Calipari (Clarion)

Assistant coach(es)

- Tony Barbee (UMass)
- Derek Kellogg (UMass)
- John Robic (Denison)

Legend

- (C) Team captain
- (S) Suspended
- (I) Ineligible
- (W) Walk-on
- Injured
- Current redshirt

Roster

== Schedule and results ==
Date time, TV	Rank^{#}	Opponent^{#}	Result	Record	Site (attendance) city, state
Regular Season
Nov 13, 2003*		vs. No. 20 Wake Forest; Coaches vs. Cancer Classic	L 76–85	0–1	Madison Square Garden; New York, New York
Nov 22, 2003*		Fordham	W 94–64	1–1	Pyramid Arena; Memphis, Tennessee
Nov 29, 2003*		Austin Peay	W 74–60	2–1	Pyramid Arena; Memphis, Tennessee
Dec 3, 2003*		Tennessee-Martin	W 84–64	3–1	Pyramid Arena; Memphis, Tennessee
Dec 6, 2003*		at Ole Miss	W 73–62	4–1	Tad Smith Coliseum; Oxford, Mississippi
Dec 13, 2003*		at No. 14 Illinois	L 64–74	4–2	Assembly Hall; Champaign, Illinois
Dec 17, 2003*		Belmont	W 89–83	5–2	Pyramid Arena; Memphis, Tennessee
Dec 22, 2003*		Samford	W 63–62	6–2	Pyramid Arena; Memphis, Tennessee
Dec 27, 2003*		No. 11 Missouri	W 61–59	7–2	Pyramid Arena; Memphis, Tennessee
Dec 29, 2003*		Oakland	W 69–63	8–2	Pyramid Arena; Memphis, Tennessee
Jan 6, 2004*		at Villanova	W 73–57	9–2	Wells Fargo Center; Philadelphia, Pennsylvania
Jan 10, 2004*		at Southern Miss	L 63–66	9–3	Reed Green Coliseum; Hattiesburg, Mississippi
Conference USA tournament
Mar 11, 2004*	(2) No. 23	vs. (7) Saint Louis; Quarterfinals	L 61–72	21–7	Riverfront Coliseum; Cincinnati, Ohio
NCAA tournament
Mar 19, 2004*	(7 E) No. 24	vs. (10 E) No. 23 South Carolina; First Round	W 59–43	22–7	Kemper Arena; Kansas City, Missouri
Mar 21, 2004*	(7 E) No. 24	vs. (2 E) No. 4 Oklahoma State; Second Round	L 53–70	22–8	Kemper Arena; Kansas City, Missouri
*Non-conference game. (#) Tournament seedings in parentheses. E=East. All times are in Central Time.
