= 2003–04 Louisville Cardinals men's basketball team =

American college basketball season

2003–04 Louisville Cardinals men's basketball

NCAA tournament, Round of 64
- Conference: Conference USA
- Record: 20–10 (9–7 CUSA)
- Head coach: Rick Pitino (3rd season)
- Home arena: Freedom Hall

2003–04 Conference USA men's basketball standings
	Conf.				Overall
Team	W		L	PCT	W		L	PCT
DePaul	12	–	4	.750	22	–	10	.688
No. 24 Memphis	12	–	4	.750	22	–	8	.733
No. 11 Cincinnati †	12	–	4	.750	25	–	7	.781
UAB	12	–	4	.750	22	–	10	.688
Charlotte	12	–	4	.750	21	–	9	.700
Louisville	9	–	7	.563	20	–	10	.667
Saint Louis	9	–	7	.563	19	–	13	.594
Marquette	8	–	8	.500	19	–	12	.613
TCU	7	–	9	.438	12	–	17	.414
Southern Miss	6	–	10	.375	13	–	15	.464
East Carolina	5	–	11	.313	13	–	14	.481
Tulane	4	–	12	.250	11	–	17	.393
Houston	3	–	13	.188	9	–	18	.333
South Florida	1	–	15	.063	7	–	20	.259
† 2004 Conference USA Tournament winner Rankings from AP poll

The 2003–04 Louisville Cardinals men's basketball team represented the University of Louisville in the 2003–04 NCAA Division I men's basketball season. The head coach was Rick Pitino and the team finished the season with an overall record of 20–10.

== Schedule and results ==
Date time, TV	Rank^{#}	Opponent^{#}	Result	Record	High points	High rebounds	High assists	Site (attendance) city, state
Regular Season
November 29, 2003*; 1:30 pm	No. 17	vs. Iowa	L 69–70 ^{OT}	0–1	18 – Whitehead	14 – Whitehead	6 – Tied	Conseco Fieldhouse (19,213); Indianapolis, Indiana
December 4, 2003*; 8:30 pm		vs. Western Kentucky	W 93–63	1–1	22 – Whitehead	10 – Whitehead	8 – Garcia	Gaylord Entertainment Center (19,232); Nashville, Tennessee
December 7, 2003*; 2:00 pm		Holy Cross	W 56–40	2–1	24 – Garcia	8 – Dartez	3 – Tied	Freedom Hall (19,232); Louisville, Kentucky
December 10, 2003*; 7:30 pm		Seton Hall	W 80–71	3–1	24 – Garcia	11 – Whitehead	4 – Tied	Freedom Hall (19,328); Louisville, Kentucky
December 13, 2003*; 12:00 pm		No. 1 Florida	W 73–65	4–1	21 – Garcia	9 – Whitehead	4 – Tied	Freedom Hall (20,032); Louisville, Kentucky
December 20, 2003*; 2:00 pm	No. 20	Austin Peay	W 80–63	5–1	21 – Garcia	7 – Whitehead	8 – Garcia	Freedom Hall (19,138); Louisville, Kentucky
December 23, 2003*; 7:30 pm	No. 20	VMI	W 107–56	6–1	31 – Dean	15 – Whitehead	8 – Garcia	Freedom Hall (18,174); Louisville, Kentucky
December 27, 2003*; 5:00 pm	No. 20	at No. 2 Kentucky	W 65–58	7–1	13 – George	8 – George	5 – Garcia	Rupp Arena (24,328); Lexington, Kentucky
December 30, 2003*; 7:30 pm	No. 20	Toledo	W 92–56	8–1	19 – Whitehead	9 – Whitehead	6 – Jenkins	Freedom Hall (19,427); Louisville, Kentucky
January 3, 2004*; 2:00 pm	No. 11	Murray State	W 91–69	9–1	23 – Whitehead	7 – Garcia	15 – Garcia	Freedom Hall (19,292); Louisville, Kentucky
January 7, 2004; 7:30 pm	No. 10	Southern Miss	W 76–42	10–1 (1–0)	15 – Daniels	10 – George	4 – Tied	Freedom Hall (19,319); Louisville, Kentucky
January 10, 2004; 1:00 pm	No. 10	at South Florida	W 85–50	11–1 (2–0)	16 – Dean	7 – Diakite	5 – Garcia	Sun Dome (7,011); Tampa, Florida
January 15, 2004; 9:00 pm	No. 8	at East Carolina	W 76–66	12–1 (3–0)	16 – Tied	10 – Whitehead	4 – Whitehead	Williams Arena at Minges Coliseum (7,553); Greenville, North Carolina
January 17, 2004; 7:30 pm	No. 8	Tulane	W 79–58	13–1 (4–0)	16 – Whitehead	12 – George	4 – O'Bannon	Freedom Hall (19,480); Louisville, Kentucky
January 21, 2004; 7:00 pm	No. 5	No. 6 Cincinnati	W 93–66	14–1 (5–0)	21 – Dean	8 – Whitehead	7 – Garcia	Freedom Hall (20,079); Louisville, Kentucky
January 25, 2004*; 7:00 pm	No. 5	at Tennessee	W 65–62	15–1	24 – Garcia	8 – George	4 – Dartez	Thompson-Boling Arena (15,086); Knoxville, Tennessee
January 28, 2004; 7:30 pm	No. 4	Houston	W 64–48	16–1 (6–0)	17 – Tied	9 – Tied	5 – O'Bannon	Freedom Hall (19,226); Louisville, Kentucky
January 31, 2004; 3:00 pm	No. 4	Marquette	L 70–77	16–2 (6–1)	20 – Garcia	19 – Whitehead	4 – Garcia	Freedom Hall (19,864); Louisville, Kentucky
February 4, 2004; 10:00 pm	No. 6	at Memphis	L 58–62	16–3 (6–2)	26 – O'Bannon	6 – Tied	3 – Tied	The Pyramid (19,044); Memphis, Tennessee
February 7, 2004; 6:00 pm	No. 6	UAB	W 73–55	17–3 (7–2)	15 – O'Bannon	18 – Whitehead	3 – Tied	Freedom Hall (19,723); Louisville, Kentucky
February 12, 2004; 7:00 pm	No. 9	at Charlotte	L 71–77	17–4 (7–3)	17 – O'Bannon	7 – Whitehead	4 – Garcia	Halton Arena (9,105); Charlotte, North Carolina
February 17, 2004; 7:00 pm	No. 10	at TCU	L 46–71	17–5 (7–4)	9 – Dartez	5 – Tied	3 – Garcia	Daniel-Meyer Coliseum (6,028); Fort Worth, Texas
February 21, 2004; 1:00 pm	No. 10	at No. 17 Cincinnati	L 61–66 ^{OT}	17–6 (7–5)	27 – Garcia	9 – Dean	7 – Garcia	Shoemaker Center (13,176); Cincinnati, Ohio
February 25, 2004; 7:30 pm	No. 21	DePaul	L 58–60 ^{OT}	17–7 (7–6)	19 – Garcia	8 – Garcia	4 – Garcia	Freedom Hall (19,505); Louisville, Kentucky
February 28, 2004; 1:00 pm	No. 21	No. 19 Memphis	W 66–60	18–7 (8–6)	18 – Garcia	8 – George	4 – Mohammed	Freedom Hall (19,824); Louisville, Kentucky
March 3, 2004; 8:00 pm	No. 25	at Saint Louis	W 75–48	19–7 (9–6)	17 – Garcia	11 – Dartez	7 – Garcia	Savvis Center (11,020); St. Louis, Missouri
March 6, 2004; 1:30 pm	No. 25	at Marquette	L 80–81	19–8 (9–7)	23 – Garcia	7 – Dartez	5 – Tied	Bradley Center (17,508); Milwaukee, Wisconsin
Conference USA Tournament
March 10, 2004*; 7:05 pm	(6)	vs. (11) East Carolina; First Round	W 61–54	20–8	22 – Garcia	10 – Dartez	2 – Tied	U.S. Bank Arena; Cincinnati, Ohio
March 11, 2004*; 7:05 pm	(6)	vs. (3) No. 13 Cincinnati; Quarterfinals	L 62–64	20–9	28 – Garcia	8 – Dartez	2 – Dartez	U.S. Bank Arena (16,202); Cincinnati, Ohio
NCAA Tournament
March 19, 2004*; 9:45 pm, CBS	(10 ATL)	vs. (7 ATL) Xavier; First Round	L 70–80	20–10	19 – Dean	6 – George	7 – Garcia	Amway Arena (15,961); Orlando, Florida
*Non-conference game. ^{#}Rankings from AP Poll. (#) Tournament seedings in parentheses. ATL=Atlanta regional. All times are in Eastern Time.
