= 2003–04 UAB Blazers men's basketball team =

American college basketball season

2003–04 UAB Blazers men's basketball

Conference USA regular season co-champions

NCAA tournament, Sweet Sixteen
- Conference: Conference USA

Ranking
- Coaches: No. 23
- Record: 22–10 (12–4 C-USA)
- Head coach: Mike Anderson (2nd season)
- Home arena: Bartow Arena

2003–04 Conference USA men's basketball standings
	Conf.				Overall
Team	W		L	PCT	W		L	PCT
DePaul	12	–	4	.750	22	–	10	.688
No. 24 Memphis	12	–	4	.750	22	–	8	.733
No. 11 Cincinnati †	12	–	4	.750	25	–	7	.781
UAB	12	–	4	.750	22	–	10	.688
Charlotte	12	–	4	.750	21	–	9	.700
Louisville	9	–	7	.563	20	–	10	.667
Saint Louis	9	–	7	.563	19	–	13	.594
Marquette	8	–	8	.500	19	–	12	.613
TCU	7	–	9	.438	12	–	17	.414
Southern Miss	6	–	10	.375	13	–	15	.464
East Carolina	5	–	11	.313	13	–	14	.481
Tulane	4	–	12	.250	11	–	17	.393
Houston	3	–	13	.188	9	–	18	.333
South Florida	1	–	15	.063	7	–	20	.259
† 2004 Conference USA Tournament winner Rankings from AP poll

The 2003–04 UAB Blazers men's basketball team represented the University of Alabama at Birmingham as a member of the Conference USA during the 2003–04 NCAA Division I men's basketball season. This was head coach Mike Anderson's second season at UAB, and the Blazers played their home games at Bartow Arena. They finished the season 22–10, 12–4 in C-USA play and lost in the semifinals of the C-USA tournament. They received an at-large bid to the NCAA tournament as No. 9 seed in the St. Louis region. The Blazers defeated Washington and No. 1 seed Kentucky to reach the Sweet Sixteen. In the Regional semifinal, UAB fell to Kansas, 100–74.

== Roster ==
2003–04 UAB Blazers men's basketball team
Players
Coaches

Pos.	#	Name	Height	Weight	Year	Hometown
G	0	Carldell Johnson	5 ft 10 in (1.78 m)	175 lb (79 kg)	So	New Orleans, Louisiana
G/F	1	Donell Taylor	6 ft 6 in (1.98 m)	180 lb (82 kg)	Jr	Montgomery, Alabama
G/F	2	Ronell Taylor	6 ft 5 in (1.96 m)	180 lb (82 kg)	Jr	Montgomery, Alabama
F	3	Marques Lewis	6 ft 8 in (2.03 m)	280 lb (127 kg)	Jr	Milwaukee, Wisconsin
F	4	Gabe Kennedy	6 ft 9 in (2.06 m)	255 lb (116 kg)	Sr	Camden, Alabama
G	5	DeAndre' Carroll	6 ft 4 in (1.93 m)	190 lb (86 kg)	Fr	Birmingham, Alabama
G	10	Morris Finley	5 ft 11 in (1.8 m)	175 lb (79 kg)	Sr	Lafayette, Alabama
G	12	Reed Davis	6 ft 1 in (1.85 m)	180 lb (82 kg)	So	Birmingham, Alabama
F	15	Lee Cobb	6 ft 7 in (2.01 m)	230 lb (104 kg)	Sr	Somerville, Alabama
G	21	Tony Johnson	6 ft 4 in (1.93 m)	200 lb (91 kg)	Sr	Morganfield, Kentucky
F	23	Demario Eddins	6 ft 7 in (2.01 m)	190 lb (86 kg)	So	Chicago, Illinois
F	25	Ernest Little	6 ft 9 in (2.06 m)	230 lb (104 kg)	Fr	Monroeville, Alabama
G	31	Richard Jones	6 ft 5 in (1.96 m)	210 lb (95 kg)	So	Oklahoma City, Oklahoma
G	32	Sidney Ball	6 ft 5 in (1.96 m)	220 lb (100 kg)	Sr	Duncanville, Alabama
G	42	Derrick Broom	6 ft 5 in (1.96 m)	200 lb (91 kg)	So	Cartersville, Georgia
F	44	Brandon Tobias	6 ft 7 in (2.01 m)	220 lb (100 kg)	So	Fort Lauderdale, Florida

Head coach

- Mike Anderson

Assistant coach(es)

Legend

- (C) Team captain
- (S) Suspended
- (I) Ineligible
- (W) Walk-on
- Injured
- Current redshirt

Roster
Last update: July 2, 2021

== Schedule and results ==
Date time, TV	Rank^{#}	Opponent^{#}	Result	Record	Site (attendance) city, state
Regular season
Nov 24, 2003*		Georgia Southern	W 94–73	1–0	Bartow Arena (3,270); Birmingham, Alabama
Nov 29, 2003*		Richmond	W 83–75	2–0	Bartow Arena (3,898); Birmingham, Alabama
Dec 3, 2003*		Birmingham–Southern	W 90–67	3–0	Bartow Arena (5,056); Birmingham, Alabama
Dec 6, 2003*		at Mississippi State	L 84–86	3–1	Humphrey Coliseum (6,120); Starkville, Mississippi
Dec 15, 2003*		vs. Western Michigan	L 62–69	3–2	Mitchell Center (N/A); Mobile, Alabama
Dec 18, 2003*		at VCU	W 68–58	4–2	Siegel Center (2,412); Richmond, Virginia
Dec 20, 2003*		Alabama A&M	W 81–68	5–2	Bartow Arena (3,904); Birmingham, Alabama
Dec 23, 2003*		Louisiana Tech	W 79–67	6–2	Bartow Arena (3,183); Birmingham, Alabama
Dec 27, 2003*		vs. LSU	L 62–78	6–3	New Orleans Arena (5,328); New Orleans, Louisiana
Dec 30, 2003*		Marshall	L 66–68	6–4	Bartow Arena (3,811); Birmingham, Alabama
Jan 3, 2004*		South Alabama	W 90–75	7–4	Bartow Arena (4,118); Birmingham, Alabama
Jan 7, 2004		at East Carolina	W 71–68	8–4 (1–0)	Minges Coliseum (4,911); Greenville, North Carolina
Jan 10, 2004		Houston	W 64–42	9–4 (2–0)	Bartow Arena (5,176); Birmingham, Alabama
Jan 17, 2004		at DePaul	L 64–75	9–5 (2–1)	Allstate Arena (8,098); Rosemont, Illinois
Jan 20, 2004		South Florida	W 86–47	10–5 (3–1)	Bartow Arena (3,930); Birmingham, Alabama
Jan 24, 2004		at Charlotte	W 69–62	11–5 (4–1)	Dale F. Halton Arena (8,418); Charlotte, North Carolina
Jan 28, 2004		Tulane	W 80–59	12–5 (5–1)	Bartow Arena (4,360); Birmingham, Alabama
Jan 31, 2004		Saint Louis	W 72–52	13–5 (6–1)	Bartow Arena (7,192); Birmingham, Alabama
Feb 7, 2004		at No. 6 Louisville	L 55–73	13–6 (6–2)	Freedom Hall (19,723); Louisville, Kentucky
Feb 11, 2004		at Southern Miss	W 69–65	14–6 (7–2)	Reed Green Coliseum (2,906); Hattiesburg, Mississippi
Feb 14, 2004		East Carolina	W 72–69	15–6 (8–2)	Bartow Arena (4,154); Birmingham, Alabama
Feb 18, 2004		No. 17 Cincinnati	W 80–69	16–6 (9–2)	Bartow Arena (9,312); Birmingham, Alabama
Feb 21, 2004		at No. 23 Memphis	L 66–73	16–7 (9–3)	The Pyramid (18,156); Memphis, Tennessee
Feb 25, 2004		at Tulane	L 69–74	16–8 (9–4)	Avron B. Fogelman Arena (1,588); New Orleans, Louisiana
Feb 28, 2004		Marquette	W 87–69	17–8 (10–4)	Bartow Arena (7,132); Birmingham, Alabama
Mar 3, 2004		at South Florida	W 61–59	18–8 (11–4)	Sun Dome (2,912); Tampa, Florida
Mar 6, 2004		TCU	W 87–62	19–8 (12–4)	Bartow Arena (5,146); Birmingham, Alabama
C-USA tournament
Mar 11, 2004*	(4)	vs. (5) Charlotte; Quarterfinals	W 77–66	20–8	U.S. Bank Arena (11,777); Cincinnati, Ohio
Mar 12, 2004*	(4)	vs. (1) DePaul; Semifinals	L 74–75 ^{OT}	20–9	U.S. Bank Arena (14,677); Cincinnati, Ohio
NCAA tournament
Mar 19, 2004*	(9 S)	vs. (8 S) Washington; First Round	W 102–100	21–9	Nationwide Arena (19,588); Columbus, Ohio
Mar 21, 2004*	(9 S)	vs. (1 S) No. 1 Kentucky; Second Round	W 76–75	22–9	Nationwide Arena (19,588); Columbus, Ohio
Mar 26, 2004*	(9 S)	vs. (4 S) No. 16 Kansas; Sweet Sixteen	L 74–100	22–10	Edward Jones Dome (30,000); St. Louis, Missouri
*Non-conference game. ^{#}Rankings from AP poll. (#) Tournament seedings in parentheses. S=St. Louis.
