= 2003–04 Cincinnati Bearcats men's basketball team =

American college basketball season

2003–04 Cincinnati Bearcats men's basketball

Conference USA Regular season co-champions Conference USA tournament champions

NCAA tournament, second round
- Conference: Conference USA

Ranking
- Coaches: No. 18
- AP: No. 11
- Record: 25–7 (12–4 C-USA)
- Head coach: Bob Huggins (15th season)
- Assistant coaches: Mick Cronin (8th season); Andy Kennedy (3rd season)
- Home arena: Myrl Shoemaker Center

2003–04 Conference USA men's basketball standings
	Conf.				Overall
Team	W		L	PCT	W		L	PCT
DePaul	12	–	4	.750	22	–	10	.688
No. 24 Memphis	12	–	4	.750	22	–	8	.733
No. 11 Cincinnati †	12	–	4	.750	25	–	7	.781
UAB	12	–	4	.750	22	–	10	.688
Charlotte	12	–	4	.750	21	–	9	.700
Louisville	9	–	7	.563	20	–	10	.667
Saint Louis	9	–	7	.563	19	–	13	.594
Marquette	8	–	8	.500	19	–	12	.613
TCU	7	–	9	.438	12	–	17	.414
Southern Miss	6	–	10	.375	13	–	15	.464
East Carolina	5	–	11	.313	13	–	14	.481
Tulane	4	–	12	.250	11	–	17	.393
Houston	3	–	13	.188	9	–	18	.333
South Florida	1	–	15	.063	7	–	20	.259
† 2004 Conference USA Tournament winner Rankings from AP poll

The 2003–04 Cincinnati Bearcats men's basketball team represented University of Cincinnati as a member of Conference USA during the 2003–04 NCAA Division I men's basketball season. The head coach was Bob Huggins, serving in his 15th year at the school. The team finished in a 5-way tie atop the conference regular season standings and won the Conference USA tournament titles to earn an automatic bid to the NCAA tournament as No. 4 seed in the Atlanta region. After an opening round victory over East Tennessee State, Cincinnati was beaten in the second round by No. 5 seed Illinois, 92–68. The Bearcats finished with a 25–7 record (12–4 C-USA).

== Roster ==
2003–04 Cincinnati Bearcats men's basketball team
Players
Coaches

Pos.	#	Name	Height	Weight	Year	Hometown
G	2	Field Williams	6 ft 4 in (1.93 m)	235 lb (107 kg)	Sr	Houston, Texas
G	3	John Meeker (W)	6 ft 1 in (1.85 m)	175 lb (79 kg)	Sr	Troy, Ohio
G	10	Jamaal Lucas	6 ft 2 in (1.88 m)	195 lb (88 kg)	Sr	Corpus Christi, Texas
F	21	James White	6 ft 7 in (2.01 m)	210 lb (95 kg)	So	Washington, D.C.
F	54	Jason Maxiell	6 ft 7 in (2.01 m)	250 lb (113 kg)	Jr	Chicago, Illinois

Head coach

- Bob Huggins

Assistant coach(es)

- Mick Cronin
- Andy Kennedy

Legend

- (C) Team captain
- (S) Suspended
- (I) Ineligible
- (W) Walk-on
- Injured
- Current redshirt

== Schedule and results ==
Date time, TV	Rank^{#}	Opponent^{#}	Result	Record	Site city, state
Regular Season
Mar 6, 2004	No. 13	No. 20 Memphis	W 83–79	21–6 (12–4)	Fifth Third Arena; Cincinnati, Ohio
Conference USA Tournament
Mar 11, 2004*	No. 13	Louisville; Quarterfinals	W 64–62	22–6	Riverfront Coliseum; Cincinnati, Ohio
Mar 12, 2004*	No. 13	Saint Louis; Semifinals	W 66–46	23–6	Riverfront Coliseum; Cincinnati, Ohio
Mar 13, 2004*	No. 13	DePaul; Championship game	W 55–50	24–6	Riverfront Coliseum; Cincinnati, Ohio
NCAA tournament
Mar 19, 2004*	(4 ATL) No. 11	vs. (13 ATL) East Tennessee State; First Round	W 80–77	25–6	Nationwide Arena; Columbus, Ohio
Mar 21, 2004*	(4 ATL) No. 11	vs. (5 ATL) No. 13 Illinois; Second Round	L 68–92	25–7	Nationwide Arena; Columbus, Ohio
*Non-conference game. ^{#}Rankings from AP poll. (#) Tournament seedings in parentheses. ATL=Atlanta.

== Rankings ==
Ranking movements Legend: ██ Increase in ranking ██ Decrease in ranking т = Tied with team above or below
	Week																		
Poll	Pre	1	2	3	4	5	6	7	8	9	10	11	12	13	14	15	16	17	Final
AP	18	19	19	18	16	14	12	11	10	6	8	10	13	17	15	13	13	11	Not released
Coaches	19 т	19	19	17	16	12	11	10	7	5	7	10	12	14	12	12	12	12	18

*AP did not release a Week 1 poll nor post-NCAA Tournament rankings
