= 2003–04 DePaul Blue Demons men's basketball team =

American college basketball season

2003–04 DePaul Blue Demons men's basketball
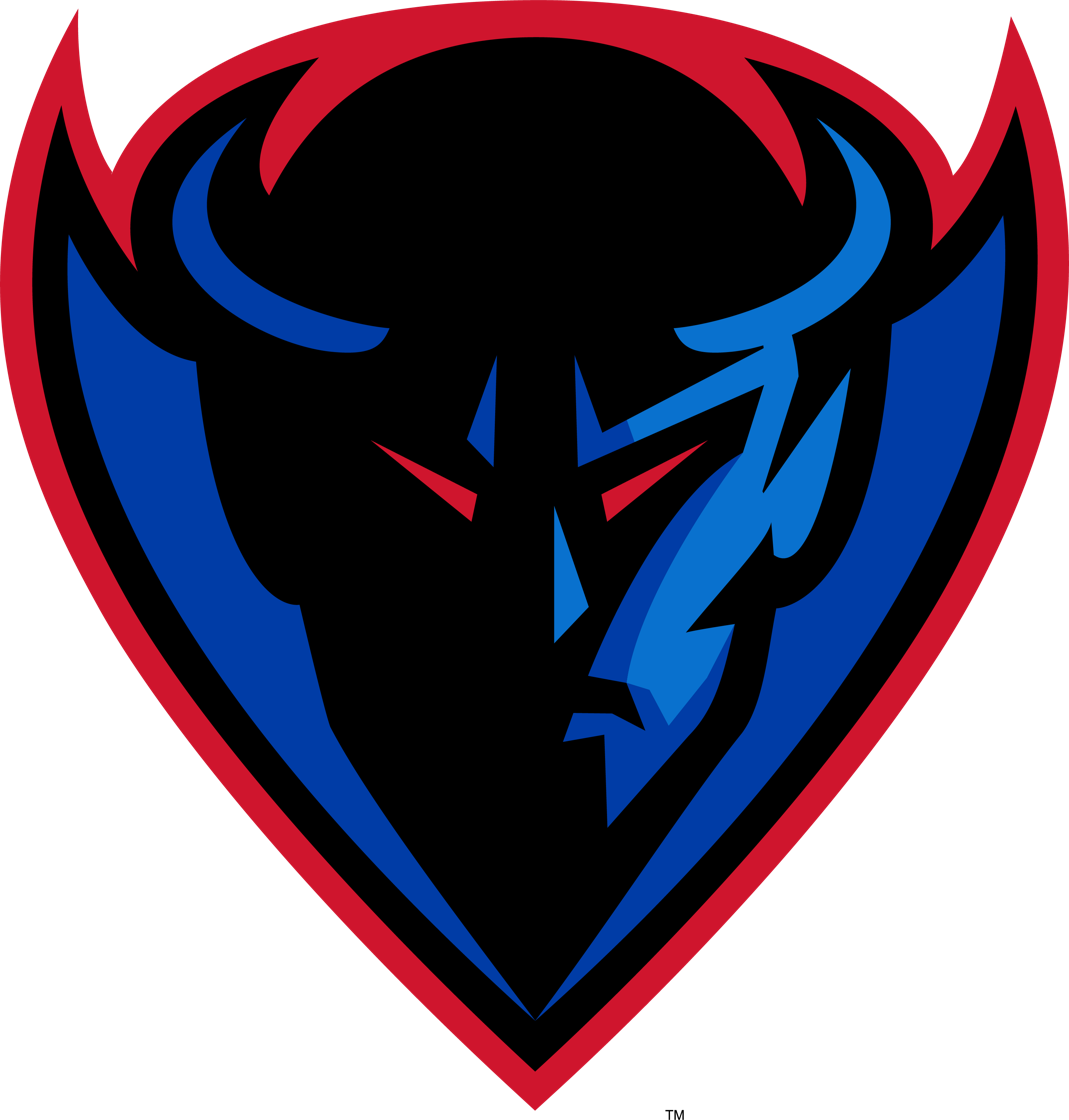

Conference USA Regular season co-champions

NCAA tournament, second round
- Conference: Conference USA
- Record: 22–10 (12–4 CUSA)
- Head coach: Dave Leitao (2nd season)
- Home arena: Allstate Arena

2003–04 Conference USA men's basketball standings
	Conf.				Overall
Team	W		L	PCT	W		L	PCT
DePaul	12	–	4	.750	22	–	10	.688
No. 24 Memphis	12	–	4	.750	22	–	8	.733
No. 11 Cincinnati †	12	–	4	.750	25	–	7	.781
UAB	12	–	4	.750	22	–	10	.688
Charlotte	12	–	4	.750	21	–	9	.700
Louisville	9	–	7	.563	20	–	10	.667
Saint Louis	9	–	7	.563	19	–	13	.594
Marquette	8	–	8	.500	19	–	12	.613
TCU	7	–	9	.438	12	–	17	.414
Southern Miss	6	–	10	.375	13	–	15	.464
East Carolina	5	–	11	.313	13	–	14	.481
Tulane	4	–	12	.250	11	–	17	.393
Houston	3	–	13	.188	9	–	18	.333
South Florida	1	–	15	.063	7	–	20	.259
† 2004 Conference USA Tournament winner Rankings from AP poll

2003–04 DePaul Blue Demons men's basketball team represented DePaul University as a member of Conference USA during the 2003–04 men's college basketball season. The team was led by head coach Dave Leitao and played their home games at Allstate Arena in Rosemont, Illinois. The Blue Demons finished in a 5-way tie atop the conference regular season standings, reached the championship game of the Conference USA Tournament, and received an at-large bid to the NCAA tournament. Playing as the No. 7 seed in the Phoenix regional, DePaul defeated Dayton in overtime in the opening round before losing to eventual National champion Connecticut in the second round 72–55. The team finished the season with a record of 22–10 (12–4 C-USA).

As of 2025, this is the DePaul program's most recent NCAA tournament appearance; since joining the Big East Conference two seasons later, they have not yet advanced to March Madness.

== Roster ==
2003–04 DePaul Blue Demons men's basketball team
Players
Coaches

Pos.	#	Name	Height	Weight	Year	Previous school	Hometown
F	4	Andre Brown	6 ft 9 in (2.06 m)	240 lb (109 kg)	Sr	Leo Catholic HS	Chicago, IL
G	33	Drake Diener	6 ft 5 in (1.96 m)	195 lb (88 kg)	Jr	Goodrich HS	Fond du Lac, WI

Head coach

- Dave Leitao

Assistant coach(es)

Legend

- (C) Team captain
- (S) Suspended
- (I) Ineligible
- (W) Walk-on
- Injured
- Current redshirt

== Schedule and results ==
Date time, TV	Rank^{#}	Opponent^{#}	Result	Record	Site city, state
Regular season
Nov 21, 2003*		Loyola–Chicago	W 73–61	1–0	Allstate Arena (7,354); Rosemont, Illinois
Nov 25, 2003*		Northwestern	W 65–53	2–0	Allstate Arena (7,122); Rosemont, Illinois
Nov 29, 2003*		vs. Indiana State; Spartan Classic	W 78–66	3–0	Breslin Student Events Center (14,759); East Lansing, Michigan
Nov 30, 2003*		at No. 3 Michigan State; Spartan Classic	L 81–89	3–1	Breslin Student Events Center (14,759); East Lansing, Michigan
Dec 7, 2003*		Bradley	W 77–74	4–1	Allstate Arena (8,033); Rosemont, Illinois
Dec 9, 2003*		at Ohio	W 63–60	5–1	Convocation Center (2,043); Athens, Ohio
Dec 14, 2003*		Notre Dame	L 69–82	5–2	Allstate Arena (14,198); Rosemont, Illinois
Dec 20, 2003*		Toledo	L 81–93	5–3	Allstate Arena (6,621); Rosemont, Illinois
Dec 27, 2003*		at Seton Hall	L 62–76	5–4	Continental Airlines Arena (7,431); East Rutherford, New Jersey
Dec 31, 2003*		Southeast Missouri State	W 57–50	6–4	Allstate Arena (6,086); Rosemont, Illinois
Jan 3, 2004*		Chicago State	W 81–74	7–4	Allstate Arena (6,237); Rosemont, Illinois
Jan 6, 2004		Charlotte	L 70–75	7–5 (0–1)	Allstate Arena (7,155); Rosemont, Illinois
Jan 10, 2004		at No. 11 Cincinnati	L 65–90	7–6 (0–2)	Fifth Third Arena (13,176); Cincinnati, Ohio
Jan 13, 2004		Memphis	W 82–73	8–6 (1–2)	Allstate Arena (8,228); Rosemont, Illinois
Jan 17, 2004		UAB	W 75–64	9–6 (2–2)	Allstate Arena (8,098); Rosemont, Illinois
Jan 20, 2004		at TCU	W 61–54	10–6 (3–2)	Daniel-Meyer Coliseum (4,084); Fort Worth, Texas
Jan 24, 2004		at Marquette	L 62–70	10–7 (3–3)	Bradley Center (18,645); Milwaukee, Wisconsin
Jan 31, 2004		at East Carolina	W 70–65	11–7 (4–3)	Williams Arena at Minges Coliseum (5,329); Greenville, North Carolina
Feb 3, 2004		Tulane	W 72–58	12–7 (5–3)	Allstate Arena (7,851); Rosemont, Illinois
Feb 7, 2004		Marquette	W 84–78	13–7 (6–3)	Allstate Arena (16,693); Rosemont, Illinois
Feb 11, 2004		at Saint Louis	W 70–68	14–7 (7–3)	Scottrade Center (9,148); St. Louis, Missouri
Feb 14, 2004		at Houston	W 66–54	15–7 (8–3)	Hofheinz Pavilion (2,194); Houston, Texas
Feb 21, 2004		Saint Louis	L 62–69	15–8 (8–4)	Allstate Arena (9,843); Rosemont, Illinois
Feb 25, 2004		at No. 21 Louisville	W 60–58 ^{OT}	16–8 (9–4)	Freedom Hall (19,505); Louisville, Kentucky
Feb 28, 2004		Southern Miss	W 80–51	17–8 (10–4)	Allstate Arena (8,861); Rosemont, Illinois
Mar 4, 2004		No. 13 Cincinnati	W 68–65	18–8 (11–4)	Allstate Arena (13,235); Rosemont, Illinois
Mar 6, 2004		South Florida	W 78–66	19–8 (12–4)	DePaul Athletic Center (3,356); Chicago, Illinois
Conference USA tournament
Mar 11, 2004*		vs. TCU; Quarterfinals	W 89–65	20–8	Riverfront Coliseum (11,777); Cincinnati, Ohio
Mar 12, 2004*		vs. UAB; Semifinals	W 75–74 ^{OT}	21–8	Riverfront Coliseum (14,867); Cincinnati, Ohio
Mar 13, 2004*		at No. 13 Cincinnati; Championship game	L 50–55	21–9	Riverfront Coliseum (13,787); Cincinnati, Ohio
NCAA tournament
Mar 18, 2004*	(7 PHX)	vs. (10 PHX) Dayton; First Round	W 76–69 ^{2OT}	22–9	HSBC Arena (18,698); Buffalo, New York
Mar 20, 2004*	(7 PHX)	vs. (2 PHX) No. 7 Connecticut; Second Round	L 55–72	22–10	HSBC Arena (18,686); Buffalo, New York
*Non-conference game. ^{#}Rankings from AP Poll. (#) Tournament seedings in parentheses. PHX=Phoenix.
