= 2003–04 Marquette Golden Eagles men's basketball team =

American college basketball season

2003–04 Marquette Golden Eagles men's basketball

NIT, Quarterfinals
- Conference: Conference USA
- Record: 19–12 (8–8 C-USA)
- Head coach: Tom Crean (5th season)
- Home arena: Bradley Center

2003–04 Conference USA men's basketball standings
	Conf.				Overall
Team	W		L	PCT	W		L	PCT
DePaul	12	–	4	.750	22	–	10	.688
No. 24 Memphis	12	–	4	.750	22	–	8	.733
No. 11 Cincinnati †	12	–	4	.750	25	–	7	.781
UAB	12	–	4	.750	22	–	10	.688
Charlotte	12	–	4	.750	21	–	9	.700
Louisville	9	–	7	.563	20	–	10	.667
Saint Louis	9	–	7	.563	19	–	13	.594
Marquette	8	–	8	.500	19	–	12	.613
TCU	7	–	9	.438	12	–	17	.414
Southern Miss	6	–	10	.375	13	–	15	.464
East Carolina	5	–	11	.313	13	–	14	.481
Tulane	4	–	12	.250	11	–	17	.393
Houston	3	–	13	.188	9	–	18	.333
South Florida	1	–	15	.063	7	–	20	.259
† 2004 Conference USA Tournament winner Rankings from AP poll

The 2003–04 Marquette Golden Eagles men's basketball team represented Marquette University in the 2003–2004 NCAA Division I basketball season.

== Roster ==
2003–04 Marquette Golden Eagles men's basketball team
Players
Coaches

Pos.	#	Name	Height	Weight	Year	Hometown
G	1	Brandon Bell	5 ft 11 in (1.8 m)	180 lb (82 kg)	Fr	Flint, Michigan
G	10	Karon Bradley	5 ft 11 in (1.8 m)	185 lb (84 kg)	So	Katy, Texas
G	32	Joe Chapman	6 ft 4 in (1.93 m)	195 lb (88 kg)	So	Sauk Village, Illinois
G	34	Travis Diener	6 ft 1 in (1.85 m)	175 lb (79 kg)	Jr	Fond du Lac, Wisconsin
F	42	Andy Freund	6 ft 8 in (2.03 m)	210 lb (95 kg)	So	Wauwatosa, Wisconsin
G	23	Tony Gries	5 ft 10 in (1.78 m)	170 lb (77 kg)	So	Kiel, Wisconsin
C	33	Chris Grimm	6 ft 10 in (2.08 m)	225 lb (102 kg)	So	Brighton, Michigan
C	35	Marcus Jackson	6 ft 8 in (2.03 m)	240 lb (109 kg)	Jr	Peoria, Illinois
G	30	Dameon Mason	6 ft 5 in (1.96 m)	180 lb (82 kg)	So	Aurora, Illinois
C	5	Scott Merritt	6 ft 10 in (2.08 m)	245 lb (111 kg)	Sr	Wauwatosa, Wisconsin
F	20	Steve Novak	6 ft 10 in (2.08 m)	220 lb (100 kg)	So	Brown Deer, Wisconsin
F	40	Terry Sanders	6 ft 8 in (2.03 m)	225 lb (102 kg)	Sr	Milwaukee, Wisconsin
G	12	Jared Sichting	6 ft 0 in (1.83 m)	165 lb (75 kg)	So	Minnetonka, Minnesota
F	1	Todd Townsend	6 ft 7 in (2.01 m)	215 lb (98 kg)	Jr	Chicago, Illinois

Head coach

- Tom Crean

Assistant coach(es)

Legend

- (C) Team captain
- (S) Suspended
- (I) Ineligible
- (W) Walk-on
- Injured
- Current redshirt

== Schedule ==
Date time, TV	Rank^{#}	Opponent^{#}	Result	Record	Site city, state
November 13*		at St. John's	W 52–45	1–0	Madison Square Garden; New York, NY
November 21*		Savannah State	W 79–41	2–0	Bradley Center; Milwaukee, WI
November 22*		Valparaiso	W 75–70	3–0	Bradley Center; Milwaukee, WI
November 24*		Northern Michigan	W 70–58	4–0	Bradley Center; Milwaukee, WI
December 1*		No. 23 Notre Dame	W 71–58	5–0	Bradley Center; Milwaukee, WI
December 5*		Grambling	W 71–55	6–0	Bradley Center; Milwaukee, WI
December 13*		at No. 9 Arizona	L 75–85	6–1	McKale Center
December 15*		Canisius	W 68–65	7–1	Bradley Center; Milwaukee, WI
December 20*		No. 22 Wisconsin	L 59–63	7–2	Kohl Center; Madison, WI
December 22*		Florida A&M	W 83–63	8–2	Bradley Center; Milwaukee, WI
December 29*		Sacred Heart	W 77–72	9–2	Bradley Center; Milwaukee, WI
January 7		at Houston	W 65–52	10–2 (1–0)	Hofheinz Pavilion; Houston, Texas
January 10		St. Louis	W 61–59	11–2 (2–0)	Bradley Center; Milwaukee, WI
January 14		No. 10 Cincinnati	L 73–85	11–3 (2–1)	Bradley Center; Milwaukee, WI
January 17		vs. Southern Mississippi	L 61–83	11–4 (2–2)	Resch Center; Ashwaubenon, WI
January 20		at Charlotte	L 76–84	11–5 (2–3)	Dale F. Halton Arena; Charlotte, NC
January 24		DePaul	W 70–62	12–5 (3–3)	Bradley Center; Milwaukee, WI
January 31		at No. 4 Louisville	W 77–70	13–5 (4–3)	Freedom Hall; Louisville, Kentucky
February 3		TCU	L 79–85	13–6 (4–4)	Bradley Center; Milwaukee, WI
February 7		at DePaul	L 78–84	13–7 (4–5)	Allstate Arena; Rosemont, Illinois
February 14		Memphis	L 71–89	13–8 (4–6)	Bradley Center; Milwaukee, WI
February 18		at St. Louis	L 54–58	13–9 (4–7)	Scottrade Center; St. Louis, Missouri
February 21		Tulane	W 81–69	14–9 (5–7)	Bradley Center; Milwaukee, WI
February 26		at USF	W 70–63	15–9 (6–7)	Sun Dome; Tampa, Florida
February 28		at UAB	L 69–87	15–10 (6–8)	Bartow Arena; Birmingham, Alabama
March 3		East Carolina	W 77–73	16–10 (7–8)	Bradley Center; Milwaukee, WI
March 6		No. 25 Louisville	W 81–80	17–10 (8–8)	Bradley Center; Milwaukee, WI
Conference USA tournament
March 10		vs. TCU	L 62–64	17–11 (8–8)	Riverfront Coliseum; Cincinnati, Ohio
NIT
March 15*		Toledo	W 87–72	18–11 (8–8)	Bradley Center; Milwaukee, WI
March 23*		Boise State	W 66–53	19–11 (8–8)	Bradley Center; Milwaukee, WI
March 25*		at Iowa State	L 69–77	19–12 (8–8)	James H. Hilton Coliseum; Ames, Iowa
*Non-conference game. ^{#}Rankings from AP Poll. (#) Tournament seedings in parentheses.
