= Dean Keener =

American basketball player & coach (born 1965)

Biographical details
- Born: September 18, 1965 (age 61); Tallmadge, Ohio, U.S.

Playing career
- 1984–1988: Davidson

Coaching career (HC unless noted)
- 1988–1990: Drake (assistant)
- 1990–1991: USC (assistant)
- 1991–1995: Virginia Tech (assistant)
- 1995–1997: SMU (assistant)
- 1997–1999: Virginia Tech (assistant)
- 1999–2000: James Madison (assistant)
- 2000–2004: Georgia Tech (assistant)
- 2004–2008: James Madison

Dean Keener (born September 18, 1965) is the former head coach for the men's basketball team at James Madison University. He is a 1988 graduate of Davidson College where he served as a team captain and played on Davidson's 1986 NCAA Tournament team. Keener was hired on April 1, 2004. Keener previously held coaching positions at Drake University, Southern California, Virginia Tech, SMU, and Georgia Tech. Keener played an instrumental role in recruiting and developing many of the players on the 2004 national runner-up Georgia Tech squad. Keener resigned from his coaching position at JMU on February 22, 2008. After his resignation, he continued to coach for the remainder of the 2008 season. During his 20-year coaching career, he coached and/or recruited 12 players that played in the NBA, including Chris Bosh, Jarrett Jack, Anthony Morrow and Will Bynum. He is currently a color analyst for ESPN and CBS Sports Network.

Dean and his wife Meg have two children, Julia and Kyle.
