= Antonio Burks (basketball, born 1980) =

American basketball player (born 1980)

Personal information
- Born: February 25, 1980 (age 46) Memphis, Tennessee, U.S.
- Listed height: 6 ft 1 in (1.85 m)
- Listed weight: 200 lb (91 kg)

Career information
- High school: Booker T. Washington (Memphis, Tennessee)
- College: Hiwassee (2000–2001); Memphis (2001–2004)
- NBA draft: 2004: 2nd round, 36th overall pick
- Drafted by: Orlando Magic
- Playing career: 2004–2009
- Position: Point guard
- Number: 1

Career history
- 2004–2006: Memphis Grizzlies
- 2006–2007: Crvena zvezda
- 2007–2008: Lukoil Academic
- 2009: Czarni Słupsk

Career highlights
- Conference USA Player of the Year (2004); First-team All-Conference USA (2004)
- Stats at NBA.com
- Stats at Basketball Reference

Antonio Cornell Burks (born February 25, 1980) is an American former professional basketball player who played in the National Basketball Association (NBA) and Europe. At 6 ft 0 in (1.83 m), he played as a guard. Burks played at Booker T. Washington High School in Memphis, then one year at Hiwassee Junior College in Madisonville, Tennessee before joining the University of Memphis as an invited walk-on. He helped the Tigers win the NIT in 2002. His senior year he was named the Conference USA player of the year.

After a career at the University of Memphis, he was a second round draft pick of the Orlando Magic in the 2004 NBA draft. He was then traded to his hometown Memphis Grizzlies in exchange for cash considerations. Burks averaged three points in 24 games in his rookie season. After appearing in four games for the Miami Heat during the 2006 preseason, he was signed by them on October 2, 2006. but was waived on October 26, prior to the beginning of the 2006–07 NBA season.

Burks later played with KK Crvena zvezda of the Serbian basketball league. He signed with Lukoil Academic in Bulgaria in August 2007. According to a eurobasket.com report, Burks was banned for a season from FIBA, because KK Crvena zvezda had informed them that Burks had broken the rules of his contract by leaving 20 days earlier.

On July 20, 2009, Burks was shot by a robber in Memphis. Burks underwent several surgeries and recovered in the hospital. The man who shot him was convicted of attempted second-degree murder and other charges and was sentenced to 97 years in prison; he will become eligible for parole in 2050. He had been released on probation for another crime only a month before shooting Burks.

Burks became an assistant coach for LeMoyne-Owen College in 2010.

Burks formed a lawn care business, Antonio Burks Star Maintenance and Lawn Services, in 2013.
