= 2003–04 NCAA Division I men's basketball rankings =

- Season: 2003–04
- NCAA Tournament: 2004
- Preseason No. 1: Connecticut
- NCAA Tournament Champions: Connecticut
NCAA Division I men's basketball rankings


The 2003–04 NCAA Division I men's basketball rankings was made up of two human polls, the AP Poll and the Coaches Poll, in addition to various other preseason polls.

== Legend ==
	Increase in ranking
	Decrease in ranking
	New to rankings from previous week
Italics	Number of first place votes
(#–#)	Win–loss record
т	Tied with team above or below also with this symbol

== AP Poll ==
	Preseason	Week 2 Nov. 26	Week 3 Dec. 3	Week 4 Dec. 10	Week 5 Dec. 17	Week 6 Dec. 24	Week 7 Dec. 31	Week 8 Jan. 7	Week 9 Jan. 14	Week 10 Jan. 21	Week 11 Jan. 28	Week 12 Feb. 4	Week 13 Feb. 11	Week 14 Feb. 18	Week 15 Feb. 25	Week 16 Mar. 3	Week 17 Mar. 10	Final Mar. 17	
1.	Connecticut (69)	Connecticut (3–0) (69)	Kansas (2–0) (52)	Florida (5–0) (46)	Connecticut (7–1) (21)	Connecticut (8–1) (21)	Connecticut (9–1) (37)	Connecticut (11–1) (50)	Connecticut (13–1) (52)	Duke (14–1) (45)	Duke (16–1) (44)	Duke (18–1) (44)	Duke (20–1) (43)	Stanford (21–0) (64)	Stanford (23–0) (64)	Stanford (25–0) (67)	Saint Joseph's (27–0) (67)	Stanford (29–1)	1.
2.	Duke (1)	Duke (1–0) (1)	Florida (2–0) (8)	Connecticut (6–1) (9)	Kentucky (5–0) (26)	Kentucky (6–0) (25)	Duke (8–1) (5)	Duke (10–1) (5)	Duke (12–1) (4)	Stanford (14–0) (24)	Stanford (16–0) (26)	Stanford (18–0) (26)	Stanford (20–0) (27)	Saint Joseph's (22–0) (8)	Saint Joseph's (24–0) (8)	Saint Joseph's (26–0) (5)	Stanford (26–1) (2)	Kentucky (26–4)	2.
3.	Michigan State (1)	Michigan State (1–0) (1)	Connecticut (4–1) (1)	Missouri (3–0) (6)	Duke (6–1) (1)	Duke (8–1) (2)	Georgia Tech (11–0) (21)	Arizona (9–1) (5)	Stanford (13–0) (11)	Saint Joseph's (15–0) (1)	Saint Joseph's (17–0) (2)	Saint Joseph's (18–0) (2)	Saint Joseph's (20–0) (12)	Duke (21–2)	Pittsburgh (24–2)	Duke (24–3)	Gonzaga (25–2) (1)	Gonzaga (27–2)	3.
4.	Arizona	Arizona (0–0)	Missouri (1–0) (3)	Duke (5–1)	North Carolina (6–0) (6)	Georgia Tech (10–0) (16)	Arizona (7–1) (4)	Stanford (11–0) (5)	Wake Forest (11–0) (5)	Connecticut (14–2)	Louisville (15–1)	Pittsburgh (20–1)	Pittsburgh (22–1)	Mississippi State (21–1)	Gonzaga (23–2)	Gonzaga (25–2)	Mississippi State (25–2)	Oklahoma State (27–3)	4.
5.	Missouri	Missouri (0–0)	Michigan State (3–1)	Kansas (3–1)	Georgia Tech (8–0) (14)	Arizona (5–1) (2)	Stanford (9–0) (3)	Wake Forest (9–0) (5)	Kentucky (10–1)	Louisville (13–1)	Kentucky (13–2)	Connecticut (17–3)	Connecticut (19–3)	Pittsburgh (23–2)	Duke (22–3)	Mississippi State (23–2)	Duke (25–4) (2)	Saint Joseph's (27–1)	5.
6.	Kansas (1)	Kansas (1–0) (1)	Duke (3–1) (1)	Texas (4–0) (3)	Kansas (5–1)	Stanford (7–0) (2)	Wake Forest (7–0) (1)	Oklahoma (10–0) (2)	Saint Joseph's (13–0)	Cincinnati (13–0) (2)	Connecticut (15–3)	Louisville (16–2)	Mississippi State (19–1)	Gonzaga (21–2)	Oklahoma State (21–2)	Pittsburgh (25–3)	Pittsburgh (27–3)	Duke (27–5)	6.
7.	Syracuse	Syracuse (0–0)	Arizona (1–1)	North Carolina (5–0) (3)	Arizona (4–1) (2)	Oklahoma (8–0)	Oklahoma (8–0)	Kentucky (9–1)	Arizona (10–2)	North Carolina (11–3)	Pittsburgh (19–1)	Mississippi State (18–1)	Gonzaga (19–2)	Oklahoma State (19–2)	Mississippi State (21–2)	Connecticut (23–5)	Oklahoma State (24–3)	Connecticut (27–6)	7.
8.	Florida	Florida (0–0)	Texas (3–0) (2)	Kentucky (4–0) (1)	Oklahoma (7–0)	Wake Forest (7–0) (1)	Kentucky (7–1)	Georgia Tech (12–1)	Louisville (11–1)	Pittsburgh (18–0)	Cincinnati (14–1)	Gonzaga (17–2)	Kentucky (16–3)	Connecticut (19–5)	Connecticut (21–5)	Oklahoma State (22–3)	Kentucky (23–4)	Mississippi State (25–3)	8.
9.	North Carolina	North Carolina (1–0)	Kentucky (2–0) (1)	Arizona (2–1)	Stanford (5–0) (2)	North Carolina (6–1)	North Carolina (7–1)	Saint Joseph's (11–0)	North Carolina (10–2)	Kentucky (11–2)	Arizona (13–3)	Kentucky (14–3)	Louisville (17–3)	Kentucky (17–4)	Kentucky (19–4)	Kentucky (21–4)	Connecticut (24–6)	Pittsburgh (29–4)	9.
10.	Kentucky	Kentucky (1–0)	North Carolina (3–0) (1)	Georgia Tech (7–0) (4)	Missouri (3–1)	Saint Joseph's (8–0)	Saint Joseph's (9–0)	Louisville (9–1)	Cincinnati (11–0)	Wake Forest (11–2)	Gonzaga (15–2)	Cincinnati (15–2)	Oklahoma State (17–2)	Louisville (17–4)	Texas (19–4)	Texas (21–4)	Wisconsin (21–6)	Wisconsin (24–6)	10.
11.	Texas	Texas (1–0)	Illinois (3–0)	Oklahoma (5–0)	Saint Joseph's (7–0) т	Missouri (4–1)	Louisville (7–1)	Cincinnati (9–0)	Oklahoma (10–1)	Georgia Tech (14–2)	Mississippi State (16–1)	Texas (14–3)	Texas (16–3)	Texas (17–4)	Wake Forest (17–6)	Wake Forest (19–6)	Texas (21–6)	Cincinnati (24–6)	11.
12.	Illinois	Illinois (1–0)	Saint Joseph's (3–0)	Saint Joseph's (5–0)	Texas (5–1) т	Kansas (6–2)	Cincinnati (8–0)	North Carolina (8–2)	Georgia Tech (12–2)	Kansas (11–2)	North Carolina (12–4)	Arizona (14–4)	Kansas (15–4)	Wisconsin (17–4)	North Carolina (16–7)	Providence (20–5)	Illinois (22–5)	Texas (23–7)	12.
13.	Saint Joseph's	Saint Joseph's (1–0)	Georgia Tech (3–0)	Stanford (4–0)	Gonzaga (7–1)	Florida (6–2)	Kansas (6–2)	Kansas (8–2)	Pittsburgh (16–0)	Syracuse (13–1)	Texas Tech (16–2)	Oklahoma State (15–2)	Cincinnati (16–3)	NC State (16–5)	Providence (18–5)	Cincinnati (20–5)	Cincinnati (21–6)	Illinois (24–6)	13.
14.	Oklahoma	Oklahoma (2–0)	Oklahoma (3–0)	Illinois (4–1)	Wake Forest (5–0)	Cincinnati (6–0)	Florida (8–2)	Florida (9–2)	Kansas (9–2)	Arizona (11–3)	Georgia Tech (15–3)	Wisconsin (14–3)	North Carolina (14–6)	Arizona (16–6)	NC State (17–6)	North Carolina (17–8)	Georgia Tech (22–8)	Georgia Tech (23–9)	14.
15.	Wisconsin	Wisconsin (1–0)	Wisconsin (3–0)	Wake Forest (5–0)	Florida (5–2)	Gonzaga (7–2)	Pittsburgh (12–0)	Pittsburgh (14–0)	Florida (11–2)	Gonzaga (14–2)	Kansas (12–3)	Georgia Tech (16–4)	Georgia Tech (17–5)	Wake Forest (15–6)	Cincinnati (18–5)	Southern Illinois (24–2)	Wake Forest (19–8)	NC State (20–9)	15.
16.	Gonzaga	Gonzaga (1–1)	Syracuse (1–1)	Purdue (6–0)	Cincinnati (4–0)	Pittsburgh (10–0)	Gonzaga (8–2)	Gonzaga (10–2)	Gonzaga (12–2)	Texas (11–2)	Texas (12–3)	Wake Forest (13–4)	Arizona (14–6)	North Carolina (15–7)	Southern Illinois (22–2)	NC State (18–7)	North Carolina (18–9)	Kansas (21–8)	16.
17.	Louisville	Louisville (0–0)	Gonzaga (3–1)	Gonzaga (6–1)	Purdue (7–1)	Syracuse (5–1)	Syracuse (7–1)	Syracuse (9–1)	Syracuse (11–1)	Florida (11–3)	Wisconsin (13–3)	North Carolina (13–5)	Wisconsin (15–4)	Cincinnati (17–4)	Arizona (17–7)	Wisconsin (19–6)	NC State (19–8)	Wake Forest (19–9)	17.
18.	Cincinnati	Wake Forest (2–0)	Wake Forest (3–0)	Cincinnati (4–0)	Pittsburgh (7–0)	Texas (5–2)	Wisconsin (8–1)	Texas (7–2)	Texas (9–2)	Texas Tech (14–2)	Oklahoma State (14–2)	Syracuse (14–3)	Texas Tech (17–5)	Georgia Tech (18–6)	Georgia Tech (19–7)	Illinois (20–5)	Kansas (20–7)	North Carolina (18–10)	18.
19.	Wake Forest	Cincinnati (1–0)	Cincinnati (3–0)	Syracuse (2–1)	Syracuse (3–1)	Wisconsin (7–1)	Texas (5–2)	Illinois (9–2)	Wisconsin (11–2)	Mississippi State (14–1)	Wake Forest (11–4)	Texas Tech (16–4)	Utah State (19–1)	Providence (17–5)	Memphis (19–4)	Georgia Tech (20–8)	Syracuse (21–6)	Maryland (19–11)	19.
20.	Stanford	Stanford (1–0)	Purdue (4–0)	Pittsburgh (6–0)	Louisville (4–1)	Louisville (5–1)	Illinois (7–2)	Vanderbilt (11–0)	Mississippi State (13–0)	Oklahoma (10–3)	Syracuse (13–3)	Kansas (13–4)	Wake Forest (13–6)	Southern Illinois (20–2)	Kansas (17–6)	Memphis (20–5)	Providence (20–7)	Syracuse (21–7)	20.
21.	Notre Dame	Notre Dame (0–0)	Stanford (3–0)	Michigan State (3–3)	Illinois (6–2)	Illinois (6–2)	Purdue (9–2)	Wisconsin (9–2)	Marquette (11–2)	Wisconsin (11–3)	Purdue (14–4)	Florida (13–5)	NC State (14–5)	Kansas (15–6)	Louisville (17–6)	Kansas (18–7)	Arizona (19–8)	Providence (20–8)	21.
22.	Pittsburgh	Pittsburgh (2–0)	Pittsburgh (4–0)	Marquette (6–0)	Wisconsin (6–1)	Purdue (8–2)	Vanderbilt (9–0)	Mississippi State (11–0)	Texas Tech (13–2)	Vanderbilt (13–2)	Florida (12–4)	Oklahoma (13–4)	Florida (14–6)	Texas Tech (18–6)	Wisconsin (17–6)	Arizona (18–8)	Utah State (25–2)	Arizona (20–9)	22.
23.	Marquette	Marquette (3–0)	Notre Dame (2–0)	Wisconsin (4–1)	Marquette (6–1)	Dayton (9–0)	Missouri (4–3)	Marquette (9–2)	Vanderbilt (12–1)	Purdue (12–4)	Providence (13–3)	Providence (14–4)	Southern Illinois (18–2)	Memphis (18–4)	Illinois (18–5)	Utah State (24–2)	Memphis (21–6)	Southern Illinois (25–4)	23.
24.	NC State	Oklahoma State (1–0)	Marquette (4–0)	Iowa (5–0)	Dayton (8–0)	Maryland (6–2)	Mississippi State (10–0)	Purdue (10–3)	Creighton (12–0)	Oklahoma State (12–2)	South Carolina (17–2)	Utah State (17–1)	Providence (15–5)	LSU (17–4)	Utah State (22–2)	Syracuse (19–6)	Southern Illinois (25–4)	Memphis (21–7)	24.
25.	Oklahoma State	NC State (1–0)	Oklahoma State (3–0)	Dayton (6–0)	Maryland (6–2)	Vanderbilt (8–0)	Marquette (8–2)	Providence (8–1)	Illinois (10–3)	South Carolina (16–2)	Oklahoma (11–4)	South Carolina (18–3)	South Carolina (19–4)	South Carolina (20–5)	Texas Tech (19–7)	Louisville (18–7)	Air Force (22–5)	Utah State (25–3) т Boston College (23–9) т	25.
	Preseason	Week 2 Nov. 26	Week 3 Dec. 3	Week 4 Dec. 10	Week 5 Dec. 17	Week 6 Dec. 24	Week 7 Dec. 31	Week 8 Jan. 7	Week 9 Jan. 14	Week 10 Jan. 21	Week 11 Jan. 28	Week 12 Feb. 4	Week 13 Feb. 11	Week 14 Feb. 18	Week 15 Feb. 25	Week 16 Mar. 3	Week 17 Mar. 10	Final Mar. 17	
		None	Dropped: Louisville; NC State	Dropped: Notre Dame; Oklahoma State	Dropped: Michigan State; Iowa	Dropped: Marquette	Dropped: Dayton; Maryland	Dropped: Missouri	Dropped: Purdue; Providence	Dropped: Marquette; Creighton; Illinois	Dropped: Vanderbilt	Dropped: Purdue	Dropped: Syracuse; Oklahoma	Dropped: Utah State; Florida	Dropped: LSU; South Carolina	Dropped: Texas Tech	Dropped: Louisville	Dropped: Air Force (22–6)	

== Coaches Poll ==
	Preseason	Week 2 Nov. 25	Week 3 Dec. 2	Week 4 Dec. 9	Week 5 Dec. 16	Week 6 Dec. 23	Week 7 Dec. 30	Week 8 Jan. 6	Week 9 Jan. 13	Week 10 Jan. 20	Week 11 Jan. 27	Week 12 Feb. 3	Week 13 Feb. 10	Week 14 Feb. 17	Week 15 Feb. 24	Week 16 Mar. 2	Week 17 Mar. 9	Week 18 Mar. 16	Final Apr. 6	
1.	Connecticut (25)	Connecticut (3–0) (27)	Kansas (2–0) (25)	Florida (5–0) (20)	Kentucky (5–0) (23)	Kentucky (6–0) (25)	Connecticut (9–1) (18)	Connecticut (11–1) (24)	Connecticut (13–1) (24)	Duke (14–1) (25)	Duke (16–1) (24)	Duke (18–1) (24)	Duke (20–1) (24)	Stanford (21–0) (26)	Stanford (23–0) (26)	Stanford (25–0) (27)	Saint Joseph's (27–0) (31)	Stanford (29–1)	Connecticut (33–6) (31)	1.
2.	Duke (3)	Duke (1–0) (2)	Florida (2–0) (2)	Kentucky (4–0) (2)	Connecticut (7–1) (4)	Connecticut (8–1) (4)	Duke (8–1) (6)	Duke (10–1) (3)	Duke (12–1) (2)	Stanford (14–0) (5)	Stanford (16–0) (6)	Stanford (18–0) (6)	Stanford (20–0) (6)	Saint Joseph's (22–0) (4)	Saint Joseph's (24–0) (5)	Saint Joseph's (26–0) (4)	Stanford (26–1)	Gonzaga (27–2)	Duke (31–6)	2.
3.	Michigan State (1)	Arizona (0–0)	Kentucky (2–0)	Connecticut (6–1) (4)	Duke (6–1)	Duke (8–1)	Georgia Tech (11–0) (5)	Arizona (9–1) (1)	Wake Forest (11–0) (3)	Saint Joseph's (15–0) (1)	Saint Joseph's (17–0) (1)	Saint Joseph's (19–0) (1)	Saint Joseph's (20–0) (1)	Duke (21–2) (1)	Pittsburgh (24–2)	Duke (24–3)	Gonzaga (25–2)	Oklahoma State (27–3)	Georgia Tech (28–10)	3.
4.	Arizona	Michigan State (1–0)	Connecticut (4–1) (1)	Missouri (3–0)	North Carolina (6–0) (1)	Georgia Tech (10–0) (2)	Arizona (7–1)	Wake Forest (9–0) (2)	Stanford (13–0) (1)	Connecticut (14–2)	Louisville (15–1)	Pittsburgh (20–1)	Pittsburgh (22–1)	Pittsburgh (23–2)	Duke (22–3)	Gonzaga (25–2)	Duke (25–4)	Kentucky (26–4)	Oklahoma State (31–4)	4.
5.	Kansas	Kansas (1–0)	Missouri (1–0) (1)	Duke (5–1)	Arizona (4–1)	Arizona (5–1)	Wake Forest (7–0) (1)	Kentucky (9–1)	Kentucky (10–1)	Cincinnati (13–0)	Kentucky (13–2)	Connecticut (17–3)	Connecticut (19–3)	Mississippi State (21–1)	Gonzaga (23–2)	Mississippi State (23–2)	Mississippi State (25–2)	Saint Joseph's (27–1)	Saint Joseph's (30–2)	5.
6.	Missouri	Missouri (0–0)	Duke (3–1) т	Texas (4–0) (2)	Georgia Tech (8–0) (3)	Wake Forest (7–0)	Kentucky (7–1)	Stanford (11–0)	Saint Joseph's (13–0) (1)	Louisville (13–1)	Pittsburgh (19–1)	Louisville (16–2)	Mississippi State (19–1)	Gonzaga (21–2)	Oklahoma State (21–2)	Pittsburgh (25–3)	Pittsburgh (27–3)	Duke (27–5)	Stanford (30–2)	6.
7.	Syracuse (1)	Syracuse (0–0) (1)	Michigan State (3–1) т	Kansas (3–1)	Kansas (5–1)	Oklahoma (8–0)	Stanford (9–0)	Oklahoma (10–0)	Cincinnati (11–0)	Wake Forest (11–2)	Cincinnati (14–1)	Mississippi State (18–1)	Gonzaga (19–2)	Oklahoma State (19–2)	Mississippi State (21–2)	Oklahoma State (22–3)	Oklahoma State (24–3)	Connecticut (27–6)	Pittsburgh (31–5)	7.
8.	Florida	Florida (0–0)	Arizona (1–1)	North Carolina (5–0) (1)	Oklahoma (7–0)	Stanford (7–0)	Oklahoma (8–0)	Georgia Tech (12–1)	Arizona (10–2)	Kentucky (11–2)	Connecticut (15–3)	Gonzaga (17–2)	Kentucky (16–3)	Connecticut (19–5)	Connecticut (21–5)	Connecticut (23–5)	Kentucky (23–4)	Pittsburgh (29–4)	Kentucky (27–5)	8.
9.	Kentucky	Kentucky (1–0)	Texas (3–0)	Arizona (2–1)	Wake Forest (5–0)	North Carolina (6–1)	North Carolina (7–1)	Saint Joseph's (11–0)	Louisville (11–1)	Pittsburgh (18–0)	Arizona (13–3)	Kentucky (14–3)	Louisville (17–3)	Kentucky (17–4)	Kentucky (19–4)	Kentucky (21–4)	Connecticut (24–6)	Mississippi State (25–3)	Kansas (24–9)	9.
10.	North Carolina (1)	North Carolina (1–0) (1)	North Carolina (1–0) (1)	Georgia Tech (7–0) (2)	Texas (5–1)	Saint Joseph's (8–0)	Saint Joseph's (9–0) (1)	Cincinnati (9–0)	Florida (11–2)	Kansas (11–2)	Gonzaga (15–2)	Cincinnati (15–2)	Oklahoma State (17–2)	Wisconsin (17–4)	Texas (19–4)	Texas (21–4)	Wisconsin (21–6)	Wisconsin (24–6)	Texas (25–8)	10.
11.	Texas	Texas (1–0)	Illinois (3–0)	Oklahoma (5–0)	Stanford (5–0)	Kansas (6–2)	Cincinnati (8–0)	Florida (9–2)	North Carolina (10–2)	North Carolina (11–3)	Mississippi State (16–1)	Wisconsin (14–3)	Texas (16–3)	Louisville (17–4)	Wake Forest (17–6)	Wake Forest (19–6)	Texas (21–6)	Texas (23–7)	Illinois (26–7)	11.
12.	Gonzaga	Illinois (1–0)	Oklahoma (3–0)	Wake Forest (5–0)	Saint Joseph's (7–0)	Cincinnati (6–0)	Florida (8–2)	Louisville (9–1)	Kansas (9–2)	Arizona (11–3)	Kansas (12–3)	Arizona (14–4)	Cincinnati (16–3)	Texas (17–4)	Cincinnati (18–5)	Cincinnati (20–5)	Cincinnati (21–6)	Cincinnati (24–6)	Gonzaga (28–3)	12.
13.	Illinois	Oklahoma (2–0)	Wisconsin (3–0)	Stanford (4–0)	Florida (5–2)	Florida (6–2)	Kansas (6–2)	North Carolina (8–2)	Oklahoma (10–1)	Georgia Tech (14–2)	Wisconsin (13–3)	Oklahoma State (15–2)	Kansas (15–4)	Arizona (16–6)	Providence (18–5)	Providence (20–5)	Illinois (22–5)	Illinois (24–6)	Mississippi State (26–4)	13.
14.	Wisconsin	Saint Joseph's (1–0)	Saint Joseph's (3–0)	Illinois (4–1)	Missouri (3–1)	Missouri (4–1)	Louisville (7–1)	Kansas (8–2)	Georgia Tech (12–2)	Texas (11–2)	Texas Tech (16–2)	Texas (14–3)	Wisconsin (15–4)	Cincinnati (17–4)	Arizona (17–7)	Wisconsin (19–6)	Wake Forest (19–8)	Kansas (21–8)	Xavier (26–11)	14.
15.	Oklahoma	Wisconsin (1–0)	Georgia Tech (5–0)	Saint Joseph's (5–0)	Gonzaga (7–1)	Wisconsin (7–1)	Wisconsin (8–1)	Pittsburgh (14–0)	Pittsburgh (16–0)	Gonzaga (14–2)	North Carolina (12–4)	Wake Forest (13–4)	Arizona (14–6)	Wake Forest (15–6)	Wisconsin (17–6)	Southern Illinois (24–2)	Kansas (20–7)	Georgia Tech (23–9)	Wake Forest (21–10)	15.
16.	Louisville	Louisville (0–0)	Wake Forest (3–0)	Purdue (6–0)	Cincinnati (4–0)	Texas (5–2)	Pittsburgh (12–0)	Texas (7–2)	Texas (9–2)	Syracuse (13–1)	Georgia Tech (15–3)	Georgia Tech (16–4)	Georgia Tech (17–5)	Georgia Tech (18–6)	North Carolina (16–7)	North Carolina (17–8)	Arizona (19–8)	Wake Forest (19–9)	Wisconsin (25–7)	16.
17.	Stanford	Stanford (1–0)	Stanford (3–0)	Cincinnati (4–0)	Purdue (7–1)	Pittsburgh (10–0)	Texas (5–2)	Gonzaga (10–2)	Gonzaga (12–2)	Florida (11–3)	Wake Forest (11–4)	Kansas (13–4)	North Carolina (14–6)	Providence (17–5)	Southern Illinois (22–2)	Arizona (18–8)	Providence (20–7)	NC State (20–9)	Alabama (20–13)	17.
18.	Saint Joseph's	Wake Forest (2–0)	Syracuse (1–1)	Gonzaga (6–1)	Wisconsin (6–1)	Gonzaga (7–2)	Gonzaga (8–2)	Wisconsin (9–2)	Wisconsin (11–2)	Texas Tech (14–2)	Texas (12–3)	Texas Tech (16–4)	Wake Forest (13–6)	NC State (16–5)	Kansas (17–6)	Kansas (18–7)	Georgia Tech (22–8)	Arizona (20–9)	Cincinnati (25–7)	18.
19.	Cincinnati т	Cincinnati (1–0)	Cincinnati (3–0)	Wisconsin (4–1)	Illinois (6–2)	Illinois (6–2)	Illinois (7–2)	Syracuse (9–1)	Syracuse (11–1)	Wisconsin (11–3)	Oklahoma State (14–2)	North Carolina (13–5)	Texas Tech (17–5)	North Carolina (15–7)	NC State (17–6)	NC State (18–7)	North Carolina (18–9)	Providence (20–8)	Syracuse (23–8)	19.
20.	Notre Dame т	Notre Dame (0–0)	Notre Dame (2–0)	Michigan State (3–3)	Pittsburgh (7–0)	Louisville (5–1)	Syracuse (7–1)	Illinois (9–2)	Creighton (12–0)	Mississippi State (14–1)	Florida (12–4)	Syracuse (14–3)	Florida (14–6)	Kansas (15–6)	Georgia Tech (19–7)	Illinois (20–5)	NC State (19–8)	North Carolina (18–10)	NC State (21–10)	20.
21.	Wake Forest	Gonzaga (1–1)	Purdue (5–0)	Marquette (6–0) т	Syracuse (3–1)	Syracuse (5–1)	Purdue (9–2)	Vanderbilt (11–0)	Marquette (11–2)	Oklahoma (10–3)	Purdue (14–4)	Florida (13–5)	Providence (15–5)	Southern Illinois (20–2)	Louisville (17–6)	Utah State (24–2)	Utah State (25–2)	Maryland (19–11)	Nevada (25–9)	21.
22.	Pittsburgh	Pittsburgh (2–0)	Pittsburgh (4–0)	Syracuse (2–1) т	Louisville (4–1)	Purdue (8–2)	Missouri (4–3)	Marquette (9–2)	Texas Tech (13–2)	Vanderbilt (13–2)	Syracuse (13–3)	Oklahoma (13–4)	South Carolina (19–4)	South Carolina (20–5)	Memphis (19–4)	Georgia Tech (20–8)	Southern Illinois (25–4)	Utah State (25–3)	North Carolina (19–11)	22.
23.	Marquette	Marquette (3–0)	Marquette (4–0)	Pittsburgh (6–0)	Marquette (6–1)	Dayton (9–0)	Marquette (8–2)	Creighton (9–0)	Vanderbilt (12–1)	Purdue (12–4)	South Carolina (17–2)	Providence (14–4)	Utah State (19–1)	Texas Tech (18–6)	Utah State (22–2)	Memphis (20–5)	Syracuse (21–6)	Southern Illinois (25–4)	UAB (22–10)	23.
24.	Oklahoma State	Maryland (1–0)	Gonzaga (3–1)	Dayton (6–0)	Dayton (8–0)	Marquette (7–2)	Vanderbilt (9–0)	Oklahoma State (9–1)	Mississippi State (13–0)	Creighton (13–1)	Providence (13–3)	South Carolina (18–3)	Southern Illinois (18–2)	Syracuse (16–5)	Illinois (18–5)	Louisville (18–7)	Memphis (21–6)	Syracuse (21–7)	Maryland (20–12)	24.
25.	Maryland	Texas Tech (3–0)	Maryland (3–0)	Louisville (2–1)	Michigan State (3–4)	Maryland (6–2)	Florida State (11–1)	Texas Tech (12–2) т Purdue (10–3) т	Illinois (10–3)	Oklahoma State (12–2)	Oklahoma (11–4)	Vanderbilt (14–4)	Syracuse (14–5)	Utah State (20–2)	Texas Tech (19–7)	Michigan State (17–9)	Air Force (22–5)	Michigan State (18–11)	Vanderbilt (23–10)	25.
	Preseason	Week 2 Nov. 25	Week 3 Dec. 2	Week 4 Dec. 9	Week 5 Dec. 16	Week 6 Dec. 23	Week 7 Dec. 30	Week 8 Jan. 6	Week 9 Jan. 13	Week 10 Jan. 20	Week 11 Jan. 27	Week 12 Feb. 3	Week 13 Feb. 10	Week 14 Feb. 17	Week 15 Feb. 24	Week 16 Mar. 2	Week 17 Mar. 9	Week 18 Mar. 16	Final Apr. 6	
		Dropped: Oklahoma State	Dropped: Louisville; Texas Tech	Dropped: Notre Dame; Maryland	None	Dropped: Michigan State	Dropped: Dayton; Maryland	Dropped: Missouri; Florida State	Dropped: Oklahoma State; Purdue	Dropped: Marquette; Illinois	Dropped: Vanderbilt; Creighton	Dropped: Purdue	Dropped: Oklahoma; Vanderbilt	Dropped: Florida	Dropped: South Carolina; Syracuse	Dropped: Texas Tech	Dropped: Louisville; Michigan State	Dropped: Memphis; Air Force	Dropped: Arizona (20–10); Providence (20–9); Utah State (25–4); Southern Illinois (25–5); Michigan State (18–12)	
