= List of Oklahoma Sooners head basketball coaches =

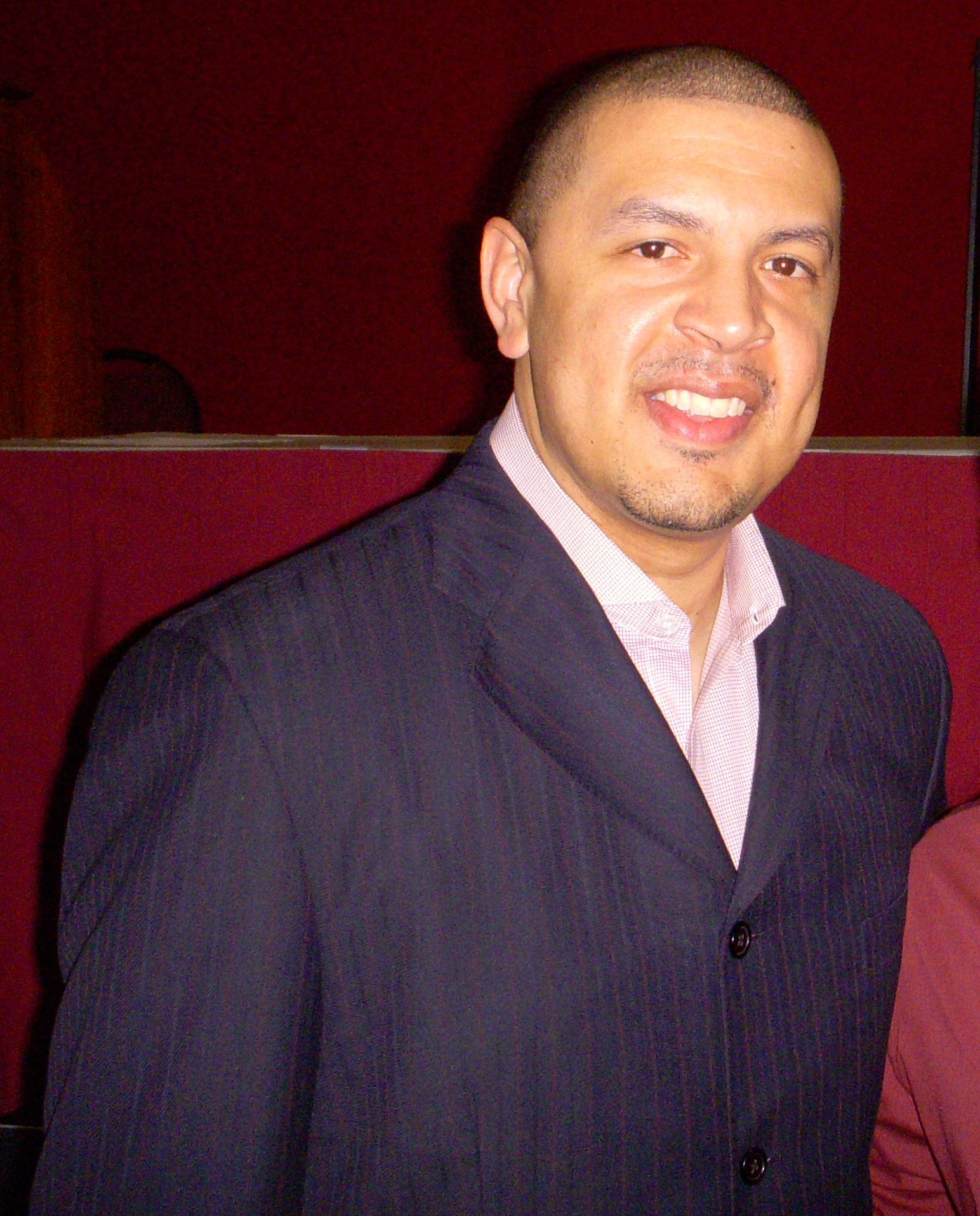
Jeff Capel, the head coach of the men's basketball program from 2006–07 to 2010–11.

The Oklahoma Sooners men's basketball and women's basketball programs are college basketball teams that represents the University of Oklahoma. Both teams play at the Division I level of the National Collegiate Athletic Association (NCAA).

The men's team has had 12 head coaches—excluding a coach who died before ever coaching a game, Lester Lane. (Note: Les Lane was hired to coach the men's basketball team in April 1973 but he died on September 5, 1973, before the start of the 1973–74 season.) Oklahoma started organized basketball with the nickname Sooners in 1908. The men's program has played in more than 2,400 games in a total of 102 seasons. In those seasons, five coaches have led the Sooners to at least one postseason tournament: Bruce Drake, Dave Bliss, Billy Tubbs, Kelvin Sampson and Jeff Capel. Five coaches have won conference championships with the Sooners: Hugh McDermott, Drake, Bliss, Tubbs and Sampson. McDermott and Drake both have had the longest tenure at Oklahoma. Tubbs is the all-time leader in games coached and wins. Sampson is the all-time leader in winning percentage. Statistically, Bob Stevens has been the least successful coach of the Sooner men, with a winning percentage of .368. Drake is the only Oklahoma coach who has been inducted into the Basketball Hall of Fame. The most recent men's coach was Jeff Capel, who was hired in 2006 and served until 2011.

The women's program has had nine head coaches. Oklahoma started an organized women's basketball program in 1974. The women have played in more than 1,000 games in a total of 25 seasons. In those seasons, three coaches have led the Sooners to at least one postseason tournament: Maura McHugh, Burl Plunkett, and Sherri Coale. Coale is the only coach who has won conference championships with the Sooners. Hired in April 1996, Coale is the all-time leader in games coached, wins and winning percentage. Statistically, Amy Dahl has been the worst coach of the Lady Sooners, with a winning percentage of .125.

== Key ==
General
#	Number of coaches (Note: A running total of the number of coaches of the Sooners. Thus, any coach who has two or more separate terms as head coach is counted only once.)
CCs	Conference championships
*	Conference-tournament champion
^	Regular-season champion
†	Elected to the Basketball Hall of Fame

Overall
GC	Games coached
OW	Wins
OL	Losses
O%	Winning percentage

Conference
CW	Wins
CL	Losses
C%	Winning percentage

Post-season
PW	Wins
PL	Losses

== Coaches ==
Statistics are correct as of the end of the 2009–10 men's and women's college basketball season.

=== Men's ===
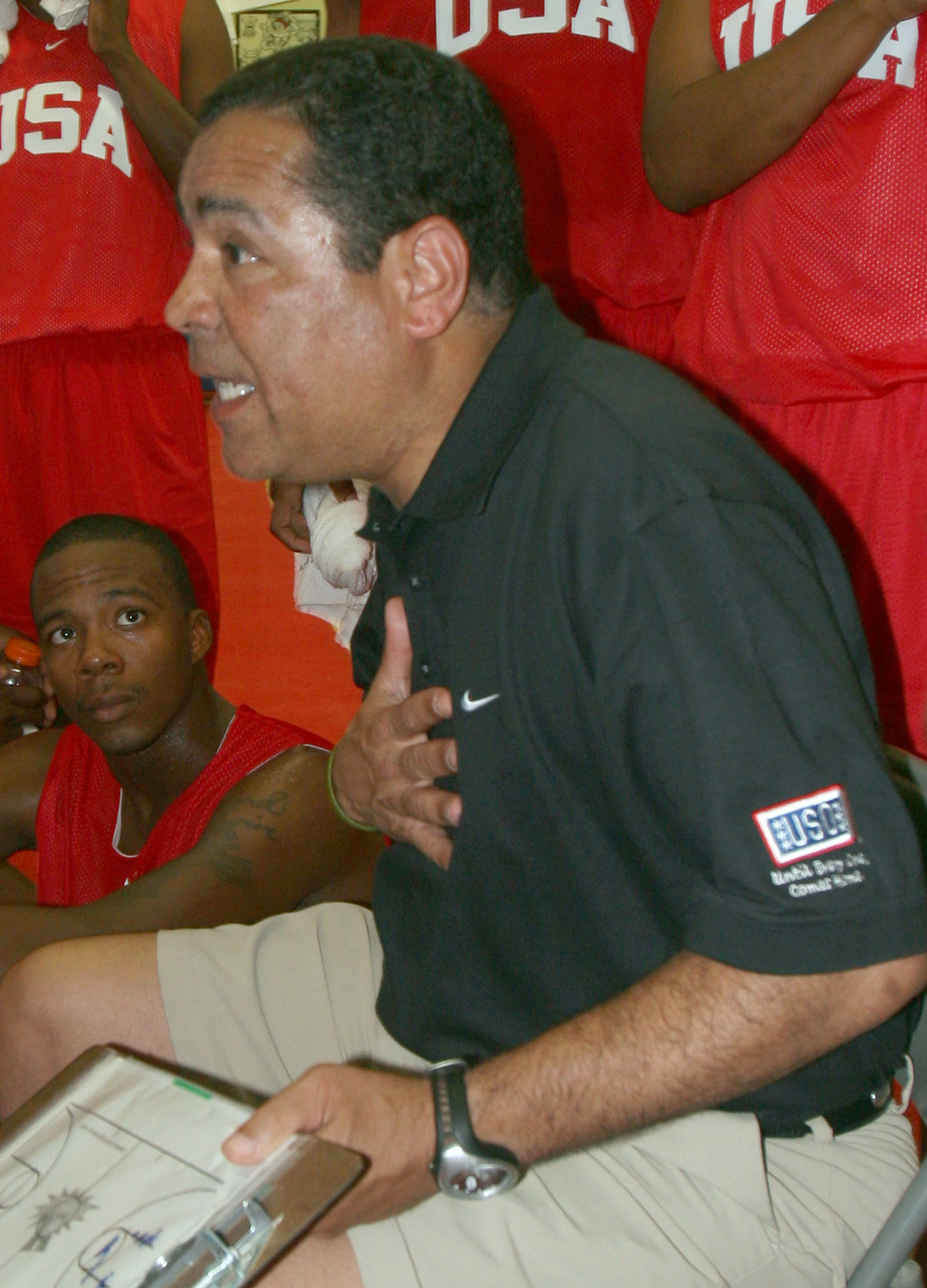
Former coach Kelvin Sampson

#	Name	Term	GC	OW	OL	O%	CW	CL	C%	PW	PL	CCs	National awards
1	David Hall	1908	7	4	3	.571	—	—	—	—	—	—	—
2	Bennie Owen	1909–1921	152	104	48	.684	8	16	.333	—	—	—	—
3	Hugh McDermott	1922–1938	291	185	106	.636	130	82	.613	—	—	2 – 1928^, 1929^	—
4	Bruce Drake^{†}	1939–1955	382	200	182	.524	106	80	.570	6	3	6 – 1939^, 1940^, 1942^, 1944^, 1947^, 1949^	—
5	Doyle Parrack	1956–1962	168	71	97	.423	34	58	.370	—	—	—	—
6	Bob Stevens	1963–1967	125	46	79	.368	26	44	.371	—	—	—	—
7	John MacLeod	1968–1973	159	90	69	.566	44	40	.524	—	—	—	—
8	Joe Ramsey	1974–1975	52	31	21	.596	15	13	.536	—	—	—	—
9	Dave Bliss	1976–1980	128	76	52	.594	38	32	.543	1	1	1 – 1979*^	—
10	Billy Tubbs	1981–1994	465	333	132	.716	126	70	.643	15	9	5 – 1984^, 1985*^, 1988*^, 1989^, 1990*	—
11	Kelvin Sampson	1995–2006	388	279	109	.719	128	60	.681	11	11	4 – 2001*, 2002*, 2003*, 2005^	Henry Iba Award (1995); AP Coach of the Year (1995); NABC Coach of the Year (2002)
12	Jeff Capel	2006–2011	165	83	69	.546	33	43	.434	4	2	—	—
13	Lon Kruger	2012–2021	323	195	128	.604	90	89	.503	6	4	—	—
14	Porter Moser	2021–Present	170	95	75	.559	32	56	.364	3	3	—	—

=== Women's ===
#	Name	Term	GC	OW	OL	O%	CW	CL	C%	PW	PL	CCs
1	Amy Dahl	1974	16	2	14	.125	—	—	—	—	—	—
2	Cathie Schweitzer	1975–1978	73	27	46	.370	—	—	—	—	—	—
3	Doyle Parrack	1978–1980	62	30	32	.484	—	—	—	—	—	—
4	Maura McHugh	1980–1987	212	142	70	.670	41	28	.594	3	3	—
5	Valerie Goodwin-Colbert	1987–1990	83	32	51	.386	13	29	.310	—	—	—
6	Gary Hudson	1990–1993	84	39	45	.464	17	24	.415	—	—	—
7	Burl Plunkett	1993–1996	88	52	36	.591	22	20	.524	4	1	—
8	Sherri Coale	1996–2021	805	512	293	.683	145	77	.653	20	11	5 – 2000^, 2001^, 2002*^, 2004*, 2006*^, 2007*^, 2009^
9	Jennie Baranczyk	2021–Present	—	—	—	—	—	—	—	—	—	—
