= List of Oklahoma Sooners women's basketball seasons =

The Oklahoma Sooners women's basketball team represents the University of Oklahoma in NCAA Division I women's college basketball as members of the Southeastern Conference. The program began in the 1974–75 season. The program has reached the Women's Final Four three times. The program plays their games in the Lloyd Noble Center in Norman, Oklahoma.

== Seasons ==
National champions †	Conference champions *	Conference tournament champions ‡	Postseason berth	Shared standing T	Not applicable

Season	Head coach	Season results					Postseason results	Final ranking		Refs.
Season	Head coach	Conference			Overall		Postseason results	AP	Coaches'	Refs.
Season	Head coach	Finish	Win(s)	Loss(es)	Win(s)	Loss(es)	Postseason results	AP	Coaches'	Refs.
Oklahoma Sooners
Independent (1974–1982)
1974–75	Amy Dahl				2	14				
1975–76	Cathie Schweitzer				3	14				
1976–77	Cathie Schweitzer				4	20				
1977–78	Cathie Schweitzer				20	12				
1978–79	Doyle Parrack				13	16				
1979–80	Doyle Parrack				17	16				
1980–81	Maura McHugh				21	11				
1981–82	Maura McHugh				17	14				
Big Eight Conference (1982–1996)
1982–83	Maura McHugh	4th	7	7	17	11				
1983–84	Maura McHugh	3rd	8	6	22	10	NWIT sixth place			
1984–85	Maura McHugh	2nd	10	4	23	7				
1985–86*	Maura McHugh	1st	10	4	23	7	NCAA Sweet Sixteen	19	18	
1986–87	Maura McHugh	T–5th	6	8	18	10				
1987–88	Valerie Goodwin-Colbert	5th	7	7	14	13				
1988–89	Valerie Goodwin-Colbert	8th	4	10	11	16				
1989–90	Valerie Goodwin-Colbert	T–7th	2	12	7	22				
1990–91	Gary Hudson	7th	4	9	10	18				
1991–92	Gary Hudson	4th	7	7	10	18				
1992–93	Gary Hudson	6th	6	8	12	15				
1993–94	Burl Plunkett	5th	7	7	18	12	NWIT champions			
1994–95	Burl Plunkett	2nd	11	3	22	9	NCAA second round			
1995–96	Burl Plunkett	7th	4	10	12	15				
Big 12 Conference (1996–2024)
1996–97	Sherri Coale	12th	1	15	5	22				
1997–98	Sherri Coale	T–9th	4	12	8	19				
1998–99	Sherri Coale	T–5th	8	8	15	14	WNIT Sixteen			
1999–2000 *	Sherri Coale	T–1st	13	3	25	8	NCAA Sweet Sixteen	18	13	
2000–01 *	Sherri Coale	1st	15	1	28	6	NCAA Sweet Sixteen	7	10	
2001–02 *	Sherri Coale	1st‡	14	2	32	4	NCAA Runner-up	2	2	
2002–03	Sherri Coale	T–5th	9	7	19	13	NCAA first round			
2003–04	Sherri Coale	6th‡	9	7	24	9	NCAA second round	11	18	
2004–05	Sherri Coale	T–6th	8	8	17	13	NCAA first round			
2005–06 *	Sherri Coale	1st‡	16	0	31	5	NCAA Sweet Sixteen	7	8	
2006–07 *	Sherri Coale	T–1st‡	13	3	28	5	NCAA Sweet Sixteen	9	9	
2007–08	Sherri Coale	T–3rd	11	5	22	9	NCAA second round	14	19	
2008–09 *	Sherri Coale	T–1st	15	1	32	5	NCAA Final Four	4	4	
2009–10 *	Sherri Coale	1st	11	5	27	11	NCAA Final Four	12	3	
2010–11	Sherri Coale	T–2nd	10	6	23	12	NCAA Sweet Sixteen	21	15	
2011–12	Sherri Coale	T–2nd	11	7	21	13	NCAA second round			
2012–13	Sherri Coale	T–3rd	11	7	21	13	NCAA Sweet Sixteen			
2013–14	Sherri Coale	T–5th	9	9	18	15	NCAA first round			
2014–15	Sherri Coale	2nd	13	5	21	12	NCAA second round			
2015–16	Sherri Coale	T–4th	11	7	22	11	NCAA second round			
2016–17	Sherri Coale	3rd	13	5	23	10	NCAA second round			
2017–18	Sherri Coale	T–3rd	11	7	16	15	NCAA first round			
2018–19	Sherri Coale	T–8th	4	14	8	22				
2019–20	Sherri Coale	9th	5	13	12	18				
2020–21	Sherri Coale	6th	9	8	12	12				
2021–22	Jennie Baranczyk	4th	12	6	25	9	NCAA second round	21	22	
2022–23 *	Jennie Baranczyk	T–1st	14	4	26	7	NCAA second round	16	17	
2023–24 *	Jennie Baranczyk	1st	15	3	23	10	NCAA second round	22	20	
Southeastern Conference (2024–present)
2024–25	Jennie Baranczyk	T–4th	11	5	27	8	NCAA Sweet Sixteen	11	11	
