= List of Oklahoma Sooners head softball coaches =

The Oklahoma Sooners softball program is a college softball team that represents the University of Oklahoma in the Big 12 Conference in the National Collegiate Athletic Association. The team has had five head coaches since it started playing organized softball in the 1975 season. The current coach is Patty Gasso, who took over the head coaching position in 1995.

== Key ==
General
#	Number of coaches (Note: A running total of the number of head coaches.)
GC	Games coached

Overall
OW	Wins
OL	Losses
OT	Ties
O%	Winning percentage

Conference (Note: Oklahoma competed in multiple conference organizations in its early years, with varying systems of conference play and championships. They played as part of the Oklahoma Association of Intercollegiate Athletics for Women, the Southwest Association of Intercollegiate Athletics for Women, and Big Eight Conference from 1976. Records for Big 8 play only exist beginning in 1985. Oklahoma joined the Big 12 Conference beginning in 1996.)
CW	Wins
CL	Losses
CT	Ties
C%	Winning percentage

Postseason (Note: Postseason play involving the NCAA Division I softball championship or AIAW Women's College World Series.)
PA	Total appearances (Note: Postseason appearances include seasons with NCAA Division I softball championship bids since the tournament began in 1982.)
PW	Total wins
PL	Total losses
WA	Women's College World Series appearances (Note: College World Series appearances include seasons with WCWS bids since the tournament began in 1969.)
WW	Women's College World Series wins
WL	Women's College World Series losses

Championships
CC	Conference regular season
CT	Conference tournament (Note: The Big 12 Conference softball tournament began in 1996, but was not held from 2011–2016.)
NC	National championships (Note: Women's College World Series sponsored by either the AIAW or NCAA.)

== Coaches ==
List of head softball coaches showing season(s) coached, overall records, conference records, postseason records, championships and selected awards (Note: Statistics correct as of the end of the 2026 NCAA Division I softball season.)
#	Name	Term	GC	OW	OL	OT	O%	CW	CL	CT	C%	PA	WA	CCs	CTs	NCs
1	Amy Dahl	1975–1976	34	18	16	0	.529	—	—	—	—	—	1	0	—	0
2	Marita Hynes	1977–1984	275	257	18	0	.935	—	—	—	—	—	3	0	0	0
3	Michelle Thomas	1985–1993	456	226	230	0	.496	31	75	0	.292	0	0	0	—	0
4	Jim Beitia	1994	73	58	15	0	.795	5	7	0	.417	1	0	0	—	0
5	Patty Gasso	1995–present	1,980	1,619	371	2	.813	464	107	0	.813	31	18	17	10	8
