= Gary Hudson =

Gary Hudson may refer to:

- Gary Hudson (engineer), American aerospace engineer
- Gary Hudson (actor) (born 1956), American actor
- Gary Hudson (basketball) (1949–2009), American basketball coach
