= Domonic Jones =

American former basketball player (born 1981)

Personal information
- Born: August 26, 1981 (age 45) Richmond, Virginia
- Listed height: 6 ft 1 in (1.85 m)
- Listed weight: 205 lb (93 kg)

Career information
- High school: Manchester (Midlothian, Virginia)
- College: VCU (2000–2004)
- NBA draft: 2004: undrafted
- Playing career: 2004–2012
- Position: Point guard / shooting guard

Career history
- 2004–2007: Karlsruhe
- 2007–2008: Phantoms Braunschweig
- 2008–2010: EnBW Ludwigsburg
- 2010: Artland Dragons
- 2011: Verviers-Pepinster
- 2011–2012: Karlsruhe

Career highlights
- Basketball Bundesliga All-Star (2007); CAA Player of the Year (2004); 2× First-team All-CAA (2002, 2004); CAA All-Rookie Team (2001)

Domonic Jones (born August 16, 1981) is an American former basketball player. He briefly played for RBC Verviers-Pepinster in Basketball League Belgium in 2011 and Karlsruhe in the ProA during the 2011–12 season before retiring. He is 6'1", 205 pounds and switched between the point guard and shooting guard positions. Jones played college basketball at Virginia Commonwealth University where he was named the Colonial Athletic Association Men's Basketball Player of the Year in 2003–04.

== College ==
Jones played for the VCU Rams from 2000–01 through 2003–04. He arrived at VCU after a standout prep career playing for Manchester High School in his home city of Richmond, Virginia. When deciding to attend college, staying close to home was a big reason for selection VCU. Jones said, "To have my parents and close friends see me play is a big part of why I chose to play here. I really don't feel any pressure [to do well]; I've played in front of these people my whole life. I just go out and play my game."

In his freshman season, Jones averaged 8.6 points and 1.2 assists per game and scored a total of 248 points. The Rams finished with a 16–14 overall record. The following season, he more than doubled his total points by scoring 516 behind a 16.1 points per game average. VCU also improved, going 21–11, but still did not reach any postseason tournaments. Jones had a moderate slump during his junior year in 2002–03. His scoring average dipped to 12.4 points per game and his assists average stayed the same as the year before (3.9). The Rams finished 18–10 in head coach Jeff Capel's first season with the team.

Jones led VCU's resurgence in his senior year. He led the team in scoring at 16.3 points per game while also contributing 4.4 rebounds and 2.5 assists per game. The Rams won the regular season Colonial Athletic Association championship and then defeated George Mason, 55–54, in the 2004 CAA men's basketball tournament championship. They earned an automatic bid into the NCAA Tournament where they received the #13 seed. In their first round against #4 Wake Forest, VCU lost by one point, 79–78. The Rams finished the year with a 23–8 overall record. Domonic Jones was then named the CAA Player of the Year at the conclusion of the season.

== Professional ==
A professional career in the National Basketball Association was not much of an option after going unselected in the 2004 NBA draft. Jones signed with BG Karlsruhe, a club based in Karlsruhe, Germany that plays in the 2nd Basketball Bundesliga-Pro A. He spent the first three years of his international career with the squad and garnered moderate personal success. For one season following BG Karlsruhe he played for another German club, Phantoms Braunschweig, before signing with EnBW Ludwigsburg for two years. A brief stint of just 11 games playing for the German club Artland Dragons prepped his move to RBC Verviers-Pepinster, a club in Belgium for whom he briefly played in 2011. He returned to play for BG Karlsruhe during the 2011–12 season, after which he retired.
