= 2004 CAA men's basketball tournament =

- Classification: Division I
- Season: 2003–04
- Teams: 10
- Site: Richmond Coliseum; Richmond, Virginia
- Champions: VCU (2nd title)
- Winning coach: Jeff Capel III (1st title)
- MVP: Domonic Jones (VCU)
- Television: ESPN

2003–04 CAA men's basketball standings
	Conf.				Overall
Team	W		L	PCT	W		L	PCT
VCU †	14	–	4	.778	23	–	8	.742
Drexel	13	–	5	.722	18	–	11	.621
George Mason	12	–	6	.667	23	–	10	.697
Old Dominion	11	–	7	.611	17	–	12	.586
Delaware	10	–	8	.556	16	–	12	.571
Hofstra	10	–	8	.556	14	–	15	.483
UNC Wilmington	9	–	9	.500	15	–	15	.500
Towson	4	–	14	.222	8	–	21	.276
William & Mary	4	–	14	.222	7	–	21	.250
James Madison	3	–	15	.167	7	–	21	.250
† 2004 CAA tournament winner Rankings from AP poll

The 2004 CAA men's basketball tournament was held March 5–8, 2004, at the Richmond Coliseum in Richmond, Virginia. The winner of the tournament was VCU, who received an automatic bid to the 2004 NCAA Men's Division I Basketball Tournament.

== Bracket ==
First round Friday, March 5
8	William & Mary	65
9	Towson	70
7	UNC Wilmington	44
10	James Madison	41

Quarterfinals; Saturday, March 6
1	VCU	67
9	Towson	60
4	Old Dominion	82
5	Hofstra	68
2	Drexel	53
7	UNC Wilmington	66
3	George Mason	65
6	Delaware	58^{OT}

Semifinals; Sunday, March 7
1	VCU	84
4	Old Dominion	67
7	UNC Wilmington	66
3	George Mason	80

Final; Monday, March 8
1	VCU	55
3	George Mason	54

== Honors ==
CAA All-Tournament Team	Player	School	Position
CAA All-Tournament Team	Domonic Jones	VCU	Guard
CAA All-Tournament Team	Troy Godwin	VCU	Forward
CAA All-Tournament Team	Jai Lewis	George Mason	Forward
CAA All-Tournament Team	Nick George	VCU	Forward
CAA All-Tournament Team	Tony Skinn	George Mason	Guard
CAA All-Tournament Team	Alex Loughton	Old Dominion	Forward
