= 2003–04 William & Mary Tribe men's basketball team =

American college basketball season

2003–04 William & Mary Tribe men's basketball
- Conference: Colonial Athletic Association
- Record: 7–21 (4–14 CAA)
- Head coach: Tony Shaver (1st season)
- Home arena: Kaplan Arena

2003–04 CAA men's basketball standings
	Conf.				Overall
Team	W		L	PCT	W		L	PCT
VCU †	14	–	4	.778	23	–	8	.742
Drexel	13	–	5	.722	18	–	11	.621
George Mason	12	–	6	.667	23	–	10	.697
Old Dominion	11	–	7	.611	17	–	12	.586
Delaware	10	–	8	.556	16	–	12	.571
Hofstra	10	–	8	.556	14	–	15	.483
UNC Wilmington	9	–	9	.500	15	–	15	.500
Towson	4	–	14	.222	8	–	21	.276
William & Mary	4	–	14	.222	7	–	21	.250
James Madison	3	–	15	.167	7	–	21	.250
† 2004 CAA tournament winner Rankings from AP poll

The 2003–04 William & Mary Tribe men's basketball team represented The College of William & Mary during the 2004–05 college basketball season. This was head coach Tony Shaver's first season at William & Mary after previously coaching at Hampden Sydney College. The Tribe competed in the Colonial Athletic Association and played their home games at Kaplan Arena. They finished the season 7–21, 4–14 in CAA play and lost in the quarterfinals of the 2004 CAA men's basketball tournament to Towson in the preliminary round. They did not participate in any post-season tournaments.
