= 2005 Women's National Invitation Tournament =

College basketball postseason tournament

- Teams: 32
- Finals site: Hammons Student Center, Springfield, Missouri
- Champions: Missouri State (1st title)
- Runner-up: West Virginia (1st title game)
- Semifinalists: Iowa; Kentucky
- Winning coach: Katie Abrahamson-Henderson (1st title)
- MVP: Jenny Lingor (Missouri State)
- Attendance: 8,871 (championship game)
- Top scorer: Jenny Lingor (Missouri State) (116 points)

The 2005 Women's National Invitation Tournament was a single-elimination tournament of 32 NCAA Division I teams that were not selected to participate in the 2005 Women's NCAA tournament. It was the eighth edition of the postseason Women's National Invitation Tournament.

The final four of the tournament paired Missouri State against Iowa and West Virginia against Kentucky. Missouri State upended Iowa 89–80. Meanwhile, West Virginia and Kentucky played a double overtime thriller, which ended up with West Virginia winning 80–75.

The final pitted Missouri State and West Virginia against each other in Springfield, Missouri, as the Lady Bears hosted at the Hammons Student Center. The game was another close one for both teams, with Missouri State ultimately pulling out the victory for their 1st WNIT Championship, 78–70.

== Bracket ==
=== Region 1 ===
*Host • Source

March 16–17
Tulsa | 62
Texas A&M | 73
Fresno State | 52
Texas A&M Corpus Christi* | 56
SMU | 56
Missouri State* | 83
BYU | 57
Gonzaga | 71

March 19–21
Texas A&M | 65
Texas A&M-CC | 59
Missouri State | 85
Gonzaga | 66

March 22–24
Texas A&M | 60
Missouri State* | 62

=== Region 2 ===
*Host • Source

March 16–17
UNLV | 48
Arkansas | 61
Mississippi State | 61
Arkansas State* | 78
Nebraska | 66
Marquette | 57
Creighton | 52
Iowa | 67

March 19–21
Arkansas | 84
Arkansas State | 98
Nebraska | 67
Iowa | 71

March 22–24
Arkansas State | 52
Iowa | 66

=== Region 3 ===
*Host • Source

March 16–17
Illinois | 60
Indiana State | 72
Xavier | 87
Western Kentucky | 85
Eastern Michigan | 68
Kentucky | 79
Villanova | 40
Chattanooga | 50

March 19–21
Indiana State | 70
Xavier | 79
Kentucky | 91
Chattanooga | 54

March 22–24
Xavier | 62
Kentucky | 67

=== Region 4 ===
*Host • Source

March 16–17
Charlotte | 75
Wake Forest | 100
Florida | 56
South Florida | 61
St. John's | 56
Delaware | 42
Maine | 59
West Virginia | 74

March 19–21
Wake Forest | 78
South Florida | 63
St. John's | 63
West Virginia | 68

March 22–24
Wake Forest | 52
West Virginia | 65

=== Semifinals and championship game ===
WNIT Semifinals; March 26–28
Missouri State | 89
Iowa | 80
Kentucky | 75
West Virginia | 80 2OT

WNIT Championship Game; March 31, 2005
Missouri State | 78
West Virginia | 70

== All-tournament team ==
- Jenny Lingor, Missouri State (MVP)
- Kari Koch, Missouri State
- Yolanda Paige, West Virginia
- Meg Bulger, West Virginia
- Crystal Smith, Iowa
- Sara Potts, Kentucky

== See also ==
- 2005 National Invitation Tournament
