= 2003–04 VCU Rams men's basketball team =

American college basketball season

2003–04 VCU Rams men's basketball

CAA Regular season and tournament champions

NCAA tournament, First Round
- Conference: Colonial Athletic Association
- Record: 23–8 (14–4 CAA)
- Head coach: Jeff Capel III (2nd season)
- Assistant coaches: Gerald White; Jeff LaMere; Mark Cline
- Home arena: Stuart C. Siegel Center

2003–04 CAA men's basketball standings
	Conf.				Overall
Team	W		L	PCT	W		L	PCT
VCU †	14	–	4	.778	23	–	8	.742
Drexel	13	–	5	.722	18	–	11	.621
George Mason	12	–	6	.667	23	–	10	.697
Old Dominion	11	–	7	.611	17	–	12	.586
Delaware	10	–	8	.556	16	–	12	.571
Hofstra	10	–	8	.556	14	–	15	.483
UNC Wilmington	9	–	9	.500	15	–	15	.500
Towson	4	–	14	.222	8	–	21	.276
William & Mary	4	–	14	.222	7	–	21	.250
James Madison	3	–	15	.167	7	–	21	.250
† 2004 CAA tournament winner Rankings from AP poll

The 2003–04 VCU Rams men's basketball team represented Virginia Commonwealth University during the 2003–04 NCAA Division I men's basketball season. It was the 36th season of the university fielding a men's basketball program. Led by second-year head coach Jeff Capel III, they continued to play their home games at the Stuart C. Siegel Center as a member of the Colonial Athletic Association. They finished the season 23–8, 14–4 in CAA play to finish in first place. The Rams defeated Delaware and UNC Wilmington in the CAA Tournament, before losing to Old Dominion in the final. They received an at-large bid to the NCAA tournament where they lost in the opening round to No. 4 seed Wake Forest.

== Roster ==
2003–04 VCU Rams men's basketball team
Players
Coaches

Pos.	#	Name	Height	Weight	Year	Hometown
F	1	Dixon Renardo	6 ft 9 in (2.06 m)	210 lb (95 kg)	Fr	Houston, TX
F	2	Michael Doles	6 ft 6 in (1.98 m)	210 lb (95 kg)	Jr	Richmond, VA
F	5	Julian Capel	6 ft 5 in (1.96 m)	185 lb (84 kg)	So	Fayetteville, NC
G	20	B. A. Walker	6 ft 2 in (1.88 m)	160 lb (73 kg)	Fr	Onancock, VA
F	21	Nick George	6 ft 6 in (1.98 m)	205 lb (93 kg)	Fr	Manchester, ENG
G	23	Jesse Pellot-Rosa	6 ft 4 in (1.93 m)	195 lb (88 kg)	Fr	Richmond, VA
G	25	Alex Harper	6 ft 4 in (1.93 m)	190 lb (86 kg)	So	Columbia, SC
F	30	Calvin Roland	6 ft 10 in (2.08 m)	245 lb (111 kg)	So	Hephzibah, GA
F	31	Eric Davis	6 ft 9 in (2.06 m)	225 lb (102 kg)	So	Philadelphia, PA
G	32	Drew Johnson	6 ft 4 in (1.93 m)	200 lb (91 kg)	Fr	Raleigh, NC
F	34	Derrick Reid	6 ft 8 in (2.03 m)	215 lb (98 kg)	RS Jr	Richmond, VA

Head coach

- Jeff Capel III (Duke)

Assistant coach(es)

- Gerald White (Auburn)
- Jeff LaMere (Duke)
- Mark Cline (Wake Forest)

Legend

- (C) Team captain
- (S) Suspended
- (I) Ineligible
- (W) Walk-on
- Injured
- Current redshirt

Roster

== Schedule and results ==
Date time, TV	Rank^{#}	Opponent^{#}	Result	Record	Site (attendance) city, state
Regular season
Nov 21, 2003*		Iona	W 65–61	1–0	Stuart C. Siegel Center; Richmond, Virginia
Nov 25, 2003*		Western Kentucky	W 72–67	2–0	Stuart C. Siegel Center; Richmond, Virginia
Nov 29, 2003*		at Hampton	W 67–51	3–0	Convocation Center; Hampton, Virginia
Dec 3, 2003*		at Richmond	L 52–70	3–1	Robins Center; Richmond, Virginia
Dec 6, 2003*		William & Mary	W 71–60	4–1 (1–0)	Stuart C. Siegel Center; Richmond, Virginia
Dec 15, 2003*		North Carolina A&T	W 105–51	5–1	Stuart C. Siegel Center; Richmond, Virginia
Dec 18, 2003*		UAB	L 58–68	5–2	Stuart C. Siegel Center; Richmond, Virginia
Dec 22, 2003*		at La Salle	W 55–54	6–2	Tom Gola Arena; Philadelphia, Pennsylvania
Dec 29, 2003*		at No. 4 Georgia Tech	L 65–86	6–3	Alexander Memorial Coliseum; Atlanta, Georgia
Jan 2, 2004*		Middle Tennessee	W 66–61	7–3	Stuart C. Siegel Center; Richmond, Virginia
Jan 5, 2004		at Hofstra	L 61–66	7–4 (1–1)	Hofstra Arena; Hempstead, New York
Feb 28, 2004		at William & Mary	W 74–59	20–7 (14–4)	William & Mary Hall; Williamsburg, Virginia
CAA tournament
Mar 6, 2004*		Towson; Quarterfinals	W 67–60	21–7	Richmond Coliseum; Richmond, Virginia
Mar 7, 2004*		Old Dominion; Semifinals	W 84–67	22–7	Richmond Coliseum; Richmond, Virginia
Mar 8, 2004*		George Mason; Championship game	W 55–54	23–7	Richmond Coliseum; Richmond, Virginia
NCAA Tournament
Mar 18, 2004*; CBS	(13 E)	vs. (4 E) No. 17 Wake Forest; First round	L 78–79	23–8	RBC Center; Raleigh, North Carolina
*Non-conference game. ^{#}Rankings from AP Poll. (#) Tournament seedings in parentheses. E=East.
