= Oklahoma Sooners women's volleyball =

Women's volleyball team of Oklahoma Sooners

- Founded: 1974 (52 years ago)
- University: University of Oklahoma
- Athletic director: Roger Denny
- Head coach: Aaron Mansfield (3rd season)
- Conference: SEC
- Location: Norman
- Home arena: McCasland Field House (capacity: 3,325)
- Nickname: Sooners
- Colors: Crimson

AIAW/NCAA regional semifinal
- 1988, 2006, 2010

AIAW/NCAA second round
- 1988, 1997, 2006, 2007, 2010, 2012, 2013, 2024

AIAW/NCAA tournament appearance
- 1987, 1988, 1997, 2006, 2007, 2009, 2010, 2011, 2012, 2013, 2014, 2019, 2024

The Oklahoma Sooners women's volleyball team represents the University of Oklahoma in NCAA Division I intercollegiate women's volleyball competition. Oklahoma is a member of the Southeastern Conference (SEC). The Sooners have been led by Aaron Mansfield since 2023.

== History ==
The program became an official varsity sport in 1974 and has been to the NCAA tournament 13 times. As of 2025, 3 players have earned All-SEC honors, 54 players have earned All-Big 12 honors, 35 players have earned All-Big Eight honors and 18 have been named All-Americans.

Year	Head Coach	Overall Record	Conference Record	Conference Standing	Postseason
(Association for Intercollegiate Athletics for Women (AIAW)) (1974–1986)
1974	Amy Dahl	4–15	-	-	-
1975	Amy Dahl	18–16	-	-	-
(Big Eight) (1976–1995)
1976	Amy Dahl	24–16	5–1	2nd	-
1977	Amy Dahl	18–24	2–4	4th	-
1978	Miles Pabst	14–28	2–4	5th	-
1979	Miles Pabst	50–24	-	2nd	-
1980	Miles Pabst	36–23	-	2nd	-
1981	Miles Pabst	10–40	-	4th	-
1982	Miles Pabst	16–17	-	3rd	-
1983	Miles Pabst	25–12	6–4	3rd	-
1984	Miles Pabst	22–10	5–5	4th	-
1985	Miles Pabst	27–13	8–2	2nd	-
1986	Miles Pabst	17–16	5–4	2nd	-
1987	Miles Pabst	26–8	10–2	1st	NCAA 1st Round
1988	Miles Pabst	23–9	8–4	2nd	NCAA 3rd Round
1989	Miles Pabst	18–17	8–4	3rd	-
1990	Miles Pabst	12–21	4–8	5th	-
1991	Miles Pabst	15–16	6–6	5th	-
1992	Miles Pabst	13–17	6–6	4th	-
1993	Miles Pabst	21–15	8–4	3rd	-
1994	Miles Pabst	17–15	5–7	4th	-
1995	Miles Pabst	22–13	7–6	4th	-
(Big 12) (1996–2023)
1996	Miles Pabst	17–15	8–12	7th	-
1997	Miles Pabst	20–13	13–7	5th	NCAA 2nd Round
1998	Miles Pabst	10–22	4–16	10th	-
1999	Miles Pabst	8–22	3–17	11th	-
2000	Kalani Mahi	7–21	2–18	10th	-
2001	Kalani Mahi	3–30	2–18	10th	-
2002	Kalani Mahi	6–22	4–16	9th	-
2003	Kalani Mahi	11–21	3–17	11th	-
2004	Santiago Restrepo	12–17	4–16	9th	-
2005	Santiago Restrepo	7–22	2–18	11th	-
2006	Santiago Restrepo	28–6	17–3	2nd	NCAA 3rd Round
2007	Santiago Restrepo	22–10	13–7	4th	NCAA 2nd Round
2008	Santiago Restrepo	12–16	8–12	7th	-
2009	Santiago Restrepo	18–12	11–9	4th	NCAA 1st Round
2010	Santiago Restrepo	23–11	13–7	3rd	NCAA 3rd Round
2011	Santiago Restrepo	21–12	8–8	5th	NCAA 1st Round
2012	Santiago Restrepo	22–11	9–6	4th	NCAA 2nd Round
2013	Santiago Restrepo	24–8	11–5	3rd	NCAA 2nd Round
2014	Santiago Restrepo	20–11	10–6	T–2nd	NCAA 1st Round
2015	Santiago Restrepo	12–16	6–10	6th	-
2016	Santiago Restrepo	14–15	5–11	7th	-
2017	Santiago Restrepo	7–22	4–12	8th	-
2018	Lindsey Gray-Walton	17–11	9–7	T–3rd	-
2019	Lindsey Gray-Walton	19–9	11–5	3rd	NCAA 1st Round
2020	Lindsey Gray-Walton	4–14	3–11	9th	-
2021	Lindsey Gray-Walton	10–17	4–12	8th	-
2022	Lindsey Gray-Walton	15–13	5–11	8th	-
2023	Aaron Mansfield	11–17	4–14	11th	-
(SEC) (2024–present)
2024	Aaron Mansfield	15–11	8–8	6th	NCAA 2nd Round
2025	Aaron Mansfield	16–11	7–8	9th	-
Total		879–843–7	306–398		

== See also ==
- List of NCAA Division I women's volleyball programs
