= 2003–04 George Mason Patriots men's basketball team =

American college basketball season

2003–04 George Mason Patriots men's basketball
- Conference: Colonial Athletic Association
- Record: 23–10 (12–6 CAA)
- Head coach: Jim Larranaga
- Assistant coaches: Bill Courtney; Scott Cherry; Eric Konkol
- Home arena: Patriot Center

2003–04 CAA men's basketball standings
	Conf.				Overall
Team	W		L	PCT	W		L	PCT
VCU †	14	–	4	.778	23	–	8	.742
Drexel	13	–	5	.722	18	–	11	.621
George Mason	12	–	6	.667	23	–	10	.697
Old Dominion	11	–	7	.611	17	–	12	.586
Delaware	10	–	8	.556	16	–	12	.571
Hofstra	10	–	8	.556	14	–	15	.483
UNC Wilmington	9	–	9	.500	15	–	15	.500
Towson	4	–	14	.222	8	–	21	.276
William & Mary	4	–	14	.222	7	–	21	.250
James Madison	3	–	15	.167	7	–	21	.250
† 2004 CAA tournament winner Rankings from AP poll

The 2003–04 George Mason Patriots men's basketball team began their 38th season of collegiate play on November 21, 2003, versus Morehead State University at the Patriot Center in Fairfax, VA.

== Season notes ==
- On March 31, 2004, head coach Jim Larranaga received a two-year contract extension to push his deal through 2009.
- Freshman guard Lamar Butler missed three games with a left foot injury.
- On October 29, 2004, the 2003–04 George Mason Patriots were predicted to finish 1st in the Colonial Athletic Association.

== Awards ==
First Team All-CAA

- Jai Lewis

Second Team All-CAA

- Mark Davis

CAA Player of the Week

- Jai Lewis - Jan. 5
- Jai Lewis - Jan. 26
- Jai Lewis - Feb. 16

== Roster ==
Name	Number	Pos.	Height	Weight	Year	Hometown	High School
Tim Burns	12	G	6-3	185	Freshman	Greenfield, MA	Worcester Academy
Lamar Butler	22	G	6-2	170	Sophomore	Fort Washington, MD	Oxen Hill
Deon Cooper		F			Senior		
Mark Davis		G			Senior		
Raoul Heinen		G			Senior		
Makan Konate	3	F	6-7	215	Freshman	Mali	Worcester Academy
Jai Lewis	55	F	6-7	275	Sophomore	Aberdeen, MD	Aberdeen
Kevin Mickens					Junior		
Gabe Norwood	5	F	6-5	175	Freshman	State College, PA	State College
Terry Reynolds		G			Junior		
Tony Skinn	1	G	6-1	170	Sophomore	Takoma Park, MD	Takoma Academy
Richard Tynes		G			Senior		
Jesus Urbina	13	F	6-7	225	Freshman	Venezuela	Amelia Academy
Trent Wurtz		F			Sophomore		

== Player stats ==
Player	Games	MPG	PPG	RPG	FG %	3P%	FT %	Assists	Steals
Jai Lewis	33	27.6	14.5	7.5	.597	.000	.652	38	36
Mark Davis	31	24.8	12.9	3.6	.444	.326	.610	41	53
Lamar Butler	30	25.5	10.5	2.5	.381	.377	.825	54	23
Terry Reynolds	31	28.0	8.4	2.6	.316	.299	.721	158	45
Tony Skinn	32	19.1	8.2	2.1	.391	.341	.727	39	28
Raoul Heinen	33	27.8	6.8	3.7	.405	.290	.809	61	29
Kevin Mickens	33	16.5	4.7	2.8	.508	.000	.554	12	14
Trent Wurtz	31	17.3	3.5	3.5	.432	.281	.680	16	23
Jesus Urbina	29	9.4	2.3	2.2	.538	.000	.688	8	10
Richard Tynes	21	9.1	2.1	2.0	.487	.000	.545	5	9
Tim Burns	9	2.4	1.8	0.3	.500	.375	.750	0	1
Gabe Norwood	29	8.4	1.0	0.8	.306	.308	.500	22	10
Deon Cooper	11	3.6	0.5	0.7	.600	.000	.000	1	0
Makan Konate	6	1.8	0.0	0.3	.000	.000	.000	0	0

== Game log ==
Date time, TV	Rank^{#}	Opponent^{#}	Result	Record	Site city, state
November 21*		Morehead State	W 95–82	1–0	Patriot Center; Fairfax, VA
November 25*		at No. 24 Maryland	L 79–64	1–1	Cole Field House; College Park, MD
November 29*		at Iona	W 92–83	2–1	New Rochelle, NY
December 2*		East Carolina	W 76–65	3–1	Patriot Center; Fairfax, VA
December 4*		at Hartford	W 79–58	4–1	Chase Arena at Reich Family Pavilion; Hartford, CT
December 7*		at No. 10 North Carolina	L 115–81	4–2	Dean Smith Center; Chapel Hill, NC
December 18*		McNeese State	W 96–63	5–2	Patriot Center; Fairfax, VA
December 20*		at Duquesne	W 80–70	6–2	A. J. Palumbo Center; Pittsburgh, PA
December 23*		St. Bonaventure	W 69–55	7–2	Patriot Center; Fairfax, VA
January 3		Towson	W 71–62	8–2 (1–0)	Patriot Center; Fairfax, VA
January 7		Old Dominion	L 74–71	8–3 (1–1)	Patriot Center; Fairfax, VA
January 10		at William & Mary	W 84–71	9–3 (2–1)	William & Mary Hall; Williamsburg, VA
January 14		Hofstra	W 84–76	10–3 (3–1)	Patriot Center; Fairfax, VA
January 17		at VCU	L 80–56	10–4 (3–2)	Alltel Pavilion; Richmond, VA
January 21		at UNC Wilmington	W 64–62 ^{OT}	11–4 (4–2)	Trask Coliseum; Wilmington, NC
January 24		James Madison	W 74–70	12–4 (5–2)	Patriot Center; Fairfax, VA
January 26		at Drexel	L 83–65	12–5 (5–3)	Daskalakis Athletic Center; Philadelphia, PA
January 28		at Delaware	L 74–65	12–6 (5–4)	Bob Carpenter Center; Newark, DE
January 31		William & Mary	W 78–62	13–6 (6–4)	Patriot Center; Fairfax, VA
February 4		at Towson	W 74–57	14–6 (7–4)	Towson Center; Towson, MD
February 7		at James Madison	L 72–64	14–7 (7–5)	JMU Convocation Center; Harrisonburg, VA
February 11		VCU	W 69–57	15–7 (8–5)	Patriot Center; Fairfax, VA
February 14		Drexel	W 75–72 ^{OT}	16–7 (9–5)	Patriot Center; Fairfax, VA
February 18		at Hofstra	L 67–57	16–8 (9–6)	Hofstra Arena; Hempstead, NY
February 21		Delaware	W 75–61	17–8 (10–6)	Patriot Center; Fairfax, VA
February 25		UNC Wilmington	W 59–46	18–8 (11–6)	Daskalakis Athletic Center; Philadelphia, PA
February 28		at Old Dominion	W 70–66	19–8 (12–6)	Constant Convocation Center; Norfolk, VA
March 6		vs. Delaware; CAA Tournament Quarterfinals	W 65–58 ^{OT}	20–8	Richmond Coliseum; Richmond, VA
March 7		vs. UNC Wilmington; CAA Tournament Semifinals	W 80–66	21–8	Richmond Coliseum; Richmond, VA
March 8		vs. VCU; CAA Tournament Finals	L 55–54	21–9	Richmond Coliseum; Richmond, VA
March 17		Tennessee; NIT Opening Round	W 58–55	22–9	Patriot Center; Fairfax, VA
March 19		Austin Peay; NIT First Round	W 66–60	23–9	Patriot Center; Fairfax, VA
March 23		at Oregon; NIT Second Round	L 68–54	23–10	McArthur Court; Eugene, OR
*Non-conference game. ^{#}Rankings from Coaches' Poll. (#) Tournament seedings in parentheses. All times are in Eastern Time.

== Recruits ==
The following is a list of commitments George Mason has received for the 2004–2005 season:

- Folarin Campbell
- Jordan Carter
- Will Thomas
- John Vaughan
