= 2003–04 Drexel Dragons men's basketball team =

American college basketball season

2003–04 Drexel Dragons men's basketball

NIT First Round, L 70–85
- Conference: Colonial Athletic Association
- Record: 18–11 (13–5 CAA)
- Head coach: Bruiser Flint (3rd season)
- Assistant coaches: Geoff Arnold (3rd season); Mike Connors (3rd season); Chuck Martin (3rd season)
- Home arena: Daskalakis Athletic Center

2003–04 CAA men's basketball standings
	Conf.				Overall
Team	W		L	PCT	W		L	PCT
VCU †	14	–	4	.778	23	–	8	.742
Drexel	13	–	5	.722	18	–	11	.621
George Mason	12	–	6	.667	23	–	10	.697
Old Dominion	11	–	7	.611	17	–	12	.586
Delaware	10	–	8	.556	16	–	12	.571
Hofstra	10	–	8	.556	14	–	15	.483
UNC Wilmington	9	–	9	.500	15	–	15	.500
Towson	4	–	14	.222	8	–	21	.276
William & Mary	4	–	14	.222	7	–	21	.250
James Madison	3	–	15	.167	7	–	21	.250
† 2004 CAA tournament winner Rankings from AP poll

The 2003–04 Drexel Dragons men's basketball team represented Drexel University during the 2003–04 NCAA Division I men's basketball season. The Dragons, led by 3rd year head coach Bruiser Flint, played their home games at the Daskalakis Athletic Center and were members of the Colonial Athletic Association.

== Roster ==
2003–04 Drexel Dragons men's basketball team
Players
Coaches

Pos.	#	Name	Height	Weight	Year	Previous school	Hometown
G/F	1	Kenell Sanchez	6 ft 5 in (1.96 m)	220 lb (100 kg)	So	Bishop Eustace	Camden, NJ
F	4	Sean Brooks	6 ft 6 in (1.98 m)	250 lb (113 kg)	Jr	Central HS (MD)	Bladensburg, MD
G	5	Bashir Mason	6 ft 0 in (1.83 m)	180 lb (82 kg)	Fr	St. Benedict's	Jersey City, NJ
F	11	Jermaine Miller	6 ft 8 in (2.03 m)	235 lb (107 kg)	So	Storm King School	New York, NY
G	12	Maurice Maddon	6 ft 0 in (1.83 m)	180 lb (82 kg)	Fr	Upper Dublin HS	North Hills, PA
F	20	Chaz Crawford	6 ft 9 in (2.06 m)	200 lb (91 kg)	Fr	St. Raymond's	Philadelphia, PA
G/F	21	Danny Hinds	6 ft 6 in (1.98 m)	220 lb (100 kg)	Sr	Allentown Central Catholic HS	Allentown, PA
F	22	Tim Tillman	6 ft 8 in (2.03 m)	220 lb (100 kg)	So	Virginia Episcopal	Philadelphia, PA
F	24	Tim Whitworth	6 ft 6 in (1.98 m)	200 lb (91 kg)	Sr	Chestnut Hill Academy	Philadelphia, PA
G	32	Phil Goss	6 ft 1 in (1.85 m)	180 lb (82 kg)	Jr	Oxon Hill HS	Temple Hills, MD
G	34	Jeremiah King	6 ft 2 in (1.88 m)	180 lb (82 kg)	Jr	Philadelphia Christian	Passaic, NJ
F	44	Matt Stevenson	6 ft 7 in (2.01 m)	200 lb (91 kg)	Fr	Loch Raven HS	Towson, MD

Head coach

- James "Bruiser" Flint (Saint Joseph's)

Assistant coach(es)

- Geoff Arnold (Saint Joseph's)
- Mike Connors (Ithaca)
- Chuck Martin (South Carolina)

Legend

- (C) Team captain
- (S) Suspended
- (I) Ineligible
- (W) Walk-on
- Injured
- Current redshirt

Roster

== Schedule ==
Date time, TV	Rank^{#}	Opponent^{#}	Result	Record	High points	High rebounds	High assists	Site (attendance) city, state
Regular season
November 24, 2003*; 8:00 pm		at Penn; Battle of 33rd Street	L 73–79	0–1	17 – Sanchez	7 – Tied	4 – Tied	Palestra (4,856); Philadelphia, PA
November 29, 2003*; 7:00 pm		at Colgate	W 89–84	1–1	20 – Brooks	–	–	Cotterell Court (382); Hamilton, NY
December 2, 2003*; 7:00 pm		Lafayette	L 68–69	1–2	23 – Brooks	16 – Brooks	–	Daskalakis Athletic Center (2,132); Philadelphia, PA
December 6, 2003*; 7:00 pm		vs. Temple; Big 5 Classic	L 48–57	1–3	–	–	–	Palestra (8,722); Philadelphia, PA
December 8, 2003*; 7:00 pm		Quinnipiac	W 89–72	2–3	25 – Goss	15 – Brooks	–	Daskalakis Athletic Center (1,076); Philadelphia, PA
December 14, 2003*; 12:00 pm		vs. No. 12 Saint Joseph's; City 6	L 70–92	2–4	22 – Brooks	–	–	Palestra (5,223); Philadelphia, PA
December 20, 2003*; 5:00 pm		Rider	W 64–43	3–4	22 – King	–	–	Daskalakis Athletic Center (1,074); Philadelphia, PA
December 27, 2003*; 5:00 pm		vs. Hartford; FIU Holiday Classic Semifinals	W 72–52	4–4	15 – Tied	–	5 – Mason	FIU Arena (589); Miami, FL
December 28, 2003*; 7:00 pm		at Florida International; FIU Holiday Classic Championship	W 71–39	5–4	–	–	–	FIU Arena (766); Miami, FL
CAA Regular Season
January 3, 2004; 1:00 pm		at Old Dominion	L 58–65	5–5 (0–1)	12 – Goss	–	–	Ted Constant Convocation Center (4,728); Norfolk, VA
January 7, 2004; 7:00 pm		James Madison	W 77–61	6–5 (1–1)	20 – Brooks	–	–	Daskalakis Athletic Center (2,289); Philadelphia, PA
January 10, 2004; 2:00 pm		at UNC Wilmington	L 64–71	6–6 (1–2)	–	–	–	Trask Coliseum (6,100); Wilmington, NC
January 15, 2004; 7:00 pm		Delaware	W 82–75	7–6 (2–2)	22 – Brooks	–	–	Daskalakis Athletic Center (2,017); Philadelphia, PA
January 17, 2004; 7:00 pm		at William & Mary	W 80–76	8–6 (3–2)	–	–	–	Kaplan Arena (2,093); Williamsburg, VA
January 21, 2004; 7:00 pm		at Towson	W 88–82	9–6 (4–2)	20 – Whitworth	6 – Brooks	–	Towson Center (748); Towson, MD
January 24, 2004; 5:00 pm		Virginia Commonwealth	L 69–70	9–7 (4–3)	17 – Whitworth	–	–	Daskalakis Athletic Center (2,117); Philadelphia, PA
January 26, 2004; 7:00 pm		George Mason	W 83–65	10–7 (5–3)	22 – Goss	10 – Goss	–	Daskalakis Athletic Center (1,789); Philadelphia, PA
January 28, 2004; 7:00 pm		at Hofstra	W 82–81	11–7 (6–3)	26 – Sanchez	–	–	Mack Sports Complex (1,159); Hempstead, NY
January 31, 2004; 1:00 pm		UNC Wilmington	W 67–66 ^{OT}	12–7 (7–3)	–	–	–	Daskalakis Athletic Center (1,873); Philadelphia, PA
February 4, 2004; 7:30 pm		at Virginia Commonwealth	W 66–57	13–7 (8–3)	–	–	–	Siegel Center (4,836); Richmond, VA
February 7, 2004; 1:00 pm		William & Mary	W 83–72	14–7 (9–3)	–	–	–	Daskalakis Athletic Center (1,935); Philadelphia, PA
February 11, 2004; 7:00 pm		Hofstra	W 92–69	15–7 (10–3)	21 – Goss	–	–	Daskalakis Athletic Center (1,831); Philadelphia, PA
February 14, 2004; 7:00 pm		at George Mason	L 72–75 ^{OT}	15–8 (10–4)	18 – Whitworth	–	–	Patriot Center (3,511); Fairfax, VA
February 18, 2004; 7:00 pm		Old Dominion	W 82–66	16–8 (11–4)	22 – Brooks	–	–	Daskalakis Athletic Center (1,947); Philadelphia, PA
February 21, 2004; 1:00 pm		Towson	W 75–71	17–8 (12–4)	23 – Whitworth	–	–	Daskalakis Athletic Center (2,012); Philadelphia, PA
February 25, 2004; 7:00 pm		at James Madison	W 62–59	18–8 (13–4)	17 – Whitworth	–	–	JMU Convocation Center (3,035); Harrisonburg, VA
February 28, 2004; 7:30 pm		at Delaware	L 64–76	18–9 (13–5)	22 – Whitworth	–	8 – King	Bob Carpenter Center (4,837); Newark, DE
CAA tournament
March 6, 2004; 6:00 pm	(2)	vs. (7) UNC Wilmington; Quarterfinals	L 53–66	18–10	–	–	–	Richmond Coliseum (4,163); Richmond, VA
National Invitation Tournament
March 17, 2004; 8:00 pm		at Villanova; First Round	L 70–85	18–11	24 – Brooks	–	–	The Pavilion (3,229); Villanova, PA
*Non-conference game. ^{#}Rankings from AP. (#) Tournament seedings in parentheses. All times are in Eastern Time.

== Awards ==
Bruiser Flint

- CAA Coach Of The Year

Sean Brooks

- CAA All-Conference Second Team

Phil Goss

- CAA All-Conference First Team
- CAA Player of the Week

Bashir Mason

- CAA Defensive Player of the Year
- CAA All-Defensive Team
- CAA All-Rookie Team
- CAA Rookie of the Week (2)

Tim Whitworth

- CAA All-Conference Second Team
- CAA Player of the Week
- CAA All-Academic Team
