= Missouri State Lady Bears basketball =

Missouri State Lady Bears
2026–27 Missouri State Lady Bears basketball team
- University: Missouri State University
- Head coach: Beth Cunningham (4th season)
- Location: Springfield, Missouri
- Arena: Great Southern Bank Arena (capacity: 11,000)
- Conference: Conference USA
- Nickname: Lady Bears
- Colors: Maroon and white

NCAA Division I tournament Final Four
- 1992, 2001
Other NCAA Division I tournament results
Elite Eight	1992, 2001
Sweet Sixteen	1992, 1993, 2001, 2019, 2021
Appearances	1991, 1992, 1993, 1994, 1995, 1996, 1998, 1999, 2000, 2001, 2003, 2004, 2006, 2016, 2019, 2021, 2022, 2026

AIAW tournament appearances
- 1981

Conference tournament champions
- 1991, 1992, 1993, 1994, 1996, 2001, 2003, 2004, 2006, 2016, 2019, 2026

Conference regular-season champions
- 1990, 1991, 1992, 1993, 1994, 1995, 1996, 1999, 2001, 2004, 2005, 2012, 2020, 2021, 2025

Uniforms
Home	Away

The Missouri State Lady Bears basketball team represents Missouri State University in NCAA Division I women's basketball. The team has a storied history making 2 NCAA Final Fours, reaching 18 NCAA Tournaments, and claiming 13 conference regular season titles. The Lady Bears compete in Conference USA.

== History ==
Missouri State, known as Southwest Missouri State (SMSU) until 2005, began play in women's basketball in 1969. The Lady Bears played in the Missouri AIAW state tournaments from 1970 to 1982, post-season AIAW regional tournaments in 1974, 1975 and 1981, and the AIAW Division II national tourney in 1981. In 1982, the Lady Bears joined the ranks of Division I programs in the NCAA. From 1982 to 1992, the Lady Bears played in the Gateway Collegiate Athletic Conference before that conference was absorbed by the Missouri Valley Conference in 1992. They joined Conference USA in 2025.

Missouri State has made 18 appearances in the NCAA Tournament including six straight appearances from 1991 to 1996, four straight appearances from 1998 to 2001, as well as appearances in 2003, 2004, 2006, 2016, 2019, 2021, and 2022. The Lady Bears' tournament success is highlighted by two trips to the Final Four (1992, 2001), two Elite Eight appearances (1992, 2001) and five trips to the Sweet Sixteen (1992, 1993, 2001, 2019, 2021).

The Lady Bears have made 9 appearances in the WNIT (2002, 2005, 2010, 2011, 2012, 2015, 2017, 2018, 2023). They won the 2005 WNIT, 78–70, over West Virginia.

As of the end of the 2023–2024 season, they have an all-time record of 993–639 (.608).

=== 1992 Final Four ===
In 1992, Missouri State as an 8-seed became the lowest women's seed at the time to make the Final Four. The Lady Bears beat Kansas 75–59, Iowa 61–60 in overtime, UCLA 83–57 and Ole Miss 94–71. They were defeated 84–72 by Western Kentucky in the National Semifinals.

=== 2001 Final Four ===
In 2001 Missouri State earned a 5-seed in the West Region. The Lady Bears went to the Final Four in St. Louis after winning the West Region Missouri State defeated Toledo 89–71, Rutgers 60–53, Duke 81–71, and Washington 104–87. They were beaten in the National Semifinals by Purdue 81–64.

== Postseason ==
=== NCAA Tournament appearances ===
The Bears have made eighteen appearances in the NCAA Division I women's basketball tournament, with a combined record of 20–18.

Year	Seed	Round	Opponent	Result
1991	#8	First Round; Second Round	#9 Tennessee Tech #1 Tennessee	W 94–64; L 47–55
1992	#8	First Round; Second Round; Sweet Sixteen; Elite Eight; Final Four	#9 Kansas #1 Iowa #5 UCLA #2 Ole Miss #4 Western Kentucky	W 75–59; W 61–60; W 83–57; W 94–71; L 72–84
1993	#7	First Round; Second Round; Sweet Sixteen	#10 Oklahoma State #2 Maryland #6 Louisiana Tech	W 86–71; W 86–82; L 43–59
1994	#6	First Round; Second Round	#11 Northern Illinois #3 Virginia	W 75–56; L 63–67
1995	#9	First Round; Second Round	#8 Utah #1 Colorado	W 49–47; L 34–78
1996	#12	First Round	#5 Texas	L 55–73
1998	#8	First Round	#9 Notre Dame	L 64–78
1999	#7	First Round; Second Round	#10 UC Santa Barbara #2 Colorado State	W 72–70; L 70–86
2000	#10	First Round	#7 Auburn	L 74–78
2001	#5	First Round; Second Round; Sweet Sixteen; Elite Eight; Final Four	#12 Toledo #4 Rutgers #1 Duke #6 Washington #3 Purdue	W 89–71; W 60–53; W 81–71; W 104–87; L 64–81
2003	#15	First Round	#2 Texas Tech	L 59–67
2004	#12	First Round	#5 Notre Dame	L 65–69^{OT}
2006	#13	First Round	#4 Purdue	L 52–73
2016	#13	First Round	#4 Texas A&M	L 65–74
2019	#11	First Round; Second Round; Sweet Sixteen	#6 DePaul #3 Iowa State #2 Stanford	W 89–77; W 69–60; L 46–55
2021	#5	First Round; Second Round; Sweet Sixteen	#12 UC Davis #13 Wright State #1 Stanford	W 70–51; W 64–39; L 62–89
2022	#11	First Four; First Round	#11 Florida State #6 Ohio State	W 61–50; L 56–63
2026	#16	First Four; First Round	#16 Stephen F. Austin #1 Texas	W 85–75; L 45–87

=== WBIT results ===
The Bears have made two appearances in the Women's Basketball Invitation Tournament (WBIT), with a combined record of 1–2.

Year	Round	Opponent	Result
2024	First Round	Illinois	L 69–74
2025	First Round; Second Round	Oral Roberts; Minnesota	W 107–76; L 71–78

=== AIAW Division II tournament results ===
The Bears made one appearance in the AIAW National Division II basketball tournament, with a combined record of 0–1.

Year	Round	Opponent	Result
1981	First Round	College of Charleston	L 55–70

== Retired numbers ==
Missouri State has retired four numbers, which now hang in the rafters of the Lady Bear's home, Great Southern Bank Arena. Additionally, former head coach, Cheryl Burnett was honored with a retired jersey in recognition of her leadership of the Lady Bear's program.

=== (#10) Jackie Stiles ===
- AP Player of the Year (2001)
- 3x- All American
- Wade Trophy Winner (2001)
- Women's Basketball Hall of Fame (2016)
- Missouri Valley Conference Hall of Fame
- Missouri Sports Hall of Fame
- WNBA Rookie of the Year (2001)
- 3x- Missouri Valley Conference Player of the Year
- Player of the Year Award in MVC now bears her name
- 4x- All Conference First Team
- MVC All-Centennial Team
- MVC 25 Year Team

=== (#22) Kari Koch ===
- 1x- All-American
- 4x- All Conference First Team
- MVC Player of the Year (2004)
- MVC All-Centennial Team
- MVC 25 Year Team

=== (#35) Melody Howard ===
- 2x- All-American
- 3x- All Conference
- MVC Player of the Year (1994)
- MVC All-Centennial Team
- MVC 25 Year Team
- Missouri Valley Conference Hall of Fame
- Missouri Sports Hall of Fame

=== (#42) Jeanette Tendai ===
- 2x- All American
- 3x- All Conference
- MSU Hall of Fame
- Springfield Area Sport Hall of Fame
- MVC All-Centennial Team

=== (HC) Cheryl Burnett ===
- Missouri State's winningest women's basketball coach
  - 319–136 (.711) in 15 season
- 10 NCAA Tournaments
- 2 Final Fours
- 15 Conference Titles
- Led NCAA in attendance in 1992–1993
- Mentored 8 All-Americans, 6 Academic All-Americans, 5 League MVPs and 26 first-team all MVC selections

Lady Bears Retired Numbers
Number	Player	Years active	G-GS	FG-FGA	FG PCT	3FG-3FGA	3FG PCT	FT-FTA	FT PCT	REB	AVG	PTS	AVG	A	TO	BS	MIN	MPG
10	Jackie Stiles	1997–2001	129–128	1160–2188	.530	221–501	.441	852–997	.855	479	3.7	3393	26.3	295	381	23	4133	32.0
35	Melody Howard	1990–1994	127–123	716–1527	.469	258–588	.439	254–315	.806	403	3.2	1944	15.3	356	292	8	3710	29.2
42	Janette Tendai	1982–1986	110–97	726–1468	.495	---	---	317–414	.766	910	8.3	1769	16.1	93	256	27	---	---
HC	Cheryl Burnet	Head Coach: 1987–2002	---	---	---	---	---	---	---	---	---	---	---	---	---	---	---	---

== Year by year results ==
Record table
Season	Team	Overall	Conference	Standing	Postseason
Missouri State Lady Bears (Missouri AIAW state tournament) (1969–1982)
Reba Sims (1969–1979)
1969–70	Reba Sims	10–7			
1970–71	Reba Sims	14–6			
1971–72	Reba Sims	19–6			
1972–73	Reba Sims	19–12			
1973–74	Reba Sims	21–7			2nd Place AIAW Region VI Tournament
1974–75	Reba Sims	16–10			3rd Place AIAW Region VI Tournament
1975–76	Reba Sims	6–17			
1976–77	Reba Sims	8–17			
1977–78	Reba Sims	8–17			
1978–79	Reba Sims	8–17			
Marti Gasser (1979–1983)
1979–80	Marti Gasser	8–17			
1980–81	Marti Gasser	25–10			2nd Place AIAW Region VI, AIAW first round
1981–82	Marti Gasser	19–14			
Missouri State Lady Bears (Gateway Conference) (1982–1992)
1982–83	Marti Gasser	10–18			
Valerie Goodwin-Colbert (1983–1987)
1983–84	Valerie Goodwin-Colbert	12–16	8–10	6th	
1984–85	Valerie Goodwin-Colbert	12–16	9–9	4th	
1985–86	Valerie Goodwin-Colbert	6–21	5–13	7th	
1986–87	Valerie Goodwin-Colbert	17–10	12–6	2nd	
Cheryl Burnett (1987–2002)
1987–88	Cheryl Burnett	9–17	6–12	T-6th	
1988–89	Cheryl Burnett	7–20	5–13	8th	
1989–90	Cheryl Burnett	19–8	14–4	T-1st	
1990–91	Cheryl Burnett	26–5	16–2	1st	NCAA second round
1991–92	Cheryl Burnett	31–3	17–1	1st	NCAA Final Four
Missouri State Lady Bears (Missouri Valley Conference) (1992–Present)
1992–93	Cheryl Burnett	23–9	14–2	1st	NCAA Sweet Sixteen
1993–94	Cheryl Burnett	24–6	15–1	1st	NCAA second round
1994–95	Cheryl Burnett	21–12	14–4	1st	NCAA second round
1995–96	Cheryl Burnett	25–5	16–2	1st	NCAA first round
1996–97	Cheryl Burnett	17–10	13–5	T-2nd	
1997–98	Cheryl Burnett	24–6	14–4	2nd	NCAA first round
1998–99	Cheryl Burnett	25–7	15–3	1st	NCAA second round
1999–00	Cheryl Burnett	23–9	14–4	T–2nd	NCAA first round
2000–01	Cheryl Burnett	29–6	16–2	T-1st	NCAA Final Four
2001–02	Cheryl Burnett	16–13	12–6	3rd	WNIT First Round
Katie Abrahamson-Henderson (2002–2007)
2002–03	Katie Abrahamson-Henderson	18–13	11–7	4th	NCAA first round
2003–04	Katie Abrahamson-Henderson	28–4	16–2	1st	NCAA first round
2004–05	Katie Abrahamson-Henderson	25–8	15–3	1st	WNIT Champion
2005–06	Katie Abrahamson-Henderson	17–15	7–11	T-6th	NCAA first round
2006–07	Katie Abrahamson-Henderson	7–21	3–15	10th	
Nyla Milleson (2007–2013)
2007–08	Nyla Milleson	11–19	9–9	5th	
2008–09	Nyla Milleson	10–20	6–12	7th	
2009–10	Nyla Milleson	22–11	12–6	T-3rd	WNIT Third Round
2010–11	Nyla Milleson	24–11	12–6	T-2nd	WNIT Second Round
2011–12	Nyla Milleson	24–9	14–4	1st	WNIT Third Round
2012–13	Nyla Milleson	14–17	6–12	8th	
Kellie Harper (2013–2019)
2013–14	Kellie Harper	14–17	8–10	T-6th	
2014–15	Kellie Harper	18–15	13–5	3rd	WNIT First Round
2015–16	Kellie Harper	24–10	14–4	T-2nd	NCAA first round
2016–17	Kellie Harper	16–15	12–6	3rd	WNIT First Round
2017–18	Kellie Harper	21–12	15–3	2nd	WNIT Second Round
2018–19	Kellie Harper	25–10	16–2	2nd	NCAA Sweet Sixteen
Amaka Agugua-Hamilton (2019–2022)
2019–20	Amaka Agugua-Hamilton	26–4	16–2	1st	Cancelled due to COVID-19
2020–21	Amaka Agugua-Hamilton	23–3	16–0	1st	NCAA Sweet Sixteen
2021–22	Amaka Agugua-Hamilton	24–7	14–4	2nd	NCAA tournament
Beth Cunningham (2022–present)
2022–23	Beth Cunningham	20–12	14–6	T–4th	WNIT First round
2023–24	Beth Cunningham	23–10	15–5	3rd	WBIT First round
2024–25	Beth Cunningham	26–9	16–4	T–1st	WBIT Second round
Total:		1,017–646 (.612)			
National champion Postseason invitational champion Conference regular season champion Conference regular season and conference tournament champion Division regular season champion Division regular season and conference tournament champion Conference tournament champion
