= Burl Plunkett =

American basketball player and coach

Biographical details
- Born: May 26, 1933; Plunkettville, Oklahoma
- Died: June 6, 2008 (age 75); Valliant, Oklahoma

Playing career
- 1953–1955: Centenary

Coaching career (HC unless noted)
- 1993–1996: Oklahoma

Head coaching record
- Overall: 52–36 (.591)

Accomplishments and honors

Championships
- National Women's Invitational Tournament (NWIT) (1994)

Burl Plunkett (May 26, 1933 – June 6, 2008) is a former basketball coach. Prior to being a head coach, Plunkett played two seasons at Centenary College, averaging 17.9 and 14.4 points per game, respectively. He served as the head coach for numerous high schools, including his hometown school of Valliant from 1962 to 1965, Tuloso-Midway High School from 1966 to 1971, Byng High School from 1971 to 1979 and Idabel High School from 1980 to 1990, winning three state titles with Byng. Plunkett served as the seventh head coach of the University of Oklahoma women's basketball program from 1993 to 1996. He had served as assistant coach for three years prior to being hired to replace Gary Hudson. In his first year, he led them to an 18–12 record, good enough for an invitation to the National Women's Invitational Tournament that year as one of the eight teams. The Sooners won the tournament by beating Arkansas State 69–65. The following year, he led them to a 21–8 record and an invite to the 1995 NCAA Division I women's basketball tournament, where they made it to the Second Round before losing to Louisiana Tech 48–36. After a dismal 12–15 season the following year, he retired from the Sooners.

== Head coaching record ==
Record table
Season	Team	Overall	Conference	Standing	Postseason
Oklahoma Sooners (Big Eight Conference) (1993–1996)
1993–94	Oklahoma	18–12	7–7	5th	NWIT Champions
1994–95	Oklahoma	22–9	11–3	2nd	NCAA Second Round
1995–96	Oklahoma	12–15	4–10	7th	
Oklahoma:		52–36 (.591)	22–20 (.524)		
Total:		52–36 (.591)			
National champion Postseason invitational champion Conference regular season champion Conference regular season and conference tournament champion Division regular season champion Division regular season and conference tournament champion Conference tournament champion
