= Maura McHugh =

American basketball player and coach (born 1953)

Biographical details
- Born: June 20, 1953 (age 73); Worcester, Massachusetts, U.S.

Playing career
- 1971–1975: Old Dominion

Coaching career (HC unless noted)
- 1978–80: Penn State (assistant)
- 1980–87: Oklahoma
- 1987–93: Arizona State
- 1997–98: Long Beach Stingrays (ABL)
- 1999–2001: Sacramento Monarchs (WNBA) (Asst. Coach)
- 2001–03: Sacramento Monarchs
- 2004–07: Stony Brook

Head coaching record
- Overall: 267–200 (college); 35–35 (WNBA)
- Tournaments: 1–2 (NCAA); 3–2 (WNBA playoffs)

Accomplishments and honors

Championships
- 1 Big Eight regular season (1986)

Maura McHugh (born June 20, 1953) is a former basketball coach who has coached at the college level, in the WNBA and ABL. She was a four-year starter at Old Dominion University in the early 1970s. She was one of the first women's basketball players in the nation to receive a scholarship. She began as a graduate assistant coach at Penn State University before being promoted to assistant coach for two seasons. Her first head coaching position was at the University of Oklahoma where she coached for seven seasons. She followed up her time at Oklahoma with six years at Arizona State University. She also coached the now defunct Long Beach Stingrays of the ABL for one year in 1997–98 and followed that up with a stint as both assistant coach and head coach for the Sacramento Monarchs of the WNBA. Most recently, she served as head coach of the women's basketball program at Stony Brook University from 2003 to 2007.

== Head coaching record ==
=== College ===
Record table
Season	Team	Overall	Conference	Standing	Postseason
Oklahoma Sooners (Independent) (1980–1982)
1980–81	Oklahoma	21–11			
1981–82	Oklahoma	17–14			
Oklahoma Sooners (Big Eight Conference) (1982–1987)
1982–83	Oklahoma	17–11	7–7	4th	
1983–84	Oklahoma	22–10	8–6	3rd	NWIT Sixth Place
1984–85	Oklahoma	23–7	10–4	2nd	
1985–86	Oklahoma	24–7	10–4	1st	NCAA Sweet Sixteen
1986–87	Oklahoma	18–10	6–8	T–5th	
Oklahoma:		142–70 (.670)	41–29 (.586)		
Arizona State Sun Devils (Pac 10 Conference) (1987–1993)
1987–88	Arizona State	11–17	5–13	T–8th	
1988–89	Arizona State	9–19	3–15	10th	
1989–90	Arizona State	13–15	5–13	T–8th	
1990–91	Arizona State	14–14	5–13	9th	
1991–92	Arizona State	20–9	11–7	5th	NCAA First Round
1992–93	Arizona State	17–10	10–8	T–4th	
Arizona State:		79–89 (.470)	39–69 (.361)		
Stony Brook Seawolves (America East Conference) (2003–2007)
2003–04	Stony Brook	8–20	6–12	9th	
2005–06	Stony Brook	20–10	12–4	2nd	
2006–07	Stony Brook	18–11	14–2	2nd	
Stony Brook:		46–41 (.529)	32–18 (.640)		
Total:		267–200 (.572)			
National champion Postseason invitational champion Conference regular season champion Conference regular season and conference tournament champion Division regular season champion Division regular season and conference tournament champion Conference tournament champion

=== WNBA ===
Legend
Regular season	G	Games coached	W	Games won	L	Games lost	W–L %	Win–loss %
Playoffs	PG	Playoff games	PW	Playoff wins	PL	Playoff losses	PW–L %	Playoff win–loss %

Team	Year	G	W	L	W–L%	Finish	PG	PW	PL	PW–L%	Result
Sacramento	2001	20	14	6	.700	2nd in Western	5	3	2	.600	Lost Conference Finals
Sacramento	2002	32	14	18	.438	6th in Western	–	–	–		Missed playoffs
Sacramento	2003	18	7	11	.389		–	–	–		Fired mid-season
Career		70	35	35	.500		5	3	2	.600	

Preceded by Sonny Allen	Sacramento Monarchs Head Coach; 2001–2003	Succeeded by John Whisenant
