= Valerie Goodwin-Colbert =

American basketball coach

Playing career
- 1975–79: Wayland Baptist
- 1979–80: Dallas Diamonds

Coaching career (HC unless noted)
- 1981–82: Stephen F. Austin Ladyjacks (assistant)
- 1982–83: Oklahoma State (assistant)
- 1983–87: Southwest Missouri State
- 1987–90: Oklahoma
- 1990–2015: Southwestern College (CA)

Head coaching record
- Overall: 79–114 (.409) (senior college)

Valerie Goodwin-Colbert is a former basketball coach. She was the fifth head coach of the University of Oklahoma women's basketball program. While at Oklahoma, the program had a 32–51 record. During her tenure, the university dropped the women's basketball program but later reinstated it only to have Goodwin-Colbert resign the next day. Prior to coaching at Oklahoma, Goodwin-Colbert was the head women's basketball coach at Southwest Missouri State University. Goodwin–Colbert was raised in Forgan, Oklahoma and played basketball at Wayland Baptist University. After playing for the Flying Queens, played professional basketball for the Dallas Diamonds.

== Head coaching record ==
=== Senior college ===
Record table
| Season | Team | Overall | Conference | Standing | Postseason |
|---|---|---|---|---|---|
Southwest Missouri State Lady Bears (Gateway Collegiate Athletic Conference) (1983–1987)
| 1983–84 | Southwest Missouri State | 12–16 | 8–10 | 6th | |
| 1984–85 | Southwest Missouri State | 12–16 | 9–9 | 4th | |
| 1985–86 | Southwest Missouri State | 6–21 | 5–13 | 7th | |
| 1986–87 | Southwest Missouri State | 17–10 | 12–6 | 2nd | |
| Southwest Missouri State: | | 47–63 (.427) | 34–38 (.472) | | |
Oklahoma Sooners (Big Eight Conference) (1987–1990)
| 1987–88 | Oklahoma | 14–13 | 7–7 | 5th | |
| 1988–89 | Oklahoma | 11–16 | 4–10 | 8th | |
| 1989–90 | Oklahoma | 7–22 | 2–12 | T–7th | |
| Oklahoma: | | 32–51 (.386) | 13–29 (.310) | | |
| Total: | | 79–114 (.409) | | | |
National champion Postseason invitational champion Conference regular season champion Conference regular season and conference tournament champion Division regular season champion Division regular season and conference tournament champion Conference tournament champion
