= Cathie Schweitzer =

American basketball coach

Biographical details
- Education: University of Akron; Bowling Green State University; University of Iowa

Coaching career (HC unless noted)

Basketball
- 1975–1978: Oklahoma
- 1982–1984: Grinnell

Track and field
- 1975–1977: Oklahoma

Softball
- 1983: Grinnell

Soccer
- 1990–1995: Albion

Administrative career (AD unless noted)
- 2000–2015: Springfield

Head coaching record
- Overall: 36–75 (.324) (basketball); 57–50–5 (.531) (soccer); 1–13 (.071) (softball)

Cathie Schweitzer is a former coach and athletics administrator. She served as the second head coach of the women's basketball team at Oklahoma from 1975 to 1978, and the track team from 1975 to 1977 She also served as the head coach of Grinnell College's women's basketball team from 1982 to 1984, and the softball team in 1983. From 1990 to 1995, she was the women's soccer coach at Albion College. She later became the athletic director at Springfield College from 2000–2015, and a member of the faculty at University of Massachusetts Amherst.

== Head coaching record ==
=== Women's college basketball ===
Record table
Season	Team	Overall	Conference	Standing	Postseason
Oklahoma Sooners (Independent) (1975–1978)
1975–76	Oklahoma	3–14			
1976–77	Oklahoma	4–20			
1977–78	Oklahoma	20–12			
Oklahoma:		27–46 (.370)			
Grinnell Pioneers (Midwest Conference) (1982–1984)
1982–83	Grinnell	5–12	3–9		
1983–84	Grinnell	4–17	1–9	6th (South)	
Grinnell:		9–29 (.237)	4–18 (.182)		
Total:		36–75 (.324)			

=== College softball ===
Record table
Season	Team	Overall	Conference	Standing	Postseason
Grinnell Pioneers (Midwest Conference) (1983)
1983	Grinnell	1–13	–	6th	
Grinnell:		1–13 (.071)			
Total:		1–13 (.071)			

=== Women's college soccer ===
Record table
Season	Team	Overall	Conference	Standing	Postseason
Albion Britons (Michigan Intercollegiate Athletic Association) (1990–1995)
1990	Albion	4–12	2–4	5th	
1991	Albion	5–14	5–7	4th	
1992	Albion	11–8–1	6–5–1	3rd	
1993	Albion	10–5–3	6–3–3	3rd	
1994	Albion	14–5–1	8–3–1	3rd	
1995	Albion	13–6	8–4	2nd	
Albion:		57–50–5 (.531)	35–26–5 (.568)		
Total:		57–50–5 (.531)			
