= Jeff Capel III =

American basketball player and coach (born 1975)

Jeff Capel
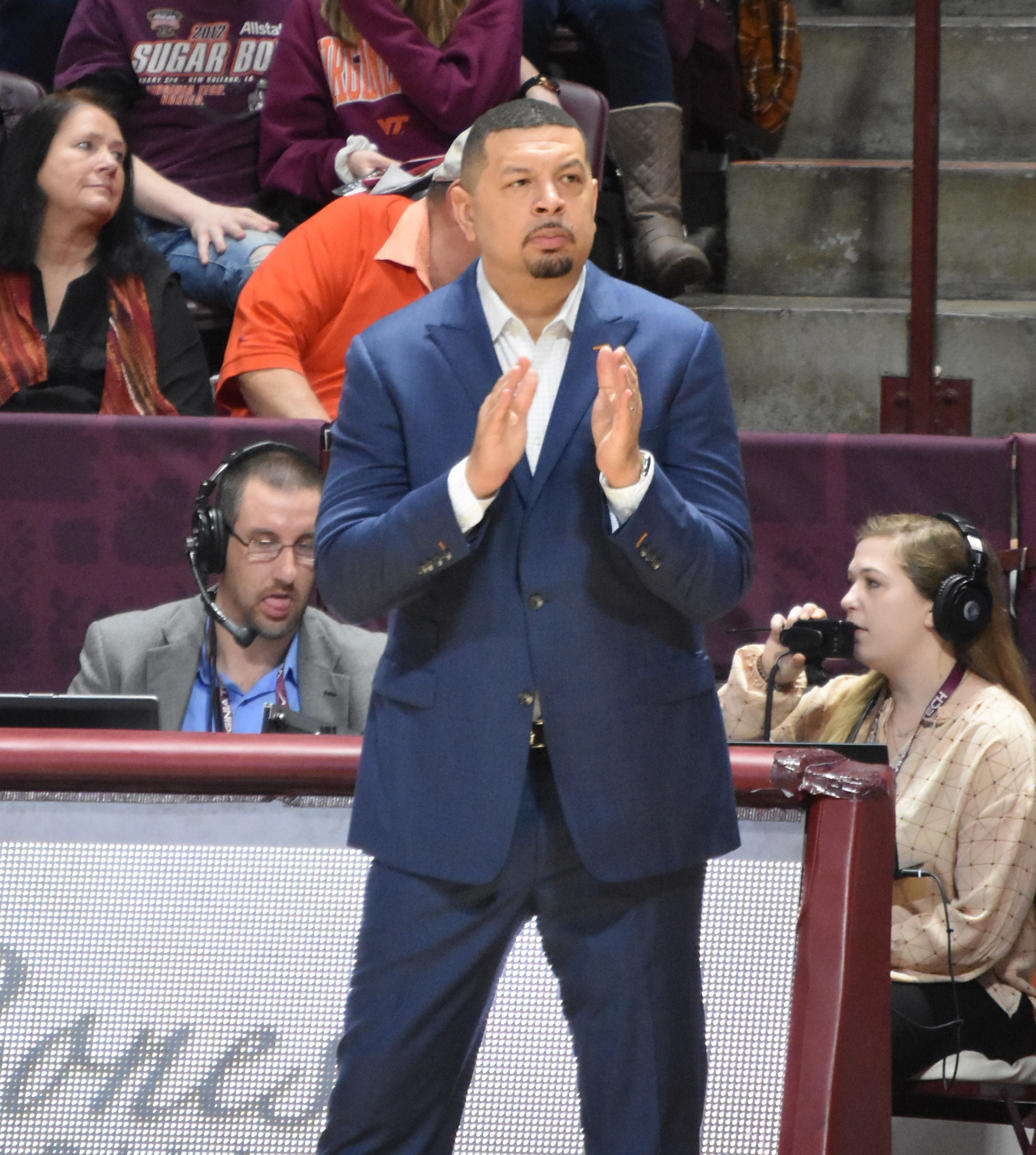
- Capel as head coach at Pitt (2020)

Current position
- Title: Head coach
- Team: Pittsburgh
- Conference: ACC
- Record: 127–127 (.500)

Biographical details
- Born: February 12, 1975 (age 51); Fayetteville, North Carolina, U.S.
- Education: Duke University

Playing career
- 1993–1997: Duke
- 1997–1998: Grand Rapids Hoops
- 1999: Élan Chalon
- 1999–2000: Grand Rapids Hoops
- Position: Guard

Coaching career (HC unless noted)
- 2000–2001: Old Dominion (assistant)
- 2001–2002: VCU (assistant)
- 2002–2006: VCU
- 2006–2011: Oklahoma
- 2011–2018: Duke (asst./assoc. HC)
- 2018–present: Pittsburgh

Head coaching record
- Overall: 288–232 (.554)
- Tournaments: 6–4 (NCAA Division I); 0–1 (NIT)

Accomplishments and honors

Championships
- CAA tournament (2004); CAA regular season (2004)

Awards
- CBA All-Rookie Team (1998); Third-team All-ACC (1996); North Carolina Mr. Basketball (1993); Fourth-team Parade All-American (1993); ACC Coach of the Year (2023)

Felton Jeffrey Capel III (born February 12, 1975) is an American college basketball coach and former player who is currently the head men's basketball coach at the University of Pittsburgh. He played for Duke University and was a head coach at Virginia Commonwealth University and University of Oklahoma.

== Youth ==
Capel is from a basketball family. His father was the late basketball coach Jeff Capel II, former assistant coach for the Charlotte Bobcats and former head coach at Old Dominion University, and his younger brother Jason played basketball at Duke's biggest rival, the University of North Carolina at Chapel Hill and was the head basketball coach at Appalachian State University. As a senior at South View High School in Hope Mills, North Carolina, Jeff led his team to the 1993 state championship defeating Charlotte powerhouse South Mecklenburg 53–52 with a last second lay-up. He also set school career records in points (2,066), rebounds (668), and assists (663).

== College career ==
While at Duke University (1993–1997), he earned a starting position as a freshman and was a starting guard on the basketball team for four years. On February 2, 1995, in the regular season game played at home against UNC, with Duke trailing 95–92 at the end of the first overtime, Capel hit a running 40-foot shot at the buzzer which sent the game into double overtime. Although Duke lost the game 102–100, Capel's shot was hailed as one of the most memorable plays in Duke basketball history, and it was nominated for an ESPY Award for College Basketball Play of the Year.

Capel's college career was marked with success. During his years as a Blue Devil, he racked up 1,601 points, 433 assists, and 220 three-point field goals. He finished his career among Duke's all-time Top 10 in minutes played, three-point field goal percentages, three-point field goals, and assists.

== Professional career ==
Following his graduation from Duke, Capel played professional basketball for the Grand Rapids Hoops of the Continental Basketball Association (CBA). In 1997-98, he saw action in 56 games for Grand Rapids, averaging 11.9 points per contest. He was selected to the CBA All-Rookie Team in 1998. Capel was also drafted in 1997 by the Raleigh Cougars of the USBL. In 1999, he played two games (5.5 ppg) with Élan Chalon in France and had another 33 outings for the Grand Rapids Hoops, scoring 8.1 points a contest in the CBA.

== Coaching career ==
=== Virginia Commonwealth University ===
Capel began his coaching career serving as an assistant coach under his father, Jeff Capel II, at Old Dominion University for the 2000–2001 season. In 2001, he joined the coaching staff of Virginia Commonwealth University as an assistant. He was promoted to head coach of the Rams for the 2002–2003 season—making him, at the time, the youngest head coach in Division I men's college basketball (27 years old). In his four years as head coach at VCU, Capel guided the Rams to a record number of wins (79) and the highest winning percentage (.658) of any Division I program in the Commonwealth of Virginia. Following the 2003–04 season, Capel was named both the Richmond Times-Dispatch and VaSID state Coach of the Year after leading the Rams to their first NCAA Tournament appearance since 1996. Coaching highlights include a near-upset of Wake Forest in the 2004 NCAA Tournament. Surprisingly, one of his toughest opponents was the Division II crosstown rival, Virginia Union University. Capel's Rams lost two years in a row to the Panthers on VCU's home court. However, he did lead the Rams to a 7–3 record against CAA rival, and former employer, Old Dominion.

In 2005, Capel was named an assistant coach in the USA Men's World University Games Team, joining then Manhattan head coach Bobby Gonzalez in assisting Villanova head coach Jay Wright. The United States won the gold medal in İzmir, Turkey, in August.

=== University of Oklahoma ===
On April 11, 2006, Capel was named the head coach of the Oklahoma men's basketball team, succeeding Kelvin Sampson. Though the Sooner Nation as a whole greeted Capel's hiring with optimism, one notable downside of the coaching change emerged—Sampson's departure caused three players who had signed with OU (once considered a top 5 recruiting class) to rethink their decisions to attend OU. Scottie Reynolds went on to Villanova, where he led his team to the NCAA tournament and Damion James was a key part to a Texas team which was defeated by Southern California in the second round of the NCAA tournament.

==== 2006–07 ====
In his first year as head coach, the Sooners finished 16–15. After going 9–4 in non-conference games, with losses to Memphis, Purdue, Villanova, and Alabama, the Sooners started a promising 6–3 in conference play, before losing their final 7 conference games. After winning only one game in the Big 12 Conference tournament, losing to eventual conference tournament champion Kansas, this caused the Sooners to miss any form of postseason play, which snapped the nation's longest streak of 23 consecutive years in the postseason, starting with Billy Tubbs' second year in 1982 and ending with Kelvin Sampson's final year in 2006.

==== 2007–08 ====
In his second year, after signing McDonald's All-American Forward Blake Griffin, the Sooners showed vast signs of improvement and finished 21–10 during the regular season (9–7 in Big 12 play) earning them a #4 seed in the Big 12 tournament, where they won one game before losing to Texas in the semi-finals. They received a #6 seed in the NCAA tournament, where they defeated St. Joseph's in the first round before losing to #3 seed Louisville in the second round.

==== 2008–09 ====
Player of the Year Candidate Blake Griffin announced he would be returning for his sophomore season, forgoing a possible lottery-pick status in the NBA draft. Coupled with the signing of another McDonald's All-American guard in Willie Warren, the 2008–09 season looked to be promising.

The team experienced one of the best starts in school history at 25–1, until Blake Griffin was sidelined with a concussion during the first half of the OU-Texas game on February 21. The Sooners went on to lose consecutive games for the first time all season, losing to Texas by 5 in Austin and Kansas by 9 in Norman. Without their star player, the Sooners fell short. Griffin returned to the lineup a week later and the Sooners returned to their winning ways defeating Texas Tech by 15 in Lubbock on February 28, before losing on the road to Missouri and finishing the regular season by sweeping in-state rival Oklahoma State.

After a first-round bye in the Big 12 tournament, the #2 seeded Sooners lost to the #7 seeded Cowboys by 1 point during the final seconds of the game.

Capel's Sooners were granted a #2 seed for the NCAA Tournament, and easily beat #15 seed Morgan State in the first round, #10 seed Michigan in the second round, and #3 seed Syracuse in the Sweet 16, whose vaunted 2–3 zone defense did nothing to slow down the Sooner's hot shooting from the perimeter.

However, after hitting nine 3-pointers during the previous game with Syracuse, the Sooner guards went 0–15 from beyond the arc during the first 35 minutes of their Elite 8 game against North Carolina, before finally finishing 2–19 in the game. This ultimately led to their demise by the Tar Heels on March 29, losing 60–72. Blake Griffin, announced he would forgo his final two years of eligibility to enter the NBA draft. He was drafted #1 overall by the Los Angeles Clippers and was the University of Oklahoma's first #1 draft pick in the NBA.

==== 2009–10 ====
Entering his fourth year, Capel's record at OU was 69–33 (0.676) overall, 28–20 (0.583) conference, with 2 NCAA Tournament Appearances, and one Elite Eight appearance. In the Big 12, Capel had yet to win a Conference tournament Title or Regular Season Title. Capel was averaging 21 wins per season (21–12) and 8 conference wins per season (8–8), almost on track with his predecessors Tubbs & Sampson.

With the return of McDonald's All-American and projected NBA Lottery Pick Willie Warren, and the addition of two more McDonald's All-American recruits in Tommie Mason-Griffin & Tiny Gallon, the Sooners were ranked #13 in the pre-season AP Poll and picked to finish 3rd in the Big 12 Conference. Unfortunately, injuries and off-court issues plagued the Sooners and the team failed to live up to expectations. Capel led Oklahoma to a 13–18 record in the 2009–10 season (all 13 wins were later vacated due to use of an ineligible player), the first losing season at Oklahoma since 1981. The Sooners ended the season with nine straight losses, the longest losing streak at Oklahoma in 41 years.

==== 2010–11 ====
In April 2010, Oklahoma announced the resignation of Capel's assistant Oronde Taliaferro without specifying the reason. There was speculation that it might be related to media reports that Tiny Gallon had received an impermissible extra benefit from Merrill Lynch employee and this was confirmed when subsequently released phone records tied him and Taliaferro and the NCAA confirmed it was investigating.

Five underclassmen left the program in the offseason and Capel was forced to play mostly unheralded leftovers and newcomers. Oklahoma went 14–18, attendance dropped significantly, and Capel was fired in March 2011 after two of the worst back-to-back losing seasons in Oklahoma basketball history. While enjoying a 30-win season and an Elite 8 appearance, Capel's tenure at Oklahoma is generally regarded by Sooner fans as a disappointment. In August 2011, Oklahoma admitted that Taliaferro had committed 2 NCAA violations in the Gallon case; Capel was not implicated in the violations.

=== Duke University ===
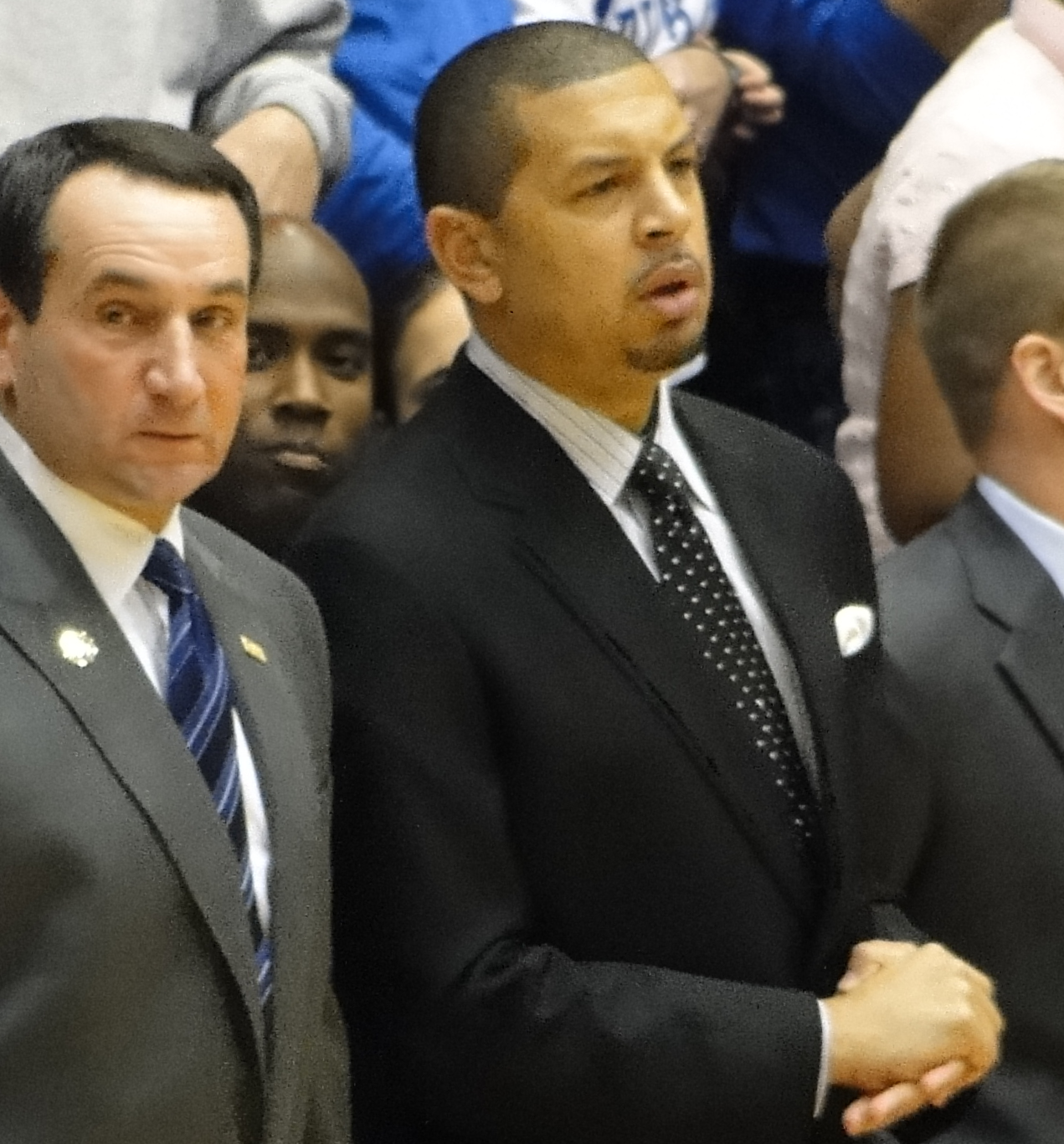
Capel at Duke with Mike Krzyzewski

On May 8, 2011, it was announced that Jeff Capel would be joining the staff of Mike Krzyzewski at his alma mater, Duke University, as an assistant coach. In April 2014, Capel was promoted by Krzyzewski to associate head coach.

On February 2, 2016, Jeff Capel stepped in as head coach for Duke University for one game versus Georgia Tech, due to an illness to Mike Kryzewski, and guided Duke to an 80–71 victory. In January 2017, Capel served as Duke's Acting Head Coach, filling in for Krzyzewski who underwent back surgery.

=== University of Pittsburgh ===
On March 27, 2018, the University of Pittsburgh announced the hiring of Capel to be the 16th head coach of their men's basketball program. Capel replaced former head coach Kevin Stallings, who led the Panthers to an 0–18 Atlantic Coast Conference record in 2017–18.

On March 6, 2023, Jeff Capel won the Atlantic Coast Conference Men's Basketball Coach of the Year award after leading Pitt to a 21–10 record with 14 conference wins.

== Broadcasting ==
During the 2019 NCAA tournament, Capel signed on with CBS and Turner as a guest TV studio analyst for the first round of the tournament.

== Personal life ==
Capel is married to Duke alumna Kanika Réale Blue, daughter of Daniel T. Blue, Jr. They were married in 2003 and have three children.

== Head coaching record ==
Record table
Season	Team	Overall	Conference	Standing	Postseason
VCU Rams (Colonial Athletic Association) (2002–2006)
2002–03	VCU	18–10	12–6	T–2nd	
2003–04	VCU	23–8	14–4	1st	NCAA Division I Round of 64
2004–05	VCU	19–13	13–5	T–2nd	NIT Opening Round
2005–06	VCU	19–10	11–7	5th	
VCU:		79–41 (.658)	50–22 (.694)		
Oklahoma Sooners (Big 12 Conference) (2006–2011)
2006–07	Oklahoma	16–15	6–10	T–7th	
2007–08	Oklahoma	23–12	9–7	T–4th	NCAA Division I Round of 32
2008–09	Oklahoma	30–6	13–3	2nd	NCAA Division I Elite Eight
2009–10	Oklahoma	13–18*	4–12*	T–11th	
2010–11	Oklahoma	14–18	5–11	8th	
Oklahoma:		83–69 (.546)*	33–43 (.434)*		
Pittsburgh Panthers (Atlantic Coast Conference) (2018–present)
2018–19	Pittsburgh	14–19	3–15	T–14th	
2019–20	Pittsburgh	16–17	6–14	T–13th	
2020–21	Pittsburgh	10–12	6–10	12th	
2021–22	Pittsburgh	11–21	6–14	T–11th	
2022–23	Pittsburgh	24–12	14–6	T–3rd	NCAA Division I Round of 32
2023–24	Pittsburgh	22–11	12–8	4th	
2024–25	Pittsburgh	17–15	8–12	T–9th	
2025–26	Pittsburgh	13–20	5–13	15th	
2026–27	Pittsburgh	3–0	0–0		
Pittsburgh:		130–127 (.506)	60–92 (.395)		
Total:		292–237 (.552)*			
National champion Postseason invitational champion Conference regular season champion Conference regular season and conference tournament champion Division regular season champion Division regular season and conference tournament champion Conference tournament champion

*Oklahoma vacated 13 regular season wins (and 4 conference wins) due to use of an ineligible player during the 2009–10 season.
