= Amy Dahl =

American basketball coach and athletic director

Coaching career (HC unless noted)

Basketball
- 1974–1975: Oklahoma

Volleyball
- 1974–1977: Oklahoma

Softball
- 1975–1976: Oklahoma

Head coaching record
- Overall: 2–14 (basketball); 64–71–6 (volleyball); 18–16 (softball)

Amy Dahl is a former women's basketball, softball and volleyball coach and former athletic director for sports at the University of Oklahoma. She served as the inaugural coach for the women's basketball team in 1974. She later worked as an administrative assistant at McGuire Bearing Company for 20 years, and has refereed volleyball for the past 27 years.

== Head coaching record ==
=== Women's basketball ===
Record table
Season	Team	Overall	Conference	Standing	Postseason
Oklahoma Sooners (Independent) (1974–1975)
1974–75	Oklahoma	2–14			
Oklahoma:		2–14 (.125)			
Total:		2–14 (.125)			

=== Volleyball ===
Record table
Season	Team	Overall	Conference	Standing	Postseason
Oklahoma Sooners () (1974–1977)
1974	Oklahoma	4–15			
1975	Oklahoma	18–16–3			
1976	Oklahoma	24–16–1			
1977	Oklahoma	18–24–2			
Oklahoma:		64–71–6 (.475)			
Total:		64–71–6 (.475)			

=== Softball ===
Record table
Season	Team	Overall	Conference	Standing	Postseason
Oklahoma Sooners (Independent) (1975–1976)
1975	Oklahoma	14–6			
1976	Oklahoma	4–10			
Oklahoma:		18–16 (.529)			
Total:		18–16 (.529)			
National champion Postseason invitational champion Conference regular season champion Conference regular season and conference tournament champion Division regular season champion Division regular season and conference tournament champion Conference tournament champion
