= Gary Hudson (basketball) =

American basketball coach (1949–2009)

Biographical details
- Born: August 29, 1949; McCook, Nebraska
- Died: February 1, 2009 (aged 59); Shawnee, Oklahoma
- Education: Augustana University

Coaching career (HC unless noted)
- 1982–83: Oklahoma Baptist (assistant)
- 1983–89: St. Gregory's
- 1989–90: Oregon State (assistant)
- 1990–93: Oklahoma

Head coaching record
- Overall: 39–45 (senior college)

Gary Hudson (August 29, 1949 − February 1, 2009) was an American basketball coach. He was the sixth head coach of the University of Oklahoma women's basketball program. While at Oklahoma, the program had a 39–45 record. Hudson was the first coach following the reinstatement of the women's basketball program at Oklahoma. Following his tenure at Oklahoma, he coached at Shawnee High School for five years before retiring for health reasons. Before coaching, Hudson played college football at the University of Wyoming for one year before transferring to Augustana College. He also played minor league baseball in the Minnesota Twins organizations before he started his coaching career which included stops at Oklahoma Baptist University, St. Gregory's University, and as an assistant coach at Oregon State University.

== Head coaching record ==
Record table
| Season | Team | Overall | Conference | Standing | Postseason |
|---|---|---|---|---|---|
Oklahoma Sooners (Big Eight Conference) (1990–1993)
| 1990–91 | Oklahoma | 10–18 | 4–9 | 7th | |
| 1991–92 | Oklahoma | 17–12 | 7–7 | 4th | |
| 1992–93 | Oklahoma | 12–15 | 6–8 | 6th | |
| Oklahoma: | | 39–45 (.464) | 17–24 (.415) | | |
| Total: | | 39–45 (.464) | | | |
National champion Postseason invitational champion Conference regular season champion Conference regular season and conference tournament champion Division regular season champion Division regular season and conference tournament champion Conference tournament champion
