= Michigan Wolverines men's basketball statistical leaders =

Aspect of sports

Michigan Wolverines logo

The Michigan Wolverines men's basketball statistical leaders are individual statistical leaders of the Michigan Wolverines men's basketball program in various categories, including points, rebounds, assists, steals, and blocks. Within those areas, the lists identify single-game, single-season, and career leaders. The Wolverines represent the University of Michigan in the NCAA's Big Ten Conference.

Michigan began competing in intercollegiate basketball in 1909. However, the school's record book does not generally list records from before the 1950s, as records from before this period are often incomplete and inconsistent. Since scoring was much lower in this era, and teams played much fewer games during a typical season, few or no players from this era would appear on these lists anyway.

The NCAA did not officially record assists as a stat until the 1983–84 season, and blocks and steals until the 1985–86 season, but Michigan's record books includes players in these stats before these seasons. These lists are updated through the end of the 2025–26 season.

== Scoring ==
Career
Rk	Player	Points	Seasons
1	Glen Rice	2,442	1985–86 1986–87 1987–88 1988–89
2	Mike McGee	2,439	1977–78 1978–79 1979–80 1980–81
3	Louis Bullock	2,224	1995–96 1996–97 1997–98 1998–99
4	Gary Grant	2,222	1984–85 1985–86 1986–87 1987–88
5	Cazzie Russell	2,164	1963–64 1964–65 1965–66
6	LaVell Blanchard	1,818	1999–00 2000–01 2001–02 2002–03
7	Rudy Tomjanovich	1,808	1967–68 1968–69 1969–70
8	Jalen Rose	1,788	1991–92 1992–93 1993–94
9	Bill Buntin	1,725	1962–63 1963–64 1964–65
10	Manny Harris	1,668	2007–08 2008–09 2009–10

Season
Rk	Player	Points	Season
1	Glen Rice	949	1988–89
2	Cazzie Russell	800	1965–66
3	Mike McGee	732	1980–81
4	Glen Rice	728	1987–88
5	Trey Burke	727	2012–13
6	Rudy Tomjanovich	722	1969–70
7	Gary Grant	717	1987–88
8	Gary Grant	716	1986–87
9	Cazzie Russell	694	1964–65
10	Chris Webber	690	1992–93

Single game
Rk	Player	Points	Season	Opponent
1	Rudy Tomjanovich	48	1968–69	Indiana
	Cazzie Russell	48	1965–66	Northwestern
3	Cazzie Russell	45	1965–66	San Francisco
4	Henry Wilmore	44	1970–71	Wisconsin
5	John Tidwell	43	1960–61	Minnesota
6	Rudy Tomjanovich	42	1969–70	Utah
	Henry Wilmore	42	1970–71	Ohio State
8	John Tidwell	41	1959–60	Michigan State

== Rebounds ==
Career
Rk	Player	Rebounds	Seasons
1	Rudy Tomjanovich	1,039	1967–68 1968–69 1969–70
2	Bill Buntin	1,037	1962–63 1963–64 1964–65
3	Loy Vaught	993	1986–87 1987–88 1988–89 1989–90
4	Phil Hubbard	979	1975–76 1976–77 1978–79
5	Roy Tarpley	953	1982–83 1983–84 1984–85 1985–86
6	Glen Rice	859	1985–86 1986–87 1987–88 1988–89
7	LaVell Blanchard	845	1999–00 2000–01 2001–02 2002–03
8	M.C. Burton	831	1956–57 1957–58 1958–59
9	Maceo Baston	830	1994–95 1995–96 1996–97 1997–98
10	Hunter Dickinson	787	2020–21 2021–22 2022–23

Season
Rk	Player	Rebounds	Season
1	Phil Hubbard	389	1976–77
2	M.C. Burton	379	1958–59
3	Bill Buntin	376	1962–63
	Rudy Tomjanovich	376	1969–70
5	Chris Webber	362	1992–93
6	Danny Wolf	360	2024–25
7	Phil Hubbard	352	1975–76
8	Loy Vaught	346	1989–90
9	Robert Traylor	344	1997–98
10	Rudy Tomjanovich	340	1968–69
	Chris Webber	340	1991–92

Single game
Rk	Player	Rebounds	Season	Opponent
1	Rudy Tomjanovich	30	1968–69	Loyola
2	Rudy Tomjanovich	27	1967–68	Kentucky
	M.C. Burton	27	1958–59	Iowa
4	Phil Hubbard	26	1976–77	Detroit

== Assists ==
Career
Rk	Player	Assists	Seasons
1	Gary Grant	731	1984–85 1985–86 1986–87 1987–88
2	Zavier Simpson	667	2016–17 2017–18 2018–19 2019–20
3	Rumeal Robinson	575	1987–88 1988–89 1989–90
4	Antoine Joubert	539	1983–84 1984–85 1985–86 1986–87
5	Derrick Walton Jr.	499	2013–14 2014–15 2015–16 2016–17
6	Daniel Horton	484	2002–03 2003–04 2004–05 2005–06
7	Travis Conlan	480	1994–95 1995–96 1996–97 1997–98
8	Eric Turner	421	1981–82 1982–83 1983–84
9	Trey Burke	416	2011–12 2012–13
10	Jalen Rose	401	1991–92 1992–93 1993–94

Season
Rk	Player	Assists	Season
1	Trey Burke	260	2012–13
2	Zavier Simpson	244	2018–19
3	Zavier Simpson	236	2019–20
4	Darius Morris	235	2010–11
5	Gary Grant	234	1987–88
	Elliot Cadeau	234	2025–26
7	Rumeal Robinson	233	1988–89
8	Derrick Walton Jr.	189	2016–17
9	Gary Grant	185	1985–86
10	Rumeal Robinson	184	1989–90

Single game
Rk	Player	Assists	Season	Opponent
1	Derrick Walton Jr.	16	2016–17	Nebraska
2	Mike Smith	15	2020–21	Maryland
3	Gary Grant	14	1987–88	Northern Michigan
	Gary Grant	14	1987–88	Western Michigan
	Zavier Simpson	14	2019–20	Houston Baptist
	Elliot Cadeau	14	2025–26	Oakland
7	Derrick Walton Jr.	13	2015–16	Youngstown State
	Manny Harris	13	2008–09	Oakland
	Rumeal Robinson	13	1988–89	North Carolina
	Gary Grant	13	1987–88	Eastern Michigan
	Antoine Joubert	13	1984–85	Northwestern
	Mark Bodnar	13	1980–81	Dayton
	Zavier Simpson	13	2019–20	Iowa State
	Zavier Simpson	13	2019–20	Gonzaga
	Elliot Cadeau	13	2025–26	Gonzaga

== Steals ==
Career
Rk	Player	Steals	Seasons
1	Gary Grant	300	1984–85 1985–86 1986–87 1987–88
2	Daniel Horton	187	2002–03 2003–04 2004–05 2005–06
	Jimmy King	187	1991–92 1992–93 1993–94 1994–95
4	Bernard Robinson	169	2000–01 2001–02 2002–03 2003–04
5	Travis Conlan	167	1994–95 1995–96 1996–97 1997–98
6	Zavier Simpson	156	2016–17 2017–18 2018–19 2019–20
7	Rumeal Robinson	150	1987–88 1988–89 1989–90
8	Derrick Walton Jr.	146	2013–14 2014–15 2015–16 2016–17
9	Manny Harris	144	2007–08 2008–09 2009–10
10	Louis Bullock	137	1995–96 1996–97 1997–98 1998–99

Season
Rk	Player	Steals	Season
1	Gary Grant	86	1986–87
2	Gary Grant	84	1985–86
3	Gary Grant	80	1987–88
4	Rumeal Robinson	70	1988–89
5	Bernard Robinson	68	2003–04
6	Daniel Horton	64	2005–06
7	Trey Burke	62	2012–13
8	Rickey Green	61	1976–77
9	Daniel Horton	60	2003–04
10	Jimmy King	58	1994–95

Single game
Rk	Player	Steals	Season	Opponent
1	Gary Grant	7	1984–85	Iowa
	Eric Turner	7	1981–82	Western Michigan
	Rickey Green	7	1976–77	Western Kentucky
4	Zavier Simpson	6*	2017–18	Texas A&M

*6 steals in a game has occurred 13 times in Michigan history. Zavier Simpson is the most recent occurrence of this.

== Blocks ==
Career
Rk	Player	Blocks	Seasons
1	Roy Tarpley	251	1982–83 1983–84 1984–85 1985–86
2	Courtney Sims	213	2003–04 2004–05 2005–06 2006–07
3	Chris Webber	175	1991–92 1992–93
4	Eric Riley	168	1989–90 1990–91 1991–92 1992–93
5	Jon Teske	165	2016-17 2017-18 2018-19 2019-20
6	Ekpe Udoh	159	2006–07 2007–08
7	Hunter Dickinson	149	2020–21 2021–22 2022–23
8	Brent Petway	146	2003–04 2004–05 2005–06 2006–07
9	Maceo Baston	138	1994–95 1995–96 1996–97 1997–98
10	Josh Asselin	136	1997–98 1998–99 1999–00 2000–01

Season
Rk	Player	Blocks	Season
1	Aday Mara	103	2025–26
2	Roy Tarpley	97	1985–86
3	Ekpe Udoh	92	2007–08
4	Chris Webber	91	1992–93
5	Chris Webber	84	1991–92
6	Eric Riley	78	1990–91
7	Jon Teske	75	2018-19
8	Roy Tarpley	69	1983–84
9	Courtney Sims	68	2003–04
10	Ekpe Udoh	67	2006–07

Single game
Rk	Player	Blocks	Season	Opponent
1	Roy Tarpley	10	1985–86	Florida Southern
2	Ekpe Udoh	9	2006–07	Army
	Eric Riley	9	1990–91	Utah
	Roy Tarpley	9	1985–86	Cleveland State
5	Courtney Sims	8	2005–06	Chicago State
	Eric Riley	8	1990–91	Illinois

== Three-Point Field Goals ==
=== Three-pointers made ===
Career
Rk	Player	Three-Pointers	Seasons
1	Louis Bullock	339	1995–96 1996–97 1997–98 1998–99
2	Dion Harris	268	2003–04 2004–05 2005–06 2006–07
3	Zak Irvin	241	2017–18 2014–15 2015–16 2016–17
4	Duncan Robinson	237	2015–16 2016–17 2017–18
5	Daniel Horton	233	2002–03 2003–04 2004–05 2005–06
	Derrick Walton	233	2013–14 2014–15 2015–16 2016–17
7	Zack Novak	213	2008–09 2009–10 2010–11 2011–12
8	Stu Douglass	205	2008–09 2009–10 2010–11 2011–12
9	Tim Hardaway Jr.	202	2010–11 2011–12 2012–13
10	LaVell Blanchard	189	1999–2000 2000–01 2001–02 2002–03

Season
Rk	Player	Three-Pointers	Season
1	Louis Bullock	101	1996–97
2	Glen Rice	99	1988–89
3	Derrick Walton	98	2016–17
4	Duncan Robinson	95	2015–16
5	Louis Bullock	93	1997–98
6	Nik Stauskas	92	2013-14
7	Robbie Reid	86	1998–99
8	Nik Stauskas	80	2012–13
9	Duncan Robinson	78	2017–18
	Jett Howard	78	2022–23

Single game
Rk	Player	Three-Pointers	Season	Opponent
1	Garde Thompson	9	1986–87	Navy
2	Garde Thompson	8	1985–86	Illinois-Chicago
	Glen Rice	8	1988–89	North Carolina
	Aubrey Dawkins	8	2014–15	Rutgers
5	Nimari Burnett	7*	2025–26	Penn State

*7 three-pointers in a game has occurred 13 times in Michigan history. Nimari Burnett is the most recent occurrence of this.

=== Three-point percentage ===
Career
Rk	Player	3PT%	Seasons
1	Garde Thompson	48.1%	1983–84 1984–85 1985–86 1986–87
2	Glen Rice	48.0%	1985–86 1986–87 1987–88 1988–89
3	Gary Grant	46.1%	1984–85 1985–86 1986–87 1987–88
4	Sean Higgins	44.8%	1987–88 1988–89 1989–90
5	Nik Stauskas	44.1%	2012–13 2013–14
6	Aubrey Dawkins	43.9%	2014–15 2015–16
7	Louis Bullock	42.3%	1995–96 1996–97 1997–98 1998–99
8	Duncan Robinson	41.9%	2015–16 2016–17 2017–18
9	Isaiah Livers	41.2%	2017–18 2018–19 2019–20 2020–21
10	Rumeal Robinson	41.1%	1987–88 1988–89 1989–90

Season (100 att. minimum)
Rk	Player	3PT%	Season
1	Glen Rice	51.6%	1988–89
2	Garde Thompson	48.1%	1986–87
3	Louis Bullock	47.2%	1996–97
4	Sean Higgins	46.4%	1988–89
5	Duncan Robinson	45.0%	2015–16
6	Louis Bullock	44.9%	1997-98
7	Nik Stauskas	44.2%	2013–14
8	Nik Stauskas	44.0%	2012–13
	Aubrey Dawkins	44.0%	2015–16
10	Isaiah Livers	43.1%	2020–21

Single game (5 att. minimum)
Rk	Player	3PT%	Season	Opponent
1	Gary Grant	100.0%	1987–88	Iowa
	Glen Rice	100.0%	1988–89	Wisconsin
	Matt Vogrich	100.0%	2008–09	Northern Michigan
	Tim Hardaway Jr.	100.0%	2011–12	Slippery Rock
	Nik Stauskas	100.0%	2012–13	Florida
	Duncan Robinson	100.0%	2015–16	Elon
	Muhammad-Ali Abdur-Rahkman	100.0%	2017–18	Nebraska
	Jordan Poole	100.0%	2018–19	Purdue
	Terrence Williams II	100.0%	2023–24	Ohio State
10	Garde Thompson	88.9%	1986–87	Illinois-Chicago
