= Bruce Weber (basketball) =

American basketball coach (born 1956)

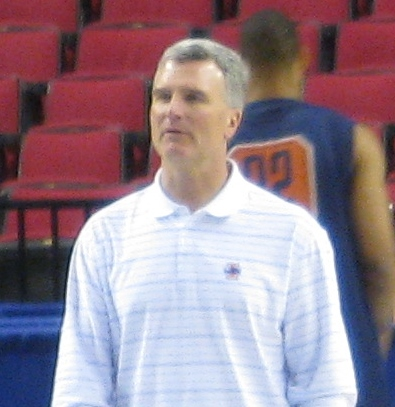
- Weber at the 2009 NCAA Division I men's basketball tournament

Biographical details
- Born: October 19, 1956 (age 70); Milwaukee, Wisconsin, U.S.
- Education: University of Wisconsin–Milwaukee

Coaching career (HC unless noted)
- 1979–1980: Western Kentucky (GA)
- 1980–1998: Purdue (assistant)
- 1998–2003: Southern Illinois
- 2003–2012: Illinois
- 2012–2022: Kansas State

Head coaching record
- Overall: 497–302 (.622)
- Tournaments: 15–13 (NCAA Division I); 3–2 (NIT)

Accomplishments and honors

Championships
- NCAA Division I regional – Final Four (2005); 2 MVC regular season (2002, 2003); 2 Big Ten regular season (2004, 2005); Big Ten tournament (2005); 2 Big 12 regular season (2013, 2019)

Awards
- Adolph Rupp Cup (2005); AP Coach of the Year (2005); Henry Iba Award (2005); NABC Coach of the Year (2005); Naismith College Coach of the Year (2005); MVC Coach of the Year (2003); Big Ten Coach of the Year (2005); Victor Awards National Coach of the Year (2005); AP Big 12 Coach of the Year (2013); Big 12 Coach of the Year (2013); USBWA District VI Coach of the Year (2013, 2019); NABC District 8 Coach of the Year (2013); Saluki Hall of Fame Class (2018); USA Basketball National co-Coach of the Year (2019)
Medal record
Head coach for men's basketball
Representing United States
FIBA U19 World Cup
Gold medal – first place	2019 Greece	Team

Bruce Brett Weber (born October 19, 1956) is an American former men's basketball coach who was most recently the head coach at Kansas State University. Prior to his tenure at Kansas State, Weber was the head coach at Southern Illinois University and the University of Illinois.

Weber won conference championships and conference coach of the year awards at each of the three schools where he served as head coach. He guided his teams to a combined total of 13 NCAA tournaments in 24 seasons, including an appearance with Illinois in the championship game of the 2005 NCAA tournament. Weber was the consensus national coach of the year in 2005.

== Coaching ==
=== Early career ===
Weber began his coaching career with a brief stint as a graduate assistant coach at Western Kentucky University during the 1979–80 season under head coach Gene Keady. In 1980, Weber moved to Purdue University along with Keady. He remained an assistant coach at Purdue for 18 seasons before becoming the head coach at Southern Illinois University in 1998.

=== Southern Illinois ===
In his five seasons at Southern Illinois, Weber led the Salukis to consecutive Missouri Valley Conference championships and NCAA tournament appearances in 2002 and 2003, including a Sweet Sixteen finish in 2002.

=== University of Illinois ===
On April 30, 2003, Weber was hired by Illinois to replace Bill Self, who had departed from Illinois to take the head coaching job at Kansas.

==== 2003–04 season ====
The Illini played a tough early season game against North Carolina on December 2 in Greensboro, and were tied at 69 with just six minutes to go. Illinois eventually lost the game 88–81, but it proved to be a good test for the young team with no seniors in the starting lineup. Weber faced his toughest test after starting the conference schedule with an even 3–3 mark. He changed many doubters' minds by winning the remaining ten games on the conference schedule, winning the Big Ten title outright for the first time since 1952. The Illini finished second losing to Wisconsin in the Big Ten tournament championship game. They received a bid as a #5 seed in the 2004 NCAA tournament, defeating Murray State and Cincinnati in the first two rounds to reach the Sweet Sixteen. A 72–62 loss to top-seeded Duke ended their tournament run, but capped a solid first season for coach Weber.

==== 2004–05 season ====
The 2005 season opened with high expectations and the return of all the team's starters. On December 1, the Illini defeated the number-one ranked team, Wake Forest, 91–73, at Assembly Hall. Weber sported a glowing orange blazer for the game, and Assembly Hall was painted orange by the 16,618 fans wearing school colors. The pressure grew for Weber as the victory vaulted the Illini to the top spot in the polls the following week, a spot they would carry for the rest of the season. Regular season perfection and their 29–0 record ended on the last game of the regular season, however, as Illinois lost a 12-point, second half lead to Ohio State and lost on a last second shot to the Thad Matta-coached Buckeyes, 65–64. The Illini won the Big Ten regular season and Tournament titles.

In the 2005 NCAA tournament the team received the overall #1 seed, and top seed in the Midwest Regional. Illinois defeated Fairleigh Dickinson and Nevada in the first two rounds in Indianapolis. In the Sweet Sixteen, Weber led the Illini to a victory over his alma-mater, Milwaukee, then defeated Arizona in an amazing comeback to advance to the Final Four. After leading Illinois to a win over Louisville in the Final Four, Weber could not deliver the Fighting Illini their first national championship, falling 75–70 to North Carolina in the National Championship game.

Weber coached the team to the best record in school history, finishing 37–2, and tying the NCAA record for most wins in a season. Weber won many coaching awards after the season, including the Naismith Award and the Henry Iba Award.

==== 2005–2012 ====
Despite losing three starters, including two to the NBA, the Illini finished the 2005–06 season with a 26–7 record and reached the second round of the NCAA tournament.

The 2006–07 season had a disappointing start, including the first three-game losing streak in Weber's tenure. However, the Illini rebounded to finish 23–11 and again qualify for the NCAA tournament.

The 2007–08 season marked the first time during Weber's tenure that the Illini did not qualify for a postseason tournament, finishing the season with an overall record of 16–19, 5–13 in the Big Ten.

The team improved markedly the following year, however, finishing 24–10, 11–7 in the Big Ten and returning to NCAA tournament.

After a 10–0 start to the 2011–12 season, Weber's Illini went 7–15, finishing the season with a 17–15 record.

On March 9, 2012, one day after the Illini lost its Big Ten tournament opening-round game to Iowa, Weber was relieved of his duties. During his nine-year tenure as Illinois coach, Weber amassed a Big Ten record of 89–64, and an overall record of 210–101. At the time of his firing, his overall win percentage with Illinois (67.5%) stood as second only to Bill Self in the modern era and his 210 wins were the third-most in school history, behind only Lou Henson and Harry Combes.

=== Kansas State University ===
On March 31, 2012, Weber was hired as head coach at Kansas State University, replacing Frank Martin, who had departed to become head coach at South Carolina.

In his first season at K-State, Weber led the Wildcats to 27–8 record and tied for the Big 12 Conference title with a 14–4 conference mark. The title was K-State's first regular-season conference championship since 1977. Weber was named the 2013 Big 12 Conference Men's Basketball Coach of the Year. His first season at KSU ended with an upset loss in the second round of the NCAA tournament to LaSalle, 63–61, in Kansas City's Sprint Center. The team finished ranked #12 in the nation in the AP Poll and #20 in the Coaches Poll. Senior Rodney McGruder was named first-team all-conference.

Shortly after the end of Weber's first season, starting point guard Ángel Rodríguez and two other players announced their intentions to transfer. Kansas State's roster was further thinned when incoming freshman Neville Fincher was declared ineligible for the 2013–14 season, and incoming point guard Jevon Thomas was declared ineligible for the fall semester.

Weber started his second season at Kansas State 0–1, but finished the non-conference schedule with an 8-game winning streak and a 10–3 record. In its first conference game, Kansas State upset #6 Oklahoma State and earned a #25 ranking in the following week's AP Poll. The team finished the regular season with a 20–12 record, 10–8 in the Big 12, and returned to the NCAA tournament for a school-record fifth straight season.

Weber's third season at Kansas State ended with a 15–17 record (8–10 in Big 12 play), and the school did not advance to the NCAA Tournament for the first time since 2009. The losing record was only the second for Weber in his first 17 seasons as a head coach. Following the season, Weber's squad saw the transfer and departure of six scholarship players, including Marcus Foster, Jevon Thomas, Nigel Johnson, Tre Harris and Malek Harris. The following season, Weber's Wildcats finished the 2015–16 season 17–15, 5–13 in Big 12 play.

In 2016–17, the Wildcats returned to the NCAA tournament and finished with a 21–14 (8–10) record. In 2017–18, the team improved to 25–12 (10–8) and advanced to the Elite Eight of the 2018 NCAA tournament, including a 61–58 win over Kentucky in the Sweet Sixteen. The team received a #19 national ranking at season's end in the Coaches Poll.

In 2018–19, the team tied with Texas Tech for its second regular-season Big 12 Conference title under Weber, with a 14–4 conference record. For the third consecutive season, Kansas State was invited to the NCAA tournament. After an upset first-round loss in the NCAA tournament, the team finished with a 25–9 record and a #18 national ranking in the AP Poll, and #19 ranking in the Coaches Poll. Two players from the team were named first-team all-conference: Dean Wade and Barry Brown Jr.

After winning two conference titles and making five NCAA tournament appearances in his first seven seasons at KSU, Weber's final three teams posted losing records: 11–21 in 2020, 9–20 in 2021, and 14–17 in 2022. The day after a loss to West Virginia in the Big 12 tournament, Weber announced his resignation from Kansas State.

Weber's tenure with Kansas State concluded with two conference co-championships and five NCAA Tournament appearances, including an appearance in the 2018 Elite Eight. At the time of his resignation, he ranked third on K-State's all-time total wins list, behind only Jack Hartman and Tex Winter, and 11th in overall winning percentage.

=== National team ===
In the summer of 2019, Weber coached the United States national under-19 team at the 2019 FIBA Under-19 World Cup in Heraklion, Greece. His team won the tournament championship with a 7–0 record.

== Head coaching record ==
Record table
Season	Team	Overall	Conference	Standing	Postseason
Southern Illinois Salukis (Missouri Valley Conference) (1998–2003)
1998–99	Southern Illinois	15–12	10–8	T–5th	
1999–00	Southern Illinois	20–13	12–6	3rd	NIT Second Round
2000–01	Southern Illinois	16–14	10–8	T–4th	
2001–02	Southern Illinois	28–8	14–4	T–1st	NCAA Division I Sweet 16
2002–03	Southern Illinois	24–7	16–2	1st	NCAA Division I Round of 64
Southern Illinois:		103–54 (.656)	62–28 (.689)		
Illinois Fighting Illini (Big Ten Conference) (2003–2012)
2003–04	Illinois	26–7	13–3	1st	NCAA Division I Sweet 16
2004–05	Illinois	37–2	15–1	1st	NCAA Division I Runner-up
2005–06	Illinois	26–7	11–5	T–2nd	NCAA Division I Round of 32
2006–07	Illinois	23–12	9–7	T–4th	NCAA Division I Round of 64
2007–08	Illinois	16–19	5–13	T–9th	
2008–09	Illinois	24–10	11–7	T–2nd	NCAA Division I Round of 64
2009–10	Illinois	21–15	10–8	5th	NIT Quarterfinal
2010–11	Illinois	20–14	9–9	T–4th	NCAA Division I Round of 32
2011–12	Illinois	17–15	6–12	9th	
Illinois:		210–101 (.675)	89–65 (.578)		
Kansas State Wildcats (Big 12 Conference) (2012–2022)
2012–13	Kansas State	27–8	14–4	T–1st	NCAA Division I Round of 64
2013–14	Kansas State	20–13	10–8	5th	NCAA Division I Round of 64
2014–15	Kansas State	15–17	8–10	T–6th	
2015–16	Kansas State	17–16	5–13	8th	
2016–17	Kansas State	21–14	8–10	6th	NCAA Division I Round of 64
2017–18	Kansas State	25–12	10–8	4th	NCAA Division I Elite Eight
2018–19	Kansas State	25–9	14–4	T–1st	NCAA Division I Round of 64
2019–20	Kansas State	11–21	3–15	10th	
2020–21	Kansas State	9–20	4–14	9th	
2021–22	Kansas State	14–17	6–12	9th	
Kansas State:		184–147 (.556)	82–98 (.456)		
Total:		497–302 (.622)			
National champion Postseason invitational champion Conference regular season champion Conference regular season and conference tournament champion Division regular season champion Division regular season and conference tournament champion Conference tournament champion

== Post-coaching career ==
Weber joined Big Ten Network as a studio analyst in 2022 and occasionally serves as a color commentator.

== Personal ==
Weber was born in Milwaukee to Louis and Dawn Weber, growing up with two sisters and two brothers. Weber attended the University of Wisconsin–Milwaukee, and played college baseball for the Milwaukee Panthers. He graduated from UWM in 1978 with a bachelor's degree in education. Weber added a master's degree in education administration and physical education from Western Kentucky University in 1981. He is married to Megan Weber, and has three daughters – Christy, Emily, and Hannah.

== See also ==
- List of NCAA Division I Men's Final Four appearances by coach
