= 2003–04 Michigan Wolverines men's basketball team =

American college basketball season

2003–04 Michigan Wolverines men's basketball

National Invitational Tournament champions
- Conference: Big Ten Conference
- Record: 23–11 (8–8 Big Ten)
- Head coach: Tommy Amaker (3rd season)
- Assistant coaches: Charles Ramsey; Chuck Swenson; Andrew Moore
- MVPs: Bernard Robinson, Jr.; Lester Abram
- Captains: Colin Dill; J.C. Mathis
- Home arena: Crisler Arena

2003–04 Big Ten Conference men's basketball standings
	Conf.				Overall
Team	W		L	PCT	W		L	PCT
No. 13 Illinois	13	–	3	.813	26	–	7	.788
No. 10 Wisconsin †	12	–	4	.750	25	–	7	.781
Michigan State	12	–	4	.750	18	–	12	.600
Iowa	9	–	7	.563	16	–	13	.552
Michigan	8	–	8	.500	23	–	11	.676
Northwestern	8	–	8	.500	14	–	15	.483
Purdue	7	–	9	.438	17	–	14	.548
Indiana	7	–	9	.438	14	–	15	.483
Ohio State	6	–	10	.375	14	–	16	.467
Minnesota	3	–	13	.188	12	–	18	.400
Penn State	3	–	13	.188	9	–	19	.321
† 2004 Big Ten tournament winner Rankings from AP poll

The 2003–04 Michigan Wolverines men's basketball team represented the University of Michigan in intercollegiate college basketball during the 2003–04 NCAA Division I men's basketball season. The team played its home games in the Crisler Arena in Ann Arbor, Michigan, and was a member of the Big Ten Conference. Under the direction of head coach Tommy Amaker, the team finished tied for fifth in the Big Ten Conference. The team earned a fifth place seed and advanced to the semifinals of the 2004 Big Ten Conference men's basketball tournament. The team won the 2004 National Invitation Tournament. The team was unranked for all eighteen weeks of Associated Press Top Twenty-Five Poll, and it also ended the season unranked in the final USA Today/CNN Poll. The team had a 1–2 record against ranked opponents, with the lone victory coming against #12 Wisconsin 71–59 on February 22 at Crisler Arena.

Colin Dill and J. C. Mathis served as team co-captains, and Lester Abram and Bernard Robinson, Jr. shared team MVP honors. The team's leading scorers were Daniel Horton (415 points), Bernard Robinson, Jr. (411 points) and Lester Abram (405 points). The leading rebounders were Robinson (194), Courtney Sims (161) and Graham Brown (139).

Courtney Sims won the Big Ten Conference statistical championship for blocked shots with a 2.00 average in all games. The team led the conference in rebounding margin with a 3.4 average margin in conference games as well as blocked shots with a 4.31 team average in conference games.

In the 2004 Big Ten Conference men's basketball tournament at the Conseco Fieldhouse from March 11–14, Michigan was seeded fifth and earned a first round bye. Then, in the second round they defeated number 4 Iowa79–70 before being defeated by number 1 Illinois 74–60.

On March 16, 2004, Michigan defeated Missouri 65–64 at Crisler Arena in the first round of the 2004 National Invitation Tournament. Then, Michigan defeated Oklahoma 63–52 and Hawaii 88–73 on March 22 and March 24 at Crisler Arena, respectively. At the final four in New York City at Madison Square Garden, the team defeated Oregon 78–53 in the semifinals on March 30 and Rutgers 62–55 to win the championship on April 1.

== National Invitation tournament ==
- First Round
  - Michigan 65, Missouri 64
- Second Round
  - Michigan 63, Oklahoma 52
- Quarterfinal
  - Michigan 88, Hawaii 73
- Semifinal
  - Michigan 78, Oregon 53
- Final
  - Michigan 62, Rutgers 55

== Roster ==
2003–04 Michigan Wolverines men's basketball team
Players
Coaches

Pos.	#	Name	Height	Weight	Year	Previous school	Hometown
F	32	Lester Abram	—	—	So
G	11	John Andrews	—	—	Fr
C	50	Amadou Ba	—	—	So
		Ashtyn Bell	—	—	Fr
F		Graham Brown	—	—	So
F	40	Colin Dill	—	—	Sr
G		Sherrod Harrell	—	—	So
G	5	Dion Harris	—	—	Fr	Redford	Detroit, Michigan
G		Daniel Horton	—	—	So
F	31	Chris Hunter	—	—	So
F		J.C. Mathis	—	—	Sr
F		Brent Petway	—	—	Fr
F	21	Bernard Robinson	—	—	Sr
C	44	Courtney Sims	—	—	Fr
G	3	Dani Wohl	—	—	So

Head coach

- Tommy Amaker

Assistant coach(es)

Legend

- (C) Team captain
- (S) Suspended
- (I) Ineligible
- (W) Walk-on
- Injured
- Current redshirt

Roster
Last update: 2016-Mar-19

== Statistics ==
The team posted the following statistics:

Name	GP	GS	Min	Avg	FG	FGA	FG%	3FG	3FGA	3FG%	FT	FTA	FT%	OR	DR	RB	Avg	Ast	Avg	PF	DQ	TO	Stl	Blk	Pts	Avg
Daniel Horton (basketball)	34	32	1074	31.6	134	366	0.366	68	199	0.342	79	112	0.705	12	85	97	2.9	122	3.6	81	2	103	60	8	415	12.2
Bernard Robinson Jr.	34	33	1095	32.2	150	347	0.432	17	68	0.250	94	122	0.770	36	158	194	5.7	130	3.8	84	2	93	64	10	411	12.1
Lester Abram	31	24	913	29.4	126	257	0.490	40	97	0.412	113	134	0.843	35	96	131	4.2	41	1.3	79	2	55	31	9	405	13.1
Dion Harris	34	11	956	28.1	112	285	0.393	58	170	0.341	61	79	0.772	20	54	74	2.2	76	2.2	71	0	66	34	3	343	10.1
Courtney Sims	34	34	750	22.1	105	192	0.547	1	8	0.125	52	90	0.578	63	98	161	4.7	18	0.5	72	0	51	12	68	263	7.7
Graham Brown	34	28	673	19.8	62	120	0.517	0	0		32	56	0.571	58	81	139	4.1	15	0.4	70	1	48	26	9	156	4.6
Brent Petway	33	0	446	13.5	55	83	0.663	0	0		18	32	0.563	37	75	112	3.4	7	0.2	35	0	17	7	28	128	3.9
Chris Hunter (basketball)	22	5	332	15.1	34	68	0.500	4	11	0.364	37	46	0.804	28	46	74	3.4	11	0.5	45	0	23	11	15	109	5.0
J.C. Mathis	26	1	407	15.7	42	88	0.477	2	7	0.286	14	42	0.333	46	54	100	3.9	20	0.8	39	1	32	4	8	100	3.9
Sherrod Harrell	25	1	112	4.5	1	11	0.091	1	9	0.111	3	6	0.500	0	14	14	0.6	2	0.1	7	0	6	7	0	6	0.2
John Andrews	7	0	11	1.6	1	3	0.333	1	2	0.500	0	0		0	2	2	0.3	0	0.0	2	0	0	0	0	3	0.4
Dani Wohl	8	0	13	1.6	1	3	0.333	0	0		0	1	0.000	0	1	1	0.1	1	0.1	1	0	1	1	0	2	0.3
Colin Dill	10	1	22	2.2	0	4	0.000	0	4	0.000	0	2	0.000	0	0	0	0.0	2	0.2	0	0	2	0	0	0	0.0
Amadou Ba	7	0	15	2.1	0	1	0.000	0	0		0	0		0	3	3	0.4	0	0.0	0	0	2	0	0	0	0.0
Ashtyn Bell	4	0	6	1.5	0	3	0.000	0	0		0	1	0.000	1	1	2	0.5	0	0.0	0	0	0	2	0	0	0.0
TEAM	34													62	53	115	3.4					8				
Season Total	34				823	1831	0.449	192	575	0.334	503	723	0.696	398	821	1219	35.9	445	13.1	586	8	507	259	158	2341	68.9
Opponents	34				771	1856	0.415	208	642	0.324	400	567	0.705	347	726	1073	31.6	456	13.4	661	22	506	207	108	2150	63.2

== Awards and honors ==
- Daniel Horton, NIT Most Valuable Player

== Team players drafted into the NBA ==
Year	Round	Pick	Overall	Player	NBA club
2004	2	15	45	Bernard Robinson	Charlotte Bobcats

== See also ==
- Michigan Wolverines men's basketball
- 2004 National Invitation Tournament
- NIT all-time team records
- NIT bids by school and conference
- NIT championships and semifinal appearances
