= 2004 National Invitation Tournament =

Postseason college basketball event

- Season: 2003–04
- Teams: 40
- Finals site: Madison Square Garden, New York City
- Champions: Michigan Wolverines (3rd title)
- Runner-up: Rutgers Scarlet Knights (1st title game)
- Semifinalists: Iowa State Cyclones (1st semifinal); Oregon Ducks (3rd semifinal)
- Winning coach: Tommy Amaker (1st title)
- MVP: Daniel Horton (Michigan)

The 2004 National Invitation Tournament was the 2004 edition of the annual NCAA college basketball competition. Michigan (initially barred from postseason play that season, but overturned on appeal) defeated Rutgers in the final game to capture their third NIT Championship.

== Selected teams ==
Below is a list of the 40 teams selected for the tournament.

School	Conference	Record	Appearance	Last bid
Austin Peay	Ohio Valley	21–9	1st	Never
Belmont	Atlantic Sun	21–8	1st	Never
Boise State	WAC	21–9	4th	1991
Boston University	America East	23–5	4th	2003
Colorado	Big 12	18–10	7th	2000
Creighton	Missouri Valley	20–8	7th	1998
Drexel	Colonial	18–10	3rd	2003
Florida State	ACC	18–13	4th	1997
George Mason	Colonial	21–9	3rd	2002
George Washington	Atlantic 10	18–11	4th	1997
Georgia	SEC	16–13	10th	1999
Hawaii	WAC	19–11	8th	2003
Iowa	Big Ten	16–12	5th	2003
Iowa State	Big 12	17–12	3rd	2003
Kent State	MAC	22–7	6th	2003
LSU	SEC	18–10	5th	2002
Marquette	C-USA	17–11	14th	2000
Michigan	Big Ten	18–11	8th	2000
Milwaukee	Horizon	19–10	1st	Never
Missouri	Big 12	16–13	6th	1998
Nebraska	Big 12	16–12	13th	1999
Niagara	MAAC	21–9	12th	1993
Notre Dame	Big East	17–12	8th	2000
Oklahoma	Big 12	19–10	7th	1994
Oregon	Pac-10	15–12	9th	1999
Purdue	Big Ten	17–13	8th	2001
Rhode Island	Atlantic 10	19–13	11th	2003
Rice	WAC	22–10	4th	1993
Rutgers	Big East	16–12	13th	2002
Saint Louis	C-USA	18–12	18th	2003
Temple	Atlantic 10	15–13	15th	2003
Tennessee	SEC	15–13	11th	2003
Toledo	MAC	20–10	6th	2001
Troy State	A-Sun	24–6	1st	Never
UNLV	Mountain West	18–12	8th	2003
Utah State	Big West	25–3	7th	2002
Villanova	Big East	16–16	17th	2003
Virginia	ACC	17–12	11th	2003
West Virginia	Big East	15–13	14th	2001
Wichita State	Missouri Valley	21–10	9th	2003

== Bracket ==
Below are the four first round brackets, along with the four-team championship bracket.

Opening Round
West Virginia	65
Kent State	54
Rhode Island	80
Boston University	52

First Round
Villanova	85
Drexel	70
Virginia	79
George Washington	66
Rutgers	76
Temple	71
West Virginia	79
Rhode Island	72

Second Round
Villanova	73
Virginia	63
Rutgers	67
West Virginia	64

Quarterfinals
Villanova	60
Rutgers	72

Opening Round
Boise State	84
UNLV	69
Milwaukee	91
Rice	53

First Round
Boise State	73
Milwaukee	70
Marquette	87
Toledo	72
Florida State	91
Wichita State	84^{2OT}
Iowa State	82
Georgia	74

Second Round
Boise State	53
Marquette	66
Florida State	59
Iowa State	62

Quarterfinals
Marquette	69
Iowa State	77

Opening Round
George Mason	58
Tennessee	55
Austin Peay	65
Belmont	59

First Round
Notre Dame	71
Purdue	59
Saint Louis	70
Iowa	69
Oregon	77
Colorado	72^{OT}
George Mason	66
Austin Peay	60

Second Round
Notre Dame	77
Saint Louis	66
Oregon	68
George Mason	54

Quarterfinals
Notre Dame	61
Oregon	65

Opening Round
Nebraska	71
Creighton	70
Niagara	87
Troy State	83

First Round
Nebraska	78
Niagara	70
Hawaii	85
Utah State	74
Oklahoma	70
LSU	61
Michigan	65
Missouri	64

Second Round
Nebraska	83
Hawaii	84
Oklahoma	52
Michigan	63

Quarterfinals
Hawaii	73
Michigan	88

=== Semifinals & finals ===
Semifinals
Rutgers	84
Iowa State	81^{OT}
Oregon	53
Michigan	78

Finals
Rutgers	55
Michigan	62

== See also ==
- 2004 Women's National Invitation Tournament
- 2004 NCAA Division I men's basketball tournament
- 2004 NCAA Division II men's basketball tournament
- 2004 NCAA Division III men's basketball tournament
- 2004 NCAA Division I women's basketball tournament
- 2004 NAIA Division I men's basketball tournament
- 2004 NAIA Division II men's basketball tournament
