= 2003–04 Eastern Illinois Panthers men's basketball team =

American college basketball season

2003–04 Eastern Illinois Panthers men's basketball
- Conference: Ohio Valley Conference
- Record: 6–21 (4–12 OVC)
- Head coach: Rick Samuels (24th season)
- Home arena: Lantz Arena

2003–04 Ohio Valley Conference men's basketball standings
	Conf.				Overall
Team	W		L	PCT	W		L	PCT
Austin Peay	16	–	0	1.000	22	–	10	.688
Murray State †	14	–	2	.875	28	–	6	.824
Morehead State	10	–	6	.625	16	–	13	.552
Eastern Kentucky	8	–	8	.500	14	–	15	.483
Samford	7	–	9	.438	12	–	16	.429
Jacksonville State	7	–	9	.438	14	–	14	.500
Tennessee Tech	7	–	9	.438	13	–	15	.464
Tennessee State	6	–	10	.375	7	–	21	.250
UT Martin	5	–	11	.313	10	–	18	.357
Eastern Illinois	4	–	12	.250	6	–	21	.222
Southeast Missouri State	4	–	12	.250	11	–	16	.407
† 2004 OVC tournament winner Rankings from AP Poll

The 2003–04 Eastern Illinois Panthers men's basketball team represented the Eastern Illinois University during the 2003–04 NCAA Division I men's basketball season. This was Rick Samuels' 24th season as head coach at Eastern Illinois. They finished the season with a record of 6–21, 4–12.

True sophomore Josh Gomes was the team's leading scorer with 13.6 points along with senior center Jesse Mackinson with 5.3 rebounds. Other statistical leaders include true freshman guard Derik Hollyfield with 2.7 assists.

== Roster ==
2003–04 Eastern Illinois Panthers men's basketball team
Players	Coaches
Pos. / # / Name / Height / Weight / Year / Hometown; G / / Josh Gomes / 6 ft 3 in (1.91 m) / — / Sr	Head coach: Rick Samuels; Assistant coach(es) Legend: (C) Team captain; (S) Suspended; (I) Ineligible; (W) Walk-on; Injured; Current redshirt; Roster

== Schedule and results ==
Date time, TV	Rank^{#}	Opponent^{#}	Result	Record	Site city, state
Non-conference regular season
Nov 22, 2003*		at Northern Illinois	L 78–83	0–1	Convocation Center; DeKalb, Illinois
Nov 25, 2003*; 7:05 pm		at No. 15 Wisconsin	L 47–81	0–2	Kohl Center; Madison, Wisconsin
Dec 2, 2003*		Illinois-Chicago	L 60–77	0–3	Lantz Arena; Charleston, Illinois
Dec 6, 2003*		Indiana State	L 56–71	0–4	Lantz Arena; Charleston, Illinois
Dec 10, 2003*		St. Francis (IL)	W 80–57	1–4	Lantz Arena; Charleston, Illinois
Dec 13, 2003*		at Evansville	L 76–86	1–5	Roberts Municipal Stadium; Evansville, Indiana
Dec 20, 2003*		at Western Illinois	L 79–84	1–6	Western Hall; Macomb, Illinois
Dec 23, 2003*		at Ohio State	L 50–69	1–7	Value City Arena; Columbus, Ohio
Dec 30, 2003*		at Iowa	L 62–71	1–8	Carver-Hawkeye Arena; Iowa City, Iowa
Jan 3, 2004*		Illinois College	W 93–75	2–8	Lantz Arena; Charleston, Illinois
OVC regular season
Jan 8, 2004		Tennessee Tech	W 83–70	3–8 (1–0)	Lantz Arena; Charleston, Illinois
Jan 10, 2004		Austin Peay	L 53–60	3–9 (1–1)	Lantz Arena; Charleston, Illinois
Jan 13, 2004		Southeast Missouri State	L 64–84	3–10 (1–2)	Lantz Arena; Charleston, Illinois
Jan 17, 2004		Tennessee State	L 59–60	3–11 (1–3)	Lantz Arena; Charleston, Illinois
Jan 22, 2004		at Austin Peay	L 57–64	3–12 (1–4)	Winfield Dunn Center; Clarksville, Tennessee
Jan 24, 2004		at Tennessee Tech	L 67–84	3–13 (1–5)	Eblen Center; Cookeville, Tennessee
Jan 29, 2004		at Samford	L 69–73	3–14 (1–6)	Seibert Hall; Homewood, Alabama
Jan 31, 2004		at Jacksonville State	L 73–78	3–15 (1–7)	Pete Mathews Coliseum; Jacksonville, Alabama
Feb 5, 2004		Murray State	L 67–85	3–16 (1–8)	Lantz Arena; Charleston, Illinois
Feb 7, 2004		Tennessee-Martin	W 83–79 ^{OT}	4–16 (2–8)	Lantz Arena; Charleston, Illinois
Feb 10, 2004		at Southeast Missouri State	W 89–85	5–16 (3–8)	Show Me Center; Cape Girardeau, Missouri
Feb 12, 2004		at Tennessee State	L 68–75	5–17 (3–9)	Gentry Complex; Nashville, Tennessee
Feb 16, 2004*		Florida Gulf Coast	L 72–81	5–18 (3–9)	Lantz Arena; Charleston, Illinois
Feb 19, 2004		Morehead State	W 78–59	6–18 (4–10)	Lantz Arena; Charleston, Illinois
Feb 21, 2004		Eastern Kentucky	L 67–71	6–19 (4–11)	Lantz Arena; Charleston, Illinois
Feb 26, 2004		at Tennessee-Martin	L 73–77	6–20 (4–12)	Skyhawk Arena; Union City, Tennessee
Feb 28, 2004		at Murray State	L 51–81	6–21 (4–13)	CFSB Center; Murray, Kentucky
*Non-conference game. ^{#}Rankings from AP Poll. (#) Tournament seedings in parentheses. All times are in Central Time.
