= 2003–04 Michigan State Spartans men's basketball team =

American college basketball season

2003–04 Michigan State Spartans men's basketball

Spartan Classic champions

NCAA tournament, first round
- Conference: Big Ten Conference
- Record: 18–12 (12–4 Big Ten)
- Head coach: Tom Izzo (9th season)
- Assistant coaches: Mark Montgomery (3rd season); Doug Wojcik (1st season); Dwayne Stephens (1st season)
- Captains: Alan Anderson; Jason Andreas; Kelvin Torbert
- Home arena: Breslin Center

2003–04 Big Ten Conference men's basketball standings
	Conf.				Overall
Team	W		L	PCT	W		L	PCT
No. 13 Illinois	13	–	3	.813	26	–	7	.788
No. 10 Wisconsin †	12	–	4	.750	25	–	7	.781
Michigan State	12	–	4	.750	18	–	12	.600
Iowa	9	–	7	.563	16	–	13	.552
Michigan	8	–	8	.500	23	–	11	.676
Northwestern	8	–	8	.500	14	–	15	.483
Purdue	7	–	9	.438	17	–	14	.548
Indiana	7	–	9	.438	14	–	15	.483
Ohio State	6	–	10	.375	14	–	16	.467
Minnesota	3	–	13	.188	12	–	18	.400
Penn State	3	–	13	.188	9	–	19	.321
† 2004 Big Ten tournament winner Rankings from AP poll

The 2003–04 Michigan State Spartans men's basketball team represented Michigan State University in the 2003–04 NCAA Division I men's basketball season. The Spartans played their home games at Breslin Center in East Lansing, Michigan. They were coached by Tom Izzo in his ninth year as head coach. MSU finished the season with a record of 18–12, 12–4 to finish in a tie for second place in Big Ten play. The Spartans received a bid to the NCAA tournament for the seventh consecutive year where they lost in the First Round to Nevada.

== Previous season ==
The Spartans finished the 2002–03 season with an overall record of 22–12, 10–6 to finish in fifth place in the Big Ten. Michigan State received a No. 7 seed in the NCAA tournament, their sixth straight trip to the Tournament, and advanced to the Elite Eight, their fourth trip to the Elite Eight under Tom Izzo.

== Season summary ==
The Spartans were led by sophomore Paul Davis (15.9 PPG, 6.2 PRG, 2.0 APG) and juniors Chris Hill (13.8 PPG, 2.8 RPG, 3.9 APG) and Kelvin Tolbert (10.7 PPG, 3.6 RPG, 2.0 PAG). The Spartans began the season ranked No. 3 in the country and faced a difficult non-conference schedule. MSU fell on the road to No. 6 Kansas in the second game of the season. Two wins followed the loss before a murderer's row of a schedule which included three straight losses to No. 6 Duke, in overtime to No. 14 Oklahoma at the Palace of Auburn Hills, and to No. 8 Kentucky at Ford Field in the Basketbowl. The Spartans followed this losing streak by losing two of their final four non-conference games including at No. 17 Syracuse and dropped out of the rankings. They finished the non-conference slate at 5–6.

After a loss to open Big Ten play to No. 21 Wisconsin, the Spartans recovered to win seven of their next eight and six of their last seven Big Ten games. They finished in a tie for second place in the Big Ten at 12–4 and 17–10 overall. A win over Northwestern in the Big Ten tournament quarterfinals was followed by a third loss of the season to No. 17 Wisconsin.

The Spartans received a No. 7 seed in the NCAA Tournament, reaching the tournament for the seventh consecutive year. But, for the second time in three years, the Spartans were knocked out in the First Round, this time by Nevada.

== Roster ==
2003–04 Michigan State Spartans men's basketball team
Players
Coaches

Pos.	#	Name	Height	Weight	Year	Previous school	Hometown
G	13	Maurice Ager	6 ft 4 in (1.93 m)	—	So	Crockett	Detroit, MI
G/F	15	Alan Anderson	6 ft 6 in (1.98 m)	—	Jr	DeLaSalle	Minneapolis, MN
C	44	Jason Andreas	6 ft 10 in (2.08 m)	—	Sr
G	30	Tim Bograkos	6 ft 2 in (1.88 m)	—	Jr
G	3	Shannon Brown	6 ft 3 in (1.91 m)	—	Fr	Proviso East	Maywood, IL
G	2	Brandon Cotton	6 ft 0 in (1.83 m)	—	Fr
C	40	Paul Davis	6 ft 11 in (2.11 m)	—	So	Rochester	Rochester, MI
G	22	Anthony Hamo	6 ft 2 in (1.88 m)	—	Fr
F	43	Andy Harvey	6 ft 5 in (1.96 m)	—	So
G	5	Chris Hill	6 ft 3 in (1.91 m)	—	Jr	Lawrence North	Indianapolis, IN
G	11	Rashi Johnson	6 ft 2 in (1.88 m)	—	Sr
C	34	Drew Naymick	6 ft 10 in (2.08 m)	—	Fr	North Muskegon	Muskegon, MI
C	54	Justin Ockerman	6 ft 9 in (2.06 m)	—	Fr
F	50	Delco Rowley	6 ft 8 in (2.03 m)	—	Fr
G	23	Kelvin Torbert	6 ft 4 in (1.93 m)	—	Jr
F	20	Matt Trannon	6 ft 6 in (1.98 m)	—	So		Flint, MI

Head coach

- Tom Izzo (Northern Michigan)

Assistant coach(es)

- Mark Montgomery (Michigan State)
- Doug Wojcik (Navy)
- Dwayne Stephens (Michigan State)

Legend

- (C) Team captain
- (S) Suspended
- (I) Ineligible
- (W) Walk-on
- Injured
- Current redshirt

Roster

== Schedule and results ==
Date time, TV	Rank^{#}	Opponent^{#}	Result	Record	Site city, state
Exhibition
Nov 2, 2003; 2:30 pm, ESPN		Harlem Globetrotters	L 83–97		Breslin Center (14,759); East Lansing, MI
Nov 13, 2003		Nike Elite	W 85–81		Breslin Center (14,759); East Lansing, MI
Non-conference regular season
Nov 21, 2003*; 7:05 pm	No. 3	Bucknell	W 64–52	1–0	Breslin Center (14,759); East Lansing, MI
Nov 25, 2003*	No. 3	at No. 6 Kansas	L 74–81	1–1	Allen Fieldhouse (16,300); Lawrence, KS
Nov 29, 2003*; 2:00 pm	No. 3	Pennsylvania; Spartan Classic	W 77–52	2–1	Breslin Center (14,759); East Lansing, MI
Nov 30, 2003*; 4:10 pm	No. 3	DePaul; Spartan Classic	W 89–81	3–1	Breslin Center (14,759); East Lansing, MI
Dec 3, 2003*	No. 5	No. 6 Duke; ACC-Big Ten Challenge	L 50–72	3–2	Breslin Center (14,759); East Lansing, MI
Dec 6, 2003*	No. 5	vs. No. 14 Oklahoma; Spartan Clash	L 77–80 ^{OT}	3–3	The Palace of Auburn Hills (18,123); Auburn Hills, MI
Dec 13, 2003*; 4:00 pm, CBS	No. 21	vs. No. 8 Kentucky; Basketbowl	L 74–79	3–4	Ford Field (78,129); Detroit, MI
Dec 16, 2003*		South Florida	W 73–60	4–4	Breslin Center (14,759); East Lansing, MI
Dec 20, 2003*		at UCLA	L 58–64	4–5	Pauley Pavilion (12,433); Los Angeles, CA
Dec 30, 2003*; 7:00 pm		Coppin State	W 78–72	5–5	Breslin Center (14,759); East Lansing, MI
Jan 3, 2004*; 12:05 pm, CBS		at No. 17 Syracuse	L 60–73	5–6	Carrier Dome (25,869); Syracuse, NY
Big Ten regular season
Jan 10, 2004; 11:01 am		at No. 21 Wisconsin	L 64–77	5–7 (0–1)	Kohl Center (17,142); Madison, WI
Jan 14, 2004; 8:00 pm		Penn State	W 76–58	6–7 (1–1)	Breslin Center (14,759); East Lansing, MI
Jan 17, 2004; 3:45 pm, CBS		Michigan; Rivalry	W 71–54	7–7 (2–1)	Breslin Center (14,759); East Lansing, MI
Jan 21, 2004; 7:00 pm		at Northwestern	W 73–61	8–7 (3–1)	Welsh-Ryan Arena (5,743); Evanston, IL
Jan 25, 2004; 2:00 pm, CBS		at No. 23 Purdue	L 70–76 ^{OT}	8–8 (3–2)	Mackey Arena (14,123); West Lafayette, IN
Jan 28, 2004; 8:00 pm		at Minnesota	W 79–78 ^{OT}	9–8 (4–2)	Williams Arena (12,601); Minneapolis, MN
Jan 31, 2004; 8:00 pm		Indiana	W 84–72	10–8 (5–2)	Breslin Center (14,759); East Lansing, MI
Feb 4, 2004; 8:00 pm		Iowa	W 89–72	11–8 (6–2)	Breslin Center (14,759); East Lansing, MI
Feb 7, 2004; 12:00 pm		at Ohio State	W 84–70	12–8 (7–2)	Value City Arena (17,337); Columbus, OH
Feb 10, 2004; 8:00 pm		at Illinois	L 51–75	12–9 (7–3)	Assembly Hall (16,618); Champaign, IL
Feb 14, 2004; 12:17 pm		Minnesota	W 69–58	13–9 (8–3)	Breslin Center (14,759); East Lansing, MI
Feb 17, 2004; 7:00 pm		Purdue	W 62–55	14–9 (9–3)	Breslin Center (14,759); East Lansing, MI
Feb 21, 2004		Northwestern	W 66–56	15–9 (10–3)	Breslin Center (14,759); East Lansing, MI
Feb 24, 2004; 7:00 pm		at Michigan; Rivalry	W 72–69	16–9 (11–3)	Crisler Arena (13,751); Ann Arbor, MI
Feb 28, 2004; 12:15 pm		at Penn State	W 67–47	17–9 (12–3)	Bryce Jordan Center (11,777); State College, PA
Mar 2, 2004		No. 17 Wisconsin	L 64–68 ^{OT}	17–10 (12–4)	Breslin Center (14,759); East Lansing, MI
Big Ten tournament
Mar 12, 2004; ESPN Plus	(3)	vs. (6) Northwestern quarterfinals	W 68–55	18–10	Conseco Fieldhouse (15,178); Indianapolis, IN
Mar 13, 2004; CBS	(3)	vs. (2) No. 10 Wisconsin semifinals	L 66–68	18–11	Conseco Fieldhouse (15,903); Indianapolis, IN
NCAA tournament
Mar 18, 2004; CBS	(7 E)	vs. (10 E) Nevada; First Round	L 66–72	18–12	KeyArena (15,827); Seattle, WA
*Non-conference game. ^{#}Rankings from AP Poll. (#) Tournament seedings in parentheses. All times are in Eastern Time Source.

== Player statistics ==
Individual player statistics (Final)
		Scoring		Total FGs			3-point FGs			Free-Throws			Rebounds				
Player	GP	Pts	Avg	FG	FGA	Pct	3FG	3FA	Pct	FT	FTA	Pct	Tot	Avg	A	Stl	Blk
Ager, Maurice	30	254	8.5	87	225	.387	37	106	.349	43	61	.705	96	3.2	20	12	8
Anderson, Alan	30	243	8.1	78	167	.467	17	48	.354	70	87	.805	93	3.1	96	29	5
Andreas, Jason	30	85	2.8	38	69	.551	0	0		9	10	.900	69	0.5	15	6	6
Bograkos, Tim	30	28	0.9	13	24	.542	1	5	.200	1	3	.333	24	0.4	12	8	4
Brown, Shannon	30	237	7.9	88	195	.451	15	44	.341	46	57	.807	75	1.3	38	33	1
Cotton, Brandon	3	3	1.0	1	3	.333	0	1	.000	1	2	.500	0	1.0	3	0	0
Davis, Paul	30	474	15.8	163	287	.568	5	15	.333	143	179	.799	187	2.0	59	44	19
Hamo, Anthony	5	2	0.4	1	1	1.000	0	0		0	0		0	0.0	0	1	0
Harvey, Andy	6	0	0.0	0	1	.000	0	0		0	0		1	0.2	0	0	0
Hill, Chris	30	415	13.8	141	282	.500	84	185	.454	49	65	.754	84	2.8	118	46	1
Johnson, Rashi	27	19	0.7	7	19	.368	0	6	.000	5	10	.500	14	0.5	12	4	0
Naymick, Drew	22	13	0.6	4	10	.400	0	0		5	6	.833	21	1.0	2	2	1
Ockerman, Justin	15	6	0.4	3	6	.500	0	0		0	0		8	0.5	1	3	1
Rowley, Delco	14	17	1.2	7	13	.538	0	0		3	5	.600	16	1.1	2	0	0
Torbert, Kelvin	30	321	10.7	109	204	.534	31	64	.484	72	90	.800	108	3.6	60	23	7
Trannon, Matt	17	21	1.2	8	13	.615	0	0		5	11	.455	28	1.6	3	3	1

Legend
GP	Games played	Avg	Average per game
FG	Field-goals made	FGA	Field-goal attempts
Blk	Blocks	Stl	Steals	A	Assists

== Rankings ==
Ranking movement Legend: ██ Increase in ranking. ██ Decrease in ranking. (RV) Received votes but unranked. (NR) Not ranked.
Poll	Pre	Wk 2	Wk 3	Wk 4	Wk 5	Wk 6	Wk 7	Wk 8	Wk 9	Wk 10	Wk 11	Wk 12	Wk 13	Wk 14	Wk 15	Wk 16	Wk 17	Wk 18	Wk 19	Final
AP	3	3	5	21	NR	NR	NR	NR	NR	NR	NR	NR	NR	NR	NR	NR	NR	NR	NR	N/A*
Coaches	4	3	6	20	25	NR	NR	NR	NR	NR	NR	NR	NR	NR	NR	NR	NR	NR	NR	NR

*AP does not release post-NCAA tournament rankings

== Awards and honors ==
- Paul Davis – All-Big Ten First Team
- Paul Davis – NABC All-District Team
- Chris Hill – All-Big Ten Second Team
- Chris Hill – Academic All-American First Team
- Kelvin Torbert – All-Big Ten Third Team (Coaches), All-Big Ten Honorable Mention (Media)
- Shannon Brown – All-Big Ten Freshman Team
