= Jerrance Howard =

American basketball coach (born 1980)

Current position
- Title: Assistant coach
- Conference: Big 12 Conference

Biographical details
- Born: May 29, 1980 (age 46); Peoria, Illinois, U.S.

Playing career
- 1999–2004: Illinois
- Position: Guard

Coaching career (HC unless noted)
- 2007–2012: Illinois (asst.)
- 2012–2013: SMU (asst.)
- 2013–2021: Kansas (asst.)
- 2021–2022: Texas (asst.)
- 2023–2024: Southern Illinois (asst.)
- 2024–2026: Arizona State (asst.)

Jerrance Howard (born May 29, 1980) is an American men's college basketball coach who most recently was an assistant coach at Arizona State.

Since his time at Kansas, Howard has been known as one of the top recruiters in the nation. Two months after arriving at KU, Howard was ranked 12th among the top recruiting assistant coaches in NCAA Division I by ESPN.com in a survey of more than 200 head coaches.

== Playing career ==
A Peoria, Illinois native, Howard was a four-year letter winner for the Fighting Illini from 2000 to 2004, including three seasons for Bill Self. During his career, Illinois compiled a record of 104–31 overall and was 48–16 in the Big ten conference. The Illini won three Big Ten Championships (2001, 2002, 2004), a Big Ten Tournament Title (2003), and appeared in the NCAA Tournament all four years, advancing to the Elite Eight in 2001 and the Sweet 16 in both 2002 and 2004. Howard

Howard brings with him a strong playing career, over half of which was spent under Bill Self. He played point guard for the Illini along with All-Americans Frank Williams, Dee Brown, and Deron Williams. Howard developed a reputation as the program's inspirational leader and was a team captain in his junior and senior seasons. He also was a two-time winner of the Kenny Battle Award, an accolade voted upon by the players and coaches and given to an Illini who earns the respect of his teammates through hard work and effort in games and practice each day.

=== College statistics ===
Year	Team	GP	GS	MPG	FG%	3P%	FT%	RPG	APG	SPG	BPG	PPG
2000–01	Illinois	25	0	3.4	.267	.000	.500	0.4	0.4	0	.0	0.4
2001–02	Illinois	21	0	3.9	.389	.286	1.000	0.6	0.7	0.2	.0	1.0
2002–03	Illinois	14	1	3.7	.250	.167		0.2	0.5	0	.0	0.6
2003–04	Illinois	18	0	4.3	.357	.364	.833	0.4	0.5	0.3	0.1	1.1

== Coaching career ==
Howard came to Kansas after one season in the same position on Larry Brown’s staff at SMU. Prior to SMU, Howard spent the previous five seasons as an assistant coach at his alma mater, Illinois. He was also the interim head coach for the Illini. While at Illinois, he earned a reputation as one of the top young assistant coaches in the country and one of the nation’s best recruiters. Before Illinois, Howard spent three-plus seasons on Billy Gillispie’s staffs at Texas A&M and Kentucky.

In May 2013, Kansas head coach Bill Self hired Jerrance Howard as the Jayhawks’ third assistant coach. Howard filled the opening created when assistant Joe Dooley left to take the coaching job at Florida Gulf Coast in mid-April.

In April 2021, Bill Self announced that Howard had taken an assistant job under new University of Texas coach Chris Beard. On April 19, 2023, Howard was announced as an assistant coach under Bryan Mullins at Southern Illinois. A year later, Arizona State announced that Howard would join their coaching staff.

== Personal life ==
Howard earned a bachelor's degree in speech communication from the University of Illinois in 2004. He is married to the former Jessica Wordlaw, who also is an Illinois graduate. The Howards have a son, Jerrance Jr., and a daughter, Jaya Brooklyn-Rose.
