= 2003–04 Indiana Hoosiers men's basketball team =

American college basketball season

2003–04 Indiana Hoosiers men's basketball
- Conference: Big Ten Conference
- Record: 14–15 (7–9 Big Ten)
- Head coach: Mike Davis (4th season)
- Assistant coach: Jim Thomas
- Home arena: Assembly Hall

2003–04 Big Ten Conference men's basketball standings
	Conf.				Overall
Team	W		L	PCT	W		L	PCT
No. 13 Illinois	13	–	3	.813	26	–	7	.788
No. 10 Wisconsin †	12	–	4	.750	25	–	7	.781
Michigan State	12	–	4	.750	18	–	12	.600
Iowa	9	–	7	.563	16	–	13	.552
Michigan	8	–	8	.500	23	–	11	.676
Northwestern	8	–	8	.500	14	–	15	.483
Purdue	7	–	9	.438	17	–	14	.548
Indiana	7	–	9	.438	14	–	15	.483
Ohio State	6	–	10	.375	14	–	16	.467
Minnesota	3	–	13	.188	12	–	18	.400
Penn State	3	–	13	.188	9	–	19	.321
† 2004 Big Ten tournament winner Rankings from AP poll

The 2003–04 Indiana Hoosiers men's basketball team represented Indiana University in the 2003–04 college basketball season. Their head coach was Mike Davis, who was in his fourth season. The team played its home games at Assembly Hall in Bloomington, Indiana, and was a member of the Big Ten Conference.

Indiana finished the season with an overall record of 14–15 and a conference record of 7–9, finishing 8th place in the Big Ten Conference. Due to finishing under .500, the Hoosiers were not invited to play in any post-season tournament. This season marked the first time since 1970 that Indiana finished with a losing record, and the first time since 1985 that they failed to make the NCAA tournament.

== 2003–04 roster ==
No.	Name	Position	Ht.	Year	Hometown
2	A. J. Moye	G/F	6–3	Sr.	Atlanta
3	Patrick Ewing Jr.	F	6–8	Fr.	Marietta, Georgia
4	Bracey Wright	G	6–3	So.	The Colony, Texas
5	George Leach	C	6–11	Sr.	Charlotte, North Carolina
10	Roderick Wilmont	G	6–4	Fr.	Miramar, Florida
11	Errek Suhr	G	5–8	Fr.	Bloomington, Indiana
12	Donald Perry	G	6–2	Jr.	Tallulah, Louisiana
21	Mark Johnson	G	6–2	Jr.	Oregon, Wisconsin
22	Marshall Strickland	G	6–2	So.	Mount Airy, Maryland
23	Sean Kline	F	6–8	So.	Huntington, Indiana
33	Mike Roberts	F	6–9	Jr.	Eugene, Oregon
34	Ryan Tapak	G	6–2	Jr.	Indianapolis, Indiana
40	Jason Stewart	F	6–8	Sr.	Edwardsport, Indiana
44	Jessan Gray-Ashley	F/C	6–10	Fr.	Davenport, Iowa

== Schedule and results ==
Date time, TV	Rank^{#}	Opponent^{#}	Result	Record	Site city, state
Non-conference regular season
11/21/2003*		UNC Greensboro	W 71–64	1–0	Assembly Hall; Bloomington, Indiana
11/24/2003*		at Vanderbilt	L 60–73	1–1	Memorial Gymnasium; Nashville, Tennessee
11/29/2003*		vs. Xavier	W 80–77	2–1	Conseco Fieldhouse; Indianapolis
12/2/2003*		at No. 18 Wake Forest; ACC – Big Ten Challenge	L 67–100	2–2	LJV Coliseum; Winston-Salem, North Carolina
12/6/2003*		Missouri	L 58–63	2–3	Assembly Hall; Bloomington, Indiana
12/10/2003*		at Notre Dame	W 66–63	3–3	Joyce Center; Notre Dame, Indiana
12/13/2003*		Butler	W 62–50	4–3	Assembly Hall; Bloomington, Indiana
12/20/2003*; CBS		vs. No. 2 Kentucky; Indiana–Kentucky rivalry	L 41–80	4–4	RCA Dome; Indianapolis
12/23/2003*		Morehead State	W 77–57	5–4	Assembly Hall; Bloomington, Indiana
12/29/2003*		at North Texas	W 79–70	6–4	UNT Coliseum; Denton, Texas
1/3/2004*		Temple	L 50–59	6–5	Assembly Hall; Bloomington, Indiana
Big Ten regular season
1/6/2004		at No. 21 Wisconsin	L 45–79	6–6 (0–1)	Kohl Center; Madison, Wisconsin
1/11/2004; CBS		at Michigan	W 59–57	7–6 (1–1)	Crisler Arena; Ann Arbor, Michigan
1/17/2004		Northwestern	W 73–62	8–6 (2–1)	Assembly Hall; Bloomington, Indiana
1/20/2004		at Ohio State	W 69–61	9–6 (3–1)	Value City Arena; Columbus, Ohio
1/24/2004		at Minnesota	W 86–81	10–6 (4–1)	Williams Arena; Minneapolis
1/27/2004		Purdue; Rivalry/Crimson and Gold Cup	W 63–58	11–6 (5–1)	Assembly Hall; Bloomington, Indiana
1/31/2004		at Michigan State	L 72–84	11–7 (5–2)	Breslin Center; East Lansing, Michigan
2/3/2004		Illinois; Rivalry	L 49–51	11–8 (5–3)	Assembly Hall; Bloomington, Indiana
2/7/2004		Iowa	L 82–84	11–9 (5–4)	Assembly Hall; Bloomington, Indiana
2/11/2004		at Penn State	W 75–56	12–9 (6–4)	Bryce Jordan Center; University Park, Pennsylvania
2/14/2004		at Purdue; Rivalry/Crimson and Gold Cup	L 56–71	12–10 (6–5)	Mackey Arena; West Lafayette, Indiana
2/18/2004		Minnesota	L 71–73	12–11 (6–6)	Assembly Hall; Bloomington, Indiana
2/21/2004		Ohio State	L 56–59	12–12 (6–7)	Assembly Hall; Bloomington, Indiana
2/25/2004		at Northwestern	L 59–63	12–13 (6–8)	Welsh-Ryan Arena; Evanston, Illinois
3/3/2004		Michigan	W 61–56	13–13 (7–8)	Assembly Hall; Bloomington, Indiana
3/6/2004		No. 17 Wisconsin	L 52–70	13–14 (7–9)	Assembly Hall; Bloomington, Indiana
Big Ten tournament
3/11/2004		vs. Ohio State; Opening Round	W 83–69	14–14 (7–9)	Conseco Fieldhouse; Indianapolis
3/12/2004		vs. No. 12 Illinois; Quarterfinals	L 59–71	14–15 (7–9)	Conseco Fieldhouse; Indianapolis
*Non-conference game. ^{#}Rankings from AP Poll. (#) Tournament seedings in parentheses.
