= 2003–04 Illinois Fighting Illini men's basketball team =

American college basketball season

2003–04 Illinois Fighting Illini men's basketball

Big Ten Regular Season champions

NCAA tournament, Sweet Sixteen
- Conference: Big Ten Conference

Ranking
- Coaches: No. 11
- AP: No. 13
- Record: 26–7 (13–3 Big Ten)
- Head coach: Bruce Weber (1st season)
- Assistant coaches: Wayne McClain (3rd season); Jay Price (1st season); Chris Lowery (1st season)
- MVP: Deron Williams
- Captains: Dee Brown; Jerrance Howard; Deron Williams
- Home arena: Assembly Hall

2003–04 Big Ten Conference men's basketball standings
	Conf.				Overall
Team	W		L	PCT	W		L	PCT
No. 13 Illinois	13	–	3	.813	26	–	7	.788
No. 10 Wisconsin †	12	–	4	.750	25	–	7	.781
Michigan State	12	–	4	.750	18	–	12	.600
Iowa	9	–	7	.563	16	–	13	.552
Michigan	8	–	8	.500	23	–	11	.676
Northwestern	8	–	8	.500	14	–	15	.483
Purdue	7	–	9	.438	17	–	14	.548
Indiana	7	–	9	.438	14	–	15	.483
Ohio State	6	–	10	.375	14	–	16	.467
Minnesota	3	–	13	.188	12	–	18	.400
Penn State	3	–	13	.188	9	–	19	.321
† 2004 Big Ten tournament winner Rankings from AP poll

The 2003–04 Illinois Fighting Illini men's basketball team represented 98th season University of Illinois at Urbana-Champaign in the 2003-04 NCAA Division I men's basketball season. This was head coach Bruce Weber's first season at Illinois.

== Season ==
Bill Self left the Fighting Illini in March, 2003 to take over as coach at Kansas, paving the way for Bruce Weber to be named the 16th Illinois head coach on April 30, 2003. Weber arrived in Champaign after directing the Southern Illinois Salukis for five seasons. Weber’s inaugural season directing the Orange and Blue was a success, as he became just the third coach in Big Ten history to win an outright conference championship in his first season. The Illini had to win its final 10 games of the regular season to clinch sole possession of the title, with six of those wins coming away from the Assembly Hall. Weber also guided Illinois to its first NCAA Tournament victory over a higher seeded team, when the No. 5 Illini defeated No. 4 Cincinnati in the second round of the tournament. The Illini finished the year with a record of 26–7 and advanced to the NCAA Sweet Sixteen.

== Roster ==
2003–04 Illinois Fighting Illini men's basketball team
Players
Coaches

Pos.	#	Name	Height	Weight	Year	Previous school	Hometown
F/C	1	Aaron Spears	6 ft 9 in (2.06 m)	250 lb (113 kg)	Fr	Dunbar High School	Chicago, IL
G	4	Luther Head	6 ft 3 in (1.91 m)	175 lb (79 kg)	Jr	Manley High School	Chicago, IL
G	5	Deron Williams (C)	6 ft 3 in (1.91 m)	210 lb (95 kg)	So	The Colony High School	The Colony, TX
G	11	Dee Brown (C)	6 ft 0 in (1.83 m)	175 lb (79 kg)	So	Proviso East High School	Maywood, IL
G	25	Jerrance Howard (C)	6 ft 1 in (1.85 m)	200 lb (91 kg)	RS Sr	Peoria High School	Peoria, IL
G	33	Rich McBride	6 ft 3 in (1.91 m)	210 lb (95 kg)	Fr	Lanphier High School	Springfield, IL
F	34	Fred Nkemdi (W)	6 ft 6 in (1.98 m)	220 lb (100 kg)	Jr	Riverside Brookfield High School/Morton Junior College	North Riverside, IL
F	40	James Augustine	6 ft 10 in (2.08 m)	220 lb (100 kg)	So	Lincoln-Way Central High School	Mokena, IL
F	41	Warren Carter	6 ft 9 in (2.06 m)	205 lb (93 kg)	Fr	Lake Highlands High School	Dallas, TX
F	42	Brian Randle	6 ft 8 in (2.03 m)	200 lb (91 kg)	Fr	Peoria Notre Dame High School	East Peoria, IL
F	43	Roger Powell	6 ft 6 in (1.98 m)	220 lb (100 kg)	Jr	Joliet Central High School	Joliet, IL
C	45	Nick Smith	7 ft 2 in (2.18 m)	240 lb (109 kg)	RS Jr	Bloomingdale High School	Valrico, FL
F/C	50	Jack Ingram	6 ft 10 in (2.08 m)	245 lb (111 kg)	RS Jr	Marshall High School/University of Tulsa	San Antonio, TX

Head coach

- Bruce Weber (Wisconsin-Milwaukee)

Assistant coach(es)

- Wayne McClain (Illinois State)
- Jay Price (Kansas)
- Chris Lowery (Southern Illinois)

Legend

- (C) Team captain
- (S) Suspended
- (I) Ineligible
- (W) Walk-on
- Injured
- Current redshirt

Roster

== Schedule ==
Date time, TV	Rank^{#}	Opponent^{#}	Result	Record	Site (attendance) city, state
Exhibition
Sun, Nov 9, 2003*; 4:00 pm	No. 12	Illinois All-Stars	W 91–66		Assembly Hall (14,325); Champaign, IL
Mon, Nov 17, 2003*; 7:00 pm	No. 12	Spot-Lite Jammers	W 83–63		Assembly Hall (14,151); Champaign, IL
Non-Conference regular season
Sat, Nov 22, 2003*; 7:00 pm	No. 12	Western Illinois	W 94–66	1–0	Assembly Hall (15,591); Champaign, IL
Wed, Nov 26, 2003*; 7:00 pm	No. 12	Mercer	W 93–61	2–0	Assembly Hall (13,742); Champaign, IL
Sat, Nov 29, 2003*; 4:00 pm, ESPN2	No. 12	at Temple	W 75–60	3–0	The Palestra (6,194); Philadelphia, PA
Tue, Dec 2, 2003*; 9:00 pm, ESPN	No. 11	vs. No. 10 North Carolina	L 81–88	3–1	Greensboro Coliseum (16,211); Greensboro, NC
Sat, Dec 6, 2003*; 11:00 am, ESPN Plus	No. 11	vs. Arkansas	W 84–61	4–1	United Center (15,398); Chicago, IL
Tue, Dec 9, 2003*; 6:00 pm, ESPN	No. 14	vs. Providence; Jimmy V Classic	L 51–70	4–2	Madison Square Garden (7,665); New York, NY
Thu, Dec 11, 2003*; 7:00 pm	No. 14	Maryland-Eastern Shore	W 85–43	5–2	Assembly Hall (14,751); Champaign, IL
Sat, Dec 13, 2003*; 8:00 pm, ESPN2	No. 14	Memphis	W 74–64	6–2	Assembly Hall (16,618); Champaign, IL
Tue, Dec 23, 2003*; 8:00 pm, ESPN2	No. 21	vs. No. 11 Missouri; Braggin' Rights	W 71–70	7–2	Savvis Center (22,153); St. Louis, MO
Tue, Dec 30, 2003*; 7:00 pm, WBBM	No. 20	vs. Illinois-Chicago	W 75–60	8–2	United Center (15,415); Chicago, IL
Sat, Jan 3, 2004*; 1:00 pm, ESPN Plus	No. 20	Illinois State	W 80–73	9–2	Assembly Hall (16,618); Champaign, IL
Big Ten regular season
Wed, Jan 7, 2004; 8:00 pm, ESPN Plus	No. 19	Ohio State	W 85–63	10–2 (1–0)	Assembly Hall (15,659); Champaign, IL
Sat, Jan 10, 2004; 3:30 pm, ESPN Plus	No. 19	No. 24 Purdue	L 54–58	10–3 (1–1)	Assembly Hall (16,618); Champaign, IL
Wed, Jan 14, 2004; 7:00 pm, ESPN Plus	No. 25	at Northwestern; Rivalry	L 60–70	10–4 (1–2)	Welsh-Ryan Arena (8,117); Evanston, IL
Sat, Jan 17, 2004; 11:00 am, ESPN	No. 25	Iowa; Rivalry	W 88–82	11–4 (2–2)	Assembly Hall (16,618); Champaign, IL
Wed, Jan 21, 2004; 8:00 pm, ESPN Plus		Penn State	W 80–37	12–4 (3–2)	Assembly Hall (16,248); Champaign, IL
Sat, Jan 24, 2004; 1:35 pm, ESPN Plus		at No. 21 Wisconsin	L 56–76	12–5 (3–3)	Kohl Center (17,142); Madison, WI
Sat, Jan 31, 2004; 12:39 pm, CBS		Michigan	W 67–52	13–5 (4–3)	Assembly Hall (16,618); Champaign, IL
Tue, Feb 3, 2004; 7:00 pm, ESPN		at Indiana; Rivalry	W 51–49	14–5 (5–3)	Assembly Hall (17,306); Bloomington, IN
Sun, Feb 8, 2004; 12:00 pm, CBS		at Minnesota	W 79–69	15–5 (6–3)	Williams Arena (13,404); Minneapolis, MN
Tue, Feb 10, 2004; 8:00 pm, ESPN		Michigan State	W 75–51	16–5 (7–3)	Assembly Hall (16,618); Champaign, IL
Wed, Feb 18, 2004; 7:00 pm, ESPN Plus		No. 12 Wisconsin	W 65–57	17–5 (8–3)	Assembly Hall (16,618); Champaign, IL
Sat, Feb 21, 2004; 4:00 pm, ESPN		at Penn State	W 66–58	18–5 (9–3)	Bryce Jordan Center (10,008); University Park, PA
Wed, Feb 25, 2004; 6:05 pm, ESPN Plus	No. 23	at Iowa; Rivalry	W 78–59	19–5 (10–3)	Carver–Hawkeye Arena (14,493); Iowa City, IA
Sat, Feb 28, 2004; 1:30 pm, ESPN Plus	No. 23	Northwestern; Rivalry	W 66–56	20–5 (11–3)	Assembly Hall (16,618); Champaign, IL
Wed, Mar 3, 2004; 7:00 pm, ESPN Plus	No. 18	at Purdue	W 81–79 ^{OT}	21–5 (12–3)	Mackey Arena (13,740); West Lafayette, IN
Sun, Mar 7, 2004; 4:05 pm, CBS	No. 18	at Ohio State	W 64–63	22–5 (13–3)	Value City Arena (16,445); Columbus, OH
Big Ten tournament
Fri, Mar 12, 2004; 12:00 pm, ESPN	(1) No. 12	vs. (8) Indiana; Quarterfinals	W 71–59	23–5	Conseco Fieldhouse (N/A); Indianapolis, IN
Sat, Mar 13, 2004; 12:40 pm, CBS	(1) No. 12	vs. (5) Michigan; Semifinals	W 74–60	24–5	Conseco Fieldhouse (N/A); Indianapolis, IN
Sun, Mar 14, 2004; 2:40 pm, CBS	(1) No. 12	vs. (2) No. 10 Wisconsin; Championship	L 53–70	24–6	Conseco Fieldhouse (14,617); Indianapolis, IN
NCAA tournament
Fri, Mar 19, 2004*; 11:25 am, CBS	(5 A) No. 13	vs. (12 A) Murray State; First round	W 72–53	25–6	Nationwide Arena (19,588); Columbus, OH
Sun, Mar 21, 2004*; 1:30 pm, CBS	(5 A) No. 13	vs. (4 A) No. 11 Cincinnati; Second round	W 92–68	26–6	Nationwide Arena (19,588); Columbus, OH
Fri, Mar 26, 2004*; 10:16 pm, CBS	(5 A) No. 13	vs. (1 A) No. 6 Duke; Sweet Sixteen	L 62–72	26–7	Georgia Dome (24,533); Atlanta, GA
*Non-conference game. ^{#}Rankings from AP Poll. (#) Tournament seedings in parentheses. All times are in Central Time.

== Season Statistics ==
Legend
GP	Games played	GS	Games started	Avg	Average per game
FG	Field-goals made	FGA	Field-goal attempts	Off	Offensive rebounds
Def	Defensive rebounds	A	Assists	TO	Turnovers
Blk	Blocks	Stl	Steals	High	Team high

Individual Player Statistics
			Minutes		Scoring		Total FGs			3-point FGs			Free-Throws			Rebounds							
Player	GP	GS	Tot	Avg	Pts	Avg	FG	FGA	Pct	3FG	3FA	Pct	FT	FTA	Pct	Off	Def	Tot	Avg	A	TO	Blk	Stl
Brown, Dee	33	33	1153	34.9	440	13.3	160	389	.411	71	205	.346	49	73	.671	34	89	123	3.7	147	65	3	51
Williams, Deron	30	29	1017	33.9	420	14.0	147	360	.408	67	170	.394	59	75	.787	14	83	97	3.2	185	75	9	31
Powell, Roger	32	31	856	26.8	371	11.6	150	252	.595	4	12	.333	67	105	.638	75	85	160	5.0	22	40	14	21
Head, Luther	29	24	863	29.8	319	11.0	107	239	.448	49	143	.343	56	72	.778	25	85	110	3.8	75	45	6	30
Augustine, James	33	33	904	27.4	318	9.6	125	197	.635	0	2	.000	68	106	.642	93	149	242	7.3	21	41	42	38
Smith, Nick	33	6	552	16.7	223	6.8	81	178	.455	8	26	.308	53	66	.803	38	69	107	3.2	38	49	24	8
McBride, Rich	29	0	411	14.2	92	3.2	30	99	.303	24	74	.324	8	10	.800	16	20	36	1.2	31	13	0	14
Randle, Brian	32	9	354	11.1	86	2.7	35	62	.565	3	12	.250	13	28	.464	24	49	73	2.3	16	26	11	15
Ingram, Jack	33	0	293	8.9	73	2.2	32	75	.427	1	7	.143	8	12	.667	31	42	73	2.2	14	11	9	7
Spears, Aaron	20	0	97	4.9	21	1.1	9	19	.474	0	0	.000	3	8	.375	2	9	11	0.6	2	10	2	3
Carter, Warren	17	0	63	3.7	20	1.2	6	15	.400	0	0	.000	8	10	.800	1	9	10	0.6	5	4	1	1
Howard, Jerrance	18	0	78	4.3	19	1.1	5	14	.357	4	11	.364	5	6	.833	1	7	8	0.4	9	9	1	5
Nkemdi, Fred	6	0	9	1.5	0	0.0	0	0	.000	0	0	.000	0	0	.000	0	3	3	0.5	0	0	0	0
Team																39	58	97			13		
Total	33		6650		2402	72.8	887	1899	.467	231	662	.349	397	571	.695	393	757	1150	34.8	565	401	122	224
Opponents	33		6650		2077	62.9	733	1750	.419	183	540	.339	428	627	.683	372	692	1064	32.2	405	474	112	197

== Awards and honors ==
- Dee Brown
  - Associated Press Honorable Mention All-American
- Deron Williams
  - Team Most Valuable Player

== Team players drafted into the NBA ==
Player	NBA Club	Round	Pick
