= 2003–04 Murray State Racers men's basketball team =

American college basketball season

2003–04 Murray State Racers men's basketball
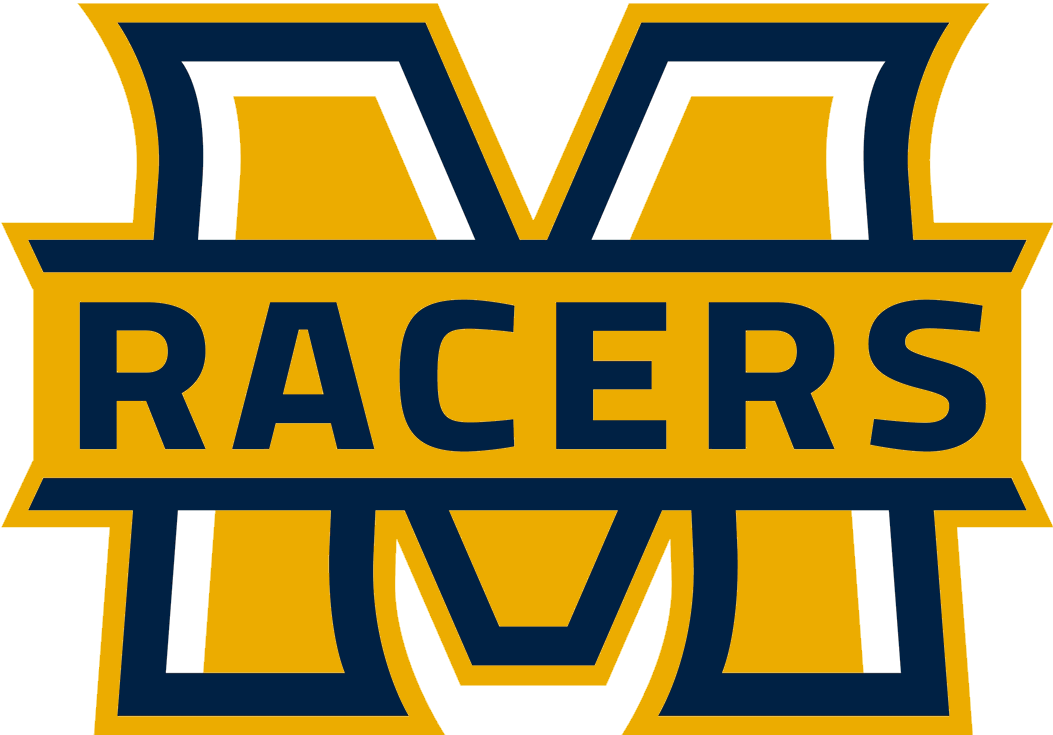

Ohio Valley tournament champions

NCAA tournament, first round
- Conference: Ohio Valley Conference
- Record: 28–6 (14–2 OVC)
- Head coach: Mick Cronin (1st season)
- Home arena: Regional Special Events Center

2003–04 Ohio Valley Conference men's basketball standings
	Conf.				Overall
Team	W		L	PCT	W		L	PCT
Austin Peay	16	–	0	1.000	22	–	10	.688
Murray State †	14	–	2	.875	28	–	6	.824
Morehead State	10	–	6	.625	16	–	13	.552
Eastern Kentucky	8	–	8	.500	14	–	15	.483
Samford	7	–	9	.438	12	–	16	.429
Jacksonville State	7	–	9	.438	14	–	14	.500
Tennessee Tech	7	–	9	.438	13	–	15	.464
Tennessee State	6	–	10	.375	7	–	21	.250
UT Martin	5	–	11	.313	10	–	18	.357
Eastern Illinois	4	–	12	.250	6	–	21	.222
Southeast Missouri State	4	–	12	.250	11	–	16	.407
† 2004 OVC tournament winner Rankings from AP Poll

The 2003–04 Murray State Racers men's basketball team represented Murray State University during the 2003–04 NCAA Division I men's basketball season. The Racers, led by first-year head coach Mick Cronin, played their home games at Racer Arena in Murray, Kentucky, as members of the Ohio Valley Conference. They finished the season 28–6, 14–2 in OVC play to win the OVC regular season title. They defeated Austin Peay to win the OVC tournament to advance to the NCAA tournament. As No. 12 seed in the South region, the Racers were beaten by No. 5 seed Illinois, 72–53.

== Roster ==
2004–05 Murray State Racers men's basketball team
Players	Coaches
Pos. / # / Name / Height / Weight / Year / Hometown; F / 10 / Cuthbert Victor / 6 ft 5 in (1.96 m) / 215 lb (98 kg) / Sr / Saint Croix, U.S. Virgin Islands	Head coach: Mick Cronin (Cincinnati); Assistant coach(es) Legend: (C) Team captain; (S) Suspended; (I) Ineligible; (W) Walk-on; Injured; Current redshirt

== Schedule and results ==
Date time, TV	Rank^{#}	Opponent^{#}	Result	Record	Site (attendance) city, state
Regular season
Dec 17, 2003*		Southern Illinois	W 68–64	8–0	Regional Special Events Center (6,422); Murray, Kentucky
Dec 20, 2003*		at No. 18 Pittsburgh	L 49–70	8–1	Petersen Events Center (9,112); Pittsburgh, Pennsylvania
Jan 3, 2004*		at No. 11 Louisville	L 69–91	10–2	Freedom Hall (19,292); Louisville, Kentucky
Ohio Valley Conference tournament
Mar 2, 2004*		Tennessee Tech; Quarterfinals	W 92–75	26–5	Regional Special Events Center (3,813); Murray, Kentucky
Mar 5, 2004*		vs. Morehead State; Semifinals	W 94–72	27–5	Nashville Municipal Auditorium (3,216); Nashville, Tennessee
Mar 6, 2004*		vs. Austin Peay; Championship game	W 66–60	28–5	Nashville Municipal Auditorium (4,851); Nashville, Tennessee
NCAA tournament
Mar 19, 2004*	(12 S)	vs. (5 S) No. 13 Illinois; First round	L 53–72	28–6	Nationwide Arena (19,588); Columbus, Ohio
*Non-conference game. ^{#}Rankings from AP Poll. (#) Tournament seedings in parentheses. S=South. All times are in Central Time.

== Awards and honors ==
- Cuthbert Victor – OVC Player of the Year
