= 2004 Ohio Valley Conference men's basketball tournament =

- Classification: Division I
- Season: 2003–04
- Teams: 8
- First round site: Campus Sites
- Semifinals site: Nashville Municipal Auditorium; Nashville, Tennessee
- Finals site: Nashville Municipal Auditorium; Nashville, Tennessee
- Champions: Murray State (12th title)
- Winning coach: Mick Cronin (1st title)
- MVP: Cuthbert Victor (Murray State)

2003–04 Ohio Valley Conference men's basketball standings
	Conf.				Overall
Team	W		L	PCT	W		L	PCT
Austin Peay	16	–	0	1.000	22	–	10	.688
Murray State †	14	–	2	.875	28	–	6	.824
Morehead State	10	–	6	.625	16	–	13	.552
Eastern Kentucky	8	–	8	.500	14	–	15	.483
Samford	7	–	9	.438	12	–	16	.429
Jacksonville State	7	–	9	.438	14	–	14	.500
Tennessee Tech	7	–	9	.438	13	–	15	.464
Tennessee State	6	–	10	.375	7	–	21	.250
UT Martin	5	–	11	.313	10	–	18	.357
Eastern Illinois	4	–	12	.250	6	–	21	.222
Southeast Missouri State	4	–	12	.250	11	–	16	.407
† 2004 OVC tournament winner Rankings from AP Poll

The 2004 Ohio Valley Conference men's basketball tournament was the postseason men's basketball tournament of the Ohio Valley Conference during the 2003–04 NCAA Division I men's basketball season. It was held March 2–6, 2004. The first round was hosted by the higher seeded team in each game. The semifinals and finals took place at Nashville Municipal Auditorium in Nashville, Tennessee.

Second-seeded Murray State won the tournament, defeating Austin Peay in the championship game, and received the Ohio Valley's automatic bid to the NCAA tournament. Cuthbert Victor of Murray State was named the tournament's most valuable player.

== Format ==
The top eight eligible men's basketball teams in the Ohio Valley Conference receive a berth in the conference tournament. After the regular season, teams were seeded by conference record.

== Bracket ==
Quarterfinals; March 2
1	Austin Peay	75
8	Tennessee State	70
4	Eastern Kentucky	81
5	Samford	61
3	Morehead State	83
6	Jacksonville State	68
2	Murray State	92
7	Tennessee Tech	75

Semifinals; March 5
1	Austin Peay	62
4	Eastern Kentucky	57
3	Morehead State	72
2	Murray State	94

Finals; March 6
1	Austin Peay	60
2	Murray State	66
