= Basketbowl =

| Kentucky Wildcats | Michigan State Spartans |
| (4–0) | (3–3) |
|---|---|
| 79 | 74 |
| Head coach: Tubby Smith | Head coach: Tom Izzo |
| | 1st half | 2nd half | Total |
|---|---|---|---|
| Kentucky Wildcats | 49 | 30 | 79 |
| Michigan State Spartans | 43 | 31 | 74 |
- Date: December 13, 2003
- Venue: Ford Field, Detroit
- Attendance: 78,129
- Network: CBS
- Announcers: Verne Lundquist and Billy Packer

The Basketbowl was a college basketball game between Michigan State University and the University of Kentucky held on December 13, 2003, at Ford Field, a domed American football stadium in Detroit, Michigan. Kentucky won the game 79–74, never trailing throughout the contest.

The announced crowd of 78,129 set a record for verified attendance at a basketball game in history. While the record was broken at the 2010 NBA All-Star Game, which drew 108,713 to Cowboys Stadium in Arlington, Texas, the Basketbowl still holds the record for attendance at a college basketball game.

== Teams ==
Both schools entered into the contest with significant on-court accomplishments. Combined, both schools had won nine national championships (seven for Kentucky, two for Michigan State) and made 18 Final Four appearances (13 for Kentucky, five for Michigan State). Michigan State and Kentucky had met 20 times previously with Kentucky holding an 11–9 advantage. Michigan State had defeated Kentucky 71–67 the previous year at Rupp Arena.

== Court ==
The court being assembled in Ford Field.

The basketball court for the game was moved from Michigan State's Breslin Center and reassembled on the 50 yard line of Ford Field, giving the promotional title "Basketbowl: Hoops on the 50!" This is the same court that Michigan State won the 2000 NCAA Championship on in Indianapolis. In addition, the entire court was raised off the field by a custom stage deck installed by SGA Production Staging, Inc. to improve sight lines for those sitting in the upper bowl of the stadium.

== Basketball attendance record ==
The previous record of 75,000 was held by the Harlem Globetrotters during their exhibition game at Berlin, Germany's Olympic Stadium. The 2010 NBA All-Star Game at Cowboys Stadium drew a crowd of 108,713, which shattered the all-time attendance record for the sport set by Michigan State and Kentucky in 2003.

== "BasketBowl II" ==
It was announced on April 15, 2008 that Ford Field would host "BasketBowl II" between the Spartans and North Carolina as part of the ACC–Big Ten Challenge on December 3 of that year. North Carolina won the game easily 98–63. The game was televised on ESPN. The two teams met again in Ford Field four months later, this time for the 2009 NCAA Tournament Championship. North Carolina easily defeated the Spartans in the championship as well.
