= Lester Abram =

American basketball player

Personal information
- Born: September 2, 1983 (age 43)
- Listed height: 6 ft 6 in (1.98 m)
- Listed weight: 200 lb (91 kg)

Career information
- High school: Pontiac Northern (Pontiac, Michigan)
- College: Michigan (2002–2007)
- Position: Guard

Career highlights
- Third-team All-Big Ten (2004); Michigan Wolverines' Bill Buntin MVP award (2004)

Lester C. Abram, Jr. (born September 2, 1983) is an American former college basketball player for the Michigan Wolverines.

As a senior, Abram was the first player in program history to be selected as a captain in three separate seasons. He played in 120 career games, tied for No. 18 all-time, and started 106 games, tied for 10th all-time. Abram played 3,513 career minutes (No. 12 all-time), scored 1,274 career points (No. 26 all-time), shot 82.93 percent on career free throws (No. 2 all-time), and had 345 free throws made (No. 10 all-time). He also set freshman (85.6 percent) and sophomore (84.3 percent) program records for free throw percentage in a season.

== High school career ==
Born in Pontiac, Michigan, Abram played for Pontiac Northern High School and was coached by Robert Rogers. In his prep career, he averaged 19.0 points per game and came in third for the 2002 Hal Schram Mr. Basketball award. Abram led Pontiac Northern to back-to-back Class A state titles and missed only one career game (finishing with an 81–21 career record). Additionally, he was a four-year starter and a two-year captain, playing four different positions. During his freshman year (1999), he averaged 14.1 points and led Pontiac Northern to the Michigan Class A State semifinal game; he also played for an AAU team, and was coached by Durand Walker. As a sophomore (2000), he averaged 14.1 points and led Pontiac Northern to a 17–5 record. As a junior (in 2001), he averaged 20.2 points, 10.3 rebounds and 3.8 assists and led Pontiac Northern to the Class A State Championship title. His senior year (in 2002), he averaged 22.7 points, 10.8 rebounds, 4.7 assists, 1.8 steals and 1.5 blocks. Abram led Pontiac Northern to a 23–4 record and the Class A State title, where he earned co-Most Valuable Player honors.

In 2000, Abram made the Detroit News Class A All-State as an honorable mention, All-Metro honorable mention, All-North second team (2000), Detroit Free Press Class A All-State honorable mention (2000), and USA Today's Michigan “Players to Watch” (2000).

Moreover, he was selected as a member of the following teams:

- Top 100 selection for the McDonald's All-American Team
- Detroit News Dream Team
- All-Metro first team
- All-North first team (2002)
- Detroit Free Press Dream Team
- All-Metro first team (for which he was selected as the captain)
- All-North first team (where again, he was named captain) (2002)
- Oakland Press Oakland County Dream Team (2002)
- Associated Press Class A All-State first team (2001)

== University of Michigan career ==
=== Freshman (2002–03) ===
Abram enrolled at the University of Michigan in 2002. As a freshman, he won U-M's 2003 Iron Man Award and U-M's 2003 Award for Outstanding Free Throw Shooting. He played in all 30 games (with 28 starts). Following an 0–6 start, he helped U-M to a 13-game winning streak and third place in the Big Ten. He helped his team win at UCLA's Pauley Pavilion (81–76) December 28, 2002. Next, Lester helped U-M break an eight-game losing streak against Michigan State on January 26, 2003. His first collegiate game and start was against St. Bonaventure at the Paradise Jam tournament on November 23, where he had 11 points, 3 rebounds and one block. Abram set U-M's freshman record shooting 85.6 percent on free throws (89-for-104).

During one 18-game stretch, he never missed a shot from the free throw line. He averaged 10.6 points per game (319 points total) and scored in double figures in 16 games. He had one game scoring 20 or more points, with a season-high 20 points against IUPUI on January 4, 2003. Abram was the highest scorer in six games. In all, he averaged 4.4 rebounds per game (131 total). His season-high nine rebounds was in a game against Iowa on (February 8, 2003). He played 32.1 minutes per game.

=== Sophomore (2003–04) ===
Abram was a member of the 2004 NIT Championship team and 2004 All-Big Ten third team. He won U-M's 2004 Bill Buntin Most Valuable Player Award, U-M's 2004 Travis Conlan Sportsmanship Award, U-M's 2004 Award for Outstanding Free Throw Shooting, U-M's 2004 Iron Man Award, and CBS Player of the Game against Wisconsin on February 22, 2004. His next honors were ESPN2 Player of the Game and Four-time ESPN-Plus Player of the Game. He missed three games after suffering a left shoulder injury in a collision with Iowa's Greg Brunner in the Big Ten tournament. Abram came back with 17 points, five rebounds, and two steals in a game against Hawaii on March 24, 2004. This injury caused Abram to snap a streak of playing in 58 consecutive games.

Abram lead his team in scoring 12 games. On January 27, 2004, vs. Northwestern, he scored a career-high 27 points. Abram tied UM All-American Cazzie Russell for U-M sophomore shooting record 84.3% on free throws (113-for-134); moreover, he twice successfully made 10 free throws. He was perfect from the free throw line in 13 games and averaged 4.2 rebounds per game (131 in all). Abram next had a career high of 10 rebounds against Iowa State on February 14, 2004. He led the UOM in rebounding for six games. This rewarded him 13 points and 10 rebounds. Total, Abram had 41 assists, nine blocks, and 31 steals; he played 29.5 minutes per game.

=== Junior (2004–05) ===
Abram was voted this season one of three team captains. Abram missed 28 total games of the 2004–05 season following surgery to left shoulder on December 16, 2004. Abram played in three games averaging 6.7 points (20 total) and 4.7 rebounds (14 total) in 28.7 minutes. And Shooting 90.9 percent (10-for-11) on free throws.

=== Senior (2005–06) ===
Abram helped Michigan to its first inclusion in the top 25 of the AP poll in eight years. He also led them to back-to-back wins over top 25 teams for the first time since 1994. Honorably, he was voted as one of four team captains. Abram was the ESPN Plus Player of the Game (U-M) against Northwestern on January 18. He started 18 of 21 games; however, he missed two games with sprained right toe and 10 games with severely sprained left ankle. His return was in the first round of the Big Ten tournament vs. Minnesota (March 9). He played thirteen minutes, received two points, three rebounds, two resists, and a block. His averages were 10.0 points, 3.3 rebounds, 1.0 assists and 1.0 steals per game. In 12 of the 21 games that featured him, he scored double figures. His career best from the field was 53% (71 for 134) and he made 42.5 percent of his three-pointers (17-for-40); he made 82.5%(52-for-63) of his free throws. He gained 22 assists, five blocks, and 21 steals. In the game against Northwestern on January 18, he scored a season best 20 points after going 9-for-12 from the field and 2-for-5 on three-pointers. Abram had a career-high four steals and finished with 14 points after going 8-for-10 from the free throw line in win over Miami, Florida (Nov. 29) in the Big Ten/ACC Challenge.

He hit two free throw shots within 1.9 rebounds to seal the win at Notre Dame on December 3 and finished the game off with four points, 1 block, and two steals. He followed up with a career-high five assists against Coppin State (December 28). Next, he went 10-for-10 from the free-throw line in Miami, Florida Game on March 22 in the quarterfinal of the NIT. He was featured in a game against Central Michigan on November 18. He sat out his junior season (2004–05) because of an injury and finished with 19 points after going 7-for-10 from the field.

Big Ten Foreign Touring Team (2006) Abram also entered with Big Ten Foreign Touring team on a four-game exhibition throughout Sydney and Brisbane, Australia. Plus, he helped the Big Ten team to 3–1 record. The Big Ten team set a record for most points in an exhibition game with (145) against the South District Spartans. He played in four games with two starts averaged 15.3 points, 4.0 rebounds and 1.3 assists. And led the Touring team in scoring with 18 points against the Sydney Kings and 22 points against the South District Spartans, where he was perfect from the field.

=== 5th year senior (2006–07) ===
Appliying for and earning a medical hardship by the NCAA granting him an extra year of eligibility for his injury as a junior, he endeavored into becoming the first three-time captain in Michigan history. He helped Michigan to the Postseason NIT second round. He helped them to a 22–13 record; their second straight 20-plus win season. Abram averaged 9.1 points, 3.8 rebounds, 2.1 assists and 0.9 steals per game. He scored double-figures in 16 games, with one game of 20 or more points. He then achieved the ESPN Plus Player of the Game vs. Illinois on January 3 with 25 points on 9-for-13 shooting with seven rebounds, three assists and two blocks. Twenty-five points was also a season high; he was also 6-for-6 on free throws. Next, he would score a 1,000th career point through a three-point field goal in the first half against Youngstown State (Nov. 22), making him the 42nd Wolverine to reach 1,000 career points. Abram had a single season career-high 133 rebounds, a season-high seven rebounds, four times, had single season career-high 74 assists and had a career-high seven assists fighting Harvard on November 17. He also posted 31 steals and nine blocks with a career-high five steals against Harvard and a season-high two blocks against Illinois. He played in 28.6 minutes per game though recorded first 1,000 minute season (1,001) and played 20-or-more minutes in 32-of-35 games with 16 games of 30-or more minutes. He also received the University of Michigan's 2007 Steve Grote Hustle Award.

== Personal life ==
Abram is the son of Kim and Lester Abram. He was enrolled in Kinesiology, but chose sport management as his major. He is left handed and played with collegiate teammate Graham Brown on the AAU team, The Family, and played against collegiate teammate Dion Harris in the 2002 Class A State Championship game at Pontiac Northern. On February 19, 2007, he was arrested for driving with a suspended license in Ingham County.
