= 2003–04 Iowa Hawkeyes men's basketball team =

American college basketball season

2003–04 Iowa Hawkeyes men's basketball

National Invitation Tournament, First Round
- Conference: Big Ten Conference
- Record: 16–13 (9–7 Big Ten)
- Head coach: Steve Alford (5th season)
- Assistant coaches: Brian Jones; Greg Lansing
- MVPs: Jeff Horner; Pierre Pierce
- Home arena: Carver–Hawkeye Arena

2003–04 Big Ten Conference men's basketball standings
	Conf.				Overall
Team	W		L	PCT	W		L	PCT
No. 13 Illinois	13	–	3	.813	26	–	7	.788
No. 10 Wisconsin †	12	–	4	.750	25	–	7	.781
Michigan State	12	–	4	.750	18	–	12	.600
Iowa	9	–	7	.563	16	–	13	.552
Michigan	8	–	8	.500	23	–	11	.676
Northwestern	8	–	8	.500	14	–	15	.483
Purdue	7	–	9	.438	17	–	14	.548
Indiana	7	–	9	.438	14	–	15	.483
Ohio State	6	–	10	.375	14	–	16	.467
Minnesota	3	–	13	.188	12	–	18	.400
Penn State	3	–	13	.188	9	–	19	.321
† 2004 Big Ten tournament winner Rankings from AP poll

The 2003–04 Iowa Hawkeyes men's basketball team represented the University of Iowa as members of the Big Ten Conference during the 2003–04 NCAA Division I men's basketball season. The team was led by fifth-year head coach Steve Alford and played their home games at Carver–Hawkeye Arena. They finished the season 16–13 overall and 9–7 in Big Ten play.

== Roster ==
2003–04 Iowa Hawkeyes men's basketball team
Players
Coaches

Pos.	#	Name	Height	Weight	Year	Hometown
G	2	Jeff Horner	6 ft 3 in (1.91 m)	—	So	Mason City, Iowa
G	3	Pierre Pierce	6 ft 4 in (1.93 m)	—	So	Westmont, Illinois
F	4	Glen Worley	6 ft 7 in (2.01 m)	—	Sr	Coralville, Iowa
C	5	Jared Reiner	6 ft 11 in (2.11 m)	—	Sr	Tripp, South Dakota
G	11	Brody Boyd	5 ft 11 in (1.8 m)	—	Sr	Dugger, Indiana
F	13	Justin Wieck	6 ft 6 in (1.98 m)	—	So	North Liberty, Iowa
C	34	Erek Hansen	6 ft 11 in (2.11 m)	—	So	Bedford, Texas
G	35	Mike Henderson	6 ft 2 in (1.88 m)	—	Fr	Waterloo, Iowa
F	44	Greg Brunner	6 ft 7 in (2.01 m)	—	So	Charles City, Iowa
C	53	Sean Sonderleiter	6 ft 9 in (2.06 m)	—	Sr	Des Moines, Iowa

Head coach

- Steve Alford (Indiana)

Assistant coach(es)

- Brian Jones (Northern Iowa)
- Greg Lansing (South Dakota)
- Sam Alford

Legend

- (C) Team captain
- (S) Suspended
- (I) Ineligible
- (W) Walk-on
- Injured
- Current redshirt

== Schedule/Results ==
Date time, TV	Rank^{#}	Opponent^{#}	Result	Record	Site city, state
Non-conference regular season
Nov 23, 2003*		UNC Asheville	W 107–80	1–0	Carver-Hawkeye Arena; Iowa City, IA
11/25/2003*		Drake; Iowa Big Four	W 74-56	2-0	Carver-Hawkeye Arena; Iowa City, IA
11/29/2003*		vs. No. 17 Louisville	W 70-69 ^{OT}	3-0	Conseco Fieldhouse; Indianapolis, IN
Dec 2, 2003*		Green Bay	W 82–56	4–0	Carver-Hawkeye Arena; Iowa City, IA
Dec 5, 2003*		Eastern Washington; Gazette-Hawkeye Challenge	W 70–54	5–0	Carver-Hawkeye Arena; Iowa City, IA
Dec 6, 2003*	No. 24	Northern Illinois; Gazette-Hawkeye Challenge	W 65–57	6–0	Carver-Hawkeye Arena; Iowa City, IA
Dec 9, 2003*	No. 24	at Northern Iowa; Iowa Big Four	L 66–77	6–1	UNI-Dome; Cedar Falls, Iowa
Dec 22, 2003*		vs. Texas Tech	L 59–65	6–2	American Airlines Center; Dallas, TX
Dec 30, 2003*		Eastern Illinois	W 71–62	7–2	Carver-Hawkeye Arena; Iowa City, IA
Jan 3, 2004*		at No. 23 Missouri	L 56–76	7–3	Hearnes Center; Columbia, MO
Big Ten Regular Season
Jan 7, 2004		No. 24 Purdue	W 71–61	8–3 (1–0)	Carver-Hawkeye Arena; Iowa City, IA
Jan 10, 2004		Northwestern	L 68–77	8–4 (1–1)	Carver-Hawkeye Arena; Iowa City, IA
Jan 13, 2004		at Minnesota	W 83–68	9–4 (2–1)	Williams Arena; Minneapolis, MN
Jan 17, 2004		at No. 25 Illinois	L 82–88	9–5 (2–2)	Assembly Hall; Champaign, IL
1/21/2004*		at Iowa State; Rivalry	L 76-84	9-6	Hilton Coliseum; Ames, Iowa
Jan 24, 2004		Ohio State	W 79–65	10–6 (3–2)	Carver-Hawkeye Arena; Iowa City, IA
Jan 28, 2004		at Michigan	L 84–90	10–7 (3–3)	Crisler Arena; Ann Arbor, MI
Jan 31, 2004		Penn State	W 77–58	11–7 (4–3)	Carver-Hawkeye Arena; Iowa City, IA
Feb 4, 2004		at Michigan State	L 72–89	11–8 (4–4)	Breslin Center; East Lansing, MI
Feb 7, 2004		at Indiana	W 84–82 ^{2OT}	12–8 (5–4)	Assembly Hall; Bloomington, IN
Feb 11, 2004		No. 17 Wisconsin	L 52–54	12–9 (5–5)	Carver-Hawkeye Arena; Iowa City, IA
Feb 14, 2004		Michigan	W 69–61	13–9 (6–5)	Carver-Hawkeye Arena; Iowa City, IA
Feb 18, 2004		at Ohio State	W 78–67	14–9 (7–5)	Value City Arena; Columbus, OH
Feb 25, 2004		No. 23 Illinois	L 59–78	14–10 (7–6)	Carver-Hawkeye Arena; Iowa City, IA
Feb 28, 2004		Minnesota	W 66–62	15–10 (8–6)	Carver-Hawkeye Arena; Iowa City, IA
Mar 3, 2004		at Northwestern	L 49–51	15–11 (8–7)	Welsh-Ryan Arena; Evanston, IL
Mar 6, 2004		at Purdue	W 63–62	16–11 (9–7)	Mackey Arena; West Lafayette, IN
Big Ten tournament
Mar 12, 2004*		vs. Michigan	L 70–79	16–12	Conseco Fieldhouse; Indianapolis, IN
National Invitation Tournament
Mar 16, 2004*		at Saint Louis	L 69–70	16–13	Savvis Center; St. Louis, MO
*Non-conference game. ^{#}Rankings from AP Poll. (#) Tournament seedings in parentheses.
