= Chris Hill (basketball) =

American basketball player

Personal information
- Born: February 21, 1983 (age 43) Indianapolis, Indiana, U.S.
- Listed height: 6 ft 3 in (1.91 m)
- Listed weight: 190 lb (86 kg)

Career information
- High school: Lawrence North (Indianapolis, Indiana)
- College: Michigan State (2001–2005)
- NBA draft: 2005: undrafted
- Playing career: 2005–2014
- Position: Shooting guard

Career history
- 2005–2006: ALM Évreux
- 2006–2007: Stade Clermontois
- 2007–2008: Bandırma Banvit
- 2008–2009: Liège
- 2009–2012: Spirou
- 2012–2014: Orléans Loiret

Career highlights
- 2× Belgian League champion (2010, 2011); Belgian Supercup winner (2010); Men's Basketball Academic All-American of the Year (2005); 2x First team Academic All-American (2004, 2005); Third team Academic All-American (2003); 2x Second team All-Big Ten (2003, 2004)

Christopher Joseph Vogel Hill (born February 21, 1983) is an American former professional basketball player. He has played in the Ligue Nationale de Basketball, Turkish Basketball League and Basketball League Belgium.

He played college basketball for the NCAA Division I Michigan State where he twice led the Big Ten Conference in three point shots made and set the former Big Ten single-game three point shots made record. He was a two-time All-Big Ten Conference selection, a three-time Academic All-America and the 2005 Men's Basketball Academic All-American of the Year. He represented Team USA at the 2003 Pan American Games.

== Early life ==
He attended Indian Creek Elementary in Indianapolis. Hill played high school basketball at Lawrence North High School in Indianapolis, Indiana where he was a 2001 All-State selection and an honorable mention Associated Press All-State honoree in 2000. He also set school records for both career and single-season passing yardage and touchdowns as the school's quarterback.

As a freshman basketball player, he set the school single-game record with 8 three point shots made during a 28-point outing in a victory over Terre Haute South Vigo High School that extended Lawrence North's record to 21–0. Lawrence North then lost to Terre Haute North Vigo High School in the regular season finale before the 1999 Indiana High School Athletic Association (IHSAA) Class 4A playoffs began. Hill was a 1999 All-state honorable mention honoree as a sophomore. He averaged 14 points, 4.5 assists that year.

In football Hill threw for 249 yards in the Section 5 football playoff game against North Central High School. By basketball season of his junior year, he was listed at 6 ft 3 in (1.91 m). That year he recorded average of 16.9 points, 5.0 rebounds and 4.0 assists for an 18–4 team.

Hill's scholarship offers included his dream school, Notre Dame. But after his all-star team recognition at the Las Vegas Nationals earned him an offer from a 2000–01 Michigan State Spartans men's basketball team that was graduating five seniors, the Spartans felt like a much better fit for him because of the likelihood of immediate playing time. Hill joined a signing class with Kelvin Torbert (the nation's number 2 prospect) and Alan Anderson. Michigan State head coach Tom Izzo described Hill as the school's first pure shooter since Shawn Respert had graduated in 1995.

As a senior, Hill missed a pair of games that his school lost due his having mononucleosis. That team finished 21–6 after losing in the state semifinals (dubbed the semistate championship).

== College career ==
On January 27, 2003, he was named the Big Ten Conference Player of the Week. During the previous week, he had had two 20-point performances. A month later on February 23, he set the past Big Ten Conference record for single-game three point shots made (10). The record remained unmatched until Jon Diebler tied it on March 1, 2011. Bryn Forbes finally surpassed the mark on March 2, 2016. Hill led the Big Ten in three point shots made. He was co-MVP of the 2002–03 Michigan State Spartans men's basketball team. Hill was a 2003 third team Academic All-America selection. Hill was a 2003 second team All-Big Ten selection.

Hill repeated as the Big Ten three point shots made leader for the 2003–04 Spartans, joining Shawn Respert, Louis Bullock, Craig Moore, and Jon Diebler as two-time leaders. At the time of his 2004 recognition, he was the only two-time Academic All-America honoree in Michigan State basketball history. Hill was a 2004 First team Academic All-America selection. Hill was a 2004 second team All-Big Ten selection.

In 2005, he was named the Men's Basketball Academic All-American of the Year. Hill served as captain for the 2004–05 Spartans who reached the final four of the 2005 NCAA Division I men's basketball tournament where they lost on April 2 to the eventual champions, North Carolina. Hill scored 3 points in the game on 1–6 (1–5 3 point) shooting. As of March 2024, he was one of four three-time Academic All-Americas in Big Ten Conference history and the only multiple Academic All-American in Michigan State history. During Hill's Spartan career, he led the team in 3-point shots made 4 times, assists and steals 3 times and scoring once.

He was selected as a member of the United States men's national basketball team for the 2003 Pan-American Games and earned the Michigan State Freshman Student-Athlete of the Year in 2002. Sports Illustrated reported his natural position as point guard and noted he was an excellent golfer.

== Professional career ==
Hill played for ALM Évreux Basket of the French Pro B in 2005–06. He then played for Stade Clermontois BA of the French Pro A in 2006–07, and Bandırma Banvit of Turkish Basketball League for the following year. For the 2008–09 season, Hill joined Liège Basket of the Basketball League Belgium. He continued in Belgium for the next three seasons with Spirou Charleroi, winning the Belgian National Championship in 2009–10 and 2010–11. Hill returned to the Pro A in 2012–13 to play for Orléans Loiret, but having rejoined the team for the 2013–14 season, he was limited to only three games.

After his basketball career ended, Hill, who majored in finance, joined United Wholesale Mortgage to work in secondary marketing for Mat Ishbia who overlapped with him at Michigan State.
