= Daniel Horton (basketball) =

American basketball player

Personal information
- Born: April 21, 1984 (age 42) Baton Rouge, Louisiana, U.S.
- Listed height: 6 ft 3 in (1.91 m)

Career information
- High school: Cedar Hill (Cedar Hill, Texas)
- College: Michigan (2002–2006)
- Playing career: 2006–2012
- Position: Guard

Career history
- 2006: Pınar Karşıyaka
- 2007: Los Angeles D-Fenders
- 2007–2008: Albuquerque Thunderbirds
- 2008: Hyères-Toulon
- 2008: Pau-Orthez
- 2009–2010: Hyères-Toulon
- 2012: Bendigo Braves
- 2012: Korihait

Career highlights
- First-team All-Big Ten (2006); Second-team All-Big Ten (2003); 2× Michigan Wolverines' Bill Buntin MVP (2003, 2006); National Invitation Tournament MVP (2004); Big Ten Freshman of the Year (2003); McDonald's All-American (2002); Second-team Parade All-American (2002)
Medals
Men's basketball
Representing the United States
FIBA Americas U18 Championship
Bronze medal – third place	2002 Margarita Island	National team

Daniel Horton (born April 21, 1984) is an American former professional basketball player. He played college basketball as a guard for the Michigan Wolverines, twice earning All-Big Ten and team MVP honors. In high school, Horton was a McDonald's All-American and represented the United States national under-18 team in the 2002 FIBA Under-18 AmeriCup.

== College career ==
Horton played four seasons at the University of Michigan, from 2002 to 2006. He entered as the No. 14 overall recruit in the country according to ESPN, one spot behind Chris Bosh. Horton represented the United States national under-18 team in the 2002 FIBA Under-18 AmeriCup and was a starter in the McDonald's All-American Game in 2002. It would be two decades before the Wolverines would sign another McDonald's All-American recruit. In 2003, he was named the Big Ten Freshman of the Year, selected to the All-Big Ten Second Team and earned the Michigan Wolverines' Bill Buntin MVP award. In 2004, he won the National Invitation Tournament (NIT) with the Wolverines and earned its MVP award. In 2005, he missed the majority of the season with a knee injury. In 2006, he was voted to the All-Big Ten First Team by the media, the All-Big Ten Second Team by the coaches and won his second Bill Buntin MVP award. While at Michigan, Horton averaged 14.7 points, 4.4 assists, 2.6 rebounds and 1.7 steals.

As a senior, he earned many of Michigans's yearly awards in 2006, including the aforementioned Bill Buntin Most Valuable Player Award, the Wayman Britt Outstanding Defensive Player Award, the Gary Grant Award for Most Assists, the Outstanding Free Throw Shooting Award and the Iron Man Award. Horton led the Wolverines in scoring, assists and steals, and finished the year fifth in the nation with a 90.1 free throw percentage (second all-time in Michigan basketball history), including a Big Ten single-season record with a 97.8 free throw percentage in conference games. On February 21, 2006, Horton scored a collegiate-high 39 points against Illinois. He finished his career second all-time in school history in steals (187), three-point field goals (233), three-point fields goals attempted (651), fourth all-time in assists (484) and eleventh in points scored (1,614).

=== College statistics ===
Year	Team	GP	GS	MPG	FG%	3P%	FT%	RPG	APG	SPG	BPG	PPG
2002–03	Michigan	30	30	36.1	.372	.343	.764	2.3	4.5	1.4	0.4	15.2
2003–04	Michigan	34	32	31.6	.366	.342	.705	2.9	3.6	1.8	0.2	12.2
2004–05	Michigan	13	11	32.1	.387	.357	.745	2.8	4.2	1.7	0.2	12.4
2005–06	Michigan	33	33	34.1	.447	.394	.901	2.5	5.3	1.9	0.3	17.6
Career		110	106	33.6	.396	.358	.796	2.6	4.4	1.7	0.3	14.7

== Professional career ==
After going unselected the 2006 NBA draft, Horton was signed by the Miami Heat in the 2007 preseason. He played in one game before he was waived by the Heat in October 2006. Horton then moved to Turkey and signed in the Turkish Premier league with the Pınar Karşıyaka. He left after a couple of months of not receiving his wages from the team, and signed with the Los Angeles D-Fenders in February 2007. In 2008, he signed in France in the Ligue Nationale de Basketball with the Hyères-Toulon Var Basket. In 2012, he signed with the Bendigo Braves in the SEABL (South East Australia Basketball League). In August 2012, Daniel Horton signed a contract to play in Finland with Korihait.
