= 2004 Big Ten men's basketball tournament =

- Classification: Division I
- Season: 2003–04
- Teams: 11
- Site: Conseco Fieldhouse; Indianapolis, Indiana
- Champions: Wisconsin Badgers (1st title)
- Winning coach: Bo Ryan (1st title)
- MVP: Devin Harris (Wisconsin)

2003–04 Big Ten Conference men's basketball standings
	Conf.				Overall
Team	W		L	PCT	W		L	PCT
No. 13 Illinois	13	–	3	.813	26	–	7	.788
No. 10 Wisconsin †	12	–	4	.750	25	–	7	.781
Michigan State	12	–	4	.750	18	–	12	.600
Iowa	9	–	7	.563	16	–	13	.552
Michigan	8	–	8	.500	23	–	11	.676
Northwestern	8	–	8	.500	14	–	15	.483
Purdue	7	–	9	.438	17	–	14	.548
Indiana	7	–	9	.438	14	–	15	.483
Ohio State	6	–	10	.375	14	–	16	.467
Minnesota	3	–	13	.188	12	–	18	.400
Penn State	3	–	13	.188	9	–	19	.321
† 2004 Big Ten tournament winner Rankings from AP poll

The 2004 Big Ten men's basketball tournament was the postseason men's basketball tournament for the Big Ten Conference and was played between March 11 and March 14, 2004, at Conseco Fieldhouse in Indianapolis, Indiana. The championship was won by Wisconsin who defeated Illinois in the championship game. As a result, Wisconsin received the Big Ten's automatic bid to the NCAA tournament. The win marked Wisconsin's first win in their first appearance in the championship game. It also marked the first time in tournament history that the top two seeds appeared in the championship game.

== Seeds ==
All Big Ten schools played in the tournament. Teams were seeded by conference record, with a tiebreaker system used to seed teams with identical conference records. Seeding for the tournament was determined at the close of the regular conference season. The top five teams received a first round bye.

Seed	School	Conference
1	Illinois	13–3
2	Wisconsin	12–4
3	Michigan State	12–4
4	Iowa	9–7
5	Michigan	8–8
6	Northwestern	8–8
7	Purdue	7–9
8	Indiana	7–9
9	Ohio State	6–10
10	Minnesota	3–13
11	Penn State	3–13

== Bracket ==
Opening round March 11
8	Indiana	83
9	Ohio State	69
7	Purdue	52
10	Minnesota	63
6	Northwestern	57
11	Penn State	52

Quarterfinals; March 12
1	#12 Illinois	71
8	Indiana	59
4	Iowa	70
5	Michigan	79
2	#10 Wisconsin	66
10	Minnesota	52
3	Michigan State	68
6	Northwestern	55

Semifinals; March 13
1	#12 Illinois	74
5	Michigan	60
2	#10 Wisconsin	68
3	Michigan State	66

Championship; March 14
1	#12 Illinois	53
2	#10 Wisconsin	70

== Honors ==
=== All-Tournament Team ===
- Devin Harris, Wisconsin – Big Ten tournament Most Outstanding Player
- Dee Brown, Illinois
- Deron Williams, Illinois
- Jitim Young, Northwestern
- Mike Wilkinson, Wisconsin
