= Gary Grant (basketball) =

American basketball player (born 1965)

Personal information
- Born: April 21, 1965 (age 61) Canton, Ohio, U.S.
- Listed height: 6 ft 3 in (1.91 m)
- Listed weight: 185 lb (84 kg)

Career information
- High school: Canton McKinley (Canton, Ohio)
- College: Michigan (1984–1988)
- NBA draft: 1988: 1st round, 15th overall pick
- Drafted by: Seattle SuperSonics
- Playing career: 1988–2002
- Position: Point guard
- Number: 23, 1, 14

Career history
- 1988–1995: Los Angeles Clippers
- 1995–1996: New York Knicks
- 1996–1997: Miami Heat
- 1997: Yakima Sun Kings
- 1998: Portland Trail Blazers
- 1998–1999: Aris
- 1999–2001: Portland Trail Blazers
- 2001–2002: Peristeri

Career highlights
- Consensus first-team All-American (1988); Second-team All-American – USBWA (1987); Big Ten Player of the Year (1988); Big Ten Freshman of the Year (1986); 2× First-team All-Big Ten (1987, 1988); First-team Parade All-American (1984); McDonald's All-American (1984)

Career NBA statistics
- Points: 4,368 (7.9 ppg)
- Assists: 3,013 (5.5 apg)
- Rebounds: 1,283 (2.3 rpg)
- Stats at NBA.com
- Stats at Basketball Reference

Gary Grant (born April 21, 1965) is an American former professional basketball player at the point guard position in the National Basketball Association (NBA). He also played four professional seasons in Greece. Grant was an All-American college player for the Michigan Wolverines.

== College career ==
Gary "The General" Grant played for Canton McKinley High School and collegiately at the University of Michigan. Gary received his BA in kinesiology.

Grant holds several Michigan records including career starts (128), career assists (731), career steals (total and per game), career minutes, career turnovers, single-season assists per game, single-season steals (total and per game, 1st, 2nd and 3rd places for both), single-season turnovers, and single-game steals.

During the 2010–11 NCAA Division I men's basketball season while playing for the 2010–11 Michigan Wolverines team, Darius Morris surpassed Grant's school record single-season assist total set for the 1987–88 team. The following season Trey Burke broke Grant's freshman season assist total record. In the regular season finale for the 2016–17 team, Derrick Walton broke his single-game assists record.

== Professional career ==
He was selected in the 1988 NBA draft by the Seattle SuperSonics, but his rights were traded to the Los Angeles Clippers on draft night with a future first-round pick for Michael Cage. On April 4, 1989, during a win over the Trail Blazers, Grant scored 17 points and recorded 20 assists, the latter of which was the highest single game total of any player in the NBA all season. The following season, Grant averaged career-highs of 13.1 points, 10 assists, 3.1 rebounds, and 2.5 steals per game each. Ultimately, he remained a Clipper for seven years before moving on to the New York Knicks, the Miami Heat, and the Portland Trail Blazers.

== Personal life ==
Grant has three children with Tammie Grant: Taryn, Mahogany, and Piper.

He has a cameo appearance in the 1992 Dean Cameron film Miracle Beach.

== Career statistics ==
Legend
GP	Games played	GS	Games started	MPG	Minutes per game
FG%	Field goal percentage	3P%	3-point field goal percentage	FT%	Free throw percentage
RPG	Rebounds per game	APG	Assists per game	SPG	Steals per game
BPG	Blocks per game	PPG	Points per game	**Bold**	Career high

=== NBA ===
==== Regular season ====
Year	Team	GP	GS	MPG	FG%	3P%	FT%	RPG	APG	SPG	BPG	PPG
1988–89	L.A. Clippers	71	48	27.1	.435	.227	.735	3.4	7.1	2.0	.1	11.9
1989–90	L.A. Clippers	44	44	**34.8**	.466	.238	.779	**4.4**	**10.0**	**2.5**	.1	**13.1**
1990–91	L.A. Clippers	68	**65**	31.0	.451	.231	.689	3.1	8.6	1.5	**.2**	8.7
1991–92	L.A. Clippers	**78**	53	26.3	.462	.294	.815	2.4	6.9	1.8	**.2**	7.8
1992–93	L.A. Clippers	74	8	21.9	.441	.262	.743	1.9	4.8	1.4	.1	6.6
1993–94	L.A. Clippers	**78**	8	19.7	.449	.274	.855	1.8	3.7	1.5	**.2**	7.5
1994–95	L.A. Clippers	33	2	14.2	.470	.250	.818	1.1	2.8	.9	.1	6.2
1995–96	New York	47	1	12.7	.486	.333	.828	1.1	1.5	.8	.1	4.9
1996–97	Miami	28	0	13.0	.355	.304	.818	1.4	1.6	.6	.0	3.9
1997–98	Portland	22	2	16.3	.462	**.368**	**.857**	2.2	3.8	.8	.1	4.8
1998–99	Portland	2	0	3.5	.000	–	–	.0	1.5	.5	.0	.0
1999–00	Portland	3	0	8.0	.429	–	–	1.0	.3	.3	.0	4.0
2000–01	Portland	4	0	4.3	**.714**	–	–	.0	.3	.0	.0	2.5
Career		552	231	22.8	.450	.278	.776	2.3	5.5	1.5	.1	7.9

==== Playoffs ====
Year	Team	GP	GS	MPG	FG%	3P%	FT%	RPG	APG	SPG	BPG	PPG
1992	L.A. Clippers	**5**	**1**	15.4	**.476**	.000	**1.000**	.8	3.6	.6	**.4**	4.4
1993	L.A. Clippers	**5**	0	**20.2**	.323	–	.500	.4	**4.6**	.6	.0	4.2
1996	New York	1	0	8.0	.400	**.667**	–	**3.0**	.0	**1.0**	.0	**6.0**
1998	Portland	4	0	6.8	.286	.250	–	1.3	1.8	.3	.3	1.3
2000	Portland	2	0	4.0	.000	–	.500	.0	.5	.0	.0	.5
Career		17	1	13.0	.364	.333	.667	.8	2.9	.5	.2	3.2

== See also ==
- Michigan Wolverines men's basketball statistical leaders
