= 2003–04 Wisconsin Badgers men's basketball team =

American college basketball season

2003–04 Wisconsin Badgers men's basketball

Big Ten tournament champions

NCAA tournament, Round of 32
- Conference: Big Ten Conference

Ranking
- Coaches: No. 16
- AP: No. 10
- Record: 25–7 (12–4 Big Ten)
- Head coach: Bo Ryan (3rd season)
- Associate head coach: Rob Jeter
- Assistant coaches: Greg Gard; Gary Close
- Home arena: Kohl Center

2003–04 Big Ten Conference men's basketball standings
	Conf.				Overall
Team	W		L	PCT	W		L	PCT
No. 13 Illinois	13	–	3	.813	26	–	7	.788
No. 10 Wisconsin †	12	–	4	.750	25	–	7	.781
Michigan State	12	–	4	.750	18	–	12	.600
Iowa	9	–	7	.563	16	–	13	.552
Michigan	8	–	8	.500	23	–	11	.676
Northwestern	8	–	8	.500	14	–	15	.483
Purdue	7	–	9	.438	17	–	14	.548
Indiana	7	–	9	.438	14	–	15	.483
Ohio State	6	–	10	.375	14	–	16	.467
Minnesota	3	–	13	.188	12	–	18	.400
Penn State	3	–	13	.188	9	–	19	.321
† 2004 Big Ten tournament winner Rankings from AP poll

The 2003–04 Wisconsin Badgers men's basketball team represented University of Wisconsin–Madison. The head coach was Bo Ryan, coaching his third season with the Badgers. The team played its home games at the Kohl Center in Madison, Wisconsin and is a member of the Big Ten Conference.

== Roster ==
2003–04 Wisconsin Badgers men's basketball team
Players
Coaches

Pos.	#	Name	Height	Weight	Year	Hometown
G	1	Sharif Chambliss (I) (redshirt)	6 ft 1 in (1.85 m)	185 lb (84 kg)	Sr	Racine, Wisconsin
G	3	Ike Ukawuba	6 ft 3 in (1.91 m)	190 lb (86 kg)	Sr	Chicago
F	4	Ray Nixon	6 ft 8 in (2.03 m)	205 lb (93 kg)	So	Whitefish Bay, Wisconsin
F/C	5	Jason Chappell (redshirt)	6 ft 10 in (2.08 m)	240 lb (109 kg)	So	New Berlin, Wisconsin
G	12	Boo Wade	6 ft 3 in (1.91 m)	185 lb (84 kg)	So	Milwaukee
G	13	Clayton Hanson (W)	6 ft 5 in (1.96 m)	195 lb (88 kg)	Jr	Reedsburg, Wisconsin
F/C	21	Andreas Helmigk	6 ft 9 in (2.06 m)	245 lb (111 kg)	RS So	Klagenfurt
G	23	Kammron Taylor	6 ft 2 in (1.88 m)	175 lb (79 kg)	Fr	Minneapolis
G	24	Freddie Owens	6 ft 2 in (1.88 m)	190 lb (86 kg)	Sr	Milwaukee
C	30	Dave Mader	6 ft 11 in (2.11 m)	265 lb (120 kg)	RS Sr	Appleton, Wisconsin
F/C	32	Brian Butch (redshirt)	6 ft 11 in (2.11 m)	215 lb (98 kg)	Fr	Appleton, Wisconsin
G	34	Devin Harris	6 ft 3 in (1.91 m)	175 lb (79 kg)	Jr	Milwaukee
F	42	Alando Tucker (injured) (redshirt)	6 ft 5 in (1.96 m)	205 lb (93 kg)	So	Lockport, Illinois
F	44	Zach Morley	6 ft 8 in (2.03 m)	220 lb (100 kg)	Jr	Maryville, Missouri
F	54	Mike Wilkinson	6 ft 8 in (2.03 m)	240 lb (109 kg)	RS Jr	Blue Mounds, Wisconsin

Head coach

- Bo Ryan (Wilkes)

Assistant coach(es)

- Rob Jeter (UW-Platteville)
- Greg Gard (UW-Platteville)
- Gary Close (Arizona State)

Legend

- (C) Team captain
- (S) Suspended
- (I) Ineligible
- (W) Walk-on
- Injured
- Current redshirt

Roster
Last update: 2014-1-10

== Schedule ==
Date time, TV	Rank^{#}	Opponent^{#}	Result	Record	Site city, state
Regular Season
11/21/2003*; 5:00 pm, CSTV	No. 15	at Penn	W 64–53	1–0	Palestra; Philadelphia, Pennsylvania
11/25/2003*; 7:05 pm	No. 15	Eastern Illinois	W 81–47	2–0	Kohl Center; Madison, Wisconsin
11/29/2003*; 7:00 pm, ESPN	No. 15	Rutgers	W 55–43	3–0	Kohl Center; Madison, Wisconsin
12/02/2003*; 8:30 pm	No. 15	at Maryland; ACC–Big Ten Challenge	L 67–73	3–1	Comcast Center; College Park, Maryland
12/06/2003*; 7:00 pm	No. 15	Detroit	W 68–42	4–1	Kohl Center; Madison, Wisconsin
12/10/2003*; 7:00 pm, ESPN/WPT	No. 23	Green Bay	W 73–57	5–1	Kohl Center; Madison, Wisconsin
12/13/2003*; 7:30 pm, ESPNU	No. 24	Milwaukee	W 89–71	6–1	Kohl Center; Madison, Wisconsin
12/20/2003*; 1:00 pm, ESPN	No. 22	No. 23 Marquette	W 63–59	7–1	Kohl Center; Madison, Wisconsin
12/27/2003*; 7:30 pm	No. 19	vs. Ohio; Rock-N-Roll Shootout	W 71–48	8–1	Gund Arena; Cleveland, Ohio
12/30/2003*; 8:00 pm, ESPN	No. 19	at Alabama	L 56–71	8–2	Coleman Coliseum; Tuscaloosa, AL
1/03/2004*; 1:00 pm, ESPNU	No. 18	College of Charleston	W 75–49	9–2	Kohl Center; Madison, Wisconsin
1/06/2004; 6:00 pm, ESPN	No. 21	Indiana	W 79–45	10–2 (1–0)	Kohl Center; Madison, Wisconsin
1/10/2004; 7:00 pm, ESPN		Michigan State	W 77–64	11–2 (2–0)	Kohl Center; Madison, Wisconsin
1/14/2004; 7:00 pm, ESPNU	No. 19	at Purdue	L 51–53	11–3 (2–1)	Mackey Arena; West Lafayette, Indiana
1/21/2004; 8:00 pm, ESPN	No. 21	Michigan	W 74–63	12–3 (3–1)	Kohl Center; Madison, Wisconsin
1/24/2004; 1:32 pm, ESPN+	No. 21	Illinois	W 76–56	13–3 (4–1)	Kohl Center; Madison, Wisconsin
1/28/2004; 7:00 pm, ESPNU	No. 17	Ohio State	W 69–57	14–3 (5–1)	St. John Arena; Columbus, Ohio
2/04/2004; 7:00 pm, ESPN	No. 14	Minnesota	W 80–66	15–3 (6–1)	Kohl Center; Madison, Wisconsin
2/07/2004; 1:32 pm, ESPN	No. 14	at Northwestern	L 51–69	15–4 (6–2)	Welsh-Ryan Arena; Evanston, Illinois
2/11/2004; 7:00 pm, ESPNU	No. 17	at Iowa	W 54–52	16–4 (7–2)	Carver–Hawkeye Arena; Iowa City, IA
2/14/2004; 6:00 pm, ESPN	No. 17	Ohio State	W 78–48	17–4 (8–2)	Kohl Center; Madison, Wisconsin
2/18/2004; 7:00 pm, ESPN	No. 12	at Illinois	L 57–65	17–5 (8–3)	Assembly Hall; Champaign, Illinois
2/22/2004; 1:00 pm	No. 12	at Michigan	L 59–71	17–6 (8–4)	Crisler Arena; Ann Arbor, Michigan
2/25/2004; 7:00 pm, ESPN	No. 22	Penn State	W 68–45	18–6 (9–4)	Kohl Center; Madison, Wisconsin
2/29/2004; 1:00 pm, ESPN	No. 22	Purdue	W 82–46	19–6 (10–4)	Kohl Center; Madison, Wisconsin
3/02/2004; 6:00 pm, ESPN	No. 17	at Michigan State	W 68–64	20–6 (11–4)	Breslin Student Events Center; East Lansing, Michigan
3/06/2004; 11:17 am	No. 17	at Indiana	W 70–52	21–6 (12–4)	Assembly Hall; Bloomington, Indiana
Big Ten tournament
3/12/2004; 5:40 pm, UPN	No. 10	vs. Minnesota; Big Ten tournament – Quarterfinals	W 66–52	22–6	Conseco Fieldhouse; Indianapolis, Indiana
3/13/2004; 3:05 pm, CBS	No. 10	vs. Michigan State; Big Ten tournament – Semifinals	W 68–66	23–6	Conseco Fieldhouse; Indianapolis
3/14/2004; 2:30 pm, CBS	No. 10	vs. No. 12 Illinois; Big Ten tournament – Finals	W 70–53	24–6	Conseco Fieldhouse; Indianapolis
NCAA tournament
3/19/2004*; 6:20 pm, CBS	(6)	vs. (11) Richmond; First Round	W 76–64	25–6	Bradley Center; Milwaukee
3/21/2004*; 3:52 pm, CBS	(6) No. 10	vs. (3) No. 9 Pittsburgh; Second Round	L 55–59	25–7	Bradley Center; Milwaukee
*Non-conference game. ^{#}Rankings from AP Poll. (#) Tournament seedings in parentheses.
