= Dion Harris =

American basketball player

Personal information
- Born: April 27, 1985 (age 41) Detroit, Michigan, U.S.
- Listed height: 190 cm (6 ft 3 in)
- Listed weight: 93 kg (205 lb)

Career information
- High school: Redford (Detroit, Michigan)
- College: Michigan (2003–2007)
- Playing career: 2007–2015
- Position: Guard

Career history
- 2007–2008: Polpak Swiecie
- 2008–2011: Achilleas Kaimakliou
- 2011–2012: TSV Troester Breitenguessbach
- 2012: Gigantes de Guayana
- 2012–2013: Akita Northern Happinets
- 2013: Piratas de Bogota
- 2015: Telecom Business Hub Jets

Career highlights
- Third-team All-Big Ten (2007); Second-team Parade All-American (2003); Mr. Basketball of Michigan (2003)

Dion Harris (born April 27, 1985) is an American former professional basketball player. He played college basketball for the Michigan Wolverines from 2003 to 2007.

== High school career ==
Harris attended Redford High School in Detroit, Michigan from 1999 to 2003. He was rated as the No. 1 player in the state of Michigan, and was ranked as the No. 28 overall player in the country by Rivals.com and No. 24 by Scout.com (bought by 247Sports). He committed to play college basketball for Tommy Amaker at the University of Michigan in July 2003.

| Year | Team | GP | GS | MPG | FG% | 3P% | FT% | RPG | APG | SPG | BPG | PPG |
|---|---|---|---|---|---|---|---|---|---|---|---|---|
| 2003 | Jordan Classic | 1 | | 22.0 | .556 | .500 | .500 | 7.0 | 2.0 | 2.0 | 0.0 | 14.0 |

=== High school awards & honors ===
- Second-team Parade All-American – (2003)
- Mr. Basketball of Michigan – (2003)

== College career ==
Harris played in 131 career games, (No. 6 all-time) and started 97 times. He scored 1,599 career points (No. 13 all-time), had 268 three-point field goals and 755 three-point field goal attempts (No. 2 all-time), 398 assists (No. 8 all-time) and had 135 steals (No. 9 all-time). Harris was the fifth Michigan player to ever surpass 4,000 career minutes.

=== College statistics ===
| Year | Team | GP | GS | MPG | FG% | 3P% | FT% | RPG | APG | SPG | BPG | PPG |
|---|---|---|---|---|---|---|---|---|---|---|---|---|
| 2003–04 | Michigan | 34 | 11 | 28.1 | .393 | .341 | .772 | 2.2 | 2.2 | 1.0 | 0.1 | 10.1 |
| 2004–05 | Michigan | 31 | 30 | 36.5 | .365 | .333 | .755 | 2.8 | 3.5 | 1.1 | 0.2 | 14.3 |
| 2005–06 | Michigan | 31 | 23 | 31.2 | .403 | .390 | .821 | 2.9 | 2.8 | 0.7 | 0.1 | 11.1 |
| 2006–07 | Michigan | 35 | 33 | 32.8 | .375 | .358 | .858 | 2.1 | 3.6 | 1.1 | 0.1 | 13.4 |
| Career | | 131 | 97 | 32.1 | .382 | .355 | .804 | 2.5 | 3.0 | 1.0 | 0.1 | 12.2 |

=== NCAA awards & honors ===
- 2× Michigan Wolverines' Bill Buntin MVP award – (2005, 2007)
- All-Big Ten third team (coaches and media) – (2007)
- All-Big Ten honorable mention (coaches and media) – (2005)
- All-Big Ten freshman team – (2004)

== Professional statistics ==
Legend
| GP | Games played | GS | Games started | MPG | Minutes per game |
| FG% | Field goal percentage | 3P% | 3-point field goal percentage | FT% | Free throw percentage |
| RPG | Rebounds per game | APG | Assists per game | SPG | Steals per game |
| BPG | Blocks per game | PPG | Points per game | **Bold** | Career high |

=== Regular season ===
| Year | Team | GP | GS | MPG | FG% | 3P% | FT% | RPG | APG | SPG | BPG | PPG |
|---|---|---|---|---|---|---|---|---|---|---|---|---|
| 2007–08 | Świecie | 24 | | 26.2 | .360 | .329 | .718 | 1.8 | 1.7 | 1.4 | 1.1 | 7.8 |
| 2011–12 | TSV | 14 | | 31.9 | .424 | .376 | .892 | 2.7 | 2.1 | 0.6 | 0.3 | 16.2 |
| 2011–12 | Gigantes | 2 | 1 | 24.9 | .500 | .500 | .000 | 3.00 | 1.50 | 1.00 | 0.00 | 10.0 |
| 2012–13 | Akita | 51 | | 26.0 | .375 | .313 | .673 | 3.4 | 3.0 | 0.9 | 0.2 | 13.7 |
| 2014–15 | Telecom | 18 | 16 | 30.7 | .394 | .345 | .808 | 4.22 | 2.17 | 0.56 | 0.22 | 18.22 |

=== Playoffs ===
| Year | Team | GP | GS | MPG | FG% | 3P% | FT% | RPG | APG | SPG | BPG | PPG |
|---|---|---|---|---|---|---|---|---|---|---|---|---|
| 2007–08 | Swiecie | 16 | | 13.3 | .321 | .308 | .667 | 0.9 | 0.8 | 0.4 | 0.6 | 1.6 |
| 2011–12 | TSV | 3 | | 26.3 | .250 | .176 | .900 | 1.0 | 1.0 | 0.7 | 0.7 | 9.3 |
