= Bernard Robinson (basketball) =

American basketball player (born 1980)

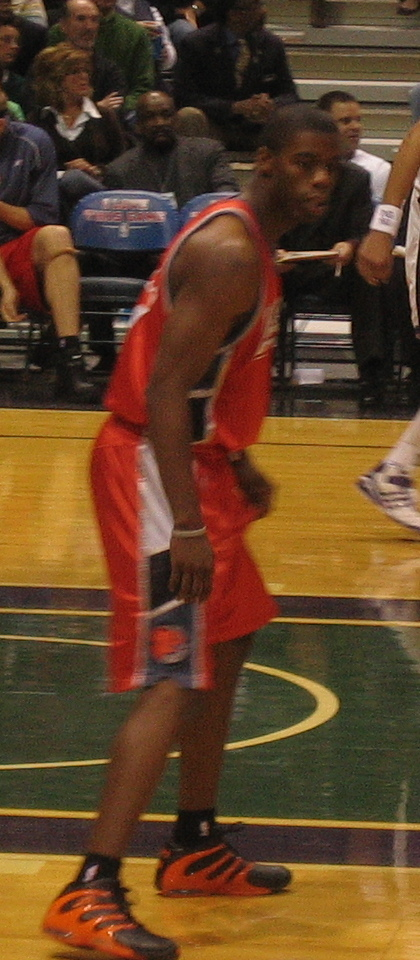
- Robinson with the Charlotte Bobcats in 2006

Personal information
- Born: December 26, 1980 (age 45) Washington, D.C., U.S.
- Listed height: 6 ft 6 in (1.98 m)
- Listed weight: 210 lb (95 kg)

Career information
- High school: Dunbar (Washington, D.C.)
- College: Michigan (2000–2004)
- NBA draft: 2004: 2nd round, 45th overall pick
- Drafted by: Charlotte Bobcats
- Playing career: 2004–2013
- Position: Shooting guard / small forward
- Number: 21, 22

Career history
- 2004–2007: Charlotte Bobcats
- 2007: New Jersey Nets
- 2010: Metros de Santiago
- 2010–2011: Minas Tênis Clube
- 2011–2012: Quimsa
- 2012–2013: Basquete Cearense

Career highlights
- NBB All Star Game MVP (2011)
- Stats at NBA.com
- Stats at Basketball Reference

Bernard Gregory Robinson Jr. (born December 26, 1980) is an American former professional basketball player who played three seasons in the National Basketball Association (NBA) with the Charlotte Bobcats and New Jersey Nets.

== Career ==
After a career at the University of Michigan, where he helped lead the Wolverines to the 2004 NIT title, Robinson was a second round draft pick of the Charlotte Bobcats in the 2004 NBA draft. As a rookie in 2004–05, Robinson appeared in 31 games, averaging 3.0 points and 1.5 rebounds per game.

On January 3, 2007, Robinson was traded by the Bobcats to the New Jersey Nets for Jeff McInnis.

In the 2007 offseason, he tore his medial collateral ligament in his left knee. On October 29, 2007, he was traded to New Orleans Hornets along with Mile Ilić for David Wesley. Both of them were immediately waived by the Hornets.

=== Novo Basquete Brasil (NBB) ===
In 2010, Robinson signed with Minas Tênis Clube in Brazil.

In 2012, he signed with Basquete Cearense in Brazil.
