= Iowa Hawkeyes men's basketball statistical leaders =

The Iowa Hawkeyes men's basketball statistical leaders are individual statistical leaders of the Iowa Hawkeyes men's basketball program in various categories, including points, rebounds, assists, steals, and blocks. Within those areas, the lists identify single-game, single-season, and career leaders. The Hawkeyes represent the University of Iowa in the NCAA's Big Ten Conference.

Iowa began competing in intercollegiate basketball in 1892. However, the school's record book does not generally list records from before the 1950s, as records from before this period are often incomplete and inconsistent. Since scoring was much lower in this era, and teams played much fewer games during a typical season, it is likely that few or no players from this era would appear on these lists anyway.

The NCAA did not officially record assists as a stat until the 1983–84 season, and blocks and steals until the 1985–86 season, but Iowa's record books includes players in these stats before these seasons. These lists are updated through the 2025–26 season. Performances from active players during the 2025–26 season are shown in bold.

== Scoring ==
Career
Rank	Player	Points	Seasons
1	Luka Garza	2,306	2017–18 2018–19 2019–20 2020–21
2	Roy Marble	2,116	1985–86 1986–87 1987–88 1988–89
3	Jordan Bohannon	2,033	2016–17 2017–18 2018–19 2019–20 2020–21 2021–22
4	Aaron White	1,859	2011–12 2012–13 2013–14 2014–15
5	Acie Earl	1,779	1989–90 1990–91 1991–92 1992–93
6	Greg Stokes	1,768	1981–82 1982–83 1983–84 1984–85
7	B. J. Armstrong	1,705	1985–86 1986–87 1987–88 1988–89
8	Roy Devyn Marble	1,694	2010–11 2011–12 2012–13 2013–14
9	Ronnie Lester	1,675	1976–77 1977–78 1978–79 1979–80
10	Matt Gatens	1,635	2008–09 2009–10 2010–11 2011–12

Season
Rank	Player	Points	Season
1	Keegan Murray	822	2021–22
2	Luka Garza	747	2020–21
3	Luka Garza	740	2019–20
4	**Bennett Stirtz**	734	2025–26
5	John Johnson	699	1969–70
6	Roy Marble	675	1988–89
7	Fred Brown	662	1970–71
8	Andre Woolridge	645	1996–97
9	Greg Stokes	638	1984–85
10	Adam Haluska	637	2006–07

Single game
Rank	Player	Points	Season	Opponent
1	John Johnson	49	1969–70	Northwestern
2	John Johnson	46	1968–69	UW-Milwaukee
3	Luka Garza	44	2019–20	Michigan
4	Dick Ives	43	1943–44	Chicago
5	Peter Jok	42	2016–17	Memphis
	Bruce King	42	1976–77	Pittsburgh
7	Luka Garza	41	2020–21	Southern
8	Rick Williams	40	1971–72	South Carolina
9	Sam Williams	39	1966–67	Northwestern
	Don Nelson	39	1961–62	Wisconsin

== Rebounds ==
Career
Rank	Player	Rebounds	Seasons
1	Greg Brunner	990	2002–03 2003–04 2004–05 2005–06
2	Luka Garza	931	2017–18 2018–19 2019–20 2020–21
3	Kevin Kunnert	914	1970–71 1971–72 1972–73
4	Aaron White	901	2011–12 2012–13 2013–14 2014–15
5	Ed Horton	877	1985–86 1986–87 1987–88 1988–89
6	Michael Payne	857	1981–82 1982–83 1983–84 1984–85
7	Bruce King	852	1974–75 1975–76 1976–77
8	Acie Earl	811	1989–90 1990–91 1991–92 1992–93
9	Greg Stokes	807	1981–82 1982–83 1983–84 1984–85
10	Ryan Bowen	804	1994–95 1995–96 1996–97 1997–98

Season
Rank	Player	Rebounds	Season
1	Reggie Evans	416	2000–01
2	Chuck Darling	387	1950–51
3	Reggie Evans	378	2001–02
4	Kevin Kunnert	353	1971–72
5	Ed Horton	350	1988–89
6	Kevin Kunnert	334	1972–73
7	Bruce King	332	1976–77
8	Greg Brunner	314	2005–06
9	Luka Garza	305	2019–20
10	Keegan Murray	303	2021–22

Single game
Rank	Player	Rebounds	Season	Opponent
1	Chuck Darling	30	1951–52	Wisconsin
2	Frank Allen	25	1960–61	California
	Chuck Darling	25	1950–51	Purdue
4	Greg Brunner	23	2005–06	Minnesota
	Kevin Kunnert	23	1972–73	Drake
	Kevin Kunnert	23	1971–72	Illinois
	John Johnson	23	1968–69	Northwestern
	John Johnson	23	1968–69	Cal-Poly
	Tom Harris	23	1960–61	California
	Nolden Gentry	23	1957–58	Michigan
	Bill Logan	23	1954–55	Michigan

== Assists ==
Career
Rank	Player	Assists	Seasons
1	Jordan Bohannon	704	2016–17 2017–18 2018–19 2019–20 2020–21 2021–22
2	Jeff Horner	612	2002–03 2003–04 2004–05 2005–06
3	Andre Woolridge	575	1994–95 1995–96 1996–97
4	Dean Oliver	561	1997–98 1998–99 1999–00 2000–01
5	Mike Gesell	557	2012–13 2013–14 2014–15 2015–16
6	Connor McCaffery	527	2017–18 2018–19 2019–20 2020–21 2021–22 2022–23
7	B. J. Armstrong	517	1985–86 1986–87 1987–88 1988–89
8	Ronnie Lester	480	1976–77 1977–78 1978–79 1979–80
9	Roy Devyn Marble	397	2010–11 2011–12 2012–13 2013–14
10	Mon’ter Glasper	358	1992–93 1993–94 1994–95 1995–96

Season
Rank	Player	Assists	Season
1	Mike Gesell	205	2015–16
2	Andre Woolridge	193	1995–96
3	Andre Woolridge	192	1996–97
4	Cal Wulfsberg	191	1975–76
5	Andre Woolridge	190	1994–95
6	Bryce Cartwright	182	2010–11
7	Jeff Horner	180	2004–05
8	Jordan Bohannon	178	2017–18
9	Jordan Bohannon	175	2016–17
10	Brock Harding	174	2024–25

Single game
Rank	Player	Assists	Season	Opponent
1	Cal Wulfsberg	16	1975–76	Ohio State
2	B. J. Armstrong	15	1988–89	Minnesota
	Tony Perkins	15	2023–24	Nebraska
4	Ronnie Lester	14	1977–78	Northwestern
	Jordan Bohannon	14	2020–21	Minnesota
	Tony Perkins	14	2023–24	Northwestern
7	Cal Wulfsberg	13	1975–76	Michigan
	Jordan Bohannon	13	2016–17	TCU
	Connor McCaffery	13	2022–23	Ohio State
10	Brock Harding	12	2023–24	UMBC
	Mike Gesell	12	2015–16	Minnesota
	Mike Gesell	12	2015–16	Coppin State
	Dean Oliver	12	1997–98	Chicago State
	Kevin Smith	12	1991–92	Centenary
	B. J. Armstrong	12	1988–89	Georgia
	B. J. Armstrong	12	1988–89	Ohio State
	Cal Wulfsberg	12	1976–77	Drake

== Steals ==
Career
Rank	Player	Steals	Seasons
1	Ryan Bowen	208	1994–95 1995–96 1996–97 1997–98
2	Dean Oliver	205	1997–98 1998–99 1999–00 2000–01
3	Kenyon Murray	200	1992–93 1993–94 1994–95 1995–96
4	Roy Marble	183	1985–86 1986–87 1987–88 1988–89
5	Steve Carfino	182	1980–81 1981–82 1982–83 1983–84
6	B. J. Armstrong	178	1985–86 1986–87 1987–88 1988–89
7	Roy Devyn Marble	176	2010–11 2011–12 2012–13 2013–14
8	Jeff Horner	166	2002–03 2003–04 2004–05 2005–06
9	Mike Gesell	160	2012–13 2013–14 2014–15 2015–16
10	Jim Bartels	155	1991–92 1992–93 1993–94 1994–95

Season
Rank	Player	Steals	Season
1	Ryan Bowen	79	1997–98
2	Bill Jones	72	1987–88
3	Jim Bartels	70	1994–95
4	Brody Boyd	68	2003–04
5	Andre Banks	66	1985–86
	Steve Carfino	66	1983–84
7	Dean Oliver	62	1999–00
8	B. J. Armstrong	61	1987–88
9	Roy Marble	60	1987–88
	Roy Devyn Marble	60	2013–14

Single game
Rank	Player	Steals	Season	Opponent
1	Kenyon Murray	9	1994–95	Ohio State
	Acie Earl	9	1992–93	Texas Southern
3	Bill Jones	8	1987–88	Dartmouth
4	Eric May	7	2010–11	SIU-Edwardsville
	Jeff Horner	7	2004–05	Western Illinois
	Brody Boyd	7	2003–04	Northern Illinois
	Ryan Bowen	7	1997–98	Northwestern
	Andre Banks	7	1985–86	Northwestern

== Blocks ==
Career
Rank	Player	Blocks	Seasons
1	Acie Earl	365	1989–90 1990–91 1991–92 1992–93
2	Greg Stokes	229	1981–82 1982–83 1983–84 1984–85
3	Erek Hansen	212	2003–04 2004–05 2005–06
4	Jarrod Uthoff	177	2013–14 2014–15 2015–16
5	Luka Garza	154	2017–18 2018–19 2019–20 2020–21
6	Melsahn Basabe	148	2010–11 2011–12 2012–13 2013–14
7	Gabriel Olaseni	141	2011–12 2012–13 2013–14 2014–15
8	Ryan Bowen	124	1994–95 1995–96 1996–97 1997–98
9	Nicholas Baer	121	2015–16 2016–17 2017–18 2018–19
10	Michael Payne	120	1981–82 1982–83 1983–84 1984–85

Season
Rank	Player	Blocks	Season
1	Acie Earl	121	1991–92
2	Acie Earl	106	1990–91
3	Erek Hansen	89	2005–06
4	Acie Earl	88	1992–93
5	Jarrod Uthoff	86	2015–16
6	Erek Hansen	83	2004–05
7	Greg Stokes	79	1982–83
8	Keegan Murray	68	2021–22
9	Greg Stokes	62	1984–85
10	Owen Freeman	61	2023–24

Single game
Rank	Player	Blocks	Season	Opponent
1	Acie Earl	9	1991–92	Wisconsin
2	Acie Earl	8	1992–93	Drake
	Acie Earl	8	1991–92	Duke
	Acie Earl	8	1991–92	Louisiana Tech
	Acie Earl	8	1991–92	Maryland-Eastern Shore
	Acie Earl	8	1990–91	Northern Iowa
7	Gabriel Olaseni	7	2012–13	Illinois
	Melsahn Basabe	7	2010–11	Iowa State
	Erek Hansen	7	2005–06	Fairfield
	Erek Hansen	7	2004–05	St. Louis
	Erek Hansen	7	2004–05	Iowa State
	Acie Earl	7	1992–93	Michigan State
