= 2005–06 Iowa Hawkeyes men's basketball team =

American college basketball season

2005–06 Iowa Hawkeyes men's basketball

Big Ten tournament champion Hawkeye Challenge champion

NCAA men's Division I tournament, First Round
- Conference: Big Ten Conference

Ranking
- Coaches: No. 23
- AP: No. 15
- Record: 25–9 (11–5 Big Ten)
- Head coach: Steve Alford (7th season)
- Assistant coaches: Brian Jones; Greg Lansing; Paul Weir
- MVPs: Greg Brunner; Erek Hansen; Jeff Horner
- Home arena: Carver–Hawkeye Arena

2005–06 Big Ten Conference men's basketball standings
	Conf.				Overall
Team	W		L	PCT	W		L	PCT
No. 6 Ohio State	12	–	4	.750	26	–	6	.813
No. 15 Iowa †	11	–	5	.688	25	–	9	.735
No. 13 Illinois	11	–	5	.688	26	–	7	.788
Wisconsin	9	–	7	.563	19	–	12	.613
Indiana	9	–	7	.563	19	–	12	.613
Michigan State	8	–	8	.500	22	–	12	.647
Michigan	8	–	8	.500	22	–	11	.667
Penn State	6	–	10	.375	15	–	15	.500
Northwestern	6	–	10	.375	14	–	15	.483
Minnesota	5	–	11	.313	16	–	15	.516
Purdue	3	–	13	.188	9	–	19	.321
† 2006 Big Ten tournament winner As of March 14, 2006; Rankings from AP Poll

The 2005–06 Iowa Hawkeyes men's basketball team represented the University of Iowa as members of the Big Ten Conference during the 2005–06 NCAA Division I men's basketball season. The team was led by seventh-year head coach Steve Alford and played their home games at Carver–Hawkeye Arena. They finished the season 25–9 overall and 11–5 in Big Ten play. The Hawkeyes won the Big Ten tournament to receive an automatic bid to the NCAA tournament as #3 seed in the Atlanta Regional. The season ended in disappointment with an opening round loss at the buzzer to #14 seed Northwestern State, 64–63.

== Roster ==
2005–06 Iowa Hawkeyes men's basketball team
Players
Coaches

Pos.	#	Name	Height	Weight	Year	Hometown
G	1	Adam Haluska	6 ft 5 in (1.96 m)	—	Jr	Carroll, Iowa
G	2	Jeff Horner	6 ft 3 in (1.91 m)	—	Sr	Mason City, Iowa
F	5	Alex Thompson	6 ft 10 in (2.08 m)	—	So	Ames, Iowa
G	11	Tony Freeman	6 ft 1 in (1.85 m)	—	Fr	Maywood, Illinois
F	13	Justin Wieck	6 ft 6 in (1.98 m)	—	Sr	North Liberty, Iowa
G	14	Brett Wessels	6 ft 2 in (1.88 m)	—	Fr	Bettendorf, Iowa
F	20	Ryan Kennedy	6 ft 7 in (2.01 m)	—	Fr	Des Moines, Iowa
F	23	Doug Thomas	6 ft 8 in (2.03 m)	—	So	Inglewood, California
G	25	Carlton Reed	6 ft 4 in (1.93 m)	—	So	Waterloo, Iowa
C	34	Erek Hansen	6 ft 11 in (2.11 m)	—	Sr	Bedford, Texas
G	35	Mike Henderson	6 ft 2 in (1.88 m)	—	Jr	Waterloo, Iowa
F	44	Greg Brunner	6 ft 7 in (2.01 m)	—	Sr	Charles City, Iowa
C	53	Seth Gorney	6 ft 11 in (2.11 m)	—	So	Vandalia, Ohio

Head coach

- Steve Alford (Indiana)

Assistant coach(es)

- Brian Jones (Northern Iowa)
- Greg Lansing (South Dakota)

Legend

- (C) Team captain
- (S) Suspended
- (I) Ineligible
- (W) Walk-on
- Injured
- Current redshirt

== Schedule and results ==
Date time, TV	Rank^{#}	Opponent^{#}	Result	Record	High points	High rebounds	High assists	Site city, state
Regular Season
11/14/2005*; 7:35 pm	No. 20	Maryland-Eastern Shore; Guardians Classic	W 86–41	1–0	16 – 2 tied	10 – Thomas	7 – Horner	Carver–Hawkeye Arena (8,553); Iowa City, Iowa
11/15/2005*; 7:35 pm	No. 20	Colgate; Guardians Classic	W 73–51	2–0	16 – Brunner	8 – 2 tied	8 – Horner	Carver–Hawkeye Arena (8,526); Iowa City, Iowa
11/21/2005*; 8:05 pm, ESPN2	No. 18	vs. No. 7 Kentucky; Guardians Classic	W 67–63	3–0	17 – Brunner	12 – Brunner	8 – Horner	Municipal Auditorium (6,091); Kansas City, Missouri
11/22/2005*; 9:05 pm, ESPN2	No. 18	vs. No. 2 Texas; Guardians Classic	L 59–68	3–1	23 – Haluska	8 – 2 tied	7 – Horner	Municipal Auditorium (6,357); Kansas City, Missouri
11/26/2005*; 12:05 pm	No. 18	Texas-San Antonio	W 79–46	4–1	15 – Haluska	8 – Thomas	4 – 2 tied	Carver–Hawkeye Arena (9,683); Iowa City, Iowa
11/30/2005*; 8:35 pm	No. 14	No. 24 NC State; ACC – Big Ten Challenge	W 45–42	5–1	18 – Haluska	8 – Hansen	6 – Horner	Carver–Hawkeye Arena (13,043); Iowa City, Iowa
12/2/2005*; 8:10 pm	No. 14	Fairfield; Hawkeye Challenge	W 75–59	6–1	23 – Brunner	11 – Brunner	10 – Horner	Carver–Hawkeye Arena (10,002); Iowa City, Iowa
12/3/2005*; 8:10 pm	No. 14	Valparaiso; Hawkeye Challenge	W 72–59	7–1	19 – Horner	13 – Brunner	6 – Horner	Carver–Hawkeye Arena (9,804); Iowa City, Iowa
12/6/2005*; 7:05 pm	No. 12	at Northern Iowa; Iowa Big Four	L 63–67 ^{OT}	7–2	26 – Brunner	10 – Brunner	3 – Haluska	UNI-Dome (13,288); Cedar Falls, Iowa
12/9/2005*; 7:05 pm	No. 12	at Iowa State; Rivalry	L 60–72	7–3	16 – Haluska	12 – Brunner	5 – 2 tied	Hilton Coliseum (14,092); Ames, Iowa
12/17/2005*; 7:05 pm	No. 22	Arizona State	W 62–43	8–3	17 – Haluska	15 – Brunner	7 – Freeman	Carver-Hawkeye Arena (10,902); Iowa City, Iowa
12/20/2005*; 7:05 pm	No. 25	Drake; Iowa Big Four	W 65–60	9–3	17 – Brunner	12 – Brunner	6 – Haluska	Carver-Hawkeye Arena (9,732); Iowa City, Iowa
12/22/2005*; 7:05 pm	No. 25	Robert Morris	W 73–51	10–3	18 – Haluska	10 – Brunner	6 – Henderson	Carver-Hawkeye Arena (9,985); Iowa City, Iowa
12/30/2005*; 7:05 pm		Saint Louis	W 60–50	11–3	17 – 2 tied	8 – Brunner	6 – Horner	Scottrade Center (10,489); St. Louis, Missouri
1/5/2006; 7:05 pm		at Wisconsin	L 52–66	11–4 (0–1)	11 – 2 tied	10 – Brunner	3 – 2 tied	Kohl Center (17,142); Madison, Wisconsin
1/7/2006; 1:05 pm		No. 6 Illinois	W 63–48	12–4 (1–1)	16 – Horner	12 – Brunner	6 – Horner	Carver–Hawkeye Arena (15,500); Iowa City, Iowa
1/14/2006; 11:15 am		at Penn State	W 80–76	13–4 (2–1)	29 – Haluska	7 – Thomas	9 – Horner	Bryce Jordan Center (8,293); University Park, PA
1/18/2006; 7:05 pm	No. 23	Minnesota	W 76–72 ^{3OT}	14–4 (3–1)	20 – Hansen	23 – Brunner	10 – Horner	Carver–Hawkeye Arena (10,535); Iowa City, Iowa
1/21/2006; 11:05 am	No. 23	at No. 11 Michigan State	L 55–85	14–5 (3–2)	19 – Haluska	11 – Brunner	5 – Horner	Breslin Center (14,759); East Lansing, Michigan
1/24/2006; 8:05 pm		No. 13 Indiana	W 73–60	15–5 (4–2)	20 – Haluska	10 – Haluska	8 – Horner	Carver–Hawkeye Arena (11,825); Iowa City, Iowa
1/28/2006; 7:05 pm		No. 16 Ohio State	W 67–62	16–5 (5–2)	18 – Haluska	9 – Brunner	5 – 2 tied	Carver–Hawkeye Arena (15,500); Iowa City, Iowa
2/1/2006; 7:05 pm	No. 23	at Purdue	W 77–68	17–5 (6–2)	32 – Horner	7 – Brunner	4 – 2 tied	Mackey Arena (10,514); West Lafayette, Indiana
2/4/2006; 4:10 pm	No. 23	No. 21 Michigan	W 94–66	18–5 (7–2)	18 – Haluska	9 – Brunner	6 – Horner	Carver–Hawkeye Arena (15,500); Iowa City, Iowa
2/8/2006; 7:05 pm	No. 18	at Northwestern	L 48–51	18–6 (7–3)	13 – Brunner	11 – Brunner	5 – Horner	Welsh-Ryan Arena (5,764); Evanston, Illinois
2/11/2006; 11:05 am	No. 18	at No. 24 Indiana	W 70–67	19–6 (8–3)	19 – Brunner	8 – Brunner	3 – 2 tied	Assembly Hall (17,278); Bloomington, Indiana
2/14/2006	No. 18	No. 16 Michigan State	W 66–54	20–6 (9–3)	15 – 2 tied	10 – Brunner	6 – Horner	Carver–Hawkeye Arena (15,500); Iowa City, Iowa
2/18/2006	No. 18	at Minnesota	L 61–74	20–7 (9–4)	17 – Brunner	7 – Brunner	5 – Horner	Williams Arena (14,308); Minneapolis, MN
2/25/2006	No. 20	at No. 8 Illinois	L 59–71	20–8 (9–5)	27 – Brunner	8 – Horner	4 – Horner	Assembly Hall (16,618); Champaign, Illinois
3/1/2006	No. 23	Penn State	W 65–38	21–8 (10–5)	6 – Henderson	10 – Brunner	5 – Henderson	Carver–Hawkeye Arena (14,012); Iowa City, Iowa
3/4/2006	No. 23	Wisconsin	W 59–44	22–8 (11–5)	22 – Horner	9 – Thomas	6 – Henderson	Carver–Hawkeye Arena (15,500); Iowa City, Iowa
Big Ten tournament
3/10/2006*	(2) No. 20	vs. (10) Minnesota; Quarterfinals	W 67–57	23–8	26 – Horner	8 – Hansen	6 – Horner	Conseco Fieldhouse; Indianapolis, Indiana
3/11/2006*	(2) No. 20	vs. (6) Michigan State; Semifinals	W 53–48	24–8	14 – Horner	8 – 2 Tied	2 – 3 Tied	Conseco Fieldhouse; Indianapolis
3/12/2006*; CBS	(2) No. 20	vs. (1) No. 7 Ohio State; Championship Game	W 67–60	25–8	18 – Horner	8 – 2 Tied	10 – Horner	Conseco Fieldhouse (17,591); Indianapolis
NCAA tournament
3/17/2006*; 11:25 am, CBS	(3 A) No. 11	vs. (14 A) Northwestern State; First Round	L 63–64	25–9	20 – Haluska	10 – Brunner	4 – Horner	The Palace of Auburn Hills (18,456); Auburn Hills, Michigan
*Non-conference game. ^{#}Rankings from AP Poll. (#) Tournament seedings in parentheses. A=Atlanta Regional.

== Rankings ==
Ranking movements Legend: ██ Increase in ranking ██ Decrease in ranking — = Not ranked RV = Received votes
	Week																			
Poll	Pre	1	2	3	4	5	6	7	8	9	10	11	12	13	14	15	16	17	18	Final
AP	20	20	18	14	12	22	25	RV	—	—	23	—	23	18	18	20	23	20	15	Not released
Coaches	20		17	15	13	23	RV	RV	—	—	25	—	—	19	20	22	24	20	15	23

^Coaches did not release a Week 1 poll.
*AP does not release post-NCAA Tournament rankings
