= 2006 Big Ten men's basketball tournament =

- Classification: Division I
- Season: 2005–06
- Teams: 11
- Site: Conseco Fieldhouse; Indianapolis, Indiana
- Champions: Iowa Hawkeyes (2nd title)
- Winning coach: Steve Alford (2nd title)
- MVP: Jeff Horner (Iowa)

2005–06 Big Ten Conference men's basketball standings
| | Conf. | | | | Overall |
| Team | W | | L | PCT | W | | L | PCT |
|---|---|---|---|---|---|---|---|---|
| No. 6 Ohio State | 12 | – | 4 | .750 | 26 | – | 6 | .813 |
| No. 15 Iowa † | 11 | – | 5 | .688 | 25 | – | 9 | .735 |
| No. 13 Illinois | 11 | – | 5 | .688 | 26 | – | 7 | .788 |
| Wisconsin | 9 | – | 7 | .563 | 19 | – | 12 | .613 |
| Indiana | 9 | – | 7 | .563 | 19 | – | 12 | .613 |
| Michigan State | 8 | – | 8 | .500 | 22 | – | 12 | .647 |
| Michigan | 8 | – | 8 | .500 | 22 | – | 11 | .667 |
| Penn State | 6 | – | 10 | .375 | 15 | – | 15 | .500 |
| Northwestern | 6 | – | 10 | .375 | 14 | – | 15 | .483 |
| Minnesota | 5 | – | 11 | .313 | 16 | – | 15 | .516 |
| Purdue | 3 | – | 13 | .188 | 9 | – | 19 | .321 |
† 2006 Big Ten tournament winner As of March 14, 2006; Rankings from AP Poll

The 2006 Big Ten men's basketball tournament was played between March 9 and March 12, 2006, at the Conseco Fieldhouse in Indianapolis, Indiana. It was the ninth annual Big Ten men's basketball tournament. For the third straight year, the top two seed met in the championship game. The championship was won by Iowa Hawkeyes who defeated Ohio State to win the championship. As a result, Iowa received the Big Ten's automatic bid to the NCAA tournament. This marked Iowa's second tournament championship in three appearances.

== Seeds ==
All Big Ten schools played in the tournament. Teams were seeded by conference record, with a tiebreaker system used to seed teams with identical conference records. Seeding for the tournament was determined at the close of the regular conference season. The top five teams received a first round bye.

| Seed | School | Conference | 1st Tiebreaker | 2nd Tiebreaker |
|---|---|---|---|---|
| 1 | Ohio State | 12–4 | | |
| 2 | Iowa | 11–5 | 1–0 vs. OSU | |
| 3 | Illinois | 11–5 | 0–1 vs. OSU | |
| 4 | Wisconsin | 9–7 | 1–0 vs. Ind | |
| 5 | Indiana | 9–7 | 0–1 vs. Wis | |
| 6 | Michigan State | 8–8 | 1–1 vs. Mich | 1–1 vs. OSU |
| 7 | Michigan | 8–8 | 1–1 vs. MSU | 0–1 vs OSU |
| 8 | Penn State | 6–10 | 2–0 vs. NU | |
| 9 | Northwestern | 6–10 | 0–2 vs. PSU | |
| 10 | Minnesota | 5–11 | | |
| 11 | Purdue | 3–13 | | |

== Game summaries ==
ESPN2

Mar 9
12:00 pm

Recap

#8 Penn State 60, #9 Northwestern 42
Scoring by half: 31–21, 29–21
| Pts: Geary Claxton 17; Rebs: Geary Claxton 10; Asts: Will Leiner 4 | Pts: Mohamed Hachad 16; Rebs: Tim Doyle 5 Asts: Mohamed Hachad 3 |

Conseco Fieldhouse
Indianapolis, IN
Attendance: 16,982
Referees: Ed Hightower; J.D. Collins; Sid Rodeheffer

ESPN2

Mar 9
2:30 pm

Recap

#10 Minnesota 59, #7 Michigan 55
Scoring by half: 23–27, 36–28
| Pts: Maurice Hargrow 15; Rebs: Zach Puchtel 15; Asts: Maurice Hargrow 4 | Pts: Dion Harris 16; Rebs: Brent Petway 6 Asts: two tied with 5 |

Conseco Fieldhouse
Indianapolis, IN
Attendance: 16,982
Referees: Donnee Gray; Zelton Steed; Tom Clark

ESPN2

Mar 9
5:05 pm

Recap

#6 Michigan State 70, # 11 Purdue 58
Scoring by half: 31–26, 39–32
| Pts: Maurice Ager 20; Rebs: Paul Davis 7 Asts: two tied with 4 | Pts: Gary Ware 20; Rebs: Matt Kiefer 7 Asts: four tied with 2 |

Conseco Fieldhouse
Indianapolis, IN
Attendance: 16,982
Referees: Mike Sanzere; Paul Janssen; Art McDonald

ESPN

Mar 10
12:00 pm

Recap

#1 Ohio State 63, #8 Penn State 56
Scoring by half: 24–27, 39–29
| Pts: Terence Dials 13; Rebs: Terence Dials 10; Asts: four tied with 4 | Pts: Geary Claxton 18; Rebs: Geary Claxton 12; Asts: Ben Luber 9 |

Conseco Fieldhouse
Indianapolis, IN
Attendance: 18,730
Referees: Donnee Gray, Sid Rodeheffer; Steve Skiles

ESPN

Mar 10
2:30 pm

Recap

#5 Indiana 61, Wisconsin 56
Scoring by half: 15–19, 46–37
| Pts: Marco Killingsworth 20; Rebs: Marco Killingsworth 12; Asts: two tied with 4 | Pts: Alando Tucker 18; Rebs: Brian Butch 9 Asts: two tied with 1 |

Conseco Fieldhouse
Indianapolis, IN
Attendance: 18,730
Referees: Ed Hightower; Art McDonald; Glen Mayborg

ESPN Plus

Mar 10
6:40 pm

Recap

#2 Iowa 67, #10 Minnesota 57
Scoring by half: 30–30, 37–27
| Pts: Jeff Horner 26; Rebs: Erek Hansen 8 Asts: Jeff Horner 6 | Pts: Vincent Grier 29; Rebs: Zach Puchtel 9 Asts: two tied with 2 |

Conseco Fieldhouse
Indianapolis, IN
Attendance: 18,730
Referees: Mike Sanzere; J.D. Collins; Zelton Steed

ESPN Plus

Mar 10
9:10 pm

Recap

#6 Michigan State 61, #3 Illinois 56
Scoring by half: 36–29, 25–27
| Pts: Paul Davis; Drew Neitzel 16; Rebs: Goran Suton 10; Asts: Drew Neitzel 5 | Pts: James Augustine 16; Rebs: James Augustine 15; Asts: Dee Brown 7 |

Conseco Fieldhouse
Indianapolis, IN
Attendance: 18,730
Referees: Ted Hillary; Paul Janssen; Dan Chrisman

CBS

Mar 11
1:40 pm

Recap

#2 Iowa 53, #6 Michigan State 48
Scoring by half: 25–22, 31–23
| Pts: Jeff Horner 14; Rebs: two tied with 5 Asts: three tied with 2 | Pts: Maurice Ager 21; Rebs: Paul Davis 10; Asts: Drew Neitzel 6 |

Conseco Fieldhouse
Indianapolis, IN
Attendance: 18,730
Referees: Ed Hightower; Donnee Gray; J.D. Collins

CBS

Mar 11
4:05 pm

Recap

#1 Ohio State 52, #5 Indiana 48
Scoring by half: 26–25, 27–25
| Pts: J.J. Sullinger 19; Rebs: J.J. Sullinger 13; Asts: James Butler 5 | Pts: Roderick Wilmont 16; Rebs: Marco Killingsworth 10; Asts: Earl Calloway 6 |

Conseco Fieldhouse
Indianapolis, IN
Attendance: 18,730
Referees: Ted Hillary; Mike Sanzere; Paul Janssen

CBS

Mar 12
3:30 pm

Recap

#2 Iowa 67, #1 Ohio State 60
Scoring by half: 26–25, 27–25
| Pts: Jeff Horner 16; Rebs: two tied with 2 Asts: Jeff Horner 10 | Pts: Jamar Butler 19; Rebs: J.J. Sullinger 7 Asts: Jamar Butler 6 |

Conseco Fieldhouse
Indianapolis, IN
Attendance: 17,591
Referees: Ed Hightwoer; Ted Hillary; Donnee Gray

== Bracket ==
Opening Round; March 9
8 | Penn State | 60
9 | Northwestern | 42
7 | Michigan | 55
10 | Minnesota | 59
6 | Michigan State | 70
11 | Purdue | 58

Quarterfinals; March 10
1 | #7 Ohio State | 63
8 | Penn State | 56
4 | Wisconsin | 56
5 | Indiana | 61
2 | #20 Iowa | 67
10 | Minnesota | 57
3 | #9 Illinois | 56
6 | Michigan State | 61

Semifinals; March 11
1 | #7 Ohio State | 52
5 | Indiana | 51
2 | #20 Iowa | 53
6 | Michigan State | 48

Championship; March 12
1 | #7 Ohio State | 60
2 | #20 Iowa | 67

== All-Tournament Team ==
- Jeff Horner, Iowa – Big Ten tournament Most Outstanding Player
- Maurice Ager, Michigan State
- Greg Brunner, Iowa
- Jamar Butler, Ohio State
- J. J. Sullinger, Ohio State
