= Dean Oliver (basketball) =

American basketball player and coach (born 1978)

Personal information
- Born: November 5, 1978 (age 48) Quincy, Illinois, U.S.
- Listed height: 5 ft 11 in (1.80 m)
- Listed weight: 180 lb (82 kg)

Career information
- High school: Mason City (Mason City, Iowa)
- College: Iowa (1997–2001)
- NBA draft: 2001: undrafted
- Playing career: 2001–2011
- Position: Point guard
- Number: 20
- Coaching career: 2011–present

Career history

Playing
- 2001–2002: Golden State Warriors
- 2003: Greenville Groove
- 2003: Asheville Altitude
- 2004: Dakota Wizards
- 2004: Cedar Rapids River Raiders
- 2004–2005: KD Slovan
- 2005–2006: KK Zadar
- 2006–2007: Śląsk Wrocław
- 2007–2010: EiffelTowers
- 2010–2011: JL Bourg-en-Bresse

Coaching
- 2011–2014: North Dakota (assistant)
- 2014–2017: Illinois State (assistant)
- 2017–2024: Wisconsin (assistant)

Career highlights
- 2× Dutch Cup champion (2008, 2009); CBA champion (2004); 3× Third-team All-Big Ten (1999–2001); Iowa Mr. Basketball (1997)
- Stats at NBA.com
- Stats at Basketball Reference

Dean Daniel Oliver (born November 5, 1978) is an American former professional basketball player and assistant coach for the Wisconsin Badgers. An undrafted 5-foot-11-inch (1.80 m) point guard from the University of Iowa, Oliver played with the Golden State Warriors from 2001-02 to 2002-03.

== Early life and college ==
Born in Quincy, Illinois, Oliver graduated from Mason City High School in Mason City, Iowa in 1997 as a member of the National Honor Society with a 3.9 GPA. At the University of Iowa, Oliver played in the Hawkeyes basketball team all four years and graduated in 2001 with a Bachelor of Business Administration in finance. In his senior season, Oliver averaged 14.9 points, 2.8 rebounds, and 4.8 assists per game. Oliver was a three-time third-team All-Big Ten Conference selection (1999–2001) and led the conference in assist/turnover ratio in his senior season.

== Professional career ==
=== Player ===
In March 1996 and 1997 Oliver and his fellow players lead his team, the Mason City Mohawks, to two state tournament wins. Head coach at the time was Robert Horner, father of player and future Hawkeye, Jeff Horner. Oliver was not drafted in the 2001 NBA draft but played two seasons with the Golden State Warriors, who waived Oliver on December 5, 2002. With the Warriors, Oliver played a mostly backup role in 35 games, averaging 1.8 points, 0.7 rebounds, and 1.3 assists per game.

Oliver's final NBA game was played on December 3, 2002, in a 110–89 win over the Denver Nuggets where he recorded 5 points and 1 rebound.

On February 3, 2003, he signed with the Greenville Groove of the NBA Development League (D-League). The Groove waived Oliver on February 23, and Oliver signed with the D-League team Asheville Altitude two days later. In October 2003, Oliver signed with the expansion team of the USBL, Cedar Rapids River Raiders, in his home state of Iowa; the River Raiders would begin play in the spring of 2004. He then signed with the Dakota Wizards of the CBA in February 2004. The Wizards won the 2004 CBA title, and Oliver was a backup for the Wizards.

Oliver began playing in European leagues in 2004.

With Śląsk Wrocław of the Polish Basketball League, Oliver scored 17 points to bring the team to third place in the tournament.

From 2007 to 2010, Oliver played for the Dutch team EiffelTowers, which won Dutch Basketball League Cups in 2008 and 2009.

=== Coach ===
In 2011, he became the head of basketball operations at North Dakota. In 2014, he became an assistant basketball coach at Illinois State. On April 20, 2017, Oliver was named an assistant at Wisconsin under coach Greg Gard.
