= 2005–06 Ohio State Buckeyes men's basketball team =

American college basketball season

2005–06 Ohio State Buckeyes men's basketball

Big Ten regular season champions

NCAA tournament, second round
- Conference: Big Ten

Ranking
- Coaches: No. 13
- AP: No. 6
- Record: 26–6 (12–4 Big Ten)
- Head coach: Thad Matta (2nd season)
- Assistant coaches: Alan Major; Dan Peters; John Groce
- Home arena: Value City Arena

2005–06 Big Ten Conference men's basketball standings
	Conf.				Overall
Team	W		L	PCT	W		L	PCT
No. 6 Ohio State	12	–	4	.750	26	–	6	.813
No. 15 Iowa †	11	–	5	.688	25	–	9	.735
No. 13 Illinois	11	–	5	.688	26	–	7	.788
Wisconsin	9	–	7	.563	19	–	12	.613
Indiana	9	–	7	.563	19	–	12	.613
Michigan State	8	–	8	.500	22	–	12	.647
Michigan	8	–	8	.500	22	–	11	.667
Penn State	6	–	10	.375	15	–	15	.500
Northwestern	6	–	10	.375	14	–	15	.483
Minnesota	5	–	11	.313	16	–	15	.516
Purdue	3	–	13	.188	9	–	19	.321
† 2006 Big Ten tournament winner As of March 14, 2006; Rankings from AP Poll

The 2005–06 Ohio State Buckeyes men's basketball team represented Ohio State University in the 2005–06 NCAA Division I men's basketball season. They were led by their second-year head coach, Thad Matta, and played their home games at the Value City Arena, in Columbus, Ohio as members of the Big Ten Conference. The Buckeyes finished the season 26–6, 12–4 in Big Ten play to win the regular season championship. As the No. 1 seed in the Big Ten tournament, they defeated Penn State and Indiana before losing to Iowa in the championship game. They received an at-large bid to the NCAA tournament as a No. 2 seed in the Minneapolis regional. There they defeated Davidson in the first round before being upset by Georgetown in the second round.

== Previous season ==
The Buckeyes finished the 2004–05 season 20–12, 8–8 in Big Ten play to finish in sixth place. They beat Penn State in the Big Ten tournament before losing to Wisconsin in the quarterfinals.

== Roster ==
2005–06 Ohio State Buckeyes men's basketball team
Players
Coaches

Pos.	#	Name	Height	Weight	Year	Previous school	Hometown
C	21	Brayden Bell	6 ft 8 in (2.03 m)	255 lb (116 kg)	Fr	Brighton High School	Salt Lake City, UT
G	14	Jamar Butler	6 ft 2 in (1.88 m)	195 lb (88 kg)	So	Shawnee High School	Lima, OH
F	34	Terence Dials	6 ft 9 in (2.06 m)	260 lb (118 kg)	Sr	Boardman High School	Youngstown, OH
G	23	Je'Kel Foster	6 ft 2 in (1.88 m)	210 lb (95 kg)	Sr	Natchez High School	Natchez, MS
F	3	Ivan Harris	6 ft 7 in (2.01 m)	220 lb (100 kg)	Jr	Oak Hill Academy	Springfield, OH
F	12	Ron Lewis	6 ft 4 in (1.93 m)	200 lb (91 kg)	Jr	Bowling Green	Columbus, Ohio
G	32	Sylvester Mayes	6 ft 2 in (1.88 m)	195 lb (88 kg)	Jr	Redlands CC	Fort Wayne, IN
G	33	Samuel Payne	6 ft 2 in (1.88 m)	185 lb (84 kg)	Fr	Linden McKinley High School	Columbus, OH
G	0	J.J. Sullinger	6 ft 5 in (1.96 m)	215 lb (98 kg)	Sr	Thomas Worthington High School	Columbus, OH
F	40	Matt Sylvester	6 ft 7 in (2.01 m)	230 lb (104 kg)	Sr	Moeller High School	Cincinnati, OH
F/C	42	Matt Terwilliger	6 ft 9 in (2.06 m)	245 lb (111 kg)	So	Troy High School	Troy, OH

Head coach

- Thad Matta (Butler)

Assistant coach(es)

Legend

- (C) Team captain
- (S) Suspended
- (I) Ineligible
- (W) Walk-on
- Injured
- Current redshirt

Roster
Last update: 2010-04-04

=== Starting lineup ===
Position	Player	Class
C	Terence Dials	
G	Je'Kel Foster	
F	Matt Sylvester	
G/F	J.J. Sullinger	
G	Jamar Butler	

== Schedule and results ==
Date time, TV	Rank^{#}	Opponent^{#}	Result	Record	Site city, state
Regular season
November 20, 2005*; 2:00 p.m., ESPN Plus		Chicago State	W 81–52	1–0	Value City Arena (12,062); Columbus, OH
November 22, 2005*; 8:00 p.m., ESPNU		Butler	W 79–69 ^{OT}	2–0	Value City Arena (12,915); Columbus, OH
November 28, 2005*; 7:30 p.m., ESPN2		Virginia Tech	W 69–56	3–0	Value City Arena (13,218); Columbus, OH
December 10, 2005*; 2:00 p.m., ESPN		at Saint Joseph's	W 81–74	4–0	The Palestra (7,241); Philadelphia, PA
December 12, 2005*; 8:00 p.m., ESPN Plus		Norfolk State	W 92–59	5–0	Value City Arena (12,406); Columbus, OH
December 14, 2005*; 8:00 p.m., ESPN Plus		Belmont	W 85–75	6–0	Value City Arena (12,940); Columbus, OH
December 17, 2005*; 8:00 p.m., ESPN2		vs. Iowa State	W 70–67	7–0	Wells Fargo Arena (12,500); Des Moines, IA
December 23, 2005*; 8:00 p.m., ESPN Plus	No. 24	Tennessee State	W 74–65	8–0	Value City Arena (13,598); Columbus, OH
December 28, 2005; 8:00 p.m., ESPN Plus	No. 21	Gardner–Webb	W 87–58	9–0	Value City Arena (13,928); Columbus, OH
December 31, 2005*; 1:00 p.m., ESPNU	No. 21	LSU	W 78–76	10–0	Value City Arena (16,136); Columbus, OH
January 5, 2006; 8:00 p.m., ESPN Plus/YES	No. 18	Penn State	W 104–69	11–0 (1–0)	Value City Arena (14,709); Columbus, OH
January 7, 2006; 4:00 p.m., CBS	No. 18	at No. 16 Indiana	L 79–81	11–1 (1–1)	Assembly Hall (17,278); Bloomington, IN
January 11, 2006*; 8:00 p.m., ESPN Plus	No. 19	at Purdue	W 80–64	12–1 (2–1)	Mackey Arena (10,521); West Lafayette, IN
January 15, 2006; 4:30 p.m., CBS	No. 19	No. 14 Michigan State	L 59–62 ^{2OT}	12–2 (2–2)	Value City Arena (18,500); Columbus, OH
January 18, 2006; 8:30 p.m., ESPN2	No. 19	No. 15 Wisconsin	W 77–67	13–2 (3–2)	Value City Arena (16,127); Columbus, OH
January 21, 2006; 12:00 p.m., ESPN Plus	No. 19	at Penn State	W 75–64	14–2 (4–2)	Bryce Jordan Center (9,495); University Park, PA
January 28, 2006; 8:00 p.m., ESPN Plus	No. 16	at Iowa	L 62–67	14–3 (4–3)	Carver-Hawkeye Arena (15,500); Iowa City, IA
January 30, 2006*; 8:00 p.m., ESPN Plus	No. 16	Florida A&M	W 95–53	15–3	Value City Arena (13,347); Columbus, OH
February 4, 2006; 3:00 p.m., ESPN Plus	No. 20	Minnesota	W 67–53	16–3 (5–3)	Value City Arena (17,736); Columbus, OH
February 9, 2006; 7:00 p.m., ESPN	No. 19	at No. 22 Michigan	W 94–85	17–3 (6–3)	Crisler Center (12,788); Ann Arbor, MI
February 12, 2006; 1:00 p.m., CBS	No. 19	No. 10 Illinois	W 69–53	18–3 (7–3)	Value City Arena (18,500); Columbus, OH
February 15, 2006; 8:00 p.m., ESPN Plus	No. 12	at Wisconsin	L 73–78	18–4 (7–4)	Kohl Center (17,142); Madison, WI
February 18, 2006; 12:00 p.m., ESPN Plus	No. 12	Northwestern	W 61–52	19–4 (8–4)	Value City Arena (18,500); Columbia, OH
February 22, 2006; 8:00 p.m., ESPN Plus	No. 13	at No. 18 Michigan State	W 79–68	20–4 (9–4)	Breslin Student Events Center (14,759); East Lansing, MI
February 25, 2006; 1:30 p.m., CBS	No. 13	Michigan	W 64–54	21–4 (10–4)	Value City Arena (18,500); Columbus, OH
March 1, 2006; 8:00 p.m., ESPN Plus	No. 9	at Northwestern	W 56–53	22–4 (11–4)	Welsh-Ryan Arena (5,253); Evanston, IL
March 5, 2006; 12:00 p.m., ESPN Plus	No. 9	Purdue	W 76–57	23–4 (12–4)	Value City Arena (18,500); Columbus, OH
Big Ten tournament
March 10, 2006; 12:00 p.m., ESPN	(1) No. 7	vs. (8) Penn State; Quarterfinals	W 63–56	24–4	Bankers Life Fieldhouse (18,730); Indianapolis, IN
March 11, 2006; 4:00 p.m., CBS	(1) No. 7	vs. (5) Indiana; Semifinals	W 52–51	25–4	Bankers Life Fieldhouse (18,730); Indianapolis, IN
March 12, 2006; 3:30 p.m., CBS	(1) No. 7	vs. (2) No. 20 Iowa; Championship	L 60–67	25–5	Bankers Life Fieldhouse (17,591); Indianapolis, IN
NCAA tournament
March 17, 2006*; 12:15 p.m., CBS	(2 M) No. 6	vs. (15 M) Davidson; First Round	W 70–62	26–5	University of Dayton Arena (12,945); Dayton, OH
March 19, 2006*; 4:50 p.m., CBS	(2 M) No. 6	vs. (7 M) No. 23 Georgetown; Second Round	L 52–70	26–6	University of Dayton Arena (12,945); Dayton, OH
*Non-conference game. ^{#}Rankings from AP Poll. (#) Tournament seedings in parentheses. All times are in Eastern Time.
