= 2005–06 Illinois Fighting Illini men's basketball team =

American college basketball season

2005–06 Illinois Fighting Illini men's basketball

NCAA tournament, Round of 32
- Conference: Big Ten Conference

Ranking
- Coaches: No. 17
- AP: No. 13
- Record: 26–7 (11–5 Big Ten)
- Head coach: Bruce Weber (3rd season)
- Assistant coaches: Wayne McClain (5th season); Jay Price (3rd season); Tracy Webster (2nd season)
- MVP: Dee Brown
- Captains: Dee Brown; James Augustine; Brian Randle
- Home arena: Assembly Hall

2005–06 Big Ten Conference men's basketball standings
	Conf.				Overall
Team	W		L	PCT	W		L	PCT
No. 6 Ohio State	12	–	4	.750	26	–	6	.813
No. 15 Iowa †	11	–	5	.688	25	–	9	.735
No. 13 Illinois	11	–	5	.688	26	–	7	.788
Wisconsin	9	–	7	.563	19	–	12	.613
Indiana	9	–	7	.563	19	–	12	.613
Michigan State	8	–	8	.500	22	–	12	.647
Michigan	8	–	8	.500	22	–	11	.667
Penn State	6	–	10	.375	15	–	15	.500
Northwestern	6	–	10	.375	14	–	15	.483
Minnesota	5	–	11	.313	16	–	15	.516
Purdue	3	–	13	.188	9	–	19	.321
† 2006 Big Ten tournament winner As of March 14, 2006; Rankings from AP Poll

The 2005–06 Illinois Fighting Illini men's basketball team represented University of Illinois at Urbana–Champaign in the 2005–06 NCAA Division I men's basketball season. This was head coach Bruce Weber's third season at Illinois. The team finished with 11–5 conference and 26–7 overall records. The Illini lost in its first game of the Big Ten tournament and were eliminated in the second round of the NCAA tournament.

== Season ==
=== Overview ===
With the departure of junior Deron Williams and senior Luther Head to the NBA draft, returning seniors Dee Brown and James Augustine led Illinois back to the NCAA tournament. Brown took over the helm of the offense at point guard, a role he had played in high school. As in the previous year, Illinois relied heavily upon three-point shooting, but with more of an emphasis upon the post play of James Augustine.

=== Roster ===
2005–06 Illinois Fighting Illini men's basketball team
Players
Coaches

Pos.	#	Name	Height	Weight	Year	Previous school	Hometown
G	1	Trent Meacham (redshirt)	6 ft 2 in (1.88 m)	195 lb (88 kg)	So	Centennial High School/University of Dayton	Champaign, IL
G	2	Chris Hicks (W)	6 ft 2 in (1.88 m)	195 lb (88 kg)	So	Whitney Young High School	Chicago, IL
G	3	Chester Frazier	6 ft 2 in (1.88 m)	195 lb (88 kg)	Fr	Lake Clifton Eastern High School	Baltimore, MD
G	11	Dee Brown (C)	6 ft 0 in (1.83 m)	185 lb (84 kg)	Sr	Proviso East High School	Maywood, IL
G	25	Calvin Brock	6 ft 5 in (1.96 m)	200 lb (91 kg)	RS Fr	Simeon High School	Chicago, IL
G	31	Jamar Smith	6 ft 3 in (1.91 m)	185 lb (84 kg)	Fr	Richwoods High School	Peoria, IL
G	33	Rich McBride	6 ft 3 in (1.91 m)	205 lb (93 kg)	Jr	Lanphier High School	Springfield, IL
F	34	C.J. Jackson (redshirt)	6 ft 8 in (2.03 m)	265 lb (120 kg)	Fr	Tri-County High School	Buena Vista, GA
F	40	James Augustine (C)	6 ft 10 in (2.08 m)	235 lb (107 kg)	Sr	Lincoln-Way Central High School	Mokena, IL
F	41	Warren Carter	6 ft 8 in (2.03 m)	220 lb (100 kg)	Jr	Lake Highlands High School	Dallas, TX
F	42	Brian Randle (C)	6 ft 8 in (2.03 m)	220 lb (100 kg)	RS So	Notre Dame High School	East Peoria, IL
F	44	Marcus Arnold	6 ft 8 in (2.03 m)	245 lb (111 kg)	RS Jr	Morgan Park High School	Chicago, IL
C	55	Shaun Pruitt	6 ft 10 in (2.08 m)	245 lb (111 kg)	So	West Aurora High School	Aurora, IL

Head coach

- Bruce Weber (Wisconsin-Milwaukee)

Assistant coach(es)

- Wayne McClain (Illinois State)
- Jay Price (Kansas)
- Tracy Webster (Wisconsin)

Legend

- (C) Team captain
- (S) Suspended
- (I) Ineligible
- (W) Walk-on
- Injured
- Current redshirt

Roster

=== Depth chart ===
Pos.	Starting 5	Bench
C	Shaun Pruitt
PF	James Augustine
SF	Brian Randle
SG	Rich McBride
PG	Dee Brown

== Schedule ==
Date time, TV	Rank^{#}	Opponent^{#}	Result	Record	Site (attendance) city, state
Exhibition
Thu, Nov 3, 2005*; 7:00 pm	No. 17	Illinois Wesleyan	W 82–60		Assembly Hall (16,618); Champaign, IL
Wed, Nov 9, 2005*; 7:00 pm	No. 17	Quincy	W 78–52		Assembly Hall (16,618); Champaign, IL
Non-Conference regular season
Fri, Nov 18, 2005*; 7:00 pm, ESPN Plus	No. 17	South Dakota State	W 90–65	1–0	Assembly Hall (16,618); Champaign, IL
Sun, Nov 20, 2005*; 4:00 pm	No. 17	Texas-Pan American	W 71–59	2–0	Assembly Hall (16,618); Champaign, IL
Tue, Nov 22, 2005*; 7:00 pm, ESPN Plus	No. 15	Texas Southern	W 93–59	3–0	Assembly Hall (16,618); Champaign, IL
Fri, Nov 25, 2005*; 7:30 pm, CSTV	No. 15	vs. Wichita State; South Padre Island Invitational	W 55–54	4–0	South Padre Island Convention Centre (1,500); South Padre Island, TX
Sat, Nov 26, 2005*; 7:30 pm, CSTV	No. 15	vs. Rutgers; South Padre Island Invitational	W 77–57	5–0	South Padre Island Convention Centre (1,700); South Padre Island, TX
Tue, Nov 29, 2005*; 8:00 pm, ESPN	No. 12	at North Carolina	W 68–64	6–0	Dean Smith Center (21,273); Chapel Hill, NC
Sat, Dec 3, 2005*; 1:00 pm, ESPN Plus	No. 12	vs. Xavier	W 65–62	7–0	United Center (19,833); Chicago, IL
Mon, Dec 5, 2005*; 7:00 pm, ESPN Plus	No. 11	Little Rock	W 75–49	8–0	Assembly Hall (16,618); Champaign, IL
Thu, Dec 8, 2005*; 8:00 pm, ESPN	No. 11	Georgetown	W 58–48	9–0	Assembly Hall (16,618); Champaign, IL
Sat, Dec 10, 2005*; 7:00 pm, FSN	No. 11	at Oregon	W 89–59	10–0	Rose Garden (15,109); Portland, OR
Sun, Dec 18, 2005*; 4:00 pm	No. 9	Coppin State	W 61–42	11–0	Assembly Hall (16,618); Champaign, IL
Wed, Dec 21, 2005*; 6:00 pm, ESPN2	No. 6	vs. Missouri; Braggin' Rights	W 82–50	12–0	Savvis Center (22,153); St. Louis, MO
Wed, Dec 28, 2005*; 7:00 pm, ESPN Plus	No. 6	Southeast Missouri State	W 89–64	13–0	Assembly Hall (16,618); Champaign, IL
Fri, Dec 30, 2005*; 7:00 pm, ESPN Plus	No. 6	UT-Martin	W 84–46	14–0	Assembly Hall (16,618); Champaign, IL
Big Ten regular season
Thu, Jan 5, 2006; 8:00 pm, ESPN2	No. 6	No. 7 Michigan State	W 60–50	15–0 (1–0)	Assembly Hall (16,618); Champaign, IL
Sat, Jan 7, 2006; 1:00 pm, ESPN	No. 6	at Iowa; Illinois–Iowa men's basketball rivalry	L 48–63	15–1 (1–1)	Carver-Hawkeye Arena (15,500); Iowa City, IA
Sat, Jan 14, 2006; 3:30 pm, ESPN Plus	No. 7	Michigan	W 79–74	16–1 (2–1)	Assembly Hall (16,618); Champaign, IL
Tue, Jan 17, 2006; 6:00 pm, ESPN	No. 7	at No. 13 Indiana; Illinois–Indiana men's basketball rivalry	L 60–62	16–2 (2–2)	Assembly Hall (17,328); Bloomington, IN
Sat, Jan 21, 2006; 3:30 pm, ESPN Plus	No. 7	at Northwestern; Illinois–Northwestern men's basketball rivalry	W 58–47	17–2 (3–2)	Welsh-Ryan Arena (8,117); Evanston, IL
Wed, Jan 25, 2006; 8:00 pm, ESPN Plus	No. 8	Minnesota	W 77–53	18–2 (4–2)	Assembly Hall (16,618); Champaign, IL
Sat, Jan 28, 2006; 3:30 pm, ESPN Plus	No. 8	Purdue	W 76–58	19–2 (5–2)	Assembly Hall (16,618); Champaign, IL
Tue, Jan 31, 2006; 6:00 pm, ESPN	No. 6	at Wisconsin	W 66–51	20–2 (6–2)	Kohl Center (17,142); Madison, WI
Sat, Feb 4, 2006; 8:00 pm, ESPN Plus	No. 6	Penn State	L 65–66	20–3 (6–3)	Assembly Hall (16,618); Champaign, IL
Sun, Feb 12, 2006; 12:00 pm, CBS	No. 10	at No. 19 Ohio State	L 53–69	20–4 (6–4)	Value City Arena (18,500); Columbus, OH
Wed, Feb 15, 2006; 7:00 pm, ESPN Plus	No. 14	Northwestern; Rivalry	W 63–47	21–4 (7–4)	Assembly Hall (16,618); Champaign, IL
Sun, Feb 19, 2006; 2:30 pm, CBS	No. 14	Indiana; Rivalry	W 70–58	22–4 (8–4)	Assembly Hall (16,618); Champaign, IL
Tue, Feb 21, 2006; 6:00 pm, ESPN	No. 8	at Michigan	L 64–72	22–5 (8–5)	Crisler Arena (13,164); Ann Arbor, MI
Sat, Feb 25, 2006; 5:00 pm, ESPN	No. 8	No. 20 Iowa; Rivalry	W 71–59	23–5 (9–5)	Assembly Hall (16,618); Champaign, IL
Tue, Feb 28, 2006; 8:00 pm, ESPN	No. 10	at Minnesota	W 71–65	24–5 (10–5)	Williams Arena (13,022); Minneapolis, MN
Sat, Mar 4, 2006; 11:00 am, CBS	No. 10	at No. 25 Michigan State	W 75–68	25–5 (11–5)	Breslin Student Events Center (14,759); East Lansing, MI
Big Ten tournament
Fri, Mar 10, 2006; 8:10 pm, ESPN Plus	(3) No. 9	vs. (6) Michigan State; Quarterfinals	L 56–61	25–6	Conseco Fieldhouse (18,730); Indianapolis, IN
NCAA tournament
Thu, Mar 16, 2006; 7:35 pm, CBS	(4 W) No. 13	vs. (13 W) Air Force; First round	W 78–69	26–6	Cox Arena at Aztec Bowl (9,891); San Diego, CA
Sat, Mar 18, 2006; 4:30 pm, CBS	(4 W) No. 13	vs. (5 W) No. 17 Washington; Second round	L 64–67	26–7	Cox Arena at Aztec Bowl (10,687); San Diego, CA
*Non-conference game. ^{#}Rankings from AP Poll. (#) Tournament seedings in parentheses. All times are in Central Time.

== Season statistics ==
Legend
GP	Games played	GS	Games started	Avg	Average per game
FG	Field-goals made	FGA	Field-goal attempts	Off	Offensive rebounds
Def	Defensive rebounds	A	Assists	TO	Turnovers
Blk	Blocks	Stl	Steals	High	Team high

Individual Player Statistics
			Minutes		Scoring		Total FGs			3-point FGs			Free-Throws			Rebounds							
Player	GP	GS	Tot	Avg	Pts	Avg	FG	FGA	Pct	3FG	3FA	Pct	FT	FTA	Pct	Off	Def	Tot	Avg	A	TO	Blk	Stl
Brown, Dee	33	33	1183	35.8	470	14.2	157	437	.359	78	243	.321	78	103	.757	15	87	102	3.1	191	94	1	53
Augustine, James	33	33	1079	32.7	448	13.6	174	279	.624	1	2	.500	99	152	.651	100	200	300	9.1	59	67	24	47
McBride, Rich	33	33	989	30.0	329	10.0	112	277	.404	83	206	.403	22	25	.880	5	55	60	1.8	70	47	0	24
Randle, Brian	32	32	855	26.7	272	8.5	109	210	.519	6	34	.176	48	81	.593	77	96	173	5.4	47	43	17	26
Smith, Jamar	32	0	613	19.2	255	8.0	85	181	.470	66	137	.482	19	27	.704	17	36	53	1.7	43	34	1	16
Pruitt, Shaun	33	33	641	19.4	203	6.2	86	164	.524	0	0	.000	31	64	.484	70	99	169	5.1	15	39	15	13
Carter, Warren	32	1	395	12.3	154	4.8	58	126	.460	1	6	.167	37	55	.673	35	53	88	2.8	15	16	9	6
Arnold, Marcus	32	0	354	11.1	113	3.5	47	102	.461	0	0	.000	19	34	.559	32	44	76	2.4	2	21	9	7
Brock, Calvin	17	0	109	6.4	23	1.4	8	24	.333	1	6	.167	6	15	.400	5	22	27	1.6	7	8	1	4
Frazier, Chester	27	0	363	13.4	34	1.3	10	48	.208	5	32	.156	9	18	.500	8	37	45	1.7	50	21	2	7
Hicks, Chris	11	0	19	1.7	10	0.9	2	5	.400	0	2	.000	6	8	.750	0	1	1	0.1	1	0	0	0
Team																159	388	547			0		
Total	33		6600		2311	70.0	848	1853	.458	241	668	.361	374	582	.643	403	776	1179	35.7	500	406	79	203
Opponents	33		6600		1937	58.7	670	1656	.405	170	536	.317	427	615	.694	306	678	984	29.8	338	464	78	179

== Team players drafted into the NBA ==
Year	Player	NBA club	Round	Pick
2006	James Augustine	Orlando Magic	2	41
2006	Dee Brown	Utah Jazz	2	46

== Awards and honors ==
Dee Brown was named to the Consensus All-American 2nd Team, the Associated Press 2nd team, the United States Basketball Writers Association 2nd team and the National Association of Basketball Coaches 2nd team for the 2005–06 season.
