= 2005–06 Michigan Wolverines men's basketball team =

American college basketball season

2005–06 Michigan Wolverines men's basketball

NIT, Runner Up
- Conference: Big Ten Conference
- Record: 22–11 (8–8 Big Ten)
- Head coach: Tommy Amaker (5th season)
- Assistant coaches: Chuck Swenson; Mike Jackson; Andrew Moore
- MVP: Daniel Horton
- Captains: Lester Abram; Graham Brown; Sherrod Harrell

2005–06 Big Ten Conference men's basketball standings
	Conf.				Overall
Team	W		L	PCT	W		L	PCT
No. 6 Ohio State	12	–	4	.750	26	–	6	.813
No. 15 Iowa †	11	–	5	.688	25	–	9	.735
No. 13 Illinois	11	–	5	.688	26	–	7	.788
Wisconsin	9	–	7	.563	19	–	12	.613
Indiana	9	–	7	.563	19	–	12	.613
Michigan State	8	–	8	.500	22	–	12	.647
Michigan	8	–	8	.500	22	–	11	.667
Penn State	6	–	10	.375	15	–	15	.500
Northwestern	6	–	10	.375	14	–	15	.483
Minnesota	5	–	11	.313	16	–	15	.516
Purdue	3	–	13	.188	9	–	19	.321
† 2006 Big Ten tournament winner As of March 14, 2006; Rankings from AP Poll

The 2005-06 Michigan Wolverines men's basketball team represented the University of Michigan in intercollegiate college basketball during the 2005-06 season. The team played its home games in the Crisler Arena in Ann Arbor, Michigan, and was a member of the Big Ten Conference. Under the direction of head coach Tommy Amaker, the team finished tied for sixth in the Big Ten Conference. The team earned a seventh seed and lost in the first round of the 2006 Big Ten Conference men's basketball tournament. The team earned an invitation to the 2006 National Invitation Tournament. The team was ranked as the 21st best team in the January 31, 2006 Associated Press Top Twenty-Five Poll but fell out of the poll two weeks later, and also ended the season unranked in the final USA Today/CNN Poll. The team had a 3–7 record against ranked opponents, with its victories coming against #25 Michigan State 72–67 on January 25, 2006 at Crisler Arena, #23 Wisconsin 85–76 on January 28, 2006 at Crisler Arena and #8 Illinois 72–64 on February 21, 2006 at Crisler Arena.

Lester Abram, Graham Brown, and Sherrod Harrell served as team co-captains, and Daniel Horton earned team MVP honors. The team's leading scorers were Horton (581 points), Courtney Sims (360 points) and Dion Harris (343 points). The leading rebounders were Graham Brown (240), Courtney Sims (189) and Chris Hunter (115).

Courtney Sims won the Big Ten Conference statistical championship for field goal percentage with a 63.3% mark in all of Michigan's games. Daniel Horton set the current Big Ten Conference single-season free throw percentage record of 97.8 (89 of 91) for conference games. This, of course, led the conference for the conference season as did his 90.1% mark for all games. The team set the current school single-season record with 200 blocked shots in 34 games surpassing the total of 193 set 36 games in 1993.

In the 2006 Big Ten Conference men's basketball tournament at the Conseco Fieldhouse from March 9–12, Michigan was seeded seventh. In the first round they lost to number 10 Minnesota 59–55.

On March 16, 2006, Michigan defeated nine seeded Texas-El Paso 82–67 at Crisler Arena in the first round of the 2006 National Invitation Tournament. Then, Michigan defeated five seeded Notre Dame 87–84 in double overtime and three seeded Miami 71–65 on March 20 and March 22 at Crisler Arena, respectively. At the final four in New York City at Madison Square Garden, the team defeated five seeded Old Dominion 66–43 in the semifinals on March 28 before losing to three seeded South Carolina 76–64 in the championship on March 30.

== Schedule and results ==
Date time, TV	Rank^{#}	Opponent^{#}	Result	Record	Site city, state
Regular season
Nov 18, 2005*; 7:00 p.m.		Central Michigan	W 87–60	1–0	Crisler Arena (11,484); Ann Arbor, Michigan
Nov 22, 2005*; 7:00 p.m., NESN		at Boston University	W 51–46	2–0	Agganis Arena (4,750); Boston, Massachusetts
Nov 26, 2005*; 2:00 p.m.		Butler	W 78–74	3–0	Crisler Arena (9,513); Ann Arbor, Michigan
Nov 29, 2005*; 9:30 p.m., ESPN2		Miami; ACC–Big Ten Challenge	W 74–53	4–0	Crisler Arena (8,257); Ann Arbor, Michigan
Dec 3, 2005*; 2:00 p.m., ESPN2		at Notre Dame	W 71–67	5–0	Joyce Center (11,418); South Bend, Indiana
Dec 7, 2005*; 7:00 p.m.		Delaware State	W 69–49	6–0	Crisler Arena (5,508); Ann Arbor, Michigan
Dec 10, 2005*; 2:00 p.m., ESPN2		at South Florida	W 68–47	7–0	SunDome (5,688); Tampa, Florida
Dec 17, 2005*; 12:00 p.m., ESPN		No. 14 UCLA	L 61–68	7–1	Crisler Arena (13,751); Ann Arbor, Michigan
Dec 22, 2005*; 7:00 p.m., ESPN Plus		Miami (OH)	W 87–80	8–1	Crisler Arena (10,073); Ann Arbor, Michigan
Dec 28, 2005*; 6:00 p.m.		Coppin State	W 81–53	9–1	Crisler Arena (10,017); Ann Arbor, Michigan
Dec 31, 2006*; 2:00 p.m.		Chicago State	W 86–69	10–1	Crisler Arena (10,148); Ann Arbor, Michigan
Jan 3, 2006; 6:00 p.m., ESPNU		at No. 16 Indiana	L 63–70	10–2 (0–1)	Assembly Hall (13,619); Bloomington, Indiana
Jan 7, 2006; 12:00 p.m., ESPNU		Purdue	W 68–65	11–2 (1–1)	Crisler Arena (10,947); Ann Arbor, Michigan
Jan 14, 2006; 4:30 p.m., ESPN Plus		at No. 7 Illinois	L 74–79	11–3 (1–2)	Assembly Hall (16,618); Champaign, Illinois
Jan 18, 2006; 8:30 p.m., ESPNU		Northwestern	W 68–51	12–3 (2–2)	Crisler Arena (10,123); Ann Arbor, Michigan
Jan 21, 2006; 8:00 p.m., ESPN Plus		at Minnesota	W 71–55	13–3 (3–2)	Williams Arena (13,112); Minneapolis, Minnesota
Jan 25, 2006; 8:00 p.m., ESPNU		No. 11 Michigan State	W 72–67	14–3 (4–2)	Crisler Arena (13,751); Ann Arbor, Michigan
Jan. 28, 2006; 2:30 p.m., ESPN Plus		No. 23 Wisconsin	W 85–76	15–3 (5–2)	Crisler Arena (13,751); Ann Arbor, Michigan
Feb 1, 2006; 8:00 p.m., ESPN Plus	No. 21	at Penn State	W 71–65	16–3 (6–2)	Bryce Jordan Center (6,509); State College, Pennsylvania
Feb 4, 2006; 5:00 p.m., ESPN Plus	No. 21	at No. 23 Iowa	L 66–94	16–4 (6–3)	Carver–Hawkeye Arena (15,500); Iowa City, Iowa
Feb 9, 2006; 7:00 p.m., ESPN	No. 22	No. 19 Ohio State	L 85–94	16–5 (6–4)	Crisler Arena (12,788); Ann Arbor, Michigan
Feb 11, 2006; 12:00 p.m., ESPNU	No. 22	at Purdue	L 70–84	16–6 (6–5)	Mackey Arena (13,803); West Lafayette, Indiana
Feb 15, 2006; 7:00 p.m., ESPN Plus		Minnesota	W 72–50	17–6 (7–5)	Crisler Arena (11,118); Ann Arbor, Michigan
Feb 18, 2006; 4:00 p.m., ESPN		at No. 16 Michigan State	L 71–90	17–7 (7–6)	Breslin Center (14,759); East Lansing, Michigan
Feb 21, 2006; 7:00 p.m., ESPN		No. 8 Illinois	W 72–64	18–7 (8–6)	Crisler Arena (13,164); Ann Arbor, Michigan
Feb 25, 2006; 1:30 p.m., CBS		at No. 13 Ohio State	L 54–64	18–8 (8–7)	Value City Arena (12,100); Columbus, Ohio
Mar 4, 2006; 2:30 p.m., ESPN Plus		Indiana	L 67–69	18–9 (8–8)	Crisler Arena (13,751); Ann Arbor, Michigan
Big Ten Tournament
Mar 9, 2006; 2:00 p.m., ESPN2	(7)	vs. (10) Minnesota; First round	L 55–59	18–10	Conseco Fieldhouse (16,982); Indianapolis, Indiana
NIT
Mar 16, 2006*; 7:00 p.m.	(1)	(9) UTEP; First round	W 82–67	19–10	Crisler Arena (4,400); Ann Arbor, Michigan
Mar 20, 2006*; 7:00 p.m., ESPN	(1)	(5) Notre Dame; Second round	W 87–84 ^{2OT}	20–10	Crisler Arena (8,554); Ann Arbor, Michigan
Mar 22, 2006*; 7:00 p.m., ESPN2	(1)	(3) Miami; Quarterfinals	W 71–65	21–10	Crisler Arena (8,817); Ann Arbor, Michigan
Mar 28, 2006*; 7:00 p.m., ESPN2	(1)	vs. (5) Old Dominion; Semifinals	W 66–43	22–10	Madison Square Garden (7,473); New York, New York
Mar 30, 2006*; 7:00 p.m., ESPN	(1)	vs. (3) South Carolina; Championship	L 64–76	22–11	Madison Square Garden (6,130); New York, New York
*Non-conference game. ^{#}Rankings from AP Poll. (#) Tournament seedings in parentheses. All times are in Eastern Time.

== Rankings ==
Ranking movements Legend: ██ Increase in ranking ██ Decrease in ranking
	Week																		
Poll	Pre	1	2	3	4	5	6	7	8	9	10	11	12	13	14	15	16	17	Final
AP Poll													21	22					

== See also ==
- Michigan Wolverines men's basketball
- 2006 National Invitation Tournament
- NIT all-time team records
- NIT bids by school and conference
- NIT championships and semifinal appearances
