= 2005–06 Wisconsin Badgers men's basketball team =

American college basketball season

2005–06 Wisconsin Badgers men's basketball

2005 Paradise Jam tournament Champions

2006 NCAA Division I men's basketball tournament, Round of 64
- Conference: Big Ten Conference
- Record: 19–12 (9–7 Big Ten)
- Head coach: Bo Ryan
- Assistant coaches: Greg Gard; Gary Close; Howard Moore
- Home arena: Kohl Center

2005–06 Big Ten Conference men's basketball standings
| | Conf. | | | | Overall |
| Team | W | | L | PCT | W | | L | PCT |
|---|---|---|---|---|---|---|---|---|
| No. 6 Ohio State | 12 | – | 4 | .750 | 26 | – | 6 | .813 |
| No. 15 Iowa † | 11 | – | 5 | .688 | 25 | – | 9 | .735 |
| No. 13 Illinois | 11 | – | 5 | .688 | 26 | – | 7 | .788 |
| Wisconsin | 9 | – | 7 | .563 | 19 | – | 12 | .613 |
| Indiana | 9 | – | 7 | .563 | 19 | – | 12 | .613 |
| Michigan State | 8 | – | 8 | .500 | 22 | – | 12 | .647 |
| Michigan | 8 | – | 8 | .500 | 22 | – | 11 | .667 |
| Penn State | 6 | – | 10 | .375 | 15 | – | 15 | .500 |
| Northwestern | 6 | – | 10 | .375 | 14 | – | 15 | .483 |
| Minnesota | 5 | – | 11 | .313 | 16 | – | 15 | .516 |
| Purdue | 3 | – | 13 | .188 | 9 | – | 19 | .321 |
† 2006 Big Ten tournament winner As of March 14, 2006; Rankings from AP Poll

The 2005–06 Wisconsin Badgers men's basketball team represented University of Wisconsin–Madison. The head coach was Bo Ryan, coaching his fifth season with the Badgers. The team played its home games at the Kohl Center in Madison, Wisconsin as a member of the Big Ten Conference.

== Season Notes ==
This Wisconsin team began the season with a 14–2 record, including 4–0 in Big Ten play. The Badgers rose to No. 15 in the AP Poll and No. 13 in the Coaches Poll. They then went 5–8 over their final 13 regular-season games before losing in the first round of the Big Ten tournament and the NCAA tournament, finishing the season with a 19–12 record.

The beginning of the end came in the 17th game of the season with a loss at Ohio State on January 18, 2006. This marked the first game Wisconsin played without freshman Marcus Landry and sophomore Greg Stiemsma, who were each ruled academically ineligible for the second semester. Then the next game, Wisconsin had their 27-game home non-conference winning streak snapped in a shocking upset, as North Dakota State won, 62–55, at the Kohl Center.

It was an unfortunate blow as both Landry and Stiemsma had become key contributors. Juniors Alando Tucker and Kammron Taylor led the team in scoring, with 19.0 ppg and 14.2 ppg, respectively. Brian Butch stepped up as a sophomore to average 9.9 ppg.

== Awards ==
All-Big Ten by Media

- Alando Tucker - 1st team
- Kammron Taylor - Honorable mention

All-Big Ten by Coaches

- Alando Tucker - 1st team
- Kammron Taylor - Honorable mention
- Joe Krabbenhoft - All-Freshman team

== Roster ==
2005–06 Wisconsin Badgers men's basketball team
Players
Coaches

| Pos. | # | Name | Height | Weight | Year | Hometown |
|---|---|---|---|---|---|---|
| F | 1 | Marcus Landry | 6 ft 7 in (2.01 m) | 215 lb (98 kg) | Fr | Milwaukee, WI |
| G | 2 | Mickey Perry (redshirt) | 6 ft 2 in (1.88 m) | 175 lb (79 kg) | Fr | Maywood, IL |
| G/F | 4 | Ray Nixon | 6 ft 7 in (2.01 m) | 220 lb (100 kg) | Sr | Milwaukee, WI |
| F/C | 5 | Jason Chappell | 6 ft 10 in (2.08 m) | 240 lb (109 kg) | RS Jr | New Berlin, WI |
| G | 10 | Devin Barry (W) | 6 ft 1 in (1.85 m) | 175 lb (79 kg) | Fr | Janesville, WI |
| G | 14 | Tanner Bronson | 5 ft 11 in (1.8 m) | 160 lb (73 kg) | So | Glendale, WI |
| G/F | 21 | Morris Cain (W) | 6 ft 5 in (1.96 m) | 195 lb (88 kg) | Fr | Glendale, WI |
| G | 22 | Michael Flowers | 6 ft 2 in (1.88 m) | 185 lb (84 kg) | So | Madison, WI |
| G | 23 | Kammron Taylor | 6 ft 2 in (1.88 m) | 175 lb (79 kg) | Jr | Minneapolis, MN |
| F/C | 32 | Brian Butch | 6 ft 11 in (2.11 m) | 240 lb (109 kg) | RS So | Appleton, WI |
| G/F | 33 | DeAaron Williams | 6 ft 4 in (1.93 m) | 190 lb (86 kg) | RS Fr | Peoria, IL |
| F/C | 34 | Greg Stiemsma | 6 ft 11 in (2.11 m) | 245 lb (111 kg) | So | Randolph, WI |
| F | 42 | Alando Tucker | 6 ft 6 in (1.98 m) | 210 lb (95 kg) | RS Jr | Lockport, IL |
| F | 43 | Kevin Gullikson (W) | 6 ft 7 in (2.01 m) | 210 lb (95 kg) | Fr | Stillwater, MN |
| G/F | 45 | Joe Krabbenhoft | 6 ft 7 in (2.01 m) | 217 lb (98 kg) | Fr | Sioux Falls, SD |

Head coach

- Bo Ryan (Wilkes)

Assistant coach(es)

- Greg Gard (UW-Platteville)
- Gary Close (Arizona State)
- Howard Moore (Wisconsin)

Legend

- (C) Team captain
- (S) Suspended
- (I) Ineligible
- (W) Walk-on
- Injured
- Current redshirt

Roster
Last update: 2014-1-5

== Schedule ==
| Date time, TV | Rank^{#} | Opponent^{#} | Result | Record | Site city, state |
Regular Season
| 11/18/2005*; 7:30 pm | | vs. Norfolk State; Paradise Jam tournament | W 81–51 | 1–0 | Sports and Fitness Center; St. Thomas, VI |
| 11/19/2005*; 7:30 pm | | vs. Eastern Kentucky; Paradise Jam Tournament | W 95–89 | 2–0 | Sports and Fitness Center; St. Thomas, VI |
| 11/21/2005*; 7:30 pm, FSN | | vs. Old Dominion; Paradise Jam Tournament | W 84–81 | 3–0 | Sports and Fitness Center; St. Thomas, VI |
| 11/26/2005*; 7:00 pm | | Coastal Carolina | W 92–54 | 4–0 | Kohl Center; Madison, WI |
| 11/29/2005*; 6:00 pm, ESPN | | at No. 22 Wake Forest; ACC–Big Ten Challenge | L 88–91 | 4–1 | LJVM Colisem; Winston-Salem, NC |
| 12/03/2005*; 1:00 pm | | Pepperdine | W 71–55 | 5–1 | Kohl Center; Madison, WI |
| 12/07/2005*; 7:00 pm, ESPN | | Green Bay | W 82–62 | 6–1 | Kohl Center; Madison, WI |
| 12/10/2005*; 12:00 pm, ESPN+ | | Marquette | W 77–63 | 7–1 | Kohl Center; Madison, WI |
| 12/12/2005*; 7:00 pm, WPT | | UNC Wilmington | W 54–51 | 8–1 | Kohl Center; Madison, WI |
| 12/15/2005*; 7:00 pm, ESPN | | Milwaukee | W 74–68 | 9–1 | Kohl Center; Madison, WI |
| 12/28/2005*; 7:00 pm, WPT | No. 24 | Louisiana Tech | W 78–52 | 10–1 | Kohl Center; Madison, WI |
| 12/31/2005*; 5:00 pm, ESPN | No. 24 | at Pittsburgh | L 64–73 | 10–2 | Petersen Events Center; Pittsburgh, PA |
| 1/05/2006; 7:00 pm, ESPN | | Iowa | W 66–52 | 11–2 (1–0) | Kohl Center; Madison, WI |
| 1/08/2006; 12:30 pm, CBS | | No. 7 Michigan State | W 82–63 | 12–2 (2–0) | Kohl Center; Madison, WI |
| 1/10/2006; 6:00 pm, ESPN | No. 21 | at Minnesota | W 64–62 | 13–2 (3–0) | Williams Arena; Minneapolis, MN |
| 1/14/2006; 1:32 pm, ESPN+ | No. 21 | Northwestern | W 68–52 | 14–2 (4–0) | Kohl Center; Madison, WI |
| 1/18/2006; 7:30 pm, ESPN2 | No. 15 | at No. 19 Ohio State | L 67–77 | 14–3 (4–1) | Value City Arena; Columbus, OH |
| 1/21/2006*; 11:15 am | No. 15 | North Dakota State | L 55–62 | 14–4 | Kohl Center; Madison, WI |
| 1/25/2006; 7:00 pm, ESPN | No. 23 | Penn State | W 72–43 | 15–4 (5–1) | Kohl Center; Madison, WI |
| 1/28/2006; 1:32 pm, ESPN+ | No. 23 | at Michigan | L 76–85 | 15–5 (5–2) | Crisler Arena; Ann Arbor, MI |
| 1/31/2006; 6:00 pm, ESPN | | No. 6 Illinois | L 51–66 | 15–6 (5–3) | Kohl Center; Madison, WI |
| 2/04/2006; 7:00 pm, ESPN | | at Purdue | L 62–70 | 15–7 (5–4) | Mackey Arena; West Lafayette, IN |
| 2/08/2006; 6:00 pm, ESPN | | No. 24 Indiana | W 72–54 | 16–7 (6–4) | Kohl Center; Madison, WI |
| 2/11/2006; 3:00 pm, ESPN2 | | at Penn State | W 82–62 | 17–7 (7–4) | Bryce Jordan Center; University Park, PA |
| 2/15/2006; 7:00 pm, ESPN | | No. 12 Ohio State | W 78–73 | 18–7 (8–4) | Kohl Center; Madison, WI |
| 2/23/2006; 8:00 pm, ESPN2 | | at Northwestern | L 51–62 | 18–8 (8–5) | Welsh-Ryan Arena; Evanston, IL |
| 2/26/2006; 1:00 pm, ESPN | | Minnesota | W 80–74 | 19–8 (9–5) | Kohl Center; Madison, WI |
| 3/02/2006; 6:00 pm, ESPN | | at No. 25 Michigan State | L 65–74 | 19–9 (9–6) | Breslin Center; East Lansing, MI |
| 3/04/2006; 3:40 pm, ESPN+ | | at Iowa | L 44–59 | 19–10 (9–7) | Carver–Hawkeye Arena; Iowa City, IA |
Big Ten tournament
| 3/10/2006; 1:30 pm, ESPN | | vs. Indiana; Big Ten tournament – quarterfinals | L 56–61 | 19–11 | Conseco Fieldhouse; Indianapolis, IN |
NCAA tournament
| 3/17/2006*; 11:30 am, CBS | (9) | vs. (8) Arizona; NCAA Tournament - First Round | L 75–94 | 19–12 | Wachovia Center; Philadelphia, PA |
*Non-conference game. ^{#}Rankings from AP Poll. (#) Tournament seedings in parentheses.
