= B. J. Armstrong =

American basketball executive and player (born 1967)

Sacramento Kings
- Title: Assistant general manager
- League: NBA

Personal information
- Born: September 9, 1967 (age 59) Detroit, Michigan, U.S.
- Listed height: 6 ft 2 in (1.88 m)
- Listed weight: 185 lb (84 kg)

Career information
- High school: Brother Rice (Bloomfield Hills, Michigan)
- College: Iowa (1985–1989)
- NBA draft: 1989: 1st round, 18th overall pick
- Drafted by: Chicago Bulls
- Playing career: 1989–2000
- Position: Point guard
- Number: 10, 11, 2

Career history
- 1989–1995: Chicago Bulls
- 1995–1997: Golden State Warriors
- 1997–1999: Charlotte Hornets
- 1999: Orlando Magic
- 1999–2000: Chicago Bulls

Career highlights
- 3× NBA champion (1991–1993); NBA All-Star (1994); 2× Second-team All-Big Ten (1988, 1989); No. 10 retired by Iowa Hawkeyes

Career NBA statistics
- Points: 7,320 (9.8 ppg)
- Rebounds: 1,321 (1.8 rpg)
- Assists: 2,479 (3.3 apg)
- Stats at NBA.com
- Stats at Basketball Reference
Medals
Men's basketball
Representing United States
Summer Universiade
Silver medal – second place	1987 Zagreb	National team

Benjamin Roy Armstrong Jr. (born September 9, 1967) is an American professional basketball executive and former professional basketball player who is the assistant general manager of the Sacramento Kings of the National Basketball Association (NBA). Armstrong won three National Basketball Association (NBA) championships during his career as a point guard for the Chicago Bulls.

== Early life ==
Armstrong was born in Detroit, Michigan, and attended Brother Rice High School in Bloomfield Township, Michigan. He graduated in 1985.

== Playing career ==
=== College career ===
Armstrong had an illustrious career at the University of Iowa as the Hawkeyes' all-time leader in assists with 517 upon graduation; and is currently ranked sixth all-time. He also ranked sixth on the school's all-time steals list (178) and fourth in total points (1,705). The 6-foot-2 guard shot .443 (136-of-307) from three-point range over his four-year career and averaged 18.6 points and 5.4 assists as a senior. Armstrong received his bachelor's degree from Iowa in May 1989.

=== National Basketball Association ===
==== Chicago Bulls ====
Selected by the Chicago Bulls in the first round of the 1989 NBA draft, the 6-foot-2-inch (1.88 m) Armstrong helped the team return to the Eastern Conference Finals after compiling 55 regular season victories in 1990.

In 1991, he helped them win their first NBA title against the Los Angeles Lakers after winning 61 games. In 1992, Armstrong averaged double-digit scoring while coming off the bench behind longtime starter John Paxson to help the Bulls win 67 games and their second straight title. In 1993, he locked down the starting job, contributing to a 57–25 record and the Bulls' third straight title. He also claimed the NBA's three-point field goal percentage crown with a mark of .453 on 63-for-139 shooting.

In 1994, he emerged as more of a leader in the wake of Michael Jordan's abrupt retirement, placing third on the team in scoring. He was voted a starter in the 1994 NBA All-Star Game, finished second in the NBA in three-point field goal percentage at .444 while leading the team to a 55–27 record and a second-round exit from the playoffs.

Armstrong finished third in scoring again in 1995 as the Bulls posted a 47–35 record, and with Jordan, Scottie Pippen and Toni Kukoč, led the team to the second round again.

==== Golden State Warriors ====
Armstrong was the first player chosen in the 1995 NBA expansion draft (via Toronto Raptors) but refused to report. He was traded by the Raptors to the Golden State Warriors in exchange for Carlos Rogers and 4 other players and played for the Warriors in 1996 and in 1997.

==== Charlotte Hornets ====
Four games into the 1997–98 season, Armstrong was acquired by the Charlotte Hornets for Tony Delk and Muggsy Bogues, playing 62 games that year. He also played 10 games for the Hornets in the 1999 season before being traded to the Los Angeles Lakers, alongside J.R. Reid and Glen Rice, for Elden Campbell and Eddie Jones. The Lakers immediately waived Armstrong, and he signed by the Orlando Magic in March of that year.

==== Orlando Magic ====
Armstrong was signed by the Orlando Magic in March of the 1998–99 NBA season.

==== Return to Chicago ====
On August 30, 1999, he was again signed by the Bulls and played the 1999–2000 season and retired at the end of the season, ending his career with the team that drafted him and with which he spent much of his playing career.

== Executive career ==
=== Sacramento Kings (2025–present) ===
On May 7, 2025, Armstrong became the assistant general manager of the Sacramento Kings under GM Scott Perry.

== Later endeavors ==
Armstrong stepped into Chicago's front office as a special assistant to Vice President of Basketball Operations Jerry Krause. Having replaced Paxson as the Bulls' starting point guard years before, Armstrong was himself replaced by Paxson as hire to the GM job in Chicago when Krause resigned in 2003. Armstrong remained with the organization as a scout for a couple of seasons, leaving in 2005.

Armstrong served as a basketball analyst for ESPN's NBA Fast Break series. Since 2006 he has also been employed by Wasserman Media Group, a sports marketing and representation group out of Los Angeles, California representing professional athletes and entertainers. He served as an agent for Derrick Rose, who was the first player selected in the 2008 NBA draft. He also served as an agent for Bismack Biyombo, Emmanuel Mudiay, Donatas Motiejūnas, JaVale McGee, Denzel Valentine, and Josh Jackson.

== NBA career statistics ==
Legend
GP	Games played	GS	Games started	MPG	Minutes per game
FG%	Field goal percentage	3P%	3-point field goal percentage	FT%	Free throw percentage
RPG	Rebounds per game	APG	Assists per game	SPG	Steals per game
BPG	Blocks per game	PPG	Points per game	**Bold**	Career high
†	Won an NBA championship	*	Led the league

=== Regular season ===
Year	Team	GP	GS	MPG	FG%	3P%	FT%	RPG	APG	SPG	BPG	PPG
1989–90	Chicago	81	0	15.9	.485	.500	.885	1.3	2.5	0.6	**0.1**	5.6
1990–91†	Chicago	**82**	0	21.1	.481	.500	.874	1.8	3.7	0.9	0.0	8.8
1991–92†	Chicago	**82**	3	22.9	.481	.402	.806	1.8	3.2	0.6	**0.1**	9.9
1992–93†	Chicago	**82**	74	30.4	.499	.453*	.861	1.8	4.0	0.8	**0.1**	12.3
1993–94	Chicago	**82***	**82***	**33.8**	.476	.444	.855	2.1	3.9	**1.0**	**0.1**	**14.8**
1994–95	Chicago	**82***	**82***	31.4	.468	.427	.884	**2.3**	3.0	**1.0**	**0.1**	14.0
1995–96	Golden State	**82**	64	27.6	.468	.473	.839	2.2	**4.9**	0.8	**0.1**	12.3
1996–97	Golden State	49	17	20.8	.453	.278	.861	1.5	2.6	0.5	0.0	7.9
1997–98	Golden State	4	0	14.8	.316	.000	.714	1.8	1.5	**1.0**	0.0	4.3
1997–98	Charlotte	62	0	12.5	**.510**	.265	.860	1.1	2.3	0.4	0.0	3.9
1998–99	Charlotte	10	1	17.8	.488	**.750**	**.900**	1.6	2.7	0.3	0.0	5.7
1998–99	Orlando	22	0	8.2	.422	.143	.818	1.0	1.5	0.4	0.0	2.2
1999–00	Chicago	27	18	21.6	.446	.448	.880	1.7	2.9	0.3	0.0	7.4
Career		747	341	23.8	.477	.425	.856	1.8	3.3	0.7	0.1	9.8
All-Star		1	1	22.0	.556	.500	–	1.0	4.0	0.0	0.0	11.0

=== Playoffs ===
Year	Team	GP	GS	MPG	FG%	3P%	FT%	RPG	APG	SPG	BPG	PPG
1990	Chicago	16	0	13.6	.339	.000	**.917**	1.3	1.8	0.6	0.0	4.0
1991†	Chicago	17	0	16.1	.500	**.600**	.800	1.6	2.5	**1.1**	**0.1**	5.5
1992†	Chicago	**22**	0	19.7	.453	.294	.789	1.1	2.1	0.6	0.0	7.3
1993†	Chicago	19	**19**	33.8	**.524**	.512	.909	1.5	**3.3**	1.0	**0.1**	11.4
1994	Chicago	10	10	**36.0**	.519	.583	.818	**2.4**	2.5	0.8	0.0	**15.3**
1995	Chicago	10	10	28.8	.456	.448	.818	1.8	2.7	0.6	0.0	10.3
1998	Charlotte	9	0	16.2	.381	.400	.750	1.1	2.0	0.7	0.0	4.1
1999	Orlando	2	0	1.5	.000	–	–	0.0	0.5	0.0	0.0	0.0
Career		105	39	22.5	.471	.451	.832	1.4	2.4	0.8	0.0	7.9

== See also ==
- List of National Basketball Association career 3-point field goal percentage leaders
