= 2005–06 Michigan State Spartans men's basketball team =

American college basketball season

2005–06 Michigan State Spartans men's basketball

NCAA tournament, first round
- Conference: Big Ten Conference
- Record: 22–12 (8–8 Big Ten)
- Head coach: Tom Izzo (11th season)
- Assistant coaches: Mark Montgomery (5th season); Dwayne Stephens (3rd season); Jim Boylen (1st season)
- Captains: Maurice Ager; Shannon Brown; Paul Davis; Delco Rowley
- Home arena: Breslin Center

2005–06 Big Ten Conference men's basketball standings
	Conf.				Overall
Team	W		L	PCT	W		L	PCT
No. 6 Ohio State	12	–	4	.750	26	–	6	.813
No. 15 Iowa †	11	–	5	.688	25	–	9	.735
No. 13 Illinois	11	–	5	.688	26	–	7	.788
Wisconsin	9	–	7	.563	19	–	12	.613
Indiana	9	–	7	.563	19	–	12	.613
Michigan State	8	–	8	.500	22	–	12	.647
Michigan	8	–	8	.500	22	–	11	.667
Penn State	6	–	10	.375	15	–	15	.500
Northwestern	6	–	10	.375	14	–	15	.483
Minnesota	5	–	11	.313	16	–	15	.516
Purdue	3	–	13	.188	9	–	19	.321
† 2006 Big Ten tournament winner As of March 14, 2006; Rankings from AP Poll

The 2005–06 Michigan State Spartans men's basketball team represented Michigan State University in the 2005–06 NCAA Division I men's basketball season. Their head coach was Tom Izzo, who was in his 11th year at Michigan State. The team played its home games at Breslin Center in East Lansing, Michigan, and competed in the Big Ten Conference. MSU finished the season with a record of 22–12, 8–8 in Big Ten play to finish in a tie for sixth place. As the No. 6 seed in the Big Ten tournament, they defeated Purdue and Illinois before losing to Iowa in the semifinals. They received an at-large bid to the NCAA tournament as the No. 6 seed in the Washington D.C. bracket, marking the school's ninth consecutive trip to the NCAA Tournament under Izzo. They lost in the First Round to eventual Final Four participant, George Mason.

== Previous season ==
The Spartans finished the 2004–05 season with a record of 26–7, 13–3 in Big Ten play to finish in second place. Michigan State received a No. 6 seed in the NCAA tournament, their eighth straight trip to the Tournament, and advanced to the Final Four, their fourth trip under Tom Izzo.

The Spartans lost Alan Anderson (13.2 points and 5.6 rebounds per game), Kelvin Torbert (9.5 points per game) and Chris Hill (8.8 points and 4.2 assists per game) to graduation following the season.

== Season summary ==
The Spartans were led by seniors Paul Davis (17.5 points and 9.1 rebounds per game) and Maurice Ager (19.3 points per game), as well as junior Shannon Brown (17.2 points per game).

The Spartans began the season ranked No. 4 in the country. They started by making a trip to Hawaii to participate in the Maui Classic. Before playing in the Classic, however, they played Hawaii and were shocked, losing 84–62. After beating host Chaminade in the Maui Classic, they played No. 8 Gonzaga led by Adam Morrison in the tournament semifinals. The game was an instant classic lasting into triple overtime where the Spartans fell 109–106. In the third place game, the Spartans defeated No. 9 Arizona. The Spartans won their remaining ten non-conference games, including a win over No. 6 Boston College in the Jimmy V Classic, to finish the non-conference schedule at 12–2 and ranked No. 7 in the country.

The Spartans began the Big Ten season with back-to-back losses to No. 6 Illinois and Wisconsin. They followed those up with wins over No. 9 Indiana, No. 19 Ohio State in double overtime, and No. 23 Iowa. However, Michigan State finished the conference season losing five of their last seven games. MSU finished the Big Ten regular season with a conference record of 8–8, 20–10 overall, and slipping out of the polls. In the Big Ten tournament, MSU defeated Purdue and No. 9 Illinois before losing to No. 20 Iowa in the semifinals.

The Spartans received an at-large bid as a No. 6 seed in the NCAA tournament, their ninth consecutive trip to the Tournament. In the Tournament, they lost to eventual Final Four Cinderella, No. 11-seeded George Mason, in the First Round.

Following the season, Shannon Brown declared for the NBA draft, leaving the Spartans one year prior to graduation, just the fourth player under Izzo to declare early.

== Roster ==
2005–06 Michigan State Spartans men's basketball team
Players
Coaches

Pos.	#	Name	Height	Weight	Year	Previous school	Hometown
F	10	Jason Aerts	6 ft 6 in (1.98 m)	205 lb (93 kg)	Sr	Aquinas College	Pentwater, Michigan
G	13	Maurice Ager	6 ft 5 in (1.96 m)	202 lb (92 kg)	Sr	Crockett Vocational Tech	Detroit, Michigan
G	3	Shannon Brown	6 ft 3 in (1.91 m)	205 lb (93 kg)	Jr	Proviso East H.S.	Maywood, Illinois
G	1	Brandon Darnton	6 ft 4 in (1.93 m)	170 lb (77 kg)	RS So	Harbor Springs H.S.	Harbor Springs, Michigan
C	40	Paul Davis	6 ft 11 in (2.11 m)	240 lb (109 kg)	Sr	Rochester H.S.	Rochester Hills, Michigan
G	15	DeMarcus Ducre	5 ft 10 in (1.78 m)	160 lb (73 kg)	Jr	Saginaw H.S.	Saginaw, Michigan
PF	41	Marquise Gray	6 ft 8 in (2.03 m)	228 lb (103 kg)	RS Fr	Beecher H.S.	Flint, Michigan
G	22	Anthony Hamo	6 ft 2 in (1.88 m)	210 lb (95 kg)	Sr	Powers Catholic	Flint, Michigan
F	43	Jacob Hannon	6 ft 5 in (1.96 m)	235 lb (107 kg)	RS So	Cody H.S.	Cody, Wyoming
C	00	Idong Ibok	6 ft 11 in (2.11 m)	255 lb (116 kg)	So	Montverde Academy	Montverde, Florida
SG	23	Maurice Joseph	6 ft 4 in (1.93 m)	180 lb (82 kg)	Fr	Champlain School	Saint-Lambert, Quebec
C	34	Drew Naymick	6 ft 10 in (2.08 m)	235 lb (107 kg)	Jr	North Muskegon H.S.	North Muskegon, Michigan
PG	11	Drew Neitzel	6 ft 0 in (1.83 m)	185 lb (84 kg)	So	Wyoming Park H.S.	Wyoming, Michigan
F	50	Delco Rowley	6 ft 8 in (2.03 m)	240 lb (109 kg)	RS Jr	Arlington H.S.	Indianapolis, Indiana
C	14	Goran Suton	6 ft 10 in (2.08 m)	238 lb (108 kg)	RS Fr	Everett H.S.	Lansing, Michigan
G	2	Bryan Tibaldi	6 ft 2 in (1.88 m)	170 lb (77 kg)	RS So	West H.S.	Traverse City, Michigan
F	20	Matt Trannon	6 ft 6 in (1.98 m)	227 lb (103 kg)	Sr	Northern H.S.	Flint, Michigan
PG	5	Travis Walton	6 ft 2 in (1.88 m)	—	Fr	Lima H.S.	Lima, Ohio

Head coach

- Tom Izzo (Northern Michigan)

Assistant coach(es)

- Mark Montgomery (Michigan State)
- Dwayne Stephens (Michigan State)
- Jim Boylen (Maine)

Legend

- (C) Team captain
- (S) Suspended
- (I) Ineligible
- (W) Walk-on
- Injured
- Current redshirt

Roster
Last update: 2016-07-11

== Schedule and results ==
Date time, TV	Rank^{#}	Opponent^{#}	Result	Record	Site city, state
Exhibition Games
Nov 7, 2005; 7:00 pm		Lake Superior State	W 107–73		Breslin Center; East Lansing, MI
Nov 12, 2005; 8:00 pm		Northern Michigan	W 77–58		Breslin Center; East Lansing, MI
Non-conference regular season
Nov 19, 2005*; 1:05 pm	No. 4	at Hawaii	L 62–84	0–1	Stan Sheriff Center; Honolulu, HI
Nov 21, 2005*; 9:30 am, ESPN2	No. 12	at Chaminade; EA Sports Maui Invitational	W 89–67	1–1	Lahaina Civic Center; Lahaina, HI
Nov 22, 2005*; 2:00 pm, ESPN2	No. 12	vs. No. 8 Gonzaga; EA Sports Maui Invitational semifinals	L 106–109 ^{3OT}	1–2	Lahaina Civic Center; Lahaina, HI
Nov 23, 2005*; 11:30 am, ESPN	No. 12	vs. No. 9 Arizona; EA Sports Maui Invitational third place game	W 74–71 ^{OT}	2–2	Lahaina Civic Center; Lahaina, HI
Nov 27, 2005*; 1:00 pm, ESPN Plus	No. 12	IPFW	W 84–73	3–2	Breslin Center; East Lansing, MI
Nov 30, 2005*	No. 13	Georgia Tech	W 88–86	4–2	Breslin Center; East Lansing, MI
Dec 3, 2005*	No. 13	vs. Arkansas-Little Rock	W 72–67	5–2	Van Andel Arena; Grand Rapids, MI
Dec 6, 2005*; 9:00 pm	No. 14	vs. No. 6 Boston College; Jimmy V Classic	W 77–70	6–2	Madison Square Garden; New York, NY
Dec 10, 2005*	No. 14	vs. Wichita State; Spartan Clash	W 83–64	7–2	Palace of Auburn Hills; Detroit, MI
Dec 16, 2005*	No. 12	Cleveland State	W 83–75	8–2	Breslin Center; East Lansing, MI
Dec 18, 2005*	No. 12	Florida International	W 85–58	9–2	Breslin Center; East Lansing, MI
Dec 21, 2005*	No. 10	Green Bay	W 98–69	10–2	Resch Center; Green Bay, WI
Dec 28, 2005*	No. 9	Tennessee Tech	W 80–63	11–2	Breslin Center; East Lansing, MI
Dec 31, 2005*	No. 9	Coppin State	W 78–54	12–2	Breslin Center; East Lansing, MI
Big Ten regular season
Jan 5, 2006	No. 7	Illinois	L 50–60	12–3 (0–1)	Assembly Hall; Champaign, IL
Jan 8, 2006	No. 7	Wisconsin	L 63–82	12–4 (0–2)	Kohl Center; Madison, WI
Jan 11, 2006	No. 14	No. 9 Indiana	W 87–73	13–4 (1–;2)	Breslin Center; East Lansing, MI
Jan 15, 2006	No. 14	No. 19 Ohio State	W 62–59 ^{2OT}	14–4 (2–2)	Value City Arena; Columbus, OH
Jan 21, 2006	No. 11	No. 23 Iowa	W 85–55	15–4 (3–2)	Breslin Center; East Lansing, MI
Jan 25, 2006	No. 11	Michigan; Rivalry	L 67–72	15–5 (3–3)	Crisler Arena; Ann Arbor, MI
Jan 28, 2006	No. 11	Penn State	W 69–60	16–5 (4–3)	Breslin Center; East Lansing, MI
Feb 4, 2006	No. 12	Northwestern	W 77–66	17–5 (5–3)	Welsh-Ryan Arena; Evanston, IL
Feb 8, 2006	No. 12	Purdue	W 77–52	18–5 (6–3)	Breslin Center; East Lansing, MI
Feb 11, 2006	No. 11	Minnesota	L 55–69	18–6 (6–4)	Williams Arena; Minneapolis, MN
Feb 14, 2006	No. 16	No. 18 Iowa	L 54–66	18–7 (6–5)	Carver–Hawkeye Arena; Iowa City, IA
Feb 18, 2006	No. 16	Michigan; Rivalry	W 90–71	19–7 (7–5)	Breslin Center; East Lansing, MI
Feb 22, 2006	No. 18	No. 13 Ohio State	L 68–79	19–8 (7–6)	Breslin Center; East Lansing, MI
Feb 26, 2006	No. 18	Indiana	L 71–78	19–9 (7–7)	Assembly Hall; Bloomington, IN
Mar 2, 2006; 7:00 pm, ESPN	No. 25	Wisconsin	W 74–65	20–9 (8–7)	Breslin Center; East Lansing, MI
Mar 4, 2006; 12:00 pm, CBS	No. 25	No. 10 Illinois	L 68–75	20–10 (8–8)	Breslin Center; East Lansing, MI
Big Ten tournament
Mar 9, 2006; 5:10 pm, ESPN2	(6)	vs. No. 11 Purdue opening round	W 70–58	21–10	Conseco Fieldhouse; Indianapolis, IN
Mar 10, 2006; 9:10 pm, ESPN Plus	(6)	vs. (3) No. 9 Illinois quarterfinals	W 61–56	22–10	Conseco Fieldhouse; Indianapolis, IN
Mar 11, 2006; 1:40 pm, CBS	(6)	vs. (2) No. 20 Iowa semifinals	L 48–53	22–11 (8–8)	Conseco Fieldhouse; Indianapolis, IN
NCAA tournament
Mar 17, 2006*; 7:10 pm, CBS	(6 DC)	vs. (11 DC) George Mason; First Round	L 65–75	22–12 (8–8)	University of Dayton Arena; Dayton, OH
*Non-conference game. ^{#}Rankings from AP Poll. (#) Tournament seedings in parentheses. DC=Washington, D.C. regional. All times are in Eastern Time Source.

== Player statistics ==
Individual player statistics (Final)
		Scoring		Total FGs			3-point FGs			Free-Throws			Rebounds				
Player	GP	Pts	Avg	FG	FGA	Pct	3FG	3FA	Pct	FT	FTA	Pct	Tot	Avg	A	Stl	Blk
Aerts, Jason	11	2	0.2	1	1	1.000	0	0		0	0		1	0.1	0	0	0
Ager, Maurice	34	656	19.3	226	495	.457	83	221	.376	121	159	.761	139	4.1	84	23	11
Brown, Shannon	34	585	17.2	202	433	.467	64	164	.390	117	141	.830	150	4.4	93	50	5
Darnton, Brandon	4	0	0.0	0	0		0	0		0	0		2	0.5	1	0	0
Davis, Paul	33	578	17.5	206	364	.566	6	19	.316	160	184	.870	301	9.1	54	34	29
Ducre, DeMarcus	6	5	0.8	1	1	1.00	1	1	1.000	2	2	1.000	6	1.0	1	0	0
Gray, Marquise	29	88	3.0	37	71	.521	0	0		14	38	.368	104	3.6	12	7	15
Hamo, Anthony	12	2	0.2	1	5	.200	0	3		0	0		6	0.5	1	0	0
Hannon, Jake	4	2	0.5	1	1	1.000	0	0		0	2	.000	2	0.5	0	0	0
Ibok, Idong	20	7	0.4	2	5	.400	0	0		3	6	.500	18	0.9	0	1	6
Joseph, Maurice	21	16	0.8	6	24	.250	3	13	.231	1	5	.200	11	0.5	1	1	0
Naymick, Drew	7	8	1.1	4	8	.500	0	0		0	0		11	1.6	3	4	2
Neitzel, Drew	34	283	8.3	98	240	.408	46	114	.404	41	44	.932	69	2.0	189	20	3
Rowley, Delco	30	31	1.0	12	22	.545	0	0		7	12	.583	33	1.1	2	4	2
Suton, Goran	31	94	3.0	40	85	.471	0	1	.000	14	19	.737	88	2.8	15	13	15
Tibaldi, Bryan	4	0	0.0	0	2	.000	0	1	.000	0	0		0	0.0	0	0	0
Trannon, Matt	22	102	4.6	38	69	.551	0	0		26	44	.591	94	4.3	30	21	10
Walton, Travis	34	61	1.8	21	53	.396	1	3	.333	18	25	.720	62	2.4	81	36	3

Legend
GP	Games played	Avg	Average per game
FG	Field-goals made	FGA	Field-goal attempts
Blk	Blocks	Stl	Steals	A	Assists

== Rankings ==
Ranking movement Legend: ██ Increase in ranking. ██ Decrease in ranking. (RV) Received votes but unranked. (NR) Not ranked.
Poll	Pre	Wk 2	Wk 3	Wk 4	Wk 5	Wk 6	Wk 7	Wk 8	Wk 9	Wk 10	Wk 11	Wk 12	Wk 13	Wk 14	Wk 15	Wk 16	Wk 17	Wk 18	Wk 19	Final
AP	4	4	12	13	14	12	10	9	7	14	11	11	12	12	16	18	25	NR	NR	N/A
Coaches	5		12	14	14	12	11	9	7	15	12	12	12	11	16	16	23	NR	NR	

== Awards and honors ==
- Maurice Ager – All Big Ten Second Team (Media), All Big Ten Third Team (Coaches)
- Paul Davis – All Big Ten Second Team
- Shannon Brown – All Big Ten Second Team
