= 2005–06 Indiana Hoosiers men's basketball team =

American college basketball season

2005–06 Indiana Hoosiers men's basketball

NCAA tournament, Round of 32
- Conference: Big Ten Conference
- Record: 19–12 (9–7 Big Ten)
- Head coach: Mike Davis (6th season)
- Assistant coaches: Donnie Marsh (2nd season); Kerry Rupp (2nd season)
- Home arena: Assembly Hall

2005–06 Big Ten Conference men's basketball standings
	Conf.				Overall
Team	W		L	PCT	W		L	PCT
No. 6 Ohio State	12	–	4	.750	26	–	6	.813
No. 15 Iowa †	11	–	5	.688	25	–	9	.735
No. 13 Illinois	11	–	5	.688	26	–	7	.788
Wisconsin	9	–	7	.563	19	–	12	.613
Indiana	9	–	7	.563	19	–	12	.613
Michigan State	8	–	8	.500	22	–	12	.647
Michigan	8	–	8	.500	22	–	11	.667
Penn State	6	–	10	.375	15	–	15	.500
Northwestern	6	–	10	.375	14	–	15	.483
Minnesota	5	–	11	.313	16	–	15	.516
Purdue	3	–	13	.188	9	–	19	.321
† 2006 Big Ten tournament winner As of March 14, 2006; Rankings from AP Poll

The 2005–06 Indiana Hoosiers men's basketball team represented Indiana University in the 2005–06 college basketball season. Their head coach was Mike Davis, in his sixth and final season in charge of the Hoosiers. The team played its home games at Assembly Hall in Bloomington, Indiana, and was a member of the Big Ten Conference.

Indiana finished the season with an overall record of 19–12 and a conference record of 9–7, good for 5th place in the Big Ten Conference. After beating Wisconsin in the quarterfinals, the Hoosiers fell to Ohio State in the semifinal of the Big Ten tournament. The Hoosiers then defeated San Diego State Aztecs in the first round of the NCAA tournament before losing to the Gonzaga Bulldogs in the second round. That game ended the season for the Hoosiers, and was the final game at IU for Mike Davis. Coach Davis resigned at the end of the season. In April, he accepted the head coaching position at UAB. Davis was replaced by Oklahoma head coach Kelvin Sampson.

== 2005–06 roster ==
No.	Name	Position	Ht.	Wt.	Year	Hometown/previous school
3	D.J. White	F	6–9	251	So.	Tuscaloosa, Alabama / Hillcrest High School
5	Marco Killingsworth	F	6–8	268	RS Sr.	Montgomery, Alabama / Auburn University
10	Roderick Wilmont	G	6–4	203	RS Jr.	Miramar, Florida / Miramar High School
11	Errek Suhr	G	5–8	156	Jr.	Bloomington, Indiana / Bloomington High School North
20	A. J. Ratliff	G	6–3	188	So.	Indianapolis / North Central High School
21	Ben Allen	C	6–11	256	Fr.	Melbourne, Australia / Australian Institute of Sport
22	Marshall Strickland	G	6–2	195	Sr.	Mount Airy, Maryland / South Carroll High School
23	Sean Kline	F	6–8	233	RS Sr.	Huntington, Indiana / Huntington North High School
24	Robert Vaden	G/F	6–5	224	So.	Indianapolis, Indiana / Bridgton Academy (Me.)
31	Cem Dinc	F	6–10	240	Fr.	Hamm NRW, Germany / Landschulheim Schloss Heessenn
32	Joey Shaw (Redshirt Year)	G	6–6	193	Fr.	Glendale, Arizona / Deer Valley High School
33	Lewis Monroe	G	6–5	192	RS Sr.	Madison, Wisconsin / Auburn University
34	Adam Ahlfeld	F	6–0	193	So.	Indianapolis, Indiana / North Central High School
44	Kyle Taber	F	6–8	220	RS Fr.	Evansville, Indiana / Evansville Central High School
51	Earl Calloway	G	6–3	173	Jr.	Atlanta / Georgia Perimeter College

== Schedule and results ==
Date time, TV	Rank^{#}	Opponent^{#}	Result	Record	Site (attendance) city, state
Regular season
11/18/2005*; 6:00pm, ESPNU	No. 22	Nicholls State	W 99–65	1–0	Assembly Hall (17,054); Bloomington, Indiana
11/21/2005*; 6:00pm, ESPN+	No. 22	Florida A&M	W 67–44	2–0	Assembly Hall (17,030); Bloomington, Indiana
11/26/2005*; 9:00pm, ESPN+	No. 22	at Western Illinois	W 102–79	3–0	Western Hall (5,021); Macomb, Illinois
11/30/2005*; 9:00pm, ESPN	No. 17	No. 1 Duke; ACC – Big Ten Challenge	L 67–75	3–1	Assembly Hall (17,343); Bloomington, Indiana
12/3/2005*; 8:00pm, ESPN+	No. 17	Eastern Michigan	W 79–63	4–1	Assembly Hall (17,169); Bloomington, Indiana
12/6/2005*; 7:05pm	No. 17	at Indiana State	L 67–72	4–2	Hulman Center (10,200); Terre Haute, Indiana
12/10/2005*; 3:45pm, CBS	No. 17	vs. No. 15 Kentucky; Indiana–Kentucky rivalry	W 79–53	5–2	RCA Dome (28,031); Indianapolis
12/19/2005*; 9:00pm, ESPN2	No. 18	at Charlotte	W 71–54	6–2	Dale F. Halton Arena (8,442); Charlotte, North Carolina
12/23/2005*; 6:00pm, ESPNU	No. 18	at Butler	W 73–55	7–2	Conseco Fieldhouse (13,152); Indianapolis
12/31/2005*; 6:00pm	No. 18	at Ball State	W 80–56	8–2	John E. Worthen Arena (11,500); Muncie, Indiana
1/3/2006; 6:00pm, ESPNU	No. 16	Michigan	W 70–63	9–2 (1–0)	Assembly Hall (13,619); Bloomington, Indiana
1/7/2006; 4:00pm, CBS	No. 16	No. 19 Ohio State	W 81–79	10–2 (2–0)	Assembly Hall (17,278); Bloomington, Indiana
1/11/2006; 7:00pm, ESPN	No. 9	at No. 14 Michigan State	L 73–87	10–3 (2–1)	Breslin Center (14,759); East Lansing, Michigan
1/17/2006; 6:30pm, ESPN	No. 13	No. 7 Illinois; Rivalry	W 62–60	11–3 (3–1)	Assembly Hall (17,328); Bloomington, Indiana
1/21/2006; 2:35pm, ESPNU	No. 13	Purdue; Rivalry/Crimson and Gold Cup	W 62–49	12–3 (4–1)	Assembly Hall (17,316); Bloomington, Indiana
1/24/2006; 9:00 pm, ESPN	No. 13	at Iowa	L 60–73	12–4 (4–2)	Carver–Hawkeye Arena (11,825); Iowa City, Iowa
1/29/2006; 7:00 pm, CBS	No. 13	at Minnesota	L 42–61	12–5 (4–3)	Williams Arena (13,136); Minneapolis
2/1/2006; 8:00pm, ESPNU	No. 22	Northwestern	W 72–63	13–5 (5–3)	Assembly Hall (17,094); Bloomington, Indiana
2/4/2006*; 1:00pm, CBS	No. 22	No. 1 Connecticut	L 80–88	13–6 (5–3)	Assembly Hall (17,324); Bloomington, Indiana
2/8/2006; 7:00pm, ESPN	No. 24	at Wisconsin	L 54–72	13–7 (5–4)	Kohl Center (17,142); Madison, Wisconsin
2/11/2006; 12:00pm, ESPN	No. 24	No. 18 Iowa	L 67–70	13–8 (5–5)	Assembly Hall (17,278); Bloomington, Indiana
2/15/2006; 8:00pm, ESPN+		at Penn State	L 68–71	13–9 (5–6)	Bryce Jordan Center (6,759); University Park, Pennsylvania
2/19/2006; 3:30pm, CBS		at No. 14 Illinois; Rivalry	L 58–70	13–10 (5–7)	Assembly Hall (16,618); Champaign, Illinois
2/22/2006; 7:00pm, ESPN+		Penn State	W 69–65	14–10 (6–7)	Assembly Hall (17,234); Bloomington, Indiana
2/26/2006; 12:00pm, CBS		No. 18 Michigan State	W 78–71	15–10 (7–7)	Assembly Hall (17,276); Bloomington, Indiana
3/1/2006; 8:00pm, ESPN		at Purdue; Rivalry/Crimson and Gold Cup	W 70–59	16–10 (8–7)	Mackey Arena (14,038); West Lafayette, Indiana
3/4/2006; 2:30pm, ESPN+		at Michigan	W 69–67	17–10 (9–7)	Crisler Arena (13,751); Ann Arbor, Michigan
Big Ten tournament
3/10/2006; 2:30pm, ESPN		vs. Wisconsin; Quarterfinals	W 61–56	18–10	Conseco Fieldhouse (18,730); Indianapolis
3/11/2006; 4:05pm, CBS		vs. No. 6 Ohio State; Semifinals	L 51–52	18–11	Conseco Fieldhouse (18,730); Indianapolis
NCAA tournament
3/16/2006*; 9:40pm, CBS	No. (6)	vs. No. (11) San Diego State; First Round	W 87–83	19–11	Jon M. Huntsman Center (15,122); Salt Lake City
3/18/2006*; 8:10pm, CBS	No. (6)	vs. No. 5 (3) Gonzaga; Second Round	L 80–90	19–12	Jon M. Huntsman Center (15,122); Salt Lake City
*Non-conference game. ^{#}Rankings from AP Poll. (#) Tournament seedings in parentheses.
