= 2005–06 Minnesota Golden Gophers men's basketball team =

American college basketball season

2005–06 Minnesota Golden Gophers men's basketball

NIT Second Round vs. Cincinnati, L 76–62
- Conference: Big Ten Conference
- Record: 16–15 (5–11 Big Ten)
- Head coach: Dan Monson (7th season)
- Assistant coaches: Vic Couch; Jim Molinari; Bill Walker
- Home arena: Williams Arena

2005–06 Big Ten Conference men's basketball standings
	Conf.				Overall
Team	W		L	PCT	W		L	PCT
No. 6 Ohio State	12	–	4	.750	26	–	6	.813
No. 15 Iowa †	11	–	5	.688	25	–	9	.735
No. 13 Illinois	11	–	5	.688	26	–	7	.788
Wisconsin	9	–	7	.563	19	–	12	.613
Indiana	9	–	7	.563	19	–	12	.613
Michigan State	8	–	8	.500	22	–	12	.647
Michigan	8	–	8	.500	22	–	11	.667
Penn State	6	–	10	.375	15	–	15	.500
Northwestern	6	–	10	.375	14	–	15	.483
Minnesota	5	–	11	.313	16	–	15	.516
Purdue	3	–	13	.188	9	–	19	.321
† 2006 Big Ten tournament winner As of March 14, 2006; Rankings from AP Poll

The 2005–06 Minnesota Golden Gophers men's basketball team represented the University of Minnesota in the college basketball season of 2005–2006. The team's head coach, Dan Monson, was in his seventh season with the Gophers and the team played their home games at Williams Arena in Minneapolis, Minnesota and are members of the Big Ten Conference.

== Season ==
After making the NCAA tournament the previous year, the Gophers had mixed results throughout the season. The team was able to win only two games on the road, but defeated three top 20 teams at home in conference play. After losing to eventual conference tournament winner Iowa, the Gophers accepted an invitation to the NIT where they would give their home fans one final win before being defeated on the road by Cincinnati in the second round.

== Roster ==
#	Name	Height	Weight (lbs.)	Position	Class	Hometown	Previous Team(s)
1	Lawrence McKenzie	6'2"	180	G	Jr.	Minneapolis, MN, U.S.	Minneapolis Henry HS; Oklahoma
2	Ryan Saunders	6'1"	193	G	So.	Wayzata, MN, U.S.	Wayzata HS
3	Kevin Payton	6'5"	200	G/F	Fr.	Camden, NJ, U.S.	Camden HS
11	Maurice Hargrow	6'5"	200	G	RSr.	St. Paul, MN, U.S.	Highland Park HS
13	Dan Coleman	6'9"	225	F	RSo.	Minneapolis, MN, U.S.	Hopkins HS
15	Vincent Grier	6'5"	210	G/F	Sr.	Charlotte, NC, U.S.	Dixie State JC
21	J'son Stamper	6'6"	235	F	Sr.	Bronx, NY, U.S.	Independence Community College
23	Brandon Smith	6'6"	205	G/F	Fr.	Minneapolis, MN, U.S.	Minneapolis Henry HS
24	Rico Tucker	6'0"	190	G	So.	San Diego, CA, U.S.	University HS
30	Jon Williams	6'9"	275	F	RFr.	St. Cloud, MN, U.S.	St. Cloud Apollo HS; Notre Dame Prep (MA)
31	Adam Boone	6'2"	200	G	RSr.	Minnetonka, MN, U.S.	Minnetonka HS; North Carolina
32	Zach Puchtel	6'6"	250	F	RJr.	Minnetonka, MN, U.S.	Hopkins HS
33	Jamal Abu-Shamala	6'5"	200	G	Fr.	Shakopee, MN, U.S.	Shakopee HS
34	Damian Johnson	6'7"	192	F	Fr.	Thibodaux, LA, U.S.	Thibodaux HS
50	Spencer Tollackson	6'9"	267	C	So.	Chaska, MN, U.S.	Chaska HS

== 2005–06 Schedule and results ==
Date time, TV	Rank^{#}	Opponent^{#}	Result	Record	Site city, state
Exhibition
November 5, 2005* no		SW Minnesota State	W 59–50		Williams Arena; Minneapolis, MN
November 10, 2005*; 7 p.m.		Minnesota–Duluth	W 78–64		Williams Arena; Minneapolis, MN
Regular Season
November 18, 2005*; 6 p.m., FSN North		North Dakota State	W 70–57	1–0	Williams Arena; Minneapolis, MN
November 26, 2005*; 3 p.m., ESPN Regional/FSN North		Tennessee–Chattanooga	W 67–46	2–0	Williams Arena; Minneapolis, MN
November 28, 2005*; 7 p.m., no		Gardner–Webb	L 73–72	2–1	Williams Arena; Minneapolis, MN
November 30, 2005*; 6:30 p.m., ESPN2		at No. 23 Maryland; ACC – Big Ten Challenge	L 83–66	2–2	Comcast Center; College Park, MD
December 3, 2005*; 12 p.m., no		Coastal Carolina	W 75–57	3–2	William's Arena; Minneapolis, MN
December 5, 2005*; 9:30 p.m., FSN		at Arizona State	W 85–79 ^{OT}	4–2	Wells Fargo Arena; Tempe, AZ
December 10, 2005*; 12 p.m., ESPN Regional/FSN North		UNLV	W 72–67	5–2	Williams Arena; Minneapolis, MN
December 14, 2005*; 7 p.m., ESPN Regional/FSN North		Alabama–Birmingham	W 69–68	6–2	Williams Arena; Minneapolis, MN
December 21, 2005*; 7 p.m., no		Grambling State	W 88–64	7–2	William's Arena; Minneapolis, MN
December 23, 2005*; 7 p.m., no		South Dakota State	W 80–61	8–2	Williams Arena; Minneapolis, MN
December 31, 2005*; 1 p.m., no		Oral Roberts	W 67–54	9–2	Williams Arena; Minneapolis, MN
Big Ten Regular Season
January 7, 2006; 1 p.m., ESPN Regional/KSTC-45		Northwestern	L 57–49	9–3 (0–1)	Williams Arena; Minneapolis, MN
January 10, 2006; 6 p.m., ESPN		No. 21 Wisconsin	L 64–62	9–4 (0–2)	Williams Arena; Minneapolis, MN
January 14, 2006; 7 p.m., ESPN Regional/FSN North-Delay		at Purdue	L 72–55	9–5 (0–3)	Mackey Arena; West Lafayette, IN
January 18, 2006; 7 p.m., ESPN Regional/FSN North-Delay		at No. 23 Iowa	L 76–72 ^{3OT}	9–6 (0–4)	Carver–Hawkeye Arena; Iowa City, IA
January 21, 2006; 7 p.m., ESPN Regional/FSN North		Michigan	L 71–55	9–7 (0–5)	Williams Arena; Minneapolis, MN
January 25, 2006; 8 p.m., ESPN Regional/FSN North		at No. 8 Illinois	L 77–53	9–8 (0–6)	Assembly Hall; Champaign, IL
January 29, 2006; 12 p.m., CBS		No. 13 Indiana	W 61–42	10–8 (1–6)	Williams Arena; Minneapolis, MN
February 4, 2006; 2 p.m., ESPN Regional/KSTC-45		at No. 20 Ohio State	L 67–53	10–9 (1–7)	Value City Arena; Columbus, OH
February 8, 2006; 7 p.m., ESPN Regional/FSN North		at Penn State	W 77–66	11–9 (2–7)	Bryce Jordan Center; University Park, PA
February 11, 2006; 1:30 p.m., ESPN Regional/KSTC-45		No. 12 Michigan State	W 69–55	12–9 (3–7)	Williams Arena; Minneapolis, MN
February 15, 2006; 6 p.m., ESPN Regional/FSN North		at Michigan	L 72–50	12–10 (3–8)	Crisler Arena; Ann Arbor, MI
February 18, 2006; 3:30 p.m., ESPN Regional/KSTC-45		No. 18 Iowa	W 74–61	13–10 (4–8)	Williams Arena; Minneapolis, MN
February 22, 2006; 8 p.m., ESPN Regional/FSN North		Purdue	W 62–50	14–10 (5–8)	Williams Arena; Minneapolis, MN
February 26, 2006; 1 p.m., ESPN Regional/FSN North		at Wisconsin	L 80–74	14–11 (5–9)	Kohl Center; Madison, WI
February 28, 2006; 8 p.m., ESPN		No. 10 Illinois	L 71–65	14–12 (5–10)	Williams Arena; Minneapolis, MN
March 4, 2006; 8 p.m., ESPN Regional/FSN North-Delay		at Northwestern	L 57–53	14–13 (5–11)	Welsh-Ryan Arena; Evanston, ILL
2006 Big Ten tournament
March 9, 2006; 2:30 p.m., ESPN2	(10)	vs. (7) Michigan; First Round	W 59–55	15–13	Conseco Fieldhouse; Indianapolis, IN
March 10, 2006; 6:40 p.m., ESPN Regional	(10)	vs. (2) No. 20 Iowa; Quarterfinal	L 67–57	15–14	Conseco Fieldhouse; Indianapolis, IN
2006 National Invitation tournament
March 15, 2006; 7 p.m., ESPN2	(4 C)	(5 C) Wake Forest; First Round	W 73–58	16–14	Williams Arena; Minneapolis, MN
March 21, 2006; 8 p.m., ESPN	(4 C)	at (1 C) Cincinnati; Second Round	L 76–62	16–15	Fifth Third Arena; Cincinnati, OH
*Non-conference game. ^{#}Rankings from AP Poll. (#) Tournament seedings in parentheses.

== Rankings ==
The 2005–06 Minnesota Golden Gophers basketball team was not ranked during the season.
