= 2005–06 Purdue Boilermakers men's basketball team =

American college basketball season

2005–06 Purdue Boilermakers men's basketball
- Conference: Big Ten Conference
- Record: 9–19 (3–13 Big Ten)
- Head coach: Matt Painter (1st season)
- Assistant coaches: Cuonzo Martin (6th season); Paul Lusk (2nd season); Todd Foster (7th season)
- Home arena: Mackey Arena

2005–06 Big Ten Conference men's basketball standings
	Conf.				Overall
Team	W		L	PCT	W		L	PCT
No. 6 Ohio State	12	–	4	.750	26	–	6	.813
No. 15 Iowa †	11	–	5	.688	25	–	9	.735
No. 13 Illinois	11	–	5	.688	26	–	7	.788
Wisconsin	9	–	7	.563	19	–	12	.613
Indiana	9	–	7	.563	19	–	12	.613
Michigan State	8	–	8	.500	22	–	12	.647
Michigan	8	–	8	.500	22	–	11	.667
Penn State	6	–	10	.375	15	–	15	.500
Northwestern	6	–	10	.375	14	–	15	.483
Minnesota	5	–	11	.313	16	–	15	.516
Purdue	3	–	13	.188	9	–	19	.321
† 2006 Big Ten tournament winner As of March 14, 2006; Rankings from AP Poll

The 2005–06 Purdue Boilermakers men's basketball team represented Purdue University during the 2005-06 NCAA Division I men's basketball season. Matt Painter, the current head coach, began his first year at Purdue. On February 11 the Boilermakers upset #22 Michigan at Mackey Arena, which was their first win over a ranked team since beating #19 Wisconsin in January 2004. Purdue finished 9–19 overall and 3–15 in the Big Ten. Although they finished in last place in the Big Ten, they had improved on their overall record from the previous year by two games. The Boilermakers would win at least 16 games per season in all of their following seasons.

== Roster ==
2005–06 Purdue Boilermakers men's basketball team
Players
Coaches

Pos.	#	Name	Height	Weight	Year	Hometown
G	5	Bryant Dillon	6 ft 6 in (1.98 m)	180 lb (82 kg)	Sr	Indianapolis, IN
G	11	Bobby Riddell	5 ft 9 in (1.75 m)	169 lb (77 kg)	Fr	Lafayette, IN
	11	Korey Spates	6 ft 0 in (1.83 m)	180 lb (82 kg)	Fr	Warrensville Heights, OH
G	14	Chris Lutz	6 ft 3 in (1.91 m)	190 lb (86 kg)	Fr	Bedford, NH
F	14	Carl Landry	6 ft 9 in (2.06 m)	248 lb (112 kg)	Sr	Milwaukee, WI
G	20	Marcus Green	6 ft 6 in (1.98 m)	224 lb (102 kg)	Fr	Franklin Park, IL
F	22	Nate Minnoy	6 ft 3 in (1.91 m)	260 lb (118 kg)	Fr	Chicago, IL
F	23	Marcus White	6 ft 8 in (2.03 m)	214 lb (97 kg)	Jr	Chicago, IL
	24	Dwayne Pruitt	6 ft 1 in (1.85 m)	213 lb (97 kg)	Fr	Gary, IN
G	31	Chris Hartley	6 ft 4 in (1.93 m)	198 lb (90 kg)	Jr	Noblesville, IN
F	32	Matt Carroll	6 ft 8 in (2.03 m)	241 lb (109 kg)	Sr	Aurora, CO
F	33	Gary Ware	6 ft 9 in (2.06 m)	245 lb (111 kg)	Sr	Detroit, MI
F	42	Matt Kiefer	6 ft 10 in (2.08 m)	233 lb (106 kg)	Sr	Evansville, IN

Head coach

Matt Painter (Purdue)

Assistant coach(es)

Cuonzo Martin (Purdue)
Paul Lusk (Southern Illinois)
Todd Foster (Purdue)

Legend

- (C) Team captain
- (S) Suspended
- (I) Ineligible
- (W) Walk-on
- Injured
- Current redshirt

Roster
Last update: 2024-09-25

== Schedule ==
Date time, TV	Rank^{#}	Opponent^{#}	Result	Record	Site city, state
November 19*		Wofford	W 82–75	1—0	Mackey Arena; West Lafayette, IN
November 22*		South Alabama	W 85–67	2—0	Mackey Arena; West Lafayette, IN
November 26*		vs. Xavier; Wooden Tradition	L 55–74	2–1	Conseco Fieldhouse; Indianapolis, IN
November 29*		at Florida State; ACC-Big Ten Challenge	L 57–97	2–2	Tallahassee-Leon County Civic Center; Tallahassee, FL
December 3*		at Evansville	L 69–75	2–3	Roberts Municipal Stadium; Evansville, IN
December 6*		Chicago State	W 69–56	3–3	Mackey Arena; West Lafayette, IN
December 11*		at Loyola (IL)	L 65–80	3–4	Joseph J. Gentile Arena; Chicago, IL
December 17*		New Orleans	W 68–56	4–4	Mackey Arena; West Lafayette, IN
December 20*		IPFW	W 79–69	5–4	Mackey Arena; West Lafayette, IN
December 28*		UT Martin	W 62–54	6–4	Mackey Arena; West Lafayette, IN
December 30*		at No. 4 Memphis	L 70–90	6–5	FedExForum; Memphis, TN
January 4		at Northwestern	L 53–66	6–6 (0–1)	Welsh–Ryan Arena; Evanston, IL
January 7		at Michigan	L 65–68	6–7 (0–2)	Crisler Center; Ann Arbor, MI
January 11		No. 19 Ohio State	L 64–80	6–8 (0–3)	Mackey Arena; West Lafayette, IN
January 14		Minnesota	W 72–55	7–8 (1–3)	Mackey Arena; West Lafayette, IN
January 18		at Penn State	L 54–74	7–9 (1–4)	Bryce Jordan Center; State College, PA
January 21		at No. 13 Indiana; Rivalry	L 49–62	7–10 (1–5)	Assembly Hall; Bloomington, IN
January 25		Northwestern	L 76–78 ^{OT}	7–11 (1–6)	Mackey Arena; West Lafayette, IN
January 28		at No. 8 Illinois	L 58–76	7–12 (1–7)	Assembly Hall; Champaign, IL
February 1		No. 23 Iowa	L 68–77	7–13 (1–8)	Mackey Arena; West Lafayette, IN
February 4		Wisconsin	W 70–62	8–13 (2–8)	Mackey Arena; West Lafayette, IN
February 8		at No. 12 Michigan State	L 52–77	8–14 (2–9)	Breslin Center; East Lansing, MI
February 11		No. 22 Michigan	W 84–70	9–14 (3–9)	Mackey Arena; West Lafayette, IN
February 18		Penn State	L 61–69	9–15 (3–10)	Mackey Arena; West Lafayette, IN
February 22		at Minnesota	L 50–62	9–16 (3–11)	Williams Arena; Minneapolis, MN
March 1		Indiana; Rivalry	L 59–70	9–17 (3–12)	Mackey Arena; West Lafayette, IN
March 5		at No. 9 Ohio State	L 57–76	9–18 (3–13)	Value City Arena; Columbus, OH
Big Ten tournament
March 9*	(11)	vs. (6) Michigan State; Opening round	L 58–70	9–19	Conseco Fieldhouse; Indianapolis, IN
*Non-conference game. ^{#}Rankings from AP Poll. (#) Tournament seedings in parentheses.
