= Greg Stokes =

American basketball player (born 1963)

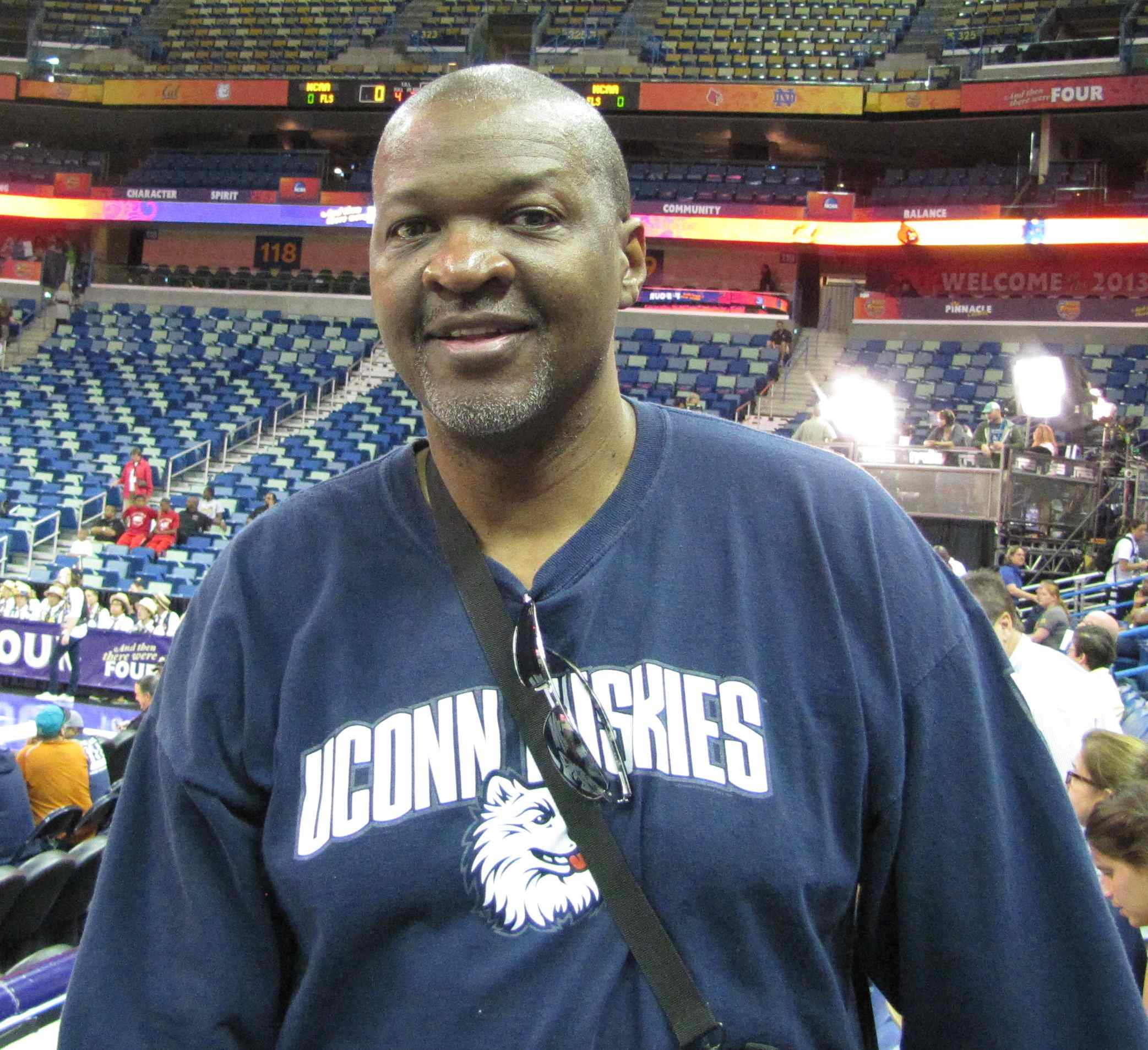

Personal information
- Born: August 5, 1963 (age 63) New Haven, Connecticut, U.S.
- Listed height: 6 ft 10 in (2.08 m)
- Listed weight: 220 lb (100 kg)

Career information
- High school: Hamilton (Hamilton, Ohio)
- College: Iowa (1981–1985)
- NBA draft: 1985: 2nd round, 33rd overall pick
- Drafted by: Philadelphia 76ers
- Playing career: 1985–1992
- Position: Power forward / center
- Number: 41

Career history
- 1985–1986: Philadelphia 76ers
- 1986–1988: Dietor Bologna
- 1988–1989: Joventut Badalona
- 1989: Vismara Cantù
- 1989: Sacramento Kings
- 1989–1990: Glaxo Verona
- 1991: Southern Melbourne Saints
- 1991–1992: Sioux Falls Skyforce

Career highlights
- No. 41 retired by Iowa Hawkeyes; Third-team Parade All-American (1981)
- Stats at NBA.com
- Stats at Basketball Reference
Medals
Men's basketball
Representing United States
Pan American Games
Gold medal – first place	1983 Caracas	Team competition

Gregory Lewis Stokes (born August 5, 1963) is an American former professional basketball player who was selected by the Philadelphia 76ers in the second round (33rd pick overall) of the 1985 NBA draft. He played at Hamilton High School in Hamilton, Ohio in 1980-1981 and help lead team to a 25–1 record and regional finals appearance. A 6'10" forward-center from the University of Iowa, Stokes played in two NBA seasons for the 76ers and Sacramento Kings, appearing in 42 games and scoring 130 points (3.1 ppg). He also played professionally in Italy and Australia. His daughter Kiah Stokes played college basketball at the University of Connecticut from 2011–2015, and currently plays in the WNBA as a member of the Golden State Valkyries and previously of the New York Liberty and Las Vegas Aces.

== Career statistics ==
Legend
GP	Games played	GS	Games started	MPG	Minutes per game
FG%	Field goal percentage	3P%	3-point field goal percentage	FT%	Free throw percentage
RPG	Rebounds per game	APG	Assists per game	SPG	Steals per game
BPG	Blocks per game	PPG	Points per game	**Bold**	Career high

=== NBA ===
==== Regular season ====
Year	Team	GP	GS	MPG	FG%	3P%	FT%	RPG	APG	SPG	BPG	PPG
1985–86	Phialdelphia	**31**	**13**	**11.3**	**.471**	.000	.667	**1.8**	**.5**	**.5**	**.4**	**4.1**
1989–90	Sacramento	11	0	3.1	.111	–	**1.000**	.5	.0	.0	.0	.4
Career		42	13	9.1	.445	.000	.696	1.5	.4	.3	.3	3.1

==== Playoffs ====
Year	Team	GP	GS	MPG	FG%	3P%	FT%	RPG	APG	SPG	BPG	PPG
1986	Philadelphia	7	7	12.9	.286	–	.846	1.9	.6	.3	.9	3.9
