= Erek Hansen =

American basketball player

Personal information
- Born: August 31, 1982 (age 44) Bedford, Texas, U.S.
- Listed height: 6 ft 11 in (2.11 m)
- Listed weight: 220 lb (100 kg)

Career information
- High school: Trinity (Euless, Texas)
- College: Kirkwood CC (2002–2003); Iowa (2003–2006)
- NBA draft: 2006: undrafted
- Playing career: 2006–2009
- Position: Center

Career history
- 2006–2007: CASA TED Kolejliler
- 2007–2008: Plus Pujol Lleida
- 2008–2009: CASA TED Kolejliler
- 2009: Albuquerque Thunderbirds

Erek Hansen (born August 31, 1982) is an American former professional basketball player. Ranks third in career blocked shots with 212. In 2006, he had 89 blocked shots, the third best single season total at Iowa. His 83 blocked shots in 2005 ranks fourth best for a single season. He led the Big Ten Conference in blocked shots as both a junior and senior.

== Honors ==
Plus Pujol Lleida

- LEB Catalan League Champion: 1
  - 2007

Iowa Hawkeyes

- Big Ten Tournament Winner
  - 2006
- All-Big Ten Defensive Player of the Year
  - 2006
- Big Ten All-Defensive Team
  - 2006
