= Greg Brunner =

American-Swiss basketball player

Personal information
- Born: June 15, 1983 (age 43) Charles City, Iowa, U.S.
- Listed height: 6 ft 7 in (2.01 m)
- Listed weight: 115 kg (254 lb)

Career information
- High school: Charles City (Charles City, Iowa)
- College: Iowa (2002–2006)
- NBA draft: 2006: undrafted
- Playing career: 2006–2014
- Position: Power forward
- Number: 8

Career history
- 2006–2007: Verviers-Pepinster
- 2007–2008: Telindus Oostende
- 2008: Ironi Nahariya
- 2008–2009: Biella
- 2009–2010: Sutor Montegranaro
- 2010–2011: Benetton Treviso
- 2011–2012: Sutor Montegranaro
- 2012: Cantù
- 2012–2014: Reggiana

Greg Brunner (born June 15, 1983) is an American-Swiss former basketball player.

== Career ==
Brunner signed with Grissin Bon Reggio Emilia in 2012.

== National team ==
From 2010 until 2014, Brunner played for the Swiss national basketball team.

== Honours ==
- Belgian Cup (1): 2008
- FIBA EuroChallenge (1): 2014
