= Jeff Horner =

American former basketball player (born 1983)

Buena Vista Beavers
- Title: Head coach
- League: American Rivers

Personal information
- Born: August 1, 1983 (age 43) Mason City, Iowa, U.S.
- Listed height: 6 ft 3 in (1.91 m)
- Listed weight: 185 lb (84 kg)

Career information
- High school: Mason City (Mason City, Iowa)
- College: Iowa (2002–2006)
- NBA draft: 2006: undrafted
- Playing career: 2006–2010
- Position: Point guard
- Coaching career: 2008–present

Career history

Playing
- 2006–2007: Euphony Bree
- 2007: Paris Basket Racing
- 2007–2010: Iowa Energy

Coaching
- 2008–2010: Valley HS (assistant)
- 2010–2014: Valley HS
- 2014–2018: North Dakota (DBO/asst.)
- 2018–2025: Truman
- 2025–present: Buena Vista

Career highlights
- Big Ten tournament Most Outstanding Player (2006); 2× Third-team All-Big Ten (2004, 2006); Third-team Parade All-American (2002); Iowa Mr. Basketball (2002)

Jeff Horner (born August 1, 1983) is an American former basketball player. He is best known as a point guard for the University of Iowa Hawkeyes basketball team. Horner is currently head coach of the Buena Vista University men's basketball team.

== Early life and college ==
Horner was born in Mason City, Iowa. His father Bob Horner was Mason City High School varsity basketball coach. Horner made a verbal commitment to the University of Iowa while in the ninth grade. Horner's sister Kristin played basketball for Drake University.

=== High school ===
Born in Mason City, Iowa, Horner graduated from Mason City High School in Mason City, Iowa in 2002. In his senior season, Horner averaged 31.2 points, 8.7 rebounds, and 6.8 assists per game, leading the prep team to a 21–2 overall record. He shot 53% from the field and 73% from the free throw line as a senior, averaged 25.3 points a game as a junior, along with 10.1 assists and 5.2 rebounds. He averaged 21.2 points, 10.2 assists and five rebounds per game as a sophomore, and led Mason City to 2 state tournament appearances as a junior and senior, with a 38–7 record over those two seasons.

=== College ===
At the University of Iowa, Horner played on the Hawkeyes basketball team all four years and graduated in 2006. He missed four games in December 2006 due to injury, ending a streak of 102 consecutive games played. Horner is second in three-pointers (232), ranks second in assists (563) and three-point attempts (635), 14th in career points (1,341), and also totalled 514 career rebounds. He is the only Iowa player ever to total over 1,000 points, 500 rebounds and 500 assists, and the only Iowa player ever to total over 200 points, 100 rebounds, and 100 assists in four seasons. In Big Ten career stats, Horner ranks 7th in assists (612) and three-point FG attempts (713) and 8th in three-point FGs (262) and helped lead the Hawkeyes to a 2006 Big Ten men's basketball tournament championship, being named Big Ten tournament Most Outstanding Player.

== Professional career ==
=== Playing career ===
Horner played professional basketball with the Euphony Bree, a team located in Bree, Belgium. He played for Paris Basket Racing in France until 2007. He was signed by the Iowa Energy, an NBA Development League team based out of Des Moines, Iowa, in October 2007.

=== Coaching career ===
Horner was the head varsity basketball coach at Valley High School in West Des Moines, Iowa, from 2010 to 2014. In 2014, he became a head of basketball operations at the University of North Dakota. In 2018, he became the head basketball coach at Truman State. In 2025, he became the head basketball coach at Buena Vista University.

=== Head coaching record ===
Record table
| Season | Team | Overall | Conference | Standing | Postseason |
|---|---|---|---|---|---|
Truman Bulldogs (Great Lakes Valley Conference) (2018–2025)
| 2018–19 | Truman | 14–15 | 9–9 | 8th | |
| 2019–20 | Truman | 23–8 | 14–4 | T–1st | NCAA Division II cancelled |
| 2020–21 | Truman | 20–3 | 18–1 | 1st | NCAA Division II Elite Eight |
| 2021–22 | Truman | 20–10 | 13–6 | 3rd | NCAA Division II First Round |
| 2022–23 | Truman | 12–16 | 7–13 | 11th | |
| 2023–24 | Truman | 15–14 | 12–8 | 4th | |
| 2024–25 | Truman | 17–12 | 11–9 | T–6th | |
| Truman: | | 121–78 (.608) | 84–50 (.627) | | |
Buena Vista Beavers (American Rivers Conference) (2025–present)
| 2025–26 | Buena Vista | 11–5 | 4–3 | | |
| Buena Vista: | | 11–5 (.688) | 4–3 (.571) | | |
| Total: | | 132–83 (.614) | | | |
National champion Postseason invitational champion Conference regular season champion Conference regular season and conference tournament champion Division regular season champion Division regular season and conference tournament champion Conference tournament champion

== Personal life ==
On August 29, 2019, Horner tweeted that he was diagnosed with testicular cancer on August 13, 2019. He will begin chemo at the University of Missouri.

In a February, 2021 article, it was announced that Horner was "cancer free".
