= Ed Horton =

American basketball player (born 1967)

Personal information
- Born: December 17, 1967 (age 58) Springfield, Illinois, U.S.
- Listed height: 6 ft 8 in (2.03 m)
- Listed weight: 230 lb (104 kg)

Career information
- High school: Lanphier (Springfield, Illinois)
- College: Iowa (1985–1989)
- NBA draft: 1989: 2nd round, 39th overall pick
- Drafted by: Washington Bullets
- Playing career: 1989–1997
- Position: Power forward
- Number: 32

Career history
- 1989–1990: Washington Bullets
- 1990–1991: Maccabi Tel Aviv B.C.
- 1991–1992: Tulsa Zone
- 1992: Rapid City Thrillers
- 1992: Columbus Horizon
- 1992–1993: Rockford Lightning
- 1993–1994: Fargo-Moorhead Fever
- 1994: Peñarol de Mar del Plata
- 1995: Titanes de Morovis
- 1996: Polluelos de Aibonito
- 1996–1997: Yakima SunKings

Career highlights
- First-team All-Big Ten (1989); Third-team Parade All-American (1985); Illinois Mr. Basketball (1985); McDonald's All-American (1985)
- Stats at NBA.com
- Stats at Basketball Reference

Edward C. Horton (born December 17, 1967) is an American former professional basketball player who was selected by the Washington Bullets in the second round (39th pick overall) of the 1989 NBA draft. He was a 6'8", 230 lb. power forward.

Horton played one full season in the NBA, appearing in 45 games and averaging 4.5 points per game for the Bullets during the 1989–90 season.

Horton was part of George Raveling's recruiting class at the University of Iowa in 1985 which included B. J. Armstrong, Roy Marble, Les Jepsen and Kevin Gamble. All five recruits went on to play in the National Basketball Association. Horton and Gamble played together at Lanphier High School in Springfield, Illinois. Horton was named First Team All-Big Ten in 1988–89.

Awards and achievements
Preceded by Brian Sloan	Illinois Mr. Basketball Award Winner; 1985	Succeeded by Nick Anderson
