= Bucky O'Connor =

American basketball coach (1913–1958)

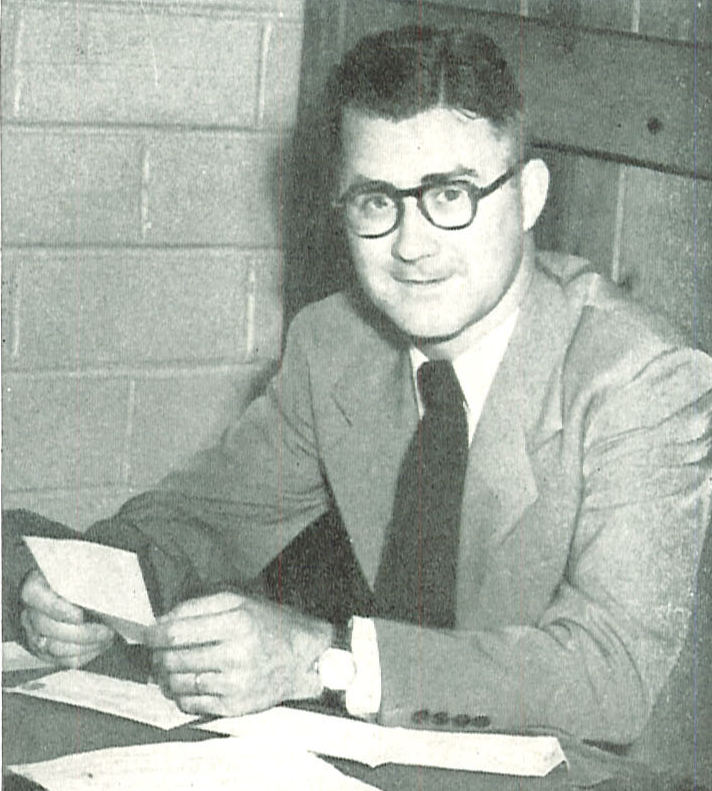
- O'Connor from 1956 Hawkeye

Biographical details
- Born: December 21, 1913; Monroe, Iowa, U.S.
- Died: April 22, 1958 (aged 44); Black Hawk County, Iowa, U.S.

Playing career
- 1933–1936: Drake

Coaching career (HC unless noted)
- 1950, 1951–1958: Iowa

Head coaching record
- Overall: 114–59 (.659)
- Tournaments: NCAA: 5-3 (.625)

Accomplishments and honors

Championships
- 2× NCAA Final Four (1955, 1956); 2× Big Ten champion (1955, 1956)

Frank "Bucky" O'Connor (December 21, 1913 – April 22, 1958) was a college men's basketball coach. He was the head coach of the Iowa Hawkeyes men's basketball team from 1949 to 1958. Born in Monroe, Iowa, O'Connor spent much of his early life playing golf, as his parents managed a country club. O'Connor attended and played basketball at Newton High School and Drake University; he became team captain in his senior year of college despite his slight frame and bad eyesight. After graduating, he coached at Boone High School and Harrisburg High School. When the United States entered World War II, O'Connor joined the United States Army Air Corps, serving in Japan and climbing to the rank of captain.

After the war, he held jobs in the athletic departments at Boone High and Boone Junior College, and ultimately joined the Iowa Hawkeyes athletic staff as the freshman basketball coach and head golf coach in 1948. In 1950, O'Connor took charge of the Hawkeyes' basketball team after the first two coaches of the 1949–50 season stepped down. He became the official coach in the 1951–52 season, in which the team achieved a 19–3 record and a second-place finish in the Big Ten Conference. O'Connor is best known in Iowa basketball history for recruiting and coaching the players who comprised the "Fabulous Five": Sharm Scheuerman, Bill Seaberg, Carl Cain, Bill Schoof and Bill Logan. This team first came together during the 1953–54 season, finishing second in the Big Ten with an 11–3 conference record (17–5 overall). The team won the Big Ten in the next two seasons, advancing to the Final Four both times. In the 1955–56 season, which was the Fabulous Five's final season together, the Hawkeyes won 17 consecutive games and advanced to their only National Collegiate Athletic Association (NCAA) championship game in school history, where they lost to the University of San Francisco, marking the end of Iowa's most successful era of basketball.

O'Connor coached the Hawkeyes for the next two seasons, compiling a combined record of 21–23 before dying in a highway accident on April 22, 1958, at the age of 44.

He was married to Jane, and had one daughter, Kathy.

== Head coaching record ==
Record table
Season	Team	Overall	Conference	Standing	Postseason
Iowa Hawkeyes (Big Ten Conference) (1950–1950)
1950	Iowa	6–5	6–5	5th	
Iowa Hawkeyes (Big Ten Conference) (1951–1958)
1951–52	Iowa	19–3	11–3	2nd	
1952–53	Iowa	12–10	9–9	6th	
1953–54	Iowa	17–5	11–3	2nd	
1954–55	Iowa	19–7	11–3	1st	NCAA Final Four
1955–56	Iowa	20–6	13–1	1st	NCAA Runner–up
1956–57	Iowa	8–14	4–10	8th	
1957–58	Iowa	13–9	7–7	6th	
Iowa:		114–59 (.659)	72–41 (.637)		
Total:		114–59 (.659)			
National champion Postseason invitational champion Conference regular season champion Conference regular season and conference tournament champion Division regular season champion Division regular season and conference tournament champion Conference tournament champion

== See also ==
- List of NCAA Division I Men's Final Four appearances by coach

== Bibliography ==
- Finn, Mike; Leistikow, Chad (September 2002). Hawkeye Legends, Lists, & Lore. Sports Publishing. ISBN 1-58261-512-8.
