= Dave Gunther =

American basketball player and coach (1937–2024)

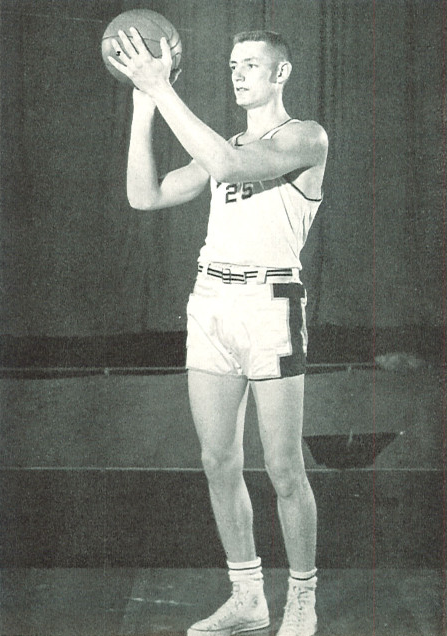
- Gunther from 1958 Hawkeye

Personal information
- Born: July 22, 1937 Le Mars, Iowa, U.S.
- Died: March 16, 2024 (aged 86) Mesa, Arizona, U.S.
- Listed height: 6 ft 7 in (2.01 m)
- Listed weight: 190 lb (86 kg)

Career information
- High school: Le Mars (Le Mars, Iowa)
- College: Iowa (1956–1959)
- NBA draft: 1959: 8th round, 56th overall pick
- Drafted by: Philadelphia Warriors
- Position: Forward
- Number: 11

Career history

Playing
- 1959–1960: Cleveland Pipers
- 1960: Detroit Pistons
- 1960–1961: Williamsport Billies
- 1961–1962: San Francisco Saints
- 1962: San Francisco Warriors

Coaching
- 1967–1970: Wayne State (NE)
- 1970–1988: North Dakota
- 1993–1995: Buena Vista
- 1996–2001: Bemidji State

Career highlights
- All-EPBL Second Team (1961); EPBL Rookie of the Year (1961); First-team All-Big Ten (1959)
- Stats at NBA.com
- Stats at Basketball Reference

David C. Gunther (July 22, 1937 – March 16, 2024) was an American basketball player and coach. He served as the head basketball coach at the University of North Dakota from 1970 to 1988. Gunther played college basketball for the Iowa Hawkeyes and professional basketball with the San Francisco Warriors of the National Basketball Association (NBA).

== Early years ==
Gunther was born in 1937 and attended Le Mars High School in Le Mars, Iowa. He attended Le Mars High School and, as a senior, was selected as the first-team center on the 1955 All-Iowa basketball team.

== College career ==
Gunther enrolled at the University of Iowa and played for the Iowa Hawkeyes men's basketball team at the forward position from 1956 to 1959. He scored 271 points (12.3 average) as a sophomore, 435 points (19.8 average) as a junior, and 482 points as a senior (21.9 average). He ranked 19th nationally in scoring during the 1958–59 season. He was selected as Iowa's most valuable player three consecutive years. He closed his college career with 1,188 points, tying the Iowa career scoring record set by Bill Logan from 1954 to 1956.

== Professional basketball ==
Gunther was selected by the Philadelphia Warriors in the eighth round of the 1959 NBA draft but Gunther stated at the time that he was not interested in playing professional basketball. In the fall of 1959, after completing a tour of military service with the U.S. Army, Gunther joined the Cleveland Pipers of the National Industrial Basketball League.

In June 1960, the Detroit Pistons purchased rights to Gunther from the Philadelphia Warriors. He played a portion of the season with the Pistons before being sold to the Williamsport Billies of the Eastern Professional Basketball League (EBL). He was selected as rookie of the year in the EPBL and selected to the All-EPBL Second Team in 1961.

In May 1961, the San Francisco Saints of the American Basketball League outbid the Pistons to sign Gunther. His season was cut short when he was called back into military service.

In 1962, he concluded his professional basketball career with the San Francisco Warriors of the NBA.

== Coaching career ==
After his playing career ended, Gunther worked as a basketball coach. He began his coaching career in 1963 as a head coach at Charles City High School in Charles City, Iowa. He next served as head basketball coach at Kimball High School in Royal Oak, Michigan, from 1964 to 1967.

In August 1967, he was hired as the head basketball coach at Wayne State College in Wayne, Nebraska. He served as head coach at Wayne State for three years, compiling a 70–12 record. He was selected as the Nebraska coach of the year in 1968 by the Lincoln Journal and in 1969 by the Omaha World Herald.

In the spring of 1970, Gunther was hired as the head basketball coach at the University of North Dakota. He continued to hold that position for 18 years until his retirement in March 1988. He compiled a 332–117 record at North Dakota.

In 1993, Gunther was hired as head basketball coach at Buena Vista in Storm Lake, Iowa. He led Buena Vista to a 25–25 overall record in two seasons. In March 1995, he was named head basketball coach at Bemidji State University. He retired in 2001 after six years at Bemidji.

== Death ==
Dave Gunther died at his home in Mesa, Arizona on March 16, 2024, at the age of 86.

== Career statistics ==
Legend
GP	Games played	GS	Games started	MPG	Minutes per game
FG%	Field goal percentage	3P%	3-point field goal percentage	FT%	Free throw percentage
RPG	Rebounds per game	APG	Assists per game	SPG	Steals per game
BPG	Blocks per game	PPG	Points per game	**Bold**	Career high

=== NBA ===
==== Regular season ====
Year	Team	GP	MPG	FG%	FT%	RPG	APG	PPG
1962–63	San Francisco	1	5.0	.500	–	3.0	3.0	2.0
