= Les Jepsen =

American basketball player (born 1967)

Personal information
- Born: June 24, 1967 (age 59) Bowbells, North Dakota, U.S.
- Listed height: 7 ft 0 in (2.13 m)
- Listed weight: 237 lb (108 kg)

Career information
- High school: Bowbells (Bowbells, North Dakota)
- College: Iowa (1986–1990)
- NBA draft: 1990: 2nd round, 28th overall pick
- Drafted by: Golden State Warriors
- Playing career: 1990–1995
- Position: Center
- Number: 51

Career history
- 1990–1991: Golden State Warriors
- 1991–1992: Sacramento Kings
- 1992–1993: Rockford Lightning
- 1993–1994: Fargo-Moorhead Fever
- 1994–1995: Hartford Hellcats
- Stats at NBA.com
- Stats at Basketball Reference

Les Burnell Jepsen (born June 24, 1967) is a retired American professional basketball player who played in the National Basketball Association (NBA) during the early 1990s.

A 7'0" center, Jepsen played at Bowbells High School in North Dakota and at The University of Iowa. He was part of George Raveling's recruiting class at The University of Iowa in 1985 which included B. J. Armstrong, Roy Marble, Ed Horton and Kevin Gamble. All five recruits went on to play in the NBA.

Jepsen was selected 28th overall in the 1990 NBA draft by the Golden State Warriors where he played the 1990–91 season under Don Nelson before being traded along with Mitch Richmond to the Sacramento Kings for Billy Owens on November 1, 1991 (shortly before the opening day of the 1991–92 season).

As a member of a touring team ("Footlocker Allstars"), Jepsen played in Europe in 1997. In the 1997–98 season, he played for the Newcastle Eagles in England and for New Wave Göteborg in Sweden.
