= Carl Cain =

American basketball player (1934–2024)

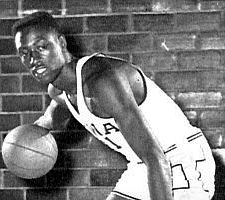
- Cain in 1956

Personal information
- Born: August 2, 1934 Freeport, Illinois, U.S.
- Died: June 2, 2024 (aged 89) Pickerington, Ohio, U.S.
- Listed height: 6 ft 3 in (1.91 m)
- Listed weight: 190 lb (86 kg)

Career information
- High school: Freeport (Freeport, Illinois)
- College: Iowa (1953–1956)
- NBA draft: 1956: 7th round, 49th overall pick
- Drafted by: Rochester Royals
- Position: Guard
- Number: 21

Career highlights
- First-team All-Big Ten (1956); 2× Second-team All-Big Ten (1954, 1955); No. 21 retired by Iowa Hawkeyes
- Stats at Basketball Reference
Medals
Men's basketball
Representing the United States
Gold medal – first place	1956 Melbourne	Team competition

Carl Cecil Cain (August 2, 1934 – June 2, 2024) was an American basketball player. He was a member of the United States national team that won the Olympic gold medal in the 1956 Summer Olympics. Born in Freeport, Illinois, Cain played college basketball for the Iowa Hawkeyes.

His number was retired by the University of Iowa basketball program. He is an inductee to the Des Moines Register State of Iowa Sports Hall of Fame.

== Early life ==
Cain was born in Freeport, Illinois, on August 2, 1934, to parents Sammie Cain Jr. and Ines Williams. He played with future Iowa Hawkeyes player McKinley Davis during his junior year in high school to win the Illinois state high school title in 1951. Bucky O'Connor recruited Davis to Iowa City and Davis asked Cain to accompany him. O'Connor liked the prospect of Cain joining the Iowa team. Cain initially decided to major in political science.

== Career ==
=== Fabulous Five ===
Cain was part of an Iowa Hawkeyes group termed the Fabulous Five who were part of the Final Four in the NCAA tournament for two years straight in the 1955–56 season, with only one other Iowa team in 1980 completing the feat since then. The group also consisted of Bill Logan, Bill Schoof, Bill Seaberg, and Sharm Scheuerman. Cain said in 2005 that the Fabulous Five were not "exceptionally talented", but that they "came together at Iowa at a time when our skills meshed with the coaching we received. When that happened, we became something special." Although any of the five players were able to have the lead role in a game, Cain was chosen as the Most Valuable Player during their sophomore and senior years. During their junior year, they were the first Iowa team to average 80 points per game.

During the first game to reach the Final Four in 1955, the Hawkeyes lost 76–73 to the La Salle Explorers. During that game, Cain had 17 points and 24 rebounds. In 1956, the Hawkeyes won 17 games straight to play in the NCAA title game against the San Francisco Dons. Cain had 17 points and 12 rebounds in the game.

=== Future sports career ===
Cain was part of the 1956 U.S. Olympic team and was on the same team as Bill Russell, who previously played for San Francisco during the earlier 1956 game. However, Cain did not play much during the gold-winning game. During his career he averaged 14.2 points and 14 rebounds in 74 games at Iowa. Cain was an inductee to the Des Moines Register's Iowa Hall of Fame. Cain said of the induction, "I was only a half-step above being ordinary." The Des Moines Register said, "But those who saw him display the shooting, rebounding and defensive tenacity that were his trademarks for the Fabulous Five will never question the fact that Cain deserves any recognition that comes his way." Cain's No. 21 jersey was retired along with those belonging to the other four of the Fabulous Five.

=== Retirement ===
After graduation, Cain joined the Army and was unable to continue playing basketball after his service due to back problems. His back pain started during his training at Fort Leonard Wood and his practices for the 1956 Olympic basketball team. His back tightened while he was tying his shoes before a 1956 Olympics game, causing him to be sent to the hospital for most of the game. Cain returned to score one point with a free throw. Cain said that the game "was one of the highlights" of his athletic career. He continued, "But I will put you in my place and let you figure out how it felt. It was an overwhelmingly difficult experience for me. It wasn't one I sought. It wasn't one I cherished. It was a great disappointment." Cain had a herniated disc which caused him to retire from basketball despite having an opportunity to play for the Rochester Royals in 1958 after his discharge from the Army.

== Personal life ==
Cain married his high school sweetheart, Katherine McNair, in 1957. They had three daughters. Cain's sister, Beverly, was married to K.C. Jones.

== Later life and death ==
Cain worked on Douglas Aircraft's assembly line, as a probation counselor, and later as a probation officer. Cain also worked for Chicago for Equitable Life Assurance Society, the Iowa-Des Moines National Bank, and Iowa Power and Light Co. Philanthropically he worked to raise money to build a new Hawkeye Sports Arena for his former school.

Cain died in Pickerington, Ohio on June 2, 2024, at the age of 89. Following his death, the city of Freeport named the date of his death as Carl Cain Day.
