= Kevin Boyle (basketball) =

American basketball player and color commentator (born 1960)

Kevin Boyle (born June 15, 1960) is the vice president of commercial insurance for Lincoln Savings Bank in Reinbeck, Iowa. Before joining Lincoln Savings in 1998, Boyle was on the Iowa Hawkeyes men's basketball team from 1978 to 1982. With Iowa, Boyle and his team reached the third place game of the 1980 NCAA Division I Basketball Tournament. Between 1980 and 1982, he was a two time steals season record and a one time assists season record holder for Iowa. After becoming their Most Valuable Player in 1982, Boyle left the Hawkeyes that year with 1,189 career points.

While with Iowa, Boyle won gold at the 1981 Summer Universiade with the United States basketball team. That year, Boyle was named the USA Basketball Male Athlete of the Year. As part of the Amateur Athletic Union, Boyle won the state championship with Converse-Airliner in 1983. For his overseas experience, Boyle played basketball in England, France and Switzerland during the 1980s. During his time period, Boyle won the 1986 Swiss Cup with Geneva. Apart from playing, Boyle worked at the University of Northern Iowa as an assistant coach and a color commentator during the 1980s to 2020s.

== Early life and education ==
Boyle was born in Evergreen Park, Illinois on June 15, 1960. Growing up, Boyle lived with his parents and seven siblings. Boyle's father worked for Nabisco when he and his family moved to St. Louis for his job. In 1975, Boyle started his four-year education with St. Laurence High School in Burbank, Illinois.

During this time, Boyle attended De Smet Jesuit High School in St. Louis, Missouri for less than a month. After transferring back to St. Laurence for the rest of his high school education, Boyle lived in Chicago while his family lived in St. Louis. While in Chicago, Boyle lived with his coach and his basketball teammates on three separate occasions.

In 1977, Boyle was the highest scorer during the Class AA boys' basketball tournament held by the Illinois High School Association with 76 points. During the tournament, Boyle and St. Laurence finished in fourth place. That year, Boyle was co-named Most Valuable Player (MVP) for St. Laurence with Jim Stack. Boyle was also MVP from 1977 to 1978 as a member of the Chicago Catholic League.

=== University ===
In 1978, Boyle joined the University of Iowa and played mainly as a forward for the Iowa Hawkeyes men's basketball team. During 1980, Boyle played as a guard while he filled in for Ronnie Lester while Lester was injured. At the third place game during the 1980 NCAA Division I Basketball Tournament, Boyle and Iowa were defeated by Purdue. Boyle was diagnosed with tendonitis after injuring his wrist during a game with Iowa in 1982. Following his injury, Boyle said the athletic tape he wore for his wrist "restricted my motion, my follow-through especially".

At Iowa, Boyle held the season record in steals from 1980 to 1981 and the assists season record in 1982. In 1981, he was named First-team All-Big Ten. In 1982, Boyle was a co-winner of the Best Defensive Player Award and the sole Most Valuable Player as part of his awards for Iowa that year. After leaving the Hawkeyes in 1982 with 118 career games, Boyle had 674 rebounds and 482 field goals as part of his 1,189 points.

== Career ==
=== Playing career ===
While with Iowa, Boyle won gold with the United States basketball team at the 1981 Summer Universiade. By April 1982, Boyle had also traveled to Argentina and other parts of the world for his basketball career. During the 1982 NBA draft, Boyle was selected by the Philadelphia 76ers during the sixth round. After the 76ers cut Boyle from the team, he went to England for his overseas basketball career. In October 1982, Boyle joined the National Basketball League as part of the Bracknell Pirates.

When Boyle was told a family member was in a car accident in January 1983, Boyle left England to go back to the United States. That month, Boyle ended his point guard experience with the Pirates as he was unhappy with the training he received and the lack of a contract. As a basketball player in the Amateur Athletic Union, Boyle won the state championship with Converse-Airliner. In July 1983, Boyle was with the San Diego Clippers during the Summer Pro League. He also trained with the Houston Rockets during their preseason in October 1983.

The following year, Boyle joined the Continental Basketball Association. With the CBA, Boyle was originally signed with the Bay State Bombardiers before he was traded to the Sarasota Stingers. After being cut from the Stingers, Boyle returned to the Bombardiers before being cut from Bay State in February 1984. By mid-1984, Boyle returned to Iowa to play basketball in exhibition games.

For his basketball experience in France, Boyle had gone to Hagetmau by the end of 1984. In 1985, Boyle played basketball in Doazit. He then went to Switzerland the following year after he declined a temporary arranged marriage proposed to him by a French basketball team. In Switzerland, Boyle and Geneva were the 1986 Swiss Cup winners. Boyle was also a coach while playing in Europe.

=== Northern Iowa and banking career ===
While in Switzerland, Boyle wanted to work with Eldon Miller at the University of Northern Iowa as part of the Northern Iowa Panthers. Boyle had previously turned down an offer to play college basketball for Miller at Ohio State University. In 1986, Boyle joined Northern Iowa as an assistant basketball coach. He also worked in college recruiting during his coaching tenure at Northern Iowa. Boyle remained in his coaching position until 1998 when he went to Reinbeck, Iowa to work for Lincoln Savings Bank. While at Northern Iowa, Boyle was a candidate to become the head coach of their men's basketball team in 1998 after Miller stepped down from the position.

Boyle was an insurance agent for Lincoln Savings when he also started working as a color commentator on the radio during basketball games for Northern Iowa in 2001. Leading up to the 2020s, Boyle continued working at Lincoln Savings as their vice president of commercial insurance while also continuing his radio commentating position with Northern Iowa. In 2022, Boyle announced he would end his radio position with Northern Iowa when the season ended.

== Honors and personal life ==
Boyle was called a "bionic man" by Norm Sloan, who coached the North Carolina State basketball team, during a tournament held the NCAA in 1980. In 1981, Boyle was the USA Basketball Male Athlete of the Year as part of the United States Olympic Committee. At the time, he was one of the U.S. Amateur Athletes of the Year. After Boyle completed his time at Iowa, Boyle received an athletic scholarship from the university in 1982. In 2018, Boyle was named into a Hall of Fame by the Illinois Basketball Coaches Association. Boyle married during the 1980s.
