= Chris Street =

American basketball player (1972–1993)

- Street in 1993

Personal information
- Born: February 2, 1972 Leon, Iowa, US
- Died: January 19, 1993 (aged 20) Iowa City, Iowa, US
- Listed height: 6 ft 8 in (2.03 m)
- Listed weight: 220 lb (100 kg)

Career information
- High school: Indianola (Indianola, Iowa)
- College: Iowa (1990–1993)
- Position: Power forward

Career highlights
- No. 40 retired by Iowa Hawkeyes

Christopher Michael Street (February 2, 1972 – January 19, 1993) was an American college basketball player. He played as a power forward for the Iowa Hawkeyes from 1990 to 1993. A potential NBA player, he died in an automobile crash during his junior year at Iowa.

== Biography ==
Along with basketball, Street also excelled in baseball and football during high school. He moved with his family to Indianola, Iowa, in the fall of 1987 and starred on the town's Class 4A team at Indianola High School. Street committed to play basketball at the University of Iowa as a junior in high school.

Street played in 28 games as a freshman and averaged 5.0 points and 5.1 rebounds per game. As a sophomore, he averaged 10.6 points and 8.2 rebounds per game. In the first 15 games of the 1992–93, season Street averaged 14.5 points and 9.5 rebounds per game. In his final game, he scored 14 points and collected 8 rebounds and extended his record of made free throws to 34, in a 65–56 loss to Duke. His 33rd and 34th consecutive free throws in that game set an Iowa school record.

On January 19, 1993, following a team dinner at the Highlander Inn outside of Iowa City, Street was killed when he drove his car onto the highway and collided with a snowplow. His girlfriend, Kim Vinton Klinedinst, was also in the car but survived the crash. The basketball game scheduled against Northwestern the following night was postponed.

== Legacy ==
After Street died, Iowa Hawkeye men's basketball coach Tom Davis said, "Chris represented all that is good about the Midwest and the state of Iowa. He was open, caring, honest, loving and lived life to the fullest every day."

Street's number 40 was retired by the University of Iowa's Men's Basketball team at Carver-Hawkeye Arena on February 6, 1993. At the end of each season, the Chris Street Award is given to the Hawkeye player or players who best exemplify the spirit, enthusiasm, and intensity of Chris Street. When it was announced that the award was created shortly after Street's death in 1993, Davis said, "We want to remember everything Chris represented. He was one of the greatest Hawkeyes of all time."

On February 25, 2018, Iowa Hawkeye guard Jordan Bohannon purposely missed a free throw against the Northwestern Wildcats that would have broken Street's school record, instead tying it with 34 consecutive made free throws. After the game, Bohannon spoke with reporters and said, "That's not my record to have. That record deserves to stay in his name."

Street is buried in the IOOF Cemetery in Indianola, Iowa.

== Career statistics ==
Legend
GP	Games played	GS	Games started	MPG	Minutes per game
FG%	Field goal percentage	3P%	3-point field goal percentage	FT%	Free throw percentage
RPG	Rebounds per game	APG	Assists per game	SPG	Steals per game
BPG	Blocks per game	PPG	Points per game	**Bold**	Career high

=== College ===
Year	Team	GP	GS	MPG	FG%	3P%	FT%	RPG	APG	SPG	BPG	PPG
1990–91	Iowa	28			.500	**.500**	.647	5.1	1.1	1.0	.2	5.1
1991–92	Iowa	**30**	**30**	**27.0**	.564	.357	.681	8.2	**1.8**	**1.1**	.4	10.6
1992–93	Iowa	15	15	26.8	**.574**	.222	**.892**	**9.5**	1.3	.6	**.9**	**14.5**
Career		73	45	27.0	.553	.313	.732	7.3	1.4	1.0	.4	9.3

== See also ==
- List of basketball players who died during their careers
