= Andre Woolridge =

American former basketball player (born 1973)

Personal information
- Born: November 11, 1973 (age 53) Omaha, Nebraska, U.S.
- Listed height: 6 ft 0 in (1.83 m)
- Listed weight: 190 lb (86 kg)

Career information
- High school: Omaha Benson (Omaha, Nebraska)
- College: Nebraska (1992–1993); Iowa (1994–1997)
- NBA draft: 1997: undrafted
- Playing career: 1997–2009
- Position: Point guard

Career history
- 1997–1999: Beşiktaş
- 1999–2000: Le Mans
- 2000–2001: Beşiktaş
- 2001–2002: P.A.O.K.
- 2002: Snaidero Udine
- 2002: Asheville Altitude
- 2002: Le Mans
- 2002–2004: Gravelines
- 2004: Ironi Nahariya
- 2005: Trotamundos de Carabobo
- 2006: Phantoms Braunschweig
- 2006–2008: Oyak Renault
- 2008–2009: Keravnos

Career highlights
- Israeli League Assists Leader (2005); Third-team All-American – AP (1997); 2× First-team All-Big Ten (1996, 1997)

Andre Woolridge (born November 11, 1973) is an American former basketball player. He was an All-American college player at the University of Iowa and played professionally for 12 years in nine countries. In 2005, he was the Israeli Premier League Assists Leader.

== Basketball career ==
Woolridge, a point guard from Omaha, Nebraska, starred for Omaha Benson High School where he led the team to the 1992 Nebraska state championship, scoring a record 50 points in the title game. He chose to play college basketball at the University of Nebraska–Lincoln as part of an acclaimed recruiting class with fellow in state talents Erick Strickland and Jaron Boone. He averaged 4.9 points and 2.0 assists per game and was named to the Big Eight Conference all-freshman team in 1993.

Following his freshman season, Woolridge transferred to Iowa to play for coach Tom Davis. After sitting out the 1993–94 season due to NCAA transfer rules, he became a three-year starter for the Hawkeyes. In his junior season, he was named first team All-Big Ten after averaging 13.1 points and 6.0 assists and leading the team to the 1996 NCAA tournament. As a senior, Woolridge became the first player to lead the Big Ten in scoring and assists and was again named first-team All-Big Ten. Woolridge also received national recognition as he was named a third team All-American by the Associated Press.

Following his college career, Woolridge was not selected in the 1997 NBA draft. He instead signed with Beşiktaş in the Turkish Basketball League, starting an international career that included the top leagues in Turkey, Italy, France, Germany, and Israel. In 2005, he was the Israeli Premier League Assists Leader. Woolridge retired in 2009 and started a basketball academy in Sacramento, California.
