= Iowa Hawkeyes men's basketball =

Men's basketball team of the University of Iowa

2026–27 Iowa Hawkeyes men's basketball team
- University: University of Iowa
- First season: 1901–02; 125 years ago
- Athletic director: Beth Goetz
- Head coach: Ben McCollum; 2nd season, 24–13 (.649)
- Location: Iowa City, Iowa
- Arena: Carver–Hawkeye Arena (capacity: 14,998)
- NCAA division: Division I
- Conference: Big Ten
- Nickname: Hawkeyes
- Colors: Black and gold
- Student section: Hawk's Nest
- All-time record: 1,796–1,259–1 (.588)
- NCAA tournament record: 34–32 (.515)

NCAA Division I tournament runner-up
- 1956
Other NCAA Division I tournament results
Final Four	1955, 1956, 1980
Elite Eight	1955, 1956, 1980, 1987, 2026
Sweet Sixteen	1955, 1956, 1970, 1980, 1983, 1987, 1988, 1999, 2026
Appearances	1955, 1956, 1970, 1979, 1980, 1981, 1982, 1983, 1985, 1986, 1987, 1988, 1989, 1991, 1992, 1993, 1996, 1997, 1999, 2001, 2005, 2006, 2014, 2015, 2016, 2019, 2021, 2022, 2023, 2026

Conference tournament champions
- Big Ten: 2001, 2006, 2022

Conference regular-season champions
- Big Ten: 1923, 1926, 1945, 1955, 1956, 1968, 1970, 1979

Uniforms
Home	Away	Alternate

The Iowa Hawkeyes men's basketball team represents the University of Iowa in the sport of basketball. The Hawkeyes compete in NCAA Division I’s Big Ten Conference. Home games are played at Carver-Hawkeye Arena. Iowa is led by head coach Ben McCollum.

The Hawkeyes have had eight National Invitation Tournament appearances, won eight Big Ten regular-season conference championships and won the Big Ten tournament three times. Iowa has played in 30 NCAA Men's Basketball Tournaments and advanced to the Final Four on three occasions, reaching the semifinals in 1955 and 1980 and playing in the championship game against the University of San Francisco in 1956.

Iowa basketball was widely successful in the 1970s, 1980s, and 1990s with a program resurgence under Lute Olson and the tenures of George Raveling and Tom Davis. Under Olson, the Hawkeyes won their last Big Ten regular season championship and went to the 1980 Final Four.

They currently play in 15,400-seat Carver–Hawkeye Arena, along with Iowa women's basketball, wrestling, and volleyball teams.

Prior to playing in Carver-Hawkeye Arena, which opened in 1983, the Hawkeyes played in the Iowa Armory and the Iowa Field House, which is still used today by the school's gymnastics teams. In 2006, the Hawkeyes accumulated a school-record 21 consecutive wins at home before losing to in-state rival Northern Iowa.

Three Iowa head coaches have been inducted into the Naismith Basketball Hall of Fame as coaches: Sam Barry, Ralph Miller, and Lute Olson. A fourth Hawkeyes head coach, George Raveling, is a member in the Hall's contributor category.

== History ==
=== Early years (1901–1922) ===
The roots of Iowa basketball lie in 1901, when Ed Rule coached the Hawkeyes to a 10–2 record in their very first season of varsity basketball. Earlier, when the sport was evolving and still in a club format, Iowa played the University of Chicago in the first five-on-five college game on January 18, 1896. Rule coached the Hawkeyes in four non-consecutive seasons (1901–02, 03–04, 05–07), leading Iowa to a 37–15 record under his watch. Even today, Rule's winning percentage stands as the best among head coaches in Iowa basketball history.

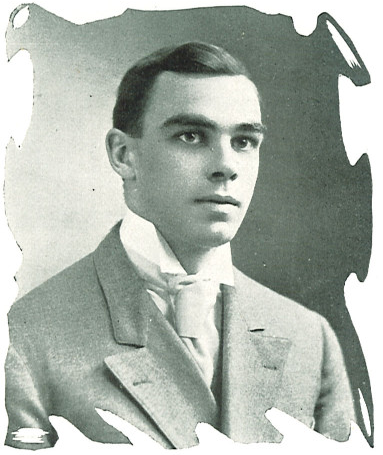
Coach Ed Rule, 1907

Aside from Rule's tenure, the Hawkeyes were coached by: Fred Bailey (1902–1903), John Chalmers (1904–1905), John Griffith (1907–1910), Walter Stewart (1910–1912), Floyd Thomas (1912–1913), Maury Kent (1913–1918), Edwin Bannick (1918–1919), and James Ashmore (1919–1922). In the era of multiple sport coaches, Chalmers (24–8), Griffin (2–4), Kent (assistant) and Ashmore (assistant) also were Coaches of Iowa Hawkeyes football. Kent pitched briefly for the Brooklyn Dodgers and coached the Iowa Hawkeyes baseball team (42–26), as did Chalmers (24–6), Stewart (16–12), Ashmore (23–20) and Griffith (9–6). From 1902 to 1923, the best Iowa basketball finished in conference play was fifth on three separate occasions. Iowa began play in the Western Conference (1902–1917) which evolved and changed its name to the Big Ten Conference beginning in 1917–1918.

=== Sam Barry era (1922–1929) ===
In 1922, Sam Barry was hired as Iowa's 10th head coach. In Barry's first season, 1923, Iowa went 13–2 overall and won the Big Ten championship for the first time in school history. The winning did not stop there: the Hawkeyes also tied for the Big Ten championship in 1926, along with Indiana, Michigan, and Purdue. Barry also coached the Iowa Hawkeyes baseball team, going 19–15 from 1923 to 1924. Before Barry continued his Hall of Fame career at USC in 1929, he authored a handbook on the sport, Basketball: Individual Play and Team Play, featuring Iowa players and facilities. 62–54 at Iowa, Barry remained at USC until his premature death in 1950 at age 57. Barry was inducted into the Naismith Basketball Hall of Fame in 1979.

Year	School	Coach	Record	Conference	Big Ten Rank
1922–23	Iowa	Sam Barry	13–2	11–1	T-1st
1923–24	Iowa	Sam Barry	7–18	4–8	9th
1924–25	Iowa	Sam Barry	6–10	5–7	7th
1925–26	Iowa	Sam Barry	12–5	8–4	T-1st
1926–27	Iowa	Sam Barry	9–8	7–5	T-4th
1927–28	Iowa	Sam Barry	6–11	3–7	T-7th
1928–29	Iowa	Sam Barry	9–8	5–7	7th
Totals			62–54 (.534)	43–39 (.524)	

=== Rollie Williams era (1929–1942) ===
Following Barry in the line of Hawkeye coaches was Rollie Williams, who would coach Iowa on two occasions, from 1929 to 1942 and in 1951. Williams' winning percentage of 51.5% (139–131), and his long tenure at Iowa allowed him to become the winningest coach in Iowa history until Lute Olson, Tom Davis and Fran McCaffery surpassed him.

Early during Williams' head coaching tenure, in 1929, Iowa's teams were suspended from participation in the Big Ten for violating conference rules. After a Big Ten investigation uncovered an illegal slush fund and possible recruiting violations, Iowa relented to the Big Ten's demands and was eventually reinstated into the conference on February 1, 1930. Fourteen players, including four on the basketball squad, were declared ineligible as a result of the Big Ten's findings.

Nile Kinnick, the 1939 Heisman Trophy winner for Iowa Hawkeyes football, also played basketball at Iowa. Starting for Coach Williams in 1937–38 as a sophomore, Kinnick finished 2nd on the team and 15th in Big Ten scoring with 75 total points (6.3 points per game) that season, his only hoops season.

Williams left the Hawkeyes in 1942 during World War II to enter military service in the Navy. He would return to Iowa after his tour of duty and coached one final season in 1950–51, after illness had forced Pop Harrison away from the sideline the previous season.

Overall Williams had a 42-year tenure at the University of Iowa (1924 to 1966), working in various coaching capacities and moving into athletic administration at Iowa after his coaching career.

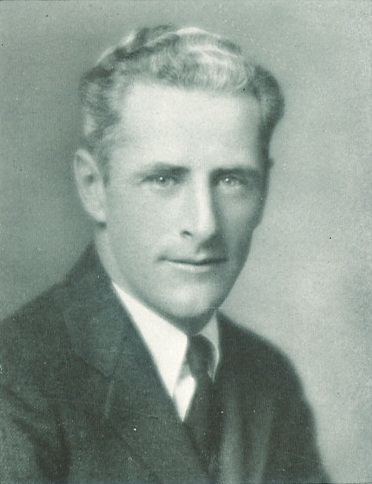
Coach Rollie Williams, 1941. Iowa yearbook

Year	School	Coach	Record	Conference	Big Ten Rank
1929–30	Iowa	Rollie Williams	4–13	0–0*	10th
1930–31	Iowa	Rollie Williams	5–12	2–10	10th
1931–32	Iowa	Rollie Williams	5–12	3–9	T-8th
1932–33	Iowa	Rollie Williams	15–5	8–4	T-3rd
1933–34	Iowa	Rollie Williams	13–6	6–6	T-5th
1933–35	Iowa	Rollie Williams	10–9	6–6	6th
1935–36	Iowa	Rollie Williams	9–10	5–7	T-6th
1936–37	Iowa	Rollie Williams	11–9	3–9	T-8th
1937–38	Iowa	Rollie Williams	11–9	6–6	T-5th
1938–39	Iowa	Rollie Williams	8–11	3–9	10th
1939–40	Iowa	Rollie Williams	9–12	4–8	8th
1940–41	Iowa	Rollie Williams	12–8	4–8	8th
1941–42	Iowa	Rollie Williams	12–8	10–5	T-2nd
1950–51*	Iowa	Rollie Williams	15–7	9–5	3rd
Totals			139–131 (.515)	69–90 (.434)	

=== Pops Harrison era (1942–1950) ===
Just as the country emerged from the Depression, so did Iowa's basketball fortunes. Following a rocky 7–10 season in 1943, Pops Harrison led the Hawkeyes to their third overall Big Ten title (and first unshared title) in 1945.

Murray Weir was the centerpiece of Pops Harrison's teams from 1944 to 1948, as Wier was a starter in all four-year season, playing under coach Harrison and developed into a prolific scorer, leading the NCAA in scoring. In 1944–45, the Hawkeyes won the Big Ten Conference season championship. The Hawkeyes finished second to the Michigan Wolverines in the Big Ten during Weir's his senior season of 1947–48.

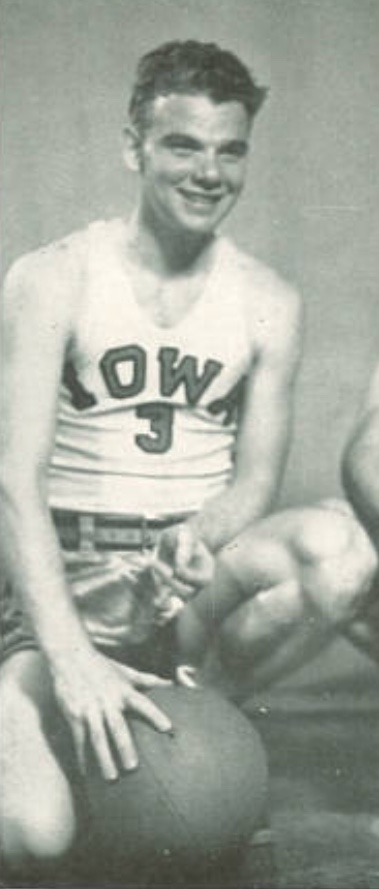
Murray Wier was a consensus first-team All-American in 1948.

Wier led the Hawkeyes in scoring in 1946–47 and 1947–48 with 15.1 and 21.0 points per game. Weir's 21.0 ppg led the NCAA in scoring in 1947–1948, with Wier becoming the first officially recognized Major College division scoring leader. Weir was a first team all–Big Ten selection and was selected as the Big Ten's Most Valuable Player. Weir was named a 1948 consensus first team All-American.

In the following decade, from 1946 to 1956, the Hawkeyes had but one non–winning season in 1948–49, Harrison's last full season as head coach. Illness forced Harrison miss a good portion of the 1949–50 season, coaching in 11 games.

Year	School	Coach	Record	Conference	Big Ten Rank
1942–43	Iowa	Pops Harrison	7–10	3–9	9th
1943–44	Iowa	Pops Harrison	14–4	9–3	T-2nd
1944–45	Iowa	Pops Harrison	17–1	11–1	1st
1945–46	Iowa	Pops Harrison	14–4	8–4	T-3rd
1946–47	Iowa	Pops Harrison	12–7	5–7	6th
1947–48	Iowa	Pops Harrison	15–4	8–4	2nd
1948–49	Iowa	Pops Harrison	10–10	3–9	8th
1949–50	Iowa	Pops Harrison	9–2*	1–1*	Inc*
Totals			98–42 (.700)	46–38 (.548)	

=== Bucky O'Connor era (1949–1958) ===
After playing and graduating from Drake University, O'Connor first came to Iowa from Boone Junior College in Boone, Iowa. He began at Iowa as the freshman basketball coach and Head Golf Coach in 1948. In 1950, O'Connor took over after the first two coaches of the 1949–50 season stepped down. He became the official coach in the 1951–52 season. Following short tenures by O'Connor in 1950 and Rollie Williams (with O'Connor assisting) for the entire 1950–51 season, in subbing for the ill Pops Harrison, O'Connor became Iowa's permanent coach in 1951. O'Connor would hold that position and achieve great success, until his death on April 22, 1958.

Chuck Darling was an early prominent player under O'Connor. Darling was a Consensus first–team All-American in (1952), along with being named 1952 First–team All-Big Ten. Darling was the first-round pick (#8 overall) of the Rochester Royals in the 1952 NBA draft. He played instead for the AAU Phillips 66ers in order to remain an amateur. He later played in the 1956 Olympics.

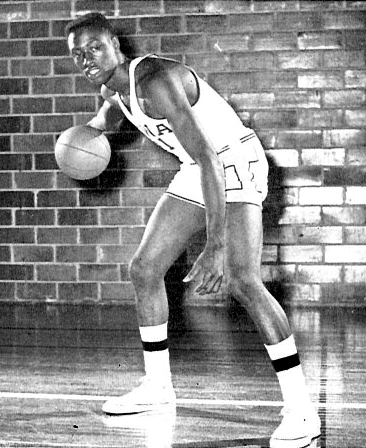
Carl Cain, 1956. Cain's number is retired at Iowa. He was an Olympic gold medalist as a member of the 1956 US Olympic basketball team.

==== The Fabulous Five and back-to-back Final Fours ====
In 1952–53, Iowa finished second in the Big Ten behind the efforts of a starting lineup fully composed of sophomores nicknamed the "Fabulous Five:"Sharm Scheuerman, Bill Seaberg, Carl Cain, Bill Schoof, and Bill Logan.

As juniors in 1954–55, Iowa, with the "Fabulous Five" won the Big Ten outright and eventually finished fourth in the nation. Iowa advanced to the Final Four of the 1955 NCAA tournament, defeating Penn State 82–53 and Marquette 86–81 to advance.

In 1955–56, as seniors, Iowa again won the Big Ten outright and advanced to the Final Four of the 1956 NCAA tournament. They defeated Morehead State 97–83 and Kentucky and Coach Adolph Rupp 89–77 to advance to the Final Four. There, they defeated Temple 83–76 to advance to the national championship game. In the championship game, Iowa lost to the undefeated defending national champions — the Bill Russell-led San Francisco Dons – by a score of 83–71. To date, it remains the only national championship game appearance by the Hawkeyes.

Despite losing in the championship game, for the only time in school history, the Hawkeyes recorded consecutive Big Ten championships. Scheuerman, Seaberg, Cain, Schoof, and Logan, all members of the "Fabulous Five", had their jerseys retired in 1980.

==== 1956 USA Basketball Olympians ====
Chuck Darling and Carl Cain were members of the 1956 United States men's Olympic basketball team that won the gold medal at the 1956 Melbourne Olympics. Hall of famers Bill Russell and KC Jones were fellow team members. Darling averaged 9.3 points per game in the Olympics.

==== O'Connor's death ====
On April 22, 1958, at the age of 44, O'Connor died in a car accident near Waterloo, Iowa, killed in a collision with a truck on Highway 218. O'Connor, who had once coached Iowa's Golf team, was on his way to Waterloo to play golf before a speaking engagement with the Sports of Sorts Club in Waterloo.

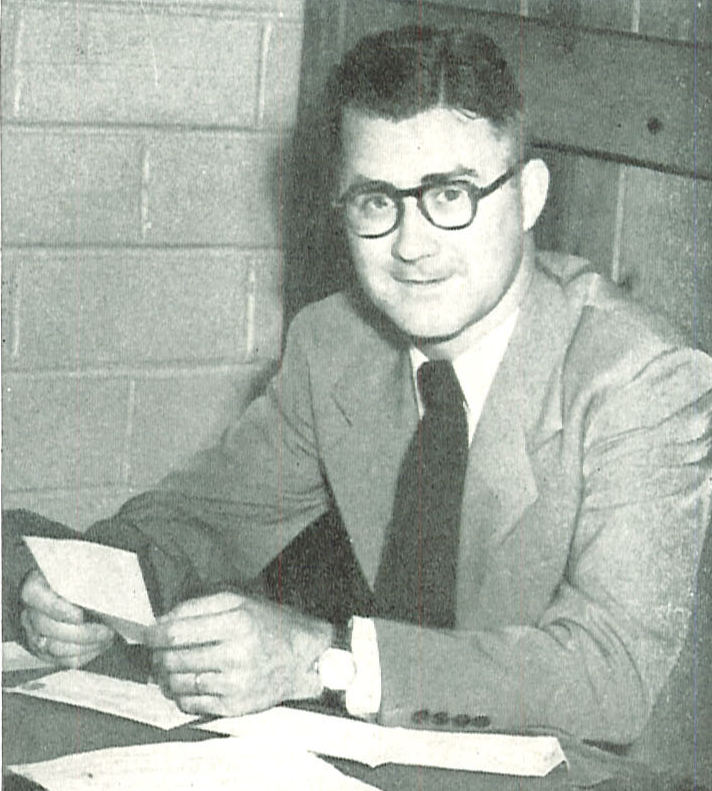
Bucky O'Connor, 1956. O'Connor died in 1958. He coached the Hawkeyes to back-to-back Final Fours. University of Iowa yearbook.

Year	School	Coach	Record	Conference	Big Ten Rank	Postseason
1949–50	Iowa	Bucky O'Connor	6–5* (15–7)	5–5* (6–6)	5th	

Year	School	Coach	Record	Conference	Big Ten Rank	Postseason
1950–51	Iowa	Rollie Williams	15–7	9–5	3rd	

Year	School	Coach	Record	Conference	Big Ten Rank	Postseason
1951–52	Iowa	Bucky O'Connor	19–3	11–3	2nd	
1952–53	Iowa	Bucky O'Connor	12–10	9–9	6th	
1953–54	Iowa	Bucky O'Connor	17–5	11–3	2nd	
1954–55	Iowa	Bucky O'Connor	19–7	11–3	1st	NCAA FINAL FOUR
1955–56	Iowa	Bucky O'Connor	20–6	13–1	1st	NCAA RUNNER-UP
1956–57	Iowa	Bucky O'Connor	8–14	4–10	8th	
1957–58	Iowa	Bucky O'Connor	13–9	7–7	6th	
Totals			114–59 (.659)	71–41 (.634)*		

- Includes Second Half of 1949–50 Season

=== Sharm Scheuerman era (1958–1964) ===
After graduating from Iowa, Scheuerman had been hired as an assistant coach under Bucky O'Connor. Scheuerman was hired as head coach in 1958 after O'Connor was killed. At age 24, Scheuerman became the youngest head basketball coach in Big Ten Conference history. In six years as the Hawkeyes' head coach, Scheuerman's teams compiled a record of 72–69. Bob King was an assistant under Scheuerman from 1960 to 1962. Scheuerman resigned after the 1963–1964 season and entered private business. He later became an announcer for Iowa telecasts.

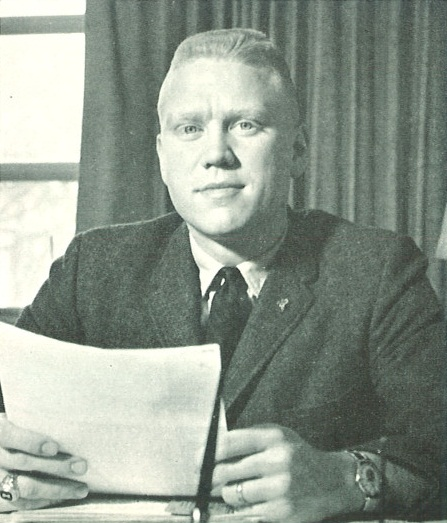
Coach Sharm Scheuerman, 1962. University of Iowa yearbook

A two-time All-American at Iowa, Naismith Basketball Hall of Fame Inductee and 5 x NBA Champion and Coach, Don Nelson, played for Iowa and Coach Scheuerman from 1959 to 1962. Nelson has the most wins as a coach in NBA history and his #19 is retired by the Boston Celtics.

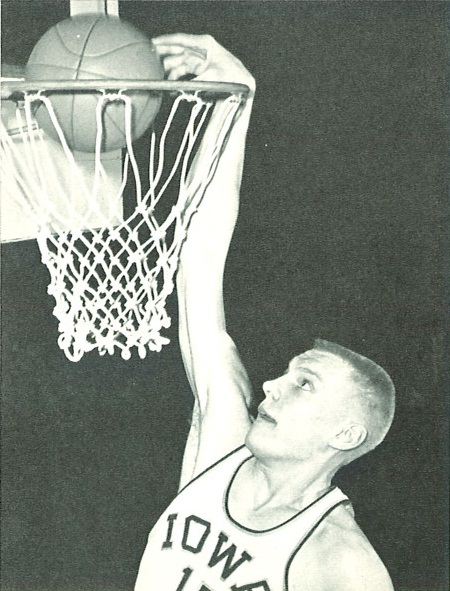
Naismith Basketball Hall of Fame inductee Don Nelson, 1962. Nelson was an All-American at Iowa. University of Iowa yearbook.

Scheuerman recruited Naismith Hall of Fame player Connie Hawkins to Iowa in 1960. After enrolling at Iowa as a freshman, Hawkins was named in an investigation into gambling and point-shaving in his native New York City. Hawkins had borrowed and repaid $200 from former NBA player Jack Molinas and was questioned by the FBI without legal representation. He was banned and never played collegiately again, before embarking on a professional career. He eventually sued the NBA who had banned him, winning a $1.6 million settlement and reinstatement. Hawkins' #42 was retired by the Phoenix Suns.

Year	School	Coach	Record	Conference	Big Ten Rank	Postseason
1958–59	Iowa	Sharm Scheuerman	10–12	7–7	T-5th	
1959–60	Iowa	Sharm Scheuerman	14–10	6–8	T-6th	
1960–61	Iowa	Sharm Scheuerman	18–6	10–4	T-2nd	
1961–62	Iowa	Sharm Scheuerman	13–11	7–7	T-4th	
1962–63	Iowa	Sharm Scheuerman	9–15	5–9	8th	
1963–64	Iowa	Sharm Scheuerman	8–15	3–11	9th	
Totals			72–69 (.511)	38–46 (.452)		

=== Ralph Miller era (1964–1970) ===
Iowa enjoyed five years of success under Ralph Miller from 1965 to 1966 through 1969–70, winning two Big Ten conference titles. Miller joined the Hawks as head coach after completing a successful stint as head coach at Wichita State.

The 1967–68 team tied for the Big Ten Title with Ohio State with a 10–4 conference record, and a 16–9 overall record. This team was led by Sam Williams, a high-scoring forward who led the Big Ten in scoring that year.

The 1969–70 team was arguably the greatest team in Iowa basketball history. Known as the "Six-Pack" (because only 6 players played most of the minutes), this team stormed through the Big Ten with a perfect 14–0 record, one of the few Big Ten teams ever to go undefeated in the conference. The team averaged over 100 points in conference play, highlighted by a 108–107 victory in West Lafayette over Purdue late in the season to clinch the outright title. Rick Mount of Purdue scored 61 points in that game in a losing effort.

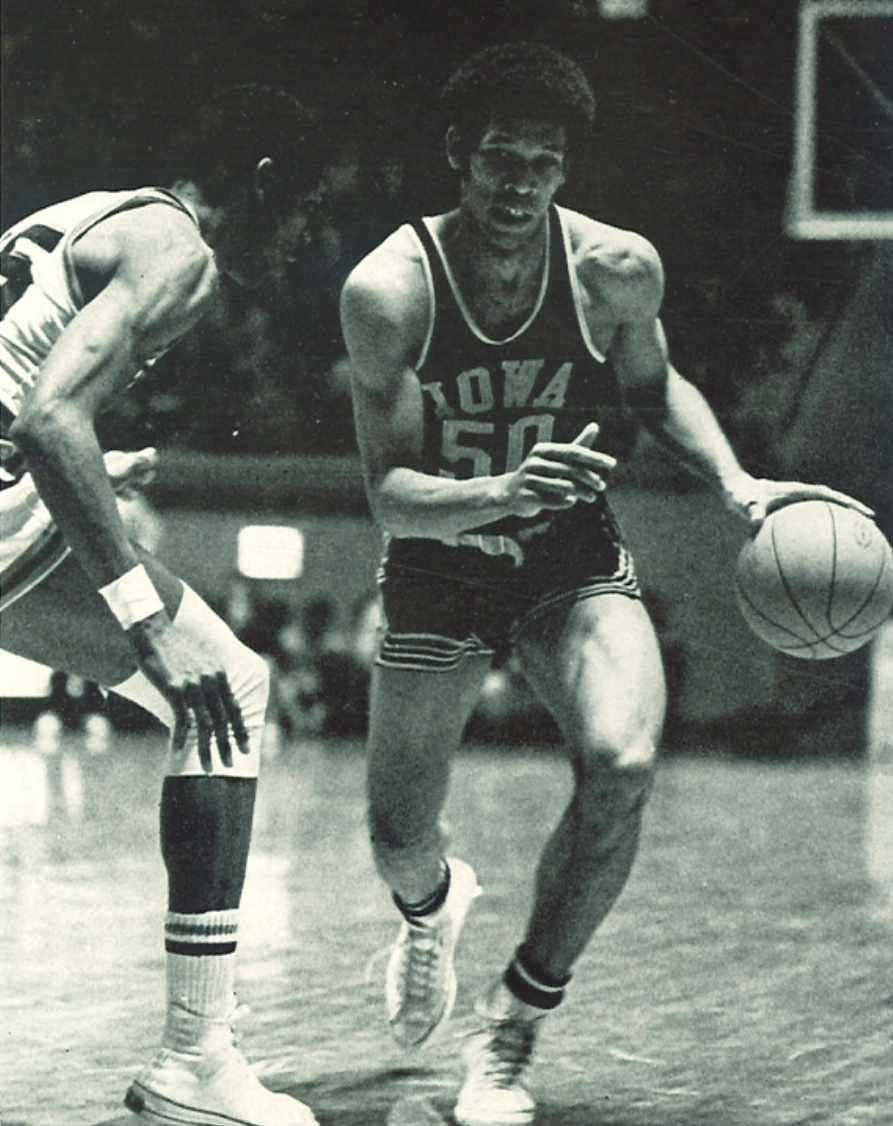
John Johnson, Iowa 1970. Johnson was the #7 overall pick in the 1970 NBA draft. University of Iowa yearbook.

The Six-Pack team was led by John Johnson and "Downtown" Fred Brown, who both enjoyed long and successful NBA careers after playing for the Hawkeyes, Johnson was the 1st round pick (#7) overall of the Cleveland Cavaliers in the 1970 NBA draft. Glenn "the Stick" Vidnovic and Chad Calabria also were Six-pack members. Iowa averaged almost 80% accuracy as a team from the free throw line for the season.

Miller left Iowa after the 1969–70 season to accept the head coaching job at Oregon State, where he coached until 1989. Miller was inducted into the Naismith Basketball Hall of Fame in 1998.

Year	School	Coach	Record	Conference	Big Ten Rank	Postseason
1964–65	Iowa	Ralph Miller	14–10	8–6	5th	
1965–66	Iowa	Ralph Miller	17–7	8–6	3rd	
1966–67	Iowa	Ralph Miller	16–8	9–5	3rd	
1967–68	Iowa	Ralph Miller	16–9	10–4	1st	
1968–69	Iowa	Ralph Miller	12–12	5–9	8th	
1969–70	Iowa	Ralph Miller	20–5	14–0	1st	NCAA SWEET 16
Totals			95–51 (.651)	54–30 (.643)		

=== Dick Schultz era (1970–1974) ===
Miller and Scheuerman's assistant (and Iowa's baseball coach), Dick Schultz, succeeded Miller as head coach in 1970. A dual coach, Schultz had previously coached the Iowa Hawkeyes baseball team, going 129–106 from 1963 to 1970. Schultz was 41–55 overall during his four-year run as coach, with "Downtown" Freddie Brown and Kevin Kunnert becoming First Round NBA Draft Picks.

Brown was the 1st round pick (#6 overall) of the Seattle SuperSonics in the 1971 NBA draft and Kunnert was the 1st round pick (#12 overall) of the Chicago Bulls in 1973 NBA draft.

Schultz resigned in 1974, after four second-division finishes in the Big Ten and a 41–55 overall record. Schultz later became the executive director of the National Collegiate Athletic Association (NCAA) from 1988 to 1993. He then became executive director of the United States Olympic Committee (USOC) from 1995 to 2000.

Year	School	Coach	Record	Conference	Big Ten Rank	Postseason
1970–71	Iowa	Dick Schultz	9–15	4–10	7th (T)	
1971–72	Iowa	Dick Schultz	11–13	5–9	8th (T)	
1972–73	Iowa	Dick Schultz	13–11	6–8	6th (T)	
1973–74	Iowa	Dick Schultz	8–16	5–9	7th	
Totals			41–55 (.427)	20–36 (.357)		

=== Lute Olson era (1974–1983) ===
Iowa hired Long Beach State coach Lute Olson to replace Schultz in 1974. After progressive improvements from 1975 to 1977, Olson coached the Hawkeyes to five consecutive NCAA Tournament appearances from 1979 to 1983. The 1978–79 squad earned a share the Big Ten Title.

==== 1980 Final Four ====
Olson's tenure was highlighted by an appearance in the Final Four in 1980 on a team led by Ronnie Lester, with a supporting cast of Kenny Arnold, Steve Waite, Steve Krafcisin, Vince Brookins, Kevin Boyle, Bobby Hanson, and Mark Gannon. Iowa started 7–0 on the season when Lester was injured early in the season at Dayton, not returning until the regular season finale.

Nineteen regular season wins earned Iowa a No. 5 seed in the East Regional of the NCAA Tournament (then, a 48-team field). In the four tournament wins that took Iowa to the Final Four, All-American Lester dished out 26 assists while committing only seven turnovers along with 51 points. Iowa opened by defeating Virginia Commonwealth 86–72 and No. 4 seed NC State 77–64. In a huge upset, Iowa knocked off No. 1 seed Syracuse 88–77, setting up a matchup in the Elite Eight with No. 3 Georgetown. Iowa earned an improbable Final Four trip to Indianapolis on March 16, 1980, defeating John Thompson's Georgetown squad 81–80. Iowa overcame a 10-point halftime deficit, making 17 of their final 21 shots and going 15–15 from the free-throw line. The winning basket was Steve Waite's three-point play in the closing seconds.

In the semi-final game against Denny Crum's Louisville team, Lester scored the first 10 points for Iowa. But after eight minutes of play he reinjured his knee and exited the game, ending his Iowa career. In Lester's absence, Louisville bested Iowa by only eight points, 80–72 and went on to win the Tournament, defeating UCLA, led by Larry Brown, in the final. Lester's value to his team was evident in the numbers. Not counting the Louisville game, they were 15–1 with Lester and 8–9 without him. Hall of Famer Earvin "Magic" Johnson, who played two seasons at Michigan State, once claimed Lester the toughest opponent he ever faced in the Big Ten. Lester was drafted 10th overall in the 1980 NBA draft, but the knee issues limited him in the NBA. He donated $100,000 to the University of Iowa in 2009.

==== Career at Iowa ====
After Olson coached the Hawkeyes to the 1980 Final Four, Iowa made the next three NCAA Tournaments. They advanced to the Sweet Sixteen in the 1983 NCAA tournament, his final season at Iowa. Then nicknamed "The House That Lute Built", Carver-Hawkeye Arena opened on January 5, 1983, replacing the Iowa Field House. After the 1982–1983 season, Olson left Iowa for the University of Arizona. Olson was inducted into the Naismith Basketball Hall of Fame in 2002.

Year	School	Coach	Record	Conference	Big Ten Rank	Postseason
1974–75	Iowa	Lute Olson	10–16	7–11	7th	
1975–76	Iowa	Lute Olson	19–10	9–9	5th	
1976–77	Iowa	Lute Olson	20–7	12–6	4th	
1977–78	Iowa	Lute Olson	12–15	5–13	8th	
1978–79	Iowa	Lute Olson	20–8	13–5	T-1st	NCAA first round
1979–80	Iowa	Lute Olson	23–10	10–8	4th	NCAA Final Four
1980–81	Iowa	Lute Olson	21–7	13–5	4th	NCAA first round
1981–82	Iowa	Lute Olson	21–8	12–6	2nd	NCAA second round
1982–83	Iowa	Lute Olson	21–10	10–8	T-2nd	NCAA Sweet Sixteen
Total			167–91 (.651)	91–71 (.562)		

=== George Raveling era (1983–1986) ===
When Lute Olson left for Arizona, George Raveling came to Iowa from Washington State, where he coached from 1972 to 1983. Raveling immediately recruited Michigan high school stars B. J. Armstrong, Bill Jones, and Roy Marble, Springfield, Illinois' Lanphier High School teammates Ed Horton and Kevin Gamble, as well as USC transfer Gerry Wright, and Les Jepsen, all of whom would go on to play in the NBA. During Raveling's three years with the Iowa program, the Hawkeyes made two trips to the NCAA Tournament, after his first Iowa team finished 13–15. Like Sam Barry decades before, Raveling left Iowa after the 1985–86 season to take the head coaching position at the University of Southern California after compiling a record of 55–38 at Iowa. Raveling was inducted into the Naismith Basketball Hall of Fame in 2015.

Year	School	Coach	Record	Conference	Big Ten Rank	Postseason
1983–84	Iowa	George Raveling	13–15	6–12	T-7th	
1984–85	Iowa	George Raveling	21–11	10–8	5th	NCAA first round
1985–86	Iowa	George Raveling	20–12	10–8	6th	NCAA first round
Totals			55–38 (.591)	26–28 (.481)		

=== Tom Davis era (1986–1999) ===
Dr. Tom Davis was hired after George Raveling departed. Davis coached the Hawkeyes for 13 seasons from 1986–87 to 1998–99. Davis had coached Lafayette (1971–1977), Boston College (1977–1982) and Stanford (1982–1986) prior to Iowa. Davis is Iowa's all time victory leader with 269 wins.

Davis utilized a full court press defense and rapid continuous substitution. In 1986–1987, the Hawkeyes won their first 18 games and obtained the No. 1 ranking in the AP and UPI polls for the first time in school history. Iowa, with future NBA players Brad Lohaus, B. J. Armstrong, Ed Horton, Kevin Gamble, Bill Jones and Roy Marble, along with Jeff Moe won a school-record 30 games. Iowa finished 14–4 in the Big Ten and advanced to the Elite Eight of the NCAA tournament.

In the 1987 NCAA tournament #2 seed Iowa defeated Santa Clara 96–76, UTEP 84–82 and Oklahoma 93–91 to advance to the Elite Eight. In the Western Regional Final Iowa lost to #1 seed UNLV 84–81 after having a 16-point halftime lead. Kevin Gamble, who had hit the winning shot against the University of Oklahoma to send the Hawkeyes to the Elite Eight, shot a 3–pointer as time expired, but the shot bounced off the rim.

Retaining B. J. Armstrong, Ed Horton, Bill Jones and Roy Marble, the Hawkeyes began the 1987–88 season ranked in the top five by most polls and publications. Iowa advanced to the Sweet Sixteen, avenging their loss to UNLV in the Second Round 106–89, before losing 99–79 to former coach Lute Olson's Arizona Wildcats.

On January 16, 1993, Iowa player Chris Street, a junior averaging 14.5 points and 9.5 rebounds on Iowa's 12–2 team, was killed in an accident with a snow plow in Iowa City. His # 40 was retired by Iowa.

In all, Davis led the Hawkeyes to nine NCAA Tournaments, winning every First Round game in the process. In his final season, Iowa advanced to the Sweet Sixteen before losing to eventual National Champion UConn. Under Davis the Hawkeyes also made two appearances in the National Invitational Tournament. He is the all–time winningest coach in Iowa history with 269 wins. He would later come out of retirement to rebuild the Drake University program before being succeeded at Drake by his son Keno Davis.

Year	School	Coach	Record	Conference	Big Ten Rank	Postseason
1986–87	Iowa	Tom Davis	30–5	14–4	3rd	NCAA Elite Eight
1987–88	Iowa	Tom Davis	24–10	12–6	3rd	NCAA Sweet Sixteen
1988–89	Iowa	Tom Davis	23–10	10–8	4th	NCAA second round
1989–90	Iowa	Tom Davis	12–16	4–14	T–8th	
1990–91	Iowa	Tom Davis	21–11	9–9	T–5th	NCAA second round
1991–92	Iowa	Tom Davis	19–11	10–8	5th	NCAA second round
1992–93	Iowa	Tom Davis	23–9	11–7	T–3rd	NCAA second round
1993–94	Iowa	Tom Davis	11–16	5–13	T–9th	
1994–95	Iowa	Tom Davis	21–12	9–9	T–7th	NIT third round
1995–96	Iowa	Tom Davis	23–9	11–7	4th	NCAA second round
1996–97	Iowa	Tom Davis	22–10	12–6	T–2nd	NCAA second round
1997–98	Iowa	Tom Davis	20–11	9–7	T–5th	NIT first round
1998–99	Iowa	Tom Davis	20–10	9–7	T–3rd	NCAA Sweet Sixteen
Totals			269–140 (.658)	125–105 (.543)		

=== Steve Alford era (1999–2007) ===
Steve Alford, a former All-American as an Indiana Hoosier and a member of the Olympic gold-winning 1984 United States basketball team, arrived at Iowa after coaching Southwest Missouri State University to the 1999 NCAA Tournament Sweet 16. In his first game as coach of the Hawkeyes, Iowa defeated the defending national champion and No. 1-ranked Connecticut Huskies in Madison Square Garden. Iowa finished 14–16.

During his second year (2000–01) the Hawkeyes' roster included Indiana transfer Luke Recker and Reggie Evans, who would lead the Big Ten Conference in rebounds and double-doubles during his two seasons with Iowa, as well as Iowa Mr. basketball 1997 Dean Oliver. However, after a knee injury sidelined Recker, the Hawkeyes dropped six of their last seven conference games, finishing 23–12 for the regular season and 7–9 in the Big Ten Conference regular season. Despite the setback, they battled back and won the Big Ten Conference tournament with four straight wins against Northwestern, Ohio State, Penn State, and Indiana. This earned them a #7 seed in the 2001 NCAA tournament, where they defeated Creighton in the first round but lost to Kentucky in the second round.

The Hawkeyes' conference record dropped to 5–11 during the 2001–02 season, but they defeated Purdue, Wisconsin, and Indiana in the Big Ten tournament before losing to Ohio State in the finals. The Hawkeyes played in the 2002 National Invitation Tournament, losing to LSU in the first round to finish with a 19–16 record. This was the first of three straight seasons that the Hawkeyes played in the NIT under Alford.

Iowa won the first two rounds of the 2003 tournament against Valparaiso and Iowa State before losing to Georgia Tech, finishing with a 17–14 record. In 2004, they returned to the NIT, losing to St. Louis in the first round to complete the season at 16–13. Their 9–7 conference record marked the first winning Big Ten Conference record under Alford.

The Hawkeyes finished 21–12 with a 7–9 conference record in the 2004–05 regular season. They won their first two Big Ten tournament games against Purdue and Michigan State before losing the third game to Wisconsin, 59–56. They earned an at-large invitation to the 2005 NCAA tournament as a #10 seed, where they lost 76–64 to Cincinnati in the first round. During the season, leading scorer Pierre Pierce was dismissed from the team amid charges of sexual abuse; Pierce ultimately served one year in prison.

During the 2005–06 season, the Hawkeyes went undefeated at Carver-Hawkeye Arena for the first time in school history and finished in a second-place tie with Illinois with an 11–5 conference record, one game behind Ohio State. However, the Hawkeyes defeated Minnesota, Michigan State, and Ohio State to win the Big Ten tournament and finish 25–8 going into its third NCAA Tournament under Alford. They were ranked No. 11 nationally and seeded #3 in the Atlanta Regional of the 2006 NCAA tournament, but lost in a first-round upset to #14 seed Northwestern State 64–63, leaving Alford with only one NCAA Tournament win since taking over at Iowa. The game was lost on a last-second shot, and the Hawkeyes would not return to the Round of 64 in the NCAA Tournament until 2014–15.

During the 2006–07 season, Alford led the Hawkeyes to an 8–6 non-conference record (which included a home loss to Drake for the first time in 40 years) and a 9–7 record in the Big Ten Conference. Iowa was not invited to the post-season, marking the first time since the 1976–77 season that a Hawkeye team with a winning record (17–14) failed to make either the NCAA Tournament or the NIT.

At the conclusion of the 2006–07 season, Alford resigned from the University of Iowa to accept the coaching position at the University of New Mexico.

Year	School	Coach	Record	Conference	Big Ten Rank	Postseason
1999–00	Iowa	Steve Alford	14–16	6–10	T–7th	
2000–01	Iowa	Steve Alford	23–12	7–9	T–6th	NCAA second round
2001–02	Iowa	Steve Alford	19–16	5–11	T–8th	NIT 1st Round
2002–03	Iowa	Steve Alford	17–14	7–9	T–8th	NIT Elite Eight
2003–04	Iowa	Steve Alford	16–13	9–7	4th	NIT 1st Round
2004–05	Iowa	Steve Alford	21–12	7–9	7th	NCAA 1st Round
2005–06	Iowa	Steve Alford	25–9	11–5	T–2nd	NCAA 1st Round
2006–07	Iowa	Steve Alford	17–14	9–7	T–4th	
Total			152–106 (.589)	61–67 (.477)		

=== Todd Lickliter era (2007–2010) ===
Following Alford's departure, Butler coach and reigning NABC Coach of the Year Todd Lickliter was hired. The graduation of Adam Haluska and the transfer of leading scorer Tyler Smith to Tennessee created a void. The 2007–2008 Hawkeyes finished 13–19, 6–12 in the Big Ten. The 2008–09 Hawkeyes improved to 15–17. The 2009–10 Hawkeyes dropped to 10–22. After the worst three-year run in the program's history, Lickliter was fired on March 15, 2010.

Year	School	Coach	Record	Conference	Big Ten Rank	Postseason
2007–08	Iowa	Todd Lickliter	13–19	6–12	8th	
2008–09	Iowa	Todd Lickliter	15–16	5–13	10th	
2009–10	Iowa	Todd Lickliter	10–22	4–14	9th	
Total			38–57 (.400)	15–39 (.278)		

=== Fran McCaffery era (2010–2025) ===
Coach Fran McCaffery came to Iowa from Siena in 2010. In his 23rd season as a head coach at Iowa, Lehigh (1985–1988), UNC-Greensboro (1999–2005) and Siena (2005–2010), McCaffery has a career record of 424–308 (.583).

Iowa's attendance increased by 20 percent from the previous year. McCaffery guided Iowa to two victories over top–50 RPI teams, including sixth–ranked Purdue.

In 2012 the Hawkeyes were 4–3 against teams ranked in the AP top 25. For the second consecutive year, the Iowa Men's Basketball program saw a marked uptick in attendance inside Carver-Hawkeye Arena. Iowa's average attendance for all home games for the 2011–12 season was 11,841, the conference-only attendance was 13,254 per game.

During the 2012–2013 season Iowa finished the regular season with a 20–11 record, including an 11–2 non conference and 9–9 conference record. Coach McCaffery also earned his 300th career win as a head coach on March 9, 2013, with a 74–60 win over Nebraska. In postseason play they defeated Northwestern in the Big Ten tournament before falling to the #3 seeded Michigan State Spartans in the second round. The Hawkeyes went on to earn a #3 seed in the 2013 NIT tournament where they would go advance to the championship game for the first time in school history before losing to Baylor (74–54). Iowa's 25 win total was the most by the team since setting the same mark in the 2005–2006 season.

During the 2013–2014 season, Iowa achieved a non-conference record of 11–2, including a runner-up finish in the 2013 Battle 4 Atlantis tournament and a loss to in–state rival Iowa State. The Hawkeyes finished the Big Ten Conference season with a 9–9 record and a regular season record of 20–12. The Hawkeyes were seeded sixth in the Big Ten Conference tournament but lost to No. 11-seeded Northwestern 67–62, a team that the Hawkeyes had twice beaten by 26 points in two conference season games. The Hawkeyes played in the 'first four' during the 2014 NCAA Division I men's basketball tournament, playing Tennessee in the first round of the 2014 NCAA Division I men's basketball tournament. This was their first NCAA Tournament appearance since the 2005–2006 season.

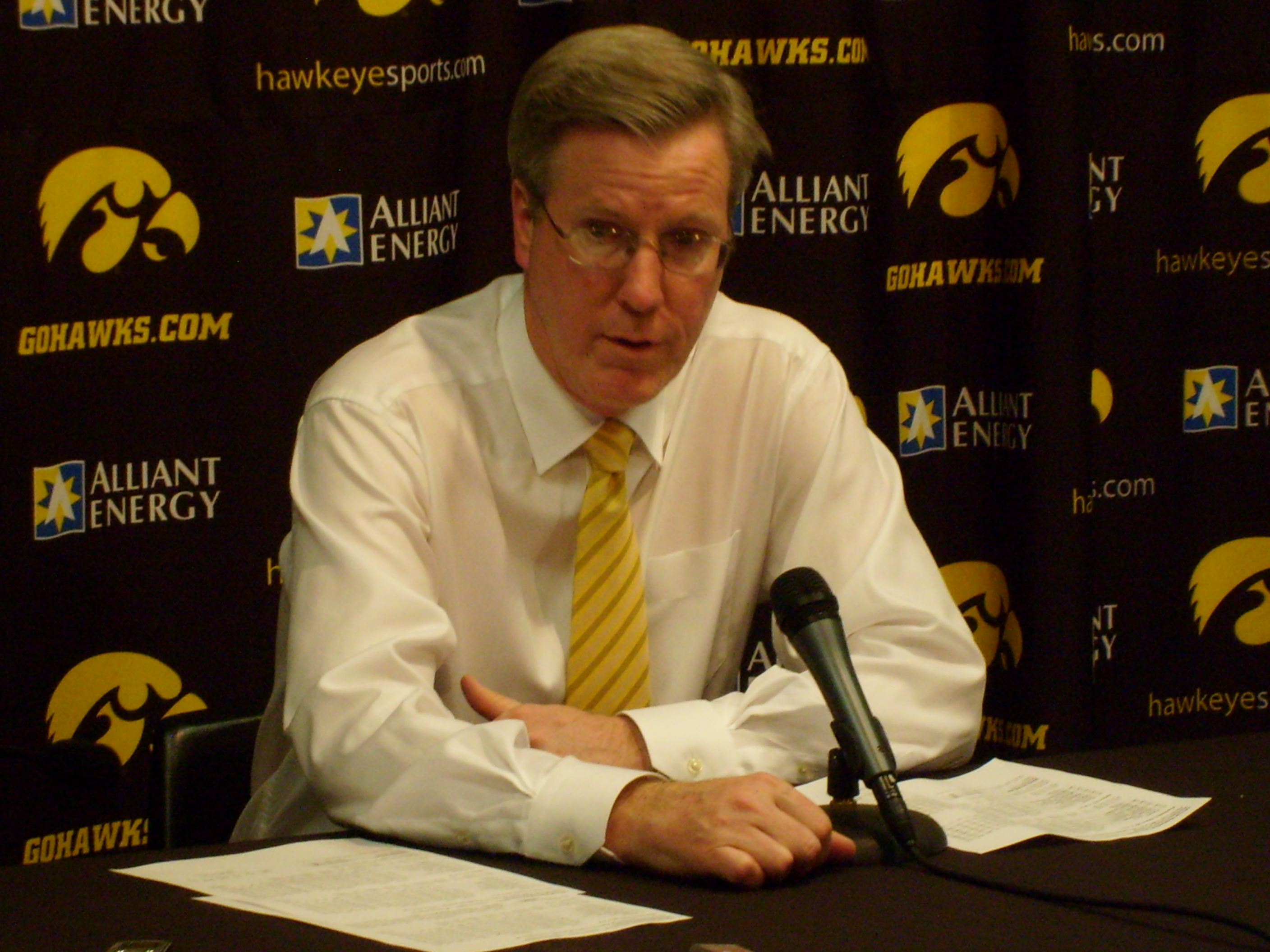
Fran McCaffery, 2010

The 2014–2015 Hawkeyes finished their non–conference schedule 9–4, with losses to #10 Texas (71–57) and #23 Syracuse (66–63) in the 2K Classic. Additional non-conference losses came at the hands of rivals #14 Iowa State (90–75) and UNI (56–44). McCaffery led Iowa to a 12–6 record in the Big Ten, including memorable wins over #20 Ohio State (71–65) and #17 Maryland (71–55). McCaffrey's Hawkeyes were upset in the second round of the Big Ten tournament by Penn State (67–58), but still finished tied for third in the conference. Iowa earned a 7th seed in the NCAA Tournament and beat Davidson (83–52) in the Round of 64 before bowing out to Gonzaga (87–68) in the third round. McCaffery's Hawkeyes finished 22–12 on the year.

During the 2015–16 season, the University of Iowa reached a new peak during the McCaffery era, twice defeating Michigan State during the regular season, attaining a 19–4 overall record and a No. 3 Associated Press rankings. However, the Hawkeyes lost seven of their last 10 games, including a 68–66 loss to 12th-seeded Illinois in the second round of the Big Ten Conference tournament, a team the Hawkeyes had defeated handily a month earlier and would not play in the post–season. As a result of the late–season swoon, the Hawkeyes fell to No. 25 in the final Associated Press rankings. Seeded seventh in the NCAA Division I tournament's South regional, the Hawkeyes used a buzzer-beating tip-in to defeat Temple 72–70 in overtime. The Hawkeyes lost to second–seeded Villanova in the second round, 87–68, to end the season 22–11.

After the 2015–16 season graduated 4 senior starters, Iowa got off to a rocky start to the 2016–17 campaign, going 3–5 with losses to Seton Hall (91–83), Virginia (74–41), Memphis (100–92), Notre Dame (92–78), and Nebraska–Omaha (98–89). The Hawkeyes turned things around in December and ended non-conference play with five straight victories, including wins over in-state rivals #25 Iowa State (78–64) and UNI (69–46). Iowa finished non-conference play 8–5 on the year. The Hawkeyes went 10–8 in conference play, with wins over Michigan (86–83), #17 Purdue (83–78), Ohio State (85–72), #24 Maryland (83–69), Indiana (96–90), and #22 Wisconsin (59–57). McCaffery's Hawkeyes were invited to the NIT post-season tournament and defeated South Dakota (87–75) before losing in overtime to eventual champion TCU (94–92), finishing their season 19–15. Senior Peter Jok lead the Big Ten in scoring (19.9 ppg) and was first-team all–conference.

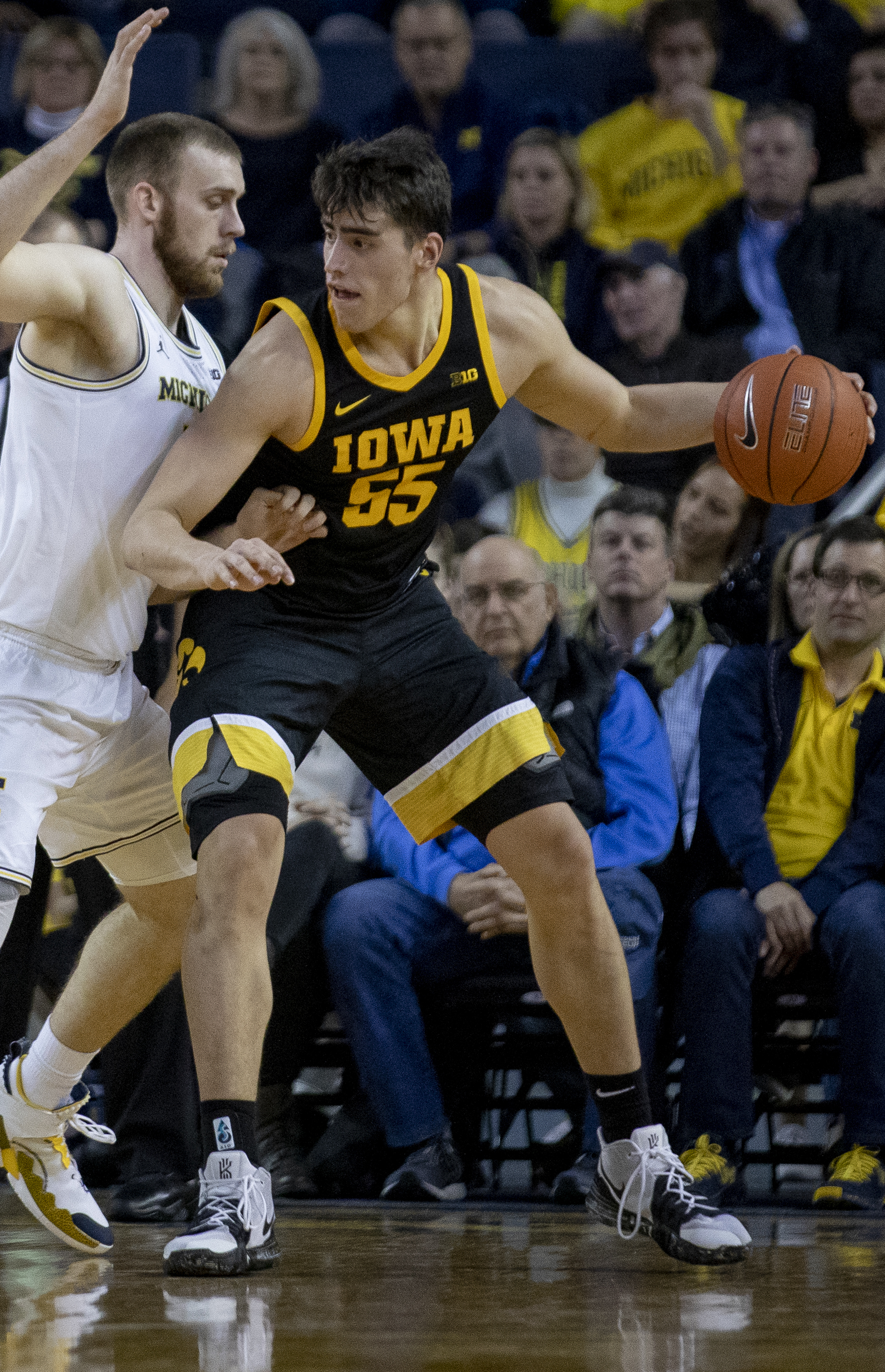
Luka Garza was Sporting News Player of the Year in 2020.

The 2017–18 season was a disaster for the Hawkeyes. After losing the Big Ten leading scorer, Peter Jok, a young Iowa team struggled to find their identity. Coach McCaffery's eldest son, Connor, joined the team as an ESPN four–star recruit out of local Iowa City West, but battled a series of ailments, including mononucleosis, which lead to being granted a medical redshirt year. Iowa finished the season 14–19, 4–14 in Big Ten play in a three-way tie for 11th place. As the No. 12 seed in the Big Ten tournament, they defeated Illinois before losing to Michigan in the second round.

In 2018–19 a young Iowa team won the 2K Sports Classic early in the season, defeating #13 Oregon (77–69) and UCONN (91–72) in back–to–back nights at Madison Square Garden. The Hawkeyes would go undefeated in non–conference play, with wins over in–state rivals Iowa State (98–84) and UNI (77–54). They also scored a whopping 68 points in the first half of a 105–78 win over Alabama State and beat Savannah State by 46 (110–64). Iowa's season featured several thrilling contests, including a 1-point victory over Pitt (69–68), and buzzer-beating wins in back–to–back games against Northwestern (80–79) and Rutgers (71–69). Iowa just missed a chance to make it three last–second victories in a row, but a shot as time expired rimmed out against #24 Maryland (66–65). Other notable regular season victories for Iowa included wins over #24 Nebraska (93–84), #16 Ohio State (72–62), and #5 Michigan (74–59). The Hawkeyes ended the regular season on a 4–game losing streak. In the Big Ten tournament, Iowa defeated Illinois before falling to Michigan. The Hawkeyes earned the No. 10 seed in the South Regional in the NCAA Tournament. In the first round, the Hawkeyes came from behind to upset seventh-seed Cincinnati (79–72). Then, Iowa faced off against second seed Tennessee in the Round of 32. The Hawkeyes came back from a 25-point deficit in the first half to send the game to overtime, which was won by Tennessee.

The 2019–20 season saw Iowa complete a 9–2 non-conference schedule with notable wins over rival Iowa State (84–68), and #12 ranked Texas Tech (72–61). The Iowa squad was led by standout center Luka Garza, who averaged 23.9 points and 9.8 rebounds en route to numerous accolades. Garza would go on to win the Big Ten Player of the Year, Sporting News Men's College Basketball Player of the Year, Pete Newell Big Man Award, Kareem Abdul-Jabbar Award, and consensus All-American honors while leading the Hawkeyes to a 20–11 record that featured conference wins over #12 Maryland (67–49), #19 Michigan (90–83), #24 Rutgers (85–80), #19 Illinois (72–65), #25 Ohio State (85–76), and #16 Penn State (77–68). The 2019–20 season ended abruptly – without a postseason being played – with the outbreak of COVID-19. McCaffery's younger son, Patrick, another ESPN four–star recruit, joined the team as a freshman but took a medical redshirt while recovering from the residual effects thyroid cancer treatment.

Season	School	Coach	Overall	Big Ten	Big Ten Rank	Postseason
2010–11	Iowa	Fran McCaffery	11–20	4–14	10th	
2011–12	Iowa	Fran McCaffery	18–17	8–10	7th	NIT 2nd Round
2012–13	Iowa	Fran McCaffery	25–13	9–9	6th	NIT Runner-Up
2013–14	Iowa	Fran McCaffery	20–13	9–9	6th	NCAA Play-in Round
2014–15	Iowa	Fran McCaffery	22–12	12–6	3rd(T)	NCAA 2nd Round
2015–16	Iowa	Fran McCaffery	22–11	12–6	3rd(T)	NCAA 2nd Round
2016–17	Iowa	Fran McCaffery	19–15	10–8	5th(T)	NIT 2nd Round
2017–18	Iowa	Fran McCaffery	14–19	4–14	11th(T)	
2018–19	Iowa	Fran McCaffery	23–12	10–10	6th	NCAA 2nd Round
2019–20	Iowa	Fran McCaffery	20–11	11–9	5th(T)	NCAA Tournament cancelled due to COVID-19
2020–21	Iowa	Fran McCaffery	22–9	14–6	3rd	NCAA 2nd Round
2021–22	Iowa	Fran McCaffery	26–10	12–8	5th	NCAA 1st Round
2022–23	Iowa	Fran McCaffery	19–14	11–9	5th	NCAA 1st Round
2023–24	Iowa	Fran McCaffery	19–15	10–10	6th(T)	NIT 2nd Round
2024–25	Iowa	Fran McCaffery	17–16	7–13	12th(T)	Declined
Total			297–207 (.589)	143–141 (.504)		

=== Ben McCollum era (2025–present) ===
Season	School	Coach	Overall	Big Ten	Big Ten Rank	Postseason
2025–26	Iowa	Ben McCollum	24–13	10–10	9th	NCAA Elite Eight
Total			24–13 (.649)	10–10 (.500)		

== Iowa basketball coaches ==
The Hawkeyes have had 22 coaches in their 118-year history. Fran McCaffery was the coach until March 14, 2025. Two coaches have been named Big Ten Conference Coach-of-the-Year since it officially began in 1975: Lute Olson in 1979 and Tom Davis in 1987. Four Iowa coaches have been inducted into the Naismith Basketball Hall of Fame: Sam Barry, Ralph Miller, Lute Olson and George Raveling.

== Head-to-head Big Ten records since 1949–50 ==
Note: Through 2024–25 season

Team	Total meetings	Overall record	Win %
Illinois	135	62–73	.459
Indiana	134	63–71	.470
Michigan	135	55–80	.407
Michigan State	134	58–76	.433
Minnesota	136	76–60	.559
Northwestern	133	99–34	.744
Ohio State	136	70–66	.515
Purdue	130	57–73	.438
Wisconsin	131	68–63	.519
Penn State	56	35–21	.625
Nebraska	31	20–11	.645
Maryland	18	8–10	.444
Rutgers	17	14–3	.824
Oregon	9	6-3	.667
UCLA	9	5-4	.556
USC	8	5-3	.625
Washington	6	3-3	.500

== Postseason ==
=== NCAA tournament results ===
The Hawkeyes have appeared in the NCAA tournament 30 times. Their combined record is 34–32.

Year	Seed	Round	Opponent	Results
1955		Sweet Sixteen; Elite Eight; Final Four; National 3rd Place Game	Penn State; Marquette; La Salle; Colorado	W 82–53; W 86–81; L 73–76; L 54–75
1956		Sweet Sixteen; Elite Eight; Final Four; National Championship Game	Morehead State; Kentucky; Temple; San Francisco	W 97–83; W 89–77; W 83–76; L 71–83
1970		Sweet Sixteen; Regional third place Game	Jacksonville; Notre Dame	L 103–104; W 121–106
1979	No. 4	Second Round	No. 5 Toledo	L 72–74
1980	No. 5	First Round; Second Round; Sweet Sixteen; Elite Eight; Final Four; National Third Place Game	No. 12 VCU; No. 4 NC State; No. 1 Syracuse; No. 3 Georgetown; No. 2 Louisville; No. 6 Purdue	W 86–72; W 77–64; W 88–77; W 81–80; L 72–80; L 58–75
1981	No. 3	Second Round	No. 6 Wichita State	L 56–60
1982	No. 6	First Round; Second Round	No. 11 Northeast Louisiana; No. 3 Idaho	W 70–63; L 67–69 ^{OT}
1983	No. 7	First Round; Second Round; Sweet Sixteen	No. 10 Utah State; No. 2 Missouri; No. 3 Villanova	W 64–59; W 77–63; L 54–55
1985	No. 8	First Round	No. 9 Arkansas	L 54–63
1986	No. 11	First Round	No. 6 NC State	L 64–66
1987	No. 2	First Round; Second Round; Sweet Sixteen; Elite Eight	No. 15 Santa Clara; No. 7 UTEP; No. 6 Oklahoma; No. 1 UNLV	W 99–76; W 84–82; W 93–91 ^{OT} L 81–84
1988	No. 5	First Round; Second Round; Sweet Sixteen	No. 12 Florida State; No. 4 UNLV; No. 1 Arizona	W 102–98; W 104–86; L 79–99
1989	No. 4	First Round; Second Round	No. 13 Rutgers; No. 5 NC State	W 87–73; L 96–102 ^{2OT}
1991	No. 7	First Round; Second Round	No. 10 East Tennessee State; No. 2 Duke	W 76–73; L 70–85
1992	No. 9	First Round; Second Round	No. 8 Texas; No. 1 Duke	W 98–92; L 62–75
1993	No. 4	First Round; Second Round	No. 13 Northeast Louisiana; No. 5 Wake Forest	W 82–69; L 78–84
1996	No. 6	First Round; Second Round	No. 11 George Washington; No. 3 Arizona	W 81–79; L 73–87
1997	No. 8	First Round; Second Round	No. 9 Virginia; No. 1 Kentucky	W 73–60; L 69–75
1999	No. 5	First Round; Second Round; Sweet Sixteen	No. 12 UAB; No. 4 Arkansas; No. 1 Connecticut	W 77–64; W 82–72; L 68–78
2001	No. 7	First Round; Second Round	No. 10 Creighton; No. 2 Kentucky	W 69–56; L 79–92
2005	No. 10	First Round	No. 7 Cincinnati	L 64–76
2006	No. 3	First Round	No. 14 Northwestern State	L 63–64
2014	No. 11	First Four	No. 11 Tennessee	L 65–78 ^{OT}
2015	No. 7	First Round; Second Round	No. 10 Davidson; No. 2 Gonzaga	W 83–52; L 68–87
2016	No. 7	First Round; Second Round	No. 10 Temple; No. 2 Villanova	W 72–70 ^{OT} L 68–87
2019	No. 10	First Round; Second Round	No. 7 Cincinnati; No. 2 Tennessee	W 79–72; L 77–83 ^{OT}
2021	No. 2	First Round; Second Round	No. 15 Grand Canyon; No. 7 Oregon	W 86–74; L 80–95
2022	No. 5	First Round	No. 12 Richmond	L 63–67
2023	No. 8	First Round	No. 9 Auburn	L 75–83
2026	No. 9	First Round; Second Round; Sweet Sixteen; Elite Eight	No. 8 Clemson; No. 1 Florida; No. 4 Nebraska; No. 3 Illinois	W 67–61; W 73–72; W 77–71; L 59–71

*Following the introduction of the "First Four" round in 2011, the Round of 64 and Round of 32 were referred to as the Second Round and Third Round, respectively, from 2011 to 2015. Then from 2016 moving forward, the Round 64 and Round of 32 were once again called the First and Second rounds, as they were prior to 2011.

=== Historical NCAA tournament seeding ===
The NCAA began seeding the tournament with the 1979 edition.

Years →	'79	'80	'81	'82	'83	'85	'86	'87	'88	'89	'91	'92	'93	'96	'97	'99	'01	'05	'06	'14	'15	'16	'19	'21	'22	'23	'26
Seeds →	4	5	3	6	7	8	11	2	5	4	7	9	4	6	8	5	7	10	3	11	7	7	10	2	5	8	9

=== NIT results ===
The Hawkeyes have appeared in the National Invitation Tournament (NIT) eight times. Their combined record is 10–8.

Year	Round	Opponent	Result
1995	First Round; Second Round; Quarterfinals	DePaul; Ohio; Penn State	W 96–87; W 66–62; L 64–67
1998	First Round	Georgia	L 93–100
2002	First Round	LSU	L 61–63
2003	Opening Round; First Round; Second Round	Valparaiso; Iowa State; Georgia Tech	W 62–60; W 54–53; L 78–79
2004	First Round	Saint Louis	L 69–70
2012	First Round; Second Round	Dayton; Oregon	W 84–72; L 97–108
2013	First Round; Second Round; Quarterfinals; Semifinals; Final	Indiana State; Stony Brook; Virginia; Maryland; Baylor	W 68–52; W 75–63; W 75–64; W 71–60; L 54–74
2017	First Round; Second Round	South Dakota; TCU	W 87–75; L 92–94^{OT}
2024	First Round; Second Round	Kansas State; Utah	W 91–82; L 82–91

== Individual honors ==
=== National Player of the Year ===
Player	Year	Award(s)
Luka Garza	2020	Sporting News
Luka Garza	2021	Consensus national player of the year: Sporting News; John R. Wooden Award; Naismith; Associated Press; Oscar Robertson Trophy; NABC

=== Retired numbers ===
The following Hawkeye players have had their numbers retired by the University of Iowa:

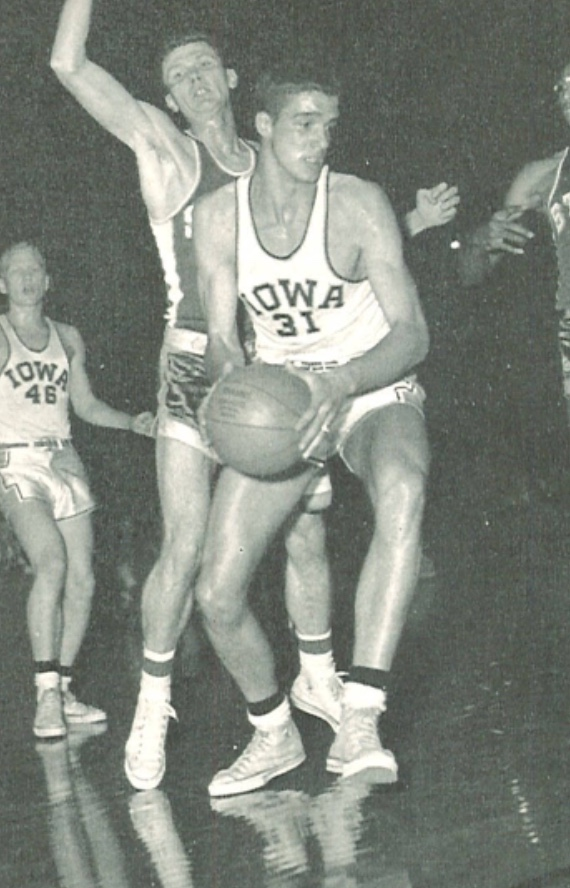
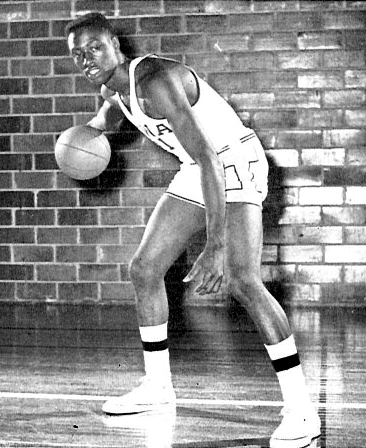
Bill Logan (left) and Carl Cain are some of the Hawkeyes to have their numbers retired.

Iowa Hawkeyes retired numbers
No.	Player	Pos.	Tenure	No. ret.	Ref.
12	Ronnie Lester	PG	1976–80	1980	
21	Carl Cain	G	1953–56	1980	
22	Bill Seaberg	G	1953–56	1980	
31	Bill Logan	C	1953–56	1980	
33	Bill Schoof	C	1953–56	1980	
40	Chris Street	PF	1990–93	1993	
41	Greg Stokes	PF	1981–85	1985	
46	Sharm Scheuerman	G	1953–56	1980	
55	Luka Garza	C	2017–21	2021	

=== Honored jerseys ===
The jersey was retired but the number is still active for use.

**Iowa Hawkeyes honored jerseys**
No.	Player	Pos.	Tenure	Hon.
**10**	B. J. Armstrong	PG	1985–89	1992
**23**	Roy Marble	SG	1985–1989	2022

=== All-American selections ===
Each year, numerous publications and organizations release lists of All-America teams, hypothetical rosters of players considered the best in the nation at their respective positions. The National Collegiate Athletic Association (NCAA) uses officially recognized All-America selectors to determine the consensus selections. Over time, the sources used to determine the consensus selections have varied. Currently, the NCAA uses four "major" selectors to determine consensus All-Americans: the Associated Press, The National Association of Basketball Coaches, the United States Basketball Writers Association and Sporting News magazine. Since 1984, the NCAA has applied a standardized point system to those teams designated as "major" All-American teams to determine consensus teams. The point system consists of three points for first team, two points for second team and one point for third team. No honorable mention or fourth team or lower are used in the computation. The top five totals plus ties are first team and the next five plus ties are second team. Many other publications and organization compile their own "minor" All-America teams in addition to the selectors listed here.

Through the 2023 season, 16 Iowa players have earned 21 All-America selections. Of Iowa's 21 All-Americans, 5 were First-team All-American selections – all 5 were consensus First team selections. Those voted consensus (whether First or Second team) are listed in bold in the table below; 8 total.

Key
First-team selection	Second-team selection	Third-team selection

Year	Player	Remarks
1934	Ben Selzer	
1944	Dave Danner	
1944	Dick Ives	
**1945**	**Dick Ives**	2nd
**1945**	**Herb Wilkinson**	
1946	Herb Wilkinson	2nd
1946	Dick Ives	3rd
1947	Herb Wilkinson	3rd
**1948**	**Murray Wier**	
**1952**	**Charles Darling**	

Year	Player	Remarks
1962	Don Nelson	
1968	Sam Williams	
1970	John Johnson	
1971	Fred Brown	
1979	Ronnie Lester	
1997	Andre Woolridge	
2016	**Jarrod Uthoff**	
**2020**	**Luka Garza**	
**2021**	**Luka Garza**	2nd
**2022**	**Keegan Murray**	

Year	Player	Remarks
2023	Kris Murray	

=== Big Ten honorees ===
==== Big Ten Most Valuable Players ====
The Chicago Tribune Silver Basketball was awarded from 1946 to 2007 by the Chicago Tribune to the college basketball player determined to be the Most Valuable Player of the Big Ten Conference. Three Hawkeyes won the Big Ten MVP award:

Year	Player
1948	Murray Wier
1952	Charles Darling
1968	Sam Williams

==== Big Ten Players of the Year ====
Since 1985, the Big Ten Conference has named the Big Ten Conference Men's Basketball Player of the Year. The Hawkeyes' first recipient of this award was Luka Garza, who was so honored in both 2020 and 2021.

Year	Player
2020	Luka Garza
2021	Luka Garza

==== Big Ten Conference tournament Most Valuable Players ====
Since 1998, the Big Ten Conference has held an annual basketball tournament at the end of its regular season. Every year, the Big Ten Conference men's basketball tournament crowns a tournament MVP, and three Hawkeyes have won the annual honor:

Year	Player
2001	Reggie Evans
2006	Jeff Horner
2022	Keegan Murray

==== Other annual awards ====
Coaches and media of the Big Ten also make annual selections for additional individual honors:

Big Ten Conference Award	Recipient(s) and year received
Defensive Player of the Year	Acie Earl (1992); Erek Hansen (2006)
Sixth Man of the Year	Doug Thomas (2006); Gabe Olaseni (2015); Nicholas Baer (2017); Payton Sandfort (2023)
Freshman of the Year	Jess Settles (1994); Owen Freeman (2024)

==== All-conference selections ====
Through the 2023 season, Iowa has had 121 All-Big Ten selections, including 39 first-team selections. 34 players were multiple All-Big Ten selections, and nine players were three-time All-Big Ten selections.

Key
First-team selection	Second-team selection	Third-team selection

Year	Player	Remarks
1939	Ben Stephens	
1942	Milt Kuhl	
1944	Dave Danner	
1945	Herb Wilkinson	
1945	Clayton Wilkinson	
1946	Herb Wilkinson	2nd
1947	Herb Wilkinson	3rd
1948	Murray Wier	
1950	Frank Calsbeek	
1951	Frank Calsbeek	2nd
1951	Charles Darling	
1952	Charles Darling	2nd
1952	Bob Clifton	
1953	McKinley Davis	
1954	Carl Cain	
1955	Bill Logan	
1955	Carl Cain	2nd
1955	Bill Seaberg	
1955	Sharm Scheuerman	
1956	Carl Cain	3rd
1956	Bill Logan	2nd
1956	Bill Seaberg	2nd
1958	Dave Gunther	
1959	Dave Gunther	2nd
1961	Don Nelson	
1962	Don Nelson	2nd
1963	Dave Roach	
1964	Jimmy Rodgers	
1965	Chris Pervall	
1965	George Peeples	
1966	George Peeples	2nd
1966	Chris Pervall	2nd
1967	Sam Williams	
1968	Sam Williams	2nd
1968	Chad Calabria	
1970	John Johnson	
1970	Fred Brown	
1970	Glenn Vidnovic	
1971	Fred Brown	2nd

Year	Player	Remarks
1972	Kevin Kunnert	
1972	Rick Williams	
1973	Kevin Kunnert	2nd
1974	Candy LaPrince	
1976	Scott Thompson	
1976	Dan Frost	
1976	Bruce King	
1977	Bruce King	2nd
1978	Ronnie Lester	
1979	Ronnie Lester	2nd
1980	Kevin Boyle	
1980	Steve Krafcisin	
1981	Kevin Boyle	2nd
1981	Vince Brookins	
1982	Michael Payne	
1982	Kenny Arnold	
1982	Kevin Boyle	3rd
1983	Greg Stokes	
1983	Bob Hansen	
1984	Greg Stokes	2nd
1984	Steve Carfino	
1985	Greg Stokes	3rd
1986	Gerry Wright	
1987	Roy Marble	
1987	Brad Lohaus	
1988	Roy Marble	2nd
1988	B. J. Armstrong	
1989	Ed Horton	
1989	B. J. Armstrong	2nd
1989	Roy Marble	3rd
1990	Les Jepsen	
1991	Acie Earl	

Year	Player	Remarks
1992	Acie Earl	2nd
1993	Acie Earl	3rd
1993	Val Barnes	
1994	James Winters	
1994	Jess Settles	
1995	Chris Kingsbury	
1995	Jess Settles	2nd
1995	Andre Woolridge	
1996	Jess Settles	3rd
1996	Andre Woolridge	2nd
1996	Russ Millard	
1997	Andre Woolridge	3rd
1997	Ryan Bowen	
1998	Ryan Bowen	2nd
1999	Dean Oliver	
2000	Dean Oliver	2nd
2001	Reggie Evans	
2001	Dean Oliver	3rd
2002	Reggie Evans	2nd
2002	Luke Recker	
2003	Chauncey Leslie	
2004	Jeff Horner	
2004	Pierre Pierce	
2005	Greg Brunner	
2006	Greg Brunner	2nd
2006	Adam Haluska	
2006	Jeff Horner	2nd
2007	Adam Haluska	2nd
2007	Tyler Smith	
2008	Tony Freeman	
2012	Matt Gatens	
2013	Roy Devyn Marble	
2014	Roy Devyn Marble	2nd

Year	Player	Remarks
2014	Aaron White	
2015	Aaron White	2nd
2015	Jarrod Uthoff	
2016	Jarrod Uthoff	2nd
2016	Peter Jok	
2017	Peter Jok	2nd
2019	Tyler Cook	
2019	Jordan Bohannon	
2020	Luka Garza	
2020	Joe Wieskamp	
2021	Luka Garza	2nd
2021	Joe Wieskamp	2nd
2022	Keegan Murray	
2023	Kris Murray	
2023	Filip Rebrača	
2024	Tony Perkins	
2024	Payton Sandfort	
2026	Bennett Stirtz	

== Team awards ==
=== Most Valuable Players ===
The Iowa Most Valuable Player Award was presented annually to an Iowa player or players from 1946 to 2007:

Year	Player(s)
1946	Herb Wilkinson
1947	Murray Wier
1948	Murray Wier
1949	Charlie Mason
1950	Frank Calsbeek
1951	Frank Calsbeek
1952	Charles Darling
1953	Herb Thompson
1954	Carl Cain
1955	Bill Seaberg
1956	Carl Cain
1957	Dave Gunther
1958	Dave Gunther
1959	Dave Gunther
1960	Don Nelson
1961	Don Nelson
1962	Don Nelson
1963	Jerry Messick
1964	Jimmy Rodgers
1965	Jimmy Rodgers
1966	Dennis Pauling
1967	Gerry Jones
1968	Sam Williams
1969	John Johnson
1970	John Johnson
1971	Fred Brown

Year	Player(s)
1972	Kevin Kunnert; Rick Williams
1973	Kevin Kunnert
1974	Candy LaPrince
1975	Dan Frost
1976	Scott Thompson
1977	Bruce King
1978	Ronnie Lester
1979	Ronnie Lester
1980	Ronnie Lester
1981	Vince Brookins
1982	Kevin Boyle
1983	Bob Hansen
1984	Steve Carfino
1985	Greg Stokes; Michael Payne
1986	Andre Banks
1987	Kevin Gamble; Roy Marble
1988	B. J. Armstrong; Bill Jones; Roy Marble
1989	B. J. Armstrong; Ed Horton; Roy Marble
1990	Les Jepsen
1991	Acie Earl; James Moses

Year	Player(s)
1992	Acie Earl
1993	Acie Earl
1994	James Winters
1995	Jess Settles; Andre Woolridge
1996	Jess Settles; Andre Woolridge; Russ Millard
1997	Andre Woolridge
1998	Ryan Bowen
1999	Jess Settles; Kent McCausland; Dean Oliver
2000	Dean Oliver; Jacob Jaacks
2001	Dean Oliver; Reggie Evans
2002	Reggie Evans; Luke Recker
2003	Chauncey Leslie
2004	Jeff Horner; Pierre Pierce
2005	Jeff Horner; Greg Brunner
2006	Jeff Horner; Greg Brunner; Erek Hansen
2007	Adam Haluska

=== Chris Street Award ===
The Chris Street Award, named in honor of former Hawkeye Chris Street, has been presented annually since 1993 to “a Hawkeye player who best exemplifies the spirit, enthusiasm, and intensity of Chris Street”:

Year	Player(s)
1993	Wade Lookingbill
1994	Jess Settles
1995	Jim Bartels
1996	Jess Settles
1997	Ryan Bowen; John Streif (Trainer)
1998	Darryl Moore
1999	Jason Bauer; Jess Settles
2000	Ryan Luehrsmann; Jason Price
2001	Dean Oliver
2002	Duez Henderson
2003	Jeff Horner
2004	Brody Boyd; Greg Brunner
2005	Adam Haluska
2006	Adam Haluska
2007	Tony Freeman

Year	Player(s)
2008	Cyrus Tate
2009	Jarryd Cole
2010	Devan Bawinkel
2011	Jarryd Cole
2012	Matt Gatens
2013	Eric May
2014	Roy Devyn Marble
2015	Aaron White
2016	Anthony Clemmons; Mike Gesell; Jarrod Uthoff; Adam Woodbury
2017	Peter Jok
2018	Jordan Bohannon
2019	Nicholas Baer
2020	Luka Garza; Ryan Kriener
2021	Luka Garza; Jordan Bohannon

Year	Player(s)
2022	Keegan Murray; Connor McCaffery
2023	Kris Murray; Filip Rebrača
2024	Patrick McCaffery
2025	Payton Sandfort

=== Kenny Arnold Spirit Award ===
Since 2017, the Hawkeyes have awarded the Kenny Arnold Spirit Award at their postseason awards ceremony. Three years after graduating, Arnold was diagnosed with a brain tumor and battled the disease for over 30 years before dying in April 2019. The honor is presented to “a player who exemplifies Arnold’s spirit of leadership, character, courage, determination, and poise.”

Year	Player(s)
2017	
2018	Tyler Cook
2019	Luka Garza
2020	Luka Garza
2021	Joe Wieskamp; Joe Toussaint
2022	Jordan Bohannon; Patrick McCaffery; Austin Ash
2023	Connor McCaffery; Patrick McCaffery
2024	Josh Dix; Ben Krikke
2025	Drew Thelwell

=== Hawkeyes inducted into the Naismith Basketball Hall of Fame ===
Year	Player(s)	Inducted as a:
1979	Sam Barry	Coach
1988	Ralph Miller	Coach
1993	Connie Hawkins*	Player
2002	Lute Olson	Coach
2009	C. Vivian Stringer	Women's Coach
2012	Don Nelson	Coach
2015	George Raveling	Contributor

* Did not play varsity basketball at Iowa

=== Iowa Hawkeye Olympians ===
Year	City	Olympian	Medal
1956 Summer Olympics	Melbourne	Carl Cain	Gold medal
1956 Summer Olympics	Melbourne	Chuck Darling	Gold medal
1984 Summer Olympics	Los Angeles	George Raveling	Gold medal

=== Hawkeyes in the NBA ===
Year	Round	Pick	Player	Selected by	Professional career
FA			Noble Jorgensen	Tri-Cities Blackhawks	1946–1953
FA			Murray Weir	Fort Wayne Zollner Pistons	1947–1951
1959	8	56	Dave Gunther	Philadelphia Warriors	1959–1962
FA			Connie Hawkins*	Pittsburgh Pipers	1961–1976
1962	3	17	Don Nelson*	Chicago Zephyrs	1962–1976
1966	4	35	George Peeples	Indiana Pacers	1966–1973
1968	3	35	Sam Williams	Milwaukee Bucks	1968–1970
1970	1	7	John Johnson	Cleveland Cavaliers	1970–1982
1971	1	6	Fred Brown	Seattle SuperSonics	1971–1984
1973	1	12	Kevin Kunnert	Chicago Bulls	1973–1982
1980	1	10	Ronnie Lester	Portland Trail Blazers	1980–1986
FA			Bill Mayfield	Golden State Warriors	1980–1981
1983	3	54	Bob Hansen	Utah Jazz	1983–1992
1985	2	33	Greg Stokes	Philadelphia 76ers	1985–1990
1987	3	63	Kevin Gamble	Portland Trail Blazers	1987–1998
1987	2	45	Brad Lohaus	Boston Celtics	1987–1998
FA			Bill Jones	New Jersey Nets	1988–1989
1989	1	18	B. J. Armstrong	Chicago Bulls	1989–2000
1989	1	19	Acie Earl	Boston Celtics	1993–1997
1989	1	23	Roy Marble	Atlanta Hawks	1989–1994
1989	2	39	Ed Horton	Washington Bullets	1989–1990
1990	2	28	Les Jepsen	Golden State Warriors	1990–1992
FA			Matt Bullard	Houston Rockets	1990–2002
1998	1	21	Ricky Davis	Charlotte Hornets	1998–2010
1998	2	55	Ryan Bowen	Denver Nuggets	1998–2010
FA			Reggie Evans	Seattle SuperSonics	2002–2015
FA			Dean Oliver	Golden State Warriors	2002–2003
FA			Guy Rucker	Golden State Warriors	2002–2003
FA			Jared Reiner	Chicago Bulls	2005–2007
2014	2	56	Devyn Marble	Denver Nuggets	2014–2016
FA			Jarrod Uthoff	Dallas Mavericks	2016–2020
FA			Tyler Cook	Cleveland Cavaliers	2020–2022
2021	2	41	Joe Wieskamp	San Antonio Spurs	2021–
2021	2	52	Luka Garza	Detroit Pistons	2021–
2022	1	4	Keegan Murray	Sacramento Kings	2022–
2023	1	23	Kris Murray	Portland Trail Blazers	2023–

=== Hawkeyes in international basketball ===
- Devyn Marble (born 1992), basketball player for Maccabi Haifa of the Israeli Basketball Premier League
- Anthony Clemmons (born 1994), basketball player for Vienna (2016-2017), Astana (2017-2019), Monaco (2019-2020), Igokea (2020-2021), Dinamo Sassari (2021), Türk Telecom (2021-2022), San Pablo Burgos (2022), Frutti Extra Bursapor (2022-2023), Sun Rockers Shibuya (2023-2025), and Koshigaya Alphas (2025-present). He is a 2x Kazakhstan League champion (2018, 2019)
- Joe Wieskamp (born 1999), basketball player for South East Melbourne Phoenix (2024-2025) and Science City Jena (2025-present)

== Facilities ==
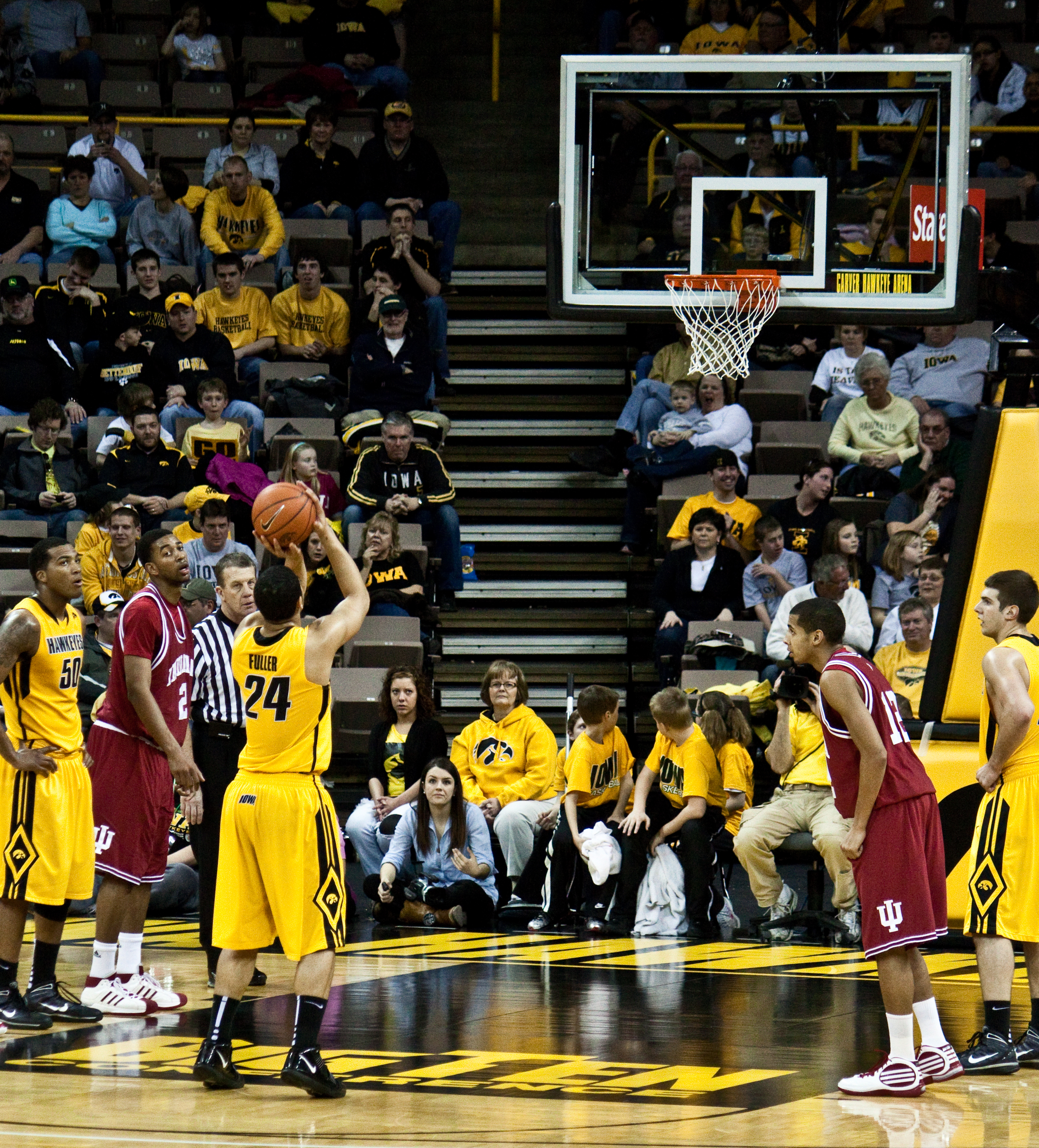
University of Iowa basketball player Aaron Fuller attempts a free throw in a game against Indiana University.

Iowa's men's basketball team plays their home games at Carver–Hawkeye Arena, a 14,998-seat multi-purpose indoor arena located in Iowa City, Iowa. It opened in 1983 and is also the home of the university's wrestling, women's basketball, and volleyball teams.

Prior to playing in Carver-Hawkeye Arena, the Hawkeye men's basketball team played in Close Hall (1902–1905) and then the first Iowa Armory (1905–1922), which was located where the UI Communications Center building currently sits, across the street from the Library on the East Side of the Iowa River. Iowa moved to the second Iowa Armory (1922–1926), and then to the Iowa Field House (1926–1982), which was built directly beside the second Iowa Armory, which was incorporated into the Field House. The Iowa Field House is still used today for classrooms, offices and as home to Iowa gymnastics teams.

=== Arenas ===
First game	Last game	Home arena	Capacity
1901	1905	Close Hall	500
February 24, 1905	1922	First Iowa Armory	2,500
January 8, 1922	1926	Second Iowa Armory	4,500
December 4, 1926	December 11, 1982	Iowa Field House	13,365
January 5, 1983	current	Carver–Hawkeye Arena	15,500
Total	117 seasons	5 venues	Average capacity: 8,997

== University of Iowa Athletics Hall of Fame ==
The following Iowa men's basketball players/coaches have been inducted into the University of Iowa Athletics Hall of Fame. Some were inducted as players in multiple sports where noted:

Players, Inducted:

- BJ Armstrong, 2023
- Fred Brown, 2006
- Carl Cain, 1989
- Chuck Darling, Basketball, Track and Field, 1990
- Aubrey Devine, Football, Basketball, Track and Field, 1989
- Jack Dittmer, Football, Baseball, Basketball, 1993
- Dick Ives, Basketball, Baseball, 2000
- John Johnson, Basketball, 1994
- Nile Kinnick, Football, Basketball, 1989
- Kevin Kunnert, 2024
- Ronnie Lester, 1995
- Bill Logan, 1991
- Don Nelson, 1989
- Erwin Prasse, Football, Basketball, Baseball, 1989
- Bill Seaberg, 2023
- Walter “Stub” Stewart, Football, Basketball, Baseball, 2000 (Note: Stewart also coached Iowa basketball, but was inducted as an athlete.)
- Murray Wier, 1989
- Herb Wilkinson, Basketball, Track and Field, 1999
- Samuel Clyde Williams, Football, Baseball, Track and Field, 1993
- Sam Williams, 2003
- Andre Woolridge, 2017

Coaches:

- Tom Davis, 2008
- Lawrence “Pops” Harrison, 1999
- Ralph Miller, 1995
- Bucky O'Connor, Basketball, Golf, 1990
- Lute Olson, 2000

== See also ==
- University of Iowa Athletics Hall of Fame
- NCAA Men's Division I Final Four appearances by coaches
- Iowa Hawkeyes men's basketball statistical leaders
