= USA Basketball Male Athlete of the Year =

Annual award issued by USA Basketball

The USA Basketball Male Athlete of the Year is an annual award issued by USA Basketball that honors the top American male basketball performer during the year's international competition. Kevin Durant has won the award a record three times (2010, 2016, 2021).

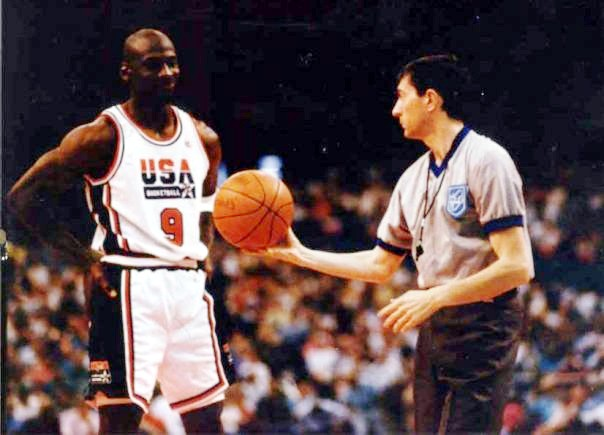
Michael Jordan was the first player to be named to the honor twice (1983 and 1984).

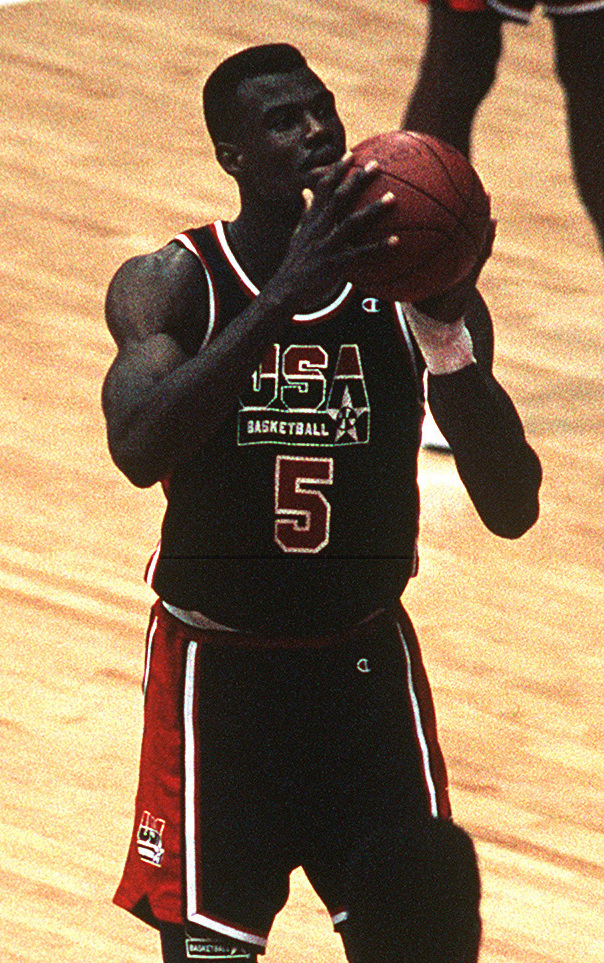
David Robinson was the 1986 recipient.

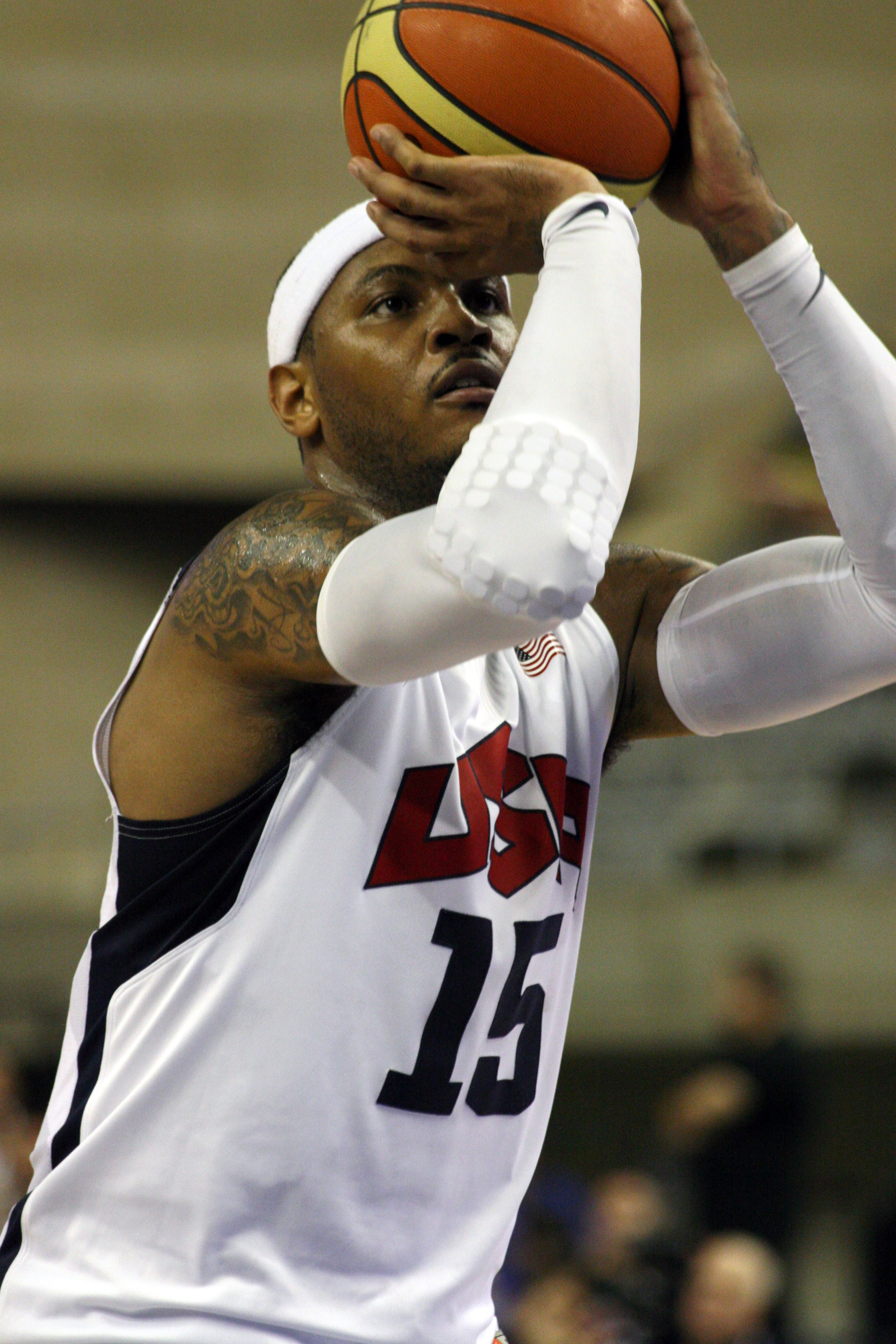
Carmelo Anthony was named twice, in 2006 and 2016.

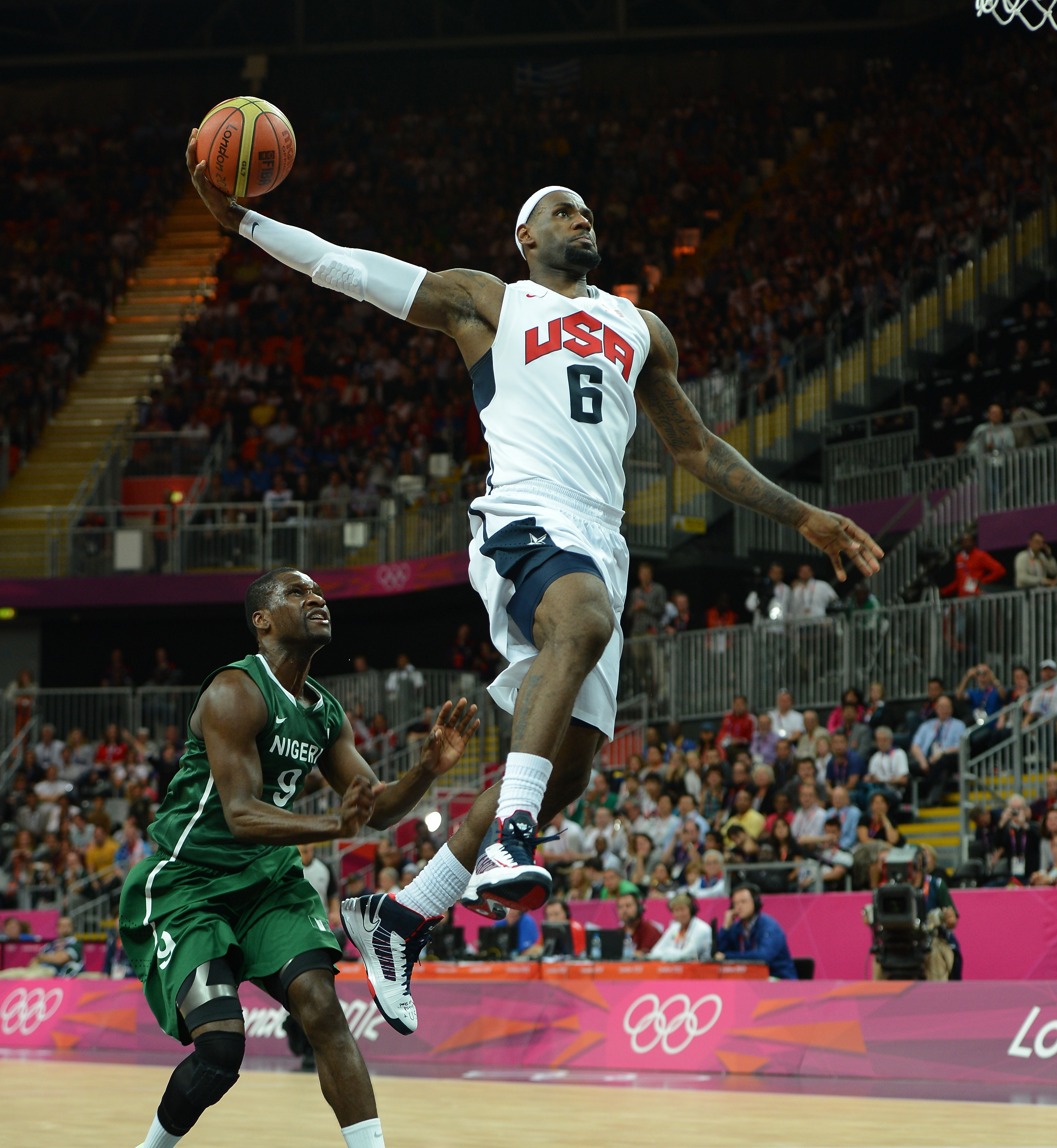
LeBron James was named in 2012.

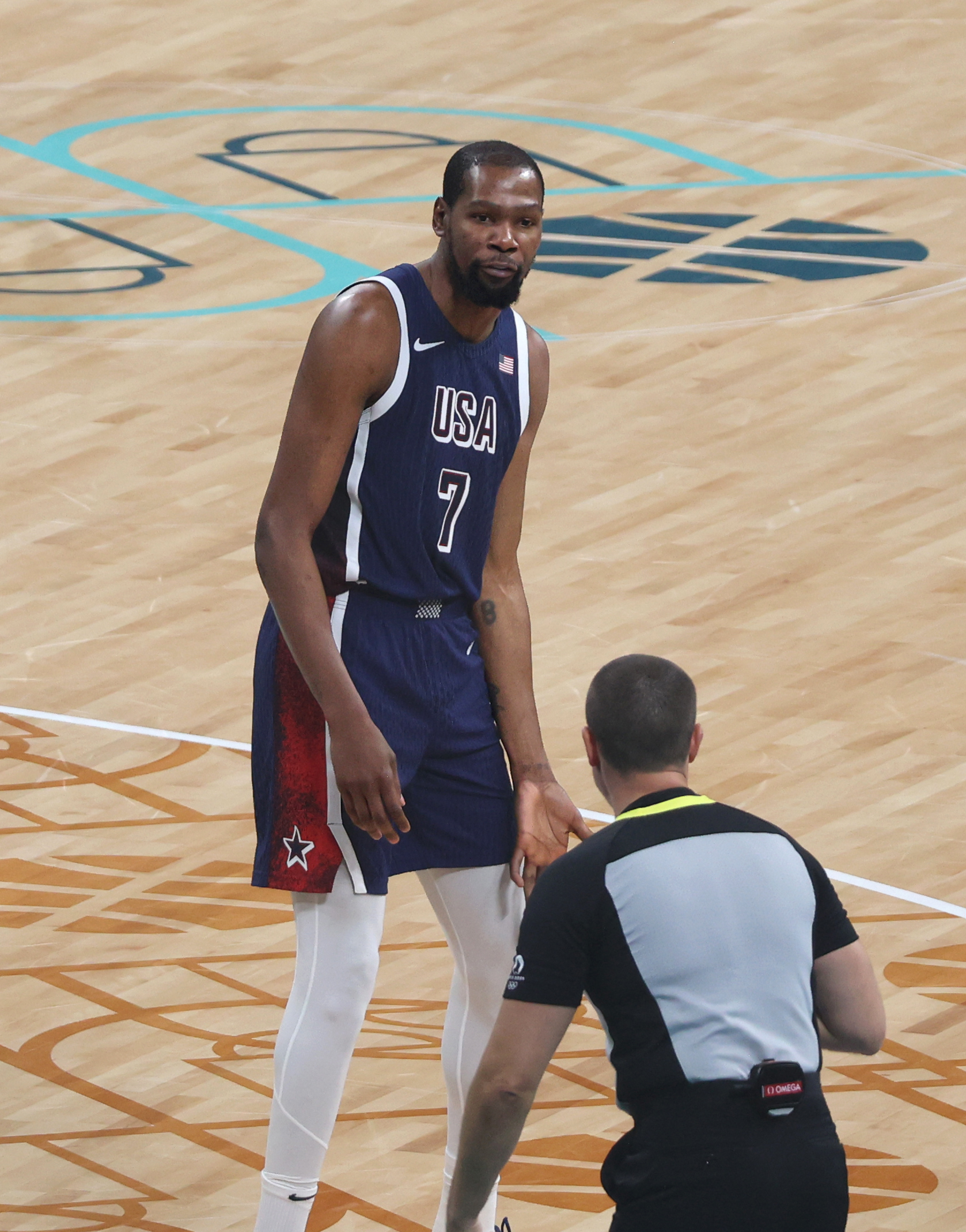
Kevin Durant is the only three-time recipient of the honor (2010, 2016, 2021).

Year	Winner	Ref
1980	Isiah Thomas	
1981	Kevin Boyle	
1982	Doc Rivers	
1983	Michael Jordan	
1984	Michael Jordan (2)	
1984	Sam Perkins	
1985	Chuck Person	
1986	David Robinson	
1987	Danny Manning	
1988	Dan Majerle	
1989	Larry Johnson	
1990	Alonzo Mourning	
1991	Christian Laettner	
1992	1992 Olympic team	
1993	Michael Finley	
1994	Shaquille O'Neal	
1995	Ray Allen	
1996	Scottie Pippen	
1997	Earl Boykins	
1998	Elton Brand	
1999	Gary Payton	
2000	Alonzo Mourning (2)	
2001	Chris Duhon	
2002	Reggie Miller	
2003	Tim Duncan	
2004	Sean May	
2004	Chris Paul	
2005	Shelden Williams	
2006	Carmelo Anthony	
2007	Jason Kidd	
2008	2008 Olympic team	
2009	James Michael McAdoo	
2010	Kevin Durant	
2011	Jabari Parker	
2012	LeBron James	
2013	Aaron Gordon	
2014	Kyrie Irving	
2015	Jalen Brunson	
2016	Carmelo Anthony (2)	
2016	Kevin Durant (2)	
2017	Jameel Warney	
2018	Reggie Hearn	
2019	Robbie Hummel	
2020	No award due to COVID-19 pandemic	
2021	Kevin Durant (3)	
2022	Cooper Flagg	
2023	Koa Peat	
2024	Stephen Curry	
2025	Mikel Brown Jr.	

== See also ==
- USA Basketball Female Athlete of the Year
