= Roy Marble =

American basketball player (1966–2015)

Roy Lane Marble
Personal information
- Born: December 13, 1966 Flint, Michigan, U.S.
- Died: September 11, 2015 (aged 48) Lansing, Michigan, U.S.
- Listed height: 6 ft 6 in (1.98 m)
- Listed weight: 190 lb (86 kg)

Career information
- High school: Beecher (Flint, Michigan)
- College: Iowa (1985–1989)
- NBA draft: 1989: 1st round, 23rd overall pick
- Drafted by: Atlanta Hawks
- Playing career: 1989–1995
- Position: Shooting guard / small forward
- Number: 22, 5

Career history
- 1989–1990: Atlanta Hawks
- 1990–1991: Cedar Rapids Silver Bullets
- 1991–1992: Tri-City Chinook
- 1993: Montreal Dragons
- 1993: Fargo-Moorhead Fever
- 1993: Quad City Thunder
- 1994: Denver Nuggets
- 1994: Tri-City Chinook
- 1994–1995: Shreveport Crawdads

Career highlights
- Big Ten Freshman of the Year (1985); Third-team Parade All-American (1985); McDonald's All-American (1985)
- Stats at NBA.com
- Stats at Basketball Reference

Roy Lane Marble Jr. (December 13, 1966 – September 11, 2015) was an American professional basketball player, 6'6" tall, who played as a swingman.

After playing four seasons at the University of Iowa from 1985 to 1989, Marble left the college as Iowa's all-time leading scorer with 2,116 points, a record which stood for 32 years until Luka Garza broke it on February 21, 2021. Marble was selected by the Atlanta Hawks in the first round (23rd overall) of the 1989 NBA draft, playing for the club during his rookie year (24 games, scoring a total of 51 points).

He also had a brief stint with the Denver Nuggets during the 1993–94 season, appearing in 5 games.

== Personal life ==
In August 2014, Marble was diagnosed with stage 4 cancer that began in his lungs. He was publicly vocal about his struggle with this terminal disease, while relocating his family from Iowa to his home state of Michigan.

Marble died of cancer on September 11, 2015, at the age of 48, the birthday of his nephew, Asher.

Marble's son, Devyn, followed in his father's footsteps to Iowa and the NBA. Devyn and his father were the first father-son duo in Big Ten history to each score 1,000 points.

Marble came into the news again in 2021 when his family expressed displeasure at the retirement of Luka Garza's jersey number (announced after the last game of the season on March 7), noting that they felt hurt and disrespected by the move upon the fact that Marble's number was not retired; Marble, alongside Murray Wier and Chuck Darling, are considered the best players to not have their jersey number retired by Iowa. Devyn stated that he would never publicly watch another Iowa game again. Two days after announcing Garza's jersey retirement, Iowa athletic director Gary Barta gave a public apology to the Marble family.

== Career statistics ==
Legend
GP	Games played	GS	Games started	MPG	Minutes per game
FG%	Field goal percentage	3P%	3-point field goal percentage	FT%	Free throw percentage
RPG	Rebounds per game	APG	Assists per game	SPG	Steals per game
BPG	Blocks per game	PPG	Points per game	**Bold**	Career high

=== NBA ===
==== Regular season ====
Year	Team	GP	GS	MPG	FG%	3P%	FT%	RPG	APG	SPG	BPG	PPG
1989–90	Atlanta	**24**	0	**6.8**	**.276**	.000	**.655**	1.0	**.5**	**.3**	.0	**2.1**
1993–94	Denver	5	0	6.4	.167	–	.000	**1.6**	.2	.0	**.4**	.8
Career		29	0	6.7	.257	.000	.594	1.1	.4	.2	.1	1.9
