= Bill Logan (basketball) =

American basketball player (1934–2018)

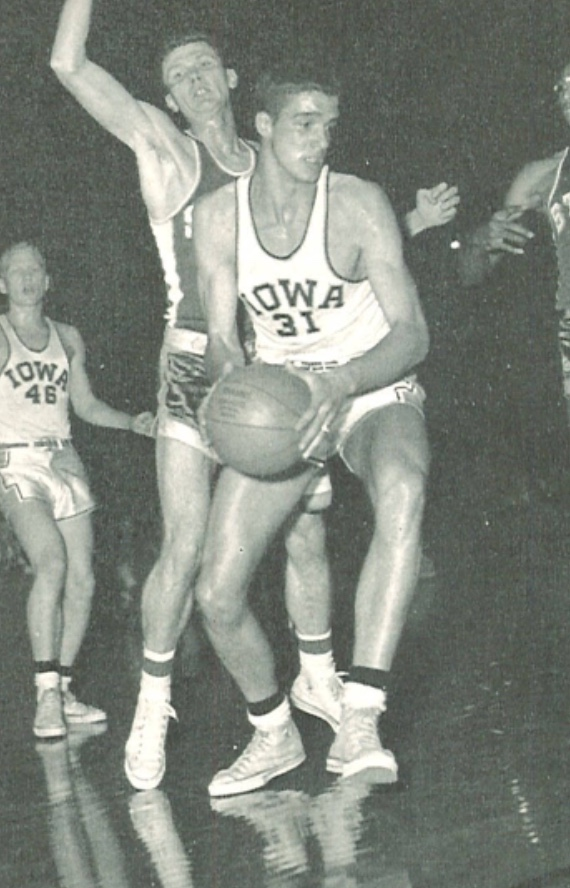
- Logan from the 1954 Hawkeye

Personal information
- Born: December 30, 1934 Keokuk, Iowa
- Died: January 25, 2018 (aged 83) Keokuk, Iowa
- Listed height: 6 ft 7 in (2.01 m)

Career information
- High school: Keokuk (Keokuk, Iowa)
- College: Iowa (1953–1956)
- NBA draft: 1956: 5th round
- Drafted by: Boston Celtics
- Position: Center

Career history
- 1956–1957: Denver-Chicago Truckers

Career highlights
- 2× First-team All-Big Ten (1955, 1956); No. 31 retired by Iowa Hawkeyes
- Stats at Basketball Reference

William Logan (December 30, 1934 – January 25, 2018) was an American basketball player. He is best known for his college career at the University of Iowa.

Logan came to the Iowa Hawkeyes from Keokuk High School in Keokuk, Iowa, where he was an All-State player. As a Hawkeye, Logan was a part of what would become one of the school's top recruiting classes, the “Fabulous Five” (along with classmates Carl Cain, Sharm Scheuerman, Bill Seaberg and Bill Schoof). The group started for three seasons, taking the school to its first two Final Fours in 1955 and 1956.

Logan was named first-team All-Big Ten Conference as a junior and senior, And in his senior season set an Iowa career scoring mark with 1,188 points (since eclipsed).

Following his college career, Logan was drafted by the Boston Celtics of the National Basketball Association. He chose to enter business, playing one season for the Denver-Chicago Truckers in the Amateur Athletic Union before returning to the state of Iowa to enter banking. He died on January 25, 2018, at the age of 83.
