= Iowa Mr. Basketball =

Honor awarded to high school basketball players

Each year, the Iowa Mr. Basketball award is given to the male athlete chosen as the best high school boys basketball player in the U.S. state of Iowa in the United States.

Awarded since 1981, winners were chosen by the Iowa Newspaper Association at the time that annual all-state selections are made until 2017. Starting with the 2018 season, the honor was awarded by the newly formed Iowa Print Sports Writers Association, who took over all-state selections for the newspaper industry starting with the 2018 high school basketball seasons. Most of the award winners have gone on to play at the highest levels of college basketball, and some have continued play in the National Basketball Association.

Voting is done on a points system. Each voter selects first, second, and third-place votes. A player receives five points for each first-place vote, three points for each second-place vote, and one point for a third-place vote. The player receiving the most points receives the award.

== Award winners ==
Year	Player	High School	College	Notes
1981	Todd Berkenpas	Maple Valley	Iowa	
1982 (tie)	Ted Burbach	Dubuque Wahlert	Iowa State / Western Illinois	
1982 (tie)	Randy Kraayenbrink	Paullina	Northern Iowa	
1983	Todd Lumsden	Linn-Mar	Northern Iowa	
1984	Al Lorenzen	Kennedy	Iowa	
1985	Brian David	Kuemper Catholic	Arizona	
1986	Chris Gaines	Waterloo West	Hawaiʻi	
1987	Robert Johnson	Lincoln	Iowa State	
1988	Wade Lookingbill	Fort Dodge	Iowa	
1989	Mike Bergman	Waverly-Shell Rock	Iowa State	
1990	Mike Davis	Waterloo East	Southwest Missouri State / Southeastern CC	
1991	Fred Hoiberg	Ames	Iowa State	Played 10 years in the NBA and is former head coach of the Chicago Bulls and the Iowa State University men's basketball team. He is currently head coach of the Nebraska Cornhuskers men's basketball team.
1992	Eric Pothoven	Pella Christian	Liberty	
1993	Jess Settles	Winfield-Mt. Union	Iowa	
1994	Raef LaFrentz	MFL Mar-Mac, Monona	Kansas	Played 11 seasons (1998–2009) in the NBA for the Denver Nuggets, Dallas Mavericks, Boston Celtics, and Portland Trail Blazers.
1995	Adam Spanich	Regis	USC / MCC / Oral Roberts	
1996	Justin Wessel	Prairie	Arizona	1997 NCAA Champion
1997	Dean Oliver	Mason City	Iowa	Played in the NBA for the Golden State Warriors from 2001 to 2003. Oliver is currently an assistant men's basketball coach at Wisconsin.
1998	David Newman	Hoover	Drake / Northwestern	
1999 (tie)	Nick Collison	Iowa Falls	Kansas	Played in the NBA for the Seattle SuperSonics/Oklahoma City Thunder and is now currently retired.
1999 (tie)	Kirk Hinrich	Sioux City West	Kansas	Played in the NBA for the Chicago Bulls, Atlanta Hawks, and Washington Wizards
2000	Glen Worley	Iowa City West	Iowa	Currently Assistant Coach at Academy of Art University
2001	Tyler McKinney	Urbandale	Creighton	
2002	Jeff Horner	Mason City	Iowa	Currently Head Coach at Buena Vista University
2003	Brooks McKowen	Wapsie Valley	Northern Iowa	Current Head Coach at Upper Iowa University
2004	Carlton Reed	Waterloo East	Northern Iowa/Iowa	
2005	Josh Van Es	MOC-Floyd Valley	Northwestern College	
2006	Jason Bohannon	Linn-Mar	Wisconsin	
2007	Clayton Vette	Waverly-Shell Rock	Iowa State/Winona State	undrafted in the NBA, has played for various European teams
2008	Matt Gatens	Iowa City	Iowa	
2009	Brennan Cougill	Bishop Heelan	Iowa/ Green Bay	
2010	Harrison Barnes	Ames	North Carolina	Named the "Player of the Year" in the USA Today 2010 All-USA high school boys basketball team. 2015 NBA Finals Champion. Currently plays in the NBA for the San Antonio Spurs.
2011	Jarrod Uthoff	Cedar Rapids Jefferson	Wisconsin / Iowa	
2012	Marcus Paige	Linn-Mar	North Carolina	
2013	Peter Jok	West Des Moines Valley	Iowa	
2014	Wyatt Lohaus	Iowa City West	Northern Iowa	
2015	Daniel Tillo	Sioux City North	Kentucky / Iowa Western	Pursued baseball instead of basketball. Played in the Kansas City Royals and San Francisco Giants organizations from 2018–2023.
2016	Jordan Bohannon	Linn-Mar	Iowa	
2017	Joe Smoldt	Gladbrook-Reinbeck	Upper Iowa	
2018	Joe Wieskamp	Muscatine	Iowa	Drafted 41st overall by the San Antonio Spurs in the 2021 NBA draft.
2019 (tie)	D. J. Carton	Bettendorf	Ohio State/Marquette	
2019 (tie)	Jake Hilmer	North Linn	Upper Iowa	Pursued basketball and baseball at Upper Iowa.
2020	Bowen Born	Norwalk	Northern Iowa	
2021	Tucker DeVries	Waukee	Drake / West Virginia / Indiana	Played for his father, Darian, in college.
2022	Tamin Lipsey	Ames	Iowa State	
2023	Pryce Sandfort	Waukee Northwest	Iowa / Nebraska	Played two seasons with brother Payton at Iowa; transferred to Nebraska to play for 1991 Iowa Mr. Basketball, Fred Hoiberg
2024	Jesse Van Kalsbeek	MOC-Floyd Valley	Northwestern College (Iowa) / South Dakota State	
2025	Trevin Jirak	Valley High School	Iowa	
2026	Jaidyn Coon	Storm Lake	Iowa	
