= Pat Angerer =

American football player (born 1987)

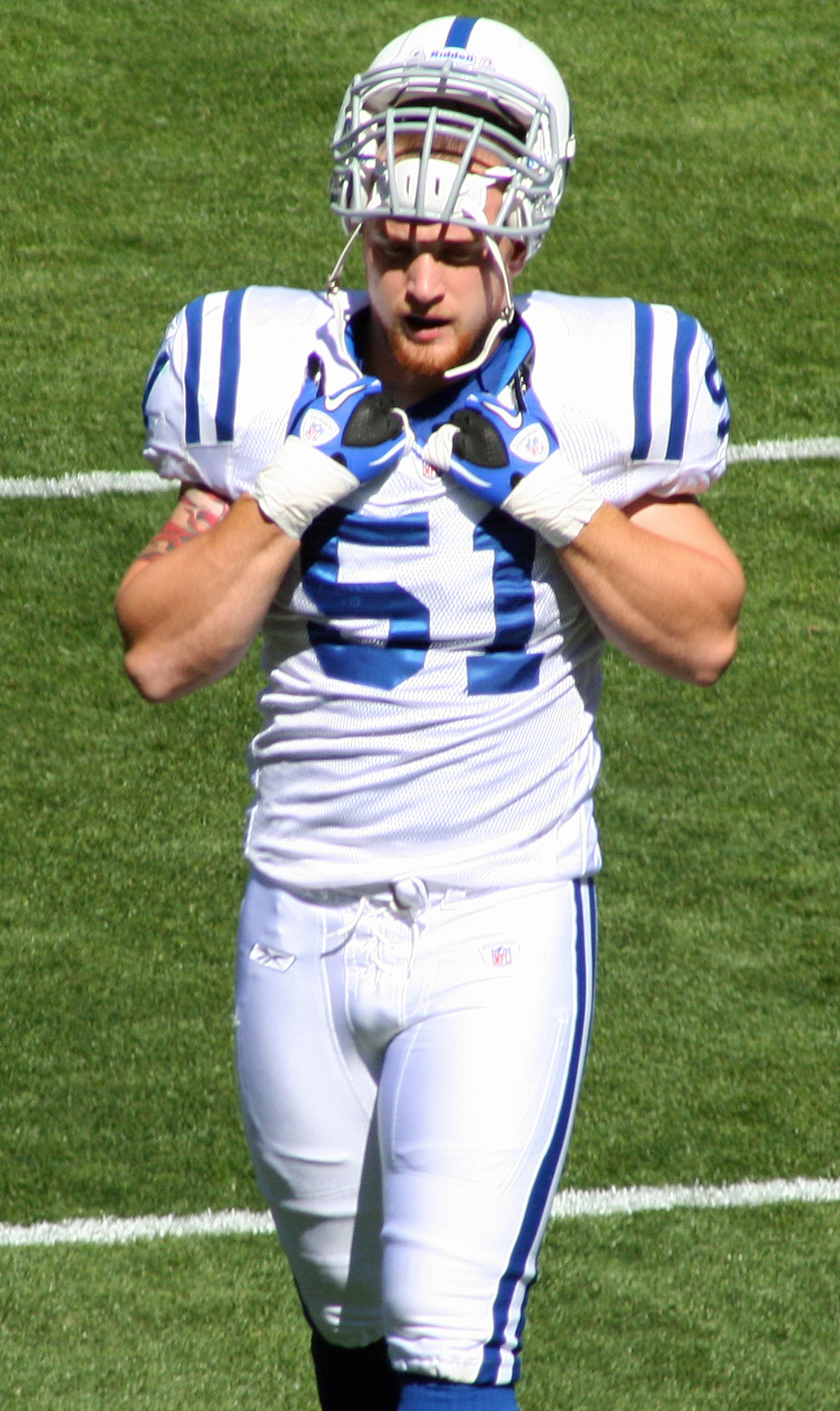
- Angerer with the Indianapolis Colts in 2010

No. 51
- Position: Linebacker

Personal information
- Born: January 31, 1987 (age 39); Bettendorf, Iowa, U.S.
- Listed height: 6 ft 0 in (1.83 m)
- Listed weight: 236 lb (107 kg)

Career information
- High school: Bettendorf
- College: Iowa (2005–2009)
- NFL draft: 2010: 2nd round, 63rd overall pick

Career history
- Indianapolis Colts (2010–2013); Atlanta Falcons (2014)*
- * Offseason or practice squad member only

Awards and highlights
- PFWA All-Rookie Team (2010); Sporting News 2010 All Rookie Team; First-team All-American (2009); First-team All-Big Ten (2009); Second-team All-Big Ten (2008)

Career NFL statistics
- Total tackles: 327
- Sacks: 2.5
- Forced fumbles: 4
- Fumble recoveries: 1
- Interceptions: 2
- Stats at Pro Football Reference

Patrick Aaron Angerer (born January 31, 1987) is an American former professional football player who was a linebacker in the National Football League (NFL). He played college football for the Iowa Hawkeyes and was selected by the Indianapolis Colts in the second round of the 2010 NFL draft.

== Early life ==
Angerer attended Bettendorf High School in Bettendorf, Iowa, where he recorded career totals of 344 tackles, including 63 tackles for loss, 17 quarterback sacks, five forced fumbles, four recovered fumbles and one interception while playing middle linebacker. A team captain as a senior, he holds school records for tackles in a game (25), season (197) and career (344). Angerer earned first team all-state honors as a senior and junior.

Considered a three-star recruit by Rivals.com, Angerer was listed as the No. 26 inside linebacker prospect in the nation. He chose the University of Iowa over Iowa State, Indiana and Northern Illinois.

== College career ==
After redshirting his initial year at Iowa, Angerer saw limited action as third team weak side linebacker in his freshman season, and second team weak side linebacker in his injury-filled sophomore season.

Working through mononucleosis, as well as hamstring, groin and shoulder injuries, Angerer finally made the starting lineup in 2008. Occupying the middle linebacker spot, he led the Hawkeyes in tackles with 107 stops, including 45 solo tackles and 62 assists, and also had five interceptions. Angerer subsequently earned Second-team All-Big Ten honors in 2008.

For the 2009 season, Angerer was named to Butkus Award, Lombardi Award, and Bednarik Award watch lists. By November 2009, Angerer was named one of sixteen semifinalists for the Bednarik Award.

Angerer was one of five finalists for Bronko Nagurski Award

== Professional career ==
=== Indianapolis Colts ===
In the 2010 NFL draft, Angerer was selected 63rd overall in the second round by the Indianapolis Colts with the 63rd overall pick.

Angerer finished the 2010 preseason with 36 tackles and 2 sacks. He started the season backing up Gary Brackett at middle linebacker. Angerer made his first career start during Week 6 against the Washington Redskins in place of an injured Brackett. Angerer had an impressive game with 11 tackles, a sack and 2 passes defended.

In 2011, Angerer was the starting middle linebacker for all 16 regular season games and he led the Colts in tackles with 148.

=== Atlanta Falcons ===
On July 22, 2014, Angerer signed a one-year contract with the Atlanta Falcons. He was subsequently released by the Falcons for final roster cuts before the start of the 2014 season.

On October 14, 2014, Angerer announced his retirement.

=== NFL statistics ===
Year	Team	GP	COMB	TOTAL	AST	SACK	FF	FR	FR YDS	INT	IR YDS	AVG IR	LNG	TD	PD
2010	IND	16	88	58	30	1.0	1	0	0	0	0	0	0	0	2
2011	IND	16	148	78	70	1.0	2	1	10	1	0	0	0	0	3
2012	IND	11	28	21	7	0.0	1	0	0	0	0	0	0	0	1
2013	IND	11	63	37	26	0.5	0	0	0	1	4	4	4	0	2
Career		54	327	194	133	2.5	4	1	0	2	4	2	4	0	8

== Personal life ==
Angerer is the son of Mary and Cliff Angerer. He has three older brothers and one older sister. In middle school he was a star baseball player for the Bettendorf Diamondkings. Angerer proposed to his high school sweetheart, Mary Beth Porter, after the Orange Bowl victory. They were married on July 10, 2010, in Bettendorf, IA.

Pat, Tavian Banks, and Darien Porter are currently the only former Bettendorf Bulldogs to be drafted into the NFL.
