= Jordan Bohannon =

American basketball player (born 1997)

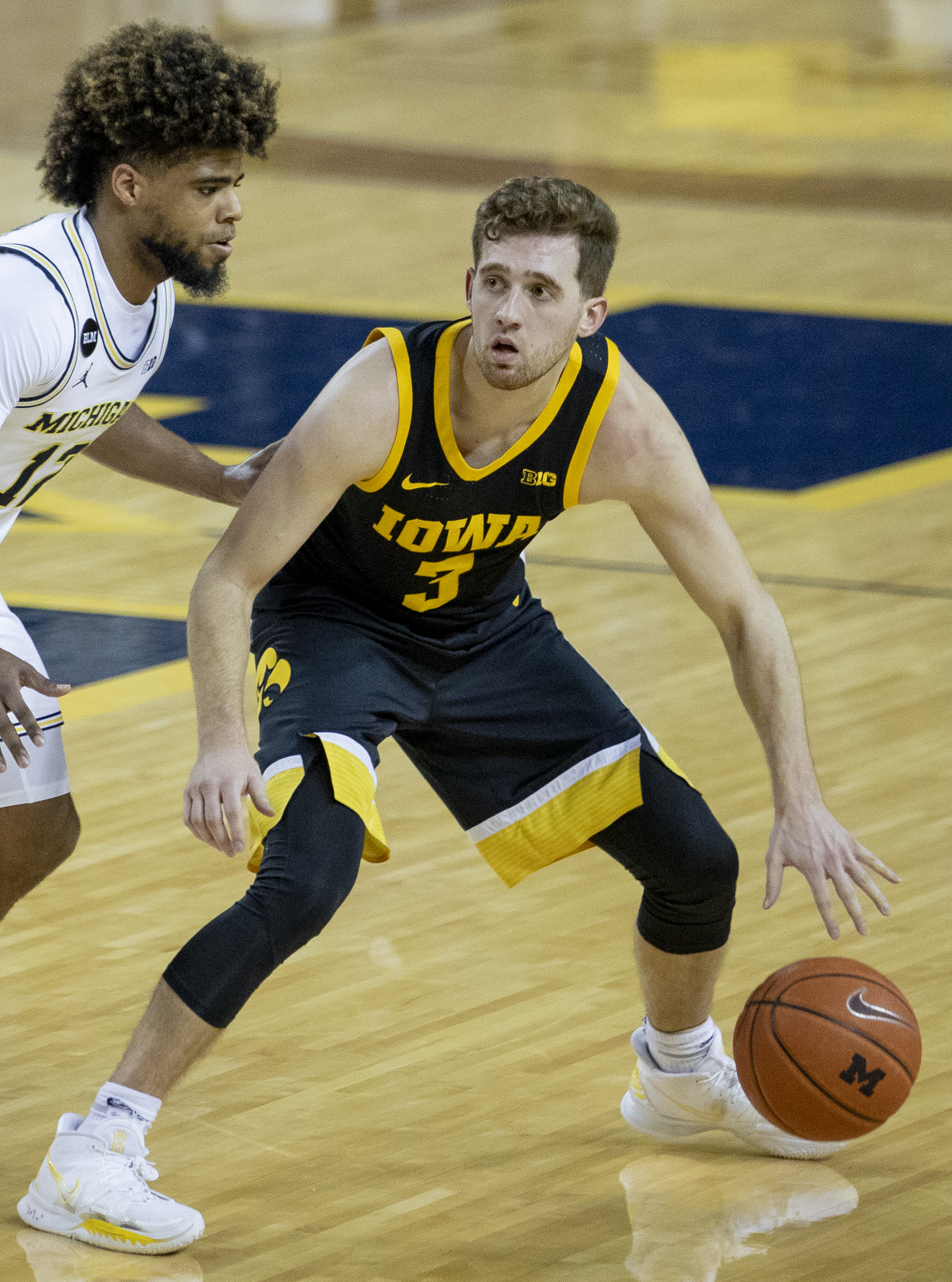
- Bohannon with Iowa in 2021

Personal information
- Born: June 19, 1997 (age 29) Marion, Iowa, U.S.
- Listed height: 6 ft 1 in (1.85 m)
- Listed weight: 175 lb (79 kg)

Career information
- High school: Linn-Mar (Marion, Iowa)
- College: Iowa (2016–2022)
- NBA draft: 2022: undrafted
- Playing career: 2022–2023
- Position: Point guard

Career history
- 2022–2023: Iowa Wolves

Career highlights
- Third-team All-Big Ten – Coaches (2019); Big Ten All-Freshman Team (2017); Iowa Mr. Basketball (2016)

Jordan Lee Bohannon (born June 19, 1997) is an American former professional basketball player He played college basketball for the Iowa Hawkeyes. Bohannon is currently the all-time leader in career games played in NCAA Division I men's basketball with 179.

== High school career ==
Bohannon was a four-year varsity basketball starter and captain for Linn-Mar High School in Marion, Iowa. He averaged 17.8 points, 4.6 rebounds and 4.2 assists per game as a junior and led Class 4A with 77 three-pointers. As a senior, he averaged 25.8 points and 5.3 rebounds per game, leading his team to a 17–6 record and the Class 4A sub-state final. He led Class 4A with 593 points in the season, ranking third in the state, and scored 44 points in his final game, a loss to Cedar Falls High School. Bohannon was named Iowa Mr. Basketball and Iowa Gatorade Player of the Year. He left as Linn-Mar's all-time leader in three-pointers and free throws. Bohannon played Amateur Athletic Union (AAU) basketball for Martin Brothers alongside future Iowa teammates Ryan Kriener and Cordell Pemsl. Bohannon also played golf for four years in high school.

=== Recruiting ===
Bohannon did not have any NCAA Division I offers until playing on the AAU circuit after his junior season. On August 28, 2015, before his senior year, he committed to playing college basketball for Iowa. By the end of his high school career, Bohannon was considered a four-star recruit and the top player in Iowa by ESPN.

College recruiting
Name	Hometown	School	Height	Weight	Commit date
Jordan Bohannon; PG	Marion, IA	Linn-Mar (IA)	6 ft 0 in (1.83 m)	170 lb (77 kg)	Aug 28, 2015
Jordan Bohannon; PG	Recruit ratings: Rivals: 247Sports: ESPN: (80)				
Overall recruit ranking: Rivals: — 247Sports: — ESPN: —
Note: In many cases, Scout, Rivals, 247Sports, On3, and ESPN may conflict in their listings of height and weight.; In these cases, the average was taken. ESPN grades are on a 100-point scale.; Sources: "Iowa 2016 Basketball Commitments". Rivals.; "2016 Iowa Hawkeyes Recruiting Class". ESPN.; "2016 Team Ranking". Rivals.

== College career ==
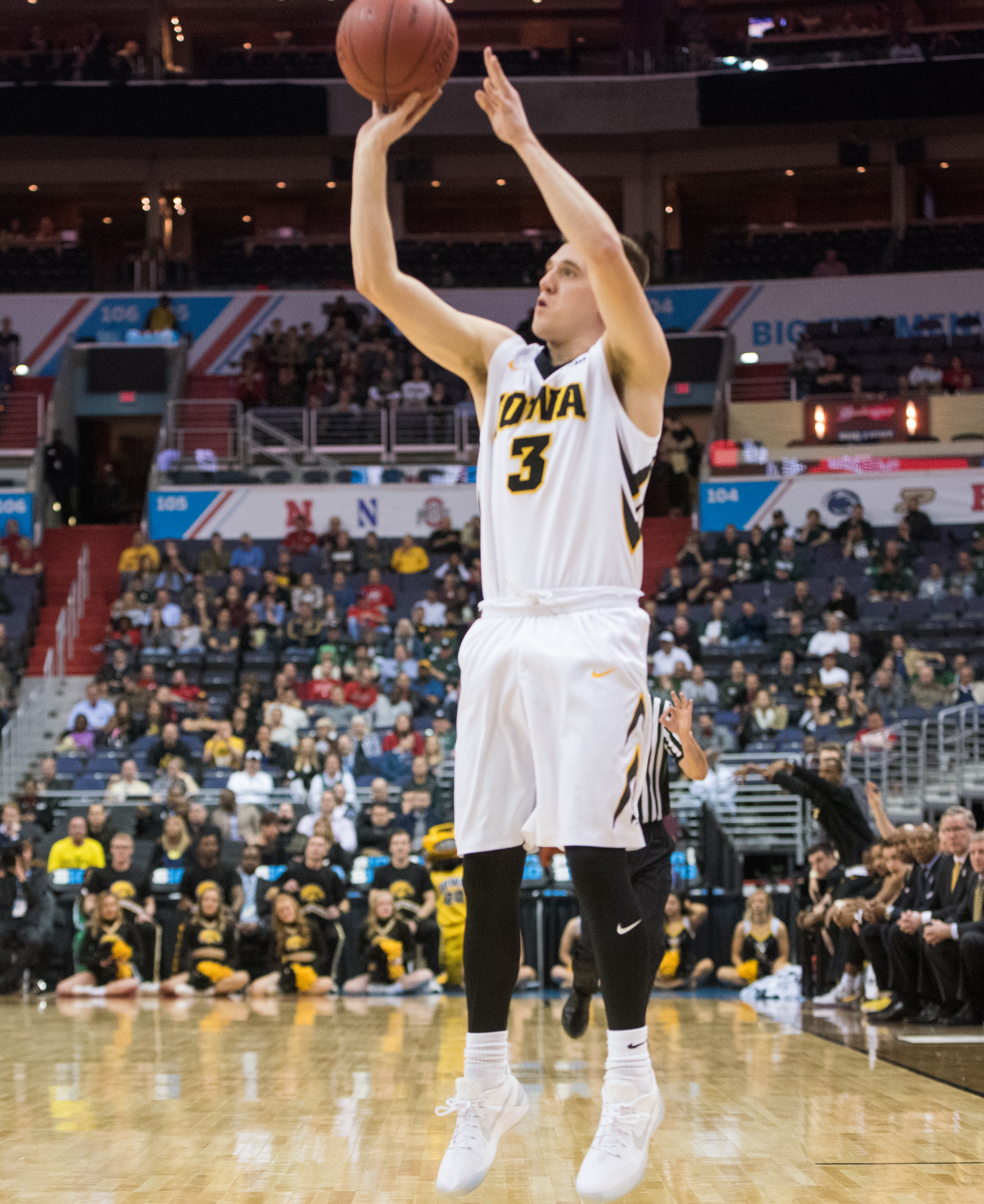
Bohannon in 2017

On February 6, 2017, Bohannon was named Big Ten Conference Freshman of the Week after averaging 16 points, three assists and 2.5 rebounds per game, shooting 69 percent from three-point range, in wins over Rutgers and Nebraska. On March 2, he recorded 11 points and five assists and made a game-winning three-pointer with 9.7 seconds remaining in a 59–57 victory over 21st-ranked Wisconsin. Four days later, he was named Big Ten Freshman of the Week for a second time. Bohannon registered double-doubles in each of his final three games of the season. In the second round of the 2017 Big Ten tournament, Bohannon posted 24 points and 10 assists in a 95–73 loss to Indiana. In his season finale at the second round of the 2017 National Invitation Tournament, he recorded season-highs of 25 points and 13 assists in a 94–92 overtime loss to TCU. As a freshman, Bohannon averaged 10.9 points, 5.2 assists and 2.2 rebounds per game, earning Big Ten All-Freshman Team honors. He set Iowa freshman single-season records in three-pointers and assists.

For much of his sophomore season, Bohannon played through plantar fasciitis in his right foot. On November 22, 2017, he scored a sophomore season-high 30 points, shooting 6-of-8 from three-point range, in a 95–85 win over UAB. He averaged 13.5 points, 5.4 assists and 2.2 rebounds, shooting 43 percent on three pointers, and was an honorable mention All-Big Ten selection by the media. A notable moment occurred on February 25, 2018, where after tying the school's record of 34 straight free throws made, he intentionally missed the 35th so as not to break the record of Chris Street, an Iowa alumnus who died in a car accident during his record streak. After the game he spoke with reporters and said, "That's not my record to have. That record deserves to stay in his name."

On February 7, 2019, as a junior, he scored a season-high 25 points, including his team's final 11 points, in a 77–72 victory over Indiana. Three days later, Bohannon scored 11 points and made a game-winning three-pointer in an 80–79 win over Northwestern. On February 22, he scored 17 points and made three three-pointers in overtime to help defeat Indiana. In his junior season, Bohannon averaged 11.6 points, 3.4 assists and 2.4 rebounds per game, surpassing Jeff Horner as Iowa's all-time leader in three-pointers. He was selected to the third team All-Big Ten by the coaches and was named honorable mention All-Big Ten by the media. In May 2019, Bohannon underwent surgery on his right hip, which had been causing him pain since the beginning of his junior season. On December 16, after playing 10 games as a senior, he announced that he would undergo season-ending surgery for a left hip injury, which he first noticed about one month after his previous surgery, and would seek a medical redshirt to play another season.

After leading Iowa in assists and three-pointers in 2020–21, and also averaging 10.6 points per game, he announced that he would return for a rare sixth season of eligibility in 2021–22. Because of disruptions to college sports caused by COVID-19, the NCAA ruled that the 2020–21 season would not be counted against the eligibility of any student-athlete in an NCAA winter sport, including basketball.

During the early hours of May 23, 2021, Bohannon was assaulted in a bar by another patron not far from the Iowa campus in Iowa City, suffering what was described as a serious head injury. He was expected to recover in time for the 2021–22 season, and returned for the start of the Hawkeyes' season.

On November 18, 2021, Bohannon set the Big Ten record for career three-point field goals when he hit his 375th in a game against Alabama State. Bohannon passed Ohio State's Jon Diebler. On March 12, 2022, he scored 12 points and hit the game-winning three-pointer in an 80–77 win against Indiana in the Big Ten tournament. Bohannon was named Honorable Mention All-Big Ten.

== Professional career ==
=== Iowa Wolves (2022–2023) ===
Bohannon went undrafted in the 2022 NBA draft. On November 2, 2022, Bohannon was named to the opening night roster for the Iowa Wolves.

== Career statistics ==
Legend
GP	Games played	GS	Games started	MPG	Minutes per game
FG%	Field goal percentage	3P%	3-point field goal percentage	FT%	Free throw percentage
RPG	Rebounds per game	APG	Assists per game	SPG	Steals per game
BPG	Blocks per game	PPG	Points per game	**Bold**	Career high

=== College ===
Year	Team	GP	GS	MPG	FG%	3P%	FT%	RPG	APG	SPG	BPG	PPG
2016–17	Iowa	34	28	29.6	.388	.416	.855	2.2	5.1	**.9**	**.1**	10.9
2017–18	Iowa	33	33	**31.8**	**.423**	**.430**	.904	2.2	**5.4**	.7	.0	**13.5**
2018–19	Iowa	35	35	31.0	.381	.383	.872	2.4	3.4	.7	.0	11.6
2019–20	Iowa	10	6	25.0	.298	.328	**1.000**	1.6	3.3	.8	.0	8.8
2020–21	Iowa	31	31	29.2	.389	.390	.889	**3.1**	4.4	.5	.0	10.6
2021–22	Iowa	**36**	**36**	26.9	.385	.382	.889	1.3	1.8	.8	.0	11.0
Career		179	169	29.4	.389	.397	.887	2.2	3.9	.7	.0	11.4

== Personal life ==
Bohannon's father, Gordy, played quarterback for Iowa. Bohannon has three older brothers, Jason, Matt and Zach. Jason earned Iowa Mr. Basketball honors at Linn-Mar High School and played for Wisconsin before a brief professional career in the United States and Germany. Matt played for Northern Iowa, and Zach played for Air Force and Wisconsin. Bohannon briefly hosted a college basketball podcast for Barstool Sports along with Hunter Dickinson, Barstool Sports personalities Jeff Nadu, and Matt Cahill

== See also ==
- List of NCAA Division I men's basketball career games played leaders
- List of NCAA Division I men's basketball career 3-point scoring leaders
