= D. J. Carton =

American basketball player (born 2000)

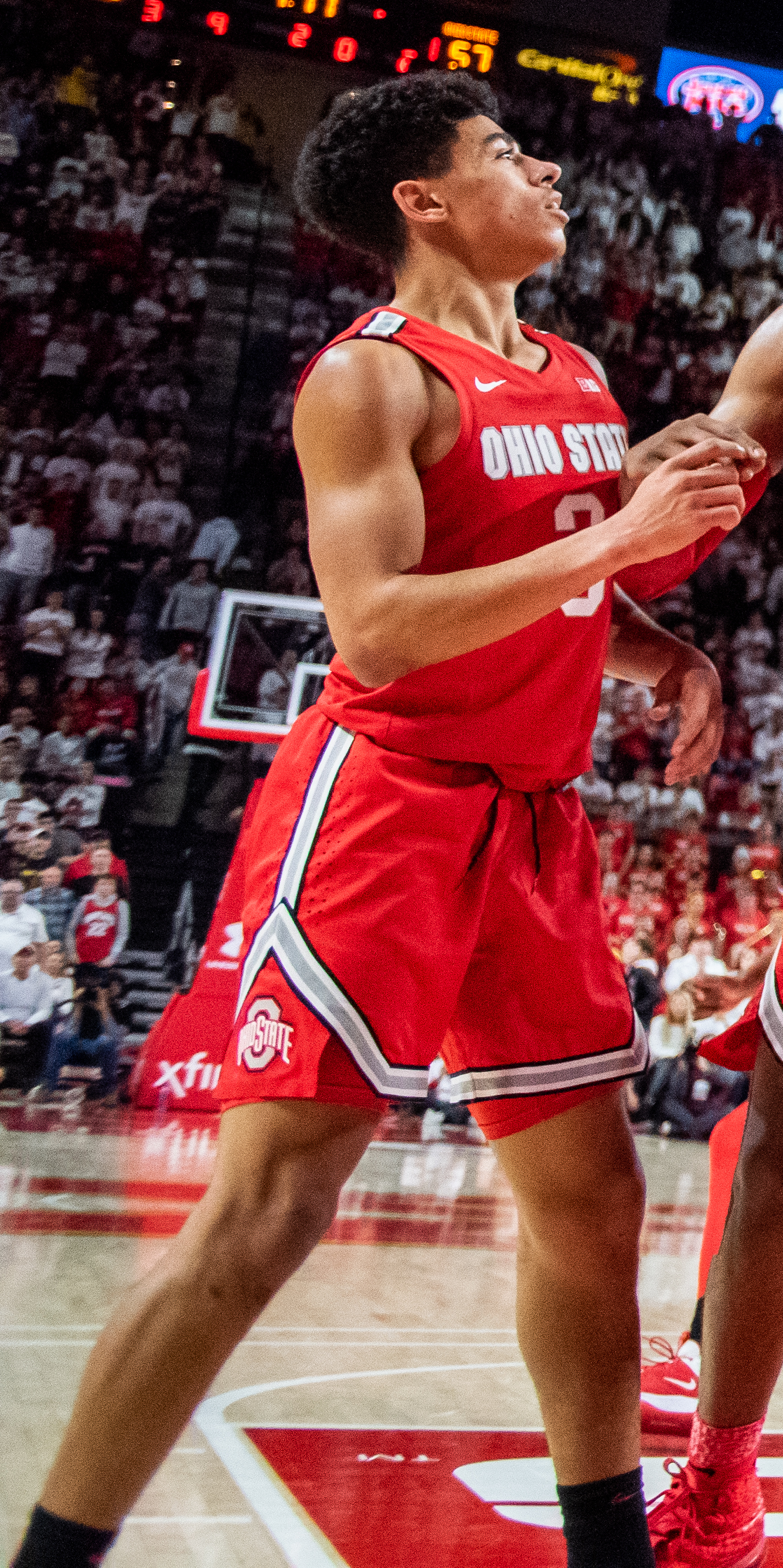
- Carton with Ohio State in 2020

No. 3 – Laketown Squadron
- Position: Point guard
- League: NBA G League

Personal information
- Born: August 5, 2000 (age 26) Pineville, North Carolina, U.S.
- Listed height: 6 ft 3 in (1.91 m)
- Listed weight: 200 lb (91 kg)

Career information
- High school: Bettendorf (Bettendorf, Iowa)
- College: Ohio State (2019–2020); Marquette (2020–2021)
- NBA draft: 2021: undrafted
- Playing career: 2021–present

Career history
- 2021–2022: Greensboro Swarm
- 2022–2024: Iowa Wolves
- 2024: Toronto Raptors
- 2024: →Raptors 905
- 2025: San Diego Clippers
- 2025–present: Birmingham/Laketown Squadron

Career highlights
- Co-Iowa Mr. Basketball (2019)
- Stats at NBA.com
- Stats at Basketball Reference

Desi Justice Carton (born August 5, 2000) is an American professional basketball player for the Laketown Squadron of the NBA G League. He played college basketball for the Ohio State Buckeyes and the Marquette Golden Eagles.

== Early life ==
Growing up, Carton's family moved several times before settling in Geneseo, Illinois. While living in Geneseo he attended St. Malachy Catholic School, and also went to the Geneseo Middle School. He excelled at baseball and could throw 75 miles an hour by seventh grade. He also played running back on the football team, but a rotator cuff injury forced him to concentrate on basketball. Carton moved to Bettendorf, Iowa after eighth grade and he attended Bettendorf High School, where he became a starter on the basketball team as a sophomore. As a junior, he was a first-team all-state pick, averaging a school-record 26.3 points per game to go with 5.7 rebounds and 3.3 assists per game. He scored 49 points against Davenport West High School during his senior season. Carton led the Bulldogs to a 21–2 season and the top of the Class 4A state rankings before they fell to Dubuque Senior High School in the state Sweet 16 despite 27 points from Carton. As a senior, Carton averaged 24.4 points, 7.6 rebounds and 6.0 assists per game. Carton finished his career as the all-time leading scorer with 1,198 points and was among the school's all-time leaders in rebounds (372) and assists (257). He was named Co-Iowa Mr. Basketball in 2019, alongside Jake Hilmer. In AAU play, Carton competed for the Iowa Barnstormers before joining the Quad City Elite.

Ranked the 34th best player in his class and a four-star recruit, Carton committed to Ohio State on July 14, 2018, over offers from Indiana, Michigan, Iowa, Marquette and Xavier, among others.

College recruiting
Name	Hometown	School	Height	Weight	Commit date
D. J. Carton; PG	Bettendorf, IA	Bettendorf (IA)	6 ft 1 in (1.85 m)	180 lb (82 kg)	Jul 14, 2018
D. J. Carton; PG	Recruit ratings: Rivals: 247Sports: ESPN: (89)				
Overall recruit ranking: Rivals: 33 247Sports: 32 ESPN: 35
Note: In many cases, Scout, Rivals, 247Sports, On3, and ESPN may conflict in their listings of height and weight.; In these cases, the average was taken. ESPN grades are on a 100-point scale.; Sources: "Ohio State 2019 Basketball Commitments". Rivals.; "2019 Ohio State Buckeyes Recruiting Class". ESPN.; "2019 Team Ranking". Rivals.

== College career ==
Carton was named the Big Ten preseason freshman of the year, but Florida State transfer CJ Walker started ahead of him at point guard to begin the season. Carton scored a season-high 19 points on December 15, 2019, in a 84–71 loss to Minnesota. On January 26, 2020, Carton scored 17 points and had three assists in a win over Northwestern. He decided to take a leave of absence from the team on January 30, citing mental health issues. Carton averaged 10.4 points and 3.0 assists per game as a freshman, shooting 40% from 3-point range. Following the season, he opted to transfer from Ohio State.

On April 15, 2020, Carton committed to continue his career at Marquette. He was granted immediate eligibility by the NCAA. Carton averaged 13 points, 4.1 rebounds and 3.4 assists per game. After the season, he announced he was entering the 2021 NBA draft and hiring an agent.

== Professional career ==
=== Greensboro Swarm (2021–2022) ===
After going undrafted in the 2021 NBA draft, Carton signed a contract with the Charlotte Hornets on August 7, 2021. However, he was waived on October 8. On October 24, he signed with the Greensboro Swarm as an affiliate player.

=== Iowa Wolves (2022–2024) ===
On November 2, 2022, Carton was named to the opening night roster for the Iowa Wolves.

On October 19, 2023, Carton signed with the Minnesota Timberwolves, but was waived the next day. On October 29, he returned to Iowa.

=== Toronto Raptors / Raptors 905 (2024) ===
On February 21, 2024, Carton signed a 10-day contract with the Toronto Raptors and on March 2, he signed a two-way contract. On December 10, he was waived by the Raptors.

=== San Diego Clippers (2025) ===
On January 29, 2025, Carton joined the San Diego Clippers. In 19 games with the Clippers, Carton averaged 13.1 points and 4.9 assists per game.

=== Birmingham Squadron (2025–present) ===
On August 21, 2025, Carton was acquired by the Birmingham Squadron in a four-team trade.

== Career statistics ==
Legend
GP	Games played	GS	Games started	MPG	Minutes per game
FG%	Field goal percentage	3P%	3-point field goal percentage	FT%	Free throw percentage
RPG	Rebounds per game	APG	Assists per game	SPG	Steals per game
BPG	Blocks per game	PPG	Points per game	**Bold**	Career high

=== NBA ===
==== Regular season ====
Year	Team	GP	GS	MPG	FG%	3P%	FT%	RPG	APG	SPG	BPG	PPG
2023–24	Toronto	**4**	0	**8.9**	**.375**	**.250**	.800	**1.0**	**.8**	.3	.0	**2.8**
2024–25	Toronto	**4**	0	8.3	.143	.000	**1.000**	**1.0**	**.8**	**.5**	.0	.8
Career		8	0	8.6	.267	.143	.833	1.0	.8	.4	.0	1.8

=== College ===
Year	Team	GP	GS	MPG	FG%	3P%	FT%	RPG	APG	SPG	BPG	PPG
2019–20	Ohio State	20	3	23.9	**.477**	**.400**	**.759**	2.8	3.0	.7	**.4**	10.4
2020–21	Marquette	**27**	**24**	**31.1**	.446	.282	.743	**4.1**	**3.4**	**1.1**	**.4**	**13.0**
Career		47	27	28.0	.457	.322	.748	3.5	3.2	.9	.4	11.9

== Personal life ==
Carton was born in Pineville, North Carolina. Carton's mother Jennifer played volleyball at the University of Colorado. His father Desi Wilson played basketball and baseball at Fairleigh Dickinson University before being selected in the 1991 Major League Baseball draft by the Texas Rangers and enjoying a short career with the San Francisco Giants. His maternal grandfather Gene Meeker played basketball at the University of Iowa during the 1950s. Carton has not seen his father since the age of four. When his mother married Dale Carton, he changed his name from Desi Junior Wilson to Desi Justice Carton.
