= Linn-Mar Community School District =

Public school district in Marion, Iowa, United States

Coordinates: 42.053779°N 91.597446°W

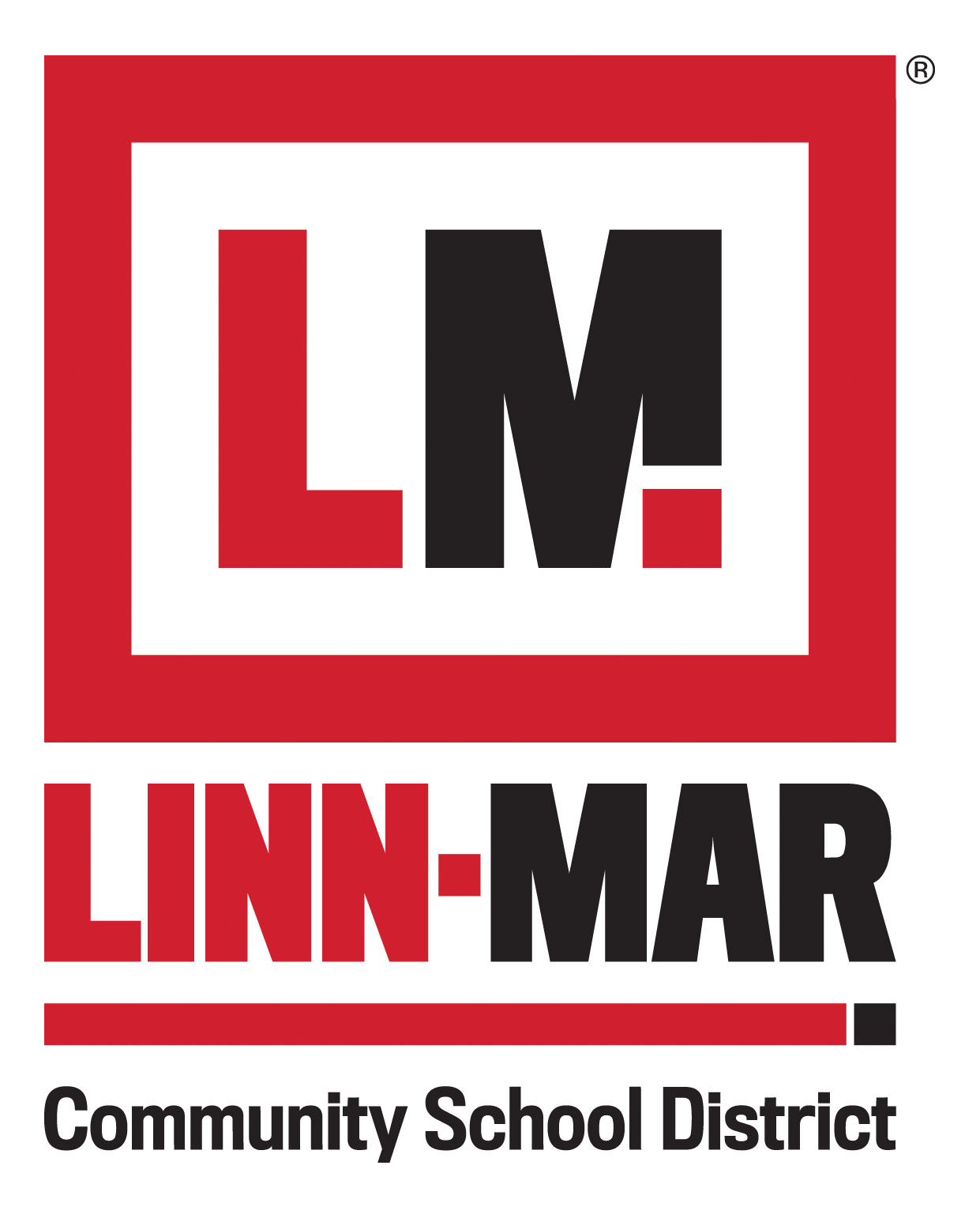

Location
- Marion, Iowa Linn County United States
- Coordinates: 42.053779, -91.597446

District information
- Type: Public school
- Motto: We are Linn-Mar!
- Grades: Pre K–12
- Established: 1948
- Superintendent: Amy Kortemeyer
- Schools: 12
- Budget: $125,895,000 (2020-21)
- NCES District ID: 1917220

Students and staff
- Students: 7690 (2022-23)
- Teachers: 518.06 FTE
- Staff: 650.69 FTE
- Student–teacher ratio: 14.84
- Athletic conference: Mississippi Valley Conference
- District mascot: Lion
- Colors: Red and black

Other information
- Website: http://www.linnmar.k12.ia.us

Linn-Mar Community School District is a public school district in Linn County, Iowa, that administrates seven elementary schools, two intermediate schools, two junior high schools and a senior high school. The district includes the northern part of Marion, Iowa, an area in Cedar Rapids, part of Robins and rural areas in the county. As of 2019, more than 7700 students were enrolled in district schools.

== History ==
The Linn-Mar Community School District was formed in 1948 when 17 sub-districts (including twelve one-room school buildings and a two-room school building) were joined together to build the Marion Rural Independent School District. At that time, 678 students were enrolled in grades K–8.

== Schools ==
The district operates twelve schools:

- Linn-Mar High School, Marion (est. 1959)
- Excelsior Middle School, Marion (est. 1995)
- Oak Ridge Middle School, Marion (est. 2003)
- Hazel Point Intermediate School, Marion (est. 2021)
- Boulder Peak Intermediate School, Marion (est. 2021)
- Bowman Woods Elementary School, Cedar Rapids (est. 1968)
- Echo Hill Elementary School, Marion (est. 2008)
- Indian Creek Elementary School, Marion (est. 1961)
- Linn Grove Elementary School, Marion (est. 2007)
- Novak Elementary School, Marion (est. 2010)
- Westfield Elementary School, Robins (est. 1999)
- Wilkins Elementary School, Marion (est. 1966)

== Referendums ==
- March 1993, district residents approved an $8.5 million bond issue to construct a new 5–6 intermediate building, fund media center expansions, construct 14 additional High School classrooms, and create additions to four elementary buildings: Bowman Woods, Indian Creek, Wilkins and Novak (current LRC building).
- February 1997, a $25 million bond proposal was voter approved. This bond helped fund the 1999 District change from a K–4, 5–6, 7–8, and 9–12 configuration to a K–5, 6–8, and 9–12 configuration. Westfield elementary was constructed and additions were made to Wilkins and Indian Creek. Excelsior was expanded to become a 6–8 building and the High School underwent a remodeled to make it a more efficient 9–12 building.
- A $12 million bond proposal allowed for the construction of Oak Ridge (originally constructed as a K–8 building) and the Bowman Woods Gymnasium. This bond proposal was approved in 2001.
- January 2006, voters approved a $27.5 million bond referendum by nearly 75% approval. The district constructed two new elementary schools (Linn Grove and Echo Hill), converted Oak Ridge to a 6–8 building and made renovations to the High School and Novak Elementary (current LRC building).
- September 2018 voters approved a $55 million bond. This bond will be utilized to fund the construction of two 5–6 grade buildings and change the district to a pre K–4, 5–6, 7–8, and 9–12 building configuration. The future construction of these buildings will provide major support to overcrowding in the current pre K–5 elementary buildings.

== SILO (School Infrastructure Local Option) ==
Voters in Linn County approved a 10-year School Infrastructure Local Option (SILO) Sales Tax on February 13, 2007. SILO tax revenues are distributed across all school districts in Linn County for the first five years of the tax. In 2008, the Iowa Legislature passed SAVE legislation which extended the penny sales tax for schools to 2029 and created an average per student allocation for school districts across the state. The increase in the sales and use tax from 5% to 6% was intended to replace the 1% SILO tax that had been in effect.

To date, SILO revenue has allowed the district to build the new Novak Elementary school, air condition five schools, construct a 6,000 seat multipurpose stadium, install additional high school parking, purchase property to relocate Transportation and Operations & Maintenance, relocate the baseball and softball fields to the Oak Ridge property and construct an indoor aquatics center.

== Enrollment ==
From 2000 to 2017 Linn-Mar’s certified enrollment number grew at an average yearly rate of 2.24%.

=== Fall enrollment per year (since 2000) ===
2000: 4,998 2001: 5,149 2002: 5,263 2003: 5,412 2004: 5,628 2005: 5,780 2006: 6,196 2007: 6,371 2008: 6,490 2009: 6,601 2010: 6,644 2011: 6,729 2012: 6,730 2013: 6,880 2014: 6,943 2015: 7,145 2016: 7,198 2017: 7,313 2018: 7,436 2019: 7,557 2020: 7,676 2021: 7,598

== Test data ==
In the 2017-2018 school year Linn-Mar Community School District had a reading proficiency level of 84.1% compared to a state level of 77%. From 2014-2018 district ACT test scores averaged 24.34. The state average for the same timeframe was 21.675. In 2016 the national average for the ACT test was 20.8.
