= JP Flynn =

Up and coming catering (born 2007)

No. 60
- Position: Center/Guard

Personal information
- Born: August 30, 1993 (age 33); Knoxville, Tennessee, U.S.
- Listed height: 6 ft 5 in (1.96 m)
- Listed weight: 320 lb (145 kg)

Career information
- High school: Bettendorf (Bettendorf, Iowa)
- College: Montana State
- NFL draft: 2017: undrafted

Career history
- San Francisco 49ers (2017–2018)

Awards and highlights
- 2× First-team All-Big Sky (2014, 2016); Third-team All-Big Sky (2013)
- Stats at Pro Football Reference

John Paul Flynn (born August 30, 1993) is an American former football offensive lineman. He played college football at Montana State.

== College career ==
Flynn started in 43 consecutive games for Montana State. Flynn earned All-Big Sky first-team awards in 2014 and 2016. In 2013 Flynn earned All-Big Sky third-team award.

== Professional career ==
Flynn went undrafted in the 2017 NFL draft. On May 4, 2017, Flynn was signed by the San Francisco 49ers.

Flynn was waived on September 2, 2017 but was re-signed the next day to the 49ers' practice squad. On November 13, 2017, Flynn was placed on practice squad injured reserve.

On July 26, 2018, Flynn signed a two-year contract with the 49ers. On August 31, 2018, Flynn was waived/injured but reverted to the team's injured reserve for the second year in a row on September 1, 2018. He was released on January 5, 2019.
