= Bettendorf Community School District =

Public school district in Bettendorf, Iowa, United States

Location
- Bettendorf, Iowa Scott County United States

District information
- Type: Public
- Grades: Pre-kindergarten-12
- Established: 1907
- Superintendent: Dr. John W. Elkin (interim)
- Accreditation: Iowa Department of Education
- Schools: 7
- Budget: $63,149,000 (2020-21)
- NCES District ID: 1904860

Students and staff
- Students: 4,633 (2022-23)
- Teachers: 309.28 FTE
- Staff: 280.29 FTE
- Student–teacher ratio: 14.98
- Athletic conference: Mississippi Athletic Conference

Other information
- Website: www.bettschools.org

The Bettendorf Community School District is a public school district in Scott County, Iowa, United States, The school district covers 9 square miles (23 km^{2}) that includes the western, northern and central areas of Bettendorf, where it is based, and a small section of the east edge of Davenport.

Founded in 1907, the Bettendorf School District operates nine school buildings, all in the city of Bettendorf.

== List of schools ==
High School

- Bettendorf High School

Alternative School

- Thomas Edison Academy

Middle School

- Bettendorf Middle School

Elementary Schools

- Grant Wood
- Herbert Hoover
- Mark Twain
- Neil Armstrong
- Paul Norton

== History ==
Bettendorf Community School District was officially established in 1907, shortly after the town of Gilbert was renamed to Bettendorf. In its early years, the district operated on a smaller scale. Without a dedicated secondary facility, students usually went to other local high schools in Davenport or LeClaire.

In 1951: Bettendorf High School opened up, during its beginning years: it was grades 7 - 12, which is now 9 - 12. In the 1960's: Rapid enrollment led to a temporary space crisis, leaving the district renting store fronts as classes. In 1971 (Just 20 years after Bettendorf High School opened up): The high school facility on 18th Street was completed, and at the time: was surrounded by Agricultural land.

To this day: it's now known as a powerhouse for high school sports in Iowa, and a 90% graduation rate.
