= Jason Bohannon =

American basketball player

- Bohannon playing for Wisconsin in 2010

Personal information
- Born: December 30, 1987 (age 38) Iowa City, Iowa, U.S.
- Listed height: 6 ft 2 in (1.88 m)
- Listed weight: 200 lb (91 kg)

Career information
- High school: Linn-Mar (Marion, Iowa)
- College: Wisconsin (2006–2010)
- NBA draft: 2010: undrafted
- Playing career: 2010–2011
- Position: Shooting guard
- Number: 12

Career history
- 2010–2011: Iowa Energy
- 2011: USC Heidelberg

Career highlights
- Big Ten Sixth Man of the Year (2008); Third-team All-Big Ten (2010); Iowa Mr. Basketball (2006)

Jason Gordon Bohannon (born December 30, 1987) is an American former professional basketball player who last played for USC Heidelberg in Germany. He plays mainly as a shooting guard.

== College career ==
On January 24, 2010, Bohannon reached the 1,000 point milestone during a 79–71 overtime win over the Penn State Nittany Lions.

== Accomplishments ==
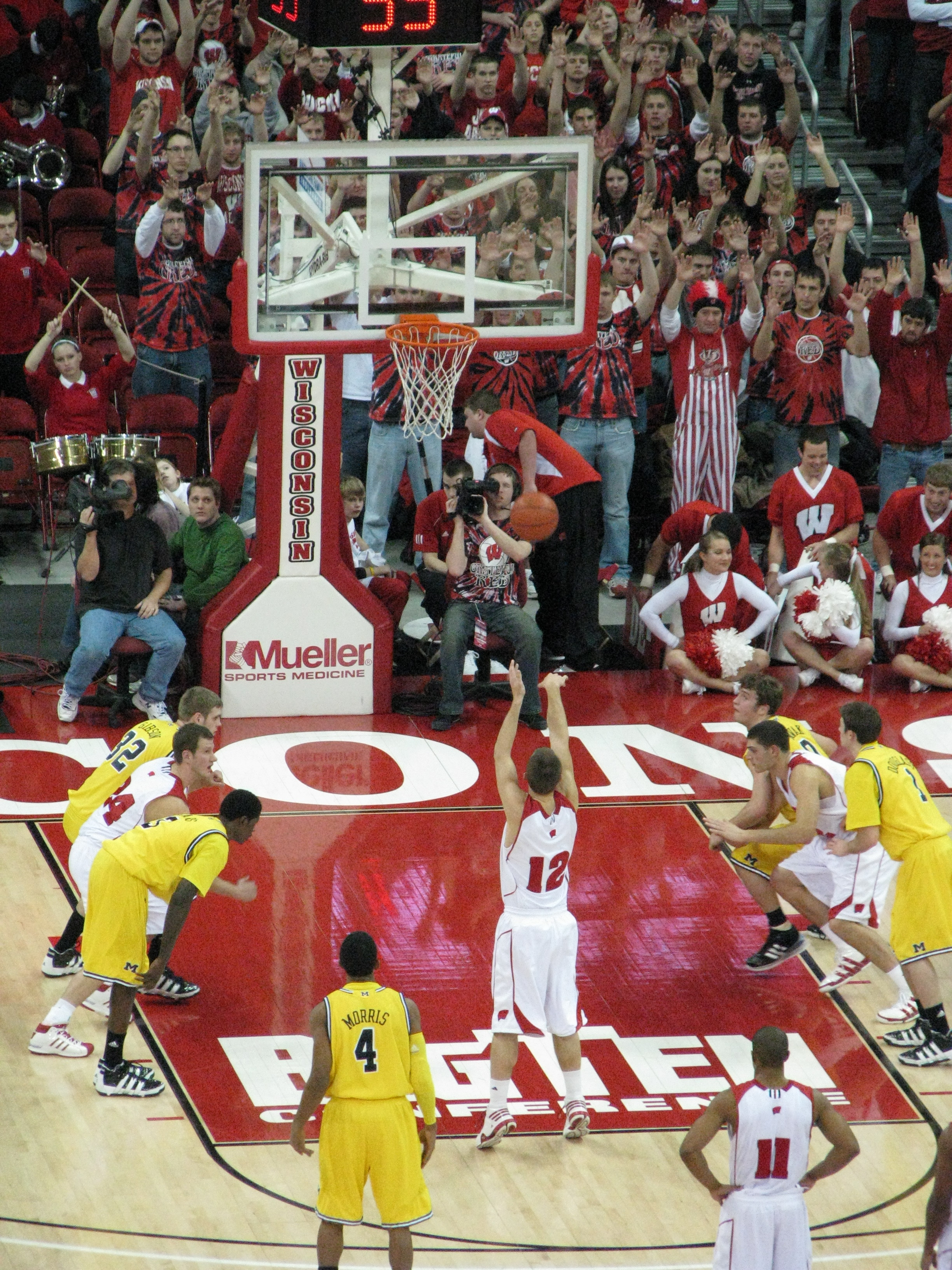
Bohannon shoots a free throw against Michigan in 2010

College:

Big Ten Sixth Man of the Year in 2008

Member of Big Ten Regular Season Championship Team and Tournament championship Team in 2008

High School:

Iowa Mr. Basketball in 2006

Iowa Gatorade Player of the Year in Iowa in 2006

Iowa Newspaper Association All-State first team in 2004, 2005, and 2006

Iowa High School State Championship in 2004

Iowa High School State Runner-up in 2005

Iowa High School State 4th place in 2006

== Stats ==
High School: 2003–2004: averaged 16.5 points, 5.2 rebounds and 3.1 assists

2004–2005: averaged 20.8 points, 4.5 rebounds and 4.0 assists

2005–2006: averaged 27 points, 5.8 rebounds and 3.8 assists

Career High: 45 points

College:

2006–07: Games Played: 33 Games Started: 0 Averages: 15.0 min, 4.6 points, 1.1 assists, 1.5 rebounds, 44.5% field goals, 36.5% threes, 83.9% free throws

2007–08: Games Played: 36 Games Started: 2 Averages: 26.3 min, 8.2 points, 1.4 assists, 2.4 rebounds, 42.9% field goals, 39.3% threes, 86.7% free throws

2008–09 Games Played: 33 Games Started: 33 Averages: 33.1 min, 10.3 points, 1.7 assists, 3.1 rebounds, 38.1% field goals, 36.6% threes, 81.0% free throws

2009–10 Games Played: 33 Games Started: 33 Averages: 36.8 min, 11.6 points, 2.2 assists, 3.6 rebounds, 45.8% field goals, 38.9% threes, 87.3% free throws

Career Highs: 43 min, 30 points, 5 assists, 9 reb, 3 steals, 11–16 field goals, 7–11 threes, 6–6 free throws

== Professional career ==
Bohannon made the NBA D-League's Iowa Energy after trying out for the team during the summer of 2010. He was waived on November 17 then re-signed with the Energy just six weeks later.

Later that season, he signed with USC Heidelberg, a basketball team in Germany.

== Personal life ==
Bohannon's father, Gordy, played quarterback for Iowa. Bohannon has three brothers, Jordan, Matt and Zach. Jordan played basketball for Iowa. Matt played for Northern Iowa, and Zach played for Air Force and Wisconsin.

Preceded by Josh Van Es	Iowa "Mr. Basketball" Award; 2006	Succeeded by Clayton Vette
