= List of NCAA Division I men's basketball career games played leaders =

In the National Collegiate Athletic Association (NCAA), the statistic for total games played in Division I men's basketball helps opposing coaches to monitor the extent that a particular player is used on a team. By definition, a player has "played in a game" when he enters the contest via substitution or by starting the contest. All that is required is that he is one of the five players for a team on the court for a minimal time of one second according to the game clock.

Through the 2024–25 season, the all-time leader in games played is Jordan Bohannon, who played six seasons at Iowa and appeared in 179 games. Bohannon benefited from two special provisions of NCAA rules that allowed him to play in more than the standard four seasons.

Normally, the only way for a player to play in more than four NCAA seasons is to qualify for a "medical redshirt", officially known by the NCAA as a "hardship waiver". To be eligible, a player must have participated in fewer than one third of his team's scheduled games in that season, and cannot have participated in any games in the second half of the season. Bohannon received a medical redshirt in 2019–20, a season in which he played 10 games. Several other players on the career leaders list benefited from this rule. Bohannon also benefited from a special NCAA eligibility waiver for the 2020–21 season, which was so heavily disrupted by COVID-19 that the NCAA announced it would not count that season against any player's period of eligibility. He chose to play a final season in 2021–22.

== Key ==
Pos.	G	F	C	Ref.
Position	Guard	Forward	Center	References

Team (X)	Denotes the number of times a player from that school appears on the list
^	Player still active in NCAA Division I

== Top 25 games played leaders ==
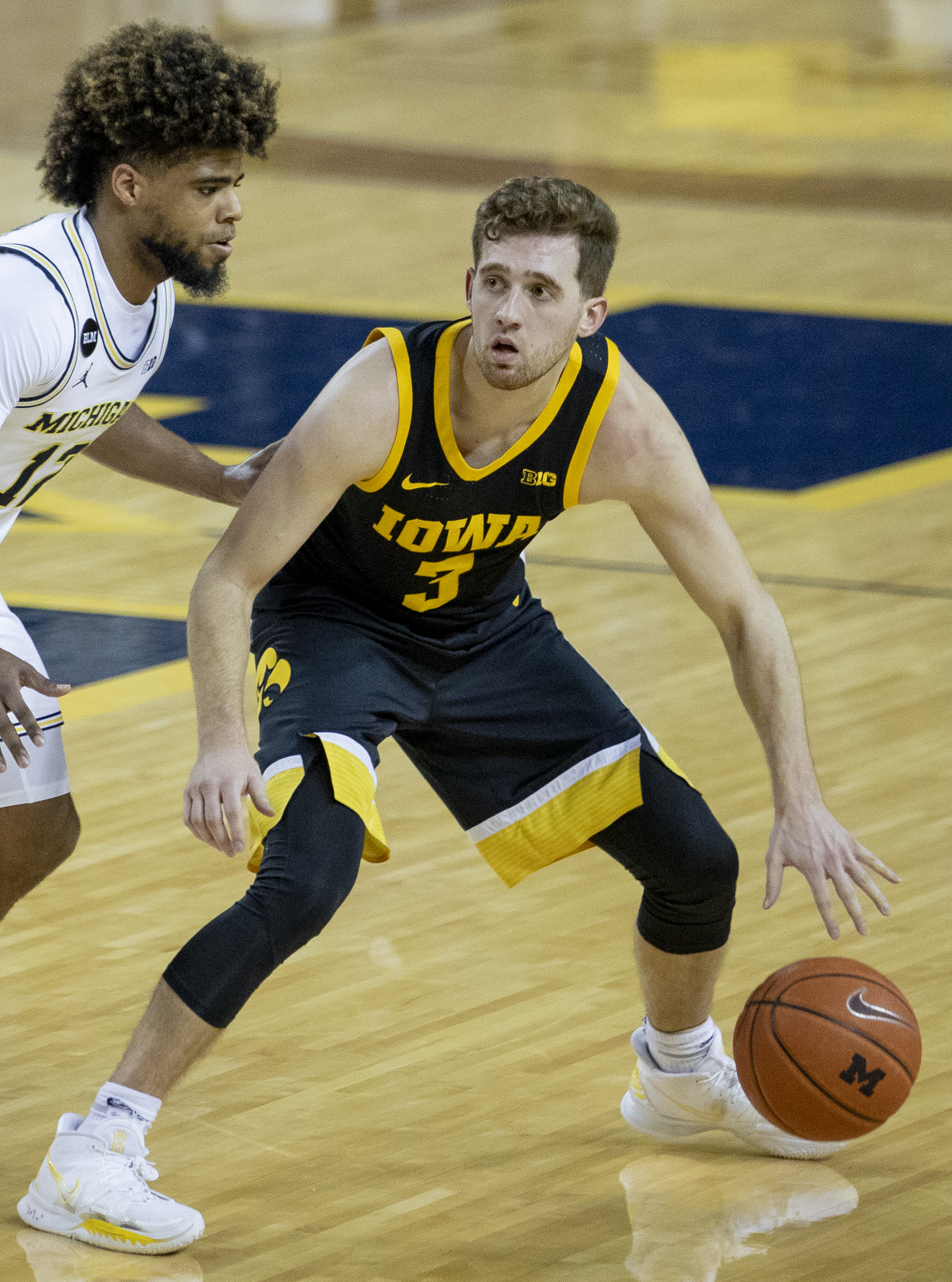
Jordan Bohannon is the all-time leader in games played with 179.

Includes ties for 25th.

Player	Pos.	Team(s)	Games played	Career start	Career end	Medical redshirt?	COVID waiver?	Ref.
Jordan Bohannon	G	Iowa	179	2016	2022	✓	✓	
R. J. Davis	G	North Carolina	175	2020	2025	✗	✓	
Caleb Love	G	North Carolina (2) / Arizona	174	2020	2025	✗	✓	
Dajuan Harris Jr.	G	Kansas	173	2020	2025	✗	✓	
J'Wan Roberts	F	Houston	173	2020	2025	✗	✓	
Jake Wolfe	G	Lipscomb / Morehead State / Indiana State	173	2018	2024 (Note: Wolfe got injured in his sophomore season at Lipscomb and used a medical redshirt after appearing in just 9 games.)	✓	✓	
Jalen Coleman-Lands	G	Illinois / DePaul / Iowa State / Kansas (2)	172	2015	2022 (Note: Although Coleman-Lands' career has spanned seven seasons, he has only played in six. He played from 2015–2017 at Illinois before transferring to DePaul, sitting out the 2017–18 season due to then-current NCAA transfer regulations. He then received a medical redshirt season in 2018–19, and played the full 2019–20 season at DePaul. Coleman-Lands then received a sixth season of eligibility from the NCAA for 2020–21, playing at Iowa State, and then transferred to Kansas, taking advantage of the NCAA's COVID-19 eligibility waiver.)	✓	✓	
Chevez Goodwin	F	Charleston / Wofford / USC	172	2016	2022 (Note: Although Goodwin's career has spanned six seasons, he has only played in five. He played at Charleston in the 2016–17 season before transferring to Wofford, sitting out the 2017–18 season due to then-current NCAA transfer regulations. After graduating from Wofford in 2020, Goodwin transferred to USC and was immediately eligible to play as a graduate transfer.)	✗	✓	
Justin Kier	G	George Mason / Georgia / Arizona (2)	170	2016	2022	✓	✓	
Mark Sears	G	Ohio / Alabama	170	2020	2025	✗	✓	
Armando Bacot	C / F	North Carolina (3)	169	2019	2024	✗	✓	
Hassan Diarra	G	Texas A&M / UConn	169	2019	2024	✗	✓	
Mason Gillis	F	Purdue / Duke	169	2019	2024	✗	✓	
Quincy Guerrier	F	Syracuse / Oregon / Illinois (2)	169	2019	2024	✗	✓	
Ryan Kalkbrenner	C	Creighton	169	2020	2025	✗	✓	
Robert Allen	F	Samford / Ole Miss / North Texas	168	2018	2024 (Note: Allen got injured in his senior season at Ole Miss and used a medical redshirt after appearing in just 8 games.)	✓	✓	
Johni Broome	F / C	Morehead State (2) / Auburn	168	2020	2025	✗	✓	
Darius McGhee	G	Liberty	168	2018	2023	✗	✓	
Steven Ashworth	G	Utah State / Creighton (2)	167	2020	2025	✗	✓	
Garrison Brooks	F	North Carolina (4) / Mississippi State	167	2017	2022	✗	✓	
Reggie Chaney	F	Arkansas / Houston (2)	167	2018	2023	✗	✓	
Chase Hunter	G	Clemson	167	2019	2025	✓	✓	
Mitch Lightfoot	F	Kansas (3)	167	2016	2022 (Note: Although Lightfoot's career has spanned six seasons, he has only played in five. He played no games as a redshirt in the 2019–20 season.)	✗	✓	
Cameron Matthews	F	Mississippi State (2)	167	2020	2025	✗	✓	
Ethan Morton	G	Purdue (2) / Colorado State	167	2020	2025	✗	✓	
Garrett Sturtz	G	Drake	167	2018	2023	✗	✓	
John Tonje	G	Colorado State (2) / Missouri / Wisconsin	167	2019	2025	✓	✓	

== Leaders without COVID-19 waiver ==
The overall top 25 is completely occupied by players who were active in the 2020–21 season and benefited from the COVID-19 waiver. The last players eligible to take advantage of this waiver will not complete their college eligibility until 2024–25, not counting any potential medical redshirt season in 2021–22 or later. For this reason, a separate list consisting solely of players who did not benefit from the waiver is being maintained.

Includes ties for 25th.

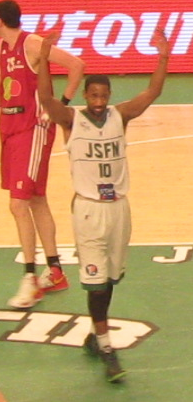
David Lighty has the most all-time games among pre-COVID era players.

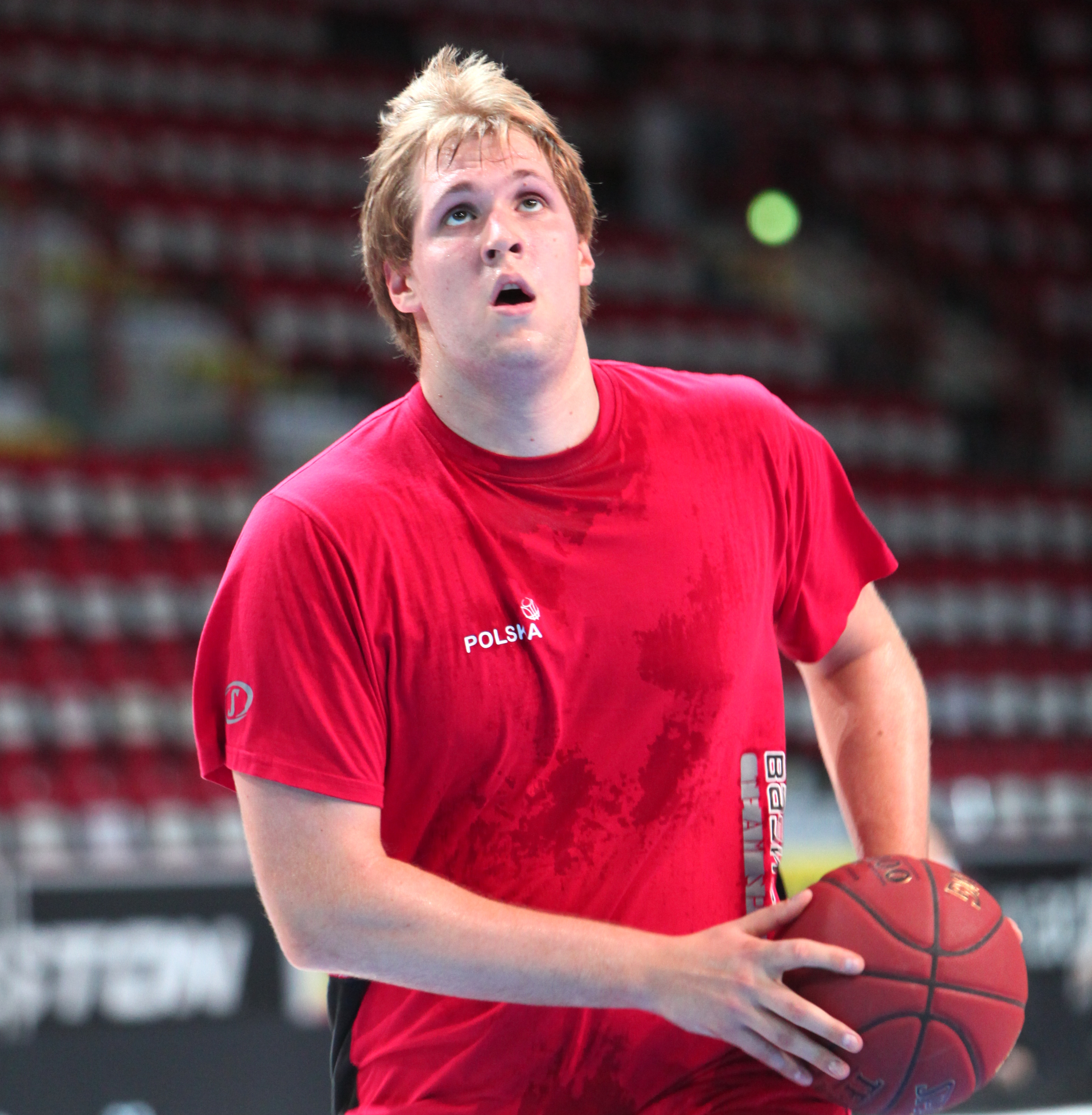
Przemek Karnowski played in 152 games between 2012 and 2017.

Player	Pos.	Team(s)	Games played	Career start	Career end	Medical redshirt?	Ref.
David Lighty	G/F	Ohio State	157	2006	2011	✓	
Jakob Gollon	F	Mercer	154	2008	2014	✓ (×2)	
Nate Austin	F/C	BYU	153	2011	2016	✓	
Josh Perkins	G	Gonzaga	153	2014	2019	✓	
Przemek Karnowski	C	Gonzaga (2)	152	2012	2017	✓	
Darius Miller	G/F	Kentucky	152	2008	2012	✗	
Deon Thompson	F	North Carolina	152	2006	2010	✗	
Nate Britt	G	North Carolina (2)	151	2013	2017	✗	
Isaiah Hicks	F	North Carolina (3)	151	2013	2017	✗	
Walter Hodge	G	Florida	151	2005	2009	✗	
Wayne Turner	G	Kentucky (2)	151	1995	1999	✗	
Antonio Anderson	F	Memphis	150	2005	2009	✗	
Nigel Hayes	F	Wisconsin	150	2013	2017	✗	
Amile Jefferson	F	Duke	150	2012	2017	✓	
Patric Young	C/F	Florida (2)	150	2010	2014	✗	
Joey Dorsey	C	Memphis (2)	149	2004	2008	✗	
Lamar Patterson	G/F	Pittsburgh	149	2009	2014	✓	
Ethan Wragge	F	Creighton	149	2009	2014	✓	
Mike Best	F/C	UC Irvine	148	2011	2016	✓	
Phil Booth	G	Villanova	148	2014	2019	✓	
Aaron Craft	G	Ohio State (2)	148	2010	2014	✗	
Robert Dozier	F	Memphis (3)	148	2005	2009	✗	
Josh Gasser	G	Wisconsin (2)	148	2010	2015 (Note: Although Gasser's career spanned five seasons, he only played in four. He played no games as a redshirt in the 2012–13 season.)	✗	
Brice Johnson	F	North Carolina (4)	148	2012	2016	✗	
Bronson Koenig	G	Wisconsin (3)	148	2013	2017	✗	
Christian Laettner	F/C	Duke (2)	148	1988	1992	✗	
Kyle Singler	F	Duke (3)	148	2007	2011	✗	
