= Grant Gibbs (basketball) =

American basketball player and coach

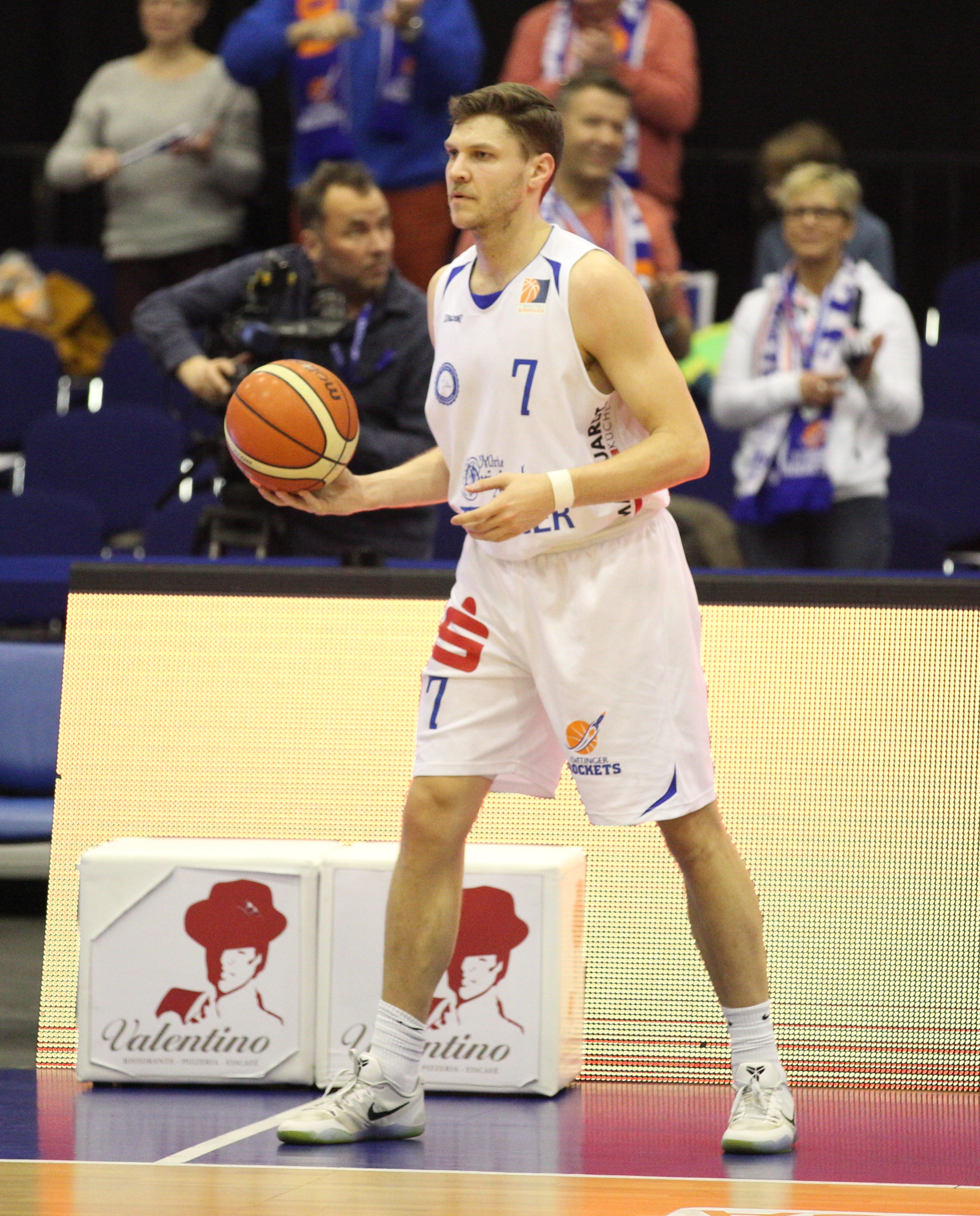
- Gibbs with Rockets in 2017

Oklahoma City Thunder
- Title: Assistant coach
- League: NBA

Personal information
- Born: July 22, 1989 (age 37) Marion, Iowa, U.S.
- Listed height: 196 cm (6 ft 5 in)
- Listed weight: 96 kg (212 lb)

Career information
- High school: Linn-Mar (Marion, Iowa)
- College: Gonzaga (2008–2010); Creighton (2011–2014)
- NBA draft: 2014: undrafted
- Playing career: 2014–2017
- Position: Shooting guard / small forward
- Coaching career: 2017–present

Career history

Playing
- 2014–2016: Landstede Zwolle
- 2016–2017: Rockets Gotha

Coaching
- 2017–2019: Oklahoma City Blue (assistant)
- 2019–2022: Oklahoma City Blue
- 2022–present: Oklahoma City Thunder (assistant)

Career highlights
- As assistant coach: NBA champion (2025); As player: All-DBL Team (2016); DBL Most Improved Player (2016)

Grant Randall Gibbs (born July 22, 1989) is an American basketball coach and former player who is an assistant coach of the Oklahoma City Thunder of the National Basketball Association. Standing at 196 cm (6 ft 5 in), Gibbs used to play as shooting guard or small forward.

== Professional career ==
=== Landstede Zwolle (2014–2016) ===
In the 2015–16 season, while playing for Landstede Zwolle, Gibbs was named the DBL Most Improved Player and was awarded a spot in the All-DBL Team.

=== Oettinger Rockets (2016–2017) ===
In August 2016, Gibbs signed with Oettinger Rockets of the German second division ProA.

== Coaching career ==
=== Oklahoma City Blue (2017–2022) ===
In October 2017, Gibbs signed as an assistant coach with the Oklahoma City Blue of the NBA G League. On August 2, 2019, he was promoted to the position of head coach for the Blue after former coach Mark Daigneault accepted an assistant coach position on the Oklahoma City Thunder, the NBA affiliate of the Blue.

=== Oklahoma City Thunder (2022–present) ===
On September 23, 2022, the Thunder announced Gibbs will join the Thunder coaching staff after serving as head coach of the Oklahoma City Blue for the past three seasons. Gibbs became the third Blue head coach to join the Thunder coaching staff.

== Head coaching record ==
=== NBA G League ===
Team	Year	G	W	L	W–L%	Finish	PG	PW	PL	PW–L%	Result
Oklahoma City	2019–20	42	20	22	.476	3rd in Western	—	—	—	—	Season cancelled
Oklahoma City	2020–21	15	8	7	.533	9th in Western	—	—	—	—	Missed playoffs
Oklahoma City	2021–22	35	15	20	.429	10th in Western	—	—	—	—	Missed playoffs
Career		92	43	49	.467		—	—	—	—	
