= Linn-Mar High School =

Public secondary school in Marion, Iowa, United States

Location
- 3111 North 10th Street; Marion, Iowa 52302; United States; 42°03′11″N 91°35′53″W

Information
- Type: Public secondary school
- Opened: 1959; 67 years ago
- School district: Linn-Mar Community School District
- Superintendent: Dr.Nathan Wear
- CEEB code: 162763
- Principal: Jeff Gustason
- Teaching staff: 131.37 (on an FTE basis)
- Grades: 9-12
- Enrollment: 2,222 (2023–2024)
- Student to teacher ratio: 16.91
- Colours: Red and black
- Athletics conference: Mississippi Valley Conference
- Nickname: Lions
- Newspaper: Life
- Yearbook: Medallion
- Website: www.linnmar.k12.ia.us

Linn-Mar High School is a public high school, part of the Linn-Mar Community School District. It serves students in grades 9 through 12 and is located in Marion, Iowa.

== History ==
Linn-Mar High School opened in the fall of 1959. It was built at a cost of $243,325 and housed 177 students when it opened. The school board had a naming contest for the school; a then-eighth grade student won $25 for submitting Linn-Mar, judged the best of 75 entries.

In 2016, Newsweek named Linn-Mar to its list of best high schools for low-income students.

The Linn-Mar High School began constructing a new performance hall in 2024. This project was completed in January 2026 with a ribbon cutting ceremony in February of 2026.

In March 2025, the building plans for an Indoor Athletic Activity Space were proposed, and later accepted in October of the same year. This project is estimated to cost 53.4 million dollars. The funds for the center will come solely from the Linn-Mar District's existing budgets and will not penetrate the surrounding area's taxes.

== Athletics ==
LMHS athletic teams are nicknamed the Lions and compete in the Mississippi Valley Conference. A new 6,000-seat athletics stadium opened in 2011, and a new aquatic facility opened in 2013. In 2024, a new 8 court tennis complex was opened.

State Championships
Sport	Year(s)
Basketball (boys)	1983, 2004, 2007, 2011
Basketball (girls)	1985, 2010
Football	1985, 1989, 1990
Golf (coed)	1983, 1997, 2006
Soccer (boys)	2015
Tennis (boys)	1988, 2015, 2018
Track and field (boys)	2013
Cross Country (boys)	2014

== Performing arts ==
Linn-Mar has four competitive show choirs, with the newest one being added for the 2026-2027 season, the mixed prep "Uproar". Along with the mixed-gender "10th Street Edition", "In Step" as well as the all-female "Hi-Style". 10th Street was undefeated in its 2018, 2022, 2023, 2024 and 2025 competition seasons. In 2023, 10th Street Edition came first in the Show Choir Nationals at the Grand Ole Opry House in Nashville, Tennessee. The program hosts an annual competition entitled "Supernova". LMHS also has a competitive marching band and hosts an annual competition for that discipline.

The school has received the Grammy Signature School award twice.

== Notable alumni ==
- Jason Bohannon, ProA professional basketball player
- Jordan Bohannon, basketball player for the Iowa Wolves
- Lisa Bluder, former NCAA women's basketball head coach
- Marcus Paige, former NBA guard and current assistant coach for the Charlotte 49ers
- David Parry, NFL defensive tackle
- Kiah Stokes, 4x WNBA champion, currently playing for the Golden State Valkyries
- Grant Gibbs, assistant coach for Oklahoma City Thunder

== See also ==
- List of high schools in Iowa
