= Darien Porter =

American football player (born 2001)

No. 26 – Las Vegas Raiders
- Position: Cornerback
- Roster status: Active

Personal information
- Born: January 6, 2001 (age 25)
- Listed height: 6 ft 2 in (1.88 m)
- Listed weight: 195 lb (88 kg)

Career information
- High school: Bettendorf (IA)
- College: Iowa State (2019–2024)
- NFL draft: 2025: 3rd round, 68th overall pick

Career history
- Las Vegas Raiders (2025–present)

Career NFL statistics as of Week 7, 2026
- Tackles: 61
- Fumble recoveries: 2
- Pass deflections: 8
- Stats at Pro Football Reference

Darien Porter (born January 6, 2001) is an American professional football cornerback for the Las Vegas Raiders of the National Football League (NFL). He played college football for the Iowa State Cyclones and was selected by the Raiders in the third round of the 2025 NFL draft.

== Early life ==
Porter attended Bettendorf High School in Bettendorf, Iowa, where he played wide receiver and cornerback. As a senior he had 27 receptions for 440 yards and seven touchdowns. Porter committed to Iowa State University to play college football. He also ran track in high school and broke the Iowa Class 4A state 400 meter record with a 46.99.

== College career ==
Porter played wide receiver his first three years at Iowa State from 2019 to 2021 before switching to cornerback prior to the 2022 season. From 2019 to 2023, he played in 40 games, mostly on special teams, and had 33 tackles and blocked three punts. In 2024, he became a starter for the first time.

== Professional career ==
Pre-draft measurables
Height	Weight	Arm length	Hand span	Wingspan	40-yard dash	10-yard split	20-yard split	20-yard shuttle	Three-cone drill	Vertical jump	Broad jump
6 ft 2 7/8 in (1.90 m)	195 lb (88 kg)	33 1/8 in (0.84 m)	9 in (0.23 m)	6 ft 8 in (2.03 m)	4.30 s	1.49 s	2.54 s	4.04 s	6.71 s	36.5 in (0.93 m)	10 ft 11 in (3.33 m)
All values from NFL Combine

Porter was selected by the Las Vegas Raiders with the 68th pick in the third round of the 2025 NFL draft.

== NFL career statistics ==
Year	Team	Games		Tackles					Interceptions						Fumbles				
Year	Team	GP	GS	Cmb	Solo	Ast	Sck	TFL	Int	Yds	Avg	Lng	TD	PD	FF	Fum	FR	Yds	TD
2025	LV	17	10	42	29	13	0.0	0	0	0	0.0	0	0	3	0	0	1	0	0
Career		17	10	42	29	13	0.0	0	0	0	0.0	0	0	3	0	0	1	0	0
