= Bettendorf High School =

Public school district in Bettendorf, Iowa, United States

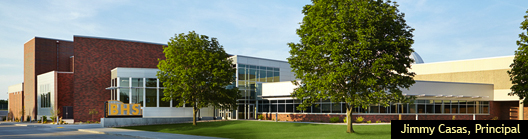
- Bettendorf High front view from 18th Street

Location
- 3333 18th St; Bettendorf, Iowa 52722; United States; 41°33′23″N 90°29′51″W

Information
- Type: Public secondary school
- Established: 1951
- Superintendent: Michelle Morse
- Principal: Kristy Cleppe
- Teaching staff: 92.89 (FTE)
- Grades: 9–12
- Enrollment: 1,433 (2024–2025)
- Student to teacher ratio: 15.43
- Colors: Black and Gold
- Athletics: Baseball, basketball, cheerleading, color guard, cross country, dance, football, golf, marching band, soccer, softball, swimming, tennis, track, volleyball, wrestling
- Athletics conference: Mississippi Athletic Conference
- Mascot: Bulldogs
- Website: www.bhs.bettendorf.k12.ia.us

Bettendorf High School (BHS) is a public four-year comprehensive high school located in Bettendorf, Iowa and is part of the Bettendorf Community School District.

== History ==
=== Early history ===
Prior to its opening in 1951, there was no high school in Bettendorf. High school-age students living in the city had to go to Davenport High School or Le Claire High School to receive their secondary education.

The original BHS building was completed in 1951 at a site between 21st and 23rd streets south of Central Avenue. In its very early years, the high school housed seventh through 12th grade students, although junior high students were moved by the late 1950s.

The community of Bettendorf quickly grew during the 1950s and 1960s, and by the early 1960s, the district had outgrown the school due to increasing enrollment. Students walked to some classes in rented store fronts on State and Grant Streets, while an annex building (which later became Neil Armstrong Elementary) also helped serve students. By 1971, with enrollment still growing at a fast pace, plans were started to build a new high school along 18th Street in the northern part of the city, roughly 1½ miles north of Middle Road.

The former BHS building had a track/baseball field on the front side and a football field on the back side; both are still evident at the site. The old school's athletic facilities were used for a number of years after the opening of the new high school. The old football field was used on a varsity level until 1980, when Touvelle Stadium was completed, while the old BHS gymnasium was utilized by lower level teams until the mid-1980s. Today, the old BHS building is the headquarters for the Mississippi Bend Area Education Agency District 9, which oversees public school education across east-central Iowa.

=== Current high school ===
The current high school building was completed in 1973, at a cost of roughly $3 million. At the time of its opening, BHS was on the edge of town, surrounded by mostly undeveloped land. A subsequent addition added a new industrial arts/locker room and an athletic stadium completed in 1980. The six-building, air-conditioned complex is highlighted by a landscaped inner courtyard, planetarium, library/media center, computer labs, a 405-seat auditorium, and a field house with a 6-lane, 25-yard swimming pool. In 2007, an addition to the music and drama area was completed.

A new 7,500-square-foot (700 m^{2}) facility is attached to the east side of the high school and accessible to all athletic and physical education areas. The center houses weights and exercise and cardiovascular equipment.

A group of community members organized the BHS Fitness Education Center Committee and raised $300,000 in funds for the fitness education center at Bettendorf High School. The Bettendorf School Board matched $300,000 to fund the $600,000 project. The project was completed in the summer of 2002.

In 2010, copies of the student newspaper, The Growl, were confiscated by school administrators because of an article about inconsistent disciplinary action against students, specifically athletes.

Renovations to the high school took about three years to complete from October 2011 to March 2013, with an estimated cost of $16.2 million.

A $3.25 million renovation project to TouVelle Stadium began in May and finished in August, in time for the 2014 season. The upgrades replaced the stadium's grass field with synthetic turf, reconfiguration of the eight-lane track and a new lighting system among others.

The Bettendorf High School football team, established in 1952, has been a cornerstone of athletics at the school. The team has achieved several championships and milestones since its founding. In 2002, the archival website www.bettendorffootball.com launched, which provides access to information about the team's game records, player highlights, and history.

== Music ==
The music department has a marching band, freshmen band, symphonic band, orchestra, wind ensemble, jazz band, pep band, chorus, including “Bett Singers”, “Advanced Treble Choir”, and a Concert Choir, a prep group show choir named 'Audio Intensity', and a show choir named 'Surround Sound'.

== Athletics ==
The Bulldogs compete in the Mississippi Athletic Conference(MAC), in the following sports:

- Summer: Baseball and softball
- Fall: Football, volleyball, girls' swimming, boys'cross country, girls' cross country, boys' golf
- Winter: Boys' basketball, girls' basketball, girls' bowling, boys’ bowling, boys' swimming, wrestling
- Spring: Boys' track and field, girls' track and field, boys' soccer, girls' soccer, boys' tennis, girls' tennis, girls' golf

=== State championships ===
- Boys' Basketball (2-time State Champions - 1986, 2005)
- Girls' Basketball - 1994 Class 4A State Champions
- Girls' Cross Country (3-time State Champions (1977, 1984, 1987)
- Football (7-time Class 4A State Champions - 1981, 1987, 1988, 1991, 1992, 2004, 2007)
- Boys' Golf (5-time State Champions - 1978, 2004, 2005, 2006, 2007)
- Boys' Soccer (3-time State Champions - 1995, 1999, 2004)
- Girls' Soccer (2-time State Champions - 1998, 2024)
- Boys' Swimming (4-time state Champions - 1978, 1986, 1999, 2007)
- Girls' Swimming (7-time state Champions - 1990, 1991, 1992, 1999, 2000, 2001, 2002)
- Boys' Tennis - 2004 Class 2A State Champions
- Girls' Tennis (7-time Class 2A State Champions - 1995, 1996, 1997, 1998, 1999, 2000, 2003)
- Girls' Track and Field (3-time Class 3A State Champions - 1986, 1989, 1990)
- Volleyball (2-time Class 5A State Champions - 2012, 2013)
- Wrestling (4-time Class 3A State Champions - 1981, 1982, 2012, 2014)
- Wrestling (2-time Class 3A State Duals Champions - 2012, 2014)

== Notable alumni ==
=== Entertainment ===
- Scott Beck, screenwriter, director
- Bryan Woods, screenwriter, director
- Frank Fritz, American Pickers
- Eric Christian Olsen, actor
- Linnea Quigley, actress
- Mike Wolfe, American Pickers

=== Journalism ===
- Amber Hunt, journalist, podcaster
- Lana Zak, Journalist, CBS

=== Public service ===
- Thomas D. Waterman, justice, Iowa Supreme Court
- Stephen P. Carroll, Judge, District Court of Iowa; adjunct professor, Drake Law School

=== Sports ===
- Pat Angerer, former NFL linebacker for the Indianapolis Colts (2010–2013) and Atlanta Falcons (2014)
- Tavian Banks, former NFL running back for the Jacksonville Jaguars (1998–2000) and New Orleans Saints (2002–2004)
- D.J. Carton, NBA player for the Greensboro Swarm of the G League
- JP Flynn, former NFL offensive lineman for the San Francisco 49ers
- Jordan Johnson, UFC Middleweight
- Mark Kerr, 2-time NCAA Wrestling Champion; retired MMA fighter; 2-time UFC Heavyweight Tournament Winner
- Robbie Lawler, MMA fighter, former UFC Welterweight Champion
- Michael "Drew" McFedries, former UFC fighter
- Pat Miletich, retired mixed martial artist, first UFC Welterweight Champion, UFC Hall of Fame member
- Darien Porter, NFL cornerback for the Las Vegas Raiders
- Andrew Yohe, U.S. Paralympian, Sled Hockey
- Carter Bell, United Football League wide receiver for the UFL 2026 champion Louisville Kings

== See also ==
- List of high schools in Iowa
