= 2023–24 Charlotte Hornets season =

2023–24 NBA season by team

- Head coach: Steve Clifford
- President: Fred Whitfield
- General manager: Mitch Kupchak
- Owner(s): Gabe Plotkin & Rick Schnall
- Arena: Spectrum Center

Results
- Record: 21–61 (.256)
- Place: Division: 4th (Southeast); Conference: 13th (Eastern)
- Playoff finish: Did not qualify
- Stats at Basketball Reference

Local media
- Television: Bally Sports South · Bally Sports Southeast
- Radio: WFNZ

The 2023–24 Charlotte Hornets season was the 34th season for the franchise in the National Basketball Association (NBA). This also became the first season where Michael Jordan would not be the majority owner of the team, with Gabe Plotkin and Rick Schnall being the new majority owners of the franchise as of August 2023. The Hornets had the second overall pick in the 2023 NBA draft, which they used to select Brandon Miller.

On March 23, the Hornets were eliminated from playoff contention for the 8th consecutive season following their 132–91 loss to the Atlanta Hawks. The Hornets drew an average home attendance of 16,448 in 41 home games in the 2023-24 NBA season.

== Draft ==
Round	Pick	Player	Position(s)	Nationality	College / Club
1	2	Brandon Miller	SF/SG	United States	Alabama (Fr.)
1	27	Nick Smith Jr.	PG/SG	United States	Arkansas (Fr.)
2	39	Mouhamed Gueye	PF	Senegal	Washington State (So.)
2	41	Amari Bailey	SG	United States	UCLA (Fr.)

The Hornets entered the draft with two first-round selections and two second-round selections. Their original first-round pick landed 2nd overall following the NBA draft lottery, while the three other picks were acquired through previous trades.

== Roster ==
2023–24 Charlotte Hornets roster
Players

Pos.	No.	Player	Height	Weight	DOB	From
G	10	Amari Bailey (TW)	6 ft 5 in (1.96 m)	185 lb (84 kg)	2004-02-17	UCLA
G	1	LaMelo Ball (injured)	6 ft 7 in (2.01 m)	180 lb (82 kg)	2001-08-22	SPIRE Academy (OH)
F	9	Dāvis Bertāns	6 ft 10 in (2.08 m)	225 lb (102 kg)	1992-11-12	Latvia
F	12	Leaky Black (TW)	6 ft 9 in (2.06 m)	209 lb (95 kg)	1999-06-14	North Carolina
C	3	Marques Bolden (TW)	6 ft 10 in (2.08 m)	249 lb (113 kg)	1998-04-17	Duke
F	0	Miles Bridges	6 ft 7 in (2.01 m)	225 lb (102 kg)	1998-03-21	Michigan State
G	30	Seth Curry	6 ft 1 in (1.85 m)	185 lb (84 kg)	1990-08-23	Duke
G	23	Tre Mann	6 ft 3 in (1.91 m)	195 lb (88 kg)	2001-02-03	Florida
F	11	Cody Martin	6 ft 6 in (1.98 m)	205 lb (93 kg)	1995-09-28	Nevada
G	7	Bryce McGowens	6 ft 7 in (2.01 m)	179 lb (81 kg)	2002-11-08	Nebraska
G	22	Vasilije Micić	6 ft 3 in (1.91 m)	187 lb (85 kg)	1994-01-13	Serbia
G/F	24	Brandon Miller	6 ft 9 in (2.06 m)	200 lb (91 kg)	2002-11-22	Alabama
F/C	17	Aleksej Pokuševski	7 ft 0 in (2.13 m)	210 lb (95 kg)	2001-12-26	Serbia
C	4	Nick Richards	7 ft 0 in (2.13 m)	245 lb (111 kg)	1997-11-29	Kentucky
G	8	Nick Jr. Smith	6 ft 5 in (1.96 m)	185 lb (84 kg)	2004-04-18	Arkansas
F	21	JT Thor	6 ft 9 in (2.06 m)	203 lb (92 kg)	2002-08-26	Auburn
F	2	Grant Williams	6 ft 6 in (1.98 m)	236 lb (107 kg)	1998-11-30	Tennessee
C	5	Mark Williams (injured)	7 ft 0 in (2.13 m)	242 lb (110 kg)	2001-12-16	Duke

Coaches
Head coach
- Steve Clifford
Assistant(s)
- Bob Beyer
- Tyrone Corbin
- Nick Friedman
- Marlon Garnett
- Bruce Kreutzer
- Norman Richardson
- Rex Walters

Legend
- (DP) Unsigned draft pick
- (FA) Free agent
- (S) Suspended
- (GL) On assignment to G League affiliate
- (TW) Two-way affiliate player
- Injured

Roster
Updated: April 15, 2024

== Standings ==
=== Division ===
Southeast Division	W	L	PCT	GB	Home	Road	Div	GP
y – Orlando Magic	47	35	.573	–	29‍–‍12	18‍–‍23	9‍–‍7	82
x – Miami Heat	46	36	.561	1.0	22‍–‍19	24‍–‍17	13‍–‍3	82
pi – Atlanta Hawks	36	46	.439	11.0	21‍–‍20	15‍–‍26	8‍–‍8	82
Charlotte Hornets	21	61	.256	26.0	11‍–‍30	10‍–‍31	6‍–‍10	82
Washington Wizards	15	67	.183	32.0	7‍–‍34	8‍–‍33	4‍–‍12	82

=== Conference ===
Eastern Conference
#	Team	W	L	PCT	GB	GP
1	z – Boston Celtics *	64	18	.780	–	82
2	x – New York Knicks	50	32	.610	14.0	82
3	y – Milwaukee Bucks *	49	33	.598	15.0	82
4	x – Cleveland Cavaliers	48	34	.585	16.0	82
5	y – Orlando Magic *	47	35	.573	17.0	82
6	x – Indiana Pacers	47	35	.573	17.0	82
7	x – Philadelphia 76ers	47	35	.573	17.0	82
8	x – Miami Heat	46	36	.561	18.0	82
9	pi – Chicago Bulls	39	43	.476	25.0	82
10	pi – Atlanta Hawks	36	46	.439	28.0	82
11	Brooklyn Nets	32	50	.390	32.0	82
12	Toronto Raptors	25	57	.305	39.0	82
13	Charlotte Hornets	21	61	.256	43.0	82
14	Washington Wizards	15	67	.183	49.0	82
15	Detroit Pistons	14	68	.171	50.0	82

== Game log ==
=== Preseason ===
2023 preseason game log
Total: 1–3 (Home: 1–1; Road: 0–2)
Preseason: 1–3 (home: 1–1; road: 0–2)

Game	Date	Team	Score	High points	High rebounds	High assists	Location Attendance	Record
1	October 10	@ Miami	L 109–113	LaMelo Ball (17)	Nick Richards (10)	LaMelo Ball (7)	Kaseya Center; 19,600	0–1
2	October 12	@ Washington	L 92–98	Terry Rozier (13)	Nick Richards (12)	Terry Rozier (7)	Capital One Arena; 7,297	0–2
3	October 15	Oklahoma City	W 117–115	P. J. Washington (31)	Miller, Richards (7)	three players (6)	Spectrum Center; 10,553	1–2
4	October 19	Boston	L 99–127	LaMelo Ball (16)	JT Thor (8)	LaMelo Ball (5)	Spectrum Center; 12,590	1–3

2023–24 preseason schedule

=== Regular season ===
This became the first regular season where all the NBA teams competed in a mid-season tournament setting due to the implementation of the 2023 NBA In-Season Tournament.

2023–24 game log
Total: 21–61 (Home: 11–30; Road: 10–31)
October: 1–2 (home: 1–2; road: 0–0)

Game	Date	Team	Score	High points	High rebounds	High assists	Location Attendance	Record
1	October 25	Atlanta	W 116–110	P. J. Washington (25)	Mark Williams (15)	LaMelo Ball (10)	Spectrum Center; 16,129	1–0
2	October 27	Detroit	L 99–111	Ball, Rozier (20)	Ball, Hayward (9)	LaMelo Ball (9)	Spectrum Center; 15,855	1–1
3	October 30	Brooklyn	L 121–133	Terry Rozier (23)	P. J. Washington (12)	Terry Rozier (9)	Spectrum Center; 14,491	1–2

November: 5–9 (home: 2–4; road: 3–5)

Game	Date	Team	Score	High points	High rebounds	High assists	Location Attendance	Record
4	November 1	@ Houston	L 119–128	P. J. Washington (23)	Nick Richards (8)	Terry Rozier (6)	Toyota Center; 16,263	1–3
5	November 4	@ Indiana	W 125–124	Mark Williams (27)	Nick Richards (10)	LaMelo Ball (11)	Gainbridge Fieldhouse; 15,945	2–3
6	November 5	@ Dallas	L 118–124	LaMelo Ball (32)	Ball, M. Williams (10)	LaMelo Ball (13)	American Airlines Center; 20,052	2–4
7	November 8	Washington	L 116–132	LaMelo Ball (34)	Hayward, Washington, M. Williams (7)	LaMelo Ball (7)	Spectrum Center; 14,267	2–5
8	November 10	@ Washington	W 124–117	Gordon Hayward (27)	Mark Williams (24)	Gordon Hayward (9)	Capital One Arena; 17,602	3–5
9	November 12	@ New York	L 107–129	LaMelo Ball (32)	LaMelo Ball (7)	LaMelo Ball (6)	Madison Square Garden; 19,812	3–6
10	November 14	Miami	L 105–111	P. J. Washington (32)	Nick Richards (11)	LaMelo Ball (11)	Spectrum Center; 15,673	3–7
11	November 17	Milwaukee	L 99–130	LaMelo Ball (37)	Mark Williams (16)	LaMelo Ball (5)	Spectrum Center; 19,258	3–8
12	November 18	New York	L 108–122	LaMelo Ball (34)	Mark Williams (8)	LaMelo Ball (9)	Spectrum Center; 19,171	3–9
13	November 20	Boston	W 121–118 (OT)	LaMelo Ball (36)	Mark Williams (16)	LaMelo Ball (8)	Spectrum Center; 19,134	4–9
14	November 22	Washington	W 117–114	LaMelo Ball (34)	Mark Williams (15)	LaMelo Ball (13)	Spectrum Center; 16,432	5–9
15	November 26	@ Orlando	L 117–130	Miles Bridges (23)	Miles Bridges (10)	Terry Rozier (9)	Amway Center; 18,846	5–10
16	November 28	@ New York	L 91–115	Brandon Miller (18)	Mark Williams (12)	Gordon Hayward (6)	Madison Square Garden; 19,111	5–11
17	November 30	@ Brooklyn	W 129–128	Terry Rozier (37)	Mark Williams (12)	Terry Rozier (13)	Barclays Center; 16,072	6–11

December: 1–12 (home: 1–5; road: 0–7)

Game	Date	Team	Score	High points	High rebounds	High assists	Location Attendance	Record
18	December 2	Minnesota	L 117–123	Terry Rozier (23)	P. J. Washington (7)	Terry Rozier (7)	Spectrum Center; 17,732	6–12
19	December 6	@ Chicago	L 100–111	Gordon Hayward (27)	Nick Richards (11)	Terry Rozier (7)	United Center; 17,689	6–13
20	December 8	Toronto	W 119–116	Gordon Hayward (24)	Bridges, Richards (8)	Terry Rozier (13)	Spectrum Center; 11,526	7–13
21	December 11	Miami	L 114–116	Terry Rozier (34)	P. J. Washington (8)	Terry Rozier (13)	Spectrum Center; 15,543	7–14
22	December 13	@ Miami	L 104–115	Terry Rozier (28)	Nick Richards (10)	Hayward, Rozier (7)	Kaseya Center; 19,600	7–15
23	December 15	New Orleans	L 107–112	Terry Rozier (30)	Miles Bridges (10)	Terry Rozier (6)	Spectrum Center; 16,080	7–16
24	December 16	Philadelphia	L 82–135	Brandon Miller (14)	Miles Bridges (10)	Miller, I. Smith (4)	Spectrum Center; 17,829	7–17
25	December 18	@ Toronto	L 99–114	Terry Rozier (22)	Nick Richards (10)	Terry Rozier (7)	Scotiabank Arena; 19,288	7–18
26	December 20	@ Indiana	L 113–144	Brandon Miller (21)	Terry Rozier (9)	Terry Rozier (7)	Gainbridge Fieldhouse; 16,761	7–19
27	December 23	Denver	L 95–102	Miles Bridges (22)	Nick Richards (15)	Ish Smith (8)	Spectrum Center; 19,165	7–20
28	December 26	@ L.A. Clippers	L 104–113	Miles Bridges (21)	Miles Bridges (11)	Terry Rozier (7)	Crypto.com Arena; 19,370	7–21
29	December 28	@ L.A. Lakers	L 112–133	Miles Bridges (20)	Nick Richards (10)	Terry Rozier (8)	Crypto.com Arena; 18,997	7–22
30	December 29	@ Phoenix	L 119–133	Terry Rozier (42)	Miles Bridges (7)	Terry Rozier (8)	Footprint Center; 17,071	7–23

January : 3–13 (home: 1–7; road: 2–6)

Game	Date	Team	Score	High points	High rebounds	High assists	Location Attendance	Record
31	January 1	@ Denver	L 93–111	Miles Bridges (26)	Miles Bridges (9)	Cody Martin (6)	Ball Arena; 19,625	7–24
32	January 2	@ Sacramento	W 111–104	Terry Rozier (34)	Nick Richards (10)	Terry Rozier (6)	Golden 1 Center; 17,983	8–24
33	January 5	@ Chicago	L 91–104	Miles Bridges (28)	Nick Richards (12)	Terry Rozier (7)	United Center; 21,345	8–25
34	January 8	Chicago	L 112–119 (OT)	Terry Rozier (39)	Bridges, Richards, Thor (8)	Terry Rozier (8)	Spectrum Center; 14,418	8–26
35	January 10	Sacramento	L 98–123	Miles Bridges (24)	Nick Richards (9)	Miles Bridges (6)	Spectrum Center; 14,173	8–27
36	January 12	@ San Antonio	L 99–135	LaMelo Ball (28)	Miles Bridges (9)	Ish Smith (6)	Frost Bank Center; 18,073	8–28
37	January 14	@ Miami	L 87–104	Terry Rozier (26)	LaMelo Ball (10)	Terry Rozier (7)	Kaseya Center; 19,831	8–29
38	January 17	@ New Orleans	L 112–132	LaMelo Ball (29)	Nick Richards (12)	LaMelo Ball (7)	Smoothie King Center; 16,093	8–30
39	January 19	San Antonio	W 124–120	LaMelo Ball (28)	Brandon Miller (9)	Ball, Rozier (8)	Spectrum Center; 19,093	9–30
40	January 20	Philadelphia	L 89–97	Miles Bridges (25)	Miles Bridges (11)	Terry Rozier (6)	Spectrum Center; 18,261	9–31
41	January 22	@ Minnesota	W 128–125	Miles Bridges (28)	P. J. Washington (7)	LaMelo Ball (13)	Target Center; 18,024	10–31
42	January 24	@ Detroit	L 106–113	Brandon Miller (23)	Bridges, Richards (10)	LaMelo Ball (7)	Little Caesars Arena; 15,020	10–32
43	January 26	Houston	L 104–138	Miles Bridges (21)	Bridges, Richards (7)	LaMelo Ball (8)	Spectrum Center; 16,164	10–33
44	January 27	Utah	L 122–134	P. J. Washington (43)	Nick Richards (13)	Ish Smith (12)	Spectrum Center; 17,633	10–34
45	January 29	New York	L 92–113	Brandon Miller (29)	Miles Bridges (10)	Cody Martin (8)	Spectrum Center; 15,546	10–35
46	January 31	Chicago	L 110–117	Miles Bridges (30)	Miles Bridges (15)	Cody Martin (6)	Spectrum Center; 13,712	10–36

February: 5–8 (home: 3–4; road: 2–4)

Game	Date	Team	Score	High points	High rebounds	High assists	Location Attendance	Record
47	February 2	@ Oklahoma City	L 106–126	Brandon Miller (28)	Nick Richards (11)	Bridges, Martin, Miller (4)	Paycom Center; 17,552	10–37
48	February 4	Indiana	L 99–115	Brandon Miller (35)	Nick Richards (10)	Ish Smith (4)	Spectrum Center; 15,687	10–38
49	February 5	L.A. Lakers	L 118–124	Miles Bridges (41)	Nick Richards (9)	Ish Smith (6)	Spectrum Center; 19,375	10–39
50	February 7	Toronto	L 117–123	Miles Bridges (45)	Miles Bridges (8)	Cody Martin (8)	Spectrum Center; 11,720	10–40
51	February 9	@ Milwaukee	L 84–120	Miller, Richards (16)	Nick Richards (11)	Cody Martin (5)	Fiserv Forum; 17,690	10–41
52	February 10	Memphis	W 115–106	Miles Bridges (25)	Grant Williams (8)	Mann, Micić (9)	Spectrum Center; 17,259	11–41
53	February 12	Indiana	W 111–102	Grant Williams (21)	Miles Bridges (10)	Bridges, Mann (7)	Spectrum Center; 12,112	12–41
54	February 14	Atlanta	W 122–99	Brandon Miller (26)	Grant Williams (10)	Tre Mann (6)	Spectrum Center; 14,336	13–41
All-Star Game
55	February 22	@ Utah	W 115–107	Miles Bridges (26)	Miles Bridges (14)	Vasilije Micić (8)	Delta Center; 18,206	14–41
56	February 23	@ Golden State	L 84–97	Miles Bridges (19)	Nick Richards (13)	Brandon Miller (5)	Chase Center; 18,064	14–42
57	February 25	@ Portland	W 93–80	Nick Richards (21)	Bridges, Richards (10)	Cody Martin (10)	Moda Center; 17,888	15–42
58	February 27	@ Milwaukee	L 85–123	Miles Bridges (17)	Richards, G. Williams (7)	Cody Martin (7)	Fiserv Forum; 17,607	15–43
59	February 29	Milwaukee	L 99–111	Brandon Miller (21)	Miles Bridges (10)	Vasilije Micić (7)	Spectrum Center; 18,463	15–44

March : 3–12 (home: 2–4; road: 1–8)

Game	Date	Team	Score	High points	High rebounds	High assists	Location Attendance	Record
60	March 1	@ Philadelphia	L 114–121	Miles Bridges (27)	Miles Bridges (11)	Vasilije Micić (7)	Wells Fargo Center; 19,788	15–45
61	March 3	@ Toronto	L 106–111	Brandon Miller (26)	Grant Williams (13)	Vasilije Micić (6)	Scotiabank Arena; 19,512	15–46
62	March 5	Orlando	L 89–101	Vasilije Micić (21)	Bertāns, Mann (6)	Mann, Micić (4)	Spectrum Center; 15,928	15–47
63	March 8	@ Washington	L 100–112	Miles Bridges (32)	Nick Richards (13)	Grant Williams (5)	Capital One Arena; 18,778	15–48
64	March 9	Brooklyn	W 110–99	Miles Bridges (24)	Nick Richards (11)	Vasilije Micić (10)	Spectrum Center; 19,090	16–48
65	March 11	@ Detroit	L 97–114	Miles Bridges (24)	Nick Richards (13)	Micić, Miller (7)	Little Caesars Arena; 18,003	16–49
66	March 13	@ Memphis	W 110–98	Miles Bridges (27)	Bridges, G. Williams (6)	Vasilije Micić (8)	FedExForum; 16,717	17–49
67	March 15	Phoenix	L 96–107	Vasilije Micić (21)	Nick Richards (15)	Tre Mann (7)	Spectrum Center; 18,613	17–50
68	March 16	@ Philadelphia	L 98–109	Tre Mann (21)	Nick Richards (11)	Bridges, Mann (6)	Wells Fargo Center; 19,957	17–51
69	March 19	@ Orlando	L 92–112	Brandon Miller (21)	Brandon Miller (7)	Bridges, Mann (5)	Kia Center; 18,846	17–52
70	March 23	@ Atlanta	L 91–132	Miles Bridges (27)	Nick Richards (16)	Tre Mann (9)	State Farm Arena; 17,900	17–53
71	March 25	@ Cleveland	L 92–115	Brandon Miller (24)	Brandon Miller (8)	Tre Mann (5)	Rocket Mortgage FieldHouse; 19,432	17–54
72	March 27	Cleveland	W 118–111	Brandon Miller (31)	Nick Richards (10)	Vasilije Micić (12)	Spectrum Center; 15,303	18–54
73	March 29	Golden State	L 97–115	Miles Bridges (22)	Miles Bridges (9)	Vasilije Micić (8)	Spectrum Center; 19,487	18–55
74	March 31	L.A. Clippers	L 118–130	Miles Bridges (33)	Miles Bridges (7)	Vasilije Micić (13)	Spectrum Center; 15,941	18–56

April: 3–5 (home: 1–4; road: 2–1)

Game	Date	Team	Score	High points	High rebounds	High assists	Location Attendance	Record
75	April 1	Boston	L 104–118	Miles Bridges (26)	Miles Bridges (11)	Vasilije Micić (9)	Spectrum Center; 19,238	18–57
76	April 3	Portland	L 86–89	Brandon Miller (21)	Marques Bolden (8)	Grant Williams (11)	Spectrum Center; 14,209	18–58
77	April 5	Orlando	W 124–115	Brandon Miller (32)	Bridges, Miller, G. Williams (6)	Vasilije Micić (9)	Spectrum Center; 16,374	19–58
78	April 7	Oklahoma City	L 118–121	Grant Williams (19)	Bridges, Pokuševski (9)	Vasilije Micić (10)	Spectrum Center; 16,556	19–59
79	April 9	Dallas	L 104–130	Miles Bridges (22)	Nick Richards (7)	Tre Mann (6)	Spectrum Center; 17,425	19–60
80	April 10	@ Atlanta	W 115–114	Brandon Miller (27)	Pokuševski, G. Williams (6)	Tre Mann (7)	State Farm Arena; 16,158	20–60
81	April 12	@ Boston	L 98–131	Tre Mann (19)	Bolden, Pokuševski (5)	Tre Mann (8)	TD Garden	20–61
82	April 14	@ Cleveland	W 120–110	Nick Smith Jr. (24)	JT Thor (9)	Tre Mann (6)	Rocket Mortgage FieldHouse; 19,432	21–61

2023–24 season schedule

=== In-Season Tournament ===
This was the first regular season where all the NBA teams competed in a mid-season tournament setting due to the implementation of the 2023 NBA In-Season Tournament. During the in-season tournament period, the Hornets competed in Group B of the Eastern Conference, which included the Milwaukee Bucks, New York Knicks, Miami Heat, and Washington Wizards.

==== East group B ====
Pos	Team	Pld	W	L	PF	PA	PD	Qualification	MIL	NYK	MIA	CHA	WAS
1	Milwaukee Bucks	4	4	0	502	456	+46	Advance to knockout stage	—	110–105	131–124	130–99	131–128
2	New York Knicks	4	3	1	440	398	+42	Advance to knockout stage	105–110	—	100–98	115–91	120–99
3	Miami Heat	4	2	2	454	450	+4		124–131	98–100	—	111–105	121–114
4	Charlotte Hornets	4	1	3	419	473	−54		99–130	91–115	105–111	—	124–117
5	Washington Wizards	4	0	4	458	496	−38		128–131	99–120	114–121	117–124	—

Source: NBA
Rules for classification: Tiebreakers

== Player statistics ==
=== Regular season ===
Player	POS	GP	GS	MP	REB	AST	STL	BLK	PTS	MPG	RPG	APG	SPG	BPG	PPG
Brandon Miller	SF	74	68	2,383	315	175	66	42	1,279	32.2	4.3	2.4	.9	.6	17.3
Miles Bridges	SF	69	67	2,581	505	231	65	33	1,449	37.4	7.3	3.3	.9	.5	21.0
Nick Richards	C	67	51	1,759	539	54	26	74	652	26.3	8.0	.8	.4	1.1	9.7
JT Thor	PF	63	3	781	146	29	11	27	199	12.4	2.3	.5	.2	.4	3.2
Bryce McGowens	SG	59	14	882	102	51	21	10	302	14.9	1.7	.9	.4	.2	5.1
Nick Smith Jr.	SG	51	0	729	72	59	10	7	302	14.3	1.4	1.2	.2	.1	5.9
P. J. Washington^{†}	PF	44	17	1,286	232	97	38	32	600	29.2	5.3	2.2	.9	.7	13.6
Ish Smith	PG	43	5	741	76	145	17	4	139	17.2	1.8	3.4	.4	.1	3.2
Terry Rozier^{†}	SG	30	30	1,065	117	198	32	12	696	35.5	3.9	6.6	1.1	.4	23.2
Vasilije Micić^{†}	PG	30	21	815	64	186	22	4	323	27.2	2.1	6.2	.7	.1	10.8
Grant Williams^{†}	PF	29	10	888	149	93	20	12	402	30.6	5.1	3.2	.7	.4	13.9
Tre Mann^{†}	PG	28	28	868	125	145	48	3	333	31.0	4.5	5.2	1.7	.1	11.9
Cody Martin	SF	28	22	753	109	104	32	18	211	26.9	3.9	3.7	1.1	.6	7.5
Dāvis Bertāns^{†}	PF	28	1	583	51	26	23	9	246	20.8	1.8	.9	.8	.3	8.8
Leaky Black	SF	26	3	284	48	24	8	11	69	10.9	1.8	.9	.3	.4	2.7
Gordon Hayward^{†}	SF	25	25	798	117	116	28	12	362	31.9	4.7	4.6	1.1	.5	14.5
Nathan Mensah	C	25	0	307	65	9	6	14	33	12.3	2.6	.4	.2	.6	1.3
LaMelo Ball	PG	22	22	711	113	176	40	4	526	32.3	5.1	8.0	1.8	.2	23.9
Mark Williams	C	19	19	508	184	22	16	20	242	26.7	9.7	1.2	.8	1.1	12.7
Aleksej Pokuševski^{†}	PF	18	0	345	79	30	14	12	134	19.2	4.4	1.7	.8	.7	7.4
James Bouknight	SG	14	0	81	9	6	1	1	50	5.8	.6	.4	.1	.1	3.6
Théo Maledon^{†}	PG	13	1	200	23	28	7	0	54	15.4	1.8	2.2	.5	.0	4.2
Amari Bailey	PG	10	0	65	9	7	3	0	23	6.5	.9	.7	.3	.0	2.3
Marques Bolden^{†}	C	9	2	118	32	4	3	7	37	13.1	3.6	.4	.3	.8	4.1
Seth Curry^{†}	SG	8	1	159	16	14	5	3	72	19.9	2.0	1.8	.6	.4	9.0
Frank Ntilikina	PG	5	0	43	6	4	0	0	5	8.6	1.2	.8	.0	.0	1.0

- ^{†} Denotes player spent time with another team in the season. Stats reflect time with the Hornets only.

== Transactions ==
=== Trades ===
June 23, 2023
To Charlotte Hornets

Draft rights to James Nnaji (No. 31)
To Boston Celtics

Draft rights to Colby Jones (No. 34)

Draft rights to Mouhamed Gueye (No. 39)

January 23, 2024
To Charlotte Hornets

Kyle Lowry
2027 first-round pick
To Miami Heat

Terry Rozier
February 8, 2024
To Charlotte Hornets

Seth Curry
Grant Williams
2027 first-round pick
To Dallas Mavericks

P. J. Washington
2024 second-round pick
2028 second-round pick
February 8, 2024
To Charlotte Hornets

Dāvis Bertāns
Tre Mann
Vasilije Micić
2024 second-round pick
2025 second-round pick
To Oklahoma City Thunder

Gordon Hayward

=== Free agency ===
==== Re-signed ====
Date	Player	Ref.
July 7	Miles Bridges	
August 29	P. J. Washington	
September 29	Théo Maledon	

==== Additions ====
Date	Player	Former team	Ref.
July 19	Leaky Black	North Carolina Tar Heels	
August 10	Frank Ntilikina	Dallas Mavericks	
September 5	Angelo Allegri	Eastern Washington Eagles	
September 5	Nathan Mensah	San Diego State Aztecs	
September 5	Trevon Scott	Calgary Surge	
September 5	Jaylen Sims	Greensboro Swarm	
September 29	R.J. Hunter	Sydney Kings	
September 29	Edmond Sumner	Brooklyn Nets	
October 24	Ish Smith	Denver Nuggets	

==== Subtractions ====
Date	Player	Reason left	New team	Ref.
July 8	Dennis Smith Jr.	Free agency	Brooklyn Nets	
August 3	Xavier Sneed	Waived	Happy Casa Brindisi	
August 30	Kobi Simmons	Waived	Raptors 905	
August 31	Sviatoslav Mykhailiuk	Free agency	Boston Celtics	
September 26	Kelly Oubre Jr.	Free agency	Philadelphia 76ers	
September 29	Angelo Allegri	Waived	Greensboro Swarm	
September 29	Trevon Scott	Waived	Greensboro Swarm	
September 29	Jaylen Sims	Waived	Greensboro Swarm	
October 11	Kai Jones	Waived	Philadelphia 76ers	
October 21	R.J. Hunter	Waived	Greensboro Swarm	
October 24	Edmond Sumner	Waived	Žalgiris Kaunas	
December 14	Théo Maledon	Waived	Phoenix Suns	
February 8	James Bouknight	Waived		
February 8	Frank Ntilikina	Waived		
February 8	Ish Smith	Waived		
February 11	Kyle Lowry	Waived	Philadelphia 76ers	
