= Tidjane Salaün =

French basketball player (born 2005)

No. 31 – Charlotte Hornets
- Position: Power forward / small forward
- League: NBA

Personal information
- Born: 10 August 2005 (age 21) Paris, France
- Listed height: 6 ft 10 in (2.08 m)
- Listed weight: 207 lb (94 kg)

Career information
- NBA draft: 2024: 1st round, 6th overall pick
- Drafted by: Charlotte Hornets
- Playing career: 2022–present

Career history
- 2022–2024: Cholet Basket
- 2024–present: Charlotte Hornets
- 2025–2026: →Greensboro Swarm

Career highlights
- NBA G League champion (2026); FIBA Champions League Best Young Player (2024)
- Stats at NBA.com
- Stats at Basketball Reference

Tidjane Abdoul Salaün (French: [tidʒan salœ̃]; born 10 August 2005) is a French professional basketball player for the Charlotte Hornets of the National Basketball Association (NBA). He previously played for Cholet Basket of the LNB Pro A.

== Professional career ==
=== Cholet Basket (2022–2024) ===
Salaün began playing for Cholet Basket's youth team in LNB Espoirs, the French under-21 league, in 2021. In February 2023, he was invited to take part in the NBA's Basketball Without Borders camp during the All-Star Game weekend.

In May of the same year, Salaün was named the MVP of the 2023 Trophée du Futur tournament, having averaged 17.7 points and 7.3 rebounds per game. He signed his first professional contract with Cholet's senior team on 10 July 2023.

During the 2023–24 season, Salaün featured for Cholet Basket's senior team both in the LNB Élite and the FIBA Champions League, and finished the campaign by averaging 9.6 points, 3.9 rebounds, and one steal per game.

=== Charlotte Hornets (2024–present) ===
On 25 April 2024, Salaün announced that he had declared for the 2024 NBA draft; his entry was confirmed by the NBA on 2 May.

On 26 June 2024, Salaün was selected with the sixth overall pick by the Charlotte Hornets in the 2024 NBA draft. He was picked alongside fellow Frenchmen Zaccharie Risacher (drafted by the Atlanta Hawks with the first overall pick) and Alex Sarr (drafted by the Washington Wizards with the second pick), making France the first foreign nation to have at least three native players picked in the top 10 spots of any NBA draft. He was the second youngest player from his draft class. On 3 July 2024, he signed with the Hornets. He made his summer league debut on July 13 against the New York Knicks with the Charlotte Hornets winning 94–90. He scored 8 points, grabbed 7 rebounds, and dished out an assist in 14 minutes of play. On 18 January 2025, he was assigned to the Greensboro Swarm.

== National team career ==
Salaün played for the France national under-18 team in the 2023 FIBA U18 European Championship.

== Career statistics ==
Legend
GP	Games played	GS	Games started	MPG	Minutes per game
FG%	Field goal percentage	3P%	3-point field goal percentage	FT%	Free throw percentage
RPG	Rebounds per game	APG	Assists per game	SPG	Steals per game
BPG	Blocks per game	PPG	Points per game	**Bold**	Career high

=== NBA ===
Year	Team	GP	GS	MPG	FG%	3P%	FT%	RPG	APG	SPG	BPG	PPG
2024–25	Charlotte	**60**	**10**	**20.7**	.330	.283	**.713**	**4.7**	**1.2**	**.5**	**.2**	5.9
2025–26	Charlotte	37	0	15.5	**.503**	**.434**	.650	4.0	.7	.4	**.2**	**6.0**
Career		97	10	18.8	.385	.326	.694	4.4	1.0	.5	.2	5.9

== Personal life ==
Salaün's parents both played basketball. His sister, Janelle Salaün, played in the EuroLeague Women and for the France women's national team. She now plays for the Golden State Valkyries WNBA team. He is of Guadeloupean descent.
