= Tre Mann =

American basketball player (born 2001)

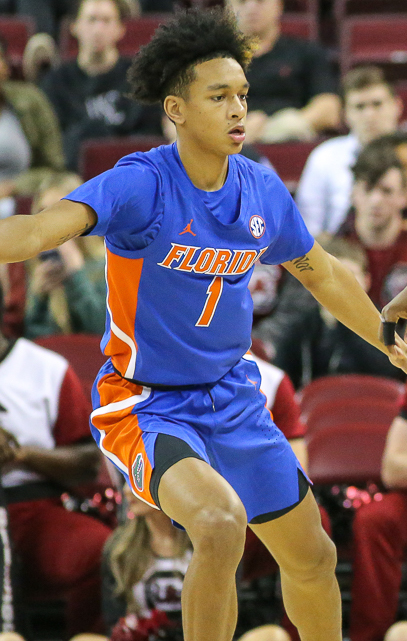
- Mann with Florida in 2020

No. 1 – Washington Wizards
- Position: Point guard
- League: NBA

Personal information
- Born: February 3, 2001 (age 25) Gainesville, Florida, U.S.
- Listed height: 6 ft 4 in (1.93 m)
- Listed weight: 178 lb (81 kg)

Career information
- High school: The Villages (The Villages, Florida)
- College: Florida (2019–2021)
- NBA draft: 2021: 1st round, 18th overall pick
- Drafted by: Oklahoma City Thunder
- Playing career: 2021–present

Career history
- 2021–2024: Oklahoma City Thunder
- 2021–2023: →Oklahoma City Blue
- 2024–2026: Charlotte Hornets
- 2026–present: Washington Wizards

Career highlights
- First-team All-SEC – Coaches (2021); Second-team All-SEC – AP (2021); McDonald's All-American (2019)
- Stats at NBA.com
- Stats at Basketball Reference

Tre'shaun Albert Mann (born February 3, 2001) is an American professional basketball player for the Washington Wizards of the National Basketball Association (NBA). He played college basketball for the Florida Gators. Mann was selected with the 18th overall pick in the 2021 NBA draft by the Oklahoma City Thunder. He played nearly three seasons for Oklahoma City before he was traded to the Hornets in a deal for Gordon Hayward in February 2024 before the Trade Deadline.

== Early life ==
Mann played basketball for The Villages Charter Schools in The Villages, Florida. As a junior, he averaged 20 points and 5.6 rebounds per game, and suffered a torn meniscus in his right knee at the Class 5A-District 5 title game. In his senior season, Mann averaged 23.6 points and 4.9 rebounds per game, and was named Daily Commercial All-Area Player of the Year. He was selected to play in the McDonald's All-American Game and Jordan Brand Classic.

Mann was considered a five-star recruit by 247Sports and Rivals, and a four-star recruit by ESPN. On August 28, 2018, he committed to playing college basketball for Florida over offers from Kansas, Tennessee and North Carolina.

College recruiting
Name	Hometown	School	Height	Weight	Commit date
Tre Mann; PG	Gainesville, FL	The Villages (FL)	6 ft 5 in (1.96 m)	185 lb (84 kg)	Aug 28, 2018
Tre Mann; PG	Recruit ratings: Rivals: 247Sports: ESPN: (89)				
Overall recruit ranking: Rivals: 24 247Sports: 12 ESPN: 33
Note: In many cases, Scout, Rivals, 247Sports, On3, and ESPN may conflict in their listings of height and weight.; In these cases, the average was taken. ESPN grades are on a 100-point scale.; Sources: "Florida 2019 Basketball Commitments". Rivals.; "2019 Florida Gators Recruiting Class". ESPN.; "2019 Team Ranking". Rivals.

== College career ==
In his first game in a Florida uniform, Mann had 11 points and four rebounds as the Gators defeated North Florida 74–59. He averaged 5.3 points per game as a freshman. Following the season he declared for the 2020 NBA draft. On July 7, 2020, Mann announced he was returning to Florida, in part due to the possibility to start at point guard.

In his sophomore season debut on December 2, 2020, Mann scored 19 points in a 76–69 win against Army. On March 12, 2021, he scored a career-high 30 points in a 78–66 loss to Tennessee at the SEC tournament quarterfinals. As a sophomore, Mann averaged 16 points, 5.6 rebounds, 3.5 assists and 1.4 steals per game, and was named First Team All-Southeastern Conference (SEC) by the league's coaches and Second Team All-SEC by the media. On March 24, he declared for the 2021 NBA draft, forgoing his remaining college eligibility.

== Professional career ==
=== Oklahoma City Thunder (2021–2024) ===
Mann was selected with the 18th pick in the 2021 NBA draft by the Oklahoma City Thunder. and on August 8, 2021, he signed a contract with the Thunder.

On April 9, 2023, Mann recorded his first career triple-double when he finished with 24 points, 12 rebounds and 12 assists in a win against the Memphis Grizzlies.

=== Charlotte Hornets (2024–2026) ===
On February 8, 2024, Mann was traded to the Charlotte Hornets, along with Dāvis Bertāns, Vasilije Micić, a 2024 second-round pick, a 2025 second-round pick and cash considerations, in exchange for Gordon Hayward. On July 13, 2025, Mann re-signed with the Hornets on a three-year, $24 million contract.

=== Washington Wizards (2026–present) ===
On August 20, 2026, Mann was traded to the Washington Wizards in a five-team deal.

== Career statistics ==
Legend
GP	Games played	GS	Games started	MPG	Minutes per game
FG%	Field goal percentage	3P%	3-point field goal percentage	FT%	Free throw percentage
RPG	Rebounds per game	APG	Assists per game	SPG	Steals per game
BPG	Blocks per game	PPG	Points per game	**Bold**	Career high

=== NBA ===
Year	Team	GP	GS	MPG	FG%	3P%	FT%	RPG	APG	SPG	BPG	PPG
2021–22	Oklahoma City	60	26	22.8	.393	.360	.793	2.9	1.5	.8	.2	10.4
2022–23	Oklahoma City	**67**	5	17.7	.393	.315	.764	2.3	1.8	.6	.2	7.7
2023–24	Oklahoma City	13	0	9.2	**.500**	**.421**	**1.000**	1.8	1.5	.2	.0	3.8
2023–24	Charlotte	28	**28**	**31.0**	.453	.364	.759	**4.5**	**5.2**	**1.7**	.1	11.9
2024–25	Charlotte	13	0	24.5	.435	.400	.905	2.9	3.0	.5	**.3**	**14.1**
2025–26	Charlotte	53	1	12.6	.360	.323	.852	1.7	1.6	.5	.1	5.5
Career		234	60	19.3	.402	.345	.795	2.6	2.1	.7	.1	8.5

=== College ===
Year	Team	GP	GS	MPG	FG%	3P%	FT%	RPG	APG	SPG	BPG	PPG
2019–20	Florida	**29**	4	17.8	.356	.275	.655	1.9	.7	.6	**.1**	5.3
2020–21	Florida	24	**24**	**32.4**	**.459**	**.402**	**.831**	**5.6**	**3.5**	**1.4**	**.1**	**16.0**
Career		53	28	24.4	.422	.349	.788	3.6	1.9	.9	.1	10.2
