= NABC Freshman of the Year =

- Awarded for: the most outstanding freshman male college basketball player
- Country: United States
- Presented by: NABC; Adidas

History
- First award: 2017
- Most recent: Cameron Boozer, Duke
- Website: Official website

The NABC Freshman of the Year is an annual college basketball award presented by the National Association of Basketball Coaches (NABC) and sponsored by Adidas to the most outstanding freshman player in the United States. The award was first given following the 2016–17 season.

== Key ==
*	Awarded a national player of the year award that same season: Sporting News; Oscar Robertson Trophy; Associated Press; NABC; Naismith; Wooden

== Winners ==
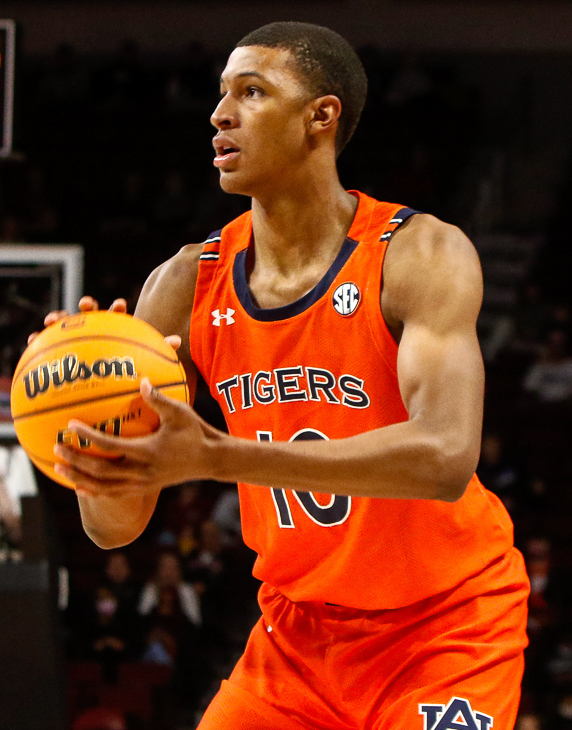
Jabari Smith Jr., Auburn, 2022

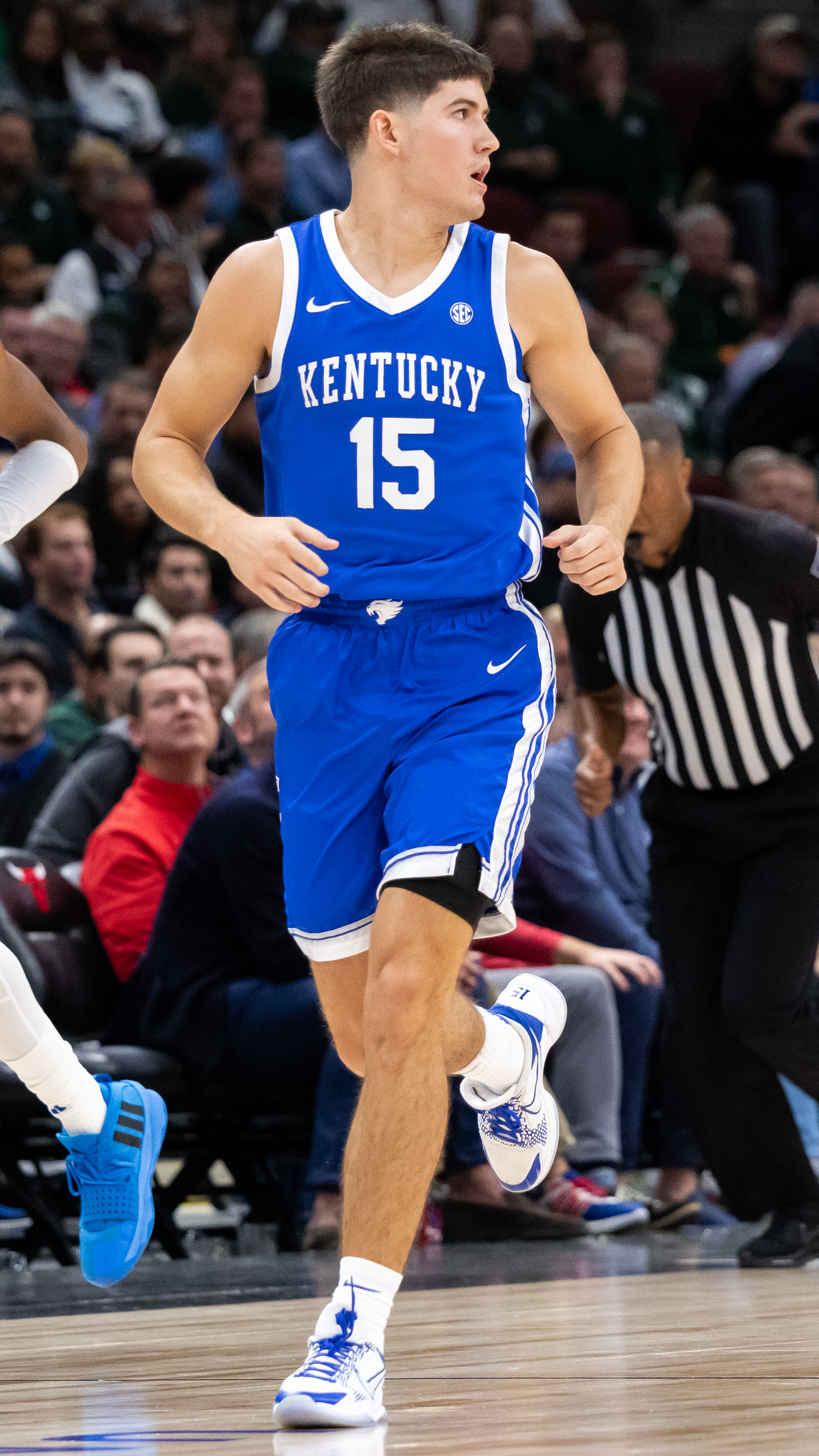
Reed Sheppard, Kentucky, 2024

Season	Player	School	Position	Reference
2016–17	Lonzo Ball	UCLA	PG	
2017–18	Marvin Bagley III	Duke	C	
2018–19	Zion Williamson*	Duke	PF	
2019–20	Vernon Carey Jr.	Duke	PF / C	
2020–21	Cade Cunningham	Oklahoma State	PG	
2021–22	Jabari Smith Jr.	Auburn	PF	
2022–23	Brandon Miller	Alabama	SF	
2023–24	Reed Sheppard	Kentucky	PG / SG	
2024–25	Cooper Flagg*	Duke	SG / SF	
2025–26	Cameron Boozer*	Duke	PF	
