= 2024–25 Charlotte Hornets season =

2024–25 NBA season by team

- Head coach: Charles Lee
- President: Fred Whitfield
- General manager: Jeff Peterson
- Owner(s): Gabe Plotkin & Rick Schnall
- Arena: Spectrum Center

Results
- Record: 19–63 (.232)
- Place: Division: 4th (Southeast); Conference: 14th (Eastern)
- Playoff finish: Did not qualify
- Stats at Basketball Reference

Local media
- Television: FanDuel Sports Network South · FanDuel Sports Network Southeast · Various networks (5 simulcasts) (Note: Includes the Capitol Broadcasting Company's WRAZ-DT2, Cox Media Group's WSOC-TV and WAXN-TV, and Gray Media's WIS-TV, WCSC-TV, WMBF-TV, WHNS, WITN-DT2 and WECT-DT2.)
- Radio: WFNZ

The 2024–25 Charlotte Hornets season was the 35th season for the franchise in the National Basketball Association (NBA). This also became the second season where Gabe Plotkin and Rick Schnall would take on majority ownership of the Hornets franchise after buying majority shares from Michael Jordan during the month of August 2023. On April 3, 2024, the Hornets announced that Steve Clifford would step down as head coach at the end of the 2023–24 season and move into a front-office advisory role. On May 9, 2024, the Hornets hired Charles Lee as their new head coach.

On March 23, 2025, the Hornets were eliminated from playoff contention for the 9th season in a row following a 122–105 loss to the Miami Heat. They were not able to improve on their 21–61 record from the previous season as they finished this season with a 19–63 record, the second-worst in the Eastern Conference.

== Draft ==
Round	Pick	Player	Position(s)	Nationality	College / club
1	6	Tidjane Salaün	PF	France	Cholet Basket
2	42	KJ Simpson	PG	United States	Colorado

The Hornets entered the draft (which was two days instead of one like it had been since the NBA draft was shortened down to two rounds back in 1989) with one first-round pick and one second-round pick, the latter of which was originally owned by the Houston Rockets and acquired from the Oklahoma City Thunder in February 2024. They had traded their original second-round pick to the New Orleans Pelicans in 2020; through subsequent trades, the pick landed with the Portland Trail Blazers as the more favorable selection than that of the Minnesota Timberwolves because the Hornets finished with a worse record in the 2023–24 season.

On the first night of the draft, the Hornets would select the French power forward Tidjane Salaün from the Cholet Basket in the recently rebranded LNB Élite as the 6th pick. Then, on the second day of the draft, the Hornets would select point guard KJ Simpson from the University of Colorado.

== Roster ==
2024–25 Charlotte Hornets roster
Players

Pos.	No.	Player	Height	Weight	DOB	From
G	1	LaMelo Ball (injured)	6 ft 7 in (2.01 m)	180 lb (82 kg)	2001-08-22	SPIRE Academy (OH)
G	7	Damion Baugh (TW)	6 ft 4 in (1.93 m)	194 lb (88 kg)	2000-08-03	TCU
F	0	Miles Bridges	6 ft 7 in (2.01 m)	225 lb (102 kg)	1998-03-21	Michigan State
G	30	Seth Curry	6 ft 1 in (1.85 m)	185 lb (84 kg)	1990-08-23	Duke
C	14	Moussa Diabaté	6 ft 9 in (2.06 m)	210 lb (95 kg)	2002-01-21	Michigan
F/C	67	Taj Gibson	6 ft 9 in (2.06 m)	232 lb (105 kg)	1985-06-24	USC
G/F	10	Josh Green	6 ft 5 in (1.96 m)	200 lb (91 kg)	2000-11-16	Arizona
G/F	3	DaQuan Jeffries	6 ft 5 in (1.96 m)	222 lb (101 kg)	1997-08-30	Tulsa
G	23	Tre Mann (injured)	6 ft 3 in (1.91 m)	178 lb (81 kg)	2001-02-03	Florida
G/F	24	Brandon Miller (injured)	6 ft 7 in (2.01 m)	200 lb (91 kg)	2002-11-22	Alabama
G	9	Wendell Moore Jr. (TW)	6 ft 5 in (1.96 m)	215 lb (98 kg)	2001-09-18	Duke
C	11	Jusuf Nurkić	7 ft 0 in (2.13 m)	290 lb (132 kg)	1994-08-23	Bosnia and Herzegovina
G/F	12	Josh Okogie	6 ft 4 in (1.93 m)	213 lb (97 kg)	1998-09-01	Georgia Tech
F	31	Tidjane Salaün	6 ft 8 in (2.03 m)	207 lb (94 kg)	2005-08-10	France
G	25	KJ Simpson (TW)	6 ft 0 in (1.83 m)	189 lb (86 kg)	2002-08-08	Colorado
G	8	Nick Smith Jr.	6 ft 2 in (1.88 m)	185 lb (84 kg)	2004-04-18	Arkansas
F	2	Grant Williams (injured)	6 ft 6 in (1.98 m)	236 lb (107 kg)	1998-11-30	Tennessee
C	5	Mark Williams	7 ft 0 in (2.13 m)	240 lb (109 kg)	2001-12-16	Duke

Coaches
Head coach
- Charles Lee
Assistant(s)
- Jermaine Bucknor
- Ryan Frazier
- Matt Hill
- Chris Jent
- Josh Longstaff
- Blaine Mueller
- Zach Peterson
- Lamar Skeeter

Legend
- (DP) Unsigned draft pick
- (FA) Free agent
- (S) Suspended
- (GL) On assignment to G League affiliate
- (TW) Two-way affiliate player
- Injured

Roster
Updated: February 28, 2025

== Standings ==
=== Division ===
Southeast Division	W	L	PCT	GB	Home	Road	Div	GP
y – Orlando Magic	41	41	.500	–	22‍–‍19	19‍–‍22	12‍–‍4	82
pi – Atlanta Hawks	40	42	.488	1.0	21‍–‍19	19‍–‍23	10‍–‍6	82
x – Miami Heat	37	45	.451	4.0	19‍–‍22	18‍–‍23	10‍–‍6	82
Charlotte Hornets	19	63	.232	22.0	12‍–‍29	7‍–‍34	1‍–‍15	82
Washington Wizards	18	64	.220	23.0	8‍–‍33	10‍–‍31	7‍–‍9	82

=== Conference ===
Eastern Conference
#	Team	W	L	PCT	GB	GP
1	c – Cleveland Cavaliers *	64	18	.780	–	82
2	y – Boston Celtics *	61	21	.744	3.0	82
3	x – New York Knicks	51	31	.622	13.0	82
4	x – Indiana Pacers	50	32	.610	14.0	82
5	x – Milwaukee Bucks	48	34	.585	16.0	82
6	x – Detroit Pistons	44	38	.537	20.0	82
7	y – Orlando Magic *	41	41	.500	23.0	82
8	pi – Atlanta Hawks	40	42	.488	24.0	82
9	pi – Chicago Bulls	39	43	.476	25.0	82
10	x – Miami Heat	37	45	.451	27.0	82
11	Toronto Raptors	30	52	.366	34.0	82
12	Brooklyn Nets	26	56	.317	38.0	82
13	Philadelphia 76ers	24	58	.293	40.0	82
14	Charlotte Hornets	19	63	.232	45.0	82
15	Washington Wizards	18	64	.220	46.0	82

== Game log ==
=== Preseason ===
During the preseason, the Hornets would play their final games under what was previously named Bally Sports South and Bally Sports Southeast. Bally Sports would rebrand itself to the FanDuel Sports Network before the start of the regular season.

2024 preseason game log
Total: 2–3 (Home: 1–1; Road: 1–2)
Preseason: 2–3 (home: 1–1; road: 1–2)

Game	Date	Team	Score	High points	High rebounds	High assists	Location Attendance	Record
1	October 6	New York	L 109–111	LaMelo Ball (18)	Nick Richards (9)	LaMelo Ball (7)	Spectrum Center; 10,486	0–1
2	October 8	Miami	W 111–108	LaMelo Ball (24)	Moussa Diabaté (10)	Ball, Mann (4)	Spectrum Center; 10,093	1–1
3	October 10	@ Memphis	W 119–94	Brandon Miller (22)	Nick Richards (11)	Vasilije Micić (4)	FedExForum; 13,411	2–1
4	October 15	@ New York	L 105–111	Brandon Miller (26)	Tidjane Salaün (8)	LaMelo Ball (7)	Madison Square Garden; 19,355	2–2
5	October 17	@ Indiana	L 116–121 (OT)	Brandon Miller (20)	Tidjane Salaün (14)	KJ Simpson (5)	Gainbridge Fieldhouse; 11,835	2–3

2024–25 preseason schedule

=== Regular season ===
2024–25 game log
Total: 19–63 (Home: 12–29; Road: 7–34)
October: 2–2 (home: 1–1; road: 1–1)

Game	Date	Team	Score	High points	High rebounds	High assists	Location Attendance	Record
1	October 23	@ Houston	W 110–105	LaMelo Ball (34)	Miles Bridges (9)	LaMelo Ball (11)	Toyota Center; 18,055	1–0
2	October 25	@ Atlanta	L 120–125	LaMelo Ball (34)	Nick Richards (13)	Grant Williams (6)	State Farm Arena; 14,433	1–1
3	October 26	Miami	L 106–114	LaMelo Ball (27)	Nick Richards (12)	LaMelo Ball (7)	Spectrum Center; 19,102	1–2
4	October 30	Toronto	W 138–133	Tre Mann (27)	Nick Richards (14)	LaMelo Ball (6)	Spectrum Center; 13,113	2–2

November: 4–12 (home: 4–6; road: 0–6)

Game	Date	Team	Score	High points	High rebounds	High assists	Location Attendance	Record
5	November 1	Boston	L 109–124	LaMelo Ball (31)	Bridges, Diabaté, G. Williams (7)	Tre Mann (5)	Spectrum Center; 18,557	2–3
6	November 2	Boston	L 103–113	LaMelo Ball (36)	Miles Bridges (8)	Ball, Miller (6)	Spectrum Center; 19,253	2–4
7	November 4	@ Minnesota	L 93–114	LaMelo Ball (19)	Miles Bridges (6)	Tre Mann (6)	Target Center; 18,978	2–5
8	November 6	Detroit	W 108–107	Miles Bridges (27)	Bridges, G. Williams (7)	LaMelo Ball (8)	Spectrum Center; 13,247	3–5
9	November 8	Indiana	W 103–83	LaMelo Ball (31)	Moussa Diabaté (15)	Ball, Miller (6)	Spectrum Center; 17,024	4–5
10	November 10	@ Philadelphia	L 105–107 (OT)	LaMelo Ball (38)	Moussa Diabaté (11)	LaMello Ball (8)	Wells Fargo Center; 19,764	4–6
11	November 12	@ Orlando	L 89–114	LaMelo Ball (35)	Moussa Diabaté (15)	Ball, Miller (7)	Kia Center; 17,541	4–7
12	November 16	Milwaukee	W 115–114	LaMelo Ball (26)	Moussa Diabaté (14)	LaMelo Ball (6)	Spectrum Center; 19,145	5–7
13	November 17	@ Cleveland	L 114–128	LaMelo Ball (31)	Grant Williams (9)	LaMelo Ball (12)	Rocket Mortgage FieldHouse; 19,432	5–8
14	November 19	@ Brooklyn	L 115–116	Brandon Miller (29)	Tidjane Salaün (8)	Tre Mann (6)	Barclays Center; 18,117	5–9
15	November 21	Detroit	W 123–121	Brandon Miller (38)	Moussa Diabaté (16)	LaMelo Ball (9)	Spectrum Center; 14,671	6–9
16	November 23	@ Milwaukee	L 119–125	LaMelo Ball (50)	Diabaté, Miller (11)	LaMelo Ball (10)	Fiserv Forum; 17,341	6–10
17	November 25	Orlando	L 84–95	LaMelo Ball (44)	Brandon Miller (10)	LaMelo Ball (7)	Spectrum Center; 14,898	6–11
18	November 27	Miami	L 94–98	LaMelo Ball (32)	Moussa Diabaté (11)	LaMelo Ball (7)	Spectrum Center; 17,710	6–12
19	November 29	New York	L 98–99	Brandon Miller (20)	Moussa Diabaté (11)	Vasilije Micić (8)	Spectrum Center; 19,313	6–13
20	November 30	Atlanta	L 104–107	Brandon Miller (32)	Diabaté, Micić, Miller (8)	Martin, Micić (5)	Spectrum Center; 17,969	6–14

December: 1–11 (home: 0–6; road: 1–5)

Game	Date	Team	Score	High points	High rebounds	High assists	Location Attendance	Record
21	December 3	Philadelphia	L 104–110	Brandon Miller (34)	Nick Richards (14)	KJ Simpson (9)	Spectrum Center; 14,956	6–15
22	December 5	@ New York	L 101–125	Brandon Miller (26)	Nick Richards (8)	Vasilije Micić (12)	Madison Square Garden; 19,812	6–16
23	December 7	Cleveland	L 102–116	Brandon Miller (25)	Cody Martin (9)	Vasilije Micić (7)	Spectrum Center; 18,832	6–17
24	December 8	@ Indiana	W 113–109	Brandon Miller (26)	Nick Richards (14)	Vasilije Micić (9)	Gainbridge Fieldhouse; 17,274	7–17
25	December 13	@ Chicago	L 95–109	Brandon Miller (21)	Bridges, M. Williams (9)	Vasilije Micić (5)	United Center; 19,543	7–18
26	December 16	Philadelphia	L 108–121	Miles Bridges (24)	Miles Bridges (6)	LaMelo Ball (11)	Spectrum Center; 14,677	7–19
27	December 19	@ Washington	L 114–123	LaMelo Ball (34)	Bridges, M. Williams (8)	LaMelo Ball (13)	Capital One Arena; 15,256	7–20
28	December 20	@ Philadelphia	L 98–108	Vasilije Micić (20)	Tidjane Salaün (8)	Tidjane Salaün (5)	Wells Fargo Center; 20,291	7–21
29	December 23	Houston	L 101–114	Miles Bridges (24)	Mark Williams (9)	LaMelo Ball (8)	Spectrum Center; 19,134	7–22
30	December 26	@ Washington	L 110–113	LaMelo Ball (31)	Miles Bridges (14)	Brandon Miller (9)	Capital One Arena; 17,193	7–23
31	December 28	Oklahoma City	L 94–106	Miles Bridges (19)	Bridges, M. Williams (10)	Miles Bridges (6)	Spectrum Center; 19,325	7–24
32	December 30	Chicago	L 108–115 (OT)	Miles Bridges (31)	Bridges, M. Williams (12)	Miles Bridges (8)	Spectrum Center; 19,197	7–25

January: 5–8 (home: 3–4; road: 2–4)

Game	Date	Team	Score	High points	High rebounds	High assists	Location Attendance	Record
33	January 3	@ Detroit	L 94–98	Miles Bridges (20)	Bridges, M. Williams (9)	Bridges, Micić, Richards (5)	Little Caesars Arena; 18,866	7–26
34	January 5	@ Cleveland	L 105–115	Ball, Miller (24)	Salaün, M. Williams (9)	Cody Martin (5)	Rocket Mortgage FieldHouse; 19,432	7–27
35	January 7	Phoenix	W 115–104	LaMelo Ball (32)	Nick Richards (12)	LaMelo Ball (7)	Spectrum Center; 16,647	8–27
—	January 9	@ L.A. Lakers	Postponed due to the January 2025 Southern California wildfires. Makeup date February 19.					
—	January 11	@ L.A. Clippers	Postponed due to the January 2025 Southern California wildfires. Makeup date March 16.					
36	January 12	@ Phoenix	L 113–120	LaMelo Ball (25)	Mark Williams (16)	LaMelo Ball (11)	Footprint Center; 17,071	8–28
37	January 15	@ Utah	W 117–112	Mark Williams (31)	Mark Williams (13)	LaMelo Ball (9)	Delta Center; 18,175	9–28
38	January 17	@ Chicago	W 125–123	LaMelo Ball (26)	Mark Williams (19)	LaMelo Ball (9)	United Center; 20,598	10–28
39	January 20	Dallas	W 110–105	Ball, Bridges (23)	Mark Williams (13)	LaMelo Ball (9)	Spectrum Center; 19,314	11–28
40	January 22	@ Memphis	L 120–132	Mark Williams (38)	Mark Williams (9)	Ball, Bridges (6)	FedExForum; 15,971	11–29
41	January 24	Portland	L 97–102	Nick Smith Jr. (17)	Josh Okogie (10)	Nick Smith Jr. (5)	Spectrum Center; 16,228	11–30
42	January 25	New Orleans	W 123–92	LaMelo Ball (25)	Moussa Diabaté (13)	LaMelo Ball (7)	Spectrum Center; 18,461	12–30
43	January 27	L.A. Lakers	L 107–112	Miles Bridges (26)	Bridges, M. Williams (8)	Nick Smith Jr. (6)	Spectrum Center; 19,483	12–31
44	January 29	Brooklyn	L 83–104	Miles Bridges (23)	Miles Bridges (13)	Vasilije Micić (6)	Spectrum Center; 14,307	12–32
45	January 31	L.A. Clippers	L 104–112	Miles Bridges (27)	Moussa Diabaté (14)	Miles Bridges (6)	Spectrum Center; 15,342	12–33

February: 2–11 (home: 1–3; road: 1–8)

Game	Date	Team	Score	High points	High rebounds	High assists	Location Attendance	Record
46	February 1	Denver	L 104–107	Miles Bridges (24)	Mark Williams (15)	KJ Simpson (8)	Spectrum Center; 19,106	12–34
47	February 3	Washington	L 114–124	Bridges, Smith Jr. (24)	Mark Williams (14)	Miles Bridges (10)	Spectrum Center; 14,129	12–35
48	February 5	Milwaukee	L 102–112	Nick Smith Jr. (23)	Moussa Diabaté (13)	Miles Bridges (6)	Spectrum Center; 14,385	12–36
49	February 7	San Antonio	W 117–116	Miles Bridges (25)	Moussa Diabaté (15)	LaMelo Ball (10)	Spectrum Center; 19,290	13–36
50	February 9	@ Detroit	L 102–112	Miles Bridges (30)	Miles Bridges (9)	KJ Simpson (6)	Little Caesars Arena; 18,740	13–37
51	February 10	@ Brooklyn	L 89–97	Moussa Diabaté (21)	Moussa Diabaté (10)	Nick Smith Jr. (5)	Barclays Center; 16,013	13–38
52	February 12	@ Orlando	L 86–102	Miles Bridges (19)	Taj Gibson (12)	Elfrid Payton (7)	Kia Center; 18,947	13–39
All-Star Game
53	February 19	@ L.A. Lakers	W 100–97	Miles Bridges (29)	Mark Williams (9)	Jusuf Nurkić (7)	Crypto.com Arena; 18,997	14–39
54	February 20	@ Denver	L 115–129	Miles Bridges (36)	Miles Bridges (13)	Bridges, Nurkić (7)	Ball Arena; 19,870	14–40
55	February 22	@ Portland	L 88–141	Miles Bridges (17)	Jusuf Nurkić (8)	Jusuf Nurkić (5)	Moda Center; 18,501	14–41
56	February 24	@ Sacramento	L 88–130	Miles Bridges (23)	Jusuf Nurkić (9)	LaMelo Ball (9)	Golden 1 Center; 17,832	14–42
57	February 25	@ Golden State	L 92–128	KJ Simpson (16)	Mark Williams (12)	Damion Baugh (5)	Chase Center; 18,064	14–43
58	February 27	@ Dallas	L 96–103	Mark Williams (26)	Mark Williams (16)	Nick Smith Jr. (7)	American Airlines Center; 20,009	14–44

March: 5–12 (home: 3–6; road: 2–6)

Game	Date	Team	Score	High points	High rebounds	High assists	Location Attendance	Record
59	March 1	Washington	L 100–113	Mark Williams (24)	Mark Williams (12)	Miles Bridges (7)	Spectrum Center; 17,904	14–45
60	March 3	Golden State	L 101–119	Miles Bridges (35)	Mark Williams (13)	LaMelo Ball (7)	Spectrum Center; 19,223	14–46
61	March 5	Minnesota	L 110–125	LaMelo Ball (28)	LaMelo Ball (10)	LaMelo Ball (6)	Spectrum Center; 17,578	14–47
62	March 7	Cleveland	L 117–118	Miles Bridges (46)	Jusuf Nurkić (15)	LaMelo Ball (7)	Spectrum Center; 19,296	14–48
63	March 8	Brooklyn	W 105–102	Miles Bridges (26)	Moussa Diabaté (15)	Bridges, Green (5)	Spectrum Center; 18,652	15–48
64	March 10	@ Miami	W 105–102	Miles Bridges (35)	Mark Williams (10)	LaMelo Ball (10)	Kaseya Center; 19,600	16–48
65	March 12	@ Atlanta	L 110–123	Miles Bridges (31)	Mark Williams (14)	LaMelo Ball (9)	State Farm Arena; 15,901	16–49
66	March 14	@ San Antonio	W 145–134	LaMelo Ball (27)	Mark Williams (10)	LaMelo Ball (15)	Frost Bank Center; 18,510	17–49
67	March 16	@ L.A. Clippers	L 88–123	Mark Williams (18)	Mark Williams (15)	Mark Williams (7)	Intuit Dome; 17,927	17–50
68	March 18	Atlanta	L 102–134	Curry, Jeffries (19)	Damion Baugh (9)	Baugh, M. Williams (5)	Spectrum Center; 15,341	17–51
69	March 20	New York	W 115–98	LaMelo Ball (25)	Mark Williams (14)	LaMelo Ball (8)	Spectrum Center; 18,557	18–51
70	March 21	@ Oklahoma City	L 106–141	Miles Bridges (20)	Jusuf Nurkić (9)	KJ Simpson (8)	Paycom Center; 18,203	18–52
71	March 23	@ Miami	L 105–122	Nick Smith Jr. (19)	Miles Bridges (13)	LaMelo Ball (11)	Kaseya Center; 19,700	18–53
72	March 25	Orlando	L 104–111	LaMelo Ball (25)	Mark Williams (13)	LaMelo Ball (9)	Spectrum Center; 14,639	18–54
73	March 28	@ Toronto	L 97–108	Mark Williams (18)	Tidjane Salaün (14)	Miles Bridges (6)	Scotiabank Arena; 19,276	18–55
74	March 30	@ New Orleans	L 94–98	Miles Bridges (20)	Jusuf Nurkić (12)	Jusuf Nurkić (5)	Spectrum Center; 17,490	18–56
75	March 31	Utah	W 110–106	Miles Bridges (26)	Mark Williams (13)	Miles Bridges (8)	Spectrum Center; 14,410	19–56

April: 0–7 (home: 0–3; road: 0–4)

Game	Date	Team	Score	High points	High rebounds	High assists	Location Attendance	Record
76	April 2	@ Indiana	L 105–119	Miles Bridges (18)	Mark Williams (12)	Miles Bridges (5)	Gainbridge Fieldhouse; 16,042	19–57
77	April 4	Sacramento	L 102–125	Miles Bridges (22)	Moussa Diabaté (11)	Simpson, Sims (4)	Spectrum Center; 15,896	19–58
78	April 6	Chicago	L 117–131	Mark Williams (22)	Mark Williams (9)	KJ Simpson (7)	Spectrum Center; 18,499	19–59
79	April 8	Memphis	L 100–124	Miles Bridges (14)	Tidjane Salaün (9)	Bridges, Salaün, Sims (3)	Spectrum Center; 17,125	19–60
80	April 9	@ Toronto	L 96–126	Nick Smith Jr. (28)	Jusuf Nurkić (9)	Nick Smith Jr. (10)	Scotiabank Arena; 19,800	19–61
81	April 11	@ Boston	L 94–130	Seth Curry (17)	Mark Williams (12)	Jusuf Nurkić (6)	TD Garden; 19,156	19–62
82	April 13	@ Boston	L 86–93	Nurkić, Okogie (14)	Diabaté, Nurkić (9)	Damion Baugh (6)	TD Garden; 19,156	19–63

2024–25 season schedule

=== NBA Cup ===
The groups were revealed during the tournament announcement on July 12, 2024.

==== East Group A ====
Pos	Team	Pld	W	L	PF	PA	PD	Qualification
1	New York Knicks	4	4	0	455	425	+30	Advance to knockout stage
2	Orlando Magic	4	3	1	441	396	+45	Advance to knockout stage
3	Philadelphia 76ers	4	2	2	408	411	−3	
4	Brooklyn Nets	4	1	3	436	475	−39	
5	Charlotte Hornets	4	0	4	406	439	−33	

Source: NBA
Rules for classification: Tiebreakers

== Player statistics ==
=== Regular season ===
Player	POS	GP	GS	MP	REB	AST	STL	BLK	PTS	MPG	RPG	APG	SPG	BPG	PPG
Moussa Diabaté	C	71	8	1,241	438	56	46	40	403	17.5	6.2	.8	.6	.6	5.7
Seth Curry	SG	68	14	1,062	113	60	27	7	444	15.6	1.7	.9	.4	.1	6.5
Josh Green	SG	68	67	1,887	172	108	74	15	506	27.8	2.5	1.6	1.1	.2	7.4
Miles Bridges	PF	64	64	2,029	481	248	44	45	1,300	31.7	7.5	3.9	.7	.7	20.3
Nick Smith Jr.	SG	60	27	1,369	128	145	17	6	591	22.8	2.1	2.4	.3	.1	9.9
Tidjane Salaün	PF	60	10	1,244	280	74	29	14	353	20.7	4.7	1.2	.5	.2	5.9
LaMelo Ball	PG	47	47	1,505	232	346	54	13	1,184	32.0	4.9	7.4	1.1	.3	25.2
DaQuan Jeffries	SG	47	20	1,071	135	53	26	25	315	22.8	2.9	1.1	.6	.5	6.7
Mark Williams	C	44	41	1,171	447	109	32	54	671	26.6	10.2	2.5	.7	1.2	15.3
Cody Martin^{†}	SF	39	8	967	176	89	43	26	306	24.8	4.5	2.3	1.1	.7	7.8
Taj Gibson	C	37	11	409	120	21	9	18	107	11.1	3.2	.6	.2	.5	2.9
Vasilije Micić^{†}	PG	36	16	764	87	127	15	0	269	21.2	2.4	3.5	.4	.0	7.5
KJ Simpson	PG	36	15	842	109	112	34	6	282	23.4	3.0	3.1	.9	.2	7.8
Brandon Miller	SF	27	27	924	131	98	29	20	568	34.2	4.9	3.6	1.1	.7	21.0
Jusuf Nurkić^{†}	C	26	9	471	169	68	17	18	238	18.1	6.5	2.6	.7	.7	9.2
Nick Richards^{†}	C	21	9	440	158	28	7	26	187	21.0	7.5	1.3	.3	1.2	8.9
Isaiah Wong	SG	20	0	265	32	28	11	0	120	13.3	1.6	1.4	.6	.0	6.0
Grant Williams	PF	16	7	479	82	37	18	13	166	29.9	5.1	2.3	1.1	.8	10.4
Wendell Moore Jr.^{†}	SG	16	0	280	51	19	10	2	87	17.5	3.2	1.2	.6	.1	5.4
Josh Okogie^{†}	SG	15	6	274	41	19	27	8	133	18.3	2.7	1.3	1.8	.5	8.9
Damion Baugh	SG	15	2	370	50	56	15	2	109	24.7	3.3	3.7	1.0	.1	7.3
Tre Mann	PG	13	0	319	38	39	7	4	183	24.5	2.9	3.0	.5	.3	14.1
Elfrid Payton^{†}	PG	6	2	123	13	20	6	3	6	20.5	2.2	3.3	1.0	.5	1.0
Jaylen Sims	SG	6	0	112	6	12	3	1	42	18.7	1.0	2.0	.5	.2	7.0
Malachi Flynn	PG	4	0	44	7	7	3	0	16	11.0	1.8	1.8	.8	.0	4.0
Marcus Garrett	SG	4	0	79	6	13	3	2	28	19.8	1.5	3.3	.8	.5	7.0
Jared Rhoden^{†}	SG	4	0	12	4	2	1	0	4	3.0	1.0	.5	.3	.0	1.0

- ^{†} Denotes player spent time with another team in the season. Stats reflect time with the Hornets only.

== Transactions ==
=== Trades ===
July 6, 2024	To Charlotte Hornets Devonte' Graham; 2025 NOP second-round pick	To San Antonio Spurs Cash considerations
July 6, 2024	Six-team trade
July 6, 2024	To Charlotte Hornets Josh Green (from Dallas); Reggie Jackson (from Denver); 2029 DEN second-round pick (from Denver); 2030 DEN second-round pick (from Denver)	To Dallas Mavericks Klay Thompson (from Golden State); 2025 GSW second-round pick (from Golden State)
July 6, 2024	To Denver Nuggets Cash considerations (from Charlotte)	To Golden State Warriors Kyle Anderson (from Minnesota); Buddy Hield (from Philadelphia)
July 6, 2024	To Minnesota Timberwolves 2025 DEN second-round pick (from Golden State via Charlotte); 2031 second-round pick swap (from Golden State); Cash considerations (from Golden State)	To Philadelphia 76ers 2031 DAL second-round pick (from Golden State via Dallas)
October 2, 2024	Three-team trade
October 2, 2024	To Charlotte Hornets Charlie Brown Jr. (from New York); DaQuan Jeffries (from New York); Duane Washington Jr. (from New York); 2025 MIN second-round pick (from Minnesota); 2026 GSW second-round pick (from New York); 2031 NYK second-round pick(from New York); Cash considerations (from New York)	To New York Knicks Karl-Anthony Towns (from Minnesota); Draft rights to James Nnaji (2023 No. 31) (from Charlotte)
October 2, 2024	To Minnesota Timberwolves Keita Bates-Diop (from New York); Donte DiVincenzo (from New York); Julius Randle (from New York); 2025 DET first-round pick (from New York)

=== Free agency ===
==== Re-signed ====
Date	Player	Ref.
July 14	Miles Bridges	
July 15	Seth Curry	

==== Additions ====
Date	Player	Former team	Ref.
July 13	Taj Gibson	Detroit Pistons	

==== Subtractions ====
Date	Player	Reason left	New team	Ref.
July 3	Marques Bolden	Waived		
July 6	Dāvis Bertāns	Waived	(United Arab Emirates) BC Dubai	
July 6	Bryce McGowens	Waived	Portland Trail Blazers	
July 6	Aleksej Pokuševski	Waived	(Serbia) KK Partizan	
July 6	Devonte' Graham	Waived	Portland Trail Blazers	
July 23	Reggie Jackson	Waived	Philadelphia 76ers	
