= Brandon Miller (basketball, born 2002) =

American basketball player (born 2002)

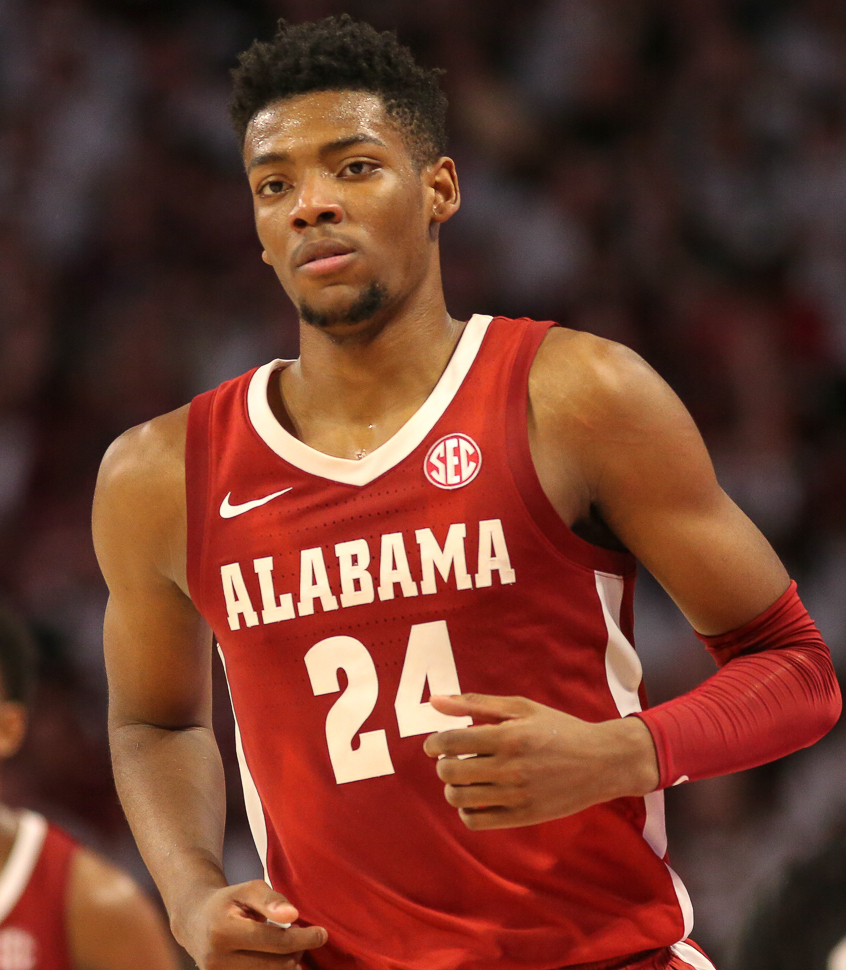
- Miller with Alabama in 2023

No. 24 – Charlotte Hornets
- Position: Small forward
- League: NBA

Personal information
- Born: November 22, 2002 (age 23) Nashville, Tennessee, U.S.
- Listed height: 6 ft 7 in (2.01 m)
- Listed weight: 200 lb (91 kg)

Career information
- High school: Cane Ridge (Antioch, Tennessee)
- College: Alabama (2022–2023)
- NBA draft: 2023: 1st round, 2nd overall pick
- Drafted by: Charlotte Hornets
- Playing career: 2023–present

Career history
- 2023–present: Charlotte Hornets

Career highlights
- NBA All-Rookie First Team (2024); Consensus second-team All-American (2023); Wayman Tisdale Award (2023); NABC Freshman of the Year (2023); SEC Player of the Year (2023); SEC Rookie of the Year (2023); First-team All-SEC (2023); SEC tournament MVP (2023); McDonald's All-American (2022); Tennessee Mr. Basketball (2022)
- Stats at NBA.com
- Stats at Basketball Reference

Brandon Jordan Miller (born November 22, 2002) is an American professional basketball player for the Charlotte Hornets of the National Basketball Association (NBA). He played college basketball for the Alabama Crimson Tide. He was a consensus five-star recruit out of high school. He was the second overall pick in the 2023 NBA draft by the Hornets.

== Early life and high school career ==
Miller was born in Nashville, Tennessee, grew up in Antioch, Tennessee, and attended Cane Ridge High School. He was named the Tennessee Gatorade Player of the Year after averaging 23.3 points, eight rebounds, 4.3 assists, 2.6 blocks, and 2.3 steals per game during his junior season. Miller repeated as the Gatorade Player of the Year and was named Tennessee Mr. Basketball as a senior after averaging 24.1 points, 8.5 rebounds, 4.3 assists, and 2.3 steals per game. He also played in the Jordan Brand Classic and the McDonald's All-American Game.

=== Recruiting ===
Miller was a consensus five-star recruit and one of the top players in the 2022 class, according to major recruiting services. His first scholarship offer was from Tennessee State who are coached by his cousin, Brian Collins. On November 1, 2021, Miller committed to playing college basketball for Alabama after considering offers from Kansas and Tennessee State. He also considered playing professionally in Australia's NBL or the G League Ignite.

College recruiting
Name	Hometown	School	Height	Weight	Commit date
Brandon Miller; SF	Antioch, TN	Cane Ridge (TN)	6 ft 8 in (2.03 m)	200 lb (91 kg)	Nov 1, 2021
Brandon Miller; SF	Recruit ratings: Rivals: 247Sports: ESPN: (92)				
Overall recruit ranking: Rivals: 17 247Sports: 14 ESPN: 9
Note: In many cases, Scout, Rivals, 247Sports, On3, and ESPN may conflict in their listings of height and weight.; In these cases, the average was taken. ESPN grades are on a 100-point scale.; Sources: "Alabama 2022 Basketball Commitments". Rivals.; "2022 Alabama Crimson Tide Recruiting Class". ESPN.; "2022 Team Ranking". Rivals.

== College career ==
Miller was named to the Naismith College Player of the Year and Julius Erving Award watch lists entering his freshman season at Alabama. On November 21, 2022, Miller earned his first Southeastern Conference (SEC) Freshman of the Week honor. On December 17, 2022, Miller scored 36 points and six rebounds against Gonzaga. He posted an Alabama freshman-record 41 points on February 22, 2023, in a 78–76 overtime win against South Carolina. Miller was named the Most Valuable Player of the 2023 SEC men's basketball tournament after averaging 20.3 points and 11 rebounds over three games. He finished the season averaging an SEC-high 18.8 points per game and also averaged 8.2 rebounds and 2.1 assists.

At the end of the regular season, Miller was named the SEC Player of the Year, the SEC Rookie of the Year, and first-team All-Conference. He was a consensus second-team All-American selection after being selected to the first teams of the Associated Press and Sporting News and the second teams of NABC and USBWA selections. Miller was also named the USBWA National Freshman of the Year and the NABC Freshman of the Year.

Miller struggled in the NCAA tournament, shooting just 19% from the field in Alabama's three games, the worst percentage by any player with 35 shot attempts in the tournament since 1985. Alabama fell in the third round of the tournament to San Diego State, with Miller going 3-of-19 from the floor. After the season Miller announced that he would forgo the remainder of his collegiate eligibility and enter the 2023 NBA draft.

== Professional career ==
The Charlotte Hornets selected Miller with the second overall pick in the 2023 NBA draft. On October 25, 2023, Miller made his NBA regular-season debut, scoring 13 points in a 116–110 win over the Atlanta Hawks. On November 18, Miller scored a then career-high 29 points in a 122–108 loss to the New York Knicks.

On January 29, 2024, Miller scored 29 points, tying his career high at the time, in a 113–92 loss to the New York Knicks. On February 4, Miller scored a then-career-high 35 points in a 115–99 loss to the Indiana Pacers. That record was upgraded to 38 points on November 21, 2024, when the team beat Detroit Pistons 123-121 in overtime.

Miller started 27 games for Charlotte during the 2024–25 NBA season, averaging 21.0 points, 4.9 rebounds, and 3.6 assists. On January 23, 2025, Miller was ruled out for the remainder of the season after undergoing surgery to repair a torn scapholunate ligament in his right wrist.

Miller made 65 starts for the Hornets during the 2025–26 season, recording averages of 20.2 points, 4.9 rebounds, and 3.3 assists. On May 6, 2026, Miller underwent surgery to address instability in his left shoulder.

== Career statistics ==
Legend
GP	Games played	GS	Games started	MPG	Minutes per game
FG%	Field goal percentage	3P%	3-point field goal percentage	FT%	Free throw percentage
RPG	Rebounds per game	APG	Assists per game	SPG	Steals per game
BPG	Blocks per game	PPG	Points per game	**Bold**	Career high

=== NBA ===
Year	Team	GP	GS	MPG	FG%	3P%	FT%	RPG	APG	SPG	BPG	PPG
2023–24	Charlotte	**74**	**68**	32.2	**.440**	.373	.827	4.3	2.4	.9	.6	17.3
2024–25	Charlotte	27	27	**34.2**	.403	.355	.861	**4.9**	**3.6**	**1.1**	**.7**	**21.0**
2025–26	Charlotte	65	65	30.3	.435	**.383**	**.892**	**4.9**	3.3	1.0	**.7**	20.2
Career		166	160	31.8	.431	.373	.863	4.6	3.0	1.0	.6	19.0

=== College ===
Year	Team	GP	GS	MPG	FG%	3P%	FT%	RPG	APG	SPG	BPG	PPG
2022–23	Alabama	37	37	32.6	.430	.384	.859	8.2	2.1	.9	.9	18.8

== Personal life ==
Miller's father, Darrell Miller, played college football as a tight end at Alabama under head coach Gene Stallings in the early 1990s. His older brother, Darrell Jr., played college basketball at Fisk University and professionally overseas. Miller's older sister, Britany, plays at Cumberland University.

Miller revealed on an episode of Paul George's podcast that his GOAT (for "Greatest Of All Time") is George and that he modeled his game after him.

=== Firearm incident ===
On February 21, 2023, a Tuscaloosa police officer testified that Miller brought a firearm to teammate Darius Miles that was used in the fatal shooting of 23-year-old Jamea Jonae Harris in Tuscaloosa earlier that year. According to Miller's attorney, Miles had left the gun in Miller's vehicle after Miller dropped Miles off at a club. As Miller was on his way back to pick up Miles, Miles texted Miller, requesting that Miller bring Miles's gun. When Miller arrived, Miles told his friend Michael Davis that the gun was in the vehicle. Davis retrieved the gun and shot into a vehicle in which Harris was a passenger, while Harris's boyfriend returned fire, resulting in two bullets striking Miller's car. Miller's attorney stated that Miller had no knowledge of any intent to use the weapon. According to the Tuscaloosa police officer's testimony, while Miles and Davis initially lied to officers about the incident, Miller's account of the shooting almost exactly matched what investigators gathered from video evidence and other witness testimony. Tuscaloosa County chief deputy district attorney Paula Whitley stated Miller would face no charges as a result of the incident.
