= Miles Bridges =

American basketball player (born 1998)

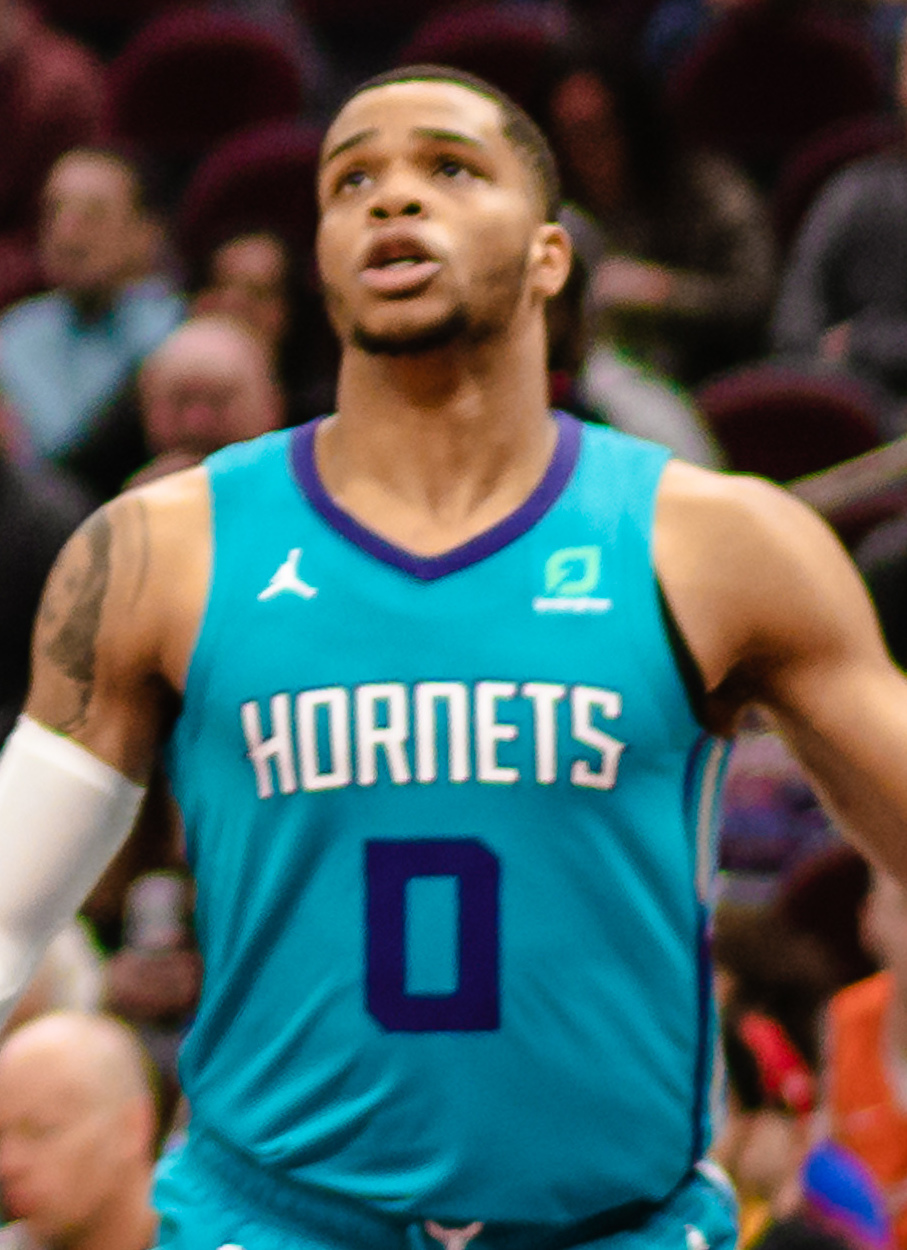
- Bridges with the Charlotte Hornets in 2019

No. 22 – Phoenix Suns
- Position: Power forward / small forward
- League: NBA

Personal information
- Born: March 21, 1998 (age 28) Flint, Michigan, U.S.
- Listed height: 6 ft 7 in (2.01 m)
- Listed weight: 225 lb (102 kg)

Career information
- High school: Flint Southwestern (Flint, Michigan) Huntington Prep (Huntington, West Virginia)
- College: Michigan State (2016–2018)
- NBA draft: 2018: 1st round, 12th overall pick
- Drafted by: Los Angeles Clippers
- Playing career: 2018–present

Career history
- 2018–2026: Charlotte Hornets
- 2026–present: Phoenix Suns

Career highlights
- Consensus second-team All-American (2018); First-team All-Big Ten (2018); Second-team All-Big Ten (2017); Big Ten Freshman of the Year (2017); McDonald's All-American (2016)
- Stats at NBA.com
- Stats at Basketball Reference

Miles Emmanuel Bridges Sr. (born March 21, 1998) is an American professional basketball player for the Phoenix Suns of the National Basketball Association (NBA). He played college basketball for the Michigan State Spartans. A native of Flint, Michigan, he competed for Flint Southwestern Academy (freshman season) at the high school level before moving to Huntington Prep School for his sophomore, junior, and senior years. Bridges was selected 12th overall by the Los Angeles Clippers in the 2018 NBA draft, but was traded to the Charlotte Hornets on draft night.

== Early life ==
Miles was born on March 21, 1998, in Flint, Michigan, to Cynthia and Raymond Bridges. His father Raymond, a two-time basketball state champion at Flint Northern High School, taught him the game at the age of two. According to Miles, his sister Tara Rushing was an important figure in his childhood. Bridges attended middle school at Woodland Park Academy in Grand Blanc, Michigan. At age 12, he practiced at a local YMCA with future high school teammates and coach Keith Gray.

== High school career ==
As a freshman, Bridges played varsity basketball with Flint Southwestern Academy in his hometown of Flint, Michigan. There, he played alongside future George Mason signee Jaire Grayer and future Mississippi Valley commit Jovan Embry. He stood 6 ft 4 in (1.93) at 14 years of age and was a center. Bridges averaged 10 points, 11 rebounds, and three blocks per game, leading his team to the regional semifinals and a 17–6 record. He was soon offered an athletic scholarship by Oakland University. In July 2013, Bridges transferred to Huntington Prep School in Huntington, West Virginia. He was encouraged to make the decision by former Flint Powers Catholic all-state guard Javontae Hawkins, who had transferred to Huntington Prep as well. Hawkins said, "Just getting away from the violence and distractions in Flint will help him grow and mature because he will be focused and away from his family." As a sophomore, he averaged 9.8 points per game, 9.9 rebounds per game, 2.7 steals, and 3.3 assists per game, while leading the Irish to a 29–5 overall record.

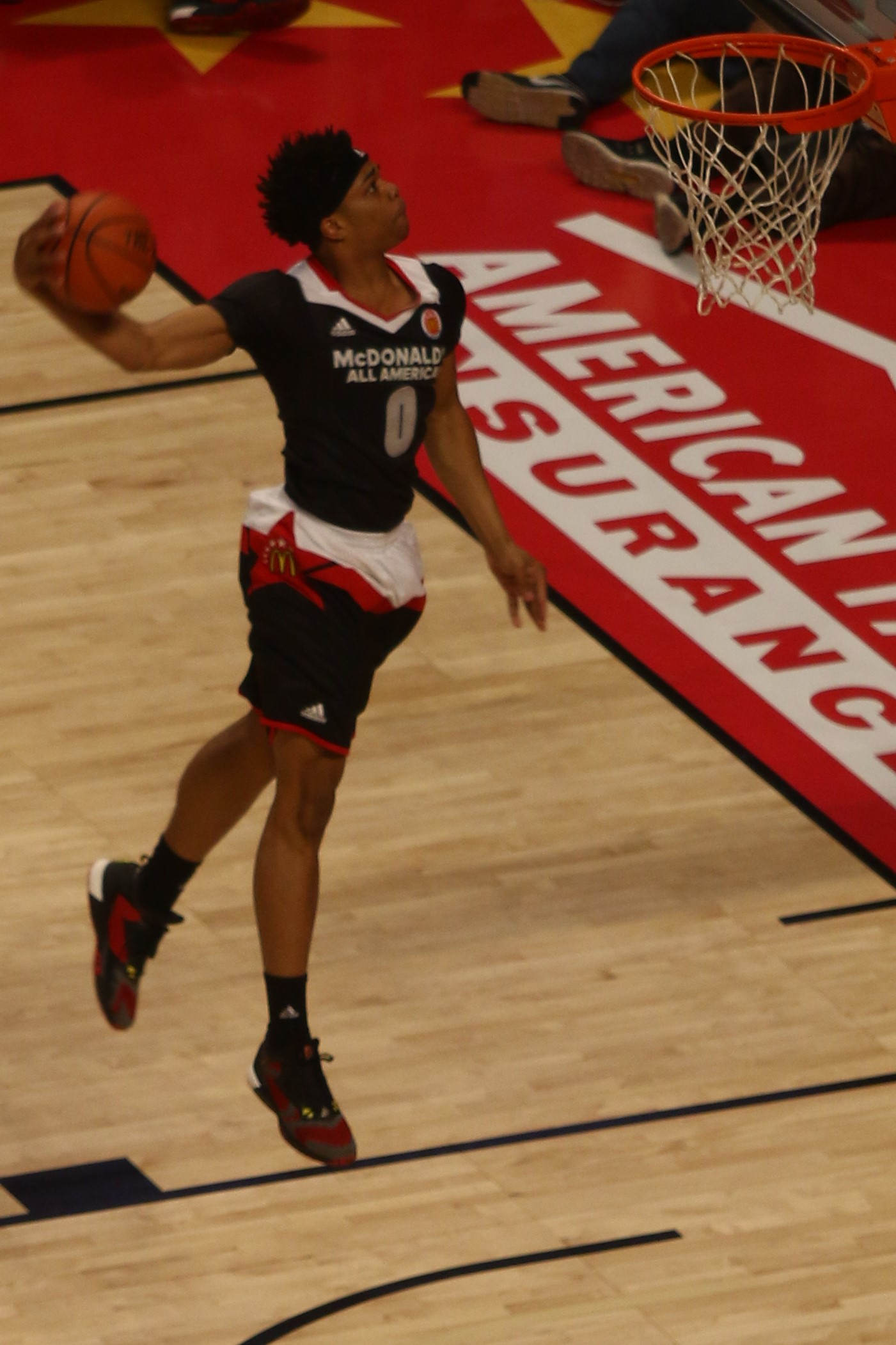
Bridges' dunk in the 2016 McDonald's All-American Game

In his junior year, Bridges and Huntington Prep played in the 2015 Dick's Sporting Goods High School Nationals Tournament at Christ the King Regional High School in Middle Village, Queens, New York. On April 2, 2015, Huntington Prep defeated Jaylen Brown and #5 ranked Wheeler 73–70 in the quarterfinals. On April 3, Bridges had 21 points, eight rebounds, and four assists in a losing effort as Huntington Prep lost to #1 ranked Oak Hill Academy 61–51 in the semi-finals. On the season, Bridges averaged 15.7 points per game, 10.6 rebounds per game, 3.5 assist per game, 2.8 blocks, and 2.3 steals per game with a 31–3 record the most in the school's history, where he played alongside senior and future NBA player Thomas Bryant.

In the 2015 summer, Bridges participated in the NBPA Top 100 Camp at the John Paul Jones Arena in Virginia. As a senior, Bridges averaged 25 points, 10 rebounds, 5.2 assists, and 2.0 steals while leading Huntington Prep to a 25–11 record. In January 2016, Bridges was named a McDonald's All-American and played in the 2016 McDonald's All-American Game, on March 30, 2016, at the United Center in Chicago, IL, where he scored eight points, three rebounds, and two steals in a 114–107 loss to the West team. He also competed in the Jordan Brand Classic All-Star game.

== College career ==
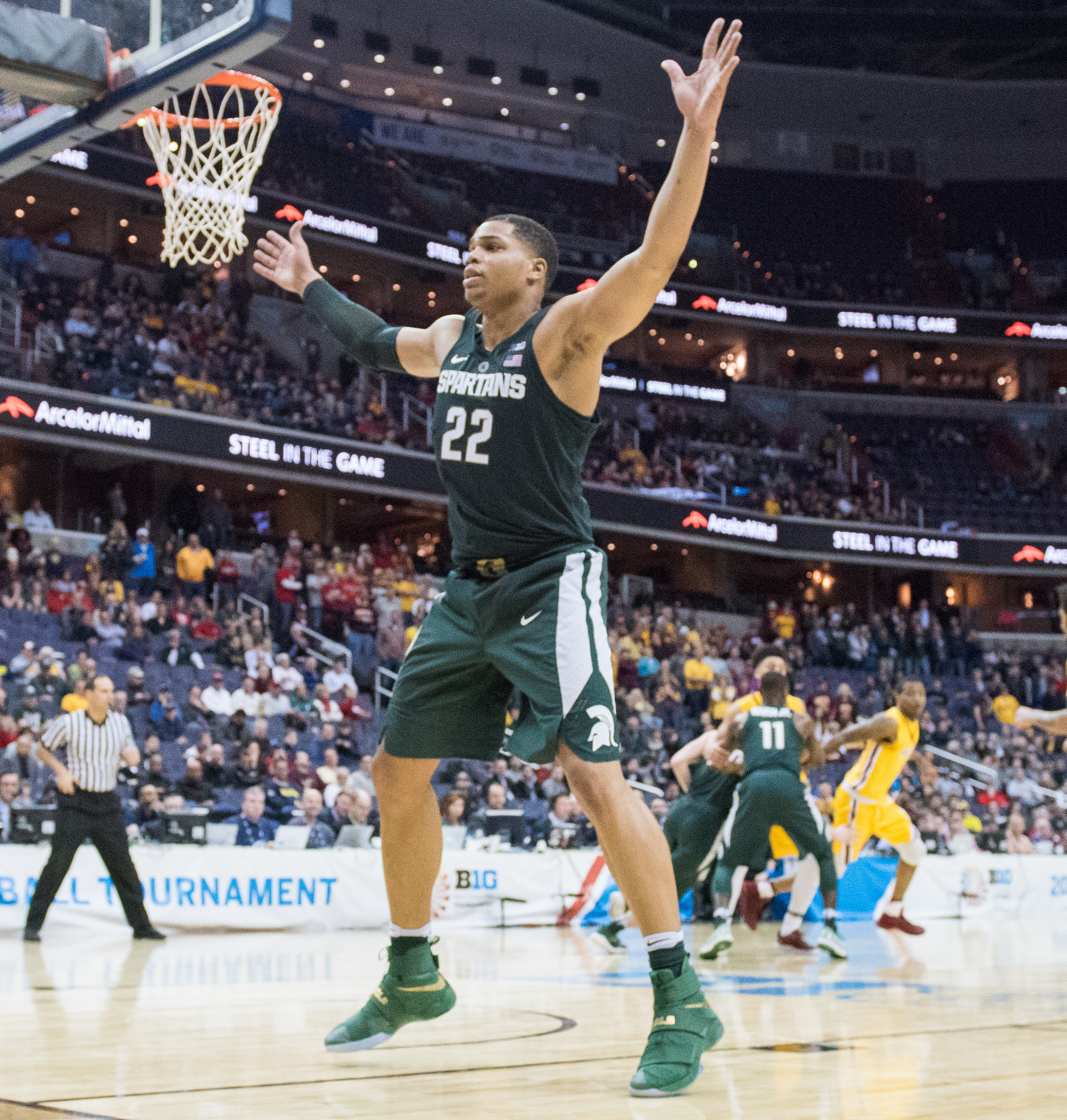
Bridges in 2017

Bridges was a five-star recruit and was ranked as the 10th-best player of his class by Rivals.com, while ESPN ranked him as the No.8 overall recruit in the 2016 high school class. He declined offers from schools such as Kentucky, Kansas, and Oregon. He announced that he would play for Michigan State on October 3, 2015. Head coach Tom Izzo labeled him a "blue-collar superstar" and expected him to easily fit into the team.

In his debut vs. Arizona on November 12, 2016, Bridges scored 21 points and recorded seven rebounds. On November 24, he scored 22 points and grabbed 15 rebounds to help defeat St. John's. On December 1, Tom Izzo announced that Miles Bridges would miss "at least a couple of weeks" due an injured ankle. Bridges returned to action on January 4, 2017, after missing seven games. He scored a career-high 33 points in a January 24 loss to Purdue.

Bridges was named Big Ten Freshman of the week five times. On February 2, 2017, Bridges was named as one of the ten finalists on the Karl Malone Power Forward of the Year watchlist.

He was named Big Ten Freshman of the year and earned second-team All-Big Ten honors. He was named to the Sporting News Freshmen All-American Team and USBWA All-District V Team. He was also named unanimous AP Big Ten Newcomer of the Year and AP All-Big Ten Second Team.

He finished the season averaging 16.9 points, 8.3 rebounds, 2.1 assists, and 1.5 blocks per game in 32 minutes per game.

On April 13, Bridges announced his intent to return to Michigan State for his sophomore season, a move prompting many experts to peg the Spartans as the 2018 National Championship favorites, especially with incoming freshman Jaren Jackson Jr. Many also believed Bridges would be the national player of the year as well as being a top 5 pick in the 2018 NBA draft.

Following third-seeded Michigan State's upset loss in the second round of the 2018 NCAA men's basketball tournament, Bridges announced his intention to forgo his final two seasons of collegiate eligibility and declare for the 2018 NBA draft.

=== Freshman season awards ===
==== Preseason awards and watchlists ====
- Sporting News #2 player in Big Ten
- Sporting News Preseason Big Ten First Team
- Sporting News Preseason All American 2nd Team
- MLive Preseason Big Ten 2nd Team
- Karl Malone Award Watch List Preseason
- Athalon Sports 15 Impact Freshmen in College Basketball for 2016–17
- Naismith Preseason Top 50
- Wendy's Wooden Award Preseason List
- Bleacher Report Most Under Pressure NCAA Player
- College Sports Madness 2016–2017 Preseason Big Ten All-Conference 4th Team
- College Sports Madness 2016–2017 Preseason Big Ten Freshman of the Year

==== Regular season awards ====
- Big Ten Freshman of the Week
- CBS Sports Big Ten Freshman of the Week
- CBS Sports Big Ten Freshman of the Week
- Battle For Atlantis All-Tournament Team
- Big Ten Freshman of the Week
- Wayman Tisdale National Freshman of the Week
- Big Ten Freshman of the Week
- CBS Top 10 Freshmen in the Nation
- Final 10 for Malone Award
- Bleacher Report- 11th best Freshman in the Nation
- Headline of the 5th Best Freshmen Class
- Big Ten Freshman of the Week

==== End of the year awards ====
- CBS Big Ten Freshman of the Year
- Big Ten Coaches Freshman of the Year
- All-Big Ten Second Team Media
- All-Big Ten Second Team Coaches
- Big Ten Freshman of the Year Media
- Sporting News Freshman All-American First Team
- Big Ten Network All-Big Ten Second Team
- Big Ten Network Big Ten Freshman of the Year
- Fox Sports National Freshman of the Year Finalist (5th place)
- USBWA All-District Team
- Karl Malone Award Finalist
- AP Big Ten Newcomer of the Year
- AP All-Big Ten Second Team
- 2017–2018 First Team All-Big Ten Coaches selection

==== Team awards ====
- Most Valuable Player Award (Team Vote)
- Most Valuable Player Award (Media Vote)
- Jumping Johnny Green Chairman of the Boards Award

== Professional career ==
=== Charlotte Hornets (2018–2026) ===
On June 21, 2018, Bridges was selected with the twelfth overall pick by the Los Angeles Clippers in the 2018 NBA draft. He was subsequently traded to the Charlotte Hornets in exchange for the pick before him, Shai Gilgeous-Alexander. On July 2, Bridges officially signed a four-year contract with the Hornets worth $16.3 million. Bridges participated in the 2019 Slam Dunk Contest.

Bridges won the Rising Stars Challenge MVP award for Team USA in Chicago on February 14, 2020, and Team USA won against Team World 151–131.

On November 20, 2021, Bridges scored a career-high 35 points, along with 10 rebounds, in a 115–105 loss to the Atlanta Hawks. On April 13, 2022, during the Hornets' 103–132 play-in tournament loss to the Atlanta Hawks, Bridges was ejected and threw his mouthpiece at a 16-year-old Hawks fan. The next day, he was fined $50,000 by the NBA for the incident.

In the 2022–23 offseason, the Hornets extended Bridges a qualifying offer.

On April 14, 2023, Bridges was suspended from the NBA for 30 games without pay due to a domestic violence incident involving his then-girlfriend Mychelle Johnson and two of their children. Though the charges occurred in mid-July and early November, the NBA opened their own investigation.

On July 7, 2023, Bridges signed a qualifying offer from the Charlotte Hornets.

On November 17, Bridges returned from his suspension and put up 17 points and five rebounds in a 130–99 loss to the Milwaukee Bucks. On November 20, Bridges put up 14 points, 15 rebounds, five assists, one steal, and a game-winning three-pointer in a 121–118 overtime win over the Boston Celtics. On February 5, 2024, Bridges scored a then career-high 41 points in a 124–118 loss to the Los Angeles Lakers. Two days later, he scored a then career-high with 45 points to go alongside 8 rebounds and 7 assists in a 123–117 loss to the Toronto Raptors.

On July 14, 2024, Bridges re-signed with the Hornets to a three-year, $75 million contract.

On March 7, 2025, Bridges scored a career-high 46 points in a 118–117 loss to the Cleveland Cavaliers.

=== Phoenix Suns (2026–present) ===
On July 13, 2026, Bridges was traded to the Phoenix Suns, alongside a 2029 first-round pick and a 2027 second-round pick, in exchange for shooting guard Grayson Allen, forward Royce O'Neale and a 2033 first-round pick. On October 21, Bridges made his Suns debut, recording eight points and four rebounds in a 124–83 loss to the Portland Trail Blazers.

== Career statistics ==
Legend
GP	Games played	GS	Games started	MPG	Minutes per game
FG%	Field goal percentage	3P%	3-point field goal percentage	FT%	Free throw percentage
RPG	Rebounds per game	APG	Assists per game	SPG	Steals per game
BPG	Blocks per game	PPG	Points per game	**Bold**	Career high

=== NBA ===
Year	Team	GP	GS	MPG	FG%	3P%	FT%	RPG	APG	SPG	BPG	PPG
2018–19	Charlotte	**80**	25	21.2	.464	.325	.753	4.0	1.2	.7	.6	7.5
2019–20	Charlotte	65	64	30.7	.424	.330	.809	5.6	1.8	.6	.7	13.0
2020–21	Charlotte	66	19	29.3	**.503**	**.400**	.867	6.0	2.2	.7	**.8**	12.7
2021–22	Charlotte	**80**	**80**	35.5	.491	.331	.802	7.0	3.8	**.9**	**.8**	20.2
2023–24	Charlotte	69	67	**37.4**	.462	.349	.825	7.3	3.3	**.9**	.5	**21.0**
2024–25	Charlotte	64	64	31.7	.431	.313	**.870**	**7.5**	**3.9**	.7	.7	20.3
2025–26	Charlotte	77	77	31.0	.460	.333	.822	5.8	3.2	.6	.4	17.1
Career		501	396	30.9	.461	.338	.825	6.1	2.8	.7	.7	15.9

=== College ===
Year	Team	GP	GS	MPG	FG%	3P%	FT%	RPG	APG	SPG	BPG	PPG
2016–17	Michigan State	28	27	**32.0**	**.486**	**.389**	.685	**8.3**	2.1	**.7**	**1.5**	16.9
2017–18	Michigan State	**34**	**33**	31.4	.457	.364	**.853**	7.0	**2.7**	.6	.8	**17.1**
Career		62	60	31.6	.470	.375	.776	7.6	2.4	.6	1.1	17.0

== Discography ==
=== Mixtapes ===
Title	Mixtape details
Up the Score	Released: December 31, 2020; Label: RTB Entertainment; Format: Digital download, streaming
Halftime	Released: November 27, 2021; Label: RTB Entertainment; Format: Digital download, streaming

=== Extended plays ===
Title	EP details
MB Vandross	Released: February 20, 2022; Label: RTB Entertainment; Format: Digital download, streaming

== Personal life ==
Miles has four children with his ex-wife Mychelle Johnson.

Outside of basketball, Bridges also makes rap music under the name RTB MB.

Bridges is naturally right handed, however he plays basketball left handed due to breaking his right arm when he was six years old, which caused him to switch to shooting with his left hand.

=== Domestic violence charges ===
On June 29, 2022, Bridges was arrested in Los Angeles for felony domestic violence and was released on $130,000 bond. He allegedly assaulted Mychelle Johnson in front of their two children. According to Johnson's hospital report which she posted to Instagram, she was an "adult victim of abuse by male partner" which included assault by strangulation, brain concussion, closed fracture of nasal bone, contusion of rib, multiple bruises, and a neck muscle strain. On July 19, Bridges was charged with one felony count of injuring a child's parent and two felony counts of child abuse. The following day, he pled not guilty to all three charges at his arraignment. On November 3, he pled no contest to the felony domestic charge and was sentenced to three years of probation. The other two charges were dismissed.

In October 2023, Bridges was charged with violating his probation and protection order after an October 6 incident where he allegedly threw billiard balls at Johnson's car, breaking her windshield while their children were inside the car. Bridges' current girlfriend is also alleged to have kicked the car while yelling in Johnson's direction. Bridges turned himself in on October 13 and was released upon paying $1,000 bond. At this time, Bridges had an outstanding warrant stemming from January 2023 that had yet to be served.

== See also ==
- List of people banned or suspended by the NBA
