= United Faith Christian Academy =

American Christian private school in North Carolina

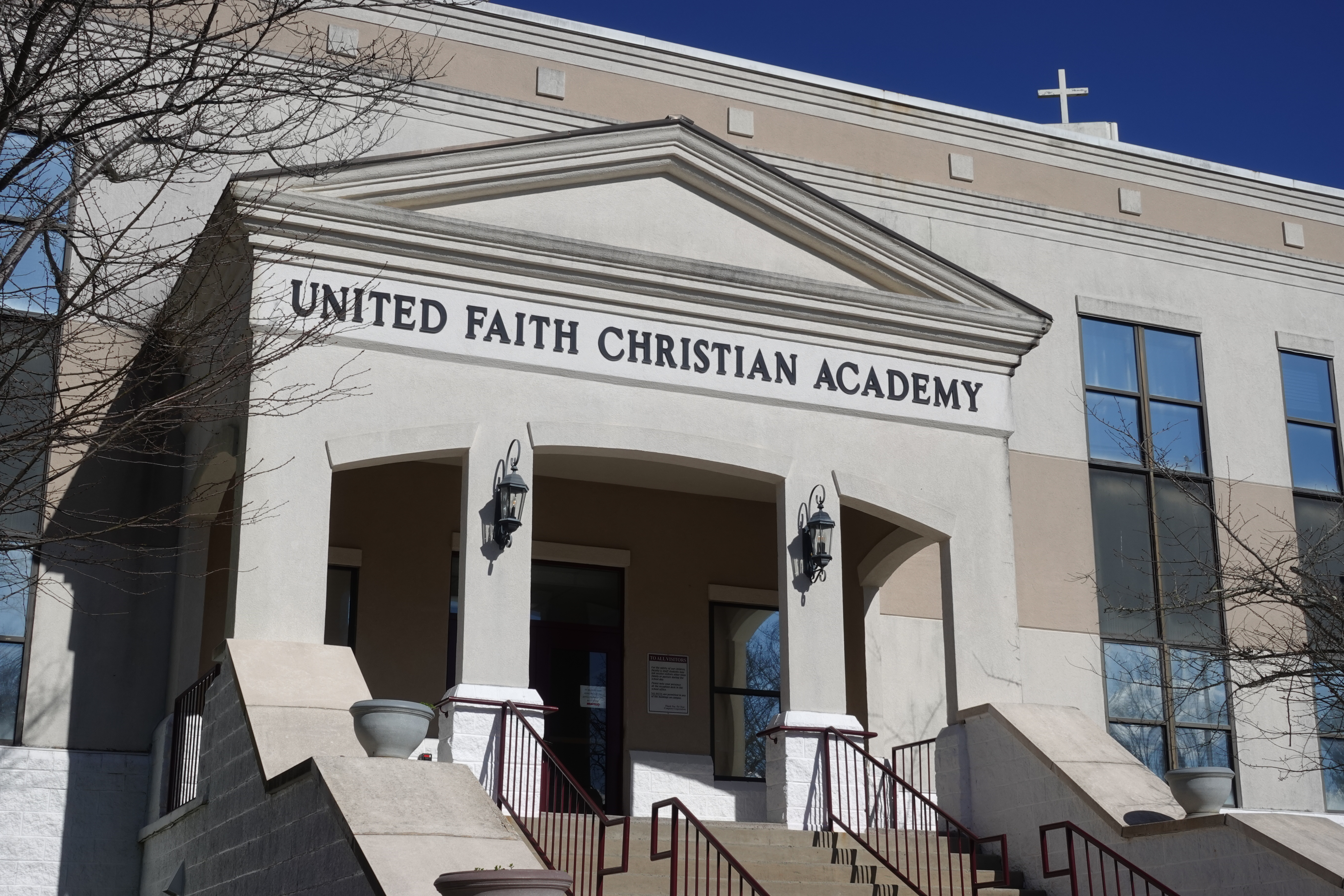
- United Faith Christian Academy Main Entrance

Location
- 8617 Providence Rd; Charlotte, North Carolina 28277; United States; 35°05′24″N 80°46′27″W

Information
- Other name: UFCA
- Type: Private, Christian
- Established: 1985 (41 years ago)
- CEEB code: 340701
- Headmaster: Susan Blumenthal
- Grades: PreK–12th Grade
- Enrollment: 240
- Colors: Maroon, black, and white
- Athletics: North Carolina Independent Schools Athletic Association (NCISAA)
- Mascot: Falcon
- Website: ufca.org

United Faith Christian Academy (UFCA) is a private, accredited, college-preparatory Christian school for children in Pre-Kindergarten to 12th grade that was founded in 1985. Its two-building facility is located in Charlotte, NC.

== Notable alumni ==
- Kenny Gabriel (class of 2008), professional basketball player who plays in Italy, played college basketball for the Auburn Tigers
- Ian Miller (class of 2010), professional basketball player who plays in Russia, played college basketball for the Florida State Seminoles
- Jaylen Sims (class of 2018), professional basketball player for the Greensboro Swarm, played college basketball for the UNC Wilmington Seahawks
