= Nick Richards =

Jamaican basketball player (born 1997)

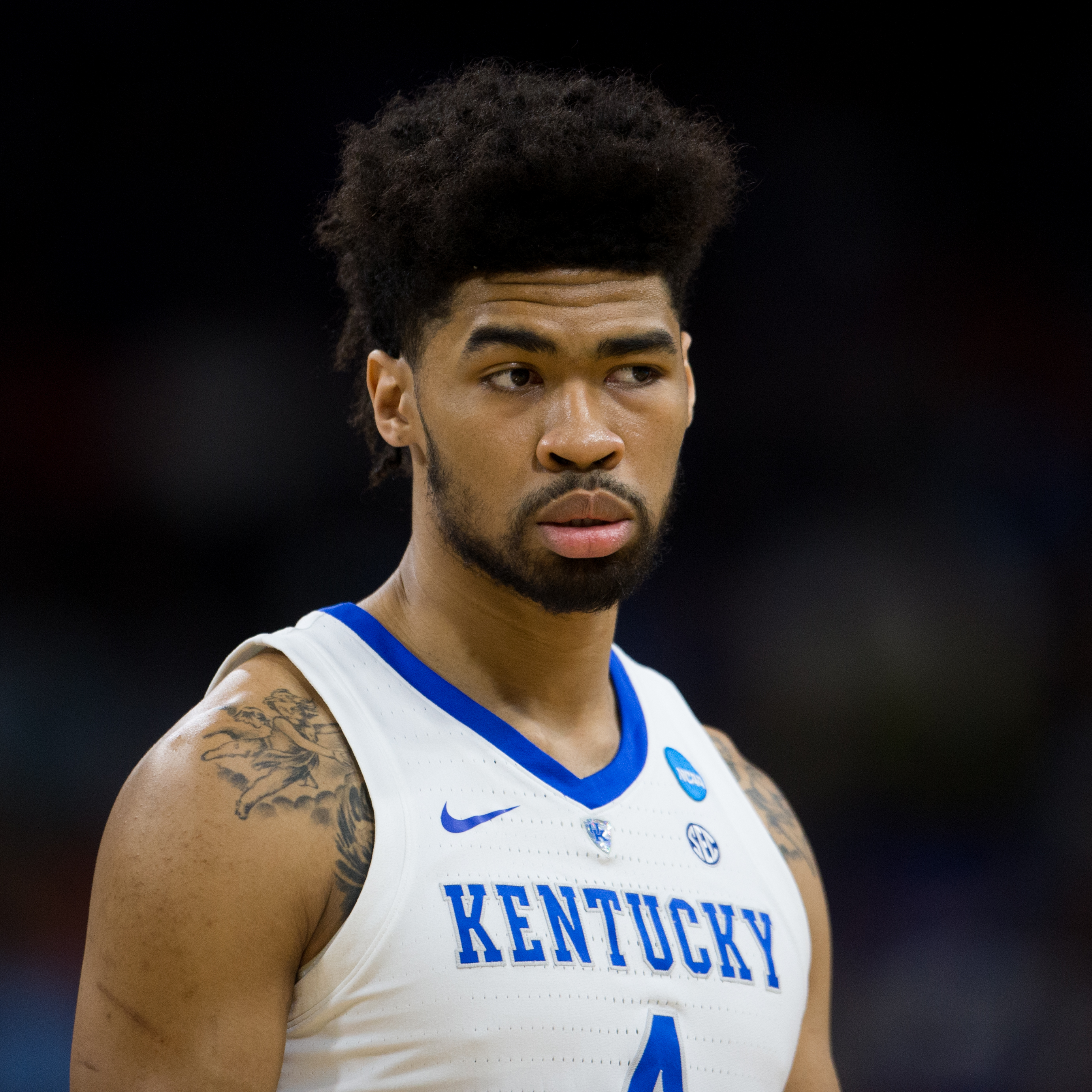
- Richards with Kentucky in 2019

No. 8 – Miami Heat
- Position: Center
- League: NBA

Personal information
- Born: November 29, 1997 (age 28) Kingston, Jamaica
- Listed height: 6 ft 11 in (2.11 m)
- Listed weight: 245 lb (111 kg)

Career information
- High school: St. Mary's (Manhasset, New York); The Patrick School (Hillside, New Jersey)
- College: Kentucky (2017–2020)
- NBA draft: 2020: 2nd round, 42nd overall pick
- Drafted by: New Orleans Pelicans
- Playing career: 2020–present

Career history
- 2020–2025: Charlotte Hornets
- 2021: →Greensboro Swarm
- 2025–2026: Phoenix Suns
- 2026: Chicago Bulls
- 2026–present: Miami Heat

Career highlights
- First-team All-SEC (2020); McDonald's All-American (2017)
- Stats at NBA.com
- Stats at Basketball Reference

Nicholas Richards (born November 29, 1997) is a Jamaican professional basketball player for the Miami Heat of the National Basketball Association (NBA). He played college basketball for the Kentucky Wildcats.

== High school career ==
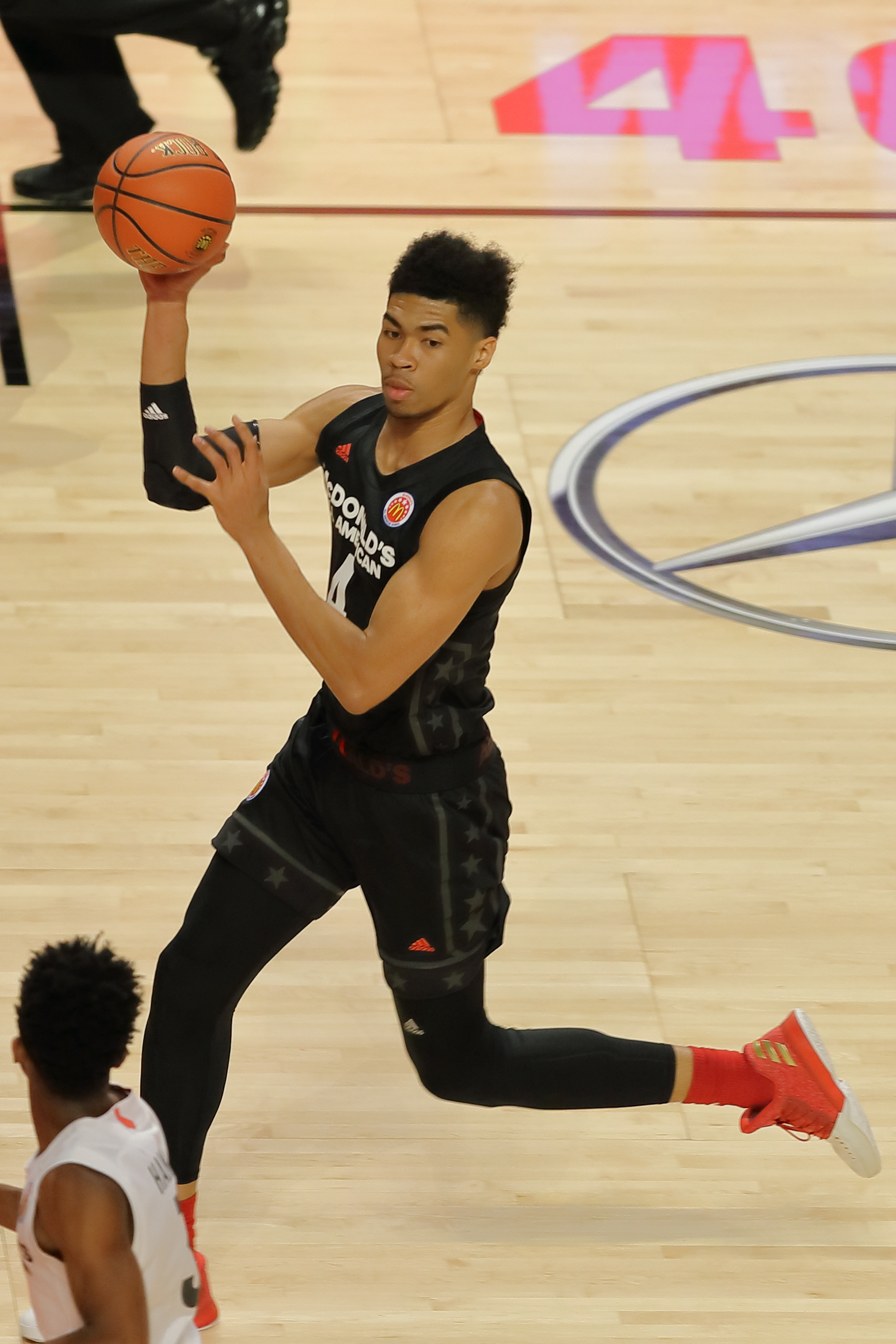
Richards at the 2017 McDonald's All-American Game

Born and raised in Kingston, Jamaica, Richards attended Jamaica College and competed in football, volleyball and track and field before being discovered by Andre Ricketts, a New York City-based basketball scout, in the summer of 2013 during a basketball camp in Jamaica. Ricketts brought him to the U.S., where Richards attended St. Mary's High School in Manhasset, New York. He transferred to The Patrick School in Hillside, New Jersey in 2014.

He was ranked a five-star recruit in the class of 2017 (by ESPN) and committed to the University of Kentucky in November 2016. He was UK's first commit in the class of 2017 and chose Kentucky over Syracuse and Arizona.

Richards played in the 2017 McDonald's All-American Boys Game, scoring two points, grabbing two rebounds and tallying two blocked shots in 14 minutes of action. Participating in the 2017 Jordan Brand Classic, he had ten points and three boards in 16 minutes of play. Richards was picked to play for the World Select Team at the 2017 Nike Hoop Summit. He saw 19:29 minutes of action during the game, scoring 12 points and grabbing three rebounds.

== College career ==
Richards had then-career highs of 25 points and 15 rebounds on November 22, 2017, contributing to the Wildcats' 86–67 win over IPFW. He averaged 5.1 points and 4.4 rebounds per game as a freshman but saw his playing time decrease as the season went on.

Richards posted 3.9 points and 3.3 rebounds per game as a sophomore and led the team in blocks. Following the season, he declared for the 2019 NBA draft but opted to return to Kentucky.

On November 8, 2019, Richards scored 21 points and grabbed 10 rebounds as Kentucky defeated Eastern Kentucky 91–49. He had 21 points, 12 rebounds and four blocks on January 4, 2020, in a 71–59 win over Missouri. Richards had 25 points including the two clinching free throws and 13 rebounds on January 25, in a 76–74 overtime win over Texas Tech. On February 4, Richards set a new career high with 27 points on an 80–72 win over Mississippi State. At the conclusion of the regular season, Richards was named to the First Team All-SEC. He averaged 14 points, 7.8 rebounds and 2.1 blocks per game. Following the season, Richards declared for the 2020 NBA draft.

== Professional career ==
=== Charlotte Hornets / Greensboro Swarm (2020–2025) ===
In the 2020 NBA draft, Richards was selected by the New Orleans Pelicans 42nd overall and immediately traded to the Charlotte Hornets in exchange for a 2024 second-round pick. On November 30, 2020, he signed his rookie-scale contract with the Hornets. Richards was assigned to the Greensboro Swarm and made his NBA G League debut on February 21, 2021, scoring 26 points and grabbing 10 rebounds. During the 2020–21 NBA season, he saw minimal playing time, appearing in 18 games for the Hornets with an average of 3.5 minutes and 0.8 points per game.

On December 6, 2021, Richards scored a season-high 12 points, alongside five rebounds and two assists, in a 127–124 overtime loss to the Philadelphia 76ers.

On October 19, 2022, Richards scored 19 points, alongside ten rebounds, in the Hornets' season-opening 129–102 loss to the San Antonio Spurs. On October 23, he scored a then-career-high 20 points, alongside eleven rebounds and two blocks, in a 126–109 win over the Atlanta Hawks. On March 22, 2023, Richards signed a three-year, $15 million contract extension with the Hornets.

On January 27, 2024, Richards scored a career-high 26 points, along with 13 rebounds in a 134–122 loss to the Utah Jazz.

=== Phoenix Suns (2025–2026) ===
On January 15, 2025, Richards was traded to the Phoenix Suns alongside one future second-round pick in exchange for Josh Okogie and three second-round picks. Richards made his Suns debut three days later, putting up a double-double of 21 points and 11 rebounds off the bench in a 125–121 win over the Detroit Pistons. He ended up becoming the first center in Suns franchise history to record a double-double of at least 20 points and 10 rebounds in his debut game while coming off the bench. On January 25, Richards recorded a near 20/20 double-double with 20 points and a career-high 19 rebounds (15 of them coming from the first half, tying a previous season high of 15 he had in a previous match against the Brooklyn Nets) in a 119–108 win over the Washington Wizards in his home debut for Phoenix. He made 36 appearances (34 starts) for the Suns, recording averages of 9.5 points, 8.6 rebounds and 0.6 assists.

Richards played in 28 contests (including two starts) for Phoenix during the 2025–26 NBA season, averaging 3.2 points, 3.3 rebounds and 0.3 assists.

=== Chicago Bulls (2026) ===
On February 5, 2026, Richards was traded to the Chicago Bulls in a three-team trade involving the Milwaukee Bucks. Richards made 20 appearances (four starts) for the Bulls during the remainder of the year, averaging 9.4 points and 7.6 rebounds.

=== Miami Heat (2026–present) ===
On August 27, 2026, Richards signed a one-year, $3.1 million contract with the Miami Heat. On October 21, he made his Heat debut, scoring four points in a 131–106 loss to the Minnesota Timberwolves.

== Career statistics ==
Legend
GP	Games played	GS	Games started	MPG	Minutes per game
FG%	Field goal percentage	3P%	3-point field goal percentage	FT%	Free throw percentage
RPG	Rebounds per game	APG	Assists per game	SPG	Steals per game
BPG	Blocks per game	PPG	Points per game	**Bold**	Career high

=== NBA ===
Year	Team	GP	GS	MPG	FG%	3P%	FT%	RPG	APG	SPG	BPG	PPG
2020–21	Charlotte	18	0	3.5	.444	.000	.636	.6	.1	.0	.0	.8
2021–22	Charlotte	50	5	7.3	.667	—	.698	1.7	.3	.2	.4	3.0
2022–23	Charlotte	65	9	18.7	.629	**1.000**	.749	6.4	.6	.2	1.1	8.2
2023–24	Charlotte	**67**	**51**	**26.2**	**.691**	.000	.737	8.0	.8	**.4**	1.1	**9.7**
2024–25	Charlotte	21	9	21.0	.561	.000	.678	7.5	**1.3**	.3	**1.2**	8.9
2024–25	Phoenix	36	34	22.7	.605	.000	**.822**	**8.6**	.6	.2	.8	9.5
2025–26	Phoenix	28	2	9.1	.493	—	.679	3.3	.3	.1	.5	3.2
2025–26	Chicago	20	4	22.4	.523	.278	.630	7.6	.4	.3	.9	9.4
Career		305	114	17.6	.621	.261	.724	5.8	.6	.2	.8	7.1

=== College ===
Year	Team	GP	GS	MPG	FG%	3P%	FT%	RPG	APG	SPG	BPG	PPG
2017–18	Kentucky	**37**	**37**	14.7	.616	–	.718	4.4	**.2**	**.1**	.9	5.1
2018–19	Kentucky	**37**	3	12.1	.598	–	.690	3.3	**.2**	**.1**	1.3	3.9
2019–20	Kentucky	31	30	**29.6**	**.642**	–	**.752**	**7.8**	**.2**	**.1**	**2.1**	**14.0**
Career		105	70	18.2	.627	–	.728	5.0	.2	.1	1.4	7.3
