= Grant Williams (basketball) =

American basketball player (born 1998)

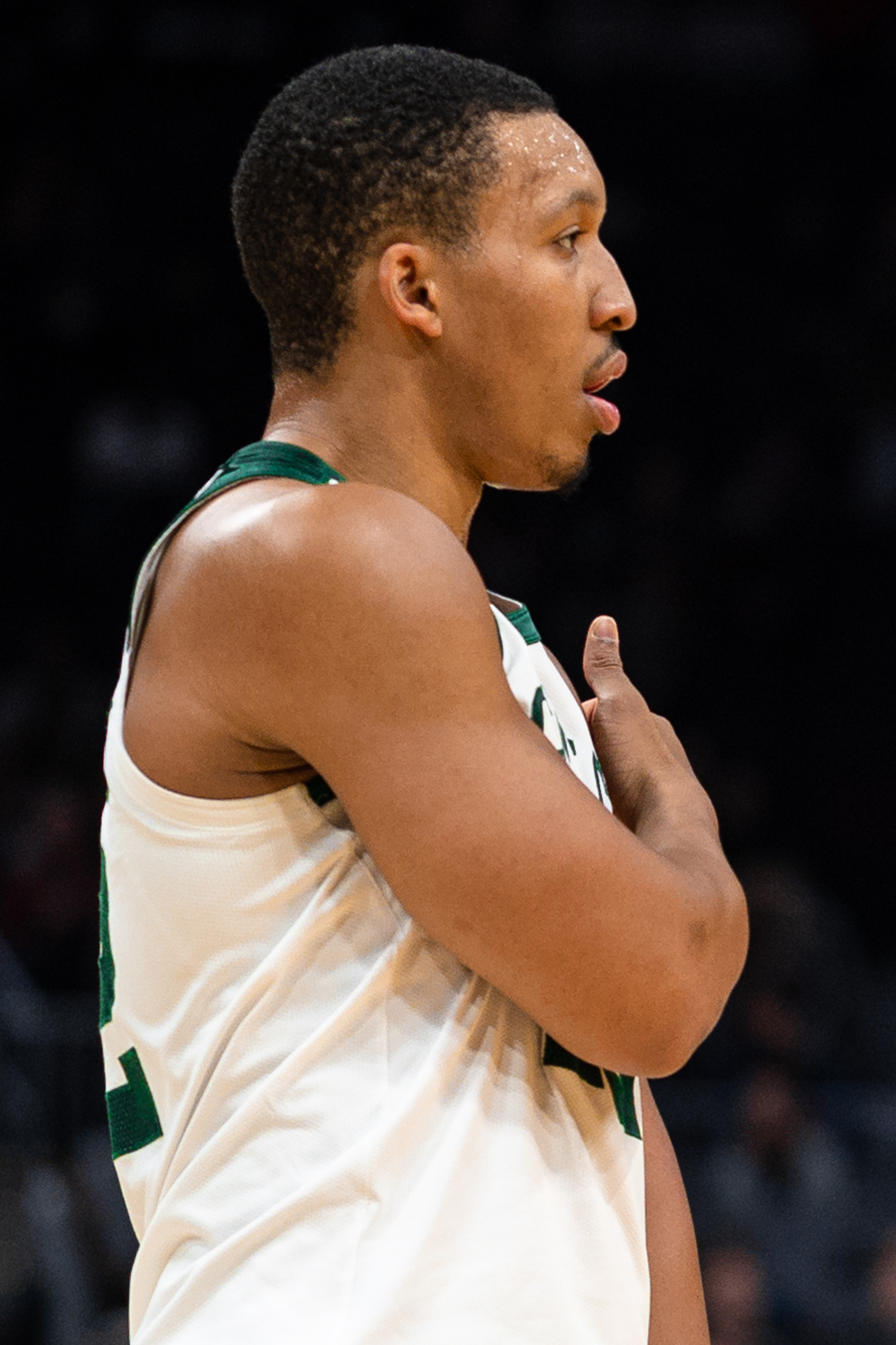
- Williams with the Boston Celtics in 2021

No. 2 – Charlotte Hornets
- Position: Power Forward/Small Forward
- League: NBA

Personal information
- Born: November 30, 1998 (age 27) Houston, Texas, U.S.
- Listed height: 6 ft 7 in (2.01 m)
- Listed weight: 236 lb (107 kg)

Career information
- High school: Providence Day School (Charlotte, North Carolina)
- College: Tennessee (2016–2019)
- NBA draft: 2019: 1st round, 22nd overall pick
- Drafted by: Boston Celtics
- Playing career: 2019–present

Career history
- 2019–2023: Boston Celtics
- 2023–2024: Dallas Mavericks
- 2024–present: Charlotte Hornets

Career highlights
- Consensus first-team All-American (2019); 2× SEC Player of the Year – Coaches (2018, 2019); SEC Player of the Year – AP (2019); 2× First-team All-SEC (2018, 2019)
- Stats at NBA.com
- Stats at Basketball Reference

Grant Dean Williams (born November 30, 1998) is an American professional basketball player for the Charlotte Hornets of the National Basketball Association (NBA). Williams played college basketball for the Tennessee Volunteers. He was drafted 22nd overall in the 2019 NBA draft by the Boston Celtics and reached the NBA Finals with the team in 2022. He has also played for the Dallas Mavericks.

Williams was elected as the First Vice President of the National Basketball Players Association in February 2023, replacing Andre Iguodala in the role.

== Early life ==
Born in Houston, Texas, Williams moved to Charlotte, North Carolina as a child. He attended Providence Day School in Charlotte, where he was teammates with future and fellow NBA player Devon Dotson. As a junior in 2014–15, he averaged 18 points, 9.6 rebounds and 2.3 blocks per game while leading the Chargers to a 25–5 overall record. During the summer, Williams joined his AAU team, Team CP3 All-Stars on the Nike Elite Youth Basketball League Circuit where he was teammates with fellow top 2016 recruit and future NBA player Harry Giles III. As a senior, Williams averaged 15.8 points, 10.1 rebounds, 4.0 assists and 3.0 blocks per game.

Rated a three-star recruit in the class of 2016, Williams committed to Tennessee on November 13, 2015.

== College career ==
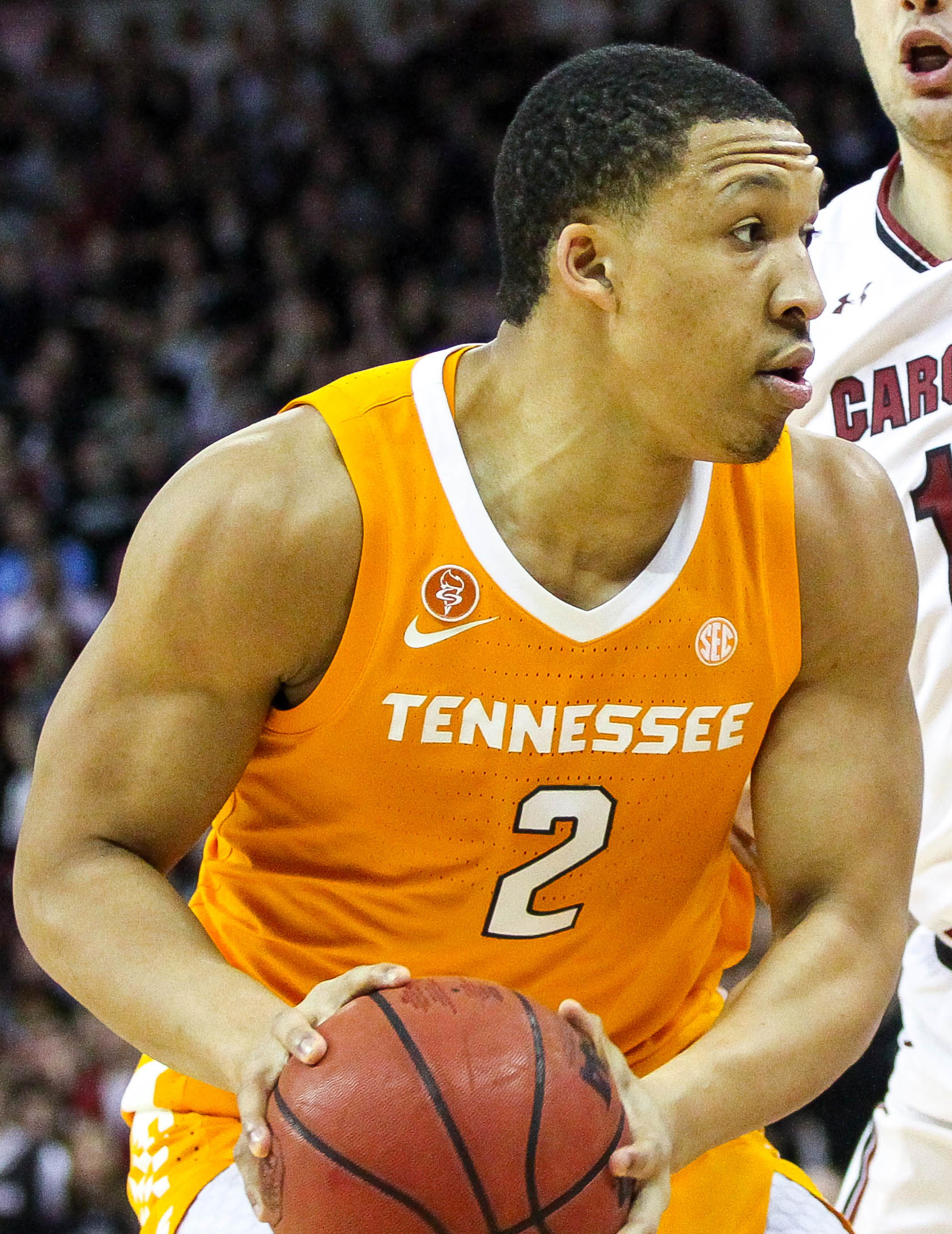
Williams at Tennessee

Williams was an All-Southeastern Conference (SEC) player as a freshman, sophomore and junior for the Tennessee Volunteers. He was awarded back-to-back SEC Player of the Year honors for the 2017–18 and 2018–19 seasons, becoming the first player to do so since Corliss Williamson in 1995. Williams led Tennessee as a third seed in the 2018 NCAA tournament and second seed in the 2019 NCAA tournament.

== Professional career ==
=== Boston Celtics (2019–2023) ===
Williams was selected with the 22nd overall draft pick by the Boston Celtics in the 2019 NBA draft. On July 11, 2019, the Celtics announced that they had signed him to a four-year, $11.8 million rookie-scale contract. On October 23, 2019, Williams made his professional debut, coming off the bench in a loss to the Philadelphia 76ers. On December 4, 2019, he made his first career start in a winning effort against the Miami Heat. In an effort to garner support for teammates making the 2020 NBA All-Star Game, Williams pledged to dye his hair pink if Jaylen Brown, Jayson Tatum and Kemba Walker all received a selection. However, Williams did not do so as Brown did not make the team. Williams finished his rookie season averaging just over 15 minutes per game in 69 games, 3.4 points per game and 2.6 rebounds per game.

Upon completion of the 2020–21 NBA season, Williams' second season in the league, he slightly increased his averages in all major statistical categories. He finished the season averaging just over 18 minutes per game, 4.7 points per game and 2.8 rebounds per game.

On March 21, 2022, Williams scored a then career-high 20 points in a win against the Oklahoma City Thunder. He finished the 2021–22 NBA season with career-best averages with over 24 minutes per game, 7.8 points per game and 3.6 rebounds per game. On May 15, Williams scored a career-high 27 points in a decisive game 7 win over the Milwaukee Bucks in the Eastern Conference Semifinals. His performance was highlighted by a 7-for-18 mark from three point range, records for both made threes and three attempts in an NBA game 7. Williams helped the Celtics reach the NBA Finals, but lost to the Golden State Warriors in six games.

On October 26, 2022, Williams was suspended for one game without pay for making contact with a game official during a 102–120 loss to the Chicago Bulls two days earlier.

On March 6, 2023, Williams missed two critical free throws in the final seconds, costing his team the victory. Adding to the disappointment, Williams yelled at Cavs shooting guard Donovan Mitchell before the shots that he would make them both. Despite his pledge, both shots missed their mark, resulting in a 118–114 loss in overtime. Williams was attacked online with fans naming him "Not him".

On May 19, 2023, during game 2 of the Eastern Conference Finals versus the Miami Heat, Williams had nine points, two rebounds, two assists and one block in 26 minutes off the bench. After Williams scored on a three-pointer to give Boston a 96–87 lead with 6:37 left, he mouthed some words to Heat forward Jimmy Butler while in transition to defense. Williams then fouled Butler on a made basket. They then confronted each other verbally, resulting in technical fouls being issued to both players. Butler said that the incident energized him; the Heat finished the game on a 24–9 run and won 111–105.

=== Dallas Mavericks (2023–2024) ===
On July 12, 2023, Williams was traded to the Dallas Mavericks in a sign-and-trade agreement, signing a four-year, $53.3 million contract. He made his debut for the Mavericks on October 25, 2023, in a 126–119 win over the San Antonio Spurs.

=== Charlotte Hornets (2024–present) ===
On February 8, 2024, Williams was traded to the Charlotte Hornets alongside Seth Curry and a 2027 first-round pick in exchange for P. J. Washington and two future second-round picks.

On November 23, 2024, Williams suffered a season-ending torn anterior cruciate ligament, meniscus, and other ligaments in the right knee during a game against the Milwaukee Bucks. Williams was driving to the basket late in the fourth quarter, losing his footing after bumping into Bucks center Brook Lopez, where he landed awkwardly with a long step and collapsed onto the court. He was helped off the court and did not return to the game.

On January 10, 2026, Williams officially made his return from injury, playing 13 minutes off the bench during a 150–95 victory over the Utah Jazz.

== Career statistics ==
Legend
GP	Games played	GS	Games started	MPG	Minutes per game
FG%	Field goal percentage	3P%	3-point field goal percentage	FT%	Free throw percentage
RPG	Rebounds per game	APG	Assists per game	SPG	Steals per game
BPG	Blocks per game	PPG	Points per game	**Bold**	Career high

=== NBA ===
==== Regular season ====
Year	Team	GP	GS	MPG	FG%	3P%	FT%	RPG	APG	SPG	BPG	PPG
2019–20	Boston	69	5	15.1	.412	.250	.722	2.6	1.0	.4	.5	3.4
2020–21	Boston	63	9	18.1	.437	.372	.588	2.8	1.0	.5	.4	4.7
2021–22	Boston	77	21	24.4	.475	**.411**	**.905**	3.6	1.0	.5	.7	7.8
2022–23	Boston	**79**	23	25.9	.454	.395	.770	4.6	1.7	.5	.4	8.1
2023–24	Dallas	47	**33**	26.4	.413	.376	.745	3.6	1.7	.5	.6	8.1
2023–24	Charlotte	29	10	**30.6**	**.503**	.373	.765	**5.1**	**3.2**	.7	.4	**13.9**
2024–25	Charlotte	16	7	29.9	.439	.365	.838	**5.1**	2.3	**1.1**	**.8**	10.4
2025–26	Charlotte	36	3	19.8	.426	.388	.815	3.9	1.6	.5	.5	7.0
Career		416	111	22.6	.450	.378	.778	3.7	1.5	.5	.5	7.2

==== Playoffs ====
Year	Team	GP	GS	MPG	FG%	3P%	FT%	RPG	APG	SPG	BPG	PPG
2020	Boston	17	0	10.0	**.577**	**.588**	.700	1.5	.4	.1	.3	2.8
2021	Boston	5	0	11.4	.500	.500	**1.000**	2.0	.8	.2	**.8**	3.4
2022	Boston	**24**	**5**	**27.3**	.433	.393	.808	**3.8**	.8	**.3**	**.8**	**8.6**
2023	Boston	15	0	17.7	.472	.450	.800	2.2	**1.2**	**.3**	.4	5.1
Career		61	5	18.8	.461	.433	.800	2.6	.8	.3	.5	5.7

=== College ===
Year	Team	GP	GS	MPG	FG%	3P%	FT%	RPG	APG	SPG	BPG	PPG
2016–17	Tennessee	32	29	25.4	.504	**.375**	.667	5.9	1.1	.8	**1.9**	12.6
2017–18	Tennessee	35	35	28.8	.473	.120	.764	6.0	1.9	.6	1.3	15.2
2018–19	Tennessee	**37**	**37**	**31.9**	**.564**	.326	**.819**	**7.5**	**3.2**	**1.1**	1.5	**18.8**
Career		104	101	28.9	.516	.291	.758	6.5	2.1	.9	1.5	15.7

== Personal life ==
His mother, Teresa Johnson, is an electrical engineer for NASA. His father, Gilbert, is a jazz artist and former college basketball player, who has worked as a bodyguard for musicians, including Prince. He is a cousin of former NBA players Salim and Damon Stoudamire. Turning down offers from Ivy League schools Harvard and Yale, Williams graduated from Tennessee in three years with a degree in business. At Tennessee, he received the C & C Millwright Athletic Scholarship.

Williams threw out the first pitch at the Boston Red Sox game on August 7, 2019.

Williams is also an avid sports card collector, which he often shares on his Instagram.

On April 29, 2026, Williams announced his engagement to former Tennessee softball player Kiki Milloy.
