= Jaylen Sims =

American basketball player (born 1998)

No. 30 – Ratiopharm Ulm
- Position: Shooting guard
- League: Basketball Bundesliga; EuroCup

Personal information
- Born: December 11, 1998 (age 27) Charlotte, North Carolina, U.S.
- Listed height: 6 ft 6 in (1.98 m)
- Listed weight: 210 lb (95 kg)

Career information
- High school: United Faith Christian (Charlotte, North Carolina)
- College: UNC Wilmington (2018–2022)
- NBA draft: 2022: undrafted
- Playing career: 2022–present

Career history
- 2022–2026: Greensboro Swarm
- 2025: Charlotte Hornets
- 2026–present: Ratiopharm Ulm

Career highlights
- NBA G League champion (2026); First-team All-CAA (2022)
- Stats at NBA.com
- Stats at Basketball Reference

Jaylen Terelle Sims (born December 11, 1998) is an American professional basketball player for Ratiopharm Ulm of the Basketball Bundesliga (BBL) and the EuroCup. He played college basketball for the UNC Wilmington Seahawks. Sims played four seasons for the Greensboro Swarm of the NBA G League and is the team's all-time leading scorer.

== High school career ==
Sims is a native of Charlotte, North Carolina, and attended United Faith Christian Academy. He was recruited by UNC Wilmington Seahawks assistant coach Doug Esleeck who had first started recruiting Sims as an assistant for the Mercer Bears. Sims' relationship with Esleeck was a major factor in his commitment to the Seahawks.

== College career ==
Sims led the Seahawks in scoring with 17.8 points per game as a junior in the 2020–21 season. He scored a career-high 29 points in a game against the Troy Trojans on November 28, 2020.

Sims led the Seahawks in points (16.4), rebounds (5.5) and assists (2.4) per game during his senior season in 2021–22. He was selected to the first-team all-Colonial Athletic Association (CAA). The Seahawks won the 2022 College Basketball Invitational and Sims was named as most outstanding player of the tournament.

Sims later declared for the NBA draft.

== Professional career ==
=== Greensboro Swarm / Charlotte Hornets (2022–2026) ===
After going undrafted in the 2022 NBA draft, Sims joined the Toronto Raptors for the 2022 NBA Summer League and on September 12, 2022, Sims signed with the Charlotte Hornets, his hometown team. He appeared in one preseason game before he was waived on October 14 and on November 4, he was named to the opening night roster for the Greensboro Swarm of the NBA G League.

In July 2023, Sims re-joined the Hornets for the 2023 NBA Summer League and on September 5, he signed with them. However, he was waived on September 29 and re-joined the Swarm on October 29.

Sims joined the Philadelphia 76ers for the 2024 NBA Summer League. On September 28, 2024, he signed with the Hornets, but was waived the same day. On October 27, Sims rejoined the Swarm. He became the Swarm's all-time leading scorer during the 2024–25 season with 2,216 points. Sims led the Swarm to their first ever NBA G League playoff berth in 2025.

On April 3, 2025, Sims signed a 10-day contract with the Hornets. On April 13, he was signed for the remainder of the season. That night, he scored a career-high 12 points in a loss to the Boston Celtics. Sims averaged 7.0 points, 1.0 rebounds and 2.0 assists per game during his stint with the Hornets.

Sims re-joined the Hornets for the 2025 NBA Summer League. On October 26, he was named to the Swarm's training camp roster for the 2025–26 season. Sims won the NBA G League championship with the Swarm in 2026.

On August 20, 2026, Sims' returning player rights were traded to the Iowa Wolves.

=== Ratiopharm Ulm (2026–present) ===
On June 14, 2026, Sims signed with Ratiopharm Ulm of the German Basketball Bundesliga (BBL) and the EuroCup.

== Career statistics ==
Legend
GP	Games played	GS	Games started	MPG	Minutes per game
FG%	Field goal percentage	3P%	3-point field goal percentage	FT%	Free throw percentage
RPG	Rebounds per game	APG	Assists per game	SPG	Steals per game
BPG	Blocks per game	PPG	Points per game	**Bold**	Career high

=== NBA ===
Year	Team	GP	GS	MPG	FG%	3P%	FT%	RPG	APG	SPG	BPG	PPG
2024–25	Charlotte	6	0	18.6	.429	.400	.800	1.0	2.0	.5	.2	7.0
Career		6	0	18.6	.429	.400	.800	1.0	2.0	.5	.2	7.0
