= List of 2023–24 NBA season transactions =

This is a list of transactions that occurred during the 2023 NBA off-season and the 2023–24 NBA season.

== Retirement ==
Date	Name	Team(s) played (years)	Age	Notes	Ref.
June 13	Sergei Monia	Portland Trail Blazers (2005–2006); Sacramento Kings (2006)	40	Also played in the NBA D-League and abroad	
June 14	Ekpe Udoh	Golden State Warriors (2010–2012); Milwaukee Bucks (2012–2014); Los Angeles Clippers (2014–2015); Utah Jazz (2017–2019)	36	Also played abroad Hired as an assistant coach by the Atlanta Hawks	
June 18	Lou Williams	Philadelphia 76ers (2005–2012); Atlanta Hawks (2012–2014; 2021–2022); Toronto Raptors (2014–2015); Los Angeles Lakers (2015–2017); Houston Rockets (2017); Los Angeles Clippers (2017–2021)	36	3× NBA Sixth Man of the Year (2015, 2018, 2019); Also played in the NBA D-League	
July 7	Luigi Datome	Detroit Pistons (2013–2015); Boston Celtics (2015)	35	Also played abroad	
July 12	Ryan Broekhoff	Dallas Mavericks (2018–2020)	32	Also played abroad	
July 12	Drew Gordon	Philadelphia 76ers (2014)	33	Also played in the NBA D-League/G League and abroad	
July 28	Udonis Haslem	Miami Heat (2003–2023)	43	3× NBA champion (2006, 2012, 2013); NBA All-Rookie Second Team (2004); Miami Heat All-Time leading rebounder No. 40 retired by the Miami Heat; Also played abroad	
August 29	Yi Jianlian	Milwaukee Bucks (2007–2008); New Jersey Nets (2008–2010); Washington Wizards (2010–2011); Dallas Mavericks (2012)	38	Also played in the NBA D-League and abroad	
August 31	Othello Hunter	Atlanta Hawks (2008–2010)	37	Also played in the NBA D-League and abroad	
September 29	Wayne Ellington	Minnesota Timberwolves (2009–2012); Memphis Grizzlies (2012–2013); Cleveland Cavaliers (2013); Dallas Mavericks (2013–2014); Los Angeles Lakers (2014–2015; 2021–2022); Brooklyn Nets (2015–2016); Miami Heat (2016–2019); Detroit Pistons (2019; 2020–2021); New York Knicks (2019–2020)	35	J. Walter Kennedy Citizenship Award (2016); Hired as a player development coach by the Miami Heat	
October 2	Josh Magette	Atlanta Hawks (2017–2018); Orlando Magic (2019–2020)	33	Also played in the NBA D-League/G League and abroad	
October 20	Andre Iguodala	Philadelphia 76ers (2004–2012); Denver Nuggets (2012–2013); Golden State Warriors (2013–2019; 2021–2023); Miami Heat (2020–2021)	39	4× NBA champion (2015, 2017, 2018, 2022); NBA Finals MVP (2015); NBA All-Star (2012); NBA All-Defensive First Team (2014); NBA All-Defensive Second Team (2011); NBA All-Rookie First Team (2005)	
October 23	Austin Rivers	New Orleans Hornets/Pelicans (2012–2015); Los Angeles Clippers (2015–2018); Washington Wizards (2018); Houston Rockets (2018–2020) New York Knicks (2020–2021) Denver Nuggets (2021–2022)Minnesota Timberwolves (2022–2023)	31	First player in NBA history to play for his father, coach Doc Rivers Hired by ESPN as an NBA analyst in 2023.	
October 30	Amir Johnson	Detroit Pistons (2005–2009); Toronto Raptors (2009–2015); Boston Celtics (2015–2017); Philadelphia 76ers (2017–2019)	36	NBA Hustle Award (2018); Final player to be drafted out of high school Also played in the NBA D-League/G League; Hired as an assistant coach by the NBA G League Ignite	
December 1	Terrence Ross	Toronto Raptors (2012–2017); Orlando Magic (2017–2023); Phoenix Suns (2023)	32	NBA Slam Dunk Contest champion (2013)	
December 9	Gorgui Dieng	Minnesota Timberwolves (2013–2020); Memphis Grizzlies (2020–2021); San Antonio Spurs (2021; 2022–2023); Atlanta Hawks (2021–2022)	33	NBA All-Rookie Second Team (2014); Hired as a basketball operations representative by the San Antonio Spurs	
December 31	Goran Dragić	Phoenix Suns (2008–2011; 2012–2015); Houston Rockets (2011–2012); Miami Heat (2015–2021); Toronto Raptors (2021–2022); Brooklyn Nets (2022); Chicago Bulls (2022–2023); Milwaukee Bucks (2023)	37	NBA All-Star (2018); All-NBA Third Team (2014); NBA Most Improved Player (2014); Also played abroad	
January 31	Marc Gasol	Memphis Grizzlies (2008–2019); Toronto Raptors (2019–2020); Los Angeles Lakers (2020–2021)	39	NBA champion (2019); 3x NBA All-Star (2012, 2015, 2017); All-NBA First Team (2015); All-NBA Second Team (2013); NBA Defensive Player of the Year (2013); NBA All-Defensive Second Team (2013); NBA All-Rookie Second Team (2009); No. 33 retired by the Memphis Grizzlies; Also played abroad	
February 9	Salah Mejri	Dallas Mavericks (2015–2019)	37	Also played in the NBA D-League and abroad First Tunisian to play in the NBA	
February 9	Nate Wolters	Milwaukee Bucks (2013–2015); New Orleans Pelicans (2015); Utah Jazz (2017)	32	Also played in the NBA D-League and abroad	
February 14	Hassan Whiteside	Sacramento Kings (2010–2012; 2020–2021); Miami Heat (2014–2019); Portland Trail Blazers (2019–2020); Utah Jazz (2021–2022)	34	NBA All-Defensive Second Team (2016); NBA rebounding leader (2017); 2× NBA blocks leader (2016, 2020); Also played in the NBA D-League and abroad	
March 11	Otto Porter Jr.	Washington Wizards (2013–2019); Chicago Bulls (2019–2021); Orlando Magic (2021); Golden State Warriors (2021–2022); Toronto Raptors (2022–2024)	30	NBA champion (2022)	
March 23	Nemanja Bjelica	Minnesota Timberwolves (2015–2018); Sacramento Kings (2018–2021); Miami Heat (2021); Golden State Warriors (2021–2022)	35	NBA champion (2022); Also played abroad	
April 2	Rajon Rondo	Boston Celtics (2006–2014); Dallas Mavericks (2014–2015); Sacramento Kings (2015–2016); Chicago Bulls (2016–2017); New Orleans Pelicans (2017–2018); Los Angeles Lakers (2018–2020; 2021–2022); Atlanta Hawks (2020–2021); Los Angeles Clippers (2021); Cleveland Cavaliers (2022)	38	2× NBA champion (2008, 2020); 4× NBA All-Star (2010–2013); All-NBA Third Team (2012); 2× NBA All-Defensive First Team (2010, 2011); 2× NBA All-Defensive Second Team (2009, 2012); 3× NBA assists leader (2012, 2013, 2016); NBA steals leader (2010); NBA All-Rookie Second Team (2007)	
April 16	Avery Bradley	Boston Celtics (2010–2017); Detroit Pistons (2017–2018); Los Angeles Clippers (2018–2019); Memphis Grizzlies (2019); Los Angeles Lakers (2019–2020; 2021–2022); Miami Heat (2020–2021); Houston Rockets (2021)	33	NBA Champion (2020); NBA All-Defensive First Team (2016); NBA All-Defensive Second Team champion (2013); Also played in the NBA D-League and abroad Hired as Vice President of Player Development by the Utah Jazz	
April 16	Blake Griffin	Los Angeles Clippers (2009–2018); Detroit Pistons (2018–2021); Brooklyn Nets (2021–2022); Boston Celtics (2022–2023)	35	6× NBA All-Star (2011–2015, 2019); 3× All-NBA Second Team (2012–2014); 2× All-NBA Third Team (2015, 2019); NBA Rookie of the Year (2011); NBA All-Rookie First Team (2011); NBA Slam Dunk Contest champion (2011)	
May 7	Nick Fazekas	Dallas Mavericks (2007–2008); Los Angeles Clippers (2008)	38	Also played in the NBA D-League and abroad	

== Front office movements ==
=== Head coaching changes ===
Off-season

Departure date	Team	Outgoing head coach	Reason for departure	Hire date	Incoming head coach	Last coaching position	Ref.
April 10	Detroit Pistons	Dwane Casey	Resigned	June 2	Monty Williams	Phoenix Suns head coach (2019–2023)	
April 10	Houston Rockets	Stephen Silas	Fired	April 25	Ime Udoka	Boston Celtics head coach (2021–2023)	
April 21	Toronto Raptors	Nick Nurse	Fired	June 13	Darko Rajaković	Memphis Grizzlies assistant coach (2020–2023)	
May 4	Milwaukee Bucks	Mike Budenholzer	Fired	June 5	Adrian Griffin	Toronto Raptors assistant head coach (2018–2023)	
May 13	Phoenix Suns	Monty Williams	Fired	June 6	Frank Vogel	Los Angeles Lakers head coach (2019–2022)	
May 16	Philadelphia 76ers	Doc Rivers	Fired	June 1	Nick Nurse	Toronto Raptors head coach (2018–2023)	

In-season

Departure date	Team	Outgoing head coach	Reason for departure	Hire date	Incoming head coach	Last coaching position	Ref.
January 23	Milwaukee Bucks	Adrian Griffin	Fired	January 23	Doc Rivers	Philadelphia 76ers head coach (2020–2023)	
January 25	Washington Wizards	Wes Unseld Jr.	Promoted to front office advisor	January 25	Brian Keefe	Washington Wizards assistant coach (2023–2024)	
February 19	Brooklyn Nets	Jacque Vaughn	Fired	February 20	Kevin Ollie	Brooklyn Nets assistant coach (2023–2024)	

=== General manager changes ===
Off-season

Departure date	Team	Outgoing general manager	Reason for departure	Hire date	Incoming general manager	Last managerial position	Ref.
April 19	Washington Wizards	Tommy Sheppard	Fired	June 12	Will Dawkins	Oklahoma City Thunder vice president of basketball operations (2020–2023)	
May 30	Golden State Warriors	Bob Myers	Stepped down	June 16	Mike Dunleavy Jr.	Golden State Warriors vice president of basketball operations (2021–2023)	
June 5	Los Angeles Clippers	Michael Winger	Hired by Wizards	June 7	Trent Redden	Los Angeles Clippers assistant general manager (2017–2023)	
June 5	Orlando Magic	John Hammond	Promoted	July 5	Anthony Parker	Orlando Magic assistant general manager (2021–2023)	

In-season

Departure date	Team	Outgoing general manager	Reason for departure	Hire date	Incoming general manager	Last managerial position	Ref.
February 12	Charlotte Hornets	Mitch Kupchak	Stepped down	March 5	Jeff Peterson	Brooklyn Nets assistant general manager (2019–2024)	

== Player movements ==
=== Trades ===
June
June 22	To Milwaukee Bucks: Draft rights to Andre Jackson Jr. (No. 36)	To Orlando Magic: 2030 MIL second-round pick; Cash considerations	
June 23	To Golden State Warriors: Draft rights to Trayce Jackson-Davis (No. 57)	To Washington Wizards: Cash considerations	
June 23	To Minnesota Timberwolves: Draft rights to Leonard Miller (No. 33)	To San Antonio Spurs: 2026 UTA second-round pick; 2028 MIN second-round pick	
June 23	Three-team trade		
June 23	To Boston Celtics: Kristaps Porziņģis (from Washington); Draft rights to Marcus Sasser (Note: Rights flipped to Detroit in larger trade completed on June 28.) (No. 25) (from Memphis); 2024 GSW protected first-round pick (Note: Boston will receive the pick if it is No. 5–30; if not conveyed in 2024, then in 2025 if No. 2–30; unprotected in 2026 if not already conveyed.) (from Memphis)	To Memphis Grizzlies: Marcus Smart (from Boston)	
June 23	To Washington Wizards: Tyus Jones (from Memphis); Danilo Gallinari (from Boston); Mike Muscala (from Boston); Draft rights to Julian Phillips (No. 35) (from Boston)		
June 23	Three-team trade		
June 23	To Indiana Pacers: Draft rights to Jarace Walker (No. 8) (from Washington); 2028 PHX second-round pick (Note: In a July 7 trade, Indiana received the right to swap this for New York's pick.) (from Phoenix); 2029 WAS second-round pick (from Washington)	To Phoenix Suns: Bradley Beal (from Washington); Jordan Goodwin (from Washington); Isaiah Todd (from Washington)	
June 23	To Washington Wizards: Chris Paul (from Phoenix); Landry Shamet (from Phoenix); Draft rights to Bilal Coulibaly (from Indiana); 2024 protected right to swap first-round picks (Note: Washington has the right to swap picks if its own pick is No. 1–12.) (from Phoenix); 2024 PHX second-round pick (from Phoenix); 2025 PHX second-round pick (from Phoenix); 2026 right to swap first-round picks (Note: Washington has the right to swap its pick if it is No. 1–8 and it already conveyed its own first-round pick to New York by 2025; if the New York conveyance has not been met, Washington's swap right is extinguished.) (from Phoenix); 2026 PHX second-round pick (from Phoenix); 2027 PHX second-round pick (from Phoenix); 2028 right to swap first-round picks (Note: Brooklyn has the right to swap a 2028 first-round pick—Philadelphia's subject to conveyability and protection, as well as their own—for the Suns'; Washington may then swap for the pick Phoenix holds.) (from Phoenix); 2030 right to swap first-round picks (from Phoenix); 2030 PHX second-round pick (from Phoenix); Cash considerations		
June 23	Four-team trade		
June 23	To Denver Nuggets: Draft rights to Julian Strawther (No. 29) (from Indiana); Draft rights to Jalen Pickett (No. 32) (from Indiana); Draft rights to Hunter Tyson (No. 37) (from Oklahoma City); 2024 second-round pick (Note: The less favorable of the picks originally belonging to Charlotte and Minnesota.) (from Oklahoma City)	To Indiana Pacers: Draft rights to Mojave King (No. 47) (from Los Angeles); 2024 first-round pick (Note: The least favorable of the four picks originally belonging to Houston, Los Angeles Clippers, Oklahoma City, and Utah; Houston's pick is protected No. 1–4, Utah's No. 1–10. Indiana traded this pick to Toronto in January 2024 as part of the package for Pascal Siakam.) (from Oklahoma City); Cash considerations (from Los Angeles)	
June 23	To Los Angeles Lakers: Draft rights to Maxwell Lewis (No. 40) (from Denver)	To Oklahoma City Thunder: 2029 DEN protected first-round pick (Note: If the Thunder receive the Nuggets' protected pick in 2027 or 2028, this pick becomes available two years later if No. 6–30; otherwise this will convert to Denver's 2030 second-round pick.) (from Denver)	
June 28	To Atlanta Hawks: Draft rights to Mouhamed Gueye (No. 39)	To Boston Celtics: 2027 ATL second-round pick	
June 28	To Boston Celtics: Draft rights to Colby Jones (Note: Rights flipped to Sacramento.) (No. 34); Draft rights to Mouhamed Gueye (Note: Rights flipped to Atlanta.) (No. 39)	To Charlotte Hornets: Draft rights to James Nnaji (No. 31)	
June 28	To Boston Celtics: Draft rights to James Nnaji (Note: Rights flipped to Charlotte.) (No. 31); 2025 second-round pick (Note: The most favorable of the picks originally belonging to Detroit (if No. 31–55), Golden State and Washington.); 2026 second-round pick (Note: The most favorable of the picks originally belonging to Minnesota, New Orleans, New York and Portland.)	To Detroit Pistons: Draft rights to Marcus Sasser (No. 25)	
June 28	To Boston Celtics: Draft rights to Jordan Walsh (No. 38); 2024 DAL second-round pick	To Sacramento Kings: Draft rights to Colby Jones (No. 34)	
June 28	To Chicago Bulls: Draft rights to Julian Phillips (No. 35)	To Washington Wizards: 2026 CHI second-round pick; 2027 CHI second-round pick	
June 30	To Detroit Pistons: Cash considerations	To Los Angeles Clippers: Draft rights to Balša Koprivica (2021 No. 57)	
July
July 6	To Brooklyn Nets: Cash considerations	To Detroit Pistons: Joe Harris; 2027 DAL second-round pick; 2029 MIL second-round pick	
July 6	To Brooklyn Nets: 2024 BKN protected second-round pick (Note: Brooklyn will receive the pick if it is No. 56–60, otherwise they receive nothing.)	To Houston Rockets: Patty Mills; 2028 MIL second-round pick	
July 6	To Dallas Mavericks: Draft rights to Dereck Lively II (No. 12)	To Oklahoma City Thunder: Dāvis Bertāns; Draft rights to Cason Wallace (No. 10)	
July 6	To Dallas Mavericks: Richaun Holmes; Draft rights to Olivier-Maxence Prosper (No. 24)	To Sacramento Kings: Cash considerations	
July 6	To Detroit Pistons: Monté Morris	To Washington Wizards: 2027 second-round pick (Note: The more favorable of the picks originally belonging to Brooklyn and Dallas.)	
July 6	To Golden State Warriors: Chris Paul	To Washington Wizards: Patrick Baldwin Jr.; Jordan Poole; Ryan Rollins; 2027 GSW second-round pick; 2030 GSW protected first-round pick (Note: Washington will receive the pick if it is No. 21–30, otherwise they receive Golden State's second-round pick.); Cash considerations	
July 6	To Indiana Pacers: 2028 DAL second-round pick; 2030 SAC second-round pick	To Sacramento Kings: Chris Duarte	
July 6	To Miami Heat: Cash considerations	To Oklahoma City Thunder: Victor Oladipo; 2029 MIA second-round pick; 2030 MIA second-round pick	
July 6	Three-team trade		
July 6	To Cleveland Cavaliers: Max Strus (sign-and-trade) (from Miami)	To Miami Heat: 2026 LAL second-round pick (from Cleveland); 2027 second-round pick (from San Antonio) (Note: The least favorable of the picks originally belonging to Houston, Indiana, Miami, Oklahoma and San Antonio.)	
July 6	To San Antonio Spurs: Cedi Osman (from Cleveland); Lamar Stevens (from Cleveland); 2026 second-round pick (from Miami) (Note: The least favorable of the picks originally belonging to Dallas, Oklahoma and Philadelphia.); 2030 CLE second-round pick (from Cleveland); Cash considerations (from Cleveland)		
July 7	To Atlanta Hawks: Rudy Gay; 2026 MEM protected second-round pick (Note: Atlanta will receive the pick if it is No. 31–42, otherwise the pick goes to Portland and the Hawks receive nothing. This pick was traded to Oklahoma City on July 12.)	To Utah Jazz: John Collins	
July 7	To Indiana Pacers: Obi Toppin	To New York Knicks: 2028 second-round pick (Note: The less favorable of the picks originally belonging to Indiana and Phoenix.); 2029 second-round pick (Note: The less favorable of the picks originally belonging to Indiana and Washington.)	
July 8	To Cleveland Cavaliers: Damian Jones	To Utah Jazz: Cash considerations	
July 8	Five-team trade		
July 8	To Atlanta Hawks: Usman Garuba (from Houston); TyTy Washington Jr. (from Houston); 2025 MIN second-round pick (from Houston); 2028 HOU second-round pick (from Houston); Cash considerations (from Oklahoma City)	To Houston Rockets: Dillon Brooks (sign-and-trade) (from Memphis); Draft rights to Alpha Kaba (2017 No. 60) (from Atlanta); 2026 LAC second-round pick (Note: Memphis has the right to swap the most favorable of the picks originally belonging to Boston, Indiana, and Miami for the pick belonging to the Clippers; after that, Houston will receive either the Clippers' pick (if swapped) or the most favorable of the Boston/Indiana/Miami picks, whichever is less favorable.) (from Los Angeles); 2027 MEM second-round pick (from Los Angeles)	
July 8	To Los Angeles Clippers: Kenyon Martin Jr. (from Houston)	To Memphis Grizzlies: Josh Christopher (from Houston); Draft rights to Vanja Marinković (2019 No. 60) (from Los Angeles)	
July 8	To Oklahoma City Thunder: Patty Mills (from Houston); 2024 HOU second-round pick (from Houston); 2029 HOU second-round pick (from Houston); 2030 HOU second-round pick (from Houston)		
July 11	To Memphis Grizzlies: Isaiah Todd; 2024 right to swap first-round picks (Note: Washington has the right to swap picks with Phoenix if the Washington pick is No. 1–12, after which Memphis can swap with Phoenix.); 2030 right to swap first-round picks (Note: Washington has the right to swap picks with Phoenix, after which Memphis can swap with Phoenix.)	To Phoenix Suns: 2025 NOP second-round pick; 2028 MEM second-round pick; 2029 MEM second-round pick	
July 12	To Atlanta Hawks: Patty Mills	To Oklahoma City Thunder: Usman Garuba; Rudy Gay; TyTy Washington Jr.; 2026 GSW second-round pick	
July 12	Three-team trade		
July 12	To Boston Celtics: 2024 second-round pick (Note: More favorable of the picks originally belonging to Chicago and New Orleans.) (from San Antonio); 2025 right to swap second-round picks (Note: Most favorable of the picks originally belonging to Detroit, Golden State and Washington with pick originally belonging to Dallas.) (from Dallas); 2030 DAL second-round pick (from Dallas)	To Dallas Mavericks: Grant Williams (sign-and-trade) (from Boston); 2025 TOR second-round pick (from San Antonio); 2028 MIA second-round pick (from San Antonio)	
July 12	To San Antonio Spurs: Reggie Bullock (from Dallas); 2030 right to swap first-round picks (from Dallas)		
July 16	To Orlando Magic: 2026 right to swap first-round picks (Note: Washington has the right to swap first-round picks with Phoenix if Washington still owns its own pick and it is in the top eight; Orlando then has the right to swap picks with Phoenix.)	To Phoenix Suns: 2024 DEN second-round pick; 2026 second-round pick (Note: The least favorable of the picks originally belonging to Detroit, Milwaukee, and Orlando.); 2028 BOS protected second-round pick (Note: Phoenix will receive the pick if it is No. 46–60, otherwise it receives nothing.)	
July 17	To Phoenix Suns: 2024 SAS protected second-round pick (Note: Phoenix will receive if pick is 49-54, otherwise they receive nothing.)	To San Antonio Spurs: Cameron Payne; 2025 NOP second-round pick; Cash considerations	
September
September 27	Three-team trade		
September 27	To Milwaukee Bucks: Damian Lillard (from Portland)	To Phoenix Suns: Grayson Allen (from Milwaukee); Keon Johnson (from Portland); Nassir Little (from Portland); Jusuf Nurkić (from Portland)	
September 27	To Portland Trail Blazers: Deandre Ayton (from Phoenix); Toumani Camara (from Phoenix); Jrue Holiday (from Milwaukee); 2028 right to swap first-round picks (from Milwaukee); 2029 MIL first-round pick (from Milwaukee); 2030 right to swap first-round picks (from Milwaukee)		
October
October 1	To Boston Celtics: Jrue Holiday	To Portland Trail Blazers: Malcolm Brogdon; Robert Williams; 2024 GSW protected first-round pick (Note: Portland will receive the pick if it is No. 5–30, rolling over to 2025 if No. 2–30, then unprotected in 2026.); 2029 BOS first-round pick	
October 17	To Houston Rockets: Victor Oladipo; Jeremiah Robinson-Earl	To Oklahoma City Thunder: Kevin Porter Jr.; 2027 MIN second-round pick; 2028 MIL second-round pick	
November
November 1	Three-team trade		
November 1	To Los Angeles Clippers: James Harden (from Philadelphia); Filip Petrušev (from Philadelphia); P. J. Tucker (from Philadelphia)	To Oklahoma City Thunder: 2027 first-round pick swap (Note: Oklahoma City can swap for Denver's pick (if No. 6–30) or the Clippers' pick.) (from Los Angeles); Cash considerations (from Los Angeles)	
November 1	To Philadelphia 76ers: Nicolas Batum (from Los Angeles); Robert Covington (from Los Angeles); Kenyon Martin Jr. (from Los Angeles); Marcus Morris Sr. (from Los Angeles); 2024 second-round pick (Note: The most favorable of the picks originally belonging to Cleveland, Indiana, Toronto, and Utah, unless the most favorable pick is that from Cleveland or Utah, in which case Philadelphia will receive the second-most favorable pick.) (from Los Angeles); 2026 first-round pick (Note: The least favorable of the first-round picks originally belonging to Houston (if No. 5–30), the Clippers and Oklahoma City.) (from Oklahoma City); 2028 LAC first-round pick (from Los Angeles); 2029 protected right to swap first-round picks (Note: Philadelphia may swap for the Clippers' pick if that pick is No. 4–30.) (from Los Angeles); 2029 LAC second-round pick (from Los Angeles); Cash considerations (from Los Angeles)		
November 3	To Los Angeles Clippers: Draft rights to Luka Mitrović (2015 No. 60)	To Sacramento Kings: Filip Petrušev; Cash considerations	(Note: Although the trade was officially announced on November 3, Petrušev was already listed on the Kings' roster on November 2.)
December
December 30	To New York Knicks: Precious Achiuwa; O.G. Anunoby; Malachi Flynn	To Toronto Raptors: RJ Barrett; Immanuel Quickley; 2024 DET second-round pick	
January
January 14	To Detroit Pistons: Danilo Gallinari; Mike Muscala	To Washington Wizards: Marvin Bagley III; Isaiah Livers; 2025 second-round pick (Note: The less favorable of the picks originally belonging to Golden State and Washington.); 2026 second-round pick (Note: After swap rights involving picks originally belonging to Minnesota/New York and New Orleans/Portland are resolved, Washington will receive the less favorable pick of the more favorable pick from each pairing—e.g. if New York and Portland turned out to be the more favorable picks, Washington would receive the less favorable of the two.)	
January 17	To Indiana Pacers: Kira Lewis Jr. (Note: Indiana flipped Lewis to Toronto later the same day.); 2024 second-round pick (Note: Boston has the right to swap picks with New Orleans, after which New Orleans will convey the available pick to Indiana.)	To New Orleans Pelicans: Cash considerations	
January 17	To Indiana Pacers: Pascal Siakam	To Toronto Raptors: Bruce Brown; Kira Lewis Jr.; Jordan Nwora; 2024 IND protected first-round pick (Note: Toronto will receive the pick if it's No. 4–30, otherwise they'll receive the least favorable of the 2024 second-round picks originally belonging to Cleveland, Indiana, and Utah, as well as Indiana's 2025 second-round pick.); 2024 first-round pick (Note: The least favorable of the four picks originally belonging to Houston, Los Angeles Clippers, Oklahoma City, and Utah; Houston's pick is protected No. 1–4, Utah's No. 1–10. Toronto traded this pick to Utah on February 8, 2024.); 2026 IND protected first-round pick (Note: Toronto will receive the pick if it's No. 5–30, rolling over to 2027 with the same protection; if it falls No. 1–4 in both years, it will convert to Utah's 2027 second-round pick and Dallas's 2028 second-round pick.)	
January 23	To Charlotte Hornets: Kyle Lowry; 2027 MIA protected first-round pick (Note: Charlotte will receive the pick if it's No. 15–30, otherwise they will receive Miami's 2028 first-round pick)	To Miami Heat: Terry Rozier	
February
February 1	To Houston Rockets: Steven Adams	To Memphis Grizzlies: Victor Oladipo; 2024 OKC second-round pick; 2024 protected second-round pick (Note: The more favorable of the picks originally belonging to Brooklyn (protected range unknown) and Golden State (if No. 31–55); if both picks fall in their protected ranges, Memphis receives nothing.); 2025 second-round pick (Note: The more favorable of the picks originally belonging to Houston and Oklahoma; the Houston pick is only available if Houston conveys a first-round pick to Oklahoma in 2024, a pick Oklahoma City can then convey to Toronto.)	
February 7	To Boston Celtics: Xavier Tillman	To Memphis Grizzlies: Lamar Stevens; 2027 ATL second-round pick; 2030 DAL second-round pick	
February 8	To Boston Celtics: Jaden Springer	To Philadelphia 76ers: 2024 second-round pick (Note: The more favorable of the picks originally belonging to Chicago and New Orleans.)	
February 8	To Boston Celtics: 2027 protected second-round pick (Note: The less favorable of the picks originally belonging to New Orleans and Portland, if No. 56–60.)	To Portland Trail Blazers: Dalano Banton; Cash considerations	
February 8	To Brooklyn Nets: Dennis Schröder; Thaddeus Young	To Toronto Raptors: Spencer Dinwiddie	
February 8	To Charlotte Hornets: Seth Curry; Grant Williams; 2027 DAL protected first-round pick (Note: Charlotte will receive the pick if it's No. 3–30, otherwise they will receive Miami's 2028 second-round pick.)	To Dallas Mavericks: P. J. Washington; 2024 BOS second-round pick; 2028 second-round pick (Note: The less favorable of the picks originally belonging to Charlotte and the Los Angeles Clippers.)	
February 8	To Charlotte Hornets: Dāvis Bertāns; Tre Mann; Vasilije Micić; 2024 HOU second-round pick; 2025 PHI second-round pick; Cash considerations	To Oklahoma City Thunder: Gordon Hayward	
February 8	To Dallas Mavericks: 2024 first-round pick (Note: The second-most favorable of the picks originally belonging to Houston (if No. 5–30), Los Angeles Clippers, Oklahoma City, and Utah (if No. 11–30). Dallas flipped this pick to Washington later the same day.)	To Oklahoma City Thunder: 2028 right to swap first-round picks (Note: Limited to the two teams' original picks.)	
February 8	To Dallas Mavericks: Daniel Gafford	To Washington Wizards: Richaun Holmes; 2024 first-round pick (Note: The second-least favorable of the four picks originally belonging to Houston, Los Angeles Clippers, Oklahoma City, and Utah; Houston's pick is protected No. 1–4, Utah's No. 1–10.)	
February 8	To Denver Nuggets: Cash considerations	To Los Angeles Clippers: Draft rights to Ismaël Kamagate (2022 No. 46)	
February 8	To Detroit Pistons: Troy Brown Jr.; Shake Milton; 2030 MIN second-round pick	To Minnesota Timberwolves: Monté Morris	
February 8	To Detroit Pistons: Ryan Arcidiacono; Malachi Flynn; Evan Fournier; Quentin Grimes; 2028 NYK second-round pick; 2029 NYK second-round pick; Cash considerations	To New York Knicks: Bojan Bogdanović; Alec Burks	
February 8	To Detroit Pistons: Danuel House Jr.; 2024 NYK second-round pick; Cash considerations	To Philadelphia 76ers: 2028 DET protected second-round pick (Note: Philadelphia will receive the pick if it's No. 56–60.)	
February 8	To Detroit Pistons: Simone Fontecchio	To Utah Jazz: Kevin Knox II; Draft rights to Gabriele Procida (2022 No. 36); 2024 second-round pick (Note: The more favorable of the picks originally belonging to Memphis and Washington.)	
February 8	To Golden State Warriors: 2024 second-round pick (Note: The least favorable of three picks owned by Indiana. Milwaukee is the only pick definitely held by Indiana, the less favorable of Chicago/New Orleans is another, and the third is the least favorable of Cleveland/Indiana/Utah; this conflicts Toronto's claim on Indiana's pick, which they will receive if the Pacers' first-round pick is No. 1–3, so some detail is incorrect.)	To Indiana Pacers: Cory Joseph; 2025 CHA protected second-round pick (Note: Indiana will the pick if it's No. 56–60.); Cash considerations	
February 8	To Milwaukee Bucks: Patrick Beverley	To Philadelphia 76ers: Cameron Payne; 2027 MIL second-round pick	
February 8	To Milwaukee Bucks: Draft rights to Dimitrios Agravanis (2015 No. 59)	To Sacramento Kings: Robin Lopez; Cash considerations	
February 8	To Toronto Raptors: Ochai Agbaji; Kelly Olynyk	To Utah Jazz: Kira Lewis Jr.; Otto Porter Jr.; 2024 first-round pick (Note: The least favorable of the four picks originally belonging to Houston, Los Angeles Clippers, Oklahoma City, and Utah; Houston's pick is protected No. 1–4, Utah's No. 1–10. Toronto traded this pick to Utah on February 8, 2024.)	
February 8	Three-team trade		
February 8	To Brooklyn Nets: Keita Bates-Diop (from Phoenix); Jordan Goodwin (from Phoenix); Draft rights to Vanja Marinković (from Memphis); 2026 second-round pick (Note: The least favorable of the picks originally belonging to Detroit, Milwaukee, and Orlando.) (from Phoenix); 2028 MEM second-round pick (from Phoenix); 2029 MEM second-round pick (from Phoenix)	To Memphis Grizzlies: Chimezie Metu (from Phoenix); Yuta Watanabe (from Phoenix); right to swap 2026 first-round picks (Note: Memphis may swap its own pick for the least favorable of the picks originally belonging to Orlando, Phoenix, and Washington.) (from Phoenix)	
February 8	To Phoenix Suns: Royce O'Neale (from Brooklyn); David Roddy (from Memphis)		
February 8	Three-team trade		
February 8	To Indiana Pacers: Furkan Korkmaz (from Philadelphia); Doug McDermott (from San Antonio); 2024 second-round pick (Note: The most favorable of the picks originally belonging to a) Indiana, b) Toronto, and c) the less favorable of Cleveland/Utah.) (from Philadelphia); 2029 POR second-round pick (from Philadelphia); Cash considerations (from Philadelphia)	To Philadelphia 76ers: Buddy Hield (from Indiana)	
February 8	To San Antonio Spurs: Marcus Morris Sr. (from Philadelphia); 2029 LAC second-round pick (from Philadelphia); Cash considerations (from Philadelphia)		

=== Free agents ===
The NBA's free agency period began on June 30 at 6 p.m. EST.

Players were allowed to sign new offers starting on July 6 at 12 p.m. ET, after the moratorium ended.

^{R}	Denotes unsigned players whose free-agent rights were renounced
	Denotes sign-and-trade players
^{C}	Denotes player who is claimed off waivers (same contract, different team)
	Denotes signed player who failed to make opening-day roster
	Denotes player whose deal was later turned into a two-way contract
	Denotes player signed to 10-day contract
	Denotes restricted free agent whose offer sheet was matched by his old team

Player	Date signed	New team	Former team	Ref
Orlando Robinson (RFA)	July 1	Miami Heat (previously on a two-way contract)		
Keita Bates-Diop	July 2	Phoenix Suns	San Antonio Spurs	
Miles Bridges (RFA)	July 2	Charlotte Hornets		
Thomas Bryant	July 2	Miami Heat	Denver Nuggets	
Drew Eubanks	July 2	Phoenix Suns	Portland Trail Blazers	
Chimezie Metu	July 2	Phoenix Suns	Sacramento Kings	
Josh Richardson	July 2	Miami Heat	New Orleans Pelicans	
Yuta Watanabe	July 2	Phoenix Suns	Brooklyn Nets	
Derrick Rose**	July 3	Memphis Grizzlies	New York Knicks	
Malik Beasley**	July 6	Milwaukee Bucks	Los Angeles Lakers	
Oshae Brissett	July 6	Boston Celtics	Indiana Pacers	
Bruce Brown*	July 6	Indiana Pacers	Denver Nuggets	
Julian Champagnie (RFA)	July 6	San Antonio Spurs (previously on a two-way contract)		
Eric Gordon	July 6	Phoenix Suns	Los Angeles Clippers (waived on June 28)	
Jeff Green	July 6	Houston Rockets	Denver Nuggets	
Rui Hachimura (RFA)	July 6	Los Angeles Lakers		
Jaxson Hayes	July 6	Los Angeles Lakers	New Orleans Pelicans	
Justin Holiday	July 6	Denver Nuggets	Dallas Mavericks	
Ty Jerome	July 6	Cleveland Cavaliers	Golden State Warriors (previously on a two-way contract)	
Cameron Johnson (RFA)	July 6	Brooklyn Nets		
Herbert Jones** (RFA)	July 6	New Orleans Pelicans		
Cory Joseph	July 6	Golden State Warriors	Detroit Pistons	
Jock Landale	July 6	Houston Rockets	Phoenix Suns	
Caris LeVert	July 6	Cleveland Cavaliers		
Brook Lopez	July 6	Milwaukee Bucks		
Robin Lopez	July 6	Milwaukee Bucks	Cleveland Cavaliers	
Kevin Love	July 6	Miami Heat		
Jalen McDaniels	July 6	Toronto Raptors	Philadelphia 76ers	
Khris Middleton*	July 6	Milwaukee Bucks		
Georges Niang	July 6	Cleveland Cavaliers	Philadelphia 76ers	
Mason Plumlee	July 6	Los Angeles Clippers		
Jakob Pöltl	July 6	Toronto Raptors		
Taurean Prince	July 6	Los Angeles Lakers	Minnesota Timberwolves (waived on June 28)	
Austin Reaves (RFA)	July 6	Los Angeles Lakers		
Cam Reddish	July 6	Los Angeles Lakers	Portland Trail Blazers	
Max Strus	July 6	Cleveland Cavaliers	Miami Heat	
Jacob Toppin	July 6	New York Knicks	Kentucky Wildcats (undrafted in 2023)	
Gabe Vincent	July 6	Los Angeles Lakers	Miami Heat	
Russell Westbrook	July 6	Los Angeles Clippers		
Cody Zeller	July 6	New Orleans Pelicans	Miami Heat	
A. J. Green (RFA)	July 7	Milwaukee Bucks (previously on a two-way contract)		
Joe Ingles	July 7	Orlando Magic	Milwaukee Bucks	
Kyrie Irving	July 7	Dallas Mavericks		
Kyle Kuzma*	July 7	Washington Wizards		
Damion Lee	July 7	Phoenix Suns		
Trey Lyles	July 7	Sacramento Kings		
D'Angelo Russell	July 7	Los Angeles Lakers		
Fred VanVleet*	July 7	Houston Rockets	Toronto Raptors	
Coby White (RFA)	July 7	Chicago Bulls		
Dillon Brooks	July 8	Houston Rockets	Memphis Grizzlies	
Troy Brown Jr.	July 8	Minnesota Timberwolves	Los Angeles Lakers	
Jae Crowder	July 8	Milwaukee Bucks		
Donte DiVincenzo*	July 8	New York Knicks	Golden State Warriors	
Draymond Green*	July 8	Golden State Warriors		
Shake Milton	July 8	Minnesota Timberwolves	Philadelphia 76ers	
Dennis Smith Jr.	July 8	Brooklyn Nets	Charlotte Hornets	
Nickeil Alexander-Walker	July 9	Minnesota Timberwolves		
Mo Bamba	July 9	Philadelphia 76ers	Los Angeles Lakers (waived on June 29)	
Patrick Beverley	July 9	Philadelphia 76ers	Chicago Bulls	
Jerami Grant	July 9	Portland Trail Blazers		
Alex Len	July 9	Sacramento Kings		
Dwight Powell	July 9	Dallas Mavericks		
Jevon Carter*	July 10	Chicago Bulls	Milwaukee Bucks	
Aaron Holiday	July 10	Houston Rockets	Atlanta Hawks	
Matisse Thybulle (RFA)	July 10	Portland Trail Blazers		
Lonnie Walker IV	July 10	Brooklyn Nets	Los Angeles Lakers	
Josh Okogie	July 11	Phoenix Suns		
Moritz Wagner	July 11	Orlando Magic		
Grant Williams (RFA)	July 11	Dallas Mavericks	Boston Celtics	
Paul Reed (RFA)	July 12	Philadelphia 76ers		
Dario Šarić^{R}	July 12	Golden State Warriors	Oklahoma City Thunder	
Dennis Schröder	July 12	Toronto Raptors	Los Angeles Lakers	
Seth Curry	July 14	Dallas Mavericks	Brooklyn Nets	
Dante Exum	July 14	Dallas Mavericks	Partizan Mozzart Bet (Serbia)	
Torrey Craig	July 15	Chicago Bulls	Phoenix Suns	
Jazian Gortman	July 15	Milwaukee Bucks	YNG Dreamers (Overtime Elite; undrafted in 2023)	
Darius Bazley	July 16	Brooklyn Nets	Phoenix Suns	
Reggie Jackson	July 16	Denver Nuggets		
Dalano Banton	July 17	Boston Celtics	Toronto Raptors	
Armaan Franklin	July 17	Denver Nuggets	Virginia Cavaliers (undrafted in 2023)	
Andrew Funk	July 17	Denver Nuggets	Penn State Nittany Lions (undrafted in 2023)	
Montrezl Harrell	July 17	Philadelphia 76ers		
Ömer Yurtseven	July 17	Utah Jazz	Miami Heat	
Bol Bol	July 18	Phoenix Suns	Orlando Magic (waived on July 4)	
Tre Jones (RFA)	July 18	San Antonio Spurs		
DeAndre Jordan	July 20	Denver Nuggets		
Jack White	July 20	Oklahoma City Thunder	Denver Nuggets (previously on a two-way contract)	
Wesley Matthews	July 21	Atlanta Hawks	Milwaukee Bucks	
Nerlens Noel	July 21	Sacramento Kings	Brooklyn Nets	
Ayo Dosunmu (RFA)	July 22	Chicago Bulls		
Jeff Dowtin (RFA)	July 22	Toronto Raptors (previously on a two-way contract)		
Tosan Evbuomwan	July 25	Detroit Pistons	Princeton Tigers (undrafted in 2023)	
Sandro Mamukelashvili	July 27	San Antonio Spurs		
Thanasis Antetokounmpo	July 28	Milwaukee Bucks		
Joshua Obiesie	July 28	Houston Rockets	Fraport Skyliners (Germany)	
Duane Washington Jr.	July 29	New York Knicks (waived on July 24; previously on a two-way contract)		
Mouhamadou Gueye	July 31	Toronto Raptors	Texas Legends (NBA G League)	
Kevin Obanor	July 31	Toronto Raptors	Texas Tech Red Raiders (undrafted in 2023)	
Garrett Temple	July 31	Toronto Raptors	New Orleans Pelicans (waived on July 5)	
Buddy Boeheim^{R}	August 1	Detroit Pistons (previously on a two-way contract)		
Nate Hinton	August 1	Houston Rockets	Cleveland Charge (NBA G League)	
Matthew Mayer	August 1	Houston Rockets	Illinois Fighting Illini (undrafted in 2023)	
Nate Williams	August 1	Houston Rockets	Portland Trail Blazers (waived on July 28)	
Dmytro Skapintsev	August 2	New York Knicks	Westchester Knicks (NBA G League)	
Souley Boum	August 3	Denver Nuggets	Xavier Musketeers (undrafted in 2023)	
Obadiah Noel	August 3	New York Knicks	Westchester Knicks (NBA G League)	
Trendon Watford	August 3	Brooklyn Nets	Portland Trail Blazers (waived on June 30)	
Frank Ntilikina	August 5	Charlotte Hornets	Dallas Mavericks	
Stanley Umude	August 7	Detroit Pistons	Motor City Cruise (NBA G League)	
Neemias Queta (RFA)	August 8	Sacramento Kings (previously on a two-way contract)		
Justin Champagnie	August 11	Miami Heat	Boston Celtics (waived on July 31)	
Caleb Daniels	August 11	Miami Heat	Villanova Wildcats (undrafted in 2023)	
Brandon McCoy	August 11	Miami Heat	Sioux Falls Skyforce (NBA G League)	
Drew Peterson	August 11	Miami Heat	USC Trojans (undrafted in 2023)	
Cole Swider	August 11	Miami Heat	Los Angeles Lakers (waived on July 26; previously on a two-way contract)	
Alondes Williams	August 11	Miami Heat	Long Island Nets (NBA G League)	
Javonte Smart	August 13	Philadelphia 76ers	Birmingham Squadron (NBA G League)	
Greg Brown III	August 14	Dallas Mavericks	Ontario Clippers (NBA G League)	
Terry Taylor (RFA)	August 14	Chicago Bulls (previously on a two-way contract)		
Jordan Walker	August 14	Dallas Mavericks	UAB Blazers (undrafted in 2023)	
Joe Wieskamp	August 14	Dallas Mavericks	Toronto Raptors (waived on July 17)	
Derrick Jones Jr.*	August 18	Dallas Mavericks	Chicago Bulls	
Moses Brown	August 22	Portland Trail Blazers	Brooklyn Nets	
Drew Timme	August 25	Milwaukee Bucks	Gonzaga Bulldogs (undrafted in 2023)	
Romeo Langford	August 29	Utah Jazz	San Antonio Spurs	
Nick Ongenda	August 29	Utah Jazz	DePaul Blue Demons (undrafted in 2023)	
P. J. Washington (RFA)	August 29	Charlotte Hornets		
Taevion Kinsey	August 30	Utah Jazz	Marshall Thundering Herd (undrafted in 2023)	
Alex Antetokounmpo	August 31	Milwaukee Bucks	Wisconsin Herd (NBA G League)	
Shaquille Harrison	August 31	Memphis Grizzlies	Los Angeles Lakers (waived on June 29)	
Sviatoslav Mykhailiuk	August 31	Boston Celtics	Charlotte Hornets	
JaVale McGee	September 2	Sacramento Kings	Dallas Mavericks (waived on August 29)	
Iverson Molinar	September 2	Milwaukee Bucks	Wisconsin Herd (NBA G League)	
Angelo Allegri	September 5	Charlotte Hornets	Eastern Washington Eagles (undrafted in 2023)	
Marques Bolden	September 5	Milwaukee Bucks	Salt Lake City Stars (NBA G League)	
Nathan Mensah	September 5	Charlotte Hornets	San Diego State Aztecs (undrafted in 2023)	
Trevon Scott	September 5	Charlotte Hornets	Calgary Surge (Canada)	
Jaylen Sims	September 5	Charlotte Hornets	Greensboro Swarm (NBA G League)	
Charlie Brown Jr.	September 6	New York Knicks	Delaware Blue Coats (NBA G League)	
Harry Giles	September 6	Brooklyn Nets	Agua Caliente Clippers (NBA G League)	
Christian Wood	September 6	Los Angeles Lakers	Dallas Mavericks	
Damion Baugh	September 7	Los Angeles Lakers	TCU Horned Frogs (undrafted in 2023)	
Bryce Hamilton	September 7	Los Angeles Lakers	South Bay Lakers (NBA G League)	
Max Heidegger	September 7	Chicago Bulls	Cazoo Baskonia (Spain)	
Quenton Jackson	September 7	Chicago Bulls	Washington Wizards (waived on July 24; previously on a two-way contract)	
Scotty Pippen Jr.	September 7	Los Angeles Lakers (previously on a two-way contract)		
Vincent Valerio-Bodon	September 7	Los Angeles Lakers	Soproni KC (Hungary; undrafted in 2023)	
Taylor Funk	September 8	Boston Celtics	Utah State Aggies (undrafted in 2023)	
Skal Labissière	September 8	Sacramento Kings	Grises de Humacao (Puerto Rico)	
David Duke Jr.	September 11	Philadelphia 76ers	Brooklyn Nets	
Sharife Cooper	September 12	Cleveland Cavaliers	Cleveland Charge (NBA G League)	
Henri Drell	September 12	Chicago Bulls	Chorale Roanne (France)	
Jordan Ford	September 12	Sacramento Kings	Stockton Kings (NBA G League)	
Pete Nance	September 12	Cleveland Cavaliers	North Carolina Tar Heels (undrafted in 2023)	
Justin Powell	September 12	Cleveland Cavaliers	Washington State Cougars (undrafted in 2023)	
Trevelin Queen	September 12	Orlando Magic	Indiana Pacers (waived on March 29; previously on a two-way contract)	
Zavier Simpson	September 12	Detroit Pistons	Grises de Humacao (Puerto Rico)	
Tristan Thompson	September 12	Cleveland Cavaliers	Los Angeles Lakers	
Brandon Williams	September 12	Orlando Magic	College Park Skyhawks (NBA G League)	
Danny Green	September 13	Philadelphia 76ers	Cleveland Cavaliers	
Mac McClung	September 13	Orlando Magic	Philadelphia 76ers (previously on a two-way contract)	
Vít Krejčí	September 14	Minnesota Timberwolves	Atlanta Hawks (waived on August 16)	
Alex Morales	September 14	Orlando Magic	Osos de Manatí (Puerto Rico)	
Zhaire Smith	September 14	Cleveland Cavaliers	Memphis Hustle (NBA G League)	
Ryan Arcidiacono	September 15	New York Knicks	Portland Trail Blazers (waived on April 1)	
Taj Gibson	September 15	Washington Wizards		
Javante McCoy	September 15	San Antonio Spurs	South Bay Lakers (NBA G League)	
Dejan Vasiljevic	September 15	Washington Wizards	Diamond Valley Eagles (Australia)	
Markieff Morris	September 16	Dallas Mavericks		
Boban Marjanović^{R}	September 19	Houston Rockets		
Xavier Moon	September 19	Los Angeles Clippers (previously on a two-way contract)		
Jontay Porter	September 19	Detroit Pistons	Wisconsin Herd (NBA G League)	
Chance Comanche	September 20	Sacramento Kings	Portland Trail Blazers	
Jordan Hall	September 20	Brooklyn Nets	Austin Spurs (NBA G League)	
Keifer Sykes	September 20	Brooklyn Nets	Motor City Cruise (NBA G League)	
Chase Audige	September 21	Washington Wizards	Northwestern Wildcats (undrafted in 2023)	
Marcus Bagley	September 21	Philadelphia 76ers	Arizona State Sun Devils (undrafted in 2023)	
Dexter Dennis	September 21	Dallas Mavericks	Texas A&M Aggies (undrafted in 2023)	
Daishen Nix	September 21	Minnesota Timberwolves	Houston Rockets (waived on June 29)	
Deonte Burton	September 22	Sacramento Kings	Stockton Kings (NBA G League)	
Pedro Bradshaw	September 25	Indiana Pacers	Fort Wayne Mad Ants (NBA G League)	
Kyler Edwards	September 25	Brooklyn Nets	Calgary Surge (Canada)	
Trevor Keels	September 25	Minnesota Timberwolves	New York Knicks (waived on July 26; previously on a two-way contract)	
Chris Silva	September 25	Atlanta Hawks	College Park Skyhawks (NBA G League)	
Lamar Stevens	September 25	Boston Celtics	San Antonio Spurs (waived on July 17)	
Craig Sword	September 25	Indiana Pacers	Spartans Distrito Capital (Venezuela)	
Brodric Thomas	September 25	Los Angeles Clippers	Boston Celtics (waived on October 12)	
Scottie Lindsey	September 26	Brooklyn Nets	Maine Celtics (NBA G League)	
Kelly Oubre Jr.	September 26	Philadelphia 76ers	Charlotte Hornets	
Brandon Slater	September 26	Boston Celtics	Villanova Wildcats (undrafted in 2023)	
Jordan Bell	September 27	Indiana Pacers	Guangzhou Loong Lions (China)	
Devin Cannady	September 27	New Orleans Pelicans	South Bay Lakers (NBA G League)	
Cheick Diallo	September 27	Miami Heat	Cangrejeros de Santurce (Puerto Rico)	
Jon Elmore	September 27	Miami Heat	Sioux Falls Skyforce (NBA G League)	
RaiQuan Gray	September 27	San Antonio Spurs	Brooklyn Nets (waived on July 18; previously on a two-way contract)	
Tyrese Martin	September 27	Minnesota Timberwolves	Atlanta Hawks (waived on July 21)	
Elfrid Payton	September 27	Indiana Pacers	Osos de Manatí (Puerto Rico)	
Jordan Schakel	September 27	Boston Celtics	Santa Cruz Warriors (NBA G League)	
Kendric Davis	September 28	Golden State Warriors	Memphis Tigers (undrafted in 2023)	
Rudy Gay	September 28	Golden State Warriors	Oklahoma City Thunder (waived on July 20)	
Javan Johnson	September 28	Golden State Warriors	DePaul Blue Demons (undrafted in 2023)	
Jayce Johnson	September 28	Golden State Warriors	Santa Cruz Warriors (NBA G League)	
Rodney McGruder^{R}	September 28	Golden State Warriors	Detroit Pistons	
Donovan Williams	September 28	Golden State Warriors	Atlanta Hawks (waived on June 26; previously on a two-way contract)	
D. J. Wilson	September 28	Orlando Magic	Lakeland Magic (NBA G League)	
James Akinjo	September 29	Sacramento Kings	Westchester Knicks (NBA G League)	
Malcolm Hill	September 29	New Orleans Pelicans	Birmingham Squadron (NBA G League)	
R. J. Hunter	September 29	Charlotte Hornets	Sydney Kings (Australia)	
Trey Jemison	September 29	New Orleans Pelicans	UAB Blazers (undrafted in 2023)	
Jarkel Joiner	September 29	Atlanta Hawks	NC State Wolfpack (undrafted in 2023)	
Tevian Jones	September 29	New Orleans Pelicans	Southern Utah Thunderbirds (undrafted in 2023)	
Darryl Morsell	September 29	Toronto Raptors	Raptors 905 (NBA G League)	
Landers Nolley II	September 29	New Orleans Pelicans	Cincinnati Bearcats (undrafted in 2023)	
Jaylen Nowell	September 29	Sacramento Kings	Minnesota Timberwolves	
Liam Robbins	September 29	New Orleans Pelicans	Vanderbilt Commodores (undrafted in 2023)	
DJ Steward	September 29	Boston Celtics	Vancouver Bandits (Canada)	
Edmond Sumner	September 29	Charlotte Hornets	Brooklyn Nets (waived on July 15)	
Keaton Wallace	September 29	Atlanta Hawks	Ontario Clippers (NBA G League)	
Charles Bediako	September 30	San Antonio Spurs	Alabama Crimson Tide (undrafted in 2023)	
Matthew Hurt	September 30	Memphis Grizzlies	Memphis Hustle (NBA G League)	
Makur Maker	September 30	Toronto Raptors	Capital City Go-Go (NBA G League)	
Mychal Mulder	September 30	Memphis Grizzlies	Sioux Falls Skyforce (NBA G League)	
Jules Bernard	October 1	Washington Wizards	Capital City Go-Go (NBA G League)	
Antoine Davis	October 1	Portland Trail Blazers	Detroit Mercy Titans (undrafted in 2023)	
Ashton Hagans	October 1	Portland Trail Blazers	Greensboro Swarm (NBA G League)	
Kevin Knox II**	October 1	Portland Trail Blazers		
Jeremy Lamb	October 1	Sacramento Kings		
Cameron Payne	October 1	Milwaukee Bucks	San Antonio Spurs (waived on September 11)	
Bryson Williams	October 1	Los Angeles Clippers	JL Bourg (France)	
Kylor Kelley	October 2	Boston Celtics	Calgary Surge (Canada)	
Justin Minaya	October 2	Portland Trail Blazers		
Duop Reath	October 2	Portland Trail Blazers	Al Riyadi Beirut (Lebanon)	
Malachi Smith	October 2	Portland Trail Blazers	Gonzaga Bulldogs (undrafted in 2023)	
Wenyen Gabriel	October 3	Boston Celtics	Los Angeles Lakers	
Reggie Bullock	October 4	Houston Rockets	San Antonio Spurs (waived on September 30)	
Kameron Hankerson	October 6	Brooklyn Nets	Long Island Nets (NBA G League)	
Trey McGowens	October 6	Brooklyn Nets	Long Island Nets (NBA G League)	
George Conditt IV	October 9	Portland Trail Blazers	Gigantes de Carolina (Puerto Rico)	
Nate Darling	October 9	Los Angeles Clippers	Ontario Clippers (NBA G League)	
Brandon Randolph	October 10	Atlanta Hawks	Austin Spurs (NBA G League)	
Erik Stevenson	October 10	San Antonio Spurs	West Virginia Mountaineers (undrafted in 2023)	
Paul Watson	October 10	San Antonio Spurs	Oklahoma City Thunder (waived on February 10, 2022)	
Michael Devoe	October 11	Utah Jazz	Ontario Clippers (NBA G League)	
Michael Foster Jr.	October 11	Washington Wizards	Delaware Blue Coats (NBA G League)	
Keshawn Justice	October 11	Utah Jazz	Santa Clara Broncos (undrafted in 2023)	
Jalen Crutcher	October 12	New Orleans Pelicans	Greensboro Swarm (NBA G League)	
Amida Brimah	October 13	Denver Nuggets	JL Bourg (France)	
Miye Oni	October 13	Orlando Magic	London Lions (Great Britain)	
Jamorko Pickett	October 13	Denver Nuggets	Cleveland Charge (NBA G League)	
David Singleton	October 13	Atlanta Hawks	UCLA Bruins (undrafted in 2023)	
Au'Diese Toney	October 13	Denver Nuggets	Lakeland Magic (NBA G League)	
Timmy Allen	October 16	Memphis Grizzlies	Texas Longhorns (undrafted in 2023)	
Izaiah Brockington	October 16	New Orleans Pelicans	Birmingham Squadron (NBA G League)	
Yuri Collins	October 16	Golden State Warriors	Saint Louis Billikens (undrafted in 2023)	
Derrick Favors	October 16	Chicago Bulls	Atlanta Hawks (previously on a 10-day contract)	
Javonte Green	October 16	Golden State Warriors	Chicago Bulls	
Tazé Moore	October 16	Dallas Mavericks	Texas Legends (NBA G League)	
Jason Preston	October 16	Memphis Grizzlies	Los Angeles Clippers (waived on October 1)	
Kahlil Whitney	October 16	Chicago Bulls	Rio Grande Valley Vipers (NBA G League)	
Kyle Mangas	October 17	Indiana Pacers	Šiauliai-7bet (Lithuania)	
Darius McGhee	October 17	Indiana Pacers	Liberty Flames (undrafted in 2023)	
Reid Travis	October 17	Indiana Pacers	Shimane Susanoo Magic (Japan)	
Adonis Arms	October 18	Memphis Grizzlies	Memphis Hustle (NBA G League)	
D. J. Carton	October 18	Minnesota Timberwolves	Iowa Wolves (NBA G League)	
Kennedy Chandler	October 18	Brooklyn Nets	Memphis Grizzlies (waived on April 8)	
Patrick Gardner	October 18	Brooklyn Nets	Marist Red Foxes (undrafted in 2023)	
David Johnson	October 18	Memphis Grizzlies	Raptors 905 (NBA G League)	
Louis King	October 18	Los Angeles Lakers	Philadelphia 76ers (previously on a two-way contract)	
Hunter Maldonado	October 18	Oklahoma City Thunder	Wyoming Cowboys (undrafted in 2023)	
Daeqwon Plowden	October 18	Orlando Magic	Birmingham Squadron (NBA G League)	
KJ Williams	October 18	Oklahoma City Thunder	LSU Tigers (undrafted in 2023)	
Bryce Wills	October 18	Denver Nuggets	Grand Rapids Gold (NBA G League)	
Tony Bradley	October 19	Dallas Mavericks	Chicago Bulls (waived on February 21)	
Kihei Clark	October 19	Milwaukee Bucks	Virginia Cavaliers (undrafted in 2023)	
Mamadi Diakite	October 19	New York Knicks	Cleveland Cavaliers (previously on a two-way contract)	
Devon Dotson	October 19	Washington Wizards	Capital City Go-Go (NBA G League)	
Adam Flagler	October 19	Oklahoma City Thunder	Baylor Bears (undrafted in 2023)	
Brandon Goodwin	October 19	New York Knicks	Cleveland Cavaliers (previously on a two-way contract)	
Dane Goodwin	October 19	Sacramento Kings	Notre Dame Fighting Irish (undrafted in 2023)	
Elijah Hughes	October 19	Milwaukee Bucks	Manisa BB (Turkey)	
Caleb McConnell	October 19	Oklahoma City Thunder	Rutgers Scarlet Knights (undrafted in 2023)	
Glenn Robinson III	October 19	Milwaukee Bucks	Sacramento Kings	
Jake Stephens	October 19	Sacramento Kings	Chattanooga Mocs (undrafted in 2023)	
Quinndary Weatherspoon	October 19	Los Angeles Lakers	Tianjin Pioneers (China)	
James Banks III	October 20	Boston Celtics	Texas Legends (NBA G League)	
Terrell Brown Jr.	October 20	Charlotte Hornets	Memphis Hustle (NBA G League)	
Joey Hauser	October 20	Los Angeles Clippers	Utah Jazz (waived on October 12; previously on a two-way contract)	
Reginald Kissoonlal	October 20	Boston Celtics	Maine Celtics (NBA G League)	
Jahmi'us Ramsey	October 20	Oklahoma City Thunder	Oklahoma City Blue (NBA G League)	
Jaden Shackelford	October 20	Oklahoma City Thunder	Oklahoma City Blue (NBA G League)	
Justise Winslow	October 20	Toronto Raptors	Portland Trail Blazers	
Brian Bowen	October 21	Minnesota Timberwolves	Iowa Wolves (NBA G League)	
Jared Brownridge	October 21	Philadelphia 76ers	Delaware Blue Coats (NBA G League)	
Javonte Cooke	October 21	Minnesota Timberwolves	Iowa Wolves (NBA G League)	
Hamidou Diallo^{R}	October 21	Washington Wizards	Detroit Pistons	
Rob Edwards	October 21	Cleveland Cavaliers	BG Göttingen (Germany)	
Malik Fitts	October 21	Washington Wizards	Ontario Clippers (NBA G League)	
Aleem Ford	October 21	Cleveland Cavaliers	Leones de Ponce (Puerto Rico)	
Treveon Graham	October 21	Detroit Pistons	Montreal Alliance (Canada)	
Gabe Kalscheur	October 21	Washington Wizards	Iowa State Cyclones (undrafted in 2023)	
Isaiah Miller	October 21	Utah Jazz	Salt Lake City Stars (NBA G League)	
David Nwaba	October 21	Detroit Pistons	Motor City Cruise (NBA G League)	
Nate Roberts	October 21	Detroit Pistons	Motor City Cruise (NBA G League; undrafted in 2023)	
Isaiah Roby	October 21	New York Knicks (waived on October 18)		
Devontae Shuler	October 21	Cleveland Cavaliers	Cleveland Charge (NBA G League)	
Dru Smith	October 21	Miami Heat (previously on a two-way contract)		
Ryan Turell	October 21	Detroit Pistons	Motor City Cruise (NBA G League)	
Ish Wainright^{C}	October 21	Portland Trail Blazers (claimed off waivers)	Phoenix Suns (waived on October 19)	
Dylan Windler	October 21	New York Knicks (previously on a two-way contract)		
Omari Moore	October 22	Toronto Raptors	Milwaukee Bucks (waived on October 19)	
Matt Ryan^{C}	October 22	New Orleans Pelicans (claimed off waivers)	Minnesota Timberwolves (waived on October 20; previously on a two-way contract)	
Ish Smith	October 24	Charlotte Hornets	Denver Nuggets	
Bismack Biyombo	November 1	Memphis Grizzlies	Phoenix Suns	
Kevin Knox II	November 8	Detroit Pistons	Rip City Remix (NBA G League)	
Skylar Mays	November 12	Portland Trail Blazers (previously on a two-way contract)		
Joshua Primo	November 15	Los Angeles Clippers (previously on a two-way contract)		
Daniel Theis	November 17	Los Angeles Clippers	Indiana Pacers (waived on November 15)	
Shaquille Harrison	November 24	Memphis Grizzlies (signed to a 10-day contract)	South Bay Lakers (NBA G League)	
Jaylen Nowell	November 24	Memphis Grizzlies (signed to a 10-day contract)	Stockton Kings (NBA G League)	
Jaylen Nowell	December 4	Memphis Grizzlies (signed to a second 10-day contract)		
Taj Gibson	December 15	New York Knicks	Washington Wizards (waived on October 23)	
James Johnson	December 15	Indiana Pacers		
Juan Toscano-Anderson	December 15	Sacramento Kings	Mexico City Capitanes (NBA G League)	
Théo Maledon^{C}	December 17	Phoenix Suns (claimed off waivers)	Charlotte Hornets (waived on December 14; previously on a two-way contract)	
Hamidou Diallo	January 9	Washington Wizards (signed to a 10-day contract)	Capital City Go-Go (NBA G League)	
Juan Toscano-Anderson	January 9	Sacramento Kings (signed to a 10-day contract; previously waived on January 7)		
Vince Williams Jr.	January 10	Memphis Grizzlies (previously on a two-way contract)		
Pete Nance	January 18	Cleveland Cavaliers (signed to a 10-day contract)	Cleveland Charge (NBA G League)	
James Johnson	January 19	Indiana Pacers (signed to a 10-day contract; previously waived on January 17)		
Tazé Moore	January 20	Portland Trail Blazers (signed to a 10-day contract)	Rip City Remix (NBA G League)	
Trey Jemison	January 20	Washington Wizards (signed to a 10-day contract)	Birmingham Squadron (NBA G League)	
Malcolm Hill	January 27	New Orleans Pelicans (signed to a 10-day contract)	Birmingham Squadron (NBA G League)	
Matthew Hurt	January 29	Memphis Grizzlies (signed to a 10-day contract)	Memphis Hustle (NBA G League)	
James Johnson	January 29	Indiana Pacers (signed to a second 10-day contract)		
Tosan Evbuomwan	January 30	Memphis Grizzlies (signed to a 10-day contract)	Motor City Cruise (NBA G League)	
Taj Gibson	January 30	New York Knicks (signed to a 10-day contract; previously waived on January 7)		
Trey Jemison	January 30	Memphis Grizzlies (signed to a 10-day contract)	Washington Wizards (10-day contract ended on January 30)	
Ashton Hagans	February 8	Portland Trail Blazers (signed to a 10-day contract)	Rip City Remix (NBA G League)	
James Johnson	February 8	Indiana Pacers (signed for the rest of the season)		
Keon Ellis	February 9	Sacramento Kings (previously on a two-way contract)		
GG Jackson	February 9	Memphis Grizzlies (previously on a two-way contract)		
Lindy Waters III	February 9	Oklahoma City Thunder (previously on a two-way contract)		
Bismack Biyombo	February 10	Oklahoma City Thunder	Memphis Grizzlies (waived on January 10)	
Spencer Dinwiddie	February 10	Los Angeles Lakers	Toronto Raptors (waived on February 8)	
Taj Gibson	February 10	New York Knicks (signed to a second 10-day contract)		
Mouhamadou Gueye	February 10	Toronto Raptors (signed to a 10-day contract)	Raptors 905 (NBA G League)	
Justise Winslow	February 10	Toronto Raptors (signed to a 10-day contract)	Raptors 905 (NBA G League)	
Zhaire Smith	February 11	Cleveland Cavaliers (signed to a 10-day contract)	Cleveland Charge (NBA G League)	
Tosan Evbuomwan	February 13	Detroit Pistons (signed to a 10-day contract)	Motor City Cruise (NBA G League)	
Jordan Goodwin	February 13	Memphis Grizzlies (signed to a 10-day contract)	Brooklyn Nets (waived on February 9)	
Kyle Lowry	February 13	Philadelphia 76ers	Charlotte Hornets (waived on February 11)	
Craig Porter Jr.	February 14	Cleveland Cavaliers (previously on a two-way contract)		
Duop Reath	February 16	Portland Trail Blazers (previously on a two-way contract)		
Jeremiah Robinson-Earl	February 17	New Orleans Pelicans (previously on a two-way contract)		
Delon Wright	February 18	Miami Heat	Washington Wizards (waived on February 16)	
Darius Bazley	February 20	Philadelphia 76ers (signed to a 10-day contract)	Delaware Blue Coats (NBA G League)	
Marques Bolden	February 20	Charlotte Hornets (signed to a 10-day contract)	Wisconsin Herd (NBA G League)	
Thaddeus Young	February 20	Phoenix Suns	Brooklyn Nets (waived on February 8)	
D. J. Carton	February 21	Toronto Raptors (signed to a 10-day contract)	Iowa Wolves (NBA G League)	
Danilo Gallinari	February 21	Milwaukee Bucks	Detroit Pistons (waived on February 9)	
Justin Champagnie	February 22	Washington Wizards (signed to a 10-day contract)	Sioux Falls Skyforce (NBA G League)	
Jalen Crutcher	February 22	New Orleans Pelicans (signed to a 10-day contract)	Birmingham Squadron (NBA G League)	
Justin Jackson	February 22	Minnesota Timberwolves (signed to a 10-day contract)	Texas Legends (NBA G League)	
DaQuan Jeffries	February 22	New York Knicks (signed to a 10-day contract)	Westchester Knicks (NBA G League)	
Lester Quiñones	February 22	Golden State Warriors (previously on a two-way contract)		
Jacob Toppin	February 22	New York Knicks (signed to a 10-day contract; previously on a two-way contract)		
Stanley Umude	February 23	Detroit Pistons (previously on a two-way contract)		
Onuralp Bitim	February 24	Chicago Bulls (previously on a two-way contract)		
Sharife Cooper	February 26	Cleveland Cavaliers (signed to a 10-day contract)	Cleveland Charge (NBA G League)	
Matthew Hurt	February 26	Memphis Grizzlies (signed to a second 10-day contract)	Memphis Hustle (NBA G League)	
Aleksej Pokuševski	February 28	Charlotte Hornets	Oklahoma City Thunder (waived on February 23)	
Trent Forrest	February 29	Atlanta Hawks (previously on a two-way contract)		
Javon Freeman-Liberty	March 1	Toronto Raptors (previously on a two-way contract)		
Eugene Omoruyi	March 1	Washington Wizards (previously on a two-way contract)		
Jalen Wilson	March 1	Brooklyn Nets (previously on a two-way contract)		
Dominick Barlow	March 2	San Antonio Spurs (previously on a two-way contract)		
Mike Muscala	March 2	Oklahoma City Thunder	Detroit Pistons (waived on February 28)	
Izaiah Brockington	March 3	New Orleans Pelicans (signed to a 10-day contract)	Birmingham Squadron (NBA G League)	
R. J. Hampton	March 3	Washington Wizards (signed to a 10-day contract)	Capital City Go-Go (NBA G League)	
Kendall Brown	March 4	Indiana Pacers (previously on a two-way contract)		
A. J. Lawson	March 4	Dallas Mavericks (previously on a two-way contract)		
Jahmi'us Ramsey	March 4	Toronto Raptors (signed to a 10-day contract)	Oklahoma City Blue (NBA G League)	
Shake Milton	March 5	New York Knicks	Detroit Pistons (waived on March 1)	
Taj Gibson	March 6	Detroit Pistons (signed to a 10-day contract)	New York Knicks (10-day contract ended on February 20)	
Patty Mills	March 6	Miami Heat	Atlanta Hawks (waived on February 29)	
T. J. Warren	March 6	Minnesota Timberwolves (signed to a 10-day contract)	Phoenix Suns	
Wenyen Gabriel	March 8	Memphis Grizzlies (signed to a 10-day contract)	Wisconsin Herd (NBA G League)	
Taevion Kinsey	March 9	Utah Jazz (signed to a 10-day contract)	Salt Lake City Stars (NBA G League)	
DeJon Jarreau	March 10	Memphis Grizzlies (signed to a 10-day contract)	Memphis Hustle (NBA G League)	
Kenneth Lofton Jr.	March 11	Utah Jazz	Philadelphia 76ers (waived on March 1; previously on a two-way contract)	
Darius Bazley	March 12	Utah Jazz	Delaware Blue Coats (NBA G League)	
Mamadi Diakite	March 14	New York Knicks (signed to a 10-day contract)	Westchester Knicks (NBA G League)	
DaQuan Jeffries	March 14	New York Knicks (signed to a second 10-day contract)	Westchester Knicks (NBA G League)	
Jahmi'us Ramsey	March 14	Toronto Raptors (signed to a second 10-day contract)		
Kai Jones	March 15	Philadelphia 76ers (signed to a 10-day contract)	Charlotte Hornets (waived on October 11)	
Taj Gibson	March 16	Detroit Pistons (signed for the rest of the season)		
T. J. Warren	March 16	Minnesota Timberwolves (signed to a second 10-day contract)		
Marcus Morris Sr.	March 18	Cleveland Cavaliers (signed to a 10-day contract)	San Antonio Spurs (waived on February 29)	
DeJon Jarreau	March 20	Memphis Grizzlies (signed to a second 10-day contract)		
Chimezie Metu	March 20	Detroit Pistons (signed to a 10-day contract)	Memphis Grizzlies (waived on February 9)	
Mãozinha Pereira	March 20	Memphis Grizzlies (signed to a 10-day contract)	Mexico City Capitanes (NBA G League)	
Isaiah Thomas	March 20	Phoenix Suns (signed to a 10-day contract)	Salt Lake City Stars (NBA G League)	
Javonte Green	March 23	Chicago Bulls (signed to a 10-day contract)	Santa Cruz Warriors (NBA G League)	
Kobi Simmons	March 24	Toronto Raptors (signed to a 10-day contract)	Raptors 905 (NBA G League)	
D. J. Wilson	March 24	Philadelphia 76ers (signed to a 10-day contract)	Osceola Magic (NBA G League)	
Mamadi Diakite	March 25	New York Knicks (signed for the rest of the season)		
DaQuan Jeffries	March 25	New York Knicks (signed for the rest of the season)		
T. J. Warren	March 27	Minnesota Timberwolves (signed for the rest of the season)		
Marcus Morris Sr.	March 29	Cleveland Cavaliers (signed for the rest of the season)		
Chimezie Metu	March 30	Detroit Pistons (signed for the rest of the season)		
Mãozinha Pereira	March 30	Memphis Grizzlies (signed to a second 10-day contract)		
Zavier Simpson	March 30	Memphis Grizzlies (signed to a 10-day contract)	Motor City Cruise (NBA G League)	
Isaiah Thomas	March 30	Phoenix Suns (signed to a second 10-day contract)		
Jaylen Nowell	April 3	Detroit Pistons (signed to a 10-day contract)	Stockton Kings (NBA G League)	
Malik Williams	April 3	Toronto Raptors (signed to a 10-day contract)	Sioux Falls Skyforce (NBA G League)	
Jeff Dowtin	April 4	Philadelphia 76ers (previously on a two-way contract)		
Luka Garza	April 4	Minnesota Timberwolves (previously on a two-way contract)		
Javonte Green	April 4	Chicago Bulls (signed for the rest of the season)		
Jared Butler	April 5	Washington Wizards (previously on a two-way contract)		
Timmy Allen	April 6	Memphis Grizzlies (signed to a 10-day contract)	Memphis Hustle (NBA G League)	
Neemias Queta	April 8	Boston Celtics (previously on a two-way contract)		
Zavier Simpson	April 9	Memphis Grizzlies (signed to a second 10-day contract)		
Isaiah Thomas	April 9	Phoenix Suns (signed for the rest of the season)		
Jack White	April 9	Memphis Grizzlies (signed to a 10-day contract)	South Bay Lakers (NBA G League)	
Ricky Council IV	April 13	Philadelphia 76ers (previously on a two-way contract)		
Jaylen Nowell	April 13	Detroit Pistons (signed to a second 10-day contract)		
Matt Ryan	April 13	New Orleans Pelicans (previously on a two-way contract)		
Malik Williams	April 13	Toronto Raptors (Signed for the rest of the season)		
Usman Garuba	April 14	Golden State Warriors (previously on a two-way contract)		
Kai Jones	April 14	Los Angeles Clippers (signed for the rest of the season)	Philadelphia 76ers (10-day contract ended on March 25)	
Tazé Moore	April 14	Portland Trail Blazers (signed for the rest of the season)	Rip City Remix (NBA G League)	
Timmy Allen			Memphis Grizzlies (10-day contract ended on April 16)	
D. J. Augustin^{R}			Houston Rockets	
James Bouknight			Charlotte Hornets (waived on February 8)	
Bryn Forbes			Minnesota Timberwolves (waived on February 9, 2023)	
Rudy Gay			Golden State Warriors (waived on October 20)	
Danny Green			Philadelphia 76ers (waived on November 1)	
JaMychal Green			Golden State Warriors	
Ron Harper Jr.			Toronto Raptors (waived on December 8; previously on a two-way contract)	
Montrezl Harrell			Philadelphia 76ers (waived on October 23)	
Joe Harris			Detroit Pistons (waived on February 8)	
Killian Hayes			Detroit Pistons (waived on February 8)	
George Hill^{R}			Indiana Pacers	
Danuel House Jr.			Detroit Pistons (waived on February 8)	
Cory Joseph			Indiana Pacers (waived on February 8)	
Christian Koloko			Toronto Raptors (waived on January 17)	
Furkan Korkmaz			Indiana Pacers (waived on February 9)	
Meyers Leonard			Milwaukee Bucks	
Isaiah Livers			Washington Wizards (waived on April 5)	
Robin Lopez			Sacramento Kings (waived on February 8)	
Setric Millner Jr.			San Antonio Spurs (waived on September 30; previously on a two-way contract)	
Nerlens Noel			Sacramento Kings (waived on September 12)	
Jaylen Nowell			Detroit Pistons (10-day contract ended on April 23)	
Frank Ntilikina			Charlotte Hornets (waived on February 8)	
KZ Okpala			Sacramento Kings (waived on February 12, 2023)	
Victor Oladipo			Memphis Grizzlies (waived on February 8)	
Mãozinha Pereira			Memphis Grizzlies (10-day contract ended on April 9)	
Joshua Primo			Los Angeles Clippers (waived on April 13)	
Austin Rivers			Minnesota Timberwolves	
Jay Scrubb			Boston Celtics (waived on October 22; previously on a two-way contract)	
Kobi Simmons			Toronto Raptors (10-day contract ended on April 3)	
Zavier Simpson			Memphis Grizzlies (10-day contract ended on April 19)	
Dru Smith			Miami Heat (waived on March 6)	
Ish Smith			Charlotte Hornets (waived on February 8)	
Terry Taylor			Chicago Bulls (waived on April 4)	
John Wall			Houston Rockets (waived on February 12, 2023)	

* Player option
** Team option
*** Early termination option

=== Two-way contracts ===
Per recent NBA rules implemented as of the 2023–24 season, teams are permitted to have three two-way players on their roster at any given time, in addition to their 15-man regular season roster. A two-way player will provide services primarily to the team's G League affiliate, but can spend up to 50 days with the parent NBA team. Only players with four or fewer years of NBA experience are able to sign two-way contracts, which can be for either one season or two. Players entering training camp for a team have a chance to convert their training camp deal into a two-way contract if they prove themselves worthy enough for it. Teams also have the option to convert a two-way contract into a regular, minimum-salary NBA contract, at which point the player becomes a regular member of the parent NBA team. Two-way players are not eligible for NBA playoff rosters, so a team must convert any two-way players it wants to use in the playoffs, while waiving another player in the process.

Denotes players who were promoted to the main roster
Denotes players who were cut before season's end

Player	Date signed	Team	School / club team	Ref
Jamaree Bouyea	July 1	Miami Heat	Sioux Falls Skyforce (NBA G League)	
Ricky Council IV	July 1	Philadelphia 76ers	Arkansas Razorbacks (undrafted in 2023)	
Dru Smith	July 1	Miami Heat	Brooklyn Nets (previously on a two-way contract)	
Terquavion Smith	July 1	Philadelphia 76ers	NC State Wolfpack (undrafted in 2023)	
Malcolm Cazalon	July 2	Detroit Pistons	Mega MIS (Serbia; undrafted in 2023)	
Darius Days (RFA)	July 2	Houston Rockets (previously on a two-way contract)		
Keon Ellis (RFA)	July 2	Sacramento Kings (previously on a two-way contract)		
Trevor Hudgins (RFA)	July 2	Houston Rockets (previously on a two-way contract)		
Jared Rhoden (RFA)	July 2	Detroit Pistons (previously on a two-way contract)		
Jalen Slawson	July 2	Sacramento Kings	Furman Paladins	
Colin Castleton	July 3	Los Angeles Lakers	Florida Gators (undrafted in 2023)	
Luka Garza (RFA)	July 3	Minnesota Timberwolves (previously on a two-way contract)		
Joey Hauser	July 3	Utah Jazz	Michigan State Spartans (undrafted in 2023)	
D'Moi Hodge	July 3	Los Angeles Lakers	Missouri Tigers (undrafted in 2023)	
Jaylen Martin	July 3	New York Knicks	YNG Dreamerz (Overtime Elite; undrafted in 2023)	
Markquis Nowell	July 3	Toronto Raptors	Kansas State Wildcats (undrafted in 2023)	
Oscar Tshiebwe	July 3	Indiana Pacers	Kentucky Wildcats (undrafted in 2023)	
Isaiah Wong	July 3	Indiana Pacers	Miami Hurricanes	
Omari Moore	July 5	Milwaukee Bucks	San Jose Spartans (undrafted in 2023)	
Sir'Jabari Rice	July 5	San Antonio Spurs	Texas Longhorns (undrafted in 2023)	
Jalen Wilson	July 5	Brooklyn Nets	Kansas Jayhawks	
Ibou Badji (RFA)	July 6	Portland Trail Blazers (previously on a two-way contract)		
John Butler Jr. (RFA)	July 6	Portland Trail Blazers (previously on a two-way contract)		
Seth Lundy	July 6	Atlanta Hawks	Penn State Nittany	
Miles Norris	July 6	Atlanta Hawks	UC Santa Barbara Gauchos (undrafted in 2023)	
Emoni Bates	July 7	Cleveland Cavaliers	Eastern Michigan Eagles	
Jaylen Clark	July 7	Minnesota Timberwolves	UCLA Bruins	
Keyontae Johnson	July 7	Oklahoma City Thunder	Kansas State Wildcats	
Isaiah Mobley (RFA)	July 7	Cleveland Cavaliers (previously on a two-way contract)		
Craig Porter Jr.	July 7	Cleveland Cavaliers	Wichita State Shockers (undrafted in 2023)	
Trevor Keels (RFA)	July 8	New York Knicks (previously on a two-way contract)		
JD Davison (RFA)	July 9	Boston Celtics (previously on a two-way contract)		
Adama Sanogo	July 10	Chicago Bulls	UConn Huskies (undrafted in 2023)	
Eugene Omoruyi	July 12	Washington Wizards	Detroit Pistons (waived on July 1)	
Saben Lee (RFA)	July 13	Phoenix Suns (previously on a two-way contract)		
Amari Bailey	July 14	Charlotte Hornets	UCLA Bruins	
Moussa Diabaté (RFA)	July 14	Los Angeles Clippers (previously on a two-way contract)		
Mike Miles Jr.	July 14	Dallas Mavericks	TCU Horned Frogs (undrafted in 2023)	
Jay Scrubb	July 15	Boston Celtics	Orlando Magic (waived on June 5; previously on a two-way contract)	
Collin Gillespie (RFA)	July 17	Denver Nuggets (previously on a two-way contract)		
Ąžuolas Tubelis	July 17	Philadelphia 76ers	Arizona Wildcats (undrafted in 2023)	
Armoni Brooks	July 18	Brooklyn Nets	College Park Skyhawks (NBA G League)	
Jay Huff	July 18	Denver Nuggets	Washington Wizards (previously on a two-way contract)	
Braxton Key	July 18	Denver Nuggets	Vaqueros de Bayamón (Puerto Rico)	
Leaky Black	July 19	Charlotte Hornets	North Carolina Tar Heels (undrafted in 2023)	
Johnny Juzang	July 19	Utah Jazz (previously on a two-way contract)		
Admiral Schofield	July 20	Orlando Magic		
Nathan Knight	July 21	New York Knicks	Minnesota Timberwolves	
Javon Freeman-Liberty	July 22	Toronto Raptors	Windy City Bulls (NBA G League)	
Ron Harper Jr. (RFA)	July 22	Toronto Raptors (previously on a two-way contract)		
Lester Quiñones (RFA)	July 24	Golden State Warriors (previously on a two-way contract)		
Duane Washington Jr. (RFA)	July 24	New York Knicks (previously on a two-way contract)		
Onuralp Bitim	July 25	Chicago Bulls	Frutti Extra Bursaspor (Turkey)	
Kendall Brown (RFA)	July 25	Indiana Pacers (previously on a two-way contract)		
Alex Fudge	July 26	Los Angeles Lakers	Florida Gators (undrafted in 2023)	
Dominick Barlow (RFA)	July 27	San Antonio Spurs (previously on a two-way contract)		
Dylan Windler	July 27	New York Knicks	Cleveland Cavaliers	
Jared Butler	July 28	Washington Wizards	Oklahoma City Thunder (previously on a two-way contract)	
Jermaine Samuels	August 2	Houston Rockets	Fort Wayne Mad Ants (NBA G League)	
Jordan Miller	August 7	Los Angeles Clippers	Miami Hurricanes	
Udoka Azubuike	August 8	Phoenix Suns	Utah Jazz	
Jamal Cain (RFA)	August 11	Miami Heat (previously on a two-way contract)		
Lindy Waters III	August 18	Oklahoma City Thunder		
Olivier Sarr	August 21	Oklahoma City Thunder (previously on a two-way contract)		
TyTy Washington Jr.	August 29	Milwaukee Bucks	Oklahoma City Thunder (waived on August 18)	
GG Jackson	August 31	Memphis Grizzlies	South Carolina Gamecocks	
Trent Forrest (RFA)	September 12	Atlanta Hawks (previously on a two-way contract)		
Jordan Ford	September 15	Sacramento Kings		
Setric Millner Jr.	September 15	San Antonio Spurs	Toledo Rockets (undrafted in 2023)	
Neemias Queta	September 19	Boston Celtics	Sacramento Kings (waived on September 12)	
Usman Garuba	September 25	Golden State Warriors	Oklahoma City Thunder (waived on August 21)	
R. J. Hampton	September 27	Miami Heat	Detroit Pistons (waived on June 23)	
Matt Ryan (RFA)	September 28	Minnesota Timberwolves (previously on a two-way contract)		
Théo Maledon (RFA)	September 29	Charlotte Hornets (previously on a two-way contract)		
Joshua Primo	September 29	Los Angeles Clippers	San Antonio Spurs (waived on October 28)	
Jerome Robinson	September 29	Golden State Warriors	Santa Cruz Warriors (NBA G League)	
Kaiser Gates	September 30	New Orleans Pelicans	Long Island Nets (NBA G League)	
Skylar Mays	October 1	Portland Trail Blazers		
Josh Christopher	October 13	Utah Jazz	Memphis Grizzlies (waived on September 30)	
Daishen Nix	October 20	Minnesota Timberwolves		
Marques Bolden	October 21	Milwaukee Bucks		
Greg Brown III	October 21	Dallas Mavericks		
Charlie Brown Jr.	October 21	New York Knicks		
Dexter Dennis	October 21	Dallas Mavericks		
Justin Minaya	October 21	Portland Trail Blazers		
Trevelin Queen	October 21	Orlando Magic		
Javonte Smart	October 21	Philadelphia 76ers		
Cole Swider	October 21	Miami Heat		
Jacob Toppin	October 21	New York Knicks		
Nathan Knight	October 22	Boston Celtics	New York Knicks (waived on October 19; previously on a two-way contract)	
Matt Ryan	October 22	New Orleans Pelicans		
Charles Bediako	October 23	San Antonio Spurs		
John Butler Jr.	October 23	Washington Wizards	Portland Trail Blazers (waived on October 20; previously on a two-way contract)	
Nate Hinton	October 23	Houston Rockets (waived on October 21)		
Stanley Umude	October 23	Detroit Pistons		
Nate Williams	October 23	Houston Rockets		
Duop Reath	October 24	Portland Trail Blazers (waived on October 21)		
Duane Washington Jr.	October 24	New York Knicks (waived on October 21)		
Ricky Council IV	October 25	Philadelphia 76ers (waived on October 20; previously on a two-way contract)		
Keon Johnson	November 1	Brooklyn Nets	Phoenix Suns (waived on October 23)	
Jeremiah Robinson-Earl	November 3	New Orleans Pelicans	Houston Rockets (waived on October 23)	
Jamaree Bouyea	November 12	Portland Trail Blazers	Sioux Falls Skyforce (NBA G League)	
Xavier Moon	November 15	Los Angeles Clippers	Ontario Clippers (NBA G League)	
Ibou Badji	November 22	Portland Trail Blazers	Wisconsin Herd (NBA G League)	
Jaylen Martin	November 27	New York Knicks	Westchester Knicks (NBA G League)	
Jules Bernard	December 8	Washington Wizards	Capital City Go-Go (NBA G League)	
Jontay Porter	December 9	Toronto Raptors	Motor City Cruise (NBA G League)	
David Duke Jr.	December 14	San Antonio Spurs	Delaware Blue Coats (NBA G League)	
Nathan Mensah	December 14	Charlotte Hornets	Greensboro Swarm (NBA G League)	
Drew Peterson	December 14	Boston Celtics	Sioux Falls Skyforce (NBA G League)	
Henri Drell	December 16	Chicago Bulls	Windy City Bulls (NBA G League)	
Théo Maledon	December 17	Phoenix Suns		
Vít Krejčí	December 22	Atlanta Hawks	Iowa Wolves (NBA G League)	
Kenneth Lofton Jr.	December 23	Philadelphia 76ers	Memphis Grizzlies (waived on December 18)	
Dmytro Skapintsev	December 23	New York Knicks	Westchester Knicks (NBA G League)	
Brandon Williams	December 28	Dallas Mavericks	Osceola Magic (NBA G League)	
Mamadi Diakite	January 1	San Antonio Spurs	Westchester Knicks (NBA G League)	
Duane Washington Jr.	January 3	New York Knicks (waived on November 27; previously on a two-way contract)		
Dylan Windler	January 6	Los Angeles Lakers	Westchester Knicks (NBA G League)	
Skylar Mays	January 8	Los Angeles Lakers	Portland Trail Blazers (waived on January 6)	
Jason Preston	January 9	Utah Jazz	Memphis Hustle (NBA G League)	
Scotty Pippen Jr.	January 16	Memphis Grizzlies	South Bay Lakers (NBA G League)	
Trey Jemison	February 9	Memphis Grizzlies (10-day contract ended on February 9)		
Mason Jones	February 9	Sacramento Kings	Stockton Kings (NBA G League)	
Alondes Williams	February 9	Miami Heat	Sioux Falls Skyforce (NBA G League)	
Adam Flagler	February 12	Oklahoma City Thunder	Oklahoma City Blue (NBA G League)	
Pete Nance	February 19	Cleveland Cavaliers	Cleveland Charge (NBA G League)	
Jaylen Martin	February 21	Brooklyn Nets	Westchester Knicks (NBA G League)	
Ryan Rollins	February 21	Milwaukee Bucks	Washington Wizards (waived on January 8)	
Malcolm Hill	February 22	New Orleans Pelicans	Birmingham Squadron (NBA G League)	
Pat Spencer	February 22	Golden State Warriors	Santa Cruz Warriors (NBA G League)	
Buddy Boeheim	February 23	Detroit Pistons	Motor City Cruise (NBA G League)	
Tosan Evbuomwan	February 23	Detroit Pistons (10-day contract ended on February 23)		
Ashton Hagans	February 23	Portland Trail Blazers	Rip City Remix (NBA G League)	
Jordan Goodwin	February 24	Memphis Grizzlies (10-day contract ended on February 24)		
Andrew Funk	February 25	Chicago Bulls	Grand Rapids Gold (NBA G League)	
Marques Bolden	March 2	Charlotte Hornets (10-day contract ended on March 1)		
Jamaree Bouyea	March 2	San Antonio Spurs	Sioux Falls Skyforce (NBA G League)	
D. J. Carton	March 2	Toronto Raptors (10-day contract ended on March 2)		
Jeff Dowtin	March 2	Philadelphia 76ers	Delaware Blue Coats (NBA G League)	
Harry Giles III	March 2	Los Angeles Lakers	Brooklyn Nets (waived on February 8)	
Jacob Gilyard	March 2	Brooklyn Nets	Memphis Grizzlies (waived on February 24; previously on a two-way contract)	
RaiQuan Gray	March 2	San Antonio Spurs	Austin Spurs (NBA G League)	
Justin Champagnie	March 3	Washington Wizards (10-day contract ended on March 3)		
Jaylin Galloway	March 3	Milwaukee Bucks	Sydney Kings (Australia)	
Alex Fudge	March 4	Dallas Mavericks	South Bay Lakers (NBA G League)	
Mouhamadou Gueye	March 4	Toronto Raptors	Raptors 905 (NBA G League)	
Quenton Jackson	March 4	Indiana Pacers	Windy City Bulls (NBA G League)	
Jacob Toppin	March 4	New York Knicks (10-day contract ended on March 4)		
Ish Wainright	March 4	Phoenix Suns	Portland Trail Blazers (waived on January 6)	
Dylan Windler	March 4	Atlanta Hawks	Los Angeles Lakers (waived on March 2; previously on a two-way contract)	

=== Going to other North American leagues ===
The new league of all players is the NBA G League, although some players returned to their former team, as shown below. The NBA contract status of nearly all players is unrestricted free agent, and the rest are stated otherwise.

*	Denotes G-League players who returned to their former team
^{†}	Previously on a two-way contract
	Denotes players whose NBA contract status is unsigned draft pick
^{R}	Denotes unsigned players whose free-agent rights were renounced

Player	Date signed	New team	NBA team	Ref
Juan Toscano-Anderson	September 30	Mexico City Capitanes	Utah Jazz	
James Akinjo	October 28	Stockton Kings	Sacramento Kings	
James Banks III	October 28	Maine Celtics	Boston Celtics	
Damion Baugh	October 28	South Bay Lakers	Los Angeles Lakers	
Jordan Bell*	October 28	Indiana Mad Ants	Indiana Pacers	
Pedro Bradshaw*	October 28	Indiana Mad Ants	Indiana Pacers	
Deonte Burton*	October 28	Stockton Kings	Sacramento Kings	
Kennedy Chandler	October 28	Long Island Nets	Brooklyn Nets	
Chance Comanche*	October 28	Stockton Kings	Sacramento Kings	
Sharife Cooper*	October 28	Cleveland Charge	Cleveland Cavaliers	
Mamadi Diakite	October 28	Westchester Knicks	New York Knicks	
Kyler Edwards	October 28	Long Island Nets	Brooklyn Nets	
Rob Edwards	October 28	Cleveland Charge	Cleveland Cavaliers	
Aleem Ford	October 28	Cleveland Charge	Cleveland Cavaliers	
Taylor Funk	October 28	Maine Celtics	Boston Celtics	
Patrick Gardner	October 28	Long Island Nets	Brooklyn Nets	
Brandon Goodwin*	October 28	Westchester Knicks	New York Knicks	
Dane Goodwin	October 28	Stockton Kings	Sacramento Kings	
Jordan Hall	October 28	Long Island Nets	Brooklyn Nets	
Bryce Hamilton*	October 28	South Bay Lakers	Los Angeles Lakers	
Kameron Hankerson*	October 28	Long Island Nets	Brooklyn Nets	
Kylor Kelley	October 28	Maine Celtics	Boston Celtics	
Louis King	October 28	South Bay Lakers	Los Angeles Lakers	
Mojave King	October 28	Indiana Mad Ants	Indiana Pacers	
Skal Labissière	October 28	Stockton Kings	Sacramento Kings	
Jeremy Lamb	October 28	Stockton Kings	Sacramento Kings	
Scottie Lewis	October 28	Windy City Bulls	Charlotte Hornets	
Scottie Lindsey	October 28	Long Island Nets	Brooklyn Nets	
Kyle Mangas	October 28	Indiana Mad Ants	Indiana Pacers	
Jaylen Martin^{†}	October 28	Westchester Knicks	New York Knicks	
Darius McGhee	October 28	Indiana Mad Ants	Indiana Pacers	
Trey McGowens*	October 28	Long Island Nets	Brooklyn Nets	
Pete Nance	October 28	Cleveland Charge	Cleveland Cavaliers	
Obadiah Noel*	October 28	Westchester Knicks	New York Knicks	
Jaylen Nowell	October 28	Stockton Kings	Sacramento Kings	
Elfrid Payton*	October 28	Indiana Mad Ants	Indiana Pacers	
Scotty Pippen Jr.*	October 28	South Bay Lakers	Los Angeles Lakers	
Justin Powell	October 28	Cleveland Charge	Cleveland Cavaliers	
Isaiah Roby	October 28	Westchester Knicks	New York Knicks	
Jordan Schakel	October 28	Maine Celtics	Boston Celtics	
Devontae Shuler*	October 28	Cleveland Charge	Cleveland Cavaliers	
Dmytro Skapintsev*	October 28	Westchester Knicks	New York Knicks	
Brandon Slater	October 28	Maine Celtics	Boston Celtics	
Zhaire Smith	October 28	Cleveland Charge	Cleveland Cavaliers	
Jake Stephens	October 28	Stockton Kings	Sacramento Kings	
DJ Steward	October 28	Maine Celtics	Boston Celtics	
Craig Sword	October 28	Indiana Mad Ants	Indiana Pacers	
Keifer Sykes	October 28	Long Island Nets	Brooklyn Nets	
Reid Travis	October 28	Indiana Mad Ants	Indiana Pacers	
Vincent Valerio-Bodon	October 28	South Bay Lakers	Los Angeles Lakers	
Quinndary Weatherspoon	October 28	South Bay Lakers	Los Angeles Lakers	
Jack White	October 28	South Bay Lakers	Oklahoma City Thunder	
KJ Williams	October 28	Oklahoma City Blue	Oklahoma City Thunder	
Angelo Allegri	October 29	Greensboro Swarm	Charlotte Hornets	
Marcus Bagley	October 29	Delaware Blue Coats	Philadelphia 76ers	
Brian Bowen*	October 29	Iowa Wolves	Minnesota Timberwolves	
Tony Bradley	October 29	Texas Legends	Dallas Mavericks	
Izaiah Brockington*	October 29	Birmingham Squadron	New Orleans Pelicans	
Terrell Brown Jr.	October 29	Greensboro Swarm	Charlotte Hornets	
Jared Brownridge*	October 29	Delaware Blue Coats	Philadelphia 76ers	
Devin Cannady	October 29	Birmingham Squadron	New Orleans Pelicans	
D. J. Carton*	October 29	Iowa Wolves	Minnesota Timberwolves	
Javonte Cooke*	October 29	Iowa Wolves	Minnesota Timberwolves	
Jalen Crutcher	October 29	Birmingham Squadron	New Orleans Pelicans	
David Duke Jr.	October 29	Delaware Blue Coats	Philadelphia 76ers	
Malcolm Hill*	October 29	Birmingham Squadron	New Orleans Pelicans	
R. J. Hunter	October 29	Greensboro Swarm	Charlotte Hornets	
Trey Jemison	October 29	Birmingham Squadron	New Orleans Pelicans	
Jarkel Joiner	October 29	College Park Skyhawks	Atlanta Hawks	
Tevian Jones	October 29	Birmingham Squadron	New Orleans Pelicans	
Trevor Keels	October 29	Iowa Wolves	Minnesota Timberwolves	
Reginald Kissoonlal*	October 29	College Park Skyhawks	Boston Celtics	
Vít Krejčí	October 29	Iowa Wolves	Minnesota Timberwolves	
Tyrese Martin	October 29	Iowa Wolves	Minnesota Timberwolves	
Nathan Mensah	October 29	Greensboro Swarm	Charlotte Hornets	
Mike Miles Jr.^{†}	October 29	Texas Legends	Dallas Mavericks	
Tazé Moore*	October 29	Texas Legends	Dallas Mavericks	
Landers Nolley II	October 29	Birmingham Squadron	New Orleans Pelicans	
Theo Pinson*	October 29	Texas Legends	Dallas Mavericks	
Brandon Randolph	October 29	College Park Skyhawks	Atlanta Hawks	
Liam Robbins	October 29	Birmingham Squadron	New Orleans Pelicans	
Trevon Scott*	October 29	Greensboro Swarm	Charlotte Hornets	
Chris Silva*	October 29	College Park Skyhawks	Atlanta Hawks	
Jaylen Sims*	October 29	Greensboro Swarm	Charlotte Hornets	
David Singleton	October 29	College Park Skyhawks	Atlanta Hawks	
Jordan Walker	October 29	Texas Legends	Dallas Mavericks	
Keaton Wallace	October 29	College Park Skyhawks	Atlanta Hawks	
Joe Wieskamp	October 29	Texas Legends	Dallas Mavericks	
Timmy Allen	October 30	Memphis Hustle	Memphis Grizzlies	
Alex Antetokounmpo*	October 30	Wisconsin Herd	Milwaukee Bucks	
Adonis Arms*	October 30	Memphis Hustle	Memphis Grizzlies	
Chase Audige	October 30	Capital City Go-Go	Washington Wizards	
Ibou Badji*^{†}	October 30	Wisconsin Herd	Portland Trail Blazers	
Jules Bernard*	October 30	Capital City Go-Go	Washington Wizards	
Buddy Boeheim*	October 30	Motor City Cruise	Detroit Pistons	
Souley Boum	October 30	Grand Rapids Gold	Denver Nuggets	
Jamaree Bouyea*^{†}	October 30	Sioux Falls Skyforce	Miami Heat	
Amida Brimah	October 30	Grand Rapids Gold	Denver Nuggets	
Michael Carter-Williams	October 30	Mexico City Capitanes	Orlando Magic	
Justin Champagnie*	October 30	Sioux Falls Skyforce	Miami Heat	
Kihei Clark	October 30	Wisconsin Herd	Milwaukee Bucks	
Yuri Collins	October 30	Santa Cruz Warriors	Golden State Warriors	
George Conditt IV	October 30	Rip City Remix	Portland Trail Blazers	
Caleb Daniels	October 30	Sioux Falls Skyforce	Miami Heat	
Nate Darling*	October 30	Ontario Clippers	Los Angeles Clippers	
Antoine Davis	October 30	Rip City Remix	Portland Trail Blazers	
Kendric Davis	October 30	Santa Cruz Warriors	Golden State Warriors	
Darius Days*^{†}	October 30	Rio Grande Valley Vipers	Houston Rockets	
Michael Devoe	October 30	Salt Lake City Stars	Utah Jazz	
Cheick Diallo	October 30	Sioux Falls Skyforce	Miami Heat	
Hamidou Diallo	October 30	Capital City Go-Go	Washington Wizards	
Devon Dotson*	October 30	Capital City Go-Go	Washington Wizards	
Jon Elmore*	October 30	Sioux Falls Skyforce	Miami Heat	
Tosan Evbuomwan	October 30	Motor City Cruise	Detroit Pistons	
Malik Fitts	October 30	Capital City Go-Go	Washington Wizards	
Michael Foster Jr.	October 30	Capital City Go-Go	Washington Wizards	
Armaan Franklin	October 30	Grand Rapids Gold	Denver Nuggets	
Andrew Funk	October 30	Grand Rapids Gold	Denver Nuggets	
Wenyen Gabriel*	October 30	Wisconsin Herd	Boston Celtics	
Jazian Gortman	October 30	Wisconsin Herd	Milwaukee Bucks	
Treveon Graham	October 30	Motor City Cruise	Detroit Pistons	
Javonte Green	October 30	Santa Cruz Warriors	Golden State Warriors	
Mouhamadou Gueye	October 30	Raptors 905	Toronto Raptors	
Ashton Hagans	October 30	Rip City Remix	Portland Trail Blazers	
Joey Hauser	October 30	Ontario Clippers	Los Angeles Clippers	
Elijah Hughes*	October 30	Wisconsin Herd	Milwaukee Bucks	
Matthew Hurt*	October 30	Memphis Hustle	Memphis Grizzlies	
David Johnson	October 30	Memphis Hustle	Memphis Grizzlies	
Javan Johnson	October 30	Santa Cruz Warriors	Golden State Warriors	
Jayce Johnson*	October 30	Santa Cruz Warriors	Golden State Warriors	
Keshawn Justice	October 30	Salt Lake City Stars	Utah Jazz	
Gabe Kalscheur	October 30	Capital City Go-Go	Washington Wizards	
Taevion Kinsey	October 30	Salt Lake City Stars	Utah Jazz	
Kevin Knox II	October 30	Rip City Remix	Portland Trail Blazers	
Romeo Langford	October 30	Salt Lake City Stars	Utah Jazz	
Makur Maker	October 30	Raptors 905	Toronto Raptors	
Matthew Mayer	October 30	Rio Grande Valley Vipers	Houston Rockets	
Brandon McCoy*	October 30	Sioux Falls Skyforce	Miami Heat	
Isaiah Miller*	October 30	Salt Lake City Stars	Utah Jazz	
Iverson Molinar*	October 30	Wisconsin Herd	Milwaukee Bucks	
Xavier Moon*	October 30	Ontario Clippers	Los Angeles Clippers	
Omari Moore	October 30	Raptors 905	Toronto Raptors	
Darryl Morsell*	October 30	Raptors 905	Toronto Raptors	
Mychal Mulder	October 30	Memphis Hustle	Memphis Grizzlies	
David Nwaba*	October 30	Motor City Cruise	Detroit Pistons	
Kevin Obanor	October 30	Raptors 905	Toronto Raptors	
Joshua Obiesie	October 30	Rio Grande Valley Vipers	Houston Rockets	
Nick Ongenda	October 30	Salt Lake City Stars	Utah Jazz	
Drew Peterson	October 30	Sioux Falls Skyforce	Miami Heat	
Jamorko Pickett	October 30	Grand Rapids Gold	Denver Nuggets	
Jontay Porter	October 30	Motor City Cruise	Detroit Pistons	
Jason Preston	October 30	Memphis Hustle	Memphis Grizzlies	
Nate Roberts*	October 30	Motor City Cruise	Detroit Pistons	
Glenn Robinson III	October 30	Wisconsin Herd	Milwaukee Bucks	
Zavier Simpson	October 30	Motor City Cruise	Detroit Pistons	
Malachi Smith	October 30	Rip City Remix	Portland Trail Blazers	
Brodric Thomas	October 30	Ontario Clippers	Los Angeles Clippers	
Drew Timme	October 30	Wisconsin Herd	Milwaukee Bucks	
Isaiah Todd*	October 30	NBA G League Ignite	Memphis Grizzlies	
Au'Diese Toney	October 30	Grand Rapids Gold	Denver Nuggets	
Ryan Turell*	October 30	Motor City Cruise	Detroit Pistons	
Alondes Williams	October 30	Sioux Falls Skyforce	Miami Heat	
Bryson Williams*	October 30	Ontario Clippers	Los Angeles Clippers	
Donovan Williams	October 30	Santa Cruz Warriors	Golden State Warriors	
Bryce Wills*	October 30	Grand Rapids Gold	Denver Nuggets	
Justise Winslow	October 30	Raptors 905	Toronto Raptors	
Adam Flagler	October 31	Oklahoma City Blue	Oklahoma City Thunder	
RaiQuan Gray	October 31	Austin Spurs	San Antonio Spurs	
Hunter Maldonado	October 31	Oklahoma City Blue	Oklahoma City Thunder	
Caleb McConnell	October 31	Oklahoma City Blue	Oklahoma City Thunder	
Javante McCoy	October 31	Austin Spurs	San Antonio Spurs	
Jahmi'us Ramsey*	October 31	Oklahoma City Blue	Oklahoma City Thunder	
Jaden Shackelford*	October 31	Oklahoma City Blue	Oklahoma City Thunder	
Erik Stevenson	October 31	Austin Spurs	San Antonio Spurs	
Paul Watson	October 31	Austin Spurs	San Antonio Spurs	
Henri Drell*	November 2	Windy City Bulls	Chicago Bulls	
Jeff Dowtin	November 2	Delaware Blue Coats	Toronto Raptors	
Derrick Favors	November 2	Windy City Bulls	Chicago Bulls	
Max Heidegger	November 2	Windy City Bulls	Chicago Bulls	
Quenton Jackson	November 2	Windy City Bulls	Chicago Bulls	
Mac McClung	November 2	Osceola Magic	Orlando Magic	
Alex Morales*	November 2	Osceola Magic	Orlando Magic	
Miye Oni	November 2	Osceola Magic	Orlando Magic	
Daeqwon Plowden	November 2	Osceola Magic	Orlando Magic	
Kahlil Whitney	November 2	Windy City Bulls	Chicago Bulls	
Brandon Williams	November 2	Osceola Magic	Orlando Magic	
D. J. Wilson*	November 2	Osceola Magic	Orlando Magic	
Kaiser Gates*^{†}	November 11	Long Island Nets	New Orleans Pelicans	
Shaquille Harrison*	November 14	South Bay Lakers	Memphis Grizzlies	
Dewayne Dedmon	November 17	Ontario Clippers	Philadelphia 76ers	
Kobi Simmons	November 22	Raptors 905	Charlotte Hornets	
Jamaree Bouyea*^{†}	November 25	Sioux Falls Skyforce	Portland Trail Blazers	
Maurice Harkless	November 26	Rip City Remix	Sacramento Kings	
Shaquille Harrison*	December 5	South Bay Lakers	Memphis Grizzlies	
Darius Bazley	December 8	Delaware Blue Coats	Brooklyn Nets	
John Butler Jr.*^{†}	December 10	Capital City Go-Go	Washington Wizards	
Terence Davis^{R}	December 11	Rip City Remix	Sacramento Kings	
Jaylen Nowell*	December 15	Stockton Kings	Memphis Grizzlies	
Dylan Windler*	December 15	Westchester Knicks	New York Knicks	
Sir'Jabari Rice*^{†}	December 16	Austin Spurs	San Antonio Spurs	
Nathan Knight^{†}	December 17	Motor City Cruise	Boston Celtics	
Justin Lewis*^{†}	December 18	Windy City Bulls	Chicago Bulls	
Jaylen Martin*^{†}	December 26	Westchester Knicks	New York Knicks	
Miles Norris*^{†}	December 26	College Park Skyhawks	Atlanta Hawks	
Javonte Smart*^{†}	December 27	Delaware Blue Coats	Philadelphia 76ers	
Dexter Dennis*^{†}	December 30	Texas Legends	Dallas Mavericks	
DaQuan Jeffries*	January 2	Westchester Knicks	New York Knicks	
Dmytro Skapintsev*^{†}	January 3	Westchester Knicks	New York Knicks	
Alex Fudge*^{†}	January 10	South Bay Lakers	Los Angeles Lakers	
Marques Bolden*^{†}	January 12	Wisconsin Herd	Milwaukee Bucks	
Armoni Brooks^{†}	January 13	Ontario Clippers	Brooklyn Nets	
Josh Christopher^{†}	January 14	Sioux Falls Skyforce	Utah Jazz	
D'Moi Hodge^{†}	January 17	Rip City Remix	Los Angeles Lakers	
Hamidou Diallo*	January 19	Capital City Go-Go	Washington Wizards	
Kent Bazemore	January 28	Greensboro Swarm	Los Angeles Lakers	
Tazé Moore*	January 30	Rip City Remix	Portland Trail Blazers	
Pete Nance*	January 30	Cleveland Charge	Cleveland Cavaliers	
Gabe York^{†}	January 31	NBA G League Ignite	Indiana Pacers	
Marquese Chriss	February 1	Wisconsin Herd	Oklahoma City Thunder	
Malcolm Hill*	February 8	Birmingham Squadron	New Orleans Pelicans	
Tosan Evbuomwan*	February 9	Motor City Cruise	Memphis Grizzlies	
Matthew Hurt*	February 9	Memphis Hustle	Memphis Grizzlies	
Rodney Hood	February 11	Memphis Hustle	Los Angeles Clippers	
R. J. Hampton^{†}	February 14	Capital City Go-Go	Miami Heat	
Ashton Hagans*	February 18	Rip City Remix	Portland Trail Blazers	
Mouhamadou Gueye*	February 20	Raptors 905	Toronto Raptors	
Justise Winslow*	February 20	Raptors 905	Toronto Raptors	
Juan Toscano-Anderson*	February 21	Mexico City Capitanes	Sacramento Kings	
Ryan Arcidiacono*	February 23	Windy City Bulls	Detroit Pistons	
Zhaire Smith*	February 23	Cleveland Charge	Cleveland Cavaliers	
Malcolm Cazalon^{†}	February 24	Westchester Knicks	Detroit Pistons	
Darius Bazley*	March 1	Delaware Blue Coats	Philadelphia 76ers	
Kevin Knox II*	March 1	Rip City Remix	Utah Jazz	
Jalen Crutcher*	March 3	Birmingham Squadron	New Orleans Pelicans	
Justin Jackson*	March 3	Texas Legends	Minnesota Timberwolves	
DaQuan Jeffries*	March 3	Westchester Knicks	New York Knicks	
Nathan Mensah*^{†}	March 4	Greensboro Swarm	Charlotte Hornets	
Mamadi Diakite*^{†}	March 6	Westchester Knicks	San Antonio Spurs	
Markquis Nowell*^{†}	March 6	Raptors 905	Toronto Raptors	
Isaiah Thomas	March 6	Salt Lake City Stars	Charlotte Hornets	
Charles Bediako*^{†}	March 7	Austin Spurs	San Antonio Spurs	
Sharife Cooper*	March 7	Cleveland Charge	Cleveland Cavaliers	
Matthew Hurt*	March 7	Memphis Hustle	Memphis Grizzlies	
Théo Maledon^{†}	March 11	Sioux Falls Skyforce	Phoenix Suns	
R. J. Hampton*	March 13	Capital City Go-Go	Washington Wizards	
Taevion Kinsey*	March 13	Salt Lake City Stars	Utah Jazz	
Izaiah Brockington*	March 14	Birmingham Squadron	New Orleans Pelicans	
Wenyen Gabriel*	March 18	Wisconsin Herd	Memphis Grizzlies	
Jahmi'us Ramsey*	March 25	Oklahoma City Blue	Toronto Raptors	
DeJon Jarreau*	March 30	Memphis Hustle	Memphis Grizzlies	
D. J. Wilson*	April 4	Osceola Magic	Philadelphia 76ers	

=== Going abroad ===
The following players were previously on NBA rosters, but chose to sign with abroad teams after their contract expired and they became free agents. The list also includes unsigned 2023 draft picks who signed with overseas teams, but excludes unsigned 2022 draft picks who were already playing overseas before the draft.

*	Denotes international players who returned to their home country
	Denotes players whose NBA contract status is unsigned draft pick

Player	Date signed	New team	New country	Former NBA team	Ref
Jonah Bolden*	June 19	Sydney Kings	Australia	Phoenix Suns	
Marko Simonović	July 9	Crvena zvezda Meridianbet	Serbia	Chicago Bulls	
Willy Hernangómez*	July 13	FC Barcelona	Spain	New Orleans Pelicans	
Davon Reed	July 21	Prometey	Latvia	Los Angeles Lakers	
Kemba Walker	July 21	AS Monaco	Monaco	Dallas Mavericks	
McKinley Wright IV	July 22	Budućnost VOLI	Montenegro	Dallas Mavericks	
Juancho Hernangómez	July 28	Panathinaikos	Greece	Toronto Raptors	
Jarrell Brantley	August 1	Nagasaki Velca	Japan	Utah Jazz	
Raul Neto	August 5	Fenerbahçe Beko	Turkey	Cleveland Cavaliers	
Jabari Parker	August 6	FC Barcelona	Spain	Boston Celtics	
PJ Dozier	August 11	Partizan Mozzart Bet	Serbia	Sacramento Kings	
Mfiondu Kabengele	August 13	AEK Athens	Greece	Boston Celtics	
Noah Vonleh	August 17	Shanghai Sharks	China	San Antonio Spurs	
Frank Kaminsky	August 18	Partizan Mozzart Bet	Serbia	Houston Rockets	
Xavier Sneed	August 30	Happy Casa Brindisi	Italy	Charlotte Hornets	
Vernon Carey Jr.	September 2	Pınar Karşıyaka	Turkey	Utah Jazz	
Serge Ibaka	September 14	Bayern Munich	Germany	Milwaukee Bucks	
Nick Young	September 26	Macau Black Bears	Macau	Denver Nuggets	
Anthony Lamb	October 10	BNZ Breakers	New Zealand	Golden State Warriors	
Dejan Vasiljevic*	October 17	Adelaide 36ers	Australia	Washington Wizards	
Kendrick Nunn	October 31	Panathinaikos	Greece	Washington Wizards	
Carlik Jones	November 2	Zhejiang Golden Bulls	China	Chicago Bulls	
Trevor Hudgins	November 4	Le Mans	France	Houston Rockets	
Ąžuolas Tubelis*	November 8	Rytas Vilnius	Lithuania	Philadelphia 76ers	
Xavier Cooks	November 21	Chiba Jets Funabashi	Japan	Washington Wizards	
Filip Petrušev	November 28	Olympiacos Piraeus	Greece	Sacramento Kings	
Edmond Sumner	November 29	Žalgiris Kaunas	Lithuania	Charlotte Hornets	
Abdel Nader	December 12	South East Melbourne Phoenix	Australia	Phoenix Suns	
Rodney McGruder	January 10	EA7 Emporio Armani Milan	Italy	Golden State Warriors	
Will Barton	January 29	CSKA Moscow	Russia	Toronto Raptors	
Khem Birch	February 5	Bàsquet Girona	Spain	San Antonio Spurs	
Lindell Wigginton	February 5	Xinjiang Flying Tigers	China	Milwaukee Bucks	
Ricky Rubio*	February 6	FC Barcelona	Spain	Cleveland Cavaliers	
Kevin Porter Jr.	April 2	PAOK	Greece	Oklahoma City Thunder	
Tazé Moore	April 18	Vancouver Bandits	Canada	Portland Trail Blazers	
Jack White*	May 15	Melbourne United	Australia	Memphis Grizzlies	

=== Waived ===
	Denotes player who did not clear waivers because his contract was claimed by another team
^{†}	Denotes players who were on a two-way contract
	Denotes players whose contracts were voided

Player	Date Waived	Former Team	Ref
R. J. Hampton	June 23	Detroit Pistons	
Donovan Williams ^{†}	June 26	Atlanta Hawks	
Eric Gordon	June 28	Los Angeles Clippers	
Taurean Prince	June 28	Minnesota Timberwolves	
Mo Bamba	June 29	Los Angeles Lakers	
Shaquille Harrison	June 29	Los Angeles Lakers	
Daishen Nix	June 29	Houston Rockets	
Trendon Watford	June 30	Portland Trail Blazers	
Eugene Omoruyi	July 1	Detroit Pistons	
Bol Bol	July 4	Orlando Magic	
Garrett Temple	July 5	New Orleans Pelicans	
Marko Simonović	July 6	Chicago Bulls	
Vernon Carey Jr.	July 7	Utah Jazz	
PJ Dozier	July 8	Sacramento Kings	
Edmond Sumner	July 15	Brooklyn Nets	
Lamar Stevens	July 17	San Antonio Spurs	
Joe Wieskamp	July 17	Toronto Raptors	
RaiQuan Gray ^{†}	July 18	Brooklyn Nets	
Rudy Gay	July 19	Oklahoma City Thunder	
Tyrese Martin	July 21	Atlanta Hawks	
Quenton Jackson ^{†}	July 24	Washington Wizards	
Duane Washington Jr. ^{†}	July 24	New York Knicks	
Trevor Keels ^{†}	July 26	New York Knicks	
Cole Swider ^{†}	July 26	Los Angeles Lakers	
Nate Williams	July 28	Portland Trail Blazers	
Justin Champagnie	July 31	Boston Celtics	
Xavier Sneed ^{†}	August 3	Charlotte Hornets	
Brandon McCoy	August 11	Miami Heat	
Vít Krejčí	August 16	Atlanta Hawks	
TyTy Washington Jr.	August 18	Oklahoma City Thunder	
Usman Garuba	August 21	Oklahoma City Thunder	
JaVale McGee	August 29	Dallas Mavericks	
Kobi Simmons	August 30	Charlotte Hornets	
Alex Antetokounmpo	August 31	Milwaukee Bucks	
Iverson Molinar	September 2	Milwaukee Bucks	
Obadiah Noel	September 6	New York Knicks	
Skal Labissière	September 8	Sacramento Kings	
Cameron Payne	September 11	San Antonio Spurs	
Nerlens Noel	September 12	Sacramento Kings	
Neemias Queta	September 12	Sacramento Kings	
Alex Morales	September 15	Orlando Magic	
Dmytro Skapintsev	September 15	New York Knicks	
Bryce Hamilton	September 18	Los Angeles Lakers	
Javante McCoy	September 20	San Antonio Spurs	
Jordan Hall	September 25	Brooklyn Nets	
Keifer Sykes	September 25	Brooklyn Nets	
Marcus Bagley	September 26	Philadelphia 76ers	
Jamaree Bouyea ^{†}	September 27	Miami Heat	
Pedro Bradshaw	September 27	Indiana Pacers	
Caleb Daniels	September 27	Miami Heat	
Jon Elmore	September 27	Miami Heat	
Chris Silva	September 27	Atlanta Hawks	
Craig Sword	September 27	Indiana Pacers	
Kyler Edwards	September 28	Brooklyn Nets	
Taylor Funk	September 28	Boston Celtics	
Jayce Johnson	September 28	Golden State Warriors	
Scottie Lindsey	September 28	Brooklyn Nets	
Kevin Obanor	September 28	Toronto Raptors	
Jordan Schakel	September 28	Boston Celtics	
Brandon Slater	September 28	Boston Celtics	
Angelo Allegri	September 29	Charlotte Hornets	
Devin Cannady	September 29	New Orleans Pelicans	
RaiQuan Gray	September 29	San Antonio Spurs	
Darryl Morsell	September 29	Toronto Raptors	
Joshua Obiesie	September 29	Houston Rockets	
Trevon Scott	September 29	Charlotte Hornets	
Jaylen Sims	September 29	Charlotte Hornets	
Jordan Bell	September 30	Indiana Pacers	
Reggie Bullock	September 30	San Antonio Spurs	
Josh Christopher	September 30	Memphis Grizzlies	
Setric Millner Jr. ^{†}	September 30	San Antonio Spurs	
Elfrid Payton	September 30	Indiana Pacers	
Isaiah Todd	September 30	Memphis Grizzlies	
James Akinjo	October 1	Sacramento Kings	
Ashton Hagans	October 1	Portland Trail Blazers	
Jason Preston	October 1	Los Angeles Clippers	
Dejan Vasiljevic	October 1	Washington Wizards	
Ibou Badji ^{†}	October 24	Portland Trail Blazers	
Edmond Sumner	October 24	Charlotte Hornets	
Ąžuolas Tubelis ^{†}	October 25	Philadelphia 76ers	
Danny Green	November 1	Philadelphia 76ers	
Kaiser Gates ^{†}	November 3	New Orleans Pelicans	
Daniel Theis	November 15	Indiana Pacers	
Jamaree Bouyea ^{†}	November 22	Portland Trail Blazers	
Filip Petrušev	November 24	Sacramento Kings	
Duane Washington Jr. ^{†}	November 27	New York Knicks	
John Butler Jr. ^{†}	December 8	Washington Wizards	
Ron Harper Jr. ^{†}	December 8	Toronto Raptors	
Nathan Knight ^{†}	December 12	Boston Celtics	
Dylan Windler	December 13	New York Knicks	
Théo Maledon ^{†}	December 14	Charlotte Hornets	
Sir'Jabari Rice ^{†}	December 14	San Antonio Spurs	
Justin Lewis ^{†}	December 15	Chicago Bulls	
Kenneth Lofton Jr.	December 18	Memphis Grizzlies	
Miles Norris ^{†}	December 22	Atlanta Hawks	
Jaylen Martin ^{†}	December 23	New York Knicks	
Javonte Smart ^{†}	December 23	Philadelphia 76ers	
Dexter Dennis ^{†}	December 28	Dallas Mavericks	
Charles Bediako ^{†}	December 29	San Antonio Spurs	
DaQuan Jeffries	December 30	New York Knicks	
Dmytro Skapintsev ^{†}	January 1	New York Knicks	
Ricky Rubio	January 4	Cleveland Cavaliers	
Armoni Brooks ^{†}	January 6	Brooklyn Nets	
Alex Fudge ^{†}	January 6	Los Angeles Lakers	
D'Moi Hodge ^{†}	January 6	Los Angeles Lakers	
Skylar Mays	January 6	Portland Trail Blazers	
Ish Wainright	January 6	Portland Trail Blazers	
Marques Bolden ^{†}	January 7	Milwaukee Bucks	
Taj Gibson	January 7	New York Knicks	
Juan Toscano-Anderson	January 7	Sacramento Kings	
Lindell Wigginton ^{†}	January 7	Milwaukee Bucks	
Ryan Rollins	January 8	Washington Wizards	
Josh Christopher ^{†}	January 9	Utah Jazz	
Bismack Biyombo	January 10	Memphis Grizzlies	
James Johnson	January 17	Indiana Pacers	
Christian Koloko	January 17	Toronto Raptors	
James Bouknight	February 8	Charlotte Hornets	
Spencer Dinwiddie	February 8	Toronto Raptors	
Harry Giles III	February 8	Brooklyn Nets	
Joe Harris	February 8	Detroit Pistons	
Killian Hayes	February 8	Detroit Pistons	
Danuel House Jr.	February 8	Detroit Pistons	
Cory Joseph	February 8	Indiana Pacers	
Robin Lopez	February 8	Sacramento Kings	
Frank Ntilikina	February 8	Charlotte Hornets	
Victor Oladipo	February 8	Memphis Grizzlies	
Ish Smith	February 8	Charlotte Hornets	
Thaddeus Young	February 8	Brooklyn Nets	
Danilo Gallinari	February 9	Detroit Pistons	
Jordan Goodwin	February 9	Brooklyn Nets	
R. J. Hampton ^{†}	February 9	Miami Heat	
Kevin Knox II	February 9	Utah Jazz	
Furkan Korkmaz	February 9	Indiana Pacers	
Chimezie Metu	February 9	Memphis Grizzlies	
Ryan Arcidiacono	February 10	Detroit Pistons	
Kyle Lowry	February 11	Charlotte Hornets	
Delon Wright	February 16	Washington Wizards	
Malcolm Cazalon ^{†}	February 21	Detroit Pistons	
Aleksej Pokuševski	February 23	Oklahoma City Thunder	
Jacob Gilyard ^{†}	February 24	Memphis Grizzlies	
Mike Muscala	February 28	Detroit Pistons	
Patty Mills	February 29	Atlanta Hawks	
Marcus Morris Sr.	February 29	San Antonio Spurs	
Kenneth Lofton Jr. ^{†}	March 1	Philadelphia 76ers	
Shake Milton	March 1	Detroit Pistons	
Mamadi Diakite ^{†}	March 2	San Antonio Spurs	
Nathan Mensah ^{†}	March 2	Charlotte Hornets	
Dylan Windler ^{†}	March 2	Los Angeles Lakers	
Théo Maledon ^{†}	March 4	Phoenix Suns	
Markquis Nowell ^{†}	March 4	Toronto Raptors	
Dru Smith	March 6	Miami Heat	
Otto Porter Jr.	March 11	Utah Jazz	
Taevion Kinsey	March 12	Utah Jazz	
Terry Taylor	April 4	Chicago Bulls	
Isaiah Livers	April 5	Washington Wizards	
Joshua Primo	April 13	Los Angeles Clippers	
Jontay Porter ^{†}	April 17	Toronto Raptors	

==== Training camp cuts ====
All players listed did not make the final roster.
^{†} On a two-way contract.
^{C} Claimed off waivers by another team.

Atlanta Hawks	Boston Celtics	Brooklyn Nets	Charlotte Hornets	Chicago Bulls
Jarkel Joiner; Brandon Randolph; David Singleton; Keaton Wallace	James Banks III; Wenyen Gabriel; Kylor Kelley; Reginald Kissoonlal; Jay Scrubb; DJ Steward	Darius Bazley; Kennedy Chandler; Patrick Gardner; Kameron Hankerson; Trey McGowens	Terrell Brown Jr.; R. J. Hunter; Kai Jones; Nathan Mensah	Henri Drell; Derrick Favors; Max Heidegger; Quenton Jackson; Carlik Jones; Kahlil Whitney
Cleveland Cavaliers	Dallas Mavericks	Denver Nuggets	Detroit Pistons	Golden State Warriors
Sharife Cooper; Rob Edwards; Aleem Ford; Pete Nance; Justin Powell; Devontae Shuler; Zhaire Smith	Tony Bradley; Mike Miles Jr.^{†}; Tazé Moore; Jordan Walker; Joe Wieskamp	Souley Boum; Amida Brimah; Armaan Franklin; Andrew Funk; Jamorko Pickett; Au'Diese Toney; Bryce Wills	Buddy Boeheim; Tosan Evbuomwan; Treveon Graham; David Nwaba; Jontay Porter; Nate Roberts; Zavier Simpson; Ryan Turell	Yuri Collins; Kendric Davis; Rudy Gay; Javonte Green; Javan Johnson; Rodney McGruder; Donovan Williams
Houston Rockets	Indiana Pacers	Los Angeles Clippers	Los Angeles Lakers	Memphis Grizzlies
Darius Days^{†}; Nate Hinton; Trevor Hudgins^{†}; Matthew Mayer; Jeremiah Robinson-Earl	Kyle Mangas; Darius McGhee; Reid Travis	Nate Darling; Joey Hauser; Xavier Moon; Brodric Thomas; Bryson Williams	Damion Baugh; Louis King; Scotty Pippen Jr.; Vincent Valerio-Bodon; Quinndary Weatherspoon	Timmy Allen; Adonis Arms; Shaquille Harrison; Matthew Hurt; David Johnson; Mychal Mulder; Jason Preston
Miami Heat	Milwaukee Bucks	Minnesota Timberwolves	New Orleans Pelicans	New York Knicks
Justin Champagnie; Cheick Diallo; Drew Peterson; Alondes Williams	Kihei Clark; Jazian Gortman; Elijah Hughes; Omari Moore^{†}; Glenn Robinson III; Drew Timme	Brian Bowen; D. J. Carton; Javonte Cooke; Trevor Keels; Vít Krejčí; Tyrese Martin; Matt Ryan^{†C}	Izaiah Brockington; Jalen Crutcher; Malcolm Hill; Trey Jemison; Tevian Jones; Landers Nolley II; Liam Robbins	Mamadi Diakite; Brandon Goodwin; Nathan Knight^{†}; Jaylen Martin^{†}; Isaiah Roby; Duane Washington Jr.
Oklahoma City Thunder	Orlando Magic	Philadelphia 76ers	Phoenix Suns	Portland Trail Blazers
Adam Flagler; Hunter Maldonado; Caleb McConnell; Kevin Porter Jr.; Jahmi'us Ramsey; Jaden Shackelford; Jack White; KJ Williams	Mac McClung; Miye Oni; Daeqwon Plowden; Brandon Williams; D. J. Wilson	Jared Brownridge; Ricky Council IV^{†}; David Duke Jr.; Montrezl Harrell	Keon Johnson; Ish Wainright^{C}	John Butler Jr.^{†}; George Conditt IV; Antoine Davis; Kevin Knox II; Duop Reath; Malachi Smith
Sacramento Kings	San Antonio Spurs	Toronto Raptors	Utah Jazz	Washington Wizards
Deonte Burton; Chance Comanche; Dane Goodwin; Jeremy Lamb; Jaylen Nowell; Jake Stephens	Khem Birch; Erik Stevenson; Paul Watson	Jeff Dowtin; Mouhamadou Gueye; Makur Maker; Omari Moore; Justise Winslow	Michael Devoe; Joey Hauser^{†}; Keshawn Justice; Taevion Kinsey; Romeo Langford; Isaiah Miller; Nick Ongenda	Chase Audige; Jules Bernard; Xavier Cooks; Hamidou Diallo; Devon Dotson; Malik Fitts; Michael Foster Jr.; Taj Gibson; Gabe Kalscheur

== Draft ==
The 2023 NBA draft was held on June 22, 2023, at Barclays Center in Brooklyn, New York. In two rounds of the draft, 58 amateur United States college basketball players and other eligible players, including international players, were selected. The following players signed a regular rookie contract unless noted otherwise.

Denotes players who signed two-way contract
Denotes players whose NBA two-way contract was upgraded to standard NBA contract
Denotes players who are expected to play abroad
Denotes players who are expected to play in the NBA G League without signing an NBA contract

=== First round ===
Pick	Player	Date signed	Team (Note: Team denotes the team that holds the players' draft rights at the time of contract signing. Teams in parentheses denotes the teams that drafted the players before any trade occurred.)	Ref
1	Victor Wembanyama	July 1	San Antonio Spurs	
2	Brandon Miller	July 2	Charlotte Hornets	
3	Scoot Henderson	July 1	Portland Trail Blazers	
4	Amen Thompson	July 3	Houston Rockets	
5	Ausar Thompson	July 2	Detroit Pistons	
6	Anthony Black	July 1	Orlando Magic	
7	Bilal Coulibaly	July 2	Washington Wizards (rights acquired from Indiana)	
8	Jarace Walker	July 1	Indiana Pacers (rights acquired from Washington)	
9	Taylor Hendricks	July 2	Utah Jazz	
10	Cason Wallace	July 7	Oklahoma City Thunder (rights acquired from Dallas)	
11	Jett Howard	July 1	Orlando Magic	
12	Dereck Lively II	July 8	Dallas Mavericks (rights acquired from Oklahoma City)	
13	Gradey Dick	July 2	Toronto Raptors	
14	Jordan Hawkins	July 3	New Orleans Pelicans	
15	Kobe Bufkin	July 3	Atlanta Hawks	
16	Keyonte George	July 2	Utah Jazz	
17	Jalen Hood-Schifino	July 8	Los Angeles Lakers	
18	Jaime Jaquez Jr.	July 1	Miami Heat	
19	Brandin Podziemski	July 3	Golden State Warriors	
20	Cam Whitmore	July 3	Houston Rockets	
21	Noah Clowney	July 11	Brooklyn Nets	
22	Dariq Whitehead	July 10	Brooklyn Nets	
23	Kris Murray	July 1	Portland Trail Blazers	
24	Olivier-Maxence Prosper	July 16	Dallas Mavericks (rights acquired from Sacramento)	
25	Marcus Sasser	July 5	Detroit Pistons (rights acquired from Boston through Memphis)	
26	Ben Sheppard	July 1	Indiana Pacers	
27	Nick Smith Jr.	July 3	Charlotte Hornets	
28	Brice Sensabaugh	July 2	Utah Jazz	
29	Julian Strawther	July 6	Denver Nuggets (rights acquired from Indiana)	
30	Kobe Brown	July 3	Los Angeles Clippers	

=== Second round ===
Pick	Player	Date signed	Team	Ref
31	James Nnaji	—	Charlotte Hornets (rights acquired from Boston through Detroit)	
32	Jalen Pickett	July 6	Denver Nuggets (rights acquired from Indiana)	
33	Leonard Miller	July 8	Minnesota Timberwolves (rights acquired from San Antonio)	
34	Colby Jones	July 2	Sacramento Kings (rights acquired from Charlotte)	
35	Julian Phillips	July 12	Chicago Bulls (rights acquired from Wizards through Boston)	
36	Andre Jackson Jr.	July 7	Milwaukee Bucks (rights acquired from Orlando)	
37	Hunter Tyson	July 6	Denver Nuggets (rights acquired from Oklahoma City)	
38	Jordan Walsh	July 6	Boston Celtics (rights acquired from Sacramento)	
39	Mouhamed Gueye	July 3	Atlanta Hawks (rights acquired from Boston through Charlotte)	
40	Maxwell Lewis	July 8	Los Angeles Lakers (rights acquired from Indiana through Denver)	
41	Amari Bailey	July 14	Charlotte Hornets	
42	Tristan Vukčević	March 14	Washington Wizards	
43	Rayan Rupert	July 4	Portland Trail Blazers	
44	Sidy Cissoko	July 27	San Antonio Spurs	
45	GG Jackson	August 31	Memphis Grizzlies	
46	Seth Lundy	July 6	Atlanta Hawks	
47	Mojave King	—	Indiana Pacers (rights acquired from LA Lakers)	
48	Jordan Miller	August 7	Los Angeles Clippers	
49	Emoni Bates	July 7	Cleveland Cavaliers	
50	Keyontae Johnson	July 7	Oklahoma City Thunder	
51	Jalen Wilson	July 5	Brooklyn Nets	
52	Toumani Camara	July 3	Phoenix Suns	
53	Jaylen Clark	July 7	Minnesota Timberwolves	
54	Jalen Slawson	July 2	Sacramento Kings	
55	Isaiah Wong	July 3	Indiana Pacers	
56	Tarik Biberović	—	Memphis Grizzlies	
Chicago Bulls (forfeited)
Philadelphia 76ers (forfeited)
57	Trayce Jackson-Davis	July 6	Golden State Warriors (rights acquired from Washington)	
58	Chris Livingston	July 8	Milwaukee Bucks	

=== Previous years' draftees ===
Draft	Pick	Player	Date signed	Team	Previous team	Ref
2017	57	Aleksandar Vezenkov	July 13	Sacramento Kings	Olympiacos (Greece)	
2021	50	Filip Petrušev	July 16	Philadelphia 76ers	Crvena zvezda Meridianbet (Serbia)	
2014	52	Vasilije Micić	July 17	Oklahoma City Thunder	Anadolu Efes (Turkey)	
2022	55	Gui Santos	November 7	Golden State Warriors	Santa Cruz Warriors (NBA G League)	
