= Angelo Allegri =

American basketball player (born 1999)

Free agent
- Position: Forward

Personal information
- Born: April 28, 1999 (age 27) Kansas City, Missouri, U.S.
- Listed height: 6 ft 7 in (2.01 m)
- Listed weight: 215 lb (98 kg)

Career information
- High school: Saint Thomas Aquinas (Overland Park, Kansas); Link Year Prep (Branson, Missouri)
- College: UNC Greensboro (2018–2021); Eastern Washington (2021–2023)
- NBA draft: 2023: undrafted
- Playing career: 2023–present

Career history
- 2023–2024: Greensboro Swarm
- 2024–2025: Telekom Baskets Bonn

Career highlights
- First-team All-Big Sky (2023)
- Stats at NBA.com
- Stats at Basketball Reference

Angelo Allegri (born April 28, 1999) is an American professional basketball player who last played for Telekom Baskets Bonn of the Basketball Bundesliga. He played college basketball for the UNC Greensboro Spartans and Eastern Washington Eagles.

== High school career ==
Allegri was raised in Kansas City, Missouri. He originally attended Center High School. He later transferred to Saint Thomas Aquinas High School in Overland Park, Kansas ahead of his Junior year, and spent a postgraduate year at Link Year Prep in Branson, Missouri.

== College career ==
Allegri began his collegiate career with the UNC Greensboro Spartans where he averaged 7.9 points and 4.1 rebounds during his three seasons with the team. After the departure of Spartans head coach Wes Miller, Allegri transferred to the Eastern Washington Eagles in 2021. He played two seasons for the Eagles and was selected to the All-Big Sky Conference first-team in 2023.

== Professional career ==
Allegri worked out for the Charlotte Hornets on May 2, 2023, and suffered a foot injury the day afterwards which limited him to the one workout. After going undrafted on the 2023 NBA draft, he joined the Hornets for the 2023 NBA Summer League and on September 5, Allegri signed with them. However, he was waived on September 29, and on October 29, he signed with the Greensboro Swarm, the Hornets' NBA G League affiliate.

On June 18, 2024, Allegri signed with Telekom Baskets Bonn of the Basketball Bundesliga.
