= Joshua Obiesie =

German basketball player (born 2000)

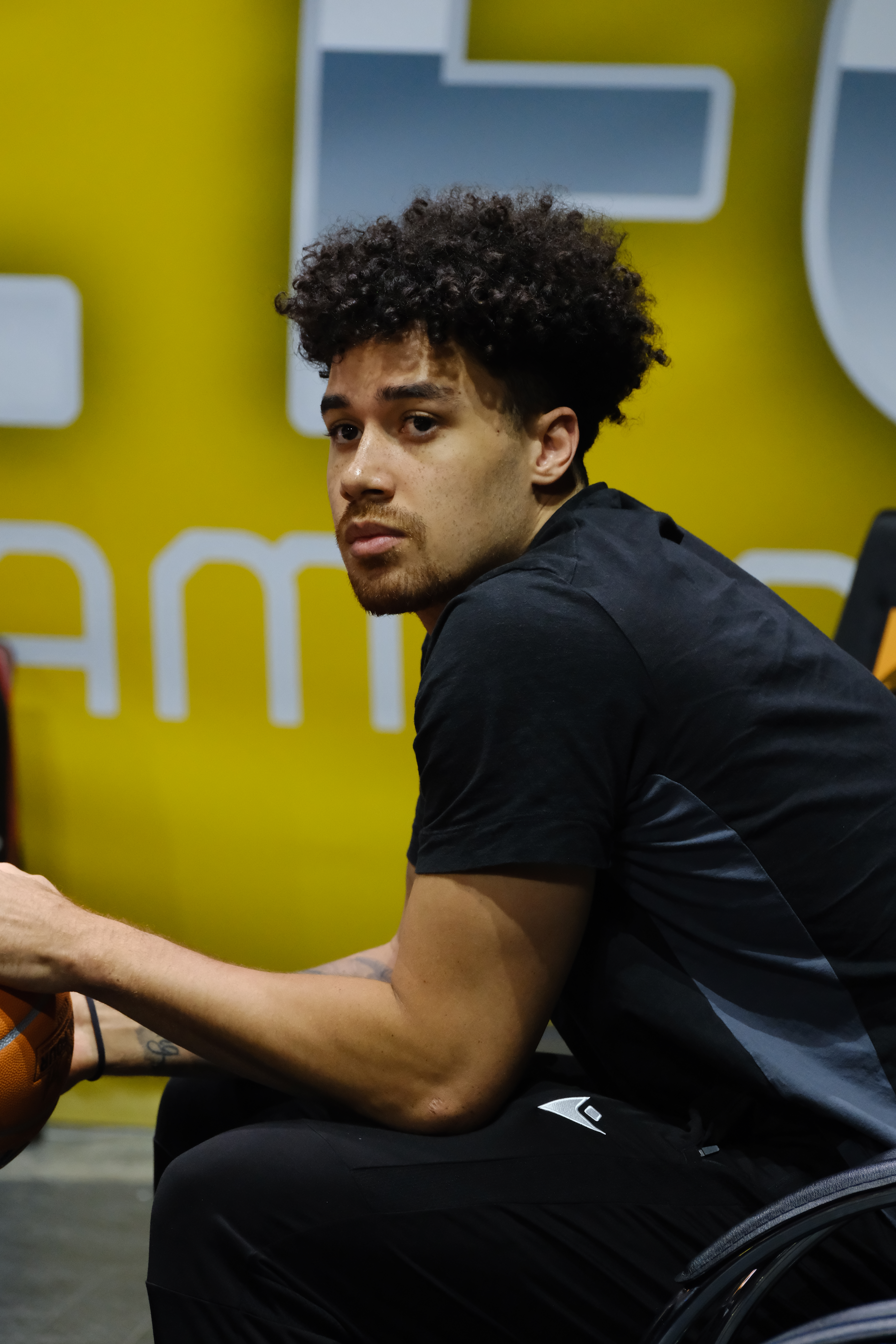
- Obiesie in 2025

No. 77 – Bamberg Baskets
- Position: Small forward
- League: Basketball Bundesliga

Personal information
- Born: 23 May 2000 (age 26) Munich, Germany
- Listed height: 1.98 m (6 ft 6 in)
- Listed weight: 86 kg (190 lb)

Career information
- NBA draft: 2019: undrafted
- Playing career: 2018–present

Career history
- 2018–2021: s.Oliver Würzburg
- 2021–2022: Bayern Munich
- 2022–2023: Fraport Skyliners
- 2023–2024: Rio Grande Valley Vipers
- 2024: JDA Dijon
- 2024–2025: AEK Athens
- 2025–2026: Löwen Braunschweig
- 2026–present: Bamberg Baskets

Career highlights
- Nike Hoop Summit (2019)
- Stats at Basketball Reference

Joshua Obiesie (born 23 May 2000) is a German professional basketball player for Bamberg Baskets of the Basketball Bundesliga (BBL).

== Early life and career ==
Since he played basketball at the under-10 level, Obiesie trained under the guidance of Robert Scheinberg, director of the International Basketball Academy Munich (IBAM). Through IBAM, he competed in the Jugend-Basketball-Bundesliga (JBBL), the German under-16 league, and the Nachwuchs-Basketball-Bundesliga (NBBL), the German under-19 league. In the 2016–17 season, Obiesie began playing for MTSV Schwabing, a senior team in the 1. Regionalliga, the fourth-tier German league. In February 2018, he was loaned to Brose Bamberg for the Munich qualifying tournament for the 2018 Adidas Next Generation Tournament, an international junior competition.

== Professional career ==
=== s.Oliver Würzburg (2018–2021) ===
On 23 November 2018, Obiesie signed a contract with s.Oliver Würzburg of the Basketball Bundesliga until 2022. During the season, he continued to play for IBAM in the NBBL and with MTSV Schwabing in the 1. Regionalliga. Obiesie made his professional debut for Würzburg on 12 December, recording eight points and seven rebounds in a 95–77 win over Prishtina in the FIBA Europe Cup. On 26 December, in his Bundesliga debut versus Bayern Munich, he posted 12 points, four assists, and three steals. On 6 February 2019, Obiesie scored a career-high 21 points, with four three-pointers, in a 92–83 FIBA Europe Cup victory over Szolnoki Olaj. On 27 February, he was named to the 2019 NBBL All-Star Game. Obiesie, on 12 April, took part in the Nike Hoop Summit, where he faced top American high school players. On 21 April, he declared for the 2019 NBA draft, but ended going undrafted.

=== Bayern Munich (2021–2022) ===
On 23 July 2021, Obiesie signed a three-year deal with Bayern Munich. He averaged 2.8 points per contest in 22 Bundesliga contests for the Munich side.

=== Fraport Skyliners (2022–2023) ===
On 19 July 2022, Obiese inked a two-year deal with fellow Bundesliga outfit Fraport Skyliners.

=== Rio Grande Valley Vipers (2023–2024) ===
On 2 August 2023, Obiesie signed with the Houston Rockets of the NBA. However, he was waived on 29 September and on 30 October he joined the Rio Grande Valley Vipers.

=== JDA Dijon (2024) ===
On 5 June 2024, Obiesie signed with JDA Dijon of the LNB Élite. He parted company with Dijon in late November 2024 following coach Laurent Legname's decision to do without Obiesie.

=== AEK Athens (2024–2025) ===
On November 29, 2024, Obiesie moved to Greek club AEK Athens.

=== Löwen Braunschweig (2025–2026) ===
On June 30, 2025, he signed with Löwen Braunschweig of the Basketball Bundesliga.

=== Bamberg Baskets (2026–present) ===
On July 1, 2026, he signed with BMA365 Bamberg Baskets of the Basketball Bundesliga (BBL).

== National team career ==
In 2018, Obiesie played for the German national under-18 team at the Albert Schweitzer Tournament. In seven games, he averaged 11.1 points, 3.4 rebounds, and 2.0 assists per game, leading Germany to a gold medal. In February 2019, Obiesie was called up by the senior German national team for 2019 FIBA World Cup qualification but never suited up. He made his national team debut in late February 2020 against Great Britain.
