= Vincent Valerio-Bodon =

Hungarian basketball player (born 2001)

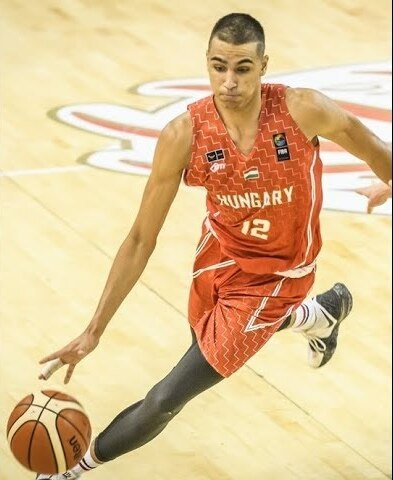

No. 27 – Budapest Honvéd
- Position: Power forward / small forward
- League: Nemzeti Bajnokság I/A

Personal information
- Born: 2 May 2001 (age 25) Santo Domingo, Dominican Republic
- Listed height: 6 ft 9 in (2.06 m)
- Listed weight: 210 lb (95 kg)

Career information
- NBA draft: 2023: undrafted
- Playing career: 2019–present

Career history
- 2019–2021: Atomerőmű SE
- 2021–2022: Debreceni EAC
- 2022–2023: Soproni KC
- 2023–2025: South Bay Lakers
- 2025: Rip City Remix
- 2025: Pistoia Basket 2000
- 2025–present: Budapest Honvéd

Career highlights
- Spanish Supercup winner (2025); NB I/A champion (2023); FIBA U20 European Challenger MVP (2023)
- Stats at NBA.com
- Stats at Basketball Reference

Vincent Laszlo Valerio-Bodon (born 2 May 2001) is a Hungarian professional basketball player for Budapest Honvéd of the Nemzeti Bajnokság I/A. He was born in Santo Domingo, Dominican Republic, but was raised in Hungary, and has chosen to represent the Hungarian national team.

== Early life ==
Valerio-Bodon began playing basketball at a young age in Hungary. He played for the youth team of Budapest Honvéd until 2019.

== Professional career ==
=== Hungary (2019–2023) ===
In 2019, Valerio-Bodon signed with Atomerőmű SE, competing in the Nemzeti Bajnokság I/A, playing for two years.

On 23 June 2021, Valerio-Bodon signed with DEAC.

On 5 July 2022, Valerio-Bodon signed with Soproni KC.

=== South Bay Lakers (2023–2025) ===
After going undrafted in the 2023 NBA draft, Valerio-Bodon joined the Boston Celtics for the 2023 NBA Summer League, On 7 September 2023, he signed with the Los Angeles Lakers, but was waived on 16 October. On 28 October, he joined the South Bay Lakers.

On 4 September 2024, Valerio-Bodon re-signed with Los Angeles, but was waived the next day. On 26 October, he re-joined South Bay.

== Career stats ==
Season	Team	League	GP	Min	FG%	3P%	FT%	Pts	Reb	Ast
2019–20	Atomerőmű SE	NB I/A	11	6.9	45.5	42.9	0.0	1.2	0.5	0.1
2020–21	Atomerőmű SE	NB I/A	21	19.8	43.9	17.9	70.4	5.3	3.6	1.2
2021–22	DEAC	NB I/A	28	19.3	44.1	31.2	66.7	5.6	3.4	1.2
2022–23	Soproni KC	NB I/A	30	25.7	50.3	41.2	87.9	8.2	4.1	1.8
2023–24	South Bay Lakers	NBA G League	35	17.8	41.6	32.7	92.9	5.7	2.5	1.2
