= Kameron Hankerson =

American basketball player (born 1998)

No. 6 – Gambusinos de Fresnillo
- Position: Shooting guard
- League: LNBP

Personal information
- Born: August 8, 1998 (age 28) Novi, Michigan, U.S.
- Listed height: 6 ft 5 in (1.96 m)
- Listed weight: 200 lb (91 kg)

Career information
- High school: Novi (Novi, Michigan)
- College: Green Bay (2016–2020)
- NBA draft: 2020: undrafted
- Playing career: 2020–present

Career history
- 2020–2021: Ehingen Urspring
- 2021–2022: Ovarense
- 2022–2024: Long Island Nets
- 2024: Windsor Express
- 2024: Correbasket UAT
- 2025–2026: Tryhoop Okayama
- 2026–present: Gambusinos de Fresnillo
- Stats at Basketball Reference

Kameron James Haynes Hankerson (born August 8, 1998) is an American professional basketball player for the Gambusinos de Fresnillo of the Mexican Liga Nacional de Baloncesto Profesional (LNBP). He played college basketball for the Green Bay Phoenix.

== Early life and high school career ==
Hankerson attended Novi High School in Novi, Michigan. As a junior, he averaged 9 points, 4 assists, 5 rebounds, and 2 blocks per game, earning All-Kensington Conference recognition. During his senior season, Hankerson had a partially torn lateral collateral ligament in his knee and missed the final month of the season. Hankerson was ranked the 16th best prospect in Michigan and signed with Green Bay in November 2015.

== College career ==
As a freshman, Hankerson averaged 3.1 points in eight minutes per game. Following the season, he spent much time in the gym and focused on eating right and lifting weights to get in shape. On March 2, 2018, Hankerson scored a career-high 36 points in a 93–81 win against Detroit Mercy in the first round of the Horizon League tournament. He averaged 10.7 points, 3.1 rebounds, and 2.6 assists per game as a sophomore, shooting 38.7 percent from three-point range. As a junior, Hankerson averaged 8.1 points per game on a team that finished 21–17 and reached the final of the CollegeInsider.com Postseason Tournament. He finished third on the team in scoring at 11.1 points per game as a senior, finishing his career with over 1,000 points.

== Professional career ==
On September 3, 2020, Hankerson signed his first professional contract with Ehingen Urspring of the German ProA.

=== Long Island Nets (2022–2024) ===
On November 4, 2022, Hankerson was named to the opening night roster for the Long Island Nets.

On October 6, 2023, Hankerson signed with the Brooklyn Nets, but was waived the same day. On October 28, he rejoined Long Island.

=== Windsor Express (2024) ===
In April 2024, Hankerson signed with the Windsor Express of the Basketball Super League.

=== Tryhoop Okayama (2025–present) ===
On February 7, 2025, Hankerson signed with the Tryhoop Okayama of the B.League in Japan.

== Personal life ==
Hankerson's younger brother Trendon plays basketball for Northern Illinois.
