= 2005–06 Memphis Tigers men's basketball team =

American college basketball season

2005–2006 Memphis Tigers men's basketball

Conference USA regular season and tournament champions

NCAA tournament, Elite Eight
- Conference: Conference USA

Ranking
- Coaches: No. 6
- AP: No. 4
- Record: 33–4 (13–1 C-USA)
- Head coach: John Calipari (6th season)
- Assistant coaches: Tony Barbee; Derek Kellogg; John Robic
- Home arena: FedExForum

2005–06 Conference USA men's basketball standings
	Conf.				Overall
Team	W		L	PCT	W		L	PCT
No. 4 Memphis†	13	–	1	.929	33	–	4	.892
No. 25 UAB	12	–	2	.857	24	–	7	.774
UTEP	11	–	3	.786	21	–	10	.677
Houston	9	–	5	.643	21	–	10	.677
UCF	7	–	7	.500	14	–	15	.483
Rice	6	–	8	.429	12	–	16	.429
Tulane	6	–	8	.429	12	–	17	.414
Tulsa	6	–	8	.429	11	–	17	.393
Marshall	5	–	9	.357	12	–	16	.429
SMU	4	–	10	.286	13	–	16	.448
Southern Miss	3	–	11	.214	10	–	21	.323
East Carolina	2	–	12	.143	8	–	20	.286
† 2006 C-USA Tournament winner Rankings from AP Poll

The 2005–06 Memphis Tigers men's basketball team represented the University of Memphis in the 2005–06 college basketball season, the 85th season of Tiger basketball. The Tigers were coached by sixth-year head coach John Calipari, and they played their home games at the FedExForum in Memphis, Tennessee.

== Recruiting ==
College recruiting information
Name	Hometown	School	Height	Weight	Commit date
Antonio Anderson; SG	Laurinburg, NC	Laurinburg Prep	6 ft 5 in (1.96 m)	190 lb (86 kg)	May 7, 2004
Antonio Anderson; SG	Recruit ratings: Scout: Rivals:				
Kareem Cooper; PF	Laurinburg, NC	Laurinburg Prep	6 ft 10 in (2.08 m)	225 lb (102 kg)	Nov 14, 2004
Kareem Cooper; PF	Recruit ratings: Scout: Rivals:				
Chris Douglas-Roberts; PG	Detroit, MI	Northwestern HS	6 ft 5 in (1.96 m)	165 lb (75 kg)	Jul 10, 2004
Chris Douglas-Roberts; PG	Recruit ratings: Scout: Rivals:				
Robert Dozier; SF	Laurinburg, NC	Laurinburg, NC	6 ft 8 in (2.03 m)	190 lb (86 kg)	Sep 9, 2004
Robert Dozier; SF	Recruit ratings: Scout: Rivals:				
Ricky Sanchez; SF	Bradenton, FL	IMG Academy	6 ft 11 in (2.11 m)	210 lb (95 kg)	Sep 22, 2004
Ricky Sanchez; SF	Recruit ratings: Scout: Rivals:				
Shawne Williams; SF	Laurinburg, NC	Laurinburg, NC	6 ft 8 in (2.03 m)	215 lb (98 kg)	Jan 9, 2003
Shawne Williams; SF	Recruit ratings: Scout: Rivals:				
Overall recruit ranking: Scout: 6 Rivals: 7
Note: In many cases, Scout, Rivals, 247Sports, On3, and ESPN may conflict in their listings of height and weight.; In these cases, the average was taken. ESPN grades are on a 100-point scale.; Sources: "Memphis Basketball Commitments". Rivals.; "2005 Memphis Basketball Commits". Scout.; "ESPN". ESPN.; "Scout.com Team Recruiting Rankings". Scout.; "2005 Team Ranking". Rivals.

== Roster ==
2005–06 Memphis Tigers men's basketball team
Players
Coaches

Pos.	#	Name	Height	Weight	Year	Hometown
G	15	Andre Allen	5 ft 10 in (1.78 m)	205 lb (93 kg)	So	Memphis, Tennessee
G	12	Antonio Anderson	6 ft 6 in (1.98 m)	190 lb (86 kg)	Fr	Lynn, Massachusetts
F	10	Rodney Carney	6 ft 7 in (2.01 m)	205 lb (93 kg)	Sr	Indianapolis, IN
C	42	Kareem Cooper	6 ft 11 in (2.11 m)	285 lb (129 kg)	Fr	Washington, D.C.
C	32	Joey Dorsey	6 ft 9 in (2.06 m)	265 lb (120 kg)	So	Baltimore, Maryland
G	3	Chris Douglas-Roberts	6 ft 6 in (1.98 m)	180 lb (82 kg)	Fr	Detroit, Michigan
F	2	Robert Dozier	6 ft 9 in (2.06 m)	205 lb (93 kg)	Fr	Lithonia, Georgia
G	20	Travis Long	5 ft 8 in (1.73 m)	135 lb (61 kg)	Fr	Dumont, New Jersey
G	11	Chance McGrady	6 ft 2 in (1.88 m)	180 lb (82 kg)	Fr	Auburndale, Florida
F	14	Simplice Njoya	6 ft 10 in (2.08 m)	245 lb (111 kg)	Sr	Yaoundé, Cameroon
G	30	Jared Sandridge	6 ft 2 in (1.88 m)	170 lb (77 kg)	Jr	Memphis, Tennessee
F	50	Almamy Thiero	6 ft 10 in (2.08 m)	255 lb (116 kg)		Mali, West Africa
G	0	Clyde Wade	6 ft 0 in (1.83 m)	185 lb (84 kg)	RS Sr	Memphis, Tennessee
G	35	Darius Washington Jr.	6 ft 2 in (1.88 m)	195 lb (88 kg)	So	Winter Park, FL
F	4	Shawne Williams	6 ft 9 in (2.06 m)	225 lb (102 kg)	Fr	Memphis, TN
F	1	Waki Williams	6 ft 9 in (2.06 m)	205 lb (93 kg)	Sr	Cincinnati, OH

Head coach

- John Calipari (Clarion)

Assistant coach(es)

- Tony Barbee (UMass)
- Derek Kellogg (UMass)
- John Robic (Denison)

Legend

- (C) Team captain
- (S) Suspended
- (I) Ineligible
- (W) Walk-on
- Injured
- Current redshirt

Roster

== Schedule ==
Date time, TV	Rank^{#}	Opponent^{#}	Result	Record	Site (attendance) city, state
Regular season
November 15, 2005*; 7:00 pm	No. 12	Milwaukee; NIT Season Tip-Off	W 79–52	1–0	FedExForum (10,165); Memphis, TN
November 17, 2005*; 9:00 pm, ESPN2	No. 12	at No. 15 Alabama; NIT Season Tip-Off	W 87–76	2–0	Coleman Coliseum (4,522); Tuscaloosa, AL
November 23, 2005*; 8:00 pm, ESPN2	No. 11	vs. No. 16 UCLA; NIT Season Tip-Off	W 88–80	3-0	Madison Square Garden (9,766); New York, NY
November 25, 2005*; 6:00 pm, ESPN2	No. 11	vs. No. 1 Duke; NIT Season Tip-Off	L 67–70	3–1	Madison Square Garden (12,129); New York, NY
November 28, 2005*; 7:00 pm, WLMT	No. 9	Lamar	W 108–83	4–1	FedExForum (11,244); Memphis, TN
November 30, 2005*; 7:00 pm, WLMT	No. 9	Jackson State	W 97–70	5–1	FedExForum (12,384); Memphis, TN
December 3, 2005*; 2:00 pm, ESPN	No. 9	at Cincinnati	W 91–81	6–1	Fifth Third Arena (9,440); Cincinnati, OH
December 10, 2005*; 6:30 pm	No. 7	at Providence	W 97–89	7–1	Dunkin' Donuts Center (8,665); Providence, RI
December 17, 2005*; 2:30 pm, FSN	No. 5	at Ole Miss	W 72–49	8–1	Tad Smith Coliseum (8,037); Oxford, MS
December 20, 2005*; 7:00 pm, WLMT	No. 4	Louisiana Tech	W 76–58	9–1	FedExForum (13,761); Memphis, TN
December 27, 2005*; 6:00 pm, ESPN2	No. 4	No. 8 Gonzaga	W 83–72	10–1	FedExForum (18,208); Memphis, TN
December 30, 2005*; 7:00 pm, WLMT	No. 4	Purdue	W 90–70	11–1	FedExForum (16,835); Memphis, TN
January 2, 2006*; 1:30 pm, ESPN	No. 4	No. 15 Texas	L 58–69	11–2	FedExForum (18,035); Memphis, TN
January 4, 2006*; 7:00 pm, WLMT	No. 4	Middle Tennessee	W 83–50	12–2	FedExForum (13,525); Memphis, TN
January 8, 2006*; 1:00 pm, WLMT	No. 4	Winthrop	W 73–63	13–2	FedExForum (14,171); Memphis, TN
January 11, 2006; 6:00 pm, CSTV	No. 5	at East Carolina	W 77–67	14–2 (1–0)	Williams Arena at Minges Coliseum (7,553); Greenville, NC
January 14, 2006; 7:00 pm, WLMT	No. 5	SMU	W 73–53	15–2 (2–0)	FedExForum (14,443); Memphis, TN
January 18, 2006*; 7:00 pm, CSTV	No. 4	Tennessee	W 88–79	16–2	FedExForum (18,144); Memphis, TN
January 21, 2006; 4:00 pm, WLMT	No. 4	at Southern Miss	W 85–68	17–2 (3–0)	Reed Green Coliseum (6,412); Hattiesburg, MS
January 26, 2006; 7:00 pm, CSTV	No. 3	UAB	W 73–66	18–2 (4–0)	FedExForum (15,529); Memphis, TN
January 28, 2006; 12:00 pm, CSTV	No. 3	UCF	W 94–61	19–2 (5–0)	FedExForum (15,177); Memphis, TN
February 1, 2006; 7:00 pm, WLMT	No. 3	at Tulsa	W 84–61	20–2 (6–0)	Reynolds Center (6,740); Tulsa, OK
February 4, 2006; 6:00 pm, WLMT	No. 3	at Rice	W 84–79	21–2 (7–0)	Autry Court (3,710); Houston, TX
February 11, 2006; 3:00 pm, CSTV	No. 3	at Marshall	W 91–81	22–2 (8–0)	Cam Henderson Center (9,048); Huntington, WV
February 14, 2006; 7:00 pm, WLMT	No. 3	Southern Miss	W 80–41	23–2 (9–0)	FedExforum (15,441); Memphis, TN
February 18, 2006; 7:00 pm, WLMT	No. 3	at Tulane	W 105–65	24–2 (10–0)	Avron B. Fogelman Arena (2,582); New Orleans, LA
February 22, 2006; 9:00 pm, ESPN2	No. 4	UTEP	W 66–56	25–2 (11–0)	FedExForum (15,073); Memphis, TN
February 25, 2006; 7:00 pm, WLMT	No. 4	Tulsa	W 78–67	26–2 (12–0)	FedExForum (17,658); Memphis, TN
March 2, 2006; 8:30 pm, ESPN2	No. 3	at UAB	L 74–80	26–3 (12–1)	Bartow Arena (8,500); Birmingham, AL
March 4, 2006; 8:00 pm, CSTV	No. 3	Houston	W 69–62	27–3 (13–1)	FedExForum (17,061); Memphis, TN
Conference USA Tournament
March 9, 2006; 6:00 pm, CSTV	(1) No. 5	vs. (8) Tulane; Quarterfinals	W 75–56	28–3	FedExForum (11,343); Memphis, TN
March 10, 2006; 3:30 pm, CSTV	(1) No. 5	vs. No. 4 Houston; Semifinals	W 68–54	29–3	FedExForum (12,524); Memphis, TN
March 11, 2006; 10:35 am, CBS	(1) No. 5	vs. (2) No. 24 UAB; Championship	W 57–46	30–3	FedExForum (16,607); Memphis, TN
NCAA tournament
March 17, 2006*; 2:00 pm, CBS	(1 O) No. 4	vs. (16 O) Oral Roberts; First Round	W 94–78	31–3	American Airlines Center (19,028); Dallas, TX
03/19/06*; 1:15 pm, CBS	(1 O) No. 4	vs. (9 O) Bucknell; Second Round	W 72–56	32–3	American Airlines Center (19,251); Dallas, TX
03/23/06*; 6:30 pm, CBS	(1 O) No. 4	vs. (13 O) Bradley; Sweet Sixteen	W 80–64	33–3	Oakland Arena (19,596); Oakland, CA
03/25/06*; 6:05 pm, CBS	(1 O) No. 4	vs. (2 O) No. 7 UCLA; Elite Eight	L 45–50	33–4	Oakland Arena (19,689); Oakland, CA
*Non-conference game. (#) Tournament seedings in parentheses. All times are in Central Time.
