= 2005–06 Bucknell Bison men's basketball team =

American college basketball season

2005–06 Bucknell Bison men's basketball

Patriot League tournament champions

NCAA tournament, second round
- Conference: Patriot League

Ranking
- Coaches: No. 25
- Record: 27–5 (14–0 Patriot)
- Head coach: Pat Flannery (12th season)
- Assistant coach: Mark Prosser (3rd season)
- Home arena: Sojka Pavilion

2005–06 Patriot League men's basketball standings
	Conf.				Overall
Team	W		L	PCT	W		L	PCT
Bucknell †	14	–	0	1.000	27	–	5	.844
Holy Cross	11	–	3	.786	20	–	12	.625
Lehigh	11	–	3	.786	19	–	12	.613
American	7	–	7	.500	12	–	17	.414
Lafayette	5	–	9	.357	11	–	17	.393
Colgate	4	–	10	.286	10	–	19	.345
Navy	3	–	11	.214	10	–	18	.357
Army	1	–	13	.071	5	–	22	.185
† 2006 Patriot League tournament winner

The 2005–06 Bucknell Bison men's basketball team represented Bucknell University during the 2005–06 NCAA Division I men's basketball season. The Bison, led by head coach Pat Flannery, played their home games at Sojka Pavilion and were members of the Patriot League. They finished the season 27–5, 14–0 in Patriot League play to win the conference regular season title by three games. They won the Patriot League tournament to earn an automatic bid to the 2006 NCAA tournament where they defeated No. 8 seed Arkansas in the opening round. In the round of 32, the Bison were beaten by No. 1 seed Memphis. This was the second straight season the Bison reached the round of 32 of the NCAA Tournament.

== Roster ==
2005–06 Bucknell Bison men's basketball team
Players
Coaches

Pos.	#	Name	Height	Weight	Year	Hometown
F	1	Darren Mastropaolo	6 ft 8 in (2.03 m)	230 lb (104 kg)	So	Falmouth, Maine
G	2	Rob Thomas	6 ft 4 in (1.93 m)	190 lb (86 kg)	So	Houston, Texas
G	3	Charles Lee	6 ft 3 in (1.91 m)	215 lb (98 kg)	Sr	Gaithersburg, Maryland
F	4	Donald Brown	6 ft 5 in (1.96 m)	200 lb (91 kg)	Jr	Central Islip, New York
G	5	Abe Badmus	5 ft 11 in (1.8 m)	175 lb (79 kg)	Jr	Chicago, Illinois
G	11	John Griffin	6 ft 0 in (1.83 m)	170 lb (77 kg)	So	Philadelphia, Pennsylvania
G	12	Kevin Bettencourt	6 ft 2 in (1.88 m)	185 lb (84 kg)	Sr	Peabody, Massachusetts
F	21	John Clark	6 ft 7 in (2.01 m)	200 lb (91 kg)	Jr	Tulsa, Oklahoma
F	22	Holland Mack	6 ft 5 in (1.96 m)	192 lb (87 kg)	Sr	Paterson, New Jersey
F	25	Andrew Morrison	6 ft 6 in (1.98 m)	215 lb (98 kg)	So	Sea Isle City, New Jersey
C	32	Chris McNaughton	6 ft 11 in (2.11 m)	235 lb (107 kg)	Jr	Leutershausen, Germany
C	44	Tarik Viaer-McClymont	6 ft 7 in (2.01 m)	265 lb (120 kg)	Sr	Springfield Gardens, New York

Head coach

- Pat Flannery (Bucknell)

Assistant coach(es)

Legend

- (C) Team captain
- (S) Suspended
- (I) Ineligible
- (W) Walk-on
- Injured
- Current redshirt

Roster

== Schedule and results ==
Date time, TV	Rank^{#}	Opponent^{#}	Result	Record	Site (attendance) city, state
Regular season
Nov 18, 2005*		at Rider	W 56–54	1–0	Alumni Gymnasium (1,650); Lawrenceville, New Jersey
Nov 22, 2005*		at No. 17 Syracuse	W 74–69	2–0	Carrier Dome (20,490); Syracuse, New York
Nov 26, 2005*		Yale	W 87–60	3–0	Sojka Pavilion (2,950); Lewisburg, Pennsylvania
Nov 30, 2005*		at Niagara	W 66–63	4–0	Gallagher Center (2,039); Lewiston, New York
Dec 3, 2005*		at DePaul	W 57–52	5–0	Allstate Arena (7,746); Rosemont, Illinois
Dec 6, 2005*		No. 4 Villanova	L 60–79	5–1	Sojka Pavilion (4,433); Lewisburg, Pennsylvania
Dec 17, 2005*		Holy Cross	W 83–39	6–1	Sojka Pavilion (2,598); Lewisburg, Pennsylvania
Dec 19, 2005*		Haverford	W 76–44	7–1	Sojka Pavilion (1,340); Lewisburg, Pennsylvania
Dec 21, 2005*		Saint Joseph's	W 63–51	8–1	Sojka Pavilion (4,252); Lewisburg, Pennsylvania
Dec 28, 2005*		vs. Boston University; Cable Car Classic	W 63–57	9–1	Leavey Center (2,085); Santa Clara, California
Dec 29, 2005*		at Santa Clara; Cable Car Classic	L 68–77	9–2	Leavey Center (1,875); Santa Clara, California
Jan 2, 2006*; ESPN		at No. 1 Duke	L 50–84	9–3	Cameron Indoor Stadium (9,314); Durham, North Carolina
Jan 7, 2006		at Navy	W 74–52	10–3 (1–0)	Alumni Hall (2,891); Annapolis, Maryland
Jan 11, 2006		at American	W 58–50	11–3 (2–0)	Bender Arena (1,389); Washington D.C.
Jan 14, 2006; CSTV		Holy Cross	W 56–42	12–3 (3–0)	Sojka Pavilion (4,102); Lewisburg, Pennsylvania
Jan 18, 2006		Lafayette	W 62–32	13–3 (4–0)	Sojka Pavilion (3,967); Lewisburg, Pennsylvania
Jan 21, 2006		Colgate	W 62–43	14–3 (5–0)	Sojka Pavilion (4,157); Lewisburg, Pennsylvania
Jan 25, 2006		at Lehigh	W 59–54	15–3 (6–0)	Stabler Arena (3,556); Bethlehem, Pennsylvania
Jan 28, 2006		Navy	W 81–47	16–3 (7–0)	Sojka Pavilion (4,180); Lewisburg, Pennsylvania
Feb 1, 2006		at Army	W 67–54	17–3 (8–0)	Christl Arena (518); West Point, New York
Feb 4, 2006		at Colgate	W 68–59	18–3 (9–0)	Cotterell Court (1,052); Hamilton, New York
Feb 8, 2006		American	W 74–57	19–3 (10–0)	Sojka Pavilion (3,413); Lewisburg, Pennsylvania
Feb 11, 2006		at Holy Cross	W 57–52	20–3 (11–0)	Hart Center (4,000); Worcester, Massachusetts
Feb 15, 2006; CSTV	No. 24	at Lafayette	W 69–49	21–3 (12–0)	Kirby Sports Center (3,184); Easton, Pennsylvania
Feb 18, 2006*; ESPN2	No. 24	at Northern Iowa; BracketBusters	L 61–65 ^{2OT}	21–4	UNI-Dome (8,442); Cedar Falls, Iowa
Feb 22, 2006		Lehigh	W 81–70	23–4 (13–0)	Sojka Pavilion (4,136); Lewisburg, Pennsylvania
Feb 25, 2006		Army	W 70–47	23–4 (14–0)	Sojka Pavilion (4,174); Lewisburg, Pennsylvania
Patriot League tournament
Mar 3, 2006*		Army; Quarterfinals	W 59–47	24–4	Sojka Pavilion (3,946); Lewisburg, Pennsylvania
Mar 5, 2006*		American; Semifinals	W 64–50	25–4	Sojka Pavilion (3,833); Lewisburg, Pennsylvania
Mar 10, 2006*; ESPN2		Holy Cross; Championship Game	W 74–59	26–4	Sojka Pavilion (4,110); Lewisburg, Pennsylvania
NCAA tournament
Mar 17, 2006*; CBS	(9 W)	vs. (8 W) Arkansas; First Round	W 59–55	27–4	American Airlines Center (19,028); Dallas, Texas
Mar 19, 2006*; CBS	(9 W)	vs. (1 W) No. 4 Memphis; Second Round	L 56–72	27–5	American Airlines Center (19,251); Dallas, Texas
*Non-conference game. ^{#}Rankings from AP Poll. (#) Tournament seedings in parentheses. S=Syracuse. All times are in Eastern Time.

== Awards and honors ==
- Charles Lee – Patriot League Player of the Year
