= 2004–05 Bucknell Bison men's basketball team =

American college basketball season

2004–05 Bucknell Bison men's basketball

Patriot League tournament champions

NCAA tournament, second round
- Conference: Patriot League
- Record: 23–10 (10–4 Patriot)
- Head coach: Pat Flannery (11th season)
- Assistant coach: Mark Prosser (2nd season)
- Home arena: Sojka Pavilion

2004–05 Patriot League men's basketball standings
	Conf.				Overall
Team	W		L	PCT	W		L	PCT
Holy Cross	13	–	1	.929	25	–	7	.781
Bucknell †	10	–	4	.714	23	–	10	.697
American	8	–	6	.571	16	–	12	.571
Lehigh	7	–	7	.500	14	–	15	.483
Colgate	7	–	7	.500	12	–	16	.429
Navy	5	–	9	.357	9	–	19	.321
Lafayette	5	–	9	.357	9	–	19	.321
Army	1	–	13	.071	3	–	24	.111
† 2005 Patriot League tournament winner

The 2004–05 Bucknell Bison men's basketball team represented Bucknell University during the 2004–05 NCAA Division I men's basketball season. The Bison, led by head coach Pat Flannery, played their home games at Sojka Pavilion and were members of the Patriot League. They finished the season 23–10, 10–4 in Patriot League play to finish second in the conference regular season. They won the Patriot League tournament to earn an automatic bid to the 2005 NCAA tournament, where they upset No. 3 seed Kansas in the opening round. In the round of 32, the Bison were beaten by No. 6 seed Wisconsin.

== Roster ==
2004–05 Bucknell Bison men's basketball team
Players
Coaches

Pos.	#	Name	Height	Weight	Year	Hometown
F	1	Darren Mastropaolo	6 ft 8 in (2.03 m)	230 lb (104 kg)	Fr	Falmouth, Maine
G	2	Rob Thomas	6 ft 4 in (1.93 m)	190 lb (86 kg)	Fr	Houston, Texas
G	3	Charles Lee	6 ft 3 in (1.91 m)	215 lb (98 kg)	Jr	Gaithersburg, Maryland
F	4	Donald Brown	6 ft 5 in (1.96 m)	200 lb (91 kg)	So	Central Islip, New York
G	5	Abe Badmus	5 ft 11 in (1.8 m)	175 lb (79 kg)	So	Chicago, Illinois
G	11	John Griffin	6 ft 0 in (1.83 m)	170 lb (77 kg)	Fr	Philadelphia, Pennsylvania
G	12	Kevin Bettencourt	6 ft 2 in (1.88 m)	185 lb (84 kg)	Jr	Peabody, Massachusetts
F	21	John Clark	6 ft 7 in (2.01 m)	200 lb (91 kg)	So	Tulsa, Oklahoma
F	22	Holland Mack	6 ft 5 in (1.96 m)	192 lb (87 kg)	Jr	Paterson, New Jersey
F	25	Andrew Morrison	6 ft 6 in (1.98 m)	215 lb (98 kg)	Fr	Sea Isle City, New Jersey
F	31	Chris Niesz	6 ft 7 in (2.01 m)	197 lb (89 kg)	Sr	Middletown, New Jersey
C	32	Chris McNaughton	6 ft 11 in (2.11 m)	235 lb (107 kg)	So	Leutershausen, Germany
C	44	Tarik Viaer-McClymont	6 ft 7 in (2.01 m)	265 lb (120 kg)	Jr	Springfield Gardens, New York

Head coach

- Pat Flannery (Bucknell)

Assistant coach(es)

Legend

- (C) Team captain
- (S) Suspended
- (I) Ineligible
- (W) Walk-on
- Injured
- Current redshirt

Roster

== Schedule and results ==
Date time, TV	Rank^{#}	Opponent^{#}	Result	Record	Site (attendance) city, state
Regular season
Nov 11, 2004*		vs. Princeton	L 48–61	0–1	Carrier Dome (18,923); Syracuse, New York
Nov 12, 2004*		vs. Northern Colorado	W 67–54	1–1	Carrier Dome (20,176); Syracuse, New York
Nov 19, 2004*		Rider	W 69–50	2–1	Sojka Pavilion (1,683); Lewisburg, Pennsylvania
Nov 22, 2004*		Saint Francis (PA)	L 65–70	2–2	Sojka Pavilion (1,257); Lewisburg, Pennsylvania
Nov 26, 2004*		vs. Stephen F. Austin	W 62–49	3–2	Hilton Coliseum (9,632); Ames, Iowa
Nov 27, 2004*		at Iowa State	L 55–62	3–3	Hilton Coliseum (8,914); Ames, Iowa
Dec 1, 2004*		at Penn	L 52–65	3–4	Palestra (2,315); Philadelphia, Pennsylvania
Dec 4, 2004*		at Yale	W 73–65 ^{OT}	4–4	Payne Whitney Gymnasium (1,034); New Haven, Connecticut
Dec 7, 2004*		Robert Morris	W 60–45	5–4	Sojka Pavilion (1,217); Lewisburg, Pennsylvania
Dec 18, 2004*		at Cornell	W 59–44	6–4	Newman Arena (449); Ithaca, New York
Dec 22, 2004*		Niagara	W 76–74	7–4	Sojka Pavilion (1,208); Lewisburg, Pennsylvania
Dec 28, 2004*		at Saint Joseph's	W 69–62	8–4	Hagan Arena (3,200); Philadelphia, Pennsylvania
Jan 2, 2005*		at No. 10 Pittsburgh	W 69–66	9–4	Petersen Events Center (8,351); Pittsburgh, Pennsylvania
Jan 8, 2005		Holy Cross	W 59–43	10–4 (1–0)	Sojka Pavilion (3,897); Lewisburg, Pennsylvania
Jan 12, 2005		at Colgate	W 71–69	11–4 (2–0)	Cotterell Court (252); Hamilton, New York
Jan 15, 2005		Army	W 63–46	12–4 (3–0)	Sojka Pavilion (1,329); Lewisburg, Pennsylvania
Jan 21, 2005		Lafayette	W 71–54	13–4 (4–0)	Sojka Pavilion (3,502); Lewisburg, Pennsylvania
Jan 23, 2005		Lehigh	W 65–63	14–4 (5–0)	Sojka Pavilion (1,825); Lewisburg, Pennsylvania
Jan 28, 2005		at American	L 59–68	14–5 (5–1)	Bender Arena (2,391); Washington, D.C.
Jan 30, 2005		at Navy	L 62–66	14–6 (5–2)	Alumni Hall (1,027); Annapolis, Maryland
Feb 4, 2005		at Lafayette	W 89–69	15–6 (6–2)	Kirby Sports Center (3,112); Easton, Pennsylvania
Feb 6, 2005		at Lehigh	L 54–57	15–7 (6–3)	Stabler Arena (1,767); Bethlehem, Pennsylvania
Feb 11, 2005		American	W 65–52	16–7 (7–3)	Sojka Pavilion (3,230); Lewisburg, Pennsylvania
Feb 13, 2005		Navy	W 71–60	17–7 (8–3)	Sojka Pavilion (2,852); Lewisburg, Pennsylvania
Feb 15, 2005*		at No. 25 Villanova	L 51–89	17–8	Finneran Pavilion (6,500); Philadelphia, Pennsylvania
Feb 19, 2005		at Army	W 69–55	18–8 (9–3)	Christl Arena (883); West Point, New York
Feb 23, 2005		at Holy Cross	L 54–69	18–9 (9–4)	Hart Center (3,512); Worcester, Massachusetts
Feb 26, 2005		Colgate	W 60–59	19–9 (10–4)	Sojka Pavilion (2,989); Lewisburg, Pennsylvania
Patriot League tournament
Mar 4, 2005*	(2)	(7) Lafayette; Quarterfinals	W 70–34	20–9	Sojka Pavilion (3,032); Lewisburg, Pennsylvania
Mar 6, 2005*	(2)	(3) American; Semifinals	W 53–35	21–9	Sojka Pavilion (3,212); Lewisburg, Pennsylvania
Mar 11, 2005*	(2)	at (1) Holy Cross; Championship game	W 61–57	22–9	Hart Center (3,788); Worcester, Massachusetts
NCAA tournament
Mar 18, 2005*	(14 S)	vs. (3 S) No. 12 Kansas; First round	W 64–63	23–9	Ford Center (18,567); Oklahoma City, Oklahoma
Mar 20, 2005*	(14 S)	vs. (6 S) No. 20 Wisconsin; Second round	L 62–71	23–10	Ford Center (18,567); Oklahoma City, Oklahoma
*Non-conference game. ^{#}Rankings from AP Poll. (#) Tournament seedings in parentheses. S=Syracuse. All times are in Eastern Time.
