= Battle for the Bones =

Sports rivalry

Memphis–UAB rivalry
- Memphis Tigers UAB Blazers
- Sport: Football, basketball, others
- First meeting: 1984

Locations of Memphis and UAB

The Battle for the Bones is a sports rivalry between the University of Alabama at Birmingham Blazers and the University of Memphis Tigers. The two NCAA Division I schools compete in various sports, with men's basketball and college football in particular being prominent.

The rivalry began in 1984, when the two schools first met in men's basketball. Memphis currently leads this series 41–13. The football rivalry began in 1997. Since 2006 it has been known as the "Battle for the Bones" due to its trophy, a bronze rack of ribs.

The future of the rivalry was unclear as Memphis joined the American Athletic Conference in 2013 during the 2010–2013 Big East Conference realignment. However, the series continued semi-regularly in basketball after the Tigers departure from Conference USA. However, in October 2021, the UAB Blazers accepted an invitation to join the American Athletic Conference, thus renewing the rivalry and trophy as regular conference match-ups.

== Men's basketball ==
Memphis–UAB men's basketball rivalry
- Memphis Tigers UAB Blazers
- Sport: College basketball
- First meeting: February 2, 1984; No. 9 Memphis 53 – UAB 51
- Latest meeting: February 22, 2026; UAB 78 – Memphis 67

Statistics
- Total meetings: 57
- All-time series: Memphis, 41–13
- Largest victory: Memphis by 38* (March 8, 2008)
- Longest win streak: Memphis, 17* (January 26, 2006–December 10, 2016)
- Current win streak: UAB, 1 (February 22, 2026–present)

The Memphis–UAB men's basketball rivalry has the longest history of all their sports, and tends to be the most intense and heated affair. The first matchup between the Memphis Tigers and UAB Blazers was played in 1984, when the teams first met in basketball. The two teams have played at least twice a year since 1992, when they both moved to the Great Midwest Conference and later to Conference USA.

Head coach Gene Bartow was influential in both programs. He coached Memphis (then Memphis State) from 1970 to 1974, and in 1978 he became the first head coach of UAB's new program, which he led until 1996. His long tenure and success with the Blazers have led to him being known as the "Father of UAB Athletics".

=== Notable games ===
March 17, 1985†: In only the second meeting between two schools, 2nd-seed Memphis took on 7th-seed UAB in the Second round of the 1985 NCAA Division I men's basketball tournament. The Blazers, led by former Memphis coach Gene Bartow in their fifth consecutive NCAA appearance, played the Tigers closely in a game that had to go into overtime. Despite the best effort from UAB, Memphis would win 67–66 and go onto the Final Four.

March 10, 2006: After splitting the regular season series, the Blazers and Tigers met in the 2006 Conference USA men's basketball tournament final hosted at FedExForum. The John Calipari lead Tigers ultimately would win the game 57–46, clinching the first Conference USA title for Memphis.

February 16, 2008†: The #1-ranked Memphis Tigers were nearly upset before pulling out a 79–78 win. As the Tigers were down by 8 points with 2 minutes left, they went on a 9–1 run. After the conclusion of the game, an altercation between Memphis players and UAB fans occurred. Ultimately, people in the stands began booing the Memphis players off the court and throwing drinks and shakers at them as the players were escorted off the court by local police officers.

† Denotes game vacated by Memphis

=== Game results ===
Rankings are from the AP poll (1936–present)

UAB victories	Memphis victories	Vacated wins (Note: Memphis has vacated all NCAA Tournament wins and loses between 1982 until 1986, including the game against UAB during that period. Memphis has also vacated all of its victories from the 2007–08 season. These 38 wins are not included in Memphis's all-time record, nor is the victory against UAB during this season counted in the series record between the two teams.)

No.	Date	Location	Winner	Score
1	February 4, 1984	Mid-South Coliseum	No. 9 Memphis State	53–51
2	March 17, 1985^{A}	Hofheinz Pavilion	No. 5 Memphis State^{†}	67–66^{OT}
3	March 14, 1991	Mid-South Coliseum	Memphis State	82–76
4	January 1, 1992	UAB Arena	Memphis State	67–63
5	February 22, 1992	Pyramid Arena	Memphis State	63–58
6	March 12, 1992^{B}	Chicago Stadium	Memphis State	79–67
7	January 16, 1993	UAB Arena	UAB	50–47
8	January 30, 1993	UAB Arena	Memphis State	69–53
9	January 16, 1994	UAB Arena	No. 22 UAB	85–57
10	February 12, 1994	Pyramid Arena	Memphis State	58–53
11	March 10, 1994^{C}	Shoemaker Center	Memphis State	91–86
12	January 21, 1995	UAB Arena	UAB	80–63
13	January 28, 1995	Pyramid Arena	Memphis	74–67
14	January 24, 1996	Pyramid Arena	No. 12 Memphis	86–77
15	January 25, 1997	Bartow Arena	UAB	51–48
16	January 22, 1998	Pyramid Arena	Memphis	86–70
17	February 8, 1998	Bartow Arena	UAB	88–77
18	January 2, 1999	Pyramid Arena	UAB	91–83
19	February 11, 1999	Bartow Arena	Memphis	78–75
20	January 26, 2000	Pyramid Arena	Memphis	84–70
21	February 16, 2000	Bartow Arena	UAB	102–75
22	January 27, 2001	Bartow Arena	Memphis	76–73^{OT}
23	February 19, 2001	Pyramid Arena	Memphis	86–69
24	January 23, 2002	Pyramid Arena	Memphis	102–81
25	February 8, 2002	Bartow Arena	UAB	64–46
26	February 15, 2003	Pyramid Arena	Memphis	94–70
27	March 8, 2003	Bartow Arena	No. 18 Memphis	90–79
28	February 21, 2004	Pyramid Arena	No. 23 Memphis	73–66
29	January 22, 2005	Bartow Arena	UAB	73–70
30	January 26, 2006	FedExForum	No. 3 Memphis	73–66

No.	Date	Location	Winner	Score
31	March 2, 2006	Bartow Arena	UAB	80–74
32	March 10, 2006^{D}	FedExForum	No. 5 Memphis	57–46
33	January 16, 2007	FedExForum	No. 17 Memphis	79–54
34	February 8, 2007	Bartow Arena	No. 8 Memphis	70–56
35	February 16, 2008	Bartow Arena	No. 1 Memphis^{†}	79–78
36	March 8, 2008	FedExForum	No. 2 Memphis^{†}	94–56
37	January 17, 2009	FedExForum	Memphis	81–68
38	February 26, 2009	Bartow Arena	No. 5 Memphis	71–60
39	February 3, 2010	FedExForum	Memphis	85–75
40	March 3, 2010	Bartow Arena	Memphis	70–65
41	January 22, 2011	Bartow Arena	Memphis	76–73^{OT}
42	February 16, 2011	FedExForum	Memphis	62–58
43	January 7, 2012	Bartow Arena	Memphis	62–59
44	February 11, 2012	FedExForum	Memphis	79–45
45	January 12, 2013	Bartow Arena	Memphis	69–53
46	March 9, 2013	FedExForum	No. 25 Memphis	86–71
47	December 10, 2016	FedExForum	Memphis	62–55
48	November 30, 2017	Bartow Arena	UAB	71–56
49	December 8, 2018	FedExForum	Memphis	94–76
50	December 7, 2019	Bartow Arena	No. 15 Memphis	65–57
51	January 29, 2024	Bartow Arena	UAB	97–88
52	March 3, 2024	FedExForum	Memphis	106–87
53	January 26, 2025	FedExForm	No. 24 Memphis	100–77
54	March 2, 2025	Bartow Arena	No. 18 Memphis	88–81
55	March 16, 2025^{E}	Dickies Arena	No. 16 Memphis	84–72
56	February 5, 2026	Bartow Arena	Memphis	90–80
57	February 22, 2026	FedEx Forum	UAB	78–67
Series: Memphis leads 41–13
† Vacated by Memphis

==== Notes ====
^{A} NCAA second round
^{B} 1992 Great Midwest Conference men's basketball tournament
^{C} 1994 Great Midwest Conference men's basketball tournament
^{D} 2006 Conference USA men's basketball tournament
^{E} 2025 American Athletic Conference men's basketball tournament

== Football ==
Battle for the Bones
- Memphis Tigers UAB Blazers
- Sport: College football
- First meeting: September 6, 1997; Memphis 28, UAB 7
- Latest meeting: October 10, 2026; Memphis 38, UAB 13
- Next meeting: 2027; Birmingham, Alabama
- Trophy: The Bones

Statistics
- Total meetings: 19
- All-time series: UAB, 11–8
- Largest victory: Memphis, 46–9 (2012)
- Longest win streak: UAB, 7 (2000–2006)
- Current win streak: Memphis, 1 (2026–present)

The Blazers and Tigers began competing in football after the Blazers football team joined Division I in 1997. The series has been played nearly every year since and is currently led by UAB with a win–loss record of 11 to 8. In 2006, the schools introduced a trophy, a 100-pound (45 kg) bronze rack of ribs alluding to the two cities' reputation for barbecue, and dubbed the game the "Battle for the Bones". In keeping with the theme, a fan barbecue competition accompanies the game.

In 2025, unranked UAB upset #22 Memphis 31–24 after a last-second goal-line stand. The victory ended UAB's 3-game skid against the Tigers.

=== Game results ===
Rankings are from the AP Poll (1936–present)

UAB victories	Memphis victories

No.	Date	Location	Winner	Score
1	September 6, 1997	Memphis, TN	Memphis	28–7
2	October 9, 1999	Birmingham, AL	Memphis	38–14
3	October 14, 2000	Birmingham, AL	UAB	13–9
4	October 27, 2001	Memphis, TN	UAB	17–14
5	September 28, 2002	Birmingham, AL	UAB	31–17
6	October 4, 2003	Memphis, TN	UAB	24–10
7	September 25, 2004	Birmingham, AL	UAB	35–28
8	November 1, 2005	Memphis, TN	UAB	37–20
9	October 7, 2006	Birmingham, AL	UAB	35–29
10	November 17, 2007	Memphis, TN	Memphis	25–9
11	October 2, 2008	Birmingham, AL	Memphis	33–30
12	November 14, 2009	Memphis, TN	UAB	31–21
13	November 20, 2010	Birmingham, AL	UAB	31–15
14	November 12, 2011	Memphis, TN	UAB	41–35
15	November 17, 2012	Birmingham, AL	Memphis	46–9
16	October 21, 2023	Birmingham, AL	Memphis	45–21
17	November 16, 2024	Memphis, TN	Memphis	53–18
18	October 18, 2025	Birmingham, AL	UAB	31–24
19	October 10, 2026	Memphis, TN	Memphis	38–13
Series: UAB leads 11–8
