= Moussa Diabaté =

French basketball player (born 2002)

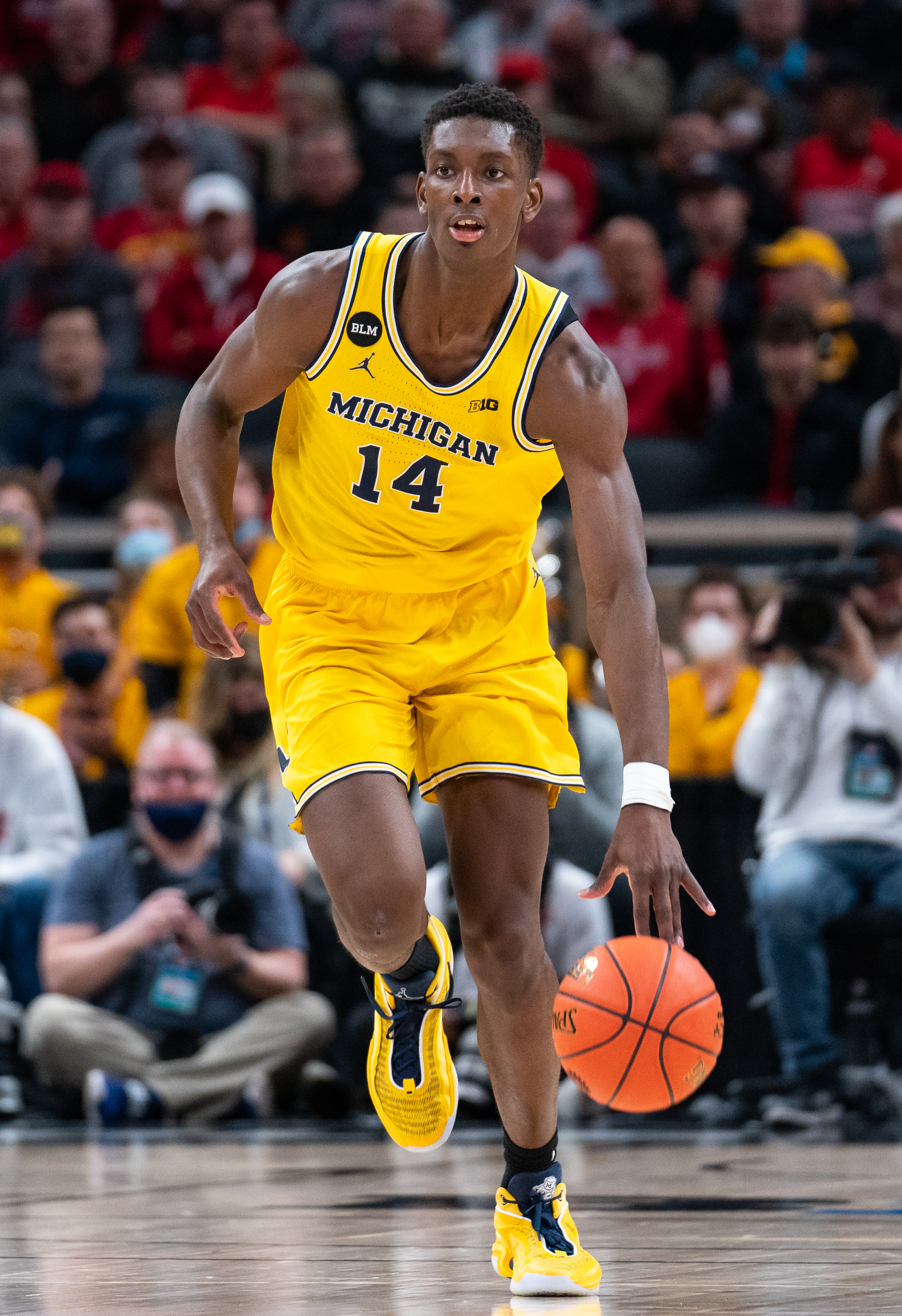
- Diabaté with Michigan in 2022

No. 14 – Charlotte Hornets
- Position: Power forward
- League: NBA

Personal information
- Born: 21 January 2002 (age 24) Paris, France
- Listed height: 6 ft 10 in (2.08 m)
- Listed weight: 210 lb (95 kg)

Career information
- High school: Florida Prep Academy (Melbourne, Florida); DME Academy (Daytona Beach, Florida); IMG Academy (Bradenton, Florida)
- College: Michigan (2021–2022)
- NBA draft: 2022: 2nd round, 43rd overall pick
- Drafted by: Los Angeles Clippers
- Playing career: 2022–present

Career history
- 2022–2024: Los Angeles Clippers
- 2022–2024: →Ontario Clippers
- 2024–present: Charlotte Hornets
- 2024–2025: →Greensboro Swarm

Career highlights
- All-NBA G League Third Team (2023); NBA G League All-Rookie Team (2023); Big Ten All-Freshman Team (2022); McDonald's All-American (2021)
- Stats at NBA.com
- Stats at Basketball Reference

Moussa Diabaté (/ˈmuːsə ˌdʒəˈbɑːteɪ/ MOO-sə JAH-BAH-tay,French pronunciation: [musa di.abate]; born 21 January 2002) is a French professional basketball player for the Charlotte Hornets of the National Basketball Association (NBA). He played college basketball for the Michigan Wolverines. Diabaté was a consensus five-star recruit and one of the top centers in the 2021 class.

== Early life and youth career ==
Born in Paris to Malian and Guinean parents, Diabaté started playing basketball at age 12 with Sporting Club Maccabi de Paris. After a few months, he moved to USD Charonne, where his interest in the sport formed, and he later competed for Saint Charles de Charenton Saint Maurice. Diabaté was not allowed into the sports institute CREPS for academic reasons. At age 14, he moved to the United States to advance his basketball career. In eighth grade, he joined the middle school program of Montverde Academy in Montverde, Florida. At first, he did not speak English and struggled to adjust to the American style of play.

== High school career ==
As a freshman in high school, Diabaté played for Florida Preparatory Academy in Melbourne, Florida. For his sophomore season, he transferred to DME Academy in Daytona Beach, Florida. Diabaté grabbed 30 rebounds in a game against Marshall County High School. As a sophomore, he averaged 17.9 points, 11.1 rebounds and 2.2 assists per game. After the season, Diabaté competed for Nightrydas Elite at the Nike Elite Youth Basketball League.

For his junior season, he moved to IMG Academy in Bradenton, Florida. In December 2019, Diabaté helped his team reach the City of Palms Classic final. He participated in the Basketball Without Borders Global Camp during NBA All-Star Weekend in February 2020. As a junior, Diabaté averaged 14.5 points and seven rebounds per game. In his senior season, he averaged 14.1 points and 7.5 rebounds per game, and led his team to a 21–3 record. He was selected to the McDonald's All-American Game and Jordan Brand Classic rosters.

=== Recruiting ===
Diabaté was a consensus five-star recruit and one of the top power forwards in the 2021 class. On 9 November 2020, he committed to playing college basketball for Michigan over offers from Arizona, Kentucky and Memphis, among others.

College recruiting
Name	Hometown	School	Height	Weight	Commit date
Moussa Diabaté; PF	Paris, France	IMG Academy (FL)	6 ft 10 in (2.08 m)	215 lb (98 kg)	Nov 9, 2020
Moussa Diabaté; PF	Recruit ratings: Rivals: 247Sports: ESPN: (94)				
Overall recruit ranking: Rivals: 25 247Sports: 15 ESPN: 13
Note: In many cases, Scout, Rivals, 247Sports, On3, and ESPN may conflict in their listings of height and weight.; In these cases, the average was taken. ESPN grades are on a 100-point scale.; Sources: "Michigan 2021 Basketball Commitments". Rivals.; "2021 Michigan Wolverines Recruiting Class". ESPN.; "2021 Team Ranking". Rivals.

== College career ==
On 20 February 2022, Diabaté was involved in the postgame melee following a 77–63 loss to Wisconsin and appeared to throw punches. He was suspended one game by the Big Ten Conference for his role in the brawl. Diabaté was named to the Big Ten All-Freshman Team. He averaged 9.0 points and 6.0 rebounds in his freshman season. On 25 April 2022, he declared for the 2022 NBA draft while maintaining his college eligibility. However, on 1 June 2022, Diabaté announced he would remain in the draft and forego his remaining eligibility.

== Professional career ==
=== Los Angeles Clippers (2022–2024) ===
Diabaté was selected with the 43rd overall pick by the Los Angeles Clippers in the 2022 NBA draft. Diabaté joined the Clippers' 2022 NBA Summer League roster. In his Summer League debut, Diabaté scored ten points and seven rebounds in a 94–76 win over the Memphis Grizzlies. On July 22, 2022, Diabaté signed a two-way contract with the Clippers.

On October 22, 2022, Diabaté dressed for the second game of the season for the 2022–23 Los Angeles Clippers but did not play. The second time he dressed, he played in the team's 5th game on October 27, for 1:47 accumulating an assist, steal, 2 rebounds, a field goal and a free throw against the Sacramento Kings. He posted his first professional double double on November 18, for the Ontario Clippers against the Salt Lake City Stars with 24 points (on 10 for 12 shooting from the field) and 10 rebounds. On December 14, he was named G League Player of the Week for a pair of 20-point/20-rebound efforts. On December 17, in his 8th NBA game, with Paul George, Ivica Zubac, Reggie Jackson and Norman Powell unable to play, he made his first start at home against the Washington Wizards. Following the season, he was named to the G League's All-Rookie team. He was also named to the postseason All-NBA G League Team third team.

On July 14, 2023, Diabaté signed another two-way contract with the Clippers.

=== Charlotte Hornets (2024–present) ===
On July 31, 2024, Diabaté signed a two-way contract with the Charlotte Hornets. On November 12, he posted his first NBA double double with 12 points and 15 rebounds against the Orlando Magic. In his next outing on November 16 he tallied 12 points and 14 rebounds against the Milwaukee Bucks for another double double. The game marked Diabate's fourth consecutive game with at least 11 rebounds. On November 21, he posted a then career-high 16 rebounds against Detroit. On February 9, 2025, Diabaté's contract was converted to a standard three-year NBA deal. The following night he posted a career high 21 points and 10 rebounds against the Brooklyn Nets.

On December 22, 2025, Diabaté posted a career-high six steals as well as 14 rebounds against Cleveland with Ryan Kalkbrenner sidelined and Mason Plumlee exiting the game in the first quarter. On December 23, with Kalkbrenner and Plumlee sidelined, Diabaté posted a career-high 18 rebounds (13 in the first half) as well as 12 points in a 126–109 win against the Washington Wizards. On January 28, Diabaté posted 18 points on 8–9 shooting (including a successful first three point shot attempt of the season), and a career-high 19 rebounds in a 112–97 victory over Memphis. At one point, he was credited with 21 rebounds, but the total was corrected, although some sources were published before the total was fully corrected and credit him with 20 rebounds. On February 9, he was ejected when he retaliated to an open handed hand to the face from Jalen Duren as part of a larger altercation that saw Duren, Miles Bridges, Charles Lee, and Isaiah Stewart ejected.

== National team career ==
Diabaté led France to fourth place at the 2018 FIBA U16 European Championship in Novi Sad, Serbia. He averaged 11.1 points and 10.3 rebounds per game, recording 16 points and 17 rebounds against Serbia in the quarterfinals. At the 2019 FIBA U18 European Championship in Volos, Greece, he averaged 13.1 points, 11.1 rebounds and 2.1 blocks per game for France, who came in fifth place. In a group stage win over Greece, Diabaté recorded 14 points and 20 rebounds.

== Career statistics ==
Legend
GP	Games played	GS	Games started	MPG	Minutes per game
FG%	Field goal percentage	3P%	3-point field goal percentage	FT%	Free throw percentage
RPG	Rebounds per game	APG	Assists per game	SPG	Steals per game
BPG	Blocks per game	PPG	Points per game	**Bold**	Career high

=== NBA ===
Year	Team	GP	GS	MPG	FG%	3P%	FT%	RPG	APG	SPG	BPG	PPG
2022–23	L.A. Clippers	22	1	8.9	.511	**.500**	.625	2.3	.2	.3	.4	2.7
2023–24	L.A. Clippers	11	0	5.8	.526	—	.643	2.2	.4	.5	.1	2.6
2024–25	Charlotte	71	8	17.5	.596	.000	.595	6.2	.8	.6	.6	5.7
2025–26	Charlotte	**73**	**47**	**26.0**	**.631**	**.500**	**.659**	**8.7**	**1.9**	**.8**	**1.0**	**7.9**
Career		177	56	19.2	.606	.200	.634	6.5	1.2	.6	.7	6.0

=== College ===
Year	Team	GP	GS	MPG	FG%	3P%	FT%	RPG	APG	SPG	BPG	PPG
2021–22	Michigan	32	26	24.9	.542	.214	.619	6.0	.8	.3	.9	9.0
