= 2005–06 UAB Blazers men's basketball team =

American college basketball season

2005–06 UAB Blazers men's basketball

NCAA tournament, First round
- Conference: Conference USA

Ranking
- AP: No. 25
- Record: 24–7 (12–2 C-USA)
- Head coach: Mike Anderson (4th season)
- Home arena: Bartow Arena

2005–06 Conference USA men's basketball standings
	Conf.				Overall
Team	W		L	PCT	W		L	PCT
No. 4 Memphis†	13	–	1	.929	33	–	4	.892
No. 25 UAB	12	–	2	.857	24	–	7	.774
UTEP	11	–	3	.786	21	–	10	.677
Houston	9	–	5	.643	21	–	10	.677
UCF	7	–	7	.500	14	–	15	.483
Rice	6	–	8	.429	12	–	16	.429
Tulane	6	–	8	.429	12	–	17	.414
Tulsa	6	–	8	.429	11	–	17	.393
Marshall	5	–	9	.357	12	–	16	.429
SMU	4	–	10	.286	13	–	16	.448
Southern Miss	3	–	11	.214	10	–	21	.323
East Carolina	2	–	12	.143	8	–	20	.286
† 2006 C-USA Tournament winner Rankings from AP Poll

The 2005–06 UAB Blazers men's basketball team represented the University of Alabama at Birmingham as a member of the Conference USA during the 2005–06 NCAA Division I men's basketball season. This was head coach Mike Anderson's fourth season at UAB, and the Blazers played their home games at Bartow Arena. They finished the season 24–7, 12–2 in C-USA play and lost in the semifinals of the C-USA tournament. They received an at-large bid to the NCAA tournament as No. 9 seed in the East region. The Blazers fell in the opening round to No. 8 seed Kentucky, 69–64.

== Roster ==
2005–06 UAB Blazers men's basketball team
Players
Coaches

Pos.	#	Name	Height	Weight	Year	Hometown
G	0	Carldell Johnson	5 ft 10 in (1.78 m)	175 lb (79 kg)	Sr	New Orleans, Louisiana
G	4	Paul Delaney III	6 ft 2 in (1.88 m)	185 lb (84 kg)	So	Decatur, Georgia
F	23	Demario Eddins	6 ft 7 in (2.01 m)	190 lb (86 kg)	Sr	Chicago, Illinois

Head coach

- Mike Anderson

Assistant coach(es)

Legend

- (C) Team captain
- (S) Suspended
- (I) Ineligible
- (W) Walk-on
- Injured
- Current redshirt

Roster

== Schedule and results ==
Date time, TV	Rank^{#}	Opponent^{#}	Result	Record	Site (attendance) city, state
Exhibition
Nov 10, 2005*; 7:30 p.m.		West Alabama	W 83–41		Bartow Arena; Birmingham, Alabama
Nov 11, 2005*; 7:30 p.m.		North Georgia	W 98–68		Bartow Arena; Birmingham, Alabama
Regular season
Nov 25, 2005*; 11:30 a.m., FoxSportsNet		vs. UMass; Hall of Fame Classic	W 86–77	1–0	MassMutual Center (6,105); Springfield, Massachusetts
Nov 27, 2005*; 3:00 p.m.		South Carolina State	W 79–48	2–0	Bartow Arena (3,487); Birmingham, Alabama
Nov 29, 2005*; 7:30 p.m.		Western Kentucky	L 76–92	2–1	Bartow Arena (3,835); Birmingham, Alabama
Dec 3, 2005*; 3:00 p.m.		at Nebraska	W 73–72	3–1	Bob Devaney Sports Center (9,942); Lincoln, Nebraska
Dec 6, 2005*; 7:30 p.m.		at DePaul	L 66–70	3–2	Rosemont Horizon (7,747); Rosemont, Illinois
Dec 10, 2005*; 7:30 p.m.		Alcorn State	W 81–59	4–2	Bartow Arena (3,676); Birmingham, Alabama
Dec 14, 2005*; 7:00 p.m.		at Minnesota	L 68–69	4–3	Williams Arena (11,034); Minneapolis, Minnesota
Dec 19, 2005*; 8:30 p.m.		Centenary	W 72–58	5–3	Bartow Arena (3,080); Birmingham, Alabama
Dec 22, 2005*; 7:30 p.m.		Old Dominion	W 85–57	6–3	Bartow Arena (4,588); Birmingham, Alabama
Dec 28, 2005*; 6:30 p.m.		Oklahoma State	W 90–71	7–3	Bartow Arena (8,289); Birmingham, Alabama
Dec 30, 2005*; 6:00 p.m.		at South Florida	W 59–47	8–3	Sun Dome (2,374); Tampa, Florida
Jan 2, 2006*; 7:30 p.m.		VCU	W 68–62	9–3	Bartow Arena (3,879); Birmingham, Alabama
Jan 5, 2006*; 7:30 p.m.		Valdosta State	W 98–69	10–3	Bartow Arena (3,976); Birmingham, Alabama
Jan 11, 2006; 7:30 p.m.		Tulsa	W 84–54	11–3 (1–0)	Bartow Arena (4,388); Birmingham, Alabama
Jan 14, 2006; 6:00 p.m.		at Marshall	W 76–64	12–3 (2–0)	Cam Henderson Center (4,561); Huntington, West Virginia
Jan 18, 2006; 7:05 p.m.		at Rice	W 75–68	13–3 (3–0)	Reliant Arena (1,647); Houston, Texas
Jan 21, 2006; 5:00 p.m.		Houston	W 82–79	14–3 (4–0)	Bartow Arena (8,255); Birmingham, Alabama
Jan 26, 2006; 7:00 p.m., CSTV		at No. 3 Memphis	L 66–73	14–4 (4–1)	FedExForum (15,529); Memphis, Tennessee
Jan 28, 2006; 7:30 p.m.		Southern Miss	W 87–73	15–4 (5–1)	Bartow Arena (8,108); Birmingham, Alabama
Feb 4, 2006; 2:00 p.m.		at UCF	W 75–68	16–4 (6–1)	UCF Arena (2,062); Orlando, Florida
Feb 8, 2006; 9:00 p.m.		at UTEP	L 37–65	16–5 (6–2)	Don Haskins Center (10,983); El Paso, Texas
Feb 11, 2006; 7:30 p.m.		East Carolina	W 72–64	17–5 (7–2)	Bartow Arena (6,365); Birmingham, Alabama
Feb 15, 2006; 7:30 p.m.		Tulane	W 87–82	18–5 (8–2)	Bartow Arena (4,391); Birmingham, Alabama
Feb 18, 2006; 2:00 p.m.		at Southern Miss	W 87–50	19–5 (9–2)	Reed Green Coliseum (3,236); Hattiesburg, Mississippi
Feb 25, 2006; 7:00 p.m.		at SMU	W 73–68	20–5 (10–2)	Moody Coliseum (4,118); Dallas, Texas
Mar 2, 2006; 8:30 p.m., ESPN2		No. 3 Memphis	W 80–74	21–5 (11–2)	Bartow Arena (8,500); Birmingham, Alabama
Mar 4, 2006; 7:30 p.m.		Marshall	W 82–61	22–5 (12–2)	Bartow Arena (7,149); Birmingham, Alabama
C-USA tournament
Mar 9, 2006; 12:00 a.m.	(2) No. 24	vs. (10) SMU; Quarterfinals	W 69–55	22–6	FedExForum (9,346); Memphis, Tennessee
Mar 10, 2006; 6:00 p.m.	(2) No. 24	vs. (3) UTEP; Semifinals	W 63–60	23–6	FedExForum (12,524); Memphis, Tennessee
Mar 11, 2006; 10:35 a.m., CBS	(2) No. 24	at (1) No. 5 Memphis; Championship Game	L 46–57	23–7	FedExForum (16,607); Memphis, Tennessee
NCAA tournament
Mar 17, 2006*; 8:45 p.m., CBS	(9 E)	vs. (8 E) Kentucky; First round	L 64–69	24–7	Wachovia Center (19,999); Philadelphia, Pennsylvania
*Non-conference game. ^{#}Rankings from AP poll. (#) Tournament seedings in parentheses. E=East. All times are in Central Time.
