= Lanier High School (Sugar Hill, Georgia) =

Public high school in Sugar Hill, Georgia, United States

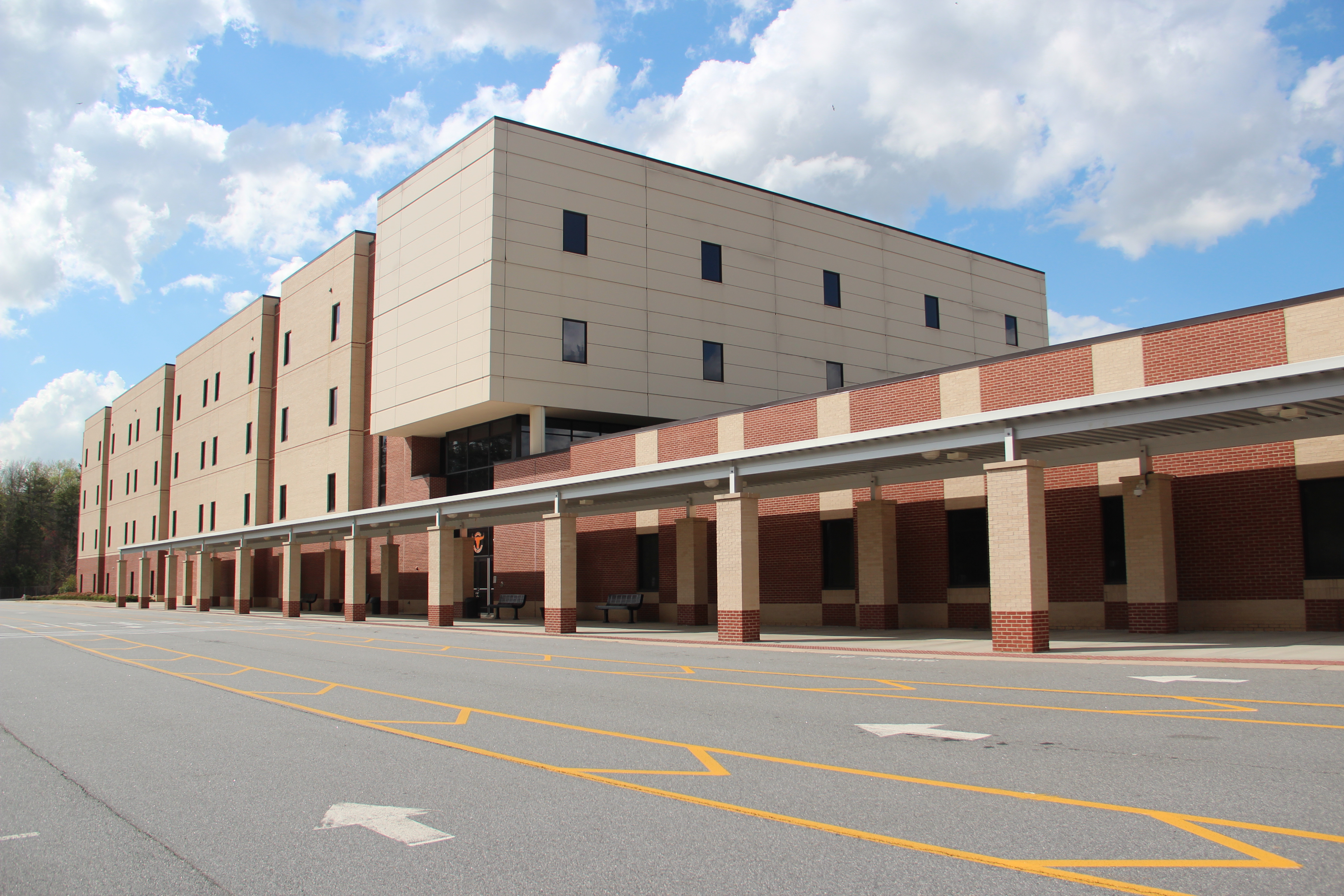
- Lanier High School

Location
- 918 Buford Highway; Sugar Hill, Gwinnett County, Georgia 30518; United States; 34.0860°N 84.0325°W

Information
- Type: Public
- Established: 2010
- School district: Gwinnett County Public Schools
- Principal: Christopher Martin
- Faculty: 115.80 (FTE)
- Grades: 9 to 12
- Enrollment: 1,861 (2023–2024)
- Student to teacher ratio: 16.07
- Colors: Orange, black and white
- Slogan: "Welcome to the ranch"
- Mascot: Longhorns
- Website: lanierhs.org

Lanier High School (LHS) is a public high school in Sugar Hill, Georgia, United States, and is a part of Gwinnett County Public Schools. It opened for classes on August 9, 2010.

The Lanier school district is made up of Sycamore Elementary School, White Oak Elementary School, Sugar Hill Elementary School, Lanier Middle School, and Lanier High School.

== History ==
In 1915, Sugar Hill High School was opened, later in 1958, North Gwinnett High School was established. The Sugar Hill School served grades one through seven. Then in 2010 Lanier High School was established as a split of the North Gwinnett High School cluster. This brought a high school back to Sugar Hill.

== Notable alumni ==
- Derrick Brown (2016), Pro Bowl defensive tackle for the Carolina Panthers
- Zach Calzada (2019), quarterback for the Kentucky Wildcats
- Sion James (2020), basketball player for the Charlotte Hornets
