= Sion James =

American basketball player (born 2002)

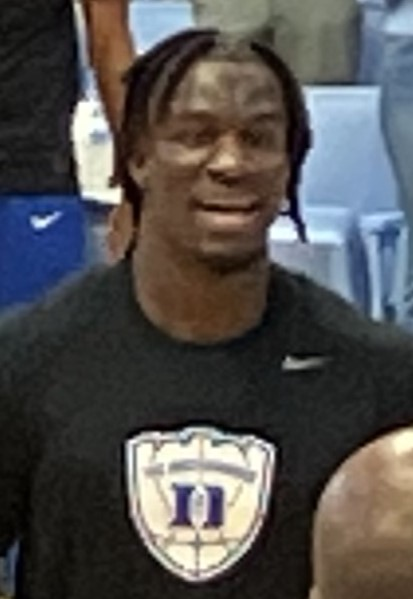
- James with Duke in 2025

No. 4 – Charlotte Hornets
- Position: Shooting guard
- League: NBA

Personal information
- Born: December 4, 2002 (age 23) Sugar Hill, Georgia, U.S.
- Listed height: 6 ft 5 in (1.96 m)
- Listed weight: 220 lb (100 kg)

Career information
- High school: Lanier (Sugar Hill, Georgia)
- College: Tulane (2020–2024); Duke (2024–2025)
- NBA draft: 2025: 2nd round, 33rd overall pick
- Drafted by: Charlotte Hornets
- Playing career: 2025–present

Career history
- 2025–present: Charlotte Hornets

Career highlights
- ACC All-Defensive team (2025)
- Stats at NBA.com
- Stats at Basketball Reference
Medals
Men's basketball
Representing United States
Summer Universiade
Bronze medal – third place	2021 China	Team

Sion James (born December 4, 2002) is an American professional basketball player for the Charlotte Hornets of the National Basketball Association (NBA). He played college basketball for the Tulane Green Wave and the Duke Blue Devils.

== Early life and high school career ==
James grew up in Sugar Hill, Georgia and attended Lanier High School. He averaged 14.6 points, 6.1 rebounds and 5.3 assists per game as a junior. James committed to playing college basketball for Tulane.

== College career ==
James began his college career at Tulane. He became a starter early into his freshman year. James averaged 5.8 points, 3.5 rebounds, 1.9 assists and 1.2 steals per game on the season. He averaged 9.7 points, 3.4 assists and 4.8 rebounds per game as a junior and also won the American Athletic Conference (AAC) sportsmanship award. He averaged 14 points, 5.4 rebounds, 2.7 assists and 1.6 steals per game during his senior season and again won the AAC sportsmanship award. After the season, James entered the NCAA transfer portal.

James transferred to Duke in May 2024. He averaged 8.6 points, 4.2 rebounds and 2.9 assists per game.

== Professional career ==
James was selected in the second round of the 2025 NBA draft with the 33rd pick by the Charlotte Hornets. James appeared in all 82 games (including 19 starts) for the Hornets during his rookie campaign, recording averages of 5.4 points, 3.5 rebounds, and 2.0 assists.

== Career statistics ==
Legend
GP	Games played	GS	Games started	MPG	Minutes per game
FG%	Field goal percentage	3P%	3-point field goal percentage	FT%	Free throw percentage
RPG	Rebounds per game	APG	Assists per game	SPG	Steals per game
BPG	Blocks per game	PPG	Points per game	**Bold**	Career high
*	Led the league

=== NBA ===
Year	Team	GP	GS	MPG	FG%	3P%	FT%	RPG	APG	SPG	BPG	PPG
2025–26	Charlotte	82*	19	22.5	.371	.352	.837	3.5	2.0	.6	.2	5.4
Career		82	19	22.5	.371	.352	.837	3.5	2.0	.6	.2	5.4

=== College ===
Year	Team	GP	GS	MPG	FG%	3P%	FT%	RPG	APG	SPG	BPG	PPG
2020–21	Tulane	23	17	26.0	.431	.280	.650	3.5	1.9	1.2	.2	5.8
2021–22	Tulane	29	28	35.2	.409	.333	.703	4.3	**3.6**	1.6	.5	7.4
2022–23	Tulane	31	31	**37.1**	.483	.317	.710	4.8	3.4	**2.0**	**.8**	9.7
2023–24	Tulane	31	31	36.7	.514	.381	.683	**5.4**	2.7	1.6	.7	**14.0**
2024–25	Duke	**39**	**32**	25.5	**.516**	**.413**	**.810**	4.2	2.9	.8	.3	8.6
Career		153	139	32.0	.481	.358	.715	4.5	3.0	1.4	.5	9.3
