= 2006 Patriot League men's basketball tournament =

- Classification: Division I
- Season: 2005–06
- Teams: 8
- Site: Hart Center (First and second rounds); Worcester, Massachusetts
- Finals site: Sojka Pavilion (All three rounds); Lewisburg, Pennsylvania
- Champions: Bucknell (2nd title)
- Winning coach: Pat Flannery (2nd title)
- MVP: Charles Lee (2) (Bucknell)

2005–06 Patriot League men's basketball standings
	Conf.				Overall
Team	W		L	PCT	W		L	PCT
Bucknell †	14	–	0	1.000	27	–	5	.844
Holy Cross	11	–	3	.786	20	–	12	.625
Lehigh	11	–	3	.786	19	–	12	.613
American	7	–	7	.500	12	–	17	.414
Lafayette	5	–	9	.357	11	–	17	.393
Colgate	4	–	10	.286	10	–	19	.345
Navy	3	–	11	.214	10	–	18	.357
Army	1	–	13	.071	5	–	22	.185
† 2006 Patriot League tournament winner

The 2006 Patriot League men's basketball tournament was played at Hart Center in Worcester, Massachusetts and Sojka Pavilion in Lewisburg, Pennsylvania after the conclusion of the 2005–06 regular season. Top seed Bucknell defeated second seed Holy Cross, 74–59 in the championship game, to win its second Patriot League Tournament title. The Bison earned an automatic bid to the 2006 NCAA tournament as #9 seed in the Oakland region. In the round of 64, Bucknell defeated #8 seed Arkansas 59–55.

== Format ==
All eight league members participated in the tournament, with teams seeded according to regular season conference record.

== Bracket ==
Quarterfinals; March 3
1	Bucknell	59
8	Army	47
4	American	75
5	Lafayette	62
3	Lehigh	48
6	Colgate	44
2	Holy Cross	78
7	Navy	50

Semifinals; March 5
1	Bucknell	64
5	American	50
3	Lehigh	66
2	Holy Cross	73

Championship game March 10
1	Bucknell	74
2	Holy Cross	59
