= Pat Flannery =

American former college basketball coach

Biographical details
- Born: September 23, 1957 (age 69); Pottsville, Pennsylvania, U.S.

Playing career
- 1976–1980: Bucknell
- Position: Point guard

Coaching career (HC unless noted)
- 1981–1983: Bucknell (assistant)
- 1983–1986: Drexel (assistant)
- 1986–1987: William & Mary (assistant)
- 1987–1989: Drexel (assistant)
- 1989–1994: Lebanon Valley
- 1994–2008: Bucknell

Head coaching record
- Overall: 327–222
- Tournaments: 2–2 (NCAA Division I); 6–1 (NCAA Division III)

Accomplishments and honors

Championships
- NCAA Division III (1994); 3 Patriot League regular reason (1995, 2006, 2007); 2 Patriot League tournament (2005, 2006)

Awards
- 3x Patriot League Coach of the Year (1995, 1997, 2006); Hugh Durham Award (2006)

Pat Flannery (born September 23, 1957) is an American former college basketball coach. He served as the head men's basketball at Lebanon Valley College from 1989 to 1994 and Bucknell University from 1994 to 2008. Flannery was born in Pottsville, Pennsylvania, and attended Pottsville Area High School, graduating in 1976. He played college basketball at Bucknell as a point guard, leading the Bison to several league championships before graduating in 1980. Flannery led his team, a 14-seed, to a first-round victory in the 2005 NCAA Division I tournament over Kansas. Bucknell's victory was the first NCAA Tournament win ever for any Patriot League team. In the 2006 regular season the Bison went undefeated in Patriot League play. In the 2006 NCAA tournament, the Bison beat Arkansas in the first round for their second consecutive first-round victory. Following the 2007–08 basketball season, Flannery retired after 14 seasons as Bucknell's head coach. He resides in Lewisburg, Pennsylvania, and now works in a fundraising capacity for Bucknell.

== Head coaching record ==
Record table
Season	Team	Overall	Conference	Standing	Postseason
Lebanon Valley Flying Dutchmen (Middle Atlantic Conference) (1989–1994)
1989–90	Lebanon Valley	17–9			
1990–91	Lebanon Valley	14–11			
1991–92	Lebanon Valley	17–8			
1992–93	Lebanon Valley	18–11			NCAA Division III second round
1993–94	Lebanon Valley	28–4			NCAA Division III champion
Lebanon Valley:		94–43			
Bucknell Bison (Patriot League) (1994–2008)
1994–95	Bucknell	13–14	11–3	T–1st	
1995–96	Bucknell	17–11	8–4	T–3rd	
1996–97	Bucknell	18–11	9–3	2nd	
1997–98	Bucknell	13–15	8–4	3rd	
1998–99	Bucknell	16–13	9–3	T–2nd	
1999–00	Bucknell	17–11	8–4	3rd	
2000–01	Bucknell	14–15	4–8	T–5th	
2001–02	Bucknell	13–16	8–6	T–3rd	
2002–03	Bucknell	14–15	7–7	5th	
2003–04	Bucknell	14–15	9–5	T–3rd	
2004–05	Bucknell	23–10	11–3	2nd	NCAA Division I second round
2005–06	Bucknell	27–5	14–0	1st	NCAA Division I second round
2006–07	Bucknell	22–9	13–1	T–1st	
2007–08	Bucknell	12–19	6–8	T–5th	
Bucknell:		233–179			
Total:		327–222			
National champion Postseason invitational champion Conference regular season champion Conference regular season and conference tournament champion Division regular season champion Division regular season and conference tournament champion Conference tournament champion
