= 2005 Patriot League men's basketball tournament =

- Classification: Division I
- Season: 2004–05
- Teams: 8
- Site: Sojka Pavilion (First and second rounds); Lewisburg, Pennsylvania
- Finals site: Hart Center (All three rounds); Worcester, Massachusetts
- Champions: Bucknell (1st title)
- Winning coach: Pat Flannery (1st title)
- MVP: Charles Lee (Bucknell)

2004–05 Patriot League men's basketball standings
| | Conf. | | | | Overall |
| Team | W | | L | PCT | W | | L | PCT |
|---|---|---|---|---|---|---|---|---|
| Holy Cross | 13 | – | 1 | .929 | 25 | – | 7 | .781 |
| Bucknell † | 10 | – | 4 | .714 | 23 | – | 10 | .697 |
| American | 8 | – | 6 | .571 | 16 | – | 12 | .571 |
| Lehigh | 7 | – | 7 | .500 | 14 | – | 15 | .483 |
| Colgate | 7 | – | 7 | .500 | 12 | – | 16 | .429 |
| Navy | 5 | – | 9 | .357 | 9 | – | 19 | .321 |
| Lafayette | 5 | – | 9 | .357 | 9 | – | 19 | .321 |
| Army | 1 | – | 13 | .071 | 3 | – | 24 | .111 |
† 2005 Patriot League tournament winner

The 2005 Patriot League men's basketball tournament was played at Sojka Pavilion in Lewisburg, Pennsylvania and Hart Center in Worcester, Massachusetts after the conclusion of the 2004–05 regular season. Number two seed Bucknell defeated top seed Holy Cross, 61–57 in the championship game, to win its first Patriot League Tournament title. The Bison earned an automatic bid to the 2005 NCAA tournament as #14 seed in the Syracuse region. In the round of 64, Bucknell upset #3 seed Kansas 64–63. It was the first win for a Patriot League team in the NCAA Tournament, and the first time Kansas lost an opening-round game since 1978.

== Format ==
All eight league members participated in the tournament, with teams seeded according to regular season conference record.

== Bracket ==
Quarterfinals; March 4
1 | Holy Cross | 76
8 | Army | 42
4 | Lehigh | 77
5 | Colgate | 60
3 | American | 85*
6 | Navy | 83
2 | Bucknell | 70
7 | Lafayette | 34

Semifinals; March 6
1 | Holy Cross | 57*
5 | Lehigh | 53
3 | American | 35
2 | Bucknell | 53

Championship game March 11
1 | Holy Cross | 57
2 | Bucknell | 61

* denotes overtime period
