= 2025–26 Charlotte Hornets season =

2025–26 NBA season by team

- Head coach: Charles Lee
- President: Fred Whitfield
- General manager: Jeff Peterson
- Owner(s): Gabe Plotkin; Rick Schnall
- Arena: Spectrum Center

Results
- Record: 44–38 (.537)
- Place: Division: 3rd (Southeast); Conference: 9th (Eastern)
- Playoff finish: Did not qualify
- Stats at Basketball Reference

Local media
- Television: Bally Sports South · Bally Sports Southeast; Cox Media Group/Gray Media (Note: Affiliates include: WSOC-TV or WAXN-TV (Charlotte); WIS-DT4/WPAM-LD (Columbia); WCSC-DT3 (Charleston); WITN-DT2 (Greenville-New Bern); WHNS-DT2 (Greenville-Spartanburg-Asheville-Anderson); WMBF-DT3 (Myrtle Beach); WRAL-DT3 (Raleigh); WECT-DT3 (Wilmington)) (12 simulcasts)
- Radio: WFNZ

The 2025–26 Charlotte Hornets season was the 36th season for the franchise in the National Basketball Association (NBA).

Despite starting the season 4–14 record through late November 2025, the Hornets made a mid-season turnaround. Between January and February 2026, the team recorded a nine-game winning streak, their longest in their current incarnation. During the winning streak, on January 28, 2026, the Hornets improved on their 19–63 record from their previous season with a win over the Memphis Grizzlies. On March 19, 2026, the Hornets retired Dell Curry's jersey number 30 during their game against the Orlando Magic.

The Hornets also clinched their first winning season since 2021–22 with a win over the Indiana Pacers on April 3. On April 10, they clinched a play-in spot for the first time since 2022. They finished the regular season with a 44–38 record, placing ninth in the East. During the first stage of the tournament, they defeated the Miami Heat in overtime. However, they were eliminated from playoff contention for the 10th consecutive season after a blowout loss to the Orlando Magic in the second round of the play-in tournament.

This would turn out to be the final season for LaMelo Ball and Miles Bridges with the Hornets, as they would be traded to the Minnesota Timberwolves and the Phoenix Suns, respectively, in the following off-season.

== Draft ==
Round	Pick	Player	Position(s)	Nationality	College
1	4	Kon Knueppel	Small Forward	United States	Duke
2	33	Sion James	Small Forward	United States	Duke
2	34	Ryan Kalkbrenner	Center	United States	Creighton

The Hornets entered the draft with one first-round pick and two second-round picks, one of which originally belonged to the New Orleans Pelicans. That additional pick landed 34th overall and was acquired via trade with the San Antonio Spurs.

== Roster ==
2025–26 Charlotte Hornets roster
Players

Pos.	No.	Player	Height	Weight	DOB	From
G	1	LaMelo Ball	6 ft 7 in (2.01 m)	180 lb (82 kg)	2001-08-22	SPIRE Academy (OH)
F	0	Miles Bridges	6 ft 7 in (2.01 m)	225 lb (102 kg)	1998-03-21	Michigan State
G	21	Pat Connaughton	6 ft 5 in (1.96 m)	209 lb (95 kg)	1993-01-06	Notre Dame
F/C	14	Moussa Diabaté	6 ft 10 in (2.08 m)	210 lb (95 kg)	2002-01-21	Michigan
F	20	Tosan Evbuomwan (TW)	6 ft 8 in (2.03 m)	215 lb (98 kg)	2001-02-16	Princeton
G	10	Josh Green	6 ft 6 in (1.98 m)	200 lb (91 kg)	2000-11-16	Arizona
C	16	PJ Hall (TW)	6 ft 8 in (2.03 m)	245 lb (111 kg)	2002-02-21	Clemson
G	4	Sion James	6 ft 5 in (1.96 m)	220 lb (100 kg)	2002-12-04	Duke
C	11	Ryan Kalkbrenner	7 ft 1 in (2.16 m)	256 lb (116 kg)	2002-01-17	Creighton
G/F	7	Kon Knueppel	6 ft 6 in (1.98 m)	215 lb (98 kg)	2005-08-03	Duke
G	23	Tre Mann	6 ft 4 in (1.93 m)	178 lb (81 kg)	2001-02-03	Florida
F	33	Liam McNeeley	6 ft 7 in (2.01 m)	210 lb (95 kg)	2005-10-10	Connecticut
G/F	24	Brandon Miller	6 ft 7 in (2.01 m)	200 lb (91 kg)	2002-11-22	Alabama
G	12	Antonio Reeves (TW)	6 ft 5 in (1.96 m)	205 lb (93 kg)	2000-11-20	Kentucky
F	31	Tidjane Salaün	6 ft 10 in (2.08 m)	207 lb (94 kg)	2005-08-10	France
F/C	26	Xavier Tillman	6 ft 8 in (2.03 m)	245 lb (111 kg)	1999-01-12	Michigan State
G	3	Coby White	6 ft 4 in (1.93 m)	195 lb (88 kg)	2000-2-16	North Carolina
F	2	Grant Williams	6 ft 7 in (2.01 m)	236 lb (107 kg)	1998-11-30	Tennessee

Coaches
Head coach
- Charles Lee
Assistant(s)
- Jermaine Bucknor
- Ryan Frazier
- Matt Hill
- Josh Longstaff
- Blaine Mueller
- Kyle Neptune
- Zach Peterson
- Lamar Skeeter

Legend
- (DP) Unsigned draft pick
- (FA) Free agent
- (S) Suspended
- (GL) On assignment to G League affiliate
- (TW) Two-way affiliate player
- Injured

Roster
Updated: February 9, 2026

== Standings ==
=== Division ===
Southeast Division	W	L	PCT	GB	Home	Road	Div	GP
y – Atlanta Hawks	46	36	.561	–	24‍–‍17	22‍–‍19	9‍–‍7	82
x – Orlando Magic	45	37	.549	1.0	26‍–‍16	19‍–‍21	9‍–‍8	82
pi – Charlotte Hornets	44	38	.537	2.0	21‍–‍20	23‍–‍18	11‍–‍5	82
pi – Miami Heat	43	39	.524	3.0	26‍–‍15	17‍–‍24	10‍–‍7	82
Washington Wizards	17	65	.207	29.0	11‍–‍30	6‍–‍35	2‍–‍14	82

=== Conference ===
Eastern Conference
#	Team	W	L	PCT	GB	GP
1	c – Detroit Pistons *	60	22	.732	–	82
2	y – Boston Celtics *	56	26	.683	4.0	82
3	x – New York Knicks	53	29	.646	7.0	82
4	x – Cleveland Cavaliers	52	30	.634	8.0	82
5	x – Toronto Raptors	46	36	.561	14.0	82
6	y – Atlanta Hawks *	46	36	.561	14.0	82
7	x – Philadelphia 76ers	45	37	.549	15.0	82
8	x – Orlando Magic	45	37	.549	15.0	82
9	pi – Charlotte Hornets	44	38	.537	16.0	82
10	pi – Miami Heat	43	39	.524	17.0	82
11	Milwaukee Bucks	32	50	.390	28.0	82
12	Chicago Bulls	31	51	.378	29.0	82
13	Brooklyn Nets	20	62	.244	40.0	82
14	Indiana Pacers	19	63	.232	41.0	82
15	Washington Wizards	17	65	.207	43.0	82

== Game log ==
=== Preseason ===
Due to renovations at Spectrum Center, the Hornets did not play home preseason games at the arena.

2025 preseason game log
Total: 2–3 (Home: 1–1; Road: 1–2)
Preseason: 2–3 (home: 1–1; road: 1–2)

Game	Date	Team	Score	High points	High rebounds	High assists	Location Attendance	Record
1	October 5	Oklahoma City	L 114–135	Kon Knueppel (18)	Miles Bridges (8)	Tre Mann (5)	North Charleston Coliseum; 11,371	0–1
2	October 9	@ Oklahoma City	L 116–122	Tre Mann (18)	Tidjane Salaün (10)	LaMelo Ball (4)	Paycom Center; 0	0–2
3	October 11	@ Dallas	W 120–116	Ball, Bridges (20)	Miles Bridges (11)	LaMelo Ball (6)	American Airlines Center; 1,841	1–2
4	October 15	Memphis	W 145–116	Miles Bridges (29)	Moussa Diabaté (13)	LaMelo Ball (8)	First Horizon Coliseum; 12,559	2–2
5	October 17	@ New York	L 108–113	Collin Sexton (21)	Tidjane Salaün (10)	Collin Sexton (10)	Madison Square Garden; 19,270	2–3

2025–26 preseason schedule

=== Regular season ===
2025–26 game log
Total: 44–38 (Home: 21–20; Road: 23–18)
October: 2–3 (home: 1–1; road: 1–2)

Game	Date	Team	Score	High points	High rebounds	High assists	Location Attendance	Record
1	October 22	Brooklyn	W 136–117	Brandon Miller (25)	Bridges, Kalkbrenner (11)	LaMelo Ball (8)	Spectrum Center; 19,516	1–0
2	October 25	@ Philadelphia	L 121–125	LaMelo Ball (27)	Miles Bridges (10)	LaMelo Ball (8)	Xfinity Mobile Arena; 19,124	1–1
3	October 26	@ Washington	W 139–113	LaMelo Ball (38)	LaMelo Ball (13)	LaMelo Ball (13)	Capital One Arena; 16,307	2–1
4	October 28	@ Miami	L 117–144	LaMelo Ball (20)	LaMelo Ball (8)	LaMelo Ball (9)	Kaseya Center; 19,600	2–2
5	October 30	Orlando	L 107–123	Collin Sexton (19)	Ball, Kalkbrenner (7)	LaMelo Ball (13)	Spectrum Center; 18,478	2–3

November: 4–11 (home: 4–5; road: 0–6)

Game	Date	Team	Score	High points	High rebounds	High assists	Location Attendance	Record
6	November 1	Minnesota	L 105–122	Miles Bridges (30)	Moussa Diabaté (9)	LaMelo Ball (8)	Spectrum Center; 19,444	2–4
7	November 2	Utah	W 126–103	Miles Bridges (29)	Moussa Diabaté (12)	Collin Sexton (12)	Spectrum Center; 17,123	3–4
8	November 4	@ New Orleans	L 112–116	Miles Bridges (22)	Kon Knueppel (12)	Collin Sexton (5)	Smoothie King Center; 15,555	3–5
9	November 7	@ Miami	L 108–126	Kon Knueppel (30)	Miles Bridges (12)	Bridges, Mann (7)	Kaseya Center; 19,600	3–6
10	November 10	L.A. Lakers	L 111–121	Miles Bridges (34)	Kon Knueppel (10)	Kon Knueppel (9)	Spectrum Center; 19,537	3–7
11	November 12	Milwaukee	W 111–100	Miles Bridges (20)	Moussa Diabaté (13)	Collin Sexton (8)	Spectrum Center; 17,142	4–7
12	November 14	@ Milwaukee	L 134–147 (OT)	Miles Bridges (32)	Moussa Diabaté (11)	LaMelo Ball (10)	Fiserv Forum; 17,341	4–8
13	November 15	Oklahoma City	L 96–109	Miles Bridges (15)	Moussa Diabaté (11)	KJ Simpson (5)	Spectrum Center; 19,469	4–9
14	November 17	@ Toronto	L 108–110	Kon Knueppel (24)	Ryan Kalkbrenner (10)	LaMelo Ball (8)	Scotiabank Arena; 19,037	4–10
15	November 19	@ Indiana	L 118–127	Kon Knueppel (28)	Moussa Diabaté (12)	LaMelo Ball (9)	Gainbridge Fieldhouse; 17,003	4–11
16	November 22	L.A. Clippers	L 116–131	Kon Knueppel (26)	Moussa Diabaté (7)	LaMelo Ball (7)	Spectrum Center; 18,721	4–12
17	November 23	@ Atlanta	L 110–113	Kon Knueppel (28)	Moussa Diabaté (11)	Mason Plumlee (6)	State Farm Arena; 17,460	4–13
18	November 26	New York	L 101–129	Brandon Miller (18)	Ball, Kalkbrenner (6)	LaMelo Ball (4)	Spectrum Center; 19,588	4–14
19	November 28	Chicago	W 123–116	Brandon Miller (27)	Bridges, Diabaté (8)	LaMelo Ball (8)	Spectrum Center; 19,453	5–14
20	November 29	Toronto	W 118–111 (OT)	Miles Bridges (35)	Moussa Diabaté (9)	Ball, Sexton (5)	Spectrum Center; 17,060	6–14

December: 5–8 (home: 2–4; road: 3–4)

Game	Date	Team	Score	High points	High rebounds	High assists	Location Attendance	Record
21	December 1	@ Brooklyn	L 103–116	Kon Knueppel (18)	Tied (6)	LaMelo Ball (14)	Barclays Center; 16,443	6–15
22	December 3	@ New York	L 104–119	LaMelo Ball (34)	Ryan Kalkbrenner (9)	LaMelo Ball (9)	Madison Square Garden; 19,812	6–16
23	December 5	@ Toronto	W 111–86	Knueppel, Salaün (21)	Miles Bridges (9)	Kon Knueppel (7)	Scotiabank Arena; 19,800	7–16
24	December 7	Denver	L 106–115	Miles Bridges (24)	Miles Bridges (9)	Miles Bridges (8)	Spectrum Center; 18,416	7–17
25	December 12	Chicago	L 126–129	Kon Knueppel (33)	Ryan Kalkbrenner (6)	Kon Knueppel (9)	Spectrum Center; 16,205	7–18
26	December 14	@ Cleveland	W 119–111 (OT)	Kon Knueppel (29)	Brandon Miller (13)	Bridges, Miller (6)	Rocket Arena; 19,432	8–18
27	December 18	Atlanta	W 133–126	Ball, Knueppel (28)	Moussa Diabaté (6)	LaMelo Ball (13)	Spectrum Center; 16,124	9–18
28	December 20	@ Detroit	L 86–112	Bridges, Knueppel (19)	Kalkbrenner, Knueppel (7)	LaMelo Ball (6)	Little Caesars Arena; 20,062	9–19
29	December 22	@ Cleveland	L 132–139	LaMelo Ball (23)	Moussa Diabaté (14)	LaMelo Ball (9)	Rocket Arena; 19,432	9–20
30	December 23	Washington	W 126–109	LaMelo Ball (23)	Moussa Diabaté (18)	Ball, Bridges (9)	Spectrum Center; 18,679	10–20
31	December 26	@ Orlando	W 120–105	LaMelo Ball (22)	Moussa Diabaté (13)	Ball, Bridges (5)	Kia Center; 19,397	11–20
32	December 29	Milwaukee	L 113–123	Brandon Miller (31)	Tidjane Salaün (11)	Collin Sexton (8)	Spectrum Center; 19,562	11–21
33	December 31	Golden State	L 125–132	Brandon Miller (33)	Moussa Diabaté (8)	Knueppel, Sexton (8)	Spectrum Center; 19,685	11–22

January: 11–6 (home: 3–3; road: 8–3)

Game	Date	Team	Score	High points	High rebounds	High assists	Location Attendance	Record
34	January 2	@ Milwaukee	L 121–122	Kon Knueppel (26)	PJ Hall (8)	LaMelo Ball (7)	Fiserv Forum; 17,673	11–23
35	January 3	@ Chicago	W 112–99	Miles Bridges (26)	Miles Bridges (14)	LaMelo Ball (7)	United Center; 21,315	12–23
36	January 5	@ Oklahoma City	W 124–97	Brandon Miller (28)	Moussa Diabaté (12)	Diabaté, Knueppel (5)	Paycom Center; 18,203	13–23
37	January 7	Toronto	L 96–97	Collin Sexton (22)	Moussa Diabaté (11)	LaMelo Ball (7)	Spectrum Center; 17,337	13–24
38	January 8	Indiana	L 112–114	LaMelo Ball (33)	Kon Knueppel (8)	LaMelo Ball (8)	Spectrum Center; 17,342	13–25
39	January 10	@ Utah	W 150–95	Tre Mann (20)	Moussa Diabaté (10)	Kon Knueppel (6)	Delta Center; 18,186	14–25
40	January 12	@ L.A. Clippers	L 109–117	LaMelo Ball (25)	Moussa Diabaté (15)	Ball, Miller (5)	Intuit Dome; 17,927	14–26
41	January 15	@ L.A. Lakers	W 135–117	LaMelo Ball (30)	Bridges, James (8)	LaMelo Ball (11)	Crypto.com Arena; 18,997	15–26
42	January 17	@ Golden State	L 116–136	Brandon Miller (28)	Kon Knueppel (11)	Brandon Miller (5)	Chase Center; 18,064	15–27
43	January 18	@ Denver	W 110–87	Brandon Miller (23)	Tidjane Salaün (11)	LaMelo Ball (6)	Ball Arena; 19,971	16–27
44	January 21	Cleveland	L 87–94	Brandon Miller (24)	Kon Knueppel (11)	LaMelo Ball (7)	Spectrum Center; 17,619	16–28
45	January 22	@ Orlando	W 124–97	Brandon Miller (20)	Kon Knueppel (10)	LaMelo Ball (7)	Kia Center; 19,423	17–28
46	January 24	Washington	W 119–115	Brandon Miller (21)	Moussa Diabaté (14)	LaMelo Ball (11)	Spectrum Center; 15,698	18–28
47	January 26	Philadelphia	W 130–93	Brandon Miller (30)	Ryan Kalkbrenner (9)	LaMelo Ball (8)	Spectrum Center; 16,361	19–28
48	January 28	@ Memphis	W 112–97	Brandon Miller (26)	Moussa Diabaté (19)	Kon Knueppel (6)	FedExForum; 13,301	20–28
49	January 29	@ Dallas	W 123–121	Kon Knueppel (34)	Bridges, James (8)	LaMelo Ball (9)	American Airlines Center; 19,024	21–28
50	January 31	San Antonio	W 111–106	Brandon Miller (26)	Moussa Diabaté (10)	LaMelo Ball (8)	Spectrum Center; 19,533	22–28

February: 8–3 (home: 3–3; road: 5–0)

Game	Date	Team	Score	High points	High rebounds	High assists	Location Attendance	Record
51	February 2	New Orleans	W 102–95	LaMelo Ball (24)	Tied (9)	LaMelo Ball (5)	Spectrum Center; 17,263	23–28
52	February 5	@ Houston	W 109–99	Kon Knueppel (24)	Moussa Diabaté (12)	Tied (4)	Toyota Center; 18,055	24–28
53	February 7	@ Atlanta	W 126–119	Miles Bridges (26)	Moussa Diabaté (15)	LaMelo Ball (9)	State Farm Arena; 17,492	25–28
54	February 9	Detroit	L 104–110	Brandon Miller (24)	Moussa Diabaté (6)	Grant Williams (5)	Spectrum Center; 19,476	25–29
55	February 11	Atlanta	W 110–107	Brandon Miller (31)	PJ Hall (10)	LaMelo Ball (6)	Spectrum Center; 18,710	26–29
All-Star Game
56	February 19	Houston	L 101–105	Grant Williams (20)	Grant Williams (9)	Ball, Miller (7)	Spectrum Center; 19,622	26–30
57	February 20	Cleveland	L 113–118	Kon Knueppel (33)	Ryan Kalkbrenner (13)	Sion James (7)	Spectrum Center; 19,691	26–31
58	February 22	@ Washington	W 129–112	LaMelo Ball (37)	Ryan Kalkbrenner (9)	LaMelo Ball (7)	Capital One Arena; 16,443	27–31
59	February 24	@ Chicago	W 131–99	Brandon Miller (23)	Bridges, Diabaté (7)	LaMelo Ball (7)	United Center; 19,145	28–31
60	February 26	@ Indiana	W 133–109	Brandon Miller (33)	Moussa Diabaté (11)	LaMelo Ball (8)	Gainbridge Fieldhouse; 17,073	29–31
61	February 28	Portland	W 109–93	Brandon Miller (26)	Moussa Diabaté (11)	LaMelo Ball (8)	Spectrum Center; 19,634	30–31

March: 10–5 (home: 6–3; road: 4–2)

Game	Date	Team	Score	High points	High rebounds	High assists	Location Attendance	Record
62	March 3	Dallas	W 117–90	Brandon Miller (17)	Diabaté, James (8)	LaMelo Ball (9)	Spectrum Center; 19,519	31–31
63	March 4	@ Boston	W 118–89	Kon Knueppel (20)	Moussa Diabaté (9)	Diabaté, White (6)	TD Garden; 19,156	32–31
64	March 6	Miami	L 120–128	Kon Knueppel (27)	Moussa Diabaté (14)	Ball, Miller (5)	Spectrum Center; 19,653	32–32
65	March 8	@ Phoenix	L 99–111	LaMelo Ball (22)	Brandon Miller (9)	LaMelo Ball (6)	Mortgage Matchup Center; 17,071	32–33
66	March 10	@ Portland	W 103–101	Brandon Miller (23)	Diabaté, Miller (9)	Tied (4)	Moda Center; 18,133	33–33
67	March 11	@ Sacramento	W 117–109	LaMelo Ball (30)	Moussa Diabaté (10)	Tied (5)	Golden 1 Center; 15,597	34–33
68	March 14	@ San Antonio	L 102–115	Miles Bridges (22)	Knueppel, Miller (6)	Tied (3)	Frost Bank Center; 18,861	34–34
69	March 17	Miami	W 136–106	LaMelo Ball (30)	Moussa Diabaté (13)	LaMelo Ball (13)	Spectrum Center; 19,478	35–34
70	March 19	Orlando	W 130–111	Coby White (27)	Ball, Knueppel (6)	Brandon Miller (8)	Spectrum Center; 19,565	36–34
71	March 21	Memphis	W 124–101	LaMelo Ball (29)	Moussa Diabaté (14)	Coby White (7)	Spectrum Center; 19,487	37–34
72	March 24	Sacramento	W 134–90	Coby White (27)	Moussa Diabaté (11)	LaMelo Ball (8)	Spectrum Center; 19,450	38–34
73	March 26	New York	W 114–103	Kon Knueppel (26)	Kon Knueppel (11)	Kon Knueppel (8)	Spectrum Center; 19,625	39–34
74	March 28	Philadelphia	L 114–118	Brandon Miller (29)	Diabaté, Knueppel (11)	LaMelo Ball (8)	Spectrum Center; 19,616	39–35
75	March 29	Boston	L 99–114	LaMelo Ball (19)	Tied (6)	James, Miller (4)	Spectrum Center; 19,642	39–36
76	March 31	@ Brooklyn	W 117–86	Brandon Miller (25)	Moussa Diabaté (12)	LaMelo Ball (9)	Barclays Center; 18,027	40–36

April: 4–2 (home: 2–1; road: 2–1)

Game	Date	Team	Score	High points	High rebounds	High assists	Location Attendance	Record
77	April 2	Phoenix	W 127–107	Miles Bridges (25)	Moussa Diabaté (10)	LaMelo Ball (11)	Spectrum Center; 19,594	41–36
78	April 3	Indiana	W 129–108	Brandon Miller (22)	Ryan Kalkbrenner (8)	LaMelo Ball (9)	Spectrum Center; 19,579	42–36
79	April 5	@ Minnesota	W 122–108	LaMelo Ball (35)	Moussa Diabaté (9)	LaMelo Ball (8)	Target Center; 18,978	43–36
80	April 7	@ Boston	L 102–113	LaMelo Ball (36)	Miles Bridges (12)	LaMelo Ball (6)	TD Garden; 19,156	43–37
81	April 10	Detroit	L 100–118	LaMelo Ball (27)	Miles Bridges (8)	LaMelo Ball (8)	Spectrum Center; 19,623	43–38
82	April 12	@ New York	W 110–96	Tied (19)	Moussa Diabaté (9)	LaMelo Ball (6)	Madison Square Garden; 19,812	44–38

2025–26 season schedule

=== Play-in ===
2026 play-in game log
Total: 1–1 (Home: 1–0; Road: 0–1)
Play-in: 1–1 (home: 1–0; road: 0–1)

Game	Date	Team	Score	High points	High rebounds	High assists	Location Attendance	Record
1	April 14	Miami	W 127–126 (OT)	LaMelo Ball (30)	Moussa Diabaté (14)	LaMelo Ball (10)	Spectrum Center; 19,698	1–0
2	April 17	@ Orlando	L 90–121	LaMelo Ball (23)	Moussa Diabaté (8)	LaMelo Ball (5)	Kia Center; 19,005	1–1

2025–26 season schedule

=== NBA Cup ===
==== East Group C ====
Pos	Team	Pld	W	L	PF	PA	PD	Qualification
1	New York Knicks	4	3	1	512	477	+35	Advanced to knockout rounds
2	Miami Heat	4	3	1	507	458	+49	Advanced to knockout rounds
3	Milwaukee Bucks	4	2	2	467	463	+4	
4	Charlotte Hornets	4	1	3	461	500	−39	
5	Chicago Bulls	4	1	3	468	517	−49	

Source: NBA

== Player statistics ==
=== Regular season ===
Player	POS	GP	GS	MP	REB	AST	STL	BLK	PTS	MPG	RPG	APG	SPG	BPG	PPG
Sion James	SG	82	19	1,843	287	163	52	20	441	22.5	3.5	2.0	.6	.2	5.4
Kon Knueppel	SF	81	80	2,551	432	274	57	19	1,498	31.5	5.3	3.4	.7	.2	18.5
Miles Bridges	PF	77	77	2,387	450	246	46	34	1,314	31.0	5.8	3.2	.6	.4	17.1
Moussa Diabaté	C	73	47	1,899	635	141	56	72	575	26.0	8.7	1.9	.8	1.0	7.9
LaMelo Ball	PG	72	69	2,017	347	514	87	17	1,445	28.0	4.8	7.1	1.2	.3	20.1
Ryan Kalkbrenner	C	69	31	1,479	377	54	32	101	521	21.4	5.5	.8	.5	1.5	7.6
Brandon Miller	SF	65	65	1,968	319	217	66	44	1,311	30.3	4.9	3.3	1.0	.7	20.2
Josh Green	SG	58	0	908	102	47	35	6	249	15.7	1.8	.8	.6	.1	4.3
Tre Mann	PG	53	1	668	92	86	25	5	291	12.6	1.7	1.6	.5	.1	5.5
Pat Connaughton	SG	42	0	297	61	18	11	1	110	7.1	1.5	.4	.3	.0	2.6
Collin Sexton^{†}	SG	42	12	938	80	157	36	7	596	22.3	1.9	3.7	.9	.2	14.2
Tidjane Salaün	PF	37	0	575	149	27	16	7	222	15.5	4.0	.7	.4	.2	6.0
Grant Williams	PF	36	3	711	142	56	17	18	252	19.8	3.9	1.6	.5	.5	7.0
Liam McNeeley	SF	31	0	368	73	24	5	3	132	11.9	2.4	.8	.2	.1	4.3
Coby White^{†}	SG	21	0	406	62	64	5	3	328	19.3	3.0	3.0	.2	.1	15.6
Xavier Tillman Sr.^{†}	C	16	0	72	18	8	3	3	13	4.5	1.1	.5	.2	.2	.8
Mason Plumlee^{†}	C	14	2	125	40	14	6	0	26	8.9	2.9	1.1	.4	.0	1.9
KJ Simpson^{†}	PG	14	2	223	29	35	15	0	84	15.9	2.1	2.5	1.1	.0	6.0
PJ Hall^{†}	C	12	2	187	66	8	3	8	73	15.6	5.5	.7	.3	.7	6.1
Antonio Reeves	SG	10	0	68	8	3	1	0	27	6.8	.8	.3	.1	.0	2.7
Drew Peterson	PF	6	0	64	9	2	3	1	5	10.7	1.5	.3	.5	.2	.8

- ^{†} Denotes player spent time with another team in the season. Stats reflect time with the Hornets only.

== Transactions ==
=== Trades ===
June 29, 2025
To Charlotte Hornets

• (United States) Collin Sexton
• 2030 second-round pick
To Utah Jazz

• (Bosnia and Herzegovina) Jusuf Nurkić
June 30, 2025
To Charlotte Hornets

• (Serbia) Vasilije Micić
• Draft rights to (United States) Liam McNeeley (No. 29)
• 2029 first-round pick
To Phoenix Suns

• (United States) Mark Williams
• 2029 PHX second-round pick
July 6, 2025
To Charlotte Hornets

• (United States) Pat Connaughton
To Milwaukee Bucks

• (Serbia) Vasilije Micić
• 2031 second-round pick
• 2032 second-round pick
February 4, 2026
To Charlotte Hornets

• (France) Ousmane Dieng
• 2029 second-round pick (the more favorable of the picks originally belonging to Atlanta and Miami)
To Oklahoma City Thunder

• (United States) Mason Plumlee
February 4, 2026
To Charlotte Hornets

• (United States) Coby White
• (United States) Mike Conley Jr.
To Chicago Bulls

• (France) Ousmane Dieng
• (United States) Collin Sexton
• 2029 second-round pick (the less favorable of the picks originally belonging to Charlotte and Denver)
• 2031 NYK second-round pick
• 2031 DEN second-round pick

February 4, 2026
To Charlotte Hornets

(United States) Tyus Jones
To Orlando Magic

Cash considerations

=== Free agency ===
==== Re-signed ====
Date	Player	Ref.
July 13, 2025	(United States) Tre Mann	

==== Additions ====
Date	Player	Former Team	Ref.
July 13, 2025	(United States) Spencer Dinwiddie	Dallas Mavericks	

==== Subtractions ====
Date	Player	Reason	New Team	Ref.
October 1, 2025	(United States) Seth Curry	Free agency	Golden State Warriors	
