= 2005–06 UCF Golden Knights men's basketball team =

American college basketball season

2005–06 UCF Golden Knights men's basketball
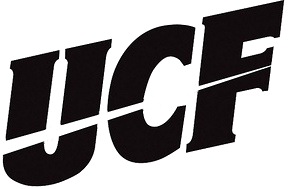
- Conference: Conference USA
- Record: 14–15 (7–7 C-USA)
- Head coach: Kirk Speraw
- Assistant coaches: Tom Schuberth; Craig Brown; Dwight Evans
- Home arena: UCF Arena

2005–06 Conference USA men's basketball standings
	Conf.				Overall
Team	W		L	PCT	W		L	PCT
No. 4 Memphis†	13	–	1	.929	33	–	4	.892
No. 25 UAB	12	–	2	.857	24	–	7	.774
UTEP	11	–	3	.786	21	–	10	.677
Houston	9	–	5	.643	21	–	10	.677
UCF	7	–	7	.500	14	–	15	.483
Rice	6	–	8	.429	12	–	16	.429
Tulane	6	–	8	.429	12	–	17	.414
Tulsa	6	–	8	.429	11	–	17	.393
Marshall	5	–	9	.357	12	–	16	.429
SMU	4	–	10	.286	13	–	16	.448
Southern Miss	3	–	11	.214	10	–	21	.323
East Carolina	2	–	12	.143	8	–	20	.286
† 2006 C-USA Tournament winner Rankings from AP Poll

The 2005–06 UCF Golden Knights men's basketball team was an NCAA Division I college basketball team that represented the University of Central Florida and competed in Conference USA. They played their home games at the UCF Arena in Orlando, Florida, and were led by head coach Kirk Speraw, who was in his 13th season with the team. In the previous year, the Golden Knights finished the season 24–9, 13–7 in A-Sun play.

The 2005–06 season marked the first year that UCF played as members of Conference USA. From 1992 to 2005, the Golden Knights were members of the Atlantic Sun Conference, making four appearances in the NCAA tournament during that time.

== Roster ==
2005–06 UCF Knights men's basketball team
Players
Coaches

Pos.	#	Name	Height	Weight	Year	Hometown
G	1	Jermaine Taylor	6 ft 4 in (1.93 m)	195 lb (88 kg)	Fr	Tavares, FL
F	2	Lavell Payne	6 ft 8 in (2.03 m)	210 lb (95 kg)	Jr	Fort Lauderdale, FL
G	3	Dave Noel	6 ft 3 in (1.91 m)	205 lb (93 kg)	So	Boynton Beach, FL
G	4	Mike O'Donnell	6 ft 0 in (1.83 m)	185 lb (84 kg)	So	Largo, FL
G	5	Mike Battle	6 ft 4 in (1.93 m)	205 lb (93 kg)	Jr	Waldorf, MD
G	10	Drew Speraw	6 ft 2 in (1.88 m)	165 lb (75 kg)	Fr	Oviedo, FL
F	13	Kenrick Zondervan	6 ft 9 in (2.06 m)	215 lb (98 kg)	Fr	Hoofddorp, Holland
G	20	Troy Lindbeck	6 ft 3 in (1.91 m)	185 lb (84 kg)	Sr	Collinsville, IL.
G	21	Justin Rose	6 ft 3 in (1.91 m)	195 lb (88 kg)	Sr	Junction City, KS
F	22	Marcus Johnson	6 ft 7 in (2.01 m)	235 lb (107 kg)	Sr	Wayne, MI
C	25	Adam Gill	6 ft 9 in (2.06 m)	225 lb (102 kg)	So	Springboro, OH
F	30	Josh Peppers	6 ft 6 in (1.98 m)	200 lb (91 kg)	Jr	Memphis, TN
G	32	Curt Scully	6 ft 1 in (1.85 m)	185 lb (84 kg)	Fr	Manchester, NH
F	34	Jacob Loucks (redshirt)	6 ft 7 in (2.01 m)	210 lb (95 kg)	Jr	Clearwater, FL
C	35	Will Bakanowsky	6 ft 9 in (2.06 m)	240 lb (109 kg)	Sr	Gibbsboro, NJ

Head coach

- Kirk Speraw (Iowa)

Assistant coach(es)

- Tom Schuberth (Mississippi State)
- Craig Brown (Florida)
- Dwight Evans (Birmingham–Southern)

Legend

- (C) Team captain
- (S) Suspended
- (I) Ineligible
- (W) Walk-on
- Injured
- Current redshirt

Roster
Last update: March 2006

== Schedule and results ==
Date time, TV	Rank^{#}	Opponent^{#}	Result	Record	Site city, state
Exhibition
November 9, 2005*; 7:30 pm		Barry	W 70–53	1–0	UCF Arena; Orlando, FL
Regular season (non-conference play)
November 18, 2005*; 8:00 pm		Rollins	W 68–58	1–0	UCF Arena (3,061); Orlando, FL
November 22, 2005*; 7:30 pm		Nova Southeastern	W 86–67	2–0	UCF Arena (1,171); Orlando, FL
November 26, 2005*; 7:30 pm		Stetson	W 74–66	3–0	UCF Arena (1,151); Orlando, FL
November 29, 2005*; 7:30 pm		Bethune-Cookman	W 61–48	4–0	UCF Arena (1,215); Orlando, FL
December 3, 2005*; 12:00 pm		at No. 11 Florida	L 47–80	4–1	O'Connell Center (9,125); Gainesville, FL
December 13, 2005*; 7:00 pm		at FAU	L 54–59	4–2	FAU Arena (1,343); Boca Raton, FL
December 16, 2005*; 7:30 pm		Norfolk State	W 63–47	5–2	UCF Arena (987); Orlando, FL
December 19, 2005*; 6:00 pm		vs. Western Kentucky; Fiesta Bowl Classic	L 68–73	5–3	McKale Center (14,577); Tucson, AZ
December 21, 2005*; 6:00 pm		vs. Sam Houston State; Fiesta Bowl Classic	L 63–68	5–4	McKale Center (14,589); Tucson, AZ
December 29, 2005*; 8:00 pm		North Florida; UCF Holiday Classic	W 69–57	6–4	UCF Arena (1,123); Orlando, FL
December 30, 2005*; 8:00 pm		Birmingham–Southern; UCF Holiday Classic	L 50–58	6–5	UCF Arena (882); Orlando, FL
January 3, 2006*; 7:00 pm		at No. 19 Kentucky	L 57–59	6–6	Rupp Arena (21,329); Lexington, KY
Regular season (C-USA conference play)
January 11, 2006; 7:30 pm		Marshall	L 69–73	6–7 (0–1)	UCF Arena (2,871); Orlando, FL
January 14, 2006; 8:00 pm		at Houston	W 66–56	7–7 (1–1)	Hofheinz Pavilion (4,224); Houston, TX
January 18, 2006*; 7:30 pm		South Dakota State	L 64–69	7–8	UCF Arena (1,412); Orlando, FL
January 21, 2006; 7:30 pm		Tulsa	W 45–44	8–8 (2–1)	UCF Arena (1,861); Orlando, FL
January 25, 2006; 7:00 pm		at East Carolina	W 64–59	9–8 (3–1)	Williams Arena at Minges Coliseum (4,460); Greenville, NC
January 28, 2006; 1:00 pm		at No. 3 Memphis	L 61–94	9–9 (3–2)	FedExForum (15,177); Memphis, TN
February 4, 2006; 3:00 pm		UAB	L 68–75	9–10 (3–3)	UCF Arena (2,062); Orlando, FL
February 8, 2006; 8:00 pm		at Southern Mississippi	L 51–59	9–11 (3–4)	Reed Green Coliseum (3,427); Hattiesburg, MS
February 11, 2006; 7:30 pm		Tulane	W 72–51	10–11 (4–4)	UCF Arena (1,318); Orlando, FL
February 15, 2006; 7:30 pm		Houston	L 71–78	10–12 (4–5)	UCF Arena (1,031); Orlando, FL
February 18, 2006; 8:00 pm		at SMU	L 55–77	10–13 (4–6)	Moody Coliseum (2,241); Dallas, TX
February 22, 2006; 7:30 pm		East Carolina	W 69–49	11–13 (5–6)	UCF Arena (1,051); Orlando, FL
February 25, 2006; 7:00 pm, CSTV		at Rice	W 77–64	12–13 (6–6)	Reliant Arena (1,976); Houston, TX
March 1, 2006; 7:00 pm		at Marshall	L 61–73	12–14 (6–7)	Cam Henderson Center (4,306); Huntington, WV
March 4, 2006; 7:30 pm		UTEP	W 66–55	13–14 (7–7)	UCF Arena (1,929); Orlando, FL
C-USA tournament
March 8, 2006; 9:30 pm		vs. East Carolina	W 65–52	14–14	FedExForum (9,175); Memphis, TN
March 9, 2006; 9:30 pm		vs. Houston	L 52–71	14–15	FedExForum (11,343); Memphis, TN
*Non-conference game. Rankings from AP poll. All times are in Eastern Time.
