= Shawne Williams =

American basketball player (born 1986)

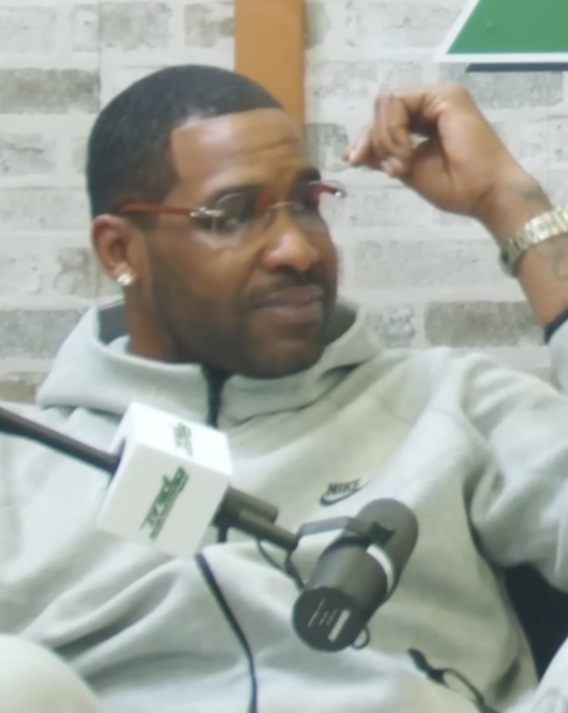
- Williams in 2023

Personal information
- Born: February 16, 1986 (age 40) Memphis, Tennessee, U.S.
- Listed height: 6 ft 10 in (2.08 m)
- Listed weight: 230 lb (104 kg)

Career information
- High school: Hamilton (Memphis, Tennessee); Laurinburg Institute (Laurinburg, North Carolina)
- College: Memphis (2005–2006)
- NBA draft: 2006: 1st round, 17th overall pick
- Drafted by: Indiana Pacers
- Playing career: 2006–2019
- Position: Small forward / power forward
- Number: 4, 3, 7, 43

Career history
- 2006–2008: Indiana Pacers
- 2008–2010: Dallas Mavericks
- 2010–2011: New York Knicks
- 2011–2012: New Jersey Nets
- 2013: Guangzhou Liu Sui
- 2013–2014: Los Angeles Lakers
- 2014: Los Angeles D-Fenders
- 2014: Los Angeles Lakers
- 2014–2015: Miami Heat
- 2015: Detroit Pistons
- 2017–2018: Iowa Wolves
- 2019: Al-Riffa

Career highlights
- Third-team All-Conference USA (2006); Conference USA Freshman of the Year (2006); Conference USA All-Freshman team (2006); Conference USA tournament MVP (2006)
- Stats at NBA.com
- Stats at Basketball Reference

Shawne Brian Williams (born February 16, 1986) is an American former professional basketball player. He played college basketball for the Memphis Tigers before being selected 17th overall in the 2006 NBA draft by the Indiana Pacers.

== High school career ==
Considered a five-star recruit by Rivals.com, Williams was listed as the No. 5 shooting guard and the No. 15 player in the nation in 2005.

== College career ==
In his freshman year of 2005–06 at Memphis, Williams averaged 13.2 points and 6.2 rebounds per game while also averaging 1.4 steals and blocks, playing in 36 games while starting 34. He led all Conference USA freshmen in scoring and rebounding. Williams averaged 18.0 points and 6.7 rebounds in three games in the Conference USA tournament, being named the tournament MVP. He can also play at the guard position.

== Professional career ==
Williams signed with the Indiana Pacers July 6, 2006. Williams scored 13 points in his NBA debut against the Chicago Bulls on December 11, 2006. On October 10, 2008, Williams was traded to the Dallas Mavericks for Eddie Jones, two first-round draft picks and cash.

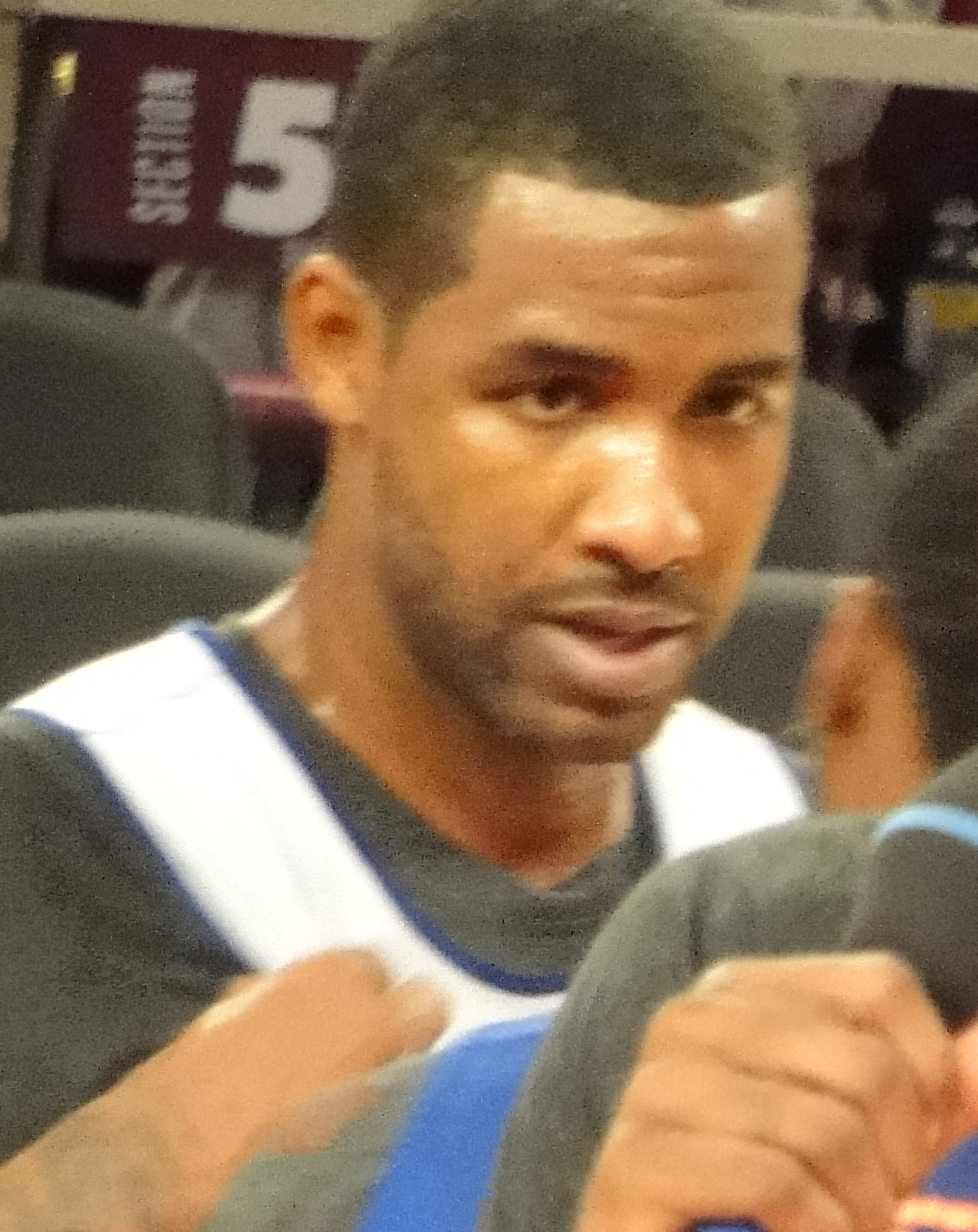
Williams as part of the Knicks in 2010

On January 11, 2010, the Mavericks traded him and Kris Humphries to the New Jersey Nets for Eduardo Nájera. Four days later, the Nets waived Williams. On September 23, 2010, the New York Knicks signed Williams to a one-year contract. Williams had his best season with New York, playing a key role off the bench for the team as the Knicks reached the 2011 NBA playoffs.

On December 15, 2011, the New Jersey Nets signed Williams to a two-year contract, beating the offer made by the New York Knicks. On March 15, 2012, the Nets traded Williams, Mehmet Okur, and a 2012 first-round draft pick to the Portland Trail Blazers for veteran small forward Gerald Wallace. Williams never appeared in a game for Portland.

In early 2013, Williams joined Guangzhou Liu Sui for the 2013 NBL season. On September 3, 2013, Williams signed with the Los Angeles Lakers. He was waived on January 7, 2014, the deadline before his contract would become guaranteed. The Lakers had injuries to guards Kobe Bryant, Steve Nash, Steve Blake, Jordan Farmar, and Xavier Henry, and wanted to free up Williams' roster spot and salary in the event they later need another replacement at guard. On January 27, 2014, Williams was acquired by the Los Angeles D-Fenders of the NBA D-League. On February 6, 2014, he re-signed with the Lakers to a 10-day contract. He did not sign a second 10-day contract with the Lakers after his first 10-day contract expired. On February 19, 2014, he was re-acquired by the D-Fenders.

On August 1, 2014, Williams signed with the Miami Heat, rejoining former Pacers teammate Danny Granger. On February 19, 2015, Williams was traded to the New Orleans Pelicans in a three-team trade involving the Phoenix Suns. Three days later, he was waived by the Pelicans. On February 24, 2015, Williams was claimed off waivers by the Detroit Pistons. On June 11, 2015, Williams was traded, along with Caron Butler, to the Milwaukee Bucks in exchange for Ersan İlyasova. However, he was later waived by the Bucks on June 30, 2015.

In October 2017, Williams joined the Iowa Wolves in the NBA G League. On January 21, 2019, Williams was reported to have joined the Al-Riffa of the Bahraini Premier League.

== Personal life ==
On September 11, 2007, Williams was arrested in Indianapolis, Indiana on a charge of possession of marijuana. Two passengers in Williams' car were also arrested. One was charged with possession of marijuana, the other was charged with possession of a stolen handgun.

In January 2010, Williams was arrested in Memphis on felony drug charges for selling a codeine substance. Williams later pleaded guilty in April to misdemeanor drug possession. He was placed on six months' probation, ordered to undergo mandatory drug testing, attend a drug offender school and make a $10,000 contribution to the Shelby County Drug Treatment Court. His legal situation cleared up quickly.

During the summer of 2010, Williams received training camp invitations from two teams: the New York Knicks and Charlotte Bobcats. Williams' older brother, who was murdered, last saw him play at the Madison Square Garden. As a result of this sentimental connection, Williams chose to attend the Knicks' training camp.

On December 13, 2012, Williams was arrested again in Memphis on drug charges after a police officer smelled marijuana coming from a Porsche in a parking lot near a mall. In the car, officers found a partially smoked joint of marijuana, as well as another joint and a bottle of codeine cough syrup that was not prescribed to Williams.

From 2011 to 2013 Williams dated Little Rock model Molly Mclane.

As of 2024, Williams is married to rapper and Love & Hip Hop: Atlanta cast member Jessica Dime. They have a daughter named "Blessing" born in 2018 and a son named "Wisdom" born in 2023.

== NBA career statistics ==
Legend
GP	Games played	GS	Games started	MPG	Minutes per game
FG%	Field goal percentage	3P%	3-point field goal percentage	FT%	Free throw percentage
RPG	Rebounds per game	APG	Assists per game	SPG	Steals per game
BPG	Blocks per game	PPG	Points per game	**Bold**	Career high

=== Regular season ===
Year	Team	GP	GS	MPG	FG%	3P%	FT%	RPG	APG	SPG	BPG	PPG
2006–07	Indiana	46	3	12.1	**.469**	.365	.550	1.8	.5	.1	.2	3.9
2007–08	Indiana	**65**	3	14.9	.427	.314	.717	2.7	**.9**	.4	.4	6.7
2008–09	Dallas	15	0	11.3	.286	.059	.818	3.1	.1	.1	.6	2.8
2010–11	New York	64	11	20.7	.426	**.401**	.837	3.7	.7	**.6**	**.8**	**7.1**
2011–12	New Jersey	25	6	20.6	.286	.241	.727	2.7	.6	.4	.4	4.5
2013–14	L.A. Lakers	36	13	20.9	.380	.326	.700	**4.6**	.8	.5	**.8**	5.6
2014–15	Miami	44	**22**	**21.0**	.425	.395	.848	3.2	.8	.5	.4	6.6
2014–15	Detroit	19	0	8.6	.317	.154	**1.000**	1.4	.4	.2	.2	2.6
Career		314	58	17.1	.403	.339	.755	3.0	.7	.4	.5	5.6

=== Playoffs ===
Year	Team	GP	GS	MPG	FG%	3P%	FT%	RPG	APG	SPG	BPG	PPG
2011	New York	4	0	25.3	.417	.429	.750	3.5	1.3	1.0	1.0	8.0
Career		4	0	25.3	.417	.429	.750	3.5	1.3	1.0	1.0	8.0
