= 2006 Conference USA men's basketball tournament =

- Classification: Division I
- Season: 2005–06
- Teams: 12
- Site: FedExForum; Memphis, TN
- Champions: Memphis (1st title)
- Winning coach: John Calipari (1st title)
- MVP: Shawne Williams (Memphis)

2005–06 Conference USA men's basketball standings
	Conf.				Overall
Team	W		L	PCT	W		L	PCT
No. 4 Memphis†	13	–	1	.929	33	–	4	.892
No. 25 UAB	12	–	2	.857	24	–	7	.774
UTEP	11	–	3	.786	21	–	10	.677
Houston	9	–	5	.643	21	–	10	.677
UCF	7	–	7	.500	14	–	15	.483
Rice	6	–	8	.429	12	–	16	.429
Tulane	6	–	8	.429	12	–	17	.414
Tulsa	6	–	8	.429	11	–	17	.393
Marshall	5	–	9	.357	12	–	16	.429
SMU	4	–	10	.286	13	–	16	.448
Southern Miss	3	–	11	.214	10	–	21	.323
East Carolina	2	–	12	.143	8	–	20	.286
† 2006 C-USA Tournament winner Rankings from AP Poll

The 2006 Conference USA men's basketball tournament was held March 8–11 at the FedExForum in Memphis, Tennessee.

Top-seeded Memphis defeated UAB in the championship game, 57–46, to clinch their first Conference USA men's tournament championship. It would be the Tigers' first of seven C-USA titles in an eight-year period.

The Tigers, in turn, received an automatic bid to the 2006 NCAA tournament. They were joined in the tournament by fellow C-USA member UAB, who earned an at-large bid.

== Format ==
Conference USA saw some drastic changes to its membership prior to the season. Eight teams, Charlotte (Atlantic 10), Cincinnati (Big East), DePaul (Big East), Louisville (Big East), Marquette (Big East), Saint Louis (Atlantic 10), South Florida (Big East), and TCU (Mountain West), departed the conference, while six new teams were added, Marshall (MAC), Rice (WAC), SMU (WAC), Tulsa (WAC), UCF (Sun Belt), and UTEP (WAC). Total membership settled at twelve teams.

Even with all of the newly departed and -added teams, the tournament's format remained exactly the same. The top four teams were given byes into the quarterfinal round while the next eight teams were placed into the first round. All remaining tournament seeds were determined by regular season conference records.

== Bracket ==
First round Wednesday, March 8
9	Marshall	58
8	Tulane	64
5	UCF	65
12	East Carolina	52
11	Southern Miss	66
6	Tulsa	61
7	Rice	59
10	SMU	61

Quarterfinals; Thursday, March 9
1	#5 Memphis	75
8	Tulane	56
5	UCF	52
4	Houston	71
3	UTEP	66
11	Southern Miss	47
10	SMU	55
2	#24 UAB	69

Semifinals; Friday, March 10
1	#5 Memphis	68
4	Houston	54
3	UTEP	60
2	#24 UAB	63

Championship; Saturday, March 11
1	#5 Memphis	57
2	#24 UAB	46
