= Charles Lee (basketball) =

American basketball player & coach (born 1984)

Charlotte Hornets
- Title: Head coach
- League: NBA

Personal information
- Born: November 11, 1984 (age 42) Washington, D.C., U.S.
- Listed height: 6 ft 3 in (1.91 m)
- Listed weight: 210 lb (95 kg)

Career information
- High school: Quince Orchard (Gaithersburg, Maryland)
- College: Bucknell (2002–2006)
- NBA draft: 2006: undrafted
- Playing career: 2006–2010
- Position: Shooting guard
- Coaching career: 2012–present

Career history

Playing
- 2006–2007: Hapoel Gilboa/Afula
- 2007–2008: R.B.C. Verviers-Pepinster
- 2008–2009: BG Göttingen
- 2009–2010: Artland Dragons

Coaching
- 2012–2014: Bucknell (assistant)
- 2014–2018: Atlanta Hawks (assistant)
- 2018–2023: Milwaukee Bucks (assistant)
- 2023–2024: Boston Celtics (assistant)
- 2024–present: Charlotte Hornets

Career highlights
- As player: Patriot League Player of the Year (2006); 2× Patriot League tournament MVP (2005, 2006); As assistant coach: 2× NBA champion (2021, 2024)

Charles Lee (born November 11, 1984) is an American professional basketball coach and former player who is the head coach for the Charlotte Hornets of the National Basketball Association (NBA). He is a two-time NBA champion, having won his first championship with the Milwaukee Bucks as an assistant coach. He was previously an assistant coach of the Boston Celtics, helping to coach them to the 2024 NBA playoffs, where he won his second NBA championship. A 6' 3" guard from Bucknell University, he spent most of his professional career in Israel and Europe.

== College career ==
The 2006 Patriot League Player of the Year, Lee helped guide Bucknell to two straight Patriot League championships and two straight NCAA tournament second-round appearances. In four seasons with the Bison, he earned First Team All-Patriot League honors twice (2004, 2005) and Second Team All-Patriot League honors once (2003). He finished his career at Bucknell with 1,147 career points (11.0 ppg), 568 rebounds (5.5 rpg) and 167 steals (1.61 spg).

Lee enrolled at Bucknell a year before the school started offering athletic scholarships, and never received anything more than partial financial aid. The New York Times called him "[one of] college basketball's best nonscholarship players". At Bucknell, Lee majored in business.

== Professional career ==
After graduating from Bucknell in 2006, Lee played with the San Antonio Spurs during the NBA's summer league and pre-season, but he did not make the regular-season roster. He has since played for Hapoel Gilboa/Afula in Israel, Verviers-Pepinster in Belgium and MEG Goettingen and Artland Dragons in Germany. After retiring from basketball, Lee worked on Wall Street for Merrill Lynch.

== Coaching career ==
=== Assistant coach (2012–2024) ===
On June 25, 2012, Bucknell announced that Lee was returning to his alma mater as an assistant men's basketball coach.

On August 20, 2014, the Atlanta Hawks announced that Lee had been hired as an assistant coach on head coach Mike Budenholzer's staff.

After Budenholzer parted ways with the Hawks and became the head coach of the Milwaukee Bucks, Lee would move to Milwaukee and join Budenholzer's staff as an assistant coach in 2018. After the departure of top assistant coach Darvin Ham to the Los Angeles Lakers in 2022, Lee would ascend to become the associate head coach of the Bucks.

On June 11, 2023, it was reported that Lee would be hired by the Boston Celtics as their top assistant coach.

=== Charlotte Hornets (2024–present) ===
On May 9, 2024, Lee was hired to be the new head coach of the Charlotte Hornets. He officially joined the team following the Celtics' victory in the NBA Finals.

On May 7, 2026, Lee and the Hornets agreed to a multiyear contract extension.

== Head coaching record ==
=== NBA ===
Legend
Regular season	G	Games coached	W	Games won	L	Games lost	W–L %	Win–loss %
Playoffs	PG	Playoff games	PW	Playoff wins	PL	Playoff losses	PW–L %	Playoff win–loss %

Team	Year	G	W	L	W–L%	Finish	PG	PW	PL	PW–L%	Result
Charlotte	2024–25	82	19	63	.232	4th in Southeast	—	—	—	—	Missed playoffs
Charlotte	2025–26	82	44	38	.537	3rd in Southeast	—	—	—	—	Missed playoffs
Career		164	63	101	.384		—	—	—	—	
