= Avirex =

American clothing company

- Industry: Fashion Apparel
- Founded: 1975
- Headquarters: Bernardsville, New Jersey, United States
- Key people: Jeff Clyman, Founder; Marc Ecko, Prior Owner
- Products: Designer clothing
- Website: https://www.avirex.com

Avirex is an American clothing brand founded by Jeff Clyman in 1975 in New York City. Avirex was a leader in creating leather bomber jackets for the US market. Avirex was not a U.S. military supplier during World War II, but did supply aviation apparel for the U.S. Air Force in the 1980s by re-issuing the A-2 jacket. In 2006, Clyman sold Avirex to the entrepreneur Marc Ecko. The current owner of the Avirex brand in the United States is Centric Brands.

== See also ==
- Alpha Industries
- Schott NYC
- Pelle Pelle
- Eckō
