= NBA cheerleading =

Cheerleading in American professional basketball

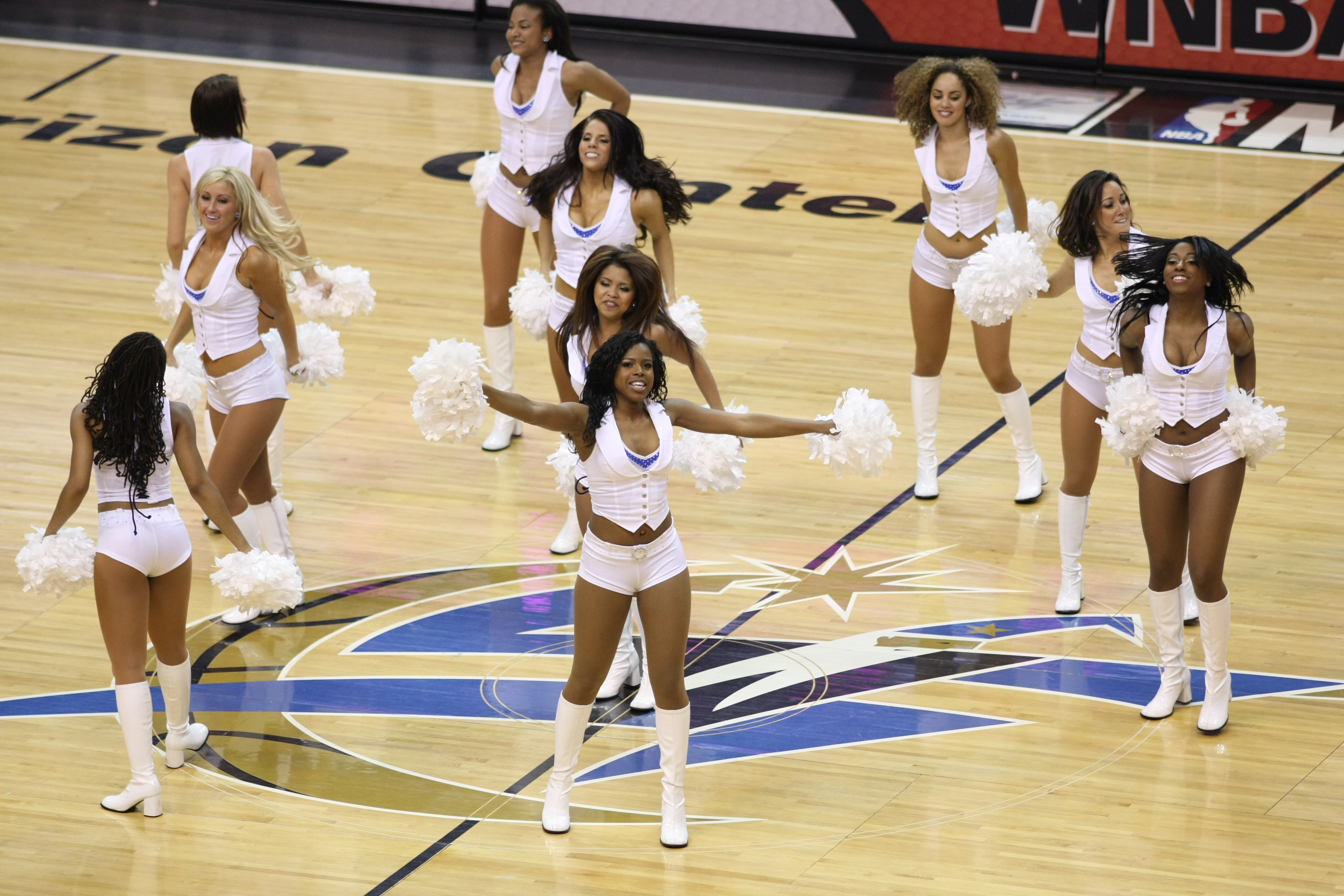
Washington Wizards cheerleaders at the Verizon Center.

The National Basketball Association (NBA) is a professional basketball league with teams in the United States and Canada. Nearly every team, with one exception, has a squad of dancers for cheerleading that are usually involved in dancing, charity work, fundraisers, and modeling. Recently, some NBA teams have expanded their previously all-girl teams to be more inclusive as part of efforts to appeal to a broader and rapidly growing audience.

== Teams ==
NBA Team	Name
Atlanta Hawks	A-Town Dancers
Boston Celtics	Celtics Dancers and Green Team
Brooklyn Nets	Brooklynettes
Charlotte Hornets	Charlotte Honey Bees
Chicago Bulls	Chicago Luvabulls and Chicago Incredibulls
Cleveland Cavaliers	Cavs PowerHouse Dance Team
Dallas Mavericks	D-Town Crew (formerly Mavs Dancers)
Denver Nuggets	Nuggets Dancers
Detroit Pistons	Automotion
Golden State Warriors	Warrior Girls
Houston Rockets	Clutch City Dancers
Indiana Pacers	Pacemates
Los Angeles Clippers	Spirit Dance Team
Los Angeles Lakers	Laker Girls
Memphis Grizzlies	Grizz Girls
Miami Heat	HEAT Dancers
Milwaukee Bucks	Energee
Minnesota Timberwolves	Timberwolves Dance Team
New Orleans Pelicans	Pelicans Dance Team
New York Knicks	Knicks City Dancers
Oklahoma City Thunder	Thunder Girls
Orlando Magic	Magic Dancers
Philadelphia 76ers	Sixers Dancers
Phoenix Suns	Suns Dancers
Portland Trail Blazers	Blazer Dancers and Blazers Stunt Team
Sacramento Kings	Kings Royal Court Dancers
Toronto Raptors	North Side Crew (formerly Dance Pak)
Utah Jazz	Jazz Dancers
Washington Wizards	Wizards Dancers

The only team currently without traditional NBA dancers is the San Antonio Spurs. Until 2018, they had a dance squad called the Silver Dancers.

== Notable NBA cheerleaders ==
=== Atlanta Hawks ===
- Deneen Graham (1994) – Miss North Carolina 1983
- Kaylin Reque (2008–11) – Miss Georgia USA 2011
- Laurie Flynn – wife of Matt Schaub

=== Boston Celtics ===
- Michelle Leonardo (2013–present) – Miss New Jersey USA 2012

=== Brooklyn Nets ===
- Melissa Becraft (2017–present) – dancer, TikToker
- Cassie Yeung (2016–2018) – Chef, TikToker

=== Chicago Bulls ===
- Shanon Lersch (2004–09) – Miss Illinois USA 2008
- Ashley Bond (2007–13) – Miss Illinois USA 2009

Maya Hayes (1996–1999) – dancer and choreographer Currently the Founder and President of the National Basketball Dancer Alumni Club est. 2023. She also served as the game day entertainment coordinator and choreographer for the Jr. Basketball League under the direction of Mr. LaVar Ball.

=== Dallas Mavericks ===
- Cindy Villarreal (1989–90) – choreographer
- Kandi Harris (2004–05) – wife of Hunter Mahan
- Jill Marie Jones – actress, Toni on Girlfriends
- Maya Hayes (2007–2009) – dancer and choreographer Currently the Founder and President of the National Basketball Dancer Alumni Club est. 2023. She also served as the game day entertainment coordinator and choreographer for the Jr. Basketball League under the direction of Mr. LaVar Ball.

=== Denver Nuggets ===
- Lindsey Kovacevich (2005–07) – anchor and reporter of KVAL-TV

=== Detroit Pistons ===
- Cassandra Ferguson – contestant on The Bachelor season 18
- Heather Zara – traffic reporter of WDIV-TV

=== Golden State Warriors ===
- Bonnie-Jill Laflin (1992–94) – model, actress, television personality

=== Houston Rockets ===
- Natalie Alvarado (1997–2004) – singer and dance team director of the Minnesota Timberwolves
- Casey Potter (2016–2018) – director of the Houston Texans Cheerleaders

=== Indiana Pacers ===
- Angela Sparrow (2006–07) – Miss Illinois USA 2011
- Jocelyn Peck (2013–present) – wife of Stanley Havili

=== Los Angeles Clippers ===
- Eve Torres (2006–07) – wrestler
- Jocelyn Peck (2010–12) – wife of Stanley Havili

=== Los Angeles Lakers ===
- Paula Abdul (1980s) – singer, dancer, choreographer, television personality
- Tina Landon (1980s) – dancer, choreographer
- Emily Harper (2000–03) – actress
- Cindy Leos (2000–01) – dancer, choreographer, celebrity trainer
- Sandra Colton (2002–03) – dancer, author
- Taylour Paige (2010) – dancer, actress
- Leah Van Dale (2010–11) – WWE wrestler
- Natasha Martinez (2011–12) – Miss California USA 2015
- Moon Bloodgood – model, actress
- Vanessa Curry – singer

=== Memphis Grizzlies ===
- Stacey Tookey – dancer, choreographer

=== Miami Heat ===
- Jessica Sutta (1999–2002) – singer, dancer, actress, member of the pop girl group The Pussycat Dolls
- Trista Rehn (2000–02) – contestant on The Bachelor season 1
- Jenni Croft (2005–06) – contestant on The Bachelor season 11
- Layla El (2004–06) – model, dancer, actress, wrestler
- Hennely Jimenez (2006–07) – Actress, starred in the film 200 mph
- Kristina Akra – reporter for Fox Sports South
- Traci Young-Byron – (8 Year Vet) MTV's America's Best Dance Crew Season 3 Lifetime's Bring it Set it up

=== Milwaukee Bucks ===
- Tanya Fischer (2003–04) – Actress of The Defenders
- Bishara Dorre (2008–11) – Miss Wisconsin USA 2014

=== Minnesota Timberwolves ===
- Brittany Thelemann – Miss Minnesota USA 2011

=== New Jersey/Brooklyn Nets ===
- Denise Garvey (1999–2000) – former Dallas Cowboys Cheerleader, former New York Knicks dancer, director of the New York Jets Flight Crew
- Keltie Knight(2003–05) – Television entertainment reporter

=== New Orleans Hornets ===
- Dawn Richard – singer, dancer, former member of Danity Kane

=== New York Knicks ===
- Heather Van Arsdel (1998–2005) – WPTZ news anchor
- Denise Garvey (2001–05) – former Dallas Cowboys Cheerleader, former New Jersey Nets dancer, director of the New York Jets Flight Crew
- Asia Nitollano (2006–07) – singer, dancer, former Pussycat Doll
- Amanda Grace (2008) – director of the New Jersey Devils Ice Dancers
- Sarah Mitchell – dancer, actress
- Sydney Lotuaco (2015–18) – Contestant of The Bachelor season 23

=== Oklahoma City Thunder ===
- Kimberly Sullivan (2008–09) – contestant on The Bachelor season 14
- Ali Dudek – singer (during the team's Seattle days)

=== Orlando Magic ===
- Megan Clementi (2003–08) – Miss Florida USA 2010
- Trinity McCray – WWE wrestler
- Sandy Fox (1988–91) – Voice actress

=== Philadelphia 76ers ===
- Amber-Joi Watkins (2005–07) – Miss Pennsylvania USA 2011

=== Phoenix Suns ===
- Brittany Bell (2006–09) – Miss Arizona USA 2010
- Jenni Croft (2006–09) – contestant on The Bachelor season 11
- Kat Hurd (2013–present) – contestant on The Bachelor season 18
- Tiffany Dunn – singer

=== Portland Trail Blazers ===
- Caysie Torrey (1997–98) – dancer, actress, clothing model
- Shannon Bex (1999–2004) – singer, dancer, former member of Danity Kane

=== Sacramento Kings ===
- Vanessa Born (2001–03) – actress and dancer
- Aubrey Aquino – TV reporter and host

=== Toronto Raptors ===
- Nicole Arbour – YouTube comedian and provocateur
- Nikki Grant (2007–09) – actress

=== Utah Jazz ===
- Tiffany Coyne (2000–02) – Co-host and model on Let's Make a Deal on CBS
- Jocelyn Peck (2007–10) – wife of Stanley Havili
- Jessica Sanchez – morning traffic reporter of WKMG-TV

== See also ==
- NFL cheerleading
- NHL cheerleading
- List of cheerleaders
- Promotional model
