= Marc Ecko's Getting Up: Contents Under Pressure =

2006 video game

- Developer: The Collective (Note: Steam version developed by General Arcade)
- Publisher: Atari (Note: Steam re-release published by Devolver Digital)
- Directors: Richard Hare; Marc Ecko
- Producers: Marwan Abderrazzaq; Rick Watters
- Designers: John Manley; Rudy Pollorena Jr.
- Programmers: Nathan Hunt; William Feng Chen; Kevin Christensen
- Artists: Brian Horton; Ed Schofield
- Writer: Marc Ecko
- Platforms: PlayStation 2; Windows; Xbox; Mobile phone
- Release: NA: February 14, 2006; EU: February 24, 2006
- Genres: Beat 'em up, action-adventure
- Mode: Single-player

Marc Ecko's Getting Up: Contents Under Pressure is a video game released in February 2006 for PlayStation 2, Windows, and Xbox. It was developed by The Collective and published by Atari under license by Ecko Unlimited. There were two editions of the game, one being a limited edition and the other being the normal release. The game was later re-published by Devolver Digital in December 2013 on Steam.

The game focuses on an amateur graffiti artist known as Trane who uses graffiti and tagging as a way to protest against the corrupt dystopic city of New Radius, in a future world where freedom of expression is suppressed by a tyrannical, Orwellian city government. The musical score for the game was produced by hip hop artist RJD2.

== Plot ==
The story begins in the New Radius Slums, where Trane (Coltrane Crowley), against the will of his grandmother, runs away from home to establish himself as a Graffiti artist. His first goal was to set himself as a notorious graffiti artist within the New Radius slums. His exploits reveals the state of New Radius, as a result of Sung's attempts at Gentrification of the city to make it look prosperous. He has oppressed the lower class societies by eliminating the budget of liberal arts for more "prosperous" enterprises in the city, using the C.C.K to keep the slums and the city's seedy reputation suppressed through violence. Trane soon butts heads with the Vandals of New Radius led by Gabe who constantly paints over his works. Realizing he needs to make his crew well known, he successfully tags the city monorail which allows him to show his graffiti around New Radius in the face of both the C.C.K and the VaNR and then defeating Gabe in a Graffiti battle which forces an alliance between both Crews.

Soon enough, however, Trane is incapacitated by Decoy, who tells him about his father's past and how it all connects to Sung's rise to power. He also tells Trane that the anti-graffiti campaign was a smokescreen to prevent artists such as Decoy from revealing the truth: Sung paid Trane's father to assassinate a rival candidate. Decoy had been tagging posters with the phrase "9/06", the day that Sung ordered the murder of Trane's father to cover up his involvement. Taking his revolution to the next step, Trane begins tagging upper New Radius, the pristine part of the city which Sung upheld as the bastion of progress. Amongst the tagging campaign, however, Gabe betrays Trane under the threat of being killed by Shanna, an assassin in the employ of Mayor Sung who uses recent events to make interesting news. This leads to Lower New Radius being attacked by C.C.K death squads, and Decoy's death at the hands of Shanna, (on orders from Sung). Swearing revenge, he plans a smear campaign against Sung by planting flyers which incriminate Sung for his role in the murder of the other candidate. Sung's second-in-command is accidentally killed during a confrontation with Trane. Trane is framed for his "murder". From this point Trane can unleash the "Tag 'n' Bag" attack when his hype meter fills by pressing the X button. Trane defeats Shanna (although she appears to be killed by the fall, she in fact survived, as a helicopter was waiting for her below). While the fight to overthrow Sung has ended, the fight for freedom is never finished for Trane, as he is still wanted by the law.

== Development ==
Marc Ecko has described the challenges of developing the game in interviews. These range from a missed Black Friday release date by saying "The code just wasn't ready" to communicating his vision to the developers:

The gaming community has a natural tendency to take anything cool and make it cartoonish. That was a big learning curve.

and the refusal of classification of the game in one market:

I think it's demonization of graffiti, demonization of technology, the generational disconnect. I think video games are just a misunderstood medium.

The game received press coverage for inclusion of a high profile ensemble cast of voice performances from hip hop artists and celebrities such as Talib Kweli as the main character, Diddy as "Dip", and others including Adam West, Charlie Murphy, Rosario Dawson, Andy Dick, RZA, George Hamilton, and Brittany Murphy, among others. The game also features product placements for both the Nokia 7710 mobile phone used by Trane to take pictures of graffiti pieces throughout the game's world as well as collectible iPods used to unlock music tracks.

A mobile phone version of the game was announced in February 2005. Glu Mobile released it on September 27, 2005. It received 8.4 out of 10 from GameSpot and 8.2 out of 10 from IGN.

On December 12, 2013, Devolver Digital re-released Getting Up: Contents Under Pressure onto Steam after acquiring the rights from the Atari bankruptcy that year.

== Reception ==
Reception

Aggregate scores
| Aggregator | Score |
|---|---|
| GameRankings | 72.26% (Xbox); 71.73% (PS2); 70.36% (PC) |
| Metacritic | 71/100 (Xbox); 69/100 (PS2); 69/100 (PC) |

Review scores
| Publication | Score |
|---|---|
| Game Informer | 7.25/10 (PS2) |
| GamePro | 2.5/5 (PS2) |

Marc Ecko's Getting Up: Contents Under Pressure received average to positive reviews, scoring 69 out of 100 ("Mixed or average reviews") in Metacritic's average. It received positive press from a few outlets, scoring 87% in GamesMaster magazine, and 8.7 out of 10 on GameSpot. Common criticisms were related to the game's presentation, controls, and camera, although many outlets were impressed by the potential of the concept, and hopes for a more refined sequel. Edge magazine gave that title a 4/10 score and thought it ironic that the game was unpolished, given that it is "based on a culture of reputation, craftsmanship and leaving a mark". Official US PlayStation Magazine was disappointed that the game was "so damn serious" in comparison to Jet Set Radio, a title with a similar premise.

In an interview in Metro New York, Ecko was outspoken in his response to these critics, describing gamers as "the guys who got wedgies in high school" and "divas" with a "predisposition to have a bug up their ass for anything urban", who dismissed the game as riding on the coat-tails of Grand Theft Auto solely for having a black character on the cover. The reviewers, he says, are "slaves to the code" and not "slaves to the branding, products, or experience" as he would prefer, and they unfairly compare the game to better-received titles, such as Prince of Persia: The Sands of Time. He admits that the game was "not as precise as I would have liked to see", blaming the game's failures on system limitations "that people just can't understand", and that the title was "as polished as you can make it on a no-hard-drive console like the PS2".

=== Awards ===
- GameSpot's Best Licensed Music Award 2006
- Spike TVs 2006 VGA's Gamer's Choice-Breakthrough Performance award for Rosario Dawson
- Spike TVs 2005 VGA's Best Wireless Game award.
- AIAS' "Outstanding Achievement in Soundtrack" Interactive Achievement Award nomination.

=== Controversy in Australia ===
The Australian ABC News channel has reported that Getting Up was refused classification in Australia after its initial "MA15+" rating was overturned after appeals by Queensland's Local Government Association, effectively banning its release in the country. The Federal Classification Review Board, responsible for reviewing the game and concluding to refused classification of the game (under a majority 3 to 2 decision), cited that the game promotes, and provides instruction for illegal graffiti and real-life graffiti artists. Ecko stated that he was disappointed with this legal move. Other games heavily focusing around graffiti, such as Jet Set Radio, have not been banned. Months earlier, Need for Speed: Most Wanted, a game centered around and glamorising illegal street racing, received a G rating. The game has been available to Australians on Steam since 2013.

== Sequel ==
On February 14, 2013, Ecko Unlimited's Twitter announced that a sequel was in development. No further update has been posted since and it seems that the sequel has been cancelled.

On September 6, 2022, on his official Instagram account, Marc Ecko announced that a film based on the video game was in the works, and that he still hoped to produce a sequel game, but that it was postponed due to his work commitments. He also created a website where the public could sign a letter of support for the film adaptation, a sequel game, and a remaster of the original game.

== Film adaptation ==
On September 6, 2022, Marc Ecko announced on Twitter that a film adaptation of the game was in production, called Getting Up: Legends of New Radius.
