= Jets Flight Crew =

Defunct NFL cheerleader squad

- Established: 2006; 20 years ago
- Defunct: 2022; 4 years ago
- Director: Denise Garvey
- Affiliations: New York Jets
- Formerly called: Jets Flag Crew (2006); Jets Flight Crew (2007–2022)

The Jets Flight Crew were a professional cheerleading squad for the New York Jets of the National Football League. The group was established in 2006 as the Jets Flag Crew, composed of six female flag carriers. In 2007, the group expanded and was renamed the Jets Flight Crew. The squad regularly performed choreographed routines during the team's home contests.

The squad has not appeared in games or online since the end of the 2022 NFL season.

== History ==
=== Jets Flag Crew ===
The Jets Flag Crew was unveiled on October 15, 2006, during the Jets' home game against division rival Miami Dolphins. The team stressed that the crew, composed of females who relieved their male counterparts, were "flag carriers" and not cheerleaders.

=== Jets Flight Crew ===
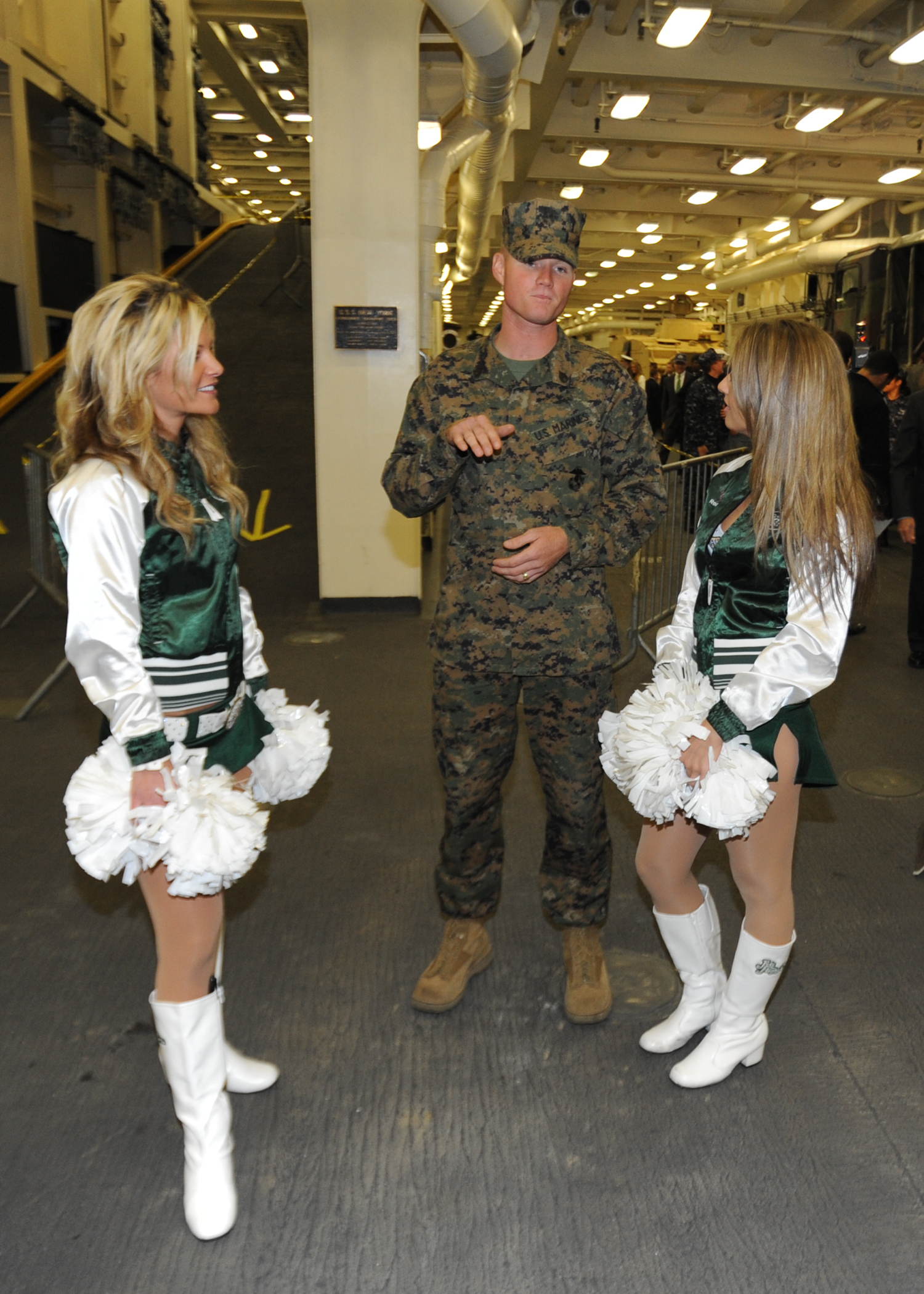
Jets Flight Crew cheerleaders aboard the amphibious transport USS New York (LPD-21)

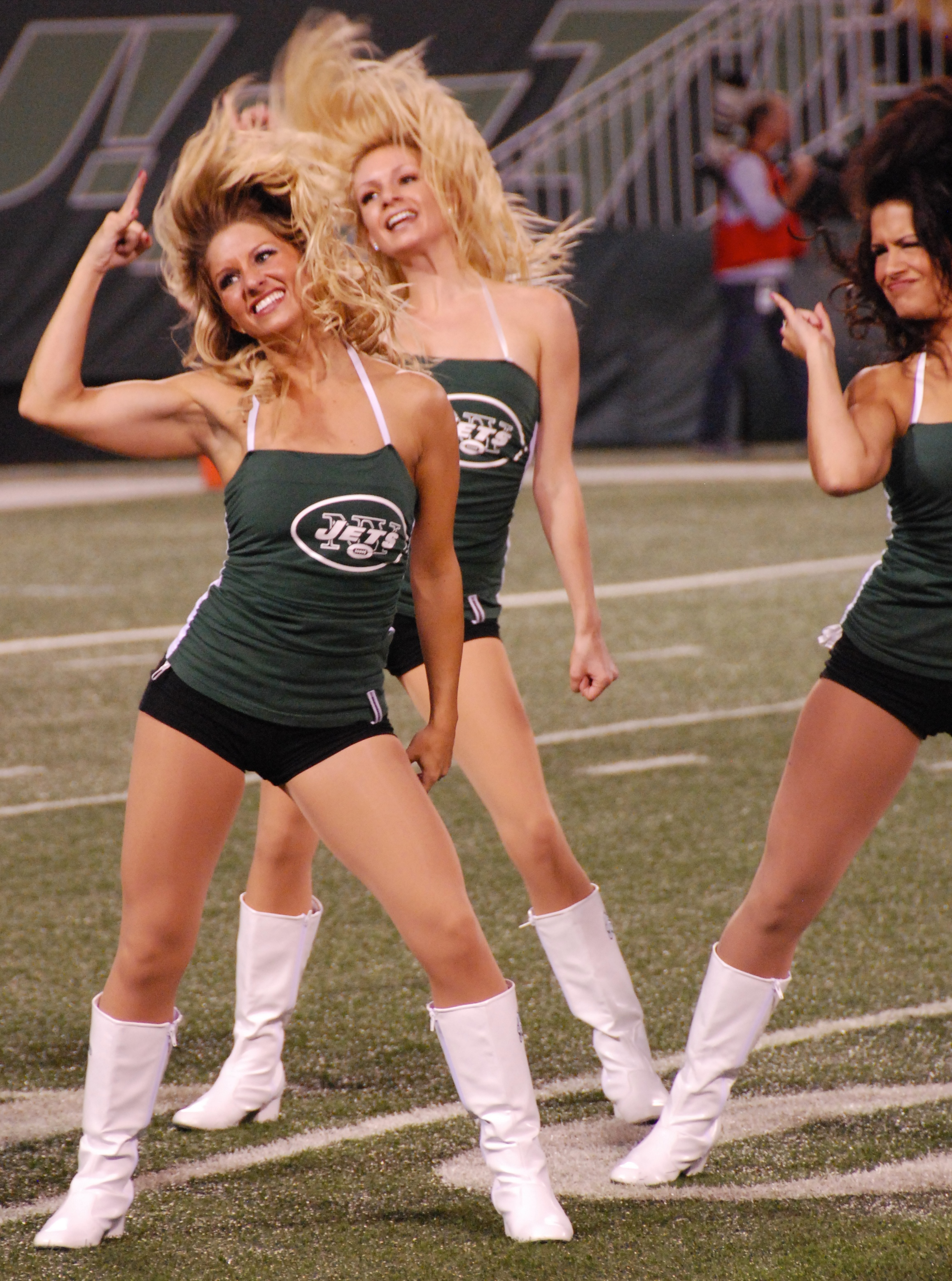
Flight Crew members perform in a 2009 game against the Philadelphia Eagles

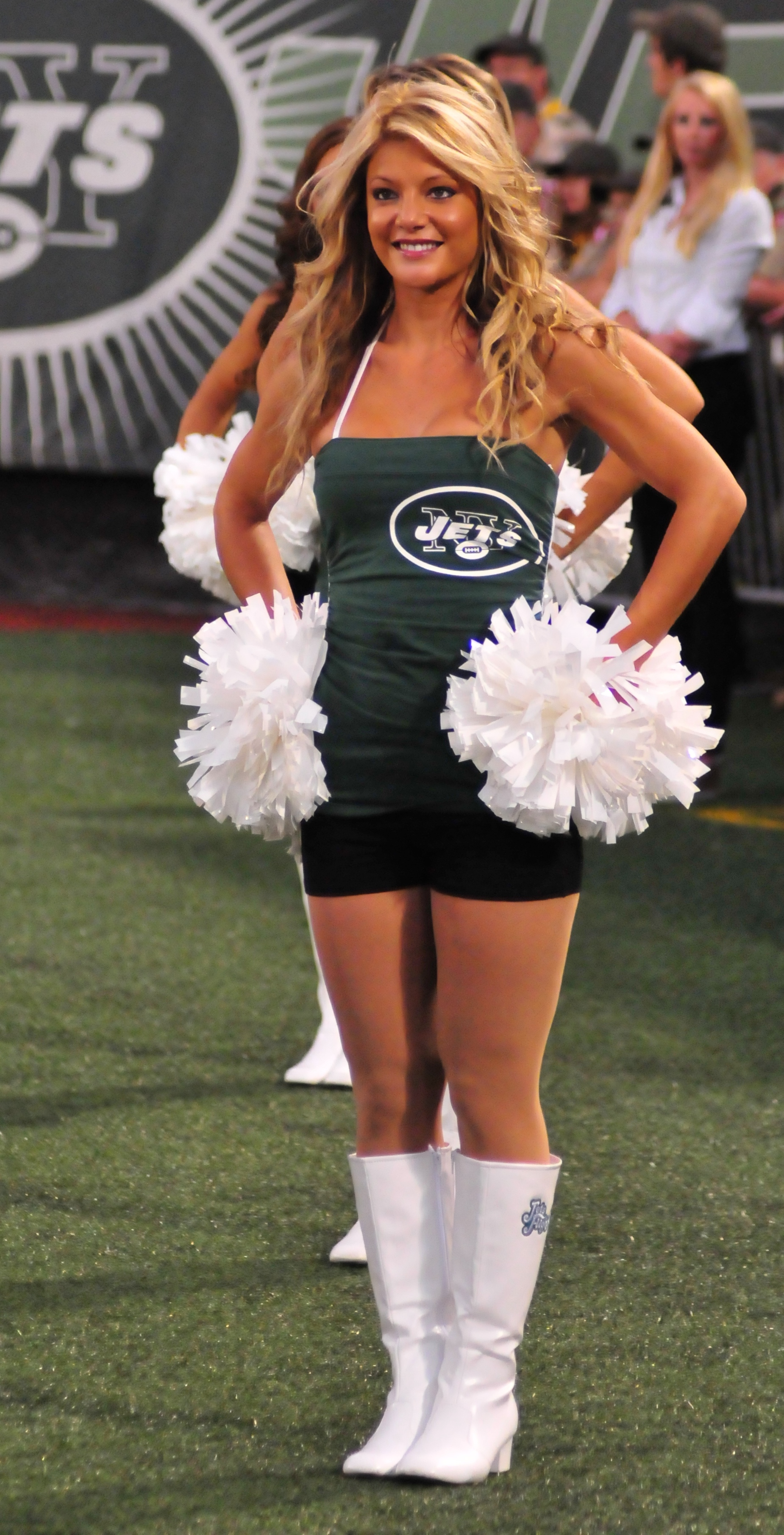
A Flight Crew member in a 2009 game against the Philadelphia Eagles

The Jets officially announced the creation of the Jets Flight Crew on August 7, 2007. The Flag Crew had been well received the previous year, and the team felt it best to take the next step and organize an official squad that could actively participate during home games. The intention of the crew was to "enhance the overall fan experience by bringing additional energy and enthusiasm to each home game."

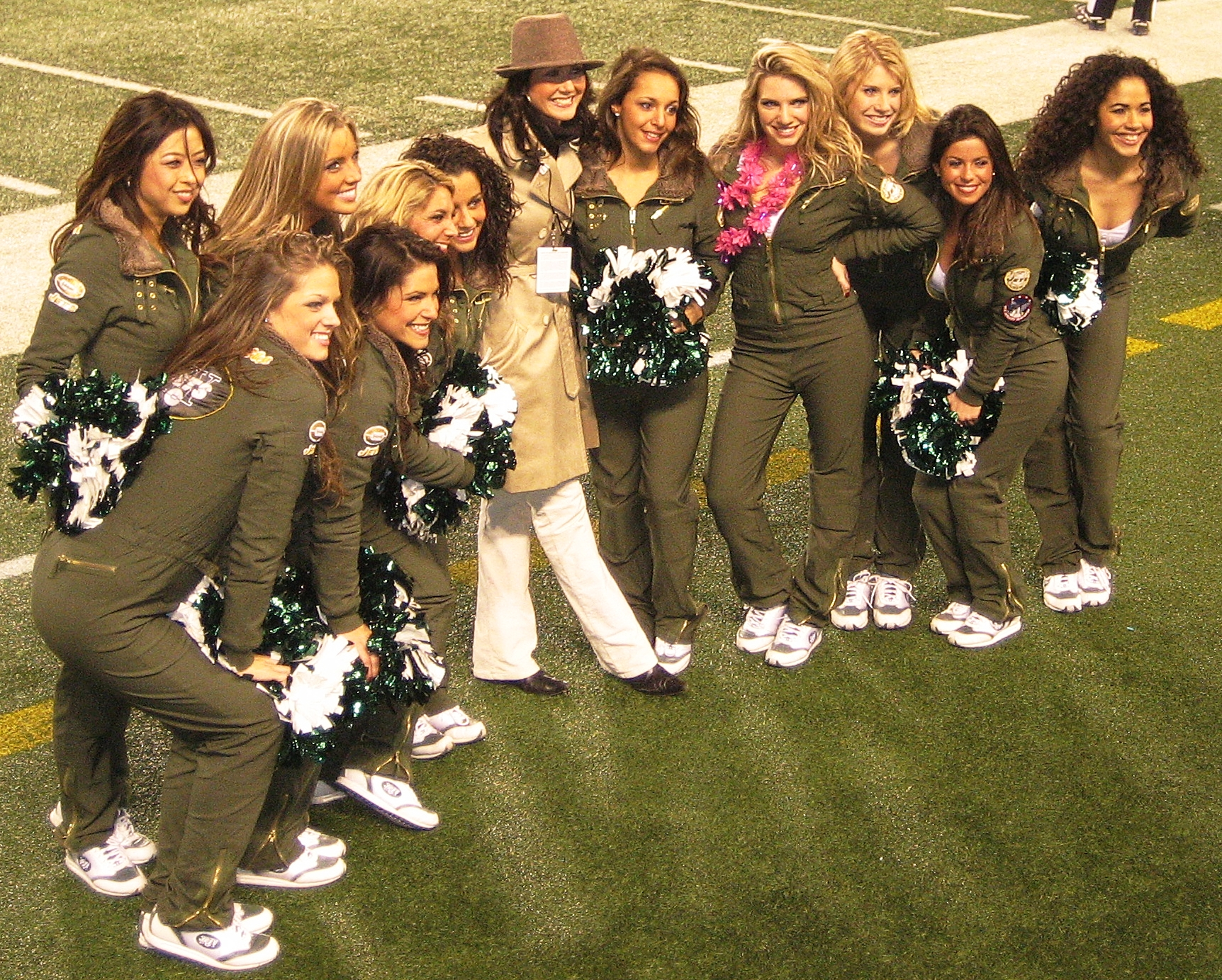
Jets Flight Crew cheerleaders, with Jets Flight Crew Director Denise Garvey, during a 2008 game against the Miami Dolphins

Denise Garvey, a former Knicks City Dancer and Cowboys cheerleader, was brought in to coordinate the squad. Given her expertise and experience in performance and dance, Garvey, with the support of the organization, held closed auditions, inviting 46 young women to try out for the squad. Of the 46, ten were chosen to become the first members of the Jets Flight Crew. The organization continued to stress that the squad was not cheerleaders but rather a unique flag carrier/dance team.

Following their inaugural season, the Flight Crew held open auditions for the first time in 2008, increasing the number of members from 10 to 22, as the squad had been well received among the fans in 2007. The Jets announced their partnership with Marc Eckō, founder of Eckō Unltd., who agreed to design the Flight Crew's 2008 uniforms.

The Flight Crew was expanded from 22 to 30 members in 2009. In 2010, the Jets, again, increased the size of the crew to as many as 40 members with Garvey noting that "We want to be the biggest presence we can be in the new stadium."

==== Calendar ====
In 2009, a Flight Crew swimsuit calendar was introduced, a testament to the squad's growing importance within the organization and in the community. The 2010 calendar featured members of the 2009 squad on beaches in New York and New Jersey while Linda W. served as the cover model. The following year, shooting for the 2011 calendar took place in Aruba.

== Junior Program ==
=== Jets Junior Flight Crew ===
The organization introduced the Jets Junior Flight Crew in 2010, a junior program that offers children the opportunity to train with the Flight Crew while improving their "talent and abilities in a non-competitive environment."

== See also ==
- National Football League Cheerleading
