= Charlotte Honey Bees =

Cheerleading squad for the Charlotte Hornets

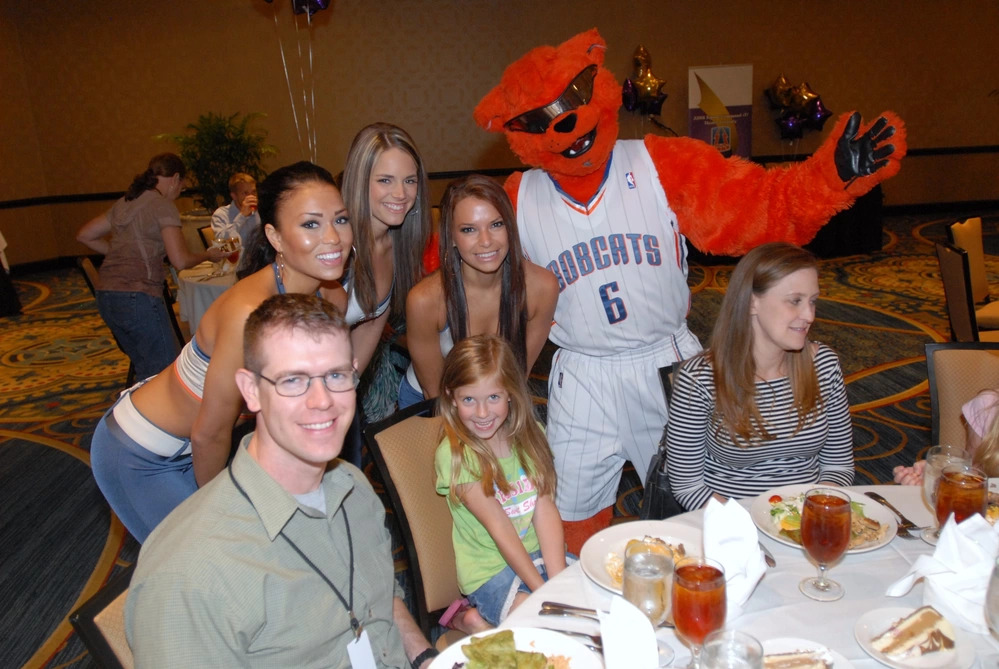
- Charlotte Lady Cats with fans in 2009
- Established: 1988
- Affiliations: Charlotte Hornets
- Formerly called: HoneyBees (1988–2002); Lady Cats (2002–2014); Honey Bees (2014–present)

Charlotte Honey Bees are a National Basketball Association Cheerleading squad that performs at Charlotte Hornets games in the Spectrum Center in Charlotte, North Carolina. The HoneyBees were dancers for the Charlotte Hornets from 1988 until 2002, when they became the Charlotte Lady Cats while the NBA basketball team was named the Charlotte Bobcats. In 2014, the cheerleading squad's name changed back to the Honey Bees after the Charlotte Bobcats went back to the Hornets name.
