= Pelle Pelle =

American leather jacket brand

- Website type: Private
- Founded: 1978
- Headquarters: Detroit, Michigan, United States
- Key people: Marc Buchanan (founder)
- Industry: Fashion
- Products: Apparel and accessories

Pelle Pelle is an urban fashion brand designed by Marc Buchanan. Buchanan began in the leather business in 1971 through a company he started with a friend called Gandalf & Co. selling leather jackets to finance his education at the Cranbrook Academy of Art. Pelle Pelle was launched in 1978 and started as a leather outerwear company. Pelle is based in Auburn Hills, Michigan. John Green is Pelle Pelle’s marketing director.

== History ==
Pelle Pelle gained popularity in the late 1970s and early 1980s in the hip-hop community. A revolution in fashion took the form of comfort in baggy pants and loose clothing for MCs and breakdancers. Designer Marc Buchanan specialized in creating brightly colored, highly embellished leather jackets, and branched out to sportswear and other outerwear. The brand name is the Italian word for leather hide or pelt. Rather than selling at large department stores, Buchanan chose small urban speciality stores in Chicago, Philadelphia and New York City.

In 2003, Pelle Pelle was fined $40,000 by the Federal Trade Commission for placing inaccurate labels on several types of men's pants and jackets. The clothes were labeled as machine washable; however, the garments were damaged when washed.

Pelle Pelle launched its handbag line in fall 2009.

== Clientele ==
Many celebrities have worn Pelle Pelle, such as 50 Cent, G Unit, Dr. Dre, Twista, Dipset, Cam’ron, The Game, Ludacris, Marques Colston, Usher, Dru Hill, Bobby Brown, Fat Joe, Mario, Chris Brown, and King 810 vocalist David Gun.

The company was commissioned by Furious Five and Grandmaster Flash to create a leather jacket for them to wear that was studded when they were inducted in the Rock and Roll Hall of Fame.

== In popular culture ==
Pelle Pelle is seen in Notorious, a 2009 motion picture that chronicles the life of rap artist Biggie Smalls.

Kanye West rapped about wearing Pelle Pelle on the Donda track “Pure Souls”.

== See also ==
- avirex
