= Charlotte Hornets =

National Basketball Association team in Charlotte, North Carolina

- 2026–27 Charlotte Hornets season
- Conference: Eastern
- Division: Southeast
- Founded: 1988
- History: Charlotte Hornets; 1988–2002, 2014–present Charlotte Bobcats; 2004–2014
- Arena: Spectrum Center
- Location: Charlotte, North Carolina
- Team colors: Teal, dark purple, gray, white
- Main sponsor: Judi Health
- President: Shelly Cayette-Weston
- General manager: Jeff Peterson
- Head coach: Charles Lee
- Ownership: Gabe Plotkin & Rick Schnall (majority); Eric Church, J. Cole, and Michael Jordan (minority)
- Affiliation: Greensboro Swarm
- Championships: 0
- Conference titles: 0
- Division titles: 0
- Retired numbers: 2 (13, 30)
- Website: nba.com/hornets
Association	Icon

The Charlotte Hornets are an American professional basketball team based in Charlotte, North Carolina. The Hornets compete in the National Basketball Association (NBA) as a member of the Southeast Division of the Eastern Conference. The team plays its home games at the Spectrum Center.

The Charlotte Hornets franchise was established in 1988 as an expansion team owned by George Shinn. In 2002, Shinn moved the franchise to New Orleans, where they began play as the New Orleans Hornets, later rebranding as the Pelicans in 2013.

The team would return as an expansion team, known as the Charlotte Bobcats, in the 2004–05 NBA season. On June 15, 2006, Michael Jordan, a former NBA player and member of the Naismith Basketball Hall of Fame, acquired a minority stake in the franchise and became its managing member of basketball operations. On February 17, 2010, an ownership group led by Jordan purchased a majority share of the franchise. In 2013, following the rebranding of the New Orleans Hornets to the Pelicans, the Bobcats announced they would begin playing as the Charlotte Hornets in the 2014–15 season, along with reclaiming the history and official records of the original Charlotte Hornets, statistically making the Hornets one continuous NBA team.

In August 2023, Jordan sold his majority stake in the Hornets to a group of investors led by Gabe Plotkin and Rick Schnall. He retained a minority share in the ownership of the team.

As of 2026, the Hornets are the only NBA franchise to have never won a division title, and one of two franchises alongside the New Orleans Pelicans to have never advanced to the conference finals.

== History ==
=== 1985–1988: Creation of the Hornets ===
In 1985, the NBA was planning to expand by three teams by the 1988–89 season, later revised to include a fourth expansion team. George Shinn, an entrepreneur from Kannapolis, wanted to bring an NBA team to the Charlotte area, and he assembled a group of prominent local businessmen to head the prospective franchise. The Charlotte area had long been a hotbed for college basketball. Charlotte was also one of the fastest-growing cities in the United States, and was previously one of three in-state homes to the American Basketball Association's (ABA) Carolina Cougars from 1969 to 1974.

Despite doubt from critics, Shinn's ace in the hole was the Charlotte Coliseum, a state-of-the-art arena that would seat almost 24,000 spectators, the largest basketball-specific arena ever to serve as a full-time home for an NBA team. On April 5, 1987, then-NBA Commissioner David Stern called Shinn to tell him his group had been awarded the 24th NBA franchise, to begin play in 1988. Franchises were also granted to Miami, Minneapolis–Saint Paul, and Orlando.

Originally, the new team was going to be called the Charlotte Spirit, but a name-the-team contest yielded "Hornets" as the winning choice. The name originates from British General Cornwallis, who allegedly described the city as "a hornet's nest of rebellion" following the Battle of Charlotte in 1780, though it was first attested in 1819. The team received further attention when it chose teal as its primary color, setting off a sports fashion craze in the late 1980s and early 1990s. The team's uniforms, designed by international designer and North Carolina native Alexander Julian, featured a first for NBA uniforms: pin stripes. Similar designs by other teams followed, as they became a hit.

Shinn hired Carl Scheer as the team's first President and General Manager. Scheer preferred a roster of veteran players, hoping to put together a competitive team as soon as possible. Former college coach and veteran NBA assistant Dick Harter was hired as the team's first head coach. In 1988, the Hornets and the Miami Heat were part of the 1988 NBA expansion draft. Unlike many expansion franchises that invest in the future with a team composed entirely of young players, Charlotte stocked its inaugural roster with several veterans in hopes of putting a competitive lineup on the court right away. The team also had three draft picks at the 1988 NBA draft.

=== 1988–1992: Early seasons ===
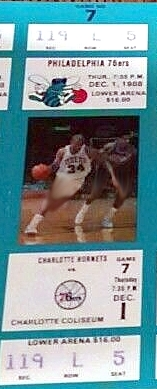
Season tickets for the Hornets' inaugural season.

The Hornets' first NBA game took place on November 4, 1988 at the Charlotte Coliseum, where they lost 133–93 to the Cleveland Cavaliers. Four days later, the team notched its first-ever victory over the Los Angeles Clippers, 117–105. On December 23, 1988, the Hornets beat Michael Jordan and the Chicago Bulls 103–101 in Jordan's first return to North Carolina as a professional. The Hornets finished their inaugural season with a record of 20–62. Scheer left prior to the 1989–90 season.

Despite initial concerns that the Coliseum was too big, the Hornets were a runaway hit, leading the NBA in attendance, a feat they would achieve seven more times in Charlotte. Eventually, the Hornets would sell out 364 consecutive games.

The Hornets' second season was a struggle from start to finish. Members of the team rebelled against Dick Harter's defense-oriented style, and he was replaced mid-season by assistant Gene Littles following an 8–32 start. Despite the change, the team continued to struggle, finishing the season with a disappointing 19–63 record.

The team showed improvement during the following season. They won eight of their first fifteen games, including a 120–105 victory over the Washington Bullets. However, the team went cold, losing their next eleven games. The Hornets, who hosted the 1991 NBA All-Star Game, finished with a 26–56 record. Despite the team's seven-game improvement over the previous season, Gene Littles was fired at the end of the season and replaced by general manager Allan Bristow.

With the first pick in the 1991 NBA draft, the Hornets drafted power forward Larry Johnson from the University of Nevada, Las Vegas. Johnson had an impact season, finishing among the league leaders in points and rebounds, and winning the 1992 NBA Rookie of the Year Award. Additionally, Guard Kendall Gill led the club in scoring, averaging over 20 points per game. The team stayed in contention for a playoff spot until March, but finished the year with a 31–51 record.

=== 1992–1995: The Larry Johnson/Alonzo Mourning era ===
The Hornets were in the lottery again in 1992 and won the second overall pick in the draft, using it to select Georgetown center Alonzo Mourning. Charlotte now had two 20–10 threats in Johnson and Mourning, who with Kendall Gill, formed perhaps the league's top young trio. The team finished their fifth season at 44–38, their first-ever winning record and good enough for the first playoff berth in franchise history. Finishing fifth in the Eastern Conference, the Hornets upset the Boston Celtics in the first round, with Mourning winning the series with a 20-footer in game four. However, the Hornets lacked the experience and depth to defeat the New York Knicks, falling in five games in the second round.

The Hornets finished the 1993–94 season with a 41–41 record, narrowly missing the playoffs. Despite injuries to both Johnson and Mourning, the two led the team in points-per-game.

In the 1994–95 season, the Hornets finished with a 50–32 record, returning to the playoffs. Johnson and Mourning again led the team in points-per-game, while also leading the club in rebounding. However, Charlotte was bounced from the playoffs in the first round, falling to the Chicago Bulls in four games. Following the season, the Hornets traded Mourning to the Miami Heat for forward Glen Rice, center Matt Geiger, and guard Khalid Reeves.

=== 1995–1998: The Glen Rice era ===
Glen Rice would make an immediate impact after joining the Hornets, leading the team in scoring and points-per-game during the 1995–96 season. While Rice and Johnson provided high-powered scoring, Geiger tied with Johnson for the team lead in rebounds, and All-Star guard Kenny Anderson ran the point for the injured Muggsy Bogues. The Hornets were competitive but failed to qualify for the playoffs, again finishing with a 41–41 record. Allan Bristow resigned at the end of the season, and was replaced by Dave Cowens.

The 1996 off-season was again marked by vast changes: Anderson declined to re-sign, Johnson was shipped to the Knicks for power forward Anthony Mason, and the team made a trade on draft day 1996, acquiring center Vlade Divac from the Los Angeles Lakers in exchange for the rights to rookie and future Hall of Famer Kobe Bryant, whom the Hornets picked 13th overall. The new-look Hornets were successful, with Divac and Geiger providing the center combination, Mason averaging a double-double, Bogues back at the point, and Rice having the finest season of his career. The team achieved the best season in its history at the time, finishing 54–28, and making it back to the playoffs. Despite the success during the regular season, the Hornets went down rather meekly to the Knicks in three games.

The 1997–98 season was also successful. Muggsy Bogues was traded two games into the season, and the team picked up point guard David Wesley and shooting guard Bobby Phills. With Wesley, Phills, Rice, Mason, and Divac, the Hornets romped through the regular season, finishing with a 51–31 record. The Hornets made it to back-to-back playoffs for the first time in franchise history, advancing to the second round, only to be stopped by the Bulls.

=== 1998–2002: Final years of original personnel ===
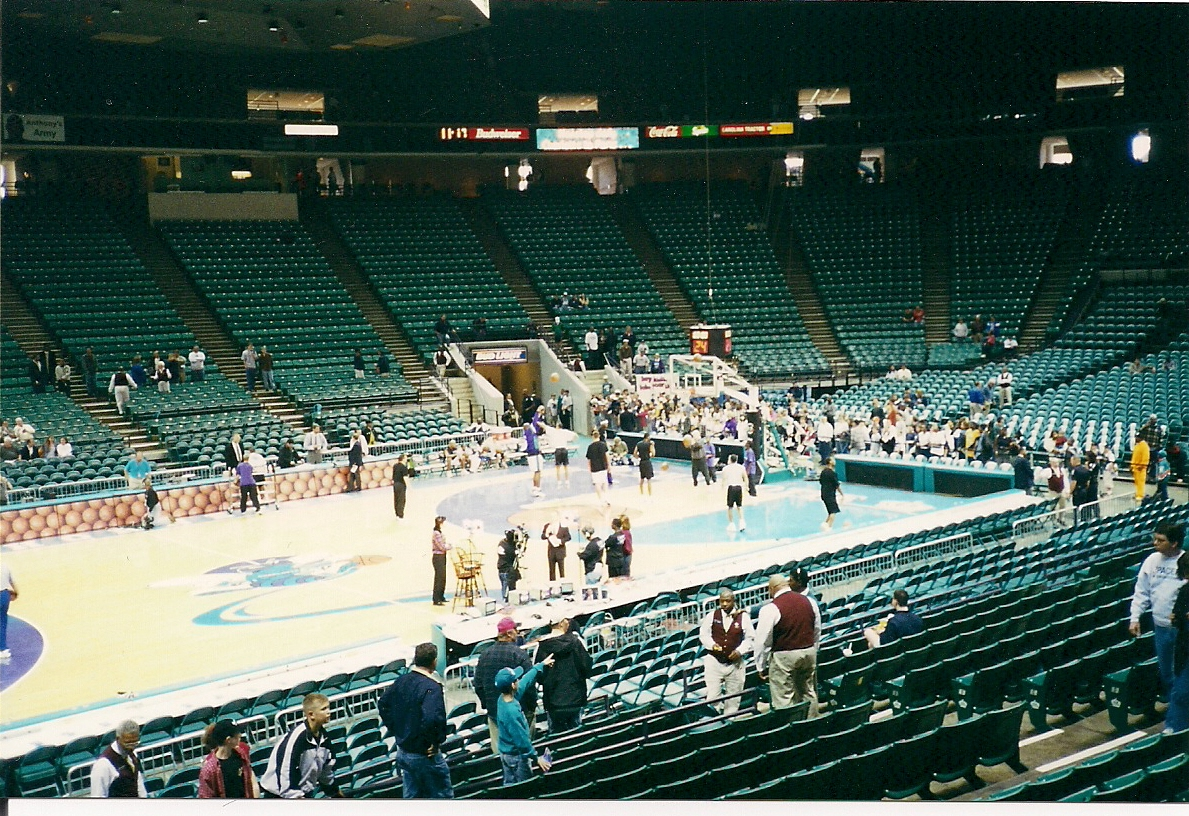
Players warming up prior to an April 2000 game between the Hornets and the Indiana Pacers at the Charlotte Coliseum

The 1998–99 season was shortened. The season did not start until February, as the lockout shortened the regular season to only 50 games. Additionally, Glen Rice was traded to the Lakers for Eddie Jones and Elden Campbell, and Dave Cowens resigned midway through the season. He was replaced by former Celtics teammate Paul Silas, who became the team's fifth head coach. The team finished with a 26–24 record, but failed to qualify for the playoffs.

The next three seasons (1999–2000, 2000–01 and 2001–02) saw the Hornets in the playoffs each year, reaching the conference semifinals twice. Before the Hornets were eliminated from the 2002 playoffs, the NBA approved a deal for the team to move to New Orleans for the 2002–03 season. The move came mainly because attendance tailed off dramatically, reportedly due to Shinn's declining popularity in the city.

=== 2004–2014: Charlotte Bobcats ===
Shortly after the relocation of the team to New Orleans, as part of a deal with the city of Charlotte, as well as to avoid a Cleveland Browns–like lawsuit, the NBA promised that Charlotte would get a new expansion franchise. Consequently, the NBA opened itself to the possibility of adding a replacement team in Charlotte for the 2004–05 season, provided that an arena deal could be reached. Several ownership groups, including one led by former Boston Celtics star Larry Bird, made bids for the franchise. On December 18, 2002, a group led by BET founder Robert L. Johnson was awarded the franchise, allowing him to become the first African American majority owner in U.S. major professional sports since the Negro leagues. The franchise with Johnson as its owner was approved by the NBA Board of Governors on January 10, 2003. Hip-hop artist Nelly became a notable co-owner. The owners paid a $300 million expansion fee to enter the league.

In June 2003, the team name was officially announced as the Bobcats. The Charlotte Regional Sports Commission aided the naming process with a "Help Name The Team" effort that drew over 1,250 suggestions, with 'Flight' being the winner. However, it was discarded by Johnson and the team involved in creating the team's identity, being considered abstract and reminiscent of the then-current Iraq War aerial strikes. Given Charlotte was already home to a cat-named team, the Carolina Panthers of the National Football League, designer Chris Weiller made sure to create a logo that would not be similar to the Panthers logo. It has also been speculated that Johnson chose the name "Bobcats" in reference to his own name.

The Bobcats hired Bernie Bickerstaff as the first head coach and general manager in franchise history. A new arena to host the Bobcats in uptown Charlotte began construction in July 2003. The team would play its home games at the Coliseum until the new building was ready.

==== 2004–2010: Return to Charlotte ====
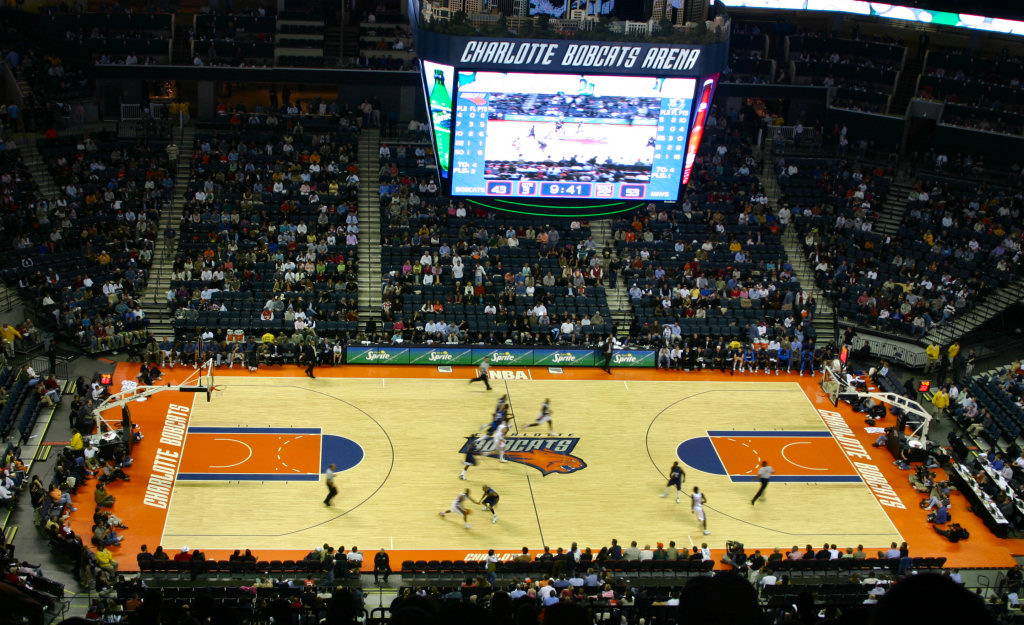
The Bobcats versus the Dallas Mavericks on November 11, 2005.

The Bobcats held their expansion draft on June 22, 2004, picking up young players such as Gerald Wallace, Primož Brezec, and Jason Kapono. Shortly after, they traded with the Los Angeles Clippers to acquire the second pick in the 2004 NBA draft, which they used to select center Emeka Okafor from Connecticut. The Bobcats' inaugural game, and the first of their 2004–05 season took place on November 4 at the Charlotte Coliseum, and was a 103–96 loss to the Washington Wizards. Two days later, they won their first game in franchise history over the Orlando Magic, 111–100. On December 14, the Bobcats beat the New Orleans Hornets in overtime in the team's first trip to Charlotte since relocating. The Bobcats finished their inaugural season 18–64. Emeka Okafor, however, won the 2004–05 NBA Rookie of the Year Award.

In the 2005 NBA draft, the Bobcats drafted Raymond Felton and Sean May from North Carolina. In their second season, the Bobcats opened Charlotte Bobcats Arena with an overtime victory over the Celtics. Despite struggling for most of the year, they managed to close out the season with four straight wins to finish with a record of 26–56, an eight-game improvement from the previous season. After the season, the Bobcats announced that NBA legend and North Carolina native Michael Jordan had bought a minority stake in the team. As part of the deal, he became head of basketball operations, though Bickerstaff remained general manager.

The Bobcats showed some improvement during the 2006–07 season, posting a playoff-hopeful record of 22–33 late in February 2007. However, the team went through an eight-game losing streak and dropped their record to 22–41 by early March 2007. Following the slump, Jordan announced that Bickerstaff would not return to coach the following season, but would finish coaching the remainder of the 2006–07 season. The Bobcats won 11 of their last 19 games of Bickerstaff's tenure to finish their third season 33–49. On June 3, 2007, Charlotte Coliseum was demolished, marking a bitter end to the original Hornets era as it was the home of Charlotte's original NBA franchise. The arena was only 19 years old, owned by the city of Charlotte, but was already considered outdated because of a lack of luxury boxes and suites. The arena was designed for college basketball as part of Charlotte's push to maintain their presence in the ACC basketball tournament rotation.

Front office and coaching were key focuses for the Bobcats during the 2007 off-season. Rod Higgins was hired as general manager, and Sam Vincent was hired as the second head coach in franchise history. In the 2007 NBA draft, Brandan Wright was selected by the Bobcats with the eighth pick; he was subsequently traded to Golden State for Jason Richardson. The Bobcats were unable to capitalize on off-season moves, finishing the 2007–08 season with a 32–50 record. The team struggled amid rumors of players clashing with the coach. After a year, during which he struggled with personnel decisions, Sam Vincent was fired in April 2008.

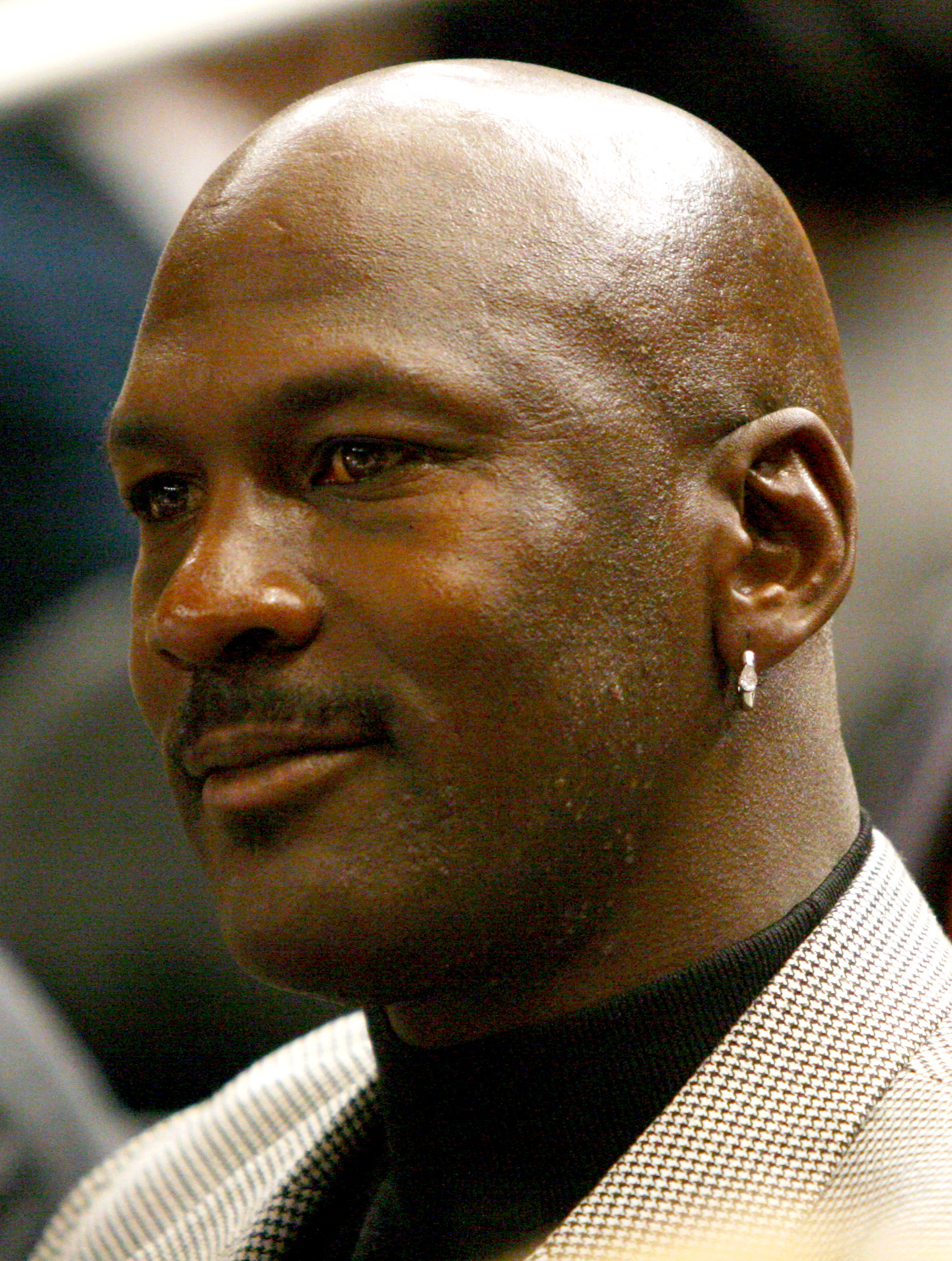
Michael Jordan acquired the Bobcats in 2010.

On April 29, 2008, the Bobcats reached an agreement to hire Basketball Hall of Famer Larry Brown as the third head coach in franchise history. In the 2008 NBA draft, the Bobcats selected D. J. Augustin from Texas ninth overall. On December 10, 2008, a little over a month into the season, the Bobcats obtained Boris Diaw and Raja Bell in a trade with Phoenix. The trade turned out to be successful as the team came close to reaching the franchise's first playoff berth, but finished four games out of eighth place with a record of 35–47. Following the season, majority owner Bob Johnson announced he was putting the team up for sale.

During the off-season, the team picked Gerald Henderson from Duke 12th overall in the 2009 NBA draft. The Bobcats traded Emeka Okafor for New Orleans Hornets' center Tyson Chandler, and through more trades acquired Stephen Jackson and Acie Law from the Golden State Warriors. On February 27, 2010, it was announced that Johnson had decided to sell the team to Jordan, allowing Jordan to become the first former NBA player to become majority owner of a franchise.

On April 9, 2010, the Bobcats clinched their first playoff berth since 2002 with a 104–103 road win over the New Orleans Hornets, finishing the 2009–10 season with an overall record of 44–38, their first-ever winning season. Gerald Wallace was a huge factor in the playoff run as he became the Bobcats' first and only NBA All-Star. However, the Bobcats were swept by the Orlando Magic in four games.

==== 2010–2014: Final years of the Bobcats ====
Despite the departures of Raymond Felton and Tyson Chandler, the Bobcats hoped to make the playoffs for a second straight season. Following a dismal 9–19 start, Jordan announced that Larry Brown had stepped down as head coach. Paul Silas was hired as their new head coach the same day. The Bobcats sent Wallace to the Portland Trail Blazers and received two first-round draft picks, Joel Przybilla, Sean Marks, and Dante Cunningham, also acquiring D. J. White and Morris Peterson in a trade with the Thunder. Going down the stretch, injuries to both Stephen Jackson and Tyrus Thomas derailed any chances of Charlotte trying to catch the Indiana Pacers for the eighth spot in the east. In the end, the Bobcats finished the season with a 34–48 record overall, finishing 25–29 under Silas.

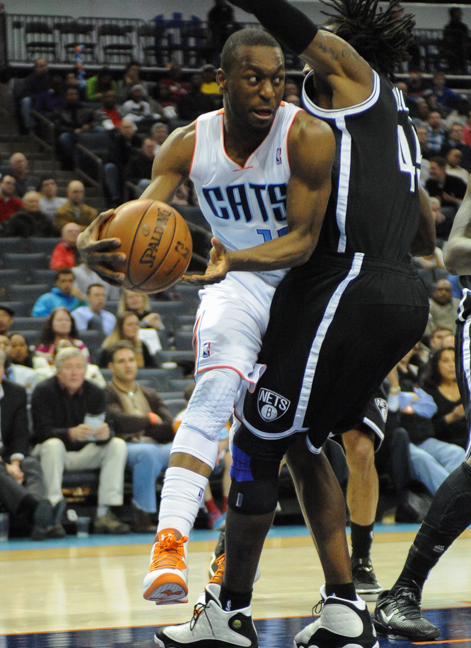
The Bobcats selected Kemba Walker as the 9th overall pick in the 2011 NBA draft.

On June 13, 2011, the Bobcats made some changes to their front office by hiring former Trail Blazers general manager Rich Cho to the same position and promoting Rod Higgins to President of Basketball Operations. During the 2011 NBA draft the Bobcats sent Jackson, Shaun Livingston, and the 19th pick to Milwaukee and received Corey Maggette and the 7th pick in return. The Bobcats used that pick to draft Bismack Biyombo and with their 9th pick drafted Connecticut's Kemba Walker, the NCAA basketball tournament Most Outstanding Player.

In the lockout-shortened 2011–12 season, Charlotte lost often, including their last 23 games. During their season finale against the New York Knicks, the Bobcats recorded yet another loss as their win percentage dropped to .106, setting a new record for the worst season ever by an NBA team (as this season was shortened by the lockout, the 1972–73 Philadelphia 76ers still hold the record for most losses in a season with 73). Overall, the team's record was 7–59. On April 30, 2012, the Bobcats announced that Silas would not return as head coach. St. John's assistant Mike Dunlap was named as his successor.

Despite finishing the season with the worst record in NBA history, the Bobcats received the second overall pick. With the second pick in the 2012 NBA draft, the Bobcats selected Michael Kidd-Gilchrist and selected Jeffery Taylor with the 31st pick. They also added Ben Gordon, Ramon Sessions and Brendan Haywood in free agency. The Bobcats won their first game against the Pacers, snapping their 23-game losing streak. The team seemed to rebound with a 7–5 start to the season. However, they promptly went on an 18-game losing streak from which they never recovered, snapping the streak with a win at Chicago. Charlotte finished 21–61, the second-worst record in the league. Dunlap was fired on April 23, reportedly because the players were turned off by his heavy-handed coaching style. He would be replaced by former Los Angeles Lakers assistant head coach Steve Clifford.

During the 2013 NBA draft, the Bobcats selected power forward/center Cody Zeller 4th overall. The Bobcats would also obtain former Utah Jazz center Al Jefferson in free agency. In February 2014, the team received Gary Neal and Luke Ridnour in a trade with the Bucks. The new players and coaching staff worked as the Bobcats clinched a playoff berth for the second time in franchise history by beating Cleveland on the road. Charlotte finished the regular season 43–39. However, the Bobcats were swept in four games by defending champion Miami in the first round.

=== 2014–2019: Rise of Kemba Walker ===
==== Return of the Hornets ====
On May 21, 2013, Jordan officially announced the organization had submitted an application to change the name of the franchise to the Charlotte Hornets for the 2014–15 NBA season, pending a majority vote for approval by the NBA Board of Governors at a meeting in Las Vegas on July 18, 2013. The NBA announced, on July 18, 2013, that it had unanimously approved the rebranding, which would begin upon the conclusion of the 2013–14 season.

The Bobcats announced on November 22, they would adopt a modified version of the original Hornets' teal-purple-white color palette, with black, gray and Carolina blue as accents. The team officially unveiled its future logo and identity scheme during halftime of their December 21 game against the Jazz. The team also started the "Buzz City" campaign to hype up the Hornets return. On January 16, 2014, the Bobcats revealed new Hornets shirts, hats and gear.

On May 20, 2014, the Bobcats officially became the second incarnation of the Charlotte Hornets. At a press conference regarding the change, team officials also announced that as part of a deal with the NBA and the renamed New Orleans Pelicans, Charlotte acquired the history and records of the 1988–2002 Hornets (in a move similar to that of the National Football League's Cleveland Browns return to the league in 1999), while all of the Hornets' records during their time in New Orleans from 2002 to 2013 remained with the Pelicans. The Hornets are now retconned as having suspended operations from 2002 to 2004, while the Pelicans are considered a 2002 expansion team. Charlotte had already been using past footage of the original Hornets as part of the "Buzz City" campaign.

==== 2014–2019: Playoffs and struggles ====
In the 2014 NBA draft, the Hornets had the 9th overall pick from an earlier trade with the Detroit Pistons, which they used to select Noah Vonleh from Indiana. In the same draft they acquired UConn Husky Shabazz Napier, Dwight Powell from Stanford, and Semaj Christon from Xavier in the second round. They later traded Napier to the Heat for P. J. Hairston (formerly from UNC), the rights to the 55th pick, Miami's 2019 second-round pick and cash considerations. The team also picked up Scotty Hopson (whom they would trade to New Orleans) and cash considerations in free agency.

During their first year of free agency as the Hornets, the team signed former Pacers shooting guard Lance Stephenson. The Hornets also signed former Jazz and Atlanta Hawks forward Marvin Williams to a two-year deal. A mostly difficult year led to a 33–49 record overall and a 4th-place finish in the division. Stephenson was traded to the Los Angeles Clippers for Spencer Hawes and Matt Barnes who was later traded to the Memphis Grizzlies for Courtney Lee.

The following year, the team improved to 48–34 overall, following the acquisition of players such as Nicolas Batum, Jeremy Lamb, and Jeremy Lin. It was the best season in franchise history since the original Hornets era. Charlotte returned to the playoffs, where they lost to the Heat in seven games in the first round. Along the way, they defeated the Heat twice at Time Warner Cable Arena, the franchise's first playoff wins since the original Hornets era.

In the off-season, Jeremy Lin would go to sign with the Brooklyn Nets, Al Jefferson to the Indiana Pacers, and Courtney Lee to the New York Knicks, but the Hornets were able to re-sign Nicolas Batum and Marvin Williams, as well as bring in former All-star Roy Hibbert, Marco Belinelli and Ramon Sessions for a second stint. Hibbert would be traded mid-season to the Milwaukee Bucks with Spencer Hawes for center Miles Plumlee. Kemba Walker was named an Eastern Conference All-star as a reserve, the first all-star game of his career. The Hornets would finish the season with a 36–46 record, missing out on the playoffs.

The Hornets had a successful 2017 off-season. They shipped Plumlee and Belinelli and the 41st pick in the 2017 NBA draft to the Atlanta Hawks for former All-star Dwight Howard and the 31st pick in the 2017 draft. The trade reunited Howard with head coach Steve Clifford, both of whom worked together during Howard's time in Orlando and Los Angeles. In the draft, Charlotte selected Malik Monk with the 11th overall pick, as well as Frank Jackson with the 31st pick. They then sent Jackson to New Orleans for cash considerations and swing-man Dwayne Bacon who was drafted 40th overall. Sessions signed with the New York Knicks, and, to replace the backup guard, they brought in former rookie of the year Michael Carter-Williams from the Chicago Bulls.

In the 2017–18 season Kemba Walker was selected for his second NBA All-Star appearance and passed Dell Curry for most three-pointers and the all-time leading scorer. At the end of the 2017–18 season, the Hornets did not renew the contract of general manager Rich Cho. In April 2018, Mitch Kupchak was named as the new president of basketball operations and general manager. On April 13, 2018, the Hornets fired head coach Steve Clifford after five seasons, who coached the team to a 196–214 record total, and named James Borrego as his replacement on May 10.

On July 23, 2018, Tony Parker, who spent the previous 17 years of his career with the San Antonio Spurs, signed with the Hornets. In January 2019 Kemba Walker was named an All-Star Game starter for the Eastern Conference, his first starting role in an All-Star Game, and matched only Glen Rice for his third All-Star Game appearance in his Hornets career. During the 2018–19 season, Charlotte finished the season with a 39–43 record finishing 2nd in the division and 9th in the Eastern Conference.

On June 20, 2019, the Hornets selected P. J. Washington with the twelfth overall pick in the 2019 NBA draft.

On July 6, 2019, Kemba Walker joined the Boston Celtics through a sign-and-trade deal with the Hornets.

=== 2020–2026: The LaMelo Ball era ===
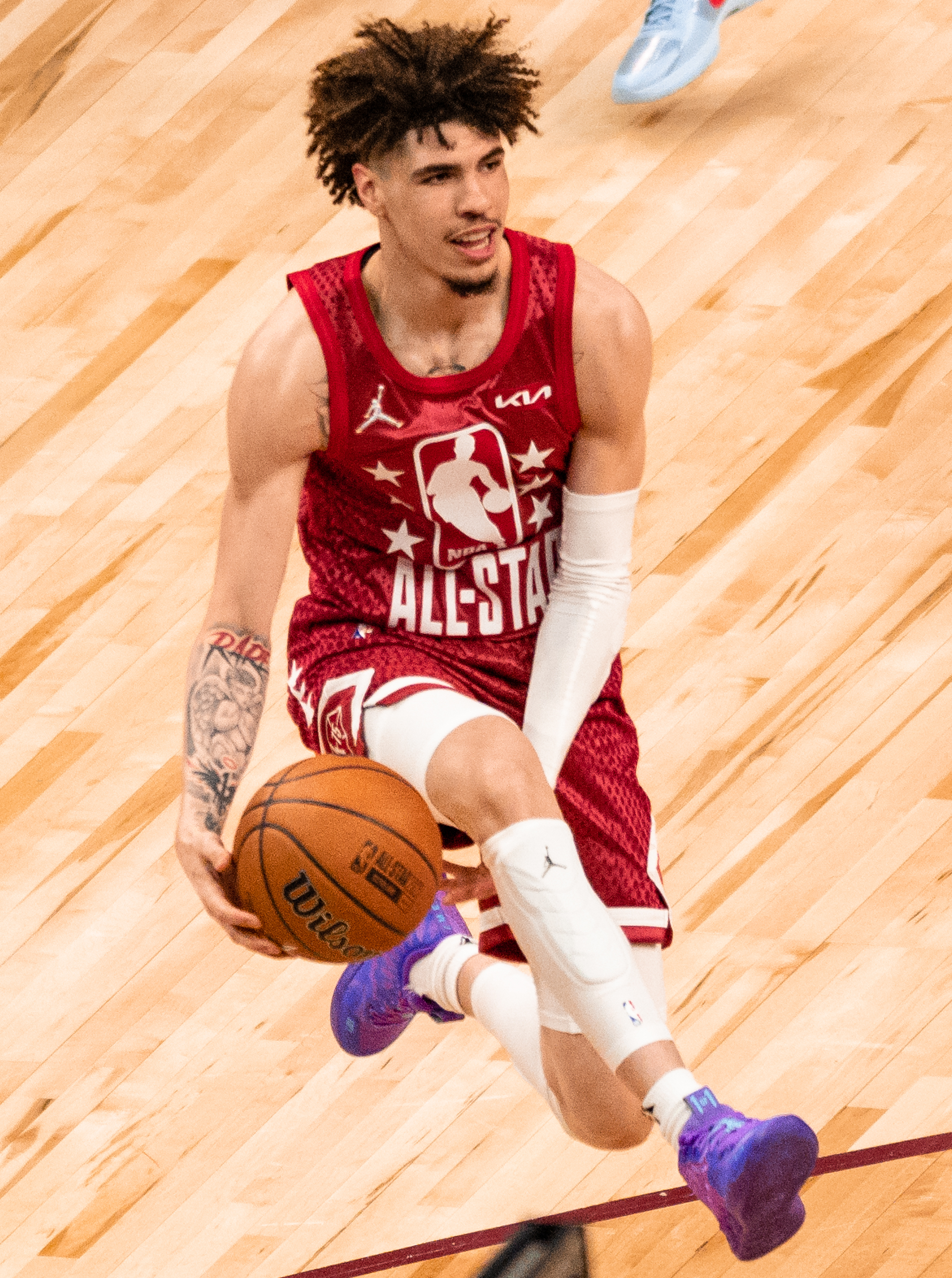
The Hornets selected LaMelo Ball as the 3rd overall pick in the 2020 NBA draft.

On November 18, 2020, the Hornets selected LaMelo Ball with the third overall pick. The Hornets also drafted Vernon Carey Jr. and Grant Riller in the second round of the 2020 NBA draft. On November 29, 2020, the Hornets would acquire Gordon Hayward in a sign-and-trade deal with the Boston Celtics. The Hornets finished the 2020–21 season 10th in the East with a 33–39 overall record. On June 16, 2021, Ball was named 2020–21 NBA Rookie of the Year, becoming the third player in franchise history to win the award.

On February 7, 2022, Ball was named to his first NBA All-Star Game as an injury replacement for Kevin Durant. The Hornets would clinch a spot in the play-in tournament for the second consecutive time although losing to fellow Southeast division foe the Atlanta Hawks 132–103. On April 22, 2022, the Hornets fired head coach James Borrego after four seasons with the team. The team finished the 2021–2022 season with a 43–39 overall record.

On June 24, 2022, the Hornets named Steve Clifford as new head coach marking his second stint as the team's head coach. During the off-season, notable additions included drafting Duke center Mark Williams with the 15th pick of the 2022 NBA draft and the free agent signing of point guard and North Carolina native Dennis Smith Jr.

During the 2022–23 NBA season, the Hornets endured injuries to a majority of the roster, leading to a poor season which ended with a 27–55 record, the fourth worst in the league. Lamelo Ball only played 36 games. However, Mark Williams proved his immense potential.

Courtesy of their poor finish, the Hornets won the second overall pick which they used to select Brandon Miller in the 2023 NBA draft.

On June 16, 2023, Jordan announced he was selling his majority stake in the team to a group led by Gabe Plotkin and Rick Schnall. The transaction, sold at $3 billion, was approved by the NBA on July 23, 2023.

On April 3, 2024 Steve Clifford announced he would step into an advisor role following a 21–61 season. He finished as the Hornets all time win leader. On May 9, 2024, Celtics assistant Charles Lee was announced as his successor, receiving a 4-year deal.

Brandon Miller had a successful rookie season, averaging 17 points per game and finishing third in Rookie of the Year voting despite a strong rookie class. Lamelo Ball once again struggled with injury, only playing 22 games. Mark Williams also only played 19 games on the season. Terry Rozier was dealt to Miami at the trade deadline for a pick and veteran guard Kyle Lowry. Another addition was Grant Williams from the Dallas Mavericks, acquired in a trade for PJ Washington. Gordon Hayward was also dealt away. After the season, former player Kemba Walker was hired to be a player enhancement coach.

== Rivalries ==
=== Miami Heat ===
The Miami Heat and Charlotte Hornets share a historic connection as "expansion sisters," both entering the NBA in 1988. While Miami has historically dominated with a 90-55 overall record (including playoffs) and three championships, the rivalry is defined by intense Southeast Division battles and several key playoff clashes.

=== Detroit Pistons ===
The rivalry between the Detroit Pistons and Charlotte Hornets, which spans from the late 1980s to the 2020s, has evolved from early competitive matchups to a modern, intense rivalry defined by physical play, on-court brawls, and crucial rebuilding-era battles. While the teams have not historically met in major playoff series, their matchups have often carried significant emotional weight and, recently, high-stakes intensity.

On February 9, 2026, on-court brawl ignited a fierce rivalry between the Detroit Pistons and Charlotte Hornets, resulting in four ejections (Jalen Duren, Isaiah Stewart, Miles Bridges, Moussa Diabate) and a 110-104 Pistons win. The fight, featuring punches and a bench-clearing incident, escalated tension, with Stewart specifically charging at Bridges.

== Logos and uniforms ==
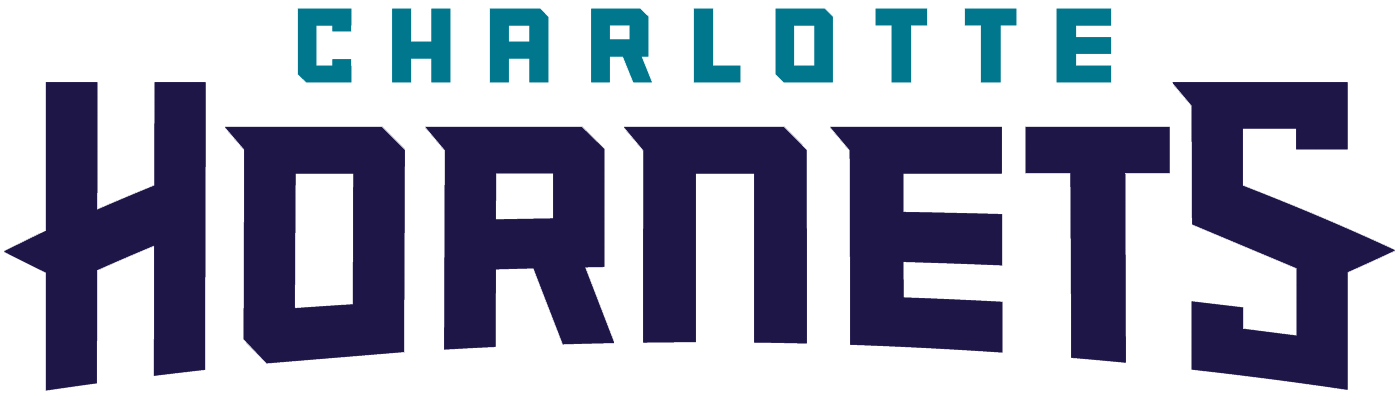
Charlotte Hornets wordmark logo

=== Logos ===
The Hornets' logo was a teal and purple anthropomorphic hornet wearing white shoes and gloves dribbling an orange basketball. The words 'Charlotte Hornets' were in teal and curved across the top and bottom of the logo. An alternate logo, used only for the 1988–89 season, featured a large teal letter 'C', with 'Charlotte' in black letters curved upwards underneath. Inside the 'C' was a smaller white letter 'H' outlined in teal, with a black-colored hornet holding a basketball from birds-eye view placed in the center.

The Bobcats' primary logo from 2004 to 2012 consisted of a snarling orange bobcat facing to the right with the indented name 'Bobcats' above in silver on a blue background, with 'Charlotte' (also indented) appearing above it in the same blue color. A change to a less vibrant orange and blue, while retaining the same look, was made in 2007. Further color changes in 2012 made the bobcat gray, extended the blue background up to the 'Charlotte' name, which changed from blue to orange. A Carolina blue outline around the entire logo was also added. In 2007 the Bobcats unveiled a secondary logo, consisting of a snarling bobcat head facing forward with one side shaded orange, and the other blue. A silver basketball was placed behind the right of the head, all encased in an orange-blue-gray circle. During the 2012 rebranding, the colors were changed, with gray and Carolina blue replacing orange on the head and circle outline, respectively, and the basketball changing to orange. This logo would become prominent in the team's marketing and be featured at center court from 2007–08 until 2013–14.

Charlotte's second Hornets logo features a teal and purple forward-facing hornet with the words 'Charlotte Hornets' on its torso. Wings sprout up above the head on both left and right, with teal and purple details. The hornet's stinger is prominently featured; a basketball pattern is above the stinger. Gray fully outlines the logo. Among the team's different secondary logos includes a hornet facing to the side, its teal and purple body arched in a 'C' shape representing the city of Charlotte, and a modified version of the Hornets original logo (sans the basketball) as the official mascot logo.

=== Uniforms ===
==== Original Hornets ====
The original Hornets uniforms were designed by international designer and North Carolina native Alexander Julian. The team chose teal and purple as its primary colors and featured a first for NBA uniforms—pinstripes. While most teams feature team names on home jerseys and their home city on away jerseys, the Hornets' uniforms had "Charlotte" on both home and away jerseys. Home uniforms were white with pinstripes in teal, green, blue and purple, while the away jerseys were teal with pinstripes in white, green, blue and purple.

In 1994, the Hornets unveiled a purple alternate uniform, with pinstripes in white, green, blue and teal. Likewise, Hugo was featured in the beltline.

From 1997 to 2002, the Hornets made slight changes to their uniforms. Hugo was moved from the beltline to the left leg, while side stripes with pinstripes were added, in purple (away) and teal (home) colors. A tricolor featuring teal, purple and blue was featured on the beltline and the piping.

==== Bobcats ====
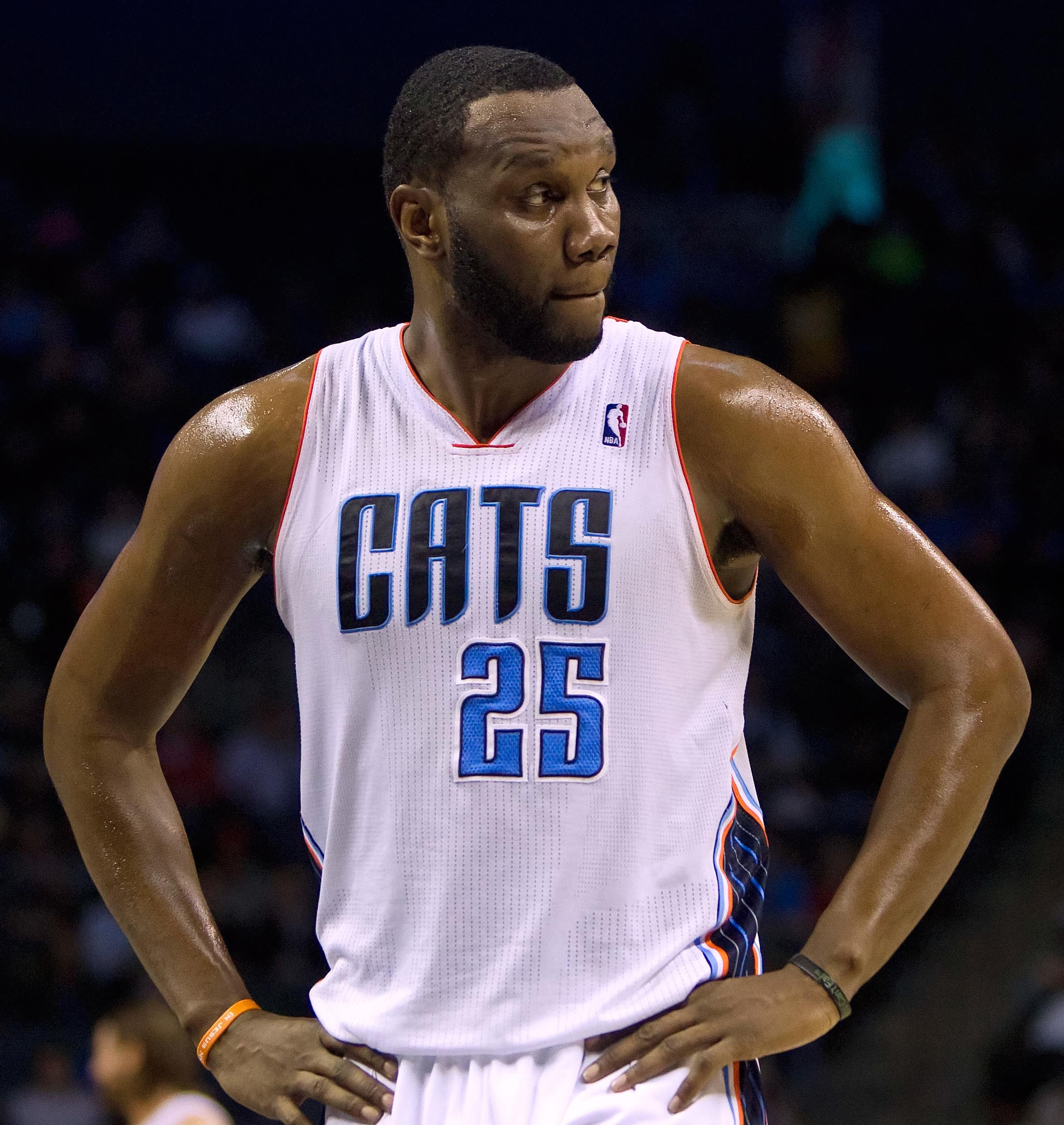
Bobcats uniform design from 2012 to 2014

The Bobcats' first home jerseys were white, reading "Bobcats" in orange with blue and black trimming. The primary away jersey was orange reading "Charlotte" in white with blue and black trimming. In the 2006 off-season, the Bobcats announced a new alternate away jersey which debuted during the 2006–07 season. The alternate jersey is blue, with the name "Bobcats" in white with black, orange and white trimming. Racing Day blue alternates (with an arched 'Charlotte', checkered flag side stripes, and centered numbers) were used to honor Charlotte's NASCAR fanbase.

For the 2009–10 season, the Bobcats sported redesigned uniforms, having a mixture of characteristics from both Hornets and Bobcats uniforms. The home uniforms were white and featured an arched "Bobcats" in blue with orange and white trim. Road uniforms were blue and featured an arched "Charlotte" in white with blue and orange trim. Both designs featured silver pinstripes, similar to what the Hornets wore. The NASCAR uniform was also updated to include the pinstripes. For the 2011–12 season, however, the Bobcats wore their home uniforms on NASCAR night, complete with a racing flag patch.

The Bobcats unveiled Hardwood Classics uniforms honoring the American Basketball Association (ABA)'s Carolina Cougars, which the team wore for select games in 2012.

The Bobcats unveiled new uniforms on June 19, 2012, their second and final change in five years. Overall, they featured less emphasis on orange. The white home uniforms sported the shorter nickname 'Cats' in navy and Carolina blue trim, while the numbers were in Carolina blue and navy trim, with navy side stripes. The navy away uniforms featured 'Charlotte' in white and Carolina blue trim, with the numbers featured the same trim as the city name, with Carolina blue side stripes. In both uniforms, the pinstripes were relegated to the sides. The uniforms bore a close resemblance to the Dallas Mavericks uniforms. The addition of Carolina blue was seen as way to connect owner Michael Jordan's collegiate roots, while the formal adoption of 'Cats' for marketing purposes reflected a popular nickname.

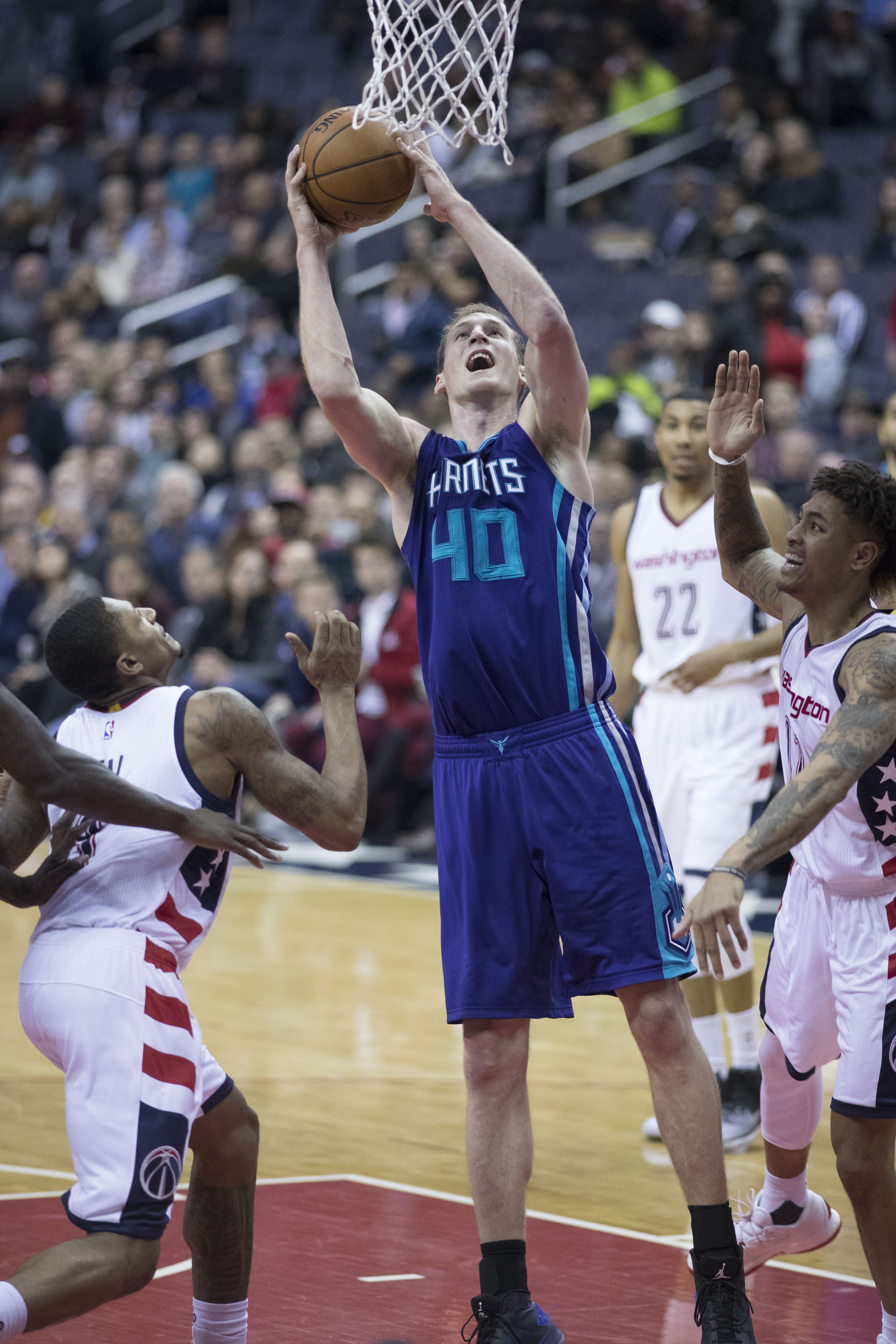
Cody Zeller in 2016, wearing revived Hornets uniform design with teal and dark purple

==== Revived Hornets ====
The newly renamed Hornets unveiled the team's uniforms on June 19, 2014, consisting of white home and purple road uniforms with the "Hornets" wordmark across the chest. The team also unveiled a teal alternate uniform with the "Charlotte" wordmark across the chest. The teal uniform is planned to be used as an alternate uniform for either home or road games and worn a total of 16–20 times per season.

On June 25, 2015, the Hornets unveiled a black sleeved alternate uniform, featuring their "Buzz City" nickname in front. The team wore the uniform for as many as six games during the 2015–16 NBA season. It was also worn during select games of the 2016 NBA playoffs.

For the 2017–18 season and beyond, the Hornets have been outfitted by Nike's Air Jordan brand endorsed by franchise owner Michael Jordan. The white "Association" uniform and the teal "Icon" uniform feature the "Hornets" wordmark in front and the silhouetted hornet on the waistband. The purple "Statement" uniform is similar to the "Icon" and "Association" uniforms, but feature the "Charlotte" wordmark in front.

The Hornets revamped their purple "Statement" uniforms prior to the 2019–20 season. The front of the uniform featured the "CHA" acronym in bold white letters with teal trim, while teal "stinger" stripes accentuate the sides. The silhouetted Hornets logo was moved to the sides of the shorts while the partial logo was placed on the beltline.

On August 31, 2020, the Hornets unveiled new uniforms that include double pinstriped jerseys that pay homage to the jerseys worn from 1997 until 2002. These are the first Hornets regular jerseys to include pinstripes since they wore them as the Bobcats from 2009 to 2012.

Before the 2022–23 season, the Hornets again made slight changes to the purple "Statement" uniform. The uniform brought back the "Hornets" wordmark in front along with white numbers and teal cell accents on each side. The "C" alternate logo was added on the beltline and the alternate "curled hornet" logo was placed below the teal cells on the shorts.

The Hornets' "City" uniforms were slight updates of Adidas' sleeved "Buzz City" uniforms. The 2017–18 version featured black letters with white trim on a black base and the sides featured a wing pattern of a hornet. This design was later revived in the 2026–27 season. The 2018–19 version was slightly tweaked to feature teal lettering and a new logo reminiscent of the original Air Jordan "Wings" logo.

The "City" uniform for the 2019–20 season moved away from the "Buzz City" concept and went with a cool grey base, purple, teal and black piping, "CHA" acronym in purple and white numbers with purple trim. A cell pattern adorned the sides.

Charlotte's "City" uniform for the 2020–21 season paid homage to the city's history as the first to house a U.S. Branch Mint and the Carolina Gold Rush. The base color is mint and letters and numbers are in granite black with metallic gold trim. Pinstripes are in gold. It also brought back the "Buzz City" crest in front. This theme was then revisited in their 2022–23 "City" uniform, this in granite black with "CLT" (Charlotte's main abbreviation) in gold with mint trim. Pinstripes alternate between gold and mint.

For the 2021–22 season, the Hornets' "City" uniform visually mixed various elements from previous identities. The cursive "Charlotte" wordmark was inspired by the banners displayed during the franchise's 1988 uniform unveiling. The number placement on the left chest was reminiscent of the Bobcats' original uniforms. The purple cells recalled the court design used at the Charlotte Coliseum, and the teal gradient contained pinstripes, reminiscent of the uniforms worn from 1988 to 1997. The original "Hugo" logo was placed on the left leg, and the script "Hornets" wordmark was added to the right leg. Along the jock tag the Hornets added the "EST. 1988" sign acknowledging the team's inaugural year.

In the 2023–24 season, the Hornets mixed both the "Buzz City" and Charlotte Mint themes for their "City" uniform. The design is a teal base with gold trim and mint side panels, with "Buzz City" in white with gold trim emblazoned in front. The mint theme was revisited anew in the 2024–25 "City" uniform, this time using the white "Association" uniform as the basis of the design.

For Charlotte's 2025–26 "City" uniform, they brought back the "mix-tape" design worn in the 2021–22 season, but featured a yellow and orange gradient inspired by the Bird of Paradise, a flower that once captivated Queen Charlotte.

The "Classic" edition featured a revival of the original Hornets pinstriped uniforms in the current Nike template. The teal version was used in the 2017–18 season, followed by a white version in 2018–19, complete with an alternate court marking the 30th anniversary of NBA basketball in Charlotte. For 2019–20, the Hornets wore purple versions of the pinstriped uniforms to commemorate the 25th anniversary of the uniform's unveiling. For the 35th anniversary season in 2023–24, the Hornets wore the throwback double pinstriped teal uniforms with purple side stripes, which they wore from 1997 to 2002. However, the Classic Edition court was not used with the uniform.

== Season-by-season record ==
List of the last five seasons completed by the Hornets. For the full season-by-season history, see List of Charlotte Hornets seasons.

Note: GP = Games played, W = Wins, L = Losses, W–L% = Winning percentage

Season	GP	W	L	W–L%	Finish	Playoffs
2021–22	82	43	39	.524	3rd, Southeast	Did not qualify
2022–23	82	27	55	.329	5th, Southeast	Did not qualify
2023–24	82	21	61	.256	4th, Southeast	Did not qualify
2024–25	82	19	63	.232	4th, Southeast	Did not qualify
2025–26	82	44	38	.537	3rd, Southeast	Did not qualify

== Arenas ==
- Charlotte Coliseum (1988–2002, 2004–2005)
- Spectrum Center (2005–present) (known as Charlotte Bobcats Arena from 2005 to 2008 and Time Warner Cable Arena from 2008 to 2016)

The Hornets played their first 15 seasons at the Charlotte Coliseum, which was called "The Hive" by fans. With over 23,000 seats, it was (and still remains) the largest basketball-specific venue in the league by seating capacity. The Coliseum hosted 371 consecutive NBA sell-outs (including seven playoff games) from December 1988 to November 1997. The Hornets would go on to lead the NBA in attendance in eight of its first nine seasons. When Charlotte returned to the NBA as the Bobcats, they temporarily played in the Coliseum in the 2004–05 season while their new arena (the Charlotte Bobcats Arena) was being built. After its completion, the city closed the old Coliseum in the 2005 off-season and opened the new arena with a Rolling Stones concert. In April 2008, the Bobcats reached a naming rights deal with Time Warner Cable, North Carolina's largest cable television provider. In exchange for the naming rights, Time Warner agreed to tear up the cable television deal that had limited the Bobcats' exposure over the team's first four years (see below). When the Hornets returned to Charlotte, "The Hive" nickname also returned to the arena. In August 2016, the arena was renamed the Spectrum Center after Time Warner's merger with Charter Communications and its Spectrum consumer/business branding.

The Hornets practice at the Novant Health Training Center, located within the Spectrum Center. Previously the team practiced at the Grady Cole Center in the Elizabeth neighborhood before moving to a purpose-built facility in Fort Mill, South Carolina located beside Knights Castle; this facility is now known as The Pointe Arts and Recreation Center.

== Personnel ==
=== Current roster ===
Charlotte Hornets roster
Players

Pos.	No.	Player	Height	Weight	DOB	From
G	10	Michael Ajayi (TW)	6 ft 7 in (2.01 m)	245 lb (111 kg)	2003-05-23	Butler
G	8	Grayson Allen	6 ft 4 in (1.93 m)	198 lb (90 kg)	1995-10-08	Duke
G	5	Christian Anderson Jr.	6 ft 1 in (1.85 m)	165 lb (75 kg)	2006-04-02	Texas Tech
G	18	Kylan Boswell (TW)	6 ft 1 in (1.85 m)	200 lb (91 kg)	2005-04-28	Illinois
F	14	Moussa Diabaté	6 ft 10 in (2.08 m)	210 lb (95 kg)	2002-01-21	Michigan
C	16	PJ Hall (TW)	6 ft 9 in (2.06 m)	245 lb (111 kg)	2002-02-21	Clemson
G	4	Sion James	6 ft 5 in (1.96 m)	220 lb (100 kg)	2002-12-04	Duke
C	11	Ryan Kalkbrenner	7 ft 1 in (2.16 m)	256 lb (116 kg)	2002-01-17	Creighton
G/F	7	Kon Knueppel (injured)	6 ft 6 in (1.98 m)	215 lb (98 kg)	2005-08-03	Duke
F	33	Liam McNeeley	6 ft 8 in (2.03 m)	210 lb (95 kg)	2005-10-10	Connecticut
F	24	Brandon Miller	6 ft 7 in (2.01 m)	200 lb (91 kg)	2002-11-22	Alabama
F	00	Royce O'Neale	6 ft 6 in (1.98 m)	226 lb (103 kg)	1993-06-05	Baylor
F/C	0	Naz Reid	6 ft 9 in (2.06 m)	264 lb (120 kg)	1999-08-26	LSU
F	31	Tidjane Salaün	6 ft 10 in (2.08 m)	207 lb (94 kg)	2005-08-10	France
G	17	Dennis Schröder	6 ft 1 in (1.85 m)	175 lb (79 kg)	1993-09-15	Germany
F	22	Hannes Steinbach	6 ft 10 in (2.08 m)	248 lb (112 kg)	2006-05-01	Germany
G	3	Coby White	6 ft 5 in (1.96 m)	210 lb (95 kg)	2000-2-16	North Carolina
F	2	Grant Williams (injured)	6 ft 7 in (2.01 m)	236 lb (107 kg)	1998-11-30	Tennessee

Coaches
Head coach
- Charles Lee
Assistant(s)
- Jermaine Bucknor
- Ryan Frazier
- Matt Hill
- Josh Longstaff
- Blaine Mueller
- Kyle Neptune
- Zach Peterson
- Lamar Skeeter

Legend
- (DP) Unsigned draft pick
- (FA) Free agent
- (S) Suspended
- (GL) On assignment to G League affiliate
- (TW) Two-way affiliate player
- Injured

Roster
Updated: October 17, 2026

=== Retained draft rights ===
The Hornets hold the draft rights to the following unsigned draft picks who have been playing outside the NBA. A drafted player is ostensibly either an international draftee or a college draftee who is not signed by the team that drafted him, is allowed to sign with any non-NBA teams. In this case, the team retains the player's draft rights in the NBA until one year after the player's contract with the non-NBA team ends. This list includes draft rights that were acquired from trades with other teams.

Draft	Round	Pick	Player	Pos.	Nationality	Current team	Note(s)	Ref
2015	2	51	Tyler Harvey	G	United States	Illawarra Hawks (Australia)	Acquired from the Orlando Magic (via Memphis)	
2022	2	50	Matteo Spagnolo	G	Italy	Alba Berlin (Germany)	Acquired from the Minnesota Timberwolves	

== Franchise records, awards and honors ==
=== Franchise leaders ===
Bold denotes still active with team. Italic denotes still active but not with team.

Points scored (regular season) as of the end of the 2025–26 season

1. Kemba Walker (12,009)
2. Dell Curry (9,839)
3. Miles Bridges (7,956)
4. Gerald Wallace (7,437)
5. Larry Johnson (7,405)
6. LaMelo Ball (6,304)
7. Terry Rozier (5,974)
8. Glen Rice (5,651)
9. Muggsy Bogues (5,531)
10. Raymond Felton (5,311)
11. David Wesley (5,241)
12. Gerald Henderson Jr. (4,701)
13. Emeka Okafor (4,630)
14. Alonzo Mourning (4,569)
15. Kendall Gill (4,159)
16. Marvin Williams (4,149)
17. Cody Zeller (4,062)
18. P. J. Washington (3,946)
19. Michael Kidd-Gilchrist (3,738)
20. Nicolas Batum (3,728)

Other statistics (regular season) as of the end of the 2025–26 season

Most minutes played
Player	Minutes
Kemba Walker	20,607
Muggsy Bogues	19,768
Dell Curry	17,613
Gerald Wallace	16,718
Miles Bridges	15,457
Larry Johnson	14,635
Raymond Felton	13,939
David Wesley	13,046
Marvin Williams	11,615
Emeka Okafor	11,212

Most rebounds
Player	Rebounds
Emeka Okafor	3,516
Larry Johnson	3,479
Gerald Wallace	3,398
Miles Bridges	3,077
Cody Zeller	2,824
Bismack Biyombo	2,625
Michael Kidd-Gilchrist	2,388
Anthony Mason	2,354
Kemba Walker	2,317
Marvin Williams	2,293

Most assists
Player	Assists
Muggsy Bogues	5,557
Kemba Walker	3,308
Raymond Felton	2,573
LaMelo Ball	2,224
David Wesley	1,911
Baron Davis	1,605
Larry Johnson	1,553
Nicolas Batum	1,521
Brevin Knight	1,497
Dell Curry	1,429

Most steals
Player	Steals
Muggsy Bogues	1,067
Gerald Wallace	827
Kemba Walker	799
Dell Curry	747
Raymond Felton	565
David Wesley	551
Baron Davis	439
LaMelo Ball	427
Kendall Gill	398
Miles Bridges	368

Most blocks
Player	Blocks
Alonzo Mourning	684
Emeka Okafor	621
Bismack Biyombo	607
Gerald Wallace	531
Elden Campbell	484
Miles Bridges	328
Cody Zeller	315
Michael Kidd-Gilchrist	301
P. J. Washington	295
Marvin Williams	287

Most three-pointers made
Player	3-pointers made
Kemba Walker	1,283
LaMelo Ball	977
Dell Curry	929
Miles Bridges	880
Terry Rozier	864
Marvin Williams	681
P. J. Washington	536
Glen Rice	508
Nicolas Batum	496
**Brandon Miller**	492

=== Individual awards ===
All-Rookie First Team

- Kendall Gill – 1991
- Larry Johnson – 1992
- Alonzo Mourning – 1993
- Emeka Okafor – 2005
- LaMelo Ball – 2021
- Brandon Miller – 2024
- Kon Knueppel – 2026

All-Rookie Second Team

- Rex Chapman – 1989
- J. R. Reid – 1990
- Raymond Felton – 2006
- Adam Morrison – 2007
- Walter Herrmann – 2007
- D. J. Augustin – 2009
- Michael Kidd-Gilchrist – 2013
- Cody Zeller – 2014
- P. J. Washington – 2020

All-NBA Second Team

- Larry Johnson – 1993
- Glen Rice – 1997

All-NBA Third Team

- Anthony Mason – 1997
- Glen Rice – 1998
- Eddie Jones – 2000
- Al Jefferson – 2014
- Kemba Walker – 2019

All-Defensive First Team

- Gerald Wallace – 2010

All-Defensive Second Team

- Anthony Mason – 1997
- Eddie Jones – 1999, 2000
- P. J. Brown – 2001

Rookie of the Year

- Larry Johnson – 1992
- Emeka Okafor – 2005
- LaMelo Ball – 2021

Sixth Man of the Year

- Dell Curry – 1994

Executive of the Year

- Bob Bass – 1997

NBA Hustle Award

- Moussa Diabaté – 2026

=== NBA All-Star Weekend ===
All-Star Selections

- Larry Johnson – 1993, 1995
- Alonzo Mourning – 1994, 1995
- Glen Rice – 1996, 1997, 1998
- Eddie Jones – 2000
- Baron Davis – 2002
- Gerald Wallace – 2010
- Kemba Walker – 2017, 2018, 2019
- LaMelo Ball – 2022

All-Star Most Valuable Player

- Glen Rice – 1997

=== Retired numbers ===
**Charlotte Hornets retired numbers**
No.	Player	Position	Tenure	Date
**13**	Bobby Phills	G	1997–2000	February 9, 2000
**30**	Dell Curry	G	1988–1998	March 19, 2026

- The Charlotte Hornets retired Phills' number on February 9, 2000, after his death in an automobile accident in Charlotte. His jersey hung from the rafters of the Charlotte Coliseum until the franchise relocated in May 2002; it was then displayed in the New Orleans Arena until 2013. On November 1, 2014, Phills' jersey was returned to Charlotte, where it was retired a second time, re-honored and currently hangs in the Spectrum Center.
- The NBA retired Bill Russell's No. 6 for all its member teams on August 11, 2022.
- The Charlotte Hornets retired Dell Curry's number on March 19, 2026.
- The Hornets will retire the No. 1 jersey of Muggsy Bogues during halftime ceremony in a game against the Milwaukee Bucks on February 11, 2027.

=== Basketball Hall of Famers ===
Charlotte Hornets Hall of Famers
Players
No.	Name	Position	Tenure	Inducted
**00**	Robert Parish	C	1994–1996	2003
**33**	Alonzo Mourning	C/F	1992–1995	2014
**12**	Vlade Divac	C	1996–1998	2019
**9**	Tony Parker	G	2018–2019	2023
**12**	Dwight Howard ^{1}	C	2017–2018	2025
Coaches
Name		Position	Tenure	Inducted
Larry Brown		Head coach	2008–2010	2002

Notes:

- ^{1} In total, Howard was inducted into the Hall of Fame twice – as player and as a member of the 2008 Olympic team

=== FIBA Hall of Famers ===
Charlotte Hornets Hall of Famers
Players
No.	Name	Position	Tenure	Inducted
**12**	Vlade Divac	C	1996–1998	2010
**33**	Alonzo Mourning	C/F	1992–1995	2019

== Mascot and cheerleaders ==
Hugo The Hornet is the current mascot of the franchise. Shortly after the news that Charlotte would get the Hornets name back, at halftime of a December 21, 2013, game between Charlotte and the Utah Jazz, Hugo was announced to return as the Charlotte Hornets' new mascot for the 2014–15 NBA season.

From 2004 to 2014, Rufus D. Lynx was the mascot of the Bobcats. He first appeared on November 1, 2003, according to his official bio on the Bobcats' website. The name comes from the scientific name of the bobcat, which is Lynx rufus. During the 2012 NBA All-Star Jam Session, Rufus D. Lynx broke a world record along with Coyote, Grizz, Hooper, and Sly the Silver Fox for most "between the legs" basketball dunks. Bleacher Report ranked Rufus as the 8th best mascot in the NBA. Rufus D. Lynx is featured in NBA Jam 2010. Rufus D. Lynx was officially retired following the conclusion of the 2013–14 NBA season, and the Hornets made him a farewell video in May 2014. The updated Hugo was unveiled on an around the city tour on June 5, 2014.

In September 2026, Hugo the Hornet was named among 20 nominees for Best NBA Mascot in the inaugural USA TODAY Sports Readers' Choice Awards. The competition featured mascots selected by an expert panel, with final rankings determined through public voting. Hugo placed second overall in the contest with more than 6,000 votes.

The Hornets have an official cheerleading squad known as the Charlotte Honey Bees. The Honey Bees perform sideline dances as well as center-court dances during games. They also represent the Hornets brand as ambassadors to the community and are involved in community service activities and charity functions. When the team was known as the Bobcats, the cheerleaders were called the Lady Cats.

== Media coverage ==
From 1988 to 1992, the Hornets aired most road games, and occasional home games, on a network of stations in North Carolina, South Carolina and Virginia fronted by WCCB in Charlotte. WCCB's longtime owner, Cy Bahakel, was a minority partner in the Hornets' original ownership group. Starting with the 1990–91 season, several games also aired on the original SportSouth, forerunner of Bally Sports South, for customers in North and South Carolina. WJZY became the Hornets' over-the-air flagship in 1992, and remained as such until 1998. From 1995 to 1998, some games aired on WJZY's sister station, WFVT-TV (now WMYT-TV). WAXN-TV became the flagship for the 1998–99 season, and remained as such until the original team departed in 2002. Generally, most home games slated for telecast aired on SportSouth/Fox Sports South.

When the team returned as the Bobcats in 2004, Johnson partnered with Time Warner to create Carolinas Sports Entertainment Television (C-SET), a regional sports network. It aired 60 Bobcats games that also aired on Comporium Cable in the South Carolina portion of the Charlotte market. However, Time Warner placed C-SET on its digital package as an incentive to try to get customers to switch to its digital service, leaving analog customers in the dark. It also refused to allow DirecTV or Dish Network to pick up C-SET on their local feeds. As a result, Time Warner customers without digital cable, as well as western North Carolina and most of South Carolina, were left to rely on radio coverage.

C-SET folded on the day of the 2005 NBA draft, and most games then moved to News 14 Carolina, a cable news channel available on Time Warner Cable's systems in Charlotte, the Triad and the Triangle. However, this still left viewers in most of South Carolina (except for the South Carolina side of the Charlotte area, which saw games on Comporium) as well as eastern and western North Carolina, out in the cold. News 14 was also not available on satellite.

As part of the Time Warner Cable Arena deal, the Bobcats signed over broadcasting rights to Fox Sports South. Starting with the last five games of the 2007–08 season, about 70 games per season were shown on Fox Sports Carolinas (Fox Sports South's new regional feed, later reintegrated to FanDuel Sports Network South) and sister network Sportsouth (renamed Fox Sports Southeast in 2015 and later Bally Sports Southeast in 2021 and FanDuel Sports Network Southeast in 2024) in North and South Carolina. The deal is believed to be the first simultaneous naming rights and broadcast rights deal in the history of North American professional sports. As of the 2020–21 season, Hornets games are carried by Bally Sports Southeast with Eric Collins and Dell Curry, along with in-game reporter and Hornets Live host Shannon Spake. Former personnel include: Stephanie Ready, who worked as a sideline reporter and in-game analyst for the Hornets for a decade before moving to Turner Sports in 2018, and long time Hornets broadcaster Steve Martin, who retired after the 2017–18 season.

For the team's first four seasons after their return to the league, select games also aired on a network of over-the-air stations across North Carolina, South Carolina and Virginia, fronted by WJZY from 2004 to 2006 and WMYT from 2006 to 2008. Network simulcasts returned in 2024 when WSOC-TV and WAXN agreed to air a package of home and away games, which would also be syndicated to other broadcast stations throughout North and South Carolina.

In August 2026, following the closure of the FanDuel Sports Networks, the Hornets would announce a deal with WSOC and WAXN to become the full-time home of the team beginning in the 2026–27 season.

The team's radio flagship is all-sports station WFNZ-FM. Before 2010, games had aired on WOLS. WOLS switched its non-sports programming from oldies to Spanish language on January 1, 2009, making Bobcats and Duke basketball the station's only non-Spanish language programming. WBT was the Hornets' radio flagship during the original franchise's entire run.
