= Ecko Unltd. =

American urban fashion company

Yakira, L.L.C.
- Trade name: Ecko Unlimited
- Type: Subsidiary
- Industry: Clothing industry
- Founded: 1993
- Founder: Marc Ecko
- Headquarters: New York City, U.S.
- Area served: Worldwide
- Key people: Marc Ecko (CCO)
- Parent: Iconix Brand Group
- Website: ecko.com

Yakira, L.L.C., trade name Ecko Unltd., is an American urban fashion company founded by Marc Ecko in 1993. The company makes apparel and accessories under the brands Ecko Unltd. line for men and the Ecko Red line for girls and women. It is headquartered in New York City.

The company's products gained public attention in the late 1990s; they were originally associated with hip-hop and skate culture and moved into mainstream urban culture in the early 2000s. It is most often associated with hip-hop.

The style is based on graffiti art. The brand features a rhinoceros as its logo. Rap artist MC Serch of 3rd Bass assisted with marketing in the early years of the company.

== History ==
Ecko Unltd. is a streetwear brand that was founded by Marc Ecko, an American fashion designer and entrepreneur, in 1993. The brand was originally established as a T-shirt company and quickly gained a following among hip-hop and urban culture enthusiasts. Ecko Unltd. has also been involved in several partnerships and collaborations with other brands, artists, and musicians including Spike Lee and Chuck D, as well as having a segment in Good Morning America that featured its T-shirt designs.

The company later acquired Avirex and Zoo York. In 2009, Ecko Unlimited had over $1 billion in global revenue and was the largest brand in streetwear.

On October 27, 2009, Iconix Brand Group paid $109 million for a 51% stake in Ecko Unlimited. It acquired full ownership in May 2013.

In 2014, the operator of Ecko Untld. stores filed for Chapter 11 bankruptcy protection, blaming a decreasing target audience and an economic downturn as a result of the decision.

== Sponsorships ==
Ecko Unltd. has sponsored several artists, musicians, and athletes over the years as part of its marketing and brand-building efforts. Ecko Unltd. has been a sponsor of several streetwear and urban culture events, including fashion shows, streetwear exhibitions, and trade shows.

Ecko Unltd. has worked with action-sports athletes and boxers, including professional skateboarder Manny Santiago and professional boxer Danny Garcia, as part of its ambassador programs during the Iconix ownership period. In 2016, the company announced a marketing partnership with recording artist Prince Royce, who appeared in campaigns and curated a capsule collection the following year.

In 2025, the brand introduced NBA All-Star Jalen “J-Dub” Williams as a brand ambassador and capsule collaborator, with a capsule targeted for a Holiday 2025 release.

=== Freestyle Motocross ===
- Mike Metzger
- Jeremy Stenberg

== See also ==
- Stüssy
- Billionaire Boys Club
- The Hundreds
- Supreme
