= Marc Ecko =

American fashion designer

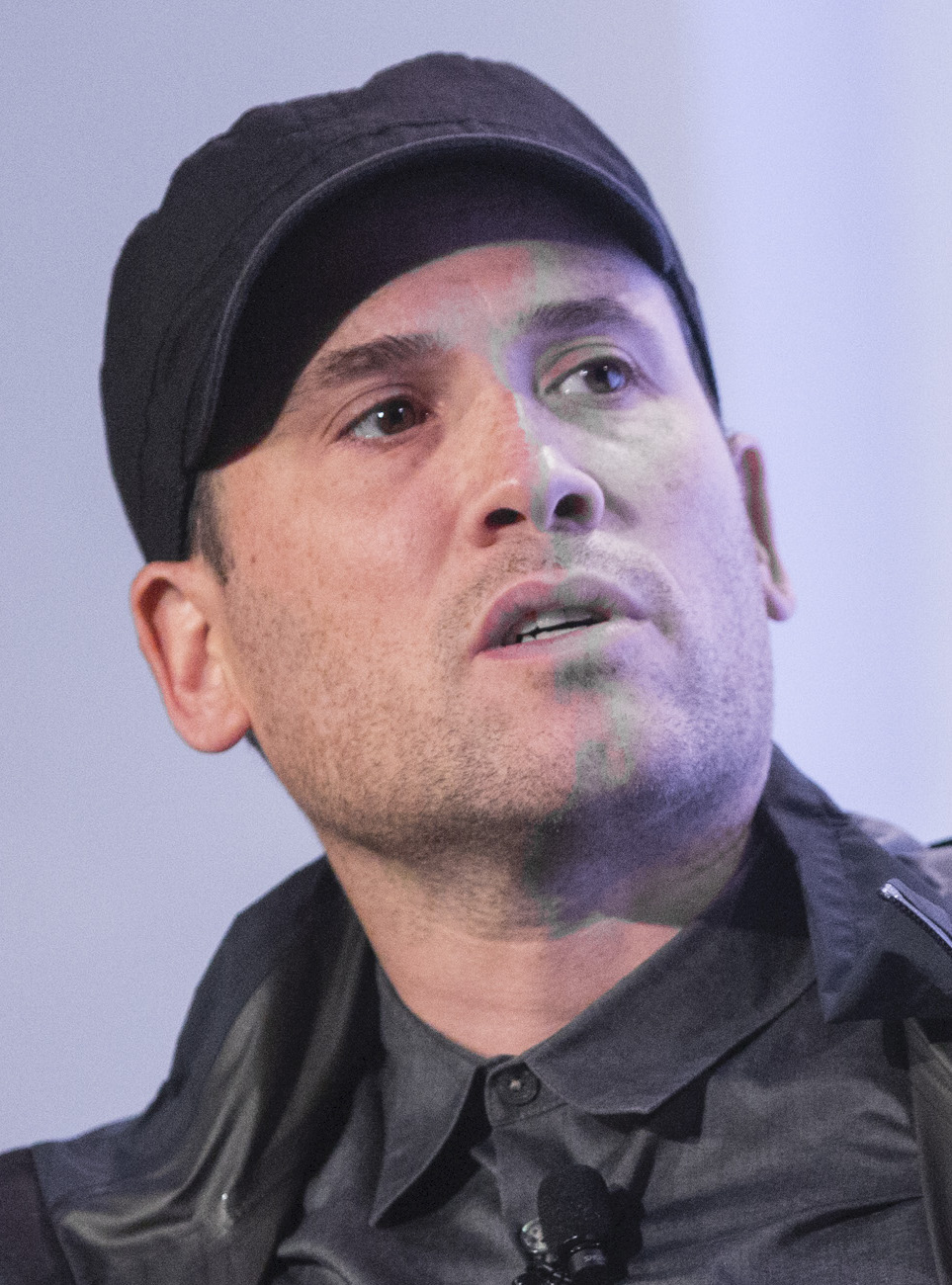
- Ecko in 2015
- Born: Marc Louis Milecofsky; August 29, 1972 (age 54); Livingston, New Jersey, U.S.
- Education: Rutgers University
- Occupations: Fashion designer; artist; entrepreneur
- Known for: Founding Ecko Unltd. and Complex
- Spouse: Allison Rojas (m. 2000)
- Children: 3

Marc Louis Ecko (né Milecofsky; August 29, 1972) is an American fashion designer, entrepreneur, and artist. He is the founder and chief creative officer of fashion company Ecko Unlimited. He also founded Complex magazine in 2002.

== Early life ==
Milecofsky was born in New Jersey on August 29, 1972. He was brought up with his twin Marci and an older sister, Shari, in suburban Lakewood, New Jersey, where his father was a pharmacist and his mother was a real estate broker.

After high school, Milecofsky entered Rutgers University's College of Pharmacy in Piscataway, New Jersey. During this time he painted graffiti and practiced drawing, using the name "Echo". In his third year, the school's dean, John L. Colaizzi, Sr., encouraged Milecofsky to follow his passion and take a year off to pursue art.

In 1996, Milecofsky legally changed his name to Ecko; he had intended to use "Echo", the name he was now known by, but since he wanted to build a brand with the name, and "Echo" was already taken, he settled on the alternate spelling.

== Career ==
In 1993, Ecko started Ecko Unltd. as a T-shirt company, with small investments from his sister and a friend, Seth Gerszberg. He traveled to Hong Kong to learn about the clothing industry. Early clients Spike Lee and Chuck D helped bring attention to his fledgling business, as did a Good Morning America segment that featured his T-shirt designs. The company expanded further into hip-hop and skater styles, and began to sport a rhinoceros logo.

Ecko's businesses have expanded to include Complex magazine, video and social gaming, and venture capital.

Ecko was appointed to the Board of Directors of the Council of Fashion Designers of America (CFDA); the youngest designer to do so. Since 2010, he has been a member of the Emeritus Board.

In 2008, he created the new jackets for the Iron Chefs on Iron Chef America.

== Personal life ==
Ecko is Jewish. In 2000, Ecko married Allison Rojas. They have three children and live in Bernardsville, New Jersey.

In 2011, Ecko started Unlimited Justice, a social activism campaign which opposed corporal punishment in U.S. schools.

He has supported a number of charities and organisations, including raising money for the Tikva Children's Home in Odesa, Ukraine.

== Published work ==
On October 1, 2013, Ecko released an autobiographical business book, Unlabel: Selling You Without Selling Out, which offers advice on entrepreneurship and personal branding.

== See also ==
- Marc Ecko's Getting Up: Contents Under Pressure
