= 2006 NCAA Division I men's basketball tournament =

Edition of USA college basketball tournament

- Season: 2005–06
- Teams: 65
- Finals site: RCA Dome, Indianapolis, Indiana
- Champions: Florida Gators (1st title, 2nd title game, 3rd Final Four)
- Runner-up: UCLA Bruins (13th title game, 16th Final Four)
- Semifinalists: George Mason Patriots (1st Final Four); LSU Tigers (4th Final Four)
- Winning coach: Billy Donovan (1st title)
- MOP: Joakim Noah (Florida)
- Attendance: 70,254
- Top scorers: Glen Davis (LSU); Joakim Noah (Florida) (97 points)

The 2006 NCAA Division I men's basketball tournament involved 65 teams playing in a single-elimination tournament to determine the national champion of men's NCAA Division I college basketball as a culmination of the 2005–06 basketball season. The 68th annual edition of the tournament began on March 14, 2006, and concluded with the championship game on April 3 at the RCA Dome in Indianapolis, Indiana. This was the last time the Final Four was played in the RCA Dome, as it was demolished in 2008.

The Final Four featured no top seeds for the first time since the tournament expanded to 64 teams in 1985 (the first time since 1980), with the highest remaining seed being Oakland region winner, #2 UCLA, making their first Final Four appearance since their 1995 national championship. For only the second time in history, an 11-seed advanced to the Final Four as George Mason of the Colonial Athletic Association (CAA) won the Washington, D.C. region. Those two teams were joined by Atlanta region winner LSU (who was the first team to advance to the Final Four as an 11-seed in 1986), and Minneapolis region winner Florida, who had not made the Final Four since their runner-up finish in 2000 also in Indianapolis

UCLA made the final four after Stanford missed the NCAA tournament since 1988. a feat not repeated until 2025 when UCLA reached it first women's final four while Stanford missed the NCAA tournament since 1987.

Florida won its first-ever national basketball championship by defeating UCLA 73–57 in the final game. Florida's Joakim Noah was named the Most Outstanding Player of the NCAA tournament.

George Mason's run was one of several upsets by lower-seeded teams in the tournament. For the second consecutive year, a No. 14 seed beat a No. 3 seed as Northwestern State defeated Iowa. No. 13 seed Bradley also defeated No. 4 seed Kansas and advanced to the Sweet Sixteen by defeating No. 5-seeded Pittsburgh in the second round. Two No. 12 seeds won as well, as Montana and Texas A&M both won their respective First round matchups. For the second straight year, Milwaukee won as a double-digit seed, this time as the No. 11-seeded Panthers defeated Oklahoma in the first round.

American East Conference champion Albany and ASUN champion Belmont made their first appearance in the tournament.

== Tournament procedure ==
A total of 65 teams were selected to participate in the tournament. Of that total, 31 of the teams earned automatic bids by winning their conference tournaments. Penn earned an automatic bid by winning the regular-season title of the Ivy League, which did not conduct a conference tournament. The remaining 34 teams were granted "at-large" bids, which are extended by the NCAA Selection Committee.

The initial game on March 14 officially named the opening round game, but popularly called the "play-in game", had Monmouth, winner of the Northeast Conference tournament, facing Hampton, who won the Mid-Eastern Athletic Conference tournament, for a chance to play top seed Villanova in the first round of the Tournament. Monmouth defeated Hampton, 71–49, to advance to play Villanova.

All teams were seeded from 1 to 16 within their regions. The Selection Committee seeded the entire field from 1 to 65. In a practice used since 2004, the ranking of the four top seeds against each other would determine the pairings in the Final Four. The top overall seed would be seeded to play the fourth overall seed in the national semifinals, should both teams advance that far. In 2006, these rankings were as follows: No. 1 Duke, No. 2 Connecticut, No. 3 Villanova, and No. 4 Memphis.

== Schedule and venues ==
2006 play-in game (orange) and first and second rounds (green)
2006 Regionals (blue) and Final Four (red)

The following are the sites that were selected to host each round of the 2006 tournament:

Opening Round

- March 14
  - University of Dayton Arena, Dayton, Ohio (Host: University of Dayton)

First and Second Rounds

- March 16 and 18
  - Cox Arena, San Diego, California (Host: San Diego State University)
  - Greensboro Coliseum, Greensboro, North Carolina (Host: Atlantic Coast Conference)
  - Jacksonville Veterans Memorial Arena, Jacksonville, Florida (Host: Jacksonville University)
  - Jon M. Huntsman Center, Salt Lake City, Utah (Host: University of Utah)
- March 17 and 19
  - American Airlines Center, Dallas, Texas (Host: Big 12 Conference)
  - The Palace of Auburn Hills, Auburn Hills, Michigan (Hosts: Oakland University, Mid-Continent Conference)
  - University of Dayton Arena, Dayton, Ohio (Host: University of Dayton)
  - Wachovia Center, Philadelphia, Pennsylvania (Host: Atlantic 10 Conference)

Regional semifinals and finals (Sweet Sixteen and Elite Eight)

- March 23 and 25
  - Atlanta Regional, Georgia Dome, Atlanta, Georgia (Host: Georgia Institute of Technology)
  - Oakland Regional, Oakland Arena, Oakland, California (Hosts: University of San Francisco, West Coast Conference)
- March 24 and 26
  - Minneapolis Regional, Hubert H. Humphrey Metrodome, Minneapolis, Minnesota (Host: University of Minnesota)
  - Washington, D.C. Regional, Verizon Center, Washington, D.C. (Host: Georgetown University)

National semifinals and championship (Final Four and championship)

- April 1 and 3
  - RCA Dome, Indianapolis, Indiana (Hosts: Butler University, Horizon League)

== Qualifying teams ==
=== Automatic bids ===
The following teams were automatic qualifiers for the 2006 NCAA field by virtue of winning their conference's tournament (except for the Ivy League, whose regular-season champion received the automatic bid).

Conference	School	Appearance	Last bid
ACC	Duke	30th	2005
America East	Albany	1st	Never
Atlantic 10	Xavier	17th	2004
Atlantic Sun	Belmont	1st	Never
Big 12	Kansas	35th	2005
Big East	Syracuse	31st	2005
Big Sky	Montana	7th	2005
Big South	Winthrop	6th	2005
Big Ten	Iowa	22nd	2005
Big West	Pacific	8th	2005
Colonial	UNC Wilmington	4th	2003
C-USA	Memphis	19th	2004
Horizon	UW-Milwaukee	3rd	2005
Ivy League	Penn	22nd	2005
MAAC	Iona	8th	2001
MAC	Kent State	4th	2002
MEAC	Hampton	3rd	2002
Mid-Con	Oral Roberts	3rd	1984
Missouri Valley	Southern Illinois	9th	2005
Mountain West	San Diego State	5th	2002
Northeast	Monmouth	4th	2004
Ohio Valley	Murray State	13th	2004
Pac-10	UCLA	40th	2005
Patriot	Bucknell	4th	2005
SEC	Florida	12th	2005
Southern	Davidson	8th	2002
Southland	Northwestern State	2nd	2001
Sun Belt	South Alabama	7th	1998
SWAC	Southern	7th	1993
WAC	Nevada	5th	2005
West Coast	Gonzaga	9th	2005

=== Listed by region and seeding ===
Atlanta Regional
Seed	School	Conference	Record	Berth Type
#1	Duke	ACC	30–3	Automatic
#2	Texas	Big 12	27–6	At-large
#3	Iowa	Big Ten	25–8	Automatic
#4	LSU	SEC	23–8	At-large
#5	Syracuse	Big East	23–11	Automatic
#6	West Virginia	Big East	20–10	At-large
#7	California	Pac-10	20–10	At-large
#8	George Washington	Atlantic 10	26–2	At-large
#9	UNC Wilmington	CAA	25–7	Automatic
#10	NC State	ACC	21–9	At-large
#11	Southern Illinois	Missouri Valley	22–10	Automatic
#12	Texas A&M	Big 12	21–8	At-large
#13	Iona	MAAC	23–7	Automatic
#14	Northwestern State	Southland	25–7	Automatic
#15	Pennsylvania	Ivy	20–8	Automatic
#16	Southern	SWAC	19–12	Automatic

Washington, D.C. Regional
Seed	School	Conference	Record	Berth Type
#1	Connecticut	Big East	27–3	At-large
#2	Tennessee	SEC	21–7	At-large
#3	North Carolina	ACC	22–7	At-large
#4	Illinois	Big Ten	25–6	At-large
#5	Washington	Pac-10	24–6	At-large
#6	Michigan State	Big Ten	22–11	At-large
#7	Wichita State	Missouri Valley	24–8	At-large
#8	Kentucky	SEC	21–12	At-large
#9	UAB	C-USA	24–6	At-large
#10	Seton Hall	Big East	18–11	At-large
#11	George Mason	CAA	25–7	At-large
#12	Utah State	WAC	23–8	At-large
#13	Air Force	Mountain West	24–6	At-large
#14	Murray State	Ohio Valley	24–6	Automatic
#15	Winthrop	Big South	23–7	Automatic
#16	Albany	America East	21–10	Automatic

Oakland Regional
Seed	School	Conference	Record	Berth Type
#1	Memphis	C-USA	30–3	Automatic
#2	UCLA	Pac-10	27–6	Automatic
#3	Gonzaga	WCC	27–3	Automatic
#4	Kansas	Big 12	25–7	Automatic
#5	Pittsburgh	Big East	24–7	At-large
#6	Indiana	Big Ten	18–11	At-large
#7	Marquette	Big East	20–10	At-large
#8	Arkansas	SEC	22–9	At-large
#9	Bucknell	Patriot	26–4	Automatic
#10	Alabama	SEC	17–12	At-large
#11	San Diego State	Mountain West	24–8	Automatic
#12	Kent State	MAC	25–8	Automatic
#13	Bradley	Missouri Valley	20–10	At-large
#14	Xavier	Atlantic 10	21–10	Automatic
#15	Belmont	Atlantic Sun	20–10	Automatic
#16	Oral Roberts	Mid-Continent	21–11	Automatic

Minneapolis Regional
Seed	School	Conference	Record	Berth Type
#1	Villanova	Big East	25–4	At-large
#2	Ohio State	Big Ten	25–5	At-large
#3	Florida	SEC	27–6	Automatic
#4	Boston College	ACC	26–7	At-large
#5	Nevada	WAC	27–5	Automatic
#6	Oklahoma	Big 12	20–8	At-large
#7	Georgetown	Big East	21–9	At-large
#8	Arizona	Pac-10	19–12	At-large
#9	Wisconsin	Big Ten	19–11	At-large
#10	Northern Iowa	Missouri Valley	23–9	At-large
#11	UW-Milwaukee	Horizon	21–8	Automatic
#12	Montana	Big Sky	23–6	Automatic
#13	Pacific	Big West	24–7	Automatic
#14	South Alabama	Sun Belt	24–6	Automatic
#15	Davidson	Southern	18–10	Automatic
#16	Monmouth	Northeast	18–14	Automatic
#16	Hampton	MEAC	16–15	Automatic

=== Bids by conference ===
Bids	Conference(s)	Schools
8	Big East	Connecticut, Georgetown, Marquette, Pittsburgh, Seton Hall, Syracuse, Villanova, West Virginia
6	Big Ten	Illinois, Indiana, Iowa, Michigan State, Ohio State, Wisconsin
6	SEC	Alabama, Arkansas, Florida, Kentucky, LSU, Tennessee
4	ACC	Boston College, Duke, NC State, North Carolina
4	Big 12	Kansas, Oklahoma, Texas, Texas A&M
4	Missouri Valley	Bradley, Northern Iowa, Southern Illinois, Wichita State
4	Pac-10	Arizona, California, UCLA, Washington
2	Atlantic 10	George Washington, Xavier
2	CAA	George Mason, UNC Wilmington
2	C-USA	Memphis, UAB
2	Mountain West	Air Force, San Diego State
2	WAC	Nevada, Utah State
1	19 other conferences	

== Bracket ==
=== Opening Round game – Dayton, Ohio ===
Winner advances to Minneapolis Regional vs. No. 1 Villanova.

Opening Round; March 13
16	Monmouth	71
16	Hampton	49

=== Atlanta Regional ===
First round
1	Duke	70
16	Southern	54
Greensboro - Thu/Sat
8	George Washington	88^{OT}
9	UNC-Wilmington	85
5	Syracuse	58
12	Texas A&M	66
Jacksonville - Thu/Sat
4	LSU	80
13	Iona	64
6	West Virginia	64
11	Southern Illinois	46
Auburn Hills - Fri/Sun
3	Iowa	63
14	Northwestern State	64
7	California	52
10	NC State	58
Dallas - Fri/Sun
2	Texas	60
15	Pennsylvania	52

Quarter-finals
1	Duke	74
8	George Washington	61
12	Texas A&M	57
4	LSU	58
6	West Virginia	67
14	Northwestern State	54
10	NC State	54
2	Texas	75

Semi-finals
1	Duke	54
4	LSU	62
6	West Virginia	71
2	Texas	74

Final
4	LSU	70^{OT}
2	Texas	60

=== Oakland Regional ===
First round
1	Memphis	94
16	Oral Roberts	78
Dallas - Fri/Sun
8	Arkansas	55
9	Bucknell	59
5	Pittsburgh	79
12	Kent State	64
Auburn Hills - Fri/Sun
4	Kansas	73
13	Bradley	77
6	Indiana	87
11	San Diego State	83
Salt Lake City - Thu/Sat
3	Gonzaga	79
14	Xavier	75
7	Marquette	85
10	Alabama	90
San Diego - Thu/Sat
2	UCLA	78
15	Belmont	44

Quarter-finals
1	Memphis	72
9	Bucknell	56
5	Pittsburgh	66
13	Bradley	72
6	Indiana	80
3	Gonzaga	90
10	Alabama	59
2	UCLA	62

Semi-finals
1	Memphis	80
13	Bradley	64
3	Gonzaga	71
2	UCLA	73

Final
1	Memphis	45
2	UCLA	50

=== Minneapolis Regional ===
First round
1	Villanova	58
16	Monmouth	45
Philadelphia - Fri/Sun
8	Arizona	94
9	Wisconsin	75
5	Nevada	79
12	Montana	87
Salt Lake City - Thu/Sat
4	Boston College	88^{2OT}
13	Pacific	76
6	Oklahoma	74
11	UW–Milwaukee	82
Jacksonville - Thu/Sat
3	Florida	76
14	South Alabama	50
7	Georgetown	54
10	Northern Iowa	49
Dayton - Fri/Sun
2	Ohio State	70
15	Davidson	62

Quarter-finals
1	Villanova	82
8	Arizona	78
12	Montana	56
4	Boston College	69
11	UW–Milwaukee	60
3	Florida	82
7	Georgetown	70
2	Ohio State	52

Semi-finals
1	Villanova	60^{OT}
4	Boston College	59
3	Florida	57
7	Georgetown	53

Final
1	Villanova	62
3	Florida	75

=== Washington, D.C. Regional ===
First round
1	Connecticut	72
16	Albany	59
Philadelphia - Fri/Sun
8	Kentucky	69
9	UAB	64
5	Washington	75
12	Utah State	61
San Diego - Thu/Sat
4	Illinois	78
13	Air Force	69
6	Michigan State	65
11	George Mason	75
Dayton - Fri/Sun
3	North Carolina	69
14	Murray State	65
7	Wichita State	86
10	Seton Hall	66
Greensboro - Thu/Sat
2	Tennessee	63
15	Winthrop	61

Quarter-finals
1	Connecticut	87
8	Kentucky	83
5	Washington	67
4	Illinois	64
11	George Mason	65
3	North Carolina	60
7	Wichita State	80
2	Tennessee	73

Semi-finals
1	Connecticut	98^{OT}
5	Washington	92
11	George Mason	63
7	Wichita State	55

Final
1	Connecticut	84
11	George Mason	86^{OT}

=== Final Four – Indianapolis, Indiana ===
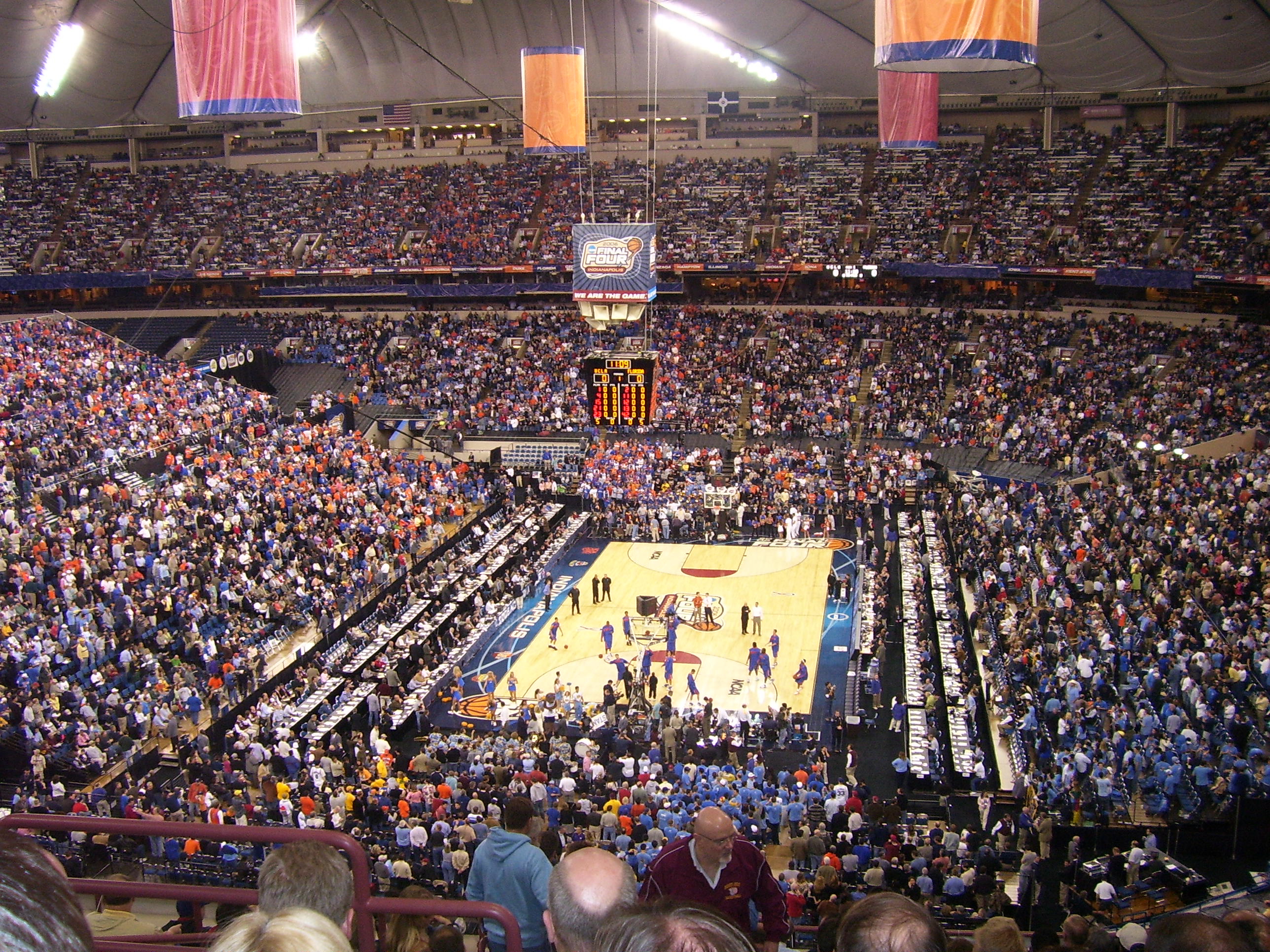
RCA Dome during the Final Four

National semifinals
AT4	LSU	45
OA2	UCLA	59
MI3	Florida	73
WA11	George Mason	58

National Championship Game
OA2	UCLA	57
MI3	Florida	73

== Record by conference ==
Conference	# of Bids	Record	Win %	R32	S16	E8	F4	CG
Big East	8	11–8	.579	5	4	2	–	–
SEC	6	13–5	.722	5	2	2	2	1
Big Ten	6	3–6	.333	3	–	–	–	–
ACC	4	6–4	.600	4	2	–	–	–
Big 12	4	4–4	.500	2	1	1	–	–
Pac-10	4	8–4	.667	3	2	1	1	1
Missouri Valley	4	4–4	.500	2	2	–	–	–
Atlantic 10	2	1–2	.333	1	–	–	–	–
CAA	2	4–2	.667	1	1	1	1	–
C–USA	2	3–2	.600	1	1	1	–	–
MWC	2	0–2	.000	–	–	–	–	–
WAC	2	0–2	.000	–	–	–	–	–
Southland Conference	1	1–1	.500	1	–	–	–	–
WCC	1	2–1	.667	1	1	–	–	–
Patriot League	1	1–1	.500	1	–	–	–	–
Horizon League	1	1–1	.500	1	–	–	–	–
Big Sky Conference	1	1–1	.500	1	–	–	–	–
Northeast Conference	1	1–1*	.500	–	–	–	–	–

*Monmouth University won the Opening Round game.

The America East, Atlantic Sun, Big South, Big West, Ivy, MAAC, MAC, MEAC, Ohio Valley, SoCon, SWAC, Mid-Continent, and Sun Belt conferences all went 0–1.

The columns R32, S16, E8, F4, and CG respectively stand for the Round of 32, Sweet Sixteen, Elite Eight, Final Four, and championship Game.

== Announcers ==
- Jim Nantz/Billy Packer/Dan Bonner – First & Second Round at Philadelphia, Pennsylvania; Minneapolis Regional at the Hubert H. Humphrey Metrodome; Final Four at Indianapolis, Indiana
- Dick Enberg/Jay Bilas/Bob Wenzel – First & Second Round at San Diego, California; Atlanta Regional at the Georgia Dome
- Verne Lundquist/Bill Raftery/Mike Gminski – First & Second Round at Auburn Hills, Michigan; Washington, D.C. Regional at the Verizon Center
- Gus Johnson/Len Elmore/Tracy Wolfson – First & Second Round at Dayton, Ohio; Oakland Regional at the Oakland Arena
- Kevin Harlan/Dan Bonner – First & Second Round at Greensboro, North Carolina
- Ian Eagle/Jim Spanarkel – First & Second Round at Salt Lake City, Utah
- Craig Bolerjack/Bob Wenzel – First & Second Round at Dallas, Texas
- Tim Brando/Stephen Bardo/Mike Gminski – First & Second Round at Jacksonville, Florida

Greg Gumbel once again served as the studio host, joined by analysts Clark Kellogg and Seth Davis.

== See also ==
- 2006 NCAA Division II men's basketball tournament
- 2006 NCAA Division III men's basketball tournament
- 2006 NCAA Division I women's basketball tournament
- 2006 NCAA Division II women's basketball tournament
- 2006 NCAA Division III women's basketball tournament
- 2006 National Invitation Tournament
- 2006 Women's National Invitation Tournament
- 2006 NAIA Division I men's basketball tournament
- 2006 NAIA Division II men's basketball tournament

== Notes ==
- The futures of two of this year's Final Four teams would be polar opposites of the other two in 2007. Both George Mason and LSU would fail to receive a bid to either the NCAA tournament or the NIT, while both Florida and UCLA would return to the Final Four (the two teams would have a rematch, this time in the semifinals, with the same result, a Florida victory).
- George Mason became the first team from a "mid-major" conference to reach the Final Four since UNLV's loss to Duke in 1991.
- This was the second of four Final Fours to feature no No. 1 seeds (1980, 2011, and 2023 being the others).
- Duke was the last team before Florida to win back-to-back titles, and like Florida, they won their first of the two in Indianapolis at the RCA Dome.
