= 2006 NCAA Division I men's basketball championship game =

American college basketball final

National championship game
Florida Gators	UCLA Bruins
SEC	Pac-10
(32–6)	(32–6)
73	57
Head coach: Billy Donovan	Head coach: Ben Howland
- AP: 11
- Coaches: 10
- AP: T-7
- Coaches: 8
	1st half	2nd half	Total
Florida Gators	36	37	73
UCLA Bruins	25	32	57
- Date: April 3, 2006
- Venue: RCA Dome, Indianapolis, Indiana
- MVP: Joakim Noah, Florida
- Favorite: Florida by 1
- Referees: James Burr, John Cahill, Tony Greene
- Attendance: 43,168

United States TV coverage
- Network: CBS
- Announcers: Jim Nantz (play-by-play); Billy Packer (color); Dan Bonner (sideline)
- Nielsen Ratings: 11.2

The 2006 NCAA Division I men's basketball championship game was the finals of the 2006 NCAA Division I men's basketball tournament and it determined the national champion for the 2005-06 NCAA Division I men's basketball season. The game was played at the RCA Dome in Indianapolis, Indiana, and featured the Oakland Regional Champion, No. 2-seeded UCLA and the Minneapolis Regional Champion, No. 3-seeded Florida.

== Participants ==
=== Florida Gators ===
Florida entered the tournament as the No. 3 seed in the Minneapolis Regional. In the 1st round, Lee Humphrey scored 20 points, Joakim Noah scored 16 points, and Al Horford scored 14 points to lead Florida past South Alabama with a 76–50 victory. In the 2nd round, Corey Brewer scored 23 points and Joakim Noah scored 17 points to rout Milwaukee with an 82–60 victory. In the Sweet 16, Corey Brewer made a twisting falling down shot which became a three-point play with 27.5 seconds remaining to defeat Georgetown 57–53 and advance to the Elite Eight. In the Elite Eight, Joakim Noah had a monster night by scoring 21 points which led to Florida beating Villanova 75–62 and advancing to the Final Four. In their semifinal matchup against Cinderella team George Mason, Florida had a successful night from outside the arc and won 73–58 for a trip to the title game.

=== UCLA Bruins ===
UCLA entered the tournament as the No. 2 seed in the Oakland Regional. In the 1st round, UCLA routed Belmont with a 78–44 victory in the battle of the Bruins. In the 2nd round, Jordan Farmar scored 18 points making five three-pointers which was supported by Arron Afflalo's 13 points and Ryan Hollins's 12 points to beat Alabama 62–59 for a trip to Oakland for the Sweet 16. In the Sweet 16, UCLA finished the game with an 11–0 run to complete a 17-point comeback for a 73–71 win over Gonzaga. In the Elite Eight, Arron Afflalo scored 15 points to beat Memphis 50–45 in the lowest scoring Regional Finals during the shot-clock era to send UCLA to the Final Four. In the national semifinal, UCLA shut down LSU 59–45 to advance to the title game.

== Starting lineups ==
Florida	Position	UCLA
Taurean Green	G	Jordan Farmar
Lee Humphrey	G	Arron Afflalo
Corey Brewer	F	Cedric Bozeman
Joakim Noah	F	Luc Richard Mbah a Moute
Al Horford	C	Ryan Hollins

== Game summary ==
CBS

April 3, 2006
9:21 PM ET

Recap

#OA2 UCLA Bruins 57, #MI3 Florida Gators 73
Scoring by half: 25–36, 32–37
Pts: Jordan Farmar 18; Rebs: Luc Richard Mbah a Moute, Ryan Hollins 10; Asts: Luc Richard Mbah a Moute 4	Pts: Joakim Noah 16; Rebs: Joakim Noah 9 Asts: Taurean Green 8

RCA Dome, Indianapolis, Indiana
Attendance: 51, 458
