= Belmont Bruins men's basketball statistical leaders =

The Belmont Bruins men's basketball statistical leaders are individual statistical leaders of the Belmont Bruins men's basketball program in various categories, including points, rebounds, assists, steals, and blocks. Within those areas, the lists identify single-game, single-season, and career leaders. The Bruins represent Belmont University in the NCAA Division I Missouri Valley Conference.

Belmont began competing in intercollegiate basketball in 1952 as a member of the National Association of Intercollegiate Athletics (NAIA), and did not join the NCAA until the 1996–97 season. While the NCAA did not officially record assists as a stat until the 1983–84 season, and blocks and steals until the 1985–86 season, the NAIA has recorded these statistics over a noticeably longer time frame. (Note: Although the NAIA's official regular-season record book does not indicate when it began recording various statistics on a national basis, the current records (as of 2019–20) for single-game and single-season assists were both set in 1972–73, and the career record for blocks dates to 1975.) Belmont's record books includes players in these stats before these seasons. These lists are updated through the end of the 2020–21 season.

== Scoring ==
Career
Rk	Player	Points	Seasons
1	Joe Behling	2823	1986–87 1987–88 1988–89 1989–90
2	DaQuinn Goff	2487	1993–94 1994–95 1995–96
3	Robert Barnes	2305	1953–54 1954–55 1955–56
4	Troy Hall	2105	1979–80 1980–81 1981–82 1982–83
5	Kerry West	2098	1992–93 1993–94 1994–95 1995–96
6	Scott Corley	2062	1986–87 1987–88 1988–89 1989–90
7	Al Allen	2030	1993–94 1994–95 1995–96
8	Reggie Little	2002	1983–84 1984–85 1985–86 1986–87
9	Greg Thurman	1979	1989–90 1990–91 1991–92
10	Joe Gaines	1955	1968–69 1969–70 1970–71 1971–72

Season
Rk	Player	Points	Season
1	Joe Behling	1071	1988–89
2	Joe Behling	989	1989–90
3	DaQuinn Goff	909	1995–96
4	Robert Barnes	901	1953–54
5	Greg Thurman	868	1991–92
6	Robert Barnes	849	1954–55
7	Al Allen	804	1994–95
8	DaQuinn Goff	771	1994–95
9	Kerry West	711	1994–95
	Bernard Childress	711	1977–78

Single Game
Rk	Player	Points	Season	Opponent
1	Joe Behling	58	1988–89	Lipscomb

== Rebounds ==
Career
Rk	Player	Rebounds	Seasons
1	Joe Gaines	1895	1968–69 1969–70 1970–71 1971–72
2	Robert Barnes	1123	1953–54 1954–55 1955–56
3	Dylan Windler	1,001	2015–16 2016–17 2017–18 2018–19
4	DaQuinn Goff	969	1993–94 1994–95 1995–96
5	Joe Behling	947	1986–87 1987–88 1988–89 1989–90
6	Hilton Jones	938	1953–54 1954–55 1955–56
7	Reggie Little	928	1983–84 1984–85 1985–86 1986–87
8	Evan Bradds	920	2013–14 2014–15 2015–16 2016–17
9	Jerry Sullivan	912	1963–64 1964–65 1965–66
10	Grayson Murphy	822	2017–18 2018–19 2019–20 2020–21 2021–22

Season
Rk	Player	Rebounds	Season
1	Joe Gaines	578	1970–71
2	Joe Gaines	484	1971–72
3	Joe Gaines	458	1969–70
4	Robert Barnes	435	1954–55
5	Joe Gaines	375	1968–69
6	Robert Barnes	373	1953–54
7	Hilton Jones	363	1953–54
8	Dylan Windler	359	2018–19
9	Adam Sonn	352	2002–03
10	DaQuinn Goff	350	1995–96

Single Game
Rk	Player	Rebounds	Season	Opponent
1	Joe Gaines	30	1969–70	Lipscomb
	Jerry Sullivan	30		Bethel

== Assists ==
Career
Rk	Player	Assists	Seasons
1	Scott Speedy	1164	1987–88 1988–89 1989–90 1990–91
2	Grayson Murphy	775	2017–18 2018–19 2019–20 2020–21 2021–22
3	Kerry West	745	1992–93 1993–94 1994–95 1995–96
4	Austin Luke	681	2014–15 2015–16 2016–17 2017–18
5	Casey Alexander	582	1991–92 1992–93 1993–94 1994–95
6	Kerron Johnson	515	2009–10 2010–11 2011–12 2012–13
7	Scott Corley	511	1986–87 1987–88 1988–89 1989–90
8	Tony McFadden	500	1989–90 1990–91 1991–92 1992–93
9	Tommy Dalley	499	1990–91 1991–92 1993–94
10	Ronnie Spurlock	480	1973–74 1974–75 1975–76 1976–77

Season
Rk	Player	Assists	Season
1	Scott Speedy	327	1988–89
2	Scott Speedy	314	1989–90
3	Scott Speedy	279	1990–91
4	Tommy Dalley	278	1991–92
5	Ronnie Spurlock	266	1974–75
6	Casey Alexander	250	1994–95
7	Austin Luke	246	2017–18
8	Scott Speedy	244	1987–88
9	Kerry West	220	1995–96
10	Austin Luke	214	2016–17
	Grayson Murphy	214	2018–19

Single Game
Rk	Player	Assists	Season	Opponent
1	Tommy Dalley	17	1991–92	Christian Bros.
	Scott Speedy	17	1988–89	Lincoln Memorial

== Steals ==
Career
Rk	Player	Steals	Seasons
1	Kerry West	284	1992–93 1993–94 1994–95 1995–96
2	Grayson Murphy	281	2017–18 2018–19 2019–20 2020–21 2021–22
3	Scott Corley	244	1986–87 1987–88 1988–89 1989–90
4	DaQuinn Goff	217	1993–94 1994–95 1995–96
5	Casey Alexander	215	1991–92 1992–93 1993–94 1994–95
6	Scott Speedy	214	1987–88 1988–89 1989–90 1990–91
7	J.J. Mann	208	2010–11 2011–12 2012–13 2013–14
8	Kerron Johnson	206	2009–10 2010–11 2011–12 2012–13
9	Brian Collins	178	2002–03 2003–04 2004–05 2005–06
10	Calvin Peters	172	1984–85 1985–86 1986–87 1987–88

Season
Rk	Player	Steals	Season
1	Kerry West	88	1994–95
2	Grayson Murphy	86	2019–20
3	Scott Corley	81	1989–90
4	Casey Alexander	80	1994–95
5	Kerry West	79	1995–96
6	J.J. Mann	77	2013–14
	Grayson Murphy	77	2021–22
8	Earl Coplen	75	1984–85
9	Andy Wicke	70	2008–09
	Kerron Johnson	70	2010–11

Single Game
Rk	Player	Steals	Season	Opponent
1	Kerron Johnson	9	2010–11	Kennesaw State

== Blocks ==
Career
Rk	Player	Blocks	Seasons
1	Shad Smith	281	1989–90 1990–91 1991–92 1992–93
2	Nick Muszynski	218	2018–19 2019–20 2020–21 2021–22
3	Joe Behling	142	1986–87 1987–88 1988–89 1989–90
4	Andrew Preston	123	2003–04 2004–05 2005–06 2006–07
5	Boomer Herndon	102	2005–06 2006–07
6	Dylan Windler	98	2015–16 2016–17 2017–18 2018–19
7	Jeff Bryan	95	1991–92 1992–93 1993–94 1994–95
8	Scott Saunders	85	2009–10 2010–11 2011–12
9	Mick Hedgepeth	78	2008–09 2009–10 2010–11 2011–12
10	Blake Jenkins	73	2010–11 2011–12 2012–13 2013–14

Season
Rk	Player	Blocks	Season
1	Shad Smith	86	1991–92
2	Shad Smith	76	1992–93
3	Nick Muszynski	70	2018–19
4	Shad Smith	66	1990–91
5	Joe Behling	58	1989–90
6	Andrew Preston	57	2004–05
7	Boomer Herndon	56	2005–06
8	Nick Muszynski	52	2019–20
	Nick Muszynski	52	2021–22
10	Mike Oliver	48	1967–68

Single Game
Rk	Player	Blocks	Season	Opponent
1	Boomer Herndon	8	2006–07	North Florida
