= 2005–06 Gonzaga Bulldogs men's basketball team =

American college basketball season

2005–06 Gonzaga Bulldogs men's basketball

WCC Regular Season Champions WCC tournament champions

NCAA tournament, Sweet Sixteen
- Conference: West Coast Conference

Ranking
- Coaches: No. 10
- AP: No. 5
- Record: 29–4 (14–0 WCC)
- Head coach: Mark Few (7th season)
- Assistant coaches: Bill Grier (15th season); Leon Rice (7th season); Tommy Lloyd (5th season)
- Home arena: McCarthey Athletic Center

2005–06 West Coast Conference men's basketball standings
	Conf.				Overall
Team	W		L	PCT	W		L	PCT
No. 5 Gonzaga †	14	–	0	1.000	29	–	4	.879
Loyola Marymount	8	–	6	.571	12	–	18	.400
Saint Mary's	8	–	6	.571	17	–	12	.586
San Francisco	7	–	7	.500	11	–	17	.393
San Diego	6	–	8	.429	18	–	12	.600
Santa Clara	5	–	9	.357	13	–	16	.448
Portland	5	–	9	.357	11	–	18	.379
Pepperdine	3	–	11	.214	7	–	20	.259
† 2006 WCC tournament winner Rankings from AP Poll

The 2005–06 Gonzaga Bulldogs men's basketball team represented Gonzaga University in the NCAA men's Division I competition.

== Preseason ==
=== Departures ===
Name	Number	Pos.	Height	Weight	Year	Hometown	Reason for departure
Brian Michaelson	14	G	6'4"	196	Senior (Redshirt)	Portland, OR	Graduated
Ronny Turiaf	1	F	6'10"	249	Senior	Le Robert, Martinique	Graduated; Entered 2005 NBA draft
Calum MacLeod	33	C	7'1"	228	Freshman (Redshirt)	Wellington, New Zealand	Transferred to Northeastern JC

=== Incoming transfers ===
Name	Pos.	Height	Weight	Year	Hometown	Previous School	Years Remaining	Date Eligible
Mamery Diallo	F	6'9"	235	Junior	Evreux, France	Midland College	2	Oct. 1, 2005
David Burgess	F	6'10"	250	Freshman (Redshirt)	Irvine, CA	BYU	2.5	Dec. 16, 2006
Micah Downs	G	6'8"	200	Freshman	Kirkland, WA	Kansas	2.5	Dec. 16, 2006

=== 2005 Recruiting Class ===
College recruiting information
Name	Hometown	School	Height	Weight	Commit date
Larry Guarganious; SF	Berkeley, CA	Saint Mary's	6 ft 5 in (1.96 m)	195 lb (88 kg)	Aug 8, 2004
Larry Guarganious; SF	Recruit ratings: Scout: Rivals:				
Jeremy Pargo; PG	Chicago, IL	Robeson	6 ft 2 in (1.88 m)	215 lb (98 kg)	Nov 17, 2004
Jeremy Pargo; PG	Recruit ratings: Scout: Rivals:				
Jordan Mast; G	Hillsboro, OR	Jesuit	6 ft 2 in (1.88 m)	180 lb (82 kg)	
Jordan Mast; G	Recruit ratings: Scout: Rivals:				
Overall recruit ranking: Scout: NR Rivals: NR ESPN: NR
Note: In many cases, Scout, Rivals, 247Sports, On3, and ESPN may conflict in their listings of height and weight.; In these cases, the average was taken. ESPN grades are on a 100-point scale.; Sources: "2005 Gonzaga Rivals Commits". Rivals.; "2005 Gonzaga Scout Commits". Scout.; "2005 Gonzaga ESPN Commits". ESPN.; "Scout.com Team Recruiting Rankings". Scout.; "2005 Team Ranking". Rivals.; "2005–06 Gonzaga Bulldogs men's basketball team". 247Sports.

== Roster ==
2005–06 Gonzaga Bulldogs men's basketball team
Players
Coaches

Pos.	#	Name	Height	Weight	Year	Previous school	Hometown
F	13	J.P. Batista	6 ft 9 in (2.06 m)	269 lb (122 kg)	RS Sr	Colegio Atual; Western Nebraska CC; Barton County CC	Pernambuco, Brazil
G	11	Nathan Doudney	6 ft 4 in (1.93 m)	208 lb (94 kg)	RS Sr	Rockwall; Texas Tech	Rockwall, TX
G	22	Erroll Knight	6 ft 7 in (2.01 m)	211 lb (96 kg)	RS Sr	Chief Sealth; Washington	Seattle, WA
G	15	Colin Floyd (W)	6 ft 1 in (1.85 m)	201 lb (91 kg)	RS Sr	Sprague-Harrington	Harrington, WA
G	24	Stephen Gentry (W)	6 ft 2 in (1.88 m)	175 lb (79 kg)	RS Sr	Fort Scott	Fort Scott, KS
F	32	Sean Mallon	6 ft 9 in (2.06 m)	218 lb (99 kg)	RS Jr	Ferris	Spokane, WA
C	34	Mamery Diallo	6 ft 9 in (2.06 m)	235 lb (107 kg)	Jr	Technique ALM; Midland College	Evreux, France
F	3	Adam Morrison	6 ft 8 in (2.03 m)	205 lb (93 kg)	Jr	Mead	Spokane, WA
G	5	Derek Raivio	6 ft 3 in (1.91 m)	175 lb (79 kg)	Jr	Mountain View	Vancouver, WA
G	25	David Pendergraft	6 ft 6 in (1.98 m)	175 lb (79 kg)	So	Brewster	Brewster, WA
G	4	Pierre Marie Altidor-Cespedes	6 ft 0 in (1.83 m)	181 lb (82 kg)	So	St. Champlain St.-Lambert	Montreal, QC
F	33	David Burgess (I) (redshirt)	6 ft 10 in (2.08 m)	250 lb (113 kg)	RS Fr	Woodbridge; BYU	Irvine, CA
F	42	Josh Heytvelt	6 ft 11 in (2.11 m)	217 lb (98 kg)	RS Fr	Clarkston	Clarkston, WA
G	23	Micah Downs (I, W) (redshirt)	6 ft 8 in (2.03 m)	200 lb (91 kg)	Fr	Juanita; Kansas	Kirkland, WA
G	2	Jeremy Pargo	6 ft 2 in (1.88 m)	215 lb (98 kg)	Fr	Robeson	Chicago, IL
F	20	Larry Gurganious	6 ft 5 in (1.96 m)	195 lb (88 kg)	Fr	Saint Mary's	Berkeley, CA
G	13	Jordan Mast (W) (redshirt)	6 ft 2 in (1.88 m)	180 lb (82 kg)	Fr	Jesuit	Hillsboro, OR

Head coach

- Mark Few

Assistant coach(es)

- Bill Grier
- Leon Rice
- Tommy Lloyd

Legend

- (C) Team captain
- (S) Suspended
- (I) Ineligible
- (W) Walk-on
- Injured
- Current redshirt

Roster
Last update: 2010-3-14

== Schedule ==
Date time, TV	Rank^{#}	Opponent^{#}	Result	Record	Site (attendance) city, state
Regular Season
11/18/2005*; 5:00 pm, KAYU	No. 9	Idaho	W 69–60	1–0	McCarthey Athletic Center (6,000); Spokane, WA
11/21/2005*; 2:00 pm, ESPN2	No. 8	vs. No. 23 Maryland; Maui Invitational – quarterfinals	W 88–76	2–0	Lahaina Civic Center (2,400); Maui, HI
11/22/2005*; 4:00 pm, ESPN	No. 8	vs. No. 12 Michigan State; Maui Invitational – semifinals	W 109–106 ^{3OT}	3–0	Lahaina Civic Center (2,400); Maui, HI
11/23/2005*; 6:30 pm, ESPN	No. 8	vs. No. 3 Connecticut; Maui Invitational – finals	L 65–63	3–1	Lahaina Civic Center (2,400); Maui, HI
11/30/2005*; 5:00 pm, KAYU	No. 6	Portland State	W 89–80	4–1	McCarthey Athletic Center (6,000); Spokane, WA
12/04/2005*; 7:30 pm, FSN	No. 6	at No. 18 Washington	L 99–95	4–2	Bank of America Arena (10,000); Seattle, WA
12/08/2005*; 6:00 pm, FSN	No. 9	Washington State	W 67–53	5–2	McCarthey Athletic Center (6,000); Spokane, WA
12/10/2005*; 12:00 pm, CBS	No. 9	vs. Oklahoma State; Battle in Seattle	W 64–62	6–2	KeyArena (13,644); Seattle, WA
12/17/2005*; 5:00 pm, KHQ-TV	No. 10	Virginia	W 80–69	7–2	McCarthey Athletic Center (6,000); Spokane, WA
12/19/2005*; 5:00 pm, KHQ-TV	No. 8	Eastern Washington	W 75–65	8–2	Spokane Arena (11,879); Spokane, WA
12/22/2005*; 5:00 pm, KHQ-TV	No. 8	at Saint Louis	W 60–57	9–2	Scottrade Center (15,707); St. Louis, MO
12/27/2005*; 4:00 pm, ESPN2	No. 8	at No. 4 Memphis	L 83–72	9–3	FedEx Forum (18,208); Memphis, TN
12/31/2005*; 3:00 pm, ESPN2	No. 8	St. Joseph's	W 102–94	10–3	McCarthey Athletic Center (6,000); Spokane, WA
01/07/2006; 8:00 pm, ESPNU	No. 8	at St. Mary's	W 68–60	11–3 (1–0)	McKeon Pavilion (3,500); Moraga, CA
01/09/2006; 8:00 pm, ESPN2	No. 6	at Santa Clara	W 81–68	12–3 (2–0)	Leavey Center (4,500); Santa Clara, CA
01/14/2006; 8:00 pm, ESPNU	No. 6	Pepperdine	W 102–73	13–3 (3–0)	McCarthey Athletic Center (6,000); Spokane, WA
01/16/2006; 8:59 pm, ESPN	No. 6	Loyola Marymount	W 92–80	14–3 (4–0)	McCarthey Athletic Center (6,000); Spokane, WA
01/21/2006; 3:00 pm, KHQ-TV	No. 6	at San Diego	W 64–63	15–3 (5–0)	Jenny Craig Pavilion (5,100); San Diego, CA
01/23/2006; 8:00 pm, PAX	No. 7	at San Francisco	W 84–75	16–3 (6–0)	War Memorial Gymnasium (5,300); San Francisco, CA
01/28/2006; 5:00 pm, KHQ-TV	No. 7	Portland	W 81–64	17–3 (7–0)	McCarthey Athletic Center (6,000); Spokane, WA
02/04/2006; 8:00 pm, KHQ-TV	No. 5	Santa Clara	W 85–71	18–3 (8–0)	McCarthey Athletic Center (6,000); Spokane, WA
02/07/2006; 9:00 pm, ESPN2	No. 5	St. Mary's	W 62–61	19–3 (9–0)	McCarthey Athletic Center (6,000); Spokane, WA
02/11/2006*; 6:00 pm, ESPN	No. 5	Stanford; College GameDay	W 80–76	20–3	McCarthey Athletic Center (6,000); Spokane, WA
02/13/2006; 7:00 pm, KREM	No. 5	at Portland	W 97–83	21–3 (10–0)	Chiles Center (4,574); Portland, OR
02/18/2006; 3:00 pm, ABC	No. 5	at Loyola Marymount	W 79–70	22–3 (11–0)	Gersten Pavilion (4,482); Los Angeles, CA
02/21/2006; 9:00 pm, ESPN2	No. 5	at Pepperdine	W 81–71	23–3 (12–0)	Firestone Fieldhouse (3,217); Malibu, CA
02/25/2006; 5:00 pm, KHQ-TV	No. 5	San Diego	W 75–59	24–3 (13–0)	McCarthey Athletic Center (6,000); Spokane, WA
02/27/2006; 6:00 pm, KAYU	No. 5	San Francisco	W 75–72	25–3 (14–0)	McCarthey Athletic Center (6,000); Spokane, WA
2006 West Coast Conference tournament
03/05/2006; 5:00 pm, ESPN2	No. 5	San Diego; Semifinals	W 96–92 ^{OT}	26–3	McCarthey Athletic Center; Spokane, WA
03/06/2006; 6:00 pm, ESPN	No. 4	Loyola Marymount; Championship	W 68–67	27–3	McCarthey Athletic Center (6,000); Spokane, WA
NCAA Division I men's basketball tournament
03/16/2006*; 4:20 pm, CBS	(3 OAK) No. 5	vs. (14 OAK) Xavier; First Round	W 79–75	28–3	Jon M. Huntsman Center; Salt Lake City, UT
03/18/2006*; 5:00 pm, CBS	(3 OAK) No. 5	vs. (6 OAK) Indiana; Second Round	W 90–80	29–3	Jon M. Huntsman Center (15,122); Salt Lake City, UT
03/23/2006*; 6:00 pm, CBS	(3 OAK) No. 5	vs. (2 OAK) No. 7 UCLA; Sweet Sixteen	L 73–71	29–4	Oakland Arena (19,596); Oakland, CA
*Non-conference game. ^{#}Rankings from AP Poll. (#) Tournament seedings in parentheses. OAK=Oakland. All times are in Pacific Time.
