= 2005–06 Stanford Cardinal men's basketball team =

American college basketball season

2005–06 Stanford Cardinal men's basketball

2006 National Invitation Tournament, first round
- Conference: Pacific-10 Conference
- Record: 16–14 (11–7 Pac-10)
- Head coach: Trent Johnson (2nd season)
- Assistant coaches: Eric Reveno(associate HC); Doug Oliver; Donny Guerinoni; Nick Robinson
- Home arena: Maples Pavilion (Capacity: 7,233)

2005–06 Pacific-10 Conference men's basketball standings
	Conf.				Overall
Team	W		L	PCT	W		L	PCT
No. 2 UCLA †	14	–	4	.778	32	–	7	.821
No. 12 Washington	13	–	5	.722	26	–	7	.788
California	12	–	6	.667	20	–	11	.645
Arizona ^{1}	11	–	7	.611	20	–	13	.606
Stanford	11	–	7	.611	16	–	14	.533
USC	8	–	10	.444	17	–	13	.567
Oregon	7	–	11	.389	15	–	18	.455
Oregon State ^{1}	5	–	13	.278	13	–	18	.419
Arizona State	5	–	13	.278	11	–	17	.393
Washington State	4	–	14	.222	11	–	17	.393
† Conference tournament winner As of April 3, 2006; Rankings from Coaches Poll^{1} Holds tie-breaker

The 2005–06 Stanford Cardinal men's basketball team represented Stanford University in the 2005–06 NCAA Division I men's basketball season. It was Trent Johnson's second season with the Cardinal. They were a member of the Pacific-10 Conference.

== Previous season ==
The Cardinal finished Trent Johnson's first year achieving an overall record of 18–13 and an 11–7 record in conference play. Finishing a tie for third in the Pac-10 conference, the Cardinal defeated Washington State in the quarterfinals, only to lose in the semifinals to Washington.

The Cardinal earned a bid to the NCAA tournament as an 8 seed in the Austin Region. In their first, and only, game they faced against the #9 seed Mississippi State only to lose 93–70.

== Roster ==
2005–06 Stanford Cardinal men's basketball team
Players
Coaches

Pos.	#	Name	Height	Weight	Year	Previous school	Hometown
G	1	Mitch Johnson	6 ft 1 in (1.85 m)	185 lb (84 kg)	Fr	O'Dea High School	Seattle, WA
G	3	Carlton Weatherby	6 ft 1 in (1.85 m)	180 lb (82 kg)	RS Jr	Curtis Senior High School	Tacoma, WA
G	4	Anthony Goods	6 ft 3 in (1.91 m)	195 lb (88 kg)	Fr	Centennial High School	Corona, CA
G	11	Chris Hernandez	6 ft 2 in (1.88 m)	190 lb (86 kg)	Sr	Clovis West	Fresno, CA
F	15	Lawrence Hill	6 ft 8 in (2.03 m)	205 lb (93 kg)	Fr	Deer Valley High School	Glendale, AZ
G	20	Dan Grunfeld	6 ft 6 in (1.98 m)	220 lb (100 kg)	Sr	Nicolet High School	River Hills, WI
G	22	Kenny Brown	6 ft 1 in (1.85 m)	190 lb (86 kg)	RS Fr	Carroll Senior High School	Southlake, TX
F	31	Taj Finger	6 ft 8 in (2.03 m)	190 lb (86 kg)	So	Fox Lane High School	Mt. Kisco, NY
G	32	Jason Haas	6 ft 2 in (1.88 m)	190 lb (86 kg)	Sr	Blair Academy	Spring Mills, PA
F	44	Fred Washington	6 ft 5 in (1.96 m)	205 lb (93 kg)	Jr	Bishop Montgomery	Los Angeles, CA
F	52	Matt Haryasz	6 ft 11 in (2.11 m)	230 lb (104 kg)	Sr	Page High School (Page, Arizona)	Page, AR
C	55	Peter Prowitt	6 ft 10 in (2.08 m)	250 lb (113 kg)	So	The Potomac School	Arlington, VA

Head coach

- Trent Johnson (Boise State)

Assistant coach(es)

- Doug Oliver (San José State)
- Donny Guerinoni (Nevada)
- Nick Robinson (Stanford)

Legend

- (C) Team captain
- (S) Suspended
- (I) Ineligible
- (W) Walk-on
- Injured
- Current redshirt

Roster
Last update: November 21, 2024

== Schedule and results ==
Date time, TV	Rank^{#}	Opponent^{#}	Result	Record	Site (attendance) city, state
Exhibition
November 5, 2005*; 2:00 pm		Sonoma State	W 87-52	–	Maples Pavilion; Stanford, CA
November 12, 2005*; 1:00 pm		Cal Poly-Pomona	W 99-70	–	Maples Pavilion; Stanford, CA
Non-conference regular season
November 19, 2005*; 12:00 PM		UC Irvine	L 63-79	0-1	Maples Pavilion; Stanford, CA
November 23, 2005*; 4:00 PM, FSBA		San Francisco	W 71-56	1-1	Maples Pavilion; Stanford, CA
November 28, 2005*; 7:00 PM		Cal Poly	W 82-58	2-1	Maples Pavilion; Stanford, CA
December 2, 2005*; 7:35 PM		at Montana	L 69-88	2-2	Dahlberg Arena; Missoula, MT
December 4, 2005*; 4:00 PM		at UC Davis	W 68-64	2-3	The Pavilion at ARC; Davis, CA
December 17, 2005*; 9:30 PM, ESPN		vs. Virginia Tech; Las Vegas Showdown	L 52-59	2-4	Thomas & Mack Center; Las Vegas, NV
December 19, 2005*; 7:00 PM, FSBA		Denver; Las Vegas Showdown	W 71-49	3-4	Maples Pavilion; Stanford, CA
December 21, 2005*; 5:30PM, CSTV		Princeton; Pete Newell Challenge	W 58-34	4-4	The Arena in Oakland; Oakland, CA
December 29, 2005; 7:30 PM, FSN		at No. 11 UCLA	L 54-71	4-5 (0-1)	Pauley Pavilion; Los Angeles, CA
December 31, 2005; 1:00 PM		at USC	L 71-82	4-6 (0-2)	Los Angeles Memorial Sports Arena; Los Angeles, CA
January 5, 2006; 7:00 PM		Oregon State	W 80-66	5-6 (1-2)	Maples Pavilion; Stanford, CA
January 7, 2006; 1:00 PM, FSBA		Oregon	W 64-62	6-6 (2-2)	Maples Pavilion; Stanford, CA
January 13, 2006; 7:00 PM, FSBA		California	W 75-61	7-6 (3-2)	Maples Pavilion; Stanford, CA
January 19, 2006; 8:30 PM, FSN		Arizona	L 81-90 ^{OT}	7-7 (3-3)	McKale Center; Tucson, AZ
January 21, 2006; 6:30 PM		Arizona State	W 70-64	8-7 (4-3)	Weels Fargo Arena; Tempe, AZ
January 26, 2006; 7:00 PM		Washington State	W 69-59	9-7 (5-3)	Maples Pavilion; Stanford, CA
January 29, 2006; 5:00 PM, FSN		No. 10 Washington	W 76-67 ^{OT}	10-7 (6-3)	Maples Pavilion; Stanford, CA
February 2, 2006; 5:30 PM		at Oregon	W 57-56	11-7 (7-3)	McArthur Court; Eugene, OR
February 4, 2006; 5:00 PM		at Oregon State	W 71-64	12-7 (8-3)	Gill Coliseum; Corvallis, OR
February 9, 2006; 7:30 PM, FSN		at California	L 62-65	12-8 (8-4)	Haas Pavilion; Berkeley, CA
February 11, 2006*; 6:00 PM, ESPN		No. 5 Gonzaga	L 76-80	12-9	McCarthey Athletic Center; Spokane, WA
February 16, 2006; 7:00 PM		Arizona State	W 82-69	13-9 (9-4)	Maples Pavilion; Stanford, CA
February 19, 2006; 12:30 PM, CBS		Arizona	L 72-76	13-10 (9-5)	Maples Pavilion; Stanford, CA
February 23, 2006; 7:30 PM, FSN		at No. 17 Washington	L 57-75	13-11 (9-6)	Hec Edmundson Pavilion (10,000); Seattle, WA
February 25, 2006; 4:00 PM, ABC		at Washington State	W 39-37	14-11 (10-6)	Beasley Coliseum; Pullman, WA
March 2, 2006; 7:00 PM		USC	W 58-56	15-11 (11-6)	Maples Pavilion; Stanford, CA
March 4, 2006; 1:00 PM, CBS		No. 15 UCLA	L 54-75	15-12 (11-7)	Maples Pavilion; Stanford, CA
Pac-10 tournament
March 9, 2006; 12:20, FSN	(5)	vs. (4) Arizona; Quarterfinals	L 68-73	15-13	Staples Center; Los Angeles, CA
NIT
March 14, 2006*; 6:30 pm	No. (7)	(8) Virginia; Opening Round	W 65-49	16-13	Maples Pavilion (2,519); Stanford, CA
March 17, 2006*; 8:30 pm	No. (7)	(2) Missouri State; First round	L 67-76	16-14	Hammons Student Center (5,664); Springfield, MO
*Non-conference game. ^{#}Rankings from AP Poll. (#) Tournament seedings in parentheses. All times are in Pacific Time.
