= 2006 SWAC men's basketball tournament =

Basketball Tournament March 2004 in Alabama

- Classification: Division I
- Season: 2005–06
- Teams: 8
- Site: Bill Harris Arena; Birmingham, Alabama
- Champions: Southern (7th title)
- Winning coach: Rob Spivery (3rd title)

2005–06 SWAC men's basketball standings
	Conf.				Overall
Team	W		L	PCT	W		L	PCT
Southern †	15	–	3	.833	20	–	13	.606
Grambling State	11	–	7	.611	14	–	13	.519
Alabama A&M	11	–	7	.611	13	–	13	.500
Jackson State	10	–	8	.556	15	–	17	.469
Alabama State	10	–	8	.556	12	–	18	.400
Mississippi Valley State	9	–	9	.500	9	–	19	.321
Arkansas–Pine Bluff	8	–	10	.444	13	–	16	.448
Alcorn State	8	–	10	.444	8	–	20	.286
Texas Southern	6	–	12	.333	8	–	22	.267
Prairie View A&M	2	–	16	.111	5	–	24	.172
† 2006 SWAC tournament winner Rankings from AP Poll

The 2006 SWAC men's basketball tournament was held March 9–11, 2006, at Bill Harris Arena in Birmingham, Alabama. Southern defeated Arkansas–Pine Bluff, 57–44 in the championship game. The Jaguars received the conference's automatic bid to the 2006 NCAA tournament as No. 16 seed in the Atlanta Region.

== Bracket and results ==
Quarterfinals; March 9
1	Southern	73
8	Alcorn State	52
4	Alabama State	65
5	Jackson State	83
3	Grambling State	50
6	Mississippi Valley State	49
2	Alabama A&M	54
7	Arkansas–Pine Bluff	64

Semifinals; March 10
1	Southern	66
5	Jackson State	59
3	Grambling	49
7	Arkansas–Pine Bluff	61

Final; March 11
1	Southern	57
7	Arkansas–Pine Bluff	44
