= 2006 West Coast Conference men's basketball tournament =

- Classification: Division I
- Season: 2005–06
- Teams: 8
- Site: McCarthey Athletic Center; Spokane, Washington
- Champions: Gonzaga (8th title)
- Winning coach: Mark Few (6th title)
- MVP: Adam Morrison (Gonzaga)
- Television: ESPN2, ESPN

2005–06 West Coast Conference men's basketball standings
	Conf.				Overall
Team	W		L	PCT	W		L	PCT
No. 5 Gonzaga †	14	–	0	1.000	29	–	4	.879
Loyola Marymount	8	–	6	.571	12	–	18	.400
Saint Mary's	8	–	6	.571	17	–	12	.586
San Francisco	7	–	7	.500	11	–	17	.393
San Diego	6	–	8	.429	18	–	12	.600
Santa Clara	5	–	9	.357	13	–	16	.448
Portland	5	–	9	.357	11	–	18	.379
Pepperdine	3	–	11	.214	7	–	20	.259
† 2006 WCC tournament winner Rankings from AP Poll

The 2006 West Coast Conference men's basketball tournament took place March 3–6, 2006. All rounds were held in Spokane, Washington at the McCarthey Athletic Center. The semifinals were televised by ESPN2. The West Coast Conference Championship Game was televised by ESPN.

The Gonzaga Bulldogs earned their third straight (eighth overall) WCC Tournament title and an automatic bid to the 2006 NCAA tournament. Adam Morrison of Gonzaga was named Tournament MVP for the second straight year.

== Bracket ==
* – Denotes overtime period

First round Friday, March 3
5	San Diego	85
8	Pepperdine	72
6	Santa Clara	72
7	Portland	68

Quarter finals Saturday, March 4
4	San Francisco	59
5	San Diego	62
3	Saint Mary's	76
6	Santa Clara	72

Semi-finals; Sunday, March 5
1	#5 Gonzaga	96*
5	San Diego	92
2	Loyola Marymount	66
3	Saint Mary's	63

Finals; Monday, March 6
1	#4 Gonzaga	68
2	Loyola Marymount	67

== See also ==
- West Coast Conference
