= 2005–06 California Golden Bears men's basketball team =

American college basketball season

2005–06 California Golden Bears men's basketball

NCAA tournament, first round
- Conference: Pacific-10 Conference
- Record: 20–11 (12–6 Pac-10)
- Head coach: Ben Braun (10th season)
- Assistant coach: Joe Pasternack (5th season)
- Home arena: Haas Pavilion

2005–06 Pacific-10 Conference men's basketball standings
	Conf.				Overall
Team	W		L	PCT	W		L	PCT
No. 2 UCLA †	14	–	4	.778	32	–	7	.821
No. 12 Washington	13	–	5	.722	26	–	7	.788
California	12	–	6	.667	20	–	11	.645
Arizona ^{1}	11	–	7	.611	20	–	13	.606
Stanford	11	–	7	.611	16	–	14	.533
USC	8	–	10	.444	17	–	13	.567
Oregon	7	–	11	.389	15	–	18	.455
Oregon State ^{1}	5	–	13	.278	13	–	18	.419
Arizona State	5	–	13	.278	11	–	17	.393
Washington State	4	–	14	.222	11	–	17	.393
† Conference tournament winner As of April 3, 2006; Rankings from Coaches Poll^{1} Holds tie-breaker

The 2005–06 California Golden Bears men's basketball team represented the University of California, Berkeley in the 2005–06 NCAA Division I men's basketball season. This was head coach Ben Braun's tenth season at California. The Golden Bears played their home games at Haas Pavilion and participated in the Pacific-10 Conference. The Golden Bears finished the season 20–11, 12–6 in Pac-10 play to finish in third place. They lost to UCLA in the championship game of the Pac-10 tournament. They received an at–large bid to the 2006 NCAA Division I men's basketball tournament, earning a 7 seed in the South region. They were beaten by 10 seed NC State in the first round.

== Roster ==
2005–06 California Golden Bears men's basketball team
Players
Coaches

Pos.	#	Name	Height	Weight	Year	Previous school	Hometown
F	0	Rod Benson	6 ft 10 in (2.08 m)	220 lb (100 kg)	Sr	Torrey Pines HS	San Diego
G	1	Ayinde Ubaka	6 ft 4 in (1.93 m)	200 lb (91 kg)	Jr	Oakland HS	Oakland, California
G	2	Omar Wilkes	6 ft 4 in (1.93 m)	185 lb (84 kg)	RS So	Loyola HS	Los Angeles
G	12	Steve Panawek (W)	6 ft 6 in (1.98 m)	205 lb (93 kg)	Jr	Miramonte HS	Moraga, California
G	13	Nikola Knezevic	6 ft 2 in (1.88 m)	190 lb (86 kg)	Fr	Belgrade, Serbia
F	14	Eric Vierneisel	6 ft 7 in (2.01 m)	205 lb (93 kg)	So	Jacobs HS	Algonquin, Illinois
G	15	Richard Midgley	6 ft 3 in (1.91 m)	195 lb (88 kg)	Sr	Modesto Christian HS	Burgess Hill, England
G	20	Martin Smith	6 ft 1 in (1.85 m)	175 lb (79 kg)	Sr	The Bishop's School	Escondido, California
F	24	Theo Robertson	6 ft 5 in (1.96 m)	240 lb (109 kg)	Fr	De La Salle	Pittsburg, California
G	31	Alex Pribble	6 ft 4 in (1.93 m)	215 lb (98 kg)	Jr	Drake HS	Fairfax, California
G	32	Ivan Kovacevic (W)	6 ft 6 in (1.98 m)	210 lb (95 kg)	Fr	Laguna Beach HS	Laguna Beach, California
C	33	Jordan Wilkes	6 ft 11 in (2.11 m)	225 lb (102 kg)	Fr	Loyola HS	Los Angeles
C	35	DeVon Hardin	6 ft 11 in (2.11 m)	250 lb (113 kg)	So	Memorial	Newark, California
F	44	Leon Powe	6 ft 8 in (2.03 m)	240 lb (109 kg)	RS So	Oakland Tech	Oakland, California

Head coach

- Ben Braun

Assistant coach(es)

- Dennis Gates
- Joe Pasternack

Legend

- (C) Team captain
- (S) Suspended
- (I) Ineligible
- (W) Walk-on
- Injured
- Current redshirt

Roster
Last update: 12 March 2025

== Schedule and results ==
Date time, TV	Rank^{#}	Opponent^{#}	Result	Record	Site (attendance) city, state
Non-conference regular season
Nov 18, 2005*		at Eastern Michigan	L 65–67	0–1	Convocation Center (3,165); Ypsilanti, Michigan
Nov 21, 2005*		Long Beach State	W 88–69	1–1	Haas Pavilion (7,286); Berkeley, California
Nov 25, 2005*		Northern Colorado; Golden Bear Classic	W 83–59	2–1	Haas Pavilion (7,991); Berkeley, California
Nov 26, 2005*		Northeastern; Golden Bear Classic	W 83–73	3–1	Haas Pavilion (7,990); Berkeley, California
Nov 30, 2005*		San Jose State	W 70–52	4–1	Haas Pavilion (8,138); Berkeley, California
Dec 3, 2005*		Akron	W 89–75	5–1	Haas Pavilion (7,820); Berkeley, California
Dec 6, 2005*		San Diego State	W 82–64	6–1	Haas Pavilion (8,679); Berkeley, California
Dec 10, 2005*		vs. Kansas	L 56–69	6–2	Kemper Arena (16,180); Kansas City, Missouri
Dec 21, 2005*		vs. DePaul; Pete Newell Challenge	L 65–68	6–3	The Arena in Oakland (8,426); Oakland, California
Pac-10 regular season
Dec 29, 2005		at USC	W 62–58	7–3 (1–0)	L.A. Sports Arena (5,239); Los Angeles, California
Dec 31, 2005		at No. 11 UCLA	W 68–61	8–3 (2–0)	Pauley Pavilion (10,129); Los Angeles, California
Jan 5, 2006		Oregon	W 77–66	9–3 (3–0)	Haas Pavilion (8,862); Berkeley, California
Jan 7, 2006		Oregon State	L 64–72	9–4 (3–1)	Haas Pavilion (8,956); Berkeley, California
Jan 13, 2006		at Stanford	L 61–75	9–5 (3–2)	Maples Pavilion (7,598); Stanford, California
Jan 19, 2006		at Arizona State	W 88–58	10–5 (4–2)	Wells Fargo Arena (7,521); Tempe, Arizona
Jan 21, 2006		at Arizona	L 55–60	10–6 (4–3)	McKale Center (14,621); Tucson, Arizona
Jan 26, 2006		No. 10 Washington	W 71–69	11–6 (5–3)	Haas Pavilion (8,957); Berkeley, California
Jan 28, 2006		Washington State	W 55–53	12–6 (6–3)	Haas Pavilion (8,479); Berkeley, California
Feb 2, 2006		at Oregon State	W 69–52	13–6 (7–3)	Gill Coliseum (5,982); Corvallis, Oregon
Feb 4, 2006		at Oregon	W 62–60	14–6 (8–3)	McArthur Court (9,087); Eugene, Oregon
Feb 9, 2006		Stanford	W 65–62	15–6 (9–3)	Haas Pavilion (11,877); Berkeley, California
Feb 16, 2006		Arizona	W 75–66	16–6 (10–3)	Haas Pavilion (11,175); Berkeley, California
Feb 18, 2006		Arizona State	L 64–65 ^{2OT}	16–7 (10–4)	Haas Pavilion (10,075); Berkeley, California
Feb 23, 2006		at Washington State	W 43–41	17–7 (11–4)	Beasley Coliseum (3,021); Pullman, Washington
Feb 26, 2006		at No. 17 Washington	L 62–73	17–8 (11–5)	Bank of America Arena (10,000); Seattle, Washington
Mar 2, 2006		No. 15 UCLA	L 58–67 ^{OT}	17–9 (11–6)	Haas Pavilion (11,877); Berkeley, California
Mar 4, 2006		USC	W 71–60	18–9 (12–6)	Haas Pavilion (11,702); Berkeley, California
Pac-10 tournament
Mar 9, 2006*		at USC; Quarterfinals	W 82–67	19–9	Staples Center; Los Angeles, California
Mar 10, 2006*		vs. Oregon; Semifinals	W 91–87 ^{2OT}	20–9	Staples Center (17,856); Los Angeles, California
Mar 11, 2006*		vs. No. 13 UCLA; Championship game	L 52–71	20–10	Staples Center (18,544); Los Angeles, California
NCAA tournament
Mar 17, 2006*; CBS	(7 S)	vs. (10 S) NC State; First round	L 52–58	20–11	American Airlines Center (19,263); Dallas, Texas
*Non-conference game. ^{#}Rankings from AP poll. (#) Tournament seedings in parentheses. S=South. All times are in Pacific.
