= 2005–06 Southern Jaguars basketball team =

American college basketball season

2005–06 Southern Jaguars basketball

SWAC regular season and tournament champions

NCAA tournament, First round
- Conference: Southwestern Athletic Conference
- Record: 20–13 (15–3 SWAC)
- Head coach: Rob Spivery (1st season)
- Home arena: F. G. Clark Center

2005–06 SWAC men's basketball standings
	Conf.				Overall
Team	W		L	PCT	W		L	PCT
Southern †	15	–	3	.833	20	–	13	.606
Grambling State	11	–	7	.611	14	–	13	.519
Alabama A&M	11	–	7	.611	13	–	13	.500
Jackson State	10	–	8	.556	15	–	17	.469
Alabama State	10	–	8	.556	12	–	18	.400
Mississippi Valley State	9	–	9	.500	9	–	19	.321
Arkansas–Pine Bluff	8	–	10	.444	13	–	16	.448
Alcorn State	8	–	10	.444	8	–	20	.286
Texas Southern	6	–	12	.333	8	–	22	.267
Prairie View A&M	2	–	16	.111	5	–	24	.172
† 2006 SWAC tournament winner Rankings from AP Poll

The 2005–06 Southern Jaguars basketball team represented Southern University during the 2005–06 NCAA Division I men's basketball season. The Jaguars, led by first-year head coach Rob Spivery, played their home games at the F. G. Clark Center and were members of the Southwestern Athletic Conference. They finished the season 20–13, 15–3 in SWAC play to finish atop the conference regular season standings. They were champions of the SWAC tournament to earn the conference's automatic bid to the NCAA tournament – the program's first appearance in 13 years. Playing as No. 16 seed in the Atlanta region, the Jaguars lost in the opening round to No. 1 seed Duke, 70–54.

== Roster ==
2005–06 Southern Jaguars men's basketball team
Players
Coaches

Pos.	#	Name	Height	Weight	Year	Hometown
G	10	Chris Alexander	6 ft 1 in (1.85 m)	185 lb (84 kg)	Sr	Lawton, Oklahoma
F	32	Peter Cipriano	6 ft 9 in (2.06 m)	225 lb (102 kg)	Sr	Jersey City, New Jersey

Head coach

- Rob Spivery

Assistant coach(es)

Legend

- (C) Team captain
- (S) Suspended
- (I) Ineligible
- (W) Walk-on
- Injured
- Current redshirt

Roster

== Schedule and results ==
Date time, TV	Rank^{#}	Opponent^{#}	Result	Record	Site (attendance) city, state
Non-conference regular season
Nov 15, 2005*; 7:30 p.m.		at No. 2 Texas; Guardians Classic First round	L 56–89	0–1	Frank Erwin Center (10,483); Austin, Texas
Nov 16, 2005*; 5:30 p.m.		vs. Sacramento State; Guardians Classic	L 64–67 ^{OT}	0–2	Frank Erwin Center (9,513); Austin, Texas
Nov 18, 2005*; 7:30 p.m.		at LSU	L 56–84	0–3	Pete Maravich Assembly Center (7,877); Baton Rouge, Louisiana
Nov 20, 2005*; 3:00 p.m.		at Texas A&M	L 44–88	0–4	Reed Arena (5,871); College Station, Texas
Nov 29, 2005*; 7:00 p.m.		Jarvis Christian	W 71–58	1–4	F. G. Clark Center (132); Baton Rouge, Louisiana
Dec 3, 2005*; 3:00 p.m.		at Louisiana Tech	L 52–61	1–5	Thomas Assembly Center (1,032); Ruston, Louisiana
Dec 5, 2005*; 7:00 p.m.		at Southeastern Louisiana	L 62–65	1–6	University Center (1,615); Hammond, Louisiana
Dec 10, 2005*; 7:00 p.m.		Louisiana Tech	W 63–47	2–6	F. G. Clark Center (217); Baton Rouge, Louisiana
Dec 17, 2005*; 7:00 p.m.		at No. 8 Oklahoma	L 54–68	2–7	Lloyd Noble Center (6,100); Norman, Oklahoma
Dec 19, 2005*; 7:05 p.m.		at Tulsa	L 48–60	2–8	Reynolds Center (4,770); Tulsa, Oklahoma
Dec 29, 2005*; 7:00 p.m.		at Xavier	L 56–73	2–9	Cintas Center (10,250); Cincinnati, Ohio
SWAC regular season
Jan 2, 2006; 7:30 p.m.		at Prairie View A&M	W 73–65	3–9 (1–0)	William J. Nicks Building (501); Prairie View, Texas
Jan 4, 2006; 7:30 p.m.		at Texas Southern	W 54–48	4–9 (2–0)	Health and Physical Education Arena; Houston, Texas
Jan 7, 2006; 8:00 p.m.		Grambling State	W 72–57	5–9 (3–0)	F. G. Clark Center (1,175); Baton Rouge, Louisiana
Jan 9, 2006; 7:30 p.m.		Jackson State	W 80–65	6–9 (4–0)	F. G. Clark Center (1,708); Baton Rouge, Louisiana
Jan 14, 2006; 7:30 p.m.		at Arkansas–Pine Bluff	W 60–50	7–9 (5–0)	K. L. Johnson Complex (1,286); Pine Bluff, Arkansas
Jan 16, 2006; 7:30 p.m.		at Mississippi Valley State	L 64–70	7–10 (5–1)	Harrison HPER Complex (997); Itta Bena, Mississippi
Jan 21, 2006; 3:00 p.m.		Alabama A&M	W 72–65	8–10 (6–1)	F. G. Clark Center (3,997); Baton Rouge, Louisiana
Jan 23, 2006; 7:30 p.m.		Alabama State	W 72–68 ^{OT}	9–10 (7–1)	F. G. Clark Center (1,357); Baton Rouge, Louisiana
Jan 28, 2006; 5:30 p.m.		Alcorn State	W 72–55	10–10 (8–1)	F. G. Clark Center (1,932); Baton Rouge, Louisiana
Feb 4, 2006; 7:30 p.m.		at Grambling State	L 75–80 ^{OT}	10–11 (8–2)	HPER Complex (2,400); Grambling, Louisiana
Feb 6, 2006; 7:30 p.m.		at Jackson State	W 70–58	11–11 (9–2)	Williams Assembly Center (2,679); Jackson, Mississippi
Feb 11, 2006; 3:00 p.m.		Arkansas–Pine Bluff	W 71–68	12–11 (10–2)	F. G. Clark Center (1,130); Baton Rouge, Louisiana
Feb 13, 2006; 7:30 p.m.		Mississippi Valley State	W 71–60	13–11 (11–2)	F. G. Clark Center (1,056); Baton Rouge, Louisiana
Feb 18, 2006; 7:30 p.m.		at Alabama A&M	W 84–80	14–11 (12–2)	Elmore Gymnasium (1,060); Normal, Alabama
Feb 20, 2006; 7:30 p.m.		at Alabama State	L 59–63	14–12 (12–3)	Dunn–Oliver Acadome (3,756); Montgomery, Alabama
Feb 25, 2006; 7:30 p.m.		at Alcorn State	W 69–57	15–12 (13–3)	Davey Whitney Complex (1,100); Lorman, Mississippi
Mar 2, 2006; 7:30 p.m.		Prairie View A&M	W 81–62	16–12 (14–3)	F. G. Clark Center (2,948); Baton Rouge, Louisiana
Mar 4, 2006; 4:00 p.m.		Texas Southern	W 89–64	17–12 (15–3)	F. G. Clark Center; Baton Rouge, Louisiana
SWAC tournament
Mar 9, 2006*; 7:30 p.m.	(1)	vs. (8) Alcorn State; Quarterfinals	W 73–52	18–12	Bill Harris Arena (932); Birmingham, Alabama
Mar 10, 2006*; 7:30 p.m.	(1)	vs. (5) Jackson State; Semifinals	W 66–59	19–12	Bill Harris Arena (1,259); Birmingham, Alabama
Mar 11, 2006*; 7:00 p.m.	(1)	vs. (7) Arkansas–Pine Bluff; Championship game	W 57–44	20–12	Bill Harris Arena (2,567); Birmingham, Alabama
NCAA tournament
Mar 16, 2006*; 9:30 p.m.	(16 A)	vs. (1 A) No. 1 Duke; First round	L 54–70	20–13	Greensboro Coliseum (22,642); Greensboro, North Carolina
*Non-conference game. ^{#}Rankings from AP Poll. (#) Tournament seedings in parentheses. A=Atlanta. All times are in Central Time.
