= 2006 Atlantic Sun men's basketball tournament =

- Classification: Division I
- Season: 2005–06
- Teams: 8
- Site: Memorial Center; Johnson City, TN
- Champions: Belmont (1st title)
- Winning coach: Rick Byrd (1st title)
- MVP: Justin Hare (Belmont)

2005–06 Atlantic Sun men's basketball standings
	Conf.				Overall
Team	W		L	PCT	W		L	PCT
Lipscomb	15	–	5	.750	21	–	11	.656
Belmont †	15	–	5	.750	20	–	11	.645
Florida Atlantic	14	–	6	.700	15	–	13	.536
Gardner–Webb	13	–	7	.650	17	–	12	.586
East Tennessee State	12	–	8	.600	15	–	13	.536
Stetson	11	–	9	.550	14	–	18	.438
Kennesaw State	10	–	10	.500	12	–	17	.414
Campbell	9	–	11	.450	10	–	18	.357
Mercer	7	–	13	.350	9	–	19	.321
North Florida	3	–	17	.150	6	–	22	.214
Jacksonville	1	–	19	.050	1	–	26	.037
† 2006 Atlantic Sun Tournament winner As of March 7, 2006; Rankings from AP Poll

The 2006 Atlantic Sun men's basketball tournament was held March 2–4, 2006 at the Memorial Center at East Tennessee State University in Johnson City, Tennessee.

Belmont defeated top-seeded rival Lipscomb in the championship game, 74–69, to clinch their first Atlantic Sun men's basketball tournament.

The Bruins, therefore, received the Atlantic Sun's automatic bid to the 2006 NCAA tournament. This was Belmont's first appearance in the Division I tournament.

== Format ==
The Atlantic Sun saw some significant membership changes prior to the 2005–06 season, even though the A-Sun remained fixed at 11 programs. Long-time member Georgia State departed for the CAA, Central Florida joined Conference USA, and Troy (formerly Troy State) left for the Sun Belt. Meanwhile, the conference added three new members: East Tennessee State (from the SoCon), Kennesaw State (from Division II), and North Florida (also from Division II).

Nonetheless, no changes were made to the tournament format. Only the top eight teams from the conference tournament were eligible for the tournament. These eight teams were seeded based on regular season conference records and were all entered into the quarterfinal round.

== Bracket ==
Quarterfinals; Thursday, March 2
1	Lipscomb	78
8	Mercer	62
5	East Tennessee State	63
4	Gardner–Webb	64
3	Florida Atlantic	44
6	Stetson	54
7	Campbell	76
2	Belmont	90

Semifinals; Friday, March 3
1	Lipscomb	70
4	Gardner–Webb	51
6	Stetson	59
2	Belmont	72

Championship; Saturday, March 4
1	Lipscomb	69
2	Belmont	74
