= 2005–06 Arizona Wildcats men's basketball team =

American college basketball season

2005–06 Arizona Wildcats men's basketball

NCAA Tournament, Round of 32
- Conference: Pacific-10 Conference
- Record: 20–13 (11–7 Pac-10)
- Head coach: Lute Olson (23rd season)
- Assistant coach: Jim Rosborough
- Home arena: McKale Center

2005–06 Pacific-10 Conference men's basketball standings
	Conf.				Overall
Team	W		L	PCT	W		L	PCT
No. 2 UCLA †	14	–	4	.778	32	–	7	.821
No. 12 Washington	13	–	5	.722	26	–	7	.788
California	12	–	6	.667	20	–	11	.645
Arizona ^{1}	11	–	7	.611	20	–	13	.606
Stanford	11	–	7	.611	16	–	14	.533
USC	8	–	10	.444	17	–	13	.567
Oregon	7	–	11	.389	15	–	18	.455
Oregon State ^{1}	5	–	13	.278	13	–	18	.419
Arizona State	5	–	13	.278	11	–	17	.393
Washington State	4	–	14	.222	11	–	17	.393
† Conference tournament winner As of April 3, 2006; Rankings from Coaches Poll^{1} Holds tie-breaker

The 2005–06 Arizona Wildcats men's basketball team represented the University of Arizona during the 2005–06 NCAA Division I men's basketball season. The Wildcats, led by head coach Lute Olson, played their home games at the McKale Center and are members of the Pacific-10 Conference.

== Recruiting class ==
College recruiting information
Name	Hometown	School	Height	Weight	Commit date
Fendi Onobun; SF	Houston, Texas	Taylor High School	6 ft 5 in (1.96 m)	215 lb (98 kg)	Apr 8, 2004
Fendi Onobun; SF	Recruit ratings: Scout: Rivals:				
J. P. Prince; PG	Memphis, Tennessee	White Station High School	6 ft 7 in (2.01 m)	183 lb (83 kg)	Oct 7, 2004
J. P. Prince; PG	Recruit ratings: Scout: Rivals:				
Marcus Williams; SF	Seattle, Washington	Roosevelt High School	6 ft 6 in (1.98 m)	190 lb (86 kg)	Sep 20, 2004
Marcus Williams; SF	Recruit ratings: Scout: Rivals:				
Overall recruit ranking: Scout: 9 Rivals: 14
Note: In many cases, Scout, Rivals, 247Sports, On3, and ESPN may conflict in their listings of height and weight.; In these cases, the average was taken. ESPN grades are on a 100-point scale.; Sources: "ESPN". ESPN.; "2005 Team Ranking". Rivals.

== Roster ==
2005–06 Arizona Wildcats men's basketball team
Players
Coaches

Pos.	#	Name	Height	Weight	Year	Hometown
F	1	Fendi Onobun	6 ft 6 in (1.98 m)	249 lb (113 kg)	Fr	Houston, Texas
F	2	Isaiah Fox	6 ft 9 in (2.06 m)	255 lb (116 kg)	Sr	Santa Monica, California
F	3	Marcus Williams	6 ft 7 in (2.01 m)	205 lb (93 kg)	Fr	Seattle, Washington
G	5	Jawann McClellan	6 ft 4 in (1.93 m)	204 lb (93 kg)	So	Houston, Texas
G	11	David Bagga	6 ft 4 in (1.93 m)	180 lb (82 kg)	Fr	Santa Ana, California
G	12	Daniel Dillon	6 ft 3 in (1.91 m)	197 lb (89 kg)	So	Melbourne, Victoria
G	13	Chris Rodgers	6 ft 4 in (1.93 m)	205 lb (93 kg)	Sr	Portland, Oregon
G	15	Mustafa Shakur	6 ft 3 in (1.91 m)	190 lb (86 kg)	Jr	Philadelphia, Pennsylvania
G	21	Hassan Adams	6 ft 4 in (1.93 m)	220 lb (100 kg)	Sr	Los Angeles, California
G	30	J.P. Prince	6 ft 7 in (2.01 m)	205 lb (93 kg)	Fr	Memphis, Tennessee
F	30	Matt Brase	6 ft 76 in (3.76 m)	225 lb (102 kg)	Sr	Tucson, Arizona
F	44	Bret Brielmaier	6 ft 7 in (2.01 m)	237 lb (108 kg)	So	Mankato, Minnesota
F	33	Mohamed Tangara	6 ft 8 in (2.03 m)	248 lb (112 kg)	Fr	Bamako, Mali
F	54	Kirk Walters	6 ft 11 in (2.11 m)	247 lb (112 kg)	Jr	Grand Rapids, Michigan
F	55	Ivan Radenovic	6 ft 10 in (2.08 m)	240 lb (109 kg)	Jr	Belgrade, Serbia

Head coach

- Lute Olson (Augsburg)

Assistant coach(es)

{{{asst_coach}}}

Legend

- (C) Team captain
- (S) Suspended
- (I) Ineligible
- (W) Walk-on
- Injured
- Current redshirt

Roster

=== Depth chart ===
Pos.	Starting 5	Bench 1	Bench 2
C	Kirk Walters	Bret Brielmaier	Isiah Fox
PF	Ivan Radenovic	Fendi Onobun	Mohamed Tangara
SF	Marcus Williams	J.P. Prince	Matt Brase
SG	Hassan Adams	Chris Rodgers	David Bagga
PG	Mustafa Shakur	Daniel Dillon	Juwann McClellan

== Schedule ==
Date time, TV	Rank^{#}	Opponent^{#}	Result	Record	Site (attendance) city, state
Regular season
11/21/05*; 7:00 pm, ESPN	No. 10	vs. Kansas; Maui Invitational Quarterfinal	W 61–49	1–0	Lahaina Civic Center (2,400); Maui, HI
11/22/05*; 8:30 pm, ESPN	No. 9	vs. No. 3 Connecticut; Maui Invitational Semifinal	L 70–79	1–1	Lahaina Civic Center (2,400); Maui, HI
11/23/05*; 2:30 pm, ESPN	No. 9	vs. No. 12 Michigan State; Maui Invitational 3rd Place Game	L 71–74 ^{OT}	1–2	Lahaina Civic Center (2,400); Maui, HI
11/27/05*; 5:00 pm, FSN	No. 9	Virginia	W 81–51	2–2	McKale Center (14,570); Tucson, AZ
12/3/05*; 5:00 pm, ESPN2	No. 15	at Houston	L 65–69	2–3	Hofheinz Pavilion (8,026); Houston, TX
12/8/05*; 7:30 pm, FSAZ	No. 24	Northern Arizona	W 75–66	3–3	McKale Center (14,592); Tucson, AZ
12/10/05*; 12:00 pm, FSAZ	No. 24	Saint Mary's	W 73–61	4–3	McKale Center (14,398); Tucson, AZ
12/17/05*; 2:00 pm, ESPN	No. 24	at Utah	W 73–43	5–3	Jon M. Huntsman Center (10,936); Salt Lake City, UT
12/19/05*; 6:30 pm, FSAZ		Sam Houston State; Fiesta Bowl Classic	W 87–51	6–3	McKale Center (14,577); Tucson, AZ
12/21/05*; 6:30 pm, FSAZ		Western Kentucky; Fiesta Bowl Classic	W 86–81 ^{OT}	7–3	McKale Center (14,589); Tucson, AZ
12/29/05; 8:00 pm, FSAZ		at Washington State	W 70–52	8–3 (1–0)	Spokane Veterans Memorial Arena (6,684); Spokane, WA
12/31/05; 12:00 pm, FSN		at No. 7 Washington	W 96–95 ^{OT}	9–3 (2–0)	Bank of America Arena (10,000); Seattle, WA
1/5/06; 8:30 pm, FSN	No. 21	No. 17 UCLA	L 79–85	9–4 (2–1)	McKale Center (14,591); Tucson, AZ
1/7/06; 12:00 pm, FSAZ	No. 21	USC	W 74–63	10–4 (3–1)	McKale Center (14,629); Tucson, AZ
1/12/06; 8:00 pm, FSAZ	No. 24	at Oregon State	L 65–75	10–5 (3–2)	Gill Coliseum (8,258); Corvallis, OR
1/14/06; 4:00 pm, FSN	No. 24	at Oregon	L 68–73	10–6 (3–3)	McArthur Court (9,087); Eugene, OR
1/19/06; 8:30 pm, FSN		Stanford	W 90–81 ^{OT}	11–6 (4–3)	McKale Center (14,611); Tucson, AZ
1/21/06; 4:00 pm, ABC		California	W 60–55	12–6 (5–3)	McKale Center (14,621); Tucson, AZ
1/25/06; 7:30 pm, FSAZ		at Arizona State; Rivalry	W 80–70	13–6 (6–3)	Wells Fargo Arena (12,782); Tempe, AZ
1/28/06*; 11:00 am, CBS		at No. 25 North Carolina	L 69–86	13–7	Dean Smith Center (21,750); Chapel Hill, NC
2/2/06; 8:30 pm, FSAZ		at USC	L 70–77	13–8 (6–4)	Los Angeles Memorial Sports Arena (5,211); Los Angeles, CA
2/4/06; 2:00 pm, FSN		at No. 13 UCLA	L 73–84	13–9 (6–5)	Pauley Pavilion (8,718); Los Angeles, CA
2/9/06; 6:30 pm, FSAZ		Oregon	W 70–68	14–9 (7–5)	McKale Center (14,598); Tucson, AZ
2/11/06; 11:30 am, FSAZ		Oregon State	W 80–58	15–9 (8–5)	McKale Center (14,624); Tucson, AZ
2/16/06; 8:30 pm, FSN		at California	L 66–75	15–10 (8–6)	Haas Pavilion (11,175); Berkeley, CA
2/19/06; 1:30 pm, CBS		at Stanford	W 76–72	16–10 (9–6)	Maples Pavilion (7,400); Stanford, CA
2/25/06; 2:00 pm, FSN		Arizona State; Rivalry	W 68–47	17–10 (10–6)	McKale Center (14,611); Tucson, AZ
3/2/06; 6:30 pm, FSAZ		Washington State	W 66–61	18–10 (11–6)	McKale Center (14,572); Tucson, AZ
3/4/06; 4:00 pm, FSN		No. 16 Washington	L 67–70	18–11 (11–7)	McKale Center (14,630); Tucson, AZ
Pac-10 tournament
3/9/06; 1:00 pm, FSN		vs. Stanford; Quarterfinal	W 73–68	19–11	Staples Center (N/A); Los Angeles, CA
3/10/06; 7:00 pm, FSN		vs. No. 8 UCLA; Semifinal	L 59–71	19–12	Staples Center (N/A); Los Angeles, CA
NCAA tournament
3/17/06*; 10:30 am, CBS	(8)	vs. (9) Wisconsin; First Round	W 94–75	20–12	Wachovia Center (19,990); Philadelphia, PA
3/19/06*; 2:50 pm, CBS	(8)	vs. (1) No. 4 Villanova; Second Round	L 78–82	20–13	Wachovia Center (20,050); Philadelphia, PA
*Non-conference game. ^{#}Rankings from AP Poll. (#) Tournament seedings in parentheses. All times are in Mountain Time.

== Awards ==
Hassan Adams

- Pac-10 All-Conference
- Pac-10 Player of the Week – December 12, 2005
- Pac-10 Player of the Week – January 2, 2006

Marcus Williams

- Pac-10 All-Freshman First Team
