= Mitch Johnson =

American basketball coach (born 1986)

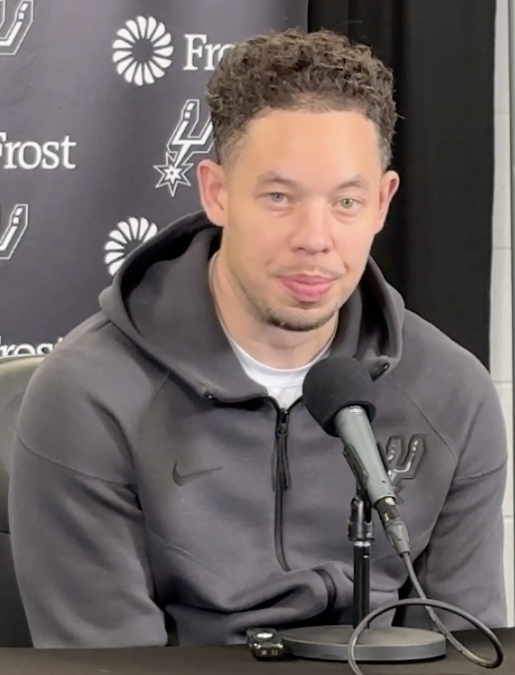
- Johnson during a pre-game interview in 2026

San Antonio Spurs
- Title: Head coach
- League: NBA

Personal information
- Born: November 29, 1986 (age 39) Seattle, Washington, U.S
- Listed height: 6 ft 1 in (1.85 m)
- Listed weight: 185 lb (84 kg)

Career information
- High school: O'Dea (Seattle, Washington)
- College: Stanford (2005–2009)
- NBA draft: 2009: undrafted
- Playing career: 2009–2011
- Position: Point guard
- Coaching career: 2011–present

Career history

Playing
- 2009: Tulsa 66ers
- 2010–2011: VEF Rīga

Coaching
- 2011–2012: Seattle Redhawks (coaching intern)
- 2015–2016: Portland Pilots (assistant)
- 2016–2019: Austin Spurs (assistant)
- 2019–2024: San Antonio Spurs (assistant)
- 2024–2025: San Antonio Spurs (interim HC)
- 2025–present: San Antonio Spurs

Career highlights
- As head coach: NBA All-Star Game head coach (2026); As assistant coach: G League champion (2018)

Mitchell Chase Johnson (born November 29, 1986) is an American professional basketball coach and former player who is the head coach for the San Antonio Spurs of the National Basketball Association (NBA). He replaced Gregg Popovich, who stepped down after 29 seasons. He previously served as the interim head coach and assistant coach of the Spurs, and served as an assistant coach for the Austin Spurs from 2016 to 2019. He played college basketball for the Stanford Cardinal.

== Early life ==
Johnson was born in Seattle on November 29, 1986. He is the son of former NBA player John Johnson, who won the 1979 NBA Finals with the Seattle SuperSonics, and Jenny Redman.

== High school career ==
From 2002 to 2005, Johnson played for O'Dea High School under coach Phil Lumpkin, where he was the team captain. During his time at O'Dea, he was a four time All-Metro selection, three-time All-area honor, two-time All-State, an MVP of state tournament and Metro Conference MVP. He averaged 22 points and eight assists in his senior season and led O'Dea to two state championships.

== College career ==
Johnson played at Stanford University for the Cardinal from 2005 to 2009. He graduated with a degree in sociology.

=== Freshman season (2005–06) ===
Johnson played 30 games during his freshman season, starting in 20 of them. He made his college debut against UC Irvine on November 19, 2005, in which he played 19 minutes as a bench player, and had his first college start on December 31, 2005, against USC where he scored six points in 23 minutes of action. During his freshman season, he recorded a total of 98 assists and 25 steals, which is the second most on the team. Johnson was an All-Freshman Team Honorable Mention pick.

=== Sophomore season (2006–07) ===
During Johnson’s sophomore season, he played 31 games and started 20 games. He recorded 103 assists, the second most on the team, while leading the team in steals with 29. On December 19, 2006, Johnson recorded a season-high 10 assists against Fresno State. On February 15, 2007, Johnson recorded 8 rebounds against Oregon State. Johnson scored 12 points against Oregon on February 17. Johnson scored 11 points, four assists and 4 rebounds on March 1 against Arizona State.

=== Junior season (2007–08) ===
Johnson played in all 36 of his team’s games while starting in 35 games. On November 10, 2007, Johnson scored 14 points against Northwestern State. He played Northwestern again on November 15, where he scored 11 points, six rebounds and seven assists. On January 3, 2008, he scored 10 points and five field goals against UCLA in 38 minutes of action. Johnson recorded nine rebounds on January 13 against Oregon. On January 26, Johnson scored a career-high 16 points along with five rebounds and seven assists, winning against California. On February 24, Johnson contributed with 11 points, and recorded 14 points along with six assists on February 28 against Washington. Johnson achieved his first college double-double on March 13, with 11 points and 10 rebounds against Arizona. During the Pacific-10 Conference men's basketball tournament against UCLA on March 15, Johnson recorded seven points, seven rebounds and five assists. During the NCAA tournament against Marquette on March 22, Johnson recorded a career-high 16 assists, breaking Stanford’s record for assists in a game. He recorded eight assists against Texas on March 28.

=== Senior season (2008–09) ===
Johnson started all 32 games in which he played. On November 14, 2008, Johnson recorded 11 points and six assists, winning against Yale. On December 20, Johnson tied his previous career-high 16 points on 5-of-5 field goal shooting, and 4-of-4 shooting from the three-point line against Northwestern. On December 23, Johnson scored 14 points against Santa Clara, and he scored 14 points again on December 30 against Hartford. On January 8, 2009, Johnson contributed 10 points against Washington. On February 28, Johnson contributed with 10 points and four assists against USC. He achieved more than 500 career assists on March 5, winning against Arizona State. On March 12, Johnson moved to second place on Stanford’s assist list after recording five assists against Washington.

== Professional career ==
After leaving Stanford, Johnson went undrafted in the 2009 NBA draft. He joined the Tulsa 66ers of the NBA D-League on November 1, 2009 and played in seven games before he was waived a month later. He also played briefly for Latvian club VEF Rīga in the 2010–11 season, before deciding to pursue coaching.

== Coaching career ==
=== Early coaching career ===
Before coaching for the Austin Spurs, Johnson was a coaching intern for Seattle University in 2011, served as a coach for an AAU team in the Nike Elite Youth Basketball League, and became an assistant coach for the Portland Pilots at the University of Portland. Johnson was an assistant coach for the Pilots during the 2015–2016 season.

=== Austin Spurs (2016–2019) ===
Johnson started his NBA coaching career as an assistant coach with the Austin Spurs in 2016. Johnson won the G League Championship with the Austin Spurs in 2018.

=== San Antonio Spurs (2019–present) ===
On September 20, 2019, the San Antonio Spurs hired Johnson to be an assistant coach for head coach Gregg Popovich. He was promoted by the Spurs to be a full-time assistant coach on November 12, 2020, and he replaced assistant coach Tim Duncan, who stepped down from his position on the Spurs. On May 15, 2021, Johnson was the interim head coach in a 140–103 loss against the Phoenix Suns as Popovich watched Tim Duncan's induction into the Basketball Hall of Fame. Johnson was the interim head coach again in a 110–99 win against the Indiana Pacers on March 2, 2023, as Popovich was unable to coach due to an illness. With the arrival of French star Victor Wembanyama in 2023, Johnson was given the duty of warming up the center before each game and they developed a close relationship.

On November 2, 2024, Popovich was sidelined indefinitely from coaching due to a health issue, which was eventually revealed to be a stroke, and Johnson became the Spurs interim head coach. He started coaching the Spurs on November 2 in a game against the Minnesota Timberwolves, having been informed two and half hours before tip off that Popovich was not available to coach because of illness, and the Spurs won 113–103 against the Timberwolves. This was the third time Johnson served as the interim head coach of the Spurs. Johnson served as the interim head coach until the end of the 2024-25 season due to Popovich sitting out from coaching for the rest of the season.

On May 2, 2025, Johnson was promoted to become the head coach of the Spurs, following Popovich's decision to step down after 29 seasons. As Popovich had only coached 5 games during the 2024–25 season, the NBA announced on July 2 that they would credit the 32–45 record of the remaining 77 games to Johnson.

During the 2025-26 season, Johnson led the Spurs to a 62-20 record and the two-seed in the Western Conference. Johnson and the Spurs advanced to the playoffs, where they faced the Portland Trail Blazers in the First Round and won in five games. This also become Johnson’s first playoff series win. In the Semi-Finals, they faced the Minnesota Timberwolves, and they had won in six games. In the Western Conference Finals, Johnson and the Spurs faced off against the top-seed and defending champion Oklahoma City Thunder, eventually winning in 7 games after trailing three games to two. Johnson helped lead the Spurs to their first NBA Finals since 2014, where they fell in five games to the New York Knicks despite holding double-digit leads in each game, including surrendering a 29-point advantage in Game 4, an NBA Finals record.

== Career playing statistics ==
Legend
GP	Games played	GS	Games started	MPG	Minutes per game
FG%	Field goal percentage	3P%	3-point field goal percentage	FT%	Free throw percentage
RPG	Rebounds per game	APG	Assists per game	SPG	Steals per game
BPG	Blocks per game	PPG	Points per game	**Bold**	Career high

=== College ===
Year	Team	GP	GS	MPG	FG%	3P%	FT%	RPG	APG	SPG	BPG	PPG
2005–06	Stanford	30	20	22.5	.314	.283	.774	2.0	3.3	.8	**.1**	3.4
2006–07	Stanford	31	20	23.5	.356	.321	**.821**	2.8	3.3	.9	.0	4.3
2007–08	Stanford	**36**	**35**	**31.5**	**.421**	**.388**	.644	**4.3**	**5.2**	.8	**.1**	**6.7**
2008–09	Stanford	32	32	29	.420	.368	.698	2.5	4.5	**1.2**	**.1**	6.6
Career		129	107	26.8	.388	.348	.708	2.9	4.1	.9	.1	5.3

=== NBA G League ===
==== Regular season ====
Year	Team	GP	GS	MPG	FG%	3P%	FT%	RPG	APG	SPG	BPG	PPG
2009–10	Tulsa	7	0	8.6	.154	.000	.750	0.9	1.0	.1	.0	1.4

== Head coaching record ==
=== NBA ===
Legend
Regular season	G	Games coached	W	Games won	L	Games lost	W–L %	Win–loss %
Playoffs	PG	Playoff games	PW	Playoff wins	PL	Playoff losses	PW–L %	Playoff win–loss %

Team	Year	G	W	L	W–L%	Finish	PG	PW	PL	PW–L%	Result
San Antonio	2024–25	77	32	45	.416	4th in Southwest	—	—	—	—	Missed playoffs
San Antonio	2025–26	82	62	20	.756	1st in Southwest	23	13	10	.565	Lost in NBA Finals
Career		159	94	65	.591		23	13	10	.565	

== Personal life ==
Johnson and his wife, Jessica, have four children, Tasia, Tatum, Johnnie and Jameson.
