= 2005–06 Washington Huskies men's basketball team =

American college basketball season

2005–06 Washington Huskies men's basketball

NCAA tournament, Sweet Sixteen
- Conference: Pacific-10 Conference

Ranking
- Coaches: No. 12
- AP: No. 17
- Record: 26–7 (13–5 Pac-10)
- Head coach: Lorenzo Romar
- Assistant coaches: Cameron Dollar; Jim Shaw; Paul Fortier
- Home arena: Bank of America Arena

2005–06 Pacific-10 Conference men's basketball standings
	Conf.				Overall
Team	W		L	PCT	W		L	PCT
No. 2 UCLA †	14	–	4	.778	32	–	7	.821
No. 12 Washington	13	–	5	.722	26	–	7	.788
California	12	–	6	.667	20	–	11	.645
Arizona ^{1}	11	–	7	.611	20	–	13	.606
Stanford	11	–	7	.611	16	–	14	.533
USC	8	–	10	.444	17	–	13	.567
Oregon	7	–	11	.389	15	–	18	.455
Oregon State ^{1}	5	–	13	.278	13	–	18	.419
Arizona State	5	–	13	.278	11	–	17	.393
Washington State	4	–	14	.222	11	–	17	.393
† Conference tournament winner As of April 3, 2006; Rankings from Coaches Poll^{1} Holds tie-breaker

The 2005–06 Washington Huskies men's basketball team represented the University of Washington in the 2005–06 NCAA Division I men's basketball season. In head coach Lorenzo Romar's fourth season at the University of Washington, the Huskies played their home games at Bank of America Arena and were members of the Pacific-10 Conference. They finished the season 26–7, 13–5 in Pac-10 play and finished second in the Pac–10 regular season's final standings behind UCLA. They earned a 5 seed in the East Regional of the NCAA tournament, where they defeated 12th seeded Utah State in the first round, 4th seeded Illinois in the second round and eventually falling 98–92 in overtime to the region's 1 seed, UConn, in the Sweet 16. This was the third straight season that the Huskies appeared in the NCAA Tournament, and the second straight year that they made it to the Sweet 16.

== Roster ==
#	Name	Height	Weight (lbs.)	Position	Class	Hometown	Previous team(s)
0	Joel Smith	6'4"	205	G	So.	Wolfeboro, NH, U.S.	Brewster Academy
1	Harvey Perry	6'5"	195	G	Fr.	Henderson, NV, U.S.	Foothill High School
3	Brandon Roy	6'6"	215	G	Sr.	Seattle, WA, U.S.	Garfield High School
5	Justin Dentmon	6'0"	180	G	Fr.	Carbondale, IL, U.S.	Carbondale Community High School
11	Brandon Burmeister	6'4"	190	G	Jr.	Mercer Island, WA, U.S.	Mercer Island HS
13	Zane Potter	6'6"	185	F	Sr.	Gresham, OR, U.S.	Sam Barlow High School
15	Bobby Jones	6'6"	210	F	Sr.	Long Beach, CA, U.S.	Polytechnic High School
20	Ryan Appleby	6'3"	165	PG	So.*	Stanwood, WA, U.S.	Stanwood High School
21	Artem Wallace	6'8"	230	C	Fr.	Toledo, WA, U.S.	Toledo High School
22	Hans Gasser	6'9"	250	F	Jr.	Issaquah, WA, U.S.	Issaquah High School
24	Jamaal Williams	6'5"	225	F	Sr.*	Corona, CA, U.S.	Centennial High School
32	Joe Wolfinger	7'0"	225	C	Fr.	Beaverton, OR, U.S.	Aloha High School
34	Zach Johnson	6'8"	275	C	Fr.*	Sacramento, CA, U.S.	Natomas High School
40	Jon Brockman	6'7"	245	F	Fr.	Snohomish, WA, U.S.	Snohomish Senior High School
42	Mike Jensen	6'8"	240	PF	Sr.*	Kent, WA, U.S.	Kentwood High School (Washington)

- Denotes the use of a redshirt season

== Coaching staff ==
Name	Position	Year at Washington	Alma mater (year)
Lorenzo Romar	Head coach	4th	Washington (1980)
Cameron Dollar	Assistant coach	4th	UCLA (1997)
Jim Shaw	Assistant coach	2nd	Western Oregon State (1985)
Paul Fortier	Assistant coach	1st	Washington (2003)
Lance LaVetter	Director of basketball operations	4th	Northern Arizona (1992)

== Schedule ==
Date time, TV	Rank^{#}	Opponent^{#}	Result	Record	Site (attendance) city, state
Exhibition
11/6/2015*; 6:00 pm		Simon Fraser	W 114–48		Alaska Airlines Arena (9,481); Seattle, WA
Regular season
11/13/2015*; 5:00 pm		Morgan St.	W 118–51	1–0	Alaska Airlines Arena (3,976); Seattle, WA
11/14/2005*; 1:00 pm		Wisconsin Green Bay	W 118–64	2–0	Alaska Airlines Arena (8,914); Seattle, WA
11/15/2005*; 11:00 am		Air Force	W 85–74	3–0	Alaska Airlines Arena (3,975); Seattle, WA
11/19/2005*; 10:30 pm		American	W 99–82	4–0	Alaska Airlines Arena (9,021); Seattle, WA
11/22/2005*; 10:00 pm	No. 25	Idaho	W 90–67	5–0	Alaska Airlines Arena (8,665); Seattle, WA
11/25/2005*; 6:00 pm, FSN Northwest	No. 25	Loyola Marymount	W 112–65	6–0	Alaska Airlines Arena (9,675); Seattle, WA
12/4/2005*; 10:30 pm, FSN	No. 18	No. 6 Gonzaga	W 99–95	7–0	Alaska Airlines Arena (10,000); Seattle, WA
12/10/2005*; 3:00 pm	No. 13	New Mexico	W 81–71	8–0	Honda Center; Anaheim, CA
12/16/2005*; 10:00 pm	No. 11	Eastern Washington	W 91–74	9–0	Alaska Airlines Arena (9,876); Seattle, WA
12/23/2005*; 8:00 pm, FSN Northwest	No. 9	Lehigh	W 54–37	10–0	Alaska Airlines Arena (10,000); Seattle, WA
12/29/2005; 10:00 pm	No. 7	Arizona State	W 91–67	11–0 (1–0)	Alaska Airlines Arena (10,000); Seattle, WA
12/31/2005; 2:00 pm, FSN	No. 7	Arizona	L 95–96 ^{2OT}	11–1 (1–1)	Alaska Airlines Arena (10,000); Seattle, WA
1/2/2006*; 10:00 pm, FSN Northwest	No. 10	Cornell	W 87–71	12–1	Alaska Airlines Arena (9,631); Seattle, WA
1/7/2006; 10:00 pm, FSN Northwest	No. 10	Washington State	L 71–78	12–2 (1–2)	Alaska Airlines Arena (10,000); Seattle, WA
1/12/2006; 10:30 pm, FSN	No. 13	USC	W 86–77	13–2 (2–2)	Los Angeles Memorial Sports Arena (4,561); Los Angeles, CA
1/14/2006; 4:00 pm, FSN	No. 13	UCLA	W 69–65	14–2 (3–2)	Pauley Pavilion (10,232); Los Angeles, CA
1/19/2006; 10:00 pm	No. 10	Oregon State	W 69–65	15–2 (4–2)	Alaska Airlines Arena; Seattle, WA
1/21/2006; 8:00 pm, FSN Northwest	No. 10	Oregon	W 78–59	16–2 (5–2)	Alaska Airlines Arena (10,000); Seattle, WA
1/26/2006; 10:30 pm	No. 10	California	L 69–71	16–3 (5–3)	Haas Pavilion (8,957); Berkeley, CA
1/29/2006; 8:00 pm, FSN	No. 10	Stanford	L 67–76 ^{OT}	16–4 (5–4)	Maples Pavilion; Stanford, CA
2/4/2006; 5:00 pm	No. 16	Washington State	L 64–77	16–5 (5–5)	Beasley Coliseum (8,770); Pullman, WA
2/9/2006; 10:30 pm, FSN Northwest	No. 21	USC	W 87–73	17–5 (6–5)	Alaska Airlines Arena (10,000); Seattle, WA
2/11/2006; 3:30 pm, ABC	No. 21	No. 13 UCLA	W 70–67	18–5 (7–5)	Alaska Airlines Arena (10,000); Seattle, WA
2/16/2006; 8:30 pm, FSN Northwest	No. 20	Oregon	W 75–72	19–5 (8–5)	McArthur Court (8,904); Eugene, OR
2/18/2006; 10:00 pm, FSN Northwest	No. 20	Oregon State	W 96–63	20–5 (9–5)	Gill Coliseum (9,512); Corvallis, OR
2/23/2006; 10:30 pm, FSN	No. 17	Stanford	W 75–57	21–5 (10–5)	Alaska Airlines Arena (10,000); Seattle, WA
2/26/2006; 8:00 pm, FSN	No. 17	California	W 73–62	22–5 (11–5)	Alaska Airlines Arena (10,000); Seattle, WA
3/2/2006; 9:00 pm	No. 14	Arizona State	W 91–66	23–5 (12–5)	Wells Fargo Arena (6,755); Tempe, AZ
3/4/2006; 6:00 pm, FSN	No. 14	Arizona	W 70–67	24–5 (13–5)	McKale Center (14,630); Tucson, AZ
Pac-10 Tournament
3/9/2006; 9:00 pm	No. 12	Oregon; Quarterfinals	L 73–84	24–6	Staples Center (15,321); Los Angeles, CA
NCAA Tournament
3/16/2006*; 8:00 pm, CBS	(5)	vs. (12) Utah State; First round	W 75–61	25–6	Cox Arena (9,891); San Diego, CA
3/18/2006*; 6:55 pm, CBS	(5)	vs. (4) Illinois; Second round	W 67–64	26–6	Cox Arena; San Diego, CA
3/24/2006*; 9:50 pm, CBS	(5)	vs. (1) Connecticut; Sweet Sixteen	L 92–98 ^{OT}	26–7	Verizon Center (19,368); Washington, D.C.
*Non-conference game. ^{#}Rankings from AP Poll. (#) Tournament seedings in parentheses. All times are in Pacific Time.
