= 2005–06 UCLA Bruins men's basketball team =

American college basketball season

2005–06 UCLA Bruins men's basketball

NCAA tournament, Runner-up Pac-10 regular season & tournament champions

National Championship Game, L 57–73 vs. Florida
- Conference: Pacific-10 Conference

Ranking
- Coaches: No. 2
- AP: No. 8
- Record: 32–7 (14–4 Pac-10)
- Head coach: Ben Howland (3rd season)
- Assistant coaches: Donny Daniels; Ernie Zeigler; Kerry Keating
- Home arena: Pauley Pavilion

2005–06 Pacific-10 Conference men's basketball standings
	Conf.				Overall
Team	W		L	PCT	W		L	PCT
No. 2 UCLA †	14	–	4	.778	32	–	7	.821
No. 12 Washington	13	–	5	.722	26	–	7	.788
California	12	–	6	.667	20	–	11	.645
Arizona ^{1}	11	–	7	.611	20	–	13	.606
Stanford	11	–	7	.611	16	–	14	.533
USC	8	–	10	.444	17	–	13	.567
Oregon	7	–	11	.389	15	–	18	.455
Oregon State ^{1}	5	–	13	.278	13	–	18	.419
Arizona State	5	–	13	.278	11	–	17	.393
Washington State	4	–	14	.222	11	–	17	.393
† Conference tournament winner As of April 3, 2006; Rankings from Coaches Poll^{1} Holds tie-breaker

The 2005–06 UCLA Bruins men's basketball team represented the University of California, Los Angeles in the 2005–06 NCAA Division I men's basketball season. The UCLA Bruins finished the regular season with a 14–4 record in conference play. After winning the Pac-10 tournament, the Bruins conference record was 17–4. The team reached the 2006 NCAA Division I men's basketball tournament championship game, losing to the Florida Gators, 73–57, denying them their 12th title. The Bruins finished with 32 wins (14 more than the previous season).

== Recruiting class ==
College recruiting
Name	Hometown	School	Height	Weight	Commit date
Alfred Aboya; C	Yaoundé, Cameroon	Tilton N.H. School	6 ft 9 in (2.06 m)	245 lb (111 kg)	Nov 9, 2004
Alfred Aboya; C	Recruit ratings: Scout: Rivals:				
Darren Collison; PG	Rancho Cucamonga, California	Etiwanda HS	6 ft 0 in (1.83 m)	160 lb (73 kg)	Jun 13, 2004
Darren Collison; PG	Recruit ratings: Scout: Rivals:				
Luc Mbah a Moute; SG	Yaoundé, Cameroon	Montverde Florida Academy	6 ft 8 in (2.03 m)	230 lb (100 kg)	Oct 22, 2004
Luc Mbah a Moute; SG	Recruit ratings: Scout: Rivals:				
Michael Roll; SG	Aliso Viejo, California	Aliso Niguel HS	6 ft 5 in (1.96 m)	200 lb (91 kg)	Nov 6, 2004
Michael Roll; SG	Recruit ratings: Scout: Rivals:				
Ryan Wright; PF	Mississauga, Ontario	Loyola Catholic HS	6 ft 8 in (2.03 m)	240 lb (110 kg)	Oct 18, 2004
Ryan Wright; PF	Recruit ratings: Scout: Rivals:				
Overall recruit ranking: Scout: 13 Rivals: 18
Note: In many cases, Scout, Rivals, 247Sports, On3, and ESPN may conflict in their listings of height and weight.; In these cases, the average was taken. ESPN grades are on a 100-point scale.; Sources: "UCLA Commit List for 2005". Rivals.; "Men's Basketball Recruiting". Scout.; "ESPN – UCLA Bruins Basketball Recruiting 2005". ESPN.; "Scout.com Team Recruiting Rankings". Scout.; "2005 Team Ranking". Rivals.

== Roster ==
2005–06 UCLA Bruins men's basketball team
Players
Coaches

Pos.	#	Name	Height	Weight	Year	Hometown
F/C	12	Alfred Aboya	6 ft 8 in (2.03 m)	245 lb (111 kg)	Fr	Yaoundé (Cameroon)
G	4	Arron Afflalo (C)	6 ft 5 in (1.96 m)	215 lb (98 kg)	So	Compton, California
G	21	Cedric Bozeman (C)	6 ft 6 in (1.98 m)	207 lb (94 kg)	Sr	Los Angeles, California
G	2	Darren Collison	6 ft 1 in (1.85 m)	160 lb (73 kg)	Fr	Rancho Cucamonga, California
G	1	Jordan Farmar (C)	6 ft 2 in (1.88 m)	180 lb (82 kg)	So	Los Angeles, California
C	45	Michael Fey	7 ft 0 in (2.13 m)	270 lb (122 kg)	Sr	Olympia, Washington
C	15	Ryan Hollins	7 ft 0 in (2.13 m)	230 lb (104 kg)	Sr	Pasadena, California
G	22	Kelvin Kim (W)	5 ft 10 in (1.78 m)	175 lb (79 kg)	Fr	Lake Forest, California
F/C	14	Lorenzo Mata	6 ft 9 in (2.06 m)	240 lb (109 kg)	So	Huntington Park, California
F	23	Luc Richard Mbah a Moute	6 ft 8 in (2.03 m)	230 lb (104 kg)	Fr	Yaoundé (Cameroon)
G	5	DeAndre Robinson (W)	6 ft 5 in (1.96 m)	210 lb (95 kg)	So	Riverside, California
G	55	Nican Robinson (W)	5 ft 11 in (1.8 m)	185 lb (84 kg)	So	Oakland, California
G/F	20	Michael Roll	6 ft 5 in (1.96 m)	200 lb (91 kg)	Fr	Aliso Viejo, California
G	10	Janou Rubin	6 ft 3 in (1.91 m)	208 lb (94 kg)	Sr	Union City, California
G/F	3	Josh Shipp (injured) (redshirt)	6 ft 5 in (1.96 m)	220 lb (100 kg)	So	Los Angeles, California
F	11	Ryan Wright	6 ft 9 in (2.06 m)	238 lb (108 kg)	Fr	Mississauga, Ontario

Head coach

Ben Howland (Weber State)

Assistant coach(es)

- Donny Daniels (Cal State Fullerton)
- Ernie Zeigler (Cleary University)
- Kerry Keating (Seton Hall)

Legend

- (C) Team captain
- (S) Suspended
- (I) Ineligible
- (W) Walk-on
- Injured
- Current redshirt

Roster

== Schedule ==
Date time, TV	Rank^{#}	Opponent^{#}	Result	Record	Site city, state
Exhibition
November 4, 2005*		Carleton	W 78–51		Pauley Pavilion; Los Angeles, California
November 10, 2005*		Cal State Monterey Bay	W 104–41		Pauley Pavilion; Los Angeles, California
Regular Season
November 15, 2005*; 7:00 p.m., ESPN2	No. 18	New Mexico State; NIT Season Tip-Off	W 83–70	1–0	Pauley Pavilion (6,285); Los Angeles, California
November 17, 2005*; 8:00 p.m., ESPNU	No. 18	Temple; NIT Season Tip-Off	W 54–47	2–0	Pauley Pavilion (7,791); Los Angeles, California
November 19, 2005*; 7:30 p.m.	No. 18	Delaware State; NIT Season Tip-Off	W 56–37	3–0	Pauley Pavilion (7,247); Los Angeles, California
November 23, 2005*; 9:20 p.m., ESPN2	No. 16	vs. No. 11 Memphis; NIT Season Tip-Off	L 80–88	3–1	Madison Square Garden (9,766); New York City, New York
November 25, 2005*; 4:30 p.m., ESPN2	No. 16	vs. Drexel; NIT Season Tip-Off	W 57–56	4–1	Madison Square Garden (12,129); New York City, New York
November 29, 2005*; 7:30 p.m., FSN West 2	No. 16	Albany	W 73–65	5–1	Pauley Pavilion (6,194); Los Angeles, California
December 4, 2005*; 1:00 p.m.	No. 16	Coppin State	W 69–57	6–1	Pauley Pavilion (6,044); Los Angeles, California
December 10, 2005*; 2:40 p.m., KCAL	No. 16	vs. No. 17 Nevada; John R. Wooden Classic	W 67–56	7–1	Arrowhead Pond (12,109); Anaheim, California
December 17, 2005*; 12:00 p.m., ESPN	No. 14	at Michigan	W 68–61	8–1	Crisler Arena (13,751); Ann Arbor, Michigan
December 21, 2005*; 7:30 p.m.	No. 12	Wagner	W 74–72	9–1	Pauley Pavilion (7,738); Los Angeles, California
December 23, 2005*; 7:30 p.m., FSN West 2	No. 12	Sacramento State	W 86–56	10–1	Pauley Pavilion (7,452); Los Angeles, California
December 29, 2005; 7:30 p.m., FSN	No. 11	Stanford	W 71–54	11–1 (1–0)	Pauley Pavilion (10,984); Los Angeles, California
December 31, 2005; 1:00 p.m., FSN West 2	No. 11	California	L 61–68	11–2 (1–1)	Pauley Pavilion (10,129); Los Angeles, California
January 5, 2006; 8:30 p.m., FSN	No. 17	at No. 21 Arizona	W 85–79	12–2 (2–1)	McKale Center (14,591); Tucson, Arizona
January 7, 2006; 1:00 p.m., FSN West 2	No. 17	at Arizona State	W 61–60	13–2 (3–1)	Wells Fargo Arena (8,490); Tempe, Arizona
January 12, 2006; 7:30 p.m., FSN West 2	No. 11	Washington State	W 63–61	14–2 (4–1)	Pauley Pavilion (9,550); Los Angeles, California
January 14, 2006; 1:00 p.m., FSN	No. 11	No. 13 Washington	L 65–69	14–3 (4–2)	Pauley Pavilion (10,232); Los Angeles, California
January 18, 2006; 7:30 p.m., FSN West 2	No. 18	USC	W 66–45	15–3 (5–2)	Pauley Pavilion (13,037); Los Angeles, California
January 21, 2006*; 12:45 p.m., CBS	No. 18	No. 12 West Virginia	L 56–60	15–4	Pauley Pavilion (12,035); Los Angeles, California
January 26, 2006; 7:30 p.m., CBS	No. 17	at Oregon	W 56–49	16–4 (6–2)	McArthur Court (9,087); Eugene, Oregon
January 28, 2006; 1:00 p.m., FSN	No. 17	at Oregon State	W 63–54	17–4 (7–2)	Gill Coliseum (8,250); Corvallis, Oregon
February 2, 2006; 7:30 p.m., FSN West 2	No. 14	Arizona State	W 69–60	18–4 (8–2)	Pauley Pavilion (7,593); Los Angeles, California
February 4, 2006; 1:00 p.m., FSN	No. 14	Arizona	W 84–73	19–4 (9–2)	Pauley Pavilion (8,718); Los Angeles, California
February 9, 2006; 7:30 p.m., FSN	No. 13	at Washington State	W 50–30	20–4 (10–2)	Beasley Coliseum (4,097); Pullman, Washington
February 11, 2006; 12:30 p.m., ABC	No. 13	at No. 21 Washington	L 67–70	20–5 (10–3)	Alaska Airlines Arena (10,000); Seattle, Washington
February 19, 2006; 5:00 p.m., FSN	No. 15	at USC	L 68–71	20–6 (10–4)	Los Angeles Memorial Sports Arena (9,009); Los Angeles, California
February 23, 2006; 7:30 p.m., FSN West 2	No. 19	Oregon State	W 78–60	21–6 (11–4)	Pauley Pavilion (8,707); Los Angeles, California
February 26, 2006; 1:00 p.m., CBS	No. 19	Oregon	W 70–53	22–6 (12–4)	Pauley Pavilion (11,463); Los Angeles, California
March 2, 2006; 7:40 p.m., FSN	No. 15	at California	W 67–58 ^{OT}	23–6 (13–4)	Haas Pavilion (11,877); Berkeley, California
March 4, 2006; 1:00 p.m., CBS	No. 15	at Stanford	W 75–54	24–6 (14–4)	Maples Pavilion (7,334); Stanford, California
Pac-10 Tournament
March 9, 2006; 2:45 p.m., FSN	No. 13 (1)	vs. (8) Oregon State; Quarterfinals	W 79–47	25–6	Staples Center (15,144); Los Angeles, California
March 10, 2006; 6:00 p.m., FSN	No. 13 (1)	vs. (4) Arizona; Semifinals	W 71–59	26–6	Staples Center (17,856); Los Angeles, California
March 11, 2006; 3:15 p.m., CBS	No. 13 (1)	vs. (3) California; Finals	W 71–52	27–6	Staples Center (18,544); Los Angeles, California
NCAA tournament
March 16, 2006; 3:20 p.m., CBS	No. 7 (2 OA)	vs. (15 OA) Belmont; First Round	W 78–44	28–6	Cox Arena (10,068); San Diego, California
March 18, 2006; 5:00 p.m., CBS	No. 7 (2 OA)	vs. (10 OA) Alabama; Second Round	W 62–59	29–6	Cox Arena (10,687); San Diego, California
March 23, 2006; 7:10 p.m., CBS	No. 7 (2 OA)	vs. No. 5 (3 OA) Gonzaga; Sweet Sixteen	W 73–71	30–6	Oakland Arena (19,596); Oakland, California
March 25, 2006; 4:10 p.m., CBS	No. 7 (2 OA)	vs. No. 4 (1 OA) Memphis; Elite Eight	W 50–45	31–6	Oakland Arena (19,689); Oakland, California
April 1, 2006; 8:51 p.m., CBS	No. 7 (2 OA)	vs. No. 19 (4 AT) LSU; Final Four	W 59–45	32–6	RCA Dome (43,822); Indianapolis, Indiana
April 3, 2006; 9:21 p.m., CBS	No. 7 (2 OA)	vs. No. 10 (3 MI) Florida; National Championship Game	L 57–73	32–7	RCA Dome (43,168); Indianapolis, Indiana
*Non-conference game. ^{#}Rankings from AP Poll. (#) Tournament seedings in parentheses. All times are in Pacific Time.
