= Mick Hedgepeth =

American basketball coach (born 1989)

Current position
- Title: Head coach
- Team: Alabama–Huntsville
- Conference: Gulf South Conference
- Record: 60–12 (.833)

Biographical details
- Born: October 5, 1989 (age 37); Birmingham, Alabama, U.S.

Playing career
- 2008–2012: Belmont
- 2012–2013: Araberri BC
- Position: Center

Coaching career (HC unless noted)
- 2014–2016: Williams (assistant)
- 2016–2017: Sewanee (assistant)
- 2017–2019: Sewanee
- 2022–2024: Berry
- 2024–present: Alabama–Huntsville

Administrative career (AD unless noted)
- 2019–2022: Belmont (DBO)

Head coaching record
- Overall: 140–43 (.765)
- Tournaments: 4–2 (NCAA Division II); 0–2 (NCAA Division III)

Accomplishments and honors

Championships
- GSC regular season (2025); GSC tournament (2025); 2 SAA regular season (2023, 2024); 2 SAA tournament (2019, 2024)

Awards
- GSC Coach of the Year (2025); SAA Coach of the Year (2023)

Michael Earl Hedgepeth (born October 5, 1989) is an American college basketball coach who is the head coach of the Alabama–Huntsville Chargers basketball team. He was previously the head coach at Sewanee and Berry.

== Early life and playing career ==
Hedgepeth grew up in Crossville, Alabama and attended Crossville High School, where he played baseball and basketball. He averaged 23.0 points, 12.4 rebounds, and 4.7 blocks per game as a senior.

Hedgepeth played college basketball at Belmont. Hedgepeth scored 1,191 points with 691 rebounds and 78 blocked shots during his college career and was inducted into Belmont's Athletic Hall of Fame in 2023. After his college career, Hedgepeth played professionally for one season with Araberri BC of the Spanish LEB Plata.

== Coaching career ==
Hedgepeth began his coaching career as an assistant at Williams College in 2014. He spent two seasons with the Ephs before taking an assistant position at Sewanee. Hedgepeth was promoted to head coach of the Tigers after one season. His teams went 36–16 and won the 2019 Southern Athletic Association (SAA) tournament. Hedgepeth left Sewanee in 2019 to become the Director of Basketball Operations at Belmont.

Hedgepeth was hired as the head coach at Berry College on May 9, 2022. The Vikings won both the SAA regular season and the SAA conference tournament in his second season.

Hedgepeth was hired as the head coach of the University of Alabama in Huntsville Chargers on April 16, 2024. He won his 100th game with a 98–86 victory over Trevecca on February 1, 2025. In his first season, Hedgepeth was named the Gulf South Conference (GSC) Coach of the Year after the Chargers went undefeated in GSC play and won the final 28 games of the regular season after losing to #1 ranked Nova Southeastern 104-105 in overtime to begin the season.

== Head coaching record ==
Record table
| Season | Team | Overall | Conference | Standing | Postseason |
|---|---|---|---|---|---|
Sewanee (Southern Athletic Association) (2017–2019)
| 2017–2018 | Sewanee | 14–11 | 10–4 | | |
| 2018–2019 | Sewanee | 22–7 | 8–6 | | NCAA Division III First Round |
| Sewanee: | | 36–18 (.667) | 18–10 (.643) | | |
Berry Vikings (Southern Athletic Association) (2022–2024)
| 2022–2023 | Berry | 25–3 | 14–0 | 1st | |
| 2023–2024 | Berry | 19–10 | 16–1 | 1st | NCAA Division III First Round |
| Berry: | | 44–13 (.772) | 30–1 (.968) | | |
Alabama–Huntsville (Gulf South Conference) (2024–present)
| 2024–2025 | Alabama–Huntsville | 32–2 | 22–0 | 1st | NCAA Division II Sweet 16 |
| 2025–2026 | Alabama–Huntsville | 23–10 | 15–7 | 4th | NCAA Division II Sweet 16 |
| 2026–2027 | Alabama–Huntsville | 5–0 | 0–0 | | |
| Alabama–Huntsville: | | 60–12 (.833) | 37–7 (.841) | | |
| Total: | | 140–43 (.765) | | | |
National champion Postseason invitational champion Conference regular season champion Conference regular season and conference tournament champion Division regular season champion Division regular season and conference tournament champion Conference tournament champion
