= 2006 Pacific-10 Conference men's basketball tournament =

- Classification: Division I
- Season: 2005–06
- Teams: 10
- Site: Staples Center; Los Angeles, California
- Champions: UCLA Bruins (2nd title)
- Winning coach: Ben Howland (1st title)
- MVP: Leon Powe (California)
- Attendance: 74,801
- Top scorers: Leon Powe (California) #q (80 points)

2005–06 Pacific-10 Conference men's basketball standings
	Conf.				Overall
Team	W		L	PCT	W		L	PCT
No. 2 UCLA †	14	–	4	.778	32	–	7	.821
No. 12 Washington	13	–	5	.722	26	–	7	.788
California	12	–	6	.667	20	–	11	.645
Arizona ^{1}	11	–	7	.611	20	–	13	.606
Stanford	11	–	7	.611	16	–	14	.533
USC	8	–	10	.444	17	–	13	.567
Oregon	7	–	11	.389	15	–	18	.455
Oregon State ^{1}	5	–	13	.278	13	–	18	.419
Arizona State	5	–	13	.278	11	–	17	.393
Washington State	4	–	14	.222	11	–	17	.393
† Conference tournament winner As of April 3, 2006; Rankings from Coaches Poll^{1} Holds tie-breaker

The 2006 Pacific Life Pacific-10 Conference men's basketball tournament was played between March 8 and March 11, 2006, at Staples Center in Los Angeles, California. The champion of the tournament was UCLA, which received the Pac-10's automatic bid to the NCAA tournament.

== Seeds ==
All Pacific-10 schools play in the tournament. Teams are seeded by conference record, with a tiebreaker system used to seed teams with identical conference records.

Seed	School	Conference (Overall)	Tiebreaker
1	UCLA	14–4 (24–6)	
2	Washington	13–5 (24–5)	
3	California	12–6 (18–9)	
4	Arizona	11–7 (18–11)	2–0 vs. STAN
5	Stanford	11–7 (15–12)	0–2 vs. ARIZ
6	USC	8–10 (17–12)	
7	Oregon	7–11 (13–17)	
8	Oregon State	5–13 (12–17)	
9	Arizona State	5–13 (11–16)	
10	Washington State	4–14 (11–16)	

== Bracket ==
Play-in Round; Wednesday, March 8
8	Oregon State	71
9	Arizona State	68
7	Oregon	66
10	Washington State	55

Quarterfinals; Thursday, March 9
1	#13 UCLA	79
8	Oregon State	47
4	Arizona	73
5	Stanford	68
3	California	82
6	USC	67
2	#12 Washington	73
7	Oregon	84

Semifinals; Friday, March 10
1	#13 UCLA	71
4	Arizona	59
3	California	91**
7	Oregon	87

Final; Saturday, March 11
1	#13 UCLA	71
3	California	52

** Double Overtime

== Tournament Notes ==
- This was the first tournament in 3 years in which the top two seeds didn't play in the final game.
- UCLA's 19-point margin of victory over Cal (71-52) is one of the largest in this tournament's history for the championship game.
- California had someone selected for the All Tournament team for the first time. Two players were in fact selected.
- Leon Powe of Cal made a record total 30 free throws for a single Pac-10/12 tournament (30-of-41, 3 games). This record still stands.
- Leon Powe's 41 FT attempts for those games is also a tournament record.

== All tournament team ==
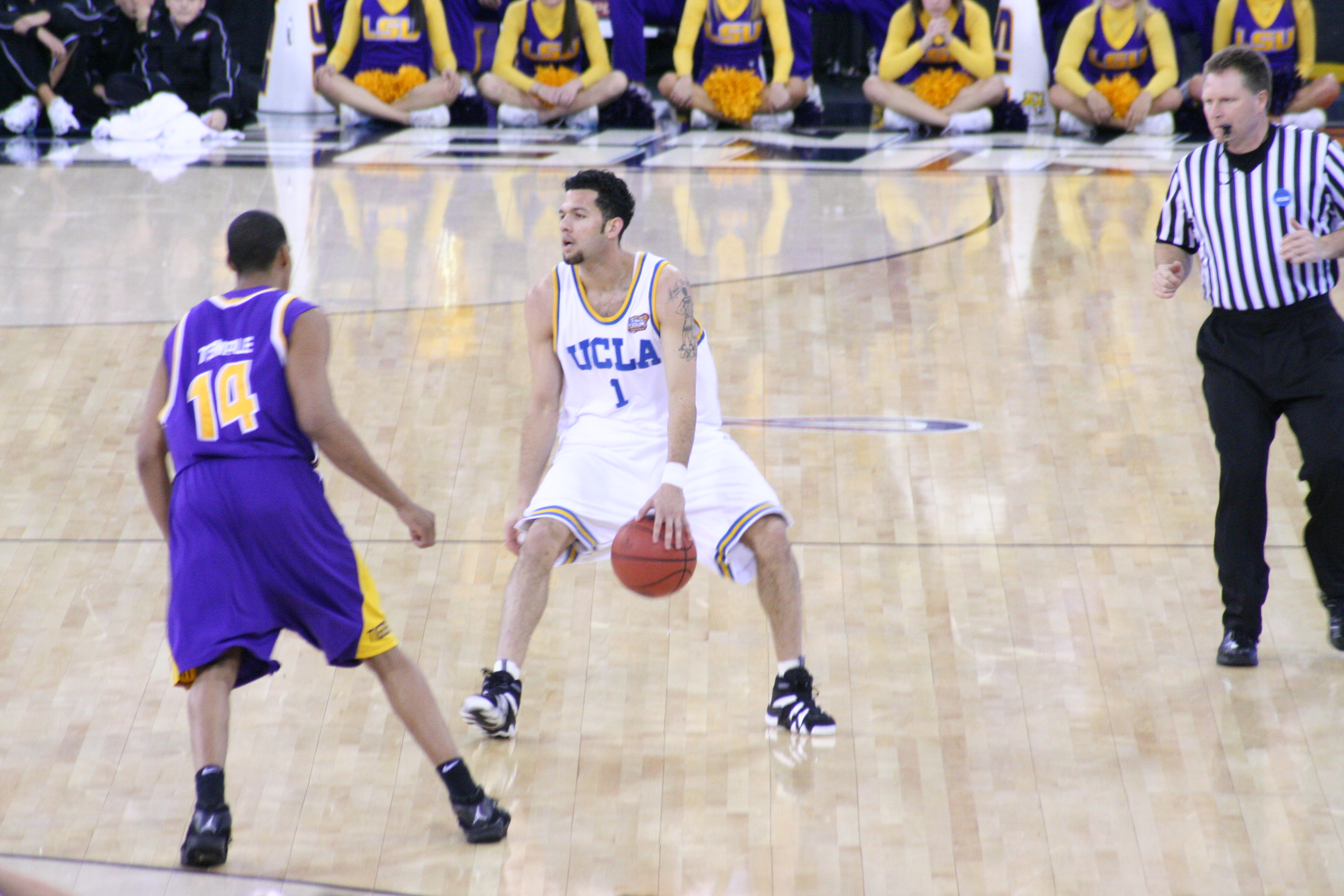
Jordan Farmar

- Leon Powe, California – Tournament MVP
- Brandon Roy, Washington
- Chamberlain Oguchi, Oregon
- Ayinde Ubaka, California
- Jordan Farmar, UCLA
- Arron Afflalo, UCLA
