= 2005–06 Washington State Cougars men's basketball team =

American college basketball season

2005–06 Washington State Cougars men's basketball
- Conference: Pacific-10 Conference
- Record: 11–17 (4–14 Pac-10)
- Head coach: Dick Bennett (3rd season)
- Assistant coach: Tony Bennett
- Home arena: Beasley Coliseum

2005–06 Pacific-10 Conference men's basketball standings
	Conf.				Overall
Team	W		L	PCT	W		L	PCT
No. 2 UCLA †	14	–	4	.778	32	–	7	.821
No. 12 Washington	13	–	5	.722	26	–	7	.788
California	12	–	6	.667	20	–	11	.645
Arizona ^{1}	11	–	7	.611	20	–	13	.606
Stanford	11	–	7	.611	16	–	14	.533
USC	8	–	10	.444	17	–	13	.567
Oregon	7	–	11	.389	15	–	18	.455
Oregon State ^{1}	5	–	13	.278	13	–	18	.419
Arizona State	5	–	13	.278	11	–	17	.393
Washington State	4	–	14	.222	11	–	17	.393
† Conference tournament winner As of April 3, 2006; Rankings from Coaches Poll^{1} Holds tie-breaker

The 2005–06 Washington State Cougars men's basketball team represented Washington State University for the 2005–06 NCAA Division I men's basketball season. Led by second-year head coach Dick Bennett, the Cougars were members of the Pacific-10 Conference and played their home games on campus at Beasley Coliseum in Pullman, Washington.

The Cougars were 11–16 overall in the regular season and 4–14 in conference play, last in the standings.

Seeded tenth in the conference tournament, the Cougars met seventh seed Oregon in the opening round. The Ducks had swept the regular season series and won the tournament game by eleven points.

Bennett stepped down as head coach after the season and was succeeded by son Tony.

== Postseason result ==
Date time, TV	Opponent	Result	Record	Site (attendance) city, state
Pacific-10 Tournament
Wed, March 8; 8:40 pm, FSN	vs. (7) Oregon; Quarterfinal	L 55–66	11–17	Staples Center (7,936); Los Angeles, California
*Non-conference game. ^{#}Rankings from AP poll. (#) Tournament seedings in parentheses. All times are in Pacific time.
