= McCarthey Athletic Center =

Indoor arena on the campus of Gonzaga University in Spokane, Washington

- The Kennel; The New Kennel; K2
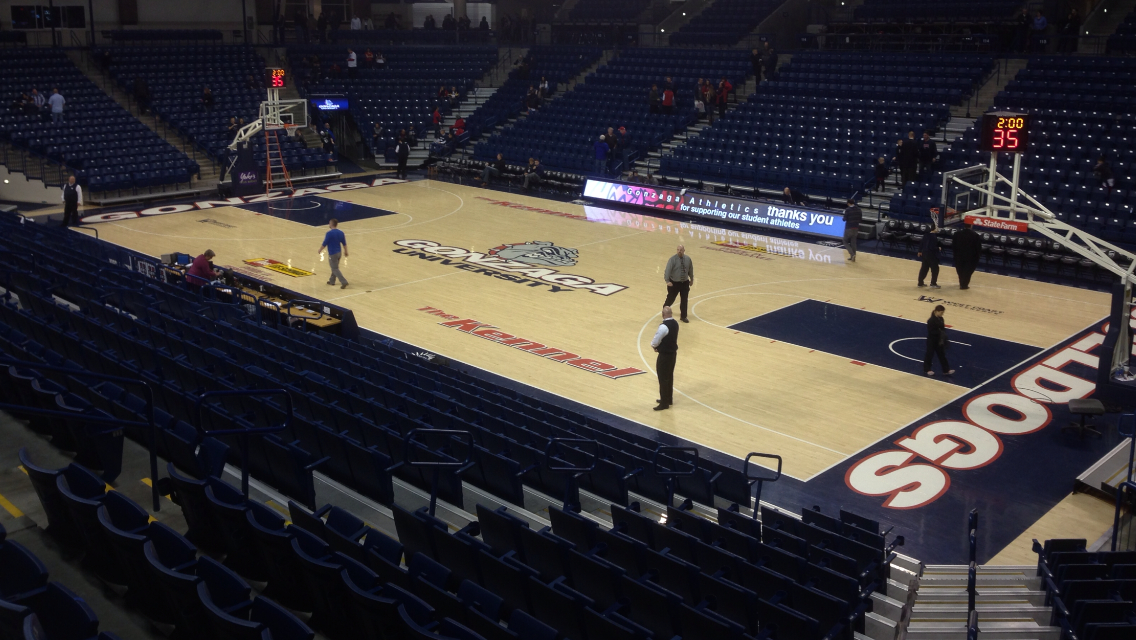
- February 2013

- Location in the United States Location in Washington
- Interactive map of McCarthey Athletic Center
- Address: 801 N. Cincinnati Street
- Location: Gonzaga University; Spokane, Washington, U.S.
- Coordinates: 47.665°N 117.399°W
- Owner: Gonzaga University
- Operator: Gonzaga University
- Capacity: 6,000
- Surface: Hardwood

Construction
- Groundbreaking: April 24, 2003
- Opened: November 19, 2004; 21 years ago
- Cost: $25 million ($42.6 million in 2025)
- Architects: ALSC Architects & Ellerbe Becket
- Project manager: Garco Construction Inc.
- Structural engineer: DCI Engineers Inc.

Tenants
- Gonzaga Bulldogs (2004–present) (Men's and Women's) (Pac-12 Conference, NCAA)

Website
- McCarthey Athletic Center

McCarthey Athletic Center (MAC) is a 6,000-seat indoor arena in the Northwestern United States, located on the campus of Gonzaga University in Spokane, Washington. Opened in November 2004, it is home to the university's Bulldog basketball programs, members of the Pac-12 Conference in Division I of the NCAA.

The MAC is nicknamed "The New Kennel" in reference to the school's former basketball arena, Charlotte Y. Martin Centre, popularly known as "The Kennel," which had been home to the Bulldogs for 39 years. As the MAC has become the established basketball arena on campus, more fans have begun calling it simply "The Kennel," referring to its predecessor as the "Martin Centre." The court's elevation is approximately 1,900 feet (580 m) above sea level.

== History ==
Ground was broken in April 2003 on the site of the baseball venue, Pecarovich Field. The naming rights went to the McCarthey brothers of Salt Lake City, as a result of major gifts by Gonzaga trustee Philip McCarthey and regent Thomas McCarthey; both are GU alumni and former owners of The Salt Lake Tribune. The new baseball stadium was later built to the south and opened in 2007; in the interim, the Bulldogs played at Avista Stadium, home of the minor league Spokane Indians of the short-season Northwest League.

McCarthey Athletic Center opened on November 19, 2004, a 98–80 non-conference win over Portland State. In its second season, it hosted the WCC tournament in March 2006; it was the event's first time in Spokane, as the original "Kennel" was considered too small and the larger Spokane Arena was unavailable due to annual scheduling conflicts. Gonzaga narrowly won its two games: the semifinal with San Diego went to overtime, and the final over Loyola Marymount was won by a single point.

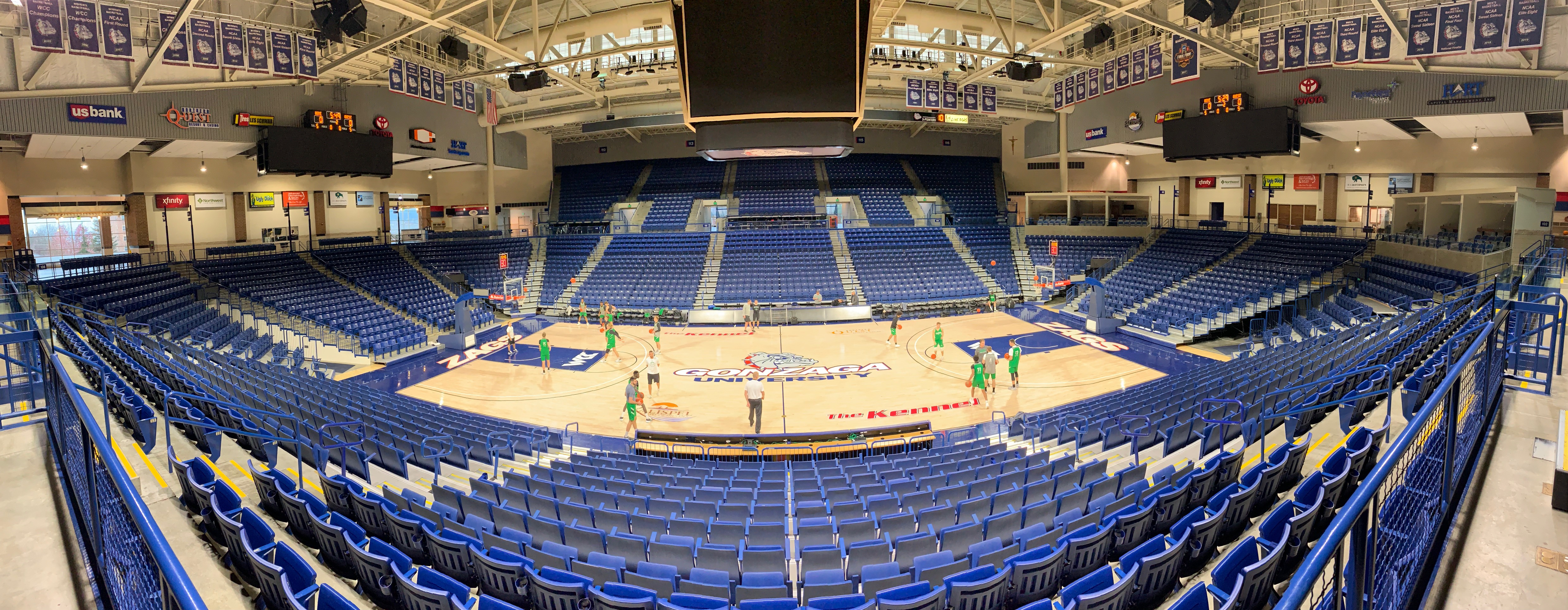
McCarthey Athletic Center

By February 2007, Gonzaga had 38 consecutive wins in the arena and a 50-game winning streak at home dating back to the Martin Centre. Santa Clara ended what was, at the time, the longest home win streak in the NCAA. In February 2015, BYU snapped Gonzaga's 41-game home winning streak in the McCarthey Athletic Center, which was also the longest active home winning streak in the NCAA at the time.

Through February 6, 2020, the Zags are 223–15 (.937) in the McCarthey Athletic Center, which includes a 105–8 (.929) record in non-conference games, a 116–7 (.943) record in conference games, and a 2–0 record in the WCC tournament.

== Concert venue ==
The arena has also served as a venue for concerts by Switchfoot, Yellowcard, Ben Folds, Death Cab for Cutie, and Jay Sean. Comedians such as Bill Cosby, Jeff Foxworthy, and Kevin Hart have also performed at the arena.

== Records ==
- On January 16, 2010, Heather Bowman broke the WCC women's basketball all-time points record.
- On March 21, 2011, Courtney Vandersloot became the first basketball player (men's or women's) to score 2,000 points and tally 1,000 assists in their career.

== NCAA Women's tournament ==
The McCarthey Athletic Center hosted games of the first and second rounds of the Division I women's basketball tournament in 2011, 2012, 2013 and 2024.

== See also ==
- List of NCAA Division I basketball arenas
