= 2005–06 Belmont Bruins men's basketball team =

American college basketball season

2005–06 Belmont Bruins men's basketball

Atlantic Sun tournament champion

NCAA tournament, Round of 64
- Conference: Atlantic Sun Conference
- Record: 20–11 (15–5 A-Sun)
- Head coach: Rick Byrd (20th season)
- Assistant coaches: Casey Alexander; Brian Ayers; Roger Idstrom
- Home arena: Curb Event Center

2005–06 Atlantic Sun men's basketball standings
	Conf.				Overall
Team	W		L	PCT	W		L	PCT
Lipscomb	15	–	5	.750	21	–	11	.656
Belmont †	15	–	5	.750	20	–	11	.645
Florida Atlantic	14	–	6	.700	15	–	13	.536
Gardner–Webb	13	–	7	.650	17	–	12	.586
East Tennessee State	12	–	8	.600	15	–	13	.536
Stetson	11	–	9	.550	14	–	18	.438
Kennesaw State	10	–	10	.500	12	–	17	.414
Campbell	9	–	11	.450	10	–	18	.357
Mercer	7	–	13	.350	9	–	19	.321
North Florida	3	–	17	.150	6	–	22	.214
Jacksonville	1	–	19	.050	1	–	26	.037
† 2006 Atlantic Sun Tournament winner As of March 7, 2006; Rankings from AP Poll

The 2005–06 Belmont Bruins men's basketball team represented Belmont University in the 2005–06 NCAA Division I men's basketball season. The Bruins, led by head coach Rick Byrd, played their home games at the Curb Event Center in Nashville, Tennessee, as members of the Atlantic Sun Conference. After finishing 2nd in the conference regular season standings, the Bruins won the Atlantic Sun tournament to earn an automatic bid to the NCAA tournament as the 15th seed in the Oakland region. Belmont was beaten No. 2 seed UCLA in the first round, 78–44.

== Roster ==
2005–06 Belmont Bruins men's basketball team
Players
Coaches

Pos.	#	Name	Height	Weight	Year	Hometown
G/F	2	Shane Dansby	6 ft 2 in (1.88 m)	210 lb (95 kg)	Fr	Pegram, Tennessee
G	4	Josh Goodwin	6 ft 3 in (1.91 m)	205 lb (93 kg)	Jr	Pegram, Tennessee
G	12	Alex Renfroe	6 ft 2 in (1.88 m)	160 lb (73 kg)	So	Hermitage, Tennessee
G/F	14	Andrew House	6 ft 4 in (1.93 m)	200 lb (91 kg)	Fr	Nashville, Tennessee
G	20	Andy Wicke	6 ft 2 in (1.88 m)	195 lb (88 kg)	Fr	Hendersonville, Tennessee
G	24	Justin Hare	6 ft 2 in (1.88 m)	195 lb (88 kg)	So	Cleveland, Tennessee
F	25	Patrick Brand	6 ft 5 in (1.96 m)	225 lb (102 kg)	Fr	Indianapolis, Indiana
F	30	Matthew Dotson	6 ft 8 in (2.03 m)	220 lb (100 kg)	Fr	Centerville, Tennessee
C	32	Boomer Herndon	6 ft 10 in (2.08 m)	255 lb (116 kg)	Jr	Nashville, Tennessee
F	33	Will Peeples	6 ft 5 in (1.96 m)	220 lb (100 kg)	Fr	Little Rock, Arkansas
G	40	Henry Harris	6 ft 1 in (1.85 m)	170 lb (77 kg)	Fr	Nashville, Tennessee
C	45	Andrew Preston	6 ft 10 in (2.08 m)	210 lb (95 kg)	Jr	Winchester, Kentucky

Head coach

- Rick Byrd (Tennessee)

Assistant coach(es)

- Casey Alexander (Belmont)
- Brian Ayers (Lipscomb)
- Roger Idstrom (Mars Hill)

Legend

- (C) Team captain
- (S) Suspended
- (I) Ineligible
- (W) Walk-on
- Injured
- Current redshirt

Roster

== Schedule and results ==
Date time, TV	Rank^{#}	Opponent^{#}	Result	Record	Site city, state
Regular season
Nov 26, 2005*		at No. 5 Oklahoma	L 59–81	2–1	Lloyd Noble Center; Norman, Oklahoma
Dec 14, 2005*		at Ohio State	L 75–85	3–4	Value City Arena; Columbus, Ohio
Atlantic Sun tournament
Mar 2, 2006*		vs. Campbell; Quarterfinals	W 90–76	18–10	Memorial Center; Johnson City, Tennessee
Mar 3, 2006*		vs. Stetson; Semifinals	W 72–59	19–10	Memorial Center; Johnson City, Tennessee
Mar 4, 2006*		vs. Lipscomb; Championship game	W 74–69 ^{OT}	20–10	Memorial Center; Johnson City, Tennessee
NCAA tournament
Mar 16, 2006*	(15 OAK)	vs. (2 OAK) No. 7 UCLA; First round	L 44–78	20–11	Cox Arena; San Diego, California
*Non-conference game. ^{#}Rankings from AP Poll. (#) Tournament seedings in parentheses.
