= List of UCLA Bruins men's basketball seasons =

This is a list of the seasons completed by the UCLA Bruins men's basketball team.

== Seasons ==
Statistics overview
Season	Coach	Overall	Conference	Standing	Postseason
Fred W. Cozens (SCIAC) (1919–1921)
1919–20	Fred Cozens	12–2	8–2	2nd	
1920–21	Fred Cozens	9–2	9–0	1st	
Fred Cozens:		21–4	17–2		
Pierce "Caddy" Works (SCIAC) (1921–1927)
1921–22	Caddy Works	9–1	9–1	1st	
1922–23	Caddy Works	12–4	9–1	1st	
1923–24	Caddy Works	8–2	8–2	2nd	
1924–25	Caddy Works	11–6	9–1	1st	
1925–26	Caddy Works	14–2	10–0	1st	
1926–27	Caddy Works	12–4	9–1	1st	
Pierce "Caddy" Works (Pacific Coast Conference) (1927–1939)
1927–28	Caddy Works	10–5	5–4	3rd (South)	
1928–29	Caddy Works	7–9	1–8	4th (South)	
1929–30	Caddy Works	14–8	3–6	3rd (South)	
1930–31	Caddy Works	9–6	4–5	3rd (South)	
1931–32	Caddy Works	9–10	4–7	3rd (South)	
1932–33	Caddy Works	10–11	1–10	4th (South)	
1933–34	Caddy Works	10–13	2–10	4th (South)	
1934–35	Caddy Works	11–12	4–8	3rd (South)	
1935–36	Caddy Works	10–13	2–10	4th (South)	
1936–37	Caddy Works	6–15	2–10	4th (South)	
1937–38	Caddy Works	4–20	0–12	4th (South)	
1938–39	Caddy Works	7–20	0–12	4th (South)	
Caddy Works:		173–161	82–108		
Wilbur Johns (Pacific Coast Conference) (1939–1948)
1939–40	Wilbur Johns	8–17	3–9	4th (South)	
1940–41	Wilbur Johns	6–20	2–10	4th (South)	
1941–42	Wilbur Johns	5–18	2–10	4th (South)	
1942–43	Wilbur Johns	14–7	4–4	2nd (South)	
1943–44	Wilbur Johns	10–10	3–3	2nd (South)	
1944–45	Wilbur Johns	12–12	3–1	1st (South)	
1945–46	Wilbur Johns	8–16	5–7	3rd (South)	
1946–47	Wilbur Johns	18–7	9–3	1st (South)	
1947–48	Wilbur Johns	12–13	3–9	3rd (South)	
Wilbur Johns:		93–120	34–56		
John Wooden (Pacific Coast Conference) (1948–1959)
1948–49	John Wooden	22–7	10–2	1st (South)	
1949–50	John Wooden	24–7	10–2	1st (South)	NCAA Elite Eight
1950–51	John Wooden	19–10	9–4	1st (South)	
1951–52	John Wooden	19–12	8–4	1st (South)	NCAA Sweet Sixteen
1952–53	John Wooden	16–8	6–6	3rd (South)	
1953–54	John Wooden	18–7	7–5	2nd (South)	
1954–55	John Wooden	21–5	11–1	1st (South)	
1955–56	John Wooden	22–6	16–0	1st	NCAA Sweet Sixteen
1956–57	John Wooden	22–4	13–3	2nd	
1957–58	John Wooden	16–10	10–6	3rd	
1958–59	John Wooden	16–9	10–6	3rd	
John Wooden (Pacific–8 Conference) (1959–1975)
1959–60	John Wooden	14–12	7–5	2nd	
1960–61	John Wooden	18–8	7–5	2nd	
1961–62	John Wooden	18–11	10–2	1st	NCAA University Division Fourth Place
1962–63	John Wooden	20–9	8–5	1st	NCAA University Division Sweet Sixteen
1963–64	John Wooden	30–0	15–0	1st	NCAA University Division Champion
1964–65	John Wooden	28–2	14–0	1st	NCAA University Division Champion
1965–66	John Wooden	18–8	10–4	2nd	
1966–67	John Wooden	30–0	14–0	1st	NCAA University Division Champion
1967–68	John Wooden	29–1	14–0	1st	NCAA University Division Champion
1968–69	John Wooden	29–1	13–1	1st	NCAA University Division Champion
1969–70	John Wooden	28–2	12–2	1st	NCAA University Division Champion
1970–71	John Wooden	29–1	14–0	1st	NCAA University Division Champion
1971–72	John Wooden	30–0	14–0	1st	NCAA University Division Champion
1972–73	John Wooden	30–0	14–0	1st	NCAA University Division Champion
1973–74	John Wooden	26–4	12–2	1st	NCAA Division I Third Place
1974–75	John Wooden	28–3	12–2	1st	NCAA Division I Champion
John Wooden:		620–147	300–67		
Gene Bartow (Pacific–8 Conference) (1975–1977)
1975–76	Gene Bartow	27–5^{[Note A]}	12–2	1st	NCAA Division I Third Place
1976–77	Gene Bartow	24–5	11–3	1st	NCAA Division I Sweet Sixteen
Gene Bartow:		52–9	23–5		
Gary Cunningham (Pacific–8/Pacific–10 Conference) (1977–1979)
1977–78	Gary Cunningham	25–3	14–0	1st	NCAA Division I Sweet Sixteen
1978–79	Gary Cunningham	25–5	15–3	1st	NCAA Division I Elite Eight
Gary Cunningham:		50–8	29–3		
Larry Brown (Pacific–10 Conference) (1979–1981)
1979–80	Larry Brown	22–10^{[Note B]}	12–6	4th	NCAA Division I Runner–up^{[Note B]}
1980–81	Larry Brown	20–7	13–5	3rd	NCAA Division I second round
Larry Brown:		42–17	25–11		
Larry Farmer (Pacific–10 Conference) (1981–1984)
1981–82	Larry Farmer	21–6	14–4	2nd	
1982–83	Larry Farmer	23–6	15–3	1st	NCAA Division I second round
1983–84	Larry Farmer	17–11	10–8	4th	
Larry Farmer:		61–23	39–15		
Walt Hazzard (Pacific–10 Conference) (1984–1988)
1984–85	Walt Hazzard	21–12	12–6	3rd	NIT Champion
1985–86	Walt Hazzard	15–14	9–9	4th	NIT first round
1986–87	Walt Hazzard	25–7	14–4	1st	NCAA Division I second round
1987–88	Walt Hazzard	16–14	12–6	2nd	
Walt Hazzard:		77–47	47–25		
Jim Harrick (Pacific–10 Conference) (1988–1996)
1988–89	Jim Harrick	21–10	13–5	3rd	NCAA Division I second round
1989–90	Jim Harrick	22–11	11–7	4th	NCAA Division I Sweet Sixteen
1990–91	Jim Harrick	23–9	11–7	2nd	NCAA Division I first round
1991–92	Jim Harrick	28–5	16–2	1st	NCAA Division I Elite Eight
1992–93	Jim Harrick	22–11	11–7	3rd	NCAA Division I second round
1993–94	Jim Harrick	21–7	13–5	2nd	NCAA Division I first round
1994–95	Jim Harrick	31–2^{[Note C]}	16–2^{[Note C]}	1st	NCAA Division I Champion
1995–96	Jim Harrick	23–8	16–2	1st	NCAA Division I first round
Jim Harrick:		191–63	107–37		
Steve Lavin (Pacific–10 Conference) (1996–2003)
1996–97	Steve Lavin	24–8	15–3	1st	NCAA Division I Elite Eight
1997–98	Steve Lavin	24–9	12–6	3rd	NCAA Division I Sweet Sixteen
1998–99	Steve Lavin	22–9	12–6	3rd	NCAA Division I first round
1999–00	Steve Lavin	21–12	10–8	4th	NCAA Division I Sweet Sixteen
2000–01	Steve Lavin	23–9	14–4	3rd	NCAA Division I Sweet Sixteen
2001–02	Steve Lavin	21–12	11–7	6th	NCAA Division I Sweet Sixteen
2002–03	Steve Lavin	10–19	6–12	6th	
Steve Lavin:		145–78	80–46		
Ben Howland (Pacific–10/12 Conference) (2003–2013)
2003–04	Ben Howland	11–17	7–11	7th	
2004–05	Ben Howland	18–11	11–7	3rd	NCAA Division I first round
2005–06	Ben Howland	32–7	14–4	1st	NCAA Division I Runner–up
2006–07	Ben Howland	30–6	15–3	1st	NCAA Division I Final Four
2007–08	Ben Howland	35–4	16–2	1st	NCAA Division I Final Four
2008–09	Ben Howland	26–9	13–5	2nd	NCAA Division I second round
2009–10	Ben Howland	14–18	8–10	5th	
2010–11	Ben Howland	23–11	13–5	2nd	NCAA Division I second round
2011–12	Ben Howland	19–14	11–7	6th	
2012–13	Ben Howland	25–10	13–5	1st	NCAA Division I first round
Ben Howland:		233–107	121–59		
Steve Alford (Pac–12 Conference) (2013–2019)
2013–14	Steve Alford	28–9	12–6	2nd	NCAA Division I Sweet Sixteen
2014–15	Steve Alford	22–14	11–7	4th	NCAA Division I Sweet Sixteen
2015–16	Steve Alford	15–17	6–12	10th	
2016–17	Steve Alford	31–5	15–3	3rd	NCAA Division I Sweet Sixteen
2017–18	Steve Alford	21–12	11–7	T–3rd	NCAA Division I First Four
2018–19	Steve Alford; Murry Bartow	7–6^{[Note D]} 10–10	0–0^{[Note D]} 9–9	7th	
Steve Alford:		134–73^{[Note E]}	64–44^{[Note E]}		
Mick Cronin (Pac–12 Conference) (2019–2024)
2019–20	Mick Cronin	19–12	12–6	2nd	No postseason held
2020–21	Mick Cronin	22–10	13–6	4th	NCAA Division I Final Four
2021–22	Mick Cronin	27–8	15–5	2nd	NCAA Division I Sweet Sixteen
2022–23	Mick Cronin	31–6	16–2	1st	NCAA Division I Sweet Sixteen
2023–24	Mick Cronin	16–17	10–10	5th	
(Big Ten Conference) (2024–present)
2024–25	Mick Cronin	23–11	13–7	4th	NCAA Division I second round
2025–26	Mick Cronin	24–12	13–7	T–6th	NCAA Division I second round
Mick Cronin:		162–76	92–43		
Total:		2,054–933			
National champion Postseason invitational champion Conference regular season champion Conference regular season and conference tournament champion Division regular season champion Division regular season and conference tournament champion Conference tournament champion

^A. Loss later forfeited by Oregon State.
^B. Runner–up finish vacated due to use of ineligible players
^C. Loss later forfeited by California
^D. Steve Alford coached the first 13 games of the season, going 7–6. Interim coach Murry Bartow went 10–10 and 9–9 in conference.
^E. Includes 10–10 record by interim coach Murry Bartow and 9–9 record in conference.
