= 1923–24 Southern Branch Grizzlies men's basketball team =

American college basketball season

1923–24 Southern Branch Grizzlies men's basketball
- Conference: Southern California Intercollegiate Athletic Conference
- Record: 8–2 (8–2 SCIAC)
- Head coach: Caddy Works (3rd season)
- Assistant coach: Albert Dowden

The 1923–24 Southern Branch Grizzlies men's basketball team represented the Southern Branch of the University of California during the 1923–24 NCAA men's basketball season and were members of the Southern California Intercollegiate Athletic Conference. The Grizzlies were led by second year head coach Pierce "Caddy" Works and finished the regular season with a record of 8–2 and were second in their conference with a record of 8–2.

== Previous season ==
The 1921–22 Southern Branch Cubs finished with a record of 8–2 and were second in their conference with a record of 8–2 under second year coach Caddy Works.

== Roster ==
1923–24 UCLA Bruins men's basketball team
Players
Coaches

Pos.	#	Name	Height	Weight	Year	Hometown
G		Horace Bresee	5 ft 11 in (1.8 m)	165 lb (75 kg)	So
C		Willard Goertz (C)	6 ft 1 in (1.85 m)	170 lb (77 kg)	So
F		Wilbur Johns	5 ft 8 in (1.73 m)	130 lb (59 kg)	Jr
		Stan McAulay	—	—
F		Morris Parker	—	—
F		Franklin Pierce	5 ft 11 in (1.8 m)	158 lb (72 kg)	So
C		Tom Scott	—	—

Head coach

Caddy Works

Assistant coach(es)

- Albert Dowden

Legend

- (C) Team captain
- (S) Suspended
- (I) Ineligible
- (W) Walk-on
- Injured
- Current redshirt

Roster
Last update: 30 January 2018

== Schedule ==
Date time, TV	Rank^{#}	Opponent^{#}	Result	Record	Site city, state
Regular Season
January 12, 1924		Caltech	W 51–20	1–0 (1–0)	Los Angeles, CA
January 19, 1924		at Redlands	W 24–17	2–0 (2–0)	Redlands, CA
January 26, 1924		Occidental	W 41–9	3–0 (3–0)	Los Angeles, CA
February 9, 1924		Pomona	W 32–24	4–0 (4–0)	Los Angeles, CA
February 13, 1924		at Caltech	W 46–24	5–0 (5–0)	Pasadena YMCA; Pasadena, CA
February 17, 1924		Redlands	W 28–23	6–0 (6–0)	Los Angeles, CA
February 20, 1924		at Occidental	W 20–14	7–0 (7–0)	Los Angeles, CA
February 27, 1924		at Whittier	L 20–22	7–1 (7–1)	Whittier, CA
March 1, 1924		at Pomona	W 29–21	8–1 (8–1)	Pomona, CA
March 5, 1924		Whittier	L 21–23	8–2 (8–2)	USC Pavilion; Los Angeles, CA
*Non-conference game. ^{#}Rankings from AP Poll. (#) Tournament seedings in parentheses. All times are in Pacific Time.
