= 1924–25 Southern Branch Grizzlies men's basketball team =

American college basketball season

1924–25 Southern Branch Grizzlies men's basketball

SCIAC champion
- Conference: Southern California Intercollegiate Athletic Conference
- Record: 11–6 (9–1 SCIAC)
- Head coach: Caddy Works (4th season)
- Assistant coach: Silas Gibbs

The 1924–25 Southern Branch Grizzlies men's basketball team represented the Southern Branch of the University of California during the 1924–25 NCAA men's basketball season and were members of the Southern California Intercollegiate Athletic Conference. The Grizzlies were led by fourth year head coach Pierce "Caddy" Works and finished the regular season with a record of 11–6 and were champions of their conference with a record of 9–0.

== Previous season ==
The 1923–24 Southern Branch Grizzlies finished with a conference record of 8–2 and finished second in their conference under third year coach Caddy Works. To signify the growth of the university, the southern branch adopted the 'Grizzlies' mascot.

== Roster ==
1924–25 UCLA Bruins men's basketball team
Players
Coaches

Pos.	#	Name	Height	Weight	Year	Hometown
G		James Armstrong	5 ft 11 in (1.8 m)	165 lb (75 kg)	So
F		David Brees	5 ft 9 in (1.75 m)	158 lb (72 kg)
G		Horace Bresee	5 ft 11 in (1.8 m)	165 lb (75 kg)	Jr
G		Ralph Bunche	5 ft 9 in (1.75 m)	153 lb (69 kg)	So
C		Willard Goertz	6 ft 1 in (1.85 m)	170 lb (77 kg)	Jr
F		Wilbur Johns	5 ft 8 in (1.73 m)	130 lb (59 kg)
F		Franklyn Pierce	5 ft 11 in (1.8 m)	158 lb (72 kg)	Jr
C		Edward Prigge	6 ft 3 in (1.91 m)	172 lb (78 kg)	So
F		Norris Woodward	5 ft 10 in (1.78 m)	132 lb (60 kg)

Head coach

Caddy Works

Assistant coach(es)

- Silas Gibbs (UCLA)

Legend

- (C) Team captain
- (S) Suspended
- (I) Ineligible
- (W) Walk-on
- Injured
- Current redshirt

Roster
Last update: 30 January 2018

== Schedule ==
Date time, TV	Rank^{#}	Opponent^{#}	Result	Record	Site city, state
Regular Season
December 20, 1924*		La Verne	W 54–11	1–0	Manual Arts High School Gym; Los Angeles, CA
December 27, 1924*		San Diego State	W 53–33	2–0	Manual Arts High School; Los Angeles, CA
December 30, 1924*		Oregon Agricultural College	L 15–20	2–1	Manual Arts High School Gym; Los Angeles, CA
January 3, 1925		at Caltech	W 29–19	3–1 (1–0)	Pasadena, CA
January 10, 1925		Redlands	W 48–5	4–1 (2–0)	Manual Arts High School Gym; Los Angeles, CA
January 17, 1925*		Stanford	L 17–23	4–2	Manual Arts High School Gym; Los Angeles, CA
January 24, 1925		Whittier	W 32–11	5–2 (3–0)	Manual Arts High School Gym; Los Angeles, CA
January 30, 1925		at Pomona	W 31–18	6–2 (4–0)	Claremont, CA
January 31, 1925		Pomona	W 29–14	7–2 (5–0)	Manual Arts High School Gym; Los Angeles, CA
February 2, 1925*		at Stanford	L 10–23	7–3	Stanford, CA
February 4, 1925*		at California	L 24–33	7–4	Harmon Gym; Berkeley, CA
February 6, 1925*		vs. San Francisco Olympic Club	L 21–25	7–5	Harmon Gym; Berkeley, CA
February 7, 1925		Caltech	W 30–20	8–5 (6–0)	Manual Arts High School; Los Angeles, CA
February 13, 1925		at Redlands	W 31–16	9–5 (7–0)	Redlands, CA
February 20, 1925		Occidental	W 36–20	10–5 (8–0)	Manual Arts High School Gym; Los Angeles, CA
February 21, 1925		at Occidental	L 23–24	10–6 (8–1)	Franklin High School; Los Angeles, CA
February 28, 1925		at Whittier	W 22–15	11–6 (9–1)	Whittier, CA
*Non-conference game. ^{#}Rankings from AP Poll. (#) Tournament seedings in parentheses. All times are in Pacific Time.
