= 1922–23 Southern Branch Cubs men's basketball team =

American college basketball season

1922–23 Southern Branch Cubs men's basketball

SCIAC champion
- Conference: Southern California Intercollegiate Athletic Conference
- Record: 12–4 (9–1 SCIAC)
- Head coach: Caddy Works (2nd season)

The 1922–23 Southern Branch Cubs men's basketball team represented the Southern Branch of the University of California during the 1922–23 NCAA men's basketball season and were members of the Southern California Intercollegiate Athletic Conference. The cubs were led by second year head coach Pierce "Caddy" Works and played in the women's gym. They finished the regular season with a record of 12–4 and were conference champions with a record of 9–1.

== Previous season ==
The 1921–22 Southern Branch Cubs finished with an official record of 9–1 and won the conference championship under first year coach Caddy Works.

== Roster ==
1922–23 UCLA Bruins men's basketball team
Players
Coaches

Pos.	#	Name	Height	Weight	Year	Hometown
G		Corroll Beeson (C)	—	—
G		Horace Bresee	—	—
F		Cyril Eaton	—	—
F		Silas Gibbs	—	—
C		Willard Goertz	6 ft 1 in (1.85 m)	170 lb (77 kg)	Fr
F		Clarence Hoppenyan	—	—
F		Wilbur Johns	5 ft 8 in (1.73 m)	130 lb (59 kg)	So
G		Max Rogers	—	—
G/F		Howard Rossell	—	—

Head coach

Caddy Works

Assistant coach(es)

Legend

- (C) Team captain
- (S) Suspended
- (I) Ineligible
- (W) Walk-on
- Injured
- Current redshirt

Roster
Last update: 30 January 2018

== Schedule ==
Date time, TV	Rank^{#}	Opponent^{#}	Result	Record	Site city, state
Regular Season
January 12, 1923		at Caltech	W 40–15	1–0 (1–0)	Pasadena YMCA; Pasadena, CA
January 19, 1923		Redlands	W 34–21	2–0 (2–0)	Women's Gym; Los Angeles, CA
January 27, 1923		Occidental	W 33–11	3–0 (3–0)	Franklin High School Gymnasium; Los Angeles, CA
January 29, 1923*		California	L 15–47	3–1	Women's Gym; Los Angeles, CA
January 29, 1923*		California (Under 145 pounds) (Note: This game was an under-145 pound match. It is not listed as a varsity match in either school's record books but still claimed by UCLA as a victory that season.)	W 39–32	4–1	Women's Gym; Los Angeles, CA
February 3, 1923		Whittier	W 40–11	5–1 (4–0)	Women's Gym; Los Angeles, CA
February 10, 1923		at Pomona	W 27–18	6–1 (5–0)	Claremont, CA
February 14, 1923		Caltech	W 42–13	7–1 (6–0)	Women's Gym; Los Angeles, CA
February 17, 1923		at Redlands	L 24–26	7–2 (6–1)	Redlands, CA
February 19, 1923*		Arizona	W 43–30	8–2	Women's Gym; Los Angeles, CA
February 20, 1923*		Arizona	L 22–33	8–3	Women's Gym; Los Angeles, CA
February 24, 1923		Occidental	W 61–12	9–3 (7–1)	Women's Gym; Los Angeles, CA
February 25, 1923*		at Arizona	W 43–30	10–3	Tucson, AZ
February 26, 1923*		at Arizona	L 22–32	10–4	Tucson, AZ
March 3, 1923		Pomona	W 38–27	11–4 (8–1)	Women's Gym; Los Angeles, CA
March 8, 1923		at Whittier	W 37–27	12–4 (9–1)	Whittier, CA
*Non-conference game. ^{#}Rankings from AP Poll. (#) Tournament seedings in parentheses. All times are in Pacific Time.
