= 1926–27 Southern Branch Grizzlies men's basketball team =

American college basketball season

1926–27 Southern Branch Grizzlies men's basketball

SCIAC champion
- Conference: Southern California Intercollegiate Athletic Conference
- Record: 12–4 (9–1 Southern California Intercollegiate Athletic Conference)
- Head coach: Caddy Works (6th season)
- Assistant coach: Silas Gibbs
- Home arena: Grand Olympic Auditorium

The 1926–27 Southern Branch Grizzlies men's basketball team represented the Southern Branch of the University of California during the 1926–27 NCAA men's basketball season and were members of the Southern California Intercollegiate Athletic Conference. The Grizzlies were led by sixth year head coach Pierce "Caddy" Works. They finished the regular season with a record of 12–4, and were champions of their conference with a record of 9–1.

== Previous season ==
The 1925–26 Southern Branch Grizzlies finished with a conference record of 14–2 and won their conference with a record of 10–0 under third year head coach Caddy Works.

== Roster ==
1926–27 UCLA Bruins men's basketball team
Players
Coaches

Pos.	#	Name	Height	Weight	Year	Hometown
G		James Armstrong (C)	5 ft 11 in (1.8 m)	165 lb (75 kg)	Sr
F		Sam Balter	—	—
G		Julius Blum	—	—	Sr
G		Ralph Bunche	5 ft 9 in (1.75 m)	153 lb (69 kg)	Sr	Detroit, Michigan
		Robert Hawkins	—	—
F		Jack Ketchum	—	—	Jr
		Ralph Landes	—	—	So	Detroit, Michigan
		Julius Leavy	—	—
		Al Sunseri	—	—
F		Arthur Williams	—	—	Jr
C		William Woodroof	—	—
C		Milo Young	—	—

Head coach

Caddy Works

Assistant coach(es)

- Silas Gibbs (UCLA)
- Wilbur Johns (UCLA)

Legend

- (C) Team captain
- (S) Suspended
- (I) Ineligible
- (W) Walk-on
- Injured
- Current redshirt

Roster
Last update: 30 January 2018

== Schedule ==
Date time, TV	Rank^{#}	Opponent^{#}	Result	Record	Site city, state
Regular Season
December 11, 1926*		at Hollywood Athletic Club	L 28–36	0–1	Hollywood Athletic Club; Hollywood, CA
December 18, 1926*		at Pacific Coast Club	L 17–28	0–2	Long Beach, CA
December 29, 1926*		Oregon Agriculture College	W 32–22	1–2	Grand Olympic Auditorium; Los Angeles, CA
December 31, 1926*		Idaho	L 17–32	1–3	Los Angeles Athletic Club; Los Angeles, CA
January 3, 1927*		at Stanford	W 21–17	2–3	Stanford Pavilion; Stanford, CA
January 7, 1927		at Occidental	W 32–17	3–3 (1–0)	Los Angeles, CA
January 14, 1927		San Diego State	W 31–9	4–3 (2–0)	Hollywood High School Gym; Los Angeles, CA
January 15, 1927		San Diego State	W 28–19	5–3 (3–0)	Hollywood High School Gym; Los Angeles, CA
January 21, 1927		at Caltech	W 24–16	6–3 (4–0)	Pasadena, CA
January 22, 1927*		Stanford	W 23–21	7–3	Grand Olympic Auditorium; Los Angeles, CA
January 28, 1927		at Pomona	W 48–13	8–3 (5–0)	Claremont, CA
February 5, 1927		Occidental	W 28–14	9–3 (6–0)	Hollywood High School Gym; Hollywood, CA
February 12, 1927		at Redlands	W 42–26	10–3 (7–0)	Redlands, CA
February 19, 1927		Pomona	W 42–16	11–3 (8–0)	Olympic Auditorium; Los Angeles, CA
February 21, 1927		Whittier	L 22–31	11–4 (8–1)	Olympic Auditorium; Los Angeles, CA
February 26, 1927		at Whittier	W 29–23	12–4 (9–1)	Whittier, CA
*Non-conference game. ^{#}Rankings from AP Poll. (#) Tournament seedings in parentheses. All times are in Pacific Time.
