= Ben Howland =

American basketball coach (born 1957)

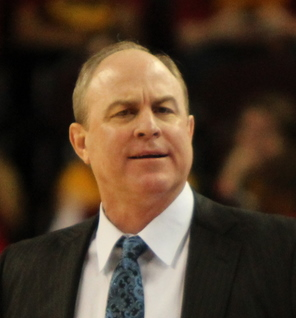
- Howland with UCLA in 2012

Biographical details
- Born: May 28, 1957 (age 69); Lebanon, Oregon, U.S.

Playing career
- 1976–1978: Santa Barbara CC
- 1978–1980: Weber State
- Position: Guard

Coaching career (HC unless noted)
- 1981–1982: Gonzaga (assistant)
- 1982–1994: UC Santa Barbara (assistant)
- 1994–1999: Northern Arizona
- 1999–2003: Pittsburgh
- 2003–2013: UCLA
- 2015–2022: Mississippi State

Head coaching record
- Overall: 533–306

Accomplishments and honors

Championships
- 3 NCAA Regional – Final Four (2006–2008); 2 Big Sky regular season (1997, 1998); Big Sky tournament (1998); 2 Big East regular season (2002, 2003); Big East tournament (2003); 4 Pac-10 regular season (2006–2008, 2013); 2 Pac-10 tournament (2006, 2008)

Awards
- Henry Iba Award (2002); Naismith College Coach of the Year (2002); Jim Phelan Award (2006); Big Sky Coach of the Year (1997); Big East Coach of the Year (2002); Pac-10 Coach of the Year (2006)

Benjamin Clark Howland (born May 28, 1957) is an American college basketball coach who most recently served as the men's head coach at Mississippi State University from to 2015 to 2022. He served as the head men's basketball coach at Northern Arizona University from 1994 to 1999, the University of Pittsburgh from 1999 to 2003, and the University of California, Los Angeles (UCLA) from 2003 to 2013. Howland became the first men's coach in modern college basketball history to be fired shortly after winning an outright power-conference title. He is one of the few NCAA Division I coaches to take four teams to the NCAA tournament.

== Early years and playing career ==
Born in Lebanon, Oregon, Howland first attended Dos Pueblos High School in Goleta, California, for a year then transferred to Cerritos High School in Cerritos, where he earned his diploma. While at Cerritos, he was a two-time All-CIF and two-time Suburban League Most Valuable Player in basketball.

After high school, Howland played college basketball for Santa Barbara City College then transferred to Weber State College in Ogden, Utah, a member of the Big Sky Conference. Known as a defensive specialist, he later played professional basketball in Uruguay.

He earned a bachelor's degree in physical education at Weber State and a master's degree in administration at Gonzaga University in Spokane, Washington.

=== Playing career ===
- 1972–73: Dos Pueblos High School, Goleta, California
- 1973–76: Cerritos High School, Cerritos, California
- 1976–78: Santa Barbara City College, led the Vaqueros to California State finals in 1978.
- 1978–80: Weber State College, named WSC's defensive MVP both years and led Wildcats to consecutive Big Sky titles and NCAA tournament appearances in 1979 and 1980.
- 1980: Played professionally in Bohemios First Division Uruguay, South America.

== Coaching career ==
=== Early head coaching career ===
Howland wanted to be a coach since his teenage years living in Santa Barbara. At age 24, he became a graduate assistant at Gonzaga. His childhood friend Jay Hillock, the new head coach, recruited Howland. At Gonzaga, one of Howland's duties was to guard future basketball Hall of Famer John Stockton in practice.

After a year at Gonzaga, Howland got his first paid coaching job at the University of California, Santa Barbara (1982–1994) as an assistant to Ed DeLacy. After Jerry Pimm replaced DeLacy in 1983, Howland helped Pimm lead the Gauchos to five postseason appearances between 1988 and 1994. Starting in 1992, Howland applied for head coaching jobs at UC Irvine and Loyola Marymount University but was turned down both times.

Howland's first head coaching job was at Northern Arizona University (1994–99) in Flagstaff. Under Howland, Northern Arizona captured the Big Sky Conference Championship in the 1996–97 season. He then led the Lumberjacks to the Big Sky tournament Championship the following year, sending them to the NCAA tournament for the first time in school history. While at NAU, he was considered for head coaching jobs at UC Irvine again and at UCSB, but again was turned down.

He later ended up replacing Ralph Willard at the University of Pittsburgh, a member of the Big East Conference. While at Pittsburgh, Howland rebuilt the Panthers basketball program and earned an NIT bid his second season, followed by back-to-back Big East regular-season conference titles and NCAA Sweet Sixteen appearances. He also took Pitt to three straight Big East Championship games, winning the 2003 tournament title, the first in school history. In 2002, Howland also earned several national coach-of-the-year awards. Howland's win–loss record at Pitt was 89–40 (.690) with four consecutive post-season bids.

=== UCLA ===
Despite some success under the watch of Steve Lavin, the program wanted to regain its position in the college basketball upper echelon. Even the success in the NCAA tournament belied the fact that UCLA had earned no better than a number 4 seed with the exception of the 1997 season. The 2002–03 season turned out to be the back-breaker for Lavin as the Bruins stumbled to a 10–19 record and a 6–12 record in the conference. It was the first losing season for UCLA in over five decades. Lavin was dismissed following the season.

UCLA looked to find a coach that could move the Bruins back to the elite ranks of the Pac-10 and the country. Howland's success at the University of Pittsburgh and his southern California roots made him an attractive candidate. In 2003, he accepted the only job he said he would ever contemplate leaving Pitt for: the head coaching duties at UCLA. UCLA athletic director Dan Guerrero, who declined to hire Howland at UC Irvine in 1997, felt that Howland's Big East style of basketball, characterized by a slow down offense and lock-down man on man defense, would vault the program to the top of the Pac-10. However, Howland came into a program at the bottom of the Pac-10 with a roster not suited to his style. In his first season the club finished 11–17 and 7–11 in the conference. Howland remedied this disappointment in his recruiting efforts. Howland produced a top tier recruiting class from athletes in southern California that fit his Big East style. Behind Lavin hold-over Dijon Thompson and Howland recruits Jordan Farmar and Arron Afflalo, UCLA produced a winning season for the first time in three years and returned to the tournament. Despite losing in the first round, the foundation had been set for future success.

Starting the 2005–06 season with the majority of the roster made over in Howland's image and with the Lavin hold-overs buying into the system (e.g., Ryan Hollins and Cedric Bozeman) the Bruins produced an excellent campaign. They finished the regular season 24–6, winning the Pac-10 Conference title. They then roared through the Pac-10 tournament, winning each game by double digits en route to only the second Pac-10 tournament championship in school history. The momentum continued into the NCAA tournament as the second-seeded Bruins staged a memorable late-game comeback to defeat Gonzaga in the Sweet Sixteen. They then upset top-seeded Memphis to reach the school's first Final Four in 11 years. The run ended against Florida in the championship game whose imposing front-line proved to be a matchup problem for the Bruins.

At the end of the 2005–2006 season, he received a pay bonus after coaching a successful season.

Howland continued his success at UCLA the following year. The Bruins finished undefeated at home for the first time in 22 years, winning the Pac-10 conference title. However they lost in their first Pac-10 tournament game and were seeded second in the NCAA Tournament West Region. UCLA turned a tight opening into a blowout over Howland's alma mater Weber State in the first round. After a close second-round win over Indiana, Howland led the Bruins to a win over his former team, Pitt, coached by his former assistant, Jamie Dixon, in the Sweet Sixteen. The Bruins then again upset the top seed in the West Region, Kansas, in a classic matchup of two storied basketball programs and reached the second of UCLA's first consecutive Final Fours since the John Wooden era, only to lose again to Florida in the national semifinal.

At the start of the 2007–08 season, expectations for UCLA were highest with the arrival of Kevin Love, one of the best low-post prospects in the high school class of 2007. Combined with the emergence of Russell Westbrook and Darren Collison in the back-court, the Bruins won their 3rd consecutive Pac-10 conference title, and their second Pac-10 tournament title in three years. They received their first #1 seed in the NCAA tournament since 1995, and once again reached the Final Four, where they faced another top seed, the Memphis Tigers. Memphis got the better of the Bruins, who returned to Westwood without a championship once again. The Memphis victory was later vacated after Derrick Rose was retroactively declared ineligible, but such did not change UCLA's 2008 Final Four standing.

With a 77–73 victory over Penn on December 10, 2011; Howland passed Jim Harrick for second on UCLA's all-time wins list behind John Wooden.

In February 2012, a Sports Illustrated article portrayed UCLA player Reeves Nelson as a bully on and off the court, who at times intentionally tried to injure his teammates. The article stated that Howland looked the other way and did not discipline Nelson for over two years. Both UCLA and Howland disputed the story, some as untrue and others as beyond the knowledge of the program. From 2008—the Bruins last Final Four appearance—through 2012, at least 11 players left the UCLA program, including Nelson who was suspended twice and dismissed in December 2011. After 2008, UCLA did not advance past the first weekend of the NCAA tourney, and did not qualify for the tournament in 2010 and 2012. In 2009, Howland pulled a scholarship offer to Kendall Williams, who had verbally committed to attend UCLA in 2010. Several Amateur Athletic Union (AAU) coaches in Southern California thought that Howland delayed notifying Williams to deter other Pac-12 Conference coaches from pursuing him. Wary of Howland, many AAU coaches began advising their top players against playing for the Bruins. After the 2010 recruiting class, Norman Powell was the only one of Howland's 10 recruits who were from Southern California.

Despite the winning, Howland had developed a reputation for coaching a boring brand of basketball. In 2012–13, UCLA landed a recruiting class considered the best in the nation. Jordan Adams was the first to sign, followed by McDonald's All-Americans Shabazz Muhammad, Kyle Anderson and Tony Parker. Howland went to a new up-tempo offense, and the Bruins won the Pac-12 regular-season title. However, their second-leading scorer Adams broke his foot in the Pac-12 Tournament semifinals, and the Bruins were blown out in the first round of the NCAA Tournament. On March 25, 2013, Howland was fired by UCLA. In his 10 years with the Bruins, he had a .685 winning percentage, went to three consecutive Final Fours, and won four Pac-12 conference titles. At Howland's departure, only John Wooden had coached the Bruins to more wins, or in more games.

=== Mississippi State ===
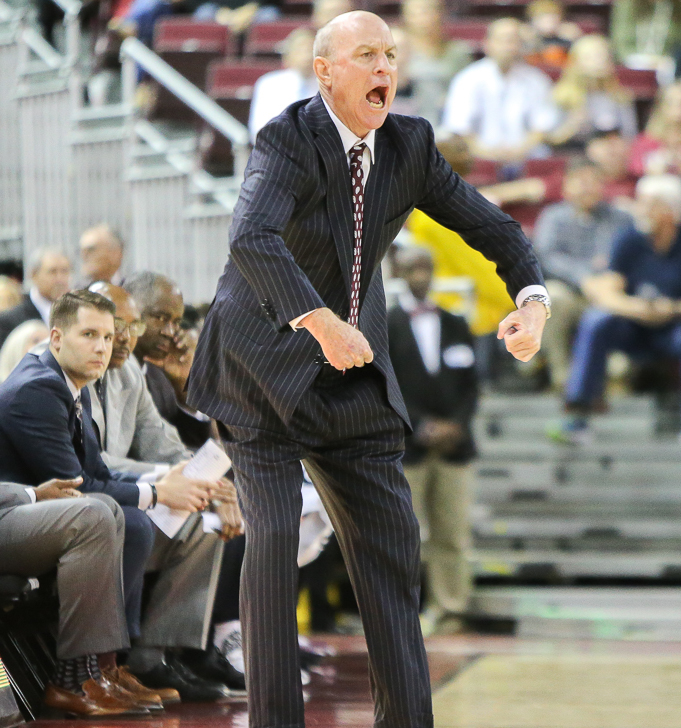
Howland coaching Mississippi State in 2020

On March 24, 2015, Howland was hired as the 20th head coach at Mississippi State University, replacing Rick Ray. The Bulldogs were coming off three straight losing seasons and was in the midst of a six-year drought from the NCAA Tournament. In his first season, Mississippi State finished with a record of 14–17 (7–11 SEC).

In the 2018–19 season, Howland led Mississippi State to a 23–11 record, and their first NCAA tournament appearance since 2009. They would proceed to fall to Liberty 80–76.

On March 17, 2022, Mississippi State announced that Howland had been fired.

== Players in the NBA ==
Ben Howland has coached a number of players who later played professionally in the National Basketball Association (NBA)

- Dan McClintock
- Brandin Knight
- Trevor Ariza
- Dijon Thompson
- Cedric Bozeman
- Ryan Hollins
- Jordan Farmar
- Arron Afflalo
- Russell Westbrook
- Luc Richard Mbah a Moute
- Kevin Love
- Jrue Holiday
- Darren Collison
- Malcolm Lee
- Tyler Honeycutt
- Shabazz Muhammad
- Kyle Anderson
- Jordan Adams
- Travis Wear
- Drew Gordon
- Larry Drew II
- David Wear
- Quinndary Weatherspoon
- Reggie Perry
- Robert Woodard II
- Norman Powell

== Awards ==
- 1997: Big Sky Conference Coach of the Year.
- 2001–02:

Big East Coach of the Year.
National Coach of the Year: AP, Naismith, USBWA, ESPN Magazine, and The Sporting News.
USBWA District Coach of the Year.
Basketball America Big East Coach of the Year.
Basketball Times Big East Coach of the Year.
Pittsburgh Tribune-Review City of Champions Award.

- 2003: Dapper Dan Award, honoring Pittsburgh's Sportsman of the Year.
- 2004: Howland's 1997–98 Northern Arizona club inducted into the Northern Arizona University Athletic Hall of Fame.
- 2005–06:

Pac-10 Coach of the Year.
Collegehoops.net Coach of the Year.

- 2016: Inducted into the Northern Arizona University Athletics Hall of Fame Class of 2016.

== Head coaching record ==
Record table
| Season | Team | Overall | Conference | Standing | Postseason |
|---|---|---|---|---|---|
Northern Arizona Lumberjacks (Big Sky Conference) (1994–1999)
| 1994–95 | Northern Arizona | 9–17 | 4–10 | 7th | |
| 1995–96 | Northern Arizona | 7–19 | 3–11 | 7th | |
| 1996–97 | Northern Arizona | 21–7 | 13–1 | 1st | NIT First Round |
| 1997–98 | Northern Arizona | 21–8 | 12–2 | 1st | NCAA Division I Round of 64 |
| 1998–99 | Northern Arizona | 21–8 | 12–4 | 2nd | |
| Northern Arizona: | | 79–59 (.572) | 44–28 (.611) | | |
Pittsburgh Panthers (Big East Conference) (1999–2003)
| 1999–00 | Pittsburgh | 13–15 | 5–11 | 11th | |
| 2000–01 | Pittsburgh | 19–14 | 7–9 | 5th (West) | NIT Second Round |
| 2001–02 | Pittsburgh | 29–6 | 13–3 | 1st (West) | NCAA Division I Sweet 16 |
| 2002–03 | Pittsburgh | 28–5 | 13–3 | T–1st (West) | NCAA Division I Sweet 16 |
| Pittsburgh: | | 89–40 (.690) | 38–26 (.594) | | |
UCLA Bruins (Pacific-10/Pac-12 Conference) (2003–2013)
| 2003–04 | UCLA | 11–17 | 7–11 | T–7th | |
| 2004–05 | UCLA | 18–11 | 11–7 | T–3rd | NCAA Division I Round of 64 |
| 2005–06 | UCLA | 32–7 | 14–4 | 1st | NCAA Division I Runner-up |
| 2006–07 | UCLA | 30–6 | 15–3 | 1st | NCAA Division I Final Four |
| 2007–08 | UCLA | 35–4 | 16–2 | 1st | NCAA Division I Final Four |
| 2008–09 | UCLA | 26–9 | 13–5 | 2nd | NCAA Division I Round of 32 |
| 2009–10 | UCLA | 14–18 | 8–10 | T–5th | |
| 2010–11 | UCLA | 23–11 | 13–5 | 2nd | NCAA Division I Round of 32 |
| 2011–12 | UCLA | 19–14 | 11–7 | T–5th | |
| 2012–13 | UCLA | 25–10 | 13–5 | 1st | NCAA Division I Round of 64 |
| UCLA: | | 233–107 (.685) | 118–58 (.670) | | |
Mississippi State Bulldogs (Southeastern Conference) (2015–2022)
| 2015–16 | Mississippi State | 14–17 | 7–11 | 11th | |
| 2016–17 | Mississippi State | 16–16 | 6–12 | 12th | |
| 2017–18 | Mississippi State | 25–12 | 9–9 | T–7th | NIT Semifinal |
| 2018–19 | Mississippi State | 23–11 | 10–8 | T–6th | NCAA Division I Round of 64 |
| 2019–20 | Mississippi State | 20–11 | 11–7 | T–4th | No postseason held |
| 2020–21 | Mississippi State | 18–15 | 8–10 | 9th | NIT Runner-up |
| 2021–22 | Mississippi State | 18–16 | 8–10 | 10th | NIT First Round |
| Mississippi State: | | 134–98 (.578) | 59–67 (.468) | | |
| Total: | | 533–306 (.635) | | | |
National champion Postseason invitational champion Conference regular season champion Conference regular season and conference tournament champion Division regular season champion Division regular season and conference tournament champion Conference tournament champion

== See also ==
- List of NCAA Division I Men's Final Four appearances by coach
