= 1920–21 Southern Branch Cubs men's basketball team =

American college basketball season

1920–21 Southern Branch Cubs men's basketball

SCIAC champion
- Conference: Southern California Intercollegiate Athletic Conference
- Record: 9–2 (9–0 SCIAC)
- Head coach: Fred Cozens (2nd season)

The 1920–21 Southern Branch Cubs men's basketball team represented the Southern Branch of the University of California during the 1920–21 NCAA men's basketball season and were members of the Southern California Intercollegiate Athletic Conference. The cubs were led by second year head coach Fred Cozens who also served as Athletic Director. They finished the regular season with a record of 9–2 and were conference champions with a record of 9–0.

== Roster ==
1920–21 UCLA Bruins men's basketball team
Players
Coaches

Pos.	#	Name	Height	Weight	Year	Hometown
		Silas "Si" Gibbs	—	—
		Raymond McBurney (C)	—	—
		Eddie Rossell	—	—
		Al Shepard	—	—
		Sterling Tipton	—	—
		Carlton West	—	—
		Norris Woodard	—	—

Head coach

Fred Cozens (California)

Assistant coach(es)

Legend

- (C) Team captain
- (S) Suspended
- (I) Ineligible
- (W) Walk-on
- Injured
- Current redshirt

Roster

== Schedule ==
Date time, TV	Rank^{#}	Opponent^{#}	Result	Record	Site city, state
Regular Season
January 3, 1921*		California	L 28–36	0–1	Physical Education Building (300); Los Angeles, CA
January 11, 1921*		at Los Angeles Athletic Club (Note: Game is not listed in official record books.)	L 20–36	0–2	Los Angeles Athletic Club; Los Angeles, CA
January 15, 1921		Redlands	W 29–26	1–2 (1–0)	Physical Education Building; Los Angeles, CA
January 18, 1921		Occidental (Note: The game was cancelled because Occidental did not want to play a midweek game.)			
January 22, 1921		at Pomona	W 24–21	2–2 (2–0)	Claremont, CA
January 29, 1921		Caltech	W 32–18	3–2 (3–0)	Physical Education Building; Los Angeles, CA
February 2, 1921		at Redlands	W 26–22	4–2 (4–0)	Redlands, CA
February 5, 1921		at Occidental	W 36–26	5–2 (5–0)	Glendale High School; Glendale, CA
February 10, 1921		Whittier	W 18–16	6–2 (6–0)	Physical Education Building; Los Angeles, CA
February 12, 1921		at Whittier	W 26–24	7–2 (7–0)	Whittier, CA
February 15, 1921		Pomona	W 36–24	8–2 (8–0)	Physical Education Building; Los Angeles, CA
February 19, 1921		at Caltech	W 37–22	9–2 (9–0)	Pasadena YMCA; Pasadena, CA
February 28, 1921*		at California	L 29–46	9–3	Harmon Gym; Berkeley, CA
*Non-conference game. ^{#}Rankings from AP Poll. (#) Tournament seedings in parentheses. All times are in Pacific Time.
