= 1921–22 Southern Branch Cubs men's basketball team =

American college basketball season

1921–22 Southern Branch Cubs men's basketball

SCIAC champion
- Conference: Southern California Intercollegiate Athletic Conference
- Record: 9–1 (9–1 SCIAC)
- Head coach: Caddy Works (1st season)

The 1921–22 Southern Branch Cubs men's basketball team represented the Southern Branch of the University of California during the 1921–22 NCAA men's basketball season and were members of the Southern California Intercollegiate Athletic Conference. The cubs were led by first year head coach Pierce "Caddy" Works. They finished the regular season with a record of 9–1 and were conference champions with a record of 9–1. The Cubs also played non-conference games against Santa Clara Saints and California Golden Bears but these games are not listed in the official record books.

== Previous season ==
The 1921–22 Southern Branch Cubs finished with a record of 9–2 under second year coach Fred Cozens. Cozens stepped downed as head coach at the end of the season and remained as Director of Physical Education at the Southern Branch.

== Roster ==
1921–22 UCLA Bruins men's basketball team
Players
Coaches

Pos.	#	Name	Height	Weight	Year	Hometown
G		Carroll Beeson	—	—
G		Lamar Butler	—	—
F		Cyril Eaton	—	—
F		Silas Gibbs (C)	—	—
		Earl Holmes	—	—
F		Wilbur Johns	5 ft 8 in (1.73 m)	130 lb (59 kg)	Fr
C		Thomas Scott	—	—
F		Freddie Winter	—	—
F		Norris Woodward	—	—

Head coach

Caddy Works

Assistant coach(es)

Legend

- (C) Team captain
- (S) Suspended
- (I) Ineligible
- (W) Walk-on
- Injured
- Current redshirt

Roster
Last update: 30 January 2018

== Schedule ==
Date time, TV	Rank^{#}	Opponent^{#}	Result	Record	Site city, state
Regular Season
December 10, 1921		Caltech	W 30–12	1–0 (1–0)	Physical Education Building; Los Angeles, CA
December 17, 1921		at Redlands	L 24–26	1–1 (1–1)	Redlands, CA
December 27, 1921*		Santa Clara (Note: Game is not listed in official record books.)	L 23–29		Physical Education Building; Los Angeles, CA
January 5, 1922*		California (Note: Game is not listed in official record books.)	L 23–29		Physical Education Building; Los Angeles, CA
January 7, 1922		Occidental	W 33–24	2–1 (2–1)	Physical Education Building; Los Angeles, CA
January 14, 1922		at Whittier	W 29–9	3–1 (3–1)	Whittier, CA
January 21, 1922		Pomona	W 34–22	4–1 (4–1)	Physical Education Building; Los Angeles, CA
January 28, 1922		at Caltech	W 19–17	5–1 (5–1)	Pasadena YMCA; Pasadena, CA
February 4, 1922		Redlands	W 41–19	6–1 (6–1)	Physical Education Building; Los Angeles, CA
February 8, 1922		at Occidental	W 34–14	7–1 (7–1)	Franklin High School Gym; Los Angeles, CA
February 11, 1922		Whittier	W 23–15	8–1 (8–1)	Physical Education Building; Los Angeles, CA
February 18, 1922		at Pomona	W 46–18	9–1 (9–1)	Claremont, CA
*Non-conference game. ^{#}Rankings from AP Poll. (#) Tournament seedings in parentheses. All times are in Pacific Time.
