= Caddy Works =

American basketball and baseball coach

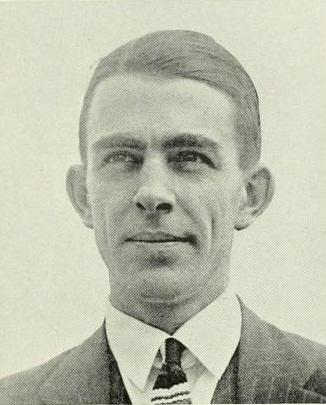
- Works from 1928 UCLA yearbook

Biographical details
- Born: January 2, 1896
- Died: July 19, 1982 (aged 86); Los Angeles, California, U.S.

Playing career

Basketball
- 1916–1917: California
- 1919–1920: California

Baseball
- 1921: Wichita Falls Spudders
- Position: First baseman (baseball)

Coaching career (HC unless noted)

Basketball
- 1921–1939: Southern Branch / UCLA

Baseball
- 1925–1926: Southern Branch

Head coaching record
- Overall: 173–161 (basketball); 23–14 (baseball)

Accomplishments and honors

Championships
- Basketball; 5 SCIAC (1922, 1923, 1925–1927)

Pierce "Caddy" Works (January 2, 1896 – July 19, 1982) was an American basketball and baseball coach. He was the head basketball coach at University of California, Los Angeles (UCLA)—known as the Southern Branch of the University of California until 1927—for 18 seasons, from 1921 to 1939, compiling a record of 173–161. Works was also the head baseball coach at Southern Branch from 1925 to 1926, tallying a mark of 23–14.

Works was a lawyer by profession and coached the team only during the evenings. According to UCLA player and future Olympian Frank Lubin, Works was "more of an honorary coach" with little basketball knowledge.

== Head coaching record ==
=== Basketball ===
Record table
Season	Team	Overall	Conference	Standing	Postseason
Southern Branch Cubs/Grizzlies (Southern California Intercollegiate Athletic Conference) (1921–1927)
1921–22	Southern Branch	9–1	9–1	1st	
1922–23	Southern Branch	12–4	9–1	1st	
1923–24	Southern Branch	8–2	8–2	2nd	
1924–25	Southern Branch	11–6	9–1	1st	
1925–26	Southern Branch	14–2	10–0	1st	
1926–27	Southern Branch	12–4	9–1	1st	
UCLA Bruins (Pacific Coast Conference) (1927–1939)
1927–28	UCLA	10–5	5–4	3rd (South)	
1928–29	UCLA	7–9	1–8	4th (South)	
1929–30	UCLA	14–8	3–6	3rd (South)	
1930–31	UCLA	9–6	4–5	3rd (South)	
1931–32	UCLA	9–10	4–7	3rd (South)	
1932–33	UCLA	10–11	1–10	4th (South)	
1933–34	UCLA	10–13	2–10	4th (South)	
1934–35	UCLA	11–12	4–8	3rd (South)	
1935–36	UCLA	10–13	2–10	4th (South)	
1936–37	UCLA	6–15	2–10	4th (South)	
1937–38	UCLA	4–20	0–12	4th (South)	
1938–39	UCLA	7–20	0–12	4th (South)	
Southern Branch / UCLA:		173–161	82–108		
Total:		173–161			
National champion Postseason invitational champion Conference regular season champion Conference regular season and conference tournament champion Division regular season champion Division regular season and conference tournament champion Conference tournament champion
