= 1925–26 Southern Branch Grizzlies men's basketball team =

American college basketball season

1925–26 Southern Branch Grizzlies men's basketball

SCIAC champion
- Conference: Southern California Intercollegiate Athletic Conference
- Record: 14–2 (8–0 SCIAC)
- Head coach: Caddy Works (5th season)
- Assistant coach: Silas Gibbs
- Home arena: Grand Olympic Auditorium

The 1925–26 Southern Branch Grizzlies men's basketball team represented the Southern Branch of the University of California during the 1925–26 NCAA men's basketball season and were members of the Southern California Intercollegiate Athletic Conference. The Grizzlies were led by fifth year head coach Pierce "Caddy" Works and finished the regular season with a record of 14–2 and were champions of their conference with a record of 10–0.

== Previous season ==
The 1924–25 Southern Branch Grizzlies finished with a conference record of 11–6 and finished won their conference with a record of 10–0 under fourth year head coach Caddy Works.

== Roster ==
1925–26 UCLA Bruins men's basketball team
Players
Coaches

Pos.	#	Name	Height	Weight	Year	Hometown
G		James Armstrong	5 ft 11 in (1.8 m)	165 lb (75 kg)	Jr
F		Julius Blum	—	—	Jr
G		Horace Bresee (C)	5 ft 11 in (1.8 m)	165 lb (75 kg)	Sr
G		Ralph Bunche	5 ft 9 in (1.75 m)	153 lb (69 kg)	Jr	Detroit, Michigan
G		Paul Fruehling	—	—	So
C		Willard Goertz	6 ft 1 in (1.85 m)	170 lb (77 kg)	Sr
F		Jack Ketchum	—	—	So
C		Franklin Pierce	5 ft 11 in (1.8 m)	158 lb (72 kg)	Sr
C		Edward Prigge	6 ft 3 in (1.91 m)	172 lb (78 kg)	Jr
		Walter Treanor	—	—	So
F		Arthur Williams	—	—	So

Head coach

Caddy Works

Assistant coach(es)

- Silas Gibbs (UCLA)

Legend

- (C) Team captain
- (S) Suspended
- (I) Ineligible
- (W) Walk-on
- Injured
- Current redshirt

Roster
Last update: 30 January 2018

== Schedule ==
Date time, TV	Rank^{#}	Opponent^{#}	Result	Record	Site city, state
Regular Season
December 5, 1925*		Los Angeles Athletic Club	W 33–19	1–0	Los Angeles Athletic Club; Los Angeles, CA
December 12, 1925*		at Hollywood Athletic Club	W 27–25	2–0	Hollywood Athletic Club; Hollywood, CA
December 19, 1925*		at San Diego State	W 32–17	3–0	San Diego, CA
December 26, 1925*		Montana State	W 36–21	4–0	Los Angeles Athletic Club; Los Angeles, CA
December 30, 1925*		Oregon Agriculture College	W 32–22	5–0	USC Court; Los Angeles, CA
January 4, 1926*		at Stanford	W 28–15	6–0	Stanford Pavilion; Stanford, CA
January 9, 1926		Redlands	W 32–8	7–0 (1–0)	Los Angeles Athletic Club; Los Angeles, CA
January 16, 1926		at Occidental	W 38–11	8–0 (2–0)	Los Angeles, CA
January 23, 1926		Occidental	W 45–14	9–0 (3–0)	Grand Olympic Auditorium; Los Angeles, CA
January 30, 1926		Pomona	W 37–20	10–0 (4–0)	Grand Olympic Auditorium; Los Angeles, CA
February 5, 1926*		Stanford	L 29–32	10–1	Grand Olympic Auditorium; Los Angeles, CA
February 6, 1926		at Caltech	W 27–21	10–2 (5–0)	Pasadena, CA
February 13, 1926*		California	L 8–22	11–2	Grand Olympic Auditorium; Los Angeles, CA
February 19, 1926		at Whittier	W 29–23	12–2 (6–0)	Whittier, CA
February 20, 1926		Whittier	W 18–14	13–2 (7–0)	Grand Olympic Auditorium; Los Angeles, CA
February 27, 1926		at Redlands	W 46–17	14–2 (8–0)	Redlands, CA
*Non-conference game. ^{#}Rankings from AP Poll. (#) Tournament seedings in parentheses. All times are in Pacific Time.
