= 1919–20 Southern Branch Cubs men's basketball team =

American college basketball season

1919–20 Southern Branch Cubs men's basketball
- Conference: Southern California Intercollegiate Athletic Conference
- Record: 12–2 (8–2 SCIAC)
- Head coach: Fred Cozens (1st season)

The 1919–20 Southern Branch Cubs men's basketball team represented the Southern Branch of the University of California during the 1919–20 NCAA men's basketball season and were members of the Southern California Intercollegiate Athletic Conference (Note: While published sources indicate that the Southern Branch did not join the SCIAC until the 1920–21 season, contemporary sources include the southern branch in the conference's standings during the 1919–20 season.) This was the program's first season and they were coached by Fred Cozens who also coached the football team and served as athletic director. As the southern branch did not offer third year and fourth year coursework until 1924, the roster consisted of first and second year students. In their inaugural season, the Cubs finished with an overall record of 12–2 and were second in their conference with a record of 8–2.

== Previous season ==
Although the Southern Branch's predecessor, the Los Angeles State Normal School, sponsored a men's basketball team, the UCLA recordbooks do not recognize these seasons.

== Roster ==
1919–20 UCLA Bruins men's basketball team
Players
Coaches

Pos.	#	Name	Height	Weight	Year	Hometown
		Silas "Si" Gibbs (C)	—	—
G		Raymond McBurney	—	—
		Eddie Rossell	—	—
		Sterling Tipton	—	—
		Norris Woodard	—	—

Head coach

Fred Cozens (California)

Assistant coach(es)

Legend

- (C) Team captain
- (S) Suspended
- (I) Ineligible
- (W) Walk-on
- Injured
- Current redshirt

Roster

== Schedule ==
Date time, TV	Rank^{#}	Opponent^{#}	Result	Record	Site city, state
Regular Season
December 12, 1919*		Manual Arts High School	W 46–38	1–0	Physical Education Building; Los Angeles, CA
December 19, 1919*		Hollywood High School	W 45–21	2–0	Physical Education Building; Los Angeles, CA
January 5, 1920 *		Los Angeles Poly High School	W 26–22	3–0	Physical Education Building; Los Angeles, CA
January 9, 1920*		at Los Angeles Poly High School	W 21–12	4–0	Los Angeles Poly High School Gym; Los Angeles, CA
January 14, 1920		at Redlands	L 21–34	4–1 (0–1)	Redlands, CA
January 16, 1920		at Occidental	W 41–29	5–1 (1–1)	Glendale High School Gym; Glendale, CA
January 20, 1920		Pomona	W 44–29	6–1 (2–1)	Physical Education Building; Los, Angeles, CA
January 24, 1920		at Whittier	W 33–23	7–1 (3–1)	Whittier, CA
January 27, 1920		Throop	W 36–25	8–1 (4–1)	Physical Education Building; Los Angeles, CA
January 30, 1920		Occidental	W 43–30	9–1 (5–1)	Physical Education Building; Los Angeles, CA
February 7, 1920		at Pomona	W 33–30	10–1 (6–1)	Claremont, CA
February 11, 1920		Whittier	W 33–21	11–1 (7–1)	Physical Education Building; Los Angeles, CA
February 14, 1920		at Throop	L 30–41	11–2 (7–2)	Pasadena YMCA; Pasadena, CA
February 19, 1920		Redlands	W 23–17	12–2 (8–2)	Physical Education Building (400); Los Angeles, CA
*Non-conference game. ^{#}Rankings from AP Poll. (#) Tournament seedings in parentheses. All times are in Pacific Time.
