= UCLA Bruins men's basketball =

American college men's basketball team

2026–27 UCLA Bruins men's basketball team
- University: University of California, Los Angeles
- First season: 1919–20; 107 years ago
- Athletic director: Tim Harris
- Head coach: Mick Cronin; 8th season, 160–74 (.684)
- Location: Los Angeles, California
- Arena: Pauley Pavilion (capacity: 13,800)
- NCAA division: Division I
- Conference: Big Ten
- Nickname: Bruins
- Colors: Blue and gold
- Student section: The Den
- All-time record: 2,050–930 (.688)
- NCAA tournament record: 117–47 (.713)

NCAA Division I tournament champions
- 1964, 1965, 1967, 1968, 1969, 1970, 1971, 1972, 1973, 1975, 1995
Other NCAA Division I tournament results
Runner-up	1980*, 2006
Third place	1974, 1976
Final Four	1962, 1964, 1965, 1967, 1968, 1969, 1970, 1971, 1972, 1973, 1974, 1975, 1976, 1980*, 1995, 2006, 2007, 2008, 2021
Elite Eight	1950, 1962, 1964, 1965, 1967, 1968, 1969, 1970, 1971, 1972, 1973, 1974, 1975, 1976, 1979, 1980*, 1992, 1995, 1997, 2006, 2007, 2008, 2021
Sweet Sixteen	1952, 1956, 1962, 1963, 1964, 1965, 1967, 1968, 1969, 1970, 1971, 1972, 1973, 1974, 1975, 1976, 1977, 1978, 1979, 1980*, 1990, 1992, 1995, 1997, 1998, 2000, 2001, 2002, 2006, 2007, 2008, 2014, 2015, 2017, 2021, 2022, 2023
Appearances	1950, 1952, 1956, 1962, 1963, 1964, 1965, 1967, 1968, 1969, 1970, 1971, 1972, 1973, 1974, 1975, 1976, 1977, 1978, 1979, 1980*, 1981, 1983, 1987, 1989, 1990, 1991, 1992, 1993, 1994, 1995, 1996, 1997, 1998, 1999*, 2000, 2001, 2002, 2005, 2006, 2007, 2008, 2009, 2011, 2013, 2014, 2015, 2017, 2018, 2021, 2022, 2023, 2025, 2026

NIT champions
- 1985

Conference tournament champions
- Pac-12: 1987, 2006, 2008, 2014

Conference regular-season champions
- SCIAC: 1921, 1922, 1923, 1925, 1926, 1927 PCC: 1945, 1950, 1952, 1956 Pac-12: 1962, 1963, 1964, 1965, 1967, 1968, 1969, 1970, 1971, 1972, 1973, 1974, 1975, 1976, 1977, 1978, 1979, 1983, 1987, 1992, 1995, 1996, 1997, 2006, 2007, 2008, 2013, 2023

Conference division champions
- PCC South: 1945, 1947, 1949, 1950, 1951, 1952, 1955

Uniforms
Home	Away
- * vacated by NCAA

The UCLA Bruins men's basketball program represents the University of California, Los Angeles, in the sport of men's basketball as a member of the Big Ten Conference. Established in 1919, the program has won a record 11 NCAA titles. Coach John Wooden led the Bruins to 10 national titles in 12 seasons, from 1964 to 1975, including seven straight from 1967 to 1973. UCLA went undefeated a record four times (1964, 1967, 1972, and 1973). Coach Jim Harrick led the team to another NCAA title in 1995. Former coach Ben Howland led UCLA to three consecutive Final Four appearances from 2006 to 2008. As a member of the AAWU, Pacific-8 and then Pacific-10, UCLA set an NCAA Division I record with 13 consecutive regular season conference titles between 1967 and 1979 which stood until tied by Kansas in 2017. UCLA departed the Pac-12 Conference and joined the Big Ten Conference on August 2, 2024.

== NCAA records ==
UCLA men's basketball has set several NCAA records.

- 11 NCAA titles
- 7 consecutive NCAA titles (1967–1973)
- 13 NCAA title game appearances*
- 10 consecutive Final Four appearances (1967–1976)
- 25 Final Four wins*
- 38 game NCAA Tournament winning streak (1964–1974)
- 134 weeks ranked No. 1 in AP Top 25 Poll
- 54 consecutive winning seasons (1949–2002)
- 88 game men's regular season winning streak (1971–1974)
- 4 undefeated seasons (1964, 1967, 1972, 1973)
- 13 straight conference championships (tied with Kansas)

* 1980 tournament final vacated by NCAA

== History ==
=== Early years (1919–1948) ===
In 1919, Fred Cozens became the first head coach of the UCLA basketball and football teams. Cozens coached the basketball team for two seasons, finishing with an overall record of 21–4. Caddy Works was the head coach of the Bruins from 1921 to 1939, guiding them to a 173–159 record. Works was a lawyer by profession and coached the team only during the evenings. According to UCLA player and future Olympian Frank Lubin, Works was "more of an honorary coach" with little basketball knowledge. Dick Linthicum was UCLA's first All-American in any sport, earning selections in 1931 and 1932. Wilbur Johns was the UCLA basketball head coach from 1939 to 1948, guiding the Bruins to a 93–120 record.

=== John Wooden era (1948–1975) ===
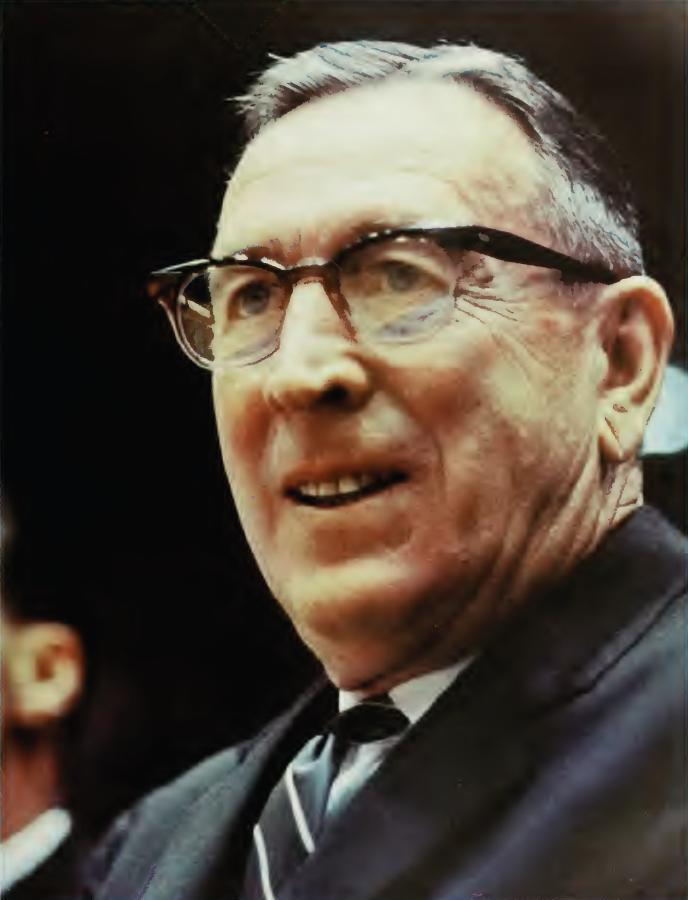
John Wooden coached UCLA to 10 national championships.

From 1948 to 1975, John Wooden, nicknamed the "Wizard of Westwood", served as UCLA's head coach. He won ten NCAA national championships in a 12-year period, including a run of seven in a row that shattered the previous record of only two consecutive titles; to this day, no other team has won more than two straight titles. Within this period, his teams won a men's basketball-record 88 consecutive games.

Prior to Wooden's arrival, UCLA had only won two conference championships in the previous 18 years. In his first season, Wooden guided a UCLA team that had finished with a 12–13 record the previous year to a 22–7 record—then the most wins in a season in program history—and the Pacific Coast Conference (PCC) Southern Division championship. In his second season, Wooden led the Bruins to a 24–7 record and the PCC championship. The Bruins would win the division title in each of the next two seasons and the conference title in the latter season. Up to that time, UCLA had won only two division titles since the PCC began divisional play, and it had not won a conference title of any kind since winning the Southern California Intercollegiate Athletic Conference in 1927.

In 1955–56, Wooden guided the Bruins to their first undefeated PCC conference title and a 17-game winning streak that only came to an end in the 1956 NCAA Tournament at the hands of a University of San Francisco team that featured Bill Russell. However, UCLA was unable to maintain this level of performance over the immediate ensuing seasons, finding itself unable to return to the NCAA Tournament as the Pete Newell-coached California teams took control of the conference at the end of the decade. Also hampering the fortunes of Wooden's team during that time period was a probation imposed on all UCLA sports in the aftermath of a scandal involving illegal payments made to players on the school's football team, along with USC, Cal and Stanford, resulting in the dismantling of the PCC conference.

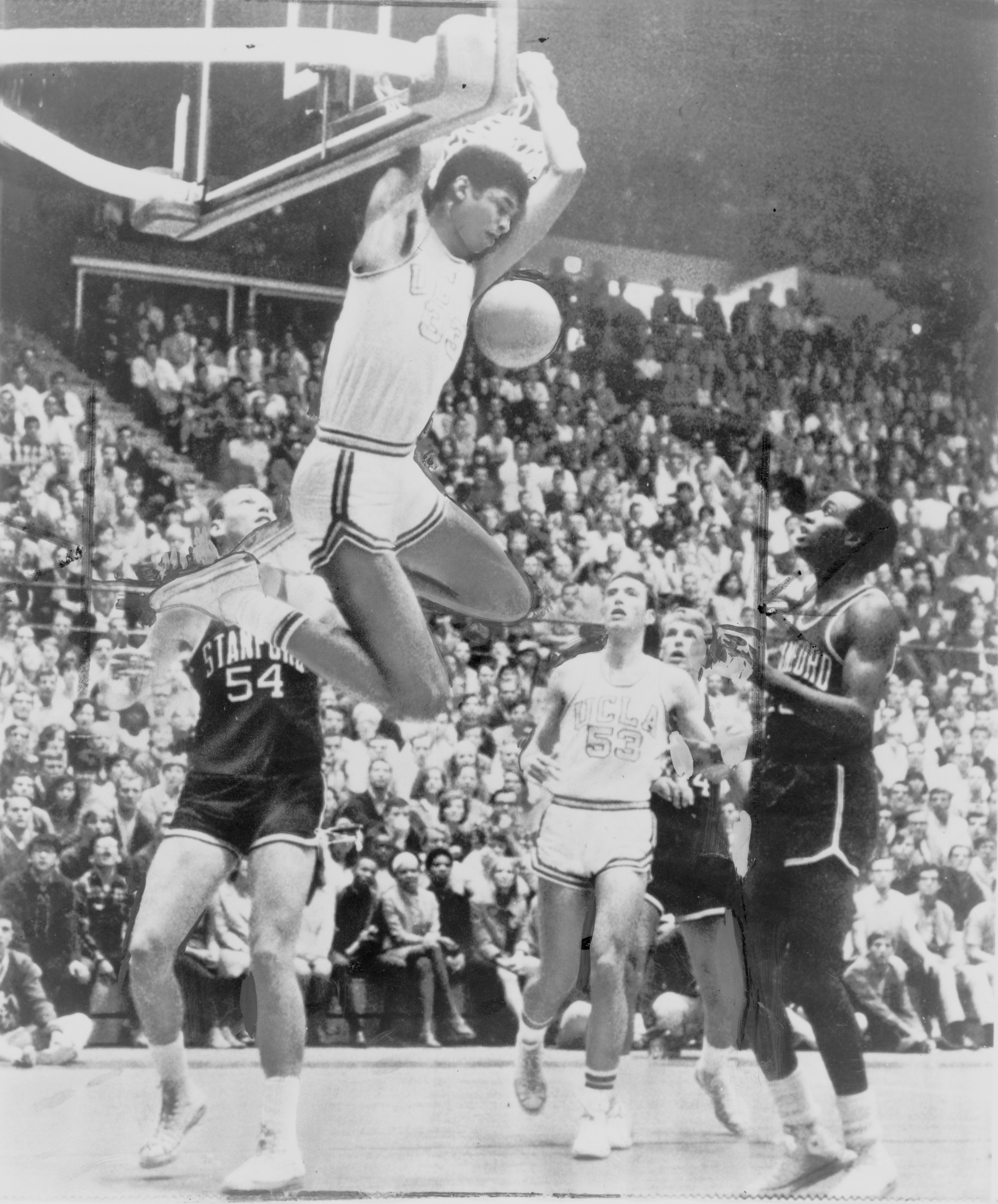
Lew Alcindor (later Kareem Abdul-Jabbar) makes a reverse two hand dunk.

By 1962 the probation was no longer in place and Wooden had returned the Bruins to the top of their conference (now the Pac-12 Conference). This time, however, they would take the next step, and go on to unleash a run of dominance unparalleled in the history of college sports. A narrow loss due largely to a controversial foul call in the semifinal of the 1962 NCAA Tournament convinced Wooden that his Bruins were ready to contend for national championships. Two seasons later, the final piece of the puzzle fell into place when assistant coach Jerry Norman persuaded Wooden that the team's small-sized players and fast-paced offense would be complemented by the adoption of a zone press defense. The result was a dramatic increase in scoring, giving UCLA a powerhouse team led by Walt Hazzard and Gail Goodrich that went undefeated on its way to the school's first basketball national championship.

Wooden's team repeated as national champions the following season before the squad fell briefly in 1966 when it finished second in the conference to Oregon State. UCLA was ineligible to play in the NCAA tournament that year because in those days only conference champions went to the tournament. However, the Bruins' incarnation returned with a vengeance in 1967 with the arrival of sophomore All-America and MVP Lew Alcindor. The team reclaimed not only the conference title but the national crown with an undefeated season.

In January 1968, UCLA took its 47-game winning streak to the Astrodome in Houston, where Alcindor, below par with an injured eye, squared off against Elvin Hayes in the Game of the Century, which was the nation's first nationally televised regular season college basketball game. Houston upset UCLA 71–69 behind Hayes' 39 points. In a post-game interview, Wooden stated, "We have to start over." They did, and went undefeated the rest of the year, avenging Houston 101–69 in the semi-final rematch of the NCAA tournament en route to the national championship. Hayes, who had been averaging 37.7 points per game, was held to only 10 points. Wooden credited Norman for devising the diamond-and-one defense that contained the Houston center.

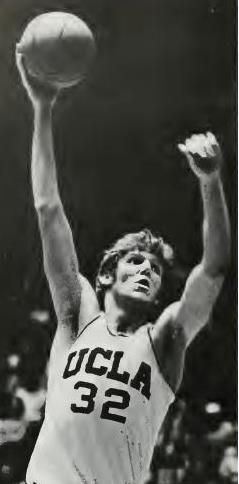
Bill Walton taking a shot

The emergence of the Bruins under Wooden vastly increased the program's popularity. Since 1932, the Bruins had played at the Men's Gym. It normally seated 2,400, but had been limited to 1,500 since 1955 by order of the city fire marshal. This forced games to be moved to Pan Pacific Auditorium, the Los Angeles Memorial Sports Arena and other venues around Los Angeles when larger crowds were expected—an increasing inconvenience since the Bruins' first national title. At Wooden's urging, a much larger on-campus facility was built in time for the 1965–66 season, the nearly 13,000 seat Pauley Pavilion.

Wooden coached his final game in Pauley Pavilion on March 1, 1975, when UCLA trounced Stanford 93–59. Four weeks later, following a 75–74 overtime victory over Louisville in the 1975 NCAA Tournament semifinal game, Wooden announced that he would retire at age 64 immediately after the championship game. His legendary coaching career concluded triumphantly, as his team responded with a win over Kentucky to claim Wooden's first career coaching victory over the Wildcats and his unprecedented 10th national championship in a twelve-year span.

During his tenure with the Bruins, Wooden became known as the "Wizard of Westwood", although he personally disdained the nickname. He gained lasting fame at UCLA by winning 620 games in 27 seasons and 10 NCAA titles during his last 12 seasons, which included seven in a row from 1967 to 1973. His UCLA teams also had a then-record winning streak of 88 games and four perfect 30–0 seasons. They also won 38 straight games in NCAA Tournaments and 98 straight home game wins at Pauley Pavilion. Wooden was named NCAA College Basketball's "Coach of the Year" in 1964, 1967, 1969, 1970, 1971, 1972 and 1973. In 1967, he was named the Henry Iba Award USBWA College Basketball Coach of the Year. In 1972, he shared Sports Illustrated magazine's "Sportsman of the Year" award with Billie Jean King. He was named to the Basketball Hall of Fame as a coach in 1973, becoming the first to be honored as both a player and a coach.

=== Association with Sam Gilbert ===
During Wooden's time at UCLA, and after his retirement in 1975, he faced criticism for the program's relationship with local businessman and booster Sam Gilbert, known by many of Wooden's players as "Papa Sam." Gilbert, a multi-millionaire contractor, was known for forging close financial relationships with UCLA players, supplying them with cars, clothes, stereos, travel, and apartments, as well as allegedly arranging abortions for players' girlfriends. He represented several UCLA stars, including Lew Alcindor and Bill Walton, as an agent after they turned pro.

A 1981 Los Angeles Times investigation, interviewing 45 people affiliated with the basketball program, revealed the extent of Gilbert's involvement, describing him as "a one-man clearinghouse who has enabled players and their families to receive goods and services usually at big discounts and sometimes free." The Times investigation found that Gilbert's involvement in the program began in 1967, when UCLA stars Alcindor and Lucius Allen were considering transferring to Michigan. They approached former UCLA star Willie Naulls, who introduced them to Gilbert. Gilbert met with the two players, and both remained at UCLA. Alcindor, later Kareem Abdul-Jabbar, said later that he would have stayed regardless but called Gilbert "like my surrogate father." Allen credited Gilbert with dissuading him from transferring: "There were two people I listened to. Coach Wooden as long as we were between the lines. Outside the court — Sam Gilbert." Allen said Gilbert paid for multiple abortions for players' girlfriends, including one of his own. "Everybody knew what was going on," UCLA player David Greenwood said. "Nobody was so naive. It was common knowledge in the whole town."

UCLA assistant Jerry Norman, who coached under Wooden from 1957 to 1968, recalled that Gilbert began "to come around our program right when I was ready to leave. What normally happens is, alumni come to you and say, 'Coach, is there any way I can help?' Well, maybe. A lot of kids want summer jobs. But Gilbert started going behind the coaches. Alcindor calls me one day in the spring. I ask him, 'Where are you?' and he says, 'I'm in Mr. Gilbert's office.'" In his autobiography Giant Steps, Abdul-Jabbar called Gilbert "that odd combination, a cagey humanitarian with a lot of muscle. Guys would go to him when they were in trouble, and he would find a way to fix it...Sam steered clear of John Wooden, and Mr. Wooden gave him the same wide berth. Both helped the school greatly...once the money thing got worked out, I never gave another thought to leaving UCLA."

"The way Sam explained it to me, it was within the rules," Allen said in a 2007 documentary. "But it wasn't." In 1973, freshman center Richard Washington told The New York Times the reason he'd chosen UCLA: "I took a dip in Sam Gilbert's pool and it cooled me off and that was the convincer."

In 1978, NCAA field investigator J. Brent Clark testified before a Congressional subcommittee that he had begun investigating Gilbert's activities the year before but was told to back off by a superior at the NCAA, Bill Hunt. "If I had spent a month in Los Angeles, I could have put them [UCLA] on indefinite suspension," Clark said later, but "as long as Wooden was there, the NCAA would never have taken any action." Clark told Congress: "The conclusion I draw is that it is an example of a school that is too big, too powerful, and too well respected by the public, that the timing was not right to proceed against them.

Wooden was aware of Gilbert's closeness with his players. In 1972, Wooden said "I personally hardly know Sam Gilbert...I think he's a person who's trying to be helpful in every way that he can. I sometimes feel that in his interest to be helpful it's in direct contrast with what I would like to have him do to be helpful. I think he means very well and, for the most part, he has attached himself to the minority-race players. I really don't want to get involved in saying much about that, to be honest with you."

Despite concerns about Gilbert, Wooden said he chose not to ask players to cut off contact, telling the Times in 1981: "There's as much crookedness as you want to find. There was something Abraham Lincoln said — he'd rather trust and be disappointed than distrust and be miserable all the time. Maybe I trusted too much." The Times reporters, Mike Littwin and Alan Greenberg, concluded: "Wooden knew about Gilbert. He knew the players were close to Gilbert. He knew they looked to Gilbert for advice. Maybe he knew more. He should have known much more. If he didn't, it was only because he apparently chose not to look."

Wooden did pass along his concerns to UCLA athletic director J. D. Morgan, but Morgan did not pursue the matter aggressively, in part because he believed Gilbert was connected to the Mafia. Former UCLA chancellor Charles E. Young recalled Morgan "saying to me in that deep voice of his, 'Chuck, you don't know about Sam Gilbert. Do you want to end up on a block of concrete at the bottom of the ocean?' J. D.'s view of him was that if you cross Sam, you're likely to be killed, literally."

Gene Bartow, who succeeded Wooden as UCLA coach, felt similarly. In 1991, he wrote a letter to an NCAA official thanking him for suppressing Brent Clark's investigation into Gilbert. "I want to say 'thank you' for possibly saving my life...I believe Sam Gilbert was Mafia-related and was capable of hurting people. I think, had the NCAA come in hard while I was at UCLA, Gilbert and others associated with the program would have felt I had reported them, and I would have been in possible danger...Without question, he put out some front-end money to recruits in a few cases, and I think that could have been proven."

In 1981, after Wooden's retirement, an NCAA investigation sanctioned UCLA for its relationship with Gilbert, putting the program on probation for two seasons and ordering the school to disassociate itself from him. Three players at other universities told NCAA investigators that Gilbert had offered them cars to commit to UCLA.

In 1987, Gilbert was indicted in Florida for conspiracy, racketeering, and money laundering as part of a drug smuggling scheme, but he died of heart failure before he could be prosecuted. His son, Michael Gilbert, was convicted on four counts in the case. Trial testimony revealed that Sam Gilbert had used Miami drug money to build The Bicycle Hotel & Casino in Bell Gardens, California.

=== Post-Wooden era (1975–1988) ===
From 1975 to 1977, Gene Bartow served as the head coach of UCLA. He guided them to a 52–9 record, including a berth in the 1976 Final Four. He coached the 1977 College Player of the Year, Marques Johnson.

Gary Cunningham became the head coach at UCLA in 1977. He coached two seasons, winning the Pacific-8 and Pacific-10 conference championships and leading UCLA to a #2 ranking in the final polls both seasons.

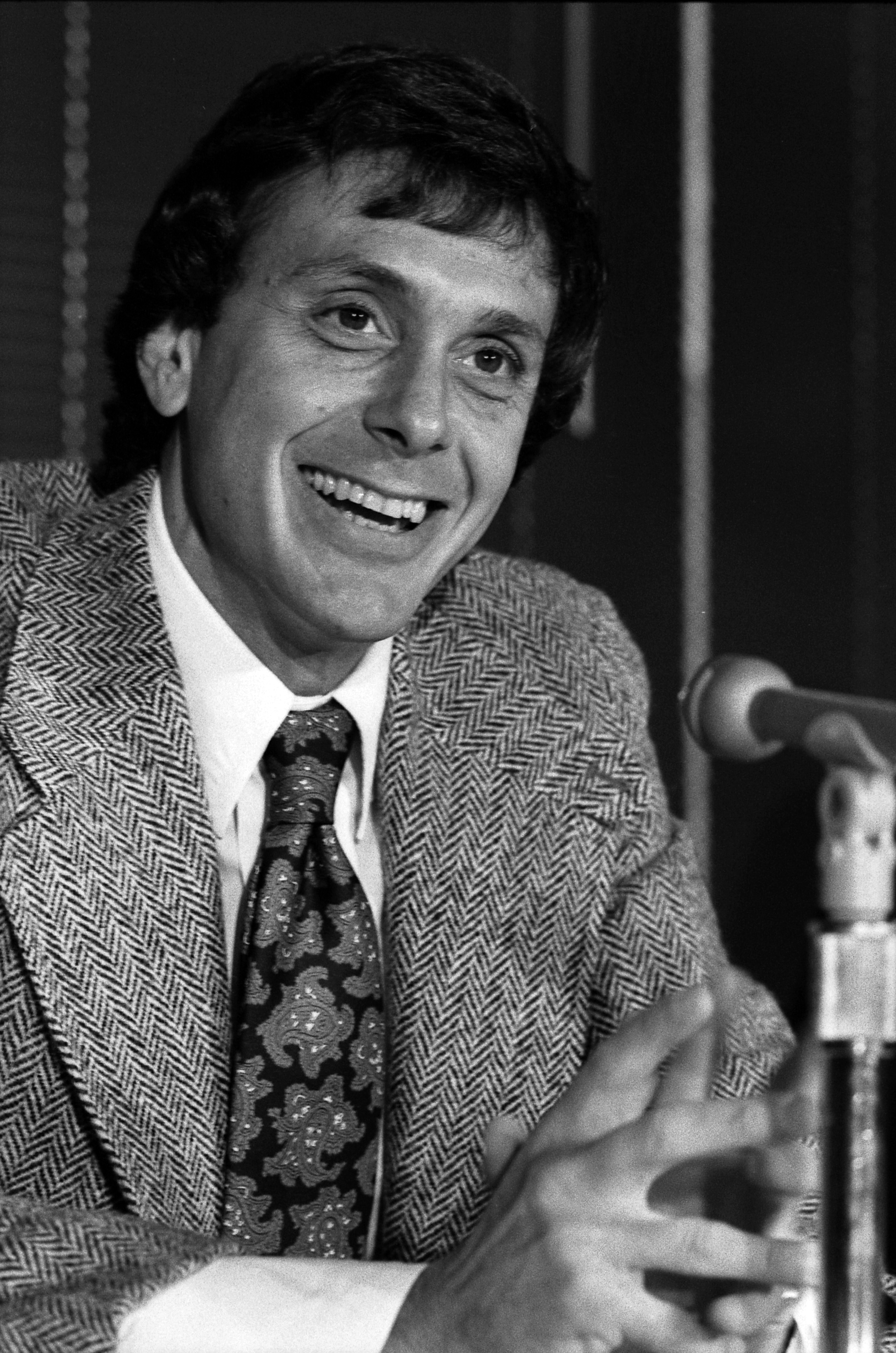
Larry Brown being announced as UCLA coach, 1979

Larry Brown then moved on to coach UCLA from 1979 to 1981, leading his freshman-dominated 1979–80 team to the NCAA title game before falling to Louisville, 59–54. However, that runner-up finish was later vacated by the NCAA after two players were found to be ineligible. This was one of the few times a Final Four squad had its record vacated (Villanova had its runner-up finish vacated in 1971 because Howard Porter had signed a pro contract).

Larry Farmer was the head coach of UCLA from 1981 to 1984, guiding them to a 61–23 (.726) record. He had recruited Earvin "Magic" Johnson to come play at UCLA, but then told Johnson (was drafted into the NBA in 1979) to hold off on a visit as he was more interested in Albert King. Farmer signed neither King nor Johnson, and neither recruit played for UCLA.

In 1984, Walt Hazzard was named the UCLA basketball coach 20 years after he was an All-America when UCLA won its first national championship. He coached for four seasons, winning 77 out of 125 games. The 1984–1985 UCLA Bruin basketball team won the NIT championship. The 1986–1987 UCLA Bruin basketball team won both the Pac-10 regular season championship as well as the inaugural Pacific-10 Conference men's basketball tournament.

=== Jim Harrick era (1988–1996) ===
In 1988, Jim Harrick returned to UCLA (he had spent two years as an assistant coach from 1978 to 1979) to assume head coaching duties after the firing of Walt Hazzard. During the recruiting period before his first season, he recruited Don MacLean, the most significant recruit to commit to UCLA in several years. McLean's arrival helped start a revival of the basketball program. Within four years, the Bruins were in the Elite Eight--"officially" their deepest advance in the tournament in 13 years, and only the second time they had gone that far since Wooden's departure.

During the 1994–1995 season, he led UCLA to a 32–1 record (a loss to California was subsequently forfeited to the Bruins) and the school's eleventh national championship, its first since the 1974–75 season. The 31 actual wins would stand as a school record until the 2005–06 season. In 1996, Harrick's Bruins were upset in the first round by Princeton. Shortly before the 1997 season, UCLA fired Harrick for lying about who attended a recruiting dinner. At the time, Harrick was the second-winningest coach in school history and the only coach to achieve a National Championship at UCLA post John Wooden to date.

=== Steve Lavin era (1996–2003) ===
After the sacking of Harrick and with the departure of assistants Mark Gottfried and Lorenzo Romar for head coaching jobs shortly after the 1995 NCAA Championship season, Steve Lavin, as the assistant with the longest tenure at UCLA, was selected as interim head coach.

Later that season on February 11, 1997, with the Bruins tied for first place in the Pac-10 with an 8–3 record, UCLA removed the "interim" tag from Lavin's title and formally named him as its 11th head coach. The Bruins then won their next 11 games en route to the Pac-10 title, before being eliminated by the Minnesota Gophers in the NCAA Midwest Regional Final. In seven seasons as head coach Lavin's record was 12–4 in games involving overtime. Additionally Lavin's Bruins had a 10–4 record against the rival USC Trojans. During the period 1997–2002, Lavin's Bruins compiled nine consecutive overtime victories. These included victories over Arizona, Cincinnati (2002 NCAA second round double overtime victory over No. 1 West Region seed), Kentucky, and Stanford (then ranked No 1). The Stanford win was sealed by a last second jumper by star sophomore guard JaRon Rush.

At UCLA from 1996 to 2003, Lavin compiled a record of 145–78. As both an assistant and head coach, Lavin participated in 13 consecutive NCAA tournament appearances (1990–2002), while working at Purdue and UCLA. During Lavin's tenure as a head coach, he was one of only two coaches in the country to lead his team to five NCAA "Sweet 16s" in six years (1997, 1998, 2000–2002), the other coach being Duke's Mike Krzyzewski. Lavin guided UCLA to six consecutive seasons of 20 or more wins, as well as six consecutive NCAA tournament appearances.

Lavin signed seven McDonald's High School All-Americans. Seven of Lavin's former Bruin recruits became roster members of NBA teams: Trevor Ariza, Matt Barnes, Baron Davis, Dan Gadzuric, Ryan Hollins, Jason Kapono, and Earl Watson.

During Lavin's tenure as head coach, the Bruins qualified for six consecutive NCAA Tournaments (1997–2002). Lavin's record in the first and second rounds of the NCAA tournament is 10–1. His winning percentage (90.9%) in the first two rounds is second only to Dean Smith in NCAA Tournament history. However, Lavin also coached the Bruins to their only loss in an NCAA tournament game played in the State of California (a 2002 loss to Missouri in San Jose).

In seven seasons as head coach Lavin's record was 12–4 in games involving overtime. The Bruins defeated the No. 1 team in the country in four consecutive collegiate seasons: Stanford in 2000 and 2001, Kansas in 2002 and Arizona in 2003.

In March 2003, following UCLA's first losing season (10–19) in 55 years, Lavin was fired.

Despite some success under the watch of Steve Lavin, the program wanted to regain its position in the college basketball upper echelon. Even the success in the NCAA tournament belied the fact that UCLA had earned no better than a number 4 seed with the exception of the 1997 season. The 2002–03 season turned out to be the back-breaker for Lavin as the Bruins stumbled to a 10–19 record and a 6–12 record in the conference. It was the first losing season for UCLA in over five decades. Lavin was dismissed following the season.

=== Ben Howland era (2003–2013) ===
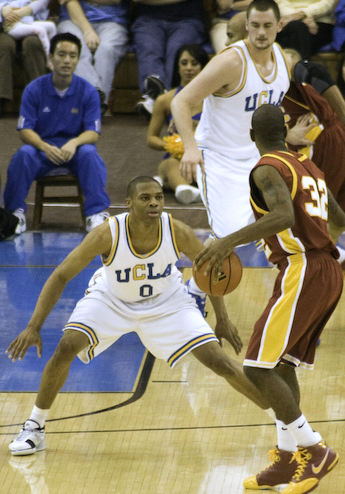
Russell Westbrook (left) and Kevin Love defend against USC

UCLA looked to find a coach that could move the Bruins back to the elite ranks of the Pac-10 and the country. Ben Howland's success at the University of Pittsburgh and his southern California roots made him an attractive candidate. In 2003, he left Pitt and accepted the head coaching duties at UCLA.

Howland remedied this disappointment in his recruiting efforts. Howland produced a top tier recruiting class from athletes in southern California that fit his Big East style. Behind Lavin hold-over Dijon Thompson and Howland recruits Jordan Farmar and Arron Afflalo, UCLA produced a winning season for the first time in three years and returned to the tournament, where they lost in the first round.

Starting the 2005–06 season with the majority of the roster made over in Howland's image and with the Lavin hold-overs (e.g., Ryan Hollins and Cedric Bozeman), the Bruins produced an excellent campaign. They finished the regular season 24–6, winning the Pac-10 Conference title. They then roared through the Pac-10 tournament, winning each game by double digits en route to only the second Pac-10 tournament championship in school history. The momentum continued into the NCAA tournament as the second-seeded Bruins defeated Gonzaga in the Sweet Sixteen. They then upset top-seeded Memphis to reach the school's first Final Four in 11 years. The run ended in the championship game against Florida, whose imposing front-line proved to be a matchup problem for the Bruins.

Howland continued his success at UCLA the following year. The Bruins finished undefeated at home for the first time in 22 years, winning the Pac-10 conference title. However they lost in their first Pac-10 tournament game and were seeded second in the NCAA Tournament West Region. After a close second-round win over Indiana, Howland led the Bruins to a win over his former team, Pitt in the Sweet Sixteen. The Bruins then again upset the top seed in the West Region, Kansas, and reached the second of UCLA's first consecutive Final Fours since the John Wooden era, only to lose again to Florida in the national semifinal.

At the start of the 2007–08 season, expectations for UCLA were the highest ever with the arrival of Kevin Love, one of the best low-post prospects in the high school class of 2007. Combined with the emergence of Russell Westbrook and Darren Collison in the back-court, the Bruins won their 3rd consecutive Pac-10 conference title, and their second Pac-10 tournament title in three years. They received their first No. 1 seed in the NCAA tournament since 1995, and once again reached the Final Four, where they faced another top seed, the Memphis Tigers. Memphis got the better of the Bruins, who returned to Westwood without a championship once again.

However, the Bruins program under Howland began to struggle in subsequent seasons. After 2008, UCLA did not advance past the first weekend of the NCAA tourney, and did not qualify for the tournament in 2010 and 2012. With a 77–73 victory over Penn on December 10, 2011; Howland passed Jim Harrick for second on UCLA's all-time wins list behind John Wooden. Nonetheless, questions about how Howland was running the program began to come into focus. In February 2012, a Sports Illustrated article portrayed UCLA player Reeves Nelson as a bully on and off the court, who at times intentionally tried to injure his teammates. According to the article, Howland looked the other way and did not discipline Nelson for over two years. From 2008—the Bruins' last Final Four appearance—through 2012, at least 11 players left the UCLA program.

Although the 2012–2013 Bruins won the Pac-12 regular season championship, they quickly bowed out in the first round of the NCAA tournament. On March 25, 2013, three days after being eliminated by 11th seed Minnesota, UCLA fired Howland.

=== Steve Alford era (2013–2019) ===
On March 30, 2013, Steve Alford signed a seven-year, $18.2-million contract to become the head coach of UCLA, replacing the fired Ben Howland. In his first year as head coach Alford led UCLA to a Pac-12 tournament championship, a feat not accomplished since 2008. The team later went on to the Sweet Sixteen of the NCAA Division I men's basketball tournament as a 4 seed in the South regional before losing to the 1 seed Florida.

In his second year, the team was controversially chosen to participate in the 2015 NCAA Division I men's basketball tournament as an 11 seed in the South Region, where they upset the 6 seed SMU on a game-winning goaltending call. The Bruins went on to defeat the University of Alabama at Birmingham Blazers before losing to Gonzaga in the Sweet Sixteen.

After a disappointing third season in which UCLA suffered their fourth losing record since 1948, the team rebounded in the following season, going 31–5 before falling to Kentucky, again in the Sweet Sixteen, considered an underachievement given the talent level and overall record of the team. Freshman point guard Lonzo Ball, as well as the program in general, garnered national media attention for the outspoken behavior of his father LaVar Ball.

Prior to the beginning of the 2017–18 season, the team travelled to China to participate in the annual Pac-12 China Game. On November 6 in Hangzhou, during a block of free time allotted to the players, freshmen LiAngelo Ball, Cody Riley and Jalen Hill shoplifted sunglasses from a Louis Vuitton department store. They were placed under house arrest by local police the next day and required to hand over their passports. The controversy garnered immense attention due to the reputation of LiAngelo as a member of the Ball family and received significant media coverage. President Donald Trump, who was concurrently visiting China, reportedly asked General Secretary Xi Jinping to pardon the three men, and they were released back to the United States shortly after, although Ball's family questioned if the President's request was a direct reason for the release. Xi himself later reportedly denied that Trump had asked him about pardoning the UCLA players and that the General Secretary had nothing to do with their release. The players were placed on suspension from basketball activities, and were eventually suspended for the entirety of the season on December 22. LaVar Ball maintained that his son had not deserved suspension; LiAngelo Ball withdrew from UCLA and signed with a sports agent, making him ineligible for further NCAA competition.

UCLA finished the regular season in a three-way tie for third (tied with Utah and Stanford) in the Pac-12 (21–10, 11–7), disappointingly falling to St. Bonaventure in the NCAA First Four Play-in Round. Junior guard Aaron Holiday was named to the First-team All-Pac-12 and the Pac-12 All Defensive Team, the first player to do so in the Alford era. Holiday was drafted 23 by the Indiana Pacers in the First Round of the 2018 NBA Draft.

UCLA started the 2018–19 season ranked No. 21 in the AP Poll and won seven of its first nine games. However, they concluded non-conference play with four consecutive losses, including back-to-back home losses to mid-major teams Belmont and Liberty. The 73–58 loss to Liberty on December 29 was UCLA's most lopsided home loss in Alford's tenure. Two days after that loss, UCLA announced that Alford had been fired and that assistant coach Murry Bartow would serve as interim head coach for the remainder of the season. They failed to qualify for the NCAA Tournament, and ended the decade without a Final Four appearance for the first time since the 1950s.

=== Mick Cronin era (2019–present) ===
On April 9, 2019, UCLA announced the hiring of Mick Cronin as the program's 14th head coach. He was named Pac-12 Coach of the Year in his first season in 2019–20. However, due to the COVID-19 pandemic, the Pac-12 Tournament and NCAA Tournament were cancelled. The following season in 2020–21, the Bruins opened the NCAA Tournament in the First Four, advancing to the Final Four after defeating No. 1 seed Michigan. No. 11 seed UCLA became the second First Four team to reach the Final Four, the school's first national semifinal since 2008, which had also been their last trip to the Elite Eight. In 2022–23, the Bruins received a No. 2 seed in the 2023 NCAA tournament, their highest seeding since they were placed No. 1 in 2008. They advanced to the Sweet Sixteen for the third straight season, but losing two starters due to injuries, they were eliminated from the tournament for the second time in three years by Gonzaga.

== Postseason results ==
=== Complete NCAA tournament results ===
The Bruins have appeared in the NCAA tournament 52 times. Their combined record is 116–46.

Year	Seed	Round	Opponent	Result
1950		First Round; Regional 3rd Place	Bradley; BYU	L 59–73; L 62–83
1952		First Round; Regional 3rd Place	Santa Clara; Oklahoma City	L 59–68; L 53–55
1956		Sweet Sixteen; Regional 3rd Place	San Francisco; Seattle	L 61–72; W 94–70
1962		Sweet Sixteen; Elite Eight; Final Four; National 3rd Place	Utah State; Oregon State; Cincinnati; Wake Forest	W 73–62; W 88–69; L 70–72; L 80–82
1963		Sweet Sixteen; Regional 3rd Place Game	Arizona State; San Francisco	L 79–93; L 75–76
1964		Sweet Sixteen; Elite Eight; Final Four; National Championship	Seattle; San Francisco; Kansas State; Duke	W 95–90; W 76–72; W 90–84; W 98–83
1965		Sweet Sixteen; Elite Eight; Final Four; National Championship	BYU; San Francisco; Wichita State; Michigan	W 100–76; W 101–93; W 108–89; W 91–80
1967		Sweet Sixteen; Elite Eight; Final Four; National Championship	Wyoming; Pacific; Houston; Dayton	W 109–60; W 80–64; W 73–58; W 79–64
1968		Sweet Sixteen; Elite Eight; Final Four; National Championship	New Mexico State; Santa Clara; Houston; North Carolina	W 58–49; W 87–66; W 101–69; W 78–55
1969		Sweet Sixteen; Elite Eight; Final Four; National Championship	New Mexico State; Santa Clara; Drake; Purdue	W 53–38; W 90–52; W 85–82; W 92–72
1970		Sweet Sixteen; Elite Eight; Final Four; National Championship	Long Beach State; Utah State; New Mexico State; Jacksonville	W 88–65; W 101–79; W 93–77; W 80–69
1971		Sweet Sixteen; Elite Eight; Final Four; National Championship	BYU; Long Beach State; Kansas; Villanova	W 91–73; W 57–55; W 68–60; W 68–62
1972		Sweet Sixteen; Elite Eight; Final Four; National Championship	Weber State; Long Beach State; Louisville; Florida State	W 90–58; W 73–57; W 96–77; W 81–76
1973		Sweet Sixteen; Elite Eight; Final Four; National Championship	Arizona State; San Francisco; Indiana; Memphis State	W 98–81; W 54–39; W 70–59; W 87–66
1974		Sweet Sixteen; Elite Eight; Final Four; National 3rd Place	Dayton; San Francisco; NC State; Kansas	W 111–100^{3OT} W 83–60; L 77–80^{2OT} W 78–61
1975		First Round; Sweet Sixteen; Elite Eight; Final Four; National Championship	Michigan; Montana; Arizona State; Louisville; Kentucky	W 103–91^{OT} W 67–64; W 89–75; W 75–74^{OT} W 92–85
1976		First Round; Sweet Sixteen; Elite Eight; Final Four; National 3rd Place	San Diego State; Pepperdine; Arizona; Indiana; Rutgers	W 74–64; W 70–61; W 82–66; L 51–65; W 106–92
1977		First Round; Sweet Sixteen	Louisville; Idaho State	W 87–79; L 75–76
1978		First Round; Sweet Sixteen	Kansas; Arkansas	W 83–76; L 70–74
1979	#1	Quarterfinals; Sweet Sixteen; Elite Eight	#9 Pepperdine #4 San Francisco #2 DePaul	W 76–71; W 99–81; L 91–95
1980*	#8	First Round; Quarterfinals; Sweet Sixteen; Elite Eight; Final Four; National Championship	#9 Old Dominion #1 DePaul #4 Ohio State #6 Clemson #6 Purdue #2 Louisville	W 87–74; W 77–71; W 72–68; W 85–74; W 67–62; L 54–59
1981	#3	Quarterfinals	#6 BYU	L 55–78
1983	#2	Quarterfinals	#10 Utah	L 61–67
1987	#4	First Round; Second Round	#13 Central Michigan #12 Wyoming	W 92–73; L 68–78
1989	#7	First Round; Second Round	#10 Iowa State #2 North Carolina	W 84–74; L 81–88
1990	#7	First Round; Second Round; Sweet Sixteen	#10 UAB #2 Kansas #3 Duke	W 68–56; W 71–70; L 81–90
1991	#4	First Round	#13 Penn State	L 69–74
1992	#1	First Round; Second Round; Sweet Sixteen; Elite Eight	#16 Robert Morris #8 Louisville #12 New Mexico State #2 Indiana	W 73–53; W 85–69; W 85–78; L 81–90
1993	#9	First Round; Second Round	#8 Iowa State #1 Michigan	W 81–70; L 84–86^{OT}
1994	#5	First Round	#12 Tulsa	L 102–112
1995	#1	First Round; Second Round; Sweet Sixteen; Elite Eight; Final Four; National Championship	#16 FIU #8 Missouri #5 Mississippi State #2 Connecticut #4 Oklahoma State #2 Arkansas	W 92–56; W 75–74; W 86–67; W 102–96; W 74–61; W 89–78
1996	#4	First Round	#13 Princeton	L 41–43
1997	#2	First Round; Second Round; Sweet Sixteen; Elite Eight	#15 Charleston Southern #7 Xavier #6 Iowa State #1 Minnesota	W 109–75; W 96–83; W 74–73^{OT} L 72–80
1998	#6	First Round; Second Round; Sweet Sixteen	#11 Miami (FL) #3 Michigan #2 Kentucky	W 65–62; W 85–82; L 68–94
1999*	#5	First Round	#12 Detroit	L 53–56
2000	#6	First Round; Second Round; Sweet Sixteen	#11 Ball State #3 Maryland #2 Iowa State	W 65–57; W 105–70; L 56–80
2001	#4	First Round; Second Round; Sweet Sixteen	#13 Hofstra #12 Utah State #1 Duke	W 61–48; W 75–50; L 63–76
2002	#8	First Round; Second Round; Sweet Sixteen	#9 Ole Miss #1 Cincinnati #12 Missouri	W 80–58; W 105–101^{2OT} L 73–82
2005	#11	First Round	#6 Texas Tech	L 66–78
2006	#2	First Round; Second Round; Sweet Sixteen; Elite Eight; Final Four; National Championship	#15 Belmont #10 Alabama #3 Gonzaga #1 Memphis #4 LSU #3 Florida	W 78–44; W 62–59; W 73–71; W 50–45; W 59–45; L 57–73
2007	#2	First Round; Second Round; Sweet Sixteen; Elite Eight; Final Four	#15 Weber State #7 Indiana #3 Pittsburgh #1 Kansas #1 Florida	W 70–42; W 54–49; W 64–55; W 68–55; L 66–76
2008	#1	First Round; Second Round; Sweet Sixteen; Elite Eight; Final Four	#16 Mississippi Valley State #9 Texas A&M #12 Western Kentucky #3 Xavier #1 Memphis	W 70–29; W 51–49; W 88–78; W 76–57; L 63–78
2009	#6	First Round; Second Round	#11 VCU #3 Villanova	W 65–64; L 69–89
2011	#7	First Round; Second Round	#10 Michigan State #2 Florida	W 78–76; L 65–73
2013	#6	First Round	#11 Minnesota	L 63–83
2014	#4	First Round; Second Round; Sweet Sixteen	#13 Tulsa #12 Stephen F. Austin #1 Florida	W 76–59; W 77–60; L 68–79
2015	#11	First Round; Second Round; Sweet Sixteen	#6 SMU #14 UAB #2 Gonzaga	W 60–59; W 92–75; L 62–74
2017	#3	First Round; Second Round; Sweet Sixteen	#14 Kent State #6 Cincinnati #2 Kentucky	W 97–80; W 79–67; L 75–86
2018	#11	First Four	#11 St. Bonaventure	L 58–65
2021	#11	First Four; First Round; Second Round; Sweet Sixteen; Elite Eight; Final Four	#11 Michigan State #6 BYU #14 Abilene Christian #2 Alabama #1 Michigan #1 Gonzaga	W 86–80^{OT} W 73–62; W 67–47; W 88–78^{OT} W 51–49; L 90–93^{OT}
2022	#4	First Round; Second Round; Sweet Sixteen	#13 Akron #5 Saint Mary's #8 North Carolina	W 57–53; W 72–56; L 66–73
2023	#2	First Round; Second Round; Sweet Sixteen	#15 UNC Asheville #7 Northwestern #3 Gonzaga	W 86–53; W 68–63; L 76–79
2025	#7	First Round; Second Round	#10 Utah State #2 Tennessee	W 72–47; L 58–67
2026	#7	First Round; Second Round	#10 UCF #2 UConn	W 75–71; L 57–73

*UCLA's appearances in the 1980 and 1999 tournaments were both vacated by the NCAA. Their record in the tournament excluding those two appearances is 110–43.

=== NIT results ===
The Bruins have appeared in the National Invitation Tournament (NIT) two times. Their combined record is 5–1.

Year	Round	Opponent	Result
1985	First Round; Second Round; Quarterfinals; Semifinals; Finals	Montana; Nebraska; Fresno State; Louisville; Indiana	W 78–47; W 82–63; W 53–43; W 75–66; W 65–62
1986	First Round	UC Irvine	L 74–80

== Facilities ==
The men's basketball team played in the 2,400 seat Men's Gym from 1932 to 1965. They also played at other venues around Los Angeles, including the Pan-Pacific Auditorium and Los Angeles Memorial Sports Arena, when larger crowds were expected for games.

=== Pauley Pavilion ===
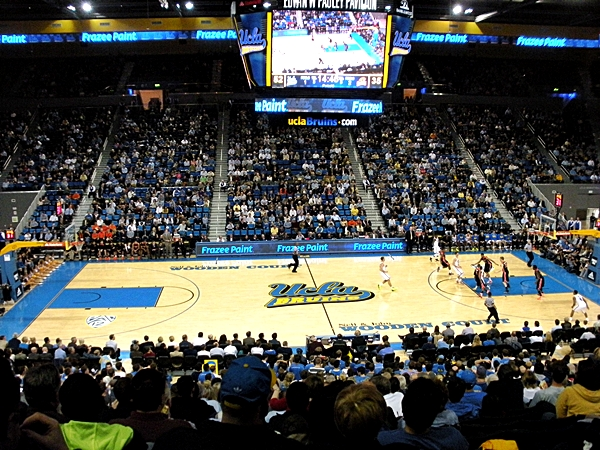
UCLA Bruins vs. Oregon State Beavers, January 2013, in the "New Pauley Pavilion"

Following UCLA's second championship in 1965, the idea of constructing a new arena to accommodate increased interest in the team was proposed. In 1965, Pauley Pavilion, named for oil magnate Ed Pauley, was built on campus and has been the home of the Bruins basketball programs since that time. During the 2011–12 season, Pauley Pavilion underwent a complete, $136 million renovation, both inside and out, earning it the nickname of "New Pauley." A new attendance record was set on March 2, 2013, when 13,727 fans watched the Bruins defeating the Arizona Wildcats 74–69.

=== Mo Ostin Basketball Center ===
The Mo Ostin Basketball Center south of the Los Angeles Tennis Center and close to Pauley Pavilion, the basketball team's home court was completed in 2017 to serve as a practice facility and hub for the basketball team. Ostin was a record producer and a UCLA alumnus. On December 14, 2015, Russell Westbrook had donated a "significant" sum to the construction of the center, for which the facility's court was named in his honor. Westbrook's former teammate, Kevin Love, matched his contribution on September 20, 2016, for which the strength and conditioning center was named after him.

== Coaches ==
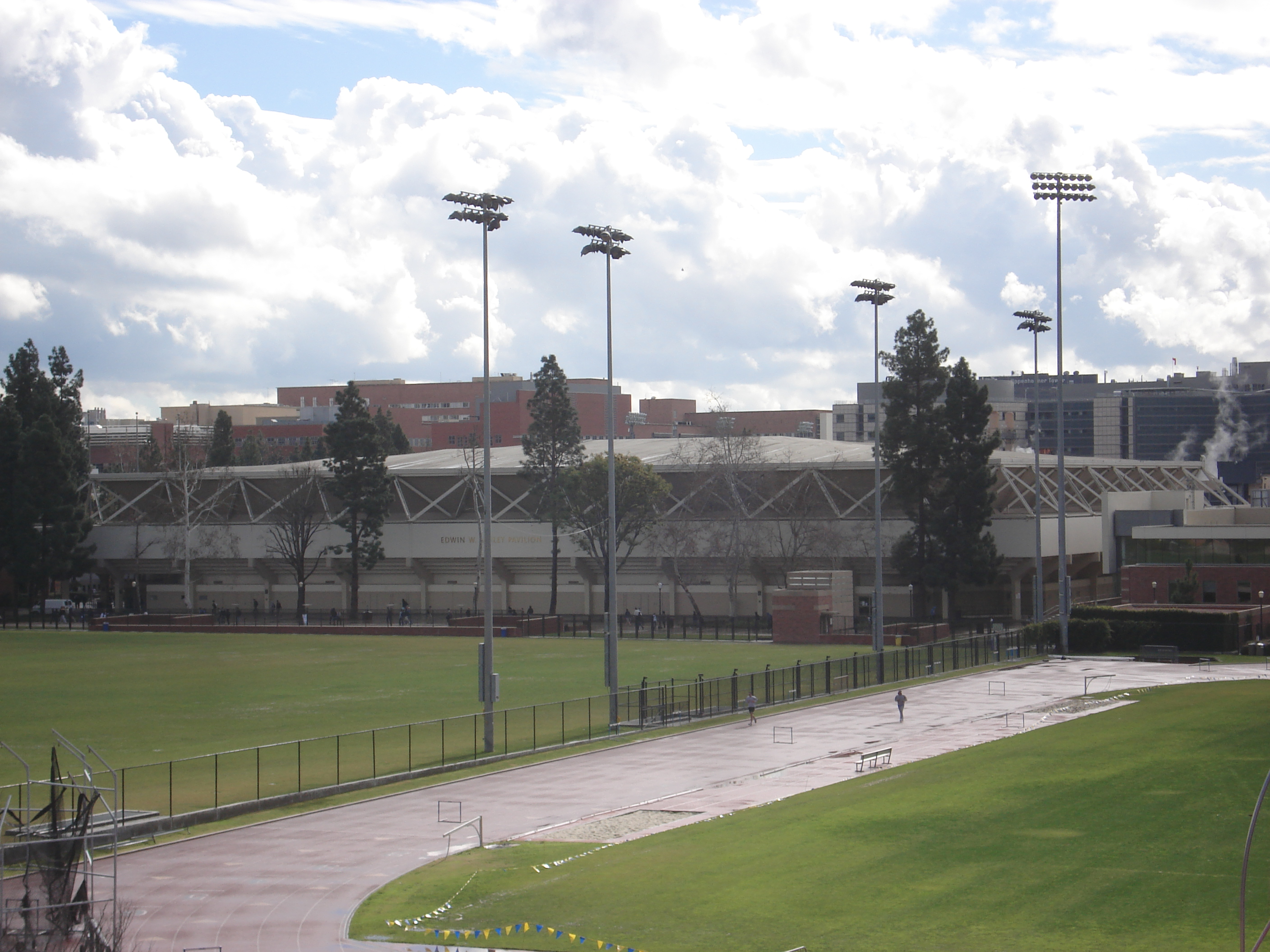
Pauley Pavilion, home court of the Bruins, prior to the 2012 renovation

The team has had 12 head coaches in its history, and they have won 11 NCAA Championships, the most of any school. John Wooden won 10 national championships between 1964 and 1975, and Jim Harrick won the other in 1995. The New York Times wrote that Wooden "made UCLA the most successful team in college basketball." After Wooden retired, the four coaches that succeeded him resigned, and the following three—Harrick included—were fired. The average tenure of those coaches after Wooden was four years. (Note: There were 28 seasons from 1975–76 to 2002–03 and 7 coaches, an average of 4 years. The Yahoo article said 3.9.) Former coach Ben Howland led the Bruins to three consecutive Final Four appearances from 2006 to 2008. As of 2025, the head coach of UCLA basketball is Mick Cronin. Since being hired in 2019, Cronin's teams consistently deliver tough defensive performances, but have thus far have struggled with generating consistent offenses and sustained runs in the NCAA Tournament. In his first 3 seasons, Cronin reached the Final Four once and the Sweet Sixteen twice, but in his last two seasons he has failed to lead his team beyond round 32.

== Rivalries ==
=== USC ===
When John Wooden became the coach, UCLA turned into a national basketball powerhouse. UCLA has won 11 NCAA Division I men's basketball tournaments and has dominated the conference, winning two games for every one that USC won. As of the 2013–2014 season, UCLA has won or shared the conference title 31 times, and USC has won or shared the title 7 times. There have been a number of significant games in this rivalry.

=== Arizona ===
Since the mid-1980s, UCLA has also had a basketball rivalry with Arizona under coach Lute Olson, as the two schools competed for the Pac-10 Championship every year. Since 1985 the two teams have combined to win 27 out of the 38 conference titles. The UCLA–Arizona basketball rivalry still is seen as the match up of the two premier teams in the conference. Also, the performance of the two schools influences the national opinion of the conference.

=== Notre Dame ===
UCLA had a basketball rivalry with Notre Dame that started when Digger Phelps was the Notre Dame coach and John Wooden was the UCLA coach. UCLA and Notre Dame played a home-and-home meeting for several seasons, which is otherwise uncommon outside conference play. This rivalry existed from the desire of the Notre Dame athletic department to schedule the top schools for intersectional competition. UCLA and Notre Dame played 42 times between 1966 and 1995, and the height of the rivalry was when Notre Dame ended UCLA's consecutive-game winning streak at 88 on January 19, 1974. UCLA also broke a 60-game Notre Dame winning streak in South Bend. Previous UCLA head coach Ben Howland scheduled Notre Dame four times: in 2004, 2005, 2008, and 2009. After Notre Dame's victory on December 14, 2019, UCLA leads the all-time series 29–21.

== By the numbers ==
- National titles – 11
- Final Four – 19*
- Elite Eights – 23*
- Sweet Sixteens – 35*
- Conference titles – 31
- Conference tournament titles – 4
- Undefeated conference seasons – 11
- Undefeated seasons – 4
- 20-win seasons – 72
- 30-win seasons – 69
- Winning seasons – 72
- Non-losing seasons (.500 or better) – 74
- NCAA tourney bids – 47
- All-Americans – 38
- All-conference (1st team) – 119
- NBA MVP winners – 8
- NBA 1st round draft picks – 36
- Olympians – 8
- McDonald's All-Americans – 31
- Naismith Hall of Famers – 9

* Includes 1980 tournament results vacated by NCAA

== Naismith Memorial Basketball Hall of Fame ==
=== UCLA players ===
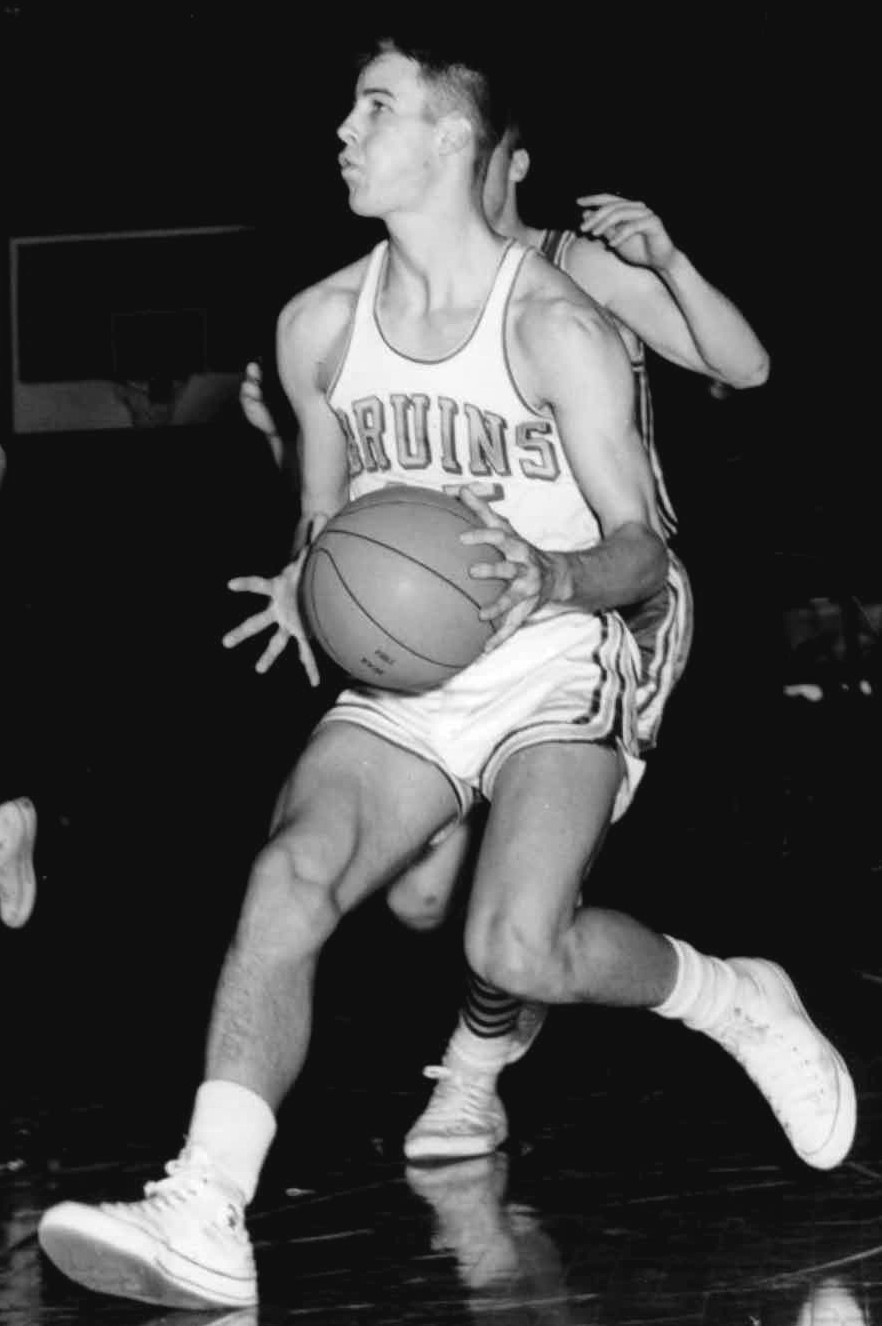
Two-time national champion Gail Goodrich (1964)

All individuals were (or will be) inducted as players unless otherwise noted.

- Kareem Abdul-Jabbar (1995)
- Don Barksdale (2012), contributor
- Gail Goodrich (1996)
- Reggie Miller (2012)
- Bill Walton (1993)
- Jamaal Wilkes (2012)

=== UCLA coaches ===
All individuals were inducted as coaches, though not necessarily for their service at UCLA.

- Larry Brown (2002)
- Denny Crum (1994)
- John Wooden (1972) – Also inducted separately as a player in 1961 for his career at Purdue and in early professional leagues.

== Notable players ==
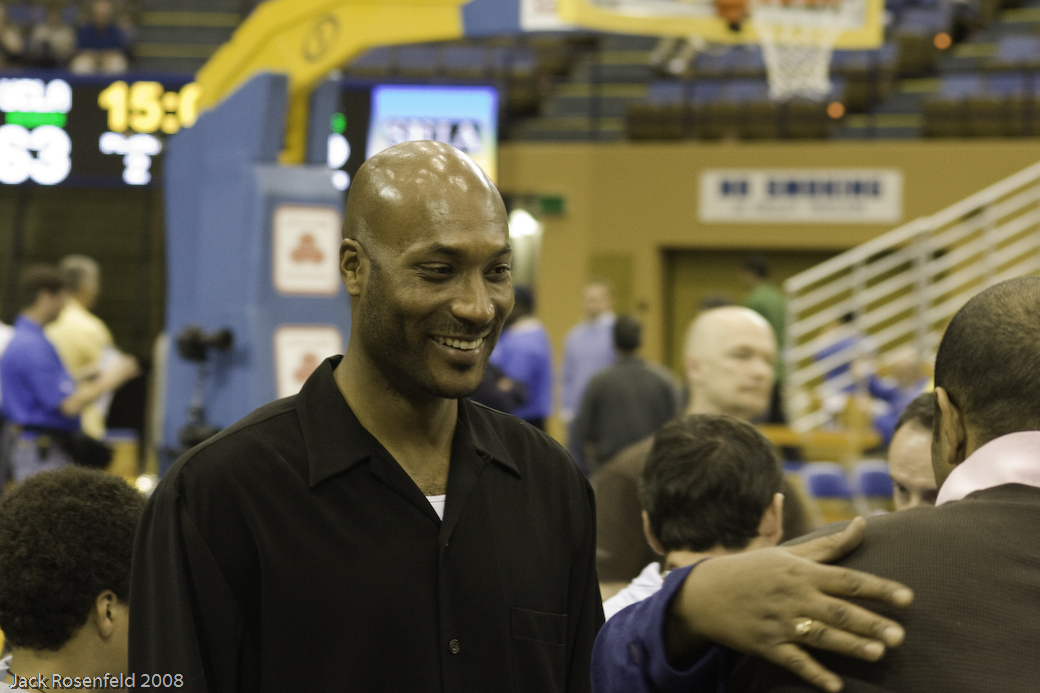
Ed O'Bannon, a member of the 1995 Championship team, was player-of-the-year

Six former UCLA Bruins went on to be named to the Naismith Memorial Basketball Hall of Fame: Kareem Abdul-Jabbar, Reggie Miller, Gail Goodrich, Jamaal Wilkes, Bill Walton and Don Barksdale. Barksdale was also notable as the first player to break many color barriers, including being the first African American to be named an NCAA All-American and NBA All-Star, and the first to be selected to the US Olympic basketball team.

In 2021, when the NBA named its 75th Anniversary Team, four former Bruins were included: Kareem Abdul-Jabbar, Bill Walton, Reggie Miller and Russell Westbrook. UCLA is tied with the University of North Carolina for the most players on the list.

All 14 players who have played on three NCAA Division I Championship basketball teams are from UCLA: Abdul-Jabbar, Sidney Wicks, Curtis Rowe, Lynn Shackelford, Larry Farmer, Henry Bibby, Steve Patterson, Kenny Heitz, Jon Chapman, John Ecker, Andy Hill, Terry Schofield, Bill Sweek, and Larry Hollyfield. (Note: Hollyfield is generally credited with being on three championship teams (1971–1973). While he played in 1970–71, he was ineligible to play in the 1971 postseason due to NCAA restrictions on junior college transfers.)

UCLA became the first school to have a top winner in both basketball and football in the same year with Gary Beban winning the Heisman Trophy and Lew Alcindor (now Kareem Abdul-Jabbar) winning the U.S. Basketball Writers Association player of the year award in 1968.

UCLA has produced the most NBA Most Valuable Player Award winners, six of them by Abdul-Jabbar, one to Walton, who was Abdul-Jabbar's successor, and one to Russell Westbrook. As of the 2026–27 NBA season, 107 former UCLA players have played in the NBA.

At the 2015 NBA All-Star Game and the 2016 NBA All-Star Game, former Bruins Russell Westbrook of the Oklahoma City Thunder was the MVP and Zach LaVine of the Minnesota Timberwolves was the winner of the Slam Dunk Contest.

=== Retired numbers ===
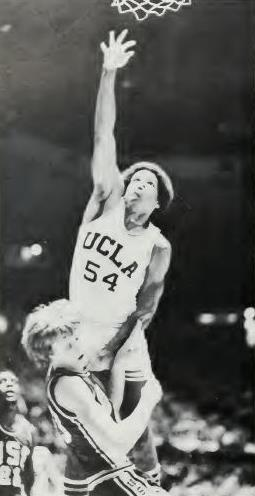
Marques Johnson

UCLA Bruins retired numbers
No.	Player	Position	Career
11	Don Barksdale	F	1946–47
25	Gail Goodrich	G	1962–65
31	Ed O'Bannon	PF	1991–95
31	Reggie Miller	SG	1983–87
32	Bill Walton	C	1971–74
33	Kareem Abdul-Jabbar	C	1966–69
35	Sidney Wicks	PF	1968–71
42	Walt Hazzard	G	1961–64
52	Jamaal Wilkes	SF	1971–74
54	Marques Johnson	SF	1973–77

=== Consensus All-Americans ===
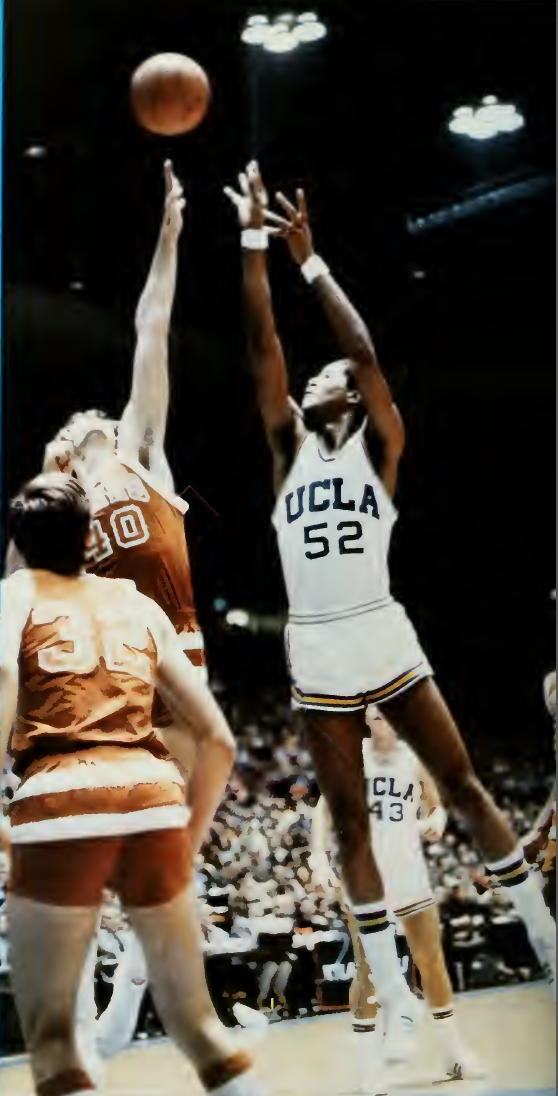
Jamaal Wilkes

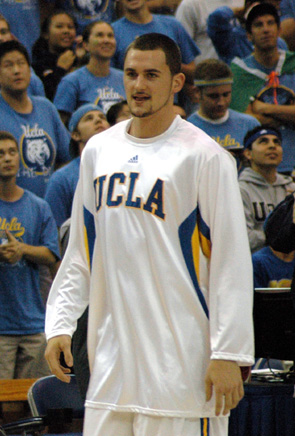
Kevin Love

The following Bruins have been named consensus first-team All-Americans:

Year	Player
1964	Walt Hazzard
1965	Gail Goodrich
1967	Kareem Abdul-Jabbar
1968	Kareem Abdul-Jabbar
1969	Kareem Abdul-Jabbar
1971	Sidney Wicks
1972	Bill Walton
1972	Henry Bibby
1973	Bill Walton
1973	Jamaal Wilkes
1974	Bill Walton
1974	Jamaal Wilkes
1975	Dave Meyers
1976	Richard Washington
1977	Marques Johnson
1978	David Greenwood
1979	David Greenwood
1995	Ed O'Bannon
2007	Arron Afflalo
2008	Kevin Love
2017	Lonzo Ball

== School records ==
=== Individual career ===
Record	Player	Total	Years	Ref
Most points	Don MacLean	2,608	1988–1992	
Highest scoring average	Kareem Abdul-Jabbar	26.4	1966–1969	
Most rebounds	Bill Walton	1,370	1971–1974	
Highest rebounding average	Bill Walton	15.7	1971–1974	
Most assists	Pooh Richardson	833	1985–1989	

=== Team season records ===
Record	Total	Year
Field Goals Made	1210	2017
Field Goals %	55.5	1979
Free Throws Made	642	1956; 1991
Free Throw %	75.6	1979
3-pt. Field Goals Made	354	2017
3-pt. Field Goal %	42.6	1989
Rebounds	1670	1964
Assists	771	2017
Blocked Shots	199	2011

== Career leaders ==
Updated through 2016–17 season

Points
Player	Year	Points
Don MacLean	1988–1992	2,608
Kareem Abdul-Jabbar	1966–1969	2,325
Jason Kapono	1999–2003	2,095
Reggie Miller	1983–1987	2,095
Bryce Alford	2013–2017	1,922
Toby Bailey	1994–1998	1,846
Ed O'Bannon	1991–1995	1,815
J. R. Henderson	1994–1998	1,801
Trevor Wilson	1986–1990	1,798
Tracy Murray	1989–1992	1,792

Rebounds
Player	Year	Rebounds
Bill Walton	1971–1974	1,370
Kareem Abdul-Jabbar	1966–1969	1,367
David Greenwood	1975–1979	1,022
Trevor Wilson	1986–1990	1,001
Don MacLean	1988–1992	992
Willie Naulls	1953–1956	900
Marques Johnson	1973–1977	897
Dan Gadzuric	1998–2002	896
Sidney Wicks	1968–1971	894
Ed O'Bannon	1991–1995	820

Assists
Player	Year	Assists
Pooh Richardson	1985–1989	833
Tyus Edney	1991–1995	652
Darrick Martin	1988–1992	636
Earl Watson	1997–2001	607
Darren Collison	2005–2009	577
Ralph Jackson	1980–1984	523
Roy Hamilton	1975–1979	512
Toby Bailey	1994–1998	458
Cameron Dollar	1993–1997	451
Gerald Madkins	1987–1992	404

== Conferences ==
Years	Conferences	Win–loss	Pct.
1919–1920	None	—	—
1920–1927	Southern California Intercollegiate Athletic Conference (SCIAC)	63–6	.913
1927–1959	Pacific Coast Conference (PCC)		
1959–1968	Athletic Association of Western Universities (AAWU)	99–21	.825
1968–1978	Pacific-8 Conference	129–11	.921
1978–2011	Pacific-10 Conference	365–166	.687
2011–2024	Pac-12 Conference		
2025–	Big Ten Conference		

=== Record vs. former Pac-12 opponents ===
Opponent	Wins	Losses	Pct.	Streak
Arizona	63	48	.568	Arizona 1
Arizona St.	74	24	.755	UCLA 3
Cal	146	103	.586	UCLA 11
Colorado	19	7	.731	UCLA 5
Oregon St.	103	40	.720	UCLA 4
Stanford	151	97	.609	UCLA 4
Utah	18	10	.643	UCLA 7
Washington St.	112	19	.855	UCLA 4

- Note all-time series includes non-conference matchups and the Pac-12 Tournament.

Updated March 20, 2022

=== Record vs. Big Ten Opponents ===
All-time series includes non-conference matchups.

Opponent	Wins	Losses	Pct.	Streak
Illinois	6	4	(.600)	Illinois 1
Indiana	6	3	(.667)	Indiana 1
Iowa	3	5	(.375)	UCLA 1
Maryland	7	3	(.700)	UCLA 2
Michigan	13	6	(.684)	UCLA 1
Michigan State	7	4	(.636)	UCLA 1
Minnesota	5	2	(.714)	UCLA 2
Nebraska	4	1	(.800)	UCLA 3
Northwestern	4	1	(.800)	UCLA 2
Ohio State	6	4	(.600)	Ohio St 1
Oregon	94	42	(.691)	Oregon 1
Penn State	0	1	(.000)	Penn State 1
Purdue	9	1	(.900)	UCLA 7
Rutgers	2	1	(.667)	Rutgers 1
USC	148	113	(.567)	USC 1
Washington	107	43	(.713)	Washington 1
Wisconsin	5	1	(.833)	UCLA 4

Updated April 4, 2024

== See also ==
- NCAA Men's Division I Final Four appearances by coaches
- NCAA Men's Division I Final Four appearances by school
