= Harmon Gym (1879) =

Gymnasium in Berkeley, California

Coordinates: 37.870310°N 122.260057°W

- Interactive map of Harmon Gym (1879)
- Full name: A.K.P. Harmon Gymnasium
- Location: South Drive; Berkeley, California 94720
- Owner: University of California, Berkeley
- Operator: University of California, Berkeley
- Capacity: 1,400 (final)

Construction
- Opened: 1879
- Closed: 1933
- Demolished: 1933
- Cost: $15,000 (original) ($518,304 in 2025 dollars)

Tenant
- California Golden Bears (NCAA) (1907–1933)

The original Harmon Gymnasium was a gymnasium on the campus of the University of California, Berkeley. It was the fourth building built on campus, after North Hall, South Hall and Bacon Hall, and the first built with funds from a private donor. In 1878, Albion Keith Paris Harmon, an Oakland businessman, donated $15,000 ($518,304 in 2025 dollars) to the University for the construction of a gymnasium and assembly hall, which was to be named in his honor. In 1879, the octagonal wooden building opened, north of Strawberry Creek.

The building served as a gymnasium, a theater, assembly hall, dance hall and the headquarters of the military cadet corps. In 1892, it was the site of the first competitive collegiate women's basketball game, between the University's women and Miss Head's School. By 1900 the needs of the campus had outgrown the gymnasium, so the decision was made to expand the building, by cutting the octagon in half, moving one half and building the new gymnasium between the two halves. The expanded Harmon Gym held 1,400 by the time the California Golden Bears men's basketball team started competing in 1907. However, even this expansion proved to not be enough for the growing interest in college basketball. By 1925, only lesser non-conference games were held in the gym, with conference games and important games being held in the Oakland Civic Auditorium. In 1931, construction was started on its replacement, the current Haas Pavilion, which would eventually share the same name as its predecessor from 1959 to 1999. The building was torn down not long after the completion of the new Men's Gymnasium, and in 1950 Dwinelle Hall was built on the site.
