= Fred Cozens =

American basketball, football, and boxing coach

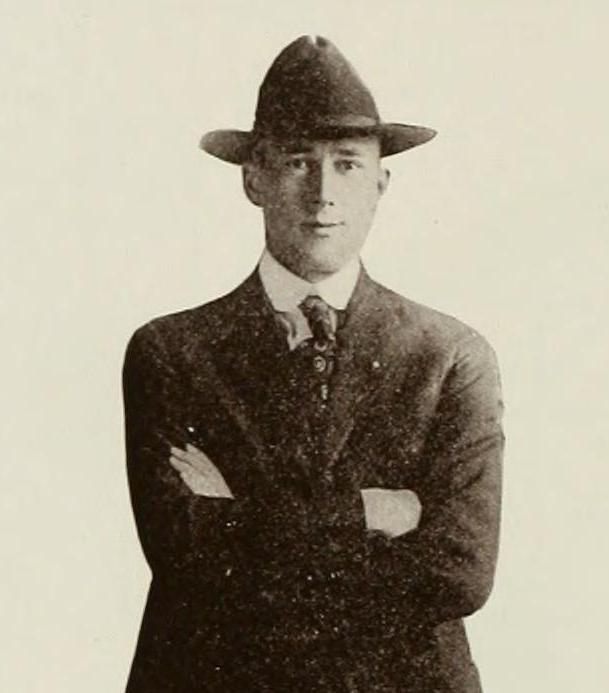
- Cozens at UCLA in 1920

Biographical details
- Born: November 19, 1890; Portland, Oregon, U.S.
- Died: January 2, 1954 (aged 63); Berkeley, California, U.S.

Coaching career (HC unless noted)

Football
- 1919: Southern Branch

Basketball
- 1919–1921: Southern Branch

Baseball
- 1920–1924: Southern Branch

Administrative career (AD unless noted)
- 1919–1942: Southern Branch / UCLA

Head coaching record
- Overall: 2–6 (football); 20–4 (basketball)

Frederick Warren Cozens (November 17, 1890 – January 2, 1954) was an American college basketball, football, and boxing coach. He was the first head coach of both basketball and football at UCLA and served as the school's athletic director from 1919 to 1942.

Cozens was born in Portland, Oregon in 1890. His father, Frederick Cozens (born 1849), has emigrated from England in 1870 and became a salesman at a hardware store in Portland. His mother Carrie E. (Beharrell) Cozens was born in Indiana in 1858. Cozens had an older sister, Ella M. Cozens, born in 1884. He received bachelor's and master's degrees from the University of California in 1915 and 1918, respectively, and a Ph.D. at the University of Oregon in 1928.

Cozens was employed by the University of California for nearly 40 years. He began as a teaching fellow and physical education instructor at Berkeley from 1915 to 1919. In June 1917, he was employed as an instructor of physical education at the University of California at Berkeley, California.

In 1919, Cozens moved to the Southern Branch of the University of California, now known as UCLA, where he served as the Director of Physical Education and Athletics and professor of physical education from 1919 to 1942. He became the first head coach of the Southern Branch men's basketball and football teams in 1919. Cozens remained the Southern Branch's basketball coach through 1921 and guided them to a 20–4 record. His Southern Branch football teams compiled a 2–6 record. The Southern Branch did not participate in an athletic conference until 1920, so the 1919 football team played a schedule full of local high schools and other assorted teams.

In 1932, Cozens was inducted into the National Academy of Kinesiology (formerly the American Academy of Physical Education) as Fellow #32. Cozens also served as the dean of UCLA's college of Applied Arts from 1939 to 1942.

Cozens returned to Berkeley in 1942 and served as a professor and director of physical education from 1942 to 1954. Cozens died in 1954 in Berkeley.

== Personal life ==
Cozens was married to Helen J. Cozens and had two sons, Frederick K. and James B. Cozens.

== Head coaching record ==
=== Football ===
Year	Team	Overall	Conference	Standing	Bowl/playoffs
Southern Branch Cubs (Independent) (1919)
1919	Southern Branch	2–6			
Southern Branch:		2–6			
Total:		2–6			

=== Basketball ===
Record table
Season	Team	Overall	Conference	Standing	Postseason
Southern Branch Cubs (Southern California Intercollegiate Athletic Conference) (1920–1921)
1919–20	Southern Branch	12–2	8–2	2nd	
1920–21	Southern Branch	9–2	9–0	1st	
Southern Branch:		21–4	17–2		
Total:		21–4			
National champion Postseason invitational champion Conference regular season champion Conference regular season and conference tournament champion Division regular season champion Division regular season and conference tournament champion Conference tournament champion
