= Wilbur Johns =

American basketball coach and administrator (1903–1967)

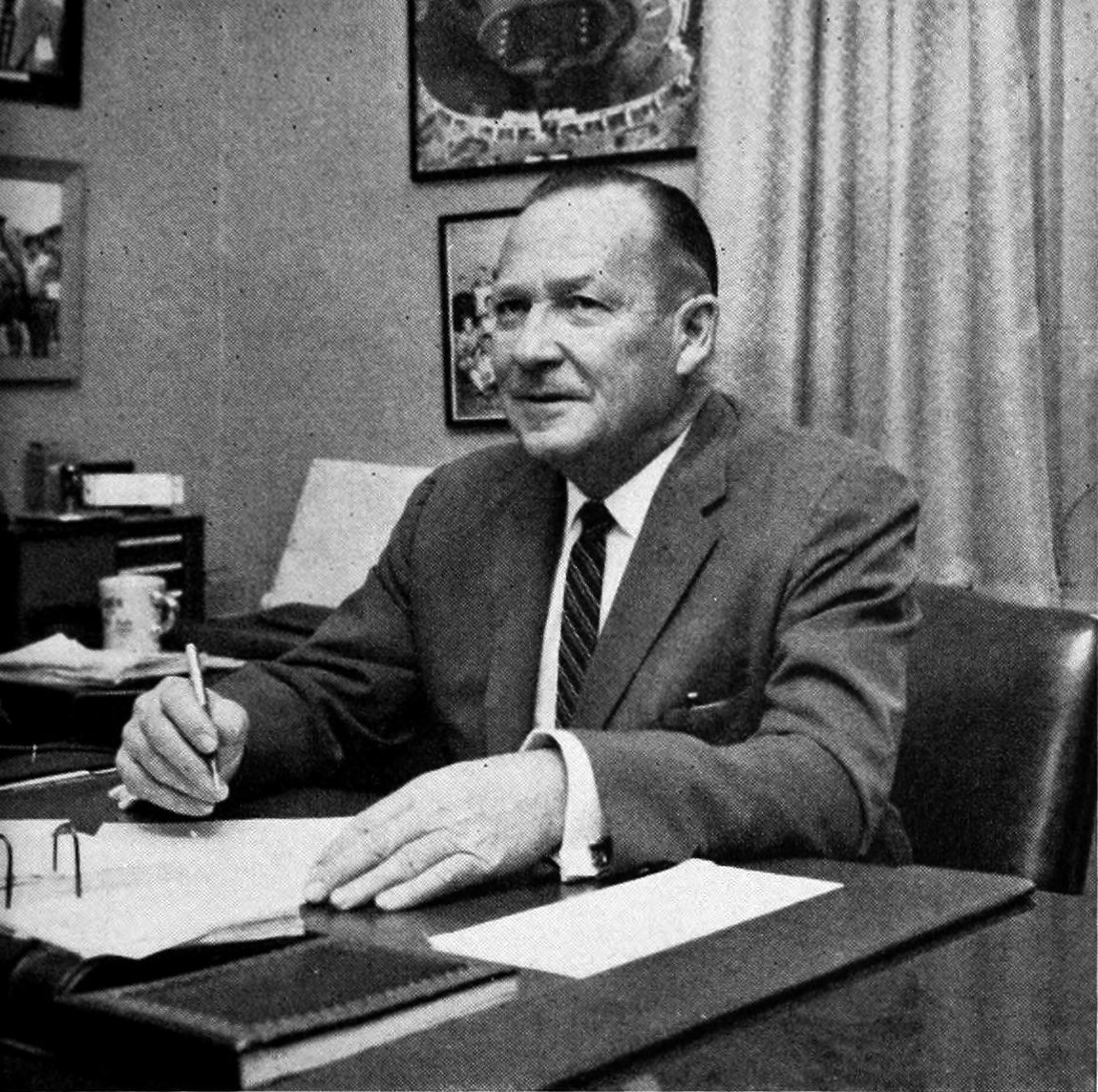
- Johns in 1960

Biographical details
- Born: December 8, 1903; Los Angeles, California, U.S.
- Died: July 14, 1967 (aged 63); Los Angeles, California, U.S.

Playing career
- 1921–1925: Southern Branch

Coaching career (HC unless noted)
- 1939–1948: UCLA

Administrative career (AD unless noted)
- 1947–1963: UCLA

Head coaching record
- Overall: 93–120

Accomplishments and honors

Championships
- 2 PCC (1945, 1947)

Wilbur Johns (December 8, 1903 – July 14, 1967) was an American men's college basketball coach and athletics administrator. He was the head basketball coach at the University of California, Los Angeles (UCLA), prior to John Wooden, serving from 1939 to 1948, and guiding the UCLA Bruins to a 93–120 record in nine seasons. Johns was also the school's athletic director following from 1947 to 1963. He is a 1985 inductee to the UCLA Athletics Hall of Fame. He died at his home at age 63 on July 14, 1967.

Johns played four years basketball at UCLA, graduating in 1925.

== Head coaching record ==
Record table
Season	Team	Overall	Conference	Standing	Postseason
UCLA Bruins (Pacific Coast Conference) (1939–1948)
1939–40	UCLA	8–17	3–9	4th (South)	
1940–41	UCLA	6–20	2–10	4th (South)	
1941–42	UCLA	5–18	2–10	4th (South)	
1942–43	UCLA	14–7	4–4	2nd (South)	
1943–44	UCLA	10–10	3–3	2nd (South)	
1944–45	UCLA	12–12	3–1	1st (South)	
1945–46	UCLA	8–16	5–7	3rd (South)	
1946–47	UCLA	18–7	9–3	1st (South)	
1947–48	UCLA	12–13	3–9	3rd (South)	
UCLA:		93–120	34–56		
Total:		93–120			
National champion Postseason invitational champion Conference regular season champion Conference regular season and conference tournament champion Division regular season champion Division regular season and conference tournament champion Conference tournament champion
