= 2005–06 Virginia Tech Hokies men's basketball team =

American college basketball season

2005–06 Virginia Tech Hokies men's basketball
- Conference: Atlantic Coast Conference
- Record: 14–16 (4–12 ACC)
- Head coach: Seth Greenberg
- Home arena: Cassell Coliseum

2005–06 ACC men's basketball standings
	Conf.				Overall
Team	W		L	PCT	W		L	PCT
No. 1 Duke†	14	–	2	.875	32	–	4	.889
No. 10 North Carolina	12	–	4	.750	23	–	8	.742
No. 7 Boston College	11	–	5	.688	28	–	8	.778
NC State	10	–	6	.625	22	–	10	.688
Florida State	9	–	7	.563	20	–	10	.667
Maryland	8	–	8	.500	19	–	13	.594
Virginia	7	–	9	.438	15	–	15	.500
Miami (FL)	7	–	9	.438	18	–	16	.529
Clemson	7	–	9	.438	19	–	13	.594
Virginia Tech	4	–	12	.250	14	–	16	.467
Georgia Tech	4	–	12	.250	11	–	17	.393
Wake Forest	3	–	13	.188	17	–	17	.500
† 2006 ACC tournament winner Rankings from AP Poll

The 2005–06 Virginia Tech Hokies men's basketball team represented Virginia Polytechnic Institute and State University during the 2005–06 NCAA Division I men's basketball season. The Hokies were led by third-year head coach Seth Greenberg and played their home games at Cassell Coliseum in Blacksburg, Virginia as second-year members of the Atlantic Coast Conference. They finished the season 14–16, 4–12 in ACC play to finish a tie for tenth place. As the No. 10 seed in the ACC tournament, they were defeated in the first round by Virginia 60–56.

== Last season ==
The Hokies finished the 2004–05 season 16–14, 8–8 in ACC play to finish in a tie for fourth place. They were defeated 73–54 by Georgia Tech in the quarterfinals of the ACC tournament. They were invited to the National Invitation Tournament where they defeated Temple in the first round to advance to the second round where they lost to Memphis.

== Roster ==
2005–06 Virginia Tech Hokies men's basketball team
Players
Coaches

Pos.	#	Name	Height	Weight	Year	Previous school	Hometown
G	1	Zabian Dowdell	6 ft 3 in (1.91 m)	200 lb (91 kg)	Jr	Pahokee	Pahokee, FL
G	3	Shawn Harris	6 ft 4 in (1.93 m)	220 lb (100 kg)	Sr	Matoaca/Fork Union Military Academy	Ettrick, VA
G/F	11	Wynton Witherspoon	6 ft 7 in (2.01 m)	185 lb (84 kg)	So	Berkmar	Atlanta, GA
G/F	13	Deron Washington	6 ft 7 in (2.01 m)	195 lb (88 kg)	So	National Christian Academy	New Orleans, LA
F/C	14	Robert Krabbendam	7 ft 0 in (2.13 m)	230 lb (104 kg)	So	Copernicus	Hoorn, The Netherlands
F	15	Terrance Vinson	6 ft 8 in (2.03 m)	210 lb (95 kg)	Fr	Lowndes	Valdosta, GA
F	21	Allen Calloway	6 ft 8 in (2.03 m)	215 lb (98 kg)	Sr	Tunstall/Coastal Christian Academy	Danville, VA
G	22	Jamon Gordon	6 ft 3 in (1.91 m)	200 lb (91 kg)	Jr	Andrew Jackson	Jacksonville, FL
G	23	Marcus Travis	6 ft 3 in (1.91 m)	210 lb (95 kg)	Jr	Blacksburg/Oxnard Junior College	Blacksburg, VA
G	24	Markus Sailes	6 ft 5 in (1.96 m)	210 lb (95 kg)		Varina	Richmond, VA
G/F	25	Bob Ritchie	6 ft 5 in (1.96 m)	190 lb (86 kg)	Sr	Lake Braddock	Burke, VA
F	33	Coleman Collins	6 ft 9 in (2.06 m)	235 lb (107 kg)	Jr	Chamblee	Stone Mountain, GA
F	34	Cheick Diakite	6 ft 8 in (2.03 m)	230 lb (104 kg)	Fr	Bridgton Academy	Bamako, Mali
G/F	40	A. D. Vassallo	6 ft 6 in (1.98 m)	213 lb (97 kg)	Fr	Hargrave Military Academy	Toa Baja, PR
F	42	Chris Tucker	6 ft 7 in (2.01 m)	220 lb (100 kg)	Jr	Lord Botetourt/Fork Union Military Academy	Fincastle, VA

Head coach

- Seth Greenberg (Fairleigh Dickinson)

Assistant coach(es)

Legend

- (C) Team captain
- (S) Suspended
- (I) Ineligible
- (W) Walk-on
- Injured
- Current redshirt

Roster
Last update: January 17, 2020

== 2005–2006 schedule and results ==
Date time, TV	Rank^{#}	Opponent^{#}	Result	Record	Site city, state
Regular season
Nov 10, 2005*		Radford	W 80–50	1–0	Cassell Coliseum; Blacksburg, VA
Nov 12, 2005*		Bowling Green	L 71–72	1–1	Cassell Coliseum; Blacksburg, VA
Nov 13, 2005*		Western Carolina	W 54–40	2–1	Cassell Coliseum; Blacksburg, VA
Nov 18, 2005*		Mount St. Mary's	W 74–62	3–1	Cassell Coliseum; Blacksburg VA
Nov 21, 2005*		Marshall	W 71–54	4–1	Cassell Coliseum; Blacksburg VA
Nov 25, 2005*		Morgan State	W 77–49	5–1	Cassell Coliseum; Blacksburg, VA
Nov 28, 2005*; 7:30 pm, ESPN2		at Ohio State; ACC-Big Ten Challenge	L 56-69 ^{OT}	5–2	Value City Arena (13,218); Columbus, OH
Dec 4, 2005; 8:00 pm, FSN		at No. 1 Duke	L 75–77	5–3 (0-1)	Cameron Indoor Stadium (9,314); Durham, NC
Dec 7, 2005*		North Carolina A&T	W 94–66	6–3 (0-1)	Cassell Coliseum; Blacksburg, VA
Dec 10, 2005*; 4:00 pm, FSN		St. John's	W 73–64	7–3 (0-1)	Cassell Coliseum (9,847); Blacksburg, VA
Dec 18, 2005*		vs. Stanford; The Las Vegas Showdown	W 59–52	8–3 (0-1)	Thomas & Mack Center (10,011); Las Vegas, NV
Dec 27, 2005*		William & Mary	W 74–64	9–3 (0-1)	Cassell Coliseum; Blacksburg, VA
Dec 30, 2005*		at Old Dominion	L 55–58	9–4 (0-1)	Ted Constant Convocation Center; Norfolk, VA
Jan 2, 2006*		at James Madison	W 77–58	10–4 (0-1)	James Madison University Convocation Center; Harrisonburg, VA
Jan 7, 2006		at Florida State	L 68–74	10–5 (0-2)	Donald L. Tucker Civic Center; Tallahassee, FL
Jan 10, 2006		No. 20 North Carolina	L 61–64	10–6 (0-3)	Cassell Coliseum; Blacksburg, VA
Jan 15, 2006; 4:00 pm, Raycom		Virginia; Rivalry	L 49–54	10–7 (0-4)	Cassell Coliseum (9,847); Blacksburg, VA
Jan 21, 2006		at Maryland	L 72–81	10–8 (0-5)	Comcast Center; College Park, MD
Jan 26, 2006; 7:00 pm, ESPN		No. 2 Duke	L 67–80	10–9 (0-6)	Cassell Coliseum (9,847); Blacksburg, VA
Jan 28, 2006		at Wake Forest	W 76–70	11–9 (1-6)	Lawrence Joel Veterans Memorial Coliseum; Winston-Salem, NC
Jan 31, 2006		Georgia Tech	W 63–62	12–9 (2-6)	Cassell Coliseum; Blacksburg, VA
Feb 4, 2006		Boston College	L 73–74	12–10 (2-7)	Cassell Coliseum; Blacksburg, VA
Feb 8, 2006		at Clemson	W 75–74 ^{OT}	13–10 (3-7)	Littlejohn Coliseum; Clemson, SC
Feb 11, 2006; 8:00 pm, Raycom		at Virginia; Rivalry	L 77–81 ^{OT}	13–11 (3-8)	University Hall (7,757); Charlottesville, VA
Feb 18, 2006		NC State	L 64–70	13–12 (3-9)	Cassell Coliseum; Blacksburg, VA
Feb 22, 2006		at Miami	L 59–70	13–13 (3-10)	BankUnited Center; Coral Gables, FL
Feb 25, 2006		Florida State	W 72–61	14–13 (4-10)	Cassell Coliseum; Blacksburg, VA
Mar 1, 2006		Clemson	L 81–86	14–14 (4-11)	Cassell Coliseum; Blacksburg, VA
Mar 4, 2006; 12:00 p.m.		at No. 11 Boston College	L 57–59	14–15 (4-12)	Conte Forum; Chestnut Hill, MA
ACC tournament
Mar 9, 2006; 7:00 pm, ESPN	(10)	vs. (7) Virginia; First Round	L 56–60	14–16 (4-12)	Greensboro Coliseum; Greensboro, NC
*Non-conference game. ^{#}Rankings from AP Poll. (#) Tournament seedings in parentheses. All times are in Eastern Time.
