= 2005–06 Florida State Seminoles men's basketball team =

American college basketball season

2005–06 Florida State Seminoles men's basketball

Orange Bowl Basketball Classic Champion

NIT, Second Round
- Conference: Atlantic Coast Conference
- Record: 20–10 (9–7 ACC)
- Head coach: Leonard Hamilton (4th season)
- Home arena: Donald L. Tucker Civic Center

2005–06 ACC men's basketball standings
| | Conf. | | | | Overall |
| Team | W | | L | PCT | W | | L | PCT |
|---|---|---|---|---|---|---|---|---|
| No. 1 Duke† | 14 | – | 2 | .875 | 32 | – | 4 | .889 |
| No. 10 North Carolina | 12 | – | 4 | .750 | 23 | – | 8 | .742 |
| No. 7 Boston College | 11 | – | 5 | .688 | 28 | – | 8 | .778 |
| NC State | 10 | – | 6 | .625 | 22 | – | 10 | .688 |
| Florida State | 9 | – | 7 | .563 | 20 | – | 10 | .667 |
| Maryland | 8 | – | 8 | .500 | 19 | – | 13 | .594 |
| Virginia | 7 | – | 9 | .438 | 15 | – | 15 | .500 |
| Miami (FL) | 7 | – | 9 | .438 | 18 | – | 16 | .529 |
| Clemson | 7 | – | 9 | .438 | 19 | – | 13 | .594 |
| Virginia Tech | 4 | – | 12 | .250 | 14 | – | 16 | .467 |
| Georgia Tech | 4 | – | 12 | .250 | 11 | – | 17 | .393 |
| Wake Forest | 3 | – | 13 | .188 | 17 | – | 17 | .500 |
† 2006 ACC tournament winner Rankings from AP Poll

The 2005–06 Florida State Seminoles men's basketball team represented Florida State University in the 2005–06 NCAA Division I men's basketball season. The team was coached by Leonard Hamilton.

On December 31, 2005, Florida State defeated Nebraska 74-60 in the Orange Bowl Basketball Classic.

The Seminoles would end the regular season fifth in the ACC standings, losing in the first round of the ACC tournament to 12 seed Wake Forest. They were invited to the NIT where they defeated Butler before losing to South Carolina in the second round to finish the season with a record of 20–10 (9–7 ACC).

== Schedule and results ==
| Date time, TV | Rank^{#} | Opponent^{#} | Result | Record | Site city, state |
Regular season
| Nov 19, 2005*; 7:00 p.m., FSN | | at Jacksonville | W 78–48 | 1–0 | Jacksonville Veterans Memorial Arena (5,688); Jacksonville, Florida |
| Nov 21, 2005*; 7:00 p.m. | | Alcorn State | W 85–67 | 2–0 | Donald L. Tucker Civic Center (5,550); Tallahassee, Florida |
| Nov 25, 2005*; 7:00 p.m., FSN | | at No. 14 Florida | L 66–74 | 2–1 | O'Connell Center (12,599); Gainesville, Florida |
| Nov 29, 2005*; 7:30 p.m., ESPN2 | | Purdue; ACC–Big Ten Challenge | W 97–57 | 3–1 | Donald L. Tucker Civic Center (7,022); Tallahassee, Florida |
| Dec 2, 2005*; 8:00 p.m., FSN | | Louisiana–Monroe | W 85–62 | 4–1 | Donald L. Tucker Civic Center (6,009); Tallahassee, Florida |
| Dec 7, 2005*; 7:00 p.m. | | Texas Southern | W 90–59 | 5–1 | Donald L. Tucker Civic Center (5,508); Tallahassee, Florida |
| Dec 17, 2005*; 7:30 p.m. | | vs. Bowling Green; Coors Classic | W 71–60 | 6–1 | Mitchell Center (5,688); Mobile, Alabama |
| Dec 20, 2005*; 7:00 p.m., FSN | | Stetson | W 75–57 | 7–1 | Donald L. Tucker Civic Center (4,830); Tallahassee, Florida |
| Dec 22, 2005*; 7:00 p.m. | | Campbell | W 108–73 | 8–1 | Donald L. Tucker Civic Center (4,684); Tallahassee, Florida |
| Dec 31, 2005*; 1:30 p.m., FSN | | vs. Nebraska; Orange Bowl Basketball Classic | W 74–60 | 9–1 | BankAtlantic Center; Sunrise, Florida |
| Jan 4, 2006; 7:00 p.m. | | at Clemson | L 55–61 | 9–2 (0–1) | Littlejohn Coliseum (4,800); Clemson, South Carolina |
| Jan 7, 2006; 7:00 p.m., FSN | | Virginia Tech | W 74–68 | 10–2 (1–1) | Donald L. Tucker Civic Center (6,357); Tallahassee, Florida |
| Jan 11, 2006; 7:00 p.m. | | at Virginia | W 87–82 ^{OT} | 11–2 (2–1) | University Hall (7,556); Charlottesville, Virginia |
| Jan 14, 2006; 2:00 p.m. | | at No. 15 Boston College | L 87–90 | 11–3 (2–2) | Conte Forum (8,606); Chestnut Hill, Massachusetts |
| Jan 22, 2006; 6:30 p.m., FSN | | No. 24 North Carolina | L 80–81 | 11–4 (2–3) | Donald L. Tucker Civic Center (11,589); Tallahassee, Florida |
| Jan 24, 2006; 7:00 p.m., FSN | | at Wake Forest | W 75–68 | 12–4 (3–3) | Lawrence Joel Veterans Memorial Coliseum (14,665); Winston-Salem, North Carolina |
| Jan 29, 2006; 4:00 p.m., Raycom | | Miami | L 78–84 ^{OT} | 12–5 (3–4) | Donald L. Tucker Civic Center (8,948); Tallahassee, Florida |
| Feb 1, 2006; 7:00 p.m. | | Clemson | W 69–59 | 13–5 (4–4) | Donald L. Tucker Civic Center (7,307); Tallahassee, Florida |
| Feb 4, 2006; 12:00 p.m., FSN | | at No. 2 Duke | L 96–97 ^{OT} | 13–6 (4–5) | Cameron Indoor Stadium (9,314); Durham, North Carolina |
| Feb 9, 2006; 7:00 p.m., ESPNU | | Georgia Tech | W 80–79 | 14–6 (5–5) | Donald L. Tucker Civic Center (8,011); Tallahassee, Florida |
| Feb 12, 2006*; 5:30 p.m., FSN | | UMass | W 73–63 | 15–6 | Donald L. Tucker Civic Center (7,813); Tallahassee, Florida |
| Feb 15, 2006; 7:00 p.m., ESPNU | | at No. 21 NC State | L 64–86 | 15–7 (5–6) | RBC Center (17,103); Raleigh, North Carolina |
| Feb 18, 2006; 4:00 p.m., Raycom | | Virginia | W 76–62 | 16–7 (6–6) | Donald L. Tucker Civic Center (8,567); Tallahassee, Florida |
| Feb 22, 2006; 9:00 p.m., Raycom | | Maryland | W 71–60 | 17–7 (7–6) | Donald L. Tucker Civic Center (8,751); Tallahassee, Florida |
| Feb 25, 2006; 7:00 p.m. | | at Virginia Tech | L 61–72 | 17–8 (7–7) | Cassell Coliseum (9,847); Blacksburg, Virginia |
| Mar 1, 2006; 7:00 p.m., ESPN | | at No. 1 Duke | W 79–74 | 18–8 (8–7) | Donald L. Tucker Civic Center (12,100); Tallahassee, Florida |
| Mar 5, 2006; 1:00 p.m., Raycom | | at Miami | W 67–64 | 19–8 (9–7) | BankUnited Center (5,809); Coral Gables, Florida |
ACC Tournament
| Mar 9, 2006; 2:30 p.m., Raycom | (5) | vs. (12) Wake Forest; First round | L 66–78 | 19–9 | Greensboro Coliseum (23,745); Greensboro, North Carolina |
NIT
| Mar 17, 2006*; 7:00 p.m. | (2) | (8) Butler; First round | W 67–63 | 20–9 | Donald L. Tucker Civic Center (5,187); Tallahassee, Florida |
| Mar 21, 2006*; 7:00 p.m. | (2) | (3) South Carolina; Second round | L 68–69 ^{OT} | 20–10 | Donald L. Tucker Civic Center (6,130); Tallahassee, Florida |
*Non-conference game. ^{#}Rankings from AP Poll. (#) Tournament seedings in parentheses. All times are in Eastern Time.
