= Marcus Ginyard =

American basketball player (born 1987)

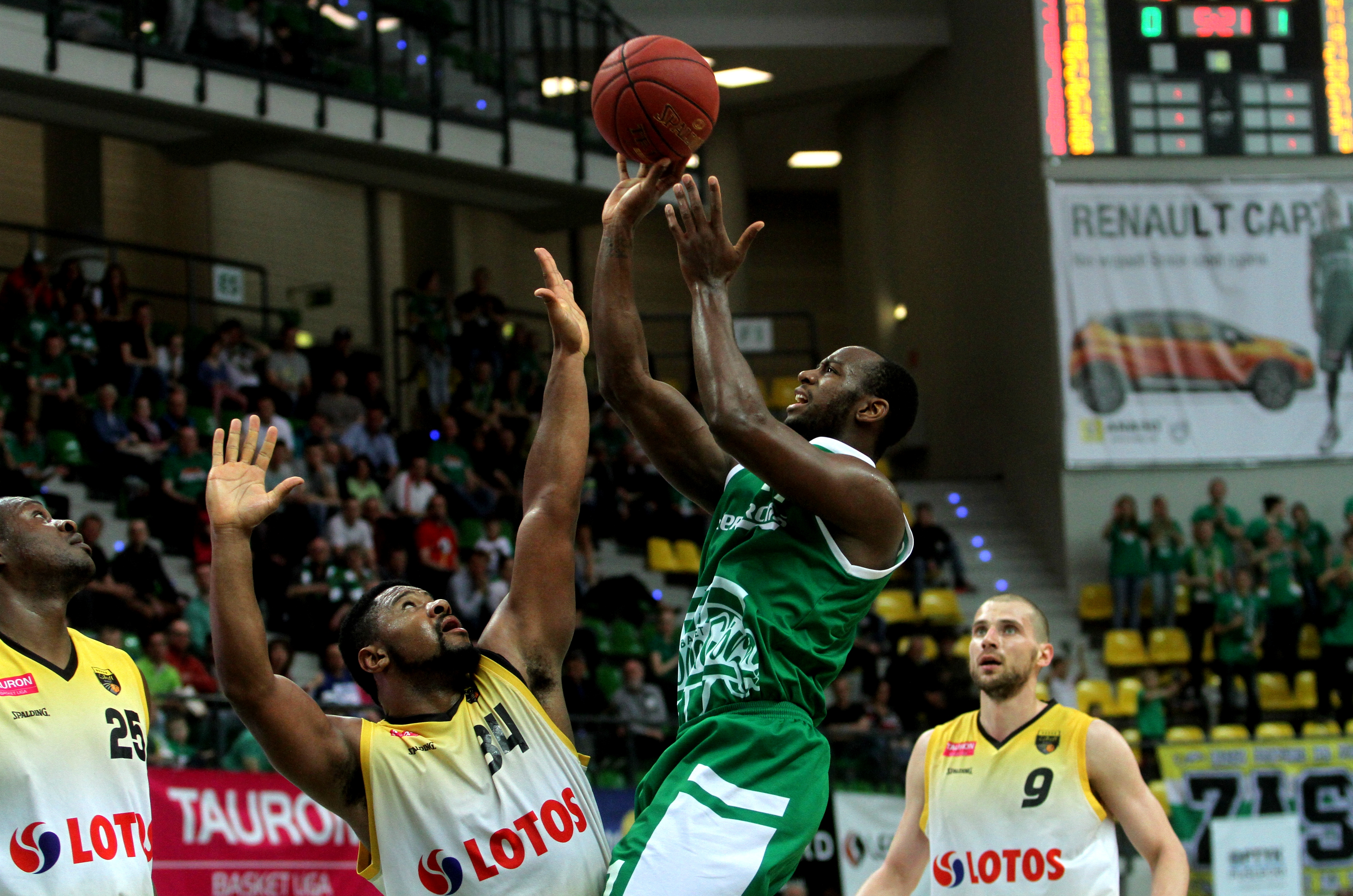
- Ginyard in 2014

Personal information
- Born: May 8, 1987 (age 39) Rochester, New York, U.S.
- Listed height: 6 ft 5 in (1.96 m)
- Listed weight: 214 lb (97 kg)

Career information
- High school: Bishop O'Connell High School (Arlington County, Virginia)
- College: North Carolina (2005–2010)
- NBA draft: 2010: undrafted
- Playing career: 2010–2022
- Position: Small forward / shooting guard

Career history
- 2010–2011: BBC Bayreuth
- 2011–2012: Ironi Nahariya
- 2012–2013: Anwil Włocławek
- 2013–2014: Azovmash Mariupol
- 2014: Stelmet Zielona Góra
- 2014–2015: Westchester Knicks
- 2015: Panionios
- 2015–2016: Hermine de Nantes Atlantique
- 2016–2017: Czarni Słupsk
- 2017–2018: Rabotnički
- 2018–2019: CSM Oradea
- 2019: Arka Gdynia
- 2019–2021: Limoges CSP

Career highlights
- Macedonian League champion (2018); NCAA champion (2009); All-ACC Defensive Team (2008); Virginia Mr. Basketball (2005)

Marcus Darrel Ginyard (born May 8, 1987) is an American former professional basketball player. He played college basketball for the North Carolina Tar Heels after a high school career at Bishop O'Connell High School in Arlington County, Virginia.

== High school career ==
Ginyard attended Bishop Denis J. O'Connell High School where he was coached by Joseph Wootten. Ginyard started all four years while there, leaving with 116 wins to only 19 losses during his tenure there. His accolades include 3 Virginia Independent Schools Division I state champions (2002, 2003, 2005), MVP of Alhambra Invitational, MVP of the 2004 GlaxoSmithKline Holiday Invitational, first-team All-Metro by the Washington Post, first-team All-Northern Virginia, Virginia Independent Schools Player of the Year, and Gatorade Player of the Year and Mr. Basketball in Virginia. Ginyard's high school statistics include 1,615 points (14.2 per game), 520 rebounds (4.6 per game), 298 steals, and 289 assists.

== College career ==
While at the University of North Carolina, Ginyard became known as a defensive specialist. During his career, he was defensive player of the game 20 times out of the 107 games that he played. He started 55 of those 107 games. In the 2006–07 and 2007–08 seasons, Ginyard was voted the University of North Carolina's defensive player of the year. In addition, he was voted to the media and coaches' Atlantic Coast Conference all-defensive teams in the 2007–08 season, as well as Atlantic Coast Conference All-Tournament Team honors for the same year. Ginyard's game was not restricted to his defensive abilities either, evident in the fact that he scored over 600 points in his career. His versatility was useful as wellwhile in college, and he played four out of five positions. However, early in his senior season (2008–2009) Ginyard sustained a stress fracture in his left foot that forced him to take a medical redshirt. The Tar Heels men's basketball team won the 2009 NCAA Men's Division I Basketball Tournament, with Ginyard supporting the team as the "No. 1 Cheerleader," according to teammate Bobby Frasor.

=== Career highs ===
- Points: 17 vs. UC Santa Barbara (12/22/07)
- Field Goals: 8 vs. UC Santa Barbara (12/22/07)
- Three-Pointers Made: 2 at Virginia (1/19/06), vs. Maryland (1/19/08), Duke (2/6/08), Florida State (3/14/08)
- Free Throws Made: 8 vs. Duke (2/6/08)
- Rebounds: 10 at Clemson (1/6/08)
- Offensive Rebounds: 5 vs. Ohio State (11/29/06), at Ohio State (11/28/07)
- Assists: 6 vs. Wake Forest (2/24/08), Arkansas (3/23/08)
- Turnovers: 6 vs. Wake Forest (2/24/08)
- Blocks: 2 at Davidson (11/14/07)
- Steals: 4 vs. Gardner Webb (11/19/05), Illinois (11/29/05), Davidson (1/3/06)

== College Stats ==
Legend
GP	Games played	GS	Games started	MPG	Minutes per game
FG%	Field goal percentage	3P%	3-point field goal percentage	FT%	Free throw percentage
RPG	Rebounds per game	APG	Assists per game	SPG	Steals per game
BPG	Blocks per game	PPG	Points per game	**Bold**	Career high

Year	Team	GP	GS	MPG	FG%	3P%	FT%	RPG	APG	SPG	BPG	PPG
2005–06	North Carolina	31	14	19.1	.407	.244	.721	2.6	1.2	.9	0	6.3
2006–07	North Carolina	37	2	16.9	**.473**	.273	**.792**	3.2	1.5	1.1	**.1**	4.1
2007–08	North Carolina	**39**	**39**	28.2	.441	**.400**	.649	4.5	2.2	1.1	**.1**	6.9
2008–09	North Carolina	3	0	12.3	.250	–	.500	2.7	1.3	.7	0	1.3
2009–10	North Carolina	33	31	**30.6**	.406	.309	.671	**4.9**	**2.8**	**1.2**	**.1**	**7.7**
Career		143	86	23.5	.426	.307	.696	3.8	1.9	1.1	.1	6.1

== Professional career ==
=== Bayreuth (2010–2011) ===
After going undrafted in the 2010 NBA draft, Ginyard joined the Charlotte Bobcats for the 2010 NBA Summer League.

On July 17, 2010, he signed with BBC Bayreuth of Germany for the 2010–11 season.

=== Ironi Nahariya (2011–2012) ===
On October 5, 2011, Ginyard signed with Ironi Nahariya of Israel for the 2011–12 season.

=== Anwil Włocławek (2012–2013) ===
On July 23, 2012, Ginyard signed with Anwil Włocławek of Poland for the 2012–13 season.

=== Azovmash (2013–2014) ===
On August 12, 2013, Ginyard signed with Azovmash Mariupol of Ukraine for the 2013–14 season. On March 3, 2014, he parted ways with Azovmash due to the pro-Russian unrest in eastern Ukraine.

=== Zielona Góra (2014) ===
On March 28, 2014, he signed with Stelmet Zielona Góra for the rest of the season.

=== Westchester Knicks (2014–2015) ===
On November 3, 2014, Ginyard was acquired by the Westchester Knicks of the NBA Development League. On February 13, 2015, he was waived by Westchester after a season-ending injury.

=== Panionios (2015) ===
On March 13, 2015, he signed with Greek club Panionios for the rest of the 2014–15 Greek Basket League season.

=== Hermine Nantes (2015–2016) ===
For the 2015–16 season, he signed with Hermine de Nantes Atlantique of the French LNB Pro B.

=== Czarni Słupsk (2016–2017) ===
On August 19, 2016, Ginyard signed with Polish club Czarni Słupsk for the 2016–17 season.

=== Rabotnički (2017–2018) ===
On August 22, 2017, Ginyard signed with Macedonian basketball club Rabotnički.

=== Limoges CSP (2019–2021) ===
On June 21, 2019, Ginyard signed a deal with Limoges CSP of the LNB Pro A.

On January 5, 2022, Ginyard announced his retirement from professional basketball.

== Personal life ==
Ginyard was born in Rochester, New York to parents Ronald Ginyard Sr. and Annise Ginyard. At a young age, the Ginyards moved to the northern Virginia area, specifically Woodbridge and Alexandria.

Annise provided an early basketball introduction to her son. She played basketball in the Marine Corps basketball league until her career was ended due to an injury. Annise continues to stay involved with basketball; she is a strength and conditioning coach for Bishop O'Connell High School.

Ronald Ginyard Sr. was a Marine in the Pentagon during the September 11, 2001 attacks.

At Bishop O'Connell High School, Ginyard was a National Honor Society member and a National Merit Scholar, and at the University of North Carolina, he majored in communications.
