= 2005–06 Boston College Eagles men's basketball team =

American college basketball season

2005–06 Boston College Eagles men's basketball
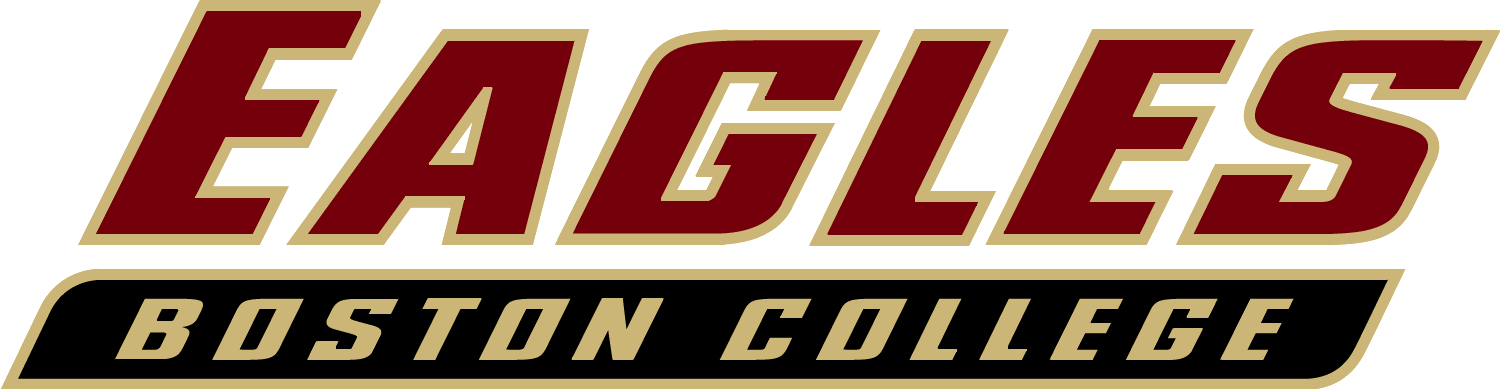

NCAA tournament, Sweet Sixteen
- Conference: Atlantic Coast Conference

Ranking
- Coaches: No. 11
- AP: No. 7
- Record: 28–8 (11–5 ACC)
- Head coach: Al Skinner (9th season)
- Home arena: Conte Forum

2005–06 ACC men's basketball standings
	Conf.				Overall
Team	W		L	PCT	W		L	PCT
No. 1 Duke†	14	–	2	.875	32	–	4	.889
No. 10 North Carolina	12	–	4	.750	23	–	8	.742
No. 7 Boston College	11	–	5	.688	28	–	8	.778
NC State	10	–	6	.625	22	–	10	.688
Florida State	9	–	7	.563	20	–	10	.667
Maryland	8	–	8	.500	19	–	13	.594
Virginia	7	–	9	.438	15	–	15	.500
Miami (FL)	7	–	9	.438	18	–	16	.529
Clemson	7	–	9	.438	19	–	13	.594
Virginia Tech	4	–	12	.250	14	–	16	.467
Georgia Tech	4	–	12	.250	11	–	17	.393
Wake Forest	3	–	13	.188	17	–	17	.500
† 2006 ACC tournament winner Rankings from AP Poll

The 2005–06 Boston College Eagles men's basketball team played college basketball for the Boston College Eagles as a member of the Atlantic Coast Conference during the 2005–06 NCAA Division I men's basketball season. Led by head coach Al Skinner, the team played their home games at the Conte Forum in Chestnut Hill, Massachusetts. After finishing third in the ACC regular season standings, the Eagles reached the finals of the ACC Tournament before losing to Duke. The team received an at-large bid to the NCAA tournament as the No. 4 seed in the Midwest region. BC defeated Pacific and Montana to reach the Sweet Sixteen where they were beaten by No. 1 seed Villanova 60–59 in overtime. The team finished with an overall record of 28–8 (11–5 ACC).

== Roster ==
2005–06 Boston College Eagles men's basketball team
Players
Coaches

Pos.	#	Name	Height	Weight	Year	Previous school	Hometown
G	0	MarQuez Haynes	6 ft 3 in (1.91 m)	185 lb (84 kg)	Fr	Irving HS	Irving, Texas
F	1	Craig Smith	6 ft 7 in (2.01 m)	250 lb (113 kg)	Sr	Fairfax HS	Inglewood, California
F	3	Jared Dudley	6 ft 7 in (2.01 m)	225 lb (102 kg)	Jr	Horizon HS	San Diego, California
G	4	Tyrese Rice	6 ft 0 in (1.83 m)	183 lb (83 kg)	Fr	L. C. Bird HS	Richmond, Virginia
F	5	Akida McLain	6 ft 8 in (2.03 m)	220 lb (100 kg)	So	Penn Hills HS	Pittsburgh, Pennsylvania
G	11	Louis Hinnant	6 ft 4 in (1.93 m)	190 lb (86 kg)	Sr	Gwynn Park HS	Oxon Hill, Maryland
G	21	Tyler Neville	6 ft 3 in (1.91 m)	200 lb (91 kg)	Sr	Ridgewood HS	Ridgewood, New Jersey
G	23	Sean Marshall	6 ft 6 in (1.98 m)	212 lb (96 kg)	Jr	Eisenhower HS	Rialto, California
G	25	Ted Dunlap	6 ft 3 in (1.91 m)	195 lb (88 kg)	Sr	Jesuit College Preparatory School of Dallas	Dallas, Texas
F	32	John Oates	6 ft 10 in (2.08 m)	255 lb (116 kg)	So	Don Bosco Prep	Harriman, New York
F	33	Evan Neisler	6 ft 7 in (2.01 m)	205 lb (93 kg)	Fr	Word of God Academy	Raleigh, North Carolina
C	44	Tyrelle Blair	6 ft 11 in (2.11 m)	230 lb (104 kg)	Jr	Florida State University School	Monticello, Florida
F/C	51	Sean Williams	6 ft 10 in (2.08 m)	230 lb (104 kg)	So	Mansfield HS	Houston, Texas

Head coach

- Al Skinner

Assistant coach(es)

Legend

- (C) Team captain
- (S) Suspended
- (I) Ineligible
- (W) Walk-on
- Injured
- Current redshirt

Roster

== Schedule and results ==
Date time, TV	Rank^{#}	Opponent^{#}	Result	Record	Site city, state
Exhibition
Nov 13, 2005*; 7:00 p.m.		Saint Michael's (VT)	W 102–62		Conte Forum; Chestnut Hill, Massachusetts
Regular season
Nov 18, 2005*; 7:00 p.m.		Dartmouth	W 80–61	1–0	Conte Forum; Chestnut Hill, Massachusetts
Nov 20, 2005*; 2:00 p.m.		Shawnee State	W 70–51	2–0	Conte Forum; Chestnut Hill, Massachusetts
Nov 22, 2005*; 7:00 p.m.		Buffalo	W 92–63	3–0	Conte Forum; Chestnut Hill, Massachusetts
Nov 25, 2005*; 7:00 p.m.		vs. Drake; Las Vegas Holiday Invitational	W 87–84	4–0	Valley High School; Las Vegas, Nevada
Nov 26, 2005*; 10:30 a.m.		vs. Oklahoma State; Las Vegas Holiday Invitational	W 76–68	5–0	Valley High School; Las Vegas, Nevada
Dec 3, 2005*; 7:00 p.m.		Sacred Heart	W 77–66	6–0	Conte Forum; Chestnut Hill, Massachusetts
Dec 6, 2005*; 9:00 p.m.	No. 6	vs. No. 14 Michigan State; Jimmy V Classic	L 70–77	6–1	Madison Square Garden; New York, New York
Dec 11, 2005; 8:00 p.m.		at Maryland	L 71–73	6–2 (0–1)	Comcast Center; College Park, Maryland
Dec 18, 2005*; 3:30 p.m.		Texas Southern	W 80–53	7–2	Conte Forum; Chestnut Hill, Massachusetts
Dec 22, 2005*; 7:00 p.m.		Harvard	W 89–55	8–2	Conte Forum; Chestnut Hill, Massachusetts
Dec 27, 2005*; 7:00 p.m.		at Duquesne	W 81–69	9–2	UPMC Cooper Fieldhouse; Pittsburgh, Pennsylvania
Dec 31, 2005*; 1:00 p.m.		at Rhode Island	W 78–56	10–2	Ryan Center; Kingston, Rhode Island
Jan 3, 2006*; 7:00 p.m.	No. 11	UMass	W 91–62	11–2	Conte Forum; Chestnut Hill, Massachusetts
Jan 8, 2006; 5:30 p.m.		at Georgia Tech	L 58–60	11–3 (0–2)	Alexander Memorial Coliseum; Atlanta, Georgia
Jan 10, 2006; 9:00 p.m.	No. 15	No. 18 NC State	L 60–78	11–4 (0–3)	Conte Forum; Chestnut Hill, Massachusetts
Jan 14, 2006; 2:00 p.m.		at Florida State	W 90–87	12–4 (1–3)	Donald L. Tucker Center; Tallahassee, Florida
Jan 17, 2006*; 7:00 p.m.		at Holy Cross	W 63–53	13–4	Hart Center; Worcester, Massachusetts
Jan 21, 2006; 8:00 p.m.		at Miami (FL)	W 65–61	14–4 (2–3)	BankUnited Center; Coral Gables, Florida
Jan 25, 2006; 9:00 p.m.	No. 20	at North Carolina	W 81–74	15–4 (3–3)	Dean Smith Center; Chapel Hill, North Carolina
Jan 29, 2006; 5:30 p.m.		Georgia Tech	W 66–64	16–4 (4–3)	Conte Forum; Chestnut Hill, Massachusetts
Feb 1, 2006; 9:00 p.m., ESPN	No. 15	No. 2 Duke	L 81–83	16–5 (4–4)	Conte Forum (8,606); Chestnut Hill, Massachusetts
Feb 4, 2006; 7:00 p.m.		at Virginia Tech	W 74–73	17–5 (5–4)	Cassell Coliseum; Blacksburg, Virginia
Feb 8, 2006; 7:30 p.m.		at Wake Forest	W 72–66	18–5 (6–4)	LJVM Coliseum; Winston-Salem, North Carolina
Feb 11, 2006; 8:00 p.m.	No. 18	Clemson	W 67–61	19–5 (7–4)	Conte Forum; Chestnut Hill, Massachusetts
Feb 13, 2006*; 7:00 p.m.		at Stony Brook	W 59–47	20–5	Island Federal Credit Union Arena; Stony Brook, New York
Feb 16, 2006; 7:00 p.m.		Miami (FL)	W 65–54	21–5 (8–4)	Conte Forum; Chestnut Hill, Massachusetts
Feb 21, 2006; 7:00 p.m., RSN	No. 11	at Virginia	L 58–72	21–6 (8–5)	University Hall (7,959); Charlottesville, Virginia
Feb 25, 2006; 3:45 p.m.	No. 11	at No. 15 NC State	W 74–72 ^{2OT}	22–6 (9–5)	RBC Center; Raleigh, North Carolina
Feb 28, 2006; 7:00 p.m.		at Wake Forest	W 80–65	23–6 (10–5)	Conte Forum; Chestnut Hill, Massachusetts
Mar 4, 2006; 12:00 p.m.	No. 11	Virginia Tech	W 59–57	24–6 (11–5)	Silvio O. Conte Forum; Chestnut Hill, Massachusetts
ACC Tournament
Mar 10, 2006*; 9:30 p.m.	(3) No. 7	vs. (6) Maryland; Quarterfinals	W 80–66	25–6	Greensboro Coliseum; Greensboro, North Carolina
Mar 11, 2006*; 4:00 p.m.	(3) No. 7	at (2) No. 10 North Carolina; Semifinals	W 85–82	26–6	Greensboro Coliseum; Greensboro, North Carolina
Mar 12, 2006*; 1:00 p.m.	(3) No. 7	vs. (1) No. 1 Duke; Championship game	L 76–78	26–7	Greensboro Coliseum; Greensboro, North Carolina
NCAA Tournament
Mar 16, 2006*; 12:40 p.m.	(4 MW) No. 7	vs. (13 MW) Pacific; First round	W 88–76 ^{2OT}	27–7	Jon M. Huntsman Center; Salt Lake City, Utah
Mar 18, 2006*; 5:40 p.m.	(4 MW) No. 7	vs. (12 MW) Montana; Second Round	W 69–56	28–7	Jon M. Huntsman Center; Salt Lake City, Utah
Mar 24, 2006*; 7:10 p.m.	(4 MW) No. 7	vs. (1 MW) No. 3 Villanova; Midwest Regional semifinal – Sweet Sixteen	L 59–60 ^{OT}	28–8	Hubert H. Humphrey Metrodome; Minneapolis, Minnesota
*Non-conference game. ^{#}Rankings from AP Poll. (#) Tournament seedings in parentheses. MW=Midwest. All times are in Eastern Time.
