= 2005–06 Maryland Terrapins men's basketball team =

American college basketball season

2005–06 Maryland Terrapins men's basketball
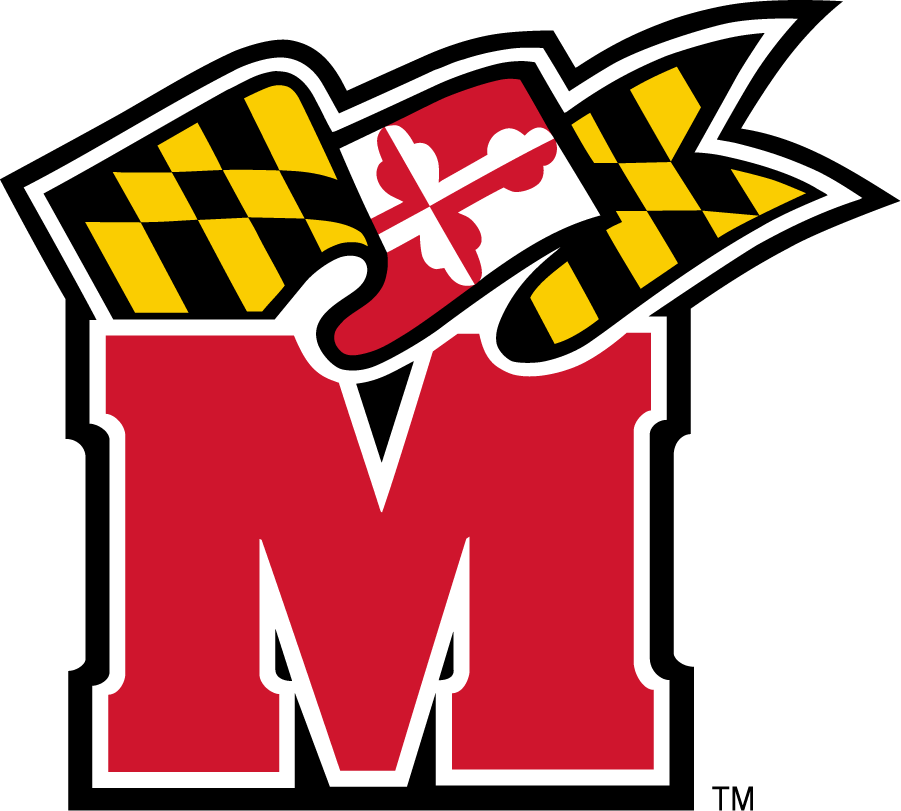

NIT, First Round
- Conference: Atlantic Coast Conference
- Record: 19–13 (8–8 ACC)
- Head coach: Gary Williams (17th season)
- Home arena: Comcast Center

2005–06 ACC men's basketball standings
	Conf.				Overall
Team	W		L	PCT	W		L	PCT
No. 1 Duke†	14	–	2	.875	32	–	4	.889
No. 10 North Carolina	12	–	4	.750	23	–	8	.742
No. 7 Boston College	11	–	5	.688	28	–	8	.778
NC State	10	–	6	.625	22	–	10	.688
Florida State	9	–	7	.563	20	–	10	.667
Maryland	8	–	8	.500	19	–	13	.594
Virginia	7	–	9	.438	15	–	15	.500
Miami (FL)	7	–	9	.438	18	–	16	.529
Clemson	7	–	9	.438	19	–	13	.594
Virginia Tech	4	–	12	.250	14	–	16	.467
Georgia Tech	4	–	12	.250	11	–	17	.393
Wake Forest	3	–	13	.188	17	–	17	.500
† 2006 ACC tournament winner Rankings from AP Poll

The 2005–06 Maryland Terrapins men's basketball team represented University of Maryland in the 2005–06 NCAA Division I men's basketball season. Led by head coach Gary Williams in his 17th season, the Terrapins would end the regular season sixth in the ACC standings, the Terrapins reached the quarterfinals of the ACC tournament before losing to Boston College. They were invited to the NIT where they lost to Manhattan in the first round to finish the season with a record of 19–13 (8–8 ACC).

== Schedule and results ==
Date time, TV	Rank^{#}	Opponent^{#}	Result	Record	Site city, state
Regular season
Nov 18, 2005*; 8:00 p.m., CSN Mid-Atlantic	No. 24	Fairleigh Dickinson	W 111–85	1–0	Comcast Center (17,950); College Park, Maryland
Nov 21, 2005*; 4:30 p.m., ESPN2	No. 23	vs. No. 8 Gonzaga; Maui Invitational	L 76–88	1–1	Lahaina Civic Center (2,400); Lahaina, Hawaii
Nov 22, 2005*; 1:30 p.m., ESPNU	No. 23	vs. Chaminade; Maui Invitational	W 98–69	2–1	Lahaina Civic Center (2,400); Lahaina, Hawaii
Nov 23, 2005*; 2:00 p.m., ESPN	No. 23	vs. Arkansas; Maui Invitational	W 75–62	3–1	Lahaina Civic Center (2,400); Lahaina, Hawaii
Nov 27, 2005*; 2:00 p.m., CSN Mid-Atlantic	No. 23	Nicholls State	W 88–56	4–1	Comcast Center (17,950); College Park, Maryland
Nov 30, 2005*; 7:30 p.m., ESPN2	No. 23	Minnesota; ACC–Big Ten Challenge	W 83–66	5–1	Comcast Center (17,950); College Park, Maryland
Dec 5, 2005*; 9:00 p.m., CSN Mid-Atlantic	No. 21	vs. No. 19 George Washington; BB&T Classic	L 70–78	5–2	MCI Center (11,712); Washington, D.C.
Dec 7, 2005*; 8:00 p.m.	No. 21	Western Carolina	W 87–57	6–2	Comcast Center (17,950); College Park, Maryland
Dec 11, 2005; 8:00 p.m., FSN	No. 21	No. 6 Boston College	W 73–71	7–2 (1–0)	Comcast Center (17,950); College Park, Maryland
Dec 23, 2005*; 8:00 p.m., CSN Mid-Atlantic	No. 16	American	W 81–55	8–2	Comcast Center (17,950); College Park, Maryland
Dec 28, 2005*; 8:00 p.m., Raycom	No. 16	Delaware State	W 68–54	9–2	Comcast Center (17,950); College Park, Maryland
Dec 31, 2005*; 2:00 p.m., CSN Mid-Atlantic	No. 16	VMI	W 99–68	10–2	Comcast Center (17,950); College Park, Maryland
Jan 4, 2006*; 8:00 p.m.	No. 14	Texas A&M–Corpus Christi	W 99–73	11–2	Comcast Center (17,950); College Park, Maryland
Jan 7, 2006; 12:00 p.m., Raycom	No. 14	at Miami	L 70–84	11–3 (1–1)	BankUnited Center (5,125); Coral Gables, Florida
Jan 11, 2006; 9:00 p.m., ESPN	No. 23	at No. 1 Duke	L 52–76	11–4 (1–2)	Cameron Indoor Stadium (9,314); Durham, North Carolina
Jan 15, 2006; 7:30 p.m., FSN	No. 23	Wake Forest	W 90–86	12–4 (2–2)	Comcast Center (17,950); College Park, Maryland
Jan 21, 2006; 8:00 p.m., Raycom	No. 22	Virginia Tech	W 81–72	13–4 (3–2)	Comcast Center (17,950); College Park, Maryland
Jan 25, 2006; 7:00 p.m., ESPN	No. 18	at Georgia Tech	W 86–74	14–4 (4–2)	Alexander Memorial Coliseum (9,191); Atlanta, Georgia
Jan 28, 2006*; 12:00 p.m., ESPN2	No. 18	at Temple	L 85–91	14–5	Liacouras Center (10,025); Philadelphia, Pennsylvania
Feb 2, 2006; 7:00 p.m., ESPN		North Carolina	L 62–77	14–6 (4–3)	Comcast Center (17,950); College Park, Maryland
Feb 5, 2006; 2:00 p.m., FSN		at No. 18 NC State	L 58–62	14–7 (4–4)	RBC Center (19,722); Raleigh, North Carolina
Feb 7, 2006*; 7:00 p.m., CSN Mid-Atlantic		Virginia	W 76–65	15–7 (5–4)	Comcast Center (17,950); College Park, Maryland
Feb 11, 2006; 1:00 p.m., CBS		No. 2 Duke	L 88–96	15–8 (5–5)	Comcast Center (17,950); College Park, Maryland
Feb 14, 2006; 8:00 p.m., Raycom		at Clemson	L 77–89	15–9 (5–6)	Littlejohn Coliseum (7,600); Clemson, South Carolina
Feb 18, 2006; 4:00 p.m., Raycom		Georgia Tech	W 87–84 ^{OT}	16–9 (6–6)	Comcast Center (17,950); College Park, Maryland
Feb 22, 2006; 9:00 p.m., Raycom		at Florida State	L 60–71	16–10 (6–7)	Donald L. Tucker Civic Center (8,751); Tallahassee, Florida
Feb 26, 2006; 5:30 p.m., FSN		at No. 21 North Carolina	L 57–81	16–11 (6–8)	Dean Smith Center (21,750); Chapel Hill, North Carolina
Mar 1, 2006; 9:00 p.m., Raycom		Miami	W 65–61	17–11 (7–8)	Comcast Center (17,950); College Park, Maryland
Mar 3, 2006; 3:30 p.m., FSN		at Virginia	W 71–70	18–11 (8–8)	University Hall (8,392); Charlottesville, Virginia
ACC Tournament
Mar 9, 2006; 9:30 p.m., Raycom	(6)	vs. (11) Georgia Tech; First round	W 82–64	19–11	Greensboro Coliseum (23,745); Greensboro, North Carolina
Mar 10, 2006; 9:00 p.m., ESPN2	(6)	vs. (3) No. 11 Boston College; Quarterfinals	L 66–80	19–12	Greensboro Coliseum (23,745); Greensboro, North Carolina
NIT
Mar 18, 2006*; 11:00 a.m.	(1)	(9) Manhattan; First round	L 84–87	19–13	Comcast Center (4,761); College Park, Maryland
*Non-conference game. ^{#}Rankings from AP Poll. (#) Tournament seedings in parentheses. All times are in Eastern Time.
