= Clemson Tigers men's basketball, 2000–2009 =

The Clemson Tigers men's basketball teams of 2000–2009 represented Clemson University in NCAA college basketball competition.

== 1999–2000 ==
1999–2000 Clemson Tigers men's basketball
- Conference: Atlantic Coast Conference
- Record: 10–20 (4–12 ACC)
- Head coach: Larry Shyatt
- Home arena: Littlejohn Coliseum

1999–2000 ACC men's basketball standings
	Conf.				Overall
Team	W		L	PCT	W		L	PCT
No. 1 Duke †	15	–	1	.938	29	–	5	.853
No. 17 Maryland	11	–	5	.688	25	–	10	.714
Virginia	9	–	7	.563	19	–	12	.613
North Carolina	9	–	7	.563	22	–	14	.611
Wake Forest	7	–	9	.438	22	–	14	.611
NC State	6	–	10	.375	20	–	14	.588
Florida State	5	–	11	.313	13	–	17	.433
Georgia Tech	5	–	11	.313	13	–	17	.433
Clemson	4	–	12	.250	10	–	20	.333
† 2000 ACC tournament winner Rankings from AP Poll

Date	Opponent	Rank^{#}	Site	Result
November 19*	East Tennessee St.		Littlejohn Coliseum • Clemson, SC	W 77–47
November 21*	Wofford		Littlejohn Coliseum • Clemson, SC	L 74–79
November 26*	vs. Central Florida		Bi-Lo Center • Greenville, SC (SoCon Holiday Hoops Quarterfinal)	W 54–48
November 27*	vs. Wisconsin–Green Bay		Bi-Lo Center • Greenville, SC (SoCon Holiday Hoops Semifinal)	L 47–64
November 28*	vs. Oregon State		Bi-Lo Center • Greenville, SC (SoCon Holiday Hoops Consolation)	L 35–53
December 1*	at Penn State		Bryce Jordan Center • University Park, PA (ACC–Big Ten Challenge)	L 75–85
December 4*	Charleston Southern		Littlejohn Coliseum • Clemson, SC	W 69–51
December 11*	South Carolina State		Littlejohn Coliseum • Clemson, SC	L 68–71
December 16*	South Carolina		Littlejohn Coliseum • Clemson, SC	W 61–58
December 18*	Winthrop		Littlejohn Coliseum • Clemson, SC	W 64–59
December 22*	George Washington		Littlejohn Coliseum • Clemson, SC	L 71–90
December 29*	at Furman		Bi-Lo Center • Greenville, SC	W 74–70
January 6	at #14 North Carolina		Dean Smith Center • Chapel Hill, NC	L 45–65
January 9	Wake Forest		Littlejohn Coliseum • Clemson, SC	L 53–67
January 12	at Florida State		Tallahassee-Leon County Civic Center • Tallahassee, FL	L 57–60
January 15	Virginia		Littlejohn Coliseum • Clemson, SC	L 91–98
January 22	at #24 Maryland		Cole Field House • College Park, MD	L 62–74
January 27	#21 NC State		Littlejohn Coliseum • Clemson, SC	W 59–42
January 29	at #3 Duke		Cameron Indoor Stadium • Durham, NC	L 59–93
February 2	Georgia Tech		Littlejohn Coliseum • Clemson, SC	W 70–58
February 6	North Carolina		Littlejohn Coliseum • Clemson, SC	L 60–73
February 8	at Wake Forest		LJVM Coliseum • Winston-Salem, NC	L 63–79
February 12	Florida State		Littlejohn Coliseum • Clemson, SC	W 84–58
February 15	at Virginia		University Hall • Charlottesville, VA	L 62–76
February 22	#19 Maryland		Littlejohn Coliseum • Clemson, SC	L 63–76
February 27	at NC State		RBC Center • Raleigh, NC	W 66–63
March 1	#4 Duke		Littlejohn Coliseum • Clemson, SC	L 78–92
March 4	at Georgia Tech		Alexander Memorial Coliseum • Atlanta, GA	L 69–85
March 9*	vs. #2 Duke		Charlotte Coliseum • Charlotte, NC (ACC Tournament first round)	L 63–94
*Non-Conference Game. #Rankings from AP Poll released prior to game.

== 2000–01 ==
2000–01 Clemson Tigers men's basketball
- Conference: Atlantic Coast Conference
- Record: 12–19 (2–14 ACC)
- Head coach: Larry Shyatt
- Home arena: Littlejohn Coliseum

2000–01 ACC men's basketball standings
	Conf.				Overall
Team	W		L	PCT	W		L	PCT
No. 6 North Carolina	13	–	3	.813	26	–	7	.788
No. 1 Duke †	13	–	3	.813	35	–	4	.897
No. 11 Maryland	10	–	6	.625	25	–	11	.694
No. 16 Virginia	9	–	7	.563	20	–	9	.690
Georgia Tech	8	–	8	.500	17	–	13	.567
No. 23 Wake Forest	8	–	8	.500	19	–	11	.633
NC State	5	–	11	.313	13	–	16	.448
Florida State	4	–	12	.250	9	–	21	.300
Clemson	2	–	14	.125	12	–	19	.387
† 2001 ACC tournament winner Rankings from AP Poll

Date	Opponent	Rank^{#}	Site	Result
November 17*	Hartford		Littlejohn Coliseum • Clemson, SC	W 86–67
November 21*	#10 Seton Hall		Littlejohn Coliseum • Clemson, SC	L 78–79
November 25*	The Citadel		Littlejohn Coliseum • Clemson, SC	W 84–76
November 28*	Northwestern		Littlejohn Coliseum • Clemson, SC (ACC–Big Ten Challenge)	W 57–44
December 2*	Western Carolina		Littlejohn Coliseum • Clemson, SC	W 87–52
December 5*	Winthrop		Littlejohn Coliseum • Clemson, SC	W 69–59
December 9*	South Carolina		Carolina Coliseum • Columbia, SC	L 64–76
December 16*	Wofford		Littlejohn Coliseum • Clemson, SC	W 78–74
December 20*	vs. Florida Atlantic		Mario Morales Coliseum • Guaynabo, PR (San Juan Shootout Quarterfinal)	W 94–81
December 21*	vs. #20 Cincinnati		Mario Morales Coliseum • Guaynabo, PR (San Juan Shootout Semifinal)	L 80–88
December 22*	vs. Washington		Mario Morales Coliseum • Guaynabo, PR (San Juan Shootout Consolation)	L 76–77 (OT)
December 28*	Charleston Southern		Littlejohn Coliseum • Clemson, SC	W 87–77
December 30*	at Coastal Carolina		Kimbel Arena • Conway, SC	W 81–68
January 2	#17 Maryland		Littlejohn Coliseum • Clemson, SC	L 92–104
January 7	at #3 Duke		Cameron Indoor Stadium • Durham, NC	L 74–115
January 13	NC State		Littlejohn Coliseum • Clemson, SC	W 72–69
January 17	at #6 North Carolina		Dean Smith Center • Chapel Hill, NC	L 65–92
January 21	at #10 Wake Forest		LJVM Coliseum • Winston-Salem, NC	L 63–71
January 24	Georgia Tech		Littlejohn Coliseum • Clemson, SC	L 108–111
January 27	#13 Virginia		Littlejohn Coliseum • Clemson, SC	L 76–104
January 31	at Florida State		Tallahassee-Leon County Civic Center • Tallahassee, FL	L 84–88 (OT)
February 4	at #9 Maryland		Cole Field House • College Park, MD	L 54–69
February 7	#3 Duke		Littlejohn Coliseum • Clemson, SC	L 64–81
February 14	at NC State		RBC Center • Raleigh, NC	L 51–85
February 18	#1 North Carolina		Littlejohn Coliseum • Clemson, SC	W 75–65
February 21	#24 Wake Forest		Littlejohn Coliseum • Clemson, SC	L 60–92
February 25	at Georgia Tech		Alexander Memorial Coliseum • Atlanta, GA	L 64–85
February 28	at #7 Virginia		University Hall • Charlottesville, VA	L 65–84
March 3	Florida State		Littlejohn Coliseum • Clemson, SC	L 63–75
March 8*	vs. Florida State		Georgia Dome • Atlanta, GA (ACC Tournament first round)	W 66–64
March 9*	vs. #6 North Carolina		Georgia Dome • Atlanta, GA (ACC Tournament Quarterfinal)	L 81–99
*Non-Conference Game. #Rankings from AP Poll released prior to game.

== 2001–02 ==
2001–02 Clemson Tigers men's basketball
- Conference: Atlantic Coast Conference
- Record: 13–17 (4–12 ACC)
- Head coach: Larry Shyatt
- Home arena: Littlejohn Coliseum

2001–02 ACC men's basketball standings
	Conf.				Overall
Team	W		L	PCT	W		L	PCT
No. 4 Maryland	15	–	1	.938	32	–	4	.889
No. 1 Duke†	13	–	3	.813	31	–	4	.886
Wake Forest	9	–	7	.563	21	–	13	.618
NC State	9	–	7	.563	23	–	11	.676
Virginia	7	–	9	.438	17	–	12	.586
Georgia Tech	7	–	9	.438	15	–	16	.484
North Carolina	4	–	12	.250	8	–	20	.286
Florida State	4	–	12	.250	12	–	17	.414
Clemson	4	–	12	.250	13	–	17	.433
† 2002 ACC tournament winner Rankings from AP Poll

Date	Opponent	Rank^{#}	Site	Result
November 17*	vs. Morris Brown		Sports and Fitness Center • Saint Thomas, VI (Paradise Jam Quarterfinal)	W 70–57
November 19*	vs. La Salle		Sports and Fitness Center • Saint Thomas, VI (Paradise Jam Semifinal)	W 81–69
November 20*	vs. Miami (FL)		Sports and Fitness Center • Saint Thomas, VI (Paradise Jam Final)	L 65–67
November 24*	Wofford		Littlejohn Coliseum • Clemson, SC	W 85–82
November 28*	at Penn State		Bryce Jordan Center • University Park, PA (ACC–Big Ten Challenge)	W 79–66
November 30*	Coastal Carolina		Littlejohn Coliseum • Clemson, SC	W 83–54
December 2	at #1 Duke		Cameron Indoor Stadium • Durham, NC	L 80–96
December 5*	Appalachian State		Littlejohn Coliseum • Clemson, SC	W 76–66
December 8*	South Carolina		Littlejohn Coliseum • Clemson, SC	L 59–81
December 15*	Elon		Littlejohn Coliseum • Clemson, SC	W 88–78
December 18*	Winthrop		Littlejohn Coliseum • Clemson, SC	L 61–66
December 22*	Charleston Southern		Littlejohn Coliseum • Clemson, SC	W 82–45
December 28*	at Hartford		Mohegan Sun Arena • Uncasville, CT	W 78–48
January 2*	Yale		Littlejohn Coliseum • Clemson, SC	L 65–68
January 5	at Georgia Tech		Alexander Memorial Coliseum • Atlanta, GA	W 83–76
January 8	#7 Virginia		Littlejohn Coliseum • Clemson, SC	W 68–52
January 12	at #19 Wake Forest		LJVM Coliseum • Winston-Salem, NC	L 55–96
January 15	NC State		Littlejohn Coliseum • Clemson, SC	L 79–80
January 20	at #3 Maryland		Cole Field House • College Park, MD	L 90–99
January 24	at Florida State		Tallahassee-Leon County Civic Center • Tallahassee, FL	L 63–68
January 27	North Carolina		Littlejohn Coliseum • Clemson, SC	L 69–87
February 2	#1 Duke		Littlejohn Coliseum • Clemson, SC	L 88–98
February 6	Georgia Tech		Littlejohn Coliseum • Clemson, SC	L 50–74
February 10	at #10 Virginia		University Hall • Charlottesville, VA	L 71–85
February 13	#19 Wake Forest		Littlejohn Coliseum • Clemson, SC	W 118–115 (2OT)
February 16	at #24 NC State		RBC Center • Raleigh, NC	L 54–83
February 20	Maryland		Littlejohn Coliseum • Clemson, SC	L 68–84
February 23	Florida State		Littlejohn Coliseum • Clemson, SC	W 87–78
February 27	at North Carolina		Dean Smith Center • Chapel Hill, NC	L 78–96
March 3*	vs. Florida State		Charlotte Coliseum • Charlotte, NC (ACC Tournament first round)	L 84–91 (OT)
*Non-Conference Game. #Rankings from AP Poll released prior to game.

== 2002–03 ==
2002–03 Clemson Tigers men's basketball
- Conference: Atlantic Coast Conference
- Record: 15–13 (5–11 ACC)
- Head coach: Larry Shyatt
- Home arena: Civic Center of Anderson; Littlejohn Coliseum

2002–03 ACC men's basketball standings
	Conf.				Overall
Team	W		L	PCT	W		L	PCT
No. 8 Wake Forest	13	–	3	.813	25	–	6	.806
No. 17 Maryland	11	–	5	.688	21	–	10	.677
No. 7 Duke†	11	–	5	.688	26	–	7	.788
NC State	9	–	7	.563	18	–	13	.581
Georgia Tech	7	–	9	.438	16	–	15	.516
Virginia	6	–	10	.375	16	–	16	.500
North Carolina	6	–	10	.375	19	–	16	.543
Clemson	5	–	11	.313	15	–	13	.536
Florida State	4	–	12	.250	14	–	15	.483
† 2003 ACC tournament winner Rankings from AP Poll

The Tigers played their first 8 home games at the Civic Center of Anderson in nearby Anderson, South Carolina, during renovations to Littlejohn Coliseum.

Date	Opponent	Rank^{#}	Site	Result
November 24*	Wofford		Civic Center of Anderson • Anderson, SC	W 79–72
November 27*	vs. High Point		Greensboro Coliseum • Greensboro, NC	W 91–65
December 3*	Penn State		Civic Center of Anderson • Anderson, SC (ACC–Big Ten Challenge)	W 79–70
December 7*	Maine		Civic Center of Anderson • Anderson, SC	W 73–61
December 14*	Gardner–Webb		Civic Center of Anderson • Anderson, SC	W 71–61
December 19*	Winthrop		Civic Center of Anderson • Anderson, SC	W 78–61
December 22*	Cincinnati		Civic Center of Anderson • Anderson, SC	W 58–51
December 28*	Liberty		Civic Center of Anderson • Anderson, SC	W 78–65
December 31*	Coastal Carolina		Civic Center of Anderson • Anderson, SC	W 90–63
January 5	#3 Duke		Littlejohn Coliseum • Clemson, SC	L 71–89
January 11*	Morris Brown		Littlejohn Coliseum • Clemson, SC	W 75–52
January 14	at North Carolina		Dean Smith Center • Chapel Hill, NC	L 66–68
January 18	Virginia		Littlejohn Coliseum • Clemson, SC	W 78–77
January 21	at Florida State		Tallahassee-Leon County Civic Center • Tallahassee, FL	L 59–60
January 25	#12 Maryland		Littlejohn Coliseum • Clemson, SC	L 47–52
January 28	#17 Wake Forest		Littlejohn Coliseum • Clemson, SC	L 60–81
February 2	at NC State		RBC Center • Raleigh, NC	L 56–78
February 5	Georgia Tech		Littlejohn Coliseum • Clemson, SC	W 69–67
February 9	at #9 Duke		Cameron Indoor Stadium • Durham, NC	L 55–65
February 12*	at South Carolina		Carolina Center • Columbia, SC	L 59–76
February 15	North Carolina		Littlejohn Coliseum • Clemson, SC	W 80–77
February 18	at Virginia		University Hall • Charlottesville, VA	W 73–64
February 22	Florida State		Littlejohn Coliseum • Clemson, SC	W 74–60
February 25	at #14 Maryland		Comcast Center • College Park, MD	L 52–91
March 1	at #12 Wake Forest		LJVM Coliseum • Winston-Salem, NC	L 68–80
March 5	NC State		Littlejohn Coliseum • Clemson, SC	L 60–63
March 8	at Georgia Tech		Alexander Memorial Coliseum • Atlanta, GA	L 56–66
March 13*	vs. Florida State		Greensboro Coliseum • Greensboro, NC (ACC Tournament first round)	L 61–72
*Non-Conference Game. #Rankings from AP Poll released prior to game.

== 2003–04 ==
2003–04 Clemson Tigers men's basketball
- Conference: Atlantic Coast Conference
- Record: 10–18 (3–13 ACC)
- Head coach: Oliver Purnell
- Home arena: Littlejohn Coliseum

2003–04 ACC men's basketball standings
	Conf.				Overall
Team	W		L	PCT	W		L	PCT
No. 6 Duke	13	–	3	.813	31	–	6	.838
No. 15 NC State	11	–	5	.688	21	–	10	.677
No. 17 Wake Forest	9	–	7	.563	21	–	10	.677
No. 14 Georgia Tech	9	–	7	.563	28	–	10	.737
No. 18 North Carolina	8	–	8	.500	19	–	11	.633
No. 19 Maryland†	7	–	9	.438	20	–	12	.625
Florida State	6	–	10	.375	19	–	14	.576
Virginia	6	–	10	.375	18	–	13	.581
Clemson	3	–	13	.188	10	–	18	.357
† 2004 ACC tournament winner Rankings from AP Poll

Date	Opponent	Rank^{#}	Site	Result
November 21*	Gardner–Webb		Littlejohn Coliseum • Clemson, SC	W 86–55
November 24*	High Point		Littlejohn Coliseum • Clemson, SC	W 88–81
November 29*	Wofford		Littlejohn Coliseum • Clemson, SC	W 84–77
December 3*	at #20 Purdue		Mackey Arena • West Lafayette, IN (ACC–Big Ten Challenge)	L 64–76
December 6*	South Carolina		Littlejohn Coliseum • Clemson, SC	L 61–76
December 13*	vs. Georgia		Philips Arena • Atlanta, GA (Chick-fil-A Peach Bowl Classic)	L 56–61
December 15*	East Tennessee St.		Littlejohn Coliseum • Clemson, SC	W 100–86 (OT)
December 17*	at #16 Cincinnati		Myrl H. Shoemaker Center • Cincinnati, OH	L 56–79
December 20*	South Carolina State		Littlejohn Coliseum • Clemson, SC	W 77–74
December 22*	Radford		Littlejohn Coliseum • Clemson, SC	W 74–58
December 30*	Boston College		Littlejohn Coliseum • Clemson, SC	W 72–62
January 3	#2 Duke		Littlejohn Coliseum • Clemson, SC	L 54–73
January 10	at #5 Wake Forest		LJVM Coliseum • Winston-Salem, NC	L 63–78
January 13	Florida State		Littlejohn Coliseum • Clemson, SC	W 53–48
January 17	at NC State		RBC Center • Raleigh, NC	L 69–86
January 20	at Virginia		University Hall • Charlottesville, VA	L 50–61
January 25	Maryland		Littlejohn Coliseum • Clemson, SC	L 52–65
January 27	at #14 Georgia Tech		Alexander Memorial Coliseum • Atlanta, GA	L 69–76
January 31	#12 North Carolina		Littlejohn Coliseum • Clemson, SC	W 81–72
February 8	at #1 Duke		Cameron Indoor Stadium • Durham, NC	L 55–81
February 12	#20 Wake Forest		Littlejohn Coliseum • Clemson, SC	L 67–82
February 14	at Florida State		Tallahassee-Leon County Civic Center • Tallahassee, FL	L 52–65
February 18	#15 NC State		Littlejohn Coliseum • Clemson, SC	W 60–55
February 21	Virginia		Littlejohn Coliseum • Clemson, SC	L 55–58
February 24	at Maryland		Comcast Center • College Park, MD	L 49–70
February 28	#18 Georgia Tech		Littlejohn Coliseum • Clemson, SC	L 60–79
March 2	at #14 North Carolina		Dean Smith Center • Chapel Hill, NC	L 53–69
March 11*	vs. Virginia		Greensboro Coliseum • Greensboro, NC (ACC Tournament first round)	L 79–83 (OT)
*Non-Conference Game. #Rankings from AP Poll released prior to game.

== 2004–05 ==
2004–05 Clemson Tigers men's basketball

NIT, First Round
- Conference: Atlantic Coast Conference
- Record: 16–16 (5–11 ACC)
- Head coach: Oliver Purnell
- Home arena: Littlejohn Coliseum

2004–05 ACC men's basketball standings
	Conf.				Overall
Team	W		L	PCT	W		L	PCT
No. 2 North Carolina	14	–	2	.875	33	–	4	.892
No. 5 Wake Forest	13	–	3	.813	27	–	6	.818
No. 3 Duke†	11	–	5	.688	27	–	6	.818
Virginia Tech	8	–	8	.500	16	–	14	.533
No. 25 Georgia Tech	8	–	8	.500	20	–	12	.625
Miami (FL)	7	–	9	.438	16	–	13	.552
NC State	7	–	9	.438	21	–	14	.600
Maryland	7	–	9	.438	19	–	13	.594
Clemson	5	–	11	.313	16	–	16	.500
Florida State	4	–	12	.250	14	–	15	.483
Virginia	4	–	12	.250	14	–	15	.483
† 2005 ACC tournament winner Rankings from AP Poll

Date	Opponent	Rank^{#}	Site	Result
November 19*	Hampton		Littlejohn Coliseum • Clemson, SC	W 98–54
November 23*	UNC–Asheville		Littlejohn Coliseum • Clemson, SC	W 78–59
November 26*	at Boston College		Conte Forum • Chestnut Hill, MA	L 70–79
December 1*	Ohio State		Littlejohn Coliseum • Clemson, SC (ACC–Big Ten Challenge)	W 80–73
December 4*	at South Carolina		Colonial Center • Columbia, SC	W 63–62 (OT)
December 11*	Charleston Southern		Littlejohn Coliseum • Clemson, SC	W 73–55
December 14*	Norfolk State		Littlejohn Coliseum • Clemson, SC	W 83–56
December 17*	The Citadel		Littlejohn Coliseum • Clemson, SC	W 76–52
December 21*	vs. UAB		Stan Sheriff Center • Honolulu, HI (Rainbow Classic Quarterfinal)	L 66–78
December 22*	vs. Indiana State		Stan Sheriff Center • Honolulu, HI (Rainbow Classic Consolation)	W 83–57
December 23*	vs. Georgetown		Stan Sheriff Center • Honolulu, HI (Rainbow Classic Consolation)	L 60–75
December 29*	East Carolina		Littlejohn Coliseum • Clemson, SC	W 74–40
January 2	#6 Duke		Littlejohn Coliseum • Clemson, SC	L 54–62
January 8	#4 Wake Forest		Littlejohn Coliseum • Clemson, SC	L 68–103
January 12	at Florida State		Donald L. Tucker Center • Tallahassee, FL	W 56–54
January 15	at Virginia Tech		Cassell Coliseum • Blacksburg, VA	L 57–59
January 19	#6 North Carolina		Littlejohn Coliseum • Clemson, SC	L 58–77
January 22	at Virginia		University Hall • Charlottesville, VA	L 79–81
January 26	at Miami (FL)		BankUnited Center • Coral Gables, FL	L 77–83
January 29	NC State		Littlejohn Coliseum • Clemson, SC	L 70–80
February 1	#22 Maryland		Littlejohn Coliseum • Clemson, SC	W 88–73
February 8	Georgia Tech		Littlejohn Coliseum • Clemson, SC	L 62–70
February 12	Miami (FL)		Littlejohn Coliseum • Clemson, SC	L 77–83
February 16	vs. Georgia		Bi-Lo Center • Greenville, SC	W 59–42
February 19	at #4 North Carolina		Dean Smith Center • Chapel Hill, NC	L 56–88
February 22	at Maryland		Comcast Center • College Park, MD	W 97–93
February 27	Florida State		Littlejohn Coliseum • Clemson, SC	W 83–74
March 1	Virginia Tech		Littlejohn Coliseum • Clemson, SC	W 66–64
March 5	at Georgia Tech		Alexander Memorial Coliseum • Atlanta, GA	L 56–64
March 10*	vs. Maryland		MCI Center • Washington, D.C. (ACC Tournament first round)	W 84–72
March 11*	vs. #2 North Carolina		MCI Center • Washington, D.C. (ACC Tournament Quarterfinal)	L 81–88
March 16*	at Texas A&M		Reed Arena • College Station, TX (NIT First Round)	L 74–82
*Non-Conference Game. #Rankings from AP Poll released prior to game.

== 2005–06 ==
2005–06 Clemson Tigers men's basketball

San Juan Shootout champions

NIT, First Round
- Conference: Atlantic Coast Conference
- Record: 19–13 (7–9 ACC)
- Head coach: Oliver Purnell
- Home arena: Littlejohn Coliseum

2005–06 ACC men's basketball standings
	Conf.				Overall
Team	W		L	PCT	W		L	PCT
No. 1 Duke†	14	–	2	.875	32	–	4	.889
No. 10 North Carolina	12	–	4	.750	23	–	8	.742
No. 7 Boston College	11	–	5	.688	28	–	8	.778
NC State	10	–	6	.625	22	–	10	.688
Florida State	9	–	7	.563	20	–	10	.667
Maryland	8	–	8	.500	19	–	13	.594
Virginia	7	–	9	.438	15	–	15	.500
Miami (FL)	7	–	9	.438	18	–	16	.529
Clemson	7	–	9	.438	19	–	13	.594
Virginia Tech	4	–	12	.250	14	–	16	.467
Georgia Tech	4	–	12	.250	11	–	17	.393
Wake Forest	3	–	13	.188	17	–	17	.500
† 2006 ACC tournament winner Rankings from AP Poll

Date	Opponent	Rank^{#}	Site	Result
November 18*	Bethune-Cookman		Littlejohn Coliseum • Clemson, SC	W 84–55
November 21*	Coppin State		Littlejohn Coliseum • Clemson, SC	W 102–71
November 23*	South Carolina State		Littlejohn Coliseum • Clemson, SC	W 79–38
November 26*	Charleston Southern		Littlejohn Coliseum • Clemson, SC	W 68–56
November 29*	at Penn State		Bryce Jordan Center • University Park, PA (ACC–Big Ten Challenge)	W 96–88
December 3*	South Carolina		Littlejohn Coliseum • Clemson, SC	W 82–63
December 6*	Wofford		Littlejohn Coliseum • Clemson, SC	W 62–60
December 9*	East Tennessee St.		Littlejohn Coliseum • Clemson, SC	W 80–72
December 19*	vs. Puerto Rico–Mayagüez		Mario Morales Coliseum • Guaynabo, PR (San Juan Shootout Quarterfinal)	W 101–60
December 20*	vs. Holy Cross		Mario Morales Coliseum • Guaynabo, PR (San Juan Shootout Semifinal)	W 71–48
December 21*	vs. Akron		Mario Morales Coliseum • Guaynabo, PR (San Juan Shootout Final)	W 66–59
December 28*	at Georgia		Stegeman Coliseum • Athens, GA	L 69–72
December 30*	Elon		Littlejohn Coliseum • Clemson, SC	L 69–74
January 4	Florida State		Littlejohn Coliseum • Clemson, SC	W 61–55
January 7	at Virginia		University Hall • Charlottesville, VA	L 58–64
January 11	Wake Forest		Littlejohn Coliseum • Clemson, SC	W 74–73 (OT)
January 14	#1 Duke		Littlejohn Coliseum • Clemson, SC	L 77–87
January 18	at Miami (FL)		BankUnited Center • Coral Gables, FL	L 38–62
January 21	at Georgia Tech		Alexander Memorial Coliseum • Atlanta, GA	W 73–63
January 29	#14 NC State		Littlejohn Coliseum • Clemson, SC	L 85–94 (2OT)
February 1	at Florida State		Donald L. Tucker Center • Tallahassee, FL	L 59–69
February 4	at North Carolina		Dean Smith Center • Chapel Hill, NC	L 61–76
February 8	Virginia Tech		Littlejohn Coliseum • Clemson, SC	L 74–75 (OT)
February 11	at #18 Boston College		Conte Forum • Chestnut Hill, MA	L 61–67
February 14	Maryland		Littlejohn Coliseum • Clemson, SC	W 89–77
February 22	at Wake Forest		LJVM Coliseum • Winston-Salem, NC	L 68–74 (OT)
February 25	Virginia		Littlejohn Coliseum • Clemson, SC	W 90–64
March 1	at Virginia Tech		Cassell Coliseum • Blacksburg, VA	W 86–81
March 4	Georgia Tech		Littlejohn Coliseum • Clemson, SC	W 95–82
March 9*	vs. Miami (FL)		Greensboro Coliseum • Greensboro, NC (ACC Tournament first round)	L 63–66
March 15*	Louisiana Tech		Littlejohn Coliseum • Clemson, SC (NIT First Round)	W 69–53
March 20*	at Louisville		Freedom Hall • Louisville, KY (NIT Second Round)	L 68–74
*Non-Conference Game. #Rankings from AP Poll released prior to game.

== 2006–07 ==
2006–07 Clemson Tigers men's basketball

Cox Classic champions

NIT, Runner-up
- Conference: Atlantic Coast Conference
- Record: 25–11 (7–9 ACC)
- Head coach: Oliver Purnell
- Home arena: Littlejohn Coliseum

2006–07 ACC men's basketball standings
	Conf.				Overall
Team	W		L	PCT	W		L	PCT
No. 4 North Carolina†	11	–	5	.688	31	–	7	.816
Virginia	11	–	5	.688	21	–	11	.656
Virginia Tech	10	–	6	.625	22	–	12	.647
Boston College	10	–	6	.625	21	–	12	.636
No. 18 Maryland	10	–	6	.625	25	–	9	.735
Georgia Tech	8	–	8	.500	20	–	12	.625
Duke	8	–	8	.500	22	–	11	.667
Clemson	7	–	9	.438	25	–	11	.694
Florida State	7	–	9	.438	22	–	13	.629
NC State	5	–	11	.313	20	–	16	.556
Wake Forest	5	–	11	.313	15	–	16	.484
Miami (FL)	4	–	12	.250	12	–	20	.375
† 2007 ACC tournament winner Rankings from AP Poll

Date	Opponent	Rank^{#}	Site	Result
October 31*	Lithuania Academy		Littlejohn Coliseum • Clemson, SC (Exhibition)	W 99–50
November 10*	vs. Arkansas State		Ted Constant Center • Norfolk, VA (Cox Classic)	W 83–44
November 11*	vs. Monmouth		Ted Constant Center • Norfolk, VA (Cox Classic)	W 77–65
November 12*	at Old Dominion		Ted Constant Center • Norfolk, VA (Cox Classic)	W 74–70
November 15*	Furman		Littlejohn Coliseum • Clemson, SC	W 67–58
November 17*	Appalachian State		Littlejohn Coliseum • Clemson, SC	W 79–49
November 24*	Charleston Southern		Littlejohn Coliseum • Clemson, SC	W 74–50
November 29*	at Minnesota		Williams Arena • Minneapolis, MN (ACC–Big Ten Challenge)	W 90–68
December 2*	at South Carolina		Colonial Life Arena • Columbia, SC	W 74–53
December 5*	Wofford		Littlejohn Coliseum • Clemson, SC	W 90–66
December 19*	Georgia Southern		Littlejohn Coliseum • Clemson, SC	W 72–60
December 23*	Western Carolina		Littlejohn Coliseum • Clemson, SC	W 103–60
December 28*	Georgia	#25	Littlejohn Coliseum • Clemson, SC	W 75–60
December 31*	Georgia State		Littlejohn Coliseum • Clemson, SC	W 67–57
January 3	at Florida State		Donald L. Tucker Civic Center • Tallahassee, FL	W 68–66
January 6	Georgia Tech	#23	Littlejohn Coliseum • Clemson, SC	W 75–74
January 9	at NC State		RBC Center • Raleigh, NC	W 87–76
January 13	at Maryland	#17	Comcast Center • College Park, MD	L 87–92
January 17	#4 North Carolina	#19	Littlejohn Coliseum • Clemson, SC	L 55–77
January 20	Boston College		Littlejohn Coliseum • Clemson, SC	W 74–54
January 25	at #10 Duke	#19	Cameron Indoor Stadium • Durham, NC	L 66–68
January 28	Virginia	#19	Littlejohn Coliseum • Clemson, SC	L 63–64
February 3	at Georgia Tech		Alexander Memorial Coliseum • Atlanta, GA	L 62–80
February 7	Florida State		Littlejohn Coliseum • Clemson, SC	W 71–58
February 14	at Wake Forest		LJVM Coliseum • Winston-Salem, NC	L 65–67
February 18	Maryland		Littlejohn Coliseum • Clemson, SC	L 66–82
February 22	#18 Duke		Littlejohn Coliseum • Clemson, SC	L 66–71
February 24	at Boston College		Conte Forum • Chestnut Hill, MA	L 54–59
February 28	Miami (FL)		Littlejohn Coliseum • Clemson, SC	W 74–70
March 4	at Virginia Tech		Cassell Coliseum • Blacksburg, VA	W 75–74
March 8	vs. (9) Florida State	(8)	St. Pete Times Forum • Tampa, FL (ACC Tournament first round)	L 66–67
March 14*	(S8) East Tennessee State	(S1)	Littlejohn Coliseum • Clemson, SC (NIT First Round)	W 64–57
March 19*	(S4) Ole Miss	(S1)	Littlejohn Coliseum • Clemson, SC (NIT Second Round)	W 89–68
March 21*	(S2) Syracuse	(S1)	Littlejohn Coliseum • Clemson, SC (NIT Quarterfinals)	W 74–70
March 27*	vs. (W1) Air Force	(S1)	Madison Square Garden • New York, NY (NIT Semifinals)	W 68–67
March 29*	vs. (E1) West Virginia	(S1)	Madison Square Garden • New York, NY (NIT Championship)	L 73–78
*Non-Conference Game. #Rankings from AP Poll released prior to game.

== 2007–08 ==
2007–08 ACC men's basketball standings
	Conf.				Overall
Team	W		L	PCT	W		L	PCT
No. 1 North Carolina †	14	–	2	.875	36	–	3	.923
No. 9 Duke	13	–	3	.813	28	–	6	.824
No. 22 Clemson	10	–	6	.625	24	–	10	.706
Virginia Tech	9	–	7	.563	21	–	14	.600
Miami (FL)	8	–	8	.500	23	–	11	.676
Maryland	8	–	8	.500	19	–	15	.559
Georgia Tech	7	–	9	.438	15	–	17	.469
Wake Forest	7	–	9	.438	17	–	13	.567
Florida State	7	–	9	.438	19	–	15	.559
Virginia	5	–	11	.313	17	–	16	.515
Boston College	4	–	12	.250	14	–	17	.452
NC State	4	–	12	.250	15	–	16	.484
† 2008 ACC tournament winner Rankings from AP Poll

== 2008–09 ==
2008–09 ACC men's basketball standings
	Conf.				Overall
Team	W		L	PCT	W		L	PCT
No. 2 North Carolina	13	–	3	.813	34	–	4	.895
No. 6 Duke†	11	–	5	.688	30	–	7	.811
No. 12 Wake Forest	11	–	5	.688	24	–	7	.774
No. 16 Florida State	10	–	6	.625	25	–	10	.714
No. 24 Clemson	9	–	7	.563	23	–	9	.719
Boston College	9	–	7	.563	22	–	12	.647
Maryland	7	–	9	.438	21	–	14	.600
Virginia Tech	7	–	9	.438	19	–	15	.559
Miami (FL)	7	–	9	.438	19	–	13	.594
NC State	6	–	10	.375	16	–	14	.533
Virginia	4	–	12	.250	10	–	18	.357
Georgia Tech	2	–	14	.125	12	–	19	.387
† 2009 ACC tournament winner Rankings from AP Poll
