= 2005–06 Virginia Cavaliers men's basketball team =

American college basketball season

2005–06 Virginia Cavaliers men's basketball

NIT, First Round
- Conference: Atlantic Coast Conference
- Record: 15–15 (7–9 ACC)
- Head coach: Dave Leitao (1st season)
- Assistant coaches: Bill Courtney (1st season); Rob Lanier (1st season); Steve Seymour (1st season)
- Home arena: University Hall

2005–06 ACC men's basketball standings
	Conf.				Overall
Team	W		L	PCT	W		L	PCT
No. 1 Duke†	14	–	2	.875	32	–	4	.889
No. 10 North Carolina	12	–	4	.750	23	–	8	.742
No. 7 Boston College	11	–	5	.688	28	–	8	.778
NC State	10	–	6	.625	22	–	10	.688
Florida State	9	–	7	.563	20	–	10	.667
Maryland	8	–	8	.500	19	–	13	.594
Virginia	7	–	9	.438	15	–	15	.500
Miami (FL)	7	–	9	.438	18	–	16	.529
Clemson	7	–	9	.438	19	–	13	.594
Virginia Tech	4	–	12	.250	14	–	16	.467
Georgia Tech	4	–	12	.250	11	–	17	.393
Wake Forest	3	–	13	.188	17	–	17	.500
† 2006 ACC tournament winner Rankings from AP Poll

The 2005–06 Virginia Cavaliers men's basketball team represented the University of Virginia during the 2005–06 NCAA Division I men's basketball season. The team was led by first-year head coach Dave Leitao, and played their home games at University Hall in Charlottesville, Virginia as members of the Atlantic Coast Conference.

This was the final season Virginia played at University Hall, as the John Paul Jones Arena opened for the 2006–07 season.

== Last season ==
The Cavaliers had a record of 14–15, with a conference record of 4–12. At the end of the season, head coach Pete Gillen stepped down from the position. On April 16, DePaul head coach Dave Leitao was announced to take over at Virginia.

== Roster ==
2005–06 Virginia Cavaliers men's basketball team
Players
Coaches

Pos.	#	Name	Height	Weight	Year	Previous school	Hometown
G	2	J. R. Reynolds (C)	6 ft 2.5 in (1.89 m)	197 lb (89 kg)	Jr	Oak Hill Academy	Roanoke, Virginia
F	11	Laurynas Mikalauskas	6 ft 8 in (2.03 m)	241 lb (109 kg)	Fr	Blue Ridge School	Palanga, Lithuania
G	12	Billy Campbell	6 ft 0 in (1.83 m)	184 lb (83 kg)	Sr	Paideia School	Atlanta
G	15	T. J. Bannister	5 ft 10.5 in (1.79 m)	176 lb (80 kg)	Jr	Arlington Country Day	Jacksonville, Florida
C	21	Tunji Soroye	6 ft 11 in (2.11 m)	212 lb (96 kg)	So	Montrose Christian	Dugbe Ibadan, Nigeria
G/F	24	Mamadi Diane	6 ft 5 in (1.96 m)	185 lb (84 kg)	Fr	DeMatha Catholic	Potomac, Maryland
G	25	Matt Deasey	6 ft 0 in (1.83 m)	178 lb (81 kg)	Jr	Episcopal	Wynnewood, Pennsylvania
F	30	Adrian Joseph	6 ft 7 in (2.01 m)	195 lb (88 kg)	So	Brewster Academy	San Fernando, Trinidad
F	33	Jason Cain	6 ft 10 in (2.08 m)	212 lb (96 kg)	Jr	John Bartram	Philadelphia, Pennsylvania
F	35	Drew Shiembob	6 ft 4 in (1.93 m)	199 lb (90 kg)	Fr	St. Christopher's	Richmond, Virginia
F	42	Mike Forkin	6 ft 5 in (1.96 m)	187 lb (85 kg)	Jr	Westfield	Centerville, Virginia
G	44	Sean Singletary (C)	6 ft 0 in (1.83 m)	174 lb (79 kg)	So	William Penn Charter	Philadelphia, Pennsylvania
F/C	55	Donte Minter	6 ft 8 in (2.03 m)	250 lb (113 kg)	Jr	Fork Union Military	Salisbury, North Carolina

Head coach

- Dave Leitao (Northeastern)

Assistant coach(es)

- Rob Lanier (St. Bonaventure)
- Steve Seymour (Bridgewater)
- Bill Courtney (Bucknell)

Legend

- (C) Team captain
- (S) Suspended
- (I) Ineligible
- (W) Walk-on
- Injured
- Current redshirt

Roster
Last update: 13 December 2014

== Schedule ==
Date time, TV	Opponent	Result	Record	Site (attendance) city, state
Exhibition game
Nov. 11; 7:00 pm	Concordia	W 98–62		University Hall (1,848); Charlottesville, Virginia
Regular season
Nov. 18*; 7:00 pm	Liberty	W 79–44	1–0	University Hall (8,076); Charlottesville, Virginia
Nov. 22*; 8:00 pm	at Richmond	W 59–43	2–0	Robins Center (6,252); Richmond, Virginia
Nov. 27*; 7:00 pm, FSN	at No. 9 Arizona	L 51–81	2–1	McKale Center (14,570); Tucson, Arizona
Nov. 30*; 8:00 pm, ESPNU	Northwestern; ACC/Big Ten Challenge	W 72–57	3–1	University Hall (7,331); Charlottesville, Virginia
Dec. 4; 5:30 pm, FSN	at Georgia Tech	L 54–63	3–2 (0–1)	Alexander Memorial Coliseum (9,191); Atlanta
Dec. 7*; 7:00 pm	Fordham	L 60–62	3–3	University Hall (6,328); Charlottesville, Virginia
Dec. 17*; 8:00 pm, FSN NW	at No. 10 Gonzaga	L 69–80	3–4	McCarthey Athletic Center (6,000); Spokane, Washington
Dec. 23*; 7:00 pm	Loyola	W 98–59	4–4	University Hall (7,490); Charlottesville, Virginia
Dec. 28*; 7:00 pm	vs. UMBC	W 77–66	5–4	Siegel Center (2,637); Richmond, Virginia
Dec. 31*; 2:00 pm	Hartford	W 71–62	6–4	University Hall (7,652); Charlottesville, Virginia
Jan. 2*; 8:00 pm, CSN	at Western Kentucky	L 68–78	6–5	E. A. Diddle Arena (4,981); Bowling Green, Kentucky
Jan. 7 Noon, Raycom	Clemson	W 64–58	7–5 (1–1)	University Hall (8,279); Charlottesville, Virginia
Jan. 11; 7:00 pm	Florida State	L 82–87 ^{OT}	7–6 (1–2)	University Hall (7,556); Charlottesville, Virginia
Jan. 15; 4:00 pm, Raycom	at Virginia Tech	W 54–49	8–6 (2–2)	Cassell Coliseum (9,847); Blacksburg, Virginia
Jan. 19; 7:00 pm, ESPN	No. 24 North Carolina	W 72–68	9–6 (3–2)	University Hall (8,392); Charlottesville, Virginia
Jan. 24; 9:00 pm, ESPNU	Miami	W 71–51	10–6 (4–2)	University Hall (8,075); Charlottesville, Virginia
Jan. 28; 7:00 pm, ESPN	at No. 2 Duke	L 63–82	10–7 (4–3)	Cameron Indoor Stadium (9,314); Durham, North Carolina
Feb. 1; 7:00 pm, RSN	at NC State	L 64–66	10–8 (4–4)	PNC Arena (18,216); Raleigh, North Carolina
Feb. 4; 1:30 pm, Raycom	Wake Forest	W 75–73	11–8 (5–4)	University Hall (8,211); Charlottesville, Virginia
Feb. 7; 7:00 pm, RSN	at Maryland	L 65–76	11–9 (5–5)	Comcast Center (17,950); College Park, Maryland
Feb. 11; 8:00 pm, Raycom	Virginia Tech	W 81–77 ^{OT}	12–9 (6–5)	University Hall (7,757); Charlottesville, Virginia
Feb. 15*; 7:00 pm	Longwood	W 91–56	13–9	University Hall (7,652); Charlottesville, Virginia
Feb. 18; 4:00 pm, Raycom	at Florida State	L 62–76	13–10 (6–6)	Donald L. Tucker Center (8,567); Tallahassee, Florida
Feb. 21; 7:00 pm, RSN	at No. 11 Boston College	W 72–58	14–10 (7–6)	University Hall (7,959); Charlottesville, Virginia
Feb. 25; 2:00 pm	at Clemson	L 64–90	14–11 (7–7)	Littlejohn Coliseum (8,000); Clemson, South Carolina
Mar. 1; 9:00 pm, Raycom	No. 13 North Carolina	L 54–99	14–12 (7–8)	Dean Smith Center (21,750); Chapel Hill, North Carolina
Mar. 5; 3:30 pm, FSN	Maryland; Last Ball in U-Hall	L 70–71	14–13 (7–9)	University Hall (8,392); Charlottesville, Virginia
ACC Tournament
Mar. 9; 7:00 pm, ESPN	vs. Virginia Tech; ACC Tournament first round	W 60–56	15–13	Greensboro Coliseum (23,745); Greensboro, North Carolina
Mar. 10; 7:00 pm, Raycom/ESPN2	vs. North Carolina; ACC Tournament quarterfinals	L 67–79	15–14	Greensboro Coliseum (23,745); Greensboro, North Carolina
National Invitation Tournament
Mar. 14*; 9:30 pm	at Stanford; NIT Louisville Bracket	L 49–65	15–15	Maples Pavilion (2,519); Stanford, California
*Non-conference game. (#) Tournament seedings in parentheses. All times are in Eastern Time.
