= 2006 National Invitation Tournament =

Annual NCAA basketball competition

- Season: 2005–06
- Teams: 40
- Finals site: Madison Square Garden, New York City
- Champions: South Carolina Gamecocks (2nd title)
- Runner-up: Michigan Wolverines (3rd title game)
- Semifinalists: Louisville Cardinals (3rd semifinal); Old Dominion Monarchs (1st semifinal)
- Winning coach: Dave Odom (3rd title)
- MVP: Renaldo Balkman (South Carolina)

The 2006 National Invitation Tournament was the first time the tournament was planned and operated by the NCAA, taking over after 68 years under the auspices of the Metropolitan Intercollegiate Basketball Association (MIBA). The 2006 NIT also saw changes made to the selection process as well as being the first time the NIT seeded the participants. The South Carolina Gamecocks won their second straight NIT title.

== Selected teams ==
Below are lists of the team selected for the tournament. This was the first year selected teams were given bracket seeds.

Maryland Bracket
| Seed | School | Conference |
|---|---|---|
| #1 | Maryland | ACC |
| #2 | Saint Joseph's | A-10 |
| #3 | Hofstra | CAA |
| #4 | Colorado | Big 12 |
| #5 | Old Dominion | CAA |
| #6 | Nebraska | Big 12 |
| #7 | Penn State | Big Ten |
| #8 | Rutgers | Big East |
| #9 | Manhattan | MAAC |
| #10 | Fairleigh Dickinson | NEC |

Louisville Bracket
| Seed | School | Conference |
|---|---|---|
| #1 | Louisville | Big East |
| #2 | Missouri State | MVC |
| #3 | Houston | C-USA |
| #4 | Clemson | ACC |
| #5 | Louisiana Tech | WAC |
| #6 | BYU | MWC |
| #7 | Stanford | Pac-10 |
| #8 | Virginia | ACC |
| #9 | Northern Arizona | Big Sky |
| #10 | Delaware State | MEAC |

Michigan Bracket
| Seed | School | Conference |
|---|---|---|
| #1 | Michigan | Big Ten |
| #2 | Creighton | MVC |
| #3 | Miami (FL) | ACC |
| #4 | Vanderbilt | SEC |
| #5 | Notre Dame | Big East |
| #6 | Oklahoma State | Big 12 |
| #7 | Temple | A-10 |
| #8 | Akron | MAC |
| #9 | UTEP | C-USA |
| #10 | Lipscomb | A-Sun |

Cincinnati Bracket
| Seed | School | Conference |
|---|---|---|
| #1 | Cincinnati | Big East |
| #2 | Florida State | ACC |
| #3 | South Carolina | SEC |
| #4 | Minnesota | Big Ten |
| #5 | Wake Forest | ACC |
| #6 | Western Kentucky | Sun Belt |
| #7 | Miami (OH) | MAC |
| #8 | Butler | Horizon |
| #9 | Charlotte | A-10 |
| #10 | Georgia Southern | So-Con |

== Bracket ==
Below are the four brackets of the tournament, along with the bracket of the four-team championship round. Also the highest remaining seeds hosted the games.

=== Maryland Bracket ===
Opening Round
9 | Manhattan | 80
10 | Fairleigh Dickinson | 77
7 | Penn State | 71
8 | Rutgers | 76

First Round
1 | Maryland | 84
9 | Manhattan | 87
4 | Colorado | 61
5 | Old Dominion | 79
2 | Saint Joseph's | 71
8 | Rutgers | 62
3 | Hofstra | 73
6 | Nebraska | 62

Second Round
9 | Manhattan | 66
5 | Old Dominion | 70
2 | Saint Joseph's | 75
3 | Hofstra | 77

Quarterfinals
5 | Old Dominion | 61
3 | Hofstra | 51

=== Michigan Bracket ===
Opening Round
9 | UTEP | 85
10 | Lipscomb | 66
7 | Temple | 73
8 | Akron | 80

First Round
1 | Michigan | 82
9 | UTEP | 67
4 | Vanderbilt | 69
5 | Notre Dame | 79
2 | Creighton | 71
8 | Akron | 60
3 | Miami (FL) | 62
6 | Oklahoma State | 59

Second Round
1 | Michigan | 87
5 | Notre Dame | 84
2 | Creighton | 52
3 | Miami (FL) | 53

Quarterfinals
1 | Michigan | 71
3 | Miami (FL) | 65

=== Louisville Bracket ===
Opening Round
9 | Northern Arizona | 53
10 | Delaware State | 58
7 | Stanford | 65
8 | Virginia | 49

First Round
1 | Louisville | 71
10 | Delaware State | 54
4 | Clemson | 69
5 | Louisiana Tech | 53
2 | Missouri State | 76
7 | Stanford | 67
3 | Houston | 77
6 | BYU | 67

Second Round
1 | Louisville | 74
4 | Clemson | 68
2 | Missouri State | 60
3 | Houston | 59

Quarterfinals
1 | Louisville | 74
2 | Missouri State | 56

=== Cincinnati Bracket ===
Opening Round
9 | Charlotte | 77
10 | Georgia Southern | 61
7 | Miami (OH) | 52
8 | Butler | 53

First Round
1 | Cincinnati | 86
9 | Charlotte | 80
4 | Minnesota | 73
5 | Wake Forest | 58
2 | Florida State | 67
8 | Butler | 63
3 | South Carolina | 74
6 | Western Kentucky | 55

Second Round
1 | Cincinnati | 76
4 | Minnesota | 62
2 | Florida State | 68
3 | South Carolina | 69

Quarterfinal
1 | Cincinnati | 62
3 | South Carolina | 65

=== Semifinals & finals ===
Semifinals
5 | Old Dominion | 43
1 | Michigan | 66
1 | Louisville | 63
3 | South Carolina | 78

Finals
1 | Michigan | 64
3 | South Carolina | 76

== See also ==
- 2006 Women's National Invitation Tournament
- 2006 NCAA Division I men's basketball tournament
- 2006 NCAA Division II men's basketball tournament
- 2006 NCAA Division III men's basketball tournament
- 2006 NCAA Division I women's basketball tournament
- 2006 NAIA Division I men's basketball tournament
- 2006 NAIA Division II men's basketball tournament
