= 2005–06 Duke Blue Devils men's basketball team =

American college basketball season

2005–06 Duke Blue Devils men's basketball

ACC regular season and tournament champions NIT Season Tip-off champions

NCAA tournament, Sweet Sixteen
- Conference: Atlantic Coast Conference

Ranking
- Coaches: No. 7
- AP: No. 1
- Record: 32–4 (14–2 ACC)
- Head coach: Mike Krzyzewski (26th season)
- Assistant coaches: Johnny Dawkins; Chris Collins; Steve Wojciechowski
- Home arena: Cameron Indoor Stadium

2005–06 ACC men's basketball standings
	Conf.				Overall
Team	W		L	PCT	W		L	PCT
No. 1 Duke†	14	–	2	.875	32	–	4	.889
No. 10 North Carolina	12	–	4	.750	23	–	8	.742
No. 7 Boston College	11	–	5	.688	28	–	8	.778
NC State	10	–	6	.625	22	–	10	.688
Florida State	9	–	7	.563	20	–	10	.667
Maryland	8	–	8	.500	19	–	13	.594
Virginia	7	–	9	.438	15	–	15	.500
Miami (FL)	7	–	9	.438	18	–	16	.529
Clemson	7	–	9	.438	19	–	13	.594
Virginia Tech	4	–	12	.250	14	–	16	.467
Georgia Tech	4	–	12	.250	11	–	17	.393
Wake Forest	3	–	13	.188	17	–	17	.500
† 2006 ACC tournament winner Rankings from AP Poll

The 2005–06 Duke Blue Devils men's basketball team represented Duke University. The head coach was Mike Krzyzewski. The team played its home games in the Cameron Indoor Stadium in Durham, North Carolina, and was a member of the Atlantic Coast Conference.

== Recruiting ==
College recruiting information
Name	Hometown	School	Height	Weight	Commit date
Eric Boateng; C	London, England	St. Andrews School (DE)	6 ft 10 in (2.08 m)	255 lb (116 kg)	Aug 25, 2004
Eric Boateng; C	Recruit ratings: Scout: Rivals: (N/A)				
Jamal Boykin; PF	Los Angeles, California	Fairfax High School (Los Angeles)	6 ft 7 in (2.01 m)	230 lb (100 kg)	Jul 31, 2004
Jamal Boykin; PF	Recruit ratings: Scout: Rivals: (N/A)				
Josh McRoberts; PF	Carmel, Indiana	Carmel High School	6 ft 10 in (2.08 m)	240 lb (110 kg)	Sep 16, 2003
Josh McRoberts; PF	Recruit ratings: Scout: Rivals: (N/A)				
Greg Paulus; PG	Syracuse, New York	Christian Brothers High School	6 ft 1 in (1.85 m)	185 lb (84 kg)	Sep 2, 2003
Greg Paulus; PG	Recruit ratings: Scout: Rivals: (N/A)				
Martynas Pocius; SG	Vilnius, Lithuania	Holderness School (NH)	6 ft 5 in (1.96 m)	190 lb (86 kg)	Oct 26, 2004
Martynas Pocius; SG	Recruit ratings: Scout: Rivals: (N/A)				
Overall recruit ranking: Scout: 2 Rivals: 2 ESPN: N/A
Note: In many cases, Scout, Rivals, 247Sports, On3, and ESPN may conflict in their listings of height and weight.; In these cases, the average was taken. ESPN grades are on a 100-point scale.; Sources: "Duke Basketball Commitments". Rivals.; "2005 Duke Basketball Commits". Scout.; "ESPN". ESPN.; "Scout.com Team Recruiting Rankings". Scout.; "2005 Team Ranking". Rivals.

== Roster ==
Name	Number	Position	Height	Weight	Year	Hometown
Eric Boateng	45	C	6–10	255	Freshman	London, England
Jamal Boykin	34	F	6–7	230	Freshman	Los Angeles, California
Jordan Davidson	12	G	6–1	180	Freshman	Melbourne, Arkansas
Patrick Davidson	41	G	6–0	190	Junior	Melbourne, Arkansas
Sean Dockery	15	G	6–2	185	Senior	Chicago, Illinois
Patrick Johnson	51	F	6–9	250	Senior	Atlanta, Georgia
David McClure	14	F	6–6	205	Sophomore	Ridgefield, Connecticut
Josh McRoberts	2	F	6–10	230	Freshman	Carmel, Indiana
Lee Melchionni	13	F	6–6	205	Senior	Lancaster, Pennsylvania
DeMarcus Nelson	21	G	6–3	195	Sophomore	Elk Grove, California
Joe Pagliuca	30	G	6–2	185	Junior	Weston, Massachusetts
Greg Paulus	3	G	6–1	185	Freshman	Syracuse, New York
Ross Perkins	40	G	6–4	200	Senior	Greensboro, North Carolina
Martynas Pocius	5	G	6–4	185	Freshman	Vilnius, Lithuania
JJ Redick	4	G	6–4	190	Senior	Roanoke, Virginia
Shelden Williams	23	F	6–9	250	Senior	Forest Park, Oklahoma

== Schedule ==
Date time, TV	Rank^{#}	Opponent^{#}	Result	Record	Site (attendance) city, state
Regular season
November 14, 2005*; 7:30 pm, ESPN2	No. 1	Boston University; NIT Season Tip-Off	W 64–47	1–0	Cameron Indoor Stadium (9,314); Durham, North Carolina
November 16, 2005*; 7:30 pm, ESPN	No. 1	Seton Hall; NIT Season Tip-Off	W 93–40	2–0	Cameron Indoor Stadium (9,314); Durham, North Carolina
November 19, 2005*; 5:00 pm, ESPN2	No. 1	Davidson	W 84–55	3–0	Cameron Indoor Stadium (9,314); Durham, North Carolina
November 23, 2005*; 7:00 pm, ESPN2	No. 1	vs. Drexel; NIT Season Tip-Off	W 78–68	4–0	Madison Square Garden (9,766); New York City
November 25, 2005*; 6:45 pm, ESPN2	No. 1	vs. No. 11 Memphis; NIT Season Tip-Off	W 70–67	5–0	Madison Square Garden (12,129); New York
November 30, 2005*; 9:00 pm, ESPN	No. 1	at No. 17 Indiana; ACC–Big Ten Challenge	W 75–67	6–0	Assembly Hall (17,343); Bloomington, Indiana
December 4, 2005; 8:00 pm, FSN	No. 1	Virginia Tech	W 77–75	7–0 (1–0)	Cameron Indoor Stadium (9,314); Durham, North Carolina
December 7, 2005*; 7:00 pm, ESPN2	No. 1	Penn	W 72–59	8–0	Cameron Indoor Stadium (9,314); Durham, North Carolina
December 10, 2005*; 1:30 pm, CBS	No. 1	vs. No. 2 Texas	W 97–66	9–0	Continental Airlines Arena (19,579); East Rutherford, New Jersey
December 18, 2005*; 8:00 pm, FSN	No. 1	Valparaiso	W 104–77	10–0	Cameron Indoor Stadium (9,314); Durham, North Carolina
December 21, 2005*; 6:00 pm, ESPN2	No. 1	St. John's	W 70–57	11–0	Cameron Indoor Stadium (9,314); Durham, North Carolina
December 31, 2005*; 1:00 pm, RJ	No. 1	at UNC Greensboro	W 102–69	12–0	Greensboro Coliseum (21,124); Greensboro, North Carolina
January 2, 2006*; 4:30 pm, ESPN	No. 1	Bucknell	W 84–50	13–0	Cameron Indoor Stadium (9,314); Durham, North Carolina
January 8, 2006; 8:00 pm, FSN	No. 1	at No. 23 Wake Forest	W 82–64	14–0 (2–0)	Lawrence Joel Veterans Memorial Coliseum (14,665); Winston-Salem, North Carolina
January 11, 2006; 9:00 pm, ESPN	No. 1	No. 23 Maryland	W 76–52	15–0 (3–0)	Cameron Indoor Stadium (9,314); Durham, North Carolina
January 14, 2006; 2:00 pm, ESPN	No. 1	at Clemson	W 87–77	16–0 (4–0)	Littlejohn Coliseum (10,000); Clemson, South Carolina
January 18, 2006; 7:00 pm, ESPN	No. 1	No. 14 NC State	W 81–68	17–0 (5–0)	Cameron Indoor Stadium (9,314); Durham, North Carolina
January 21, 2006*; 1:30 pm, CBS	No. 1	at Georgetown	L 84–87	17–1	Verizon Center (20,035); Washington, D.C.
January 26, 2006; 7:00 pm, ESPN	No. 2	at Virginia Tech	W 80–67	18–1 (6–0)	Cassell Coliseum (9,847); Blacksburg, Virginia
January 28, 2006; 7:00 pm, ESPN	No. 2	Virginia	W 82–63	19–1 (7–0)	Cameron Indoor Stadium (9,314); Durham, North Carolina
February 1, 2006; 9:00 pm, ESPN	No. 2	at No. 15 Boston College	W 83–81	20–1 (8–0)	Conte Forum (8,606); Chestnut Hill, Massachusetts
February 4, 2006; 12:00 pm, RJ	No. 2	Florida State	W 97–96 ^{OT}	21–1 (9–0)	Cameron Indoor Stadium (9,314); Durham, North Carolina
February 7, 2006; 9:00 pm, ESPN	No. 2	at No. 23 North Carolina	W 87–83	22–1 (10–0)	Dean Smith Center (21,750); Chapel Hill, North Carolina
February 11, 2006; 1:00 pm, CBS	No. 2	at Maryland	W 96–88	23–1 (11–0)	Comcast Center (17,950); College Park, Maryland
February 14, 2006; 8:00 pm, RJ	No. 2	Wake Forest	W 93–70	24–1 (12–0)	Cameron Indoor Stadium (9,314); Durham, North Carolina
February 19, 2006; 5:30 pm, FSN	No. 2	Miami	W 92–71	25–1 (13–0)	Cameron Indoor Stadium (9,314); Durham, North Carolina
February 22, 2006; 7:00 pm, ESPN	No. 1	at Georgia Tech	W 73–66	26–1 (14–0)	Alexander Memorial Coliseum (9,191); Atlanta, Georgia
February 25, 2006*; 2:30 pm, ESPN	No. 1	at Temple	W 74–66	27–1	Wachovia Center (20,313); Philadelphia
March 1, 2006; 7:00 pm, ESPN	No. 1	at Florida State	L 74–79	27–2 (14–1)	Donald L. Tucker Center (12,100); Tallahassee, Florida
March 4, 2006; 9:00 pm, ESPN	No. 1	No. 13 North Carolina; ESPN College GameDay	L 76–83	27–3 (14–2)	Cameron Indoor Stadium (9,314); Durham, North Carolina
ACC Tournament
March 10, 2006; 12:00 pm, ESPN2	(1) No. 3	vs. (8) Miami; Quarterfinals	W 80–76	28–3	Greensboro Coliseum (23,745); Greensboro, North Carolina
March 11, 2006; 1:30 pm, ESPN	(1) No. 3	vs. (12) Wake Forest; Semifinals	W 78–66	29–3	Greensboro Coliseum (23,745); Greensboro, North Carolina
March 12, 2006; 1:00 pm, ESPN	(1) No. 3	vs. (3) No. 11 Boston College; Championship	W 78–76	30–3	Greensboro Coliseum (23,745); Greensboro, North Carolina
NCAA tournament
March 16, 2006; 10:00 pm, CBS	(1 A) No. 1	vs. (16 A) Southern; First Round	W 70–54	31–3	Greensboro Coliseum (22,642); Greensboro, North Carolina
March 18, 2006; 12:00 pm, CBS	(1 A) No. 1	vs. (8 A) No. 14 George Washington; Second Round	W 74–61	32–3	Greensboro Coliseum (22,642); Greensboro, North Carolina
March 23, 2006; 7:00 pm, CBS	(1 A) No. 1	vs. (4 A) No. 19 LSU; Sweet Sixteen	L 54–62	32–4	Georgia Dome (27,130); Atlanta, Georgia
*Non-conference game. ^{#}Rankings from AP Poll. (#) Tournament seedings in parentheses.

== Regular season ==
=== North Carolina ===
February 7, 2006
9 p.m.

Recap

Duke 87, North Carolina 83
Scoring by half: 40–35, 47–48
Pts: JJ Redick 35; Rebs: Shelden Williams 9 Asts: Greg Paulus 7	Pts: Reyshawn Terry 17; Rebs: David Noel, Tyler Hansbrough, Danny Green 9 Asts: David Noel 5
Carolina-Duke rivalry

Smith Center
Attendance: 21,750
Referees: Jamie Luckie, Jim Burr, Tim Higgins

=== Wake Forest ===
JJ Redick set the NCAA record for career three-pointers made.

== NCAA basketball tournament ==
- South
  - Duke 70, Southern 54
  - Duke 74, George Washington 61
  - Louisiana State 62, Duke 54

== Awards and honors ==
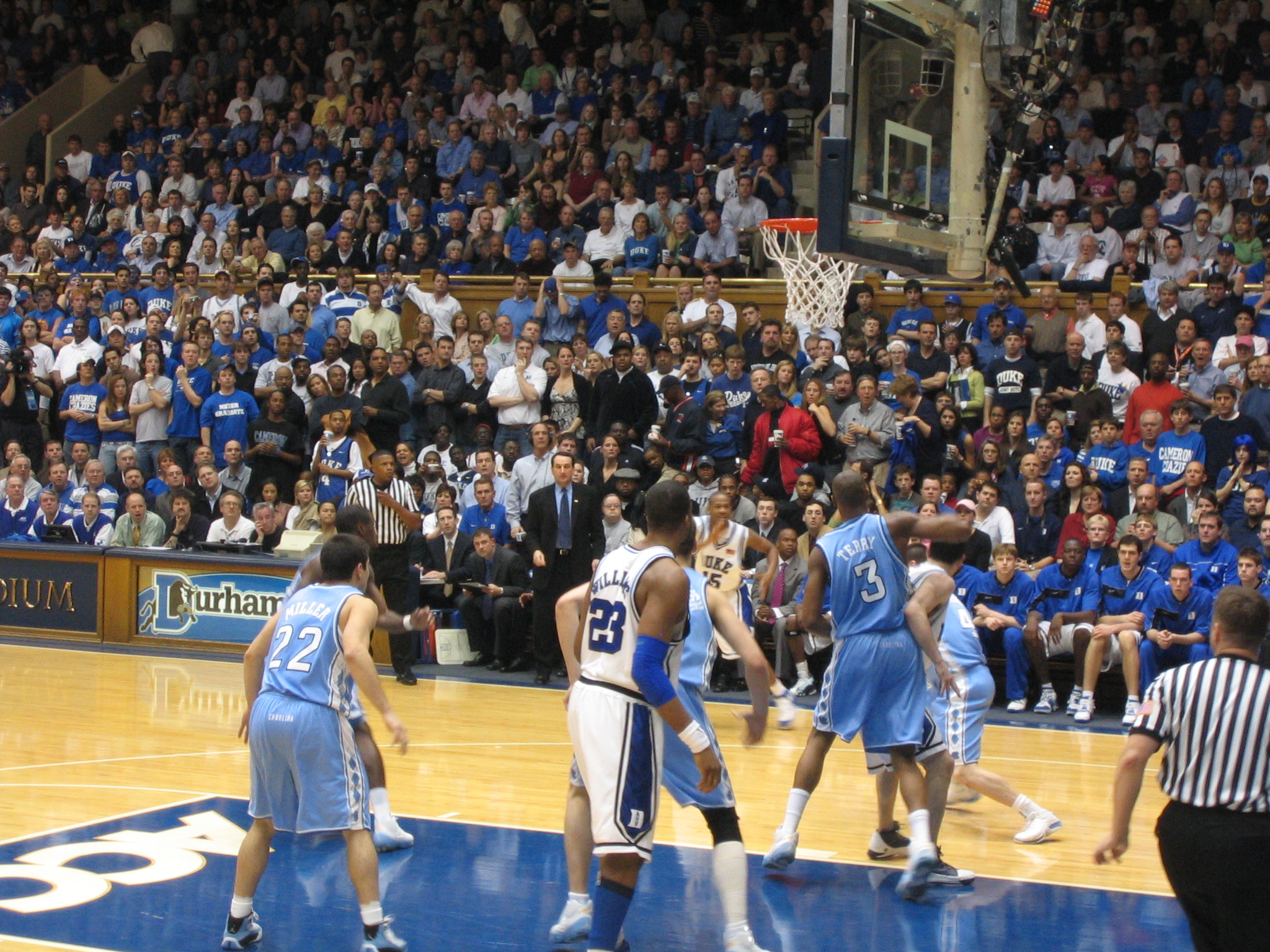
The March 2006 game vs. UNC was the most watched college basketball game in ESPN history.

- JJ Redick, Adolph Rupp Trophy
- JJ Redick, ACC Men's Basketball Player of the Year
- JJ Redick, Naismith College Player of the Year
- JJ Redick, USBWA College Player of the Year
- JJ Redick, John R. Wooden Award
- Shelden Williams, NABC Defensive Player of the Year

== Team players drafted into the NBA ==
Round	Pick	Player	NBA club
1	5	Shelden Williams	Atlanta Hawks
1	11	JJ Redick	Orlando Magic
