= 2005–06 North Carolina Tar Heels men's basketball team =

American college basketball season

2005–06 North Carolina Tar Heels men's basketball

NCAA tournament, Round of 32
- Conference: Atlantic Coast Conference

Ranking
- Coaches: No. 14
- AP: No. 10
- Record: 23–8 (12–4 ACC)
- Head coach: Roy Williams (3rd season)
- Assistant coaches: Joe Holladay; Steve Robinson; Jerod Haase
- Home arena: Dean Smith Center

2005–06 ACC men's basketball standings
	Conf.				Overall
Team	W		L	PCT	W		L	PCT
No. 1 Duke†	14	–	2	.875	32	–	4	.889
No. 10 North Carolina	12	–	4	.750	23	–	8	.742
No. 7 Boston College	11	–	5	.688	28	–	8	.778
NC State	10	–	6	.625	22	–	10	.688
Florida State	9	–	7	.563	20	–	10	.667
Maryland	8	–	8	.500	19	–	13	.594
Virginia	7	–	9	.438	15	–	15	.500
Miami (FL)	7	–	9	.438	18	–	16	.529
Clemson	7	–	9	.438	19	–	13	.594
Virginia Tech	4	–	12	.250	14	–	16	.467
Georgia Tech	4	–	12	.250	11	–	17	.393
Wake Forest	3	–	13	.188	17	–	17	.500
† 2006 ACC tournament winner Rankings from AP Poll

The 2005–06 North Carolina Tar Heels men's basketball team represented the University of North Carolina at Chapel Hill during the 2005–06 NCAA Division I men's basketball season. Their head coach was Roy Williams. The team played its home games in the Dean Smith Center in Chapel Hill, North Carolina, as a member of the Atlantic Coast Conference.

== Recruiting ==
College recruiting
Name	Hometown	School	Height	Weight	Commit date
Mike Copeland; PF	Winston-Salem, North Carolina	R.J. Reynolds HS	6 ft 7 in (2.01 m)	235 lb (107 kg)	Aug 22, 2005
Mike Copeland; PF	Recruit ratings: Scout: Rivals: (N/A)				
Bobby Frasor; SG	Blue Island, Illinois	Brother Rice HS	6 ft 3 in (1.91 m)	210 lb (95 kg)	Jun 2, 2004
Bobby Frasor; SG	Recruit ratings: Scout: Rivals: (N/A)				
Danny Green; SG	North Babylon, New York	St. Mary's HS	6 ft 6 in (1.98 m)	210 lb (95 kg)	Sep 25, 2004
Danny Green; SG	Recruit ratings: Scout: Rivals: (N/A)				
Marcus Ginyard; SG	Alexandria, Virginia	Bishop O'Connell HS	6 ft 5 in (1.96 m)	210 lb (95 kg)	Aug 29, 2003
Marcus Ginyard; SG	Recruit ratings: Scout: Rivals: (N/A)				
Tyler Hansbrough; PF	Poplar Bluff, Missouri	Poplar Bluff HS	6 ft 9 in (2.06 m)	250 lb (110 kg)	Aug 23, 2004
Tyler Hansbrough; PF	Recruit ratings: Scout: Rivals: (N/A)				
Overall recruit ranking: Scout: 4 Rivals: 9 ESPN: N/A
Note: In many cases, Scout, Rivals, 247Sports, On3, and ESPN may conflict in their listings of height and weight.; In these cases, the average was taken. ESPN grades are on a 100-point scale.; Sources: "North Carolina Basketball Commitments". Rivals.; "2005 North Carolina Basketball Commits". Scout.; "ESPN". ESPN.; "Scout.com Team Recruiting Rankings". Scout.; "2005 Team Ranking". Rivals.

== Roster ==
Name	#	Height	Weight	Position	Year	Home town	High school
Dewey Burke	15	6–0	185	Guard	Junior	Philadelphia, PA	Conestoga
Mike Copeland	40	6–7	225	Forward	Freshman	Winston-Salem, NC	R. J. Reynolds
Bobby Frasor	4	6–3	208	Guard	Freshman	Blue Island, IL	Brother Rice
Marcus Ginyard	1	6–5	218	Guard-forward	Freshman	Alexandria, VA	Bishop O'Connell
Danny Green	14	6–6	210	Guard	Freshman	North Babylon, NY	St. Mary's
Tyler Hansbrough	50	6–9	245	Center	Freshman	Poplar Bluff, MO	Poplar Bluff
Wes Miller	22	5–11	190	Guard	Junior	Charlotte, NC	New Hampton Prep (N. H.)
David Noel	34	6–6	232	Forward	Senior	Durham, NC	Southern Durham
Will Robinson	30	6–6	220	Forward	Senior	Chapel Hill, NC	Chapel Hill
Byron Sanders	41	6–9	238	Forward	Senior	Gulfport, MS	Harrison Central
Reyshawn Terry	3	6–8	232	Forward	Junior	Winston-Salem, NC	R. J. Reynolds
Quentin Thomas	11	6–3	185	Guard	Sophomore	Oakland, CA	Oakland Technical Senior
Thomas Wilkins	31	5–8	175	Guard	Senior	Cary, NC	Green Hope
Surry Wood	24	6–5	205	Forward	Sophomore	Raleigh, NC	Cary Academy

== Schedule ==
Atlantic Coast Conference Standing: 2nd
Date	Opponent*	Rank*	Site	Time^{#}	Result	Overall	Conference
Exhibition game
November 4, 2005	Fayetteville State		Chapel Hill, NC		W 94–58	0–0	0–0
November 12, 2005	Catawba College		Chapel Hill, NC		W 89-63	0–0	0–0
Regular season games
November 19, 2005	Gardner-Webb		Chapel Hill, NC		W 83–80	1–0	0–0
November 22, 2005	Cleveland State		Chapel Hill, NC		W 112–55	2–0	0–0
November 25, 2005	UC Santa Barbara		Chapel Hill, NC		W 83–66	3–0	0–0
November 29, 2005	#12 Illinois		Chapel Hill, NC		L 64–68	3–1	0–0
December 3, 2005	#10 Kentucky		Lexington, KY		W 83–79	4–1	0–0
December 7, 2005	Saint Louis	#23	Chapel Hill, NC		W 75–63	5–1	0–0
December 17, 2005	Santa Clara	#19	Chapel Hill, NC		W 76–58	6–1	0–0
December 21, 2005	Southern California	#17	Los Angeles		L 74–59	6–2	0–0
December 28, 2005	UNC Asheville	#23	Chapel Hill, NC		W 89–47	7–2	0–0
January 3, 2006	Davidson	#25	Chapel Hill, NC		W 82–58	8–2	0–0
January 7, 2006	#13 **NC State**	#25	Chapel Hill, NC		W 82–69	9–2	1–0
January 10, 2006	**Virginia Tech**	#20	Blacksburg, VA		W 64–61	10–2	2–0
January 14, 2006	**Miami**	#20	Chapel Hill, NC		L 70–81	10–3	2–1
January 19, 2006	**Virginia**	#24	Charlottesville, VA		L 68–72	10–4	2–2
January 22, 2006	**Florida State**	#24	Tallahassee, FL		W 81–80	11–4	3–2
January 25, 2006	#20 **Boston College**		Chapel Hill, NC		L 74–81	11–5	3–3
January 28, 2006	Arizona		Chapel Hill, NC		W 86–69	12–5	3–3
February 2, 2006	**Maryland**		College Park, MD		W 77–62	13–5	4–3
February 4, 2006	**Clemson**		Chapel Hill, NC		W 76–61	14–5	5–3
February 7, 2006	#2 **Duke**	#23	Chapel Hill, NC		L 83–87	14–6	5–4
February 12, 2006	**Miami**	#23	Coral Gables, FL		W 80–70	15–6	6–4
February 15, 2006	**Georgia Tech**	#23	Chapel Hill, NC		W 82–75	16–6	7–4
February 19, 2006	**Wake Forest**	#23	Winston-Salem, NC		W 83–72	17–6	8–4
February 22, 2006	#15 **NC State**	#21	Raleigh, NC		W 95–71	18–6	9–4
February 26, 2006	**Maryland**	#21	Chapel Hill, NC		W 81–57	19–6	10–4
March 1, 2006	**Virginia**	#13	Chapel Hill, NC		W 99–54	20–6	11–4
March 4, 2006	#1 **Duke**	#13	Durham, NC		W 83–76	21–6	12–4
Atlantic Coast Conference tournament
March 10, 2006	**Virginia**	#10	Greensboro, NC		W 79–67	22–6	
March 11, 2006	#11 **Boston College**	#10	Greensboro, NC	#10	L 82–85	22–7	
NCAA tournament
March 16, 2006	(14) Murray State	(3)	Dayton, OH		W 69–65	23–7	
March 18, 2006	(11) George Mason	(3)	Dayton, OH		L 60–65	23–8	
*Rank according to AP Poll. ^{#}All times are in EST. Conference games in **bold**.

== Team players drafted into the NBA ==
Year	Round	Pick	Player	NBA club
2006	2	39	David Noel	Milwaukee Bucks
2007	2	44	Reyshawn Terry	Orlando Magic
2009	1	13	Tyler Hansbrough	Indiana Pacers
2009	2	46	Danny Green	Cleveland Cavaliers
