= 2005–06 NC State Wolfpack men's basketball team =

American college basketball season

2005–06 NC State Wolfpack men's basketball

NCAA tournament, second round
- Conference: Atlantic Coast Conference
- Record: 22–10 (10–6 ACC)
- Head coach: Herb Sendek (10th season)
- Home arena: RBC Center

2005–06 ACC men's basketball standings
	Conf.				Overall
Team	W		L	PCT	W		L	PCT
No. 1 Duke†	14	–	2	.875	32	–	4	.889
No. 10 North Carolina	12	–	4	.750	23	–	8	.742
No. 7 Boston College	11	–	5	.688	28	–	8	.778
NC State	10	–	6	.625	22	–	10	.688
Florida State	9	–	7	.563	20	–	10	.667
Maryland	8	–	8	.500	19	–	13	.594
Virginia	7	–	9	.438	15	–	15	.500
Miami (FL)	7	–	9	.438	18	–	16	.529
Clemson	7	–	9	.438	19	–	13	.594
Virginia Tech	4	–	12	.250	14	–	16	.467
Georgia Tech	4	–	12	.250	11	–	17	.393
Wake Forest	3	–	13	.188	17	–	17	.500
† 2006 ACC tournament winner Rankings from AP Poll

The 2005–06 NC State Wolfpack men's basketball team represented North Carolina State University as a member of the Atlantic Coast Conference during the 2005–06 men's college basketball season. It was Herb Sendek's 10th season as head coach. The Wolfpack earned a bid to the NCAA tournament, reached the Second round, and finished with a record of 22–10 (10–6 ACC).

== Roster ==
2005–06 NC State Wolfpack men's basketball team
Players
Coaches

Pos.	#	Name	Height	Weight	Year	Hometown
F	3	Ilian Evtimov	6 ft 7 in (2.01 m)	220 lb (100 kg)	Sr	Winston-Salem, North Carolina
G	13	Cameron Bennerman	6 ft 4 in (1.93 m)	205 lb (93 kg)	Sr	Greensboro, North Carolina
G	14	Engin Atsür	6 ft 4 in (1.93 m)	200 lb (91 kg)	Jr	Istanbul, Turkey
F	40	Andrew Brackman	6 ft 10 in (2.08 m)	240 lb (109 kg)	So	Cincinnati, Ohio
C	33	Cedric Simmons	6 ft 9 in (2.06 m)	240 lb (109 kg)	So	Shallotte, North Carolina
G	4	Courtney Fells	6 ft 6 in (1.98 m)	210 lb (95 kg)	Fr	Tupelo, Mississippi

Head coach

- Herb Sendek (Carnegie Mellon)

Assistant coach(es)

Legend

- (C) Team captain
- (S) Suspended
- (I) Ineligible
- (W) Walk-on
- Injured
- Current redshirt

== Schedule and results ==
Date time, TV	Rank^{#}	Opponent^{#}	Result	Record	Site city, state
Regular season
Nov 18, 2005*		Stetson	W 91–61	1–0	RBC Center; Raleigh, NC
Nov 19, 2005*		The Citadel	W 91–59	2–0	RBC Center; Raleigh, NC
Nov 20, 2005*		Delaware	W 73–57	3–0	RBC Center; Raleigh, NC
Nov 23, 2005*		VMI	W 75–55	4–0	RBC Center; Raleigh, NC
Nov 26, 2005*		vs. Notre Dame	W 61–48	5–0	Conseco Fieldhouse; Indianapolis, IN
Nov 30, 2005*	No. 24	at No. 14 Iowa	L 42–45	5–1	Carver–Hawkeye Arena; Iowa City, IA
Dec 10, 2005*	No. 25	Appalachian State	W 92–68	6–1	RBC Center; Raleigh, NC
Dec 14, 2005*	No. 21	UNC Asheville	W 86–56	7–1	RBC Center; Raleigh, NC
Dec 18, 2005	No. 21	Miami (FL)	W 81–69	8–1 (1–0)	RBC Center; Raleigh, NC
Dec 22, 2005*	No. 21	at Alabama	W 68–64	9–1	Coleman Coliseum; Tuscaloosa, AL
Dec 28, 2005*	No. 19	New Hampshire	W 81–62	10–1	RBC Center; Raleigh, NC
Dec 30, 2005*	No. 19	No. 12 George Washington	W 79–58	11–1	RBC Center; Raleigh, NC
Jan 3, 2005*	No. 13	UNC Greensboro	W 83–52	12–1	RBC Center; Raleigh, NC
Jan 7, 2006	No. 13	at No. 25 North Carolina	L 69–82	12–2 (1–1)	Dean Smith Center; Chapel Hill, NC
Jan 10, 2006	No. 18	at No. 15 Boston College	W 78–60	13–2 (2–1)	Conte Forum; Boston, MA
Jan 14, 2006	No. 18	Georgia Tech	W 87–78	14–2 (3–1)	RBC Center; Raleigh, NC
Jan 18, 2006	No. 14	at No. 1 Duke	L 68–81	14–3 (3–2)	Cameron Indoor Stadium; Durham, NC
Jan 21, 2006	No. 14	Wake Forest	W 92–82	15–3 (4–2)	RBC Center; Raleigh, NC
Jan 25, 2006*	No. 15	Seton Hall	L 65–83	15–4	RBC Center; Raleigh, NC
Jan 29, 2006	No. 15	at Clemson	W 94–85 ^{2OT}	16–4 (5–2)	Littlejohn Coliseum; Clemson, SC
Feb 1, 2006	No. 18	Virginia	W 66–64	17–4 (6–2)	RBC Center; Raleigh, NC
Feb 5, 2006	No. 18	Maryland	W 62–58	18–4 (7–2)	RBC Center; Raleigh, NC
Feb 8, 2006	No. 16	at Miami (FL)	W 86–77 ^{2OT}	19–4 (8–2)	BankUnited Center; Coral Gables, FL
Feb 12, 2006	No. 16	at Georgia Tech	L 68–71	19–5 (8–3)	Alexander Memorial Coliseum; Atlanta, GA
Feb 15, 2006	No. 21	Florida State	W 86–64	20–5 (9–3)	RBC Center; Raleigh, NC
Feb 18, 2006	No. 21	at Virginia Tech	W 70–64	21–5 (10–3)	Cassell Coliseum; Blacksburg, VA
Feb 22, 2006	No. 15	No. 21 North Carolina	L 71–95	21–6 (10–4)	RBC Center; Raleigh, NC
Feb 25, 2006	No. 15	No. 11 Boston College	L 72–74 ^{2OT}	21–7 (10–5)	RBC Center; Raleigh, NC
Mar 4, 2006	No. 22	at Wake Forest	L 63–76	21–8 (10–6)	LJVM Coliseum; Winston-Salem, NC
ACC Tournament
Mar 10, 2006	(4) No. 25	vs. (12) Wake Forest; Quarterfinals	L 71–82	21–9	Greensboro Coliseum; Greensboro, NC]
NCAA Tournament
Mar 17, 2006*	(10 S)	vs. (7 S) California; First Round	W 58–52	22–9	American Airlines Center; Dallas, TX
Mar 19, 2006*	(10 S)	vs. (2 S) No. 9 Texas; Second Round	L 54–75	22–10	American Airlines Center; Dallas, TX
*Non-conference game. ^{#}Rankings from AP Poll. (#) Tournament seedings in parentheses. S=South. All times are in Eastern Time.
