= 2005–06 Miami Hurricanes men's basketball team =

American college basketball season

2005–06 Miami Hurricanes men's basketball

NIT, Quarterfinals
- Conference: Atlantic Coast Conference
- Record: 18-16 (7-9 ACC)
- Head coach: Frank Haith
- Home arena: BankUnited Center

2005–06 ACC men's basketball standings
	Conf.				Overall
Team	W		L	PCT	W		L	PCT
No. 1 Duke†	14	–	2	.875	32	–	4	.889
No. 10 North Carolina	12	–	4	.750	23	–	8	.742
No. 7 Boston College	11	–	5	.688	28	–	8	.778
NC State	10	–	6	.625	22	–	10	.688
Florida State	9	–	7	.563	20	–	10	.667
Maryland	8	–	8	.500	19	–	13	.594
Virginia	7	–	9	.438	15	–	15	.500
Miami (FL)	7	–	9	.438	18	–	16	.529
Clemson	7	–	9	.438	19	–	13	.594
Virginia Tech	4	–	12	.250	14	–	16	.467
Georgia Tech	4	–	12	.250	11	–	17	.393
Wake Forest	3	–	13	.188	17	–	17	.500
† 2006 ACC tournament winner Rankings from AP Poll

The 2005–06 Miami Hurricanes men's basketball team represented the University of Miami during the 2005–06 NCAA Division I men's basketball season. The Hurricanes, led by head coach Frank Haith, played their home games at the BankUnited Center and were members of the Atlantic Coast Conference.

On December 31, 2005, Louisville defeated Miami in the Orange Bowl Basketball Classic, 58–43.

They finished the season with a 18–16 record. The Hurricanes were eliminated from the ACC tournament in the quarterfinals on March 10, 2006, losing to Duke 80–76. They participated in the 2006 NIT, defeating Oklahoma State and Creighton before losing to Michigan in the NIT quarterfinals on March 22, 2006.
