= 2006 ACC men's basketball tournament =

- 2006 ACC Tournament logo
- Classification: Division I
- Season: 2005–06
- Teams: 12
- Site: Greensboro Coliseum; Greensboro, North Carolina
- Champions: Duke (16th title)
- Winning coach: Mike Krzyzewski (10th title)
- MVP: J. J. Redick (Duke)

The 2006 Atlantic Coast Conference men's basketball tournament took place from March 9 to 12 in Greensboro, North Carolina, at the Greensboro Coliseum. Duke won the tournament for the 16th time. Duke's J.J. Redick won the tournament's Most Valuable Player Award for the second year in a row.

The 2006 ACC Tournament was the first tournament with 12 teams participating. Boston College made its first appearance in the tournament, reaching the championship game before losing to Duke. 12th-seeded Wake Forest made a Cinderella run, beating 5th-seeded Florida State and 4th-seeded NC State on their way to the semifinal round, before losing to eventual champions Duke.

Miami and Boston College won their first ACC Tournament games in 2006. Miami defeated Clemson in the first round. Boston College defeated Maryland in the quarterfinal round.

2005–06 ACC men's basketball standings
	Conf.				Overall
Team	W		L	PCT	W		L	PCT
No. 1 Duke†	14	–	2	.875	32	–	4	.889
No. 10 North Carolina	12	–	4	.750	23	–	8	.742
No. 7 Boston College	11	–	5	.688	28	–	8	.778
NC State	10	–	6	.625	22	–	10	.688
Florida State	9	–	7	.563	20	–	10	.667
Maryland	8	–	8	.500	19	–	13	.594
Virginia	7	–	9	.438	15	–	15	.500
Miami (FL)	7	–	9	.438	18	–	16	.529
Clemson	7	–	9	.438	19	–	13	.594
Virginia Tech	4	–	12	.250	14	–	16	.467
Georgia Tech	4	–	12	.250	11	–	17	.393
Wake Forest	3	–	13	.188	17	–	17	.500
† 2006 ACC tournament winner Rankings from AP Poll

== Bracket ==
First round March 9, 2006
8	Miami	66
9	Clemson	63
5	Florida State	66
12	Wake Forest	78
7	Virginia	60
10	Virginia Tech	56
6	Maryland	82
11	Georgia Tech	64

Quarterfinals; March 10, 2006
1	#1 Duke	80
8	Miami	76
4	NC State	71
12	Wake Forest	82
2	#10 North Carolina	79
7	Virginia	67
3	#7 Boston College	80
6	Maryland	66

Semifinals; March 11, 2006
1	#1 Duke	78
12	Wake Forest	66
2	#10 North Carolina	82
3	#7 Boston College	85

Championship Game; March 12, 2006
1	#1 Duke	78
3	#7 Boston College	76

AP Rankings at time of tournament
