= Pelphrey =

Pelphrey is a surname. Notable people with the surname include:

- John Pelphrey (born 1968), American college basketball coach and player
- Tom Pelphrey (born 1982), American actor
