= 2006 Ohio Valley Conference men's basketball tournament =

- Classification: Division I
- Season: 2005–06
- Teams: 8
- First round site: Campus Sites
- Semifinals site: Gaylord Entertainment Center; Nashville, Tennessee
- Finals site: Gaylord Entertainment Center; Nashville, Tennessee
- Champions: Murray State (13th title)
- Winning coach: Mick Cronin (2nd title)
- MVP: Pearson Griffith (Murray State)

2005–06 Ohio Valley Conference men's basketball standings
	Conf.				Overall
Team	W		L	PCT	W		L	PCT
Murray State †	17	–	3	.850	24	–	7	.774
Samford	14	–	6	.700	20	–	11	.645
Tennessee Tech	13	–	7	.650	19	–	12	.613
Jacksonville State	12	–	8	.600	16	–	13	.552
Eastern Kentucky	11	–	9	.550	14	–	16	.467
Austin Peay	11	–	9	.550	17	–	14	.548
Tennessee State	11	–	9	.550	13	–	15	.464
UT Martin	9	–	11	.450	13	–	15	.464
Eastern Illinois	5	–	15	.250	7	–	20	.259
Southeast Missouri State	4	–	16	.200	7	–	20	.259
Morehead State	3	–	17	.150	4	–	23	.148
† 2006 Ohio Valley Conference tournament winner Rankings from AP Poll

The 2006 Ohio Valley Conference men's basketball tournament was the postseason men's basketball tournament of the Ohio Valley Conference during the 2005–06 NCAA Division I men's basketball season. It was held February 28 – March 3, 2006. The first round was hosted by the higher seeded team in each game. The semifinals and finals took place at Gaylord Entertainment Center in Nashville, Tennessee. Top seed Murray State won the tournament, defeating Samford in the championship game, and received the Ohio Valley's automatic bid to the NCAA tournament. Murray State drew a 14 seed in the Washington, D.C. Regional, facing the 3 seed University of North Carolina.

== Format ==
The top eight eligible men's basketball teams in the Ohio Valley Conference receive a berth in the conference tournament. After the 20 game conference season, teams were seeded by conference record.

== Bracket ==
Quarterfinals; February 28
1	Murray State	65
8	UT Martin	52
4	Jacksonville State	86
5	Eastern Kentucky	59
3	Tennessee Tech	78
6	Austin Peay	74
2	Samford	78
7	Tennessee State	67

Semifinals; March 2
1	Murray State	69
4	Jacksonville State	60
3	Tennessee Tech	66
2	Samford	73

Finals; March 3
1	Murray State	74
2	Samford	57
