= 2006 Sun Belt Conference men's basketball tournament =

- Classification: Division I
- Season: 2005–06
- Teams: 11
- Site: Murphy Center; Murfreesboro, TN
- Champions: South Alabama (5th title)
- Winning coach: John Pelphrey (1st title)
- MVP: Chey Christie (South Alabama)

2005–06 Sun Belt Conference men's basketball standings
	Conf.				Overall
Team	W		L	PCT	W		L	PCT
East
Western Kentucky	12	–	2	.857	23	–	8	.742
Middle Tennessee	8	–	6	.571	16	–	12	.571
Arkansas State	7	–	7	.500	12	–	18	.400
Arkansas-Little Rock	5	–	9	.357	14	–	15	.483
Florida International	4	–	10	.286	8	–	20	.286
West
South Alabama †	12	–	3	.800	24	–	7	.774
Louisiana–Lafayette	7	–	8	.467	13	–	16	.448
Denver	7	–	8	.467	15	–	16	.484
New Orleans	6	–	9	.400	10	–	19	.345
North Texas	6	–	9	.400	14	–	14	.500
Troy	6	–	9	.400	14	–	15	.483
† 2006 Sun Belt Conference tournament winner Rankings from AP Poll

The 2006 Sun Belt Conference men's basketball tournament took place March 3–7, 2006. The tournament took place in Murfreesboro, TN at the Murphy Center on the campus of Middle Tennessee State University. The Semifinals were televised on ESPN Plus with the Championship game being televised on ESPN2.

== Bracket ==
First Round; March 3
4E	Arkansas-Little Rock	72
5W	North Texas	55
4W	New Orleans	76
5E	Florida International	56
3E	Arkansas State	83
6W	Troy	107

Quarterfinals; March 5
1W	South Alabama	76
4E	Arkansas-Little Rock	53
2E	Middle Tennessee	57
3W	Denver	58
1E	WKU	80
4W	New Orleans	61
2W	UL-Lafayette	62 (OT)
6W	Troy	59

Semifinals; March 6
1W	South Alabama	75
3W	Denver	65
1E	WKU	80
2W	UL-Lafayette	72

Championship game March 7
1W	South Alabama	95
1E	WKU	70
