= 2006 SEC men's basketball tournament =

- Classification: Division I
- Season: 2005–06
- Teams: 12
- Site: Gaylord Entertainment Center; Nashville, Tennessee
- Champions: Florida (2nd title)
- Winning coach: Billy Donovan (2nd title)
- MVP: Taurean Green, Florida
- Attendance: 183,122
- Television: Jefferson Pilot Sports, CBS

2005–06 Southeastern Conference men's basketball standings
	Conf.				Overall
Team	W		L	PCT	W		L	PCT
East
No. 18 Tennessee	12	–	4	.750	22	–	8	.733
No. 11 Florida †	10	–	6	.625	33	–	6	.846
Kentucky	9	–	7	.563	22	–	13	.629
Vanderbilt	7	–	9	.438	17	–	13	.567
South Carolina	6	–	10	.375	23	–	15	.605
Georgia	5	–	11	.313	15	–	15	.500
West
No. 19 LSU	14	–	2	.875	27	–	9	.750
Alabama	10	–	6	.625	18	–	13	.581
Arkansas	10	–	6	.625	22	–	10	.688
Mississippi State	5	–	11	.313	15	–	15	.500
Auburn	4	–	12	.250	12	–	16	.429
Ole Miss	4	–	12	.250	14	–	16	.467
† 2006 SEC tournament winner Rankings from AP Poll

The 2006 SEC men's basketball tournament took place from March 9–12, 2006 in Nashville, Tennessee at the Gaylord Entertainment Center. The SEC Championship Game was televised by CBS.

The top two teams in both the Eastern and Western Divisions received byes in the first round, which were Tennessee, Alabama, LSU, and Florida and played their second round games on March 10, 2006. The SEC Tournament winner (Florida) received the SEC's automatic bid to the NCAA Tournament en route to winning the 2006 NCAA National Championship.

== Final SEC Regular Season Standings ==
SEC East
School	Coach	W	L	Pct	Seed
Tennessee	Bruce Pearl	12	4	.750	E1
Florida	Billy Donovan	10	6	.625	E2
Kentucky	Tubby Smith	9	7	.563	E3
Vanderbilt	Kevin Stallings	7	9	.438	E4
South Carolina	Dave Odom	6	10	.375	E5
Georgia	Dennis Felton	5	11	.313	E6

SEC West
School	Coach	W	L	Pct	Seed
LSU	John Brady	14	2	.875	W1
Alabama	Mark Gottfried	10	6	.625	W2
Arkansas	Stan Heath	10	6	.625	W3
Mississippi State	Rick Stansbury	5	11	.313	W4
Auburn	Jeff Lebo	4	12	.250	W5
Mississippi	Rod Barnes	4	12	.250	W6

== Bracket ==
First round
E5	South Carolina	59
W4	Mississippi State	44
E3	Kentucky	71
W6	Mississippi	57
E4	Vanderbilt	76
W5	Auburn	71
W3	Arkansas	80
E6	Georgia	67

Second Round
E5	South Carolina	79
E1	#14 Tennessee	71
E3	Kentucky	68
W2	Alabama	61
W1	#18 LSU	92
E4	Vanderbilt	73
E2	#16 Florida	74
W3	Arkansas	71

Semifinals
E5	South Carolina	65
E3	Kentucky	61
E2	#16 Florida	81
W1	#18 LSU	65

Championship game
E2	#16 Florida	49
E5	South Carolina	47
