= 2005–06 Murray State Racers men's basketball team =

American college basketball season

2005–06 Murray State Racers men's basketball
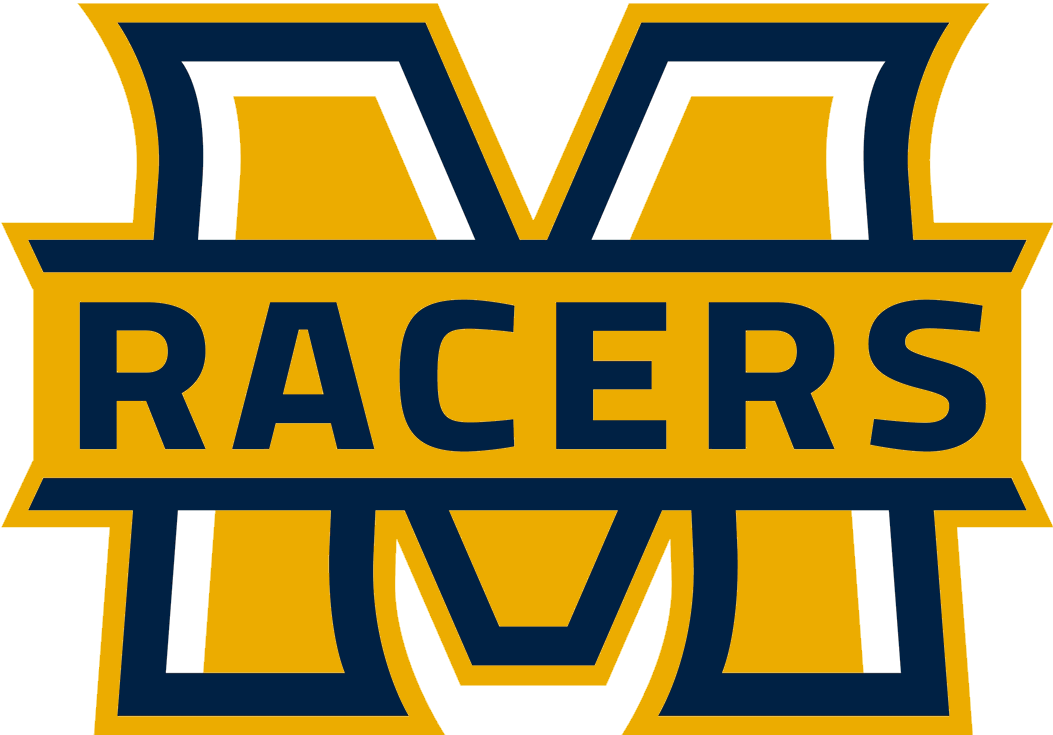

Ohio Valley tournament Ohio Valley Season champions

NCAA tournament, first round
- Conference: Ohio Valley Conference
- Record: 24–7 (17–3 OVC)
- Head coach: Mick Cronin (3rd season)
- Home arena: Regional Special Events Center

2005–06 Ohio Valley Conference men's basketball standings
	Conf.				Overall
Team	W		L	PCT	W		L	PCT
Murray State †	17	–	3	.850	24	–	7	.774
Samford	14	–	6	.700	20	–	11	.645
Tennessee Tech	13	–	7	.650	19	–	12	.613
Jacksonville State	12	–	8	.600	16	–	13	.552
Eastern Kentucky	11	–	9	.550	14	–	16	.467
Austin Peay	11	–	9	.550	17	–	14	.548
Tennessee State	11	–	9	.550	13	–	15	.464
UT Martin	9	–	11	.450	13	–	15	.464
Eastern Illinois	5	–	15	.250	7	–	20	.259
Southeast Missouri State	4	–	16	.200	7	–	20	.259
Morehead State	3	–	17	.150	4	–	23	.148
† 2006 Ohio Valley Conference tournament winner Rankings from AP Poll

The 2005–06 Murray State Racers men's basketball team represented Murray State University during the 2005–06 NCAA Division I men's basketball season. The Racers, led by third-year head coach Mick Cronin, played their home games at Racer Arena in Murray, Kentucky, as members of the Ohio Valley Conference. They finished the season 24–7, 17–3 in OVC play to win the OVC regular season title. They defeated Samford to win the OVC tournament to advance to the NCAA tournament. Playing as No. 14 seed in the Washington, D.C. region, the Racers were narrowly beaten by No. 3 seed and defending National champion North Carolina, 69–65.

== Roster ==
2005–06 Murray State Racers men's basketball team
Players	Coaches
Pos. / # / Name / Height / Weight / Year / Hometown; F / 22 / Shawn Witherspoon / 6 ft 5 in (1.96 m) / 208 lb (94 kg) / Sr / Oviedo, Florida	Head coach: Mick Cronin (Cincinnati); Assistant coach(es) Legend: (C) Team captain; (S) Suspended; (I) Ineligible; (W) Walk-on; Injured; Current redshirt

== Schedule and results ==
Date time, TV	Rank^{#}	Opponent^{#}	Result	Record	Site (attendance) city, state
Exhibition
Nov 5, 2005*; 7:30 p.m.		Bellarmine	W 59–53		Regional Special Events Center; Murray, Kentucky
Nov 10, 2005*; 7:30 p.m.		Christian Brothers	W 81–37		Regional Special Events Center; Murray, Kentucky
Regular season
Nov 19, 2005*; 6:00 p.m.		at Cincinnati	L 75–79 ^{OT}	0–1	Fifth Third Arena (8,088); Cincinnati, Ohio
Nov 22, 2005*; 7:30 p.m.		Campbellsville	W 76–51	1–1	Regional Special Events Center; Murray, Kentucky
Nov 30, 2005*; 7:00 p.m.		vs. Tennessee	L 53–64	1–2	Gaylord Entertainment Center (6,745); Nashville, Tennessee
Dec 3, 2005*; 2:00 p.m.		at UTSA	W 89–79 ^{OT}	2–2	Convocation Center; San Antonio, Texas
Dec 8, 2005; 6:30 p.m., ESPNU		Eastern Kentucky	W 80–51	3–2 (1–0)	Regional Special Events Center; Murray, Kentucky
Dec 10, 2005; 7:30 p.m.		Morehead State	W 92–40	4–2 (2–0)	Regional Special Events Center; Murray, Kentucky
Dec 19, 2005; 7:00 p.m.		at Jacksonville State	W 91–72	5–2 (3–0)	Pete Mathews Coliseum; Jacksonville, Alabama
Dec 21, 2005; 7:00 p.m.		at Samford	L 50–61	5–3 (3–1)	Seibert Hall; Homewood, Alabama
Dec 28, 2005*; 9:00 p.m., ESPNU		Southern Illinois	W 76–51	6–3	Regional Special Events Center (4,297); Murray, Kentucky
Dec 30, 2005*; 7:30 p.m.		Rice	W 83–65	7–3	Regional Special Events Center; Murray, Kentucky
Jan 5, 2006; 7:30 p.m.		Tennessee State	W 75–67	8–3 (4–1)	Regional Special Events Center; Murray, Kentucky
Jan 7, 2006; 7:30 p.m.		Southeast Missouri State	W 81–68	9–3 (5–1)	Regional Special Events Center; Murray, Kentucky
Jan 9, 2006; 7:30 p.m.		Eastern Illinois	W 66–65	10–3 (6–1)	Regional Special Events Center; Murray, Kentucky
Jan 16, 2006; 7:35 p.m.		at Eastern Illinois	L 54–59	11–4 (7–2)	Lantz Arena; Charleston, Illinois
Jan 21, 2006; 6:00 p.m.		at UT Martin	W 79–73	12–4 (8–2)	Skyhawk Arena; Martin, Tennessee
Jan 26, 2006; 7:30 p.m.		Tennessee Tech	W 55–51	13–4 (9–2)	Regional Special Events Center; Murray, Kentucky
Jan 28, 2006; 3:00 p.m., ESPN2		at Southeast Missouri State	W 76–69	14–4 (10–2)	Show Me Center; Cape Girardeau, Missouri
Jan 30, 2006; 7:30 p.m.		Samford	W 59–38	15–4 (11–2)	Regional Special Events Center; Murray, Kentucky
Feb 2, 2006; 7:30 p.m.		at Austin Peay	W 69–68 ^{OT}	16–4 (12–2)	Dunn Center; Clarksville, Tennessee
Feb 4, 2006; 7:30 p.m.		Jacksonville State	W 78–72	17–4 (13–2)	Regional Special Events Center; Murray, Kentucky
Feb 9, 2006; 6:30 p.m.		at Eastern Kentucky	W 62–45	18–4 (14–2)	Alumni Coliseum; Richmond, Kentucky
Feb 11, 2006; 6:45 p.m.		at Morehead State	W 71–56	19–4 (15–2)	Ellis Johnson Arena; Morehead, Kentucky
Feb 16, 2006; 7:30 p.m.		at Tennessee State	W 77–52	20–4 (16–2)	Gentry Complex; Nashville, Tennessee
Feb 18, 2006*; 6:00 p.m.		UIC; ESPN BracketBusters	W 72–68	21–4	Regional Special Events Center; Murray, Kentucky
Feb 23, 2006; 8:00 p.m., ESPNU		at Tennessee Tech	L 66–70	21–5 (16–3)	Hooper Eblen Center; Cookeville, Tennessee
Feb 25, 2006; 7:30 p.m.		UT Martin	W 81–63	22–5 (17–3)	Regional Special Events Center; Murray, Kentucky
Ohio Valley Conference tournament
Feb 28, 2006*; 7:00 p.m.	(1)	(8) Tennessee-Martin; Quarterfinals	W 65–52	22–6	Regional Special Events Center (3,175); Murray, Kentucky
Mar 3, 2006*; 6:00 p.m., ESPNU	(1)	vs. (4) Jacksonville State; Semifinals	W 69–64	23–6	Gaylord Entertainment Center (3,274); Nashville, Tennessee
Mar 4, 2006*; 3:00 p.m., ESPN2	(1)	vs. (2) Samford; Championship game	W 74–57	24–6	Gaylord Entertainment Center (3,679); Nashville, Tennessee
NCAA tournament
Mar 17, 2006*; 8:47 p.m., KFVS-12	(14 DC)	vs. (3 DC) No. 10 North Carolina; First round	L 65–69	24–7	UD Arena (12,945); Dayton, Ohio
*Non-conference game. ^{#}Rankings from AP Poll. (#) Tournament seedings in parentheses. DC=Washington, D.C.. All times are in Central Time.
