= 2005–06 Florida Gators men's basketball team =

American college basketball season

2005–06 Florida Gators men's basketball

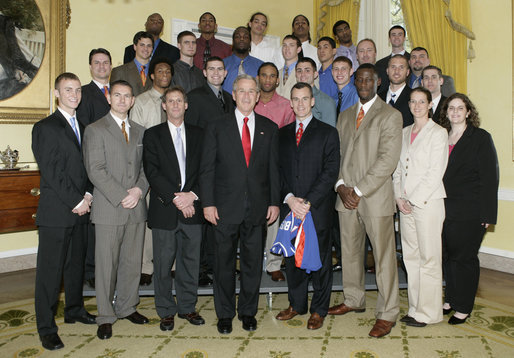
- The 2006 championship team visits the White House.

NCAA tournament National Champions SEC tournament champions

National Championship Game, W 73–57 vs. UCLA
- Conference: Southeastern Conference
- East

Ranking
- Coaches: No. 1
- AP: No. 11
- Record: 33–6 (10–6 SEC)
- Head coach: Billy Donovan (10th season)
- Assistant coach: Anthony Grant; Donnie Jones; Larry Shyatt
- Home arena: O'Connell Center

2005–06 Southeastern Conference men's basketball standings
	Conf.				Overall
Team	W		L	PCT	W		L	PCT
East
No. 18 Tennessee	12	–	4	.750	22	–	8	.733
No. 11 Florida †	10	–	6	.625	33	–	6	.846
Kentucky	9	–	7	.563	22	–	13	.629
Vanderbilt	7	–	9	.438	17	–	13	.567
South Carolina	6	–	10	.375	23	–	15	.605
Georgia	5	–	11	.313	15	–	15	.500
West
No. 19 LSU	14	–	2	.875	27	–	9	.750
Alabama	10	–	6	.625	18	–	13	.581
Arkansas	10	–	6	.625	22	–	10	.688
Mississippi State	5	–	11	.313	15	–	15	.500
Auburn	4	–	12	.250	12	–	16	.429
Ole Miss	4	–	12	.250	14	–	16	.467
† 2006 SEC tournament winner Rankings from AP Poll

The 2005–06 Florida Gators men's basketball team represented the University of Florida in the sport of basketball during the 2005–06 college basketball season. The Gators competed in Division I of the National Collegiate Athletic Association (NCAA) and the Eastern Division of the Southeastern Conference (SEC). They were led by head coach Billy Donovan, and played their home games in the O'Connell Center on the university's Gainesville, Florida campus.

The Gators started the season looking to end their recent streak of losing in the first two rounds of the NCAA tournament. They finished the season with a 24–6 record entering the SEC Championship. They won all three games and received a No. 3 seed in the NCAA tournament, eventually playing in the final against UCLA. On April 3, 2006, Florida beat UCLA 73–57 to win its first-ever NCAA Championship.

== Class of 2005 ==
College recruiting
Name	Hometown	School	Height	Weight	Commit date
Walter Hodge; PG	Melbourne, Florida	Florida Air Academy	6 ft 0 in (1.83 m)	170 lb (77 kg)	Apr 11, 2005
Walter Hodge; PG	Recruit ratings: Scout: Rivals:				
David Huertas; SG	Jacksonville, Florida	Arlington Country Day School	6 ft 4 in (1.93 m)	190 lb (86 kg)	Jul 2, 2004
David Huertas; SG	Recruit ratings: Scout: Rivals:				
Jimmie Sutton; C	Coconut Creek, Florida	North Broward Prep	6 ft 9 in (2.06 m)	250 lb (110 kg)	Sep 11, 2004
Jimmie Sutton; C	Recruit ratings: Scout: Rivals:				
Overall Recruiting Rankings: Scout – 21 Rivals – NR ESPN –

== Roster ==
Name	Number	Position	Height	Weight	Class	Hometown
Jack Berry	22	G	6–6	215	Sophomore	Windermere, Florida
Corey Brewer	2	F	6–9	185	Sophomore	Portland, Tennessee
Taurean Green	11	G	6–0	177	Sophomore	Ft. Lauderdale, Florida
Garrett Tyler	25	G/F	6–7	200	Junior	Palm Harbor, Florida
Walter Hodge	15	G	6–0	170	Freshman	Guaynabo, Puerto Rico
Al Horford	42	F/C	6–10	245	Sophomore	Grand Ledge, Michigan
David Huertas	33	G	6–5	185	Freshman	Humacao, Puerto Rico
Lee Humphrey	12	G	6–2	192	Junior	Maryville, Tennessee
Adrian Moss	4	F	6–9	247	Senior	Houston, Texas
Joakim Noah	13	F/C	6–11	230	Sophomore	New York, New York
Chris Richard	32	F/C	6–9	255	Junior	Lakeland, Florida
Jimmie Sutton	5	F/C	6–10	252	Freshman	Deerfield Beach, Florida
Brett Swanson	1	G	6–2	180	Junior	Pace, Florida

=== Coaches ===
Name	Type	College	Graduating year
Billy Donovan	Head coach	Providence College	1987
Anthony Grant	Associate head coach	University of Dayton	1987
Donnie Jones	AssistantCoach	Pikeville College	1988
Larry Shyatt	Assistant Coach	College of Wooster	1973
Darren Hertz	Assistant to the head coach	University of Florida	1997
Adam Beaupre	Video coordinator	University of Florida	1999
Matt Herring	Strength & Conditioning Coordinator	University of Texas Southwestern	1994
Dave Werner	Athletic Trainer	Eastern Kentucky University	1991
Tom Williams	Academic Counselor		

== Schedule and results ==
Date time, TV	Rank^{#}	Opponent^{#}	Result	Record	Site city, state
Exhibition
November 1, 2005*; 7:00 pm		Embry-Riddle	W 86–48		O'Connell Center; Gainesville, FL
November 4, 2005*; 7:00 pm		West Florida	W 84–41		O'Connell Center; Gainesville, FL
Regular season
November 9, 2005*; 7:30 pm, FSN		St. Peter's College	W 80–51	1–0	O'Connell Center; Gainesville, FL
November 10, 2005*; 8:00 pm, FSN		Albany College	W 83–64	2–0	O'Connell Center; Gainesville, FL
November 17, 2005*; 7:00 pm, ESPN		vs. No. 19 Wake Forest	W 77–72	3–0	Madison Square Garden; New York, NY
November 18, 2005*; 9:15 pm, ESPN2		vs. No. 16 Syracuse	W 75–70	4–0	Madison Square Garden; New York, NY
November 25, 2005*; 7:30 pm, FSN	No. 14	Florida State	W 74–66	5–0	O'Connell Center; Gainesville, FL
November 28, 2005*; 7:00 pm, FSN	No. 14	Alabama State	W 87–60	6–0	O'Connell Center; Gainesville, FL
December 3, 2005*; 12:00 pm, SUN	No. 11	Central Florida	W 80–47	7–0	O'Connell Center; Gainesville, FL
December 6, 2005*; 7:30 pm, SUN	No. 10	at Providence	W 87–77	8–0	Dunkin' Donuts Center; Providence, RI
December 9, 2005*; 8:30 pm, FSN	No. 10	Bethune-Cookman	W 88–58	9–0	O'Connell Center; Gainesville, FL
December 18, 2005*; 1:00 pm, SUN	No. 7	Jacksonville	W 101–58	10–0	O'Connell Center; Gainesville, FL
December 22, 2005*; 7:00 pm, FSN	No. 5	at Miami	W 77–67	11–0	BankUnited Center; Coral Gables, FL
December 30, 2005*; 1:00 pm, SUN	No. 5	Florida A&M	W 84–47	12–0	O'Connell Center; Gainesville, FL
January 3, 2006*; 6:00 pm	No. 5	Morgan State	W 92–49	13–0	O'Connell Center; Gainesville, FL
January 7, 2006; 12:00 pm, JP	No. 5	at Georgia	W 90–72	14–0 (1–0)	Stegeman Coliseum; Athens, GA
January 11, 2006; 7:00 pm	No. 2	Mississippi State	W 75–60	15–0 (2–0)	O'Connell Center; Gainesville, FL
January 14, 2006; 6:00 pm, FSN	No. 2	Auburn	W 69–57	16–0 (3–0)	O'Connell Center; Gainesville, FL
January 18, 2006*; 7:00 pm	No. 2	Savannah State	W 113–62	17–0	O'Connell Center; Gainesville, FL
January 21, 2006; 7:00 pm, FSN	No. 2	at Tennessee	L 76–80	17–1 (3–1)	Thompson-Boling Arena; Knoxville, TN
January 25, 2006; 8:00 pm, JP	No. 5	at South Carolina	L 62–68	17–2 (3–2)	Colonial Center; Columbia, SC
January 28, 2006; 1:00 pm, JP	No. 5	Vanderbilt	W 81–58	18–2 (4–2)	O'Connell Center; Gainesville, FL
January 31, 2006; 8:00 pm, ESPN2	No. 8	at Ole Miss	W 69–58	19–2 (5–2)	Tad Smith Coliseum; Oxford, MS
February 4, 2006; 9:00 pm, ESPN2	No. 8	Kentucky; ESPN College GameDay	W 95–80	20–2 (6–2)	O'Connell Center; Gainesville, FL
February 8, 2006; 7:00 pm, SUN	No. 7	South Carolina	L 67–71	20–3 (6–3)	O'Connell Center; Gainesville, FL
February 11, 2006; 1:00 pm, JP	No. 7	LSU	W 71–62	21–3 (7–3)	O'Connell Center; Gainesville, FL
February 15, 2006; 8:00 pm, SUN	No. 10	at Vanderbilt	W 73–68	22–3 (8–3)	Memorial Gymnasium; Nashville, TN
February 18, 2006; 2:00 pm, JP	No. 10	at Arkansas	L 81–85	22–4 (8–4)	Bud Walton Arena; Fayetteville, AR
February 22, 2006; 8:00 pm, JP	No. 12	No. 10 Tennessee	L 72–76	22–5 (8–5)	O'Connell Center; Gainesville, FL
February 26, 2006; 4:00 pm, CBS	No. 12	at Alabama	L 77–82	22–6 (8–6)	Coleman Coliseum; Tuscaloosa, AL
March 1, 2006; 7:00 pm, FSN	No. 17	Georgia	W 77–66	23–6 (9–6)	O'Connell Center; Gainesville, FL
March 6, 2006; 7:00 pm, CBS	No. 16	at Kentucky	W 79–64	24–6 (10–6)	Rupp Arena; Lexington, KY
SEC Tournament
March 10, 2006; 9:45 pm, JP	No. 16	vs. Arkansas; SEC Championship round 2	W 74–71	25–6	Gaylord Entertainment Center; Nashville, TN
March 11, 2006; 3:15 pm, JP	No. 16	vs. No. 18 LSU; SEC Championship round 3	W 81–65	26–6	Gaylord Entertainment Center; Nashville, TN
March 12, 2006; 1:00 pm, CBS	No. 16	vs. South Carolina; SEC Championship game	W 49–47	27–6	Gaylord Entertainment Center; Nashville, TN
NCAA Division I Tournament
March 16, 2006; 2:45 pm, CBS	(3) No. 11	vs. (14) South Alabama; First round	W 76–50	28–6	Veterans Memorial Arena; Jacksonville, FL
March 18, 2006; 3:20 pm, CBS	(3) No. 11	vs. (11) UW-Milwaukee; Second round	W 82–60	29–6	Veterans Memorial Arena; Jacksonville, FL
March 24, 2006; 9:40 pm, CBS	(3) No. 11	vs. (7) No. 23 Georgetown; Sweet Sixteen	W 57–53	30–6	Hubert H. Humphrey Metrodome; Minneapolis, MN
March 26, 2006; 5:05 pm, CBS	(3) No. 11	vs. (1) No. 3 Villanova; Elite Eight	W 75–62	31–6	Hubert H. Humphrey Metrodome; Minneapolis, MN
April 1, 2006; 6:05 pm, CBS	(3) No. 11	vs. (11) George Mason; Final Four	W 73–58	32–6	RCA Dome; Indianapolis, IN
April 3, 2006; 9:21 pm, CBS	(3) No. 11	vs. (2) No. 7 UCLA; National Championship Game	W 73–57	33–6	RCA Dome; Indianapolis, IN
*Non-conference game. ^{#}Rankings from AP Poll. (#) Tournament seedings in parentheses.

== Accomplishments ==
This was their first National Championship in school history.
