= 2005–06 Alabama Crimson Tide men's basketball team =

American college basketball season

2005–06 Alabama Crimson Tide men's basketball

NCAA tournament, second round
- Conference: Southeastern Conference
- Western Division
- Record: 18–13 (10–6 SEC)
- Head coach: Mark Gottfried (8th season)
- Assistant coaches: Philip Pearson; Eugene Harris; Tom Asbury
- Home arena: Coleman Coliseum (Capacity: 15,316)

2005–06 Southeastern Conference men's basketball standings
	Conf.				Overall
Team	W		L	PCT	W		L	PCT
East
No. 18 Tennessee	12	–	4	.750	22	–	8	.733
No. 11 Florida †	10	–	6	.625	33	–	6	.846
Kentucky	9	–	7	.563	22	–	13	.629
Vanderbilt	7	–	9	.438	17	–	13	.567
South Carolina	6	–	10	.375	23	–	15	.605
Georgia	5	–	11	.313	15	–	15	.500
West
No. 19 LSU	14	–	2	.875	27	–	9	.750
Alabama	10	–	6	.625	18	–	13	.581
Arkansas	10	–	6	.625	22	–	10	.688
Mississippi State	5	–	11	.313	15	–	15	.500
Auburn	4	–	12	.250	12	–	16	.429
Ole Miss	4	–	12	.250	14	–	16	.467
† 2006 SEC tournament winner Rankings from AP Poll

The 2005–06 Alabama Crimson Tide men's basketball team (variously "Alabama", "UA", "Bama" or "The Tide") represented the University of Alabama in the 2005–06 college basketball season. The head coach was Mark Gottfried, who was in his eight season at Alabama. The team played its home games at Coleman Coliseum in Tuscaloosa, Alabama and was a member of the Southeastern Conference. This was the 93rd season of basketball in the school's history. The Crimson Tide finished the season 18–13, 10–6 in SEC play, lost in the second round of the 2006 SEC men's basketball tournament. They were invited to the NCAA tournament and lost in the round of 32.

== Schedule and results ==
Date time, TV	Rank^{#}	Opponent^{#}	Result	Record	Site (attendance) city, state
Exhibition
November 9, 2005*; 7:15 p.m.		Spring Hill	W 85–64		Coleman Coliseum; Tuscaloosa, AL
Non-conference regular season
November 15, 2005*; 7:00 p.m.	No. 15	Miami (OH); NIT Season Tip-Off	W 64–58	1–0	Coleman Coliseum (7,816); Tuscaloosa, AL
November 17, 2005*; 9:00 p.m., ESPN2	No. 15	No. 12 Memphis; NIT Season Tip-Off	L 76–87	1–1	Coleman Coliseum (4,522); Tuscaloosa, AL
November 20, 2005*; 6:00 p.m.	No. 15	Alabama State	W 105–68	2–1	Coleman Coliseum (9,184); Tuscaloosa, AL
November 29, 2005*; 7:00 p.m.	No. 21	Louisiana Tech	W 73–63	3–1	Coleman Coliseum (7,773); Tuscaloosa, AL
December 3, 2005*; 7:00 p.m.	No. 21	Winthrop	W 60–57	4–1	Coleman Coliseum (8,481); Tuscaloosa, AL
December 7, 2005*; 6:00 p.m.	No. 22	Notre Dame	L 71–78	4–2	Coleman Coliseum (12,414); Tuscaloosa, AL
December 10, 2005*; 4:00 p.m.	No. 22	at Temple	L 58–68	4–3	Liacouras Center (4,352); Philadelphia, PA
December 17, 2005*; 7:00 p.m.		Georgia State	W 85–58	5–3	Coleman Coliseum (8,372); Tuscaloosa, AL
December 22, 2005*; 8:00 p.m.		No. 21 NC State	L 64–68	5–4	Coleman Coliseum (10,621); Tuscaloosa, AL
December 27, 2005*; 7:00 p.m.		Jackson State	W 101–66	6–4	Coleman Coliseum (9,451); Tuscaloosa, AL
December 31, 2005*; 3:30 p.m.		at No. 14 Oklahoma	L 56–68	6–5	Lloyd Noble Center (12,745); Norman, OK
January 2, 2005*; 7:30 p.m.		Birmingham–Southern	W 61–57	7–5	Coleman Coliseum (9,020); Tuscaloosa, AL
SEC regular season
January 7, 2006; 5:00 p.m.		Ole Miss	L 61–71	7–6 (0–1)	Coleman Coliseum (10,434); Tuscaloosa, AL
January 11, 2006; 7:00 p.m.		at Auburn; Iron Bowl of basketball	W 56–52	8–6 (1–1)	Beard-Eaves-Memorial Coliseum (10,500); Auburn, AL
January 14, 2006; 12:00 p.m., CBS		at Kentucky	W 68–64	9–6 (2–1)	Rupp Arena (23,471); Lexington, KY
January 18, 2006; 7:00 p.m.		Arkansas	W 78–75 ^{OT}	10–6 (3–1)	Coleman Coliseum (10,872); Tuscaloosa, AL
January 21, 2006; 2:00 p.m.		at LSU	L 57–68	10–7 (3–2)	Pete Maravich Assembly Center (10,231); Baton Rouge, Louisiana
January 28, 2006; 6:00 p.m.		Mississippi State	W 65–59	11–7 (4–2)	Coleman Coliseum (13,529); Tuscaloosa, AL
February 1, 2006; 6:30 p.m.		at Georgia	L 79–88	11–8 (4–3)	Stegeman Coliseum (5,572); Athens, GA
February 4, 2006; 12:00 p.m., JP Sports		No. 24 LSU	W 67–62	12–8 (5–3)	Coleman Coliseum (12,584); Tuscaloosa, AL
February 8, 2006; 7:00 p.m.		Vanderbilt	W 77–74 ^{OT}	13–8 (6–3)	Coleman Coliseum (10,108); Tuscaloosa, AL
February 11, 2006; 2:00 p.m.		at Ole Miss	L 64–50	14–8 (7–3)	Tad Smith Coliseum (5,096); Oxford, MS
February 14, 2006; 6:00 p.m.		at South Carolina	L 56–67	14–9 (7–4)	Colonial Life Arena (13,103); Columbia, SC
February 18, 2006; 3:00 p.m.		No. 8 Tennessee	W 92–79	15–9 (8–4)	Coleman Coliseum (15,194); Tuscaloosa, AL
February 21, 2006; 8:00 p.m., ESPN		at Arkansas	L 63–65	15–10 (8–5)	Bud Walton Arena (18,448); Fayetteville, Arkansas
February 26, 2006; 3:00 p.m., CBS		No. 12 Florida	W 82–77	16–10 (9–5)	Coleman Coliseum (15,335); Tuscaloosa, AL
March 1, 2006; 7:00 p.m.		Auburn; Iron Bowl of basketball	W 71–61	17–10 (10–5)	Coleman Coliseum (13,345); Tuscaloosa, AL
March 4, 2006; 4:00 p.m.		at Mississippi State	L 58–71	17–11 (10–6)	Humphrey Coliseum (9,111); Starkville, MS
SEC tournament
March 10, 2006; 2:00 p.m.	(W2)	vs. (E3) Kentucky; Second Round	L 61–68	17–12	Gaylord Entertainment Center (19,547); Nashville, TN
NCAA tournament
March 16, 2006*; 2:40 pm	(10)	vs. (7) Marquette; First round	W 90–85	18–12	Cox Arena (10,068); San Diego, CA
March 18, 2006*; 8:30 pm, CBS	(10)	(2) No. 7 UCLA; Second round	L 59–62	18–13	Cox Arena (10,687); San Diego, CA
*Non-conference game. ^{#}Rankings from AP Poll. (#) Tournament seedings in parentheses. All times are in Central Time.

== See also ==
- 2006 NCAA Division I men's basketball tournament
- 2005–06 NCAA Division I men's basketball season
- 2005–06 NCAA Division I men's basketball rankings
