= Mick Cronin (basketball) =

American basketball coach

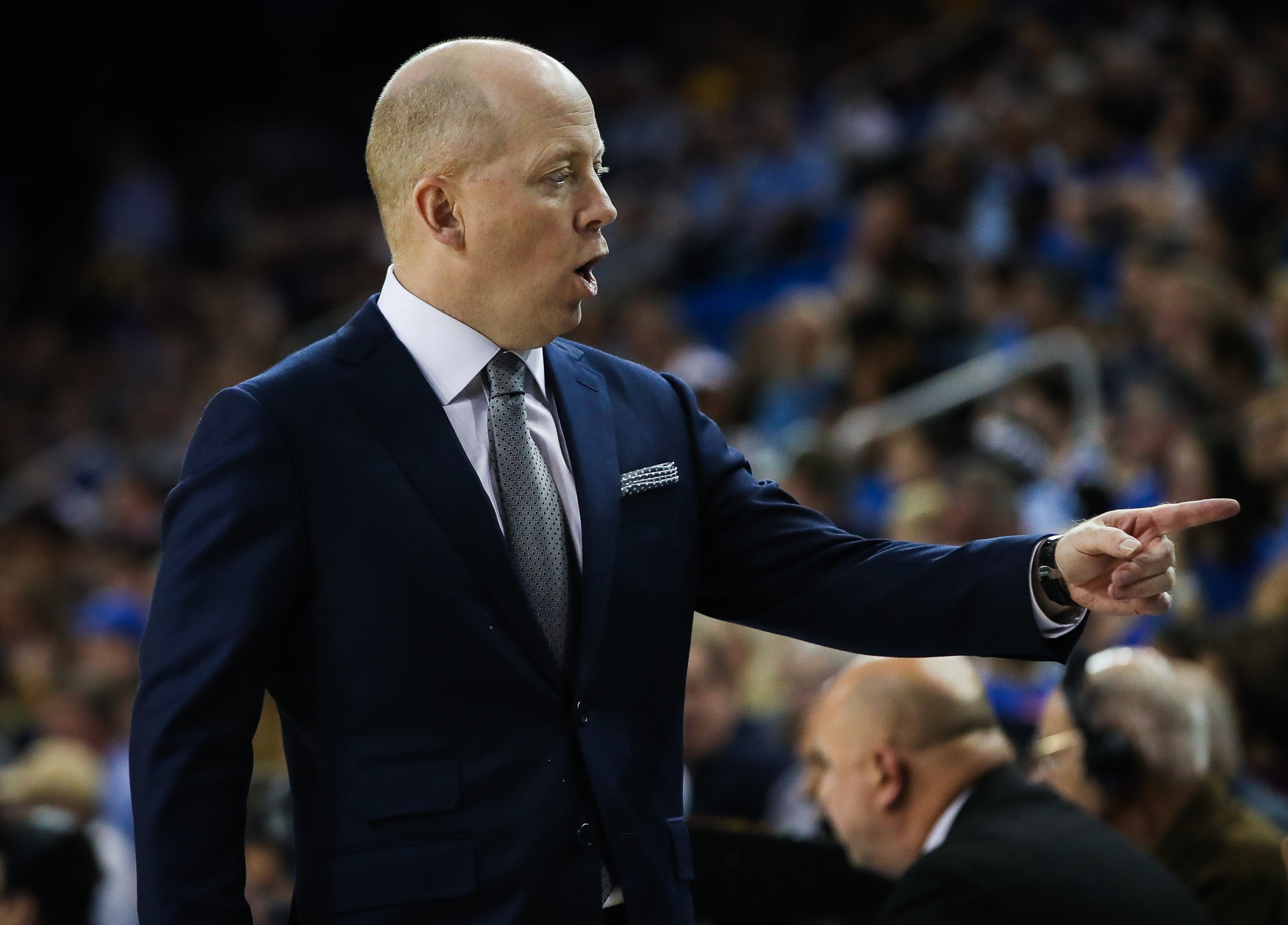
- Cronin with the UCLA Bruins in 2019

Current position
- Title: Head coach
- Team: UCLA
- Conference: Big Ten
- Record: 166–76 (.686)
- Annual salary: $4 million

Biographical details
- Born: July 17, 1971 (age 55); Cincinnati, Ohio, U.S.
- Education: Cincinnati ('96)

Coaching career (HC unless noted)
- 1991–1996: Woodward HS (assistant)
- 1996–2001: Cincinnati (assistant)
- 2001–2003: Louisville (assistant)
- 2003–2006: Murray State
- 2006–2019: Cincinnati
- 2019–present: UCLA

Head coaching record
- Overall: 531–247 (.683)
- Tournaments: 16–16 (NCAA Division I); 1–1 (NIT); 0–1 (CBI)

Accomplishments and honors

Championships
- NCAA Division I Regional—Final Four (2021); 2 OVC tournament (2004, 2006); OVC regular season (2006); 2 AAC tournament (2018, 2019); 2 AAC regular season (2014, 2018); Pac-12 regular season (2023)

Awards
- Sporting News Men's College Basketball Coach of the Year (2018); 2× Pac-12 Coach of the Year (2020, 2023); AAC Coach of the Year (2014); OVC Coach of the Year (2006)

Michael Walter Cronin (born July 17, 1971) is an American college basketball coach, currently the men's head basketball coach at UCLA. He was named the 2020 Pac-12 Coach of the Year in his first season. The following year, Cronin led them to the NCAA Final Four in 2021. He was previously the head coach at the University of Cincinnati from 2006 to 2019. Cronin was named the AAC Coach of the Year in 2014 and guided the program to nine straight NCAA tournament appearances. Prior to joining Cincinnati, he coached at Murray State University from 2003 to 2006.

== Early life ==
Cronin grew up on the west side of Cincinnati, the son of Peggy and Harold "Hep" Cronin. Hep Cronin was a high school coach with more than 400 career wins in Cincinnati. Mick was one of three children along with older brother, Dan, and sister, Kelly. Not only did his father coach basketball, he also was a teacher, a baseball scout for the Atlanta Braves, and an employee at River Downs race track during the summers.

Attending La Salle High School, the 5-foot-7-inch (1.70 m) Cronin, playing point guard for his dad, earned all-city honors in basketball at LaSalle. He led the city in assists and was second in 3-point shooting percentage during the 1989–90 season. A knee injury to his anterior cruciate ligament (ACL) near the end of his junior season ended his playing career.

As a student at the University of Cincinnati, while accompanying his dad to scout a Cincinnati Woodward High School game, Cronin was offered a job coaching the freshman team and assisting with the varsity by then-Bulldogs coach Jim Leon. From 1991 to 1996, he served as a varsity assistant coach and junior varsity coach at Woodward High. Cronin compiled a 57–3 record in three seasons as JV coach, and as a varsity aide, Woodward claimed three city championships. While at Woodward, Cronin helped develop six players who went on to play Division I college basketball, including former University of Louisville players Eric Johnson and Dion Edwards, and former Cincinnati guard Damon Flint.

Cronin received a Bachelor of Arts degree in history from the University of Cincinnati in 1996.

In the spring of 1996, Cronin coached the East team in the Magic Johnson Roundball Classic. He was director of the 1994 Pittsburgh high school Roundball Classic national all-star game. Cronin has coached and served on the selection committee for the Adidas camp and spent four summers on the staff of the Five-Star Teaching Camp.

== College coaching career ==
=== Early jobs ===
Cronin took his first college coaching job as a video coordinator under Bob Huggins at the University of Cincinnati in 1996–97, and the following season was elevated to assistant coach, a post he held at UC until 2001. Cronin built a reputation for his ability to evaluate and recruit top talent; at UC as an assistant for Huggins from 1997 to 2001, Cronin recruits included NBA draft selections Steve Logan (Golden State Warriors), DerMarr Johnson (Atlanta Hawks), Pete Mickeal and Kenny Satterfield (both drafted by the Dallas Mavericks), and Jason Maxiell (Detroit Pistons).

Cronin became the associate head coach and recruiting coordinator at Louisville under Rick Pitino, beginning with the 2001–02 season. In his first year, Cronin helped attract a top-10 ranked recruiting class.

=== Murray State ===
Cronin's first head coaching job was at Murray State, where he was hired in 2003. In three seasons at Murray, Cronin led the team to the NCAA tournament twice and was named the 2006 Ohio Valley Conference coach of the year.

=== Cincinnati ===
After the 2005–06 season, he was hired as Cincinnati's coach, replacing interim coach Andy Kennedy after the dismissal of Bob Huggins. Cronin had to pick up the pieces from a depleted program after Huggins was asked to resign with no warning three months before the 2005 season, and a temporary coach was used for a season. Due to the school having done little to no recruiting for nearly a year, Cronin was forced to scrounge for players. He even had a couple players on the football team play, one being future NFL linebacker Connor Barwin.

Although Cronin's teams struggled early in his UC career, he improved the school's win total each of his first five seasons. From the beginning of the 2010 season to February 3, 2017, the Bearcats had amassed a 166–63 record, spent 45 weeks ranked in the AP Poll, and reached six straight NCAA tournaments, while picking up four tournament wins.

For the 2009–10 season, Cronin was able to successfully recruit Lance Stephenson, the all-time leading scorer in New York state high school basketball history who later had NBA stints with multiple teams. During his one season at Cincinnati, Stephenson was named the Big East Rookie of the Year.

Cronin is also the only UC coach to ever lead the Bearcats to a win over a higher seed in the NCAA tournament, when 6th-seeded Cincinnati defeated 3rd-seeded Florida State in 2012. It was the only season that the Bearcats advanced to the Sweet Sixteen under Cronin. In 2018–19, Cincinnati appeared in its ninth straight NCAA tournament, but was eliminated in the first round by Iowa.

In 2011, the University of Cincinnati board of trustees approved a contract extension for Cronin through 2017 with an average pay of $1.5 million a year. It included an increase in salary for his staff, as well as an increase in the basketball program budget. In 2016, the UC board of trustees approved a 2-year extension that would have taken Cronin through the 2022–23 season.

Cronin had long been pushing for either a new arena or a renovation of Fifth Third Arena in order for the Bearcats to remain competitive on a national scale. In March 2017, the University of Cincinnati began an $87 million renovation which was completed in the fall of 2018. Cronin said, "This building is about our future and is a testament to the commitment our university and donors have toward our programs."

=== UCLA ===
On April 9, 2019, Cronin was named the fourteenth head coach of the UCLA Bruins, replacing the fired Steve Alford. At the time, the 47-year old Cronin had the most NCAA Division I wins (365) of any active coach younger than 50. He was also one of only six coaches to have led their school to the NCAA tournament in each of the past nine seasons. (Note: The others were Mark Few (Gonzaga), Tom Izzo (Michigan State), Mike Krzyzewski (Duke), Bill Self (Kansas) and Roy Williams (North Carolina).) Cronin had coached against the Bruins three times. After Cincinnati lost to UCLA in the 2017 NCAA tournament, they defeated the Bruins in two consecutive regular-season matches by an average of 21.5 points. Its 29-point win in 2018–19 was part of a UCLA four-game losing streak which led up to Alford's midseason dismissal. In his first year in 2019–20, the Bruins started slowly at 8–9 before going 11–3 and finishing second in the Pac-12 at 12–6. Cronin was named the Pac-12 Coach of the Year. The Bruins earned a No. 2 seed and a first-round bye in the Pac-12 tournament. However, due to the COVID-19 pandemic, the conference tournament was cancelled before the Bruins' first scheduled game in the quarterfinals, and the NCAA tournament was called off as well.

In 2020–21, UCLA finished their regular season with a 17–8 record, 13–6 in the Pac-12. They lost their last three regular-season games in a row and lost their game against Oregon State in the Pac-12 tournament. They were selected to open in the First Four of the NCAA tournament. They defeated Michigan State in the First Four for the Bruins' first NCAA tournament win since 2017 and then went on to defeat BYU in a first-round game on their way to reaching the Sweet Sixteen. Cronin then led the Bruins to an overtime victory over No. 2 seeded Alabama, reaching the Elite Eight for the first time in his coaching career (and the first for UCLA since 2008). They defeated No. 1 seed Michigan to become the second First Four team to advance to the Final Four, the Bruins' first national semifinal since 2008. They faced Gonzaga, who was seeking to become the first undefeated national champion since Indiana in 1976. UCLA was a 14-point underdog, the largest Final Four point spread since the tournament expanded to 64 teams in 1985. The Bruins lost 93–90 in overtime after the Bulldogs' Jalen Suggs banked in a 40-foot (12 m) shot as time expired in the game, a match that featured 19 lead changes and 15 ties.

On March 17, 2022, Cronin's contract was extended for 6 years to the 2027–28 season. He led the 2021–22 team to the Sweet Sixteen of the 2022 NCAA tournament, the first time the Bruins had reached the regional semifinals in consecutive seasons since 2015. In 2022–23, they won their first Pac-12 regular season championship since 2012–13. He was again voted the Pac-12 Coach of the Year. A two-seed in the 2023 NCAA tournament, UCLA advanced to their third straight Sweet Sixteen. They were eliminated by Gonzaga for the second time in three years. The Bulldogs' Julian Strawther made a 35-foot (11 m) basket with six seconds remaining, and they held on for the win. In 2023–24, UCLA's roster had seven freshmen and eight newcomers overall, along with three sophomores. They were eliminated in the quarterfinals of the Pac-12 tournament, ending Cronin's streak of 12 consecutive NCAA tournament appearances.

== Personal life ==
Before accepting the UCLA job, Cronin was very active in the Cincinnati area. Cronin annually spoke with the Young Executive Group of the Catholic Inner-City Schools Education (CISE) Fund. The group raises money from area corporations to help give children from low-income urban settings the opportunity to attend Catholic schools.

Cronin resided in Anderson Township in the Cincinnati area with his daughter Samantha. He was married to Darlene Taylor until they divorced in 2009. Cronin's father, Hep, who lives with Mick's sister, Kelly, attended Bearcats games, frequently attended their practices and sometimes traveled with the team. Cronin's mother, Peggy, died of cancer in 2005. His brother, Dan, starred at Bethel College in basketball and baseball, and was drafted by the Atlanta Braves in 1988.

On December 22, 2014, during the 2014–2015 season, Cronin, 43, was diagnosed with an unruptured aneurysm detected when he underwent medical testing for unexplained headaches. On January 2, 2015, it was announced that, although doctors expected the condition to heal with rest and medication, Cronin would not coach the remainder of the season. However, Cronin said he felt great and that he would be able to continue to oversee the program and be involved in recruiting. On March 30, 2015, Cronin announced he had a clean bill of health and was cleared to return to full-time coaching duties following his diagnosis of an arterial dissection.

== Head coaching record ==
Record table
Season	Team	Overall	Conference	Standing	Postseason
Murray State Racers (Ohio Valley Conference) (2003–2006)
2003–04	Murray State	28–6	14–2	2nd	NCAA Division I Round of 64
2004–05	Murray State	17–11	11–5	T–2nd	
2005–06	Murray State	24–7	17–3	1st	NCAA Division I Round of 64
Murray State:		69–24 (.742)	42–10 (.808)		
Cincinnati Bearcats (Big East Conference) (2006–2013)
2006–07	Cincinnati	11–19	2–14	16th	
2007–08	Cincinnati	13–19	8–10	10th	CBI first round
2008–09	Cincinnati	18–14	8–10	T–9th	
2009–10	Cincinnati	19–16	7–11	T–11th	NIT second round
2010–11	Cincinnati	26–9	11–7	T–6th	NCAA Division I Round of 32
2011–12	Cincinnati	26–11	12–6	T–4th	NCAA Division I Sweet 16
2012–13	Cincinnati	22–12	9–9	T–9th	NCAA Division I Round of 64
Cincinnati Bearcats (American Athletic Conference) (2013–2019)
2013–14	Cincinnati	27–7	15–3	T–1st	NCAA Division I Round of 64
2014–15	Cincinnati	23–11*	13–5*	T–3rd	NCAA Division I Round of 32*
2015–16	Cincinnati	22–11	12–6	T–3rd	NCAA Division I Round of 64
2016–17	Cincinnati	30–6	16–2	2nd	NCAA Division I Round of 32
2017–18	Cincinnati	31–5	16–2	1st	NCAA Division I Round of 32
2018–19	Cincinnati	28–7	14–4	2nd	NCAA Division I Round of 64
Cincinnati:		296–147 (.668)	135–87 (.608)		
UCLA Bruins (Pac-12 Conference) (2019–2024)
2019–20	UCLA	19–12	12–6	2nd	No postseason held
2020–21	UCLA	22–10	13–6	4th	NCAA Division I Final Four
2021–22	UCLA	27–8	15–5	2nd	NCAA Division I Sweet 16
2022–23	UCLA	31–6	18–2	1st	NCAA Division I Sweet 16
2023–24	UCLA	16–17	10–10	5th	
UCLA Bruins (Big Ten Conference) (2024–present)
2024–25	UCLA	23–11	13–7	T–4th	NCAA Division I Round of 32
2025–26	UCLA	24–12	13–7	T–6th	NCAA Division I Round of 32
2026–27	UCLA	4–0	0–0		
UCLA:		166–76 (.686)	94–43 (.686)		
Total:		531–247 (.683)			
National champion Postseason invitational champion Conference regular season champion Conference regular season and conference tournament champion Division regular season champion Division regular season and conference tournament champion Conference tournament champion

* ^^{a} ^{b} ^{c} Cronin missed a portion of the 2014–15 season due to an illness, having only coached for the first nine games. Cronin was credited with both the wins and the losses for that season, based on a decision by athletic director Mike Bohn after school officials sought a ruling on the issue from the NCAA and were told that it was up to the school.
