= 2005–06 LSU Tigers basketball team =

American college basketball season

2005–06 LSU Tigers basketball

SEC regular season champions

NCAA tournament, Final Four
- Conference: Southeastern Conference

Ranking
- Coaches: No. 3
- AP: No. 19
- Record: 27–9 (14–2 SEC)
- Head coach: John Brady (9th season)
- Home arena: Pete Maravich Assembly Center

2005–06 Southeastern Conference men's basketball standings
	Conf.				Overall
Team	W		L	PCT	W		L	PCT
East
No. 18 Tennessee	12	–	4	.750	22	–	8	.733
No. 11 Florida †	10	–	6	.625	33	–	6	.846
Kentucky	9	–	7	.563	22	–	13	.629
Vanderbilt	7	–	9	.438	17	–	13	.567
South Carolina	6	–	10	.375	23	–	15	.605
Georgia	5	–	11	.313	15	–	15	.500
West
No. 19 LSU	14	–	2	.875	27	–	9	.750
Alabama	10	–	6	.625	18	–	13	.581
Arkansas	10	–	6	.625	22	–	10	.688
Mississippi State	5	–	11	.313	15	–	15	.500
Auburn	4	–	12	.250	12	–	16	.429
Ole Miss	4	–	12	.250	14	–	16	.467
† 2006 SEC tournament winner Rankings from AP Poll

The 2005–06 LSU Tigers basketball team represented Louisiana State University in the Southeastern Conference (SEC) during the 2005–06 NCAA Division I men's basketball season. The team was coached by John Brady and played their home games at Pete Maravich Assembly Center in Baton Rouge, Louisiana.

== Recruiting class ==
College recruiting information
Name	Hometown	School	Height	Weight	Commit date
Alex Farrer; SG	Phoenix, Arizona	St. Mary's High School	6 ft 5 in (1.96 m)	215 lb (98 kg)	May 26, 2005
Alex Farrer; SG	Recruit ratings: Scout: Rivals:				
Chris Johnson; SF	Laurinburg, North Carolina	Laurinburg Prep School	6 ft 10 in (2.08 m)	205 lb (93 kg)	Aug 13, 2004
Chris Johnson; SF	Recruit ratings: Scout: Rivals:				
Tasmin Mitchell; SF	Denham Springs, Louisiana	Denham Springs High School	6 ft 7 in (2.01 m)	235 lb (107 kg)	Sep 1, 2004
Tasmin Mitchell; SF	Recruit ratings: Scout: Rivals:				
Magnum Rolle; PF	Laurinburg, North Carolina	Laurinburg Prep School	6 ft 11 in (2.11 m)	200 lb (91 kg)	Sep 1, 2004
Magnum Rolle; PF	Recruit ratings: Scout: Rivals:				
Ben Voogd; PG	Florence, Oregon	Siuslaw High School	6 ft 1 in (1.85 m)	175 lb (79 kg)	Sep 27, 2004
Ben Voogd; PG	Recruit ratings: Scout: Rivals:				
Overall recruit ranking: Scout: 8 Rivals: 15
Note: In many cases, Scout, Rivals, 247Sports, On3, and ESPN may conflict in their listings of height and weight.; In these cases, the average was taken. ESPN grades are on a 100-point scale.; Sources: "LSU Commit List for 2005". Rivals.; "Men's Basketball Recruiting". Scout.; "College Basketball Recruiting Schools". ESPN.; "Scout.com Team Recruiting Rankings". Scout.; "2005 Team Ranking". Rivals.

== Roster ==
2005–06 LSU Tigers men's basketball team
Players
Coaches

Pos.	#	Name	Height	Weight	Year	Hometown
F	0	Glen Davis	6 ft 9 in (2.06 m)	310 lb (141 kg)	So	Baton Rouge, Louisiana
G	30	Alex Farrer	6 ft 5 in (1.96 m)	200 lb (91 kg)	Fr	Phoenix, Arizona
G	10	David Fleshman	6 ft 0 in (1.83 m)	180 lb (82 kg)	So	Baton Rouge, Louisiana
F	35	Darnell Lazare	6 ft 8 in (2.03 m)	229 lb (104 kg)	Jr	Baton Rouge, Louisiana
G	2	Dameon Mason	6 ft 5 in (1.96 m)	190 lb (86 kg)	Jr	Aurora, Illinois
G	3	Tack Minor	5 ft 11 in (1.8 m)	200 lb (91 kg)	Jr	Houston, Texas
G	22	Darrel Mitchell	5 ft 11 in (1.8 m)	176 lb (80 kg)	So	Saint Martinville, Louisiana
F	1	Tasmin Mitchell	6 ft 7 in (2.01 m)	235 lb (107 kg)	Fr	Denham Springs, Louisiana
F	15	Magnum Rolle	6 ft 10 in (2.08 m)	200 lb (91 kg)	Fr	Laurinburg, North Carolina
G	14	Garrett Temple	6 ft 5 in (1.96 m)	180 lb (82 kg)	Fr	Baton Rouge, Louisiana
F	12	Tyrus Thomas	6 ft 7 in (2.01 m)	200 lb (91 kg)	Fr	Baton Rouge, Louisiana
G	4	Ben Voogd	6 ft 1 in (1.85 m)	180 lb (82 kg)	Fr	Florence, Oregon
C	21	Chris Johnson	6 ft 11 in (2.11 m)	210 lb (95 kg)	Fr	Laurinburg, North Carolina

Head coach

- John Brady (Belhaven)

Assistant coach(es)

- Nikita Johnson (West Georgia)
- Butch Pierre (Mississippi State)
- John Treloar (Belhaven)

Legend

- (C) Team captain
- (S) Suspended
- (I) Ineligible
- (W) Walk-on
- Injured
- Current redshirt

Roster
Last update: 2022-05-02

== Schedule ==
Date time, TV	Rank^{#}	Opponent^{#}	Result	Record	Site (attendance) city, state
Regular season
2005/11/18*; 7:00 p.m.		Southern	W 84–56	1–0	Maravich Center (7,877); Baton Rouge, Louisiana
2005/11/21*; 7:00 p.m.		Nicholls State	W 104–57	2–0	Maravich Center (7,427); Baton Rouge, Louisiana
2005/11/26*; 3:45 p.m., ESPN+		at No. 13 West Virginia	W 71–68 ^{OT}	3–0	WVU Coliseum (11,044); Morgantown, West Virginia
2005/11/29*; 8:00 p.m., FSN	No. 25	Houston	L 83–84	3–1	Maravich Center (8,790); Baton Rouge, Louisiana
2005/12/10*; 7:00 p.m., CST		McNeese State	W 90–70	4–1	Maravich Center (8,196); Baton Rouge, Louisiana
2005/12/13*; 7:00 p.m., CST		New Orleans	W 94–53	5–1	Maravich Center (6,567); Baton Rouge, Louisiana
2005/12/17*; 7:00 p.m., CST		Louisiana-Lafayette	W 81–62	6–1	Maravich Center (8,764); Baton Rouge, Louisiana
2005/12/19*; 7:00 p.m., CST		Northern Iowa; Las Vegas Holiday Classic	L 50–54	6–2	Maravich Center (7,340); Baton Rouge, Louisiana
2005/12/22*; 7:00 p.m.		vs. Arkansas-Monticello	W 75–48	7–2	Valley High (1,200); Las Vegas, NV
2005/12/23*; 9:30 p.m.		vs. Cincinnati	L 72–75	7–3	Valley High (1,200); Las Vegas, Nevada
2005/12/31*; 12:00 p.m., ESPNU		at No. 21 Ohio State	L 76–78	7–4	Value City Arena (16,136); Columbus, Ohio
2006/01/03*; 7:00 p.m., CST		Tulane	W 75–58	8–4	Maravich Center (7,365); Baton Rouge, Louisiana
2006/01/07*; 7:00 p.m., CBS		at No. 2 Connecticut	L 66–67	8–5	Hartford Civic Center (16,294); Hartford, Connecticut
2006/1/11; 7:00 p.m.		at Arkansas	W 63–58	9–5 (1–0)	Bud Walton Arena (18,689); Fayetteville, Arkansas
2006/01/14; 7:00 p.m., FSN		Tennessee	W 88–74	10–5 (2–0)	Maravich Center (9,733); Baton Rouge, Louisiana
2006/1/18; 7:00 p.m.		at Mississippi State	W 71–57	11–5 (3–0)	Humphrey Coliseum (10,150); Starkville, Mississippi
2006/1/21; 2:00 p.m., JP Sports		Alabama	W 68–57	12–5 (4–0)	Maravich Center (11,674); Baton Rouge, Louisiana
2006/1/25; 7:00 p.m.		Georgia	W 81–52	13–5 (5–0)	Maravich Center (13,468); Baton Rouge, Louisiana
2006/1/28; 2:00 p.m.		at Mississippi	W 79–73	14–5 (6–0)	Tad Smith Coliseum (7,805); Oxford, Mississippi
2006/2/1; 7:00 p.m.	No. 24	Auburn	W 84–69	15–5 (7–0)	Maravich Center (11,131); Baton Rouge, Louisiana
2006/2/4; 12:00 p.m., JP Sports	No. 24	at Alabama	L 62–67	15–6 (7–1)	Coleman Coliseum (12,584); Tuscaloosa, AL
2006/2/8; 7:00 p.m., JP Sports		Arkansas	W 78–77	16–6 (8–1)	Maravich Center (9,820); Baton Rouge, Louisiana
2006/2/11; 12:00 p.m., JP Sports		at No. 7 Florida	L 62–71	16–7 (8–2)	O'Connell Center (12,004); Gainesville, Florida
2006/2/15; 7:00 p.m., JP Sports	No. 25	Mississippi State	W 72–59	17–7 (9–2)	Maravich Center (9,264); Baton Rouge, Louisiana
2006/2/18; 5:00 p.m., FSN	No. 25	at Auburn	W 65–61	18–7 (10–2)	Beard-Eaves-Memorial Coliseum (6,711); Auburn, AL
2006/2/22; 7:00 p.m.	No. 24	at Vanderbilt	W 77–66	19–7 (11–2)	Memorial Gymnasium (13,122); Nashville, Tennessee
2006/2/25; 2:45 p.m., CBS	No. 24	Kentucky	W 71–67	20–7 (12–2)	Maravich Center (11,576); Baton Rouge, Louisiana
2006/2/28; 6:00 p.m., ESPN	No. 21	at South Carolina	W 64–61	21–7 (13–2)	Colonial Center (12,248); Columbia, South Carolina
2006/3/4; 3:00 p.m., JP Sports	No. 21	Mississippi	W 55–52	22–7 (14–2)	Maravich Center (12,507); Baton Rouge, Louisiana
SEC Tournament
2006/03/10; 6:30 p.m., JP Sports	No. 18	vs. Vanderbilt; SEC Conference tournament	W 92–73	23–7	Gaylord Entertainment Center (17,777); Nashville, Tennessee
2006/03/11; 2:15 p.m., JP Sports	No. 18	vs. No. 16 Florida; SEC Conference tournament	L 65–81	23–8	Gaylord Entertainment Center (19,206); Nashville, Tennessee
NCAA Tournament
2006/03/16; 6:10 p.m., CBS	(4) No. 19	vs. (13) Iona; First Round	W 80–64	24–8	Jacksonville Veterans Memorial Arena (13,777); Jacksonville, Florida
2006/03/18; 4:50 p.m., CBS	(4) No. 19	vs. (12) Texas A&M; Second Round	W 58–57	25–8	Jacksonville Veterans Memorial Arena (13,777); Jacksonville, Florida
2006/03/23; 6:10 p.m., CBS	(4) No. 19	vs. (1) No. 1 Duke; Sweet Sixteen	W 62–54	26–8	Georgia Dome (27,130); Atlanta
2006/03/25; 3:40 p.m., CBS	(4) No. 19	vs. (2) No. 9 Texas; Elite Eight	W 70–60 ^{OT}	27–8	Georgia Dome (27,130); Atlanta
2006/4/1; 7:47 p.m., CBS	(4) No. 19	vs. (2) No. 7 UCLA; Final Four	L 45–59	27–9	RCA Dome (43,822); Indianapolis
*Non-conference game. ^{#}Rankings from AP poll, NCAA tournament seeds shown in parentheses. (#) Tournament seedings in parentheses. All times are in Central Standard Time.

== Rankings ==
Ranking movements Legend: ██ Increase in ranking ██ Decrease in ranking — = Not ranked RV = Received votes т = Tied with team above or below
	Week																			
Poll	Pre	1	2	3	4	5	6	7	8	9	10	11	12	13	14	15	16	17	18	Final
AP	—	—	RV	25	—	—	—	—	—	—	—	—	24	—	25	24	21	17 т	19	Not released
Coaches	—	—^	—	25	—	—	—	—	—	—	—	—	—	—	25	24	21	17	18	3

*AP does not release post-NCAA Tournament rankings
^Coaches did not release a Week 2 poll.

== NBA draft ==
Round	Pick	Player	NBA club
1	4	Tyrus Thomas	Portland Trail Blazers
