= 2005–06 Western Kentucky Hilltoppers basketball team =

American college basketball season

2005–06 Western Kentucky Hilltoppers basketball

Sun Belt Conference East Division Champion

NIT Tournament, First Round
- Conference: Sun Belt Conference
- East Division
- Record: 23–8 (12–2 Sun Belt)
- Head coach: Darrin Horn
- Assistant coach: Paul Sanderford
- Home arena: E. A. Diddle Arena

2005–06 Sun Belt Conference men's basketball standings
	Conf.				Overall
Team	W		L	PCT	W		L	PCT
East
Western Kentucky	12	–	2	.857	23	–	8	.742
Middle Tennessee	8	–	6	.571	16	–	12	.571
Arkansas State	7	–	7	.500	12	–	18	.400
Arkansas-Little Rock	5	–	9	.357	14	–	15	.483
Florida International	4	–	10	.286	8	–	20	.286
West
South Alabama †	12	–	3	.800	24	–	7	.774
Louisiana–Lafayette	7	–	8	.467	13	–	16	.448
Denver	7	–	8	.467	15	–	16	.484
New Orleans	6	–	9	.400	10	–	19	.345
North Texas	6	–	9	.400	14	–	14	.500
Troy	6	–	9	.400	14	–	15	.483
† 2006 Sun Belt Conference tournament winner Rankings from AP Poll

The 2005–06 Western Kentucky Hilltoppers men's basketball team represented Western Kentucky University during the 2005–06 NCAA Division I men's basketball season. The Hilltoppers were led by head coach Darrin Horn and Sun Belt Conference Player of the Year Anthony Winchester. The team won the East Division Championship and finished 2nd in the Sun Belt Basketball tournament. They participated in the National Invitation Tournament where they were defeated by eventual champion, South Carolina. Winchester and future NBA player Courtney Lee were named to the All SBC team. Elgrace Wilborn and Winchester made the SBC All-Tournament team.

== Schedule ==
Date time, TV	Rank^{#}	Opponent^{#}	Result	Record	Site city, state
Regular season
11/18/2005*		Austin Peay	W 83–54	1–0	E. A. Diddle Arena (6,210); Bowling Green, KY
11/22/2005*		IUPUI	W 89–75	2–0	E. A. Diddle Arena (4,467); Bowling Green, KY
11/26/2005*		Georgia	L 65–69	2–1	E. A. Diddle Arena (7,336); Bowling Green, KY
11/29/2005*		at UAB	W 92–76	3–1	Bartow Arena (3,835); Birmingham, AL
12/3/2005*		at Eastern Kentucky	W 97–89	4–1	Alumni Coliseum (6,250); Richmond, VA
12/6/2005*		Evansville	W 84–77	5–1	E. A. Diddle Arena (5,293); Bowling Green, KY
12/10/2005*		Pacific	L 75–91	5–2	E. A. Diddle Arena (5,047); Bowling Green, KY
12/14/2005*		at Bradley	L 76–78	5–3	Carver Arena (7,514); Peoria, IL
12/19/2005*		vs. Central Florida; Fiesta Bowl Classic	W 73–68	6–3	McKale Center (14,577); Tucson, AZ
12/21/2005*		vs. No. 11 Arizona; Fiesta Bowl Classic	L 81–86 ^{OT}	6–4	McKale Center (14,589); Tucson, AZ
12/29/2005*		Kentucky State	W 87–71	7–4	E. A. Diddle Arena (4,597); Bowling Green, KY
01/2/2006*		Virginia	W 78–68	8–4	E. A. Diddle Arena (4,981); Bowling Green, KY
01/5/2006		at Arkansas State	W 72–70	9–4 (1-0)	Convocation Center (3,239); Jonesboro, AR
01/7/2006		Middle Tennessee	W 80–48	10–4 (2-0)	E. A. Diddle Arena (5,979); Bowling Green, KY
1/12/2006		Arkansas–Little Rock	W 74–70	11–4 (3-0)	E. A. Diddle Arena (4,085); Bowling Green, KY
01/14/2006		Arkansas State	W 87–63	12–4 (4-0)	E. A. Diddle Arena (5,111); Bowling Green, KY
1/19/2006		at Troy	L 49–76	12–5 (4-1)	Sartain Hall (3,048); Troy, AL
1/21/2006		at South Alabama	W 74–73	13–5 (5-1)	Mitchell Center (5,291); Mobile, AL
01/26/2006		Louisiana–Lafayette	W 94–81	14–5 (6-1)	E. A. Diddle Arena (7,326); Bowling Green, KY
01/28/2006		New Orleans	W 72–57	15–5 (7-1)	E. A. Diddle Arena (5,372); Bowling Green, KY
1/31/2006		at FIU	W 66–61	16–5 (8-1)	Ocean Bank Convocation Center (1,103); University Park, FL
02/9/2006		at Denver	W 71–70	17–5 (9-1)	Magness Arena (1,401); Denver, CO
02/11/2006		North Texas	W 97–71	18–5 (10-1)	E. A. Diddle Arena (5,505); Bowling Green, KY
2/16/2006		at Arkansas–Little Rock	W 74–73	19–5 (11-1)	Jack Stephens Center (3,125); Little Rock, AR
02/18/2006*		Northern Arizona; Bracket Buster	W 79–58	20–5	E. A. Diddle Arena (7,326); Bowling Green, KY
02/23/2006		at Middle Tennessee	L 74–80	20–6 (11-2)	Murphy Center (7,097); Murfreesboro, TN
02/25/2006		FIU	W 80–65	21–6 (12-2)	E. A. Diddle Arena (7,326); Bowling Green, KY
2006 Sun Belt Conference men's basketball tournament
03/05/2006	(1E)	vs. (4W) New Orleans; Second Round	W 80–61	22–6	Murphy Center (3,977); Murfreesboro, TN
03/6/2006	(1E)	vs. (2W) Louisiana–Lafayette; Semifinals	W 80–72	23–6	Murphy Center (2,349); Murfreesboro, TN
03/7/2006	(1E)	vs. (1W) South Alabama; Championship Game	L 70–95	23–7	Murphy Center (5,007); Murfreesboro, TN
2006 National Invitation Tournament
03/15/2006*	(6 C)	at (3 C) South Carolina; First Round	L 55–74	23–8	Colonial Life Arena (4,732); Columbia, SC
*Non-conference game. ^{#}Rankings from AP Poll (C) during NIT Tournament is seed with Region. (#) Tournament seedings in parentheses.
