= 2005–06 South Alabama Jaguars basketball team =

American college basketball season

2005–06 South Alabama Jaguars men's basketball

Sun Belt tournament champions Sun Belt West division champions

NCAA tournament, first round
- Conference: Sun Belt Conference
- West Division
- Record: 24–7 (12–3 Sun Belt)
- Head coach: John Pelphrey (4th season)
- Assistant coaches: Isaac Brown; David Farrar; Matt Figger
- Home arena: Mitchell Center

2005–06 Sun Belt Conference men's basketball standings
	Conf.				Overall
Team	W		L	PCT	W		L	PCT
East
Western Kentucky	12	–	2	.857	23	–	8	.742
Middle Tennessee	8	–	6	.571	16	–	12	.571
Arkansas State	7	–	7	.500	12	–	18	.400
Arkansas-Little Rock	5	–	9	.357	14	–	15	.483
Florida International	4	–	10	.286	8	–	20	.286
West
South Alabama †	12	–	3	.800	24	–	7	.774
Louisiana–Lafayette	7	–	8	.467	13	–	16	.448
Denver	7	–	8	.467	15	–	16	.484
New Orleans	6	–	9	.400	10	–	19	.345
North Texas	6	–	9	.400	14	–	14	.500
Troy	6	–	9	.400	14	–	15	.483
† 2006 Sun Belt Conference tournament winner Rankings from AP Poll

The 2005–06 South Alabama Jaguars basketball team represented the University of South Alabama during the 2005–06 NCAA Division I men's basketball season. The Jaguars were led by head coach John Pelphrey, in his fourth season as head coach. They played their home games at the Mitchell Center, and were members of the Sun Belt Conference. They finished the season 24–7, 12–3 in Sun Belt play to finish in first place. They won the Sun Belt tournament to secure the conference's automatic bid to the 2006 NCAA tournament as No. 14 seed in the Minneapolis region. In the opening round, the Jaguars lost to No. 3 seed and eventual National champion Florida.

== Roster ==
2005–06 South Alabama Jaguars men's basketball team
Players
Coaches

Pos.	#	Name	Height	Weight	Year	Hometown
F	1	Michael Phillips	6 ft 6 in (1.98 m)	215 lb (98 kg)	Sr	Mobile, Alabama
G	2	Mario Jointer	6 ft 3 in (1.91 m)	195 lb (88 kg)	Sr	Jackson, Mississippi
G	3	Chey Christie	6 ft 4 in (1.93 m)	185 lb (84 kg)	Sr	Hartford, Connecticut
G	4	Jeffrey Collins	6 ft 4 in (1.93 m)	185 lb (84 kg)	Sr	Birmingham, Alabama
G	10	Demetric Bennett	6 ft 5 in (1.96 m)	205 lb (93 kg)	So	Albany, Georgia
G	11	Carlos Smith	6 ft 0 in (1.83 m)	180 lb (82 kg)	Jr	College Park, Georgia
F	13	Leandro Buboltz	6 ft 7 in (2.01 m)	225 lb (102 kg)	Jr	Santa Cruz do Sul, Brazil
G	14	Steven Cowherd	6 ft 1 in (1.85 m)	185 lb (84 kg)	Jr	Coral Springs, Florida
F	21	Trajinski Grigsby	6 ft 6 in (1.98 m)	215 lb (98 kg)	Fr	Nacogdoches, Texas
F	33	Jason McGriff	6 ft 9 in (2.06 m)	230 lb (104 kg)	Fr	Palm Bay, Florida
F	35	Richard Law	6 ft 6 in (1.98 m)	220 lb (100 kg)	Sr	Houston, Texas

Head coach

- John Pelphrey (Kentucky)

Assistant coach(es)

- Isaac Brown (Louisiana–Monroe)
- David Farrar (Anderson (IN))
- Matt Figger (Eastern Kentucky)

Legend

- (C) Team captain
- (S) Suspended
- (I) Ineligible
- (W) Walk-on
- Injured
- Current redshirt

== Schedule and results ==
Date time, TV	Rank^{#}	Opponent^{#}	Result	Record	Site (attendance) city, state
Non-conference regular season
Nov 18, 2005*; 7:05 p.m.		Spring Hill	W 84–46	1–0	Mitchell Center (1,961); Mobile, Alabama
Nov 22, 2005*; 7:00 p.m.		at Purdue	L 67–85	1–1	Mackey Arena (10,048); West Lafayette, Indiana
Nov 25, 2005*; 7:05 p.m.		Alabama A&M	W 84–46	2–1	Mitchell Center (1,899); Mobile, Alabama
Nov 28, 2005*; 7:05 p.m.		at Loyola Marymount	W 81–80 ^{OT}	3–1	Gersten Pavilion (1,056); Los Angeles, California
Dec 3, 2005*; 7:35 p.m.		Samford	W 55–52	4–1	Mitchell Center (2,178); Mobile, Alabama
Dec 10, 2005*; 4:00 p.m.		at Southern Miss	W 75–51	5–1	Reed Green Coliseum (3,187); Hattiesburg, Mississippi
Dec 14, 2005*; 7:00 p.m.		at Louisiana–Monroe	W 81–71	6–1	Fant–Ewing Coliseum (681); Monroe, Louisiana
Dec 17, 2005*; 5:00 p.m.		No. 25 Houston; Coors Classic	W 66–62	7–1	Mitchell Center (5,688); Mobile, Alabama
Dec 20, 2005*; 7:05 p.m.		Louisiana–Monroe	W 83–64	8–1	Mitchell Center (2,103); Mobile, Alabama
Dec 22, 2005*; 7:00 p.m.		at Alabama State	L 75–78	8–2	Dunn–Oliver Acadome (1,328); Montgomery, Alabama
Dec 30, 2005*; 8:30 p.m.		Western Michigan	W 81–59	9–2	Mitchell Center (2,967); Mobile, Alabama
Jan 4, 2006*; 7:00 p.m.		at Tennessee	L 69–87	9–3	Thompson-Boling Arena (11,248); Knoxville, Tennessee
Sun Belt Regular Season
Jan 7, 2006; 7:05 p.m.		Troy	W 88–84	10–3 (1–0)	Mitchell Center (3,707); Mobile, Alabama
Jan 12, 2006; 7:05 p.m.		at Louisiana–Lafayette	W 61–51	11–3 (2–0)	Cajundome (3,648); Lafayette, Louisiana
Jan 14, 2006; 7:00 p.m.		at New Orleans	W 60–57	12–3 (3–0)	Human Performance Center (483); New Orleans, Louisiana
Jan 19, 2006; 7:30 p.m.		Middle Tennessee	W 75–63	13–3 (4–0)	Mitchell Center (2,266); Mobile, Alabama
Jan 21, 2006; 7:05 p.m.		Western Kentucky	L 73–74	13–4 (4–1)	Mitchell Center (5,291); Mobile, Alabama
Jan 26, 2006; 7:00 p.m.		at Denver	L 60–69	13–5 (4–2)	Magness Arena (1,789); Denver, Colorado
Jan 28, 2006; 7:00 p.m.		at North Texas	W 89–67	14–5 (5–2)	Super Pit (4,954); Denton, Texas
Feb 2, 2006; 8:00 p.m.		at Little Rock	W 65–58	15–5 (6–2)	Jack Stephens Center (3,115); Little Rock, Arkansas
Feb 4, 2006; 7:30 p.m.		Arkansas State	W 78–69	16–5 (7–2)	Mitchell Center (4,317); Mobile, Alabama
Feb 9, 2006; 7:05 p.m.		Louisiana–Lafayette	L 53–59	16–6 (7–3)	Mitchell Center (2,396); Mobile, Alabama
Feb 13, 2006; 7:05 p.m.		New Orleans	W 81–71	17–6 (8–3)	Mitchell Center (2,231); Mobile, Alabama
Feb 16, 2006; 7:00 p.m.		at Troy	W 66–52	18–6 (9–3)	Sartain Hall (3,034); Troy, Alabama
Feb 20, 2006; 7:00 p.m.		at Florida International	W 64–51	19–6 (10–3)	Ocean Bank Convocation Center (711); Westchester, Florida
Feb 23, 2006; 9:07 p.m.		Denver	W 74–65	20–6 (11–3)	Mitchell Center (2,989); Mobile, Alabama
Feb 25, 2006; 8:20 p.m.		North Texas	W 99–79	21–6 (12–3)	Mitchell Center (3,695); Mobile, Alabama
Sun Belt Conference tournament
Mar 5, 2006*; 6:00 p.m.		vs. Little Rock; Quarterfinals	W 78–53	22–6	Murphy Center (1,009); Murfreesboro, Tennessee
Mar 6, 2006*; 5:30 p.m.		vs. Denver; Semifinals	W 75–65	23–6	Murphy Center (2,147); Murfreesboro, Tennessee
Mar 7, 2006*; 8:30 p.m.		vs. Western Kentucky; Championship game	W 95–70	24–6	Murphy Center (5,007); Murfreesboro, Tennessee
NCAA tournament
Mar 16, 2006*; 3:15 p.m.	(14 MSP)	vs. (3 MSP) No. 11 Florida; First round	L 50–76	24–7	Jacksonville Veteran's Memorial Coliseum (13,777); Jacksonville, Florida
*Non-conference game. ^{#}Rankings from AP Poll. (#) Tournament seedings in parentheses. MSP=Minneapolis. All times are in Central Time.
