= 2005–06 Tennessee Volunteers basketball team =

American college basketball season

2005–06 Tennessee Volunteers basketball

SEC East regular season champions

NCAA tournament, second round
- Conference: Southeastern Conference
- East

Ranking
- Coaches: No. 20
- AP: No. 18
- Record: 22–8 (12–4 SEC)
- Head coach: Bruce Pearl (1st season)
- Assistant coaches: Tony Jones; Steve Forbes; Jason Shay
- Home arena: Thompson–Boling Arena

2005–06 Southeastern Conference men's basketball standings
	Conf.				Overall
Team	W		L	PCT	W		L	PCT
East
No. 18 Tennessee	12	–	4	.750	22	–	8	.733
No. 11 Florida †	10	–	6	.625	33	–	6	.846
Kentucky	9	–	7	.563	22	–	13	.629
Vanderbilt	7	–	9	.438	17	–	13	.567
South Carolina	6	–	10	.375	23	–	15	.605
Georgia	5	–	11	.313	15	–	15	.500
West
No. 19 LSU	14	–	2	.875	27	–	9	.750
Alabama	10	–	6	.625	18	–	13	.581
Arkansas	10	–	6	.625	22	–	10	.688
Mississippi State	5	–	11	.313	15	–	15	.500
Auburn	4	–	12	.250	12	–	16	.429
Ole Miss	4	–	12	.250	14	–	16	.467
† 2006 SEC tournament winner Rankings from AP Poll

The 2005–06 Tennessee Volunteers basketball team represented the University of Tennessee as a member of the Southeastern Conference during the 2005–06 NCAA Division I men's basketball season. Led by first-year head coach Bruce Pearl, the Volunteers played their home games at Thompson–Boling Arena in Knoxville, Tennessee. Tennessee finished on top of the SEC East division standings, but were knocked out of the SEC Tournament in the quarterfinal round. After receiving an at-large bid to the NCAA Tournament as the No. 2 seed in the East region, Tennessee slid past Winthrop in the opening round before losing to No. 7 seed Wichita State in the second round. The team finished the season with a 22–8 record (12–4 SEC).

== Roster ==
2005–06 Tennessee Volunteers men's basketball team
Players
Coaches

Pos.	#	Name	Height	Weight	Year	Hometown
C	1	Major Wingate	6 ft 10 in (2.08 m)	250 lb (113 kg)	Jr	Florence, South Carolina
G	2	JaJuan Smith	6 ft 2 in (1.88 m)	195 lb (88 kg)	So	Cleveland, Tennessee
G	5	Chris Lofton	6 ft 2 in (1.88 m)	200 lb (91 kg)	So	Maysville, Kentucky
F	22	Andre Patterson	6 ft 7 in (2.01 m)	217 lb (98 kg)	Sr	Los Angeles, California
G	23	Dane Bradshaw	6 ft 4 in (1.93 m)	205 lb (93 kg)	Jr	Memphis, Tennessee
G	32	C. J. Watson	6 ft 2 in (1.88 m)	180 lb (82 kg)	Sr	Las Vegas, Nevada

Head coach

- Bruce Pearl

Assistant coach(es)

Legend

- (C) Team captain
- (S) Suspended
- (I) Ineligible
- (W) Walk-on
- Injured
- Current redshirt

== Schedule and results ==
Date time, TV	Rank^{#}	Opponent^{#}	Result	Record	Site (attendance) city, state
Non-conference regular season
Nov 18, 2005*		East Tennessee State	W 106–83	1–0	Thompson-Boling Arena; Knoxville, Tennessee
Nov 22, 2005*		Louisiana-Lafayette	W 83–76	2–0	Thompson-Boling Arena; Knoxville, Tennessee
Nov 25, 2005*		Eastern Kentucky	W 92–58	3–0	Thompson-Boling Arena; Knoxville, Tennessee
Nov 30, 2005*		vs. Murray State	W 64–53	4–0	Gaylord Entertainment Center; Nashville, Tennessee
Dec 6, 2005*		Appalachian State	W 89–81	5–0	Thompson-Boling Arena; Knoxville, Tennessee
Dec 17, 2005*		at No. 6 Texas	W 95–78	6–0	Frank Erwin Center; Austin, Texas
Dec 22, 2005*	No. 23	vs. Oklahoma State	L 73–89	6–1	Ford Center; Oklahoma City, Oklahoma
Dec 27, 2005*		Alabama A&M	W 93–68	7–1	Thompson-Boling Arena; Knoxville, Tennessee
Dec 29, 2005*		Lipscomb	W 69–58	8–1	Thompson-Boling Arena; Knoxville, Tennessee
Jan 4, 2006*		South Alabama	W 87–69	9–1	Thompson-Boling Arena; Knoxville, Tennessee
SEC regular season
Jan 8, 2006		at South Carolina	W 76–69	10–1 (1–0)	Colonial Life Arena; Columbia, South Carolina
Jan 11, 2006		Georgia	W 89–76	11–1 (2–0)	Thompson-Boling Arena; Knoxville, Tennessee
Jan 14, 2006		at LSU	L 74–88	11–2 (2–1)	Maravich Assembly Center; Baton Rouge, Louisiana
Jan 18, 2006*		at No. 4 Memphis	L 79–88	11–3	FedExForum; Memphis, Tennessee
Jan 21, 2006		No. 2 Florida	W 80–76	12–3 (3–1)	Thompson-Boling Arena; Knoxville, Tennessee
Jan 25, 2006	No. 19	at Mississippi State	W 88–65	13–3 (4–1)	Humphrey Coliseum; Starkville, Mississippi
Jan 28, 2006	No. 19	South Carolina	W 81–65	14–3 (5–1)	Thompson-Boling Arena; Knoxville, Tennessee
Mar 4, 2006	No. 11	at Vanderbilt	W 68–59	21–6 (12–4)	Memorial Gymnasium; Nashville, Tennessee
SEC tournament
Mar 10, 2006*	No. 14	vs. South Carolina; Quarterfinals	L 71–79	21–7	Bridgestone Arena; Nashville, Tennessee
NCAA tournament
Mar 16, 2006*	(2 E) No. 18	vs. (15 E) Winthrop; First Round	W 63–61	22–7	Greensboro Coliseum; Greensboro, North Carolina
Mar 18, 2006*	(2 E) No. 18	vs. (7 E) Wichita State; Second Round	L 73–80	22–8	Greensboro Coliseum; Greensboro, North Carolina
*Non-conference game. ^{#}Rankings from AP Poll. (#) Tournament seedings in parentheses. All times are in Eastern Time.
