= 2005–06 Arkansas Razorbacks men's basketball team =

American college basketball season

2005–06 Arkansas Razorbacks men's basketball

NCAA tournament, Round of 64
- Conference: Southeastern Conference
- West
- Record: 22–10 (10–6 SEC)
- Head coach: Stan Heath (4th season)
- Home arena: Bud Walton Arena

2005–06 Southeastern Conference men's basketball standings
	Conf.				Overall
Team	W		L	PCT	W		L	PCT
East
No. 18 Tennessee	12	–	4	.750	22	–	8	.733
No. 11 Florida †	10	–	6	.625	33	–	6	.846
Kentucky	9	–	7	.563	22	–	13	.629
Vanderbilt	7	–	9	.438	17	–	13	.567
South Carolina	6	–	10	.375	23	–	15	.605
Georgia	5	–	11	.313	15	–	15	.500
West
No. 19 LSU	14	–	2	.875	27	–	9	.750
Alabama	10	–	6	.625	18	–	13	.581
Arkansas	10	–	6	.625	22	–	10	.688
Mississippi State	5	–	11	.313	15	–	15	.500
Auburn	4	–	12	.250	12	–	16	.429
Ole Miss	4	–	12	.250	14	–	16	.467
† 2006 SEC tournament winner Rankings from AP Poll

The 2005–06 Arkansas Razorbacks men's basketball team represented the University of Arkansas in the 2005–06 college basketball season. The head coach was Stan Heath, serving for his fourth year. The team played its home games in Bud Walton Arena in Fayetteville, Arkansas.

== Schedule ==
Date time, TV	Opponent	Result	Record	Site (attendance) city, state
11/18/05*; 8:05, no	Portland State	W 107–69	1–0	Bud Walton Arena (12,354); Fayetteville, Arkansas
11/21/05*; 11:30, ESPN2	vs. No. 3 Connecticut; Maui Invitational	L 68–77	1–1	Lahaina Civic Center (2,400); Maui, HI
11/22/05*; 4:00, ESPNU	vs. Kansas; Maui Invitational	W 65–64	2–1	Lahaina Civic Center (2,400); Maui, HI
11/23/05*; 2:00, ESPN	vs. No. 23 Maryland; Maui Invitational	L 62–75	2–2	Lahaina Civic Center (2,400); Maui, HI
11/26/05*; 4:00, FSN	Radford	W 75–55	3–2	Bud Walton Arena (N/A); Fayetteville, Arkansas
11/30/05*; 9:05, FSN	Southern Miss	W 75–35	4–2	Bud Walton Arena (10,103); Fayetteville, Arkansas
12/2/05*; 8:05, ARSN	Mizzou	W 66–63	5–2	Bud Walton Arena (17,420); Fayetteville, Arkansas
12/6/05*; 8:05, ARSN	Texas State	W 73–67	6–2	Bud Walton Arena (8,478); Fayetteville, Arkansas
12/15/05*; 8:05, ARSN	SW Missouri State	W 79–75	7–2	Bud Walton Arena (13,818); Fayetteville, Arkansas
12/17/05*; 8:35, ARSN	Rice	W 80–61	8–2	Alltel Arena (10,961); Little Rock, Arkansas
12/21/05*; 10:00, ESPN2	at Texas Tech	W 78–65	9–2	American Airlines Center (14,280); Dallas, Texas
12/30/05*; 8:05, ARSN	Texas Pan-American	W 66–38	10–2	Bud Walton Arena (14,734); Fayetteville, Arkansas
1/1/06*; 8:35, ARSN	Western Illinois	W 83–54	11–2	Bud Walton Arena (12,010); Fayetteville, Arkansas
1/7/06; 8:00, FSN	at Mississippi State	L 67–69	11–3	Humphrey Coliseum (9,842); Starkville, Mississippi
1/11/06; 8:05, no	LSU	L 58–63	11–4	Bud Walton Arena (18,689); Fayetteville, Arkansas
1/14/06; 3:05, no	Vanderbilt	W 78–66	12–4	Bud Walton Arena (18,720); Fayetteville, Arkansas
1/18/06; 8:00, JP Sports	at Alabama	L 75–78 ^{OT}	12–5	Coleman Coliseum (10,872); Tuscaloosa, AL
1/21/06; 2:00, no	at Auburn	W 68–52	13–5	Beard-Eaves Coliseum (6,100); Auburn, AL
1/25/06; 8:05, no	Ole Miss	W 71–58	14–5	Bud Walton Arena (18,121); Fayetteville, Arkansas
1/29/06; 1:00, CBS	at Kentucky	L 76–78	14–6	Rupp Arena (23,741); Lexington, Kentucky
2/4/06; 3:05, JP Sports	South Carolina	W 73–59	15–6	Bud Walton Arena (18,286); Fayetteville, Arkansas
2/8/06; 8:00, JP Sports	at LSU	L 77–78	15–7	Maravich Center (9,820); Baton Rouge, Louisiana
2/11/06; 8:05, FSN	Auburn	W 84–64	16–7	Bud Walton Arena (17,679); Fayetteville, Arkansas
2/15/06; 8:00, no	at Ole Miss	L 70–73	16–8	Tad Smith Coliseum (4,019); Oxford, Mississippi
2/18/06; 2:05, JP Sports	Florida	W 85–81	17–8	Bud Walton Arena (10,702); Fayetteville, Arkansas
2/21/06; 9:00, ESPN	Alabama	W 65–63	18–8	Bud Walton Arena (18,448); Fayetteville, Arkansas
2/25/06; 1:00, JP Sports	at No. 10 Tennessee	W 73–69	19–8	Thompson–Boling Arena (22,543); Knoxville, Tennessee
3/1/06; 8:05, JP Sports	Mississippi State	W 80–70	20–8	Bud Walton Arena (19,830); Fayetteville, Arkansas
3/5/06; 2:00, JP Sports	at Georgia	W 74–57	21–8	Stegeman Coliseum (6,170); Athens, Georgia
2006 SEC men's basketball tournament
3/9/06*; 9:45, JP Sports	vs. Georgia	W 80–67	22–8	Bridgestone Arena (13,926); Nashville, Tennessee
3/10/06*; 9:45, JP Sports	vs. Florida	L 71–74	22–9	Bridgestone Arena (17,777); Nashville, Tennessee
2006 NCAA Division I men's basketball tournament
3/17/06*; 12:30, CBS	vs. Bucknell	L 55–59	22–10	American Airlines Center (19,028); Dallas, Texas
*Non-conference game. ^{#}Rankings from AP Poll. (#) Tournament seedings in parentheses. All times are in EST.
