= 2005–06 Kentucky Wildcats men's basketball team =

2005–06 season of University of Kentucky men's basketball team

2005–06 Kentucky Wildcats men's basketball

NCAA tournament, Round of 32
- Conference: Southeastern Conference
- East Division
- Record: 22–13 (9–7 SEC)
- Head coach: Tubby Smith (9th season)
- Assistant coaches: David Hobbs; Scott Rigot; Reggie Hanson
- Home arena: Rupp Arena

2005–06 Southeastern Conference men's basketball standings
	Conf.				Overall
Team	W		L	PCT	W		L	PCT
East
No. 18 Tennessee	12	–	4	.750	22	–	8	.733
No. 11 Florida †	10	–	6	.625	33	–	6	.846
Kentucky	9	–	7	.563	22	–	13	.629
Vanderbilt	7	–	9	.438	17	–	13	.567
South Carolina	6	–	10	.375	23	–	15	.605
Georgia	5	–	11	.313	15	–	15	.500
West
No. 19 LSU	14	–	2	.875	27	–	9	.750
Alabama	10	–	6	.625	18	–	13	.581
Arkansas	10	–	6	.625	22	–	10	.688
Mississippi State	5	–	11	.313	15	–	15	.500
Auburn	4	–	12	.250	12	–	16	.429
Ole Miss	4	–	12	.250	14	–	16	.467
† 2006 SEC tournament winner Rankings from AP Poll

The 2005–06 Kentucky Wildcats men's basketball team represented University of Kentucky. The head coach was Tubby Smith. The team was a member of the Southeastern Conference and played their home games at Rupp Arena. The Wildcats finished with an overall record of 22–13 (9–7 SEC) In the 2006 NCAA Tournament Kentucky was invited as a #8 seed, and in the opening round game defeated UAB 69–64. In the round of 32 they lost to Connecticut 87–83.

== Incoming signees ==
College recruiting information (2005)
Name	Hometown	School	Height	Weight	Commit date
Jared Carter; C	Georgetown, Kentucky	Scott County High School	7 ft 2 in (2.18 m)	270 lb (120 kg)	Mar 31, 2005
Jared Carter; C	Recruit ratings: Scout: Rivals:				
Rekalin Sims; F	Salt Lake City, UT	Salt Lake High School	6 ft 8 in (2.03 m)	200 lb (91 kg)	Apr 21, 2005
Rekalin Sims; F	Recruit ratings: Scout: Rivals:				
Adam Williams; G	Bradenton, Florida	IMG Academy	6 ft 4 in (1.93 m)	190 lb (86 kg)	Oct 27, 2004
Adam Williams; G	Recruit ratings: Scout: Rivals:				
Overall recruit ranking: Scout: NR Rivals: NR
Note: In many cases, Scout, Rivals, 247Sports, On3, and ESPN may conflict in their listings of height and weight.; In these cases, the average was taken. ESPN grades are on a 100-point scale.; Sources: "Kentucky 2005 Basketball Commitments". Rivals.; "2005 Kentucky Basketball Commits". Scout.; "ESPN". ESPN.; "Scout.com Team Recruiting Rankings". Scout.; "2005 Team Ranking". Rivals.

== Roster ==
2005–06 Kentucky Wildcats men's basketball team
Players
Coaches

Pos.	#	Name	Height	Weight	Year	Previous school	Hometown
G	1	Brandon Stockton	5 ft 9 in (1.75 m)	170 lb (77 kg)	Sr	Glasgow	Glasgow, Kentucky
G	2	Ravi Moss	6 ft 2 in (1.88 m)	190 lb (86 kg)	Sr	University Heights	Hopkinsville, Kentucky
G	3	Ramel Bradley	6 ft 2 in (1.88 m)	191 lb (87 kg)	So	IMG Academy (FL)	Brooklyn, New York
G	4	Rajon Rondo	6 ft 1 in (1.85 m)	170 lb (77 kg)	So	Oak Hill Academy (VA)	Louisville, Kentucky
C	10	Łukasz Obrzut	7 ft 1 in (2.16 m)	265 lb (120 kg)	Jr	Bridgton Academy	Jędrzejów, Poland
G	12	Preston LeMaster	6 ft 2 in (1.88 m)	190 lb (86 kg)	Sr	Bourbon County	Paris, Kentucky
F	13	Bobby Perry	6 ft 7 in (2.01 m)	215 lb (98 kg)	Jr	Hillside	Durham, North Carolina
C	21	Shagari Alleyne	7 ft 3 in (2.21 m)	270 lb (122 kg)	Jr	Rice	Bronx, New York
G	22	Patrick Sparks	6 ft 0 in (1.83 m)	180 lb (82 kg)	RS Sr	Muhlenberg North	Central City, Kentucky
F	23	Sheray Thomas	6 ft 8 in (2.03 m)	240 lb (109 kg)	Jr	Riverdale Baptist (MD)	Montreal, Quebec
G	25	Adam Williams	6 ft 4 in (1.93 m)	190 lb (86 kg)	Fr	IMG Academy (FL)	St. Albans, West Virginia
G	32	Joe Crawford	6 ft 5 in (1.96 m)	215 lb (98 kg)	So	Renaissance	Detroit, Michigan
C	33	Randolph Morris	6 ft 11 in (2.11 m)	260 lb (118 kg)	So	Landmark Christian	Atlanta, Georgia
F	42	Rekalin Sims	6 ft 8 in (2.03 m)	200 lb (91 kg)	Jr	De La Salle	Vallejo, California
C	43	Jared Carter	7 ft 2 in (2.18 m)	277 lb (126 kg)	Jr	Scott County	Georgetown, Kentucky

Head coach

- Tubby Smith (High Point)

Assistant coach(es)

- David Hobbs (VCU)
- Scott Rigot (Buffalo)
- Reggie Hanson (Kentucky)

Legend

- (C) Team captain
- (S) Suspended
- (I) Ineligible
- (W) Walk-on
- Injured
- Current redshirt

== 2005–06 Schedule and Results ==
Date time, TV	Rank^{#}	Opponent^{#}	Result	Record	Site (attendance) city, state
Non-conference regular season
November 13, 2005*; 8:25 pm, ESPNU	No. 9	South Dakota State; Guardians Classic	W 71–54	1–0	Rupp Arena (20,144); Lexington, KY
November 14, 2005*; 8:35 pm, ESPNU	No. 8	Lipscomb; Guardians Classic	W 67–49	2–0	Rupp Arena (19,369); Lexington, KY
November 21, 2005*; 8:30 pm, ESPN2	No. 8	vs. No. 18 Iowa; Guardians Classic	L 63–67	2–1	Kemper Arena (6,091); Kansas City, MO
November 22, 2005*; 6:00 pm, ESPN2	No. 7	vs. No. 13 West Virginia; Guardians Classic	W 80–66	3–1	Kemper Arena (6,357); Kansas City, MO
November 25, 2005*; 7:00 pm	No. 7	Liberty	W 81–51	4–1	Rupp Arena (22,717); Lexington, KY
November 29, 2005*; 7:00 pm	No. 10	High Point	W 75–55	5–1	Rupp Arena (19,980); Lexington, KY
December 3, 2005*; 12:00 pm, CBS	No. 10	North Carolina	L 79–83	5–2	Rupp Arena (23,860); Lexington, KY
December 6, 2005*; 8:00 pm, ESPNU	No. 15	at Georgia State	W 73–46	6–2	Philips Arena (8,154); Atlanta, GA
December 10, 2005*; 3:45 pm, CBS	No. 15	vs. No. 18 Indiana	L 53–79	6–3	RCA Dome (28,031); Indianapolis, IN
December 17, 2005*; 2:00 pm, CBS	No. 23	No. 4 Louisville; Battle for the Bluegrass	W 73–61	7–3	Rupp Arena (24,432); Lexington, KY
December 23, 2005*; 7:00 pm	No. 19	vs. Iona	W 73–67	8–3	Freedom Hall (13,794); Louisville, KY
December 30, 2005*; 8:00 pm, ESPN2	No. 19	vs. Ohio	W 71–63	9–3	US Bank Arena (16,043); Cincinnati, OH
January 3, 2006*; 7:00 pm	No. 19	UCF	W 59–57	10–3	Rupp Arena (21,329); Lexington, KY
January 7, 2006*; 12:00 pm, ESPN	No. 19	at Kansas	L 46–73	10–4	Allen Fieldhouse (16,300); Lawrence, KS
SEC Regular Season
January 10, 2006; 9:00 pm, ESPN		Vanderbilt	L 52–57	10–5 (0–1)	Rupp Arena (23,643); Lexington, KY
January 14, 2006; 1:00 pm, CBS		Alabama	L 64–68	10–6 (0–2)	Rupp Arena (23,471); Lexington, KY
January 17, 2006; 9:00 pm, ESPN		at Georgia	W 69–55	11–6 (1–2)	Stegeman Coliseum (10,027); Athens, GA
January 21, 2006; 1:00 pm, JP Sports		South Carolina	W 80–78	12–6 (2–2)	Rupp Arena (23,420); Lexington, KY
January 24, 2006; 7:00 pm, ESPN		at Auburn	W 71–62	13–6 (3–2)	Beard-Eaves-Memorial Coliseum (6,651); Auburn, AL
January 29, 2006; 1:00 pm, CBS		Arkansas	W 78–76	14–6 (4–2)	Rupp Arena (23,741); Lexington, KY
February 1, 2006; 8:00 pm, JP Sports		at Mississippi State	W 81–66	15–6 (5–2)	Humphrey Coliseum (9,876); Starkville, MS
February 4, 2006; 9:00 pm, ESPN		at No. 8 Florida; ESPN College GameDay	L 80–95	15–7 (5–3)	O'Connell Center (12,609); Gainesville, FL
February 7, 2006; 7:00 pm, ESPN		No. 11 Tennessee	L 67–75	15–8 (5–4)	Rupp Arena (24,184); Lexington, KY
February 11, 2006; 3:00 pm, JP Sports		at Vanderbilt	L 81–84	15–9 (5–5)	Memorial Gym (14,316); Nashville, TN
February 15, 2006; 8:00 pm, JP Sports		Georgia	W 68–61	16–9 (6–5)	Rupp Arena (22,548); Lexington, KY
February 18, 2006; 1:30 pm, CBS		at South Carolina	W 79–66	17–9 (7–5)	Colonial Life Arena (17,188); Columbia, SC
February 22, 2006; 8:00 pm, JP Sports		Mississippi	W 80–40	18–9 (8–5)	Rupp Arena (24,278); Lexington, KY
February 25, 2006; 3:45 pm, CBS		at No. 24 LSU	L 67–71	18–10 (8–6)	Pete Maravich Assembly Center (11,576); Baton Rouge, LA
March 1, 2006; 8:00 pm, JP Sports		at No. 11 Tennessee	W 80–78	19–10 (9–6)	Thompson-Boling Arena (24,108); Knoxville, TN
March 5, 2006; 12:00 pm, CBS		No. 17 Florida	L 64–79	19–11 (9–7)	Rupp Arena (24,329); Lexington, KY
2006 SEC Tournament
March 9, 2006; 2:15 pm	(E3)	vs. (W6) Mississippi; First Round	W 79–67	20–11	Gaylord Entertainment Center (15,454); Nashville, TN
March 10, 2006; 2:35 pm, JP Sports	(E3)	vs. (W2) Alabama; Quarterfinals	W 68–61	21–11	Gaylord Entertainment Center (19,547); Nashville, TN
March 11, 2006; 12:00 pm, JP Sports	(E3)	vs. (E5) South Carolina; Semifinals	L 61–65	21–12	Gaylord Entertainment Center (17,777); Nashville, TN
2006 NCAA Tournament
March 17, 2006*; 9:55 pm, CBS	(8 W)	vs. (9 W) UAB; First Round	W 69–64	22–12	Wachovia Center (19,990); Philadelphia, PA
March 19, 2006*; 2:30 pm, CBS	(8 W)	vs. (1 W) No. 2 Connecticut; Second Round	L 83–87	22–13	Wachovia Center (20,050); Philadelphia, PA
*Non-conference game. ^{#}Rankings from AP Poll. (#) Tournament seedings in parentheses. W=Washington, D.C. Regional.

== NCAA basketball tournament ==
- East
  - Kentucky (#8 seed) 69, UAB (#9 seed) 64
  - Connecticut (#1 seed) 87, Kentucky 83

== Team players drafted into the NBA ==
Round	Pick	Player	NBA club
1	21	Rajon Rondo	Phoenix Suns

== See also ==
- Kentucky Wildcats men's basketball
- 2006 NCAA Division I men's basketball tournament
