= John Pelphrey =

American college basketball coach (born 1968)

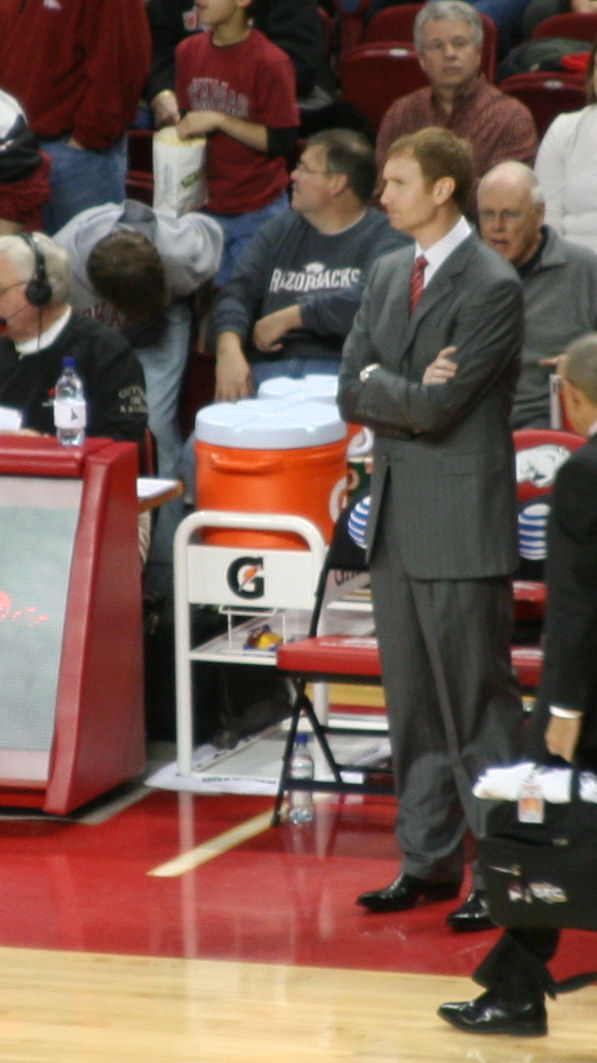
- Pelphrey during the 2009 Arkansas–Georgia game

Biographical details
- Born: July 18, 1968 (age 58); Paintsville, Kentucky, U.S.

Playing career
- 1988–1992: Kentucky
- Position: Forward

Coaching career (HC unless noted)
- 1993–1994: Oklahoma State (assistant)
- 1994–1996: Marshall (assistant)
- 1996–2002: Florida (assistant)
- 2002–2007: South Alabama
- 2007–2011: Arkansas
- 2011–2015: Florida (assistant)
- 2016–2019: Alabama (assistant)
- 2019–2026: Tennessee Tech

Head coaching record
- Overall: 228–264 (.463)
- Tournaments: 1–2 (NCAA Division I); 0–1 (NIT)

Accomplishments and honors

Championships
- Sun Belt tournament (2006); Sun Belt regular season (2007)

Awards
- Sun Belt Coach of the Year (2006)

John Leslie Pelphrey (born July 18, 1968) is an American college basketball coach, most recently the head coach of the Tennessee Tech Golden Eagles. After being named Kentucky Mr. Basketball in 1987, he became a star college player at the University of Kentucky.

After his playing career ended, Pelphrey became as an assistant coach under Eddie Sutton at Oklahoma State University. He was then hired to serve under Billy Donovan at Marshall University and followed him to Florida. Pelphrey took his first head coaching job in 2002, when he was hired by the University of South Alabama, and in 2007 he was chosen to take the head coaching position at the University of Arkansas. After leaving Arkansas, he returned to Florida.

== Playing career ==
=== Early years ===
John Pelphrey was born in Paintsville, Kentucky. He attended Paintsville High School, where he was coached by Bill Mike Runyon. He would lead the Tigers to the Sweet Sixteen in the state tournament, and make the Sweet Sixteen Fab 50. During his senior year as a Tiger (1987), the team's final record was 32–5. The team won Paintsville Invitational Championship, the Hillbrook Classic, the 57th District Championship, the 15th Region Championship, and made the KHSAA "Sweet Sixteen" Final Four where they lost to eventual state runner-up Louisville Ballard led by future NBA player Allan Houston. A two-sport athlete, Pelphrey also had a passion for baseball; he played during his high school years as a shortstop and a pitcher.

=== College ===
While a player at the University of Kentucky (UK) from 1988 to 1992, Pelphrey led the Wildcats to the SEC tournament championship and an NCAA tournament appearance, including the epic battle with Duke in the 1992 Elite Eight. Pelphrey was a two-time captain while at Kentucky and in 1989 was named the UK Student Athlete of the Year. During his collegiate career, Pelphrey started 90 of 114 games, and averaged 11 points per game over his career. In 2005, Pelphrey was inducted into the Kentucky Hall of Fame.

During his freshman year in 1988–89, the UK program was rocked by a major scandal. One player, Eric Manuel, was found by the NCAA to have received improper assistance on his college entrance exams. A second player, Chris Mills, received cash payments from a booster. The scandal led to the resignation of coach Eddie Sutton and athletic director Cliff Hagan, and led to major NCAA sanctions. Pelphrey and his fellow freshmen, Richie Farmer, Deron Feldhaus and Sean Woods, stayed with the program despite the sanctions, and entered UK lore during their senior season in 1991–92.

During the 1991–92 season, the Kentucky team coached by Rick Pitino and playing its first season after NCAA probation, advanced all the way to the Elite Eight, where it lost to Duke in the East Regional title game. This game is widely regarded as one of the greatest in college basketball history, ending with the Blue Devils' Christian Laettner's buzzer-beating shot in overtime. Pelphrey was the primary defender on the play. Pelphrey and fellow senior became known as "The Unforgetable", a nickname given by Pitino in recognition of their leadership and commitment during Kentucky's rebuilding period. Perlphrey is one of the 36 former Kentucky players whose jersey retired (#34) has been retired by the university.

== Coaching career ==
=== Oklahoma State ===
After leaving Kentucky, Pelphrey failed to get drafted in the NBA and spent a short time playing professional basketball in France and Spain before joining his former coach Eddie Sutton's staff at Oklahoma State for the 1993–94 season.

=== Marshall ===
Pelphrey joined Billy Donovan's staff at Marshall for two years and was instrumental in the resurgence of the Thundering Herd program.

=== Florida ===
In 1996, he followed Donovan from Marshall to Florida and coached as an assistant for six years. He helped the Gators garner a school record four straight NCAA tournament appearances from 1999 to 2002. During the 1999–2000 season, the Gators made their first-ever appearance in the national championship game against Michigan State.

=== South Alabama ===
Pelphrey spent five seasons as head coach at the University of South Alabama, starting in 2002. In his first season there in 2002–03, Pelphrey led the Jaguars to a 14–14 record but had subsequently bad seasons the next two years, going 12–16 in 2003–04 and then 10–18 in 2004–05. In 2005–06 the Jaguars defeated Western Kentucky University in the Sun Belt Conference tournament championship game, earning USA's first NCAA tournament bid since 1998. The Jaguars lost to eventual tournament champions, Florida in the round of 64.

In 2007, Pelphrey led the Jags to a regular season title but they fell short in the Sun Belt Conference tournament quarterfinals after losing the final four games of the regular season. This led to an NIT berth and resulted in a loss to Syracuse in the first round 79–73, which was South Alabama's sixth straight loss to end the season. South Alabama finished the year with a 20–12 record, giving Pelphrey an overall record of 80–67 with the Jags.

=== Arkansas ===
Pelphrey was announced as the new head coach of the University of Arkansas basketball team at a press conference on Monday, April 9, 2007, in Fayetteville, Arkansas. Pelphrey replaced Stan Heath, whose tenure ended with the University of Arkansas on March 26, 2007. The Razorbacks began the season ranked #19, but fell out of the top 25 after losing their third game of the season to unranked Providence. Arkansas went on to win six consecutive games to improve to 8–1, before losing to the Oklahoma Sooners. They finished the non-conference season 11–3, highlighted by wins over Missouri and Baylor.

The Razorbacks won their first two conference games against Auburn and Alabama, before losing their next two to South Carolina and Georgia. Pelphrey's Razorback team then responded with back-to-back home wins against two ranked opponents, defeating Mississippi State and also Florida, coached by one of his mentors and dear friend, Billy Donovan. The Razorbacks also handed a loss to ranked Vanderbilt along the way. Arkansas finished the SEC regular season with a 9–7 record.

The Razorbacks defeated Vanderbilt (then ranked 18th nationally) again in the 2008 SEC tournament. They followed this up with arguably their most significant victory of the season, a 92–91 win over #4 Tennessee in the tourney semifinals. The Razorbacks lost in the championship game to underdog Georgia, but rebounded to defeat Indiana 86–72 in the opening round of the NCAA tournament. It was the Razorbacks' first NCAA tourney victory since 1999. The Razorbacks were eliminated by overall #1 seed North Carolina in the second round.

On December 30, 2008, Pelphrey earned his biggest upset as coach of the Razorbacks up until that point by beating #4 ranked Oklahoma in Bud Walton Arena, 96–88. On January 6, 2009, Pelphrey followed that victory up with a huge win over one of Arkansas' archrivals from its Southwest Conference days, the #7 ranked Texas Longhorns, 67–61. However, after those wins, Pelphrey's season rapidly went downhill as the Razorbacks went on to a last-place finish in the SEC West with a 2–14 record and an overall final record of 14–16.

In the 2009–10 season, Pelphrey's team started off slow, losing to Morgan State, East Tennessee State and South Alabama early in non-conference play. But Arkansas regained some momentum by winning five in a row to have a 7–5 record, although the victories came against Mississippi Valley State, Delaware State, Alabama State, Stephen F. Austin and Missouri State. The Razorbacks then lost four straight, including the Southeastern Conference opener against Mississippi State. Arkansas was humbled in a 101–70 loss at Kentucky but followed with five straight SEC wins to improve to 13–11. However, the Razorbacks finished the season on another slide, losing their final five games of the regular season before falling to Georgia in the first round of the SEC tournament by a score of 77–64 to end with a six-game losing streak. The six-game slide is the longest in the history of University of Arkansas basketball to end a season with, and dropped the Razorbacks to 14–18.

His fourth season saw an improvement in the overall record, getting to 18–13, but the team was unable to secure any invitation to postseason play.

Despite having signed a highly regarded recruiting class, on March 13, 2011, Pelphrey was fired as head coach at the University of Arkansas. He said he felt that the university did not give him enough time to complete a turnaround of the program. His record after four seasons with the Razorbacks was 69–59.

=== Florida, second stint ===
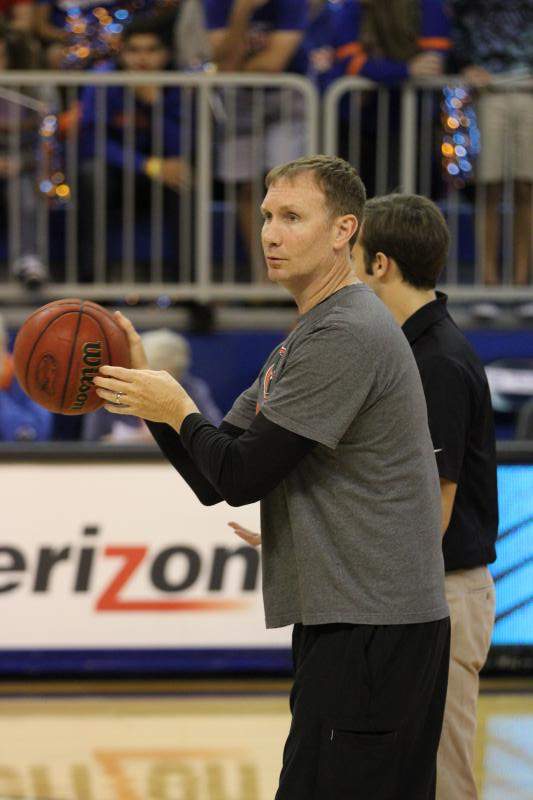
Pelphrey at Florida

On April 12, 2011, Pelphrey was re-hired by his former boss Billy Donovan to be an assistant at Florida.

He was not retained by new Florida coach Michael White following Donovan's departure in 2015. During the 2015–16 season, he worked as an analyst on the SEC Network.

=== Alabama ===
Avery Johnson announced on April 7, 2016, that he had hired Pelphrey to his staff at Alabama.

=== Tennessee Tech ===
Pelphrey was announced as the program's 13th head coach on April 6, 2019.

On March 3, 2026, Pelphrey was fired as head coach, following seven seasons where the Golden Eagles failed to reach the NCAA Tournament or have a winning record.

== Personal life ==
Pelphrey and his wife Tracy Lyon have two living children: a son, Jaxson, and a daughter, Grace Donovan. In 2003, the Pelphreys' infant son, John Patrick, died of a rare blood disorder. On June 10, 2008, Pelphrey and his wife launched the Pel's Pals Foundation as a memorial to John Patrick.

His brother, Jerry, was a player and assistant coach for the East Tennessee State men's basketball team.

== Head coaching record ==
Record table
Season	Team	Overall	Conference	Standing	Postseason
South Alabama Jaguars (Sun Belt Conference) (2002–2007)
2002–03	South Alabama	14–14	7–8	T–3rd (West)	
2003–04	South Alabama	12–16	6–9	T–4th (West)	
2004–05	South Alabama	10–18	6–9	T–4th (West)	
2005–06	South Alabama	24–7	12–3	1st (West)	NCAA Division I First Round
2006–07	South Alabama	20–12	13–5	1st (East)	NIT First Round
South Alabama:		80–67 (.544)	44–35 (.557)		
Arkansas Razorbacks (Southeastern Conference) (2007–2011)
2007–08	Arkansas	23–12	9–7	2nd (West)	NCAA Division I Second Round
2008–09	Arkansas	14–16	2–14	6th (West)	
2009–10	Arkansas	14–18	7–9	3rd (West)	
2010–11	Arkansas	18–13	7–9	4th (West)	
Arkansas:		69–59 (.539)	25–39 (.391)		
Tennessee Tech Golden Eagles (Ohio Valley Conference) (2019–2026)
2019–20	Tennessee Tech	9–22	6–12	9th	
2020–21	Tennessee Tech	5–22	5–15	11th	
2021–22	Tennessee Tech	11–21	7–10	7th	
2022–23	Tennessee Tech	16–17	11–7	2nd	
2023–24	Tennessee Tech	10–21	5–13	T–8th	
2024–25	Tennessee Tech	15–16	10–10	T–5th	
2025–26	Tennessee Tech	13–18	8–12	T–8th	
Tennessee Tech:		79–138 (.364)	52–79 (.397)		
Total:		228–264 (.463)			
National champion Postseason invitational champion Conference regular season champion Conference regular season and conference tournament champion Division regular season champion Division regular season and conference tournament champion Conference tournament champion

== Awards ==
=== Player ===
- 1987 Kentucky "Mr. Basketball"
- 1990 Best Playmaker and Mr. Deflection Award
- 1990 Academic All-SEC
- 1990-92 Kentucky Team Captain
- 1991 Kentucky Team MVP
- 1991 All-SEC First Team, UPI & Coaches Poll
- 1991 AP All-SEC Second-team
- 1991 Honorable Mention All-America
- 1992 Kentucky retired his jersey (#34)

=== Coaching ===
- 2006 Sun Belt Conference Coach of the Year
