= 2005–06 Texas A&M Aggies men's basketball team =

American college basketball season

2005–06 Texas A&M Aggies men's basketball

NCAA Tournament, second round
- Conference: Big 12 Conference
- Record: 22–9 (10–6 Big 12)
- Head coach: Billy Gillispie
- Home arena: Reed Arena

2005–06 Big 12 men's basketball standings
	Conf.				Overall
Team	W		L	PCT	W		L	PCT
No. 9 Texas	13	–	3	.813	30	–	7	.811
No. 12 Kansas †	13	–	3	.813	25	–	8	.758
No. 24 Oklahoma	11	–	5	.688	20	–	9	.690
Texas A&M	10	–	6	.625	22	–	9	.710
Colorado	9	–	7	.563	20	–	10	.667
Nebraska	7	–	9	.438	19	–	14	.576
Oklahoma State	6	–	10	.375	17	–	16	.515
Texas Tech	6	–	10	.375	15	–	17	.469
Kansas State	6	–	10	.375	15	–	13	.536
Iowa State	6	–	10	.375	16	–	14	.533
Missouri	5	–	11	.313	12	–	16	.429
Baylor	4	–	12	.250	4	–	13	.235
† 2006 Big 12 Tournament winner Rankings from AP poll

The 2005–06 Texas A&M Aggies men's basketball team represented Texas A&M University during the 2005–06 NCAA Division I men's basketball season. The team was led by head coach Billy Gillispie, and played their home games at Reed Arena in College Station, Texas as a member of the Big 12 Conference.

== Recruiting ==
College recruiting information
Name	Hometown	School	Height	Weight	Commit date
Martellus Bennett; PF	Alief, TX	Martellus	6 ft 7 in (2.01 m)	237 lb (108 kg)	Jan 31, 2005
Martellus Bennett; PF	Recruit ratings: Scout: Rivals:				
Josh Carter; SG	Dallas, TX	Lake Highlands	6 ft 4 in (1.93 m)	170 lb (77 kg)	Oct 13, 2004
Josh Carter; SG	Recruit ratings: Scout: Rivals:				
David Devezin; PG	Missouri City, TX	Marshall High School	5 ft 11 in (1.80 m)	175 lb (79 kg)	Sep 9, 2004
David Devezin; PG	Recruit ratings: Scout: Rivals:				
Jamar Finley; SG	Carthage, TX	Panola	6 ft 6 in (1.98 m)	175 lb (79 kg)	Nov 11, 2004
Jamar Finley; SG	Recruit ratings: Scout: Rivals:				
Antanas Kavaliauskas; C	Great Bend, KS	Barton County	6 ft 11 in (2.11 m)	240 lb (110 kg)	Apr 26, 2005
Antanas Kavaliauskas; C	Recruit ratings: Scout: Rivals:				
Eddie Smith; PG	Moberly, MO	Moberly Area	6 ft 2 in (1.88 m)	180 lb (82 kg)	Apr 26, 2005
Eddie Smith; PG	Recruit ratings: Scout: Rivals:				
Overall recruit ranking: Scout: NR
Note: In many cases, Scout, Rivals, 247Sports, On3, and ESPN may conflict in their listings of height and weight.; In these cases, the average was taken. ESPN grades are on a 100-point scale.; Sources: "Texas A&M 2005 Basketball Commitments". Rivals.; "2005 Texas A&M Commits". Scout.; "Scout.com Team Recruiting Rankings". Scout.; "2005 Team Ranking". Rivals.

== Players ==
=== Roster ===
Name	Number	Position	Height	Weight*	Year	Hometown
Benac, Drew	31	G	6–4	212	Fr.	Boerne, Texas
Bennett, Martellus	2	F	6–7	240	Fr.	Alief, Texas
Blackburn, Brian	13	G	5-8	150	Jr.	La Vernia, Texas
Carter, Josh	23	F	6–5	175	Fr.	Dallas, Texas
Devezin, David	3	G	6–1	175	Fr.	Sugar Land, Texas
Elonu, Chinemelu	50	F/C	6–10	220	Fr.	Houston, Texas
Kirk, Dominique	22	G	6–3	180	So.	Dallas, Texas
Green, Edjuan	4	G	6–7	230	Sr.	Spring, Texas
Johnston, Josh	14	G	6–2	165	Jr.	Lumberton, Texas
Jones, Joseph	30	F	6–9	250	So.	Normangee, Texas
Kavaliauskas, Antanas	44	C	6–10	250	Jr.	Vilnius, Lithuania
Law IV, Acie	1	G	6–3	185	Jr.	Dallas, Texas
Lee, Logan	20	G	6–2	185	Jr.	San Antonio, Texas
Muhlbach, Beau	32	G/F	6–3	195	So.	Lufkin, Texas
Pompey, Marlon	42	F	6–8	225	Jr.	Toronto, Ontario
Smith, Eddie	12	G	6–2	185	Sr.	Springfield, Illinois
Walker, Chris	10	F	6–5	210	Sr.	Grapevine, Texas
Weishuhn, Slade	40	C	6–9	220	Fr.	Wall, Texas
White, Kenneth	5	G	6–1	200	So.	Dallas, Texas

== Schedule ==
Date time, TV	Rank^{#}	Opponent^{#}	Result	Record	Site city, state
Regular season
Nov. 20, 2005		Southern	W 88–44	1–0	Reed Arena; College Station, TX
Nov. 22, 2005		Mississippi Valley State	W 84–53	2–0	Reed Arena; College Station, TX
Nov. 26, 2005		Tulane	W 83–57	3–0	Reed Arena; College Station, TX
Dec. 3, 2005		Penn State	W 60–55	4–0	Reed Arena; College Station, TX
Dec 6, 2005		North Texas	W 72–70	5–0	Reed Arena; College Station, TX
Dec. 10, 2005		Grambling State	W 101–71	6–0	Reed Arena; College Station, TX
Dec. 17, 2005		Savannah State	W 67–34	7–0	Reed Arena; College Station, TX
Dec. 22, 2005		Auburn	W 72–67	8–0	Reed Arena; College Station, TX
Dec. 27, 2005		Texas Southern	W 81–56	9–0	Reed Arena; College Station, TX
Dec. 31, 2005		Northwestern State	W 73–61	10–0	Reed Arena; College Station, TX
Jan. 3, 2005		at Pacific	L 56–63	10–1	Alex G. Spanos Center; Stockton, CA
Jan. 7, 2006		Texas Tech	W 63–55	11–1 (1–0)	Reed Arena; College Station
Jan. 11, 2006		at Oklahoma State	L 77–79	11–2 (1–1)	Gallagher-Iba Arena; Stillwater, OK
Jan. 14, 2006		No. 22 Oklahoma	L 44–45	11–3 (1–2)	Reed Arena; College Station, TX
Jan. 18, 2006		at Kansas State	L 54–58	11–4 (1–3)	Bramlage Coliseum; Manhattan, KS
Jan. 21, 2006		at Iowa State	W 86–81 OT	12–4 (2–3)	Hilton Coliseum; Ames, IA
Jan. 25, 2006		Kansas	L 73–83	12–5 (2–4)	Reed Arena; College Station, TX
Jan. 28, 2006		Baylor	W 72–70	13–5 (3–4)	Reed Arena; College Station, TX
Feb. 1, 2006		at No. 18 Oklahoma	L 63–71	13–6 (3–5)	Lloyd Noble Center; Norman, OK
Feb. 4, 2006		at No. 7 Texas	L 70–83	13–7 (3–6)	Frank Erwin Center; Austin, TX
Feb. 8, 2006		No. 25 Colorado	W 61-58	14–7 (4–6)	Reed Arena; College Station, TX
Feb. 11, 2006		Oklahoma State	W 46–44	15–7 (5–6)	Reed Arena; College Station, TX
Feb. 18, 2006		at Baylor	W 64–60	16–7 (6–6)	Ferrell Center; Waco, TX
Feb. 21, 2006		at Missouri	W 54– 51	17–7 (7–6)	Mizzou Arena; Columbia, MO
Feb. 25, 2006		Nebraska	W 66–55	18–7 (8–6)	Reed Arena; College Station, TX
Mar. 1, 2006		No. 6 Texas	W 46–43	19–7 (9–6)	Reed Arena; College Station, TX
Mar. 4, 2006		at Texas Tech	W 75–59	20–7 (10–6)	United Spirit Arena; Lubbock, TX
Postseason
Mar. 10, 2006		vs. Colorado; 2006 Big 12 Men's Basketball Tournament, Second Round	W 86–53	21–7	American Airlines Center; Dallas, TX
Mar. 11, 2006		vs. No. 8 Texas; 2006 Big 12 Men's Basketball Tournament, Semifinals	L 70–74	21–8	American Airlines Center; Dallas, TX
Mar. 16, 2006		vs. No. 21 Syracuse; First Round	W 66–58	22–8	Jacksonville Veterans Memorial Arena; Jacksonville, FL
Mar. 18, 2006		vs. No. 18 LSU; Second Round	L 57–58	22–9	Jacksonville Veterans Memorial Arena; Jacksonville, FL
*Non-conference game. ^{#}Rankings from Coaches Poll. (#) Tournament seedings in parentheses. All times are in Central Time.
