= Christian Moody =

American former basketball player (born 1983)

Personal information
- Born: December 28, 1983 (age 42) Washington, D.C., U.S.
- Listed height: 6 ft 8 in (2.03 m)
- Listed weight: 220 lb (100 kg)

Career information
- High school: T. C. Roberson (Asheville, North Carolina)
- College: Kansas (2002–2006)
- NBA draft: 2006: undrafted
- Playing career: 2008–2008
- Position: Power forward

Career history
- 2008: Lakeside Lightning

Career highlights
- SBL All Star Third Team (2008)

Mark Christian Daniel Moody (born December 28, 1983) is an American former basketball player who played four seasons of college basketball for the Kansas Jayhawks and one season in Australia for the Lakeside Lightning of the State Basketball League (SBL). In 2006, he was a member of the Athletes in Action USA team that won the William Jones Cup.

== High school career ==
Moody attended T. C. Roberson High School in Asheville, North Carolina, where he played for the school's basketball team. As a senior in 2001–02, he led Roberson to a 27–5 record and a berth in the Class 3A state tournament semifinals. For the season, he averaged 23.1 points and 9.3 rebounds and was a nominee for North Carolina's Mr. Basketball Award. An excellent student in high school, Moody scored a 1390 on his SAT and had a 4.65 weighted GPA.

== College career ==
Moody played sparingly for the Kansas Jayhawks over his first two seasons, averaging 2.3 minutes per game as a freshman and 7.0 minutes per game as a sophomore.

As a junior in 2004–05, Moody averaged career highs across the board, with 5.8 points and 4.7 rebounds in 22.6 minutes per game. He started in 25 of the 27 games he appeared in. On December 9, 2004, he recorded his first career double-double with 10 points and 10 rebounds in a 93–74 win over TCU. He had a career-high 11 points twice during the season.

As a senior in 2005–06, Moody averaged 3.4 points and 2.9 rebounds in 12.5 minutes per game, with nine starts in 31 appearances. On December 3, 2005, he scored a career-high 12 points in an 86–57 win over Western Illinois. On January 11, 2006, he set a new career high with 18 points in a 75–63 win over Colorado. The Jayhawks were champions of the 2006 Big 12 tournament, with Moody seeing six minutes in the semifinal win over Nebraska. They went on to lose in the first round of the NCAA tournament to Bradley.

Moody graduated from Kansas in May 2006 with a degree in Human Biology/Pre-Med and was the recipient of the Dr. Prentice Gautt Post-Graduate Scholarship from the Big 12 Conference. He was named first-team Academic All-Big 12 as a sophomore, junior and senior.

== Professional career ==
In July 2006, Moody was a member of the Athletes in Action USA team that won the William Jones Cup in Taiwan. He averaged 6.7 points and 6.0 rebounds in 17.9 minutes per game.

In 2008, Moody played in Australia for the Lakeside Lightning of the State Basketball League (SBL). In 25 games, he averaged 25.4 points, 13.2 rebounds, 2.0 assists, 1.3 steals and 1.7 blocks in 40 minutes per game. He subsequently earned SBL All Star Third Team honors.

== Personal ==
Moody is the son of Mark and Mary Moody. His younger brother Patrick played college basketball for UNC.
