= 2005–06 Texas Tech Red Raiders basketball team =

American college basketball season

2005–06 Texas Tech Red Raiders basketball
- Conference: Big 12 Conference
- Record: 15–17 (6–10 Big 12)
- Head coach: Bob Knight (5th season)
- Assistant coaches: Chris Beard (5th season); Pat Knight (5th season); Stew Robinson (3rd season)
- Home arena: United Spirit Arena

2005–06 Big 12 men's basketball standings
	Conf.				Overall
Team	W		L	PCT	W		L	PCT
No. 9 Texas	13	–	3	.813	30	–	7	.811
No. 12 Kansas †	13	–	3	.813	25	–	8	.758
No. 24 Oklahoma	11	–	5	.688	20	–	9	.690
Texas A&M	10	–	6	.625	22	–	9	.710
Colorado	9	–	7	.563	20	–	10	.667
Nebraska	7	–	9	.438	19	–	14	.576
Oklahoma State	6	–	10	.375	17	–	16	.515
Texas Tech	6	–	10	.375	15	–	17	.469
Kansas State	6	–	10	.375	15	–	13	.536
Iowa State	6	–	10	.375	16	–	14	.533
Missouri	5	–	11	.313	12	–	16	.429
Baylor	4	–	12	.250	4	–	13	.235
† 2006 Big 12 Tournament winner Rankings from AP poll

The 2005–06 Texas Tech Red Raiders basketball team represented Texas Tech University in the 2005–06 NCAA Division I men's basketball season as a member of the Big 12 Conference. The Red Raiders were led by fifth-year coach Bob Knight. They played their home games at the United Spirit Arena in Lubbock, Texas.

== Roster ==
2005–06 Texas Tech Red Raiders men's basketball team
Players
Coaches

Pos.	#	Name	Height	Weight	Year	Hometown
G	3	Martin Zeno	6 ft 5 in (1.96 m)	208 lb (94 kg)	So	Sulphur, LA
G	5	Drew Coffman	6 ft 1 in (1.85 m)	197 lb (89 kg)	Jr	Midland, TX
G	13	Terry Martin	6 ft 6 in (1.98 m)	210 lb (95 kg)	Fr	Monroe, LA
G	20	Alan Voskuil	6 ft 3 in (1.91 m)	181 lb (82 kg)	Fr	Bedford, TX
G	22	Jarrius Jackson	6 ft 1 in (1.85 m)	185 lb (84 kg)	Jr	Monroe, LA
F	30	Michael Prince	6 ft 7 in (2.01 m)	208 lb (94 kg)	Fr	Plano, TX
F	31	Tanner Ogden	6 ft 7 in (2.01 m)	220 lb (100 kg)	Jr	Seminole, TX
F	32	Jon Plefka	6 ft 8 in (2.03 m)	245 lb (111 kg)	Jr	New Britain, CT
F	33	Jeremy Buttell	6 ft 7 in (2.01 m)	235 lb (107 kg)	Fr	Colleyville, TX
G	33	LucQuente White	6 ft 1 in (1.85 m)	176 lb (80 kg)	Jr	Midland, TX
F	33	Dior Lowhorn	6 ft 7 in (2.01 m)	230 lb (104 kg)	Fr	San Francisco, CA
F	44	Darryl Dora	6 ft 9 in (2.06 m)	250 lb (113 kg)	Jr	Gonzalez, TX
F	55	Dazzmond Thornton	6 ft 11 in (2.11 m)	275 lb (125 kg)	Fr	Denver, CO

Head coach

- Bob Knight

Assistant coach(es)

- Chris Beard
- Pat Knight

Legend

- (C) Team captain
- (S) Suspended
- (I) Ineligible
- (W) Walk-on
- Injured
- Current redshirt

Roster
Last update: November 11, 2022

== Schedule and results ==
Date time, TV	Rank^{#}	Opponent^{#}	Result	Record	High points	High rebounds	High assists	Site (attendance) city, state
Non-conference regular season
November 10, 2005*; 7:00 p.m.		San Jose State; 2K Sports College Hoop Classic first round	W 88–54	1–0	19 – Jackson	8 – Tied	4 – Jackson	United Spirit Arena (7,943); Lubbock, TX
November 11, 2005*; 8:00 p.m.		Georgia Southern; 2K Sports College Hoop Classic second round	W 74–61	2–0	28 – Zeno	7 – Zeno	6 – Tied	United Spirits Arena (7,477); Lubbock, TX
November 17, 2005*; 9:00 p.m.		vs. No. 16 Syracuse; 2K Sports College Hoop Classic semifinals	L 46–81	2–1	11 – Lowhorn	5 – Tied	2 – Tied	Madison Square Garden (8,549); New York, NY
November 18, 2005*; 7:00 p.m.		vs. No. 19 Wake Forest; 2K Sports College Hoop Classic consolation	L 73–78 ^{2OT}	2–2	27 – Jackson	8 – Zeno	4 – Jackson	Madison Square Garden (12,345); New York, NY
November 23, 2005*; 7:00 p.m.		Furman	W 83–74	3–2	22 – Tied	7 – Dora	5 – Tied	United Spirit Arena (5,877); Lubbock, TX
November 26, 2005*; 1:00 p.m.		Morehead State	W 76–42	4–2	27 – Jackson	8 – Zeno	5 – Coffman	United Spirit Arena (5,227); Lubbock, TX
November 30, 2005*; 7:00 p.m.		TCU	W 81–54	5–2	23 – Jackson	7 – Tied	5 – Jackson	United Spirit Arena (7,227); Lubbock, TX
December 3, 2005*; 9:00 p.m.		at San Francisco; Northwestern Mutual Shootout	L 78–90	5–3	20 – Lowhorn	7 – Zeno	6 – Tied	War Memorial Gym (5,300); San Francisco, CA
December 7, 2005*; 7:00 p.m.		Louisiana Tech	L 53–68	5–4	19 – Jackson	4 – Jackson	4 – Zeno	United Spirit Arena (5,445); Lubbock, TX
December 10, 2005*; 1:00 p.m.		UT-Pan American	W 103–50	6–4	22 – Jackson	6 – Thornton	6 – Tied	United Spirit Arena (6,013); Lubbock, TX
December 17, 2005*; 9:00 p.m.		at UNLV	L 73–84	6–5	22 – Tied	5 – Plefka	4 – Jackson	Thomas & Mack Center (10,011); Las Vegas, NV
December 21, 2005*; 9:00 p.m.		vs. Arkansas	L 65–78	6–6	19 – Jackson	7 – Dora	2 – Tied	American Airlines Center (14,280); Dallas, TX
December 29, 2005*; 8:00 p.m.		at New Mexico State	W 69–63	7–6	24 – Jackson	8 – Martin	6 – Jackson	Pan American Center (10,007); Las Cruces, NM
January 1, 2006*; 1:00 p.m.		UTEP	W 61–60	8–6	15 – Zeno	7 – Lowhorn	3 – Tied	United Spirit Arena (7,320); Lubbock, TX
Big 12 regular season
January 7, 2006; 5:00 p.m.		at Texas A&M	L 55–63	8–7 (0–1)	21 – Jackson	8 – Zeno	7 – Dora	Reed Arena (10,389); College Station, TX
January 11, 2006; 7:00 p.m.		Baylor	W 79–61	9–7 (1–1)	22 – Jackson	12 – Lowhorn	4 – Martin	United Spirit Arena (7,859); Lubbock, TX
January 14, 2006; 7:00 p.m.		Iowa State	W 76–73	10–7 (2–1)	23 – Jackson	8 – Tied	5 – Dora	United Spirit Arena (6,727); Lubbock, TX
January 17, 2006; 8:00 p.m.		at No. 5 Texas	L 46–80	10–8 (1–2)	21 – Jackson	6 – Lowhorn	4 – Zeno	Frank Erwin Center (16,312); Austin, TX
January 21, 2006; 12:00 p.m.		at No. 25 Oklahoma	L 48–60	10–9 (1–3)	15 – Jackson	7 – Zeno	3 – Dora	Lloyd Noble Center (12,044); Norman, OK
January 28, 2006; 12:30 p.m.		Oklahoma State	W 92–90 ^{OT}	11–9 (2–3)	26 – Jackson	7 – Zeno	6 – Dora	United Spirit Arena (8,778); Lubbock, TX
January 30, 2006; 8:00 p.m.		at Kansas	L 52–86	11–10 (2–4)	17 – Jackson	7 – Lowhorn	4 – Zeno	Allen Fieldhouse (16,300); Lawrence, KS
February 4, 2006; 8:00 p.m.		Missouri	W 73–55	12–10 (3–4)	22 – Tied	12 – Jackson	6 – White	United Spirit Arena (7,655); Lubbock, TX
February 6, 2006; 8:00 p.m.		No. 6 Texas	L 44–65	12–11 (3–5)	14 – Jackson	5 – Zeno	5 – Zeno	United Spirit Arena (10,023); Lubbock, TX
February 11, 2006; 3:00 p.m.		at Colorado	L 64–66	12–12 (3–6)	18 – Jackson	8 – Zeno	7 – Jackson	Coors Events Center (8,601); Boulder, CO
February 15, 2006; 7:00 p.m.		Kansas State	W 70–56	13–12 (4–6)	16 – Plefka	11 – Zeno	4 – Tied	United Spirit Arena (6,099); Lubbock, TX
February 18, 2006; 3:00 p.m.		at Nebraska	W 70–64	14–12 (5–6)	41 – Jackson	10 – Lowhorn	5 – White	Devaney Center (12,568); Lincoln, NE
February 20, 2006; 8:00 a.m.		No. 19 Oklahoma	L 70–71	14–13 (5–7)	27 – Jackson	5 – Tied	5 – Dora	United Spirit Arena (8,424); Lubbock, TX
February 25, 2006; 12:00 p.m.		at Oklahoma State	L 63–74	14–14 (5–8)	18 – Jackson	5 – Tied	6 – Jackson	Gallagher-Iba Arena (11,254); Stillwater, OK
March 1, 2006; 7:00 p.m.		at Baylor	L 66–77	14–15 (5–9)	25 – Jackson	7 – Tied	4 – Zeno	Ferrell Center (5,818); Waco, TX
March 4, 2006; 12:30 p.m.		Texas A&M	L 59–75	14–16 (5–10)	22 – Jackson	7 – Dora	3 – Zeno	United Spirit Arena (8,378); Lubbock, TX
Big 12 tournament
March 9, 2006; 11:30 a.m.	(8)	vs. (9) Kansas State	W 73–65	15–16	21 – Jackson	9 – Dora	3 – Tied	American Airlines Center; Dallas, TX
March 10, 2006; 11:30 a.m.	(8)	vs. (1) No. 8 Texas	L 70–77	15–17	28 – Jackson	8 – Ogden	6 – Ogden	American Airlines Center; Dallas, TX
*Non-conference game. ^{#}Rankings from AP Poll. (#) Tournament seedings in parentheses. All times are in Central Time.
