= 2005–06 Nebraska Cornhuskers men's basketball team =

American college basketball season

2005–06 Nebraska Cornhuskers men's basketball

NIT, 1st round
- Conference: Big 12 Conference
- Record: 19-14 (7-9 Big 12)
- Head coach: Barry Collier
- Home arena: Bob Devaney Sports Center

2005–06 Big 12 men's basketball standings
	Conf.				Overall
Team	W		L	PCT	W		L	PCT
No. 9 Texas	13	–	3	.813	30	–	7	.811
No. 12 Kansas †	13	–	3	.813	25	–	8	.758
No. 24 Oklahoma	11	–	5	.688	20	–	9	.690
Texas A&M	10	–	6	.625	22	–	9	.710
Colorado	9	–	7	.563	20	–	10	.667
Nebraska	7	–	9	.438	19	–	14	.576
Oklahoma State	6	–	10	.375	17	–	16	.515
Texas Tech	6	–	10	.375	15	–	17	.469
Kansas State	6	–	10	.375	15	–	13	.536
Iowa State	6	–	10	.375	16	–	14	.533
Missouri	5	–	11	.313	12	–	16	.429
Baylor	4	–	12	.250	4	–	13	.235
† 2006 Big 12 Tournament winner Rankings from AP poll

The 2005–06 Nebraska Cornhuskers men's basketball team represented the University of Nebraska–Lincoln in the 2005–06 college basketball season. The Cornhuskers were coached by Barry Collier. The Cornhuskers competed in the Big 12 Conference and played their home games at the Bob Devaney Sports Center.

Nebraska lost to Florida State in the Orange Bowl Basketball Classic 74–60 on December 31, 2005.

They finished the season with a 19–14 record, losing in the Big 12 third round to Kansas 79-65 and lost in the 2006 NIT 1st round to Hofstra 73–62.
