= 2005–06 Baylor Bears basketball team =

American college basketball season

2005–06 Baylor Bears men's basketball
- Conference: Big 12
- Record: 4–13 (4–12 Big 12)
- Head coach: Scott Drew (3rd season)
- Home arena: Ferrell Center

2005–06 Big 12 men's basketball standings
	Conf.				Overall
Team	W		L	PCT	W		L	PCT
No. 9 Texas	13	–	3	.813	30	–	7	.811
No. 12 Kansas †	13	–	3	.813	25	–	8	.758
No. 24 Oklahoma	11	–	5	.688	20	–	9	.690
Texas A&M	10	–	6	.625	22	–	9	.710
Colorado	9	–	7	.563	20	–	10	.667
Nebraska	7	–	9	.438	19	–	14	.576
Oklahoma State	6	–	10	.375	17	–	16	.515
Texas Tech	6	–	10	.375	15	–	17	.469
Kansas State	6	–	10	.375	15	–	13	.536
Iowa State	6	–	10	.375	16	–	14	.533
Missouri	5	–	11	.313	12	–	16	.429
Baylor	4	–	12	.250	4	–	13	.235
† 2006 Big 12 Tournament winner Rankings from AP poll

The 2005–06 Baylor Bears men's basketball team represented the Baylor University in the 2005–06 NCAA Division I men's basketball season. The team's head coach was Scott Drew, who served in his third year. The team played its home games at the Ferrell Center in Waco, Texas as members of the Big 12 Conference. Baylor did not play its season opener until January 2006. The unusually late date for a Division I program's season opener came because the NCAA restricted them to conference games only due to the Baylor University basketball scandal.

== Schedule and results ==
Date time, TV	Rank^{#}	Opponent^{#}	Result	Record	Site (attendance) city, state
Regular season
1/11/2006; 7:00 pm		Texas Tech	L 61–79	0–1 (0-1)	United Spirit Arena (7,859); Lubbock, TX
1/14/2006; 3:00 pm		Oklahoma State	L 48–66	0–2 (0-2)	Ferrell Center (8,847); Waco, TX
1/18/2006; 7:37 pm		Colorado	L 48–81	0–3 (0-3)	Coors Events Center (3,440); Boulder, CO
1/21/2006; 3:00 pm		Texas	L 47–66	0–4 (0-4)	Ferrell Center (8,256); Waco, TX
1/25/2006; 7:08 pm		Oklahoma	L 52–82	0–5 (0-5)	Ferrell Center (5,217); Waco, TX
1/28/2006; 5:00 pm		Texas A&M	L 70–72	0–6 (0-6)	Reed Arena (11,501); College Station, TX
2/1/2006; 7:00 pm		Kansas State	W 72–70	1–6 (1-6)	Ferrell Center (4,788); Waco, TX
2/4/2006; 8:06 pm		Nebraska	L 45–60	1–7 (1-7)	Devaney Center (10,360); Lincoln, NE
2/7/2006; 7:07 pm		Missouri	W 90–64	2–7 (2-7)	Ferrell Center (4,895); Waco, TX
2/11/2006; 12:45 pm		Oklahoma	L 52–80	2–8 (2-8)	Lloyd Noble Center (11,931); Norman, OK
2/14/2006; 7:00 pm		Texas	L 63–90	2–9 (2-9)	Erwin Center (6,301); Austin, TX
2/18/2006; 12:47 pm		Texas A&M	L 60–64	2–10 (2-10)	Ferrell Center (7,254); Waco, TX
2/21/2006; 7:00 pm		Kansas	L 61–76	2–11 (2-11)	Allen Fieldhouse (16,300); Lawrence, KS
2/25/2006; 12:45 pm		Iowa State	W 91–73	3–11 (3-11)	Ferrell Center (5,782); Waco, TX
3/1/2006; 7:00 pm		Texas Tech	W 77–66	4–11 (4-11)	Ferrell Center (5,818); Waco, TX
3/4/2006; 6:08 pm		Oklahoma State	L 76–79	4–12 (4-12)	Gallagher-Iba Arena (11,930); Stillwater, OK
Big 12 tournament
3/9/2006; 2:20 pm	(12)	vs. (5) Colorado; First round	L 61–65	4–13	American Airlines Center (17,799); Dallas, TX
*Non-conference game. ^{#}Rankings from AP Poll. (#) Tournament seedings in parentheses. All times are in Central Time.
