= 2005–06 Oklahoma Sooners men's basketball team =

American college basketball season

2005–06 Oklahoma Sooners men's basketball

NCAA tournament, First Round
- Conference: Big 12 Conference

Ranking
- AP: No. 24
- Record: 20–9 (11–5 Big 12)
- Head coach: Kelvin Sampson (12th season)
- Assistant coaches: Ray Lopes; Bennie Seltzer; Jim Shaw
- Home arena: Lloyd Noble Center (Capacity: 12,000)

2005–06 Big 12 men's basketball standings
	Conf.				Overall
Team	W		L	PCT	W		L	PCT
No. 9 Texas	13	–	3	.813	30	–	7	.811
No. 12 Kansas †	13	–	3	.813	25	–	8	.758
No. 24 Oklahoma	11	–	5	.688	20	–	9	.690
Texas A&M	10	–	6	.625	22	–	9	.710
Colorado	9	–	7	.563	20	–	10	.667
Nebraska	7	–	9	.438	19	–	14	.576
Oklahoma State	6	–	10	.375	17	–	16	.515
Texas Tech	6	–	10	.375	15	–	17	.469
Kansas State	6	–	10	.375	15	–	13	.536
Iowa State	6	–	10	.375	16	–	14	.533
Missouri	5	–	11	.313	12	–	16	.429
Baylor	4	–	12	.250	4	–	13	.235
† 2006 Big 12 Tournament winner Rankings from AP poll

The 2005–06 Oklahoma Sooners men's basketball team represented the University of Oklahoma as a member of the Big 12 Conference during the 2005–06 NCAA Division I men's basketball season. The team was led by head coach Kelvin Sampson and played its home games in the Lloyd Noble Center. Oklahoma third in the Big 12 regular season standings behind Texas and Kansas. The Sooners were knocked off in the quarterfinal round of the Big 12 Conference tournament, but received an at-large bid to the NCAA tournament No. 6 seed in the Minneapolis region. The Sooners were upset in the opening round by No. 11 seed UW–Milwaukee to finish the season 20–9 (11–5 Big 12).

== Roster ==
2005–06 Oklahoma Sooners men's basketball team
Players
Coaches

Pos.	#	Name	Height	Weight	Year	Hometown
F	21	Taj Gray	6 ft 9 in (2.06 m)	238 lb (108 kg)	Sr	Wichita, Kansas
F	34	Kevin Bookout	6 ft 8 in (2.03 m)	270 lb (122 kg)	Sr	Stroud, Oklahoma
F	32	Taylor Griffin	6 ft 7 in (2.01 m)	238 lb (108 kg)	Fr	Oklahoma City, Oklahoma

Head coach

- Kelvin Sampson (UNC Pembroke)

Assistant coach(es)

Legend

- (C) Team captain
- (S) Suspended
- (I) Ineligible
- (W) Walk-on
- Injured
- Current redshirt

== Schedule and results ==
Date time, TV	Rank^{#}	Opponent^{#}	Result	Record	Site (attendance) city, state
Regular season
Nov 19, 2005*	No. 6	Samford	W 68–41	1–0	Lloyd Noble Center; Norman, Oklahoma
Nov 23, 2005*	No. 5	Binghamton	W 88–60	2–0	Lloyd Noble Center; Norman, Oklahoma
Nov 26, 2005*	No. 5	Belmont	W 81–59	3–0	Lloyd Noble Center; Norman, Oklahoma
Nov 30, 2005*	No. 5	at Tulsa	W 62–53	4–0	Tulsa, Oklahoma
Dec 3, 2005*	No. 5	at No. 4 Villanova	L 74–85	4–1	The Pavilion; Villanova, Pennsylvania
Dec 17, 2005*	No. 8	Southern	W 68–54	6–1	Lloyd Noble Center; Norman, Oklahoma
Dec 22, 2005*	No. 8	vs. West Virginia; All-College Basketball Classic	L 68–92	6–2	Ford Center; Oklahoma City, Oklahoma
Feb 27, 2006	No. 19	Oklahoma State	W 67–66	20–6 (11–4)	Lloyd Noble Center; Norman, Oklahoma
Mar 5, 2006	No. 19	at No. 6 Texas	L 48–72	20–7 (11–5)	Frank Erwin Center; Austin, Texas
Big 12 Tournament
Mar 10, 2006*	No. 22	vs. Nebraska; Quarterfinals	L 63–69	20–8	American Airlines Center; Dallas, Texas
NCAA Tournament
Mar 16, 2006*	(6 MW) No. 24	vs. (11 MW) UW–Milwaukee; First Round	L 74–82	20–9	Jacksonville Veterans Memorial Arena; Jacksonville, Florida
*Non-conference game. ^{#}Rankings from AP poll. (#) Tournament seedings in parentheses. All times are in Central Time. (#) during NCAA Tournament is seed within region MW=Midwest.
