= Josh Carter =

American basketball player (born 1986)

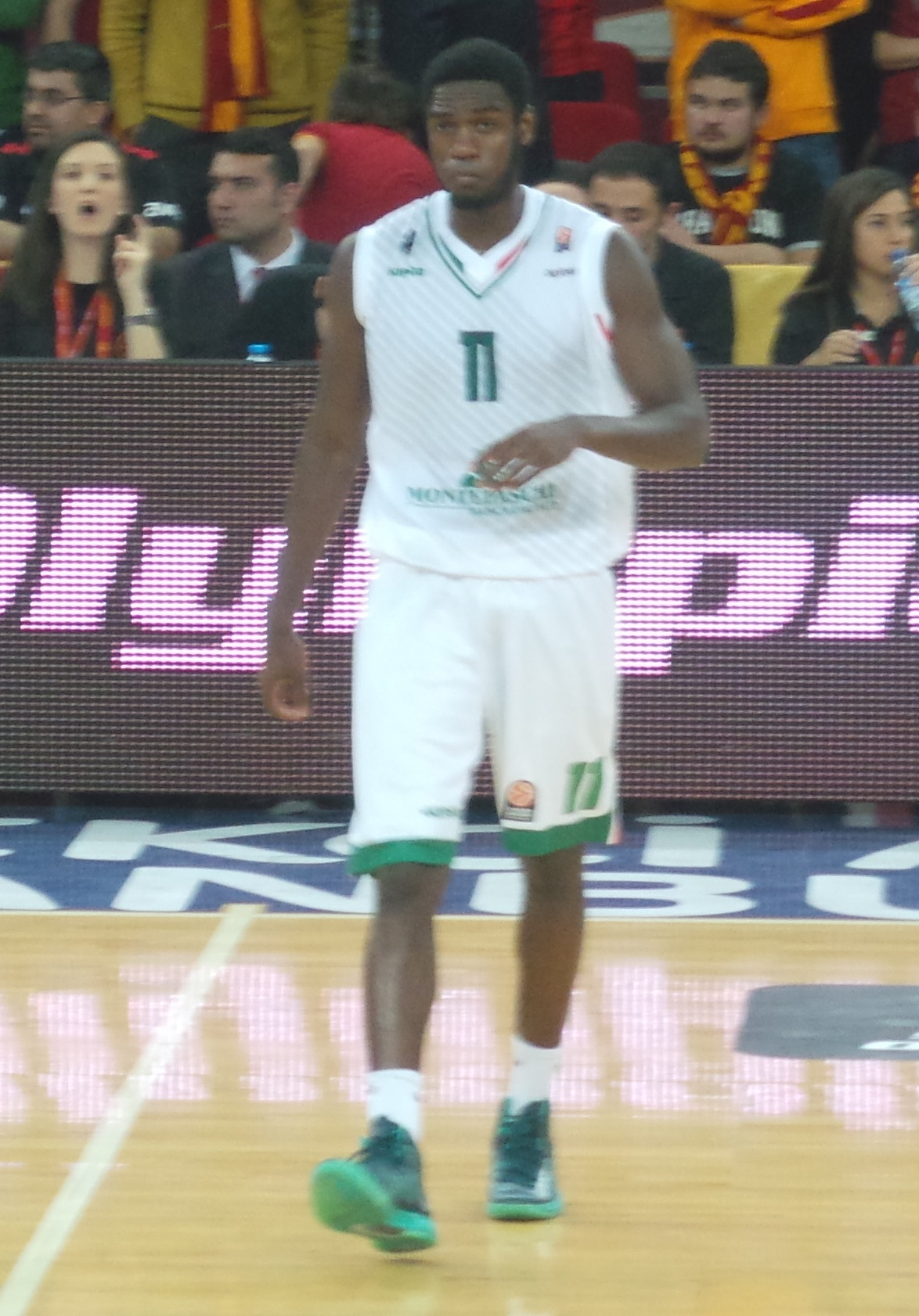
- Carter with Montepaschi Siena in 2013

Personal information
- Born: November 20, 1986 (age 39) Dallas, Texas, U.S.
- Listed height: 6 ft 7 in (2.01 m)
- Listed weight: 200 lb (91 kg)

Career information
- High school: Lake Highlands (Dallas, Texas)
- College: Texas A&M (2005–2009)
- NBA draft: 2009: undrafted
- Playing career: 2009–2022
- Position: Small forward

Career history
- 2009–2010: EWE Baskets Oldenburg
- 2010–2012: Maccabi Ashdod
- 2012–2013: Spartak Saint Petersburg
- 2013–2014: Montepaschi Siena
- 2014–2015: Türk Telekom
- 2015–2016: Pınar Karşıyaka
- 2016–2017: Dinamo Sassari
- 2017–2018: Limoges CSP
- 2019: Maccabi Ashdod
- 2019–2020: Rethymno Cretan Kings
- 2021–2022: PAOK Thessaloniki

Career highlights
- Third-team All-Big 12 (2009)

Joshua Neville Carter (born November 20, 1986) is an American former professional basketball player. He played college basketball for Texas A&M. He also played for the Athletes in Action basketball team in 2006 and 2007, helping the team win the William Jones Cup in 2006. In the 2006–07 season, Carter co-led all NCAA Division I men's basketball players with his three-point accuracy of 50%. The 98–37 team record he compiled during his college career makes him the winningest men's basketball player in the program's history.

== Early years ==
Carter was born on November 20, 1986, to Cedric and Kamela Carter in Dallas, Texas. He is the younger brother of Warren Carter, a professional basketball player, and Kevin Carter, who played for Texas A&M–Commerce.

After averaging 12.3 points and 5.6 rebounds as a junior at Lake Highlands High School, he was named to the all-district second team. As a senior, he averaged 21.3 points, 6.9 rebounds, 4.9 assists and 2.3 steals per game. He was named to the all-region and All-Greater Dallas teams and earned the district's Most Valuable Player honor. He also was named the city Player of the Year by the Richardson Morning News.

Carter was recruited by Illinois, Notre Dame, Texas Tech and Washington State. He was also recruited by Texas A&M where he signed a National Letter of Intent to play under head coach Billy Gillispie.

== College years ==
=== Freshman year ===
Carter started playing his freshman year as a true freshman, averaging 8.3 points per game and making 57 three-pointers. He scored a season-high of 25 points against Texas in the 2006 Big 12 tournament. The team earned a No. 12 seed in the 2006 NCAA tournament. In postseason play alone, he averaged 14.3 points and made 55.5 percent of his attempted three-pointers.

=== Sophomore year ===
In his sophomore year, Carter, along with Bradley University player Jeremy Crouch co-led all NCAA Division I players with his three-point field goal percentage of 50. He made a school record of 50.0 percent. He was named to the All-Big 12 Honorable Mention team in the postseason.

=== Junior year ===
He was named to the first team All-District 9 squad by the NABC coaches. He was also named to the All-Big 12 Honorable Mention team. On April 24, 2008, Carter declared for the 2008 NBA draft, but chose not to hire an agent, leaving him the option of returning for his senior season. On May 21, 2008, he withdrew his name from the draft.

=== Senior year ===
Carter scored a then-game-high of 23 points in the season opener against Arkansas – Pine Bluff. In the fourth game against UNC-Wilmington, he scored his 233rd career three-pointer, breaking the school record.

Carter scored a three-point buzzer-beater to lead his team to a 57–55 victory at Nebraska. The win helped the Aggies' hopes of reaching the NCAA tournament. Following the Nebraska game, Carter scored a career-high 29 points at home against Iowa State. After helping his team upset 12th-ranked Missouri in the final regular season game at home, Carter picked up his 97th career win, becoming the winningest player in A&M history.

He was named to the All-Big 12 Third Team after the regular season.

Carter finished his college career with 1,566 points, which at the time placed him seventh in the program's all-time points scored list. He also played 135 games during his career, which is another A&M record.

== Professional career ==
In 2009 Carter signed a contract with the German League club EWE Baskets Oldenburg of the EuroLeague through the end of the 2009–10 season. He signed with Maccabi Ashdod B.C. from the Israeli Basketball Super League for the 2010–11 and 2011–12 seasons. In 2012 Carter signed with BC Spartak Saint Petersburg of the Russian Professional Basketball League for the 2012–13 and 2013–14 seasons. Because of money problems in Spartak, Carter left the team. He signed a contract with the Italian team Montepaschi Siena in August 2013.

In the summer of 2014, he signed a contract with the Türk Telekom of Turkish Basketball League.

In the summer of 2015, he signed a contract with the Pınar Karşıyaka.

On June 20, 2016, Carter signed with Dinamo Sassari for the 2016–17 season.

On August 13, 2017, Carter signed with French club Limoges CSP.

On January 3, 2019, Carter returned to Maccabi Ashdod for a second stint, signing for the rest of the season. On March 18, 2019, Carter recorded a season-high 26 points, shooting 6-of-8 from three-point range, along with four rebounds and two assists in a 95–89 win over Hapoel Tel Aviv.

== Career statistics ==
Legend
| GP | Games played | GS | Games started | MPG | Minutes per game |
| FG% | Field-goal percentage | 3P% | 3-point field-goal percentage | FT% | Free-throw percentage |
| RPG | Rebounds per game | APG | Assists per game | SPG | Steals per game |
| BPG | Blocks per game | PPG | Points per game | PIR | Performance index rating |
| **Bold** | Career high |

=== EuroLeague ===
| Year | Team | GP | GS | MPG | FG% | 3P% | FT% | RPG | APG | SPG | BPG | PPG | PIR |
|---|---|---|---|---|---|---|---|---|---|---|---|---|---|
| 2009–10 | EWE Oldenburg | **10** | 0 | 25.2 | .347 | .326 | .609 | 2.5 | .6 | **.5** | **.3** | 7.8 | 4.9 |
| 2013–14 | Montepaschi Siena | **10** | **9** | **26.9** | **.408** | **.375** | **.800** | **3.2** | **1.5** | **.5** | .2 | **9.2** | **8.3** |
| Career | | 20 | 9 | 26.0 | .378 | .352 | .698 | 2.8 | 1.0 | .5 | .2 | 8.5 | 6.6 |

=== Domestic leagues ===
| Season | Team | League | GP | MPG | FG% | 3P% | FT% | RPG | APG | SPG | BPG | PPG |
|---|---|---|---|---|---|---|---|---|---|---|---|---|
| 2009–10 | EWE Baskets Oldenburg | German BBL | 37 | 20.4 | .542 | .317 | .756 | 2.0 | .8 | .5 | .2 | 7.7 |
| 2010–11 | Maccabi Ashdod B.C. | Ligat HaAl | 39 | 34.6 | .509 | .402 | .800 | 5.3 | 1.5 | 1.1 | .1 | 17.0 |
| 2011–12 | Maccabi Ashdod B.C. | Ligat HaAl | 30 | 35.3 | .606 | .389 | .829 | 3.9 | 1.7 | .9 | .3 | 17.4 |
| 2012–13 | BC Spartak Saint Petersburg | PBL | 15 | 24.7 | .512 | .379 | .846 | 3.1 | 1.6 | 1.0 | .3 | 9.4 |
| 2012–13 | BC Spartak Saint Petersburg | VTB United League | 21 | 27.3 | .470 | .381 | .725 | 3.3 | 1.1 | .9 | .6 | 10.5 |
| 2013–14 | Montepaschi Siena | Lega A | 46 | 26.9 | .487 | .404 | .815 | 3.2 | 1.4 | .6 | .3 | 10.8 |
| 2014–15 | Türk Telekom B.K. | TBL | 31 | 30.4 | .643 | .402 | .842 | 3.6 | 2.1 | .6 | .2 | 14.7 |
