= T. C. Roberson High School =

Public school in North Carolina, United States

T.C. Roberson High School

Location
- 250 Overlook Rd; Asheville, North Carolina 28803; United States; 35°29′10″N 82°32′06″W

Information
- School type: Public
- Established: 1962 (64 years ago)
- School district: Buncombe County Schools System
- CEEB code: 343630
- Principal: Nathan Allison
- Teaching staff: 85.62 (FTE)
- Enrollment: 1,479 (2024-2025)
- Student to teacher ratio: 17.27
- Campus size: 261,000 sq.ft.
- Campus type: Suburban
- Colors: Navy Blue and Vegas Gold
- Team name: Rams
- Website: tcrhs.buncombeschools.org

T.C. Roberson High School is a high school in Asheville, North Carolina. It is a part of the Buncombe County Schools System.

== History ==
T.C. Roberson High School was established in 1962, when Valley Springs High School and Biltmore High School were combined to form one high school. It is named for Thomas Crawford Roberson (1901–1978), a former Superintendent of Buncombe County Schools and the architect of the consolidation of the former 21 Buncombe County high schools into the 6 Buncombe County high schools that exist today. Its school newspaper is the Golden Fleece. It has two feeder schools – Valley Springs Middle School and half of the students at Cane Creek Middle School.

== Overview ==
T.C. Roberson is located right by W.W. Estes Elementary School, Valley Springs Middle School, as well as Charles T. Koontz Intermediate School, making it a convenient location for both parents and students. Roberson is also home to the Progressive Education Program (PEP) which is a program dedicated to students with both mental and physical disabilities. The PEP program allows these students to attend school and have the same opportunities as any other student, such as having gym class, art class, math and reading lessons, and getting to meet and interact with classmates. The current principal of the PEP program is Thea Wilson.

== Athletics ==
T.C. Roberson High School is a member of the North Carolina High School Athletic Association (NCHSAA). The school's team name is the Rams, with the school colors being blue and gold.

T.C. Roberson's main rivals in athletics in the Asheville area are A.C. Reynolds High School and Asheville High School. The school is well known for being a powerhouse in basketball, soccer, cross country, swimming, tennis, and baseball.

In 2025, the T.C. Roberson baseball team won its third consecutive NCHSAA 4A state championship, making them the first NCHSAA 4A (North Carolina's former highest classification for high school athletics) baseball team to accomplish a three-peat. This also marked the school's seventh baseball state championship overall. In total, T.C. Roberson has had four alumni play Major League Baseball, with 20 former T.C. Roberson baseball players having been drafted in the MLB draft.

== Notable alumni ==
=== Athletics ===
- Logan Allen — MLB pitcher
- Josh Bonifay — former professional baseball player and coach
- Braxton Davidson — baseball player, Atlanta Braves
- Darren Holmes — former MLB pitcher and 1998 World Series champion with the New York Yankees
- Joel McKeithan — MLB coach
- Cameron Maybin — MLB player and 2017 World Series champion with the Houston Astros
- Christian Moody — former Kansas Jayhawks basketball player
- Chris Narveson — former MLB pitcher
- David Testo — professional soccer player with the Columbus Crew, Vancouver Whitecaps, and Montreal Impact
- Roy Williams — retired men's basketball head coach at the University of Kansas and the University of North Carolina at Chapel Hill

=== Other ===
- Judy Clarke — attorney, anti-death penalty advocate
- Michael McFee — poet and essayist
- Riley Howell — killed while tackling shooter at 2019 University of North Carolina at Charlotte shooting
- Robert A. Phillips — George R. Gardiner Professor of Business Ethics, Schulich School of Business, York University
