= 2005–06 Kansas Jayhawks men's basketball team =

American college basketball season

2005–06 Kansas Jayhawks men's basketball

Big 12 tournament champions Big 12 regular season co-champions

NCAA Tournament, Round of 64
- Conference: Big 12 Conference

Ranking
- Coaches: No. 22
- AP: No. 12
- Record: 25–8 (13–3 Big 12)
- Head coach: Bill Self (3rd Season)
- Assistant coaches: Joe Dooley (3rd season); Tim Jankovich (3rd season); Kurtis Townsend (2nd season)
- Captains: Jeff Hawkins; Christian Moody; Stephen Vinson
- Home arena: Allen Fieldhouse

2005–06 Big 12 men's basketball standings
	Conf.				Overall
Team	W		L	PCT	W		L	PCT
No. 9 Texas	13	–	3	.813	30	–	7	.811
No. 12 Kansas †	13	–	3	.813	25	–	8	.758
No. 24 Oklahoma	11	–	5	.688	20	–	9	.690
Texas A&M	10	–	6	.625	22	–	9	.710
Colorado	9	–	7	.563	20	–	10	.667
Nebraska	7	–	9	.438	19	–	14	.576
Oklahoma State	6	–	10	.375	17	–	16	.515
Texas Tech	6	–	10	.375	15	–	17	.469
Kansas State	6	–	10	.375	15	–	13	.536
Iowa State	6	–	10	.375	16	–	14	.533
Missouri	5	–	11	.313	12	–	16	.429
Baylor	4	–	12	.250	4	–	13	.235
† 2006 Big 12 Tournament winner Rankings from AP poll

The 2005–06 Kansas Jayhawks men's basketball team represented the University of Kansas Jayhawks for the NCAA Division I men's intercollegiate basketball season of 2005–06. The team was led by Bill Self in his third season as head coach. The team played its home games in Allen Fieldhouse in Lawrence, Kansas.

In 2005–06 the Jayhawks fielded one of the youngest teams in the nation, by the end of the year the starting line-up consisted of 3 Freshmen and 2 Sophomores. After some early season struggles, the Jayhawks finished the season with thirteen conference wins, good enough for their second straight season in which the team had claimed a share of the championship. Bill Self was named Big 12 Coach of the Year for the first time. In postseason play the team defeated its conference opponents to claim its first Big 12 Championship title since 1999. In the NCAA Division I tournament, the fourth-seeded Jayhawks were defeated in the first round by Bradley, a 13 seed.

== Recruiting ==
College recruiting information
Name	Hometown	School	Height	Weight	Commit date
Mario Chalmers; PG	Anchorage, AK	Bartlett HS	6 ft 2 in (1.88 m)	180 lb (82 kg)	May 19, 2004
Mario Chalmers; PG	Recruit ratings: Scout: Rivals: (N/A)				
Micah Downs; SF	Kirkland, WA	Juanita HS	6 ft 8 in (2.03 m)	190 lb (86 kg)	May 17, 2004
Micah Downs; SF	Recruit ratings: Scout: Rivals: (N/A)				
Brandon Rush; PG	Kansas City, MO	Mt. Zion Christian Academy (Durham, NC)	6 ft 6 in (1.98 m)	200 lb (91 kg)	Sep 2, 2005
Brandon Rush; PG	Recruit ratings: Scout: Rivals: (N/A)				
Julian Wright; SF	Flossmoor, IL	Homewood-Flossmoor HS	6 ft 8 in (2.03 m)	200 lb (91 kg)	Sep 10, 2004
Julian Wright; SF	Recruit ratings: Scout: Rivals: (N/A)				
Overall recruit ranking: Scout: 1 Rivals: 4 ESPN: N/A
Note: In many cases, Scout, Rivals, 247Sports, On3, and ESPN may conflict in their listings of height and weight.; In these cases, the average was taken. ESPN grades are on a 100-point scale.; Sources: "Kansas 2005 Basketball Commitments". Rivals.; "2005 Kansas Basketball Commits". Scout.; "ESPN". ESPN.; "Scout.com Team Recruiting Rankings". Scout.; "2005 Team Ranking". Rivals.

=== Transfers ===
College recruiting information
Name	Hometown	School	Height	Weight	Commit date
Rodrick Stewart; G	Seattle, WA	Rainier Beach HS	6 ft 4 in (1.93 m)	201 lb (91 kg)	Transfer
Rodrick Stewart; G	Recruit ratings: Scout: Rivals: (N/A)				

== Roster ==
Name	#	Position	Height	Weight	Year	Home Town
Jeremy Case	10	Guard	6–1	170	Sophomore	McAlester, OK
Mario Chalmers	15	Guard	6–1	182	Freshman	Anchorage, AK
C.J. Giles	33	Center	6–10	235	Sophomore	Seattle, WA
Jeff Hawkins	1	Guard	5–11	180	Senior	Kansas City, KS
Darnell Jackson	32	Forward	6–8	240	Sophomore	Oklahoma City, OK
Sasha Kaun	24	Center	6–11	246	Sophomore	Tomsk, Russia
Matt Kleinmann	54	Center	6–10	237	Freshman	Overland Park, KS
Christian Moody	34	Forward	6–8	220	Senior	Asheville, NC
Russell Robinson	3	Guard	6–1	196	Sophomore	New York City, NY
Brandon Rush	25	Guard	6–6	202	Freshman	Kansas City, MO
Rodrick Stewart	5	Guard	6–4	201	Sophomore	Seattle, WA
Stephen Vinson	20	Guard	6–2	195	Senior	Lawrence, KS
Julian Wright	30	Forward	6–8	218	Freshman	Chicago Heights, IL

== Schedule ==
Date time, TV	Rank^{#}	Opponent^{#}	Result	Record	Site (attendance) city, state
Exhibition
2005/11/09*; 7:00 p.m., J-TV		Fort Hays State	W 96–62		Allen Fieldhouse (16,300); Lawrence, Kansas
2005/11/14*; 7:00 p.m., J-TV		Pittsburg State	W 73–47		Allen Fieldhouse (16,300); Lawrence, Kansas
Regular season
2005/11/18*; 7:00 p.m., J-TV		Idaho State	W 90–66	1–0	Allen Fieldhouse (16,300); Lawrence, Kansas
2005/11/21*; 8:00 p.m., ESPN		vs. No. 10 Arizona; EA Sports Maui Invitational Quarterfinals	L 49–61	1–1	Lahaina Civic Center (2,400); Lahaina, Hawaii
2005/11/22*; 3:00 p.m., ESPNU		vs. Arkansas; EA Sports Maui Invitational Consolation Game	L 64–65	1–2	Lahaina Civic Center (2,400); Lahaina, Hawaii
2005/11/23*; 6:00 p.m., ESPNU		vs. Chaminade; EA Sports Maui Invitational 7th Place Game	W 102–54	2–2	Lahaina Civic Center (2,400); Lahaina, Hawaii
2005/12/01*; 8:00 p.m., ESPN2		No. 20 Nevada	L 70–72	2–3	Allen Fieldhouse (16,300); Lawrence, Kansas
2005/12/03*; 7:00 p.m., J-TV		Western Illinois	W 86–57	3–3	Allen Fieldhouse (16,300); Lawrence, Kansas
2005/12/06*; 6:00 p.m., ESPN		vs. Saint Joseph's; Jimmy V Classic	L 67–70	3–4	Madison Square Garden (10,967); New York, New York
2005/12/10*; 11:00 a.m., ESPN		vs. California	W 69–56	4–4	Kemper Arena (16,180); Kansas City, Missouri
2005/12/19*; 6:00 p.m., ESPN2		Pepperdine	W 63–43	5–4	Allen Fieldhouse (16,300); Lawrence, Kansas
2005/12/22*; 7:00 p.m., J-TV		Northern Colorado	W 85–62	6–4	Allen Fieldhouse (16,300); Lawrence, Kansas
2005/12/29*; 6:30 p.m., ESPN2		New Orleans	W 73–56	7–4	Allen Fieldhouse (16,300); Lawrence, Kansas
2006/01/04*; 7:00 p.m., J-TV		Yale	W 87–46	8–4	Allen Fieldhouse (16,300); Lawrence, Kansas
2006/01/07*; 11:00 a.m., ESPN		No. 19 Kentucky	W 73–46	9–4	Allen Fieldhouse (16,300); Lawrence, Kansas
2006/01/11; 8:00 p.m., J-TV		at Colorado	W 75–63	10–4	Coors Events Center (10,586); Boulder, Colorado
2006/01/14; 12:45 p.m., ESPN+		Kansas State	L 55–59	10–5	Allen Fieldhouse (16,300); Lawrence, Kansas
2006/01/16; 6:00 p.m., ESPN		at Missouri	L 86–89 ^{OT}	10–6	Mizzou Arena (15,061); Columbia, Missouri
2006/01/21; 3:00 p.m., ESPN		Nebraska	W 96–54	11–6	Allen Fieldhouse (16,300); Lawrence, Kansas
2006/01/25; 7:00 p.m., J-TV		at Texas A&M	W 83–73	12–6	Reed Arena (12,110); College Station, Texas
2006/01/28; 11:00 a.m., ESPN		at Iowa State	W 95–85	13–6	Hilton Coliseum (14,092); Ames, Iowa
2006/01/30; 8:00 p.m., ESPN2		Texas Tech	W 86–52	14–6	Allen Fieldhouse (16,300); Lawrence, Kansas
2006/02/05; 12:00 p.m., CBS		No. 19 Oklahoma	W 59–58	15–6	Allen Fieldhouse (16,300); Lawrence, Kansas
2006/02/08; 6:30 p.m., J-TV		at Nebraska	W 69–48	16–6	Bob Devaney Sports Center (13,055); Lincoln, Nebraska
2006/02/11; 3:00 p.m., ESPN+		Iowa State	W 88–75	17–6	Allen Fieldhouse (16,300); Lawrence, Kansas
2006/02/13; 8:00 p.m., ESPN	No. 22	at Oklahoma State	W 64–49	18–6	Gallagher-Iba Arena (12,242); Stillwater, Oklahoma
2006/02/18; 2:45 p.m., CBS	No. 22	Missouri	W 79–46	19–6	Allen Fieldhouse (16,300); Lawrence, Kansas
2006/02/21; 7:00 p.m., J-TV	No. 16	Baylor	W 76–61	20–6	Allen Fieldhouse (16,300); Lawrence, Kansas
2006/02/25; 8:00 p.m., ESPN	No. 16	at No. 7 Texas	L 55–80	20–7	Frank Erwin Center (16,755); Austin, Texas
2006/03/01; 7:00 p.m., J-TV	No. 18	Colorado	W 75–54	21–7	Allen Fieldhouse (16,300); Lawrence, Kansas
2006/03/04; 3:00 p.m., ESPN+	No. 18	at Kansas State	W 66–52	22–7	Bramlage Coliseum (13,340); Manhattan, Kansas
Big 12 tournament
2006/03/10; 6:00 p.m.	No. 17	vs. Oklahoma State; Quarterfinals	W 63–62	23–7	American Airlines Center (18,892); Dallas, Texas
2006/03/11; 3:20 p.m.	No. 17	vs. Nebraska; Semifinals	W 79–65	24–7	American Airlines Center (18,999); Dallas, Texas
2006/03/12; 2:00 p.m.	No. 17	vs. No. 8 Texas; Championship	W 80–68	25–7	American Airlines Center (17,458); Dallas, Texas
NCAA tournament
2006/03/17; 8:30 p.m., CBS	No. 12 (4)	vs. No. (13) Bradley; First Round	L 73–77	25–8	The Palace of Auburn Hills (19,400); Auburn Hills, Michigan
*Non-conference game. ^{#}Rankings from AP Poll. (#) Tournament seedings in parentheses. All times are in Central Standard Time.
