= 2005–06 Iowa State Cyclones men's basketball team =

American college basketball season

2005–06 Iowa State Cyclones men's basketball
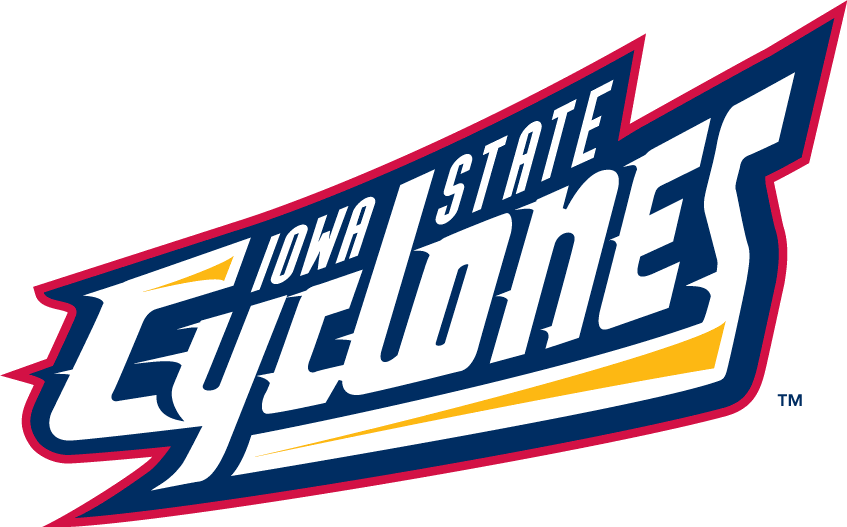
- Conference: Big 12 Conference
- Record: 16-14 (6-10 Big 12)
- Head coach: Wayne Morgan (3rd season)
- Assistant coach: Damon Archibald
- Home arena: Hilton Coliseum

2005–06 Big 12 men's basketball standings
	Conf.				Overall
Team	W		L	PCT	W		L	PCT
No. 9 Texas	13	–	3	.813	30	–	7	.811
No. 12 Kansas †	13	–	3	.813	25	–	8	.758
No. 24 Oklahoma	11	–	5	.688	20	–	9	.690
Texas A&M	10	–	6	.625	22	–	9	.710
Colorado	9	–	7	.563	20	–	10	.667
Nebraska	7	–	9	.438	19	–	14	.576
Oklahoma State	6	–	10	.375	17	–	16	.515
Texas Tech	6	–	10	.375	15	–	17	.469
Kansas State	6	–	10	.375	15	–	13	.536
Iowa State	6	–	10	.375	16	–	14	.533
Missouri	5	–	11	.313	12	–	16	.429
Baylor	4	–	12	.250	4	–	13	.235
† 2006 Big 12 Tournament winner Rankings from AP poll

The 2005–06 Iowa State Cyclones men's basketball team represented Iowa State University during the 2005–06 NCAA Division I men's basketball season. The Cyclones were coached by Wayne Morgan, who was in his third season. They played their home games at Hilton Coliseum in Ames, Iowa and competed in the Big 12 Conference.

== Previous season ==
The Cyclones finished 19–12, 9–7 in Big 12 play to finish 5th in the regular season conference standings. They lost to Texas Tech in the quarterfinals of the Big 12 tournament. They received an at-large bid to the NCAA tournament, where they defeated Minnesota and lost to North Carolina.

=== Offseason departures ===
Offseason departures
Name	Position	Reason
Jared Homan	Center	Graduated
Damion Staple	Forward	Graduated
Dave Braet	Guard	Graduated
Robert Faulkner	Forward	Dismissed from team
Aaron Agnew	Center	Transferred to Highland CC
Reggie George	Center	Transferred to Robert Morris (IL)

== Recruiting ==
College recruiting
Name	Hometown	School	Height	Weight	Commit date
Farnold Degand; PG	Boston	O'Bryant	6 ft 3 in (1.91 m)	165 lb (75 kg)	Aug 20, 2004
Farnold Degand; PG	Recruit ratings: Scout: Rivals: 247Sports:				
Mike Evanovich; SF	Storrs, Connecticut	South Kent Prep	6 ft 8 in (2.03 m)	230 lb (100 kg)	Jan 30, 2005
Mike Evanovich; SF	Recruit ratings: Scout: Rivals: 247Sports:				
Shawn Taggart; PF	Richmond, Virginia	Mount Zion Christian Academy	6 ft 10 in (2.08 m)	225 lb (102 kg)	Oct 1, 2004
Shawn Taggart; PF	Recruit ratings: Scout: Rivals: 247Sports:				
Jessan Gray; PF	Davenport, Iowa	Tyler JC	6 ft 10 in (2.08 m)	200 lb (91 kg)	Apr 18, 2005
Jessan Gray; PF	Recruit ratings: Scout: Rivals: 247Sports:				
Ross Marsden; PF	Ames, Iowa	Ames High	6 ft 10 in (2.08 m)	210 lb (95 kg)	Apr 22, 2004
Ross Marsden; PF	Recruit ratings: Scout: Rivals: 247Sports:				
Jiri Hubalek; C	Prague	Marshalltown CC	6 ft 11 in (2.11 m)	205 lb (93 kg)	Mar 28, 2005
Jiri Hubalek; C	Recruit ratings: Scout: Rivals: 247Sports:				
Overall recruit ranking: 247Sports: 47
Note: In many cases, Scout, Rivals, 247Sports, On3, and ESPN may conflict in their listings of height and weight.; In these cases, the average was taken. ESPN grades are on a 100-point scale.; Sources: "Iowa State 2005 Basketball Commitments". Rivals.; "2005 Iowa State Basketball Commits". Scout.; "ESPN". ESPN.; "Scout.com Team Recruiting Rankings". Scout.; "2005 Team Ranking". Rivals.

== Roster ==
2005–06 Iowa State Cyclones men's basketball team
Players
Coaches

Pos.	#	Name	Height	Weight	Year	Previous school	Hometown
F	0	Shawn Taggart	6 ft 10 in (2.08 m)	225 lb (102 kg)	Fr	Mount Zion Christian Academy	Richmond, Virginia
G	1	Curtis Stinson (C)	6 ft 2 in (1.88 m)	205 lb (93 kg)	Jr	Winchendon Prep	The Bronx
G	2	Brock Jacobson	6 ft 2 in (1.88 m)	185 lb (84 kg)	Fr	Webster City High	Webster City, Iowa
G	3	John Neal	6 ft 3 in (1.91 m)	180 lb (82 kg)	Sr	Winterset High	Winterset, Iowa
G	10	Tasheed Carr	6 ft 4 in (1.93 m)	205 lb (93 kg)	So	Mount Zion Christian Academy	Philadelphia, Pennsylvania
G	11	Will Blalock (C)	5 ft 11 in (1.8 m)	185 lb (84 kg)	Jr	Notre Dame Prep	Boston
G	12	Farnold Degand	6 ft 3 in (1.91 m)	165 lb (75 kg)	Fr	O'Bryant	Boston
F	13	Rahshon Clark	6 ft 6 in (1.98 m)	190 lb (86 kg)	So	Bridgton Academy	Queens, New York
G	21	Mark Currie	6 ft 4 in (1.93 m)	205 lb (93 kg)	RS So	Nebraska-Omaha	Odebolt, Iowa
G	23	Chris Ceaser	6 ft 3 in (1.91 m)	185 lb (84 kg)	Jr	Nimitz High	Humble, Texas
F	24	Anthony Davis	6 ft 5 in (1.96 m)	220 lb (100 kg)	RS Sr	Los Angeles City College	Compton, California
F	25	Jessan Gray	6 ft 10 in (2.08 m)	200 lb (91 kg)	Jr	Tyler JC	Davenport, Iowa
F	31	Dustin Streff (redshirt)	6 ft 7 in (2.01 m)	245 lb (111 kg)	RS Sr	NIACC	Orange City, Iowa
C	33	Jiri Hubalek	6 ft 11 in (2.11 m)	205 lb (93 kg)	RS So	Marshalltown CC	Prague
F	34	Jeff Bergstrom	6 ft 4 in (1.93 m)	190 lb (86 kg)	Jr	Kingwood High	Kingwood, Texas
C	40	Ross Marsden	6 ft 10 in (2.08 m)	210 lb (95 kg)	Fr	Ames High	Ames, Iowa
F	41	Mike Evanovich	6 ft 8 in (2.03 m)	230 lb (104 kg)	Fr	South Kent Prep	Storrs, Connecticut

Head coach

- Wayne Morgan (St. Lawrence)

Assistant coach(es)

- Damon Archibald (Boise State)

Legend

- (C) Team captain
- (S) Suspended
- (I) Ineligible
- (W) Walk-on
- Injured
- Current redshirt

== Schedule and results ==
Date time, TV	Rank^{#}	Opponent^{#}	Result	Record	Site city, state
Exhibition
November 5, 2005*; 8:00 pm	No. 23	EA Sports	L 57-64		Hilton Coliseum; Ames, Iowa
November 11, 2005*; 8:00 pm	No. 23	Bemidji State; Exhibition	W 84-77		Hilton Coliseum; Ames, Iowa
Regular season
November 20, 2005*; 5:00 pm, Cyclone Television Network	No. 23	Mountain State	W 101-82	1-0	Hilton Coliseum; Ames, Iowa
November 23, 2005*; 8:00 pm, Mediacom Connections	No. 23	Portland State; Cyclone Challenge	W 72-64	2-0	Hilton Coliseum; Ames, Iowa
November 25, 2005*; 8:00 pm, Cyclone Television Network	No. 23	Howard; Cyclone Challenge	W 96-62	3-0	Hilton Coliseum; Ames, Iowa
November 26, 2005*; 8:00 pm, Mediacom Connections	No. 23	Iona; Cyclone Challenge	L 72-89	3-1	Hilton Coliseum; Ames, Iowa
November 29, 2005*; 7:00 pm, Cyclone Television Network		Northern Iowa; Iowa Big Four	W 68-61	4-1	Hilton Coliseum; Ames, Iowa
December 3, 2005*; 7:00 pm, Cyclone Television Network		Fresno State	L 77-84	4-2	Hilton Coliseum; Ames, Iowa
December 5, 2005*; 7:00 pm, KDSM/KFXA		at Drake	W 89-74	5-2	Knapp Center; Des Moines, Iowa
December 9, 2005*; 7:00 pm, Cyclone Television Network		No. 12 Iowa; Hy-Vee Cy-Hawk Series	W 72-60	6-2	Hilton Coliseum; Ames, Iowa
December 17, 2005*; 7:00 pm, ESPN2		vs. No. 25 Ohio State; Mediacom Cyclone Capital Classic	L 67-70	6-3	Wells Fargo Arena (Des Moines, Iowa); Des Moines, Iowa
December 21, 2005*; 11:30 pm, Hawaiiantelmedia.com		vs. South Florida; Rainbow Classic	W 83-74	7-3	Stan Sheriff Center; Honolulu, HI
December 22, 2005*; 9:00 pm		vs. Northwestern State; Rainbow Classic	W 81-77 ^{2OT}	8-3	Stan Sheriff Center; Honolulu, HI
December 23, 2005*; 11:30 pm		vs. Colorado State; Rainbow Classic	W 87-80	9-3	Stan Sheriff Center; Honolulu, HI
December 28, 2005*; 7:00 pm, Cyclone Television Network		Tennessee State	W 59-51	10-3	Hilton Coliseum; Ames, Iowa
January 7, 2006; 7:00 pm, ESPN Plus		Kansas State	W 72-70	11-3 (1-0)	Hilton Coliseum; Ames, Iowa
January 9, 2006; 8:00 pm, ESPN		No. 8 Texas	L 58-78	11-4 (1-1)	Hilton Coliseum; Ames, Iowa
January 14, 2006; 12:30 pm, ESPN		at Texas Tech	L 73-76	11-5 (1-2)	United Spirit Arena; Lubbock, Texas
January 17, 2006; 6:30 pm, Cyclone Television Network		at Nebraska	W 88-75	12-5 (2-2)	Bob Devaney Sports Center; Lincoln, Nebraska
January 21, 2006; 12:45 pm, ESPN Plus		Texas A&M	L 81-86 ^{OT}	12-6 (2-3)	Hilton Coliseum; Ames, Iowa
January 25, 2006; 7:00 pm, Cyclone Television Network		at Missouri	W 82-58	13-6 (3-3)	Hearnes Center; Columbia, Missouri
January 28, 2006; 12:00 pm, ESPN		Kansas	L 85-95	13-7 (3-4)	Hilton Coliseum; Ames, Iowa
February 5, 2006; 1:00 pm, ESPN Plus		No. 25 Colorado	W 96-79	14-7 (4-4)	Hilton Coliseum; Ames, Iowa
February 8, 2006; 6:30 pm, Cyclone Television Network		at Kansas State	L 63-66	14-8 (4-5)	Bramlage Coliseum; Manhattan, Kansas
February 11, 2006; 3:00 pm, ESPN Plus		at Kansas	L 75-88	14-9 (4-6)	Allen Fieldhouse; Lawrence, Kansas
February 15, 2006; 7:00 pm, Cyclone Television Network		Nebraska	L 63-73	14-10 (4-7)	Hilton Coliseum; Ames, Iowa
February 18, 2006; 12:00 pm, ABC		at Oklahoma	L 82-83	14-11 (4-8)	Lloyd Noble Center; Norman, Oklahoma
February 22, 2006; 8:00 pm, ESPN Plus		Oklahoma State	W 68-52	15-11 (5-8)	Hilton Coliseum; Ames, Iowa
February 25, 2006; 12:45 pm, ESPN Plus		at Baylor	L 73-91	15-12 (5-9)	Ferrell Center; Waco, Texas
February 28, 2006; 7:00 pm, Cyclone Television Network		Missouri	W 85-78	16-12 (6-9)	Hilton Coliseum; Ames, Iowa
March 4, 2006; 8:00 pm, Cyclone Television Network		at Colorado	L 82-84	16-13 (6-10)	Coors Events Center; Boulder, Colorado
Big 12 Tournament
March 9, 2006; 6:00 pm, ESPNU		vs. Oklahoma State; Big 12 tournament First round	L 70-79	16-14 (6-10)	American Airlines Center; Dallas
*Non-conference game. ^{#}Rankings from AP poll. (#) Tournament seedings in parentheses. All times are in Central Time.

== Awards and honors ==
- All-Conference Selections

Curtis Stinson (1st Team)
Will Blalock (3rd Team)

- Ralph A. Olsen Award

Curtis Stinson (2006)
Will Blalock (2006)
