= 2005–06 Texas Longhorns men's basketball team =

American college basketball season

2005–06 Texas Longhorns men's basketball

Big 12 regular season co-champions

NCAA tournament, Elite Eight
- Conference: Big 12

Ranking
- Coaches: No. 9
- AP: No. 9
- Record: 30–7 (13–3 Big 12)
- Head coach: Rick Barnes (8th season)
- Home arena: Frank Erwin Center

2005–06 Big 12 men's basketball standings
	Conf.				Overall
Team	W		L	PCT	W		L	PCT
No. 9 Texas	13	–	3	.813	30	–	7	.811
No. 12 Kansas †	13	–	3	.813	25	–	8	.758
No. 24 Oklahoma	11	–	5	.688	20	–	9	.690
Texas A&M	10	–	6	.625	22	–	9	.710
Colorado	9	–	7	.563	20	–	10	.667
Nebraska	7	–	9	.438	19	–	14	.576
Oklahoma State	6	–	10	.375	17	–	16	.515
Texas Tech	6	–	10	.375	15	–	17	.469
Kansas State	6	–	10	.375	15	–	13	.536
Iowa State	6	–	10	.375	16	–	14	.533
Missouri	5	–	11	.313	12	–	16	.429
Baylor	4	–	12	.250	4	–	13	.235
† 2006 Big 12 Tournament winner Rankings from AP poll

The 2005–06 Texas Longhorns men's basketball team represented The University of Texas at Austin in NCAA Division I intercollegiate men's basketball competition as a member of the Big 12 Conference. The 2005–06 team shared the Big 12 championship, won a then-school-record 30 games, and reached the Elite Eight of the 2006 NCAA tournament.

== Roster ==
	#	Position	Height	Weight	Year	Home Town
A.J. Abrams	5	Guard	5–10	155	Freshman	Austin, Texas
LaMarcus Aldridge	23	Forward	6–10	237	Sophomore	Seagoville, Texas
Connor Atchley	32	Center	6–9	225	Freshman	Clear Lake (Houston), Texas
Bradley Buckman	22	Forward	6-8	235	Senior	Austin, Texas
Dion Dowell	3	Forward	6–6	205	Sophomore	Texas City, Texas
Daniel Gibson	1	Guard	6–2	190	Sophomore	Houston, Texas
J.D. Lewis	4	Guard	6–1	180	Sophomore	Amarillo, Texas
Kenton Paulino	12	Guard	6–1	185	Senior	Pittsfield, Maine
P. J. Tucker	2	Forward	6–5	225	Junior	Raleigh, North Carolina
Mike Williams	40	Forward	6–7	230	Sophomore	Camden, Alabama
Craig Winder	30	Guard	6–2	190	Junior	Salisbury, Maryland

== Recruiting ==
College recruiting information
Name	Hometown	School	Height	Weight	Commit date
A.J. Abrams; SG	Austin, Texas	McNeil HS	5 ft 10 in (1.78 m)	145 lb (66 kg)	Aug 4, 2003
A.J. Abrams; SG	Recruit ratings: Scout: Rivals:				
J.D. Lewis; SG	Midland, Texas	Midland HS	6 ft 2 in (1.88 m)	182 lb (83 kg)	Apr 18, 2005
J.D. Lewis; SG	Recruit ratings: Scout: Rivals:				
Craig Winder; SG	North East, Maryland	Cecil HS	6 ft 2 in (1.88 m)	190 lb (86 kg)	Apr 11, 2005
Craig Winder; SG	Recruit ratings: Scout: Rivals:				
Overall recruit ranking: Scout: NR Rivals: NR
Note: In many cases, Scout, Rivals, 247Sports, On3, and ESPN may conflict in their listings of height and weight.; In these cases, the average was taken. ESPN grades are on a 100-point scale.; Sources: "Texas 2005 Basketball Commitments". Rivals.; "2005 Texas Basketball Commits". Scout.; "ESPN". ESPN.; "Scout.com Team Recruiting Rankings". Scout.; "2005 Team Ranking". Rivals.

== Schedule ==
Date	Time^{†}	Opponent^{#}	Rank^{#}	Site	TV	Home Attendance	Result	Record
Exhibition Games
Wed, Nov 2	7 p.m.	St. Mary's	#2	Frank Erwin Center • Austin, Texas			W 113–49	(1–0 exhib.)
Wed, Nov 9	7 p.m.	Lenoir-Rhyne	#2	Frank Erwin Center • Austin, Texas			W 97–36	(2–0 exhib.)
Regular season
Tue, Nov 15	7:30 p.m.	Southern	#2	Frank Erwin Center • Austin, Texas (Guardians Classic First round)		10483	W 89–56	1–0
Wed, Nov 16	7:30 p.m.	Samford	#2	Frank Erwin Center • Austin, Texas (Guardians Classic Second Round)	ESPNU	9510	W 77–33	2–0
Mon, Nov 21	6 p.m.	vs. #13 West Virginia	#2	Municipal Auditorium • Kansas City, Missouri (Guardians Classic Semifinals)	ESPN2		W 76–75	3–0
Tue, Nov 22	9 p.m.	vs. #18 Iowa	#2	Municipal Auditorium • Kansas City, Missouri (Guardians Classic Championship Game)	ESPN2		W 68–59	4–0
Sat, Nov 26	5 p.m.	Louisiana-Monroe	#2	Frank Erwin Center • Austin, Texas	FSNSW (Texas)	11411	W 90–55	5–0
Tue, Nov 29	7 p.m.	Texas-Pan American	#2	Frank Erwin Center • Austin, Texas	FSNSW (Texas)	9340	W 82–54	6–0
Sat, Dec 3	5 p.m.	Texas-Arlington	#2	Frank Erwin Center • Austin, Texas	FSNSW (Texas)	10502	W 93–55	7–0
Mon, Dec 5	7 p.m.	@ Rice	#2	Toyota Center • Houston, Texas	FSNSW (Texas)		W 85–58	8–0
Sat, Dec 10	12:30 p.m.	vs. #1 Duke	#2	Continental Airlines Arena • East Rutherford, New Jersey	CBS		L 66–97	8–1
Sat, Dec 17	1 p.m.	Tennessee	#6	Frank Erwin Center • Austin, Texas	ESPN	13682	L 78–95	8–2
Thu, Dec 22	7 p.m.	Texas State	#15	Frank Erwin Center • Austin, Texas	FSNSW (Texas)	12373	W 85–49	9–2
Fri, Dec 30	7 p.m.	Prairie View A&M	#15	Frank Erwin Center • Austin, Texas	FSNSW (Texas)	10900	W 110–38	10–2
Mon, Jan 2	1:30 p.m.	@ #4 Memphis	#15	FedEx Forum • Memphis, Tennessee	ESPN		W 69–58	11–2
Sat, Jan 7	3 p.m.	Colorado*	#15	Frank Erwin Center • Austin, Texas	ESPN Plus	14168	W 89–64	12–2 (1–0 Big 12)
Mon, Jan 9	8 p.m.	@ Iowa State*	#8	Hilton Coliseum • Ames, Iowa	ESPN		W 78–58	13–2 (2–0)
Sat, Jan 14	noon	#3 Villanova	#8	Frank Erwin Center • Austin, Texas	CBS	16755	W 58–55	14–2
Tue, Jan 17	8 p.m.	Texas Tech*	#5	Frank Erwin Center • Austin, Texas	ESPN Plus	16312	W 80–46	15–2 (3–0)
Sat, Jan 21	3 p.m.	@ Baylor*	#5	Ferrell Center • Waco, Texas	ESPN Plus		W 66–47	16–2 (4–0)
Mon, Jan 23	7:05 p.m.	Oklahoma State*	#5	Frank Erwin Center • Austin, Texas	ESPN	14053	W 80–46	17–2 (5–0)
Sat, Jan 28	8 p.m.	@ #24 Oklahoma*	#4	Lloyd Noble Center • Norman, Oklahoma (ESPN College GameDay)	ESPN2		L 72–82	17–3 (5–1)
Wed, Feb 1	8:05 p.m.	@ Missouri*	#7	Mizzou Arena • Columbia, Missouri	ESPN2		W 66–53	18–3 (6–1)
Sat, Feb 4	1 p.m.	Texas A&M*	#7	Frank Erwin Center • Austin, Texas	ESPN	16205	W 83–70	19–3 (7–1)
Mon, Feb 6	8 p.m.	@ Texas Tech*	#6	United Spirit Arena • Lubbock, Texas	ESPN2		W 65–44	20–3 (8–1)
Sat, Feb 11	3 p.m.	Nebraska*	#6	Frank Erwin Center • Austin, Texas	ESPN	13311	W 78–59	21–3 (9–1)
Tue, Feb 14	7 p.m.	Baylor*	#6	Frank Erwin Center • Austin, Texas	FSNSW (Texas)	10269	W 90–63	22–3 (10–1)
Sun, Feb 19	12:30 p.m.	@ Oklahoma State*	#6	Gallagher-Iba Arena • Stillwater, Oklahoma	ABC		L 60–81	22–4 (10–2)
Wed, Feb 22	7 p.m.	@ Kansas State*	#7	Bramlage Coliseum • Manhattan, Kansas	ESPN2		W 65–64	23–4 (11–2)
Sat, Feb 25	8 p.m.	#16 Kansas*	#7	Frank Erwin Center • Austin, Texas (ESPN College GameDay)	ESPN	16755	W 80–55	24–4 (12–2)
Wed, Mar 1	7 p.m.	@ Texas A&M*	#6	Reed Arena • College Station, Texas	ESPN2		L 43–46	24–5 (12–3)
Sun, Mar 5	3 p.m.	#19 Oklahoma*	#6	Frank Erwin Center • Austin, Texas	CBS	15386	W 72–48	25–5 (13–3)
2006 Big 12 Conference tournament — No. 1 Seed
Fri, Mar 10	11:30 a.m.	vs. (8) Texas Tech*	#8	American Airlines Center • Dallas, Texas (Big 12 Conference tournament quarterfinals)	ESPNU/ ESPN Plus		W 77–70	26–5
Sat, Mar 11	1 p.m.	vs. (4) Texas A&M*	#8	American Airlines Center • Dallas, Texas (Big 12 Conference tournament semifinals)	ESPN2/ ESPN Plus		W 74–70	27–5
Sun, Mar 12	2 p.m.	vs. (2) #17 Kansas*	#8	American Airlines Center • Dallas, Texas (Big 12 Conference tournament finals)	ESPN		L 68–80	27–6
2006 NCAA tournament — No. 2 Seed
Fri, Mar 17	8:50 p.m.	vs. (15) Pennsylvania	#9	American Airlines Center • Dallas, Texas (NCAA tournament first round)	CBS		W 60–52	28–6
Sun, Mar 19	3:45 p.m.	vs. (10) North Carolina State	#9	American Airlines Center • Dallas, Texas (NCAA tournament second round)	CBS		W 75–54	29–6
Thu, Mar 23	8:40 p.m.	vs. (6) #22 West Virginia	#9	Georgia Dome • Atlanta, Georgia (NCAA Tournament Atlanta Regional semifinal)	CBS		W 74–71	30–6
Sat, Mar 25	3:40 p.m.	vs. (4) #19 Louisiana State	#9	Georgia Dome • Atlanta, Georgia (NCAA Tournament Atlanta Regional Final)	CBS		L 60–70 ^{OT}	30–7
*Big 12 Conference Game. ^{†}All times in Central Standard Time. ^{#}Rank according to Associated Press (AP) Poll. ^{OT} indicates overtime.
