= Mario Chalmers =

American basketball player (born 1986)

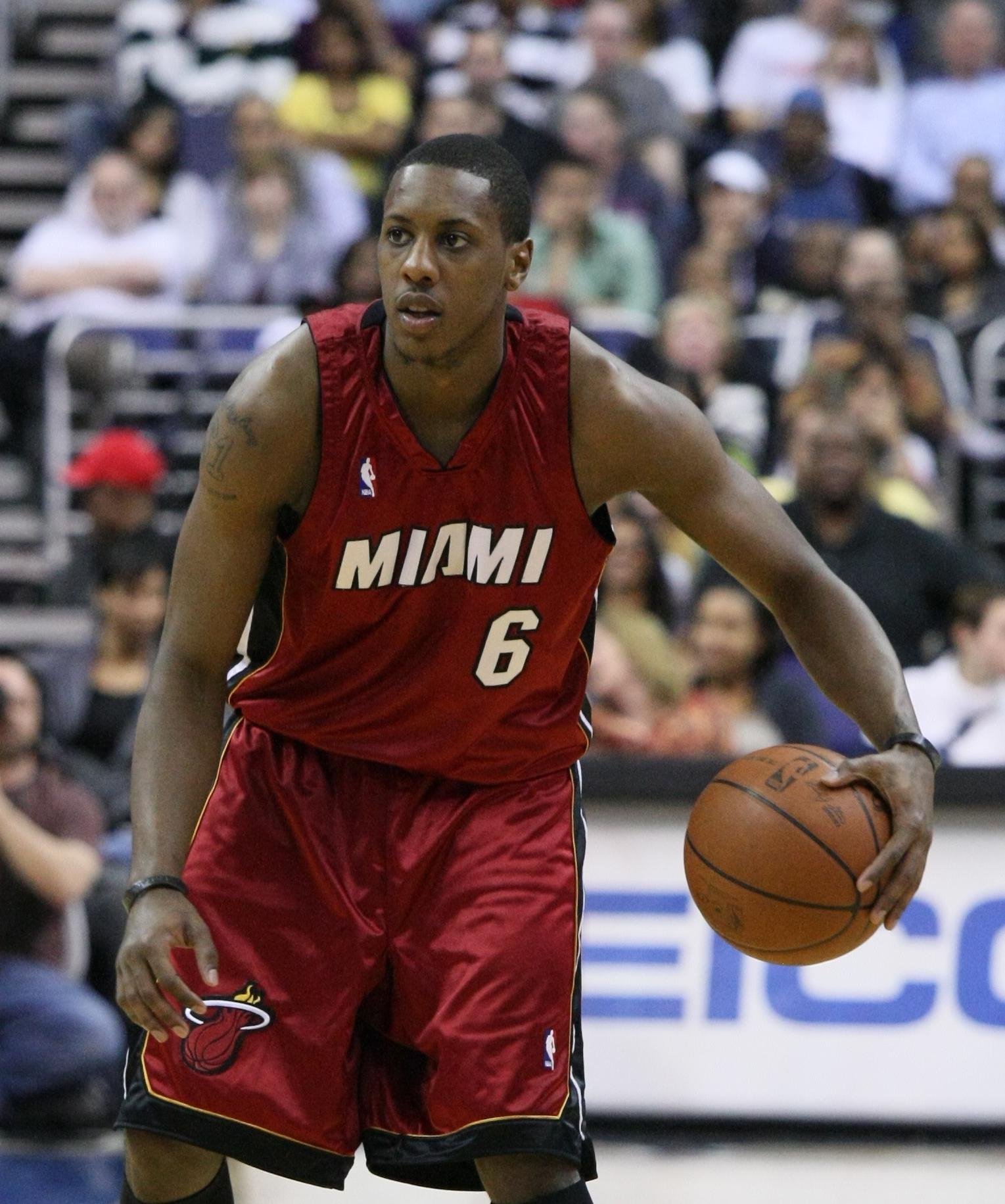
- Chalmers with the Miami Heat in 2009

Personal information
- Born: May 19, 1986 (age 40) Anchorage, Alaska, U.S.
- Listed height: 6 ft 2 in (1.88 m)
- Listed weight: 190 lb (86 kg)

Career information
- High school: Bartlett (Anchorage, Alaska)
- College: Kansas (2005–2008)
- NBA draft: 2008: 2nd round, 34th overall pick
- Drafted by: Minnesota Timberwolves
- Playing career: 2008–2023
- Position: Point guard
- Number: 6, 15

Career history
- 2008–2015: Miami Heat
- 2015–2016, 2017–2018: Memphis Grizzlies
- 2019: Virtus Bologna
- 2019–2020: AEK Athens
- 2020–2021: Aris Thessaloniki
- 2021: Indios de Mayagüez
- 2021: Grand Rapids Gold
- 2022: Sioux Falls Skyforce
- 2023: Zamboanga Valientes

Career highlights
- 2× NBA champion (2012, 2013); NBA All-Rookie Second Team (2009); FIBA Champions League champion (2019); Greek Cup winner (2020); NCAA champion (2008); NCAA Tournament Most Outstanding Player (2008); Big 12 Co-Defensive Player of the Year (2007); Big 12 tournament MVP (2006); No. 15 jersey retired by Kansas Jayhawks; McDonald's All-American (2005); Third-team Parade All-American (2005)
- Stats at NBA.com
- Stats at Basketball Reference

Almario "Mario" Vernard Chalmers (born May 19, 1986) is an American former professional basketball player. He was selected as the 34th overall pick in the 2008 NBA draft by the Minnesota Timberwolves after playing three seasons of college basketball for the University of Kansas. Chalmers was named the 2006–07 Co-Defensive Player of the Year and the Most Outstanding Player of the 2008 NCAA Division I men's basketball tournament after winning the 2008 NCAA championship.

In the NBA, he was the starting point guard for two championship-winning teams with the Miami Heat in 2012 and 2013. Chalmers is the only Alaskan to win a championship in the high school, college, and pro levels. After seven seasons with the Heat he was traded to the Memphis Grizzlies in November 2015 and waived in March 2016 due to injury. After missing a season due to injury he returned with the team in the 2017 offseason before going overseas and G-League in 2018.

== Family life ==
Mario is the son of Ronnie and Almarie Chalmers, parents who have each played active roles in developing basketball players. Ronnie Chalmers is a former head basketball coach at Bartlett High School and assistant coach at the University of Kansas. Almarie Mosley Chalmers has coached many basketball camps and has written a book about raising a basketball family titled The Ball is in Your Court: Embracing Your Child's Dreams. Chalmers has an older sister named Roneka, who lives in Charlotte, North Carolina, where the Chalmers family lived for some time. Chalmers is the father of four kids. He has three sons named Zachiah A'mario Chalmers, Prynce Almario Chalmers, and one that has an unknown public name. In addition, Chalmers has a daughter named Queen Elizabeth Chalmers. He is the cousin of former Los Angeles Clippers guard Lionel Chalmers, and former Minnesota Timberwolves guard Chris Smith.

Chalmers attended Bartlett High School in Anchorage, Alaska, where he was named the 4A State Player of the Year three times in a row, joining Trajan Langdon as the only other player to receive such acclaim. Chalmers led his high school team to two state championships in 2002 and 2003, and a runner-up finish in 2004. As a senior in 2004–05, he was named a McDonald's All-American as well as a third-team Parade All-American.

Considered a five-star recruit by Rivals.com, Chalmers was listed as the No. 2 point guard and the No. 12 player in the nation in 2005.

== College career ==
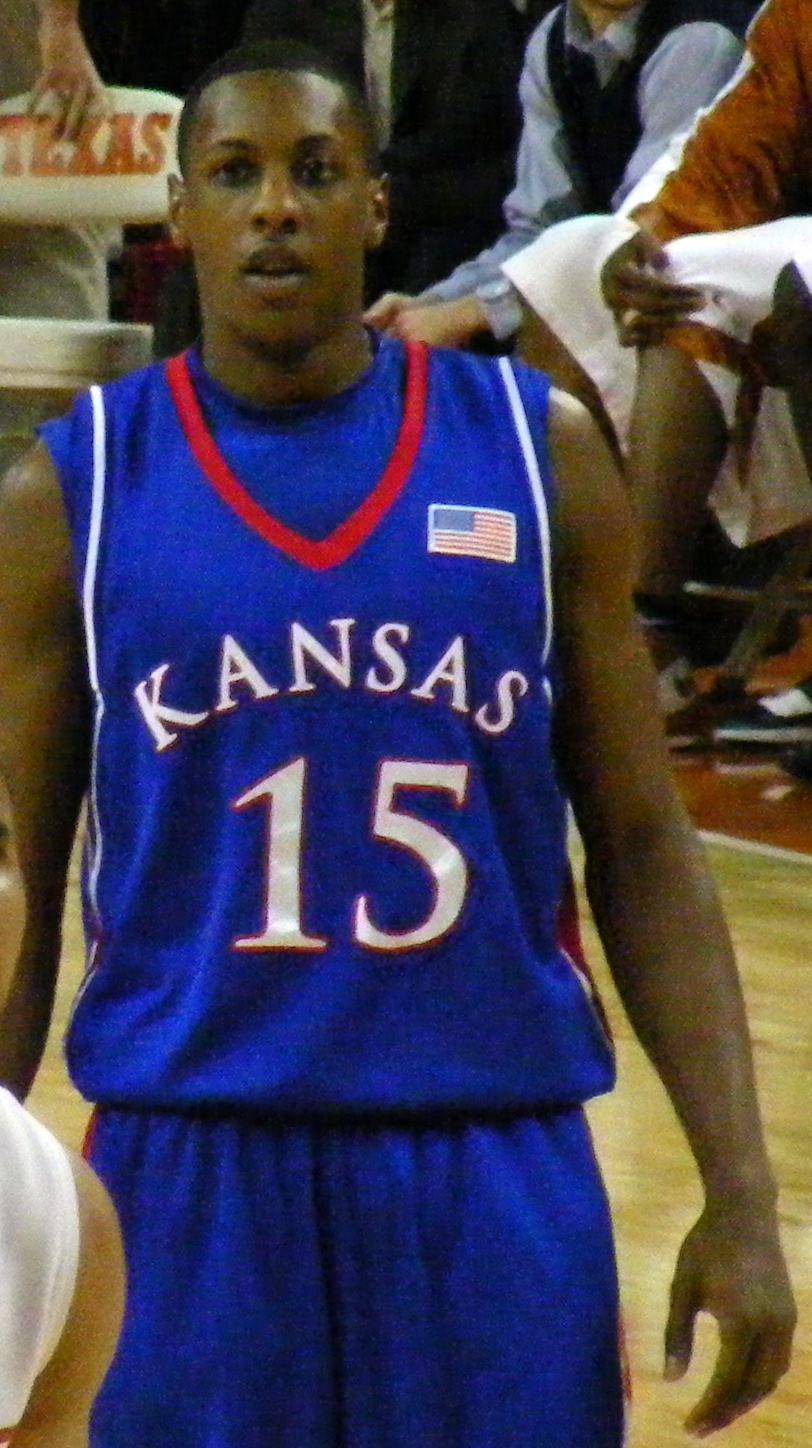
Chalmers playing for the Kansas Jayhawks in February 2008.

Chalmers considered Arizona, North Carolina, Wake Forest and Georgia Tech before finally committing to the University of Kansas on May 21, 2004.

Chalmers began his college career on the bench behind guard Jeff Hawkins, but worked his way into the starting rotation in January 2006. He finished the season starting 21 of the final 22 games (missing only senior night). He finished his freshman year averaging 11.5 points per game, which was second highest on the team. He became the second freshman in Big 12 history to win Conference Player of the Week honors and was named National Freshman of the Week twice. He also set the KU and Big 12 Conference record for most steals in a season by a freshman with 89. Chalmers was named to the Big 12 All-Rookie Team, Big 12 All-Defensive Team, All-Big 12 Honorable Mention (Coaches), Third-Team All-Big-12 (AP), Big 12 All-Tournament Team and the Big 12 Tournament MVP after helping Kansas win the Big 12 tournament. In 33 games, he also averaged 2.2 rebounds, 3.8 assists and 2.7 steals per game.

Chalmers was second on the team in scoring with 12.3 points per game as a sophomore, recording four 20-point games during the 2006–07 season. In the Big 12 Coaches Awards, Chalmers was named Co-Defensive Player of the Year with Marcus Dove of Oklahoma State. He also earned third-team All-Big 12 and All-Big 12 Defensive Team honors. His season total of 97 steals put him in first place in Kansas basketball history for steals in a single season.

Chalmers averaged 12.8 points per game during his junior year. He also led the team with 4.3 assists per game, 46.8% three-point shooting accuracy, and 97 steals. His 97 steals tied the school's single season record, a record that he set as a sophomore. He scored 30 points in Kansas' win in the Big 12 Conference tournament title game against Texas.

Chalmers was again named to the Big 12 All-Defensive Team, and earned second-team All-Big 12 honors.

Chalmers helped his team win the 2008 NCAA Championship with a three-point shot with 2.1 seconds left in the final game. His three just before the end of regulation brought the game into overtime, where Kansas took over and defeated the Memphis Tigers, led by phenom freshman Derrick Rose. Chalmers was named Most Outstanding Player of the tournament. It was the Jayhawks' fifth national title (including two pre-tournament titles in 1922 and 1923).

In April 2008, Chalmers declared for the NBA draft, forgoing his final year of college eligibility.

On February 16, 2013, the University of Kansas basketball program retired his jersey, #15.

Year	Games Played	Minutes/Game	Points/Game	Rebounds/Game	Assists/Game	Turnovers/Game	Assist/Turnover	Steals/Game	Steals/Season
2005–06	33	26.0	11.5	2.2	3.8	2.8	1.37	2.7	89
2006–07	38	29.2	12.2	3.0	3.3	2.4	1.36	2.6	97
2007–08	39	30.0	12.8	3.1	4.3	1.9	2.25	2.5	97

== Professional career ==
=== Miami Heat (2008–2015) ===
After working out for 13 teams, Chalmers was drafted with the 34th overall pick in the second round of the 2008 NBA draft by the Minnesota Timberwolves. When asked immediately after being drafted how many times he had watched his overtime-forcing three-pointer against Memphis in the NCAA championship, Chalmers responded, "a million times." The rights to Chalmers were later included in a trade with the Miami Heat. The Heat signed him on July 8.

On September 3, 2008, Chalmers and fellow former Kansas Jayhawks teammate Darrell Arthur were excused from the NBA's rookie transition program. Fellow NBA rookie Michael Beasley was not asked to leave the camp, but was later fined $50,000 for his involvement in the incident.

==== 2008–09 season ====
Chalmers started all 82 regular season games his rookie year and finished the season averaging 10 points, 4.9 assists, 2.8 rebounds, 2 steals, and 32 minutes per game. His two steals per game ranked number one among all rookies and the fourth highest among all players. On November 5, 2008, in just his fourth NBA game, Chalmers set a franchise record for steals in a game with nine.

==== 2009–10 season ====
After having not missed a game up until the January 30 game against the Milwaukee Bucks, Chalmers missed his first game in his two-year career. The next day, he was ruled out indefinitely with a torn ligament in his left thumb. Chalmers returned to action on February 19 against the Memphis Grizzlies and played out the remainder of the season and the playoffs.

==== 2010–11 season ====
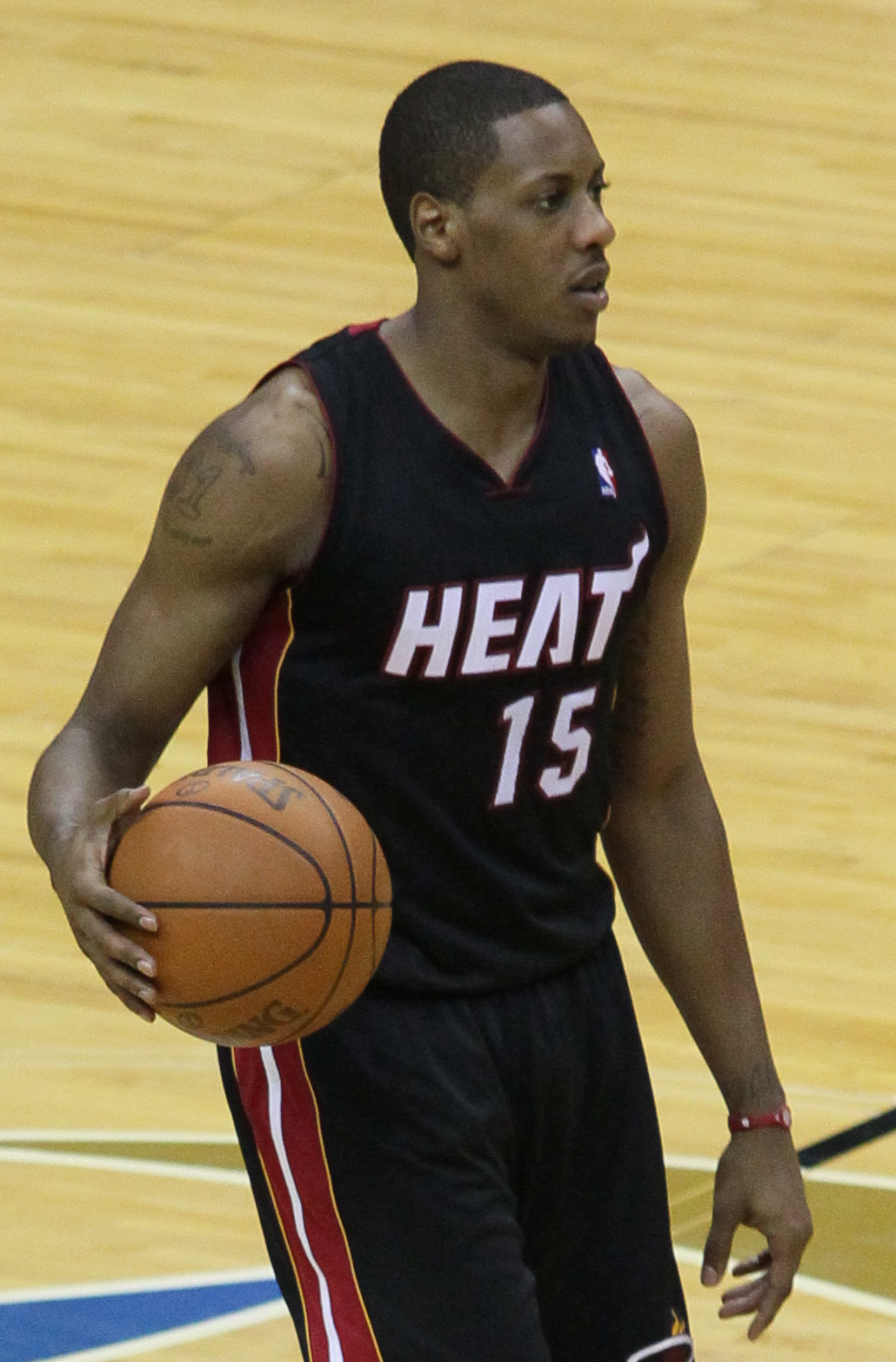
Chalmers in December 2010

Upon the Heat's acquisition of LeBron James in July 2010, Chalmers handed over No. 6 to James after wearing it during his first two NBA seasons, and changed to his collegiate number of 15.

In Game 5 of the 2011 NBA Finals, Chalmers made a half-court shot at the buzzer of the first quarter to give the Heat a 31–30 lead. However, the Heat went on to lose the game to the Dallas Mavericks 112–103 and trailed in the series 2–3. Chalmers had 15 points, 4 rebounds, 2 assists, and 1 steal. In Game 6, the Heat fell to the Mavericks, as they lost the series 4–2.

==== 2011–12 season ====
On June 15, 2011, the Heat extended a qualifying offer to Chalmers, making him a restricted free agent in the offseason. On December 9, 2011, Chalmers re-signed with the Heat on a three-year, $12 million contract.

On February 15, 2012, Chalmers was named a participant in the 2012 NBA All-Star Weekend Three-Point Shootout. He was eliminated in the first round.

Chalmers was highly praised for his 25-point performance in Game 4 of the 2012 NBA Finals. He scored 12 points in the fourth quarter to help the Heat win the game. In Game 5 of the NBA Finals, Chalmers recorded 10 points, seven assists, and two rebounds in 34 minutes of action as he helped the Heat win the 2012 NBA championship. It was Chalmers' first NBA title.

==== 2012–13 season ====
On January 12, 2013, Chalmers scored a career-high 34 points against the Sacramento Kings, making 10 three-pointers. He tied the Heat's record for most three-pointers in a game. On June 9, 2013, during Game 2 of the NBA Finals against the San Antonio Spurs, Chalmers led all scorers with 19 points as the Heat tied the series 1–1 with a 103–84 victory. In the sixth game of the series, on June 18, he scored 20 points to help the Heat secure a 103–100 win. He won his second championship on June 20, as the Heat defeated the Spurs to conclude an intense seven-game series.

==== 2013–14 season ====
On April 4, 2014, Chalmers scored a season-high 24 points in the 121–122 loss to the Minnesota Timberwolves. He finished the regular season with averages of 9.8 points and 4.9 assists in 73 games. The Heat advanced to the 2014 NBA Finals to record their fourth straight Finals appearance. The Heat faced the San Antonio Spurs again, but unlike past Finals series, Chalmers struggled and was replaced in the starting lineup by Ray Allen in Game 5. The Heat ended up losing the series in five games.

==== 2014–15 season ====
On July 14, 2014, Chalmers re-signed with the Heat. On November 22, 2014, he scored a season-high 24 points in the 99–92 win over the Orlando Magic.

=== Memphis Grizzlies (2015–2018) ===
On November 10, 2015, Chalmers was traded, along with James Ennis, to the Memphis Grizzlies in exchange for Jarnell Stokes and Beno Udrih. He made his debut for the Grizzlies three days later, scoring 11 points off the bench in a 101–100 win over the Portland Trail Blazers. On November 16, 2015, he scored a season-high 29 points in a 122–114 win over the Oklahoma City Thunder. On March 10, 2016, he was ruled out for the rest of the season after rupturing his right Achilles tendon in Memphis' 116–96 loss to the Boston Celtics the previous night. He was subsequently waived by the Grizzlies.

In November 2016, after recovering from the Achilles injury, Chalmers was ready to make his comeback. However, he went unsigned throughout the 2016–17 season.

On July 19, 2017, Chalmers re-signed with the Grizzlies.

=== Virtus Bologna (2019) ===
On March 3, 2019, Chalmers joined Virtus Bologna of the Italian Lega Basket Serie A (LBA), signing for the rest of the season with an option to extend it for the 2019–20 season. In the 10 games he played for Virtus (including the LBA and the Champions League), he averaged 7.8 points, 2.3 rebounds, and 3 assists per game. Chalmers won the 2019 FIBA Champions League title with Virtus.

=== AEK Athens (2019–2020) ===
To stay in shape, Chalmers returned to the US during the summer to join the Big3 League.

On November 4, 2019, Chalmers joined AEK Athens of the Greek Basket League, signing a two-month contract with an option to extend it for the rest of the season, which AEK exercised on January 16.

=== Aris (2020–2021) ===
On September 21, 2020, Chalmers signed a one-year contract with Aris Thessaloniki of the Greek Basket League.

=== Indios de Mayagüez (2021) ===
On September 27, 2021, Chalmers signed with Indios de Mayagüez of the Baloncesto Superior Nacional.

=== Grand Rapids Gold (2021) ===
On December 18, 2021, Chalmers signed with the Grand Rapids Gold of the NBA G League.

=== Sioux Falls Skyforce (2022) ===
On December 31, 2021, Chalmers returned to the Miami Heat on a 10-day contract via the hardship exemption after the team placed 5 players in the NBA health and safety protocols. However, he never played a game for the team.

On January 14, 2022, Chalmers was acquired by the Sioux Falls Skyforce.

=== Zamboanga Valientes (2023) ===
In January 2023, Chalmers signed with Zamboanga Valientes in the ASEAN Basketball League.

== NBA career statistics ==
Legend
GP	Games played	GS	Games started	MPG	Minutes per game
FG%	Field goal percentage	3P%	3-point field goal percentage	FT%	Free throw percentage
RPG	Rebounds per game	APG	Assists per game	SPG	Steals per game
BPG	Blocks per game	PPG	Points per game	**Bold**	Career high
†	Won an NBA championship	*	Led the league

=== Regular season ===
Year	Team	GP	GS	MPG	FG%	3P%	FT%	RPG	APG	SPG	BPG	PPG
2008–09	Miami	**82***	**82***	**32.0**	.420	.367	.767	2.8	**4.9**	**2.0**	.1	10.0
2009–10	Miami	73	22	24.8	.401	.318	.745	1.8	3.4	1.2	**.2**	7.1
2010–11	Miami	70	28	22.6	.399	.359	.871	2.1	2.5	1.1	.1	6.4
2011–12†	Miami	64	64	28.5	.448	.388	.792	2.7	3.5	1.5	**.2**	9.8
2012–13†	Miami	77	77	26.9	.429	**.409**	.795	2.2	3.5	1.5	**.2**	8.6
2013–14	Miami	73	73	29.8	**.454**	.385	.742	**2.9**	**4.9**	1.6	**.2**	9.8
2014–15	Miami	80	37	29.6	.403	.294	.774	2.6	3.8	1.5	.1	10.2
2015–16	Miami	6	0	20.0	.313	.091	**.923**	2.3	3.2	1.3	**.2**	5.5
2015–16	Memphis	55	7	22.8	.417	.326	.827	2.6	3.8	1.5	**.2**	**10.8**
2017–18	Memphis	66	10	21.5	.379	.277	.855	2.4	3.0	1.2	**.2**	7.7
Career		646	400	26.7	.417	.351	.793	2.5	3.7	1.5	.2	8.9

=== Playoffs ===
Year	Team	GP	GS	MPG	FG%	3P%	FT%	RPG	APG	SPG	BPG	PPG
2009	Miami	7	7	33.0	.400	.286	.714	2.7	**4.4**	**2.9**	.1	7.3
2010	Miami	5	0	26.2	**.450**	.350	**.846**	1.8	2.6	.6	.0	10.8
2011	Miami	21	1	24.3	.435	**.381**	.719	1.9	2.1	1.3	.0	7.8
2012†	Miami	**23**	**23**	**35.6**	.442	.359	.717	**3.7**	3.9	1.2	**.3**	**11.3**
2013†	Miami	**23**	**23**	28.3	.415	.353	.755	2.3	3.1	.9	.0	9.4
2014	Miami	20	19	26.8	.423	.349	.760	2.3	3.6	1.0	**.3**	6.4
Career		99	73	29.1	.429	.357	.742	2.5	3.2	1.2	.2	8.8

== Charity ==
Chalmers is the founder of the Mario V. Chalmers Foundation, which supports athletic and educational programs for children and also helps fund programs for breast cancer research. During the summer of 2012, Micah Lancaster and Chalmers directed the Miracle Shot Mario Chalmers basketball camp in Salina, Kansas.

In 2013, Chalmers established a travel team program for youth boys called Team Rio National. The U17 team is one of the top ranked teams in the nation and competes in the AAU.

Chalmers offers his own annual basketball camp, the Mario Chalmers Miracle Shot Basketball Camp, to help kids learn and develop basketball skills. In the past, he has hosted his camps in Lawrence, Kansas, his college town, and Anchorage, Alaska, his hometown. His camp is for beginners that want to learn the fundamentals and basic skills of basketball and has a section for the more advanced players.

== See also ==
- List of National Basketball Association single-game steals leaders
