= 2005 Maui Invitational =

The 2005 Maui Invitational Tournament, an annual early-season college basketball tournament held in Lahaina, Hawaii, was held November 21–23 at Lahaina Civic Center. The winning team was UConn.

== Bracket ==
* – Denotes overtime period

Fifth Place Game; November 23
Maryland	75
Arkansas	62
Seventh Place Game
Kansas	102
Chaminade	54

Consolation 2nd Round; November 22
Chaminade	69
Maryland	98
Kansas	64
Arkansas	65

First Round; November 21
12	Michigan State	89
Chaminade	67
20	Gonzaga	88
Maryland	76
10	Arizona	61
Kansas	49
Arkansas	68
3	Connecticut	77

Semifinals; November 22
12	Michigan State	106
20	Gonzaga	109***
9	Arizona	70
3	Connecticut	79

Championship; November 23
5	Gonzaga	63
3	Connecticut	65
Third Place Game
12	Michigan State	74*
9	Arizona	71
