= 2006 Big 12 men's basketball tournament =

- Classification: Division I
- Season: 2005–06
- Teams: 12
- Site: American Airlines Center; Dallas, Texas
- Champions: Kansas (4th title)
- Winning coach: Bill Self (1st title)
- MVP: Mario Chalmers (Kansas)
- Attendance: 109,428 (overall); 17,458 (championship)
- Top scorer: P. J. Tucker (Texas) (52 points)
- Television: ESPN, ESPN2, ESPNU

2005–06 Big 12 men's basketball standings
	Conf.				Overall
Team	W		L	PCT	W		L	PCT
No. 9 Texas	13	–	3	.813	30	–	7	.811
No. 12 Kansas †	13	–	3	.813	25	–	8	.758
No. 24 Oklahoma	11	–	5	.688	20	–	9	.690
Texas A&M	10	–	6	.625	22	–	9	.710
Colorado	9	–	7	.563	20	–	10	.667
Nebraska	7	–	9	.438	19	–	14	.576
Oklahoma State	6	–	10	.375	17	–	16	.515
Texas Tech	6	–	10	.375	15	–	17	.469
Kansas State	6	–	10	.375	15	–	13	.536
Iowa State	6	–	10	.375	16	–	14	.533
Missouri	5	–	11	.313	12	–	16	.429
Baylor	4	–	12	.250	4	–	13	.235
† 2006 Big 12 Tournament winner Rankings from AP poll

The 2006 Big 12 men's basketball tournament was the postseason men's basketball tournament for the Big 12 Conference. It was played from March 9 to 12 in Dallas, Texas at the American Airlines Center. Kansas won the tournament for the 4th time and received the conference's automatic bid to the 2006 NCAA tournament.

== Seeding ==
The Tournament consisted of a 12 team single-elimination tournament with the top 4 seeds receiving a bye.

2006 Big 12 Men's Basketball Tournament seeds
Seed	School	Conf.	Over.	Tiebreaker
1	Texas ‡#	13–3	30–7	
2	Kansas c#	13–3	25–8	
3	Oklahoma #	11–5	20–9	
4	Texas A&M #	10–6	22–9	
5	Colorado	9–7	20–10	
6	Nebraska	7–9	19–14	
7	Oklahoma State	6–10	17–16	
8	Texas Tech	6–10	15–17	
9	Kansas State	6–10	15–13	
10	Iowa State	6–10	16–14	
11	Missouri	5–11	12–16	
12	Baylor	4–12	4–13	
‡ – Big 12 Conference regular season champions, and tournament No. 1 seed. c – Big 12 Conference regular season co-champion, not tournament No. 1 seed. # – Received a single-bye in the conference tournament. Overall records include all games played in the Big 12 Conference tournament.

== Schedule ==
Session	Game	Time	Matchup	Television	Attendance
First Round – Thursday, March 9
1	1	11:30 am	#8 Texas Tech 73 vs #9 Kansas State 65	ESPNU	17,799
1	2	2:00 pm	#5 Colorado 65 vs #12 Baylor 61	ESPNU	17,799
2	3	6:00 pm	#7 Oklahoma State 79 vs #10 Iowa State 70	ESPNU	17,816
2	5	11:30 am	#1 Texas 77 vs #8 Texas Tech 70	ESPNU	17,816
Quarterfinals – Friday, March 10
3	5	11:30 am	#1 Texas 77 vs #8 Texas Tech 70	ESPNU	18,464
3	6	2:00 pm	#4 Texas A&M 86 vs #5 Colorado 53	ESPNU	18,464
4	7	6:00 pm	#2 Kansas 63 vs #7 Oklahoma State 62	ESPNU	18,892
4	8	8:20 pm	#6 Nebraska 69 vs #3 Oklahoma 63	ESPNU	18,892
Semifinals – Saturday, March 11
5	9	1:00 pm	#1 Texas 74 vs #4 Texas A&M 70	ESPN2	18,999
5	10	3:20 pm	#2 Kansas 79 vs #6 Nebraska 65	ESPN2	18,999
Final – Sunday, March 12
6	11	2:00 pm	#2 Kansas 80 vs #1 Texas 68	ESPN	17,458
Game times in CT. #-Rankings denote tournament seed

== Bracket ==
First Round; Thursday, March 9
8	Texas Tech	78
9	Kansas State	64
5	Colorado	65
12	Baylor	61
6	Nebraska	71
11	Missouri	64
7	Oklahoma St	79
10	Iowa St	70

Quarterfinals; Friday, March 10
8	Texas Tech	70
1	#8 Texas	77
5	Colorado	53
4	Texas A&M	86
6	Nebraska	69
3	#22 Oklahoma	65
2	#17 Kansas	63
7	Oklahoma St	62

Semifinals; Saturday, March 11
1	#8 Texas	74
4	Texas A&M	70
6	Nebraska	65
2	#17 Kansas	79

Finals; Sunday, March 12
1	#8 Texas	68
2	#17 Kansas	80

== All-Tournament Team ==
Most Outstanding Player – Mario Chalmers, Kansas

Player	Team	Position	Class
Mario Chalmers	Kansas	Fr.	G
Julian Wright	Kansas	Fr.	F
LaMarcus Aldridge	Texas	So.	F
P. J. Tucker	Texas	Jr.	F
Acie Law	Texas A&M	Jr.	G

== See also ==
- 2006 Big 12 Conference women's basketball tournament
- 2006 NCAA Division I men's basketball tournament
- 2005–06 NCAA Division I men's basketball rankings
