= 2005–06 NCAA Division I men's basketball rankings =

- Season: 2005–06
- NCAA Tournament: 2006
- Preseason No. 1: Duke
- NCAA Tournament Champions: Florida
NCAA Division I men's basketball rankings


The 2005–06 NCAA Division I men's basketball rankings was made up of two human polls, the AP Poll and the Coaches Poll, in addition to various other preseason polls.

== Legend ==
	Increase in ranking
	Decrease in ranking
	Not ranked previous week
Italics	Number of first place votes
(#-#)	Win–loss record
т	Tied with team above or below also with this symbol

== AP Poll ==
	Preseason Pre	Week 1 Nov 15	Week 2 Nov 22	Week 3 Nov 29	Week 4 Dec 6	Week 5 Dec 13	Week 6 Dec 20	Week 7 Dec 27	Week 8 Jan 3	Week 9 Jan 10	Week 10 Jan 17	Week 11 Jan 24	Week 12 Jan 31	Week 13 Feb 7	Week 14 Feb 14	Week 15 Feb 21	Week 16 Feb 28	Week 17 Mar 7	Week 18 Mar 14	
1.	Duke (61)	Duke (0–0)	Duke (3–0) (65)	Duke (5–0) (61)	Duke (7–0) (53)	Duke (9–0) (66)	Duke (10–0) (66)	Duke (11–0) (61)	Duke (12–0) (63)	Duke (14–0) (72)	Duke (16–0) (71)	UConn (16–1) (64)	UConn (18–1) (65)	UConn (20–1) (68)	UConn (22–1) (67)	Duke (25–1) (64)	Duke (27–1) (65)	UConn (27–2) (59)	Duke (30–3)	1.
2.	Texas (6)	Texas (0–0)	Texas (2–0) (6)	Texas (5–0) (6)	Texas (7–0) (9)	UConn (7–0) (5)	UConn (8–0) (5)	UConn (9–0) (7)	UConn (11–0) (7)	Florida (14–0)	Florida (16–0) (1)	Duke (17–1) (7)	Duke (19–1) (7)	Duke (21–1) (3)	Duke (23–1) (4)	Villanova (21–2) (3)	UConn (25–2) (6)	Villanova (24–3) (11)	UConn (27–3)	2.
3.	UConn	UConn (0–0)	UConn (1–0)	UConn (4–0) (4)	UConn (6–0) (9)	Villanova (6–0) (1)	Villanova (7–0) (1)	Villanova (8–0) (1)	Villanova (9–0) (2)	Villanova (10–1)	UConn (14–1)	Memphis (17–2)	Memphis (19–2)	Memphis (21–2)	Memphis (22–2)	UConn (23–2) (4)	Memphis (26–2) (1)	Duke (27–3) (1)	Villanova (25–4)	3.
4.	Michigan State (4)	Michigan State (0–0)	Villanova (1–0) (1)	Villanova (2–0) (1)	Villanova (4–0) (1)	Louisville (5–0)	Memphis (8–1)	Memphis (9–1)	Memphis (11–1)	UConn (12–1)	Memphis (15–2)	Texas (16–2)	Villanova (15–2)	Villanova (17–2) (1)	Villanova (19–2) (1)	Memphis (24–2) (1)	Villanova (22–3)	Memphis (27-3)	Memphis (30–3)	4.
5.	Villanova (1)	Villanova (0–0)	Oklahoma (1–0)	Oklahoma (3–0)	Louisville (3–0)	Memphis (7–1)	Florida (10–0)	Florida (11–0)	Florida (12–0)	Memphis (13–2)	Texas (14–2)	Florida (17–1)	Gonzaga (17–3)	Gonzaga (18–3)	Gonzaga (20–3)	Gonzaga (22–3)	Gonzaga (24–3)	Gonzaga (26-3) (1)	Gonzaga (27–3)	5.
6.	Oklahoma	Oklahoma (0–0)	Louisville (1–0)	Gonzaga (3–1)	Boston College (6–0)	Texas (8–1)	Illinois (11–0)	Illinois (12–0)	Illinois (14–0)	Gonzaga (11–3)	Gonzaga (13–3)	Villanova (13–2) (1)	Illinois (19–2)	Texas (19–3)	Texas (21–3)	George Washington (22–1)	Texas (24–4)	George Washington (26–1)	Ohio State (25–5)	6.
7.	Louisville	Louisville (0–0)	Kentucky (2–0)	Louisville (1–0)	Memphis (6–1)	Florida (9–0)	Oklahoma (6–1)	Washington (10–0)	Michigan State (12–2)	Illinois (15–1)	Illinois (16–1)	Gonzaga (15–3)	Texas (17–3)	Florida (20–2)	George Washington (20–1)	Texas (22–4)	George Washington (24–1)	Ohio State (23–4)	Boston College (26–7)	7.
8.	Gonzaga	Kentucky (1–0)	Gonzaga (1–0)	Boston College (5–0)	Oklahoma (4–1)	Oklahoma (5–1)	Gonzaga (7–2)	Gonzaga (9–2)	Gonzaga (10–3)	Texas (12–2)	Villanova (11–2)	Illinois (17–2)	Florida (18–2)	George Washington (18–1)	Tennessee (18–3)	Illinois (22–4)	Pittsburgh (21–4)	Texas (25–5)	UCLA (27–6)	8.
9.	Kentucky	Gonzaga (0–0)	Arizona (0–0)	Memphis (3–1)	Gonzaga (4–2)	Illinois (10–0)	Washington (9–0)	Michigan State (10–2)	Louisville (11–1)	Indiana (10–2)	Pittsburgh (14–0)	West Virginia (14–3)	Pittsburgh (17–1)	West Virginia (17–4)	Pittsburgh (19–3)	Pittsburgh (20–4)	Ohio State (21–4)	Illinois (25–5)	Texas (27–6)	9.
10.	Arizona	Arizona (0–0)	Boston College (2–0)	Kentucky (4–1)	Florida (7–0)	Gonzaga (6–2)	Michigan State (9–2)	Louisville (9–1)	Washington (11–1)	Louisville (12–2)	Washington (14–2)	Washington (16–2)	George Washington (16–1)	Illinois (20–3)	Florida (21–3)	Tennessee (19–4)	Illinois (23–5)	North Carolina (21–6)	North Carolina (22–7)	10.
11.	Boston College	Boston College (0–0)	Memphis (2–0)	Florida (5–0)	Illinois (7–0)	Washington (8–0)	Louisville (6–1)	UCLA (10–1)	Boston College (10–2)	UCLA (13–2)	Michigan State (14–4)	Michigan State (15–4)	West Virginia (15–4)	Tennessee (16–3)	West Virginia (18–5)	Boston College (21–5)	Tennessee (20–5)	Boston College (24–6)	Florida (27–6)	11.
12.	Memphis	Memphis (0–0)	Michigan State (0–1)	Illinois (5–0)	Iowa (7–1)	Michigan State (7–2)	UCLA (8–1)	George Washington (8–0)	Oklahoma (8–2)	Pittsburgh (12–0)	West Virginia (12–3)	Pittsburgh (15–1)	Michigan State (16–5)	Michigan State (17–5)	Ohio State (18–3)	Florida (22–4)	Boston College (22–6)	Washington (24–5)	Kansas (25–7)	12.
13.	Stanford	Stanford (0–0)	West Virginia (2–0)	Michigan State (3–2)	Washington (7–0)	Boston College (6–2)	George Washington (8–0)	Boston College (8–2)	NC State (11–1)	Washington (12–2)	Indiana (10–3)	Indiana (12–3)	Tennessee (14–3)	UCLA (19–4)	Boston College (19–5)	Ohio State (19–4)	North Carolina (19–6)	UCLA (24–6)	Illinois (25–6)	13.
14.	West Virginia	West Virginia (0–0)	Florida (4–0)	Iowa (4–1)	Michigan State (5–2)	UCLA (7–1)	Boston College (7–2)	Oklahoma (6–2)	Maryland (10–2)	Michigan State (12–4)	NC State (14–2)	George Washington (14–1)	UCLA (17–4)	Pittsburgh (17–3)	Illinois (20–4)	West Virginia (18–7)	Washington (22–5)	Tennessee (21–6)	George Washington (26–2)	14.
15.	Alabama	Alabama (0–0)	Illinois (2–0)	Arizona (2–2)	Kentucky (5–2)	George Washington (7–0)	Texas (8–2)	Texas (9–2)	Texas (10–2)	Boston College (11–3)	Wisconsin (14–2)	NC State (15–3)	Boston College (16–4)	Georgetown (16–4)	UCLA (20–5)	NC State (21–5)	UCLA (22–6)	Pittsburgh (21–6)	Iowa (25–8)	15.
16.	Syracuse	Syracuse (0–0)	UCLA (3–0)	UCLA (4–1)	UCLA (6–1)	Wake Forest (7–1)	Maryland (7–2)	Maryland (8–2)	Indiana (8–2)	West Virginia (10–3)	George Washington (12–1)	Ohio State (14–2)	Washington (16–4)	NC State (18–4)	Michigan State (18–6)	Kansas (19–6)	West Virginia (19–8)	Florida (24–6)	Pittsburgh (24–7)	16.
17.	Illinois	Illinois (0–0)	Syracuse (3–1)	Indiana (3–0)	Nevada (5–0)	Maryland (7–2)	North Carolina (6–1)	Indiana (7–2)	UCLA (11–2)	George Washington (10–1)	Louisville (13–3)	UCLA (15–4)	Georgetown (14–4)	Boston College (17–5)	Georgetown (17–7)	Washington (20–5)	Florida (22–6)	LSU (22–7) т	Washington (24–6)	17.
18.	Wake Forest т	UCLA (0–0)	Iowa (2–0)	Washington (6–0)	Indiana (4–1)	Indiana (5–2)	Indiana (5–2)	Kentucky (8–3)	Ohio State (10–0)	NC State (12–2)	UCLA (14–3)	Maryland (13–4)	NC State (16–4)	Iowa (18–5)	Iowa (19–6)	Michigan State (19–7)	Kansas (20–7)	Kansas (22–7) т	Tennessee (21–7)	18.
19.	UCLA т	Wake Forest (2–0)	Alabama (2–1)	George Washington (2–0)	George Washington (4–0)	North Carolina (5–1)	Kentucky (7–3)	NC State (9–1)	Kentucky (9–3)	Ohio State (11–1)	Ohio State (12–2)	Tennessee (12–3)	Oklahoma (13–4)	Ohio State (16–3)	Oklahoma (16–5)	UCLA (20–6)	Oklahoma (19–6)	West Virginia (20–9)	LSU (23–8)	19.
20.	Iowa	Iowa (0–0)	Indiana (1–0)	Nevada (3–0)	Wake Forest (7–1)	Nevada (6–1)	Nevada (7–1)	Nevada (8–1)	George Washington (8–1)	North Carolina (9–2)	Syracuse (15–2)	Boston College (14–4)	Ohio State (14–3)	Oklahoma (14–5)	Washington (18–5)	Iowa (20–7)	Georgetown (19–7)	Iowa (22–8)	Nevada (27–5)	20.
21.	George Washington	George Washington (0–0)	George Washington (0–0)	Alabama (2–1)	Maryland (5–1)	NC State (6–1)	NC State (8–1)	Ohio State (8–0)	Arizona (9–3)	Wisconsin (12–2)	Boston College (12–4)	Georgetown (12–4)	Michigan (15–3)	Washington (16–5)	NC State (19–5)	North Carolina (17–6)	LSU (20–7)	Nevada (24–5)	Syracuse (23–11)	21.
22.	Nevada	Nevada (0–0)	Nevada (1–0)	Wake Forest (5–1)	Alabama (4–1)	Iowa (7–3)	Wake Forest (8–2)	Wake Forest (9–2)	Pittsburgh (11–0)	Oklahoma (9–3)	Maryland (12–4)	Louisville (13–5)	Indiana (12–5)	Michigan (16–4)	Kansas (17–6)	Oklahoma (17–6)	NC State (21–7)	Oklahoma (20–7)	West Virginia (20–10)	22.
23.	Indiana	Indiana (0–0)	Maryland (1–0)	Maryland (4–1)	North Carolina (4–1)	Kentucky (6–3)	Tennessee (6–0)	North Carolina (6–2)	Wake Forest (10–2)	Maryland (11–3)	Iowa (13–4)	Wisconsin (14–4)	Iowa (16–5)	North Carolina (14–5)	North Carolina (15–6)	Georgetown (17–7)	Iowa (20–8)	Georgetown (19–8)	Georgetown (21–9)	23.
24.	Maryland	Maryland (0–0)	Wake Forest (3–1)	NC State (5–0)	Arizona (2–3)	Arizona (4–3)	Ohio State (7–0)	Wisconsin (9–1)	West Virginia (8–3)	Arizona (10–4)	North Carolina (10–3)	Oklahoma (11–4)	LSU (14–5)	Indiana (13–6)	Bucknell (20–3)	LSU (18–7)	Nevada (22–5)	UAB (22–5)	Oklahoma (20–8)	24.
25.	Iowa State	Iowa State (0–0)	Washington (4–0)	LSU (3–0)	NC State (5–1)	Houston (4–1)	Iowa (8–3)	West Virginia (7–3)	North Carolina (7–2)	Cincinnati (13–2)	Oklahoma (10–4)	Syracuse (15–4)	Northern Iowa (19–3)	Northern Iowa (20–4)	LSU (16–7)	Nevada (20–5); Northern Iowa (22–6)	Michigan State (19–9)	NC State (21–8)	UAB (24–6)	25.
	Preseason Pre	Week 1 Nov 15	Week 2 Nov 22	Week 3 Nov 29	Week 4 Dec 6	Week 5 Dec 13	Week 6 Dec 20	Week 7 Dec 27	Week 8 Jan 3	Week 9 Jan 10	Week 10 Jan 17	Week 11 Jan 24	Week 12 Jan 31	Week 13 Feb 7	Week 14 Feb 14	Week 15 Feb 21	Week 16 Feb 28	Week 17 Mar 7	Week 18 Mar 14	
		None	Dropped: Stanford (2–1); Iowa State (1–0)	Dropped: West Virginia (2–3); Syracuse (4–2)	Dropped: LSU (3–1)	Dropped: Alabama (4–3)	Dropped: Arizona (6–3); Houston (4–3)	Dropped: Tennessee (6–1); Iowa (10–3)	Dropped: Nevada (10-2); Wisconsin (10–2)	Dropped: Kentucky (10–4); Wake Forest (9–5)	Dropped: Arizona (10–6); Cincinnati (13–4)	Dropped: Iowa (14–5); North Carolina (11–4)	Dropped: Maryland (14–5); Louisville (14–6); Wisconsin (14–6)	Dropped: LSU (15–6)	Dropped: Michigan (16–6); Indiana (13–8); Northern Iowa (21–5)	Dropped: Bucknell (21–4)	None	Dropped: Michigan State (20–10)	Dropped: NC State (21-9)	

== Coaches Poll ==
	Preseason	Week 2 Nov 22	Week 3 Nov 29	Week 4 Dec 6	Week 5 Dec 13	Week 6 Dec 20	Week 7 Dec 27	Week 8 Jan 3	Week 9 Jan 10	Week 10 Jan 17	Week 11 Jan 24	Week 12 Jan 31	Week 13 Feb 7	Week 14 Feb 14	Week 15 Feb 21	Week 16 Feb 28	Week 17 Mar 7	Week 18 Mar 14	Week 19 Apr 4	
1.	Duke (28)	Duke (3–0) (29)	Duke (5–0) (27)	Duke (7–0) (25)	Duke (9–0) (30)	Duke (10–0) (29)	Duke (11–0) (30)	Duke (12–0) (30)	Duke (14–0) (31)	Duke (16–0) (31)	UConn (16–1) (19)	UConn (18–1) (20)	UConn (20–1) (22)	UConn (22–1) (22)	Duke (25–1) (26)	Duke (27–1) (27)	UConn (27–2) (27)	Duke (30–3)	Florida (33–6)	1.
2.	UConn	Texas (2–0) (2)	Texas (5–0) (3)	Texas (7–0) (4)	UConn (7–0) (1)	UConn (8–0) (1)	UConn (9–0) (1)	UConn (11–0) (1)	Florida (14–0)	Florida (16–0)	Duke (17–1) (10)	Duke (19–1) (10)	Duke (21–1) (8)	Duke (23–1) (8)	Villanova (21–2)	UConn (25–2) (1)	Villanova (24–3) (4)	UConn (27–3)	UCLA (32–7)	2.
3.	Texas (2)	UConn (1–0)	UConn (4–0) (1)	UConn (6–0) (1)	Villanova (6–0)	Villanova (7–0) (1)	Villanova (8–0)	Villanova (9–0)	Villanova (10–1)	UConn (14–1)	Memphis (17–2) (1)	Memphis (19–2) (1)	Memphis (21–2) (1)	Memphis (22–2) (1)	Memphis (24–2) (3)	Memphis (26–2) (3)	Duke (27–3)	Memphis (30–3)	LSU (27–9)	3.
4.	Villanova (1)	Villanova (1–0)	Villanova (2–0)	Villanova (4–0) (1)	Louisville (5–0)	Memphis (8–1)	Memphis (9–1)	Memphis (11–1)	UConn (12–1)	Memphis (15–2)	Florida (17–1)	Villanova (15–2)	Villanova (17–2)	Villanova (19–2)	Connecticut (23–2) (2)	Villanova (22–3)	Gonzaga (26–3)	Villanova (25–4)	Connecticut (30–4)	4.
5.	Michigan State	Oklahoma (1–0)	Oklahoma (3–0)	Louisville (3–0)	Memphis (7–1)	Florida (10–0)	Florida (11–0)	Florida (12–0)	Memphis (13–2)	Illinois (16–1)	Texas (16–2) (1)	Gonzaga (17–3)	Gonzaga (18–3)	Gonzaga (20–3)	Gonzaga (22–3)	Gonzaga (24–3)	Memphis (27–3)	Gonzaga (27–3)	Villanova (28–5)	5.
6.	Oklahoma	Louisville (1–0)	Louisville (1–0)	Boston College (6–0)	Florida (9–0)	Illinois (11–0)	Illinois (12–0)	Illinois (14–0)	Illinois (15–1)	Texas (14–2)	Villanova (13–2)	Illinois (19–2)	Florida (20–2)	Texas (21–3)	George Washington (22–1)	George Washington (24–1)	George Washington (26–1)	Ohio State (25–5)	Memphis (33–4)	6.
7.	Gonzaga	Kentucky (2–0)	Gonzaga (3–1)	Memphis (6–1)	Texas (8–1)	Washington (9–0)	Washington (10–0)	Michigan State (12–2)	Gonzaga (11–3)	Villanova (11–2)	Illinois (17–2) т	Florida (18–2)	Texas (19–3)	Florida (21–3)	Texas (22–4)	Texas (24–4)	Ohio State (23–4)	Boston College (26–7)	Duke (32–4)	7.
8.	Louisville	Arizona (0–0)	Boston College (5–0)	Florida (7–0)	Illinois (10–0)	Oklahoma (6–1)	Gonzaga (9–2)	Louisville (11–1)	Indiana (10–2)	Gonzaga (13–3)	Gonzaga (15–3) т	Texas (17–3)	George Washington (18–1)	George Washington (20–1)	Illinois (22–4)	Ohio State (21–4)	Texas (25–5)	UCLA (27–6)	George Mason (27–8)	8.
9.	Arizona	Gonzaga (1–0)	Memphis (3–1)	Oklahoma (4–1)	Oklahoma (5–1)	Gonzaga (7–2)	Michigan State (10–2)	Gonzaga (10–3)	Texas (12–2)	Pittsburgh (14–0)	Washington (16–2)	Pittsburgh (17–1)	Illinois (20–3)	Pittsburgh (19–3)	Florida (22–4)	Pittsburgh (21–4)	Illinois (25–5)	Texas (27–6)	Texas (30–7)	9.
10.	Kentucky	Boston College (2–0)	Kentucky (4–1)	Illinois (7–0)	Washington (8–0)	Louisville (6–1)	Louisville (9–1)	Washington (11–1)	Louisville (12–2)	Washington (14–2)	Pittsburgh (15–1)	George Washington (16–1)	West Virginia (17–4)	Tennessee (18–3)	Pittsburgh (20–4)	Illinois (23–5)	North Carolina (21–6)	Florida (27–6)	Gonzaga (29–4)	10.
11.	Boston College	Memphis (2–0)	Florida (5–0)	Gonzaga (4–2)	Gonzaga (6–2)	Michigan State (9–2)	UCLA (10–1)	Boston College (10–2)	Pittsburgh (12–0)	Indiana (10–3)	Indiana (12–3)	West Virginia (15–4)	Michigan State (17–5)	West Virginia (18–5)	Tennessee (19–4)	Tennessee (20–5)	Boston College (24–6)	George Washington (26–2)	Boston College (28–8)	11.
12.	Memphis	Michigan State (0–1)	Illinois (5–0)	Washington (7–0)	Michigan State (7–2)	UCLA (8–1)	George Washington (8–0)	Maryland (10–2) т	UCLA (13–2)	Michigan State (14–4)	Michigan State (15–4)	Michigan State (16–5)	UCLA (19–4)	Ohio State (18–3)	Ohio State (19–4)	Boston College (22–6)	UCLA (24–6)	North Carolina (22–7)	Washington (26–7)	12.
13.	Stanford	West Virginia (2–0)	Arizona (2–2)	Iowa (7–1)	Boston College (6–2)	George Washington (8–0)	Boston College (8–2)	NC State (11–1) т	Washington (12–2)	Wisconsin (14–2)	West Virginia (14–3)	UCLA (17–4)	Pittsburgh (17–3)	Illinois (20–4)	Boston College (21–5)	UCLA (22–6)	Washington (24–5)	Kansas (25–7)	Ohio State (26–6)	13.
14.	Alabama	Illinois (2–0)	Michigan State (3–2)	Michigan State (5–2)	UCLA (7–1)	Boston College (7–2)	Maryland (8–2)	Oklahoma (8–2)	Boston College (11–3)	NC State (14–2)	NC State (15–3)	Boston College (16–4)	Tennessee (16–3)	UCLA (20–5)	NC State (21–5)	Florida (22–6)	Florida (24–6)	Illinois (25–6)	North Carolina (23–8)	14.
15.	West Virginia	Florida (4–0)	Iowa (4–1)	Kentucky (5–2)	George Washington (6–0)	Texas (8–2)	Oklahoma (6–2)	Indiana (8–2)	Michigan State (12–4)	Louisville (13–3)	George Washington (14–1)	Washington (16–4)	NC State (18–4)	Boston College (19–5)	West Virginia (18–7)	North Carolina (19–6)	Tennessee (21–6)	Iowa (25–8)	West Virginia (22–11)	15.
16.	Syracuse	UCLA (3–0)	Indiana (3–0)	Indiana (4–1)	Wake Forest (7–1)	Maryland (7–2)	Texas (9–2)	Texas (10–2)	Ohio State (11–1)	UCLA (14–3)	Ohio State (14–2)	Tennessee (14–3)	Georgetown (16–4)	Michigan State (18–6)	Michigan State (19–7)	Washington (22–5)	Pittsburgh (21–6)	Pittsburgh (24–7)	Georgetown (23–10)	16.
17.	Illinois	Iowa (2–0)	UCLA (4–1)	Maryland (5–1)	Maryland (7–2)	Indiana (5–2)	Indiana (7–2)	UCLA (11–2)	Wisconsin (12–2)	West Virginia (12–3)	UCLA (15–4)	NC State (16–4)	Ohio State (16–3)	Georgetown (17–7)	UCLA (20–6)	Oklahoma (19–6)	LSU (22–7)	Washington (24–6)	Illinois (26–7)	17.
18.	Wake Forest т	Alabama (2–1)	Alabama (2–1)	UCLA (6–1)	Indiana (5–2)	NC State (8–1)	NC State (9–1)	Ohio State (10–0)	NC State (12–2)	George Washington (12–1)	Boston College (14–4)	Oklahoma (13–4)	Boston College (17–5)	NC State (19–5)	Kansas (19–6)	West Virginia (19–8)	Kansas (22–7)	LSU (23–8)	Pittsburgh (25–8)	18.
19.	UCLA т	Syracuse (3–1)	Washington (6–0)	Alabama (4–1)	NC State (6–1)	North Carolina (6–1)	Kentucky (8–3)	George Washington (8–1)	George Washington (10–1)	Ohio State (12–2)	Maryland (13–4)	Ohio State (14–3)	Iowa (18–5)	Oklahoma (16–5)	Washington (20–5)	NC State (21–7)	Oklahoma (20–7)	Tennessee (21–7)	George Washington (27–3)	19.
20.	Iowa	Maryland (1–0)	Maryland (4–1)	George Washington (4–0)	North Carolina (5–1)	Kentucky (7–3)	Ohio State (8–0)	Pittsburgh (11–0)	North Carolina (9–2)	Syracuse (15–2)	Tennessee (12–3)	Michigan (15–3)	Oklahoma (14–5)	Iowa (19–6)	Oklahoma (17–6)	Georgetown (19–7)	Iowa (22–8)	Oklahoma (20–8)	Tennessee (22–8)	20.
21.	Maryland	Indiana (1–0)	NC State (5–0)	Wake Forest (7–1)	Nevada (6–1)	Nevada (7–1)	Nevada (8–1)	Kentucky (9–3)	Maryland (11–3)	Boston College (12–4)	Wisconsin (14–4)	Indiana (12–5)	Indiana (13–6)	Washington (18–5)	North Carolina (17–6)	LSU (20–7)	West Virginia (20–9)	Nevada (27–5)	Wichita State (26–9)	21.
22.	Indiana	George Washington (0–0)	George Washington (2–0)	Nevada (5–0)	Kentucky (6–3)	Ohio State (7–0)	Wisconsin (9–1)	Wake Forest (10–2)	Oklahoma (9–3)	Maryland (12–4)	Oklahoma (11–4)	Georgetown (14–4)	Michigan (16–4)	Kansas (17–6)	Iowa (20–7)	Kansas (20–7)	NC State (21–8)	Syracuse (23–11)	Kansas (25–8)	22.
23.	Iowa State	Iowa State (1–0)	Wake Forest (5–1)	NC State (5–1)	Iowa (7–3)	Wisconsin (9–1)	Pittsburgh (9–0)	Arizona (9–3)	West Virginia (10–3)	North Carolina (10–3)	Louisville (13–5)	Maryland (14–5)	Washington (16–5)	North Carolina (15–6)	Georgetown (17–7)	Michigan State (19–9)	Georgetown (19–8)	West Virginia (20–10)	Iowa (25–9)	23.
24.	George Washington	Wake Forest (3–1)	Syracuse (4–2)	North Carolina (4–1)	Wisconsin (7–1)	Wake Forest (8–2)	Wake Forest (9–2)	Wisconsin (10–2)	Syracuse (13–2)	Oklahoma (10–4)	Syracuse (15–4)	Northern Iowa (19–3)	North Carolina (14–5)	Bucknell (20–3)	LSU (18–7)	Iowa (20–8)	Nevada (24–5)	Georgetown (21–9)	Bradley (22–11)	24.
25.	Nevada	Stanford (0–1)	LSU (3–0)	Arizona (2–3)	Ohio State (4–0)	Pittsburgh (8–0)	North Carolina (6–2)	North Carolina (7–2)	Arizona (10–4)	Iowa (13–4)	North Carolina (11–4)	Colorado (15–3)	Colorado (15–4)	LSU (16–7)	George Mason (21–5)	Wisconsin (19–8)	UAB (22–5)	UAB (24–6)	Bucknell (27–5)	25.
	Preseason	Week 2 Nov 22	Week 3 Nov 29	Week 4 Dec 6	Week 5 Dec 13	Week 6 Dec 20	Week 7 Dec 27	Week 8 Jan 3	Week 9 Jan 10	Week 10 Jan 17	Week 11 Jan 24	Week 12 Jan 31	Week 13 Feb 7	Week 14 Feb 14	Week 15 Feb 21	Week 16 Feb 28	Week 17 Mar 7	Week 18 Mar 14	Week 19 Apr 4	
		Dropped: Nevada (1–0)	Dropped: West Virginia (0–0); Iowa State (0–0); Stanford (0–0)	Dropped: Syracuse (0–0); LSU (3–1)	Dropped: Alabama (0–0); Arizona (4–3)	Dropped: Iowa (8–3)	None	Dropped: Nevada	Dropped: Kentucky; Wake Forest	Dropped: Arizona (10–6)	Dropped: Iowa (14–5)	Dropped: Wisconsin (14–6); Louisville (14–6); Syracuse (15–6); North Carolina (12–5)	Dropped: Maryland (15–6); Northern Iowa (20–4)	Dropped: Indiana (13–8); Michigan (16–6); Colorado (16–5)	Dropped: Bucknell (21–4)	Dropped: George Mason (22–6)	Dropped: Wisconsin	Dropped: NC State	Dropped: Nevada (27–6); Syracuse (23–12); Oklahoma (20–9); UAB (24–7)	
