= 2005–06 Big East Conference men's basketball season =

American college basketball season

2005–06 Big East Conference Men's Basketball Season
- League: NCAA Division I
- Sport: Basketball
- Duration: November 12, 2005 through March 11, 2006
- Teams: 16
- TV partner: ESPN

Regular Season
- Champion: Connecticut and Villanova (14–2)
- Season MVP: Randy Foye – Villanova

Tournament
- Champions: Syracuse
- Finals MVP: Gerry McNamara – Syracuse

Basketball seasons
- 2004–05 2006–07

2005–06 Big East men's basketball standings
	Conf.				Overall
Team	W		L	PCT	W		L	PCT
No. 2 Connecticut	14	–	2	.875	30	–	4	.882
No. 3 Villanova	14	–	2	.875	28	–	5	.848
No. 22 West Virginia	11	–	5	.688	22	–	11	.667
Marquette	10	–	6	.625	20	–	11	.645
No. 23 Georgetown	10	–	6	.625	23	–	10	.697
No. 16 Pittsburgh	10	–	6	.625	25	–	8	.758
Seton Hall	9	–	7	.563	18	–	12	.600
Cincinnati	8	–	8	.500	21	–	13	.618
Rutgers	7	–	9	.438	19	–	14	.576
Louisville	6	–	10	.375	21	–	13	.618
Notre Dame	6	–	10	.375	16	–	14	.533
DePaul*	5	–	11	.313	12	–	15	.444
Providence*	5	–	11	.313	12	–	15	.444
St. John's*	5	–	11	.313	12	–	15	.444
South Florida*	1	–	15	.063	7	–	22	.241
No. 21 Syracuse†#	0	–	9	.000	0	–	12	.000
† 2006 Big East tournament winner As of April 3, 2006; Rankings from AP Poll; *Did not qualify for 2006 Big East tournament. #Syracuse had all its wins vacated due to sanctions against the program; Syracuse′s disputed record was 23–12, 7–9.

The 2005–06 Big East Conference men's basketball season was the 27th in conference history, and involved its 16 full-time member schools.

Connecticut and Villanova were the regular-season co-champions with identical records of 14–2. Syracuse won the Big East tournament championship, although this later was vacated.

== Season summary & highlights ==
- Although Boston College left to join the Atlantic Coast Conference before the season, the Big East expanded for the first time since the 2000–01 season, growing to 16 teams with the addition of Cincinnati, DePaul, Louisville, Marquette, and South Florida.
- Connecticut and Villanova were the regular-season co-champions with identical records of 14–2. It was Boston College's sixth and Connecticut's ninth conference championship or co-championship.
- Syracuse won its fifth — and second consecutive — Big East tournament championship. The Orange became the first No. 9 seed to win the tournament, as well as the first team to win four games in four days in a Big East tournament. The heroics of senior guard Gerry McNamara, voted the Big East's "Most Overrated" player in two separate polls of Big East players and assistant coaches published by Sports Illustrated and the Syracuse Post-Standard prior to the tournament, fueled Syracuse's run, and he was named the tournament's Most Valuable Player. Syracuse defeated Cincinnati by one point, Connecticut by two points in overtime, Georgetown by one point, and finally Pittsburgh by four points, all in upsets.
- Due to NCAA sanctions imposed in March 2015 because of the Syracuse University athletics scandal, all of Syracuse's wins from this season, including those in the Big East Tournament, later were vacated. Despite this, Syracuse retained its 2006 Big East Tournament championship.

== Head coaches ==
School	Coach	Season	Notes
Cincinnati	Andy Kennedy	1st	Interim coach; resigned March 23, 2006
Connecticut	Jim Calhoun	20th	
DePaul	Jerry Wainwright	1st	
Georgetown	John Thompson III	2nd	
Louisville	Rick Pitino	5th	
Marquette	Tom Crean	7th	
Notre Dame	Mike Brey	6th	
Pittsburgh	Jamie Dixon	3rd	
Providence	Tim Welsh	8th	
Rutgers	Gary Waters	5th	Resigned March 1, 2006
St. John's	Norm Roberts	2nd	
Seton Hall	Louis Orr	5th	Fired March 24, 2006
South Florida	Robert McCullum	3rd	
Syracuse	Jim Boeheim	30th	
Villanova	Jay Wright	5th	Big East Coach of the Year
West Virginia	John Beilein	4th	

== Rankings ==
Connecticut was ranked in the Associated Press poll Top 5 all season, reaching No. 1 in several weeks and finishing at No. 2. Villanova spent the entire season in the Top 10 and all but one week in the Top 5, reaching No. 2 and finishing at No. 3. Georgetown, Louisville, Pittsburgh, Syracuse, and West Virginia spent time in the Top 25, and all but Louisville finished the season as ranked teams. Cincinnati also made an appearance in the Top 25.

2005–06 Big East Conference Weekly Rankings Key: ██ Increase in ranking. ██ Decrease in ranking.
AP Poll	Pre	11/14	11/21	11/28	12/5	12/12	12/19	12/26	1/2	1/9	1/16	1/23	1/30	2/6	2/13	2/20	2/27	3/6	Final
Cincinnati										25									
Connecticut	3	3	3	3	3	2	2	2	2	4	3	1	1	1	1	3	2	1	2
DePaul																			
Georgetown												21	17	15	17	23	20	23	23
Louisville	7	7	6	7	5	4	11	10	9	10	17	22							
Marquette																			
Notre Dame																			
Pittsburgh									22	12	9	12	9	14	9	9	8	15	16
Providence																			
Rutgers																			
St. John's																			
Seton Hall																			
South Florida																			
Syracuse	16	16	17								20	25							21
Villanova	5	5	4	4	4	3	3	3	3	3	8	6	4	4	4	2	4	2	3
West Virginia	14	14	13					25	24	16	12	9	11	9	11	14	16	19	22

== Regular-season statistical leaders ==
Scoring
Name	School	PPG
Quincy Douby	RU	25.4
Randy Foye	Vill	20.5
Kevin Pittsnogle	WVU	19.3
Allan Ray	Vill	18.5
Chris Quinn	ND	17.7

Rebounding
Name	School	RPG
Aaron Gray	Pitt	10.5
Solomon Jones	USF	9.8
Eric Hicks	Cin	9.7
Torin Francis	ND	9.4
Geoff McDermott	Prov	9.0

Assists
Name	School	APG
Chris Quinn	ND	6.4
Gerry McNamara	Syr	5.9
Dominic James	Mar	5.4
Eugene Lawrence	SJU	4.9
Carl Krauser	Pitt	4.8

Steals
Name	School	SPG
Kyle Lowry	Vill	2.3
Jerel McNeal	Mar	2.1
Devan Downey	Cin	1.9
Gerry McNamara	Syr	1.9
Mike Gansey	WVU	1.9

Blocks
Name	School	BPG
Eric Hicks	Cin	3.3
Hilton Armstrong	Conn	3.1
Solomon Jones	USF	3.1
Darryl Watkins	Syr	2.8
McHugh Mattis	USF	2.1

Field Goals
Name	School	FG%
Randall Hanke	Prov	.677
Mike Gansey	WVU	.550
Aaron Gray	Pitt	.526
James White	Cin	.488
Sammy Mejía	DeP	.484

3-Pt Field Goals
Name	School	3FG%
Steve Novak	Mar	.467
Rashad Anderson	Conn	.407
Quincy Douby	RU	.401
Kevin Pittsnogle	WVU	.401
Colin Falls	ND	.397

Free Throws
Name	School	FT%
Gerry McNamara	Syr	.902
Allan Ray	Vill	.889
Chris Quinn	ND	.872
Taquan Dean	Lou	.860
Kevin Pittsnogle	WVU	.857

== Postseason ==
=== Big East tournament ===
==== Seeding ====
Teams were seeded in the Big East tournament based on conference record and tiebreakers. The No. 5 through No. 12 seeds played in the first round, and the No. 1 through No. 4 seeds received byes into the quarterfinal round. Teams which finished below 12th place in the conference after the application as necessary of tiebreakers did not qualify for the tournament

Seeding was (1) Connecticut, (2) Villanova, (3) West Virginia, (4) Marquette, (5) Georgetown, (6) Pittsburgh, (7) Seton Hall, (8) Cincinnati, (9) Syracuse, (10) Rutgers, (11) Louisville, and (12) Notre Dame. By finishing below 12th place, DePaul, Providence, St. John's, and South Florida did not qualify for the tournament.

The NCAA later vacated all of Syracuse's wins during the season, including its four Big East Tournament victories, because of the use of an ineligible player.

==== Bracket ====
First round Wednesday, March 8
8	Cincinnati	73
9	~~Syracuse~~	74
5	#23 Georgetown	67
12	Notre Dame	63
7	Seton Hall	48
10	Rutgers	61
6	#15 Pittsburgh	61
11	Louisville	56

Quarterfinals; Thursday, March 9
1	#1 Connecticut	84
9	~~Syracuse~~	86^{OT}
4	Marquette	59
5	#23 Georgetown	62
2	#2 Villanova	87
10	Rutgers	55
3	#19 West Virginia	57
6	#15 Pittsburgh	68

Semifinals; Friday, March 10
9	~~Syracuse~~	58
5	#23 Georgetown	57
2	#2 Villanova	54
6	#15 Pittsburgh	68

Final; Saturday, March 11
9	~~Syracuse~~	65
6	#15 Pittsburgh	61

=== NCAA tournament ===
Eight Big East teams received bids to the NCAA Tournament, with Connecticut seeded No. 1 in the Washington, D.C., Region and Villanova No. 1 in the Minneapolis Region. Marquette, Seton Hall, and Syracuse lost in the first round and Pittsburgh in the second round. Georgetown and West Virginia were defeated in the regional semifinals and Connecticut and Villanova in the regional finals.

School	Region	Seed	Round 1	Round 2	Sweet 16	Elite 8
Connecticut	Washington, D.C.	1	16 Albany, W 72–59	8 Kentucky, W 87–83	5 Washington, W 98–92^{(OT)}	11 George Mason, L 86–84^{(OT)}
Villanova	Minneapolis	1	16 Monmouth, W 58–45	8 Arizona, W 82–78	4 Boston College, W 60–59^{(OT)}	3 Florida, L 75–62
West Virginia	Atlanta	6	11 Southern Illinois, W 64–46	14 Northwestern State, W 67–54	2 Texas, L 74–71	
Georgetown	Minneapolis	7	10 Northern Iowa, W 54–49	2 Ohio State, W 70–52	3 Florida, L 57–53	
Pittsburgh	Oakland	5	12 Kent State, W 79–64	13 Bradley, L 72–66		
Syracuse	Atlanta	5	12 Texas A&M, L 66–58			
Marquette	Oakland	7	10 Alabama, L 90–85			
Seton Hall	Washington, D.C.	10	7 Wichita State, L 86–66			

=== National Invitation Tournament ===
Four Big East teams received bids to the National Invitation Tournament, with Cincinnati seeded No. 1 in the Cincinnati Bracket and Louisville No. 1 in the Louisville Bracket. Rutgers lost in the first round, Notre Dame in the second round, Cincinnati in the quarterfinals, and Louisville in the semifinals.

School	Bracket	Seed	Opening round	Round 1	Round 2	Quarterfinals	Semifinals
Louisville	Louisville	1	Bye	10 Delaware State, W 71–54	4 Clemson, W 74–68	2 Missouri State, W 74–56	C3 South Carolina, L 78–63
Cincinnati	Cincinnati	1	Bye	9 Charlotte, W 86–80	4 Minnesota, W 76–62	3 South Carolina, L 65–62	
Notre Dame	Michigan	5	Bye	4 Vanderbilt, W 79–69	1 Michigan, L 87–84		
Rutgers	Maryland	8	7 Penn State, W 76–71	2 Saint Joseph's, L 71–62			

== Awards and honors ==
=== Big East Conference ===
Player of the Year:

- Randy Foye, Villanova, G Sr.

Defensive Player of the Year:

- Hilton Armstrong, Connecticut, C Sr.

Rookie of the Year:

- Dominic James, Marquette, G, Fr.

Most Improved Player:

- Aaron Gray, Pittsburgh, C Jr.

Coach of the Year:

- Jay Wright, Villanova (5th season)

All-Big East First Team

- Eric Hicks, Boston College, F Sr., 6 ft 7 in (201 cm), 245 lb (111 kg), Greensboro, N.C.
- Rudy Gay, Connecticut, F, So., 6 ft 9 in (206 cm), 220 lb (100 kg), Baltimore, Md.
- Steve Novak, Marquette, F Sr., 6 ft 10 in (208 cm), 220 lb (100 kg), Brown Deer, Wisc.
- Chris Quinn, Notre Dame, G Sr., 6 ft 2 in (188 cm), 185 lb (84 kg), Dublin, Ohio
- Aaron Gray, Pittsburgh, C Jr., 7 ft 0 in (213 cm), 270 lb (122 kg), Emmaus, Pa.
- Quincy Douby, Rutgers, G Jr., 6 ft 3 in (191 cm), 175 lb (79 kg), New York, N.Y.
- Gerry McNamara, Syracuse, G Sr., 6 ft 2 in (188 cm), 182 lb (83 kg), Scranton, Pa.
- Randy Foye, Villanova, G Sr., 6 ft 4 in (193 cm), 210 lb (95 kg), Newark, N.J.
- Allan Ray, Villanova, G Sr., 6 ft 2 in (188 cm), 190 lb (86 kg), The Bronx, N.Y.
- Mike Gansey, West Virginia, F Sr., 6 ft 4 in (193 cm), 205 lb (93 kg), Olmsted Falls, Ohio

All-Big East Second Team:

- Hilton Armstrong, Connecticut, C Sr., 6 ft 11 in (211 cm), 235 lb (107 kg), Peekskill, N.Y.
- Marcus Williams, Connecticut, G Jr., 6 ft 3 in (191 cm), 205 lb (93 kg), Los Angeles, Calif.
- Jeff Green, Georgetown, F, So., 6 ft 9 in (206 cm), 235 lb (107 kg), Hyattsville, Md.
- Roy Hibbert, Georgetown, C, So., 7 ft 2 in (218 cm), 278 lb (126 kg), Adelphi, Md.
- Taquan Dean, Louisville, G Sr., 6 ft 3 in (191 cm), 185 lb (84 kg), Neptune, N.J.
- Carl Krauser, Pittsburgh, G Sr., 6 ft 2 in (188 cm), 200 lb (91 kg), The Bronx, N.Y.
- Donnie McGrath, Providence, G Sr., 6 ft 4 in (193 cm), 190 lb (86 kg), Katonah, N.Y.
- Donald Copeland, Seton Hall, G Sr., 5 ft 10 in (178 cm), 170 lb (77 kg), Jersey City, N.J.
- Kelly Whitney, Seton Hall, F Sr., 6 ft 8 in (203 cm), 240 lb (109 kg), Chicago, Ill.
- Kyle Lowry, Villanova, G, So., 6 ft 0 in (183 cm), 175 lb (79 kg), Philadelphia, Pa.

Big East All-Rookie Team:

- Devan Downey, Cincinnati, G, Fr., 5 ft 10 in (178 cm), 175 lb (79 kg), Chester, S.C.
- Jeff Adrien, Connecticut, F, Fr., 6 ft 7 in (201 cm), 243 lb (110 kg), Brookline, Mass.
- Wilson Chandler, DePaul, F, Fr., 6 ft 8 in (203 cm), 220 lb (100 kg), Benton Harbor, Mich.
- Dominic James, Marquette, G, Fr., 5 ft 11 in (180 cm), 185 lb (84 kg), Richmond, Ind.
- Jerel McNeal, Marquette, G, Fr., 6 ft 3 in (191 cm), 200 lb (91 kg), Chicago, Ill.
- Sam Young, Pittsburgh, F, Fr., 6 ft 6 in (198 cm), 220 lb (100 kg), Clinton, Md.
- Geoff McDermott, Providence, F, Fr., 6 ft 8 in (203 cm), 235 lb (107 kg), New Rochelle, N.Y.
- Sharaud Curry, Providence, G, Fr., 5 ft 10 in (178 cm), 170 lb (77 kg), Gainesville, Ga.
- Anthony Farmer, Rutgers, G, Fr., 6 ft 1 in (185 cm), 190 lb (86 kg), Millville, N.J.
- JR Inman, Rutgers, F, Fr., 6 ft 9 in (206 cm), 230 lb (104 kg), Pomona, N.Y.
- Eric Devendorf, Syracuse, G, Fr., 6 ft 4 in (193 cm), 180 lb (82 kg), Bay City, Mich.

=== All-Americans ===
The following players were selected to the 2006 Associated Press All-America teams.

Consensus All-America First Team:

- Randy Foye, Villanova, Key Stats: 20.5 ppg, 5.8 rpg, 3.0 apg, 1.4 spg, 41.1 FG%, 35.0 3P%, 677 points

Consensus All-America Second Team:

- Rudy Gay, Connecticut, Key Stats: 15.2 ppg, 6.4 rpg, 2.1 apg, 1.8 spg, 1.6 bpg, 46.1 FG%, 31.8 3P%, 503 points
- Allan Ray, Villanova, Key Stats: 18.5 ppg, 3.6 rpg, 1.8 apg, 1.2 spg, 38.9 FG%, 37.2 3P%, 591 points

First Team All-America:

- Randy Foye, Villanova, Key Stats: 20.5 ppg, 5.8 rpg, 3.0 apg, 1.4 spg, 41.1 FG%, 35.0 3P%, 677 points

Second Team All-America:

- Rudy Gay, Connecticut, Key Stats: 15.2 ppg, 6.4 rpg, 2.1 apg, 1.8 spg, 1.6 bpg, 46.1 FG%, 31.8 3P%, 503 points

Third Team All-America:

- Allan Ray, Villanova, Key Stats: 18.5 ppg, 3.6 rpg, 1.8 apg, 1.2 spg, 38.9 FG%, 37.2 3P%, 591 points

AP Honorable Mention

- Quincy Douby, Rutgers
- Mike Gansey, West Virginia
- Carl Krauser, Pittsburgh
- Gerry McNamara, Syracuse
- Kevin Pittsnogle, West Virginia
- Chris Quinn, Notre Dame
- Marcus Williams, Connecticut

== See also ==
- 2005–06 NCAA Division I men's basketball season
- 2005–06 Cincinnati Bearcats men's basketball team
- 2005–06 Connecticut Huskies men's basketball team
- 2005–06 Georgetown Hoyas men's basketball team
- 2005–06 Louisville Cardinals men's basketball team
- 2005–06 Marquette Golden Eagles men's basketball team
- 2005–06 Pittsburgh Panthers men's basketball team
- 2005–06 St. John's Red Storm men's basketball team
- 2005–06 Seton Hall Pirates men's basketball team
- 2005–06 Syracuse Orange men's basketball team
- 2005–06 Villanova Wildcats men's basketball team
- 2005–06 West Virginia Mountaineers men's basketball team
