= 2005–06 Notre Dame Fighting Irish men's basketball team =

American college basketball season

2005–06 Notre Dame Fighting Irish men's basketball

NIT, Second Round
- Conference: Big East Conference
- Record: 16–14 (6–10 Big East)
- Head coach: Mike Brey (6th season)
- Home arena: Joyce Center

2005–06 Big East men's basketball standings
	Conf.				Overall
Team	W		L	PCT	W		L	PCT
No. 2 Connecticut	14	–	2	.875	30	–	4	.882
No. 3 Villanova	14	–	2	.875	28	–	5	.848
No. 22 West Virginia	11	–	5	.688	22	–	11	.667
Marquette	10	–	6	.625	20	–	11	.645
No. 23 Georgetown	10	–	6	.625	23	–	10	.697
No. 16 Pittsburgh	10	–	6	.625	25	–	8	.758
Seton Hall	9	–	7	.563	18	–	12	.600
Cincinnati	8	–	8	.500	21	–	13	.618
Rutgers	7	–	9	.438	19	–	14	.576
Louisville	6	–	10	.375	21	–	13	.618
Notre Dame	6	–	10	.375	16	–	14	.533
DePaul*	5	–	11	.313	12	–	15	.444
Providence*	5	–	11	.313	12	–	15	.444
St. John's*	5	–	11	.313	12	–	15	.444
South Florida*	1	–	15	.063	7	–	22	.241
No. 21 Syracuse†#	0	–	9	.000	0	–	12	.000
† 2006 Big East tournament winner As of April 3, 2006; Rankings from AP Poll; *Did not qualify for 2006 Big East tournament. #Syracuse had all its wins vacated due to sanctions against the program; Syracuse′s disputed record was 23–12, 7–9.

The 2005–06 Notre Dame Fighting Irish men's basketball team represented the University of Notre Dame in the 2005–06 NCAA Division I men's basketball season. The team finished with an overall record of 16–14 (6–10 Big East).

== Roster ==
2005–06 Notre Dame Fighting Irish men's basketball team
Players
Coaches

Pos.	#	Name	Height	Weight	Year	Hometown
F	42	Ryan Ayers	6 ft 8 in (2.03 m)	208 lb (94 kg)	Fr	Blue Bell, Pennsylvania
G	43	Russell Carter	6 ft 4 in (1.93 m)	220 lb (100 kg)	Jr	Paulsboro, New Jersey
F	11	Rick Cornett	6 ft 8 in (2.03 m)	256 lb (116 kg)	Sr	Country Club Hills, Illinois
G	15	Colin Falls	6 ft 5 in (1.96 m)	200 lb (91 kg)	Jr	Park Ridge, Illinois
C	34	Torin Francis	6 ft 11 in (2.11 m)	252 lb (114 kg)	Sr	Boston, Massachusetts
F	33	Zach Hillesland	6 ft 9 in (2.06 m)	226 lb (103 kg)	Fr	Toledo, Ohio
F	31	Rob Kurz	6 ft 9 in (2.06 m)	232 lb (105 kg)	So	Lower Gwynedd, Pennsylvania
G	23	Kyle McAlarney	6 ft 1 in (1.85 m)	200 lb (91 kg)	Fr	Staten Island, New York
F	24	Chris Murphy	6 ft 7 in (2.01 m)	216 lb (98 kg)	Sr	Downers Grove, Illinois
G	2	Chris Quinn	6 ft 2 in (1.88 m)	178 lb (81 kg)	Sr	Dublin, Ohio
F	40	Luke Zeller	6 ft 11 in (2.11 m)	245 lb (111 kg)	Fr	Washington, Indiana

Head coach

- Mike Brey

Assistant coach(es)

- Sean Kearne
- Lewis Preston
- Rod Balanis

Legend

- (C) Team captain
- (S) Suspended
- (I) Ineligible
- (W) Walk-on
- Injured
- Current redshirt

Roster

== Schedule ==
Date time, TV	Rank^{#}	Opponent^{#}	Result	Record	Site city, state
November 20*		Lafayette	W 84–66	1–0	Joyce Center; South Bend, IN
November 22*		Hofstra	W 69–50	2–0	Joyce Center; South Bend, IN
November 26*		vs. NC State	L 48–61	2–1	Conseco Fieldhouse; Indianapolis, IN
December 3*		Michigan	L 67–71	2–2	Joyce Center; South Bend, IN
December 7*		at No. 22 Alabama	W 78–71	3–2	Coleman Coliseum; Tuscaloosa, Alabama
December 10*		Florida International	W 81–77	4–2	Joyce Center; South Bend, IN
December 18*		at Purdue Fort Wayne	W 65–63	5–2	Allen County War Memorial Coliseum; Fort Wayne, IN
December 21*		Niagara	W 80–59	6–2	Joyce Center; South Bend, IN
December 23*		Columbia	W 75–68	7–2	Joyce Center; South Bend, IN
December 28*		Fordham	W 85–49	8–2	Joyce Center; South Bend, IN
December 30*		Wofford	W 74–71	9–2	Joyce Center; South Bend, IN
January 4		at No. 22 Pittsburgh	L 97–100 ^{2OT}	9–3 (0–1)	Petersen Events Center; Pittsburgh, Pennsylvania
January 7		at DePaul	L 67–73	9–4 (0–2)	Allstate Arena; Rosemont Horizon
January 11		Syracuse	L 82–88	9–5 (0–3)	Joyce Center; South Bend, IN
January 14		Providence	W 92–77	10–5 (1–3)	Joyce Center; South Bend, IN
January 20		at Marquette	L 65–67	10–6 (1–4)	Bradley Center; Milwaukee, WI
January 24		No. 21 Georgetown	L 82–85 ^{2OT}	10–7 (1–5)	Joyce Center; South Bend, IN
January 28		No. 6 Villanova	L 70–72	10–8 (1–6)	Joyce Center; South Bend, IN
February 1		at No. 11 West Virginia	L 70–71	10–9 (1–7)	WVU Coliseum; Morgantown, WV
February 4		at Louisville	L 86–89 ^{OT}	10–10 (1–8)	Freedom Hall; Louisville, Kentucky
February 8		Rutgers	W 90–63	11–10 (2–8)	Joyce Center; South Bend, IN
February 15		South Florida	W 62–55	12–10 (3–8)	Joyce Center; South Bend, IN
February 18		at Seton Hall	W 102–91	13–10 (4–8)	Continental Airlines Arena; East Rutherford, NJ
February 21		at No. 9 Connecticut	L 74–75 ^{OT}	13–11 (4–9)	Harry A. Gampel Pavilion; Storrs, Connecticut
February 25		Marquette	L 72–80	13–12 (4–10)	Joyce Center; South Bend, IN
March 1		at Providence	W 82–75	14–12 (5–10)	Dunkin' Donuts Center; Providence, RI
March 4		DePaul	W 66–61	15–12 (6–10)	Joyce Center; South Bend, IN
Big East Tournament
March 8		vs. No. 23 Georgetown; First Round	L 63–67	15–13 (6–10)	Madison Square Garden; New York, NY
NIT
March 15*		Vanderbilt; First Round	W 79–69	16–13 (6–10)	Joyce Center; South Bend, IN
March 20*		at Michigan; Second Round	L 84–87 ^{2OT}	16–14 (6–10)	Crisler Arena; Ann Arbor, Michigan
*Non-conference game. ^{#}Rankings from AP Poll. (#) Tournament seedings in parentheses.
