= 2005–06 Marquette Golden Eagles men's basketball team =

American college basketball season

2005–06 Marquette Golden Eagles men's basketball

NCAA tournament, first round
- Conference: Big East Conference
- Record: 20–11 (10–6 Big East)
- Head coach: Tom Crean (7th season)
- Home arena: Bradley Center

2005–06 Big East men's basketball standings
	Conf.				Overall
Team	W		L	PCT	W		L	PCT
No. 2 Connecticut	14	–	2	.875	30	–	4	.882
No. 3 Villanova	14	–	2	.875	28	–	5	.848
No. 22 West Virginia	11	–	5	.688	22	–	11	.667
Marquette	10	–	6	.625	20	–	11	.645
No. 23 Georgetown	10	–	6	.625	23	–	10	.697
No. 16 Pittsburgh	10	–	6	.625	25	–	8	.758
Seton Hall	9	–	7	.563	18	–	12	.600
Cincinnati	8	–	8	.500	21	–	13	.618
Rutgers	7	–	9	.438	19	–	14	.576
Louisville	6	–	10	.375	21	–	13	.618
Notre Dame	6	–	10	.375	16	–	14	.533
DePaul*	5	–	11	.313	12	–	15	.444
Providence*	5	–	11	.313	12	–	15	.444
St. John's*	5	–	11	.313	12	–	15	.444
South Florida*	1	–	15	.063	7	–	22	.241
No. 21 Syracuse†#	0	–	9	.000	0	–	12	.000
† 2006 Big East tournament winner As of April 3, 2006; Rankings from AP Poll; *Did not qualify for 2006 Big East tournament. #Syracuse had all its wins vacated due to sanctions against the program; Syracuse′s disputed record was 23–12, 7–9.

The 2005–06 Marquette Golden Eagles men's basketball team represented Marquette University in the 2005–06 season. Their head coach was Tom Crean. They received an at-large bid to the 2006 NCAA Division I men's basketball tournament, where they lost in the first round to Alabama. This was the first year in which Marquette played in the Big East Conference, having previously played in Conference USA.

== Roster ==
2005–06 Marquette Golden Eagles men's basketball team
Players
Coaches

Pos.	#	Name	Height	Weight	Year	Hometown
G	1	Dominic James	5 ft 11 in (1.8 m)	185 lb (84 kg)	Fr	Richmond, Indiana
F	5	Dan Fitzgerald	6 ft 9 in (2.06 m)	220 lb (100 kg)	RS So	Saint Paul, Minnesota
F	12	Dwight Burke	6 ft 8 in (2.03 m)	250 lb (113 kg)	Fr	Brooklyn, New York
F	20	Steve Novak	6 ft 10 in (2.08 m)	220 lb (100 kg)	Sr	Brown Deer, Wisconsin
G	22	Jerel McNeal	6 ft 3 in (1.91 m)	200 lb (91 kg)	Fr	Chicago, Illinois
G/F	23	Wesley Matthews	6 ft 5 in (1.96 m)	210 lb (95 kg)	Fr	Madison, Wisconsin
G	32	Joe Chapman	6 ft 4 in (1.93 m)	195 lb (88 kg)	Sr	Sauk Village, Illinois
C	33	Chris Grimm	6 ft 10 in (2.08 m)	225 lb (102 kg)	Sr	Brighton, Michigan
C	40	Mike Kinsella	7 ft 0 in (2.13 m)	245 lb (111 kg)	Jr	Rochester, Minnesota
F	41	Ousmane Barro	6 ft 10 in (2.08 m)	235 lb (107 kg)	So	Dakar, Senegal
G	42	Tommy Brice	5 ft 11 in (1.8 m)	174 lb (79 kg)	So	Bloomingdale, Illinois
F	51	Jamil Lott	6 ft 7 in (2.01 m)	225 lb (102 kg)	Jr	Saint Paul, Minnesota

Head coach

- Tom Crean

Assistant coach(es)

- Jason Rabadeaux
- Dan Panaggio
- Jean Prioleau

Legend

- (C) Team captain
- (S) Suspended
- (I) Ineligible
- (W) Walk-on
- Injured
- Current redshirt

== Schedule ==
Date time, TV	Rank^{#}	Opponent^{#}	Result	Record	Site city, state
Non-conference regular season
November 18*		Rice	W 82–65	1–0	Bradley Center; Milwaukee, Wisconsin
November 19*		Winthrop	L 64–71	1–1	Bradley Center; Milwaukee, Wisconsin
November 23*		vs. Eastern Washington; Great Alaska Shootout First Round	W 83–73	2–1	Sullivan Arena; Anchorage, Alaska
November 25*		vs. Oral Roberts; Great Alaska Shootout Semifinals	W 73–70	3–1	Sullivan Arena; Anchorage, Alaska
November 26*		vs. South Carolina; Great Alaska Shootout Championship game	W 92–89 ^{OT}	4–1	Sullivan Arena; Anchorage, Alaska
November 30*		at Nebraska	L 74–84	4–2	Bob Devaney Sports Center; Lincoln, Nebraska
December 3*		South Dakota State	W 87–52	5–2	Bradley Center; Milwaukee, Wisconsin
December 7*		Valparaiso	W 69–54	6–2	Bradley Center; Milwaukee, Wisconsin
December 10*		at Wisconsin	L 63–77	6–3	Kohl Center; Madison, Wisconsin
December 17*		San Francisco	W 61–48	7–3	Bradley Center; Milwaukee, Wisconsin
December 19*		Oakland	W 90–69	8–3	Bradley Center; Milwaukee, Wisconsin
December 22*		Delaware State	W 60–48	9–3	Bradley Center; Milwaukee, Wisconsin
December 28*		Lewis	W 88–40	10–3	Bradley Center; Milwaukee, Wisconsin
Big East regular season
January 3		No. 2 Connecticut	W 94–79	11–3 (1–0)	Bradley Center; Milwaukee, Wisconsin
January 7		Cincinnati	L 66–70	11–4 (1–1)	Bradley Center; Milwaukee, Wisconsin
January 11		at Seton Hall	W 67–63	12–4 (2–1)	Izod Center; East Rutherford, NJ
January 14		at No. 16 West Virginia	L 85–104	12–5 (2–2)	WVU Coliseum; Morgantown, WV
January 17		at DePaul	W 82–79	13–5 (3–2)	Allstate Arena; Rosemont, Illinois
January 20		Notre Dame	W 67–65	14–5 (4–2)	Bradley Center; Milwaukee, Wisconsin
January 25		DePaul	W 62–47	15–5 (5–2)	Bradley Center; Milwaukee, Wisconsin
January 28		at No. 12 Pittsburgh	L 71–77	15–6 (5–3)	Petersen Events Center; Pittsburgh, Pennsylvania
February 1		St. John's	W 81–61	16–6 (6–3)	Bradley Center; Milwaukee, Wisconsin
February 4		at No. 4 Villanova	L 67–72	16–7 (6–4)	Wells Fargo Center; Philadelphia, Pennsylvania
February 12		at Rutgers	L 84–91	16–8 (6–5)	Louis Brown Athletic Center; Piscataway, NJ
February 16		No. 17 Georgetown	W 57–51	17–8 (7–5)	Bradley Center; Milwaukee, Wisconsin
February 18		No. 9 Pittsburgh	W 84–82	18–8 (8–5)	Bradley Center; Milwaukee, Wisconsin
February 25		at Notre Dame	W 80–72	19–8 (9–5)	Joyce Center; South Bend, Indiana
March 1		at Louisville	L 60–67 ^{OT}	19–9 (9–6)	Freedom Hall; Louisville, Kentucky
March 4		Providence	W 88–78	20–9 (10–6)	Bradley Center; Milwaukee, Wisconsin
Big East tournament
March 9		vs. No. 23 Georgetown	L 59–62	20–10 (10–6)	Madison Square Garden; New York City, New York
NCAA tournament
March 16	(7)	vs. (10) Alabama; First Round	L 85–90	20–11 (10–6)	Viejas Arena; San Diego, California
*Non-conference game. ^{#}Rankings from AP Poll. (#) Tournament seedings in parentheses.
