= 2005–06 Cincinnati Bearcats men's basketball team =

American college basketball season

2005–06 Cincinnati Bearcats men's basketball

NIT, Quarterfinals
- Conference: Big East Conference (1979–2013)
- Record: 21–13 (8–8 Big East)
- Head coach: Andy Kennedy (1st season)
- Home arena: Fifth Third Arena

2005–06 Big East men's basketball standings
	Conf.				Overall
Team	W		L	PCT	W		L	PCT
No. 2 Connecticut	14	–	2	.875	30	–	4	.882
No. 3 Villanova	14	–	2	.875	28	–	5	.848
No. 22 West Virginia	11	–	5	.688	22	–	11	.667
Marquette	10	–	6	.625	20	–	11	.645
No. 23 Georgetown	10	–	6	.625	23	–	10	.697
No. 16 Pittsburgh	10	–	6	.625	25	–	8	.758
Seton Hall	9	–	7	.563	18	–	12	.600
Cincinnati	8	–	8	.500	21	–	13	.618
Rutgers	7	–	9	.438	19	–	14	.576
Louisville	6	–	10	.375	21	–	13	.618
Notre Dame	6	–	10	.375	16	–	14	.533
DePaul*	5	–	11	.313	12	–	15	.444
Providence*	5	–	11	.313	12	–	15	.444
St. John's*	5	–	11	.313	12	–	15	.444
South Florida*	1	–	15	.063	7	–	22	.241
No. 21 Syracuse†#	0	–	9	.000	0	–	12	.000
† 2006 Big East tournament winner As of April 3, 2006; Rankings from AP Poll; *Did not qualify for 2006 Big East tournament. #Syracuse had all its wins vacated due to sanctions against the program; Syracuse′s disputed record was 23–12, 7–9.

The 2005–06 Cincinnati Bearcats men's basketball team represented the University of Cincinnati during the 2005–06 NCAA Division I men's basketball season. The team played its home games in Cincinnati, Ohio at the Fifth Third Arena, which has a capacity of 13,176. They are members of the Big East Conference and were led by first-year head coach Andy Kennedy after the resignation of longtime coach Bob Huggins. The Bearcats finished the season 23–13, 8–8 in Big East play.

The Bearcats played in the 2006 NIT, as the 1 seed in their own region. The Bearcats advanced to the Quarterfinals, before losing to the eventual champion 3 seed South Carolina team.

== Previous season ==
The Bearcats finished the 2004–05 season 25–8, 12–4 in Conference USA play, finishing tied for second place. They entered as the No. 3 seed in the Conference USA tournament and were upset in the Quarterfinals by No. 11 seed South Florida.. The Bearcats were awarded an at-large bid to the 2005 NCAA Division I men's basketball tournament. As the No. 7 seed in the Austin region, they defeated No. 10 seed Iowa in the first round before falling to the No. 2 seed Kentucky.

Much of the offseason was filled with continued drama between then head coach Bob Huggins and University of Cincinnati president Nancy Zimpher. By late August, Huggins was given an ultimatum by Zimpher to resign or be fired. Huggins opted to resign and accept his buyout. Zimpher said that the Bearcat program under Huggins didn't fit with her plan to upgrade UC's academic reputation. However, she'd been seriously considering ousting Huggins since he was arrested for driving under the influence in 2004. He ultimately pleaded no contest to DUI.

Andy Kennedy was named head coach on an interim basis for the 2005–06 season.

== Roster ==
2005–06 Cincinnati Bearcats men's basketball team
Players
Coaches

Pos.	#	Name	Height	Weight	Year	Previous school	Hometown
F	1	DeAndre Coleman	6 ft 7 in (2.01 m)	235 lb (107 kg)	Fr	Stephenson High School	Stone Mountain, Georgia
G	1	Chadd Moore	6 ft 2 in (1.88 m)	175 lb (79 kg)	Sr	Lee High School	Huntsville, Alabama
G	2	Devan Downey	5 ft 10 in (1.78 m)	175 lb (79 kg)	Fr	Chester High School	Chester, South Carolina
G	3	Domonic Tilford	5 ft 11 in (1.8 m)	170 lb (77 kg)	Fr	Jeffersontown High School	Louisville, Kentucky
G	10	Pat Watt (W)	5 ft 10 in (1.78 m)	190 lb (86 kg)	Fr	Moeller High School	Cincinnati, Ohio
F	11	Connor Barwin (W)	6 ft 4 in (1.93 m)	240 lb (109 kg)	Fr	University of Detroit Jesuit High School	Southfield, Michigan
G	13	Jihad Muhammad	5 ft 11 in (1.8 m)	175 lb (79 kg)	Sr	San Jacinto College	Plainfield, New Jersey
F	14	Eric Hicks (C)	6 ft 7 in (2.01 m)	245 lb (111 kg)	Sr	James B. Dudley High School	Greensboro, North Carolina
G	20	Branden Miller (W)	6 ft 4 in (1.93 m)	210 lb (95 kg)	Fr	Indian Hill High School	Cincinnati, Ohio
F	21	James White	6 ft 7 in (2.01 m)	200 lb (91 kg)	Sr	Florida	Washington, D.C.
F	23	Ronald Allen	6 ft 9 in (2.06 m)	225 lb (102 kg)	Jr	Xavier University of Louisiana	Los Angeles, California
F	30	Cedric McGowan	6 ft 6 in (1.98 m)	230 lb (104 kg)	Jr	Kilgore College	Miami, Florida
G	32	Angelo Craig (W)	6 ft 5 in (1.96 m)	220 lb (100 kg)	Fr	Glenville High School	Cleveland, Ohio
G	33	Armein Kirkland	6 ft 8 in (2.03 m)	205 lb (93 kg)	Sr	Robert E. Lee High School	Tyler, Texas
F	51	Erick Murray (W)	6 ft 5 in (1.96 m)	230 lb (104 kg)	Jr	Westerville North High School	Westerville, Ohio
F	53	Scott Benken (W)	—	215 lb (98 kg)	Sr	Vanderbilt	Cincinnati, Ohio

Head coach

- Andy Kennedy (UAB)

Assistant coach(es)

Legend

- (C) Team captain
- (S) Suspended
- (I) Ineligible
- (W) Walk-on
- Injured
- Current redshirt

Roster
Last update: 9 Jun 2020

== Schedule and results ==
Date time, TV	Rank^{#}	Opponent^{#}	Result	Record	Site (attendance) city, state
Exhibition
November 3, 2005*; 7:00pm		Hillsdale	W 99–71		Fifth Third Arena; Cincinnati, OH
November 12, 2005*; 7:00pm		Northern Kentucky	W 96–60		Fifth Third Arena; Cincinnati, OH
Regular Season
November 19, 2005*; 7:00pm		Murray State	W 79–75 ^{OT}	1–0	Fifth Third Arena (8,088); Cincinnati, OH
November 22, 2005*; 8:00pm		Illinois State	W 76–59	2–0	Fifth Third Arena (8,802); Cincinnati, OH
November 25, 2005*; 8:00pm		Holy Cross	W 63–51	3–0	Fifth Third Arena (8,902); Cincinnati, OH
November 29, 2005*; 8:00pm		Dayton	L 66–75	3–1	Fifth Third Arena (9,199); Cincinnati, OH
December 3, 2005*; 3:00pm		No. 9 Memphis; Rivalry	L 81–91	3–2	Fifth Third Arena (9,440); Cincinnati, OH
December 10, 2005*; 6:00pm		at Vanderbilt	W 92–83	4–2	Memorial Gymnasium (13,032); Nashville, TN
December 14, 2005*; 8:00pm		Ohio	W 86–58	5–2	Fifth Third Arena (9,133); Cincinnati, OH
December 17, 2005*; 7:00pm		Tennessee Tech; Las Vegas Holiday Classic	W 105–62	6–2	Fifth Third Arena (7,011); Cincinnati, OH
December 19, 2005*; 7:00pm		Arkansas–Monticello; Las Vegas Holiday Classic	W 84–63	7–2	Fifth Third Arena (6,024); Cincinnati, OH
December 22, 2005*; 10:30pm		vs. Dayton; Las Vegas Holiday Classic	W 81–63	8–2	Valley High School (1,100); Las Vegas, Nevada
December 23, 2005*; 10:30pm		vs. LSU; Las Vegas Holiday Classic	W 75–72	9–2	Valley High School (1,200); Las Vegas, Nevada
December 28, 2005*; 8:00pm		Miami (OH)	W 75–65	10–2	US Bank Arena (11,786); Cincinnati, OH
December 30, 2005*; 7:00pm		North Carolina A&T	W 105–69	11–2	Fifth Third Arena (8,559); Cincinnati, OH
January 4, 2006; 7:00pm		DePaul	W 82–60	12–2 (1–0)	Fifth Third Arena (8,605); Cincinnati, OH
January 7, 2006; 12:00pm		at Marquette	W 70–66	13–2 (2–0)	Bradley Center (15,104); Milwaukee, WI
January 9, 2006; 7:00pm		at No. 2 Connecticut	L 59–70	13–3 (2–1)	Hartford Civic Center (16,294); Hartford, CT
January 14, 2006; 8:00pm	No. 25	Syracuse	L 58–77	13–4 (2–2)	Fifth Third Arena (13,176); Cincinnati, OH
January 19, 2006*; 9:00pm		at Xavier; Crosstown Shootout	L 71–73 ^{OT}	13–5	Cintas Center (10,250); Cincinnati, OH
January 22, 2006; 2:00pm		Rutgers	W 71–66	14–5 (3–2)	Fifth Third Arena (9,460); Cincinnati, OH
January 25, 2006; 7:30pm		at No. 22 Louisville; Rivalry	L 50–67	14–6 (3–3)	Freedom Hall (19,684); Louisville, KY
January 28, 2006; 12:00pm		at No. 21 Georgetown	L 57–76	14–7 (3–4)	Verizon Center (12,016); Washington, D.C.
January 31, 2006; 8:00pm		South Florida	W 73–60	15–7 (4–4)	Fifth Third Arena (7,764); Cincinnati, OH
February 4, 2006; 12:00pm		at No. 11 West Virginia	L 57–66	15–8 (4–5)	WVU Coliseum (12,480); Morgantown, WV
February 6, 2006; 7:00pm		Louisville; Rivalry	W 74–68	16–8 (5–5)	Fifth Third Arena (13,176); Cincinnati, OH
February 12, 2006; 8:00pm		at No. 14 Pittsburgh	L 69–89	16–9 (5–6)	Petersen Events Center (12,508); Pittsburgh, PA
February 15, 2006; 7:30pm		at Syracuse	W 85–65	17–9 (6–6)	Carrier Dome (21,459); Syracuse, NY
February 17, 2006; 8:00pm		Providence	W 66–64	18–9 (7–6)	Fifth Third Arena (12,127); Cincinnati, OH
February 23, 2006; 9:00pm		No. 2 Villanova	L 72–74	18–10 (7–7)	Fifth Third Arena (13,176); Cincinnati, OH
February 28, 2006; 8:00pm		at Seton Hall	L 62–72	18–11 (7–8)	Continental Airlines Arena (7,911); East Rutherford, NJ
March 4, 2006; 12:00pm		No. 16 West Virginia	W 78–75	19–11 (8–8)	Fifth Third Arena (13,176); Cincinnati, OH
Big East tournament
March 8, 2006; 12:00pm	(8)	vs. (9) Syracuse; First Round	L 73–74	19–12	Madison Square Garden (19,594); New York, NY
National Invitational Tournament
March 17, 2006; 8:00pm	(1)	(9) Charlotte; First Round	W 86–80	20–12	Fifth Third Arena (6,775); Cincinnati, OH
March 21, 2006; 9:00pm	(1)	(4) Minnesota; Second Round	W 76–62	21–12	Fifth Third Arena (5,651); Cincinnati, OH
March 23, 2006; 6:00pm	(1)	(3) South Carolina; Quarterfinal	L 62–65	21–13	Fifth Third Arena (7,775); Cincinnati, OH
*Non-conference game. ^{#}Rankings from AP Poll. (#) Tournament seedings in parentheses. All times are in Eastern Time.
