= 2005–06 Connecticut Huskies men's basketball team =

American college basketball season

2005–06 Connecticut Huskies men's basketball

Big East regular season co-champions Maui Invitational champions

NCAA tournament, Elite Eight
- Conference: Big East Conference

Ranking
- Coaches: No. 4
- AP: No. 2
- Record: 30–4 (14–2 Big East)
- Head coach: Jim Calhoun (20th season)
- Assistant coaches: Tom Moore; George Blaney; Andre LaFleur
- Home arena: Harry A. Gampel Pavilion

2005–06 Big East men's basketball standings
	Conf.				Overall
Team	W		L	PCT	W		L	PCT
No. 2 Connecticut	14	–	2	.875	30	–	4	.882
No. 3 Villanova	14	–	2	.875	28	–	5	.848
No. 22 West Virginia	11	–	5	.688	22	–	11	.667
Marquette	10	–	6	.625	20	–	11	.645
No. 23 Georgetown	10	–	6	.625	23	–	10	.697
No. 16 Pittsburgh	10	–	6	.625	25	–	8	.758
Seton Hall	9	–	7	.563	18	–	12	.600
Cincinnati	8	–	8	.500	21	–	13	.618
Rutgers	7	–	9	.438	19	–	14	.576
Louisville	6	–	10	.375	21	–	13	.618
Notre Dame	6	–	10	.375	16	–	14	.533
DePaul*	5	–	11	.313	12	–	15	.444
Providence*	5	–	11	.313	12	–	15	.444
St. John's*	5	–	11	.313	12	–	15	.444
South Florida*	1	–	15	.063	7	–	22	.241
No. 21 Syracuse†#	0	–	9	.000	0	–	12	.000
† 2006 Big East tournament winner As of April 3, 2006; Rankings from AP Poll; *Did not qualify for 2006 Big East tournament. #Syracuse had all its wins vacated due to sanctions against the program; Syracuse′s disputed record was 23–12, 7–9.

The 2005–06 Connecticut Huskies men's basketball team represented the University of Connecticut in the 2005–06 collegiate men's basketball season. The Huskies completed the season with a 30–4 overall record. The Huskies were members of the Big East Conference where they finished with a 14–2 record and were the regular season champions. UConn made it to the Elite Eight in the 2006 NCAA Division I men's basketball tournament before losing to George Mason 86–84 in overtime.

The Huskies played their home games at Harry A. Gampel Pavilion in Storrs, Connecticut and the Hartford Civic Center in Hartford, Connecticut, and they were led by twentieth-year head coach Jim Calhoun.

== Recruiting class ==
College recruiting
Name	Hometown	School	Height	Weight	Commit date
Jeff Adrien; PF	Brookline, Massachusetts	Brewster Academy	6 ft 6 in (1.98 m)	220 lb (100 kg)	Aug 18, 2004
Jeff Adrien; PF	Recruit ratings: Scout: Rivals:				
Craig Austrie; SG	Stamford, Connecticut	Trinity Catholic HS	6 ft 1 in (1.85 m)	175 lb (79 kg)	Mar 28, 2005
Craig Austrie; SG	Recruit ratings: Scout: Rivals:				
Andrew Bynum; C	Metuchen, New Jersey	St. Joseph HS	7 ft 0 in (2.13 m)	240 lb (110 kg)	Oct 26, 2004
Andrew Bynum; C	Recruit ratings: Scout: Rivals:				
Robert Garrison; PG	Niagara Falls, New York	Niagara Falls HS	6 ft 1 in (1.85 m)	175 lb (79 kg)	Jul 21, 2004
Robert Garrison; PG	Recruit ratings: Scout: Rivals:				
Marcus Johnson; SF	Los Angeles	Westchester Senior HS	6 ft 6 in (1.98 m)	200 lb (91 kg)	Sep 19, 2004
Marcus Johnson; SF	Recruit ratings: Scout: Rivals:				
Overall recruit ranking: Scout: 25 Rivals: 10
Note: In many cases, Scout, Rivals, 247Sports, On3, and ESPN may conflict in their listings of height and weight.; In these cases, the average was taken. ESPN grades are on a 100-point scale.; Sources: "Connecticut Commit List for 2005". Rivals.; "Men's Basketball Recruiting". Scout.; "ESPN – Connecticut Basketball Recruiting 2005". ESPN.; "Scout.com Team Recruiting Rankings". Scout.; "2005 Team Ranking". Rivals.

== Roster ==
Listed are the student athletes who are members of the 2005–2006 team.

#	Name	Position	Year
4	Jeff Adrien	Forward	Fr
31	Rashad Anderson	Guard	Sr
11	Hilton Armstrong	Forward	Sr
24	Craig Austrie	Guard	Fr
21	Josh Boone	Forward	Jr
33	Denham Brown	Forward	Sr
55	Nick Forostoski	Forward	Sr
35	Marty Gagne	Guard	Jr
25	Rob Garrison	Guard	Fr
22	Rudy Gay	Forward	So
1	Marcus Johnson	Forward	Fr
32	Ed Nelson	Forward	Sr
45	Osazee Omokaro	Forward	Sr
10	Ben Spencer	Guard	So
13	Ryan Thompson	Guard	Sr
5	Marcus Williams	Guard	Jr

== Schedule ==
Date time, TV	Rank^{#}	Opponent^{#}	Result	Record	Site (attendance) city, state
Exhibition
November 3, 2005*	No. 3	Bryant	W 109–62		Hartford Civic Center; Hartford, Connecticut
November 9, 2005*	No. 3	Concordia	W 106–47		Harry A. Gampel Pavilion; Storrs, Connecticut
Regular season
November 19, 2005*; 11:00 p.m., ESPNU	No. 3	at Pepperdine	W 75–56	1–0	Firestone Fieldhouse (3,210); Malibu, California
November 21, 2005*; 11:00 p.m., ESPN2	No. 3	vs. Arkansas; Maui Invitational Tournament	W 77–68	2–0	Lahaina Civic Center (2,400); Maui, HI
November 22, 2005*; 9:00 p.m., ESPN	No. 3	vs. No. 9 Arizona; Maui Invitational Tournament	W 79–70	3–0	Lahaina Civic Center (2,400); Maui, HI
November 23, 2005*; 9:30 p.m., ESPN	No. 3	vs. No. 8 Gonzaga; Maui Invitational Tournament	W 65–63	4–0	Lahaina Civic Center (2,400); Maui, HI
November 29, 2005*; 7:00 p.m., WTXX	No. 3	Army	W 68–54	5–0	Hartford Civic Center (16,294); Hartford, Connecticut
December 2, 2005*; 7:30 p.m., WTIC	No. 3	Texas Southern	W 113–49	6–0	Harry A. Gampel Pavilion (10,167); Storrs, Connecticut
December 8, 2005*; 9:00 p.m., ESPN2	No. 3	UMass	W 78–60	7–0	Hartford Civic Center (16,294); Hartford, Connecticut
December 18, 2005*; 2:00 p.m., WTXX	No. 2	New Hampshire	W 86–44	8–0	Hartford Civic Center (16,294); Hartford, Connecticut
December 23, 2005*; 2:00 p.m., WTIC	No. 2	Morehead State	W 129–61	9–0	Harry A. Gampel Pavilion (10,167); Storrs, Connecticut
December 28, 2005*; 7:00 p.m., WTXX	No. 2	Stony Brook	W 85–52	10–0	Hartford Civic Center (15,528); Hartford, Connecticut
December 30, 2005*; 7:00 p.m., WTIC	No. 2	Quinnipiac	W 111–75	11–0	Hartford Civic Center (16,294); Hartford, Connecticut
January 3, 2006; 9:00 p.m., WTIC	No. 2	at Marquette	L 79–94	11–1 (0–1)	Bradley Center (15,831); Milwaukee
January 7, 2006*; 4:00 p.m., CBS	No. 2	LSU	W 67–66	12–1	Hartford Civic Center (16,294); Hartford, Connecticut
January 9, 2006; 7:00 p.m., ESPN	No. 4	No. 25 Cincinnati	W 70–59	13–1 (1–1)	Hartford Civic Center (16,294); Hartford, Connecticut
January 14, 2006; 12:00 p.m., WTXX	No. 4	Georgetown; Rivalry	W 74–67	14–1 (2–1)	Hartford Civic Center (16,294); Hartford, Connecticut
January 16, 2006; 9:00 p.m., ESPN	No. 3	at No. 20 Syracuse; Rivalry	W 88–80	15–1 (3–1)	Carrier Dome (26,805); Syracuse, New York
January 21, 2006; 9:00 p.m., ESPN	No. 3	at No. 17 Louisville; ESPN College GameDay	W 71–58	16–1 (4–1)	Freedom Hall (20,091); Louisville, Kentucky
January 25, 2006; 7:30 p.m., WTXX	No. 1	St. John's	W 66–50	17–1 (5–1)	Harry A. Gampel Pavilion (10,167); Storrs, Connecticut
January 28, 2006; 2:00 p.m., WTIC	No. 1	at Providence	W 76–62	18–1 (6–1)	Dunkin' Donuts Center (12,993); Providence, Rhode Island
January 31, 2006; 7:30 p.m., WTXX	No. 1	No. 9 Pittsburgh	W 80–76	19–1 (7–1)	Harry A. Gampel Pavilion (10,167); Storrs, Connecticut
February 4, 2006*; 1:00 p.m., CBS	No. 1	at No. 22 Indiana	W 88–80	20–1	Assembly Hall (17,324); Bloomington, Indiana
February 8, 2006; 9:00 p.m., ESPN	No. 1	Syracuse; Rivalry	W 73–50	21–1 (8–1)	Hartford Civic Center (16,294); Hartford, Connecticut
February 11, 2006; 8:00 p.m., WTIC	No. 1	at Seton Hall	W 99–57	22–1 (9–1)	Continental Airlines Arena (13,996); East Rutherford, New Jersey
February 13, 2006; 7:00 p.m., ESPN	No. 1	at No. 4 Villanova	L 64–69	22–2 (9–2)	Wachovia Center (20,859); Philadelphia
February 18, 2006; 3:45 p.m., CBS	No. 1	at No. 11 West Virginia	W 81–75	23–2 (10–2)	WVU Coliseum (14,683); Morgantown, West Virginia
February 21, 2006; 7:00 p.m., WTXX	No. 3	Notre Dame	W 75–74 ^{OT}	24–2 (11–2)	Hartford Civic Center (16,294); Hartford, Connecticut
February 26, 2006; 2:00 p.m., CBS	No. 3	No. 2 Villanova	W 89–75	25–2 (12–2)	Harry A. Gampel Pavilion (10,167); Storrs, Connecticut
March 1, 2006; 7:00 p.m., WTXX	No. 2	at South Florida	W 66–53	26–2 (13–2)	USF Sun Dome (9,636); Tampa, Florida
March 4, 2006; 2:00 p.m., CBS	No. 2	Louisville	W 84–80	27–2 (14–2)	Harry A. Gampel Pavilion (10,167); Storrs, Connecticut
Big East Tournament
March 9, 2006; 12:00 p.m., ESPN	(1) No. 1	vs. (9) Syracuse; Quarterfinals/Rivalry	L 84–86 ^{OT}	27–3	Madison Square Garden (19,594); New York City
NCAA tournament
March 17, 2006*; 7:25 p.m., CBS	(1 W) No. 2	vs. (16 W) Albany; First Round	W 72–59	28–3	Wachovia Center (19,990); Philadelphia
March 19, 2006*; 2:30 p.m., CBS	(1 W) No. 2	vs. (8 W) Kentucky; Second Round	W 87–83	29–3	Wachovia Center (19,990); Philadelphia
March 24, 2006*; 9:50 p.m., CBS	(1 W) No. 2	vs. (5 W) No. 17 Washington; Sweet Sixteen	W 98–92 ^{OT}	30–3	Verizon Center (19,638); Washington, D.C.
March 26, 2006*; 2:40 p.m., CBS	(1 W) No. 2	vs. (11 W) George Mason; Elite Eight	L 84–86 ^{OT}	30–4	Verizon Center (19,718); Washington, D.C.
*Non-conference game. ^{#}Rankings from AP Poll. (#) Tournament seedings in parentheses.

== NCAA basketball tournament ==
Their Elite Eight matchup found themselves facing the George Mason Patriots. The Patriots were able to defeat the top-seeded Huskies, 86–84 in overtime, in what is recognized as one of the most memorable games in tournament history.

- East
  - Connecticut 72, Albany 59
  - Connecticut 87, Kentucky 83
  - Connecticut 98, Washington 92
  - George Mason 86, Connecticut 84

== Team players drafted into the NBA ==
Round	Pick	Player	NBA club
1	8	Rudy Gay	Houston Rockets
1	12	Hilton Armstrong	New Orleans/Oklahoma City Hornets
1	22	Marcus Williams	New Jersey Nets
1	23	Josh Boone	New Jersey Nets
2	40	Denham Brown	Seattle SuperSonics

== See also ==
- Connecticut Huskies men's basketball
- 2006 NCAA Division I men's basketball tournament
