= 2005–06 Providence Friars men's basketball team =

American college basketball season

2005–06 Providence Friars men's basketball
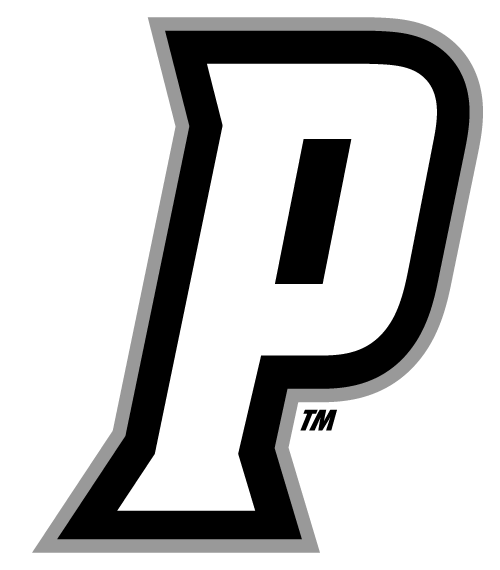
- Conference: Big East Conference
- Record: 12-15 (5-11 Big East)
- Head coach: Tim Welsh
- Home arena: Dunkin' Donuts Center

2005–06 Big East men's basketball standings
	Conf.				Overall
Team	W		L	PCT	W		L	PCT
No. 2 Connecticut	14	–	2	.875	30	–	4	.882
No. 3 Villanova	14	–	2	.875	28	–	5	.848
No. 22 West Virginia	11	–	5	.688	22	–	11	.667
Marquette	10	–	6	.625	20	–	11	.645
No. 23 Georgetown	10	–	6	.625	23	–	10	.697
No. 16 Pittsburgh	10	–	6	.625	25	–	8	.758
Seton Hall	9	–	7	.563	18	–	12	.600
Cincinnati	8	–	8	.500	21	–	13	.618
Rutgers	7	–	9	.438	19	–	14	.576
Louisville	6	–	10	.375	21	–	13	.618
Notre Dame	6	–	10	.375	16	–	14	.533
DePaul*	5	–	11	.313	12	–	15	.444
Providence*	5	–	11	.313	12	–	15	.444
St. John's*	5	–	11	.313	12	–	15	.444
South Florida*	1	–	15	.063	7	–	22	.241
No. 21 Syracuse†#	0	–	9	.000	0	–	12	.000
† 2006 Big East tournament winner As of April 3, 2006; Rankings from AP Poll; *Did not qualify for 2006 Big East tournament. #Syracuse had all its wins vacated due to sanctions against the program; Syracuse′s disputed record was 23–12, 7–9.

The 2005–06 Providence Friars men's basketball team represented Providence College in the Big East Conference. The team finished with a 12–15 record.

Providence failed to qualify for the Big East tournament and their season ended on March 4, 2006, with a 88–78 loss to Marquette.

== Season summary ==
The 2005–06 Friars were led by head coach Tim Welsh, who was in his 8th season leading the program. The team captain was guard Donnie McGrath who was also the team’s leading scorer averaging 15.1 points per game. McGrath was named to the 2005-06 All-Big East Second Team.

Providence finished their non-conference schedule with a 7–4 record, following a 94-81 win over Loyola (MD). However, the team struggled to start Big East play, losing four in a row before getting their first conference win 76–75 over DePaul on January 21, 2006. The Friars still had a chance to qualify for the 2006 Big East tournament late in the year but three straight losses to end the season to Pittsburgh, Notre Dame, and Marquette ended their season, falling short of the top 12 needed to qualify.

This season marked the second straight losing season for the Friars and fewest wins in a season since 1999–2000 when they went 11-19.

== Schedule and results ==
Date time, TV	Rank^{#}	Opponent^{#}	Result	Record	Site city, state
Nov. 5, 2005*		Laval University; Exhibition	W 101-92		
Nov. 8, 2005*		EA Sports All-Stars; Exhibition	W 77-75		
Nov. 21, 2005*		Vermont	W 87-77		
Nov. 23, 2005*		New Hampshire	W 75-51		
Nov. 28, 2005*		Fairfield	W 81-78		
Nov. 30, 2005*		Wichita State	L 74-82		
Dec. 3, 2005*		Rhode Island	L 69-77		
Dec. 2005*		Florida	L 77-87		
Dec. 2005*		Memphis	L 89-97		
Dec. 2005*		Northeastern	W 92-70		
Dec. 2005*		Yale	W 76-63		
Dec. 2005*		San Diego State	W 80-65		
Jan. 2006*		Loyola (MD)	W 94-81		
Jan. 2006		Georgetown	L 62-72		
Jan. 2006		Louisville	L 67-72		
Jan. 2006		Notre Dame	L 77-92		
Jan. 2006		West Virginia	L 48-64		
Jan. 2006		DePaul	W 76-75		
Jan. 2006		Rutgers	W 79-69		
Jan. 2006		UConn	L 62-76		
Feb. 2006		Seton Hall	L 74-77		
Feb. 2006		St. John’s	W 81-73		
Feb. 2006		DePaul	W 61-60		
Feb. 2006		Pittsburgh	L 77-85		
Feb. 2006		Cincinnati	L 64-66		
Feb. 2006		South Florida	W 77-56		
Feb. 2006		Pittsburgh	L 68-81		
Mar. 2006		Notre Dame	L 75-82		
Mar. 2006		Marquette	L 78-88		
*Non-conference game. ^{#}Rankings from AP Poll. (#) Tournament seedings in parentheses.
