= 2005–06 Villanova Wildcats men's basketball team =

American college basketball season

2005–06 Villanova Wildcats men's basketball

Big East regular season co-champions

NCAA tournament, Elite Eight
- Conference: Big East Conference

Ranking
- Coaches: No. 5
- AP: No. 3
- Record: 28–5 (14–2 Big East)
- Head coach: Jay Wright (5th season)
- Assistant coaches: Brett Gunning; Ed Pinckney; Pat Chambers
- Home arena: The Pavilion

2005–06 Big East men's basketball standings
	Conf.				Overall
Team	W		L	PCT	W		L	PCT
No. 2 Connecticut	14	–	2	.875	30	–	4	.882
No. 3 Villanova	14	–	2	.875	28	–	5	.848
No. 22 West Virginia	11	–	5	.688	22	–	11	.667
Marquette	10	–	6	.625	20	–	11	.645
No. 23 Georgetown	10	–	6	.625	23	–	10	.697
No. 16 Pittsburgh	10	–	6	.625	25	–	8	.758
Seton Hall	9	–	7	.563	18	–	12	.600
Cincinnati	8	–	8	.500	21	–	13	.618
Rutgers	7	–	9	.438	19	–	14	.576
Louisville	6	–	10	.375	21	–	13	.618
Notre Dame	6	–	10	.375	16	–	14	.533
DePaul*	5	–	11	.313	12	–	15	.444
Providence*	5	–	11	.313	12	–	15	.444
St. John's*	5	–	11	.313	12	–	15	.444
South Florida*	1	–	15	.063	7	–	22	.241
No. 21 Syracuse†#	0	–	9	.000	0	–	12	.000
† 2006 Big East tournament winner As of April 3, 2006; Rankings from AP Poll; *Did not qualify for 2006 Big East tournament. #Syracuse had all its wins vacated due to sanctions against the program; Syracuse′s disputed record was 23–12, 7–9.

The 2005–06 Villanova Wildcats men's basketball team represented Villanova University in the 2005–06 college basketball season. This team is typically credited with re-establishing Villanova as a national powerhouse after nearly two decades of underwhelming performances.

Villanova, led by head coach Jay Wright, spent most of the season competing with Duke and Big East rival Connecticut for possession of the top spot in the college basketball rankings. Utilizing a starting lineup that consisted of four guards (seniors Randy Foye and Allan Ray, junior Mike Nardi, and sophomore Kyle Lowry) and a center (junior Will Sheridan), Villanova played a fast-paced style of basketball that became a common topic of intrigue among analysts. Villanova entered the NCAA tournament as a number one seed and made an Elite Eight appearance before losing to eventual champion Florida.

Four players from the 2005–06 Villanova Wildcat team currently have played in the NBA: Randy Foye, Allan Ray, Kyle Lowry, and Dante Cunningham. As of 2022, only Kyle Lowry remains in the NBA.

== Class of 2005 ==
College recruiting
Name	Hometown	School	Height	Weight	Commit date
Dwayne Anderson; SF	Oakdale, Connecticut	St. Thomas More School	6 ft 5 in (1.96 m)	185 lb (84 kg)	Nov 12, 2003
Dwayne Anderson; SF	Recruit ratings: Scout: Rivals:				
Bilal Benn; SG	Chatham, Virginia	Hargrave Military Academy	6 ft 4 in (1.93 m)	180 lb (82 kg)	Feb 25, 2005
Bilal Benn; SG	Recruit ratings: Scout: Rivals:				
Dante Cunningham; PF	Washington, D.C.	St. Johns College HS	6 ft 7 in (2.01 m)	190 lb (86 kg)	Oct 5, 2004
Dante Cunningham; PF	Recruit ratings: Scout: Rivals:				
Frank Tchulsi; PF	Newark, New Jersey	St. Benedict Prep	6 ft 7 in (2.01 m)	200 lb (91 kg)	Nov 18, 2004
Frank Tchulsi; PF	Recruit ratings: Scout: Rivals:				
Overall Recruiting Rankings: Scout – NR Rivals – NR ESPN –

== Roster ==
Villanova Basketball; 2005–06 Roster
G	23	Dwayne Anderson	FR	Washington, D.C. (St. Johns College HS)
F	44	Marcus Austin	SR	Irvington, New Jersey (St. Patrick's HS)
G	3	Bilal Benn	FR	Philadelphia, Pennsylvania (Cardinal Dougherty HS)
F	21	Chris Charles	SR	Milwaukee, Wisconsin (Crispus Attucks HS)
F	20	Shane Clark	FR	Chatham, Virginia (Hargrave Military Academy)
G	4	Ross Condon	JR	Springfield, Virginia (Potomac School)
F	33	Dante Cunningham	FR	Washington, D.C. (St. Johns College HS)
G	22	Baker Dunleavy	JR	Portland, Oregon (Lawrenceville Prep)
G	2	Randy Foye	SR	Newark, New Jersey (East Side HS)
F	20	Jason Fraser	SR	Amityville, New York (Amityville Memorial HS)
G	1	Kyle Lowry	SO	Philadelphia, Pennsylvania (Cardinal Dougherty HS)
G	12	Mike Nardi	JR	Elizabeth, New Jersey (St. Patrick's)
G	14	Allan Ray	SR	Bronx, New York (St. Raymond's HS)
F	50	Will Sheridan	JR	Hockessin, Delaware (Sanford School)
F	34	Curtis Sumpter	SR	Brooklyn, New York (Bishop Loughlin)
F	42	Frank Tchuisi	FR	Douala, Cameroon (St. Benedict's)

== Coaching staff ==
Jay Wright – Head Coach

== Schedule ==
Date time, TV	Rank^{#}	Opponent^{#}	Result	Record	Site (attendance) city, state
Regular season
November 18, 2005*; 7:30 p.m.	No. 5	Stony Brook	W 78–35	1–0	The Pavilion (6,500); Villanova, Pennsylvania
November 27, 2005*; 7:30 p.m.	No. 4	Lehigh	W 84–47	2–0	The Pavilion (6,500); Villanova, Pennsylvania
November 30, 2005*; 7:30 p.m.	No. 4	Rider	W 86–57	3–0	Sovereign Bank Arena (7,255); Trenton, New Jersey
December 3, 2005*; 5:00 p.m., ESPN	No. 4	No. 5 Oklahoma	W 85–74	4–0	The Pavilion (6,500); Villanova, Pennsylvania
December 6, 2005*; 7:00 p.m., ESPN3	No. 4	at Bucknell	W 79–60	5–0	Sojka Pavilion (4,433); Lewisburg, Pennsylvania
December 10, 2005*; 7:30 p.m.	No. 4	vs. Longwood	W 90–77	6–0	Boardwalk Hall (7,007); Atlantic City, New Jersey
December 13, 2005*; 8:00 p.m., CN8	No. 3	at Penn; Philadelphia Big 5	W 62–55	7–0	The Palestra (6,839); Philadelphia, Pennsylvania
December 22, 2005*; 7:30 p.m.	No. 3	La Salle; Philadelphia Big 5	W 98–57	8–0	The Pavilion (6,500); Villanova, Pennsylvania
December 31, 2005*; 4:00 p.m., CN8	No. 3	vs. Temple; Philadelphia Big 5	W 75–53	9–0	The Palestra (8,722); Philadelphia, Pennsylvania
January 5, 2006; 7:00 p.m., ESPN2	No. 3	at No. 9 Louisville	W 76–67	10–0 (1–0)	Freedom Hall (20,058); Louisville, Kentucky
January 8, 2006; 12:00 p.m., ESPN Plus	No. 3	No. 24 West Virginia	L 87–91	10–1 (1–1)	The Pavilion (6,500); Villanova, Pennsylvania
January 11, 2006; 7:00 p.m., ESPN Plus	No. 3	at Rutgers	W 84–78 ^{OT}	11–1 (2–1)	Louis Brown Athletic Center (8,043); Piscataway, New Jersey
January 14, 2006*; 1:00 p.m., CBS	No. 3	at No. 8 Texas	L 55–58	11–2	Frank Erwin Center (16,755); Austin, Texas
January 17, 2006; 7:30 p.m., ESPN Classic	No. 8	Seton Hall	W 73–64	12–2 (3–1)	The Pavilion (6,500); Villanova, Pennsylvania
January 21, 2006; 6:00 p.m., ESPN	No. 8	No. 20 Syracuse	W 80–65	13–2 (4–1)	Wachovia Center (20,581); Philadelphia, Pennsylvania
January 24, 2006; 7:00 p.m., ESPN3	No. 6	at South Florida	W 49–46	14–2 (5–1)	USF Sun Dome (5,643); Tampa, Florida
January 28, 2006; 6:00 p.m., ESPN2	No. 6	at Notre Dame	W 72–70	15–2 (6–1)	Joyce Center (11,418); South Bend, Indiana
January 30, 2006; 7:00 p.m., ESPN	No. 4	Louisville	W 79–73	16–2 (7–1)	Wachovia Center (19,448); Philadelphia, Pennsylvania
February 4, 2006; 7:00 p.m., ESPN Plus	No. 4	Marquette	W 72–67	17–2 (8–1)	The Pavilion (6,500); Villanova, Pennsylvania
February 7, 2006*; 7:30 p.m., ESPN2	No. 4	vs. Saint Joseph's; Philadelphia Big 5	W 71–58	18–2	The Palestra (8,722); Philadelphia, Pennsylvania
February 11, 2006; 2:00 p.m., ESPN	No. 4	at DePaul	W 61–51	19–2 (9–1)	Allstate Arena (14,906); Chicago, Illinois
February 13, 2006; 7:00 p.m., ESPN	No. 4	No. 1 Connecticut	W 69–64	20–2 (10–1)	Wachovia Center (20,859); Philadelphia, Pennsylvania
February 19, 2006; 12:00 p.m., ESPN Plus	No. 4	No. 17 Georgetown	W 75–65	21–2 (11–1)	The Pavilion (6,500); Villanova, Pennsylvania
February 23, 2006; 9:00 p.m., ESPN	No. 2	at Cincinnati	W 74–72	22–2 (12–1)	Fifth Third Arena (13,176); Cincinnati, Ohio
February 26, 2006; 2:00 p.m., CBS	No. 2	at No. 3 Connecticut	L 75–89	22–3 (12–2)	Harry A. Gampel Pavilion (10,167); Storrs, Connecticut
March 1, 2006; 7:30 p.m., ESPN3	No. 4	at St. John's	W 65–52	23–3 (13–2)	The Pavilion (6,500); Villanova, Pennsylvania
March 5, 2006; 12:00 p.m., CBS	No. 4	at Syracuse	W 92–82	24–3 (14–2)	Carrier Dome (33,633); Syracuse, New York
Big East Tournament
March 9, 2006; 7:00 p.m., ESPN2	(2) No. 2	vs. (10) Rutgers; Quarterfinals	W 87–55	25–3	Madison Square Garden (19,594); New York, New York
March 10, 2006; 9:00 p.m., ESPN	(2) No. 2	vs. (6) No. 15 Pittsburgh; Semifinals	L 54–68	25–4	Madison Square Garden (19,594); New York, NY
NCAA tournament
March 17, 2006*; 2:50 p.m., CBS	(1 M) No. 3	vs. (16 M) Monmouth; First Round	W 58–45	26–4	Wachovia Center (19,900); Philadelphia, Pennsylvania
March 19, 2006*; 5:00 p.m., CBS	(1 M) No. 3	vs. (8 M) Arizona; Second Round	W 82–78	27–4	Wachovia Center (20,050); Philadelphia, Pennsylvania
March 24, 2006*; 7:10 p.m., CBS	(1 M) No. 3	vs. (4 M) No. 7 Boston College; Sweet Sixteen	W 60–59 ^{OT}	28–4	Hubert H. Humphrey Metrodome (22,293); Minneapolis, Minnesota
March 17, 2006*; 5:05 p.m., CBS	(1 M) No. 3	vs. (3 M) No. 11 Florida; Elite Eight	L 62–75	28–5	Hubert H. Humphrey Metrodome (21,613); Minneapolis, Minnesota
*Non-conference game. ^{#}Rankings from AP Poll. (#) Tournament seedings in parentheses.

== Awards and honors ==
- Randy Foye, Consensus first-team All-American
- Allan Ray, Consensus second-team All-American
- Randy Foye, Big East Player of the Year
- Randy Foye, First-team All-Big East
- Allan Ray, First-team All-Big East
- Kyle Lowry, Second-team All-Big East
- Randy Foye, Robert V. Geasey Trophy
