= 2005–06 West Virginia Mountaineers men's basketball team =

American college basketball season

2005–06 West Virginia Mountaineers men's basketball

NCAA tournament, Sweet Sixteen
- Conference: Big East Conference

Ranking
- Coaches: No. 15
- AP: No. 22
- Record: 22–11 (11–5 Big East)
- Head coach: John Beilein (4th season)
- Assistant coach: Jerry Dunn
- Home arena: WVU Coliseum

2005–06 Big East men's basketball standings
| | Conf. | | | | Overall |
| Team | W | | L | PCT | W | | L | PCT |
|---|---|---|---|---|---|---|---|---|
| No. 2 Connecticut | 14 | – | 2 | .875 | 30 | – | 4 | .882 |
| No. 3 Villanova | 14 | – | 2 | .875 | 28 | – | 5 | .848 |
| No. 22 West Virginia | 11 | – | 5 | .688 | 22 | – | 11 | .667 |
| Marquette | 10 | – | 6 | .625 | 20 | – | 11 | .645 |
| No. 23 Georgetown | 10 | – | 6 | .625 | 23 | – | 10 | .697 |
| No. 16 Pittsburgh | 10 | – | 6 | .625 | 25 | – | 8 | .758 |
| Seton Hall | 9 | – | 7 | .563 | 18 | – | 12 | .600 |
| Cincinnati | 8 | – | 8 | .500 | 21 | – | 13 | .618 |
| Rutgers | 7 | – | 9 | .438 | 19 | – | 14 | .576 |
| Louisville | 6 | – | 10 | .375 | 21 | – | 13 | .618 |
| Notre Dame | 6 | – | 10 | .375 | 16 | – | 14 | .533 |
| DePaul* | 5 | – | 11 | .313 | 12 | – | 15 | .444 |
| Providence* | 5 | – | 11 | .313 | 12 | – | 15 | .444 |
| St. John's* | 5 | – | 11 | .313 | 12 | – | 15 | .444 |
| South Florida* | 1 | – | 15 | .063 | 7 | – | 22 | .241 |
| No. 21 Syracuse†# | 0 | – | 9 | .000 | 0 | – | 12 | .000 |
† 2006 Big East tournament winner As of April 3, 2006; Rankings from AP Poll; *Did not qualify for 2006 Big East tournament. #Syracuse had all its wins vacated due to sanctions against the program; Syracuse′s disputed record was 23–12, 7–9.

The 2005–06 West Virginia Mountaineers men's basketball team represented West Virginia University from Morgantown, West Virginia during the 2005-06 season. The team was led by head coach John Beilein and played their home games at WVU Coliseum. After an early exit in the quarterfinal round of the Big East tournament, the Mountaineers would gain an at-large bid to the NCAA tournament, where they would make a run to the Sweet Sixteen for the second straight season. The team finished with a 22–11 record (11–5 Big East).

== Roster ==
2005–06 West Virginia Mountaineers men's basketball team
Players
Coaches

| Pos. | # | Name | Height | Weight | Year | Previous school | Hometown |
|---|---|---|---|---|---|---|---|
| G | 1 | J. D. Collins | 5 ft 10 in (1.78 m) | 180 lb (82 kg) | Sr | | Houston, Texas |
| F | 3 | Patrick Beilein | 6 ft 4 in (1.93 m) | 205 lb (93 kg) | Sr | Benedictine | Richmond, Virginia |
| G | 5 | Johannes Herber | 6 ft 5 in (1.96 m) | 210 lb (95 kg) | Sr | | Darmstadt, West Germany |
| G | 11 | Joe Alexander | 6 ft 8 in (2.03 m) | 230 lb (104 kg) | Fr | Linganore | Mount Airy, Maryland |
| G | 20 | Mike Gansey | 6 ft 4 in (1.93 m) | 185 lb (84 kg) | Sr | St. Bonaventure | Olmsted Falls, Ohio |
| C | 34 | Kevin Pittsnogle | 6 ft 11 in (2.11 m) | 245 lb (111 kg) | Sr | Martinsburg | Martinsburg, West Virginia |

Head coach

- John Beilein

Assistant coach(es)

- Jerry Dunn

Legend

- (C) Team captain
- (S) Suspended
- (I) Ineligible
- (W) Walk-on
- Injured
- Current redshirt

== Schedule and results ==
| Date time, TV | Rank^{#} | Opponent^{#} | Result | Record | Site city, state |
Regular season
| Nov 12, 2005* | No. 14 | Louisiana-Monroe | W 88–69 | 1–0 | WVU Coliseum; Morgantown, West Virginia |
| Nov 13, 2005* | No. 14 | Wofford | W 61–41 | 2–0 | WVU Coliseum; Morgantown, West Virginia |
| Nov 21, 2005* | No. 13 | vs. No. 2 Texas; Guardians Classic | L 75–76 | 2–1 | Municipal Auditorium; Kansas City, Missouri |
| Nov 22, 2005* | No. 13 | vs. No. 7 Kentucky; Guardians Classic | L 66–80 | 2–2 | Municipal Auditorium; Kansas City, Missouri |
| Nov 26, 2005* | No. 13 | LSU | L 68–71 ^{OT} | 2–3 | WVU Coliseum; Morgantown, West Virginia |
| Nov 30, 2005* | | vs. St. Bonaventure | W 66–61 | 3–3 | Blue Cross Arena; Rochester, New York |
| Dec 3, 2005* | | Washington and Lee | W 83–33 | 4–3 | WVU Coliseum; Morgantown, West Virginia |
| Dec 7, 2005* | | UMBC | W 82–53 | 5–3 | WVU Coliseum; Morgantown, West Virginia |
| Dec 10, 2005* | | Duquesne | W 86–66 | 6–3 | WVU Coliseum; Morgantown, West Virginia |
| Dec 22, 2005* | | vs. No. 7 Oklahoma; All-College Basketball Classic | W 92–68 | 7–3 | Ford Center; Oklahoma City |
| Dec 30, 2005* | No. 25 | Canisius | W 80–68 | 8–3 | WVU Coliseum; Morgantown, West Virginia |
| Jan 5, 2006 | No. 24 | at South Florida | W 57–53 | 9–3 (1–0) | Sun Dome; Tampa, Florida |
| Jan 8, 2006 | No. 24 | at No. 3 Villanova | W 91–87 | 10–3 (2–0) | The Pavilion; Philadelphia, Pennsylvania |
| Jan 11, 2006 | No. 16 | Georgetown | W 68–61 | 11–3 (3–0) | WVU Coliseum; Morgantown, West Virginia |
| Jan 14, 2006 | No. 16 | Marquette | W 104–85 | 12–3 (4–0) | WVU Coliseum; Morgantown, West Virginia |
| Jan 17, 2006 | No. 12 | Providence | W 64–48 | 13–3 (5–0) | WVU Coliseum; Morgantown, West Virginia |
| Jan 21, 2006* | No. 12 | at No. 18 UCLA | W 60–56 | 14–3 | Pauley Pavilion; Los Angeles, California |
| Jan 25, 2006* | No. 9 | vs. Marshall | L 52–58 | 14–4 | Charleston Civic Center; Charleston, West Virginia |
| Jan 29, 2006 | No. 9 | at St. John's | W 66–61 | 15–4 (6–0) | Madison Square Garden; New York, New York |
| Feb 1, 2006 | No. 11 | Notre Dame | W 71–70 | 16–4 (7–0) | WVU Coliseum; Morgantown, West Virginia |
| Feb 4, 2006 | No. 11 | Cincinnati | W 66–57 | 17–4 (8–0) | WVU Coliseum; Morgantown, West Virginia |
| Feb 9, 2006 | No. 9 | at No. 14 Pittsburgh | L 53–57 | 17–5 (8–1) | Petersen Events Center; Pittsburgh, Pennsylvania |
| Feb 12, 2006 | No. 9 | at No. 15 Georgetown | W 69–56 | 18–5 (9–1) | Verizon Center; Washington, D.C. |
| Feb 14, 2006 | No. 11 | at Seton Hall | L 64–71 | 18–6 (9–2) | Continental Airlines Arena; East Rutherford, New Jersey |
| Feb 18, 2006 | No. 11 | No. 1 Connecticut | L 75–81 | 18–7 (9–3) | WVU Coliseum; Morgantown, West Virginia |
| Feb 20, 2006 | No. 14 | at Syracuse | L 58–60 | 18–8 (9–4) | Carrier Dome; Syracuse, New York |
| Feb 25, 2006 | No. 14 | Louisville | W 68–64 | 19–8 (10–4) | WVU Coliseum; Morgantown, West Virginia |
| Feb 27, 2006 | No. 16 | No. 8 Pittsburgh | W 67–62 | 20–8 (11–4) | WVU Coliseum; Morgantown, West Virginia |
| Mar 4, 2006 | No. 16 | at Cincinnati | L 75–78 | 20–9 (11–5) | Fifth Third Arena; Cincinnati, Ohio |
Big East tournament
| Mar 9, 2006* | No. 19 | vs. No. 15 Pittsburgh; Quarterfinals | L 57–68 | 20–10 | Madison Square Garden; New York, New York |
NCAA Tournament
| Mar 17, 2006* | (6 ATL) No. 22 | vs. (11 ATL) Southern Illinois; First round | W 64–46 | 21–10 | Palace of Auburn Hills; Auburn Hills, Michigan |
| Mar 19, 2006* | (6 ATL) No. 22 | vs. Northwestern State; Second round | W 67–54 | 22–10 | Palace of Auburn Hills; Auburn Hills, Michigan |
| Mar 23, 2006* | (6 ATL) No. 22 | vs. (2 ATL) No. 9 Texas; Regional semifinal – Sweet Sixteen | L 71–74 | 22–11 | Georgia Dome; Atlanta, Georgia |
*Non-conference game. ^{#}Rankings from AP poll. (#) Tournament seedings in parentheses. ATL=Atlanta.
