= Craig Austrie =

American basketball player (born 1987)

Personal information
- Born: March 17, 1987 (age 39) Bronx, New York, U.S.
- Listed height: 6 ft 3 in (1.91 m)
- Listed weight: 185 lb (84 kg)

Career information
- High school: Trinity Catholic (Stamford, Connecticut)
- College: UConn (2005–2009)
- NBA draft: 2009: undrafted
- Position: Point guard

Career history
- 2009–2010: Springfield Armor

Craig Kevin Austrie (born March 14, 1987) is an American basketball player. He played in college for the University of Connecticut and played briefly for the Springfield Armor in the NBA Development League.

== High school career ==
In his four years, Trinity Catholic went 103–6, captured three league titles, two state titles and was state runner-up twice. The Crusaders went 26–2 in his senior season (2005) as he averaged 22.5 points, 5.1 assists, 4.3 rebounds and 3.1 steals. Austrie won Gatorade's Connecticut high school basketball player of the year award in his senior season.

== College career ==
Austrie had originally given a verbal commitment to play for Steve Lappas at UMass. However, Lappas was fired during Austrie's senior year in high school, and Austrie re-opened his search. He then committed to UConn, his home state school, after also considering Florida, Pittsburgh, Providence, St. John's, and USC.

=== 2005–06 (Freshman) ===
Played in all 34 games, starting the first 24 games. Had a UConn-freshman record 14 assists in the win over Quinnipiac. Had a career-best 15 points in the win over Arizona.

=== 2006–07 (Sophomore) ===
Saw action in all 30 games making 6 starts for the Huskies. Reached double-figures in scoring on eight occasions, including a season-high 14 points against Big East Conference rival Syracuse.

=== 2007–08 (Junior) ===
Saw action in 31 games this season, making 16 starts. He maintained an 89.2 free throw percentage, with a 24-for-31 mark when shooting in the final two minutes of games. He was noted for his calm and composed demeanor late in games, having been described by the coaching staff as "solemn but normal". In the game at South Florida, Austrie hit an off-balance jump shot as time expired to give the Huskies a 74–73 win.

=== 2008–09 (Senior) ===
Started in 23 of 36 games in his senior season and helped the Huskies get to the Final Four.

Austrie currently ranks third all-time at UConn in career free throw percentage (83.0). He graduated from UConn in 2009.

== Pro career ==
Austrie was picked 3rd in the 4th round of the 2009 NBDL draft by the Springfield Armor. He played in 5 games, averaging 7.6 points and 1.6 assists per game. He was waived by the club on December 11, 2009. Ironically, he was replaced on the Armor's roster by Chris Lowe, who was recruited to UMass to fill the point guard role that was intended for Austrie.

Since his stint with the Armor, Austrie has started his own business, offering basketball lessons to individuals and groups. He helps young kids practice for their upcoming season. His basketball school is called Craig Austrie B-Ball IQ.
