= 2006 Big East men's basketball tournament =

- Classification: Division I
- Season: 2005–06
- Teams: 12
- Site: Madison Square Garden; New York City
- Champions: Syracuse (5th title)
- Winning coach: Jim Boeheim (5th title)
- MVP: Gerry McNamara (Syracuse)
- Top scorer: Gerry McNamara (Syracuse) (65 points)

2005–06 Big East men's basketball standings
	Conf.				Overall
Team	W		L	PCT	W		L	PCT
No. 2 Connecticut	14	–	2	.875	30	–	4	.882
No. 3 Villanova	14	–	2	.875	28	–	5	.848
No. 22 West Virginia	11	–	5	.688	22	–	11	.667
Marquette	10	–	6	.625	20	–	11	.645
No. 23 Georgetown	10	–	6	.625	23	–	10	.697
No. 16 Pittsburgh	10	–	6	.625	25	–	8	.758
Seton Hall	9	–	7	.563	18	–	12	.600
Cincinnati	8	–	8	.500	21	–	13	.618
Rutgers	7	–	9	.438	19	–	14	.576
Louisville	6	–	10	.375	21	–	13	.618
Notre Dame	6	–	10	.375	16	–	14	.533
DePaul*	5	–	11	.313	12	–	15	.444
Providence*	5	–	11	.313	12	–	15	.444
St. John's*	5	–	11	.313	12	–	15	.444
South Florida*	1	–	15	.063	7	–	22	.241
No. 21 Syracuse†#	0	–	9	.000	0	–	12	.000
† 2006 Big East tournament winner As of April 3, 2006; Rankings from AP Poll; *Did not qualify for 2006 Big East tournament. #Syracuse had all its wins vacated due to sanctions against the program; Syracuse′s disputed record was 23–12, 7–9.

The 2006 Big East Men's Basketball Championship was played from March 8 to March 11, 2006. The tournament took place at Madison Square Garden in New York City. It was a single-elimination tournament with four rounds. Villanova and Connecticut tied for the best regular season conference record. Based on tie-breakers, Connecticut was awarded the #1 seed.
The Syracuse Orange won the tournament for the second consecutive season and fifth time overall, and were awarded an automatic bid to the 2006 NCAA Men's Division I Basketball Tournament. As a 9-seed, the Orange are the lowest seeded team to win the Big East tournament, and became the first school to win four games in the tournament. Gerry McNamara of Syracuse was given the Dave Gavitt Trophy, awarded to the tournament's most outstanding player.

Due to NCAA sanctions for the use of ineligible players, all of Syracuse's wins from the 2005–06 season, including its four Big East tournament wins, later were vacated.

== Syracuse's Run ==
This tournament is best remembered for Syracuse's improbable run to the championship as a #9 seed, with McNamara pulling off excellent 3-point shooting and some improbable buzzer beaters and last-second shots to lead them. In the first game, after Devan Downey of Cincinnati stole the inbounds pass with ten seconds left and was fouled, he made one of two to put the Bearcats up two points. However, with just a half second left, McNamara made a running one-handed three-pointer to secure the victory, 74–73.

After jumping out to a big lead against Connecticut in the second game, UConn battled back for much of the game until they finally took their first lead of the game with 30 seconds to play. Incredibly, McNamara was the hero for Syracuse again, hitting a 30-foot three-pointer with 5 seconds left to send the game into overtime. The Orange went on to win 86–84, holding off the Huskies on a last-second effort. McNamara finished with thirteen assists, ten in the first half alone.

They faced Georgetown in the semifinals in their attempt to become the first team to win the Big East tournament as one of the teams forced to play on the first day, requiring four wins in a row. The Hoyas went up early, holding a fifteen-point lead at the half. McNamara sat out for ten minutes because of a nagging groin injury. Surprising everyone, McNamara came out in the second half and drained five three-pointers, including one with 45 seconds left and the Orange down four. Demetris Nichols knocked away the inbounds pass for Georgetown, allowing McNamara to take possession and rush down the floor with time running out. He passed to an open Eric Devendorf who laid the winning shot in with 1.5 seconds to go. The Orange had advanced to the finals, beating Georgetown, 58–57.

After improbably winning three straight games either in overtime or by one point, they got a slightly easier win in the finals against Pittsburgh, winning 65–61. The Orange led most of the game, but midway through the second half, the Panthers had taken the lead. McNamara quickly made a three-point shot after that and Josh Wright made four clutch free throws in the final minute to secure the historic championship. Syracuse had finished just 7–9 in the Big East that year, and would have likely been left out of the NCAA tournament had they not pulled off at least two of the four wins. They would go on to lose to Texas A&M in the first round of the tournament.

== Bracket ==
First round Wednesday, March 8
8	Cincinnati	73
9	Syracuse	74
5	#23 Georgetown	67
12	Notre Dame	63
7	Seton Hall	48
10	Rutgers	61
6	#15 Pittsburgh	61
11	Louisville	56

Quarterfinals; Thursday, March 9
1	#1 Connecticut	84
9	Syracuse	86*
4	Marquette	59
5	#23 Georgetown	62
2	#2 Villanova	87
10	Rutgers	55
3	#19 West Virginia	57
6	#15 Pittsburgh	68

Semifinals; Friday, March 10
9	Syracuse	58
5	#23 Georgetown	57
2	#2 Villanova	54
6	#15 Pittsburgh	68

Final; Saturday, March 11
9	Syracuse	65
6	#15 Pittsburgh	61

* – Overtime

Notes: By finishing below twelfth place during the regular season, DePaul, Providence, St. John's, and South Florida did not qualify for the tournament. The NCAA later vacated all of Syracuse's victories during the 2005–06 season, including its four tournament wins, because of the use of an ineligible player.

== Games ==
- 1st round: Wednesday, March 8

Noon

Team	1	2	Tot.
Syracuse (9 seed)	39	35	74
Cincinnati (8 seed)	34	39	73

2PM

Team	1	2	Tot.
Georgetown (5 seed)	27	40	67
Notre Dame (12 seed)	30	33	63

7PM

Team	1	2	Tot.
Seton Hall (7 seed)	19	29	48
Rutgers (10 seed)	23	38	61

9PM

Team	1	2	Tot.
Pittsburgh (6 seed)	39	22	61
Louisville (11 seed)	16	40	56

- Quarterfinals: Thursday, March 9

Noon

Team	1	2	OT	Tot.
Syracuse (9 seed)	39	35	12	86
Connecticut (1 seed)	28	46	10	84

2 PM

Team	1	2	Tot.
Georgetown (5 seed)	22	40	62
Marquette (4 seed)	22	37	59

7 PM

Team	1	2	Tot.
Villanova (2 seed)	34	53	87
Rutgers (10 seed)	33	22	55

9 PM

Team	1	2	Tot.
West Virginia (3 seed)	31	26	57
Pittsburgh (6 seed)	24	44	68

- Semifinals: Friday, March 10

7 PM

Team	1	2	Tot.
Syracuse (9 seed)	21	37	58
Georgetown (5 seed)	36	21	57

9 PM

Team	1	2	Tot.
Pittsburgh (6 seed)	32	36	68
Villanova (2 seed)	21	33	54

- Finals: Saturday, March 11

8 PM

Team	1	2	Tot.
Syracuse (9 seed)	34	31	65
Pittsburgh (6 seed)	25	36	61

== Awards ==
Dave Gavitt Trophy (Most Outstanding Player): Gerry McNamara, Syracuse

All-Tournament Team

- Aaron Gray, Pittsburgh
- Carl Krauser, Pittsburgh
- Demetris Nichols, Syracuse
- Darryl Watkins, Syracuse
- Randy Foye, Villanova
