= 2005–06 Pittsburgh Panthers men's basketball team =

American college basketball season

2005–06 Pittsburgh Panthers men's basketball

NCAA tournament, second round
- Conference: Big East Conference (1979–2013)

Ranking
- Coaches: No. 18
- AP: No. 16
- Record: 25–8 (10–6 Big East)
- Head coach: Jamie Dixon (3rd season)
- Assistant coaches: Barry Rohrssen (5th season); Joe Lombardi (3rd season); Pat Sandle (5th season)
- Home arena: Petersen Events Center (Capacity: 12,508)

2005–06 Big East men's basketball standings
| | Conf. | | | | Overall |
| Team | W | | L | PCT | W | | L | PCT |
|---|---|---|---|---|---|---|---|---|
| No. 2 Connecticut | 14 | – | 2 | .875 | 30 | – | 4 | .882 |
| No. 3 Villanova | 14 | – | 2 | .875 | 28 | – | 5 | .848 |
| No. 22 West Virginia | 11 | – | 5 | .688 | 22 | – | 11 | .667 |
| Marquette | 10 | – | 6 | .625 | 20 | – | 11 | .645 |
| No. 23 Georgetown | 10 | – | 6 | .625 | 23 | – | 10 | .697 |
| No. 16 Pittsburgh | 10 | – | 6 | .625 | 25 | – | 8 | .758 |
| Seton Hall | 9 | – | 7 | .563 | 18 | – | 12 | .600 |
| Cincinnati | 8 | – | 8 | .500 | 21 | – | 13 | .618 |
| Rutgers | 7 | – | 9 | .438 | 19 | – | 14 | .576 |
| Louisville | 6 | – | 10 | .375 | 21 | – | 13 | .618 |
| Notre Dame | 6 | – | 10 | .375 | 16 | – | 14 | .533 |
| DePaul* | 5 | – | 11 | .313 | 12 | – | 15 | .444 |
| Providence* | 5 | – | 11 | .313 | 12 | – | 15 | .444 |
| St. John's* | 5 | – | 11 | .313 | 12 | – | 15 | .444 |
| South Florida* | 1 | – | 15 | .063 | 7 | – | 22 | .241 |
| No. 21 Syracuse†# | 0 | – | 9 | .000 | 0 | – | 12 | .000 |
† 2006 Big East tournament winner As of April 3, 2006; Rankings from AP Poll; *Did not qualify for 2006 Big East tournament. #Syracuse had all its wins vacated due to sanctions against the program; Syracuse′s disputed record was 23–12, 7–9.

The 2005–06 Pittsburgh Panthers men's basketball team represented the University of Pittsburgh in the 2005–06 NCAA Division I men's basketball season. Led by head coach Jamie Dixon, the Panthers finished with a record of 25–8 and made it to the second round of the 2006 NCAA Division I men's basketball tournament.
