= 2005–06 Syracuse Orange men's basketball team =

American college basketball season

2005–06 Syracuse Orange men's basketball

Big East Tournament Champions (vacated)

NCAA tournament, First round
- Conference: Big East Conference

Ranking
- AP: No. 21
- Record: 0–12, 23 wins vacated (0–9 Big East, 7 wins vacated)
- Head coach: Jim Boeheim
- Assistant coaches: Bernie Fine; Mike Hopkins; Rob Murphy
- Home arena: Carrier Dome

2005–06 Big East men's basketball standings
	Conf.				Overall
Team	W		L	PCT	W		L	PCT
No. 2 Connecticut	14	–	2	.875	30	–	4	.882
No. 3 Villanova	14	–	2	.875	28	–	5	.848
No. 22 West Virginia	11	–	5	.688	22	–	11	.667
Marquette	10	–	6	.625	20	–	11	.645
No. 23 Georgetown	10	–	6	.625	23	–	10	.697
No. 16 Pittsburgh	10	–	6	.625	25	–	8	.758
Seton Hall	9	–	7	.563	18	–	12	.600
Cincinnati	8	–	8	.500	21	–	13	.618
Rutgers	7	–	9	.438	19	–	14	.576
Louisville	6	–	10	.375	21	–	13	.618
Notre Dame	6	–	10	.375	16	–	14	.533
DePaul*	5	–	11	.313	12	–	15	.444
Providence*	5	–	11	.313	12	–	15	.444
St. John's*	5	–	11	.313	12	–	15	.444
South Florida*	1	–	15	.063	7	–	22	.241
No. 21 Syracuse†#	0	–	9	.000	0	–	12	.000
† 2006 Big East tournament winner As of April 3, 2006; Rankings from AP Poll; *Did not qualify for 2006 Big East tournament. #Syracuse had all its wins vacated due to sanctions against the program; Syracuse′s disputed record was 23–12, 7–9.

The 2005–06 Syracuse Orange men's basketball team represented Syracuse University. The head coach was Jim Boeheim, serving for his 30th year. The team played its home games at the Carrier Dome in Syracuse, New York. The team finished with a 23–12 (7–9) record, while being eliminated in the first round of the NCAA Tournament.

The team was led by Gerry McNamara, the team's lone senior. Also seeing time in the starting lineup were juniors Darryl Watkins, Louie McCroskey, Demetris Nichols and Terrence Roberts, and freshman Eric Devendorf.

Due to NCAA sanctions for use of ineligible players, all wins from this season have been vacated.

== Season recap ==
Syracuse started off the season losing Josh Pace, Hakim Warrick and Craig Forth to graduation, leaving McNamara as the only consistent returning starter from the 2004–05 team. After starting the season 15–2, Syracuse struggled, losing four in a row to Connecticut, Villanova, Pittsburgh and Seton Hall. The Orange would go 4–5 the rest of the way, including an emotional 92–82 loss to Villanova at the Carrier Dome, despite 29 points from McNamara in his final home game.

After McNamara's home send-off, Syracuse then captured the most unlikely of its Big East Tournament Championships, fueled by the heroics of Gerry McNamara. Prior to the conference tournament two separate publications, Sports Illustrated and the Syracuse Post-Standard conducted polls of Big East players and assistant coaches. In each poll, McNamara was voted the Big East's "Most Overrated" player.

In the first round he hit a running one-handed three-point shot with less than a second left in the game to spur Syracuse past the University of Cincinnati, 74–73. Following the game Jim Boeheim unleashed a passionate defense of his star player to the attending media.

The next day McNamara hit a three-pointer in the closing seconds of regulation to tie number-one ranked Connecticut and eventually led Syracuse to an overtime 86–84 upset. McNamara finished with 17 points and 13 assists, one assist shy of the Big East Tournament record.

Syracuse fell behind Georgetown University in the tournament's semi-finals, Syracuse's third game in three days. McNamara hit five three-pointers in the second half—including one in the last minute of the game—to slash the Hoyas' lead to one. He dished out an assist to freshman guard Eric Devendorf to put Syracuse in the lead following a Georgetown turnover and forced another turnover in the closing seconds to clinch the game, 58–57.

McNamara had 14 points and 6 assists in Syracuse's 65–61 championship game win over the University of Pittsburgh. Syracuse became the first team to win four games in four days and capture the Big East Tournament Championship.

However, the thrill of Syracuse's unlikely run to the Big East Championship was dampened by a first round of the 2006 NCAA Tournament. Severely hobbled by his leg injury and exhausted from the run in the Big East tournament, McNamara was only able to score two points in just 23 minutes of play as fifth-seeded Syracuse was upset by 12th-seeded Texas A&M University, 66–58.

== Roster ==
- Gerry McNamara (16.0 pts, 5.9 ast, 2.7 reb)
- Demetris Nichols (13.3 pts, 1.4 ast, 5.8 reb)
- Eric Devendorf (12.2 pts, 2.3 ast, 2.5 reb)
- Terrence Roberts (10.7 pts, 1.6 ast, 7.6 reb)
- Darryl Watkins (7.1 pts, 0.7 ast, 7.3 reb)
- Louie McCroskey (3.8 pts, 1.3 ast, 3.3 reb)
- Josh Wright (4.3 pts, 1.6 ast, 1.4 reb)
- Matt Gorman (2.6 pts, 0.3 ast, 2.1 reb)
- Arinze Onuaku (2.0 pts, 0.1 ast, 2.8 reb)
- Andy Rautins (2.9 pts, 0.7 ast, 0.9 reb)
