= 2005–06 Louisville Cardinals men's basketball team =

American college basketball season

2005–06 Louisville Cardinals men's basketball

Orange Bowl Basketball Classic champion

NIT, Semifinals
- Conference: Big East Conference (1979–2013)
- Record: 21–13 (6–10 Big East)
- Head coach: Rick Pitino (5th season)
- Home arena: Freedom Hall

2005–06 Big East men's basketball standings
	Conf.				Overall
Team	W		L	PCT	W		L	PCT
No. 2 Connecticut	14	–	2	.875	30	–	4	.882
No. 3 Villanova	14	–	2	.875	28	–	5	.848
No. 22 West Virginia	11	–	5	.688	22	–	11	.667
Marquette	10	–	6	.625	20	–	11	.645
No. 23 Georgetown	10	–	6	.625	23	–	10	.697
No. 16 Pittsburgh	10	–	6	.625	25	–	8	.758
Seton Hall	9	–	7	.563	18	–	12	.600
Cincinnati	8	–	8	.500	21	–	13	.618
Rutgers	7	–	9	.438	19	–	14	.576
Louisville	6	–	10	.375	21	–	13	.618
Notre Dame	6	–	10	.375	16	–	14	.533
DePaul*	5	–	11	.313	12	–	15	.444
Providence*	5	–	11	.313	12	–	15	.444
St. John's*	5	–	11	.313	12	–	15	.444
South Florida*	1	–	15	.063	7	–	22	.241
No. 21 Syracuse†#	0	–	9	.000	0	–	12	.000
† 2006 Big East tournament winner As of April 3, 2006; Rankings from AP Poll; *Did not qualify for 2006 Big East tournament. #Syracuse had all its wins vacated due to sanctions against the program; Syracuse′s disputed record was 23–12, 7–9.

The 2005–06 Louisville Cardinals men's basketball team represented the University of Louisville in the 2005–06 NCAA Division I men's basketball season. The head coach of the Cardinals was Rick Pitino.

Louisville defeated Miami 58–43 in the Orange Bowl Basketball Classic on December 31, 2005, improving to 11–1 on the season.

The Cardinals finished with a 21–13 record. They were eliminated from the ACC tournament in the first round by Pittsburgh 61–56 on March 8, 2006. Their season ended after a 78–63 loss to South Carolina in the 2006 NIT semifinals on March 28, 2006.
