= 2005–06 Seton Hall Pirates men's basketball team =

American college basketball season

2005–06 Seton Hall Pirates men's basketball

NCAA tournament, First round
- Conference: Big East Conference
- Record: 18–12 (9–7 Big East)
- Head coach: Louis Orr (5th season)
- Home arena: Continental Airlines Arena

2005–06 Big East men's basketball standings
	Conf.				Overall
Team	W		L	PCT	W		L	PCT
No. 2 Connecticut	14	–	2	.875	30	–	4	.882
No. 3 Villanova	14	–	2	.875	28	–	5	.848
No. 22 West Virginia	11	–	5	.688	22	–	11	.667
Marquette	10	–	6	.625	20	–	11	.645
No. 23 Georgetown	10	–	6	.625	23	–	10	.697
No. 16 Pittsburgh	10	–	6	.625	25	–	8	.758
Seton Hall	9	–	7	.563	18	–	12	.600
Cincinnati	8	–	8	.500	21	–	13	.618
Rutgers	7	–	9	.438	19	–	14	.576
Louisville	6	–	10	.375	21	–	13	.618
Notre Dame	6	–	10	.375	16	–	14	.533
DePaul*	5	–	11	.313	12	–	15	.444
Providence*	5	–	11	.313	12	–	15	.444
St. John's*	5	–	11	.313	12	–	15	.444
South Florida*	1	–	15	.063	7	–	22	.241
No. 21 Syracuse†#	0	–	9	.000	0	–	12	.000
† 2006 Big East tournament winner As of April 3, 2006; Rankings from AP Poll; *Did not qualify for 2006 Big East tournament. #Syracuse had all its wins vacated due to sanctions against the program; Syracuse′s disputed record was 23–12, 7–9.

The 2005–06 Seton Hall Pirates men's basketball team represented Seton Hall University as a member of the Big East Conference during the 2005–06 NCAA men's college basketball season. The team was led by head coach Louis Orr and played their home games at Continental Airlines Arena in East Rutherford, New Jersey.

== Roster ==
2005–06 Seton Hall Pirates men's basketball team
Players	Coaches
Pos. / # / Name / Height / Weight / Year / Previous school / Hometown; C / 50 / Marcus Cousin / 6 ft 11 in (2.11 m) / 250 lb (113 kg) / So / Randallstown / Baltimore, Maryland	Head coach: Louis Orr; Assistant coach(es) Legend: (C) Team captain; (S) Suspended; (I) Ineligible; (W) Walk-on; Injured; Current redshirt; Roster

== Schedule and results ==
Date time, TV	Rank^{#}	Opponent^{#}	Result	Record	Site city, state
Regular Season
Nov 14, 2005*		Manhattan; NIT Season Tip-Off	W 66–52	1–0	Continental Airlines Arena; East Rutherford, New Jersey
Nov 16, 2005*		at No. 1 Duke; NIT Season Tip-Off	L 40–93	1–1	Cameron Indoor Stadium; Durham, North Carolina
Mar 3, 2006		at No. 8 Pittsburgh	W 65–61	18–10 (9–7)	Petersen Events Center; Pittsburgh, Pennsylvania
Big East Tournament
Mar 8, 2006*		vs. Rutgers; First Round	L 48–61	18–11	Madison Square Garden; New York, New York
NCAA Tournament
Mar 16, 2006*	(10 E)	vs. (7 E) Wichita State; First Round	L 66–86	18–12	Greensboro Coliseum; Greensboro, North Carolina
*Non-conference game. ^{#}Rankings from AP Poll. (#) Tournament seedings in parentheses. E=East.
