= 2005–06 St. John's Red Storm men's basketball team =

American college basketball season

2005–06 St. John's Red Storm men's basketball

MSG Holiday Festival Champions
- Conference: Big East Conference (1979–2013)
- Record: 12–15 (5–11 Big East)
- Head coach: Norm Roberts (2nd year)
- Assistant coaches: Glenn Braica; Chuck Martin; Fred Quartlebaum
- Home arena: Carnesecca Arena; Madison Square Garden

2005–06 Big East men's basketball standings
	Conf.				Overall
Team	W		L	PCT	W		L	PCT
No. 2 Connecticut	14	–	2	.875	30	–	4	.882
No. 3 Villanova	14	–	2	.875	28	–	5	.848
No. 22 West Virginia	11	–	5	.688	22	–	11	.667
Marquette	10	–	6	.625	20	–	11	.645
No. 23 Georgetown	10	–	6	.625	23	–	10	.697
No. 16 Pittsburgh	10	–	6	.625	25	–	8	.758
Seton Hall	9	–	7	.563	18	–	12	.600
Cincinnati	8	–	8	.500	21	–	13	.618
Rutgers	7	–	9	.438	19	–	14	.576
Louisville	6	–	10	.375	21	–	13	.618
Notre Dame	6	–	10	.375	16	–	14	.533
DePaul*	5	–	11	.313	12	–	15	.444
Providence*	5	–	11	.313	12	–	15	.444
St. John's*	5	–	11	.313	12	–	15	.444
South Florida*	1	–	15	.063	7	–	22	.241
No. 21 Syracuse†#	0	–	9	.000	0	–	12	.000
† 2006 Big East tournament winner As of April 3, 2006; Rankings from AP Poll; *Did not qualify for 2006 Big East tournament. #Syracuse had all its wins vacated due to sanctions against the program; Syracuse′s disputed record was 23–12, 7–9.

The 2005–06 St. John's Red Storm men's basketball team represented St. John's University during the 2005–06 NCAA Division I men's basketball season. The Red Storm, led by head coach Norm Roberts in his second year at the school, played their home games at Carnesecca Arena and Madison Square Garden as members of the Big East Conference.

== Off season ==
=== Departures ===
Name	Number	Pos.	Height	Weight	Year	Hometown	Notes
Tyler Jones	1	PF	6'9"	210	Sophomore	Denver, Colorado	Transferred
Rodney Epperson	2	PF	6'7"	200	Junior	Flushing, New York	Transferred to Mountain State
Mohamed Diakite	44	C	6'11"	210	RS Senior	Rockville, Maryland	Graduated

=== Class of 2005 signees ===
College recruiting information
Name	Hometown	School	Height	Weight	Commit date
Anthony Mason, Jr. SF	Memphis, TN	Fairley High School	6 ft 7 in (2.01 m)	213 lb (97 kg)	Oct 3, 2004
Anthony Mason, Jr. SF	Recruit ratings: Scout: Rivals: 247Sports:				
Ricky Torres; SG	Bronx, NY	St. Raymond High School	6 ft 4 in (1.93 m)	200 lb (91 kg)	Sep 16, 2004
Ricky Torres; SG	Recruit ratings: Scout: Rivals: 247Sports:				
Tomas Jasiulionis; C	Utena, Lithuania	Trinity Episcopal School	6 ft 11 in (2.11 m)	249 lb (113 kg)	Nov 5, 2004
Tomas Jasiulionis; C	Recruit ratings: Scout: 247Sports:				
Overall recruit ranking:
Note: In many cases, Scout, Rivals, 247Sports, On3, and ESPN may conflict in their listings of height and weight.; In these cases, the average was taken. ESPN grades are on a 100-point scale.; Sources: "2005 Team Ranking". Rivals.

=== Transfer additions ===
Name	Pos.	Height	Weight	Year	Hometown	Notes
Aaron Spears	F	6'9"	250	Junior	Chicago, Illinois	junior college transfer from Highland Community College (2 yrs immediate eligibility)

== Roster ==
2005–06 St. John's Red Storm men's basketball team
Players
Coaches

Pos.	#	Name	Height	Weight	Year	Previous school	Hometown
G	0	Nygel Roach (W)	6 ft 3 in (1.91 m)	195 lb (88 kg)	Sr	Xavier	North Bergen, NJ
G	1	Jermaine Maybank	6 ft 4 in (1.93 m)	180 lb (82 kg)	RS Jr	Independence C.C.	Bronx, NY
G	3	Daryll Hill (C)	6 ft 3 in (1.91 m)	170 lb (77 kg)	RS Jr	Milford Academy	Bayside, NY
G	4	Eugene Lawrence	6 ft 1 in (1.85 m)	210 lb (95 kg)	So	Abraham Lincoln	Brooklyn, NY
G	5	Devin Mayo (W)	6 ft 0 in (1.83 m)	158 lb (72 kg)	Jr	Clinton Christian	Upper Marlboro, MD
C	10	Tomas Jasiulionis	6 ft 11 in (2.11 m)	249 lb (113 kg)	Fr	Trinity Episcopal	Utena, Lithuania
G	11	Cedric Jackson	6 ft 1 in (1.85 m)	180 lb (82 kg)	So	Northern Burlington	McGuire, NJ
F	15	Phil Missere	6 ft 9 in (2.06 m)	206 lb (93 kg)	Sr	Cornwall Central	Cornwall, NY
F	20	Anthony Mason Jr.	6 ft 7 in (2.01 m)	213 lb (97 kg)	Fr	Failey	Memphis, TN
G	22	Ricky Torres	6 ft 4 in (1.93 m)	200 lb (91 kg)	Fr	St. Raymond's	New York, NY
F	23	Ryan Williams	6 ft 5 in (1.96 m)	225 lb (102 kg)	Sr	Cardozo/Monroe	Queens, NY
F	24	Dexter Gray	6 ft 6 in (1.98 m)	220 lb (100 kg)	So	Mount Vernon	Mount Vernon, NY
G	30	Liam Biesty (W)	6 ft 0 in (1.83 m)	185 lb (84 kg)	So	Poly Prep	Brooklyn, NY
F/C	34	Lamont Hamilton (C)	6 ft 10 in (2.08 m)	225 lb (102 kg)	Jr	Bridgton Academy	Brooklyn, NY
F	33	Otoja Abit (W)	6 ft 6 in (1.98 m)	195 lb (88 kg)	So	Archbishop Molloy	Woodside, NY
F	40	Aaron Spears	6 ft 9 in (2.06 m)	250 lb (113 kg)	Jr	Dunbar/Illinois/Highland	Chicago, IL

Head coach

- Norm Roberts (Queens College)

Assistant coach(es)

- Glenn Braica
- Chuck Martin
- Fred Quartlebaum

Legend

- (C) Team captain
- (S) Suspended
- (I) Ineligible
- (W) Walk-on
- Injured
- Current redshirt

== Schedule and results ==
Date time, TV	Rank^{#}	Opponent^{#}	Result	Record	Site (attendance) city, state
Exhibition
11/14/05*; 7:30pm		Queens College	W 102–62		Carnesecca Arena (N/A); Queens, NY
Non-conference regular season
11/19/05*; 7:30pm		Maryland-Eastern Shore	W 77–40	1–0	Carnesecca Arena (N/A); Queens, NY
11/22/05*; 7:30pm		St. Francis (NY)	W 64–50	2–0	Carnesecca Arena (N/A); Queens, NY
11/26/05*; 3:00pm		Niagara	W 67–61	3–0	Carnesecca Arena (3,821); Queens, NY
11/29/05*; 7:30pm		Hofstra	L 51–64	3–1	Carnesecca Arena (N/A); Queens, NY
12/03/05*; 7:30pm		Charleston Southern	W 64–50	4–1	Carnesecca Arena (3,663); Queens, NY
12/07/05*; 7:30pm		Stony Brook	W 63–45	5–1	Carnesecca Arena (N/A); Queens, NY
12/10/05*; 4:00 pm, FSN		at Virginia Tech	L 64–73	5–2	Cassell Coliseum (9,847); Blacksburg, VA
12/17/05*; 2:00pm		Marist	L 53–56	5–3	Madison Square Garden (N/A); New York, NY
12/21/05*; 6:00pm, ESPN2		at No. 1 Duke	L 57–70	5–4	Cameron Indoor Stadium (9,314); Durham, NC
12/27/05*; 8:30pm, MSG		Columbia; Panasonic Holiday Festival Opening Round	W 63–39	6–4	Madison Square Garden (7,617); New York, NY
12/28/05*; 8:30pm, MSG		UMass; Panasonic Holiday Festival Championship	W 51–49	7–4	Madison Square Garden (7,408); New York, NY
Big East Conference Regular Season
01/04/06; 7:00pm, MSG		at Seton Hall	L 61–69 ^{OT}	7–5 (0–1)	Izod Center (6,092); East Rutherford, NJ
01/08/06; 7:00pm, MSG		Georgetown	L 65–79	7–6 (0–2)	Madison Square Garden (N/A); New York, NY
01/14/06; 7:00pm, MSG		at South Florida	W 68–49	8–6 (1–2)	Sun Dome (4,456); Tampa, FL
01/17/06; 9:00pm, ESPN2		No. 17 Louisville	W 68–56	9–6 (2–2)	Madison Square Garden (5,224); New York, NY
01/21/06; 12:00pm, MSG		No. 9 Pittsburgh	W 55–50	10–6 (3–2)	Madison Square Garden (6,942); New York, NY
01/25/06; 7:30pm, FSNY		at No. 1 Connecticut	L 50–66	10–7 (3–3)	Hartford Civic Center (10,167); Storrs, CT
01/29/06; 2:30pm, MSG		West Virginia	L 61–66	10–8 (3–4)	Madison Square Garden (7,236); New York, NY
02/01/06; 8:00pm		at Marquette	L 61–81	10–9 (3–5)	BMO Harris Bradley Center (14,105); Milwaukee, WI
02/04/06; 7:30pm		at Providence	L 73–81	10–10 (3–6)	Dunkin Donuts Center (11,952); Providence, RI
02/09/06; 9:00pm, ESPN2		at No. 15 Georgetown	L 41–64	10–11 (3–7)	Verizon Center (9,739); Washington, D.C.
02/12/06; 2:00pm, MSG		Syracuse	L 60–75	10–12 (3–8)	Madison Square Garden (11,473); New York, NY
02/15/06; 7:30pm, FSNY		at Rutgers	W 54–51	11–12 (4–8)	Louis Brown Athletic Center (6,864); Piscataway, NJ
02/18/06; 12:00pm, MSG		DePaul	L 48–52	11–13 (4–9)	Madison Square Garden (6,233); New York, NY
02/21/06; 7:00pm, MSG		Seton Hall	W 58–47	12–13 (5–9)	Madison Square Garden (6,719); New York, NY
03/01/06; 7:30pm, N/A		at No. 4 Villanova	L 52–62	12–14 (5–10)	The Pavilion (6,500); Villanova, PA
03/05/06; 2:00pm, MSG		Rutgers	L 70–82	12–15 (5–11)	Carnesecca Arena (6,008); Queens, NY
*Non-conference game. ^{#}Rankings from AP Poll. (#) Tournament seedings in parentheses.
