= Eric Hicks (basketball) =

American basketball player (born 1983)

Profile
- Position: Power forward/Center

Personal information
- Born: November 27, 1983 (age 42); Greensboro, North Carolina
- Listed height: 6 ft 6 in (1.98 m)
- Listed weight: 250 lb (113 kg)

Career information
- College: Cincinnati
- NFL draft: 2010: undrafted

Career history
- Cincinnati Commandos (2012)

Medal record

Men's basketball

Representing the United States

Summer Universiade
Gold medal – first place	2005 Izmir	Team competition

Eric Hicks (born November 27, 1983, in Greensboro, North Carolina) is an American professional basketball player. Since graduating from the University of Cincinnati, he has played professionally for Telindus BC Oostende (Belgium), Polpak Swiecie (Poland), and CSK VVS Samara (Russia). He has also had two stints in the NBA Summer League with the Miami Heat and Boston Celtics, but has not played a regular season game in the NBA. Among the highlights of his European career are a 2007 Belgian league championship and an appearance in the 2008 Polish league All-Star Game. Now he plays for Leite Río Breogán from Liga LEB.

== Football career ==
=== Cincinnati Commandos ===
In 2012, Hicks was granted his chance to play football for the first time since he was a sophomore in high school. He suited up for the Cincinnati Commandos of the United Indoor Football League as a wide receiver.
