= 2005–06 Georgetown Hoyas men's basketball team =

American college basketball season

2005–06 Georgetown Hoyas men's basketball

Sun Bowl Classic Champions

NCAA tournament, Sweet Sixteen
- Conference: Big East

Ranking
- Coaches: No. 16
- AP: No. 23
- Record: 23–10 (10–6 Big East)
- Head coach: John Thompson III (2nd season)
- Assistant coaches: Robert Burke (2nd season); Kevin Broadus (2nd season); Sydney Johnson (2nd season)
- Captains: Ashanti Cook; Darrel Owens
- Home arena: MCI Center

2005–06 Big East men's basketball standings
| | Conf. | | | | Overall |
| Team | W | | L | PCT | W | | L | PCT |
|---|---|---|---|---|---|---|---|---|
| No. 2 Connecticut | 14 | – | 2 | .875 | 30 | – | 4 | .882 |
| No. 3 Villanova | 14 | – | 2 | .875 | 28 | – | 5 | .848 |
| No. 22 West Virginia | 11 | – | 5 | .688 | 22 | – | 11 | .667 |
| Marquette | 10 | – | 6 | .625 | 20 | – | 11 | .645 |
| No. 23 Georgetown | 10 | – | 6 | .625 | 23 | – | 10 | .697 |
| No. 16 Pittsburgh | 10 | – | 6 | .625 | 25 | – | 8 | .758 |
| Seton Hall | 9 | – | 7 | .563 | 18 | – | 12 | .600 |
| Cincinnati | 8 | – | 8 | .500 | 21 | – | 13 | .618 |
| Rutgers | 7 | – | 9 | .438 | 19 | – | 14 | .576 |
| Louisville | 6 | – | 10 | .375 | 21 | – | 13 | .618 |
| Notre Dame | 6 | – | 10 | .375 | 16 | – | 14 | .533 |
| DePaul* | 5 | – | 11 | .313 | 12 | – | 15 | .444 |
| Providence* | 5 | – | 11 | .313 | 12 | – | 15 | .444 |
| St. John's* | 5 | – | 11 | .313 | 12 | – | 15 | .444 |
| South Florida* | 1 | – | 15 | .063 | 7 | – | 22 | .241 |
| No. 21 Syracuse†# | 0 | – | 9 | .000 | 0 | – | 12 | .000 |
† 2006 Big East tournament winner As of April 3, 2006; Rankings from AP Poll; *Did not qualify for 2006 Big East tournament. #Syracuse had all its wins vacated due to sanctions against the program; Syracuse′s disputed record was 23–12, 7–9.

The 2005–06 Georgetown Hoyas men's basketball team was an NCAA Division I college basketball team competing in the Big East Conference, representing Georgetown University. The team raced out to an 11–4 record including an 8–2 mark in out of conference play. John Thompson III's first notable win with the team took place on January 21, 2006, in the 16th game of the season when unranked Georgetown upset No. 1 Duke University. This was Georgetown's first win over a No. 1 ranked team in 21 years. The team received an at-large bid to the NCAA tournament and advanced to the Minneapolis Region Semifinal in the "Sweet Sixteen", where it came the closest of any team to beating the eventual national champion, Florida.

The team was ranked No. 23 in final Associated Press Poll of the season and No. 16 in the postseason Coaches' Poll.

== Season recap ==
=== Regular season ===
Sophomore forward Jeff Green led the team in scoring, shooting 44.5 percent from the field and averaging 11.9 points per game, was second in rebounding, with 6.5 per game, and led the team in assists, with 3.27 per game. At Vanderbilt, he scored 14 points and had season highs with nine rebounds and four blocked shots. At 11th-ranked Illinois, he got off to a slow start with only one point in the first half, but then put in a 20-point performance in the second half for a season-high 21 points. He led the team in scoring at 16th-ranked West Virginia with 17 points, also tying his season high with nine rebounds during the game. He scored 13 points and had eight rebounds at fourth-ranked Connecticut, and in an upset of top-ranked Duke he scored 18 points, tied his career high with seven assists, and had three steals. In a double-overtime win at Notre Dame, he played a career-high 46 minutes, during which he scored 12 points and had seven rebounds and six assists. He had a 20-point, seven-rebound, five-assist performance against Cincinnati and scored 15 points and had seven rebounds at DePaul. In a game with Pittsburgh at the MCI Center, he shot 9-got-14 (64.3%) from the field and tied his career high with 22 points. In a rematch with now ninth-ranked West Virginia at the MCI Center, he had his first double-double of the season, scoring 21 points and collecting 10 rebounds, and at fourth-ranked Villanova he scored 15 points, grabbed six rebounds, and had a game-high six assists. He shot a season-high 8-for-12 (66.7%) from the free-throw and led the team in scoring with 18 points in the victory over Syracuse, also collecting seven rebounds and making four assists. He ended the regular season with 10 points at South Florida.

Sophomore center Roy Hibbert was second on the team in scoring, shooting 59.0 percent from the field and averaging 11.6 points per game, and he led the team in rebounds with 6.9 per game and in blocked shots with 54 blocks, an average of 1.64 per game. He opened the season with a team-leading 20-point performance against Navy in a game in which he also grabbed seven rebounds and blocked four shots. Three days later, he followed up with a 23-point game against James Madison. In an early-season win at Oregon, he shot 6-for-6 from the free-throw line and scored 16 points. Against Stetson two weeks later, he saw a 25-for-25 free-throw shooting streak end, but he also had his second double-double of the season with 17 points and 10 rebounds. He had a double-double again in his next game, with 16 points and 11 rebounds against Savannah State. As the Big East season started at the beginning of 2006, he had his fourth double-double, scoring 16 points and pulling down 10 rebounds against Providence. He scored 16 points again six days later at 16th-ranked West Virginia, and followed that up with 12 points at fourth-ranked Connecticut, shooting 6-for-9 (66.7%) from the field against the Huskies. He had his fifth double-double in the double-overtime win against Notre Dame, scoring 18 points and grabbing 13 rebounds, and in a win over Cincinnati he scored eight points and had seven rebounds. At DePaul, he shot 7-for-9 (77.8%) from the field, scored 17 points and led the team with eight rebounds, and in a win over St. John's he put in a 14-point, eight-rebound performance. In the rematch with ninth-ranked West Virginia at the MCI Center, Hibbert had a season-high four assists. He led the team with 17 points and grabbed eight rebounds at Marquette, had his sixth double-double of the season with 20 points and 12 rebounds at fourth-ranked Villanova, and in a win over Rutgers shot 10-for-13 (76.9%) from the field, scored a career-high 25 points, and had eight rebounds.

Sophomore guard Jonathan Wallace shot 45.7 percent from the field and 42.7 percent from three-point range, scored in double digits 14 times, averaged 8.4 points per game, and led the team in assists with 3.23 per game. His first double-digit scoring performance of the year was against James Madison, when he scored 12 points, and he scored 11 points against Vanderbilt. Against Fairfield he also scored 11 points, and he tied what was then a career-high with six assists. He scored 10 points and had three assists against Savannah State, and against a tough Miners team at Texas-El Paso in the championship game of the Sun Bowl Classic he scored 13 points, with four rebounds and four assists. He scored a season-high 15 points in the Big East season opener against Providence, and six days later at 16th-ranked West Virginia he scored 12 points, pulled down a season-high five rebounds, and had four assists. In the upset of No. 1 Duke, he scored 12 points and again tied his personal record of six assists. He scored 10 points against Cincinnati, and against Rutgers he again tied his career high with six assists, pulled down a career-best six rebounds, and again scored 10 points. He also scored 10 points both against Syracuse and at South Florida.

Senior forward Brandon Bowman started all 33 games – competing his string of starting all 127 games of his collegiate career. He shot 44.9 percent from the field for the year and 52.6 percent from two-point range, but only 28.6 percent from beyond the three-point arc. In the first four Big East games of the season, he averaged 15 points per game, but then began to exhibit the inconsistency that had plagued him through his tenure at Georgetown, shooting only 2-for-6 (33.3%) from the field against South Florida in the fifth conference game. He had perhaps the best game of his career in the upset of Duke, playing excellent defense, shooting 8-for-12 (66.7%) from the field, scoring 23 points, grabbing seven rebounds, and blocking three shots. He scored five of the Hoyas' last six points to put the Hoyas over the top and secure the upset, and he hit two crucial free throws with 29 seconds left to play that forced Duke to attempt three-pointers for the remainder of the game. Unfortunately, in the Hoyas' next game, against Notre Dame, Bowman fouled senior Notre Dame guard Chris Quinn with Georgetown leading by four points as Quinn shot and made a three-pointer; Quinn made the resulting free-throw to complete a four-point play that tied the game and forced overtime, and the Hoyas had to play a second overtime before eking out an 85–82 win. Bowman faltered over the remainder of the regular season, although he did have a double-double against ninth-ranked West Virginia with 15 points and 11 rebounds.

Senior guard and team co-captain Ashanti Cook started all 33 games, the third straight season he had started every game. Early in the season in the win at Oregon, he shot 8-for-10 (80.0%) from the field, mostly from long range, and scored a career-high 25 points. In Georgetown's upset of No. 1-ranked Duke, he scored 17 points before a leg cramp forced him to leave the game, and three days later he scored 15 at Notre Dame. After a 4-for-24 (16.7%) shooting slump during the middle of the season, he regained his form; in his last seven games, he shot 58 percent from the field, 52 percent in three-point shots, and 78 percent in free throws, and he averaged only two turnovers per game.

Forward and team co-captain Darrel Owens had sat out his freshman year in 2001–02 and opted to use his remaining year of collegiate eligibility by returning for a fifth year at Georgetown this season. No longer a starter, he appeared in all 32 games this season as a reserve in a key "sixth man" role. At Texas-El Paso, he shot 5-for-5 from three-point range and scored 21 points as Georgetown beat the Miners on their home court to win the Sun Bowl Classic. Eleven days later at Madison Square Garden, he scored 24 points against St. John's, then continued his hot shooting with 20 points against South Florida at the MCI Center. In the upset of Duke four days later, he missed his first shot but then went 6-for-7 (85.7%) from the field. Four days after that, he had an 18-point performance at Notre Dame. His offensive numbers declined for much of the rest of the season, but would improve in the postseason.

Freshman guard Jessie Sapp joined the team this season and appeared in all 33 games, averaging 16.0 minutes per game. He scored a season-high 11 points against Savannah State, and in Big East play had a season high of eight points against Rutgers.

The Hoyas won the Sun Bowl Classic in late December 2005 and started the season 10–2, with one of their losses coming on the road against No. 11 Illinois. After two losses to ranked Big East opponents (No. 16 West Virginia and No. 4 Connecticut), they ran off seven straight wins – including upsets of No. 1 Duke and No. 9 Pittsburgh – to push their record to 17–4, and in late January 2006 Georgetown climbed into the national rankings for the first time since early January 2002, remaining a ranked team through the end of the season. The Hoyas faltered down the stretch, losing four of their last six regular-season games, but two of the losses came to ranked opponents (No. 9 West Virginia and No. 4 Villanova). They finished the regular season tied for third place in the Big East, with a 10–6 record in the conference and 19-8 overall.

An unusual footnote to the season occurred on February 25, 2006, when a candidate for student government at The George Washington University led a group of George Washington students estimated at between six and 15 people on a walk from George Washington's main campus in Washington, D.C.'s Foggy Bottom neighborhood to the Georgetown campus 1.4 miles (2.3 km) away to protest Georgetown's refusal to schedule the Colonials for a regular-season game since December 1981 and to demand a game between the schools. The George Washington students arrived at Georgetown to find the campus virtually deserted because of the Georgetown-Syracuse game, then underway at the Verizon Center across town. The protesters quietly dispersed.

=== Big East tournament ===
Seeded fifth in the 2006 Big East tournament, Georgetown defeated 12th-seeded Notre Dame in the first round, with Bowman recovering from his late-season slump to score 25 points, Wallace putting in an eight-point, six-rebound, four-assist performance, and Green scoring 13 points and pulling down nine rebounds. Hibbert scored only four points but had 11 rebounds and four assists. In the quarterfinals, Green led the team with 16 points, nine rebounds, and five assists and Bowman scored 11 as the Hoyas upset fourth-seeded Marquette. Sapp scored only two points but grabbed a career-high seven rebounds in the game. Georgetown faced its archrival, ninth-seeded and 16th-ranked Syracuse, in the semifinals. Wallace had 10 points and tied his season high with six assists, Green also scored 10 points and had seven rebounds, and Hibbert had a nine-point, 13-rebound performance, but Ashanti Cook lost the ball twice in the final seconds of a close game and Syracuse prevailed 58–57 to knock the Hoyas out of the tournament.

=== NCAA tournament ===
Boasting a 21–9 record and two wins against ranked teams, Georgetown received an invitation to the NCAA tournament for the first time since the 2000–01 team appeared in the 2001 tournament and only the second time since the 1996–97 team played in the 1997 tournament. Seeded seventh in the Minneapolis Region in the 2006 tournament, the Hoyas faced Northern Iowa in the first round. Hibbert led the team with 17 points and nine rebounds and Ashanti Cook hit crucial free throws as Georgetown won. In the second round, Georgetown upset the region's No. 2 seed, sixth-ranked Ohio State, with Green scoring 19 points, collecting eight rebounds, and dealing out six assists, Hibbert posting his seventh double-double of the year with 20 points, 14 rebounds, and three blocked shots, Darrel Owens scoring 13 points, and Cook playing 37 minutes in which he shot 7-for-11 (63.6%) from the field, scored 17 points, grabbed five rebounds, dished out five assists, and committed only one turnover. Georgetown's season came to an end in the Minneapolis Region semifinals against the region's No. 3 seed and eventual national champion, 11th-ranked Florida. Green put in a 15-point, six-rebound, four-assist effort, Hibbert scored 10 points, grabbed seven rebounds, and blocked three shots, and Owens played a tough defense in the losing effort, and Florida was not able to secure the win until Owens missed a key three-pointer late in the game. The Hoyas came closer than any other team to beating Florida during the Gators' national championship tournament run.

The Hoyas′ 23–10 record gave Georgetown its first 20-plus win season since 2000–01. They were ranked No. 23 in the final Associated Press Poll of the year and No. 16 in the postseason Coaches' Poll, the first Georgetown team to finish the season with a national ranking since 2000–01.

In October 2006, just before the following season began, sophomore guard Josh Thornton opted to leave the team, and he transferred from Georgetown to Towson at the end of the fall 2006 semester. He had not appeared in a game since the February 9, 2006, meeting with St. John's, and he transferred in search of greater playing time.

== Roster ==
2005–06 Georgetown Hoyas men's basketball team
Players
Coaches

| Pos. | # | Name | Height | Weight | Year | Previous school | Hometown |
|---|---|---|---|---|---|---|---|
| G | 0 | Ashanti Cook | 6 ft 2 in (1.88 m) | 185 lb (84 kg) | Sr | Westchester High School | Inglewood, CA |
| F | 1 | Brandon Bowman | 6 ft 9 in (2.06 m) | 223 lb (101 kg) | Sr | Westchester High School | Santa Monica, CA |
| G | 2 | Jonathan Wallace | 6 ft 1 in (1.85 m) | 188 lb (85 kg) | So | Sparkman High School | Harvest, Alabama |
| F | 4 | Kenny Izzo | 6 ft 9 in (2.06 m) | 230 lb (104 kg) | Jr | Fenwick High School | Chicago, Illinois |
| G/F | 20 | Darrel Owens | 6 ft 7 in (2.01 m) | 215 lb (98 kg) | Sr | Assumption High School | Napoleonville, Louisiana |
| G | 21 | Jessie Sapp | 6 ft 3 in (1.91 m) | 205 lb (93 kg) | Fr | National Christian Academy | New York City, New York |
| G/F | 22 | Tyler Crawford | 6 ft 3 in (1.91 m) | 206 lb (93 kg) | So | Robert E. Lee High School | Stuarts Draft, Virginia |
| G | 23 | Josh Thorton | 6 ft 2 in (1.88 m) | 170 lb (77 kg) | Fr | Caesar Rodney High School | Rochester, New York |
| F | 24 | Octavius Spann | 6 ft 7 in (2.01 m) | 215 lb (98 kg) | Fr | Banneker High School | College Park, Georgia |
| F | 32 | Jeff Green | 6 ft 9 in (2.06 m) | 235 lb (107 kg) | So | Northwestern High School | Hyattsville, Maryland |
| F | 34 | Marc Egerson | 6 ft 6 in (1.98 m) | 225 lb (102 kg) | Fr | Glasgow High School | Wilmington, Delaware |
| G | 40 | Ryan Beal | 6 ft 5 in (1.96 m) | 215 lb (98 kg) | Sr | Ransom Everglades School | Coral Gables, Florida |
| F/C | 44 | Amadou Kilkenny-Diaw | 6 ft 9 in (2.06 m) | 240 lb (109 kg) | Sr | St. Albans School | Washington, D.C. |
| F | 52 | Sead Dizdarevic | 6 ft 9 in (2.06 m) | 240 lb (109 kg) | Jr | Highlands High School | Bijelo Polje, Montenegro |
| C | 55 | Roy Hibbert | 7 ft 2 in (2.18 m) | 283 lb (128 kg) | So | Georgetown Preparatory School | Adelphi, Maryland |
| F | 33 | Patrick Ewing Jr. | 6 ft 8 in (2.03 m) | 238 lb (108 kg) | RS Jr | National Christian Academy | Marietta, Georgia |

Head coach

John Thompson III

Assistant coach(es)

Robert Burke
Kevin Broadus
Sydney Johnson

Legend

- (C) Team captain
- (S) Suspended
- (I) Ineligible
- (W) Walk-on
- Injured
- Current redshirt

Roster
Last update: December 29, 2012

== Rankings ==
Ranking movement Legend: ██ Improvement in ranking. ██ Decrease in ranking. ██ Not ranked the previous week. RV=Others receiving votes.
| Poll | Pre | Wk 1 | Wk 2 | Wk 3 | Wk 4 | Wk 5 | Wk 6 | Wk 7 | Wk 8 | Wk 9 | Wk 10 | Wk 11 | Wk 12 | Wk 13 | Wk 14 | Wk 15 | Wk 16 | Wk 17 | Final | Post |
|---|---|---|---|---|---|---|---|---|---|---|---|---|---|---|---|---|---|---|---|---|
| AP | | | | | | | | | | | | 21 | 17 | 15 | 17 | 23 | 20 | 23 | 23 | – (Note: No Associated Press Poll this week.) |
| Coaches | | – (Note: No Coaches' Poll this week.) | | | | | | | | | | | | 22 | 16 | 17 | 23 | 20 | 24 | 16 |

== Schedule and results ==
| Date time, TV | Rank^{#} | Opponent^{#} | Result | Record | Site (attendance) city, state |
Regular season
| November 18, 2005*; 7:30 p.m., CSTV | | at Navy | W 72–49 | 1–0 | Alumni Hall (4,104); Annapolis, MD |
| November 21, 2005*; 7:00 p.m. | | at James Madison | W 73–66 | 2–0 | JMU Convocation Center (5,566); Harrisonburg, VA |
| November 26, 2005*; 1:00 p.m. | | Vanderbilt | L 61–68 | 2–1 | MCI Center (7,526); Washington, DC |
| December 3, 2005*; 3:00 p.m., FSN | | at Oregon | W 71–57 | 3–1 | McArthur Court (9,087); Eugene, OR |
| December 8, 2005*; 9:00 p.m., ESPN | | at No. 11 Illinois | L 48–58 | 3–2 | Assembly Hall (16,618); Champaign, IL |
| December 11, 2005*; 1:00 p.m. | | Fairfield | W 76–51 | 4–2 | MCI Center (6,518); Washington, DC |
| December 17, 2005*; 7:30 p.m. | | Stetson | W 70–50 | 5–2 | MCI Center (2,146); Washington, DC |
| December 21, 2005*; 7:30 p.m. | | Savannah State | W 79–49 | 6–2 | MCI Center (4,875); Washington, DC |
| December 27, 2005*; 11:05 p.m. | | vs. Colgate; Sun Bowl Classic semifinals | W 61–45 | 7–2 | Don Haskins Center (9,410); El Paso, TX |
| December 28, 2005*; 9:30 p.m. | | at UTEP; Sun Bowl Classic finals | W 76–64 | 8–2 | Don Haskins Center (2,228); El Paso, TX |
| January 5, 2006; 7:00 p.m., ESPNU | | Providence | W 72–62 | 9–2 (1–0) | MCI Center (6,985); Washington, DC |
| January 8, 2006; 7:00 p.m., TBD TV | | at St. John's | W 79–65 | 10–2 (2–0) | Madison Square Garden (5,812); New York, NY |
| January 11, 2006; 7:00 p.m., TBD TV | | at No. 16 West Virginia | L 61–68 | 10–3 (2–1) | WVU Coliseum (12,116); Morgantown, WV |
| January 14, 2006; 12:00 p.m., WJLA | | at No. 4 Connecticut; Rivalry | L 67–74 | 10–4 (2–2) | XL Center (16,294); Hartford, CT |
| January 17, 2006; 7:30 p.m. | | South Florida | W 50–47 | 11–4 (3–2) | MCI Center (11,816); Washington, DC |
| January 21, 2006*; 1:30 p.m., CBS | | No. 1 Duke | W 87–84 | 12–4 | MCI Center (20,035); Washington, DC |
| January 24, 2006; 7:00 p.m., ESPNU | No. 21 | at Notre Dame | W 85–82 ^{2OT} | 13–4 (4–2) | Purcell Pavilion (10,508); Notre Dame, IN |
| January 28, 2006; 12:00 p.m., ESPN2 | No. 21 | Cincinnati | W 76–57 | 14–4 (5–2) | MCI Center (9,666); Washington, DC |
| January 31, 2006; 8:30 p.m., ESPN Classic | No. 21 | at DePaul | W 64–44 | 15–4 (6–2) | Allstate Arena (9,258); Rosemont, IL |
| February 5, 2006; 12:00 p.m. | No. 17 | No. 9 Pittsburgh | W 61–58 | 16–4 (7–2) | MCI Center (13,284); Washington, DC |
| February 9, 2006; 7:00 p.m., ESPN2 | No. 15 | St. John's | W 64–41 | 17–4 (8–2) | MCI Center (9,739); Washington, DC |
| February 12, 2006; 7:00 p.m., TBD TV | No. 15 | No. 9 West Virginia | L 56–69 | 17–5 (8–3) | MCI Center (16,263); Washington, DC |
| February 16, 2006; 9:00 p.m., ESPN | No. 17 | at Marquette | L 51–57 | 17–6 (8–4) | BMO Harris Bradley Center (15,243); Milwaukee, WI |
| February 19, 2006; 7:00 p.m., WJLA | No. 17 | at No. 4 Villanova | L 65–75 | 17–7 (8–5) | The Pavilion (6,500); Villanova, PA |
| February 22, 2006; 7:30 p.m., ESPN Classic | No. 23 | Rutgers | W 66–50 | 18–7 (9–5) | MCI Center (11,236); Washington, DC |
| February 25, 2006; 12:00 p.m., TBD TV | No. 23 | Syracuse; Rivalry | W 68–53 | 19–7 (10–5) | MCI Center (18,879); Washington, DC |
| March 4, 2006; 7:00 p.m. | No. 20 | at South Florida | L 56–63 | 19–8 (10–6) | USF Sun Dome (6,088); Tampa, FL |
Big East tournament
| March 8, 2006*; 2:00 p.m., ESPN | (5 S) No. 23 | vs. (12 S) Notre Dame; First Round | W 67–63 | 20–8 | Madison Square Garden (19,594); New York, NY |
| March 9, 2006*; 2:00 p.m., ESPN | (5 S) No. 23 | vs. (4 S) Marquette; Quarterfinal | W 62–59 | 21–8 | Madison Square Garden (19,594); New York, NY |
| March 9, 2006*; 7:00 p.m., ESPN | (5 S) No. 23 | vs. (9 S) No. 16 Syracuse; Semifinal/Rivalry | L 57–58 | 21–9 | Madison Square Garden (19,594); New York, NY |
NCAA tournament
| March 17, 2006*; 2:35 p.m., CBS | (7 S) No. 23 | vs. (10 S) Northern Iowa; First Round | W 54–49 | 22–9 | University of Dayton Arena (12,945); Dayton, OH |
| March 19, 2006*; 4:50 p.m., CBS | (7 S) No. 23 | vs. (2 S) No. 6 Ohio State; Second Round | W 70–52 | 23–9 | University of Dayton Arena (12,945); Dayton, OH |
| March 24, 2006*; 9:40 p.m., CBS | (7 S) No. 23 | vs. (3 S) No. 11 Florida; Sweet Sixteen | L 53–57 | 23–10 | Metrodome (22,293); Minneapolis, MN |
*Non-conference game. ^{#}Rankings from AP Poll. (#) Tournament seedings in parentheses.

== Awards and honors ==
=== Big East Conference honors ===
Postseason honors
| Honors | Player | Position | Date awarded | Ref. |
|---|---|---|---|---|
| All-Big East Second Team | Jeff Green | F | March 6, 2006 | |
| All-Big East Second Team | Roy Hibbert | C | March 6, 2006 | |
