= 2005–06 Southern Illinois Salukis men's basketball team =

American college basketball season

2005–06 Southern Illinois Salukis men's basketball

MVC Regular season champion

NCAA tournament, first round
- Conference: Missouri Valley Conference
- Record: 22–11 (12–6 MVC)
- Head coach: Chris Lowery (2nd season)
- Home arena: SIU Arena

2005–06 Missouri Valley Conference men's basketball standings
	Conf.				Overall
Team	W		L	PCT	W		L	PCT
Wichita State	14	–	4	.778	26	–	9	.743
Southern Illinois †	12	–	6	.667	22	–	11	.667
Missouri State	12	–	6	.667	22	–	9	.710
Creighton	12	–	6	.667	20	–	10	.667
Bradley	11	–	7	.611	22	–	11	.667
Northern Iowa	11	–	7	.611	23	–	10	.697
Evansville	5	–	13	.278	10	–	19	.345
Drake	5	–	13	.278	12	–	19	.387
Indiana State	4	–	14	.222	13	–	16	.448
Illinois State	4	–	14	.222	9	–	19	.321
† 2006 MVC tournament winner Rankings from AP Poll

The 2005–06 Southern Illinois Salukis men's basketball team represented Southern Illinois University Carbondale during the 2005–06 NCAA Division I men's basketball season. The Salukis were led by second-year head coach Chris Lowery and played their home games at the SIU Arena in Carbondale, Illinois as members of the Missouri Valley Conference. They finished the season 22–11, 12–6 in MVC play to finish tied for second in the regular season standings. The Salukis won the MVC tournament to receive an automatic bid to the NCAA tournament. Playing as the No. 11 seed in the South region, the Salukis were defeated by No. 6 seed West Virginia in the opening round.

== Roster ==
2005–06 Southern Illinois Salukis men's basketball team
Players
Coaches

Pos.	#	Name	Height	Weight	Year	Previous school	Hometown
G	3	Jamaal Tatum	6 ft 2 in (1.88 m)	175 lb (79 kg)	Jr	Helias Catholic	Jefferson City, Missouri
F	14	Randal Falker	6 ft 7 in (2.01 m)	235 lb (107 kg)	So	Gateway	St. Louis, Missouri

Head coach

- Chris Lowery (Southern Illinois)

Assistant coach(es)

Legend

- (C) Team captain
- (S) Suspended
- (I) Ineligible
- (W) Walk-on
- Injured
- Current redshirt

Roster

== Schedule and results ==
Date time, TV	Rank^{#}	Opponent^{#}	Result	Record	Site (attendance) city, state
Exhibition
Nov 6, 2005*; 5:05 p.m.		Missouri–St. Louis	W 89–64		SIU Arena; Carbondale, Illinois
Nov 12, 2005*; 1:05 p.m.		SIU Edwardsville	W 50–31		SIU Arena; Carbondale, Illinois
Non-conference regular season
Nov 18, 2005*; 7:05 p.m.		Louisiana	W 65–47	1–0	SIU Arena (6,226); Carbondale, Illinois
Nov 24, 2005*; 11:00 p.m.		vs. Monmouth; Great Alaska Shootout	L 68–80	1–1	Sullivan Arena (6,882); Anchorage, Alaska
Nov 25, 2005*; 5:00 p.m.		at Alaska Anchorage; Great Alaska Shootout	L 64–72	1–2	Sullivan Arena (5,761); Anchorage, Alaska
Nov 26, 2005*; 1:00 p.m.		vs. Eastern Washington; Great Alaska Shootout	W 80–72	2–2	Sullivan Arena (6,342); Anchorage, Alaska
Nov 30, 2005*; 7:00 p.m.		at Saint Louis	L 42–56	2–3	Scottrade Center (8,875); St. Louis, Missouri
Dec 3, 2005*; 3:00 p.m.		at Wyoming	W 57–53	3–3	Arena-Auditorium (5,599); Laramie, Wyoming
Dec 10, 2005*; 7:05 p.m.		Kent State	W 58–51	4–3	SIU Arena (6,548); Carbondale, Illinois
Dec 18, 2005*; 1:00 p.m.		at Central Michigan	W 64–54	5–3	McGuirk Arena (1,519); Mount Pleasant, Michigan
Dec 22, 2005*; 7:05 p.m.		Little Rock	W 67–42	6–3	SIU Arena (6,476); Carbondale, Illinois
Dec 28, 2005*; 9:00 p.m.		at Murray State	W 57–53	7–3	Regional Special Events Center (4,297); Murray, Kentucky
MVC Regular season
Dec 31, 2005; 2:05 p.m.		Drake	W 64–50	8–3 (1–0)	SIU Arena (6,839); Carbondale, Illinois
Jan 2, 2006; 8:05 p.m.		Wichita State	W 58–49	9–3 (2–0)	SIU Arena (6,059); Carbondale, Illinois
Jan 5, 2006; 6:05 p.m.		at Indiana State	W 55–49	10–3 (3–0)	Hulman Center (3,940); Terre Haute, Indiana
Jan 8, 2006; 2:05 p.m., ESPNU		Bradley	W 67–55	11–3 (4–0)	SIU Arena (7,594); Carbondale, Illinois
Jan 11, 2006; 7:05 p.m.		Evansville	W 66–38	12–3 (5–0)	SIU Arena (5,982); Carbondale, Illinois
Jan 14, 2006; 7:05 p.m.		Drake	W 47–46	13–3 (6–0)	SIU Arena (5,829); Carbondale, Illinois
Jan 16, 2006; 7:05 p.m.		at Northern Iowa	L 65–71 ^{2OT}	13–4 (6–1)	UNI-Dome (5,304); Cedar Falls, Iowa
Jan 19, 2006; 7:05 p.m.		at Missouri State	L 63–71	13–5 (6–2)	Hammons Student Center (7,252); Springfield, Missouri
Jan 22, 2006; 2:05 p.m.		Illinois State	W 56–44	14–5 (7–2)	SIU Arena (7,529); Carbondale, Illinois
Jan 24, 2006; 7:05 p.m.		Creighton	W 62–48	15–5 (8–2)	SIU Arena (9,004); Carbondale, Illinois
Jan 28, 2006; 4:05 p.m.		at Illinois State	W 65–52	16–5 (9–2)	Redbird Arena (7,051); Normal, Illinois
Feb 1, 2006; 7:05 p.m.		Indiana State	L 54–63	16–6 (9–3)	SIU Arena (7,289); Carbondale, Illinois
Feb 4, 2006; 11:00 a.m.		at Wichita State	L 63–71 ^{2OT}	16–7 (9–4)	Charles Koch Arena (10,478); Wichita, Kansas
Feb 7, 2006; 8:05 p.m.		Missouri State	W 66–64	17–7 (10–4)	SIU Arena (6,848); Carbondale, Illinois
Feb 11, 2006; 1:00 p.m.		at Creighton	W 74–67	18–7 (11–4)	Qwest Center Omaha (15,552); Omaha, Nebraska
Feb 14, 2006; 7:35 p.m., MVC-TV		at Bradley	L 60–72	18–8 (11–5)	Carver Arena (9,613); Peoria, Illinois
Feb 18, 2006*; 5:00 p.m.		Louisiana Tech; ESPN BracketBusters	L 51–54	18–9	SIU Arena (9,168); Carbondale, Illinois
Feb 21, 2006; 8:05 p.m.		at Evansville	L 59–64	18–10 (11–6)	Roberts Municipal Stadium (5,118); Evansville, Indiana
Feb 25, 2006; 1:05 p.m.		No. 25 Northern Iowa	W 46–45	19–10 (12–6)	SIU Arena (9,222); Carbondale, Illinois
Missouri Valley tournament
Mar 3, 2006*; 6:05 p.m.	(2)	vs. (7) Evansville; Quarterfinals	W 71–55	20–10	Savvis Center (14,533); St. Louis, Missouri
Mar 4, 2006*; 4:05 p.m.	(2)	vs. (6) Northern Iowa; Semifinals	W 55–46 ^{OT}	21–10	Savvis Center (17,772); St. Louis, Missouri
Mar 5, 2006*; 2:05 p.m., CBS	(2)	vs. (5) Bradley; Championship game	W 59–46	22–10	Savvis Center (13,969); St. Louis, Missouri
NCAA tournament
Mar 17, 2006*; 1:55 p.m.	(11 S)	vs. (6 S) No. 22 West Virginia; First round	L 46–64	22–11	Palace of Auburn Hills (18,456); Auburn Hills, Michigan
*Non-conference game. ^{#}Rankings from AP poll. (#) Tournament seedings in parentheses. S=South. All times are in Central Time.
