= 2005–06 Bradley Braves men's basketball team =

American college basketball season

2005–06 Bradley Braves men's basketball

NCAA Tournament, Sweet Sixteen
- Conference: Missouri Valley Conference

Ranking
- Coaches: No. 24
- Record: 22–11 (11–7 MVC)
- Head coach: Jim Les (4th season)
- Home arena: Carver Arena

2005–06 Missouri Valley Conference men's basketball standings
	Conf.				Overall
Team	W		L	PCT	W		L	PCT
Wichita State	14	–	4	.778	26	–	9	.743
Southern Illinois †	12	–	6	.667	22	–	11	.667
Missouri State	12	–	6	.667	22	–	9	.710
Creighton	12	–	6	.667	20	–	10	.667
Bradley	11	–	7	.611	22	–	11	.667
Northern Iowa	11	–	7	.611	23	–	10	.697
Evansville	5	–	13	.278	10	–	19	.345
Drake	5	–	13	.278	12	–	19	.387
Indiana State	4	–	14	.222	13	–	16	.448
Illinois State	4	–	14	.222	9	–	19	.321
† 2006 MVC tournament winner Rankings from AP Poll

The 2005–06 Bradley Braves men's basketball team represented Bradley University as a member of the Missouri Valley Conference during the 2005–06 NCAA Division I men's basketball season. Led by head coach Jim Les, the Braves finished the season with a 22-11 record (11-7 MVC). They earned an at-large bid to the NCAA tournament as #13 seed in the Oakland Regional. The team defeated Kansas and Pittsburgh to reach the Sweet Sixteen, before falling to Memphis in the regional semifinal.

== Recruiting ==
College recruiting information
Name	Hometown	School	Height	Weight	Commit date
Zach Andrews; PF	Marysville, CA	Yuba HS	6 ft 8 in (2.03 m)	215 lb (98 kg)	Aug 30, 2004
Zach Andrews; PF	Recruit ratings: Scout: Rivals: (N/A)				
Ray Brown; SG	Richfield, MN	Richfield Senior HS	6 ft 6 in (1.98 m)	185 lb (84 kg)	Sep 16, 2004
Ray Brown; SG	Recruit ratings: Scout: Rivals: (N/A)				
Will Franklin; PG	Houston, TX	Kilgore JC	6 ft 0 in (1.83 m)	180 lb (82 kg)	May 7, 2005
Will Franklin; PG	Recruit ratings: Scout: Rivals: (N/A)				
Overall recruit ranking: Scout: NR Rivals: NR ESPN: N/A
Note: In many cases, Scout, Rivals, 247Sports, On3, and ESPN may conflict in their listings of height and weight.; In these cases, the average was taken. ESPN grades are on a 100-point scale.; Sources: "Bradley 2005 Basketball Commitments". Rivals.; "2005 Bradley Basketball Commits". Scout.; "ESPN". ESPN.; "Scout.com Team Recruiting Rankings". Scout.; "2005 Team Ranking". Rivals.

== Roster ==
Name	#	Position	Height	Weight	Year	Home town
Danny Adams	32	Guard	6–4	217	Junior	Metamora, IL
Zach Andrews	21	Forward	6–8	225	Junior	Sacramento, CA
Tony Bennett	5	Guard	6–0	175	Senior	Chicago, IL
Ray Brown	2	Guard	6-6	195	Freshman	Richfield, MN
Jeremy Crouch	14	Guard	6–5	211	Sophomore	Pekin, IL
Will Franklin	4	Guard	6–0	185	Junior	Houston, TX
Brandyn Heemskerk	55	Center	7-1	260	Senior	Grand Rapids, MI
Saihou Jassey	1	Forward	6–6	200	Freshman	Banjul, Gambia
Brian Lavin	44	Guard	6–0	165	Freshman	Peoria, IL
Patrick O'Bryant	13	Center	7-0	260	Sophomore	Blaine, MN
Daniel Ruffin	20	Guard	5-10	165	Sophomore	Peoria, IL
Sam Singh	54	Forward	6–9	260	Freshman	Ozark, MO
Marcellus Sommerville	15	Forward	6–7	225	Senior	Peoria, IL
J.J. Tauai	10	Guard	6–3	215	Junior	Verona, MO
Lawrence Wright	22	Forward	6–4	198	Senior	Beale Air Force Base, CA

== Schedule ==
Date time, TV	Rank^{#}	Opponent^{#}	Result	Record	Site (attendance) city, state
Regular season
2005/11/19*; 1:00 pm		at DePaul	W 75–60	1–0	Allstate Arena (8,797); Rosemont, IL
2005/11/26*; 2:00 pm		Chicago State	W 68–58	2–0	Carver Arena (8,007); Peoria, IL
2005/11/30*; 7:00 pm		Loyola (IL)	L 72–86	2–1	Joseph J. Gentile Center (2,915); Chicago, IL
2005/12/03*; 7:00 pm		Bowling Green	W 93–64	3–1	Carver Arena (9,121); Peoria, IL
2005/12/06*; 7:00 pm		at Butler	L 60–70	3–2	Hinkle Fieldhouse (2,694); Indianapolis, Indiana
2005/12/14*; 7:00 pm		Western Kentucky	W 78–76	4–2	Carver Arena (7,514); Peoria, IL
2005/12/17*; 7:00 pm		Delaware State	W 68–46	5–2	Carver Arena (7,880); Peoria, IL
2005/12/21*; 7:00 pm		at Southern Miss	W 56–43	6–2	Reed Green Coliseum (2,577); Hattiesburg, MS
2005/12/28; 7:00 pm		Northern Iowa	W 68–60 ^{OT}	7–2 (1–0)	Carver Arena (9,644); Peoria, IL
2005/12/30; 6:00 pm, MVC-TV		at Wichita State	L 67–69 ^{OT}	7–3 (1–1)	Charles Koch Arena (10,478); Wichita, KS
2006/01/02; 7:00 pm		Creighton	W 86–69	8–3 (2–1)	Carver Arena (9,109); Peoria, IL
2006/01/05; 7:00 pm		at Drake	L 73–75	8–4 (2–2)	Knapp Center (3,731); Des Moines, IA
2008/01/08; 2:00 pm, ESPNU		at Southern Illinois	L 55–67	8–5 (2–3)	SIU Arena (7,594); Carbondale, IL
2006/01/11; 7:00 pm		Wichita State	L 76–86	8–6 (2–4)	Carver Arena (8,714); Peoria, IL
2006/01/14; 2:00 pm		Evansville	W 90–62	9–6 (3–4)	Carver Arena (9,890); Peoria, IL
2006/01/18; 7:00 pm, MVC-TV		at Creighton	L 76–80	9–7 (3–5)	Qwest Center Omaha (13,579); Omaha, NE
2006/01/21; 7:00 pm		Indiana State	W 85–63	10–7 (4–5)	Carver Arena (10,240); Peoria, IL
2006/01/25; 7:00 pm		Missouri State	L 86–89	11–7 (5–5)	Carver Arena (9,053); Peoria, IL
2006/01/28; 7:00 pm		at Evansville	W 79–76 ^{OT}	12–7 (6–5)	Roberts Stadium (5,262); Evansville, IN
2006/02/01; 7:30 pm		Illinois State	W 73–44	13–7 (7–5)	Carver Arena (11,164); Peoria, IL
2006/02/04; 7:00 pm		at Missouri State	L 62–70	13–8 (7–6)	Hammons Student Center (7,866); Springfield, MO
2006/02/08; 7:30 pm		at Indiana State	L 63–75	13–9 (7–7)	Hulman Center (3,729); Terre Haute, IN
2006/02/11; 4:00 pm		at Illinois State	W 71–59	14–9 (8–7)	Redbird Arena (8,388); Normal, IL
2006/02/14; 7:30 pm, MVC-TV		Southern Illinois	W 72–60	15–9 (9–7)	Carver Arena (9,613); Peoria, IL
2006/02/18*; 7:00 pm		Tennessee Tech; ESPN BracketBusters	W 77–62	16–9	Carver Arena (9,023); Peoria, IL
2006/02/22; 7:30 pm, MVC-TV		at No. 25 Northern Iowa	W 64–49	17–9 (10–7)	UNI-Dome (8,074); Cedar Falls, IA
2006/02/25; 7:00 pm		Drake	W 86–66	18–9 (11–7)	Carver Arena (10,114); Peoria, IL
Missouri Valley Tournament
2006/03/03; 2:30 pm, MVC-TV	(5)	vs. (4) Creighton; Quarterfinals	W 54–47	19–9	Savvis Center (11,782); St. Louis, MO
2006/03/04; 1:30 pm, MVC-TV	(5)	vs. (1) Wichita State; Semifinals	W 60–52	20–9	Savvis Center (17,772); St. Louis, MO
2006/03/05; 1:00 pm, CBS	(5)	vs. (2) Southern Illinois; Championship	L 46–59	20–10	Scottrade Center (13,969); St. Louis, MO
NCAA Tournament
2006/03/17*; 9:40 pm, CBS	(13 O)	vs. (4 O) No. 12 Kansas; First Round	W 77–73	21–10	Palace of Auburn Hills (19,400); Auburn Hills, MI
2006/03/19*; 12:10 pm, CBS	(13 O)	vs. (5 O) No. 16 Pittsburgh; Second Round	W 72–66	22–10	Palace of Auburn Hills (19,689); Auburn Hills, MI
2006/03/23*; 7:00 pm, CBS	(13 O)	vs. (1 O) No. 4 Memphis; Sweet Sixteen	L 64–80	22–11	Oracle Arena (19,596); Oakland, CA
*Non-conference game. ^{#}Rankings from AP Poll. (#) Tournament seedings in parentheses. O=Oakland Region. All times are in Central Time.

== Team players in the 2006 NBA draft ==
Round	Pick	Player	NBA club
1	9	Patrick O'Bryant	Golden State Warriors
