= Chris Lowery =

American basketball coach (born 1972)

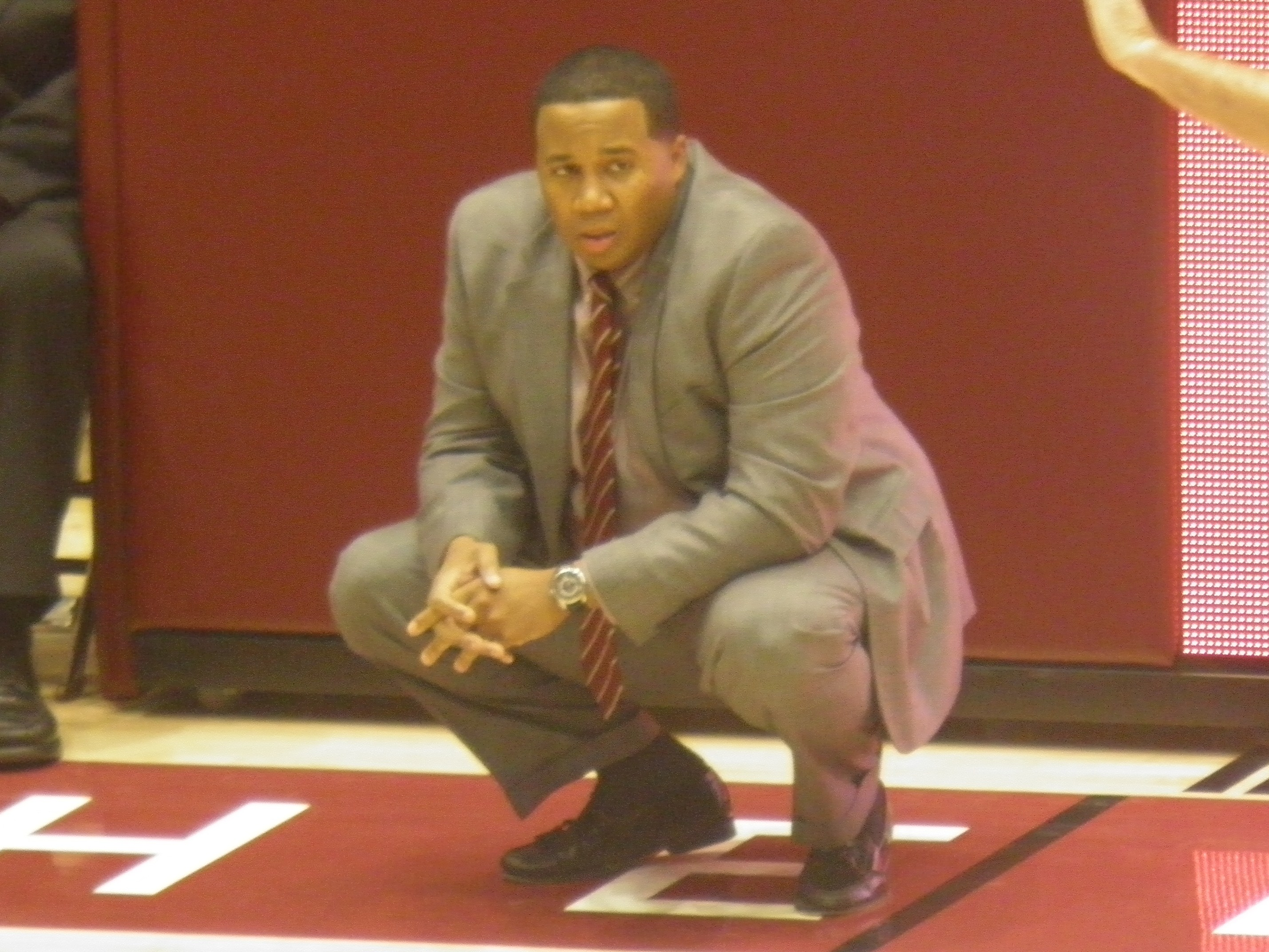

Current position
- Title: Associate head coach
- Team: Northwestern
- Conference: Big Ten

Biographical details
- Born: July 7, 1972 (age 54); Evansville, Indiana, U.S.

Playing career
- 1990–1994: Southern Illinois
- Position: Point guard

Coaching career (HC unless noted)
- 1995–1997: Rend Lake (assistant)
- 1997–2000: Missouri Southern (assistant)
- 2000–2001: SE Missouri State (assistant)
- 2001–2003: Southern Illinois (assistant)
- 2003–2004: Illinois (assistant)
- 2004–2012: Southern Illinois
- 2012–2022: Kansas State (associate HC)
- 2022: Missouri State (associate HC)
- 2022–present: Northwestern (assistant)

Head coaching record
- Overall: 145–115 (.558)
- Tournaments: 3–3 (NCAA Division I); 1–1 (NIT)

Accomplishments and honors

Championships
- 2 MVC regular season (2005, 2007); MVC tournament (2006)

Awards
- 2× MVC Coach of the Year (2005, 2007)

Christopher Michael Lowery (born July 7, 1972) is an American college basketball coach currently serving as an assistant men's basketball coach at Northwestern University under head coach Chris Collins. He was previously the head men's basketball coach at Southern Illinois University Carbondale. He started in the spring of 2004 and was fired on March 2, 2012.

== Playing and coaching career ==
Born in Evansville, Indiana, Lowery was a standout player for the Evansville Harrison Warriors, bridging the "Calbert Cheaney-era" to the "Walter McCarty-era," Lowery played at Southern Illinois for legendary Rich Herrin from 1990 to 1994 and later became an assistant coach, eventually serving under Bruce Weber at Southern Illinois and moving with him to Illinois after the 2002–03 season. On April 9, 2004, Lowery was named the head coach of Southern Illinois men's basketball team after Matt Painter left to become an associate head coach/head coach designate to Gene Keady at Purdue University.

On March 1, 2007, Lowery was named Missouri Valley Conference Coach of the Year after leading SIU to a 25–5 regular season record. A highlight win for the season was when they beat the highly ranked Butler Bulldogs on the road. The Salukis received a four-seed in the 2007 NCAA tournament, the highest for any Valley team since Indiana State received a one-seed in 1979.

On April 2, 2007, Lowery signed a seven-year contract extension. worth $750,000 annually. On March 10, 2011, Lowery received a vote of confidence from athletic director Mario Moccia at a joint press conference, despite Southern Illinois suffering its third season with a .500 record or below and growing pressure from fans and alumni to fire Lowery.

Lowery and the Salukis continued their losing ways in the 2011–12 season, posting a career-low 8–23 overall record with a 5–13 mark in conference play. Lowery was fired the following morning.

Lowery was hired as an assistant to Weber at Kansas State University on April 5, 2012.

Lowery was hired as an assistant coach at Missouri State on May 1, 2022.

Lowery was hired as an assistant coach at Northwestern on July 27, 2022

== Head coaching record ==
Record table
Season	Team	Overall	Conference	Standing	Postseason
Southern Illinois Salukis (Missouri Valley Conference) (2004–2012)
2004–05	Southern Illinois	27–7	15–3	1st	NCAA Division I Second Round
2005–06	Southern Illinois	22–11	12–6	T–2nd	NCAA Division I First Round
2006–07	Southern Illinois	29–7	15–3	1st	NCAA Division I Sweet 16
2007–08	Southern Illinois	18–15	11–7	3rd	NIT Second Round
2008–09	Southern Illinois	13–18	8–10	5th	
2009–10	Southern Illinois	15–15	6–12	9th	
2010–11	Southern Illinois	13–19	5–13	8th	
2011–12	Southern Illinois	8–23	5–13	9th	
Southern Illinois:		145–115 (.558)	77–67 (.535)		
Total:		145–115 (.558)			
National champion Postseason invitational champion Conference regular season champion Conference regular season and conference tournament champion Division regular season champion Division regular season and conference tournament champion Conference tournament champion
