= 2005–06 Illinois State Redbirds men's basketball team =

American college basketball season

2005–06 Illinois State Redbirds men's basketball
- Conference: Missouri Valley Conference
- Record: 9–19 (4–14 MVC)
- Head coach: Porter Moser (3rd season)
- Assistant coaches: Brian Barone; Daniyal Robinson; Chris Jans
- Home arena: Redbird Arena

2005–06 Missouri Valley Conference men's basketball standings
	Conf.				Overall
Team	W		L	PCT	W		L	PCT
Wichita State	14	–	4	.778	26	–	9	.743
Southern Illinois †	12	–	6	.667	22	–	11	.667
Missouri State	12	–	6	.667	22	–	9	.710
Creighton	12	–	6	.667	20	–	10	.667
Bradley	11	–	7	.611	22	–	11	.667
Northern Iowa	11	–	7	.611	23	–	10	.697
Evansville	5	–	13	.278	10	–	19	.345
Drake	5	–	13	.278	12	–	19	.387
Indiana State	4	–	14	.222	13	–	16	.448
Illinois State	4	–	14	.222	9	–	19	.321
† 2006 MVC tournament winner Rankings from AP Poll

The 2005–06 Illinois State Redbirds men's basketball team represented Illinois State University during the 2005–06 NCAA Division I men's basketball season. The Redbirds, led by third year head coach Porter Moser, played their home games at Redbird Arena and competed as a member of the Missouri Valley Conference.

They finished the season 9–19, 4–14 in conference play to finish in a tie for ninth place. They were the number ten seed for the Missouri Valley Conference tournament. They were defeated by the University of Evansville in their opening round game.

== Roster ==
2005–06 Illinois State Redbirds men's basketball team
Players
Coaches

Pos.	#	Name	Height	Weight	Year	Hometown
G	25	Neil Plank	6 ft 5 in (1.96 m)	—	RS Sr	Mount Zion, IL
G	43	Dana Ford	6 ft 4 in (1.93 m)	—	Sr	Tamms, IL
G	3	Nedu Onyeuku	6 ft 3 in (1.91 m)	—	Sr	Omaha, NE
G	14	Travis Wallace	6 ft 0 in (1.83 m)	—	Sr	St. Louis, MO
F	50	Greg Dilligard	6 ft 8 in (2.03 m)	—	Jr	La Belle, MO
G	1	Roberto Fortes	6 ft 4 in (1.93 m)	—	Jr	Fort Wayne, IN
G	23	Mark Kruse	6 ft 7 in (2.01 m)	—	Jr	St. Cloud, MN
C	51	Ronnie Carlwell	6 ft 11 in (2.11 m)	—	RS So	Maywood, IL
C	32	Levi Dyer	6 ft 10 in (2.08 m)	—	So	Eaton, CO
G	5	Khalif Ford	6 ft 1 in (1.85 m)	—	So	Diamond Bar, CA
G	45	Brandon Holtz	6 ft 4 in (1.93 m)	—	Fr	Bloomington, IL
F	42	Dinma Odiakosa	6 ft 8 in (2.03 m)	—	Fr	Akwukwu-Igbo, Nigeria
F	31	Mike Vandello	6 ft 7 in (2.01 m)	—	Fr	Bettendorf, IA
G	24	Eric Vianney	6 ft 2 in (1.88 m)	—	Fr	Yaounde, Cameroon

Head coach

- Porter Moser (Creighton)

Assistant coach(es)

- Brian Barone (Marquette)
- Daniyal Robinson (Little Rock)
- Chris Jans (Loras)

Legend

- (C) Team captain
- (S) Suspended
- (I) Ineligible
- (W) Walk-on
- Injured
- Current redshirt

== Schedule ==
Date time, TV	Rank^{#}	Opponent^{#}	Result	Record	High points	High rebounds	High assists	Site (attendance) city, state
Exhibition Season
November 9, 2005*; 7:05 pm		Augustana (South Dakota)	W 60–49		15 – Plank	9 – Plank	–	Redbird Arena; Normal, IL
Regular Season
November 19, 2005*; 2:05 pm		Indianapolis	W 54–50	1–0	12 – Plank	5 – D.Ford, K.Ford	5 – K.Ford	Redbird Arena (3,747); Normal, IL
November 22, 2005*; 7:00 pm		at Cincinnati	L 59–76	1–1	16 – Dilligard	6 – D.Ford	6 – Plank	Fifth Third Arena (8,802); Cincinnati, OH
November 26, 2005*; 2:05 pm		Western Michigan	W 64–47	2–1	16 – Plank	7 – Vandello	3 – D.Ford, Onyeuku, K.Ford	Redbird Arena (3,980); Normal, IL
November 29, 2005*; 7:05 pm		Grambling State	W 62–50	3–1	18 – Dilligard	9 – Dilligard	5 – K.Ford	Redbird Arena (5,149); Normal, IL
December 3, 2005*; 4:05 pm		Wisconsin–Green Bay	W 59–51	4–1	13 – Plank, Dilligard	7 – Dilligard	5 – Vandello	Redbird Arena (5,871); Normal, IL
December 6, 2005*; 7:05 pm		Indiana/Purdue–Fort Wayne	W 65–36	5–1	10 – Plank	7 – Dilligard	7 – Plank	Redbird Arena (5,181); Normal, IL
December 10, 2005*; 7:05 pm		Georgia Southern	L 61–65	5–2	14 – Onyeuku	7 – Plank	4 – Plank	Redbird Arena (6,762); Normal, IL
December 17, 2005*; 9:05 pm		at California State–Northridge	L 69–73	5–3	15 – D.Ford	7 – Plank	7 – Plank	Matador Gymnasium (1,013); Northridge, CA
December 22, 2005; 6:05 pm		at Indiana State	L 59–69 ^{OT}	5–4 (0–1)	22 – Dilligard	12 – Dilligard	4 – K.Ford	Hulman Center (5,072); Terre Haute, IN
December 31, 2005; 2:05 pm		Creighton	W 53–50	6–4 (1–1)	17 – Plank	6 – Plank	3 – Plank, Dilligard, Vandello	Redbird Arena (5,970); Normal, IL
January 2, 2006; 7:05 pm		at Northern Iowa	L 47–60	6–5 (1–2)	12 – Dilligard	5 – Plank	3 – Dilligard	UNI Dome (4,014); Cedar Falls, IA
January 5, 2006; 7:05 pm		at Creighton	L 52–71	6–6 (1–3)	17 – Onyeuku	5 – Dilligard	6 – Plank	Qwest Center Omaha (12,882); Omaha, NE
January 8, 2006; 2:05 pm		Wichita State	L 47–56	6–7 (1–4)	16 – D.Ford	7 – D.Ford	3 – Onyeuku, Plank, Holtz	Redbird Arena (5,289); Normal, IL
January 11, 2006; 7:05 pm		at Missouri State	L 54–70	6–8 (1–5)	9 – Plank, Vandello	7 – Plank, Dilligard, Vandello	3 – Plank	John Q. Hammons Student Center (6,140); Springfield, MO
January 14, 2006; 4:05 pm		Northern Iowa	L 52–67	6–9 (1–6)	14 – Onyeuku	10 – Dilligard	4 – D.Ford	Redbird Arena (5,336); Normal, IL
January 16, 2006; 7:05 pm		Evansville	W 65–57	7–9 (2–6)	14 – Onyeuku	10 – Dilligard	2 – Dilligard, Fortes, Dyer, K.Ford	Redbird Arena (4,143); Normal, IL
January 22, 2006; 2:05 pm		at Southern Illinois	L 44–56	7–10 (2–7)	10 – D.Ford	4 – Odiakosa	3 – D.Ford	SIU Arena (7,529); Carbondale, IL
January 25, 2006; 7:05 pm		Indiana State	W 75–48	8–10 (3–7)	15 – Plank	10 – Odiakosa	3 – D.Ford, Onyeuku	Redbird Arena (5,288); Normal, IL
January 28, 2006; 4:05 pm		Southern Illinois	L 52–65	8–11 (3–8)	12 – Holtz	6 – D.Ford, Dilligard	2 – D.Ford, Kruse	Redbird Arena (7,051); Normal, IL
February 1, 2006; 7:35 pm, WEEK		at Bradley	L 44–73	8–12 (3–9)	12 – Onyeuku	6 – Dilligard	5 – K.Ford	Carver Arena (11,164); Peoria, IL
February 4, 2006; 7:05 pm		at Evansville	L 47–54	8–13 (3–10)	10 – Onyeuku, K.Ford	4 – Dilligard	2 – D.Ford, Fortes, Vandello	Roberts Municipal Stadium (5,302); Evansville, IN
February 7, 2006; 7:05 pm		at Drake	L 41–45	8–14 (3–11)	12 – Dilligard	8 – Dilligard	3 – Plank	The Knapp Center (3,014); Des Monies, IA
February 11, 2006; 4:05 pm, WMBD		Bradley	L 59–71	8–15 (3–12)	16 – Dyer	4 – Dilligard, Dyer	4 – Plank	Redbird Arena (8,388); Normal, IL
February 14, 2006; 7:05 pm		Drake	W 58–56 ^{OT}	9–15 (4–12)	22 – Fortes	10 – Plank	5 – D.Ford	Redbird Arena (4,326); Normal, IL
February 18, 2006*; 3:30 pm		at Miami (Ohio); BracketBusters presented by eBay	L 49–51	9–16	23 – Fortes	9 – Plank	6 – Plank	Millett Hall (3,421); Oxford, OH
February 22, 2006; 7:05 pm		Missouri State	W 62–61	9–17 (4–13)	14 – Fortes	9 – Dilligard	5 – K.Ford	Redbird Arena (4,655); Normal, IL
February 25, 2006; 5:07 pm		at Wichita State	L 57–64	9–18 (4–14)	17 – Dyer	4 – Onyeuku, Dilligard, K.Ford	8 – K.Ford	Charles Koch Arena (10,478); Wichita, KS
Missouri Valley Conference (MVC) tournament
March 2, 2006*; 8:35 pm	(10)	vs. (7) Evansville; Opening Round	L 45–52	9–19	14 – Fortes	10 – Dilligard	4 – Plank	Savvis Center (5,683); St. Louis, MO
*Non-conference game. ^{#}Rankings from AP Poll. (#) Tournament seedings in parentheses. All times are in Central Standard Time.
