= 2005–06 Wichita State Shockers men's basketball team =

American college basketball season

2005–06 Wichita State Shockers men's basketball

Missouri Valley Conference Regular seasons champion

NCAA tournament, Sweet Sixteen
- Conference: Missouri Valley Conference

Ranking
- Coaches: No. 21
- Record: 26–9 (14–4 MVC)
- Head coach: Mark Turgeon (6th season)
- Home arena: Charles Koch Arena

2005–06 Missouri Valley Conference men's basketball standings
	Conf.				Overall
Team	W		L	PCT	W		L	PCT
Wichita State	14	–	4	.778	26	–	9	.743
Southern Illinois †	12	–	6	.667	22	–	11	.667
Missouri State	12	–	6	.667	22	–	9	.710
Creighton	12	–	6	.667	20	–	10	.667
Bradley	11	–	7	.611	22	–	11	.667
Northern Iowa	11	–	7	.611	23	–	10	.697
Evansville	5	–	13	.278	10	–	19	.345
Drake	5	–	13	.278	12	–	19	.387
Indiana State	4	–	14	.222	13	–	16	.448
Illinois State	4	–	14	.222	9	–	19	.321
† 2006 MVC tournament winner Rankings from AP Poll

The 2005–06 Wichita State Shockers men's basketball team represented Wichita State University as a member of the Missouri Valley Conference during the 2005–06 NCAA Division I men's basketball season. The team was led by head coach Mark Turgeon in his sixth season at the school. The Shockers finished atop the MVC regular season standings by 2 games, but lost in the semifinal round of the MVC Tournament. Wichita State received an at-large bid to the NCAA tournament – the school's first bid since 1988. Playing as No. 7 seed in the East region, the team defeated No. 10 seed Seton Hall and No. 2 seed Tennessee to reach the Sweet Sixteen for the first time in 25 years. The run would end there, however, as the Shockers fell to cinderella George Mason in the East regional semi-final.

== Roster ==
2005–06 Wichita State Shockers men's basketball team
Players
Coaches

Pos.	#	Name	Height	Weight	Year	Hometown
G	0	Nick Rogers	6 ft 2 in (1.88 m)	202 lb (92 kg)	Sr	Houston, Texas
G/F	2	P.J. Couisnard	6 ft 4 in (1.93 m)	214 lb (97 kg)	RS So	Houston, Texas
G	3	Cameron Ledford	6 ft 0 in (1.83 m)	175 lb (79 kg)	Sr	Wichita, Kansas
G	4	Ryan Martin	6 ft 5 in (1.96 m)	229 lb (104 kg)	Jr	Kansas City, Kansas
G	5	Wendell Preadom	6 ft 1 in (1.85 m)	193 lb (88 kg)	Fr	Houston, Texas
G	10	Karon Bradley	5 ft 11 in (1.8 m)	190 lb (86 kg)	RS Jr	Houston, Texas
F	11	Phillip Thomasson	6 ft 7 in (2.01 m)	225 lb (102 kg)	Jr	Burleson, Texas
G	20	Gabe Barnes	6 ft 1 in (1.85 m)	170 lb (77 kg)	So	El Dorado, Kansas
F/C	21	Ryan Bradley	6 ft 10 in (2.08 m)	258 lb (117 kg)	Fr	Bradenton, Florida
G	22	Matt Braeuer	5 ft 11 in (1.8 m)	157 lb (71 kg)	So	Belton, Texas
G	31	Jared Young	6 ft 6 in (1.98 m)	185 lb (84 kg)	Jr	Kansas City, Missouri
F	32	Kyle Wilson	6 ft 8 in (2.03 m)	238 lb (108 kg)	RS Jr	Plano, Texas
G	33	Sean Ogirri	6 ft 2 in (1.88 m)	177 lb (80 kg)	So	Denver, Colorado
F/C	44	David King	6 ft 10 in (2.08 m)	243 lb (110 kg)	Fr	Maize, Kansas
C	45	Paul Miller	6 ft 10 in (2.08 m)	250 lb (113 kg)	Sr	Jefferson City, Missouri

Head coach

- Mark Turgeon

Assistant coach(es)

Legend

- (C) Team captain
- (S) Suspended
- (I) Ineligible
- (W) Walk-on
- Injured
- Current redshirt

Roster

== Schedule and results ==
Date time, TV	Rank^{#}	Opponent^{#}	Result	Record	Site city, state
Exhibition
Nov 1, 2005*		Emporia State	W 92–70		Charles Koch Arena; Wichita, Kansas
Nov 10, 2005*		Rockhurst	W 67–55		Charles Koch Arena; Wichita, Kansas
Non-conference regular season
Nov 18, 2005*; 7:05 p.m.		Oklahoma Panhandle State	W 83–55	1–0	Charles Koch Arena (10,478); Wichita, Kansas
Nov 20, 2005*; 2:00 p.m.		vs. Texas Southern; South Padre Island Invitational Preliminary Round	W 86–54	2–0	South Padre Island Convention Centre (10,012); South Padre Island, Texas
Nov 22, 2005*; 7:05 p.m.		vs. Texas–Pan American; South Padre Island Invitational Preliminary Round	W 97–66	3–0	South Padre Island Convention Centre (10,271); South Padre Island, Texas
Nov 25, 2005*; 7:30 p.m., CSTV		vs. No. 15 Illinois; South Padre Island Invitational Semifinal	L 54–55	3–1	South Padre Island Convention Centre (1,500); South Padre Island, Texas
Nov 26, 2005*; 5:00 p.m.		vs. Delaware State; South Padre Island Invitational Consolation	W 62–44	4–1	South Padre Island Convention Centre (1,200); South Padre Island, Texas
Nov 30, 2005*; 7:05 p.m.		Providence	W 82–74	5–1	Charles Koch Arena (10,478); Wichita, Kansas
Dec 3, 2005*; 7:05 p.m.		Northwestern State	W 57–55	6–1	Charles Koch Arena (10,478); Wichita, Kansas
Dec 6, 2005*; 9:00 p.m.		at San Francisco	W 75–67	7–1	War Memorial Gymnasium (2,417); San Francisco, California
Dec 10, 2005*; 6:00 p.m.		vs. No. 13 Michigan State; Spartan Clash	L 64–83	7–2	Palace of Auburn Hills (16,750); Detroit, Michigan
Dec 17, 2005*; 7:00 p.m.		at UMKC	W 77–55	8–2	Municipal Auditorium (2,683); Kansas City, Missouri
Dec 20, 2005*; 7:05 p.m.		Miami (OH)	W 55–46	9–2	Charles Koch Arena (10,478); Wichita, Kansas
MVC Regular season
Dec 28, 2005; 7:05 p.m.		Indiana State	W 66–62	10–2 (1–0)	Charles Koch Arena (10,478); Wichita, Kansas
Dec 30, 2005; 6:05 p.m., MVC-TV		Bradley	W 69–67 ^{OT}	11–2 (2–0)	Charles Koch Arena (10,478); Wichita, Kansas
Jan 2, 2006; 8:05 p.m.		at Southern Illinois	L 49–58	11–3 (2–1)	SIU Arena (6,059); Carbondale, Illinois
Jan 5, 2006; 8:05 p.m.		Northern Iowa	L 61–75	11–4 (2–2)	Charles Koch Arena (10,478); Wichita, Kansas
Jan 8, 2006; 2:05 p.m.		at Illinois State	W 56–47	12–4 (3–2)	Redbird Arena (5,289); Normal, Illinois
Jan 11, 2006; 7:00 p.m.		at Bradley	W 86–76	13–4 (4–2)	Carver Arena (8,714); Peoria, Illinois
Jan 14, 2006; 7:05 p.m.		Missouri State	W 81–57	14–4 (5–2)	Charles Koch Arena (10,478); Wichita, Kansas
Jan 19, 2006; 7:35 p.m.		at Evansville	W 69–62	15–4 (6–2)	Roberts Stadium (4,981); Evansville, Indiana
Jan 22, 2006; 2:05 p.m.		at Missouri State	W 68–62	16–4 (7–2)	Hammons Student Center (7,559); Springfield, Missouri
Jan 25, 2006; 7:05 p.m.		Drake	W 85–62	17–4 (8–2)	Charles Koch Arena (10,478); Wichita, Kansas
Jan 28, 2006; 6:07 p.m.		at Creighton	L 55–57	17–5 (8–3)	Qwest Center Omaha (15,678); Omaha, Nebraska
Feb 1, 2006; 7:05 p.m.		Evansville	W 74–66	18–5 (9–3)	Charles Koch Arena (10,478); Wichita, Kansas
Feb 4, 2006; 11:00 a.m.		Southern Illinois	W 71–63 ^{2OT}	19–5 (10–3)	Charles Koch Arena (10,478); Wichita, Kansas
Feb 7, 2006; 7:05 p.m.		at No. 25 Northern Iowa	L 56–68	19–6 (10–4)	UNI-Dome (8,459); Cedar Falls, Iowa
Feb 11, 2006; 3:07 p.m.		at Indiana State	W 77–58	20–6 (11–4)	Hulman Center (4,097); Terre Haute, Indiana
Feb 14, 2006; 6:05 p.m.		Creighton	W 62–61 ^{OT}	21–6 (12–4)	Charles Koch Arena (10,478); Wichita, Kansas
Feb 18, 2006*; 7:05 p.m., ESPN2		George Mason; ESPN BracketBusters	L 67–70	21–7	Charles Koch Arena (10,478); Wichita, Kansas
Feb 22, 2006; 7:05 p.m.		at Drake	W 60–58	22–7 (13–4)	Knapp Center (3,146); Des Moines, Iowa
Feb 25, 2006; 5:05 p.m.		Illinois State	W 64–57	23–7 (14–4)	Charles Koch Arena (10,478); Wichita, Kansas
MVC Tournament
Mar 3, 2006*	(1)	vs. (9) Indiana State; Quarterfinals	W 81–63	24–7	Scottrade Center; St. Louis, Missouri
Mar 4, 2006*; 1:30 p.m.	(1)	vs. (5) Bradley; Semifinals	L 52–60	24–8	Scottrade Center (17,772); St. Louis, Missouri
NCAA Tournament
Mar 16, 2006*; 11:20 a.m.	(7 E)	vs. (10 E) Seton Hall; First Round	W 86–66	25–8	Greensboro Coliseum (22,073); Greensboro, North Carolina
Mar 18, 2006*; 3:10 p.m.	(7 E)	vs. (2 E) No. 18 Tennessee; Second Round	W 80–73	26–8	Greensboro Coliseum (22,809); Greensboro, North Carolina
Mar 24, 2006*; 6:27 p.m., CBS	(7 E)	vs. (11 E) George Mason; East Regional semifinal – Sweet Sixteen	L 55–63	26–9	Verizon Center (19,718); Washington, D.C.
*Non-conference game. ^{#}Rankings from AP Poll. (#) Tournament seedings in parentheses. E=East. All times are in Central Time.

== Awards and honors ==
- Paul Miller – MVC Player of the Year
