= 2005–06 Creighton Bluejays men's basketball team =

American college basketball season

2005–06 Creighton Bluejays men's basketball
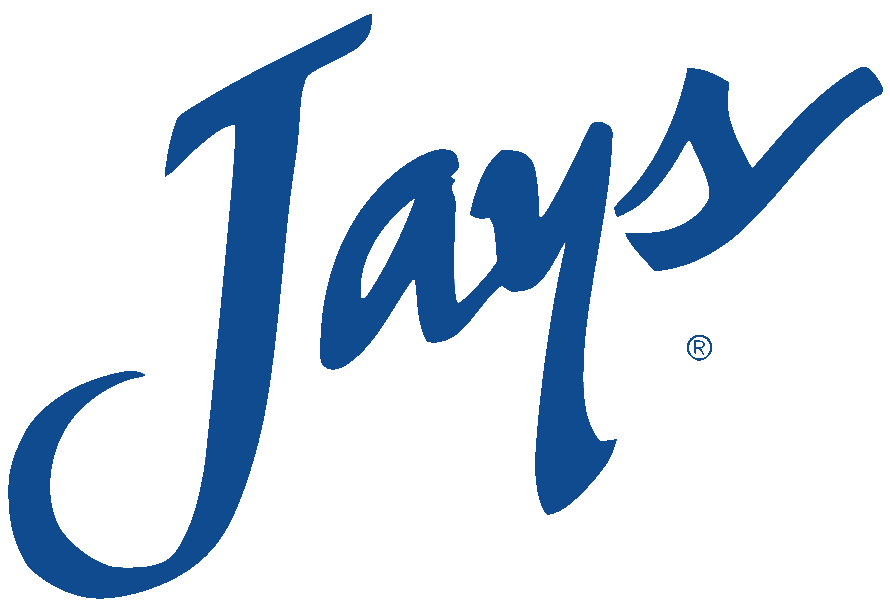

NIT, Second Round
- Conference: Missouri Valley Conference
- Record: 20–10 (12–6 MVC)
- Head coach: Dana Altman (12th season)
- Assistant coaches: Darian DeVries (6th season); Brian Fish (2nd in current stint, 4th overall season); Kevin McKenna (1st season)
- Home arena: Qwest Center Omaha

2005–06 Missouri Valley Conference men's basketball standings
| | Conf. | | | | Overall |
| Team | W | | L | PCT | W | | L | PCT |
|---|---|---|---|---|---|---|---|---|
| Wichita State | 14 | – | 4 | .778 | 26 | – | 9 | .743 |
| Southern Illinois † | 12 | – | 6 | .667 | 22 | – | 11 | .667 |
| Missouri State | 12 | – | 6 | .667 | 22 | – | 9 | .710 |
| Creighton | 12 | – | 6 | .667 | 20 | – | 10 | .667 |
| Bradley | 11 | – | 7 | .611 | 22 | – | 11 | .667 |
| Northern Iowa | 11 | – | 7 | .611 | 23 | – | 10 | .697 |
| Evansville | 5 | – | 13 | .278 | 10 | – | 19 | .345 |
| Drake | 5 | – | 13 | .278 | 12 | – | 19 | .387 |
| Indiana State | 4 | – | 14 | .222 | 13 | – | 16 | .448 |
| Illinois State | 4 | – | 14 | .222 | 9 | – | 19 | .321 |
† 2006 MVC tournament winner Rankings from AP Poll

The 2005–06 Creighton Bluejays men's basketball team represented Creighton University in the 2005–06 NCAA Division I men's basketball season. Led by head coach Dana Altman in his 12th season, the Bluejays would end the regular season tied for second in the MVC standings, but were eliminated in the quarterfinals of the MVC tournament by Bradley. They were invited to the NIT where they defeated Akron before losing to Miami (FL) in the second round to finish the season with a record of 20–10 (12–6 MVC).

== Roster ==
2005–06 Creighton Bluejays men's basketball team
Players
Coaches

| Pos. | # | Name | Height | Weight | Year | Hometown |
|---|---|---|---|---|---|---|
| C | 1 | Jeffrey Day | 6 ft 9 in (2.06 m) | 235 lb (107 kg) | Sr | Seattle, Washington |
| G | 3 | Nick Porter | 6 ft 3 in (1.91 m) | 210 lb (95 kg) | Jr | Compton, California |
| G | 4 | Dominic Bishop | 6 ft 0 in (1.83 m) | 170 lb (77 kg) | Jr | Buffalo, New York |
| G | 5 | Dustin Sitzmann | 6 ft 0 in (1.83 m) | 180 lb (82 kg) | Fr | LeMars, Iowa |
| G | 10 | Nate Funk | 6 ft 3 in (1.91 m) | 195 lb (88 kg) | Sr | Sioux City, Iowa |
| G | 11 | Johnny Mathies | 6 ft 0 in (1.83 m) | 170 lb (77 kg) | Sr | Louisville, Kentucky |
| G | 12 | Josh Dotzler | 6 ft 1 in (1.85 m) | 175 lb (79 kg) | Fr | Omaha, Nebraska |
| G | 20 | Pierce Hibma | 6 ft 5 in (1.96 m) | 205 lb (93 kg) | So | Pella, Iowa |
| C | 22 | Manny Gakou | 6 ft 8 in (2.03 m) | 255 lb (116 kg) | Jr |
| G | 24 | Brice Nengsu | 6 ft 5 in (1.96 m) | 200 lb (91 kg) | So |
| F | 30 | Jimmy Motz | 6 ft 7 in (2.01 m) | 225 lb (102 kg) | Sr | Lincoln, Nebraska |
| C | 44 | Anthony Tolliver | 6 ft 8 in (2.03 m) | 240 lb (109 kg) | Jr | Springfield, Missouri |
| F | 50 | Dane Watts | 6 ft 8 in (2.03 m) | 225 lb (102 kg) | So | Warrensburg, Missouri |
| C | 52 | Steve Smith | 6 ft 11 in (2.11 m) | 254 lb (115 kg) | Fr | Sioux Falls, South Dakota |

Head coach

- Dana Altman

Assistant coach(es)

Legend

- (C) Team captain
- (S) Suspended
- (I) Ineligible
- (W) Walk-on
- Injured
- Current redshirt

== Schedule and results ==
| Date time, TV | Rank^{#} | Opponent^{#} | Result | Record | Site city, state |
Exhibition
| Nov 6, 2005* | | EA Sports | W 74–67 | | Qwest Center Omaha; Omaha, Nebraska |
| Nov 13, 2005* | | Nebraska–Kearney | W 116–82 | | Qwest Center Omaha; Omaha, Nebraska |
Regular season
| Nov 19, 2005*; 1:00 p.m. | | Arkansas–Pine Bluff | W 87–55 | 1–0 | Qwest Center Omaha (12,535); Omaha, Nebraska |
| Nov 22, 2005; 6:00 pm | | at George Mason | W 72–52 | 2–0 | Patriot Center (3,119); Fairfax, Virginia |
| Nov 26, 2005*; 6:00 p.m. | | Dayton | W 91–90 ^{2OT} | 3–0 | Qwest Center Omaha (14,880); Omaha, Nebraska |
| Nov 30, 2005*; 7:30 p.m. | | at DePaul | L 57–72 | 3–1 | Allstate Arena (7,902); Rosemont, Illinois |
| Dec 6, 2005*; 6:00 p.m., KM3 | | Chattanooga | L 64–69 | 3–2 | McKenzie Arena (3,518); Chattanooga, Tennessee |
| Dec 11, 2005*; 1:00 p.m., NET1 | | Nebraska; Rivalry | W 70–44 | 4–2 | Qwest Center Omaha (15,621); Omaha, Nebraska |
| Dec 18, 2005*; 7:00 p.m., KM3 | | Xavier | W 61–59 | 5–2 | Qwest Center Omaha (13,503); Omaha, Nebraska |
| Dec 21, 2005*; 7:00 p.m., KM3 | | Norfolk State | W 63–47 | 6–2 | Qwest Center Omaha (14,776); Omaha, Nebraska |
| Dec 28, 2005; 7:00 p.m., KM3 | | Missouri State | W 78–56 | 7–2 (1–0) | Qwest Center Omaha (13,898); Omaha, Nebraska |
| Dec 31, 2005; 2:00 p.m. | | at Illinois State | L 50–53 | 7–3 (1–1) | Redbird Arena (5,970); Normal, Illinois |
| Jan 2, 2006; 7:00 p.m., KM3 | | at Bradley | L 69–86 | 7–4 (1–2) | Carver Arena (9,109); Peoria, Illinois |
| Jan 5, 2006; 7:00 p.m., KM3 | | Illinois State | W 71–52 | 8–4 (2–2) | Qwest Center Omaha (12,882); Omaha, Nebraska |
| Jan 8, 2006; 2:00 p.m. | | Drake | W 82–69 | 9–4 (3–2) | Qwest Center Omaha (14,796); Omaha, Nebraska |
| Jan 11, 2006; 7:00 p.m., KM3 | | at Northern Iowa | W 55–52 | 10–4 (4–2) | UNI-Dome (8,612); Cedar Falls, Iowa |
| Jan 15, 2006; 1:00 p.m. | | at Indiana State | W 69–53 | 11–4 (5–2) | Hulman Center (3,259); Terre Haute, Indiana |
| Jan 18, 2006; 7:00 p.m., MVC-TV | | Bradley | W 80–76 | 12–4 (6–2) | Qwest Center Omaha (13,579); Omaha, Nebraska |
| Jan 22, 2006; 2:00 p.m., NET1 | | Evansville | W 77–56 | 13–4 (7–2) | Qwest Center Omaha (13,830); Omaha, Nebraska |
| Jan 24, 2006; 7:00 p.m., MVC-TV | | at Southern Illinois | L 48–62 | 13–5 (7–3) | SIU Arena (9,004); Carbondale, Illinois |
| Jan 28, 2006; 6:00 p.m., MVC-TV | | Wichita State | W 57–55 | 14–5 (8–3) | Qwest Center Omaha (15,678); Omaha, Nebraska |
| Jan 31, 2006; 8:00 p.m., ESPNU | | No. 25 Northern Iowa | W 63–55 | 15–5 (9–3) | Qwest Center Omaha (14,878); Omaha, Nebraska |
| Feb 4, 2006; 7:00 p.m. | | at Drake | W 72–67 ^{OT} | 16–5 (10–3) | Knapp Center (6,412); Des Moines, Iowa |
| Feb 7, 2006; 2:00 p.m. | | at Evansville | W 60–56 | 17–5 (11–3) | Roberts Municipal Stadium (5,027); Evansville, Indiana |
| Feb 11, 2006; 1:00 p.m., KM3 | | Southern Illinois | L 67–74 | 17–6 (11–4) | Qwest Center Omaha (15,552); Omaha, Nebraska |
| Feb 14, 2006; 6:00 p.m., ESPNU | | at Wichita State | L 61–62 ^{OT} | 17–7 (11–5) | Charles Koch Arena (10,478); Wichita, Kansas |
| Feb 18, 2006*; 11:00 p.m., ESPN | | Fresno State; ESPN BracketBusters | W 67–62 | 18–7 | Qwest Center Omaha (15,700); Omaha, Nebraska |
| Feb 22, 2006; 7:00 p.m. | | Indiana State | W 67–62 | 19–7 (12–5) | Qwest Center Omaha (13,990); Omaha, Nebraska |
| Feb 25, 2006; 7:30 p.m. | | at Missouri State | L 54–60 | 19–8 (12–6) | Hammons Student Center (9,119); Springfield, Missouri |
Missouri Valley Tournament
| Mar 3, 2006; 2:30 pm, MVC-TV | (4) | vs. (5) Bradley; Quarterfinals | L 47–54 | 19–9 | Savvis Center (11,782); St. Louis, Missouri |
NIT
| Mar 16, 2006*; 7:00 p.m. | (2) | (8) Akron; First Round | W 71–60 | 20–9 | Qwest Center Omaha (10,197); Omaha, Nebraska |
| Mar 20, 2006*; 7:00 p.m. | (2) | (3) Miami (FL); Second Round | L 52–53 | 20–10 | Qwest Center Omaha (10,018); Omaha, Nebraska |
*Non-conference game. ^{#}Rankings from AP Poll. (#) Tournament seedings in parentheses. All times are in Central Time.

== Postseason ==
2006 Missouri Valley Conference men's basketball tournament
3/3/06 Vs. Bradley @ Savvis Center L, 47–54
2006 National Invitation Tournament
3/16/06 Vs. Akron @ Qwest Center Omaha W, 71–60
3/20/06 Vs. Miami (FL) @ Qwest Center Omaha L, 52-53
