= 2005–06 Northern Iowa Panthers men's basketball team =

American college basketball season

2005–06 Northern Iowa Panthers men's basketball

NCAA tournament, first round
- Conference: Missouri Valley Conference
- Record: 23–10 (11–7 MVC)
- Head coach: Greg McDermott (5th season)
- Assistant coach: Ben Jacobson
- Home arena: UNI-Dome

2005–06 Missouri Valley Conference men's basketball standings
	Conf.				Overall
Team	W		L	PCT	W		L	PCT
Wichita State	14	–	4	.778	26	–	9	.743
Southern Illinois †	12	–	6	.667	22	–	11	.667
Missouri State	12	–	6	.667	22	–	9	.710
Creighton	12	–	6	.667	20	–	10	.667
Bradley	11	–	7	.611	22	–	11	.667
Northern Iowa	11	–	7	.611	23	–	10	.697
Evansville	5	–	13	.278	10	–	19	.345
Drake	5	–	13	.278	12	–	19	.387
Indiana State	4	–	14	.222	13	–	16	.448
Illinois State	4	–	14	.222	9	–	19	.321
† 2006 MVC tournament winner Rankings from AP Poll

The 2005–06 Northern Iowa Panthers men's basketball team represented the University of Northern Iowa during the 2005–06 NCAA Division I men's basketball season. The Panthers, led by fifth-year head coach Greg McDermott, played their home games at the UNI-Dome in Cedar Falls, Iowa and were members of the Missouri Valley Conference (The Valley). They finished the season 23–10, 11–7 in MVC play to finish in fifth place. They lost to Southern Illinois in the semifinals of the Missouri Valley tournament, but still received an at-large bid to the NCAA tournament where they were defeated by No. 7 seed Georgetown in the opening round.

== Roster ==
2005–06 Northern Iowa Panthers men's basketball team
Players
Coaches

Pos.	#	Name	Height	Weight	Year	Hometown
C	2	Eric Coleman	6 ft 6 in (1.98 m)	230 lb (104 kg)	So	Maplewood, MN
G	3	Michael Williams	5 ft 9 in (1.75 m)	175 lb (79 kg)	Jr	Topeka, KS
F	4	Evan Pedescleaux	6 ft 6 in (1.98 m)	275 lb (125 kg)	Fr	Plymouth, MN
G	10	Brian Haak	6 ft 0 in (1.83 m)	160 lb (73 kg)	Fr	Spencer, IA
G	11	John Little	6 ft 0 in (1.83 m)	195 lb (88 kg)	Sr	Peoria, IL
G	12	Ben Jacobson	6 ft 3 in (1.91 m)	205 lb (93 kg)	RS Sr	Sioux City, IA
G	13	Adam Viet	6 ft 3 in (1.91 m)	195 lb (88 kg)	So	Ackley, IA
G	14	Jared Josten	5 ft 11 in (1.8 m)	170 lb (77 kg)	So	Webster City, IA
G	15	Mason Stewart	6 ft 1 in (1.85 m)	175 lb (79 kg)	Fr	Aurora, IL
G	21	Travis Brown	6 ft 3 in (1.91 m)	175 lb (79 kg)	Fr	Richfield, MN
G	23	Brooks McKowen	6 ft 2 in (1.88 m)	195 lb (88 kg)	Jr	Fairbank, IA
F	32	Grant Stout	6 ft 8 in (2.03 m)	230 lb (104 kg)	Jr	New Sharon, IA
F	33	Tyler Griffin	6 ft 6 in (1.98 m)	210 lb (95 kg)	Jr	Greene, IA
F	41	Austin Howard	6 ft 6 in (1.98 m)	240 lb (109 kg)	Fr	Davenport, IA
C	51	Atila Santos	6 ft 10 in (2.08 m)	230 lb (104 kg)	So	Salvador, Brazil

Head coach

- Greg McDermott (Northern Iowa)

Assistant coach(es)

- Ben Jacobson (Northern Dakota)

Legend

- (C) Team captain
- (S) Suspended
- (I) Ineligible
- (W) Walk-on
- Injured
- Current redshirt

Roster

== Schedule and results ==
Date time, TV	Rank^{#}	Opponent^{#}	Result	Record	Site (attendance) city, state
Exhibition
Nov 6, 2005*; 5:05 p.m.		Lewis	W 77–50		UNI-Dome; Cedar Falls, Iowa
Nov 13, 2005*; 5:05 p.m.		Wayne State	W 74–57		UNI-Dome; Cedar Falls, Iowa
Non-conference regular season
Nov 20, 2005*; 6:30 p.m.		vs. Western Carolina	W 68–46	1–0	Wells Fargo Arena (8,640); Des Moines, Iowa
Nov 23, 2005*; 6:05 p.m.		at Western Michigan	W 69–63	2–0	University Arena (2,892); Kalamazoo, Michigan
Nov 27, 2005*; 5:05 p.m.		Upper Iowa	W 72–47	3–0	UNI-Dome (3,862); Cedar Falls, Iowa
Nov 29, 2005*; 7:05 p.m.		at Iowa State	L 61–68	3–1	Hilton Coliseum (12,528); Ames, Iowa
Dec 3, 2005*; 7:05 p.m.		Loyola–Chicago	W 72–56	4–1	UNI-Dome (3,584); Cedar Falls, Iowa
Dec 6, 2005*; 7:05 p.m.		No. 12 Iowa	W 67–63 ^{OT}	5–1	UNI-Dome (13,288); Cedar Falls, Iowa
Dec 10, 2005*; 7:05 p.m.		UMKC	W 87–64	6–1	UNI-Dome (5,219); Cedar Falls, Iowa
Dec 17, 2005*; 7:05 p.m.		Florida A&M	W 76–53	7–1	UNI-Dome (4,857); Cedar Falls, Iowa
Dec 19, 2005*; 7:05 p.m.		at LSU	W 54–50	8–1	Maravich Assembly Center (7,340); Baton Rouge, Louisiana
Dec 22, 2005*; 4:30 p.m.		vs. Hawaii Pacific	W 81–47	9–1	Valley High School (247); Las Vegas, Nevada
Dec 23, 2005*; 7:00 p.m.		vs. Dayton	W 74–67	10–1	Valley High School (1,000); Las Vegas, Nevada
Missouri Valley Conference Regular season
Dec 28, 2005; 7:05 p.m.		at Bradley	L 60–68 ^{OT}	10–2 (0–1)	Carver Arena (9,644); Peoria, Illinois
Dec 31, 2005; 4:05 p.m.		Evansville	W 71–60	11–2 (1–1)	UNI-Dome (4,219); Cedar Falls, Iowa
Jan 2, 2006; 7:05 p.m.		Illinois State	W 60–47	12–2 (2–1)	UNI-Dome (4,014); Cedar Falls, Iowa
Jan 5, 2006; 8:05 p.m.		at Wichita State	W 75–61	13–2 (3–1)	Charles Koch Arena (10,478); Wichita, Kansas
Jan 7, 2006; 7:05 p.m.		at Missouri State	W 72–62	14–2 (4–1)	Hammons Student Center (8,129); Springfield, Missouri
Jan 11, 2006; 7:05 p.m.		Creighton	L 52–55	14–3 (4–2)	UNI-Dome (8,612); Cedar Falls, Iowa
Jan 14, 2006; 4:05 p.m.		at Illinois State	W 67–52	15–3 (5–2)	Redbird Arena (5,336); Normal, Illinois
Jan 16, 2006; 7:05 p.m.		Southern Illinois	W 71–65 ^{2OT}	16–3 (6–2)	UNI-Dome (5,304); Cedar Falls, Iowa
Jan 21, 2006; 7:05 p.m.		Drake	W 91–72	17–3 (7–2)	UNI-Dome (9,323); Cedar Falls, Iowa
Jan 25, 2006; 7:05 p.m.		at Evansville	W 74–61	18–3 (8–2)	Roberts Municipal Stadium (4,568); Evansville, Indiana
Jan 28, 2006; 3:05 p.m.		at Drake	W 51–49	19–3 (9–2)	Knapp Center (6,567); Des Moines, Iowa
Jan 31, 2006; 8:05 p.m.		at Creighton	L 55–63	19–4 (9–3)	Qwest Center Omaha (14,878); Omaha, Nebraska
Feb 4, 2006; 3:05 p.m.		Indiana State	W 83–56	20–4 (10–3)	UNI-Dome (6,172); Cedar Falls, Iowa
Feb 7, 2006; 7:05 p.m.	No. 25	Wichita State	W 68–56	21–4 (11–3)	UNI-Dome (8,459); Cedar Falls, Iowa
Feb 11, 2006; 7:05 p.m.		Missouri State	L 63–66	21–5 (11–4)	UNI-Dome (10,053); Cedar Falls, Iowa
Feb 14, 2006; 6:05 p.m.		at Indiana State	L 60–61	21–6 (11–5)	Hulman Center (3,063); Terre Haute, Indiana
Feb 18, 2006*; 11:05 a.m., ESPN2		No. 24 Bucknell; ESPN BracketBusters	W 65–61 ^{2OT}	22–6	UNI-Dome (8,442); Cedar Falls, Iowa
Feb 22, 2006; 7:35 p.m.		Bradley	L 49–71	22–7 (11–6)	UNI-Dome (8,074); Cedar Falls, Iowa
Feb 25, 2006; 1:05 p.m.	No. 25	at Southern Illinois	L 45–46	22–8 (11–7)	SIU Arena (9,222); Carbondale, Illinois
Missouri Valley tournament
Mar 3, 2006*; 8:35 p.m.	(6)	vs. (3) Missouri State; Quarterfinals	W 57–42	23–8	Savvis Center (14,533); St. Louis, Missouri
Mar 4, 2006*; 4:05 p.m.	(6)	vs. (2) Southern Illinois; Semifinals	L 46–55 ^{OT}	23–9	Savvis Center (17,772); St. Louis, Missouri
NCAA tournament
Mar 17, 2006*; 2:45 p.m., CBS	(10 MW)	vs. (7 MW) No. 23 Georgetown; First round	L 49–54	23–10	University of Dayton Arena (12,945); Dayton, Ohio
*Non-conference game. ^{#}Rankings from AP Poll. (#) Tournament seedings in parentheses. MW=Midwest. All times are in Central Time.
