= 2006 Missouri Valley Conference men's basketball tournament =

- Classification: Division I
- Season: 2005–06
- Teams: 10
- Site: Scottrade Center; St. Louis, Missouri
- Champions: Southern Illinois (5th title)
- Winning coach: Chris Lowery (1st title)
- MVP: Randal Falker (Southern Illinois)

2005–06 Missouri Valley Conference men's basketball standings
	Conf.				Overall
Team	W		L	PCT	W		L	PCT
Wichita State	14	–	4	.778	26	–	9	.743
Southern Illinois †	12	–	6	.667	22	–	11	.667
Missouri State	12	–	6	.667	22	–	9	.710
Creighton	12	–	6	.667	20	–	10	.667
Bradley	11	–	7	.611	22	–	11	.667
Northern Iowa	11	–	7	.611	23	–	10	.697
Evansville	5	–	13	.278	10	–	19	.345
Drake	5	–	13	.278	12	–	19	.387
Indiana State	4	–	14	.222	13	–	16	.448
Illinois State	4	–	14	.222	9	–	19	.321
† 2006 MVC tournament winner Rankings from AP Poll

The 2006 Missouri Valley Conference men's basketball tournament was played from March 2-5, 2006 at the Savvis Center in St. Louis, Missouri at the conclusion of the 2005–06 NCAA Division I men's basketball regular season. The Southern Illinois Salukis won their 5th MVC tournament title to earn an automatic bid to the 2006 NCAA tournament.

== Tournament Bracket ==
Opening Round; Thursday, March 2
8	Drake	63
9	Indiana State	72
7	Evansville	52
10	Illinois State	45

Quarterfinals; Friday, March 3
1	Wichita State	81
9	Indiana State	63
4	Creighton	47
5	Bradley	54
2	Southern Illinois	71
7	Evansville	55
3	Missouri State	42
6	Northern Iowa	57

Semifinals; Saturday, March 4
1	Wichita State	52
5	Bradley	60
2	Southern Illinois	55
6	Northern Iowa	46

Final; Sunday, March 5
5	Bradley	46
2	Southern Illinois	59

== See also ==
- Missouri Valley Conference
