= 2005–06 NCAA Division I men's basketball season =

Basketball season

- Preseason AP No. 1: Duke Blue Devils
- Regular season: November 6, 2005– March 14, 2006
- NCAA Tournament: 2006
- Tournament dates: March 14 – April 3, 2006
- National Championship: RCA Dome; Indianapolis, Indiana
- NCAA Champions: Florida Gators
- Other champions: South Carolina Gamecocks (NIT)
- Player of the Year (Naismith, Wooden): JJ Redick, Duke Blue Devils

The 2005–06 NCAA Division I men's basketball season began on November 6, 2005, progressed through the regular season and conference tournaments and concluded with the 2006 NCAA Division I men's basketball tournament championship game on April 3, 2006, at the RCA Dome in Indianapolis, Indiana. The Florida Gators won their first NCAA national championship with a 73–57 victory over the UCLA Bruins. This was the last Final Four at the RCA Dome, as it was demolished in 2008. The Final Four will return to the city of Indianapolis, but will be held at Lucas Oil Stadium.

== Season headlines ==
- Prior to the season, the NCAA purchased the National Invitation Tournament (NIT) from the Metropolitan Intercollegiate Basketball Association (MIBA). The NCAA took over operation of the NIT beginning in 2006, and MIBA, which had owned and operated the tournament for its first 68 years, was dissolved.
- Prior to the season, a major realignment of teams in the Big East Conference and Atlantic Coast Conference (ACC) sent shock waves across college basketball:
  - Boston College, which had become a charter member of the Big East in the 1979–80 season, followed Virginia Tech and Miami (who had moved the year before) from the Big East to the ACC.
  - The Big East brought in five teams from Conference USA (C-USA) —Cincinnati, DePaul, Louisville, Marquette, and South Florida. **To replace the teams that defected to the Big East (as well as TCU, which left C-USA for the Mountain West Conference and Charlotte and Saint Louis, who left for the Atlantic 10 Conference), Conference USA brought in six new members: Rice, SMU, Tulsa, and UTEP from the Western Athletic Conference; Marshall from the Mid-American Conference, and Central Florida from the Atlantic Sun Conference.
  - The Western Athletic Conference (WAC) added New Mexico State (from the Sun Belt Conference) and Idaho and Utah State (both from the Big West Conference).
  - East Tennessee State moved from the Southern Conference to the Atlantic Sun Conference.
  - The Colonial Athletic Association added Northeastern from the America East Conference and Georgia State from the Atlantic Sun Conference.
  - Troy moved from the Atlantic Sun Conference to the Sun Belt Conference.
- The preseason AP All-American team was named on November 8. JJ Redick of Duke was the leading vote-getter (67 of 72 votes). The rest of the team included Shelden Williams of Duke (63 votes), Dee Brown of Illinois (51), Adam Morrison of Gonzaga (45) and Craig Smith of Boston College (31).
- On February 1, 2006, the Rating Percentage Index (RPI) became available to the public for the first time, appearing on the NCAA Web site.
- JJ Redick of Duke and Adam Morrison of Gonzaga engaged in a year-long battle for the national scoring title and Player of the Year honors. Morrison won the scoring race, edging Redick by 1.3 points per game. However, Redick won most National POY Awards, though in 2006 he and Morrison became the first co-winners of the Oscar Robertson Trophy.
- Paul Millsap of Louisiana Tech became the first player ever to lead the nation in rebounding for three consecutive years.
- In the 2006 NCAA tournament, George Mason made an improbable run to the Final Four, becoming the first true mid-major to do so since Penn in 1979. The Patriots' path was not easy, as they defeated schools that had won three of the past six titles—national powers Michigan State, North Carolina, and Connecticut—en route to its first Final Four berth.
- Florida won its first national title in basketball, defeating UCLA in the NCAA tournament's championship game 73–57. The team was led by a group of sophomores, several of whom were the offspring of retired professional athletes, nicknamed "The Oh-fours". Forward Al Horford and guard Taurean Green were the sons of former NBA players (Tito Horford and Sidney Green, respectively), while center and Final Four MOP Joakim Noah was the son of retired tennis pro Yannick Noah. These three (along with fellow sophomore star Corey Brewer) surprised many by choosing not to enter the 2006 NBA draft, but instead returning to try to repeat as champions in the 2006–07 season.

== Season outlook ==
=== Pre-season polls ===
The top 25 from the AP and ESPN/USA Today Coaches Polls November 7, 2005.

'Associated Press'
| Ranking | Team |
|---|---|
| 1 | Duke (61) |
| 2 | Texas (6) |
| 3 | Connecticut |
| 4 | Michigan State (4) |
| 5 | Villanova (1) |
| 6 | Oklahoma |
| 7 | Louisville |
| 8 | Gonzaga |
| 9 | Kentucky |
| 10 | Arizona |
| 11 | Boston College |
| 12 | Memphis |
| 13 | Stanford |
| 14 | West Virginia |
| 15 | Alabama |
| 16 | Syracuse |
| 17 | Illinois |
| 18 | Wake Forest |
| 19 | UCLA |
| 20 | Iowa |
| 21 | George Washington |
| 22 | Nevada |
| 23 | Indiana |
| 24 | Maryland |
| 25 | Iowa State |

ESPN/USA Today coaches
| Ranking | Team |
|---|---|
| 1 | Duke (28) |
| 2 | Connecticut |
| 3 | Texas (2) |
| 4 | Villanova (1) |
| 5 | Michigan State |
| 6 | Oklahoma |
| 7 | Gonzaga |
| 8 | Louisville |
| 9 | Arizona |
| 10 | Kentucky |
| 11 | Boston College |
| 12 | Memphis |
| 13 | Stanford |
| 14 | Alabama |
| 15 | West Virginia |
| 16 | Syracuse |
| 17 | Illinois |
| 18 | UCLA |
| 18 | Wake Forest |
| 20 | Iowa |
| 21 | Maryland |
| 22 | Indiana |
| 23 | Iowa State |
| 24 | George Washington |
| 25 | Nevada |

== Conference membership changes ==
These schools joined new conferences for the 2005–06 season.

| School | Former conference | New conference |
|---|---|---|
| Boston College Eagles | Big East Conference | Atlantic Coast Conference |
| Central Florida Knights | Atlantic Sun Conference | Conference USA |
| Charlotte 49ers | Conference USA | Atlantic 10 Conference |
| Cincinnati Bearcats | Conference USA | Big East Conference |
| DePaul Blue Demons | Conference USA | Big East Conference |
| East Tennessee State Buccaneers | Southern Conference | Atlantic Sun Conference |
| Georgia State Panthers | Atlantic Sun Conference | Colonial Athletic Association |
| Idaho Vandals | Big West Conference | Western Athletic Conference |
| Kennesaw State Owls | Peach Belt Conference (D-II) | Atlantic Sun Conference |
| Louisville Cardinals | Conference USA | Big East Conference |
| Marquette Golden Eagles | Conference USA | Big East Conference |
| Marshall Thundering Herd | Mid-American Conference | Conference USA |
| New Mexico State Aggies | Sun Belt Conference | Western Athletic Conference |
| North Florida Ospreys | Peach Belt Conference (D-II) | Atlantic Sun Conference |
| Northeastern Huskies | America East Conference | Colonial Athletic Association |
| Rice Owls | Western Athletic Conference | Conference USA |
| Saint Louis Billikens | Conference USA | Atlantic 10 Conference |
| South Florida Bulls | Conference USA | Big East Conference |
| SMU Mustangs | Western Athletic Conference | Conference USA |
| TCU Horned Frogs | Conference USA | Mountain West Conference |
| Texas–El Paso (UTEP) Miners | Western Athletic Conference | Conference USA |
| Troy Trojans | Atlantic Sun Conference | Sun Belt Conference |
| Tulsa Golden Hurricane | Western Athletic Conference | Conference USA |
| Utah State Aggies | Big West Conference | Western Athletic Conference |

== Regular season ==
=== Conferences ===
==== Conference winners and tournaments ====
Thirty conference seasons concluded with a single-elimination tournament. Generally, all member schools were eligible to participate in their conference tournament regardless of their records, but the Big East did not invite its teams with the worst records to its 2006 tournament. Conference tournament winners received an automatic bid to the 2006 NCAA Division I men's basketball tournament, while a school that won its conference regular season title but did not win its conference tournament was guaranteed a bid to the 2006 National Invitation Tournament unless it received an at-large bid to the NCAA tournament. The Ivy League was the only NCAA Division I conference that did not hold a conference tournament, instead sending its regular-season champion to the NCAA tournament.

| Conference | Regular Season Winner | Conference Player of the Year | Conference Tournament | Tournament Venue (City) | Tournament winner |
|---|---|---|---|---|---|
| America East Conference | Albany | Jamar Wilson, Albany | 2006 America East men's basketball tournament | Events Center (Vestal, New York) (Except Finals) | Albany |
| Atlantic 10 Conference | George Washington | Steven Smith, La Salle | 2006 Atlantic 10 men's basketball tournament | U.S. Bank Arena (Cincinnati) | Xavier |
| Atlantic Coast Conference | Duke | JJ Redick, Duke | 2006 ACC men's basketball tournament | Greensboro Coliseum (Greensboro, North Carolina) | Duke |
| Atlantic Sun Conference | Lipscomb & Belmont | Tim Smith, East Tennessee State | 2006 Atlantic Sun men's basketball tournament | Memorial Center (Johnson City, Tennessee) | Belmont |
| Big 12 Conference | Texas & Kansas | P. J. Tucker, Texas | 2006 Big 12 men's basketball tournament | American Airlines Center (Dallas, Texas) | Kansas |
| Big East Conference | Connecticut & Villanova | Randy Foye, Villanova | 2006 Big East men's basketball tournament | Madison Square Garden (New York City) | Syracuse |
| Big Sky Conference | Northern Arizona | Rodney Stuckey, Eastern Washington | 2006 Big Sky men's basketball tournament | Walkup Skydome (Flagstaff, Arizona) (Semifinals and Finals) | Montana |
| Big South Conference | Winthrop | Jack Leasure, Coastal Carolina | 2006 Big South Conference men's basketball tournament | Winthrop Coliseum (Rock Hill, South Carolina) (Semifinals and Finals) | Winthrop |
| Big Ten Conference | Ohio State | Terence Dials, Ohio State | 2006 Big Ten Conference men's basketball tournament | Conseco Fieldhouse (Indianapolis, Indiana) | Iowa |
| Big West Conference | Pacific | Christian Maraker, Pacific | 2006 Big West Conference men's basketball tournament | Anaheim Convention Center (Anaheim, California) | Pacific |
| Colonial Athletic Association | UNC Wilmington & George Mason | José Juan Barea, Northeastern | 2006 CAA men's basketball tournament | Richmond Coliseum (Richmond, Virginia) | UNC Wilmington |
| Conference USA | Memphis | Rodney Carney, Memphis | 2006 Conference USA men's basketball tournament | FedExForum (Memphis, Tennessee) | Memphis |
| Horizon League | Wisconsin-Milwaukee | Brandon Polk, Butler | 2006 Horizon League men's basketball tournament | U.S. Cellular Arena (Milwaukee, Wisconsin) (Except First Round) | Wisconsin-Milwaukee |
| Ivy League | Penn | Ibrahim Jaaber, Penn | No Tournament | | |
| Metro Atlantic Athletic Conference | Manhattan | Keydren Clark, St. Peter's | 2006 MAAC men's basketball tournament | Pepsi Arena (Albany, New York) | Iona |
| Mid-American Conference | Kent State (East); Northern Illinois (West) | DeAndre Haynes, Kent State | 2006 MAC men's basketball tournament | Quicken Loans Arena (Cleveland, Ohio) | Kent State |
| Mid-Continent Conference | Oral Roberts & IUPUI | Caleb Green, Oral Roberts | 2006 Mid-Continent Conference men's basketball tournament | John Q. Hammons Arena (Tulsa, Oklahoma) | Oral Roberts |
| Mid-Eastern Athletic Conference | Delaware State | Jahsha Bluntt, Delaware State | 2006 Mid-Eastern Athletic Conference men's basketball tournament | RBC Center (Raleigh, North Carolina) | Hampton |
| Missouri Valley Conference | Wichita State | Paul Miller, Wichita State | 2006 Missouri Valley Conference men's basketball tournament | Savvis Center (St. Louis, Missouri) | Southern Illinois |
| Mountain West Conference | San Diego State | Brandon Heath, San Diego State | 2006 MWC men's basketball tournament | Pepsi Center (Denver, Colorado) | San Diego State |
| Northeast Conference | Fairleigh Dickinson | Chad Timberlake, Fairleigh Dickinson | 2006 Northeast Conference men's basketball tournament | Campus Sites | Monmouth |
| Ohio Valley Conference | Murray State | J. Robert Merritt, Samford | 2006 Ohio Valley Conference men's basketball tournament | Gaylord Entertainment Center (Nashville, Tennessee) (Semifinals and Finals) | Murray State |
| Pacific-10 Conference | UCLA | Brandon Roy, Washington | 2006 Pacific-10 Conference men's basketball tournament | Staples Center (Los Angeles) | UCLA |
| Patriot League | Bucknell | Charles Lee, Bucknell | 2006 Patriot League men's basketball tournament | Campus Sites | Bucknell |
| Southeastern Conference | Tennessee (East); LSU (West) | Glen Davis, LSU | 2006 SEC men's basketball tournament | Gaylord Entertainment Center (Nashville, Tennessee) | Florida |
| Southern Conference | Elon (North); Georgia Southern (South) | Elton Nesbitt, Georgia Southern | 2006 Southern Conference men's basketball tournament | North Charleston Coliseum (North Charleston, South Carolina) | Davidson |
| Southland Conference | Northwestern State | Ricky Woods, Southeastern Louisiana | 2006 Southland Conference men's basketball tournament | Prather Coliseum (Natchitoches, Louisiana) (Finals) | Northwestern State |
| Southwestern Athletic Conference | Southern | Brion Rush, Grambling State | 2006 Southwestern Athletic Conference men's basketball tournament | Birmingham Jefferson Convention Complex (Birmingham, Alabama) | Southern |
| Sun Belt Conference | Western Kentucky (East); South Alabama (West) | Anthony Winchester, Western Kentucky | 2006 Sun Belt men's basketball tournament | Murphy Center (Murfreesboro, Tennessee) | South Alabama |
| West Coast Conference | Gonzaga | Adam Morrison, Gonzaga | 2006 West Coast Conference men's basketball tournament | McCarthey Athletic Center (Spokane, Washington) | Gonzaga |
| Western Athletic Conference | Nevada | Nick Fazekas, Nevada | 2006 WAC men's basketball tournament | Lawlor Events Center (Reno, Nevada) | Nevada |

==== Conference standings ====
2005–06 America East men's basketball standings
| | Conf. | | | | Overall |
| Team | W | | L | PCT | W | | L | PCT |
|---|---|---|---|---|---|---|---|---|
| Albany † | 13 | – | 3 | .813 | 21 | – | 11 | .656 |
| Binghamton | 12 | – | 4 | .750 | 16 | – | 13 | .552 |
| Boston University | 9 | – | 7 | .563 | 12 | – | 16 | .429 |
| Hartford | 9 | – | 7 | .563 | 13 | – | 15 | .464 |
| New Hampshire | 8 | – | 8 | .500 | 12 | – | 17 | .414 |
| Vermont | 7 | – | 9 | .438 | 13 | – | 17 | .433 |
| Maine | 7 | – | 9 | .438 | 12 | – | 16 | .429 |
| UMBC | 5 | – | 11 | .313 | 10 | – | 19 | .345 |
| Stony Brook | 2 | – | 14 | .125 | 4 | – | 24 | .143 |
† 2006 America East tournament winner As of March 14, 2006; Rankings from AP Poll

2005–06 Atlantic 10 men's basketball standings
| | Conf. | | | | Overall |
| Team | W | | L | PCT | W | | L | PCT |
|---|---|---|---|---|---|---|---|---|
| No. 14 George Washington | 16 | – | 0 | 1.000 | 27 | – | 3 | .900 |
| Charlotte | 11 | – | 5 | .688 | 19 | – | 13 | .594 |
| La Salle | 10 | – | 6 | .625 | 18 | – | 10 | .643 |
| Saint Louis | 10 | – | 6 | .625 | 16 | – | 13 | .552 |
| Saint Joseph's | 9 | – | 7 | .563 | 19 | – | 14 | .576 |
| Fordham | 9 | – | 7 | .563 | 16 | – | 16 | .500 |
| Xavier † | 8 | – | 8 | .500 | 21 | – | 11 | .656 |
| Temple | 8 | – | 8 | .500 | 17 | – | 15 | .531 |
| Rhode Island | 8 | – | 8 | .500 | 14 | – | 14 | .500 |
| UMass | 8 | – | 8 | .500 | 13 | – | 15 | .464 |
| Dayton | 6 | – | 10 | .375 | 14 | – | 17 | .452 |
| Richmond | 6 | – | 10 | .375 | 13 | – | 17 | .433 |
| St. Bonaventure | 2 | – | 14 | .125 | 8 | – | 19 | .296 |
| Duquesne | 1 | – | 15 | .063 | 3 | – | 24 | .111 |
† 2006 Atlantic 10 Tournament winner Rankings from AP Poll

2005–06 ACC men's basketball standings
| | Conf. | | | | Overall |
| Team | W | | L | PCT | W | | L | PCT |
|---|---|---|---|---|---|---|---|---|
| No. 1 Duke† | 14 | – | 2 | .875 | 32 | – | 4 | .889 |
| No. 10 North Carolina | 12 | – | 4 | .750 | 23 | – | 8 | .742 |
| No. 7 Boston College | 11 | – | 5 | .688 | 28 | – | 8 | .778 |
| NC State | 10 | – | 6 | .625 | 22 | – | 10 | .688 |
| Florida State | 9 | – | 7 | .563 | 20 | – | 10 | .667 |
| Maryland | 8 | – | 8 | .500 | 19 | – | 13 | .594 |
| Virginia | 7 | – | 9 | .438 | 15 | – | 15 | .500 |
| Miami (FL) | 7 | – | 9 | .438 | 18 | – | 16 | .529 |
| Clemson | 7 | – | 9 | .438 | 19 | – | 13 | .594 |
| Virginia Tech | 4 | – | 12 | .250 | 14 | – | 16 | .467 |
| Georgia Tech | 4 | – | 12 | .250 | 11 | – | 17 | .393 |
| Wake Forest | 3 | – | 13 | .188 | 17 | – | 17 | .500 |
† 2006 ACC tournament winner Rankings from AP Poll

2005–06 Atlantic Sun men's basketball standings
| | Conf. | | | | Overall |
| Team | W | | L | PCT | W | | L | PCT |
|---|---|---|---|---|---|---|---|---|
| Lipscomb | 15 | – | 5 | .750 | 21 | – | 11 | .656 |
| Belmont † | 15 | – | 5 | .750 | 20 | – | 11 | .645 |
| Florida Atlantic | 14 | – | 6 | .700 | 15 | – | 13 | .536 |
| Gardner–Webb | 13 | – | 7 | .650 | 17 | – | 12 | .586 |
| East Tennessee State | 12 | – | 8 | .600 | 15 | – | 13 | .536 |
| Stetson | 11 | – | 9 | .550 | 14 | – | 18 | .438 |
| Kennesaw State | 10 | – | 10 | .500 | 12 | – | 17 | .414 |
| Campbell | 9 | – | 11 | .450 | 10 | – | 18 | .357 |
| Mercer | 7 | – | 13 | .350 | 9 | – | 19 | .321 |
| North Florida | 3 | – | 17 | .150 | 6 | – | 22 | .214 |
| Jacksonville | 1 | – | 19 | .050 | 1 | – | 26 | .037 |
† 2006 Atlantic Sun Tournament winner As of March 7, 2006; Rankings from AP Poll

2005–06 Big East men's basketball standings
| | Conf. | | | | Overall |
| Team | W | | L | PCT | W | | L | PCT |
|---|---|---|---|---|---|---|---|---|
| No. 2 Connecticut | 14 | – | 2 | .875 | 30 | – | 4 | .882 |
| No. 3 Villanova | 14 | – | 2 | .875 | 28 | – | 5 | .848 |
| No. 22 West Virginia | 11 | – | 5 | .688 | 22 | – | 11 | .667 |
| Marquette | 10 | – | 6 | .625 | 20 | – | 11 | .645 |
| No. 23 Georgetown | 10 | – | 6 | .625 | 23 | – | 10 | .697 |
| No. 16 Pittsburgh | 10 | – | 6 | .625 | 25 | – | 8 | .758 |
| Seton Hall | 9 | – | 7 | .563 | 18 | – | 12 | .600 |
| Cincinnati | 8 | – | 8 | .500 | 21 | – | 13 | .618 |
| Rutgers | 7 | – | 9 | .438 | 19 | – | 14 | .576 |
| Louisville | 6 | – | 10 | .375 | 21 | – | 13 | .618 |
| Notre Dame | 6 | – | 10 | .375 | 16 | – | 14 | .533 |
| DePaul* | 5 | – | 11 | .313 | 12 | – | 15 | .444 |
| Providence* | 5 | – | 11 | .313 | 12 | – | 15 | .444 |
| St. John's* | 5 | – | 11 | .313 | 12 | – | 15 | .444 |
| South Florida* | 1 | – | 15 | .063 | 7 | – | 22 | .241 |
| No. 21 Syracuse†# | 0 | – | 9 | .000 | 0 | – | 12 | .000 |
† 2006 Big East tournament winner As of April 3, 2006; Rankings from AP Poll; *Did not qualify for 2006 Big East tournament. #Syracuse had all its wins vacated due to sanctions against the program; Syracuse′s disputed record was 23–12, 7–9.

2005–06 Big Sky men's basketball standings
| | Conf. | | | | Overall |
| Team | W | | L | PCT | W | | L | PCT |
|---|---|---|---|---|---|---|---|---|
| Northern Arizona | 12 | – | 2 | .857 | 21 | – | 11 | .656 |
| Montana † | 10 | – | 4 | .714 | 24 | – | 7 | .774 |
| Eastern Washington | 9 | – | 5 | .643 | 15 | – | 15 | .500 |
| Montana State | 7 | – | 7 | .500 | 15 | – | 15 | .500 |
| Sacramento State | 5 | – | 9 | .357 | 15 | – | 15 | .500 |
| Portland State | 5 | – | 9 | .357 | 12 | – | 16 | .429 |
| Idaho State | 4 | – | 10 | .286 | 13 | – | 14 | .481 |
| Weber State | 4 | – | 10 | .286 | 10 | – | 17 | .370 |
† Conference tournament winner

2005–06 Big South Conference men's basketball standings
| | Conf. | | | | Overall |
| Team | W | | L | PCT | W | | L | PCT |
|---|---|---|---|---|---|---|---|---|
| Winthrop † | 13 | – | 3 | .813 | 23 | – | 8 | .742 |
| Birmingham–Southern | 12 | – | 4 | .750 | 19 | – | 9 | .679 |
| Coastal Carolina | 12 | – | 4 | .750 | 20 | – | 10 | .667 |
| Radford | 9 | – | 7 | .563 | 16 | – | 13 | .552 |
| High Point | 8 | – | 8 | .500 | 16 | – | 13 | .552 |
| Charleston Southern | 7 | – | 9 | .438 | 13 | – | 16 | .448 |
| UNC Asheville | 6 | – | 10 | .375 | 9 | – | 19 | .321 |
| Liberty | 3 | – | 13 | .188 | 7 | – | 23 | .233 |
| VMI | 2 | – | 14 | .125 | 7 | – | 20 | .259 |
† 2006 Big South tournament winner Rankings from AP Poll

2005–06 Big Ten Conference men's basketball standings
| | Conf. | | | | Overall |
| Team | W | | L | PCT | W | | L | PCT |
|---|---|---|---|---|---|---|---|---|
| No. 6 Ohio State | 12 | – | 4 | .750 | 26 | – | 6 | .813 |
| No. 15 Iowa † | 11 | – | 5 | .688 | 25 | – | 9 | .735 |
| No. 13 Illinois | 11 | – | 5 | .688 | 26 | – | 7 | .788 |
| Wisconsin | 9 | – | 7 | .563 | 19 | – | 12 | .613 |
| Indiana | 9 | – | 7 | .563 | 19 | – | 12 | .613 |
| Michigan State | 8 | – | 8 | .500 | 22 | – | 12 | .647 |
| Michigan | 8 | – | 8 | .500 | 22 | – | 11 | .667 |
| Penn State | 6 | – | 10 | .375 | 15 | – | 15 | .500 |
| Northwestern | 6 | – | 10 | .375 | 14 | – | 15 | .483 |
| Minnesota | 5 | – | 11 | .313 | 16 | – | 15 | .516 |
| Purdue | 3 | – | 13 | .188 | 9 | – | 19 | .321 |
† 2006 Big Ten tournament winner As of March 14, 2006; Rankings from AP Poll

2005–06 Big 12 men's basketball standings
| | Conf. | | | | Overall |
| Team | W | | L | PCT | W | | L | PCT |
|---|---|---|---|---|---|---|---|---|
| No. 9 Texas | 13 | – | 3 | .813 | 30 | – | 7 | .811 |
| No. 12 Kansas † | 13 | – | 3 | .813 | 25 | – | 8 | .758 |
| No. 24 Oklahoma | 11 | – | 5 | .688 | 20 | – | 9 | .690 |
| Texas A&M | 10 | – | 6 | .625 | 22 | – | 9 | .710 |
| Colorado | 9 | – | 7 | .563 | 20 | – | 10 | .667 |
| Nebraska | 7 | – | 9 | .438 | 19 | – | 14 | .576 |
| Oklahoma State | 6 | – | 10 | .375 | 17 | – | 16 | .515 |
| Texas Tech | 6 | – | 10 | .375 | 15 | – | 17 | .469 |
| Kansas State | 6 | – | 10 | .375 | 15 | – | 13 | .536 |
| Iowa State | 6 | – | 10 | .375 | 16 | – | 14 | .533 |
| Missouri | 5 | – | 11 | .313 | 12 | – | 16 | .429 |
| Baylor | 4 | – | 12 | .250 | 4 | – | 13 | .235 |
† 2006 Big 12 Tournament winner Rankings from AP poll

2005–06 Big West men's basketball standings
| | Conf. | | | | Overall |
| Team | W | | L | PCT | W | | L | PCT |
|---|---|---|---|---|---|---|---|---|
| Pacific † | 12 | – | 2 | .857 | 24 | – | 8 | .750 |
| UC Irvine | 10 | – | 4 | .714 | 16 | – | 13 | .552 |
| Cal Poly | 7 | – | 7 | .500 | 10 | – | 19 | .345 |
| UC Santa Barbara | 6 | – | 8 | .429 | 15 | – | 14 | .517 |
| Cal State Fullerton | 5 | – | 9 | .357 | 16 | – | 13 | .552 |
| Cal State Northridge | 4 | – | 10 | .286 | 11 | – | 17 | .393 |
| UC Riverside | 3 | – | 11 | .214 | 5 | – | 23 | .179 |
| *Long Beach State | 0 | – | 5 | .000 | 0 | – | 12 | .000 |
† 2006 Big West tournament winner As of April 10, 2006; *Long Beach State: 18 wins vacated due to sanctions against the program; Disputed record: Long Beach State–(18–12)(9–5); Rankings from AP poll

2005–06 CAA men's basketball standings
| | Conf. | | | | Overall |
| Team | W | | L | PCT | W | | L | PCT |
|---|---|---|---|---|---|---|---|---|
| George Mason | 15 | – | 3 | .833 | 27 | – | 8 | .771 |
| UNC Wilmington † | 15 | – | 3 | .833 | 25 | – | 8 | .758 |
| Hofstra | 14 | – | 4 | .778 | 26 | – | 7 | .788 |
| Old Dominion | 13 | – | 5 | .722 | 24 | – | 10 | .706 |
| Northeastern | 12 | – | 6 | .667 | 19 | – | 11 | .633 |
| VCU | 11 | – | 7 | .611 | 19 | – | 10 | .655 |
| Drexel | 8 | – | 10 | .444 | 15 | – | 16 | .484 |
| Towson | 8 | – | 10 | .444 | 12 | – | 16 | .429 |
| Delaware | 4 | – | 14 | .222 | 9 | – | 21 | .300 |
| Georgia State | 3 | – | 15 | .167 | 7 | – | 22 | .241 |
| William & Mary | 3 | – | 15 | .167 | 8 | – | 20 | .286 |
| James Madison | 2 | – | 16 | .111 | 5 | – | 23 | .179 |
† 2006 CAA tournament winner Rankings from AP poll

2005–06 Conference USA men's basketball standings
| | Conf. | | | | Overall |
| Team | W | | L | PCT | W | | L | PCT |
|---|---|---|---|---|---|---|---|---|
| No. 4 Memphis† | 13 | – | 1 | .929 | 33 | – | 4 | .892 |
| No. 25 UAB | 12 | – | 2 | .857 | 24 | – | 7 | .774 |
| UTEP | 11 | – | 3 | .786 | 21 | – | 10 | .677 |
| Houston | 9 | – | 5 | .643 | 21 | – | 10 | .677 |
| UCF | 7 | – | 7 | .500 | 14 | – | 15 | .483 |
| Rice | 6 | – | 8 | .429 | 12 | – | 16 | .429 |
| Tulane | 6 | – | 8 | .429 | 12 | – | 17 | .414 |
| Tulsa | 6 | – | 8 | .429 | 11 | – | 17 | .393 |
| Marshall | 5 | – | 9 | .357 | 12 | – | 16 | .429 |
| SMU | 4 | – | 10 | .286 | 13 | – | 16 | .448 |
| Southern Miss | 3 | – | 11 | .214 | 10 | – | 21 | .323 |
| East Carolina | 2 | – | 12 | .143 | 8 | – | 20 | .286 |
† 2006 C-USA Tournament winner Rankings from AP Poll

2005–06 Horizon League men's basketball standings
| | Conf. | | | | Overall |
| Team | W | | L | PCT | W | | L | PCT |
|---|---|---|---|---|---|---|---|---|
| Milwaukee † | 12 | – | 4 | .750 | 22 | – | 9 | .710 |
| Butler | 11 | – | 5 | .688 | 20 | – | 13 | .606 |
| Loyola (IL) | 8 | – | 8 | .500 | 19 | – | 11 | .633 |
| UIC | 8 | – | 8 | .500 | 16 | – | 15 | .516 |
| Detroit | 8 | – | 8 | .500 | 16 | – | 16 | .500 |
| Green Bay | 8 | – | 8 | .500 | 15 | – | 16 | .484 |
| Wright State | 8 | – | 8 | .500 | 13 | – | 15 | .464 |
| Cleveland State | 5 | – | 11 | .313 | 10 | – | 18 | .357 |
| Youngstown State | 4 | – | 12 | .250 | 7 | – | 21 | .250 |
† 2006 Horizon League Tournament winner As of August 1, 2010; Rankings from AP Poll

2005–06 Ivy League men's basketball standings
| | Conf. | | | | Overall |
| Team | W | | L | PCT | W | | L | PCT |
|---|---|---|---|---|---|---|---|---|
| Penn | 12 | – | 2 | .857 | 20 | – | 8 | .714 |
| Princeton | 10 | – | 4 | .714 | 12 | – | 15 | .444 |
| Cornell | 8 | – | 6 | .571 | 13 | – | 15 | .464 |
| Yale | 7 | – | 7 | .500 | 15 | – | 14 | .517 |
| Brown | 6 | – | 8 | .429 | 10 | – | 17 | .370 |
| Harvard | 5 | – | 9 | .357 | 13 | – | 14 | .481 |
| Columbia | 4 | – | 10 | .286 | 11 | – | 16 | .407 |
| Dartmouth | 4 | – | 10 | .286 | 6 | – | 21 | .222 |

2005–06 MAAC men's basketball standings
| | Conf. | | | | Overall |
| Team | W | | L | PCT | W | | L | PCT |
|---|---|---|---|---|---|---|---|---|
| Manhattan | 14 | – | 4 | .778 | 20 | – | 11 | .645 |
| Iona † | 13 | – | 5 | .722 | 23 | – | 8 | .742 |
| Marist | 12 | – | 6 | .667 | 19 | – | 10 | .655 |
| Siena | 10 | – | 8 | .556 | 15 | – | 13 | .536 |
| Saint Peter's | 9 | – | 9 | .500 | 17 | – | 15 | .531 |
| Loyola (MD) | 8 | – | 10 | .444 | 15 | – | 13 | .536 |
| Niagara | 7 | – | 11 | .389 | 11 | – | 18 | .379 |
| Fairfield | 7 | – | 11 | .389 | 9 | – | 19 | .321 |
| Canisius | 6 | – | 12 | .333 | 9 | – | 20 | .310 |
| Rider | 4 | – | 14 | .222 | 8 | – | 20 | .286 |
† 2006 MAAC tournament winner Rankings from AP Poll

2005–06 Mid-American Conference men's basketball standings
| | Conf. | | | | Overall |
| Team | W | | L | PCT | W | | L | PCT |
|---|---|---|---|---|---|---|---|---|
East
| Kent State † | 15 | – | 3 | .833 | 24 | – | 8 | .750 |
| Akron | 14 | – | 4 | .778 | 23 | – | 9 | .719 |
| Miami (OH) | 14 | – | 4 | .778 | 18 | – | 12 | .600 |
| Ohio | 10 | – | 8 | .556 | 19 | – | 11 | .633 |
| Buffalo | 8 | – | 10 | .444 | 19 | – | 13 | .594 |
| Bowling Green | 5 | – | 13 | .278 | 9 | – | 21 | .300 |
West
| Northern Illinois | 12 | – | 6 | .667 | 17 | – | 11 | .607 |
| Toledo | 10 | – | 8 | .556 | 20 | – | 10 | .667 |
| Western Michigan | 10 | – | 8 | .556 | 14 | – | 17 | .452 |
| Ball State | 6 | – | 12 | .333 | 10 | – | 18 | .357 |
| Eastern Michigan | 3 | – | 15 | .167 | 7 | – | 21 | .250 |
| Central Michigan | 1 | – | 17 | .056 | 4 | – | 24 | .143 |
† 2006 MAC tournament winner Rankings from AP Poll

2005–06 Mid-Continent Conference men's basketball standings
| | Conf. | | | | Overall |
| Team | W | | L | PCT | W | | L | PCT |
|---|---|---|---|---|---|---|---|---|
| Oral Roberts † | 13 | – | 3 | .813 | 21 | – | 12 | .636 |
| IUPUI | 13 | – | 3 | .813 | 19 | – | 10 | .655 |
| UMKC | 11 | – | 5 | .688 | 14 | – | 14 | .500 |
| Valparaiso | 8 | – | 8 | .500 | 17 | – | 12 | .586 |
| Southern Utah | 8 | – | 8 | .500 | 10 | – | 20 | .333 |
| Chicago State | 8 | – | 8 | .500 | 11 | – | 19 | .367 |
| Oakland | 6 | – | 10 | .375 | 11 | – | 18 | .379 |
| Western Illinois | 3 | – | 13 | .188 | 7 | – | 21 | .250 |
| Centenary | 2 | – | 14 | .125 | 4 | – | 23 | .148 |
† 2006 Mid-Continent Tournament winner Rankings from AP Poll

2005–06 MEAC men's basketball standings
| | Conf. | | | | Overall |
| Team | W | | L | PCT | W | | L | PCT |
|---|---|---|---|---|---|---|---|---|
| Delaware State | 16 | – | 2 | .889 | 21 | – | 14 | .600 |
| Coppin State | 12 | – | 6 | .667 | 12 | – | 18 | .400 |
| Bethune–Cookman | 11 | – | 7 | .611 | 15 | – | 15 | .500 |
| South Carolina State | 11 | – | 7 | .611 | 14 | – | 16 | .467 |
| Hampton † | 10 | – | 8 | .556 | 16 | – | 16 | .500 |
| Florida A&M | 10 | – | 8 | .556 | 14 | – | 17 | .452 |
| Norfolk State | 10 | – | 8 | .556 | 13 | – | 18 | .419 |
| North Carolina A&T | 6 | – | 12 | .333 | 6 | – | 23 | .207 |
| Howard | 5 | – | 13 | .278 | 7 | – | 22 | .241 |
| Maryland Eastern Shore | 4 | – | 14 | .222 | 7 | – | 22 | .241 |
| Morgan State | 4 | – | 14 | .222 | 4 | – | 26 | .133 |
† 2006 MEAC tournament winner Rankings from AP Poll

2005–06 Missouri Valley Conference men's basketball standings
| | Conf. | | | | Overall |
| Team | W | | L | PCT | W | | L | PCT |
|---|---|---|---|---|---|---|---|---|
| Wichita State | 14 | – | 4 | .778 | 26 | – | 9 | .743 |
| Southern Illinois † | 12 | – | 6 | .667 | 22 | – | 11 | .667 |
| Missouri State | 12 | – | 6 | .667 | 22 | – | 9 | .710 |
| Creighton | 12 | – | 6 | .667 | 20 | – | 10 | .667 |
| Bradley | 11 | – | 7 | .611 | 22 | – | 11 | .667 |
| Northern Iowa | 11 | – | 7 | .611 | 23 | – | 10 | .697 |
| Evansville | 5 | – | 13 | .278 | 10 | – | 19 | .345 |
| Drake | 5 | – | 13 | .278 | 12 | – | 19 | .387 |
| Indiana State | 4 | – | 14 | .222 | 13 | – | 16 | .448 |
| Illinois State | 4 | – | 14 | .222 | 9 | – | 19 | .321 |
† 2006 MVC tournament winner Rankings from AP Poll

2005–06 Mountain West Conference men's basketball standings
| | Conf. | | | | Overall |
| Team | W | | L | PCT | W | | L | PCT |
|---|---|---|---|---|---|---|---|---|
| San Diego State † | 13 | – | 3 | .813 | 24 | – | 9 | .727 |
| Air Force | 12 | – | 4 | .750 | 24 | – | 7 | .774 |
| BYU | 12 | – | 4 | .750 | 20 | – | 9 | .690 |
| UNLV | 10 | – | 6 | .625 | 17 | – | 13 | .567 |
| New Mexico | 8 | – | 8 | .500 | 17 | – | 13 | .567 |
| Utah | 6 | – | 10 | .375 | 14 | – | 15 | .483 |
| Wyoming | 5 | – | 11 | .313 | 14 | – | 18 | .438 |
| Colorado State | 4 | – | 12 | .250 | 16 | – | 15 | .516 |
| TCU | 4 | – | 12 | .250 | 16 | – | 15 | .516 |
† 2006 Mountain West tournament winner Rankings from AP Poll

2005–06 Northeast Conference men's basketball standings
| | Conf. | | | | Overall |
| Team | W | | L | PCT | W | | L | PCT |
|---|---|---|---|---|---|---|---|---|
| Fairleigh Dickinson | 14 | – | 4 | .778 | 20 | – | 12 | .625 |
| Central Connecticut | 13 | – | 5 | .722 | 18 | – | 11 | .621 |
| Monmouth † | 12 | – | 6 | .667 | 19 | – | 15 | .559 |
| Mount St. Mary's | 11 | – | 7 | .611 | 13 | – | 17 | .433 |
| Robert Morris | 10 | – | 8 | .556 | 15 | – | 14 | .517 |
| Long Island | 9 | – | 9 | .500 | 12 | – | 16 | .429 |
| Sacred Heart | 8 | – | 10 | .444 | 11 | – | 17 | .393 |
| Quinnipiac | 7 | – | 11 | .389 | 12 | – | 16 | .429 |
| St. Francis (NY) | 7 | – | 11 | .389 | 10 | – | 17 | .370 |
| Wagner | 6 | – | 12 | .333 | 13 | – | 14 | .481 |
| Saint Francis (PA) | 2 | – | 16 | .111 | 4 | – | 24 | .143 |
† 2006 NEC tournament winner

2005–06 Ohio Valley Conference men's basketball standings
| | Conf. | | | | Overall |
| Team | W | | L | PCT | W | | L | PCT |
|---|---|---|---|---|---|---|---|---|
| Murray State † | 17 | – | 3 | .850 | 24 | – | 7 | .774 |
| Samford | 14 | – | 6 | .700 | 20 | – | 11 | .645 |
| Tennessee Tech | 13 | – | 7 | .650 | 19 | – | 12 | .613 |
| Jacksonville State | 12 | – | 8 | .600 | 16 | – | 13 | .552 |
| Eastern Kentucky | 11 | – | 9 | .550 | 14 | – | 16 | .467 |
| Austin Peay | 11 | – | 9 | .550 | 17 | – | 14 | .548 |
| Tennessee State | 11 | – | 9 | .550 | 13 | – | 15 | .464 |
| UT Martin | 9 | – | 11 | .450 | 13 | – | 15 | .464 |
| Eastern Illinois | 5 | – | 15 | .250 | 7 | – | 20 | .259 |
| Southeast Missouri State | 4 | – | 16 | .200 | 7 | – | 20 | .259 |
| Morehead State | 3 | – | 17 | .150 | 4 | – | 23 | .148 |
† 2006 Ohio Valley Conference tournament winner Rankings from AP Poll

2005–06 Pacific-10 Conference men's basketball standings
| | Conf. | | | | Overall |
| Team | W | | L | PCT | W | | L | PCT |
|---|---|---|---|---|---|---|---|---|
| No. 2 UCLA † | 14 | – | 4 | .778 | 32 | – | 7 | .821 |
| No. 12 Washington | 13 | – | 5 | .722 | 26 | – | 7 | .788 |
| California | 12 | – | 6 | .667 | 20 | – | 11 | .645 |
| Arizona ^{1} | 11 | – | 7 | .611 | 20 | – | 13 | .606 |
| Stanford | 11 | – | 7 | .611 | 16 | – | 14 | .533 |
| USC | 8 | – | 10 | .444 | 17 | – | 13 | .567 |
| Oregon | 7 | – | 11 | .389 | 15 | – | 18 | .455 |
| Oregon State ^{1} | 5 | – | 13 | .278 | 13 | – | 18 | .419 |
| Arizona State | 5 | – | 13 | .278 | 11 | – | 17 | .393 |
| Washington State | 4 | – | 14 | .222 | 11 | – | 17 | .393 |
† Conference tournament winner As of April 3, 2006; Rankings from Coaches Poll^{1} Holds tie-breaker

2005–06 Patriot League men's basketball standings
| | Conf. | | | | Overall |
| Team | W | | L | PCT | W | | L | PCT |
|---|---|---|---|---|---|---|---|---|
| Bucknell † | 14 | – | 0 | 1.000 | 27 | – | 5 | .844 |
| Holy Cross | 11 | – | 3 | .786 | 20 | – | 12 | .625 |
| Lehigh | 11 | – | 3 | .786 | 19 | – | 12 | .613 |
| American | 7 | – | 7 | .500 | 12 | – | 17 | .414 |
| Lafayette | 5 | – | 9 | .357 | 11 | – | 17 | .393 |
| Colgate | 4 | – | 10 | .286 | 10 | – | 19 | .345 |
| Navy | 3 | – | 11 | .214 | 10 | – | 18 | .357 |
| Army | 1 | – | 13 | .071 | 5 | – | 22 | .185 |
† 2006 Patriot League tournament winner

2005–06 Southeastern Conference men's basketball standings
| | Conf. | | | | Overall |
| Team | W | | L | PCT | W | | L | PCT |
|---|---|---|---|---|---|---|---|---|
East
| No. 18 Tennessee | 12 | – | 4 | .750 | 22 | – | 8 | .733 |
| No. 11 Florida † | 10 | – | 6 | .625 | 33 | – | 6 | .846 |
| Kentucky | 9 | – | 7 | .563 | 22 | – | 13 | .629 |
| Vanderbilt | 7 | – | 9 | .438 | 17 | – | 13 | .567 |
| South Carolina | 6 | – | 10 | .375 | 23 | – | 15 | .605 |
| Georgia | 5 | – | 11 | .313 | 15 | – | 15 | .500 |
West
| No. 19 LSU | 14 | – | 2 | .875 | 27 | – | 9 | .750 |
| Alabama | 10 | – | 6 | .625 | 18 | – | 13 | .581 |
| Arkansas | 10 | – | 6 | .625 | 22 | – | 10 | .688 |
| Mississippi State | 5 | – | 11 | .313 | 15 | – | 15 | .500 |
| Auburn | 4 | – | 12 | .250 | 12 | – | 16 | .429 |
| Ole Miss | 4 | – | 12 | .250 | 14 | – | 16 | .467 |
† 2006 SEC tournament winner Rankings from AP Poll

2005–06 Southern Conference men's basketball standings
| | Conf. | | | | Overall |
| Team | W | | L | PCT | W | | L | PCT |
|---|---|---|---|---|---|---|---|---|
North
| Elon | 10 | – | 4 | .714 | 15 | – | 14 | .517 |
| Chattanooga | 8 | – | 6 | .571 | 19 | – | 13 | .594 |
| Western Carolina | 7 | – | 7 | .500 | 13 | – | 17 | .433 |
| Appalachian State | 6 | – | 8 | .429 | 14 | – | 16 | .467 |
| UNC Greensboro | 4 | – | 10 | .286 | 12 | – | 19 | .387 |
South
| Georgia Southern | 11 | – | 4 | .733 | 20 | – | 10 | .667 |
| Davidson† | 10 | – | 5 | .667 | 20 | – | 11 | .645 |
| College of Charleston | 9 | – | 6 | .600 | 17 | – | 11 | .607 |
| Furman | 8 | – | 7 | .533 | 15 | – | 13 | .536 |
| Wofford | 6 | – | 9 | .400 | 11 | – | 18 | .379 |
| The Citadel | 1 | – | 14 | .067 | 10 | – | 21 | .323 |
† SoCon Tournament winner As of April 30, 2006; Rankings from AP poll

2005–06 Southland Conference men's basketball standings
| | Conf. | | | | Overall |
| Team | W | | L | PCT | W | | L | PCT |
|---|---|---|---|---|---|---|---|---|
| Northwestern State † | 15 | – | 1 | .938 | 26 | – | 8 | .765 |
| Sam Houston State | 11 | – | 5 | .688 | 22 | – | 9 | .710 |
| Southeastern Louisiana | 10 | – | 6 | .625 | 16 | – | 12 | .571 |
| Stephen F. Austin | 9 | – | 7 | .563 | 17 | – | 12 | .586 |
| Lamar | 9 | – | 7 | .563 | 17 | – | 14 | .548 |
| McNeese State | 9 | – | 7 | .563 | 14 | – | 14 | .500 |
| Texas–Arlington | 7 | – | 9 | .438 | 14 | – | 16 | .467 |
| UTSA | 6 | – | 10 | .375 | 11 | – | 17 | .393 |
| Louisiana–Monroe | 6 | – | 10 | .375 | 10 | – | 18 | .357 |
| Nicholls State | 5 | – | 11 | .313 | 9 | – | 18 | .333 |
| Texas State | 1 | – | 15 | .063 | 3 | – | 24 | .111 |
† 2006 Southland tournament winner As of March 6, 2006

2005–06 SWAC men's basketball standings
| | Conf. | | | | Overall |
| Team | W | | L | PCT | W | | L | PCT |
|---|---|---|---|---|---|---|---|---|
| Southern † | 15 | – | 3 | .833 | 20 | – | 13 | .606 |
| Grambling State | 11 | – | 7 | .611 | 14 | – | 13 | .519 |
| Alabama A&M | 11 | – | 7 | .611 | 13 | – | 13 | .500 |
| Jackson State | 10 | – | 8 | .556 | 15 | – | 17 | .469 |
| Alabama State | 10 | – | 8 | .556 | 12 | – | 18 | .400 |
| Mississippi Valley State | 9 | – | 9 | .500 | 9 | – | 19 | .321 |
| Arkansas–Pine Bluff | 8 | – | 10 | .444 | 13 | – | 16 | .448 |
| Alcorn State | 8 | – | 10 | .444 | 8 | – | 20 | .286 |
| Texas Southern | 6 | – | 12 | .333 | 8 | – | 22 | .267 |
| Prairie View A&M | 2 | – | 16 | .111 | 5 | – | 24 | .172 |
† 2006 SWAC tournament winner Rankings from AP Poll

2005–06 Sun Belt Conference men's basketball standings
| | Conf. | | | | Overall |
| Team | W | | L | PCT | W | | L | PCT |
|---|---|---|---|---|---|---|---|---|
East
| Western Kentucky | 12 | – | 2 | .857 | 23 | – | 8 | .742 |
| Middle Tennessee | 8 | – | 6 | .571 | 16 | – | 12 | .571 |
| Arkansas State | 7 | – | 7 | .500 | 12 | – | 18 | .400 |
| Arkansas-Little Rock | 5 | – | 9 | .357 | 14 | – | 15 | .483 |
| Florida International | 4 | – | 10 | .286 | 8 | – | 20 | .286 |
West
| South Alabama † | 12 | – | 3 | .800 | 24 | – | 7 | .774 |
| Louisiana–Lafayette | 7 | – | 8 | .467 | 13 | – | 16 | .448 |
| Denver | 7 | – | 8 | .467 | 15 | – | 16 | .484 |
| New Orleans | 6 | – | 9 | .400 | 10 | – | 19 | .345 |
| North Texas | 6 | – | 9 | .400 | 14 | – | 14 | .500 |
| Troy | 6 | – | 9 | .400 | 14 | – | 15 | .483 |
† 2006 Sun Belt Conference tournament winner Rankings from AP Poll

2005–06 WAC men's basketball standings
| | Conf. | | | | Overall |
| Team | W | | L | PCT | W | | L | PCT |
|---|---|---|---|---|---|---|---|---|
| No. 20 Nevada † | 13 | – | 3 | .813 | 27 | – | 6 | .818 |
| Utah State | 11 | – | 5 | .688 | 23 | – | 9 | .719 |
| Louisiana Tech | 11 | – | 5 | .688 | 20 | – | 13 | .606 |
| Hawaii | 10 | – | 6 | .625 | 17 | – | 11 | .607 |
| New Mexico State | 10 | – | 6 | .625 | 16 | – | 14 | .533 |
| Fresno State | 8 | – | 8 | .500 | 15 | – | 13 | .536 |
| Boise State | 6 | – | 10 | .375 | 14 | – | 15 | .483 |
| San Jose State | 2 | – | 14 | .125 | 6 | – | 25 | .194 |
| Idaho | 1 | – | 15 | .063 | 4 | – | 25 | .138 |
† 2006 WAC tournament winner Rankings from AP poll

2005–06 West Coast Conference men's basketball standings
| | Conf. | | | | Overall |
| Team | W | | L | PCT | W | | L | PCT |
|---|---|---|---|---|---|---|---|---|
| No. 5 Gonzaga † | 14 | – | 0 | 1.000 | 29 | – | 4 | .879 |
| Loyola Marymount | 8 | – | 6 | .571 | 12 | – | 18 | .400 |
| Saint Mary's | 8 | – | 6 | .571 | 17 | – | 12 | .586 |
| San Francisco | 7 | – | 7 | .500 | 11 | – | 17 | .393 |
| San Diego | 6 | – | 8 | .429 | 18 | – | 12 | .600 |
| Santa Clara | 5 | – | 9 | .357 | 13 | – | 16 | .448 |
| Portland | 5 | – | 9 | .357 | 11 | – | 18 | .379 |
| Pepperdine | 3 | – | 11 | .214 | 7 | – | 20 | .259 |
† 2006 WCC tournament winner Rankings from AP Poll

=== Division I independents ===
Ten schools played as Division I independents. Only IPFW, Savannah State, Texas A&M–Corpus Christi, and Texas–Pan American were considered full NCAA Division I schools, as the rest were still in a transition phase from NCAA Division II.

2005–06 NCAA Division I men's basketball independents standings
| | Conf. | | | | Overall |
| Team | W | | L | PCT | W | | L | PCT |
|---|---|---|---|---|---|---|---|---|
| Texas A&M–Corpus Christi | | – | | – | 20 | – | 8 | .714 |
| North Dakota State | | – | | – | 16 | – | 12 | .571 |
| Utah Valley State | | – | | – | 16 | – | 13 | .552 |
| IPFW | | – | | – | 10 | – | 18 | .357 |
| Longwood | | – | | – | 10 | – | 20 | .333 |
| South Dakota State | | – | | – | 9 | – | 20 | .310 |
| UC Davis | | – | | – | 8 | – | 20 | .286 |
| Texas–Pan American | | – | | – | 7 | – | 24 | .226 |
| Northern Colorado | | – | | – | 5 | – | 24 | .172 |
| Savannah State | | – | | – | 2 | – | 28 | .067 |
Rankings from AP Poll

=== Informal championships ===
| Conference | Regular season winner | Most Valuable Player |
|---|---|---|
| Philadelphia Big 5 | Villanova | Randy Foye, Villanova |

Villanova finished with a 4–0 record in head-to-head competition among the Philadelphia Big 5.

=== Statistical leaders ===
Source for additional stats categories

| Points per game | | | Rebounds per game | | | Assists per game | | | Steals per game | | |
| Player | School | PPG | Player | School | RPG | Player | School | APG | Player | School | SPG |
| Adam Morrison | Gonzaga | 28.1 | Paul Millsap | LA Tech | 13.3 | Jared Jordan | Marist | 8.5 | Tim Smith | E. Tennessee St. | 3.4 |
| JJ Redick | Duke | 26.8 | Kenny Adeleke | Hartford | 13.1 | José Juan Barea | Northeastern | 8.4 | Oliver Lafayette | Houston | 3.4 |
| Keydren Clark | St. Peter's | 26.3 | Rashad Jones-Jennings | UALR | 11.3 | Terrell Everett | Oklahoma | 6.9 | Obie Trotter | Alabama A&M | 3.3 |
| Andre Collins | Loyola (MD) | 26.1 | Curtis Withers | Charlotte | 11.3 | Walker Russell | Jacksonville St. | 6.8 | Ibrahim Jaaber | Penn | 3.3 |
| Brion Rush | Grambling | 25.8 | Ivan Almonte | Florida Int'l | 11.2 | Kenny Grant | Davidson | 6.7 | Kevin Hamilton | Holy Cross | 3.3 |

| Blocked shots per game | | | Field-goal percentage | | | Three-Point FG percentage | | | Free-throw percentage | | |
| Player | School | BPG | Player | School | FG% | Player | School | 3FG% | Player | School | FT% |
| Shawn James | Northeastern | 6.5 | Randall Hanke | Providence | 67.7 | Stephen Sir | N. Arizona | 48.9 | Blake Ahearn | Missouri St. | 93.6 |
| Justin Williams | Wyoming | 5.4 | Cedric Smith | TAMU-CC | 66.2 | Josh Alexander | Stephen F. Austin | 47.7 | Jermaine Anderson | New Hampshire | 91.9 |
| Stéphane Lasme | UMass | 3.9 | Joakim Noah | Florida | 62.7 | J. Robert Merritt | Samford | 47.6 | Shawan Robinson | Clemson | 91.3 |
| Shelden Williams | Duke | 3.8 | James Augustine | Illinois | 62.4 | Ross Schraeder | UC Irvine | 47.4 | Derek Raivio | Gonzaga | 91.2 |
| Slim Millien | Idaho St. | 3.4 | Michael Harrison | Colorado St. | 62.3 | Chris Hernandez | Stanford | 47.2 | Adam Vogelsberg | Middle Tenn. St. | 90.8 |

== Post-season tournaments ==
=== NCAA tournament ===
The NCAA Tournament tipped off on March 14, 2006 with the opening round game in Dayton, Ohio, and concluded on April 3 at the RCA Dome in Indianapolis, Indiana. A total of 65 teams entered the tournament. Thirty of the teams earned automatic bids by winning their conference tournaments. The automatic bid of the Ivy League, which does not conduct a post-season tournament, went to its regular season champion. The remaining 34 teams were granted "at-large" bids, which are extended by the NCAA Selection Committee. The Big East Conference led the way with eight bids. Florida won their first NCAA title, beating UCLA 73–56 in the final. Florida forward Joakim Noah was named the tournament's Most Outstanding Player.

==== Final Four – RCA Dome, Indianapolis, Indiana ====
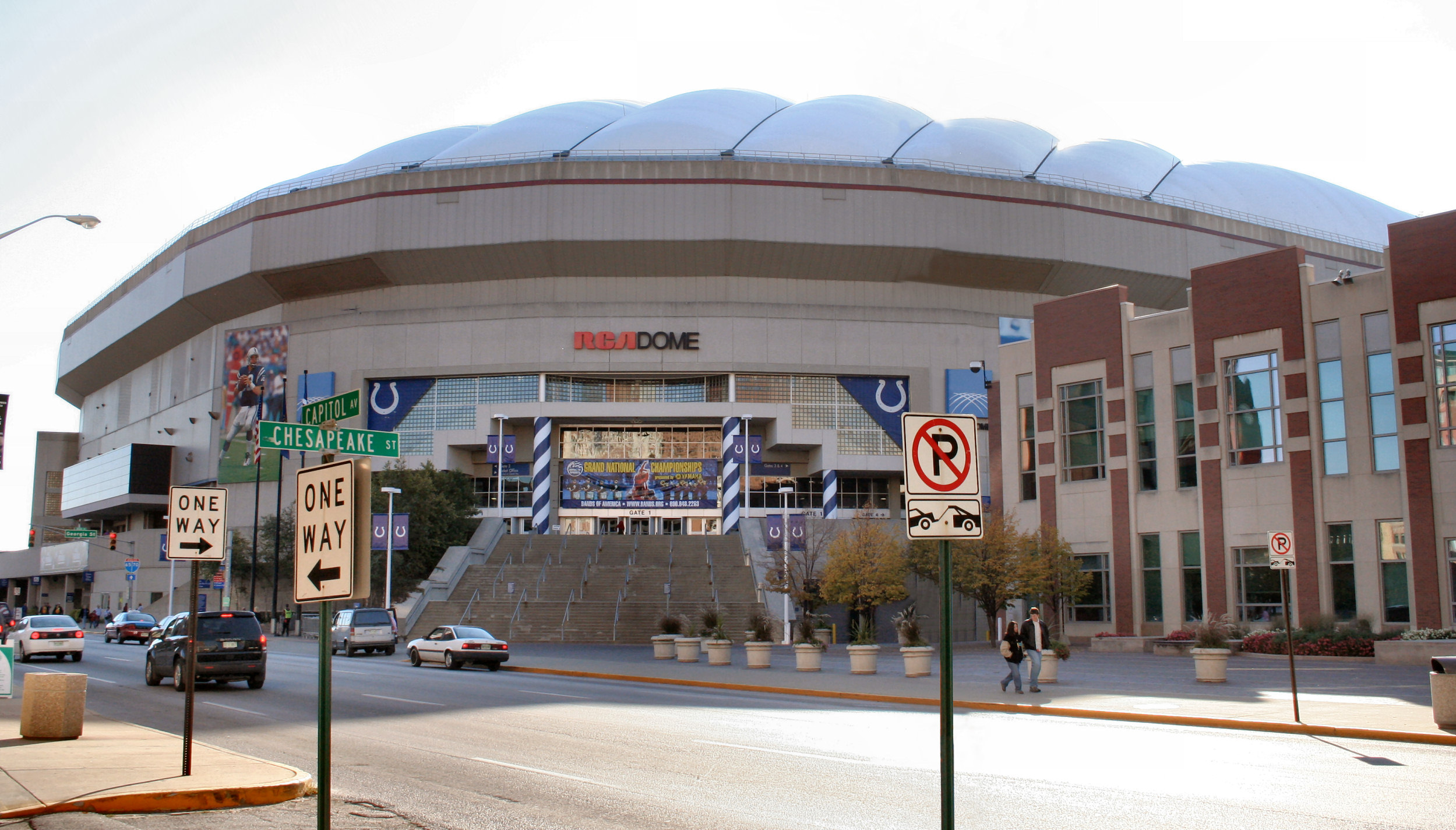
The RCA Dome in Indianapolis, Indiana, was the site of the Final Four and Championship game to end the 2005–06 season.

National semifinals
A4 | LSU | 45
O2 | UCLA | 59
W11 | George Mason | 58
M3 | Florida | 73

National championship
O2 | UCLA | 57
M3 | Florida | 73

A-Atlanta, O-Oakland, W-Washington, D.C., M-Minneapolis.

=== National Invitation tournament ===
After the NCAA Tournament field was announced, the 2006 National Invitation Tournament invited 40 teams to participate. Eight teams were given automatic bids for winning their conference regular seasons, and 32 other teams were also invited. Dave Odom's South Carolina Gamecocks won their second consecutive title, defeating the Tommy Amaker-coached Michigan Wolverines 76–64 in the championship game. Gamecock forward Renaldo Balkman was named tournament MVP.

==== Semifinals & final ====
Semifinals
5 | Old Dominion | 43
1 | Michigan | 66
1 | Louisville | 63
3 | South Carolina | 78

Final
1 | Michigan | 64
3 | South Carolina | 76

== Award winners ==
=== Consensus All-American teams ===
Consensus First Team
| Player | Position | Class | Team |
|---|---|---|---|
| JJ Redick | G | Senior | Duke |
| Adam Morrison | F | Junior | Gonzaga |
| Randy Foye | G | Senior | Villanova |
| Shelden Williams | C | Senior | Duke |
| Brandon Roy | G | Senior | Washington |

Consensus Second Team
| Player | Position | Class | Team |
|---|---|---|---|
| Dee Brown | G | Senior | Illinois |
| Rodney Carney | G | Senior | Memphis |
| P. J. Tucker | F | Junior | Texas |
| Rudy Gay | F | Sophomore | Connecticut |
| Leon Powe | F | Sophomore | California |
| Allan Ray | G | Senior | Villanova |
| Tyler Hansbrough | F | Freshman | North Carolina |

=== Major player of the year awards ===
- Wooden Award: JJ Redick, Duke
- Naismith Award: JJ Redick, Duke
- Associated Press Player of the Year: JJ Redick, Duke
- NABC Player of the Year: JJ Redick, Duke and Adam Morrison, Gonzaga
- Oscar Robertson Trophy (USBWA): JJ Redick, Duke and Adam Morrison, Gonzaga
- Adolph Rupp Trophy: JJ Redick, Duke
- CBS/Chevrolet Player of the Year: JJ Redick, Duke
- Sporting News Player of the Year: JJ Redick, Duke

=== Major freshman of the year awards ===
- USBWA Freshman of the Year: Tyler Hansbrough, North Carolina
- Sporting News Freshman of the Year: Tyler Hansbrough, North Carolina

=== Major coach of the year awards ===
- Associated Press Coach of the Year: Jay Wright, Villanova
- Henry Iba Award (USBWA): Roy Williams, North Carolina
- NABC Coach of the Year: Jay Wright, Villanova
- Naismith College Coach of the Year: Jay Wright, Villanova
- CBS/Chevrolet Coach of the Year: Jay Wright, Villanova
- Adolph Rupp Cup: Roy Williams, North Carolina
- Sporting News Coach of the Year: Bruce Pearl, Tennessee

=== Other major awards ===
- Bob Cousy Award (Best point guard): Dee Brown, Illinois
- Pete Newell Big Man Award (Best big man): Glen Davis, LSU
- NABC Defensive Player of the Year: Shelden Williams, Duke
- Frances Pomeroy Naismith Award (Best player under 6'0): Dee Brown, Illinois
- Lowe's Senior CLASS Award (top senior): JJ Redick, Duke
- Robert V. Geasey Trophy (Top player in Philadelphia Big 5): Randy Foye, Villanova
- NIT/Haggerty Award (Top player in New York City metro area): Quincy Douby, Rutgers
- Chip Hilton Player of the Year Award (Strong personal character): Gerry McNamara, Syracuse

== Coaching changes ==
A number of teams changed coaches throughout the season and after the season ended.

| Team | Former Coach | Interim Coach | New Coach | Reason |
|---|---|---|---|---|
| Alabama-Birmingham | Mike Anderson | | Mike Davis | After leaving Indiana, Davis returned to his home state—bringing guard Robert Vaden with him. |
| Arizona State | Rob Evans | | Herb Sendek | After a high-profile flirtation with Pitt's Jamie Dixon, Arizona State pulled Sendek from the ACC. |
| Ball State | Tim Buckley | | Ronny Thompson | Buckley was reassigned after a 10–18 season. |
| Brown | Glen Miller | | Craig Robinson | Brown hired former 2-time Ivy player of the year Robinson after Miller leaves for conference rival Penn. |
| Canisius | Mike MacDonald | | Tom Parrotta | |
| Central Michigan | Jay Smith | | Ernie Ziegler | Two-time MAC coach of the year Smith left the coaching profession. |
| Cincinnati | Bob Huggins | Andy Kennedy | Mick Cronin | UC alum Cronin was hired for the head job over interim boss Kennedy. |
| The Citadel | Pat Dennis | | Ed Conroy | |
| Cleveland State | Mike Garland | | Gary Waters | |
| College of Charleston | Tom Herrion | | Bobby Cremins | College of Charleston made a splash hiring former Georgia Tech head man Cremins after Winthrop's Gregg Marshall accepted the job but then reneged. |
| Delaware | David Henderson | | Monte Ross | Henderson is fired after consecutive 20-loss seasons. |
| Duquesne | Danny Nee | | Ron Everhart | Coaching veteran Nee was fired after a 3–24 season. |
| Fairfield | Tim O'Toole | | Ed Cooley | O'Toole was fired only two years removed from winning MAAC coach of the year honors. |
| Florida Atlantic | Matt Doherty | | Rex Walters | Doherty leaves FAU for SMU after only one year. |
| Furman | Larry Davis | | Jeff Jackson | |
| Hampton | Bobby Collins | | Kevin Nickelberry | |
| Hartford | Larry Harrison | | Dan Leibovitz | Harrison resigned despite being named America East coach of the year. |
| Idaho | Leonard Perry | | George Pfeifer | |
| Idaho State | Doug Oliver | | Joe O'Brien | Oliver announced his resignation mid-season and was replaced in March by three-time JUCO national championship coach O'Brien. |
| Indiana | Mike Davis | | Kelvin Sampson | Davis announced his resignation in February—effective at the end of the season. After a long search process, Indiana hired former Oklahoma coach Sampson. |
| Iowa State | Wayne Morgan | | Greg McDermott | Iowa State fired Morgan in the wake of a recruiting scandal. |
| Kansas State | Jim Wooldridge | | Bob Huggins | K-State hired Huggins after a one-year absence from coaching. |
| Lamar | Billy Tubbs | | Steve Roccaforte | Tubbs stepped down as head coach but remained as Lamar's Athletic Director, turning the team over to assistant Roccaforte. |
| Manhattan | Bobby Gonzalez | | Barry Rohrssen | A hot coach for several seasons, Gonzalez made the move to the Big East and Seton Hall. |
| McNeese State | Tic Price | | Dave Simmons | |
| Mississippi | Rod Barnes | | Andy Kennedy | Ole Miss hired native son Kennedy after he was passed over for the permanent head coaching position at Cincinnati after serving as interim for the entire season. |
| Missouri | Quin Snyder | Melvin Watkins | Mike Anderson | Snyder was fired in February as his status became distracting due to a disappointing season and off-court scandal. |
| Montana | Larry Krystkowiak | | Wayne Tinkle | Montana all-time leading scorer Krystkowiak left Montana for an assistant coaching job with the Milwaukee Bucks, while his former Grizzly teammate and assistant Tinkle is promoted. |
| Montana State | Mick Durham | | Brad Huse | |
| Morehead State | Kyle Macy | | Donnie Tyndall | Former Kentucky All-American Macy resigns after a 4–23 season. |
| Morgan State | Butch Beard | | Todd Bozeman | Bozeman returns to coaching after an eight-year ban over recruiting violations at Cal. |
| Murray State | Mick Cronin | | Billy Kennedy | |
| Nebraska | Barry Collier | | Doc Sadler | Collier left Nebraska to become athletic director at Butler. |
| New Orleans | Monte Towe | | Buzz Williams | Towe made the unusual move of leaving a head coaching spot to take the Associate head coach spot at his alma mater, NC State. |
| North Carolina State | Herb Sendek | | Sidney Lowe | After a lengthy search process, former Wolfpack guard Lowe comes in from an assistant coaching job with the Detroit Pistons. |
| UNC-Wilmington | Brad Brownell | | Benny Moss | |
| Northeastern | Ron Everhart | | Bill Coen | |
| Northern Colorado | Craig Rasmuson | | Tad Boyle | |
| Northern Iowa | Greg McDermott | | Ben Jacobson | UNI promoted top assistant Jacobson after McDermott left for Iowa State. |
| Oklahoma | Kelvin Sampson | | Jeff Capel | Oklahoma tapped VCU's Capel after Sampson left for Indiana. |
| Oklahoma State | Eddie Sutton | | Sean Sutton | Eddie Sutton turned the Cowboys over to son Sean. |
| Penn | Fran Dunphy | | Glen Miller | Penn raided conference foe Brown to hire Miller away after Dunphy moved across town to coach Temple. |
| Pepperdine | Paul Westphal | | Vance Walberg | Former Phoenix Suns coach Westphal was fired after a 7–20 season. |
| Portland | Michael Holton | | Eric Reveno | |
| Rutgers | Gary Waters | | Fred Hill | Waters announced that he would resign late in the season. After the season, he was replaced by assistant Hill. |
| Saint Peter's | Bob Leckie | | John Dunne | |
| Seton Hall | Louis Orr | | Bobby Gonzalez | Seton Hall turns to Manhattan's Gonzalez after Orr is fired. |
| Southern Methodist | Jimmy Tubbs | | Matt Doherty | Tubbs was fired after an internal investigation uncovered NCAA violations. |
| South Carolina State | Ben Betts | | Jammal Brown | Betts left to join Jeff Capel's staff at Oklahoma. |
| Southeast Missouri State | Gary Garner | | Scott Edgar | |
| Temple | John Chaney | | Fran Dunphy | Chaney retired after 24 seasons at Temple, allowing Dunphy to become the first man ever to coach at two different Big 5 schools. |
| Texas-Arlington | Eddie McCarter | | Scott Cross | |
| Texas-Pan American | Robert Davenport | | Tom Schuberth | |
| Texas-San Antonio | Tim Carter | | Brooks Thompson | |
| Texas State | Dennis Nutt | | Doug Davalos | |
| UTEP | Doc Sadler | | Tony Barbee | UTEP tapped Memphis assistant Barbee after Sadler left for Nebraska. |
| Virginia Commonwealth | Jeff Capel | | Anthony Grant | VCU hired Florida assistant Grant after Capel left for the Big 12. |
| Washington State | Dick Bennett | | Tony Bennett | Dick Bennett retired, handing the reins to his son and assistant Tony. |
| Weber State | Joe Cravens | | Randy Rahe | |
| Winston-Salem State | Phillip Stitt | | Bobby Collins | Collins was hired from Hampton to lead the Rams into their first season of Division I play. |
| Wright State | Paul Biancardi | | Brad Brownell | Biancardi stepped down after being barred from recruiting by the NCAA over recruiting violations that occurred while Biancardi was at Ohio State. |
