= Hammons Student Center =

Multi-purpose arena in Springfield, Missouri

Coordinates: 37°12′08″N 93°17′04″W

The John Q. Hammons Student Center is an 8,846-seat multi-purpose arena on the campus of Missouri State University in Springfield, Missouri. It was built in 1976 and is the home of the Missouri State Bears. The arena was replaced by the Great Southern Bank Arena in 2008.
