= List of George Mason Patriots men's basketball seasons =

The George Mason Patriots men's basketball team represents George Mason University (Mason) and competes in the Atlantic 10 Conference of NCAA Division I. The Patriots play at the Patriot Center in Fairfax, Virginia, on the George Mason campus. The following is a list of the program's completed seasons.

== Season results ==
Statistics overview
Season	Coach	Overall	Conference	Standing	Postseason
Arnold Siegfried (Independent) (1966–1967)
1966–67	Arnold Siegfried	6–12			
Raymond Spuhler (Independent) (1966–1972)
1967–68	Raymond Spuhler	5–17			
1968–69	Raymond Spuhler	2–20			
1969–70	Raymond Spuhler	4–23			
John Linn (Independent) (1970–1972)
1970–71	John Linn	9–17			
1971–72	John Linn	12–18			
1972–73	John Linn	15–16			
John Linn (Mason–Dixon Conference) (1973–1978)
1973–74	John Linn	19–10			
1974–75	John Linn	19–8			
1975–76	John Linn	16–13			
1976–77	John Linn	9–18			
1977–78	John Linn	5–21			
John Linn (Independent) (1978–1980)
1978–79	John Linn	17–8			
1979–80	John Linn	5–21			
Joe Harrington (Independent) (1980–1982)
1980–81	Joe Harrington	10–16			
1981–82	Joe Harrington	13–14			
Joe Harrington (Eastern College Athletic Conference) (1982–1985)
1982–83	Joe Harrington	15–12	3–6	4th	
1983–84	Joe Harrington	21–7	5–5	T–4th	
1984–85	Joe Harrington	18–11	10–4	3rd	
Joe Harrington (Colonial Athletic Association) (1985–1987)
1985–86	Joe Harrington	20–12	10–4	3rd	NIT Second Round
1986–87	Joe Harrington	15–13	7–7	5th	
Rick Barnes (Colonial Athletic Association) (1987–1988)
1987–88	Rick Barnes	20–10	10–5	2nd	
Ernie Nestor (Colonial Athletic Association) (1988–1993)
1988–89	Ernie Nestor	20–11	11–4	2nd	NCAA Division I First Round
1989–90	Ernie Nestor	20–12	11–5	4th	
1990–91	Ernie Nestor	14–16	10–7	4th	
1991–92	Ernie Nestor	7–21	3–11	8th	
1992–93	Ernie Nestor	7–21	2–11	8th	
Paul Westhead (Colonial Athletic Association) (1993–1997)
1993–94	Paul Westhead	10–17	5–9	6th	
1994–95	Paul Westhead	7–20	2–12	8th	
1995–96	Paul Westhead	11–16	6–10	T–6th	
1996–97	Paul Westhead	10–17	4–12	9th	
Jim Larrañaga (Colonial Athletic Association) (1997–2011)
1997–98	Jim Larrañaga	9–18	6–10	T–5th	
1998–99	Jim Larrañaga	19–11	13–3	1st	NCAA Division I First Round
1999–00	Jim Larrañaga	19–11	12–4	T–1st	
2000–01	Jim Larrañaga	18–12	11–5	T–2nd	NCAA Division I First Round
2001–02	Jim Larrañaga	19–10	13–5	2nd	NIT Opening Round
2002–03	Jim Larrañaga	16–12	11–7	4th	
2003–04	Jim Larrañaga	23–10	12–6	3rd	NIT Second Round
2004–05	Jim Larrañaga	16–13	10–8	6th	
2005–06	Jim Larrañaga	27–8	15–3	T–1st	NCAA Division I Final Four
2006–07	Jim Larrañaga	18–15	9–9	T–5th	
2007–08	Jim Larrañaga	23–11	12–6	3rd	NCAA Division I First Round
2008–09	Jim Larrañaga	22–11	13–5	2nd	NIT First Round
2009–10	Jim Larrañaga	17–15	12–6	4th	CIT First Round
2010–11	Jim Larrañaga	27–7	16–2	1st	NCAA Division I Third Round
Paul Hewitt (Colonial Athletic Association) (2011–2013)
2011–12	Paul Hewitt	23–8	14–4	3rd	
2012–13	Paul Hewitt	22–16	10–8	T–5th	CBI Runner–up
Paul Hewitt (Atlantic 10 Conference) (2013–2015)
2013–14	Paul Hewitt	11–20	4–12	12th	
2014–15	Paul Hewitt	9–22	4–14	13th	
Dave Paulsen (Atlantic 10 Conference) (2015–2021)
2015–16	Dave Paulsen	11–21	5–13	12th	
2016–17	Dave Paulsen	20–14	9–9	7th	CBI First Round
2017–18	Dave Paulsen	16–17	9–9	T–5th	
2018–19	Dave Paulsen	18–15	11–7	T–5th	
2019–20	Dave Paulsen	17–15	5–13	12th	No postseason held
2020–21	Dave Paulsen	13–9	8–6	T–4th	
Kim English (Atlantic 10 Conference) (2021–2023)
2021–22	Kim English	14–16	7–9	9th	
2022–23	Kim English	20–13	11–7	5th	
Tony Skinn (Atlantic 10 Conference) (2023–present)
2023–24	Tony Skinn	20–12	9–9	8th	
2024–25	Tony Skinn	27–9	15–3	T–1st	NIT Second Round
2025–26	Tony Skinn	23–10	11–7	5th	NIT First Round
Total:		890–827			
National champion Postseason invitational champion Conference regular season champion Conference regular season and conference tournament champion Division regular season champion Division regular season and conference tournament champion Conference tournament champion

== Postseason results ==
=== NCAA tournament results ===
The Patriots have appeared in the NCAA tournament six times. Their combined record is 5–6.

Year	Round	Opponent	Result/Score
1989	First Round	Indiana	L 85–99
1999	First Round	Cincinnati	L 48–72
2001	First Round	Maryland	L 80–83
2006	First Round; Second Round; Sweet Sixteen; Elite Eight; Final Four	Michigan State; North Carolina; Wichita State; Connecticut; Florida	W 75–65; W 65–60; W 63–55; W 86–84 ^{OT} L 58–73
2008	First Round	Notre Dame	L 50–68
2011	Second Round; Third Round	Villanova; Ohio State	W 61–57; L 66–98

=== NIT results ===
The Patriots have appeared in the National Invitation Tournament (NIT) four times. Their combined record is 3–4.

Year	Round	Opponent	Result/Score
1986	First Round; Second Round	Lamar; Providence	W 65–63; L 71–90
2002	Opening Round	Saint Joseph's	L 64–73
2004	Opening Round; First Round; Second Round	Tennessee; Austin Peay; Oregon	W 58–55; W 66–60; L 54–68
2009	First Round	Penn State	L 73–77 ^{OT}

=== CBI results ===
The Patriots have appeared in the College Basketball Invitational (CBI) one time. Their record is 4–2.

Year	Round	Opponent	Result/Score
2013	First Round; Quarterfinals; Semifinals; Finals Game 1 Finals Game 2 Finals Game 3	College of Charleston; Houston; Western Michigan; Santa Clara; Santa Clara; Santa Clara	W 78–77; W 88–84 ^{OT} W 62–52; L 73–81; W 73–66; L 77–80

=== CIT results ===
The Patriots have appeared in the CollegeInsider.com Postseason Tournament (CIT) one time. Their record is 0–1.

Year	Round	Opponent	Result/Score
2010	First Round	Fairfield	L 96–101 ^{OT}
