= List of George Mason Patriots men's basketball head coaches =

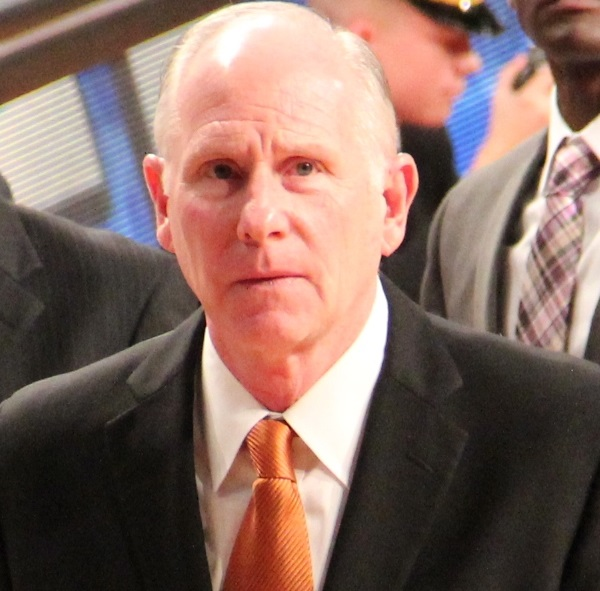
Jim Larrañaga, 1997–2011

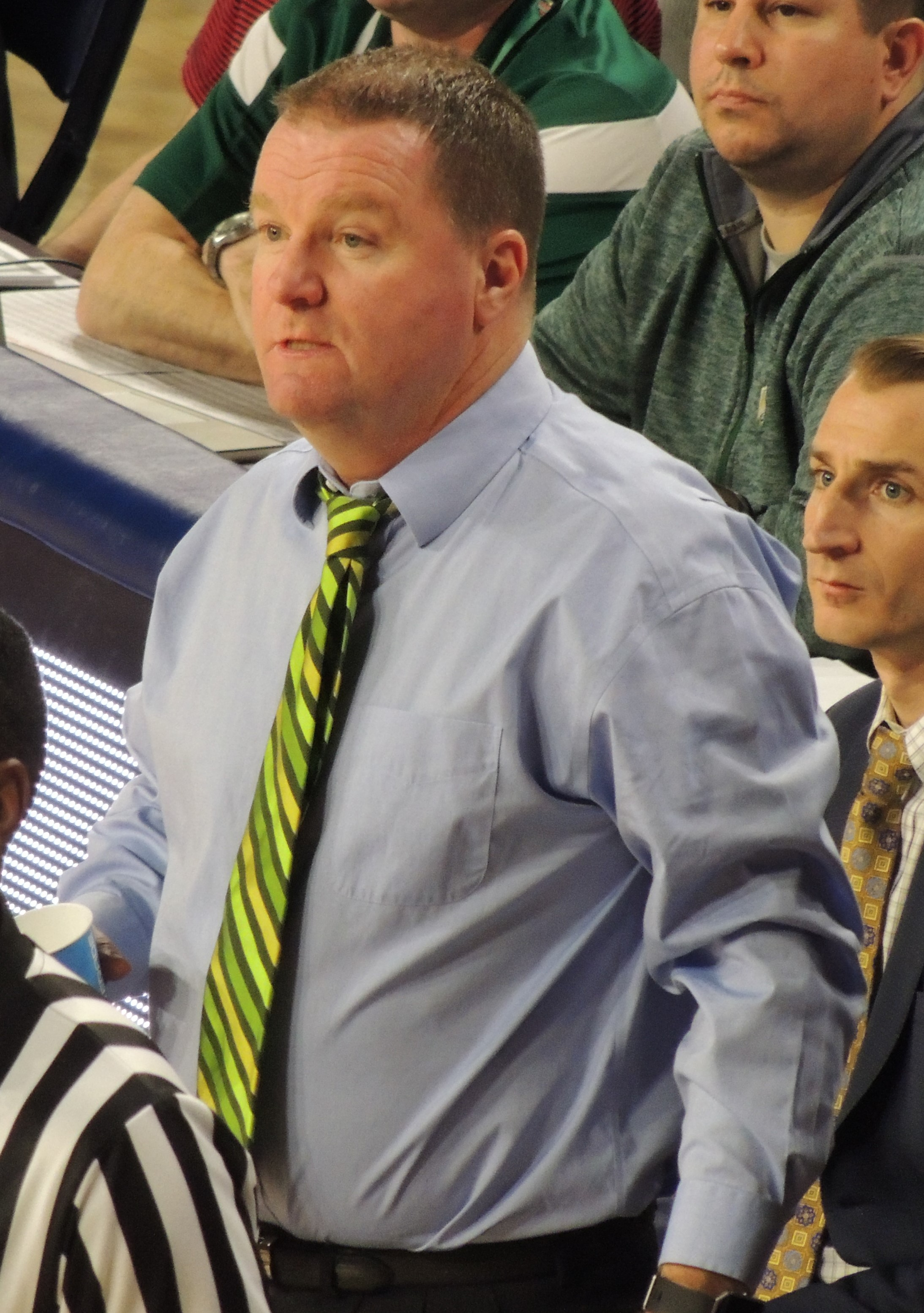
Dave Paulsen, 2015-2021

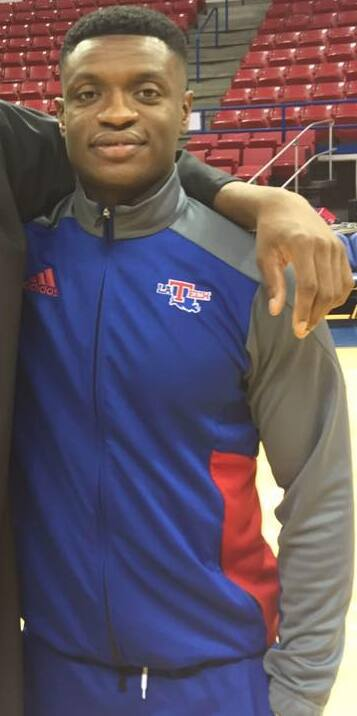
Tony Skinn, 2023–present

The following is a list of George Mason Patriots men's basketball head coaches. There have been 12 head coaches of the Patriots in their 59-season history.

George Mason's current head coach is Tony Skinn. He was hired as the Patriots' head coach in March 2023, replacing Kim English, who left to become the head coach at Providence.

No.	Tenure	Coach	Years	Record	Pct.
1	1966–1967	Arnold Siegfried	1	6–12	.333
2	1967–1970	Hap Spuhler	3	11–60	.155
3	1970–1980	John Linn	10	130–147	.469
4	1980–1987	Joe Harrington	7	112–85	.569
5	1987–1988	Rick Barnes	1	20–10	.667
6	1988–1993	Ernie Nestor	5	68–81	.456
7	1993–1997	Paul Westhead	4	38–70	.352
8	1997–2011	Jim Larrañaga	14	273–164	.625
9	2011–2015	Paul Hewitt	4	66–67	.496
10	2015–2021	Dave Paulsen	6	95–91	.511
11	2021–2023	Kim English	2	34–29	.540
12	2023–present	Tony Skinn	3	70–31	.693
Totals		12 coaches	59 seasons	923–847	.521
Records updated through end of 2024–25 season Source
