= 2005 Paradise Jam =

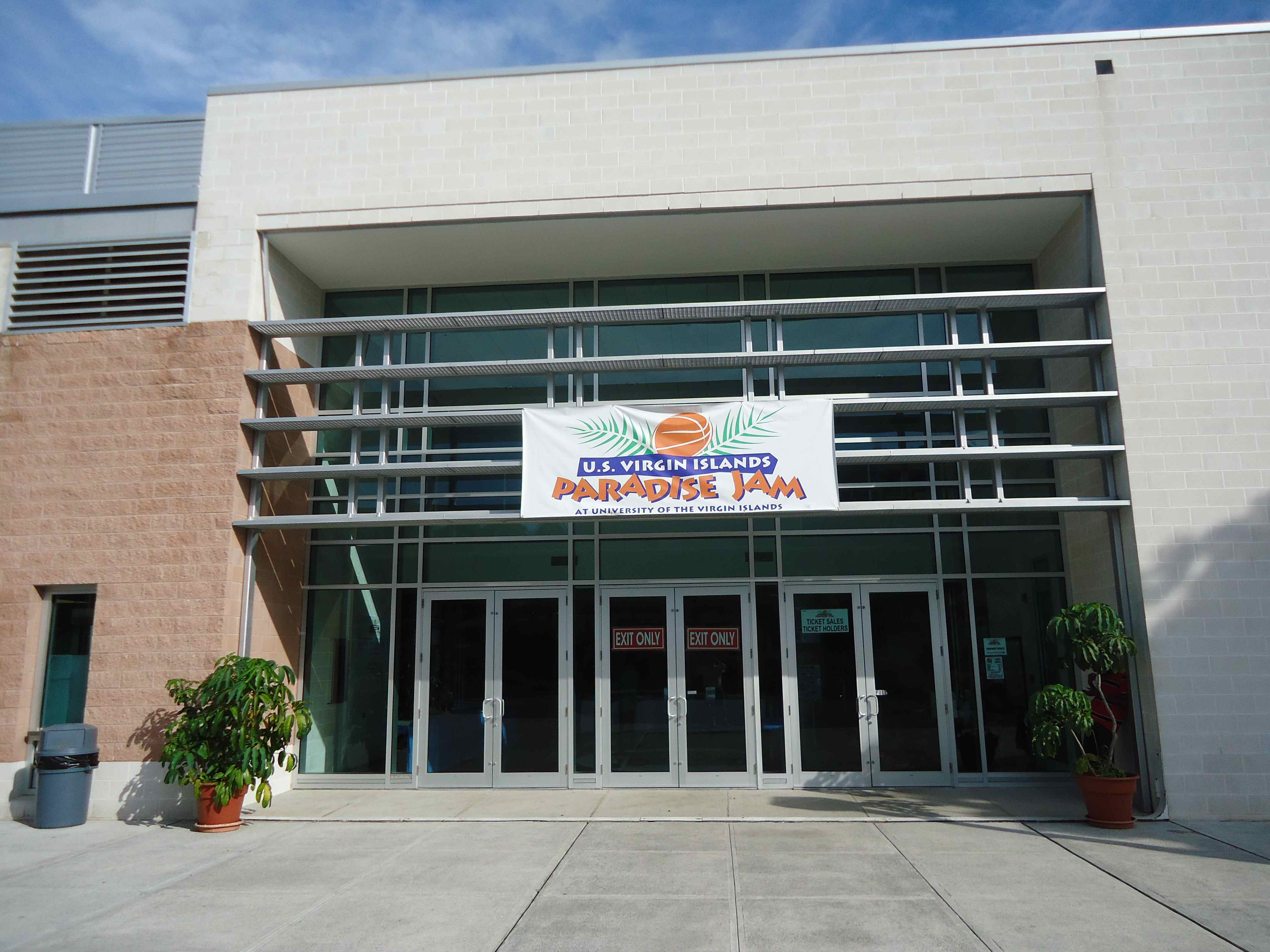
- University of the Virgin Islands Sports and Fitness Center
- Season: 2005–06
- Teams: 6 (men's), 8 (women's)
- Finals site: Sports and Fitness Center, Saint Thomas, U.S. Virgin Islands
- Champions: Wisconsin (men's); Minnesota (women's Saint Thomas); Tennessee (women's Saint John)
- MVP: Alando Tucker, Wisconsin (men's); Jamie Broback, Minnesota (women's Saint Thomas); Candace Parker, Tennessee (women's Saint John)

The 2005 Paradise Jam was an early-season men's and women's college basketball tournament. The tournament, which began in 2000, was part of the 2005–06 NCAA Division I men's basketball season and 2005–06 NCAA Division I women's basketball season. The tournament was played at the Sports and Fitness Center in Saint Thomas, U.S. Virgin Islands. Wisconsin won the men's tournament, in the women's tournament Minnesota won the Saint Thomas division, and Tennessee won the Saint John Division.

== Men's tournament ==
Teams were arranged into two divisions consisting of three teams each. The three teams in each division played a round-robin format over the first three days. In the Championship round teams were seeded based on record and played in a fifth place game, third place game and championship game.

=== Saint Thomas Division ===
| November 18 |
| Wisconsin | 80 |
| Norfolk State | 51 |

| November 19 |
| Eastern Kentucky | 89 |
| Wisconsin | 95** |

| November 20 |
| Eastern Kentucky | 67 |
| Norfolk State | 60 |

=== Saint John Division ===
| November 18 |
| Georgia | 65 |
| Old Dominion | 74 |

| November 19 |
| Old Dominion | 65 |
| Fordham | 52 |

| November 20 |
| Georgia | 79 |
| Fordham | 68 |

=== Championship round ===
| November 21; Fifth Place game |
| Fordham | 72 |
| Norfolk State | 53 |

| November 21; Third Place game |
| Georgia | 76 |
| Eastern Kentucky | 68 |

| November 21; Championship |
| Wisconsin | 84 |
| Old Dominion | 81 |

== Women's tournament ==
Teams in the Saint Thomas division played in a 4 team tournament with a 3rd place game. Teams in the Saint John's division played a round-robin with a pair of games on the 25th; on the 26th the winners played each other and the losers played each other. The teams in the St. John's division played a round-robin, with one game each on the 25th, 26th and 27 November

=== Saint Thomas division ===
On November 25 Minnesota defeated Nevada 83–75. In the other game, Virginia defeated Alabama 69–48.

On November 26, Alabama defeated Nevada 76–46 in the third place game. Minnesota took on Virginia in the championship game and although down by two points at halftime came back to win 69–64.

Jamie Broback (Minnesota) was named MVP. The other all-stars included Tiffany Sardin (Virginia), Liz Podominick (Minnesota), Denesha Kenion (Virginia), Lauren Hill (Alabama), and Dellena Criner (Nevada)

==== Bracket ====
Semifinals; November 25
Nevada | 75
12 | Minnesota | 83
Alabama | 48
Virginia | 69

Championship; November 26
12 | Minnesota | 69
Virginia | 64
Consolation; November 26
Nevada | 46
Alabama | 75

=== Saint John division ===
Tennessee took on Michigan State on Thanksgiving day. Tennessee was ranked second in the nation while Michigan State was ranked ninth, but Tennessee won easily 83–55. 10th-ranked Maryland took on Gonzaga, opening up a 29 point lead at halftime and cruising to an 88–50 victory.

On the following day Tennessee took on Gonzaga, who shot almost 60% in the first half, but Tennessee still led by seven points at the half and expanded their lead another seven points in the second half to win 79–65. Maryland faced Michigan State in the other game. Although Michigan State held a four-point lead at halftime, Maryland came back strongly in the second half and ended up with the win, 75–61.

On the final day of the tournament, Michigan State took on Gonzaga and won, 60–45. In the game for the championship, Tennessee faced Maryland. The Terrapins held a five-point lead, 51 – 46 in the second half, but the Lady Vol's came back to take the lead. Maryland cut the lead to a single point, 76–75 late in the game but Maryland failed to score on a late possession when Tennessee stole the ball and closed out the game 80–75.

Candace Parker of Tennessee was named the MVP. The other all-stars were Shanna Zolman(Tennessee), Crystal Langhorne(Maryland), Marissa Coleman(Maryland), Lindsay Bowen(Michigan State), and Stephanie Hawk (Gonzaga).

| November 24 |
| Michigan State | 55 |
| Tennessee | 50 |

| November 24 |
| Gonzaga | 50 |
| Maryland | 88 |

| November 25 |
| Tennessee | 79 |
| Gonzaga | 65 |

| November 25 |
| Maryland | 75 |
| Michigan State | 61 |

| November 26 |
| Maryland | 75 |
| Tennessee | 80 |

| November 26 |
| Gonzaga | 45 |
| Michigan State | 60 |
