= 2006 CAA men's basketball tournament =

- Classification: Division I
- Season: 2005–06
- Teams: 12
- Site: Richmond Coliseum; Richmond, Virginia
- Champions: UNC Wilmington (4th title)
- Winning coach: Brad Brownell (2nd title)
- MVP: T. J. Carter (UNC-Wilmington)
- Television: Comcast, ESPN

2005–06 CAA men's basketball standings
	Conf.				Overall
Team	W		L	PCT	W		L	PCT
George Mason	15	–	3	.833	27	–	8	.771
UNC Wilmington †	15	–	3	.833	25	–	8	.758
Hofstra	14	–	4	.778	26	–	7	.788
Old Dominion	13	–	5	.722	24	–	10	.706
Northeastern	12	–	6	.667	19	–	11	.633
VCU	11	–	7	.611	19	–	10	.655
Drexel	8	–	10	.444	15	–	16	.484
Towson	8	–	10	.444	12	–	16	.429
Delaware	4	–	14	.222	9	–	21	.300
Georgia State	3	–	15	.167	7	–	22	.241
William & Mary	3	–	15	.167	8	–	20	.286
James Madison	2	–	16	.111	5	–	23	.179
† 2006 CAA tournament winner Rankings from AP poll

The 2006 CAA men's basketball tournament was held from March 3–6, 2006 at the Richmond Coliseum in Richmond, Virginia. The winner of the tournament was UNC Wilmington, who received an automatic bid to the 2006 NCAA Men's Division I Basketball Tournament. George Mason, who lost to Hofstra in the semi-finals of the tournament, earned an at-large bid to the 2006 NCAA Men's Division I Basketball Tournament, the CAA's first since 1986. George Mason would advance to the Final Four in the NCAA Tournament, the first CAA team to do so.

== Schedule ==
Session	Game	Time*	Matchup	Score	Television
First Round – Friday, March 3
1	1	12:00 p.m.	No. 8 Drexel vs. No. 9 Delaware	49–52	Comcast
1	2	2:30 p.m.	No. 5 Northeastern vs. No. 12 James Madison	74–56	Comcast
2	3	6:00 p.m.	No. 7 Towson vs. No. 10 Georgia State	64–71	Comcast
2	4	8:30 p.m.	No. 6 VCU vs. No. 11 William & Mary	62–59	Comcast
Quarterfinals – Saturday, March 4
3	5	12:00 p.m.	No. 1 UNC Wilmington vs. No. 9 Delaware	69–56	Comcast
3	6	2:30 p.m.	No. 4 Old Dominion vs. No. 5 Northeastern	63–71	Comcast
4	7	6:00 p.m.	No. 2 George Mason vs. No. 10 Georgia State	61–56^{OT}	Comcast
4	8	8:30 p.m.	No. 3 Hofstra vs. No. 6 VCU	72–66	Comcast
Semifinals – Sunday, March 5
5	9	3:30 p.m.	No. 1 UNC Wilmington vs. No. 5 Northeastern	69–54	Comcast
5	10	6:00 p.m.	No. 2 George Mason vs. No. 3 Hofstra	49–58	Comcast
Championship – Monday, March 6
6	11	7:00 p.m.	No. 1 UNC Wilmington vs. No. 3 Hofstra	78–67	ESPN
*Game times in ET. Rankings denote tournament seed

== Bracket ==
First round Friday, March 3
8	Drexel	49
9	Delaware	52
5	Northeastern	74
12	James Madison	56
7	Towson	64
10	Georgia State	71
6	VCU	52
11	William & Mary	49

Quarterfinals; Saturday, March 4
1	UNC Wilmington	69
9	Delaware	56
4	Old Dominion	63
5	Northeastern	71
2	George Mason	61*
10	Georgia State	56
3	Hofstra	72
6	VCU	66

Semifinals; Sunday, March 5
1	UNC Wilmington	69
5	Northeastern	54
2	George Mason	49
3	Hofstra	58

Championship; Monday, March 6
1	UNC Wilmington	78
3	Hofstra	67

=== Quarterfinal summary ===
Comcast

Saturday, March 4
6:00 PM EST

No. 2 George Mason Patriots 61, No. 10 Georgia State Panthers 56 (OT)
Pts: W. Thomas – 19; Rebs: J. Lewis – 13; Asts: G. Norwood – 4	Pts: B. Copeland, H. Favors – 11; Rebs: D. Dickerson, M. Minier – 7 Asts: H. Favors – 5 Halftime Score: George Mason, 27–25; End of Regulation: 47–47

Richmond Coliseum, Richmond, Virginia
Attendance: 6,158
Referees: Steve Gordon, Sam Croft, Mike Lindsay

=== Semifinal summary ===
Comcast

Sunday, March 5
6:00 PM EST

No. 3 Hofstra Pride 58, No. 2 George Mason Patriots 49
Pts: C. Rivera – 25; Rebs: C. Rivera – 10; Asts: C. Rivera – 4	Pts: W. Thomas – 17; Rebs: J. Lewis – 7 Asts: F. Campbell – 3 Halftime Score: George Mason, 33–27

Richmond Coliseum, Richmond, Virginia
Attendance: 5,310
Referees: Bryan Kersey, Mike Eades, Tim Nestor

== Honors ==
CAA All-Tournament Team	Player	School	Position
CAA All-Tournament Team	T. J. Carter	UNC-Wilmington	Guard
CAA All-Tournament Team	John Goldsberry	UNC-Wilmington	Guard
CAA All-Tournament Team	Shawn James	Northeastern	Forward
CAA All-Tournament Team	Carlos Rivera	Hofstra	Guard
CAA All-Tournament Team	Loren Stokes	Hofstra	Guard
CAA All-Tournament Team	Beckham Wyrick	UNC-Wilmington	Forward
