= 2005–06 Old Dominion Monarchs basketball team =

American college basketball season

2005–06 Old Dominion Monarchs basketball

NIT, Semifinals
- Conference: Colonial Athletic Association
- Record: 24–10 (13–5 CAA)
- Head coach: Blaine Taylor (5th season)
- Assistant coaches: Jim Corrigan (12th season); Rob Wilkes (4th season); John Richardson (1st season); Travis DeCuire (3rd season)
- Home arena: Ted Constant Convocation Center

2005–06 CAA men's basketball standings
| | Conf. | | | | Overall |
| Team | W | | L | PCT | W | | L | PCT |
|---|---|---|---|---|---|---|---|---|
| George Mason | 15 | – | 3 | .833 | 27 | – | 8 | .771 |
| UNC Wilmington † | 15 | – | 3 | .833 | 25 | – | 8 | .758 |
| Hofstra | 14 | – | 4 | .778 | 26 | – | 7 | .788 |
| Old Dominion | 13 | – | 5 | .722 | 24 | – | 10 | .706 |
| Northeastern | 12 | – | 6 | .667 | 19 | – | 11 | .633 |
| VCU | 11 | – | 7 | .611 | 19 | – | 10 | .655 |
| Drexel | 8 | – | 10 | .444 | 15 | – | 16 | .484 |
| Towson | 8 | – | 10 | .444 | 12 | – | 16 | .429 |
| Delaware | 4 | – | 14 | .222 | 9 | – | 21 | .300 |
| Georgia State | 3 | – | 15 | .167 | 7 | – | 22 | .241 |
| William & Mary | 3 | – | 15 | .167 | 8 | – | 20 | .286 |
| James Madison | 2 | – | 16 | .111 | 5 | – | 23 | .179 |
† 2006 CAA tournament winner Rankings from AP poll

The 2005–06 Old Dominion Monarchs basketball team represented Old Dominion University in National Collegiate Athletic Association (NCAA) Division I men's basketball during the 2005–06 season. Playing in the Colonial Athletic Association (CAA) and led by fifth-year head coach Blaine Taylor, the Monarchs finished the season with a 24–10 overall record (13–5 CAA).

The Monarchs competed in the 2005 Paradise Jam and lost to Wisconsin in the in-season tournament championship after winning their first two round-robin games. After losing to Northeastern in the CAA tournament quarterfinal, Old Dominion received a qualifying bid to the 2006 National Invitation Tournament. Playing as the No. 5 seed in the Maryland bracket, ODU proceeded to winning out the bracket after defeating Hofstra in the tournament quarterfinal. They lost to Michigan in the tournament semifinal.

== Roster ==
2005–06 Old Dominion Monarchs men's basketball team
Players
Coaches

| Pos. | # | Name | Height | Weight | Year | Previous school | Hometown |
|---|---|---|---|---|---|---|---|
| G | 3 | John Morris | 6 ft 2 in (1.88 m) | 180 lb (82 kg) | RS Jr | Trinity HS | Camp Hill, Pennsylvania |
| G | 4 | Brandon Johnson | 6 ft 1 in (1.85 m) | 182 lb (83 kg) | So | Edgewater HS | Orlando, Florida |
| G | 11 | Abdi Lidonde | 6 ft 2 in (1.88 m) | 200 lb (91 kg) | RS So | St. Andrews HS | Sutton, Massachusetts |
| G | 20 | Brian Henderson | 6 ft 4 in (1.93 m) | 200 lb (91 kg) | RS So | Varina HS | Richmond, Virginia |
| C | 30 | Sam Harris | 7 ft 3 in (2.21 m) | 270 lb (122 kg) | So | Lake Ginninderra | Launceston, Australia |
| F | 31 | Arnaud Dahi | 6 ft 7 in (2.01 m) | 235 lb (107 kg) | Jr | Life Center Academy | Abidjan, Ivory Coast |
| F | 34 | Jonathan Adams | 6 ft 6 in (1.98 m) | 215 lb (98 kg) | Fr | Baylor School (TN) | Ringgold, Georgia |
| C | 40 | Alex Loughton | 6 ft 9 in (2.06 m) | 240 lb (109 kg) | Sr | St Stephen's School | Perth, Western Australia |
| F | 42 | Valdas Vasylius | 6 ft 7 in (2.01 m) | 210 lb (95 kg) | Jr | Norfolk Collegiate | Klaipėda, Lithuania |

Head coach

- Blaine Taylor (Montana '81)

Assistant coach(es)

- Jim Corrigan (Duke '80)
- Rob Wilkes (Stetson '93)
- John Richardson (Elizabeth City State '95)
- Travis DeCuire (Montana '94)

Legend

- (C) Team captain
- (S) Suspended
- (I) Ineligible
- (W) Walk-on
- Injured
- Current redshirt

Roster

== Schedule and results ==
| Date time, TV | Rank^{#} | Opponent^{#} | Result | Record | Site city, state |
Exhibition
| Nov 2, 2005*; 7:00 p.m. | | Saskatchewan | W 82–58 | | Ted Constant Center; Norfolk, VA |
| Nov 12, 2005*; 7:00 p.m. | | Virginia State | W 96–51 | | Ted Constant Center; Norfolk, VA |
Non-conference regular season
| Nov 18, 2005*; 6:00 p.m. | | vs. Georgia; Paradise Jam tournament | W 74–65 | 1–0 | Sports and Fitness Center; Saint Thomas, USVI |
| Nov 19, 2005*; 6:00 p.m. | | vs. Fordham; Paradise Jam tournament | W 65–52 | 2–0 | Sports and Fitness Center; Saint Thomas, USVI |
| Nov 20, 2005*; 8:30 a.m., Comcast | | vs. Wisconsin; Paradise Jam championship | L 81–84 | 2–1 | Sports and Fitness Center; Saint Thomas, USVI |
| Nov 26, 2005*; 7:00 p.m. | | Mount St. Mary's | W 80–57 | 3–1 | Ted Constant Center; Norfolk, VA |
| Nov 30, 2005*; 7:00 p.m. | | at VMI | W 77–62 | 4–1 | Cameron Hall; Lexington, VA |
| Dec 3, 2005*; 7:00 p.m. | | East Carolina | W 79–53 | 5–1 | Ted Constant Center; Norfolk, VA |
| Dec 7, 2005; 7:00 p.m. | | George Mason | W 54–53 | 6–1 (1–0) | Ted Constant Center; Norfolk, VA |
| Dec 10, 2005; 3:00 p.m., WSKY4/CN8 | | at Drexel | L 42–61 | 6–2 (1–1) | Daskalakis Athletic Center (1,273); Philadelphia, PA |
| Dec 17, 2005*; 4:00 p.m., Comcast/WCIU | | DePaul | W 87–43 | 7–2 | Ted Constant Center; Norfolk, VA |
| Dec 20, 2005*; 7:00 p.m., Comcast | | at Richmond | L 58–61 | 7–3 | Robins Center; Richmond, VA |
| Dec 22, 2005*; 8:30 p.m. | | at UAB | L 57–85 | 7–4 | Bartow Arena (4,588); Birmingham, AL |
| Dec 30, 2005*; 7:00 p.m., Comcast | | Virginia Tech | W 58–55 | 8–4 | Ted Constant Center; Norfolk, VA |
CAA regular season
| Jan 3, 2006; 7:00 p.m. | | UNC Wilmington | W 64–59 | 9–4 (2–1) | Ted Constant Center (5,752); Norfolk, VA |
| Jan 5, 2006; 7:30 p.m. | | at Towson | W 85–71 | 10–4 (3–1) | Towson Center; Towson, MD |
| Jan 7, 2006; 12:00 p.m., Comcast | | Northeastern | W 85–79 | 11–4 (4–1) | Ted Constant Center; Norfolk, VA |
| Jan 12, 2006; 7:00 p.m. | | at Georgia State | W 77–62 | 12–4 (5–1) | GSU Sports Arena; Atlanta, GA |
| Jan 14, 2006; 12:00 p.m., Comcast | | VCU; Rivalry | W 78–75 | 13–4 (6–1) | Ted Constant Center (8,424); Norfolk, VA |
| Jan 19, 2006; 7:00 p.m. | | Hofstra | L 68–76 | 13–5 (6–2) | Ted Constant Center; Norfolk, VA |
| Jan 21, 2006; 7:00 p.m. | | at William & Mary; Rivalry | W 65–56 | 14–5 (7–2) | William & Mary Hall; Williamsburg, VA |
| Jan 26, 2006; 7:00 p.m. | | Drexel | W 74–67 | 15–5 (8–2) | Ted Constant Center; Norfolk, VA |
| Jan 28, 2006; 2:00 p.m., Comcast | | at George Mason | L 47–66 | 15–6 (8–3) | Patriot Center; Fairfax, VA |
| Feb 2, 2006; 7:00 p.m. | | at Hofstra | L 63–65 | 15–7 (8–4) | Hofstra Arena; Hempstead, NY |
| Feb 4, 2006; 7:00 p.m. | | James Madison; Rivalry | W 87–69 | 16–7 (9–4) | Ted Constant Center; Norfolk, VA |
| Feb 9, 2006; 7:00 p.m. | | William & Mary; Rivalry | W 81–60 | 17–7 (10–4) | Ted Constant Center; Norfolk, VA |
| Feb 11, 2006; 6:00 p.m., ESPN2 | | at VCU; Rivalry | L 74–80 | 17–8 (10–5) | Siegel Center (7,838); Richmond, VA |
| Feb 15, 2006; 7:00 p.m., Comcast/CSS | | Georgia State | W 75–56 | 18–8 (11–5) | Ted Constant Center; Norfolk, VA |
| Feb 18, 2006*; 4:00 p.m., ESPN2 | | Marist; ESPN BracketBusters | W 84–71 | 19–8 | Ted Constant Center; Norfolk, VA |
| Feb 23, 2006; 7:00 p.m., Comcast | | at James Madison; Rivalry | W 75–58 | 20–8 (12–5) | JMU Convocation Center; Harrisonburg, VA |
| Feb 26, 2006; 7:30 p.m. | | at Delaware | W 69–53 | 21–8 (13–5) | Bob Carpenter Center; Newark, DE |
CAA tournament
| Mar 4, 2006; 2:30 p.m. | (4) | vs. (5) Northeastern; Quarterfinals | L 63–71 | 21–9 | Richmond Coliseum; Richmond, VA |
National Invitation Tournament
| Mar 15, 2006*; 9:30 p.m. | (5 MD) | at (4 MD) Colorado; First round | W 79–61 | 22–9 | Coors Events Center; Boulder, CO |
| Mar 20, 2006*; 9:00 p.m. | (5 MD) | (9 MD) Manhattan; Second round | W 70–66 | 23–9 | Ted Constant Center; Norfolk, VA |
| Mar 22, 2006; 7:00 p.m., ESPN2 | (5 MD) | at (3 MD) Hofstra; Quarterfinals | W 61–51 | 24–9 | Hofstra Arena; Hempstead, NY |
| Mar 28, 2006*; 7:00 p.m., ESPN2 | (5 MD) | at (1 MI) Michigan; Semifinals | L 43–66 | 24–10 | Madison Square Garden; New York, NY |
*Non-conference game. ^{#}Rankings from AP Poll. (#) Tournament seedings in parentheses. All times are in Eastern Time. MD = Maryland bracket, MI = Michigan bracket
