= 2005–06 UNC Wilmington Seahawks men's basketball team =

American college basketball season

2005–06 UNC Wilmington Seahawks men's basketball

CAA regular season and tournament champions BCA Invitational champions

NCAA tournament, first round
- Conference: Colonial Athletic Association
- Record: 25–8 (15–3 CAA)
- Head coach: Brad Brownell (4th season)
- Home arena: Trask Coliseum

2005–06 CAA men's basketball standings
| | Conf. | | | | Overall |
| Team | W | | L | PCT | W | | L | PCT |
|---|---|---|---|---|---|---|---|---|
| George Mason | 15 | – | 3 | .833 | 27 | – | 8 | .771 |
| UNC Wilmington † | 15 | – | 3 | .833 | 25 | – | 8 | .758 |
| Hofstra | 14 | – | 4 | .778 | 26 | – | 7 | .788 |
| Old Dominion | 13 | – | 5 | .722 | 24 | – | 10 | .706 |
| Northeastern | 12 | – | 6 | .667 | 19 | – | 11 | .633 |
| VCU | 11 | – | 7 | .611 | 19 | – | 10 | .655 |
| Drexel | 8 | – | 10 | .444 | 15 | – | 16 | .484 |
| Towson | 8 | – | 10 | .444 | 12 | – | 16 | .429 |
| Delaware | 4 | – | 14 | .222 | 9 | – | 21 | .300 |
| Georgia State | 3 | – | 15 | .167 | 7 | – | 22 | .241 |
| William & Mary | 3 | – | 15 | .167 | 8 | – | 20 | .286 |
| James Madison | 2 | – | 16 | .111 | 5 | – | 23 | .179 |
† 2006 CAA tournament winner Rankings from AP poll

The 2005–06 UNC Wilmington Seahawks men's basketball team represented the University of North Carolina Wilmington during the 2005–06 NCAA Division I men's basketball season. The Seahawks, led by fourth-year head coach Brad Brownell, played their home games at the Trask Coliseum and were members of the Colonial Athletic Association (CAA).

After finishing atop the CAA regular season standings, the Seahawks won the CAA tournament to receive an automatic bid to the NCAA tournament as No. 9 seed in the South region. The team was beaten by No. 9 seed George Washington, 88–85 in OT, in the opening round.

== Roster ==
2005–06 UNC Wilmington Seahawks men's basketball team
| Players | Coaches |
|---|---|
| Pos. / # / Name / Height / Weight / Year / Hometown; G / 3 / John Goldsberry / 6 ft 3 in (1.91 m) / 185 lb (84 kg) / Sr / Vandalia, Ohio | Head coach: Brad Brownell; Assistant coach(es) Legend: (C) Team captain; (S) Suspended; (I) Ineligible; (W) Walk-on; Injured; Current redshirt; Roster |

== Schedule and results ==
| Date time, TV | Rank^{#} | Opponent^{#} | Result | Record | Site (attendance) city, state |
Exhibition
| Nov 5, 2005*; 7:00 p.m. | | Mount Olive | | | Trask Coliseum; Wilmington, North Carolina |
| Nov 8, 2005*; 7:00 p.m. | | Armstrong Atlantic | | | Trask Coliseum; Wilmington, North Carolina |
Non-conference regular season
| Nov 13, 2005*; 12:00 p.m. | | vs. Butler; BCA Invitational | W 75–59 | 1–0 | Arena-Auditorium (5,744); Laramie, Wyoming |
| Nov 14, 2005*; 8:20 p.m. | | at Wyoming; BCA Invitational | W 62–59 ^{OT} | 2–0 | Arena-Auditorium (5,389); Laramie, Wyoming |
| Nov 15, 2005*; 8:50 p.m. | | vs. Northwestern; BCA Invitational | W 56–48 | 3–0 | Arena-Auditorium (5,056); Laramie, Wyoming |
| Nov 18, 2005*; 8:30 p.m. | | at Colorado | L 54–73 | 3–1 | Coors Events Center (3,268); Boulder, Colorado |
| Nov 22, 2005*; 7:00 p.m. | | North Texas | W 70–52 | 4–1 | Trask Coliseum (5,072); Wilmington, North Carolina |
| Nov 26, 2005*; 7:00 p.m. | | at Elon | W 59–51 | 5–1 | Alumni Gym (786); Elon, North Carolina |
| Nov 30, 2005*; 7:00 p.m. | | at William & Mary | W 75–66 | 6–1 | Kaplan Arena (2,459); Williamsburg, Virginia |
| Dec 4, 2005; 2:00 p.m. | | VCU | W 60–40 | 7–1 (1–0) | Trask Coliseum (5,317); Wilmington, North Carolina |
| Dec 12, 2005*; 7:00 p.m., WPT | | at Wisconsin | L 51–54 | 7–2 | Kohl Center (17,142); Madison, Wisconsin |
| Dec 17, 2005*; 7:05 p.m. | | Coastal Carolina | W 79–50 | 8–2 | Trask Coliseum (5,454); Wilmington, North Carolina |
| Dec 20, 2005*; 7:07 p.m. | | UNC Asheville | W 68–50 | 9–2 | Trask Coliseum (5,526); Wilmington, North Carolina |
| Dec 27, 2005*; 7:00 p.m. | | College of Charleston | L 77–81 | 9–3 | Trask Coliseum (6,100); Wilmington, North Carolina |
| Dec 31, 2005*; 2:00 p.m. | | at East Carolina | L 69–82 | 9–4 | Williams Arena at Minges Coliseum (4,709); Greenville, North Carolina |
CAA Regular season
| Jan 3, 2006; 7:00 p.m. | | at Old Dominion | L 59–64 | 9–5 (0–1) | Ted Constant Center (5,752); Norfolk, Virginia |
| Jan 5, 2006; 7:30 p.m. | | at Delaware | W 71–58 | 10–5 (1–1) | Bob Carpenter Center (3,052); Newark, Delaware |
| Jan 7, 2006; 4:07 p.m. | | William & Mary | W 63–56 | 11–5 (2–1) | Trask Coliseum (5,365); Wilmington, North Carolina |
| Jan 12, 2006; 7:30 p.m. | | at Drexel | W 66–60 ^{OT} | 12–5 (3–1) | Daskalakis Athletic Center (2,083); Philadelphia, Pennsylvania |
| Jan 14, 2006; 4:07 p.m. | | at Hofstra | L 87–92 ^{3OT} | 12–6 (3–2) | Hofstra Arena (2,207); Hempstead, New York |
| Jan 19, 2006; 7:07 p.m. | | Towson | W 78–46 | 13–6 (4–2) | Trask Coliseum (5,763); Wilmington, North Carolina |
| Jan 21, 2006; 2:07 p.m. | | George Mason | W 69–63 | 14–6 (5–2) | Trask Coliseum (5,621); Wilmington, North Carolina |
| Jan 26, 2006; 7:00 p.m. | | at James Madison | W 83–46 | 15–6 (6–2) | JMU Convocation Center (3,259); Harrisonburg, Virginia |
| Jan 28, 2006; 7:00 p.m. | | Northeastern | W 46–44 | 16–6 (7–2) | Trask Coliseum (6,100); Wilmington, North Carolina |
| Feb 2, 2006; 7:00 p.m. | | Drexel | W 65–58 | 17–6 (8–2) | Trask Coliseum (6,100); Wilmington, North Carolina |
| Feb 4, 2006; 7:00 p.m. | | at George Mason | L 62–69 | 17–7 (8–3) | Patriot Center (6,733); Fairfax, Virginia |
| Feb 9, 2006; 7:00 p.m. | | Delaware | W 70–54 | 18–7 (9–3) | Trask Coliseum (5,547); Wilmington, North Carolina |
| Feb 11, 2006; 2:00 p.m. | | at Georgia State | W 69–57 | 19–7 (10–3) | GSU Sports Arena (1,303); Atlanta, Georgia |
| Feb 15, 2006; 7:00 p.m. | | Hofstra | W 77–68 | 20–7 (11–3) | Trask Coliseum (5,562); Wilmington, North Carolina |
| Feb 23, 2006; 7:30 p.m. | | at VCU | W 61–54 | 21–7 (12–3) | Siegel Center (5,888); Richmond, Virginia |
| Feb 25, 2006; 2:07 p.m. | | Georgia State | W 68–56 | 22–7 (13–3) | Trask Coliseum (6,100); Wilmington, North Carolina |
CAA tournament
| Mar 4, 2006*; 12:00 p.m. | | vs. Delaware; Quarterfinals | W 69–56 | 23–7 | Richmond Coliseum (4,968); Richmond, Virginia |
| Mar 5, 2006*; 3:30 p.m. | | vs. Northeastern; Semifinals | W 69–54 | 24–7 | Richmond Coliseum (5,310); Richmond, Virginia |
| Mar 6, 2006*; 7:00 p.m. | | vs. Hofstra; Championship game | W 78–67 | 25–7 | Richmond Coliseum (4,580); Richmond, Virginia |
NCAA tournament
| Mar 16, 2006*; 7:20 p.m. | (9 S) | vs. (8 S) No. 14 George Washington; First round | L 85–88 ^{OT} | 25–8 | Greensboro Coliseum (22,642); Greensboro, North Carolina |
*Non-conference game. ^{#}Rankings from AP poll. (#) Tournament seedings in parentheses. S=South. All times are in Eastern Time.
