= 2005–06 Hampton Pirates basketball team =

American college basketball season

2005–06 Hampton Pirates basketball
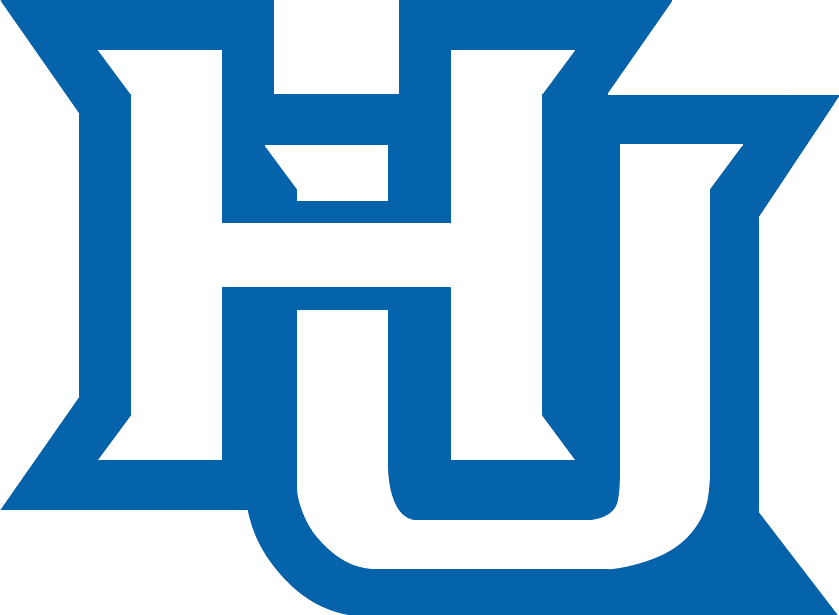

MEAC tournament champions

NCAA tournament, first round
- Conference: Mid-Eastern Athletic Conference
- Record: 16–16 (10–8 MEAC)
- Head coach: Bobby Collins (4th season)
- Home arena: Hampton Convocation Center

2005–06 MEAC men's basketball standings
	Conf.				Overall
Team	W		L	PCT	W		L	PCT
Delaware State	16	–	2	.889	21	–	14	.600
Coppin State	12	–	6	.667	12	–	18	.400
Bethune–Cookman	11	–	7	.611	15	–	15	.500
South Carolina State	11	–	7	.611	14	–	16	.467
Hampton †	10	–	8	.556	16	–	16	.500
Florida A&M	10	–	8	.556	14	–	17	.452
Norfolk State	10	–	8	.556	13	–	18	.419
North Carolina A&T	6	–	12	.333	6	–	23	.207
Howard	5	–	13	.278	7	–	22	.241
Maryland Eastern Shore	4	–	14	.222	7	–	22	.241
Morgan State	4	–	14	.222	4	–	26	.133
† 2006 MEAC tournament winner Rankings from AP Poll

The 2005–06 Hampton Pirates men's basketball team represented Hampton University during the 2005–06 NCAA Division I men's basketball season. The Pirates were members of the Mid-Eastern Athletic Conference and were coached by Bobby Collins, his fourth and final year as head coach. The Pirates played home games at the Hampton Convocation Center.

Hampton finished the season with 16–16 record and an 10–8 MEAC record. The Pirates won the MEAC tournament to earn the conference's automatic bid to the NCAA tournament. Playing as one of two No. 16 seeds in the Midwest region, Hampton was beaten by fellow No. 16 seed Monmouth, 71–49, in the Play-in round.

== Roster ==
2005–06 Hampton Pirates men's basketball team
Players	Coaches
Pos. / # / Name / Height / Weight / Year / Previous school / Hometown; G / 11 / Jeff Granger / 6 ft 3 in (1.91 m) / 195 lb (88 kg) / Sr / / Newark, NJ	Head coach: Bobby Collins; Assistant coach(es) Legend: (C) Team captain; (S) Suspended; (I) Ineligible; (W) Walk-on; Injured; Current redshirt; Roster

== Schedule and results ==
Date time, TV	Rank^{#}	Opponent^{#}	Result	Record	Site (attendance) city, state
Regular season
Nov 18, 2005*		at Richmond	L 40–44	0–1	Robins Center; Richmond, Virginia
Nov 22, 2005*		William & Mary	L 60–70	0–2	Hampton Convocation Center; Hampton, Virginia
Nov 26, 2005*		at UNC Greensboro	L 72–73	0–3	Fleming Gymnasium; Greensboro, North Carolina
Dec 3, 2005		Norfolk State	L 43–57	0–4 (0–1)	Hampton Convocation Center; Hampton, Virginia
Dec 6, 2005*		Radford	W 73–69	1–4	Hampton Convocation Center; Hampton, Virginia
Dec 18, 2005*		at Yale	L 52–71	1–5	Payne Whitney Gymnasium; New Haven, Connecticut
Dec 21, 2005*		at George Mason	L 66–79	1–6	Patriot Center; Fairfax, Virginia
Dec 30, 2005*; 7:00 p.m.		VCU	L 44–84	1–7	Hampton Convocation Center (6,087); Hampton, Virginia
Jan 4, 2006		at Bethune–Cookman	W 78–62	2–7 (1–1)	Moore Gymnasium; Daytona Beach, Florida
Jan 7, 2006		Maryland Eastern Shore	W 73–64	3–7 (2–1)	Hampton Convocation Center; Hampton, Virginia
Jan 9, 2006		Howard	W 65–48	4–7 (3–1)	Hampton Convocation Center; Hampton, Virginia
Jan 14, 2006		at Morgan State	W 80–47	5–7 (4–1)	Talmadge L. Hill Field House; Baltimore, Maryland
Jan 16, 2006		at Coppin State	L 65–72	5–8 (4–2)	Coppin Center; Baltimore, Maryland
Jan 21, 2006		Delaware State	L 58–61	5–9 (4–3)	Hampton Convocation Center; Hampton, Virginia
Jan 23, 2006*		Savannah State	W 100–57	6–9	Hampton Convocation Center; Hampton, Virginia
Jan 28, 2006		South Carolina State	W 69–57	7–9 (5–3)	Hampton Convocation Center; Hampton, Virginia
Jan 30, 2006		North Carolina A&T	W 77–65	8–9 (6–3)	Hampton Convocation Center; Hampton, Virginia
Feb 4, 2006		at Maryland Eastern Shore	W 87–75	9–9 (7–3)	Hytche Athletic Center; Princess Anne, Maryland
Feb 6, 2006		at Howard	W 75–63	10–9 (8–3)	Burr Gymnasium; Washington, D.C.
Feb 11, 2006		Morgan State	W 81–48	11–9 (9–3)	Hampton Convocation Center; Hampton, Virginia
Feb 13, 2006		Coppin State	L 72–79	11–10 (9–4)	Hampton Convocation Center; Hampton, Virginia
Feb 16, 2006		at Norfolk State	L 51–52	11–11 (9–5)	Joseph G. Echols Memorial Hall; Norfolk, Virginia
Feb 18, 2006		at Delaware State	L 77–88	11–12 (9–6)	Memorial Hall; Dover, Delaware
Feb 20, 2006*		Longwood	L 66–69	11–13	Hampton Convocation Center; Hampton, Virginia
Feb 24, 2006		at South Carolina State	W 69–64	12–13 (10–6)	SHM Memorial Center; Orangeburg, South Carolina
Feb 27, 2006		at North Carolina A&T	L 60–65	12–14 (10–7)	Corbett Sports Center; Greensboro, North Carolina
Mar 1, 2006		Florida A&M	L 65–73	12–15 (10–8)	Hampton Convocation Center; Hampton, Virginia
MEAC tournament
Mar 8, 2006*	(6)	vs. (11) Morgan State; First round	W 63–51	13–15	RBC Center; Raleigh, North Carolina
Mar 9, 2006*	(6)	vs. (3) Bethune-Cookman; Quarterfinals	W 57–55	14–15	RBC Center; Raleigh, North Carolina
Mar 10, 2006*	(6)	vs. (7) Norfolk State; Semifinals	W 73–56	15–15	RBC Center; Raleigh, North Carolina
Mar 11, 2006*	(6)	vs. (1) Delaware State; Championship game	W 60–56	16–15	RBC Center; Raleigh, North Carolina
NCAA tournament
Mar 14, 2006*	(16 MSP)	vs. (16 MSP) Monmouth; Play-in game	L 49–71	16–16	UD Arena; Dayton, Ohio
*Non-conference game. ^{#}Rankings from AP poll. (#) Tournament seedings in parentheses. MSP=Minneapolis. All times are in Eastern Time.
