= Lamar Butler =

American basketball player (born 1983)

George Mason Patriots
- Title: Player development
- Conference: Atlantic 10 Conference

Personal information
- Born: December 21, 1983 (age 42) Fort Washington, Maryland, U.S.
- Listed height: 6 ft 2 in (1.88 m)
- Listed weight: 170 lb (77 kg)

Career information
- High school: Oxon Hill (Oxon Hill, Maryland)
- College: George Mason (2001–2006)
- NBA draft: 2006: undrafted
- Playing career: 2006–2010
- Position: Point guard / shooting guard

Career history
- 2006–2007: BK Prostějov
- 2007–2008: Pertevniyal Istanbul
- 2008–2009: Colorado 14ers
- 2009: Reno Bighorns
- 2009–2010: Tofaş S.K.

Lamar Edward Butler Jr. (born December 21, 1983) is an American former basketball player and current basketball coach. He was a starting guard for the George Mason Patriots during their run to the 2006 Final Four. Lamar is currently director of player development for his alma mater.

== College career ==
Butler was featured on the cover of the March 27, 2006, issue of Sports Illustrated during George Mason's run in the NCAA tournament. After George Mason defeated top-seeded UConn 86–84 in overtime in the Regional Final, Butler was named the Washington, D.C. Regional Most Valuable Player. Throughout the tournament, he scored 13 points against Michigan State in the first round, 18 against North Carolina in the second round, 14 against Wichita State in the Sweet Sixteen, and 19 against UConn in the Elite Eight.

After the regional final, Butler and his father were in tears as they hugged at length on the court. It hearkened memories of Butler's recruiting by GMU, during which he brashly predicted to Coach Jim Larranaga that he would lead the Patriots to the Final Four.

"I think I was joking when I said that," Butler said. "I started dreaming when I got to college. It shows you anything can happen."

Butler and the Patriots then headed to Indianapolis, where they faced the Florida Gators, led by Minnesota Regional MVP Joakim Noah. To the dismay of many across the country rooting for the team leading one of the greatest Cinderella stories in sports history, George Mason was defeated by Florida in the Final Four 73–58 on Saturday, April 1, 2006. In his final game as an NCAA athlete, Butler played 36 minutes where he scored 8 points (4 of 7 FGs, 0 of 2 3PTs) had 4 rebounds, and 1 assist. He will remain part of NCAA basketball lore for the role he played in George Mason's run.

He averaged 12.0 points, 2.5 rebounds, and 2.2 assists per game during the 2005–2006 season.

== Professional career ==
Since graduating, Butler was offered to join the summer league for the Washington Wizards only to have the deal revoked. In 2007, he played with BK Prostejov in the Czech Republic for $8,000 a month.

During the 2008–09 season, Lamar played 23 games for the NBA Development League's Colorado 14ers where he averaged 15 minutes, 6 points and 2 assists per game.

On March 5, 2009, he was waived by Colorado and a few days later picked up by the Reno Bighorns.

== See also ==
- George Mason Patriots men's basketball
- 2005-06 George Mason Patriots men's basketball season
- 2004-05 George Mason Patriots men's basketball team
