= 2005–06 Drexel Dragons men's basketball team =

American college basketball season

2005–06 Drexel Dragons men's basketball
- Conference: Colonial Athletic Association
- Record: 15–16 (8–10 CAA)
- Head coach: Bruiser Flint (5th season)
- Assistant coaches: Geoff Arnold (5th season); Mike Connors (5th season); Tony Chiles (2nd season)
- Home arena: Daskalakis Athletic Center

2005–06 CAA men's basketball standings
	Conf.				Overall
Team	W		L	PCT	W		L	PCT
George Mason	15	–	3	.833	27	–	8	.771
UNC Wilmington †	15	–	3	.833	25	–	8	.758
Hofstra	14	–	4	.778	26	–	7	.788
Old Dominion	13	–	5	.722	24	–	10	.706
Northeastern	12	–	6	.667	19	–	11	.633
VCU	11	–	7	.611	19	–	10	.655
Drexel	8	–	10	.444	15	–	16	.484
Towson	8	–	10	.444	12	–	16	.429
Delaware	4	–	14	.222	9	–	21	.300
Georgia State	3	–	15	.167	7	–	22	.241
William & Mary	3	–	15	.167	8	–	20	.286
James Madison	2	–	16	.111	5	–	23	.179
† 2006 CAA tournament winner Rankings from AP poll

The 2005–06 Drexel Dragons men's basketball team represented Drexel University during the 2005–06 NCAA Division I men's basketball season. The Dragons, led by 5th year head coach Bruiser Flint, played their home games at the Daskalakis Athletic Center and were members of the Colonial Athletic Association.

== Roster ==
2005–06 Drexel Dragons men's basketball team
Players
Coaches

Pos.	#	Name	Height	Weight	Year	Previous school	Hometown
G	0	Tramayne Hawthorne	6 ft 0 in (1.83 m)	180 lb (82 kg)	Fr	Steelton-Highspire	Steelton, PA
G	1	Bobby Jordan	6 ft 0 in (1.83 m)	180 lb (82 kg)	Fr	Roman Catholic HS	Philadelphia, PA
G/F	1	Kenell Sanchez	6 ft 5 in (1.96 m)	220 lb (100 kg)	Sr	Bishop Eustace	Camden, NJ
G	3	Scott Rodgers	6 ft 3 in (1.91 m)	200 lb (91 kg)	Fr	Central HS	Philadelphia, PA
G	5	Bashir Mason	6 ft 0 in (1.83 m)	185 lb (84 kg)	Jr	St. Benedict's	Jersey City, NJ
F	10	Randy Hampton	6 ft 5 in (1.96 m)	190 lb (86 kg)	So	Dunbar HS	Washington, D.C.
G	11	Mike Radio	5 ft 10 in (1.78 m)	175 lb (79 kg)	So	Nazareth HS	Nazareth, PA
G	15	Frank Elegar	6 ft 9 in (2.06 m)	225 lb (102 kg)	So	Hargrave Military Academy	Bronx, NY
F	20	Chaz Crawford	6 ft 10 in (2.08 m)	235 lb (107 kg)	Jr	St. Raymond's	Philadelphia, PA
G	21	Jake Rauchbach (W)	5 ft 11 in (1.8 m)	170 lb (77 kg)	Jr	Pendleton School	Chapel Hill, NC
C	22	Tim Tillman	6 ft 8 in (2.03 m)	220 lb (100 kg)	Jr	Virginia Episcopal	Philadelphia, PA
G	23	Dominick Mejia	6 ft 5 in (1.96 m)	200 lb (91 kg)	Jr	NC State	Voorhees, NJ
F	25	Randy Oveneke	6 ft 7 in (2.01 m)	225 lb (102 kg)	So	Saint Anna College	Antwerpen, Belgium
F	42	Kenny Tribbett (injured) (redshirt)	6 ft 9 in (2.06 m)	250 lb (113 kg)	Fr	Chester (Pa.)	Berlin, NJ
F	44	Matt Stevenson	6 ft 7 in (2.01 m)	235 lb (107 kg)	Jr	Loch Raven HS	Towson, MD

Head coach

- James "Bruiser" Flint (Saint Joseph's)

Assistant coach(es)

- Geoff Arnold (Saint Joseph's)
- Mike Connors (Ithaca)
- Tony Chiles (Columbia)

Legend

- (C) Team captain
- (S) Suspended
- (I) Ineligible
- (W) Walk-on
- Injured
- Current redshirt

== Schedule ==
Date time, TV	Rank^{#}	Opponent^{#}	Result	Record	High points	High rebounds	High assists	Site (attendance) city, state
Regular season
November 14, 2005*; 7:30 pm		at Princeton; NIT Season Tip-Off First Round	W 54–41	1–0	18 – Meija	14 – Oveneke	5 – Mason	Jadwin Gymnasium (2,352); Princeton, NJ
November 17, 2005*; 8:00 pm		Sam Houston State; NIT Season Tip-Off Quarterfinals	W 72–61	2–0	18 – Mason	7 – Elegar	7 – Mason	Daskalakis Athletic Center (2,437); Philadelphia, PA
November 21, 2005*; 7:30 pm		Rider	W 72–60	3–0	19 – Mejia	7 – Sanchez	7 – Mason	Daskalakis Athletic Center (1,357); Philadelphia, PA
November 23, 2005*; 7:00 pm		vs. No. 1 Duke; NIT Season Tip-Off Semifinals	L 68–78	3–1	25 – Mejia	9 – Crawford	5 – Mason	Madison Square Garden (9,766); New York, NY
November 25, 2005*; 4:30 pm		vs. No. 16 UCLA; NIT Season Tip-Off 3rd Place Game	L 56–57	3–2	14 – Sanchez	6 – Tied	3 – Sanchez	Madison Square Garden (12,129); New York, NY
November 26, 2005*; 2:00 pm		at Penn; Battle of 33rd Street	L 60–68	3–3	17 – Elegar	10 – Tied	4 – Mejia	Palestra (6,241); Philadelphia, PA
November 29, 2005*; 6:00 pm	No. RV	vs. Saint Joseph's	L 59–69	3–4	16 – Mason	10 – Elegar	3 – Rodgers	Palestra (6,249); Philadelphia, PA
December 3, 2005*; 12:00 pm	No. RV	vs. La Salle; Big 5 Classic	L 50–62	3–5	18 – Elegar	13 – Elegar	6 – Tied	Palestra (7,022); Philadelphia, PA
December 7, 2005; 8:00 pm		James Madison	W 68–57	4–5 (1–0)	21 – Tied	8 – Tied	5 – Mason	Daskalakis Athletic Center (1,143); Philadelphia, PA
December 10, 2005; 3:00 pm, WSKY4/CN8		No. RV Old Dominion	W 61–42	5–5 (2–0)	27 – Mejia	7 – Tied	11 – Mason	Daskalakis Athletic Center (1,273); Philadelphia, PA
December 17, 2005*; 7:30 pm		at Fairleigh Dickinson	W 54–49	6–5	16 – Sanchez	7 – Sanchez	3 – Tied	Rothman Center (1,307); Teaneck, NJ
December 20, 2005*; 7:30 pm		Ball State	W 56–51	7–5	14 – Mejia	11 – Elegar	3 – Rodgers	Daskalakis Athletic Center (1,025); Philadelphia, PA
December 31, 2005*; 4:00 pm		at Monmouth	W 53–49	8–5	18 – Mejia	11 – Elegar	3 – Tied	William T. Boylan Gymnasium (1,421); West Long Branch, NJ
CAA Regular Season
January 5, 2006; 7:00 pm		at William & Mary	W 57–46	9–5 (3–0)	17 – Elegar	12 – Crawford	2 – Tied	Kaplan Arena (1,916); Williamsburg, VA
January 7, 2006; 7:30 pm		at Virginia Commonwealth	L 60–62	9–6 (3–1)	24 – Mejia	12 – Crawford	1 – Tied	Siegel Center (5,092); Richmond, VA
January 12, 2006; 7:30 pm		UNC Wilmington	L 60–66 ^{OT}	9–7 (3–2)	15 – Elegar	8 – Crawford	5 – Tied	Daskalakis Athletic Center (2,083); Philadelphia, PA
January 14, 2006; 1:00 pm		at Northeastern	L 60–63	9–8 (3–3)	21 – Mejia	7 – Elegar	8 – Mason	Cabot Center (2,135); Boston, MA
January 19, 2006; 7:30 pm		Georgia State	W 73–57	10–8 (4–3)	18 – Mejia	12 – Crawford	5 – Mejia	Daskalakis Athletic Center (1,023); Philadelphia, PA
January 21, 2006; 1:00 pm		Delaware	W 55–44	11–8 (5–3)	17 – Mejia	12 – Crawford	3 – Sanchez	Daskalakis Athletic Center (2,209); Philadelphia, PA
January 23, 2006; 7:30 pm		Towson	W 69–61	12–8 (6–3)	20 – Elegar	8 – Crawford	7 – Mejia	Daskalakis Athletic Center (2,012); Philadelphia, PA
January 26, 2006; 7:00 pm		at Old Dominion	L 67–74	12–9 (6–4)	34 – Mejia	10 – Sanchez	8 – Mason	Ted Constant Convocation Center (6,914); Norfolk, VA
January 28, 2006; 4:00 pm		No. RV Hofstra	L 75–76 ^{OT}	12–10 (6–5)	19 – Mason	10 – Sanchez	6 – Mason	Daskalakis Athletic Center (2,278); Philadelphia, PA
February 2, 2006; 7:00 pm		at UNC Wilmington	L 58–65	12–11 (6–6)	22 – Mason	10 – Mason	1 – Tied	Trask Coliseum (6,100); Wilmington, NC
February 4, 2006; 4:00 pm		at Towson	L 80–84	12–12 (6–7)	21 – Mason	14 – Sanchez	6 – Mason	Towson Center (2,548); Towson, MD
February 9, 2006; 7:30 pm		Northeastern	W 83–47	13–12 (7–7)	26 – Mejia	9 – Elegar	6 – Mason	Daskalakis Athletic Center (1,063); Philadelphia, PA
February 11, 2006; 2:00 pm		at Delaware	L 68–75	13–13 (7–8)	23 – Mejia	6 – Tied	3 – Mason	Bob Carpenter Center (3,458); Newark, DE
February 15, 2006; 7:00 pm		at No. RV George Mason	L 48–67	13–14 (7–9)	13 – Mejia	10 – Crawford	2 – Mason	EagleBank Arena (4,476); Fairfax, VA
February 18, 2006*; 5:00 pm		Vermont; ESPN Bracket Busters	W 56–42	14–14	17 – Sanchez	12 – Tied	7 – Mason	Daskalakis Athletic Center (1,077); Philadelphia, PA
February 23, 2006; 7:30 pm		William & Mary	W 61–56	15–14 (8–9)	17 – Elegar	8 – Elegar	7 – Sanchez	Daskalakis Athletic Center (1,157); Philadelphia, PA
February 25, 2006; 4:00 pm		at Hofstra	L 68–70	15–15 (8–10)	15 – Elegar	7 – Elegar	4 – Mejia	Mack Sports Complex (5,047); Hempstead, NY
CAA tournament
March 3, 2006; 12:00 pm	(8)	vs. (9) Delaware; First Round	L 49–52	15–16	11 – Elegar	11 – Sanchez	3 – Tied	Richmond Coliseum (2,192); Richmond, VA
*Non-conference game. ^{#}Rankings from AP. (#) Tournament seedings in parentheses. All times are in Eastern Time.

== Rankings ==
Ranking movement Legend: ██ Increase in ranking. ██ Decrease in ranking. ██ Not ranked the previous week. RV=Others receiving votes.
Poll	Pre	Wk 2	Wk 3	Wk 4	Wk 5	Wk 6	Wk 7	Wk 8	Wk 9	Wk 10	Wk 11	Wk 12	Wk 13	Wk 14	Wk 15	Wk 16	Wk 17	Post	Final
AP																			N/A
Coaches				RV															

== Awards ==
Chaz Crawford

- CAA All-Defensive Team

Bashir Mason

- CAA All-Defensive Team

Dominick Mejia

- CAA All-Conference Third Team
- CAA Player of the Week

Kenell Sanchez

- CAA All-Academic Team
