= Loren Stokes =

American basketball player

Personal information
- Born: November 12, 1983 (age 43)
- Listed height: 6 ft 3 in (1.91 m)
- Listed weight: 175 lb (79 kg)

Career information
- High school: Turner Carroll (Buffalo, New York)}; St. Thomas More (Philadelphia, Pennsylvania)
- College: Hofstra (2003–2007)
- NBA draft: 2007: undrafted
- Playing career: 2007–2012
- Position: Shooting guard / point guard

Career history
- 2007: APOEL
- 2008–2009: Aget Imola
- 2009: BC Odesa
- 2009–2010: Okapi Aalstar
- 2010–2012: Erie BayHawks

Career highlights
- Honorable mention All-American – AP (2007); CAA Player of the Year (2007); 3× First Team All-CAA (2005–2007); CAA All-Defensive Team (2005); CAA All-Rookie Team (2004)

Loren Stokes (born November 12, 1983) is an American professional basketball player from Buffalo, New York. He was a combo guard at Hofstra University from the 2003–04 season to 2006–07. He is 6'3" and weighs 175 lbs. Stokes is one of six players in Hofstra Pride history to score at least 2,000 points, amassing 2,148 points over his four-year career. A three time first team CAA player, 2004-05 all defensive CAA player, and 2006-07 CAA player of the year, Stokes was eligible for the 2007 NBA draft, he went undrafted. He was offered an invitation to play for the Orlando Magic in the NBA's summer league. Stokes was playing basketball in Cyprus for APOEL, for whom he was averaging 14.4 points per game. He has also played in Belgium and Ukraine. In early 2011, Stokes signed with the Bay Hawks and in 2012 he was traded to the Canton Charge for Keith McLeod, but was later waived due to personal issues. Loren Stokes is also the brother of Leonard Stokes who played basketball for the University of Cincinnati.

== Tony Skinn incident ==
In the final minute of a 2006 CAA tournament game, George Mason player Tony Skinn threw a punch into Stokes' groin. Skinn was later suspended for George Mason's first round NCAA Tournament game against Michigan State. Later, Skinn was Stokes' teammate during the summer league.
