= 2005–06 VCU Rams men's basketball team =

American college basketball season

2005–06 VCU Rams men's basketball
- Conference: Colonial Athletic Association
- Record: 19–10 (11–7 CAA)
- Head coach: Jeff Capel III
- Assistant coaches: Gerald White; Jeff LaMere; Mark Cline
- Home arena: Stuart C. Siegel Center

2005–06 CAA men's basketball standings
	Conf.				Overall
Team	W		L	PCT	W		L	PCT
George Mason	15	–	3	.833	27	–	8	.771
UNC Wilmington †	15	–	3	.833	25	–	8	.758
Hofstra	14	–	4	.778	26	–	7	.788
Old Dominion	13	–	5	.722	24	–	10	.706
Northeastern	12	–	6	.667	19	–	11	.633
VCU	11	–	7	.611	19	–	10	.655
Drexel	8	–	10	.444	15	–	16	.484
Towson	8	–	10	.444	12	–	16	.429
Delaware	4	–	14	.222	9	–	21	.300
Georgia State	3	–	15	.167	7	–	22	.241
William & Mary	3	–	15	.167	8	–	20	.286
James Madison	2	–	16	.111	5	–	23	.179
† 2006 CAA tournament winner Rankings from AP poll

The 2005–06 VCU Rams men's basketball team represented Virginia Commonwealth University during the 2005–06 NCAA Division I men's basketball season. The Rams played in the Colonial Athletic Association.

== Schedule ==
Date time, TV	Rank^{#}	Opponent^{#}	Result	Record	Site (attendance) city, state
Regular season
11/21/2005*; 7:30 pm		at Appalachian State	L 47–51	0–1	Holmes Convocation Center (1,787); Boone, NC
11/26/2005*; 9:00 pm		at Houston	W 62–61	1–1	Hofheinz Pavilion (4,598); Houston, TX
11/30/2005*; 7:30 pm		Elon	W 69–49	2–1	Stuart C. Siegel Center (4,296); Richmond, VA
12/04/2005; 2:00 pm		at UNC Wilmington	L 40–60	2–2 (0–1)	Trask Coliseum (5,317); Wilmington, NC
12/07/2005; 7:30 pm		Hofstra	W 87–64	3–2 (1–1)	Stuart C. Siegel Center (4,118); Richmond, VA
12/10/2005*; 7:30 pm		Richmond; Capital City Classic	W 49–37	4–2	Stuart C. Siegel Center (7,096); Richmond, VA
12/17/2005*; 7:30 pm		Charleston	W 76–71	5–2	Stuart C. Siegel Center (4,090); Richmond, VA
12/20/2005; 12:00 pm		Georgia State	W 67–54	6–2 (2–1)	Stuart C. Siegel Center (2,643); Richmond, VA
12/22/2005*; 7:30 pm		Longwood	W 91–80	7–2	Stuart C. Siegel Center (3,466); Richmond, VA
12/30/2005*; 7:00 pm		at Hampton	W 84–44	8–2	Hampton Convocation Center (6,087); Hampton, VA
01/02/2006*; 8:30 pm		at UAB	L 62–68	8–3	Bartow Arena (3,879); Birmingham, AL
01/05/2006; 7:00 pm		at George Mason; Rivalry	L 60–73	8–4 (2–2)	Patriot Center (3,005); Fairfax, VA
01/05/2006; 7:30 pm		Drexel	W 62–60	9–4 (3–2)	Stuart C. Siegel Center (5,092); Richmond, VA
01/12/2006; 7:00 pm		at James Madison	W 76–48	10–4 (4–2)	JMU Convocation Center (3,760); Harrisonburg, VA
01/14/2006; 12:00 pm		at Old Dominion; Rivalry	L 75–78	10–5 (4–3)	Ted Constant Convocation Center (8,424); Norfolk, VA
01/19/2006; 7:30 pm		William & Mary	W 69–60	11–5 (5–3)	Stuart C. Siegel Center (5,512); Richmond, VA
01/21/2006; 7:30 pm		James Madison	W 71–55	12–5 (6–3)	Stuart C. Siegel Center (7,712); Richmond, VA
01/26/2006; 7:30 pm		at Delaware	W 56–52	13–5 (7–3)	Bob Carpenter Center (3,121); Newark, DE
01/28/2006; 12:00 pm		at Georgia State	W 79–68 ^{OT}	14–5 (8–3)	GSU Sports Arena (917); Atlanta, GA
02/02/2006; 7:30 pm		Towson	W 81–75	15–5 (9–3)	Stuart C. Siegel Center (4,524); Richmond, VA
02/04/2006; 1:00 pm		at Northeastern	L 74–79	15–6 (9–4)	Matthews Arena (2,076); Boston, MA
02/09/2006; 7:30 pm		George Mason; Rivalry	L 61–73	15–7 (9–5)	Stuart C. Siegel Center (6,212); Richmond, VA
02/11/2006; 6:00 pm		Old Dominion; Rivalry	W 80–74	16–7 (10–5)	Stuart C. Siegel Center (7,838); Richmond, VA
02/15/2006; 7:30 pm		at Towson	L 57–59	16–8 (10–6)	Towson Center (1,048); Towson, MD
02/17/2006*; 7:00 pm, ESPN2		Albany; ESPN BracketBusters	W 70–67	17–8	Stuart C. Siegel Center (6,648); Richmond, VA
02/23/2006; 7:30 pm		UNC Wilmington	L 54–61	17–9 (10–7)	Stuart C. Siegel Center (5,888); Richmond, VA
02/25/2006; 7:30 pm		at William & Mary	W 77–59	18–9 (11–7)	Kaplan Arena (2,212); Williamsburg, VA
CAA tournament
03/03/2006; 7:30 pm	(6)	vs. (11) William & Mary; First round	W 62–59	19–9	Richmond Coliseum (6,912); Richmond, VA
03/04/2006; 8:30 pm	(6)	vs. (3) Hofstra; Quarterfinals	L 66–72	19–10	Richmond Coliseum (6,158); Richmond, VA
*Non-conference game. ^{#}Rankings from AP Poll. (#) Tournament seedings in parentheses. All times are in Eastern Time.
