= Bobby Collins (basketball) =

American basketball coach (born 1965)

Current position
- Title: Head coach
- Team: Shaw
- Conference: CIAA
- Record: 0–0

Biographical details
- Born: October 30, 1965 (age 60); Southern Pines, North Carolina, U.S.

Playing career
- 1987–1991: Eastern Kentucky

Coaching career (HC unless noted)
- 1994–1995: Old Dominion (assistant)
- 1995–2002: Hampton (assistant)
- 2002–2006: Hampton
- 2006–2014: Winston-Salem State
- 2014–2018: Maryland Eastern Shore
- 2018–2020: South Carolina State (asst.)
- 2020–present: Shaw

Head coaching record
- Overall: 229–249 (.479)

Accomplishments and honors

Championships
- MEAC tournament championship (2006); CIAA Southern Division championship (2011); CIAA tournament championship (2012)

Awards
- MEAC Coach of the Year (2015); Ben Jobe Award (2015)

Bobby Lee Collins (born October 30, 1965) is an American college basketball coach and the former head men's basketball coach at Maryland Eastern Shore. Prior to Maryland Eastern Shore, Collins had been the head coach at Winston-Salem State University and Hampton University.

== Playing career ==
Collins played collegiate basketball at Eastern Kentucky University from 1987 until 1991, earning All-Ohio Valley Conference Honorable Mention in his senior season. After earning his degree in business administration and management, he played one season overseas in Finland before returning to his alma mater to spend two years as an admissions counselor. In 1994, Collins took his first coaching job as an assistant to Jeff Capel II with the Old Dominion Monarchs.

== Coaching career ==
He left Old Dominion after one season to join the coaching staff at Hampton. As a part of the Pirates' staff, Collins helped a program that was transitioning to Division I upon his arrival become a constant presence at the top of the Mid-Eastern Athletic Conference. This rise to the top reached its apex with back-to-back MEAC tournament titles in 2001 and 2002. The 2001 Pirates squad pulled off one of the most memorable upsets in the history of the NCAA tournament, playing as a 15-seed and defeating the second-seeded Iowa State Cyclones in the first round.

=== Hampton ===
Following the 2002 season, Hampton's then-head coach Steve Merfeld left the school to take over at the University of Evansville. Shortly thereafter, Collins was promoted to the position as head coach, his first-ever head coaching position.

While Collins was still able to be competitive with the Pirates, he was never able to quite match the same high level of success set by Merfeld. Hampton won 19 games in Collins' first season, a school record for most wins by a first-year coach, but fell just short of a third consecutive MEAC title with a loss to South Carolina State in the MEAC championship game. The Pirates returned to the MEAC title game in 2005, but again fell short, this time falling to Delaware State. Collins was, however, named the MEAC Coach of the Year for his efforts.

In 2006, after finishing in a tie for 5th during the regular season, the Pirates made a surprise run through the MEAC tournament and won their third MEAC title, and their first with Collins at the helm. However, their 16–15 record before the NCAA tournament sent Hampton to the opening-round game in Dayton, Ohio, where the Pirates were eliminated by Monmouth. Just two days after the loss, Collins resigned as the head coach of the Hampton Pirates.

=== Winston-Salem State ===
Collins returned to his home state in September 2006 when he was hired to lead the Winston-Salem State Rams in their first season of Division I competition. In his first season with the Rams, playing as an independent with a schedule mostly of road games, Collins managed a 5–24 record. The 2007–2008 season, Collins' second with the team, marked the Rams' first season of MEAC competition. In 2010, Winston-Salem State returned to Division II, where the Rams had four-straight winning seasons and two NCAA tournament appearances.

=== Maryland Eastern Shore ===
On April 8, 2014, Collins accepted the head coaching job at Maryland Eastern Shore, returning to coaching in the MEAC with the third different team in his career.
2014–2015 "Win Today" Results:
– 100% Graduation Rate
– Best WINNING season in 41 years
– From 6–24 (.200) to 18–15 (.545): 34.5% improvement
– 3–1 (.750) in the Atlantic 10 Conference
– 11–5 (.687) in the Mid-Eastern Athletic Conference MEAC
– 2015 CollegeInsider.com Postseason Tournament (first in 30 years)
– MEAC Coach of the Year
– MEAC Rookie of the Year: Ryan Andino
– Riley Wallace National Player of the Year: Mike Myers

– The Ben Jobe Award National Coach of the Year
– The Hugh Durham Award National Coach of the Year Finalist

On March 26, 2018, Collins contract with Maryland Eastern Shore was not renewed after 4 seasons.

== Personal ==
Collins, a Southern Pines, North Carolina native, played four years for the Eastern Kentucky University Colonels and played professional basketball in Helsinki, Finland.

== Head coaching record ==
Record table
| Season | Team | Overall | Conference | Standing | Postseason |
|---|---|---|---|---|---|
Hampton Pirates (Mid-Eastern Athletic Conference) (2002–2006)
| 2002–03 | Hampton | 19–11 | 13–5 | T–2nd | |
| 2003–04 | Hampton | 13–17 | 11–7 | T–3rd | |
| 2004–05 | Hampton | 17–13 | 13–5 | T–2nd | |
| 2005–06 | Hampton | 16–16 | 10–8 | T–5th | NCAA D-I Opening Round |
| Hampton: | | 65–57 (.533) | 47–25 (.653) | | |
Winston-Salem State Rams (NCAA Division I independent) (2006–2007)
| 2006–07 | Winston-Salem State | 4–20 | | | ^{A} |
Winston-Salem State Rams (Mid-Eastern Athletic Conference) (2007–2010)
| 2007–08 | Winston-Salem State | 12–17 | ^{A} | | ^{A} |
| 2008–09 | Winston-Salem State | 8–21 | ^{A} | | ^{A} |
| 2009–10 | Winston-Salem State | 12–17 | ^{A} | | ^{A} |
Winston-Salem State Rams (Central Intercollegiate Athletic Association) (2010–2014)
| 2010–11 | Winston-Salem State | 19–8 | 12–5 | T–1st (Southern) | |
| 2011–12 | Winston-Salem State | 21–9 | 10–6 | T–3rd (Southern) | NCAA D-II First Round |
| 2012–13 | Winston-Salem State | 21–7 | 13–3 | 2nd (Southern) | NCAA D-II First Round |
| 2013–14 | Winston-Salem State | 18–11 | 11–5 | 2nd (Southern) | |
| Winston-Salem State: | | 115–110 (.511) | 46–19 (.708) | | |
Maryland Eastern Shore Hawks (Mid-Eastern Athletic Conference) (2014–2018)
| 2014–15 | Maryland Eastern Shore | 18–15 | 11–5 | 3rd | CIT First Round |
| 2015–16 | Maryland Eastern Shore | 10–22 | 7–9 | T–6th | |
| 2016–17 | Maryland Eastern Shore | 14–20 | 9–7 | 6th | |
| 2017–18 | Maryland Eastern Shore | 7–25 | 3–13 | 12th | |
| Maryland Eastern Shore: | | 49–82 (.374) | 30–34 (.469) | | |
| Total: | | 229–249 (.479) | | | |
National champion Postseason invitational champion Conference regular season champion Conference regular season and conference tournament champion Division regular season champion Division regular season and conference tournament champion Conference tournament champion

== Notes ==
^A Winston-Salem State became a transitional member of NCAA Division I in 2006 and was ineligible for postseason competition until the 2010–11 season. However, Winston-Salem State decided to return to Division II after the 2009–10 season.
