= 2006 MEAC men's basketball tournament =

- Classification: Division I
- Season: 2005–06
- Teams: 11
- Site: RBC Center; Raleigh, North Carolina
- Champions: Hampton (3rd title)
- Winning coach: Bobby Collins (1st title)
- MVP: Rashad West (Hampton)

2005–06 MEAC men's basketball standings
	Conf.				Overall
Team	W		L	PCT	W		L	PCT
Delaware State	16	–	2	.889	21	–	14	.600
Coppin State	12	–	6	.667	12	–	18	.400
Bethune–Cookman	11	–	7	.611	15	–	15	.500
South Carolina State	11	–	7	.611	14	–	16	.467
Hampton †	10	–	8	.556	16	–	16	.500
Florida A&M	10	–	8	.556	14	–	17	.452
Norfolk State	10	–	8	.556	13	–	18	.419
North Carolina A&T	6	–	12	.333	6	–	23	.207
Howard	5	–	13	.278	7	–	22	.241
Maryland Eastern Shore	4	–	14	.222	7	–	22	.241
Morgan State	4	–	14	.222	4	–	26	.133
† 2006 MEAC tournament winner Rankings from AP Poll

The 2006 Mid-Eastern Athletic Conference men's basketball tournament took place on March 7–11, 2006, at the RBC Center in Raleigh, North Carolina. Hampton defeated Delaware State, 60–56 in the championship game, to capture its third MEAC Tournament title. The Pirates earned an automatic bid to the 2005 NCAA tournament as No. 16 seed in the Minneapolis region. In the play-in round they fell to fellow No. 16 seed Monmouth 71–49.

== Format ==
All eleven conference members participated, with the top 5 teams receiving a bye to the quarterfinal round. After seeds 6 through 11 completed games in the first round, teams were re-seeded. The lowest remaining seed was slotted against the top seed, next lowest remaining faced the #2 seed, and third lowest remaining seed squared off against the #3 seed.

== Bracket ==
First round Tuesday-Wednesday, March 7–8
8	North Carolina A&T	52
9	Howard	62
6	Hampton	63
11	Morgan State	51
7	Norfolk State	73
10	Maryland Eastern Shore	71

Quarterfinals; Wednesday-Thursday, March 8–9
1	Delaware State	59
9	Howard	47
4	South Carolina State	60
5	Florida A&M	52
6	Hampton	57
3	Bethune–Cookman	55
2	Coppin State	67
7	Norfolk State	79

Semifinals; Friday, March 10
1	Delaware State	63
4	South Carolina State	51
6	Hampton	73
7	Norfolk State	56

Final; Saturday, March 11
1	Delaware State	56
6	Hampton	60
