= Tony Skinn =

American basketball player and coach (born 1983)

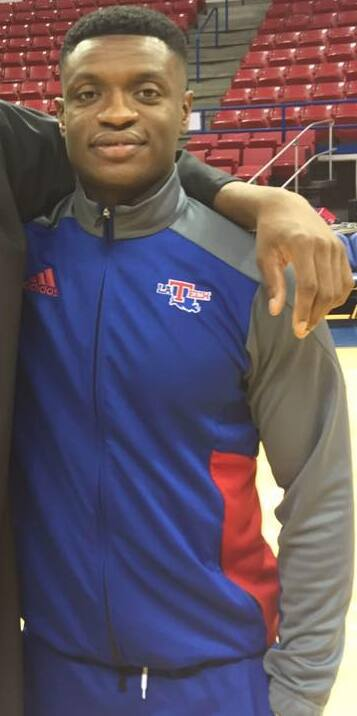
- Skinn in 2017

George Mason Patriots
- Title: Head coach
- League: Atlantic 10 Conference

Personal information
- Born: February 8, 1983 (age 43) Lagos, Nigeria
- Listed height: 6 ft 1 in (1.85 m)
- Listed weight: 175 lb (79 kg)

Career information
- High school: Takoma Academy (Takoma Park, Maryland)
- College: Blinn College (2001–2002); George Mason (2003–2006)
- NBA draft: 2006: undrafted
- Playing career: 2006–2012
- Position: Point guard / shooting guard
- Coaching career: 2012–present

Career history

Playing
- 2006: Split
- 2007–2008: Clermont
- 2008–2009: Gravelines
- 2009–2010: Pistoia Basket
- 2010–2011: New Yorker Phantoms
- 2011–2012: Ironi Ashkelon
- 2012: Budivelnyk Kyiv

Coaching
- 2012–2015: NIKE Team Takeover (assistant)
- 2015–2018: Louisiana Tech (assistant)
- 2018–2021: Seton Hall (assistant)
- 2021–2022: Ohio State (assistant)
- 2022–2023: Maryland (assistant)
- 2023–present: George Mason

Career highlights
- As player: Second-team All-CAA (2006); Third-team All-CAA (2005); As coach: Atlantic 10 regular season champion (2025); Atlantic 10 Coach of the Year (2025)

Tony Oludewa Skinn (born February 8, 1983) is a Nigerian–American basketball coach and former player. He is currently the head coach for his alma mater, George Mason University. He played guard for the Patriots from 2003 to 2006, and later played professionally for six years.

== Early life ==
Born in Lagos, Nigeria, Skinn migrated with his family to the United States at the age of two.

== College career ==
In his senior season, Skinn averaged 12.6 points, 3.5 rebounds, and 2.8 assists per game. The season was marked by the Patriots' surprising run to the Final Four. He scored a season-high 23 points and hit the game-winning three-point shot with 10.8 seconds left, in GMU's ESPN BracketBusters game against Wichita State on February 18, 2006, ultimately landing the Patriots in the USA Today/ESPN Top 25 for the first time in school history. The Patriots posted a 23–7 record during the regular season, and while they did not win the 2006 CAA men's basketball tournament title, they were awarded the program's first at-large bid as an 11 seed.

Skinn generated controversy when he punched opposing guard Loren Stokes in the groin with 55 seconds left in GMU's game against Hofstra in the semifinals of Colonial Athletic Association conference tournament. GMU lost the game, 58-49 but GMU was awarded the 11th seed in the Washington, D.C. regional of the 2006 NCAA Men's Division I Basketball Tournament. Skinn served a one-game suspension for the Stokes incident, and watched as his teammates upset sixth seed Michigan State, 75–65.

In GMU's run to the Final Four, Skinn scored eight points against defending champion North Carolina in the second round, 14 points in a rematch against Wichita State in the Sweet Sixteen, 10 points against top-seeded UConn in the Elite Eight, and 14 points against eventual back-to-back tournament winners Florida Gators.

After GMU's Elite Eight victory, Skinn told reporters that Coach Jim Larrañaga fired up his players by telling them that UConn's players did not even know what conference the Patriots came from. "That's a little bit of disrespect," Skinn recounted. "Coach told us the CAA stands for the 'Connecticut Assassin Association'."

== Professional career ==
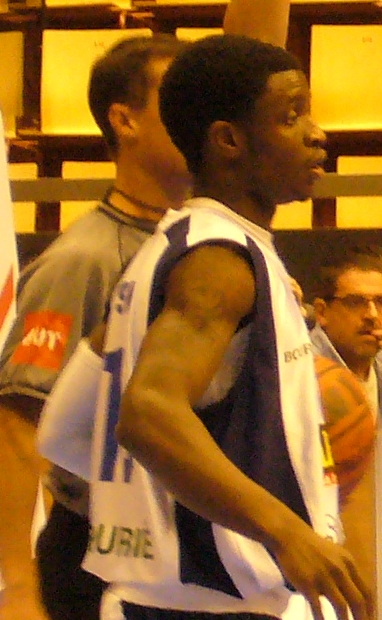
Skinn in 2007

In 2006, Skinn signed a contract to play with the Croatian club Split, of the Adriatic League, after he wasn't drafted in the 2006 NBA draft.

In July 2007, Skinn was invited to play for the Orlando Magic at the Orlando Summer League. In July 2008, he signed with Gravelines Dunkerque Basket in the French Pro A league, recording team-highs of 16.6 points per game, 3.8 assists per game, and shooting 43% from 3PT range.

On August 5, 2009, he signed with Pistoia Basket of the Italian Second Division. On October 1, 2010, Skinn signed with the New Yorker Phantoms of the German League. He then played with Ironi Ashkelon in the Israeli League.

=== Nigerian national team ===
On July 8, 2012, the Nigerian national basketball team defeated the Dominican Republic, to earn the last spot in the 2012 Summer Olympics. As the starting point guard for the team, Skinn averaged 10.0 points per game in the FIBA Olympic qualifiers. In the game against the United States national team, Nigeria lost the game by 83 points, 156–73. It was the largest deficit by a losing team and a new Olympic record for most points scored in a game by the United States. While the Nigerian national team's performance was less than favorable, Skinn was the catalyst for arguably the most memorable highlight during the 2012 Olympic tournament against the United States' guard James Harden.

== Coaching career ==
=== Assistant coach ===
After spending three seasons as an assistant coach for the Louisiana Tech Bulldogs men's basketball team, Skinn was hired by Kevin Willard to be an assistant coach for the Seton Hall Pirates in the Big East Conference.

On May 20, 2021, after spending three seasons at Seton Hall, Skinn was hired as an assistant coach at Ohio State, replacing Terry Johnson.

On March 23, 2022, Skinn was hired by the University of Maryland, where he again served as an assistant to Willard.

=== George Mason (2023–present) ===
On March 30, 2023, Skinn was announced as the new head coach at his alma mater, George Mason University.

==== 2025-26 season ====
Skinn led the Patriots to a 76–74 overtime win on February 11, 2025 vs. the St. Louis Billikens, making George Mason 11–1 in conference play, the best conference start in the program's 59–year history. The team's 20–5 record at the time was also the best overall start since the 2010–2011 season, the last of Jim Larrañaga's 14 years at the school.

== Head coaching record ==
=== College ===
Record table
Season	Team	Overall	Conference	Standing	Postseason
George Mason Patriots (Atlantic 10 Conference) (2023–present)
2023–24	George Mason	20–12	9–9	T–7th	
2024–25	George Mason	27–9	15–3	T–1st	NIT second round
2025–26	George Mason	23–10	11–7	5th	NIT first round
2026–27	George Mason	4–1	0–0		
George Mason:		74–32 (.698)	35–19 (.648)		
Total:		74–32 (.698)			
National champion Postseason invitational champion Conference regular season champion Conference regular season and conference tournament champion Division regular season champion Division regular season and conference tournament champion Conference tournament champion
