= Jai Lewis =

American basketball player (born 1983)

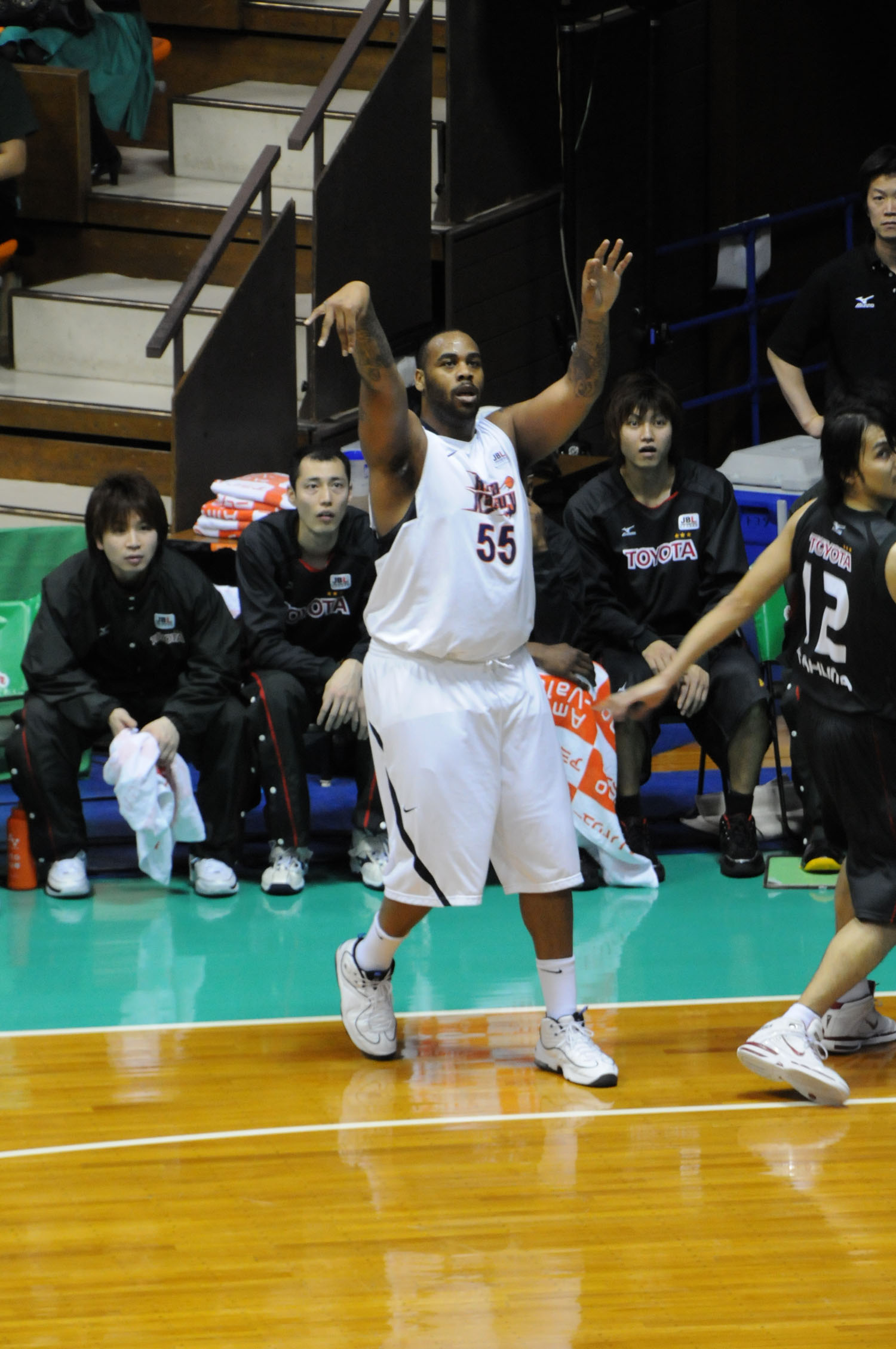

Personal information
- Born: February 13, 1983 (age 43) Aberdeen, Maryland, U.S.
- Listed height: 6 ft 7 in (2.01 m)
- Listed weight: 275 lb (125 kg)

Career information
- High school: Aberdeen (Aberdeen, Maryland); Maine Central Institute (Pittsfield, Maine)
- College: George Mason (2002–2006)
- NBA draft: 2006: undrafted
- Playing career: 2006–2013
- Position: Power forward
- Number: 55

Career history
- 2006: KK Bosna
- 2006–2007: Ironi Ramat Gan
- 2007: Strasbourg IG
- 2007–2008: Hapoel Galil Elyon
- 2008–2009: Levanga Hokkaido
- 2009–2010: Rain or Shine Elasto Painters
- 2010: Ironi Ramat Gan
- 2010–2011: Levanga Hokkaido
- 2011: Changwon LG Sakers
- 2011–2013: Levanga Hokkaido
- 2013: Once Caldas
- 2013: Sabios de-Manizales

Career highlights
- All-Japanese League First Team (2011); Japanese League Import Player of the Year (2011); Japanese League All-Star (2011)

Jai Lamar Lewis (born February 13, 1983) is an American former basketball player. He now works as a behavioral specialist in Parkville, Maryland.

== College career ==
He grew up in Germany to US Army serving parents and began to play basketball while there at the age of 6. When he turned 8 his family moved to Aberdeen, Maryland, where he played for the local Aberdeen High School. He is best known for his career in college basketball at George Mason University. A power forward, Lewis was the primary inside force for the Patriots during their "Cinderella" run to the 2006 Final Four. Lewis was selected as the 47th pick overall in the 2006 CBA Draft by the Pittsburgh Xplosion.

== NFL attempt ==
Lewis was signed as an undrafted free agent by the New York Giants of the National Football League following the 2006 NFL draft wanting to pursue a career similar to Antonio Gates and Marcus Pollard.

He ended his pursuit of an NFL career as an offensive tackle to pursue his basketball options. Although he was listed at Mason as 6'7", 275 lb (2.01 m, 125 kg), the Giants listed him at 6'5", 292 lb (1.96 m, 133 kg).

== Professional career ==
Weeks after leaving the Giants, Lewis signed with KK Bosna for $8,000 a month. Lewis was expected to play a significant role for the defending champions. However, Lewis was released from his contract in just six weeks. The team felt he was too small to play power forward in the Adriatic League.

Shortly after leaving Bosna, Lewis signed to play in Israel for Ironi Ramat Gan. The contract was for "more than $5,000 a month". In twenty-seven games, he averaged 15.4 points, 5.5 rebounds, and 1.7 steals.

Following his rookie season in Israel, Jai Lewis signed with Strasbourg IG, a French team. Just four games into the season, with Lewis averaging only 3 points on 27% shooting, Strasbourg released Lewis.

After playing for Strasbourg, Jai Lewis signed with Hapoel Galil Elyon, another Israeli team who took part in the ULEB Cup, to finish the 2008 season. He finished the season averaging 12.6 points, 4.2 rebounds, and 1.7 steals in league play. Next, Lewis played for the Rain or Shine Elasto Painters in the Philippine Basketball Association along with former George Mason University teammate Fil-Am guard Gabe Norwood.

Prior to the 2010–11 season, he returned to Ironi Ramat Gan from Israel, and played in Liga Leumit for 4 games in 2010. He then moved to Japan to play top basketball. In 2013, after playing in Colombia he retired from professional basketball.

== See also ==
- George Mason Patriots men's basketball
- 2005-06 George Mason Patriots men's basketball season
- 2004-05 George Mason Patriots men's basketball team
