= 2005–06 George Mason Patriots men's basketball team =

American college basketball season

2005–06 George Mason Patriots men's basketball

CAA regular season champions

NCAA tournament, Final Four
- Conference: Colonial Athletic Association

Ranking
- Coaches: No. 8
- Record: 27–8 (15–3 CAA)
- Head coach: Jim Larranaga (9th season)
- Assistant coaches: Scott Cherry (4th season); James Johnson; Chris Caputo (1st season)
- Home arena: Patriot Center

2005–06 CAA men's basketball standings
	Conf.				Overall
Team	W		L	PCT	W		L	PCT
George Mason	15	–	3	.833	27	–	8	.771
UNC Wilmington †	15	–	3	.833	25	–	8	.758
Hofstra	14	–	4	.778	26	–	7	.788
Old Dominion	13	–	5	.722	24	–	10	.706
Northeastern	12	–	6	.667	19	–	11	.633
VCU	11	–	7	.611	19	–	10	.655
Drexel	8	–	10	.444	15	–	16	.484
Towson	8	–	10	.444	12	–	16	.429
Delaware	4	–	14	.222	9	–	21	.300
Georgia State	3	–	15	.167	7	–	22	.241
William & Mary	3	–	15	.167	8	–	20	.286
James Madison	2	–	16	.111	5	–	23	.179
† 2006 CAA tournament winner Rankings from AP poll

The 2005–06 George Mason Patriots men's basketball team represented George Mason University in the 2005–2006 NCAA basketball season. The team achieved several milestones, including a team-record 23 regular season wins, and earned an at-large bid to that year's NCAA tournament.

In the NCAA Tournament, the Patriots reached the Final Four, becoming the first team from the Colonial Athletic Association to accomplish that feat. The number 11 seed in the East region, they advanced to the Final Four by knocking off UConn, the tournament's No. 1 overall seed, 86–84 in overtime in the Elite Eight. George Mason, which had never won an NCAA tournament game up until this tournament, thus tied the 1986 LSU Tigers as the lowest seed to ever reach the Final Four. The Patriots then lost to eventual national champions, Florida.

== Season notes ==
- On April 26, 2006, it was announced head coach Jim Larranaga had received a contract extension to keep him with the team through the 2011–2012 season.
- On March 30, 2006, Larranaga received the Clair Bee Coach of the Year Award.
- For the first time in school history, the men's basketball team was ranked on the ESPN/USA Today Coaches' Poll, coming in at #25 for the week of February 20, 2006.
- On December 27, 2005, senior guard Lamar Butler set a George Mason men's basketball record for most career 3-point field goals.
- The 2005–06 George Mason Patriots were predicted to finish 3rd in the Colonial Athletic Association.
- On September 15, 2005, it was announced that sophomore guard John Vaughan would miss the entire season due to a torn ACL.

== Awards ==
First Team All-CAA

- Jai Lewis

Second Team All-CAA

- Tony Skinn

CAA All-Defensive Team

- Will Thomas

CAA Player of the Week

- Jai Lewis – Jan. 30
- Tony Skinn – Feb. 20

== Recap ==
The Patriots enjoyed their best season in 2005–2006 when they won a school-record 23 games in the regular season, and for one week were even ranked in the USA Today/ESPN Top 25 for the first time in school history. Head coach Jim Larranaga, who began his stint at George Mason in 1997, also became the CAA's all-time leader in coaching victories and was named the winner of the 2006 Clair Bee Coach of the Year Award on March 31, 2006, and the Virginia Coach of the Year on June 26, 2006, the same day he was nominated for an ESPY award. Although the team lost to Hofstra during the CAA tournament, George Mason were still able to grab an at-large bid to the NCAA tournament. This marks the first time in which the Patriots earned an at-large bid and the first time in 20 years in which the CAA sent two teams to the tournament (the other being conference tournament winner UNC Wilmington).

The Patriots entered the tournament as an 11th seed and defeated the 6th seeded Michigan State Spartans, who had played in the previous year's Final Four.

In their second round matchup against the defending champion North Carolina Tar Heels, the Patriots were once again underdogs. After falling in a 16–2 hole early in the game, the team was able to bounce back and win the game, 65–60. Their next game was against another mid-major, the Wichita State Shockers. George Mason jumped out to a big early lead, and the Shockers were not able to overcome. The Patriots won, 63–55.

Their Elite Eight matchup found themselves facing the Connecticut Huskies, a team that was tabbed as the favorite to win the national championship the entire season. The Patriots were able to defeat the top-seeded Huskies, 86–84 in overtime, in what is recognized as one of the most memorable games in tournament history. Their tournament run would end in Indianapolis, in a Final Four matchup with the Florida Gators, the eventual national champion in both 2006 and 2007 (with the same starting lineup both years).

The Patriots were the first team out of the CAA to reach the Final Four and also became the second team to reach it as a double-digit (11th) seed (the other being the LSU Tigers in 1986, also an 11th seed).

George Mason's Cinderella story ended in Indianapolis, when the eventual National Champion Florida Gators defeated them 73–58 on April 1, 2006. Despite their loss, many sports analysts considered their performance in the 2006 tourney to be the best run by a mid-major in tournament history. In the final rankings of 2005–2006 season, the USA Today/ESPN poll ranked the Patriots eighth in the nation—their highest rank to date.

Mason was atypical of recent Final Four teams not only in being a true mid-major, but also in their unusual scoring balance. The Patriots had five players average in double figures, making them one of only six Final Four teams in the 10 seasons from 1998 to 1999 through 2007–08 with that distinction. (Two of the other five teams in this club are Florida's back-to-back national champions in 2006 and 2007.)

== Roster ==
2005–06 George Mason Patriots men's basketball team
Players
Coaches

Pos.	#	Name	Height	Weight	Year	Previous school	Hometown
G	22	Lamar Butler	6 ft 2 in (1.88 m)	170 lb (77 kg)	RS Sr	Oxon Hill	Fort Washington, Maryland
G	12	Tim Burns	6 ft 3 in (1.91 m)	185 lb (84 kg)	Jr	Worcester Academy	Greenfield, Massachusetts
G	42	Folarin Campbell	6 ft 4 in (1.93 m)	205 lb (93 kg)	So	Springbrook	Silver Spring, Maryland
G	2	Jordan Carter	6 ft 0 in (1.83 m)	175 lb (79 kg)	So	Brebeuf	Indianapolis, Indiana
F	40	Chris Fleming	6 ft 7 in (2.01 m)	240 lb (109 kg)	Fr	Osbourn Park	Manassas, Virginia
F	3	Makan Konate	6 ft 7 in (2.01 m)	215 lb (98 kg)	Jr	Worcester Academy	Mali
F	55	Jai Lewis	6 ft 7 in (2.01 m)	275 lb (125 kg)	Sr	Aberdeen	Aberdeen, Maryland
G	24	Charles Makings	6 ft 2 in (1.88 m)	210 lb (95 kg)	Jr	St. John's College	Silver Spring, Maryland
F	5	Gabe Norwood	6 ft 5 in (1.96 m)	190 lb (86 kg)	Jr	State College	State College, Pennsylvania
G	1	Tony Skinn	6 ft 1 in (1.85 m)	175 lb (79 kg)	Sr	Takoma Academy	Takoma Park, Maryland
F	34	Will Thomas	6 ft 7 in (2.01 m)	230 lb (104 kg)	So	Mount Saint Joseph's	Baltimore, Maryland
F	13	Jesús Urbina (injured)	6 ft 7 in (2.01 m)	235 lb (107 kg)	Jr	Amelia Academy	Barquisimeto, Venezuela
G	23	John Vaughan (injured)	6 ft 3 in (1.91 m)	179 lb (81 kg)	So	Laurel	Laurel, Maryland

Head coach

- Jim Larrañaga (Providence)

Assistant coach(es)

- Scott Cherry (North Carolina)
- James Johnson (Ferrum)
- Chris Caputo (Westfield)

Legend

- (C) Team captain
- (S) Suspended
- (I) Ineligible
- (W) Walk-on
- Injured
- Current redshirt

Roster
Last update: 2010-07-27

== Stats ==
Player	GP	GS	MPG	FG%	3FG%	FT%	RPG	APG	SPG	BPG	PPG
Jai Lewis	35	–	30.4	.523	.348	.651	7.8	1.8	1.4	.7	13.7
Tony Skinn	34	–	31.6	.396	.339	.802	3.5	2.8	1.6	.0	12.6
Lamar Butler	35	–	31.9	.454	.378	.733	2.5	2.2	.9	.2	11.9
Will Thomas	35	–	31.9	.580	.000	.516	7.2	1.1	.7	.7	11.8
Folarin Campbell	35	–	31.1	.491	.343	.761	4.2	3.4	.7	.7	11.0
Gabe Norwood	35	–	21.1	.425	.375	.588	2.0	1.9	.9	.7	3.4
Sammy Hernandez	35	–	11.1	.518	.375	.278	3.1	.5	.2	.3	2.8
Tim Burns	20	–	6.0	.400	.400	.000	.5	.4	.3	.0	1.8
Jordan Carter	28	–	6.5	.524	.364	.333	.7	.7	.5	.0	1.0
Chris Fleming	28	–	4.7	.440	.000	.500	.7	.0	.1	.2	1.0
Makan Konate	11	–	2.2	.167	.000	.000	.4	.0	.0	.0	.2
Charles Makings	13	–	2.5	.250	.000	.000	.7	.2	.2	.0	.2

== Schedule ==
Date time, TV	Rank^{#}	Opponent^{#}	Result	Record	Site city, state
November 6*; 7:00 p.m.		St. Francis Xavier; Exhibition	W 99–70		Patriot Center; Fairfax, Virginia
November 10*; 7:00 p.m.		vs. UC Irvine; Coaches vs. Cancer Classic	W 79–56	1–0	Joel Coliseum (14,665); Winston-Salem, North Carolina
November 11*; 7:00 p.m.		vs. No. 18 Wake Forest; Coaches vs. Cancer Classic	L 78–83 ^{OT}	1–1	Joel Coliseum (14,665); Winston-Salem, North Carolina
November 22*; 7:00 p.m.		Creighton	L 52–72	1–2	Patriot Center (3,119); Fairfax, Virginia
November 26*; 7:00 p.m.		at Manhattan	W 72–66	2–2	Draddy Gymnasium (1,979); The Bronx, New York
December 2; 7:00 p.m.		at Georgia State	W 81–51	3–2 (1–0)	GSU Sports Arena (1,332); Atlanta
December 5*; 4:30 p.m.		vs. American; BB&T Classic	W 75–35	4–2	Verizon Center (11,712); Washington, D.C.
December 7; 7:00 p.m.		at Old Dominion	L 53–54	4–3 (1–1)	Ted Constant Convocation Center (6,475); Norfolk, Virginia
December 10*; 5:00 p.m.		Radford	W 81–69	5–3	Patriot Center (3,328); Fairfax, Virginia
December 21*; 7:00 p.m.		Hampton	W 79–66	6–3	Patriot Center (2,771); Fairfax, Virginia
December 27*; 2:00 p.m.		Holy Cross	W 71–38	7–3	Patriot Center (3,501); Fairfax, Virginia
December 30*; 7:00 p.m.		at Mississippi State	L 61–63	7–4	Humphrey Coliseum (9,094); Starkville, Mississippi
January 2; 5:30 p.m.		at Northeastern	W 71–68	8–4 (2–1)	Matthews Arena (1,206); Boston
January 5; 3:00 p.m.		VCU; Rivalry	W 73–60	9–4 (3–1)	Patriot Center (3,005); Fairfax, Virginia
January 7; 4:30 p.m.		Delaware	W 70–56	10–4 (4–1)	Patriot Center (2,774); Fairfax, Virginia
January 12; 7:00 p.m.		at William & Mary	W 65–46	11–4 (5–1)	Kaplan Arena (2,024); Williamsburg, Virginia
January 14; 2:00 p.m.		at James Madison	W 65–43	12–4 (6–1)	JMU Convocation Center (3,531); Harrisonburg, Virginia
January 19; 7:00 p.m.		Northeastern	W 74–63	13–4 (7–1)	Patriot Center (3,312); Fairfax, Virginia
January 21; 8:00 p.m.		at UNC-Wilmington	L 63–69	13–5 (7–2)	Trask Coliseum (5,621); Wilmington, North Carolina
January 26; 8:00 p.m.		William & Mary	W 81–58	14–5 (8–2)	Patriot Center (4,394); Fairfax, Virginia
January 28; 2:00 p.m.		Old Dominion	W 66–47	15–5 (9–2)	Patriot Center (6,627); Fairfax, Virginia
February 2; 7:00 p.m.		at Delaware	W 57–52	16–5 (10–2)	Bob Carpenter Center (3,085); Newark, Delaware
February 4; 7:00 p.m.		UNC-Wilmington	W 69–62	17–5 (11–2)	Patriot Center (6,733); Fairfax, Virginia
February 9; 7:00 p.m.		at VCU	W 73–61	18–5 (12–2)	Stuart C. Siegel Center (6,212); Richmond, Virginia
February 11; 4:00 p.m.		Towson; Homecoming	W 65–53	19–5 (13–2)	Patriot Center (6,443); Fairfax, Virginia
February 15; 7:00 p.m.		Drexel	W 67–48	20–5 (14–2)	Patriot Center (4,476); Fairfax, Virginia
February 18*; 8:00 p.m., ESPN2		at Wichita State; ESPN Bracket Busters	W 70–67	21–5	Charles Koch Arena (10,478); Wichita, Kansas
February 23; 7:00 p.m.		at Hofstra	L 66–77	21–6 (14–3)	Hofstra Arena (4,210); Hempstead, New York
February 25; 7:00 p.m.		James Madison	W 61–56	22–6 (15–3)	Patriot Center (8,448); Fairfax, Virginia
2006 CAA men's basketball tournament
March 4; 7:00 p.m.	(2)	vs. (10) Georgia State; Quarterfinals	W 61–56 ^{OT}	23–6	Richmond Coliseum (NA); Richmond, Virginia
March 5; 6:00 p.m.	(2)	vs. (3) Hofstra; Semifinals	L 49–58	23–7	Richmond Coliseum (5,310); Richmond, Virginia
2006 NCAA Division I men's basketball tournament
March 17*; 7:10 p.m., CBS	(11 W)	vs. (6 W) Michigan State; First Round	W 75–65	24–7	University of Dayton Arena (12,495); Dayton, Ohio
March 19*; 2:20 p.m., CBS	(11 W)	vs. (3 W) No. 10 North Carolina; Second Round	W 65–60	25–7	University of Dayton Arena (12,945); Dayton, Ohio
March 24*; 7:27 p.m., CBS	(11 W)	vs. (7 W) Wichita State; Sweet Sixteen	W 63–55	26–7	Verizon Center (NA); Washington, D.C.
March 26*; 2:40 p.m., CBS	(11 W)	vs. (1 W) No. 2 Connecticut; Elite Eight	W 86–84 ^{OT}	27–7	Verizon Center (19,718); Washington, D.C.
April 1*; 6:07 p.m., CBS	(11 W)	vs. (3 M) No. 11 Florida; Final Four	L 58–73	27–8	RCA Dome (43,822); Indianapolis, Indiana
*Non-conference game. ^{#}Rankings from AP Poll. (#) Tournament seedings in parentheses. All times are in Eastern Time.

== Recruits ==
The following is a list of commitments George Mason received for the 2006–07 season:

- Louis Birdsong
- Darryl Monroe
- Dre Smith
