= Hap Spuhler =

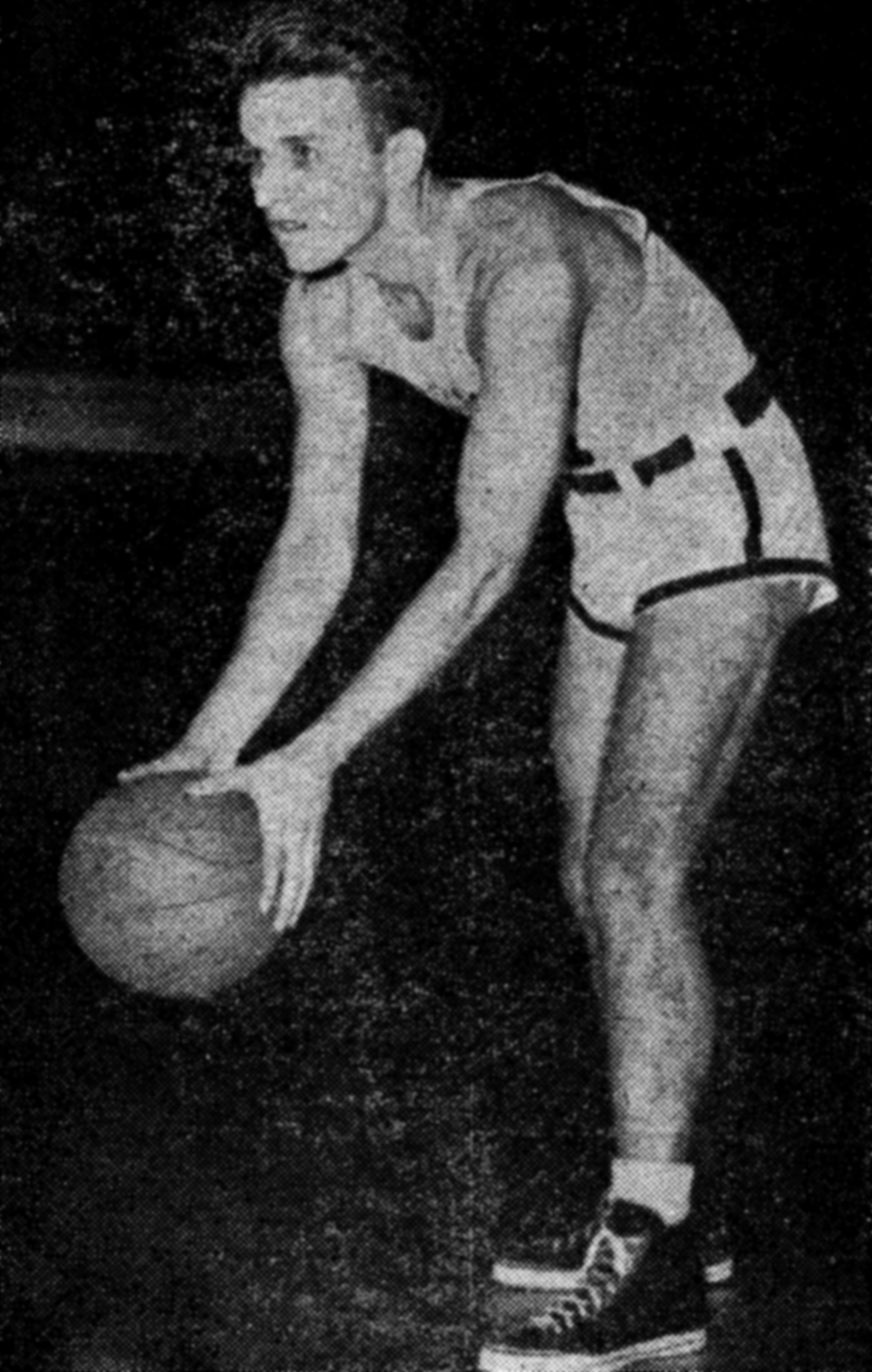
- Spuhler playing for Duke in 1942

Biographical details
- Born: December 1, 1918
- Died: November 26, 1982 (aged 63); Albuquerque, New Mexico, U.S.

Playing career

Basketball
- 1940–1942: Duke

Coaching career (HC unless noted)

Baseball
- 1967–1979: George Mason

Basketball
- 1967–1970: George Mason

Administrative career (AD unless noted)
- 1967–1979: George Mason

Raymond H. "Hap" Spuhler (December 1, 1918 – November 26, 1982) was an American college head baseball coach and athletic director at George Mason for 12 years. He also served as men's basketball coach of the Patriots for three seasons.

Spuhler played basketball at Duke, serving as captain of a team that won the 1942 Southern Conference men's basketball tournament.

He served for 23 in the US Marines, reaching the rank of lieutenant colonel. He then spent two years as athletic director at St. Stephen's Episcopal School in Austin, Texas before joining George Mason. He led the Patriots' transition from NAIA to NCAA Division I, including the introduction of athletic scholarships, during his tenure. In baseball, the Patriots only losing season was his first, and they appeared three times in the NAIA Playoffs, including a fifth-place finish in the NAIA World Series in 1976. He compiled a 316–171–3 record in baseball.

He left George Mason after a cancer diagnosis in 1979 and moved to New Mexico. He died in Albuquerque, New Mexico and was interred at Santa Fe National Cemetery. The Patriots' home baseball stadium, Hap Spuhler Field is named in his honor.
