= Temple Owls men's basketball statistical leaders =

List of statistical leaders on the Temple Owls (Temple University) men's basketball team

The Temple Owls men's basketball statistical leaders are individual statistical leaders of the Temple Owls men's basketball program in various categories, including points, three-pointers, assists, blocks, rebounds, and steals. Within those areas, the lists identify single-game, single-season, and career leaders. The Owls represent the Temple University in the NCAA's American Athletic Conference.

Temple began competing in intercollegiate basketball in 1894. However, the school's record book does not generally list records from before the 1950s, as records from before this period are often incomplete and inconsistent. Since scoring was much lower in this era, and teams played much fewer games during a typical season, it is likely that few or no players from this era would appear on these lists anyway.

The NCAA did not officially record assists as a stat until the 1983–84 season, and blocks and steals until the 1985–86 season, but Temple's record books includes players in these stats before these seasons. These lists are updated through the end of the 2020–21 season.

== Scoring ==
Career
Rk	Player	Points	Seasons
1	Mark Macon	2,609	1987–88 1988–89 1989–90 1990–91
2	Lynn Greer	2,099	1997–98 1998–99 1999–00 2000–01 2001–02
3	David Hawkins	2,077	2000–01 2001–02 2002–03 2003–04
4	Dionte Christmas	2,043	2005–06 2006–07 2007–08 2008–09
5	Mardy Collins	1,919	2002–03 2003–04 2004–05 2005–06
6	Quinton Rose	1,860	2016–17 2017–18 2018–19 2019–20
7	Terence Stansbury	1,811	1980–81 1981–82 1982–83 1983–84
8	Guy Rodgers	1,767	1955–56 1956–57 1957–58
9	Mark Tyndale	1,729	2004–05 2005–06 2006–07 2007–08
10	Nate Blackwell	1,708	1983–84 1984–85 1985–86 1986–87

Season
Rk	Player	Points	Season
1	Hal Lear	745	1955–56
2	Bill Mlkvy	731	1950–51
3	Lynn Greer	719	2001–02
4	Nate Blackwell	714	1986–87
5	Terence Stansbury	713	1982–83
6	David Hawkins	709	2003–04
7	Mark Macon	699	1987–88
8	Khalif Wyatt	697	2012–13
9	Mark Macon	683	1990–91
10	Aaron McKie	680	1992–93

Single game
Rk	Player	Points	Season	Opponent
1	Bill Mlkvy	73	1950–51	Wilkes
2	Hal Lear	48	1955–56	S. Methodist
3	Lynn Greer	47	2001–02	Wisconsin
4	Lynn Greer	43	2001–02	Fordham
	Bill Mlkvy	43	1950–51	N. Carolina
6	David Hawkins	41	2003–04	Massachusetts
7	Hal Lear	40	1955–56	Connecticut
8	Terence Stansbury	39	1982–83	Massachusetts
9	Damian Dunn	38	2022–23	Vanderbilt
	Jim Williams	38	1965–66	BYU
	Bill Kennedy	38	1958–59	Lafayette

== Rebounds ==
Career
Rk	Player	Rebounds	Seasons
1	Lavoy Allen	1,147	2007–08 2008–09 2009–10 2010–11
2	Johnny Baum	1,042	1966–67 1967–68 1968–69
3	Jim Williams	1,031	1963–64 1964–65 1965–66
4	Jay Norman	1,017	1955–56 1956–57 1957–58
5	Kevin Lyde	1,006	1998–99 1999–00 2000–01 2001–02
6	Russ Gordon	995	1959–60 1960–61 1961–62
7	Tim Perry	985	1984–85 1985–86 1986–87 1987–88
8	Lamont Barnes	851	1996–97 1997–98 1998–99 1999–00
9	Ollie Johnson	839	1969–70 1970–71 1971–72
10	Granger Hall	781	1980–81 1981–82 1982–83 1983–84 1984–85

Season
Rk	Player	Rebounds	Season
1	Bill Mlkvy	472	1950–51
2	Jim Williams	421	1965–66
3	Johnny Baum	399	1968–69
4	Lavoy Allen	375	2009–10
5	Jay Norman	372	1956–57
6	Jay Norman	346	1957–58
7	Russ Gordon	341	1960–61
8	Johnny Baum	334	1967–68
9	Russ Gordon	330	1961–62
10	Russ Gordon	324	1959–60

Single game
Rk	Player	Rebounds	Season	Opponent
1	Fred Cohen	34	1955–56	Connecticut
2	Russ Gordon	25	1959–60	Penn State
3	Joe Newman	24	1972–73	Drexel
	Jay Norman	24	1957–58	Saint Joseph’s
5	Johnny Baum	23	1968–69	Saint Peter’s
	Jay Norman	23	1956–57	Penn
7	Ollie Johnson	22	1969–70	Hofstra
	Eddie Mast	22	1968–69	Boston College
	Johnny Baum	22	1968–69	Penn State
	Russ Gordon	22	1960–61	Scranton
	Russ Gordon	22	1959–60	La Salle
	Tink Van Patton	22	1957–58	La Salle
	Jay Norman	22	1955–56	So. Methodist

== Assists ==
Career
Rk	Player	Assists	Seasons
1	Howard Evans	748	1984–85 1985–86 1986–87 1987–88
2	Pepe Sanchez	689	1996–97 1997–98 1998–99 1999–00
3	Rick Reed	564	1975–76 1976–77 1977–78 1978–79
4	Nate Blackwell	533	1983–84 1984–85 1985–86 1986–87
5	Rick Brunson	470	1991–92 1992–93 1993–94 1994–95
6	Lynn Greer	437	1997–98 1998–99 1999–00 2000–01 2001–02
7	Juan Fernandez	424	2008–09 2009–10 2010–11 2011–12
8	Shizz Alston	418	2015–16 2016–17 2017–18 2018–19
9	Mardy Collins	398	2002–03 2003–04 2004–05 2005–06
10	Josh Brown	389	2013–14 2014–15 2015–16 2016–17 2017–18
	Jim McLoughlin	389	1979–80 1980–81 1982–83 1983–84

Season
Rk	Player	Assists	Season
1	Howard Evans	294	1987–88
2	Rick Reed	208	1978–79
3	Howard Evans	206	1986–87
4	Lynn Greer	202	2000–01
5	Pepe Sanchez	201	1999–00
6	Pepe Sanchez	192	1998–99
7	Guy Rodgers	185	1956–57
8	Nate Blackwell	167	1986–87
9	Shizz Alston	166	2018–19
10	Pepe Sanchez	163	1996–97

Single game
Rk	Player	Assists	Season	Opponent
1	Howard Evans	20	1987–88	Villanova
	Guy Rodgers	20	1955–56	So. Methodist
3	Rick Reed	17	1977–78	American
4	Guy Rodgers	15	1955–56	Manhattan
	Pepe Sanchez	15	1999–00	Lafayette

== Steals ==
Career
Rk	Player	Steals	Seasons
1	Pepe Sanchez	365	1996–97 1997–98 1998–99 1999–00
2	Mardy Collins	290	2002–03 2003–04 2004–05 2005–06
3	Mark Macon	281	1987–88 1988–89 1989–90 1990–91
4	Howard Evans	268	1984–85 1985–86 1986–87 1987–88
5	David Hawkins	259	2000–01 2001–02 2002–03 2003–04
6	Rick Brunson	253	1991–92 1992–93 1993–94 1994–95
7	Quinton Rose	231	2016–17 2017–18 2018–19 2019–20
8	Mark Tyndale	201	2004–05 2005–06 2006–07 2007–08
9	Eddie Jones	197	1991–92 1992–93 1993–94
10	Lynn Greer	196	1997–98 1998–99 1999–00 2000–01 2001–02
	Aaron McKie	196	1991–92 1992–93 1993–94

Season
Rk	Player	Steals	Season
1	Pepe Sanchez	101	1998–99
2	Pepe Sanchez	93	1997–98
3	Howard Evans	91	1986–87
4	Mardy Collins	89	2005–06
5	Pepe Sanchez	86	1996–97
6	Pepe Sanchez	85	1999–00
	Mardy Collins	85	2004–05
	David Hawkins	85	2002–03
9	Mark Macon	84	1988–89
10	Rick Brunson	83	1993–94

Single game
Rk	Player	Steals	Season	Opponent
1	Mark Macon	11	1988–89	Notre Dame
2	Mardy Collins	9	2004–05	South Carolina
	Pepe Sanchez	9	1999–00	Maryland
4	Pepe Sanchez	8	1997–98	Penn
	Pepe Sanchez	8	1998–99	Michigan State

== Blocks ==
Career
Rk	Player	Blocks	Seasons
1	Tim Perry	392	1984–85 1985–86 1986–87 1987–88
2	Kevin Lyde	219	1998–99 1999–00 2000–01 2001–02
3	Lavoy Allen	213	2007–08 2008–09 2009–10 2010–11
4	Lamont Barnes	211	1996–97 1997–98 1998–99 1999–00
5	Duane Causewell	203	1987–88 1988–89 1989–90
6	Mark Strickland	177	1989–90 1990–91 1991–92
7	Obi Enechionyia	170	2014–15 2015–16 2016–17 2017–18
8	Keith Butler	151	2002–03 2003–04 2004–05
9	Sergio Olmos	123	2005–06 2006–07 2007–08 2008–09
10	Rahlir Hollis-Jefferson	108	2009–10 2010–11 2011–12 2012–13

Season
Rk	Player	Blocks	Season
1	Duane Causewell	124	1988–89
2	Tim Perry	123	1985–86
3	Tim Perry	118	1987–88
4	Tim Perry	116	1986–87
5	Lamont Barnes	74	1997–98
6	Mark Strickland	73	1991–92
7	Mark Strickland	72	1990–91
8	Kevin Lyde	71	2000–01
9	Keith Butler	64	2002–03
10	Lavoy Allen	61	2010–11

Single game
Rk	Player	Blocks	Season	Opponent
1	Duane Causewell	10	1988–89	Penn State
	Duane Causewell	10	1988–89	Penn State
3	Mark Strickland	9	1991–92	Penn State
	Duane Causewell	9	1989–90	Duquesne
	Duane Causewell	9	1988–89	G.Washington
	Tim Perry	9	1987–88	Duquesne
	Tim Perry	9	1985–86	Penn State
