= 1984–85 Temple Owls men's basketball team =

American college basketball season

1984–85 Temple Owls men's basketball

A-10 tournament champions

NCAA tournament, Second Round
- Conference: Atlantic 10 Conference
- Record: 25–6 (15–3 A–10)
- Head coach: John Chaney (3rd season)
- Home arena: McGonigle Hall

1984–85 Atlantic 10 men's basketball standings
	Conf.				Overall
Team	W		L	PCT	W		L	PCT
West Virginia	16	–	2	.889	20	–	9	.690
Temple †	15	–	3	.833	25	–	6	.806
Saint Joseph's	13	–	5	.722	19	–	12	.613
Rutgers	9	–	9	.500	16	–	14	.533
George Washington	9	–	9	.500	14	–	14	.500
UMass	9	–	9	.500	13	–	15	.464
St. Bonaventure	7	–	11	.389	14	–	15	.483
Duquesne	6	–	12	.333	12	–	18	.400
Penn State	4	–	14	.222	8	–	19	.296
Rhode Island	2	–	16	.111	8	–	20	.286
† 1985 Atlantic 10 Tournament winner Rankings from AP Poll

The 1984–85 Temple Owls men's basketball team represented Temple University as a member of the Atlantic 10 Conference during the 1984–85 NCAA Division I men's basketball season. Led by third-year head coach John Chaney, the Owls played their home games at McGonigle Hall in Philadelphia, Pennsylvania. Temple finished in second place in the A-10 regular season standings, then won the A-10 tournament to receive an automatic bid to the NCAA tournament. As No. 8 seed in the East region, the Owls defeated Virginia Tech in the opening round before falling to No. 1 seed and eventual National runner-up Georgetown, 63–46. The team finished with a record of 25–6 (15–3 A-10).

== Roster ==
1984–85 Temple Owls men's basketball team
Players
Coaches

Pos.	#	Name	Height	Weight	Year	Previous school	Hometown
G	3	Nate Blackwell	6 ft 4 in (1.93 m)	165 lb (75 kg)	So	South Philadelphia HS	Philadelphia, PA
G	21	Howard Evans	6 ft 1 in (1.85 m)	—	Fr
F	30	Granger Hall	6 ft 8 in (2.03 m)	200 lb (91 kg)	Sr	Clayton HS	Clayton, NJ
F	33	Tim Perry	6 ft 9 in (2.06 m)	201 lb (91 kg)	Fr	Freehold HS	Freehold, NJ
F		Derrick Brantley	6 ft 7 in (2.01 m)	—	Fr

Head coach

- John Chaney

Assistant coach(es)

Legend

- (C) Team captain
- (S) Suspended
- (I) Ineligible
- (W) Walk-on
- Injured
- Current redshirt

Roster

== Schedule and results ==
Date time, TV	Rank^{#}	Opponent^{#}	Result	Record	Site city, state
Regular season
Nov 26, 1984*		Drexel	W 75–62	1–0	McGonigle Hall (4,003); Philadelphia, Pennsylvania
Dec 1, 1984*		vs. Villanova; Big 5	L 65–68	1–1	The Palestra; Philadelphia, Pennsylvania
Dec 5, 1984*		at Bradley	L 56–57	1–2	Carver Arena; Peoria, Illinois
Dec 8, 1984*		at Penn	W 70–57	2–2	Palestra; Philadelphia, Pennsylvania
Dec 15, 1984*		at La Salle	W 65–54	3–2	The Palestra; Philadelphia, Pennsylvania
Dec 22, 1984*		at Wake Forest	W 71–61	4–2	Winston-Salem Memorial Coliseum; Winston-Salem, North Carolina
Dec 28, 1984*		vs. Pepperdine	W 71–66	5–2	
Dec 29, 1984*		vs. Wyoming	W 66–60	6–2	
Jan 3, 1985		vs. Saint Joseph's	W 77–45	7–2 (1–0)	Palestra; Philadelphia, Pennsylvania
Jan 5, 1985		at Penn State	W 65–49	8–2 (2–0)	Rec Hall; University Park, Pennsylvania
Jan 10, 1985		UMass	W 65–39	9–2 (3–0)	McGonigle Hall; Philadelphia, Pennsylvania
Jan 12, 1985		vs. George Washington	W 62–55	10–2 (4–0)	
Jan 17, 1985		at Rhode Island	W 57–49	11–2 (5–0)	Keaney Gymnasium; Kingston, Rhode Island
Jan 19, 1985		at Rutgers	W 66–63	12–2 (6–0)	Louis Brown Athletic Center; Piscataway, New Jersey
Jan 24, 1985		Duquesne	W 82–73	13–2 (7–0)	McGonigle Hall; Philadelphia, Pennsylvania
Jan 26, 1985		at West Virginia	L 57–61	13–3 (7–1)	WVU Coliseum; Morgantown, West Virginia
Jan 31, 1985		St. Bonaventure	W 77–56	14–3 (8–1)	McGonigle Hall; Philadelphia, Pennsylvania
Feb 2, 1985		West Virginia	W 88–71	15–3 (9–1)	McGonigle Hall; Philadelphia, Pennsylvania
Feb 7, 1985		Rutgers	W 62–52	16–3 (10–1)	McGonigle Hall; Philadelphia, Pennsylvania
Feb 9, 1985		at St. Bonaventure	W 53–52	17–3 (11–1)	Reilly Center; St. Bonaventure, New York
Feb 14, 1985		Rhode Island	W 76–60	18–3 (12–1)	McGonigle Hall; Philadelphia, Pennsylvania
Feb 16, 1985		at Duquesne	L 60–71	18–4 (12–2)	Civic Arena; Pittsburgh, Pennsylvania
Feb 21, 1985		at George Washington	W 56–54	19–4 (13–2)	Charles E. Smith Center; Washington, D.C.
Feb 23, 1985		at UMass	W 50–48	20–4 (14–2)	Curry Hicks Cage; Amherst, Massachusetts
Feb 28, 1985		Penn State	W 57–51	21–4 (15–2)	McGonigle Hall; Philadelphia, Pennsylvania
Mar 2, 1985		vs. Saint Joseph's	L 66–70	21–5 (15–3)	
Atlantic 10 Tournament
Mar 7, 1985*		vs. St. Bonaventure; Quarterfinals	W 67–56	22–5	Louis Brown Athletic Center; Piscataway, New Jersey
Mar 8, 1985*		vs. Saint Joseph's; Semifinals	W 62–61	23–5	Louis Brown Athletic Center; Piscataway, New Jersey
Mar 9, 1985*		at Rutgers; Championship game	W 59–51	24–5	Louis Brown Athletic Center; Piscataway, New Jersey
NCAA Tournament
Mar 14, 1985*	(8 E)	vs. (9 E) Virginia Tech; Second round	W 60–57	25–5	Hartford Civic Center; Hartford, Connecticut
Mar 16, 1985*	(8 E)	vs. (1 E) No. 1 Georgetown; Second round	L 46–63	25–6	Hartford Civic Center; Hartford, Connecticut
*Non-conference game. ^{#}Rankings from AP poll. (#) Tournament seedings in parentheses. E=East. All times are in Eastern Standard Time.

== Awards and honors ==
- Granger Hall – A-10 Player of the Year
