= 1987 Atlantic 10 men's basketball tournament =

- Classification: Division I
- Season: 1986–87
- Teams: 10
- Site: McGonigle Hall; Philadelphia
- Champions: Temple University (2nd title)
- Winning coach: John Chaney (2nd title)
- MVP: Nate Blackwell (Temple)

1986–87 Atlantic 10 men's basketball standings
	Conf.				Overall
Team	W		L	PCT	W		L	PCT
No. 8 Temple †	17	–	1	.944	32	–	4	.889
West Virginia	15	–	3	.833	23	–	8	.742
Rhode Island	12	–	6	.667	20	–	10	.667
Penn State	9	–	9	.500	15	–	12	.556
Saint Joseph's	9	–	9	.500	16	–	13	.552
Duquesne	7	–	11	.389	12	–	17	.414
UMass	7	–	11	.389	11	–	16	.407
George Washington	6	–	12	.333	10	–	19	.345
Rutgers	5	–	13	.278	8	–	20	.286
St. Bonaventure	3	–	15	.167	5	–	23	.179
† 1987 Atlantic 10 Tournament winner Rankings from AP Poll

The 1987 Atlantic 10 men's basketball tournament was held from February 27 to March 5, 1987. Temple defeated West Virginia 70-57 to win their second tournament championship. Nate Blackwell of Temple was named the Most Outstanding Player of the tournament.

== Bracket ==
First round
8	George Washington	94
9	Rutgers	85
7	Duquesne	82
10	St. Bonaventure	65

Quarterfinals
1	#8 Temple	77
8	George Washington	69
4	Penn State	78
5	Saint Joseph's	81
2	West Virginia	74
10	Duquesne	60
3	Rhode Island	86
6	Massachusetts	76

Semifinals
1	#8 Temple	84
5	Saint Joseph's	68
2	West Virginia	80
3	Rhode Island	58

Final
1	#8 Temple	70
2	West Virginia	57

* - Overtime
