= 1985 Atlantic 10 men's basketball tournament =

- Classification: Division I
- Season: 1984–85
- Teams: 10
- Site: Rutgers Athletic Center; Piscataway, New Jersey
- Champions: Temple (1st title)
- Winning coach: John Chaney (1st title)
- MVP: Granger Hall (Temple)

1984–85 Atlantic 10 men's basketball standings
| | Conf. | | | | Overall |
| Team | W | | L | PCT | W | | L | PCT |
|---|---|---|---|---|---|---|---|---|
| West Virginia | 16 | – | 2 | .889 | 20 | – | 9 | .690 |
| Temple † | 15 | – | 3 | .833 | 25 | – | 6 | .806 |
| Saint Joseph's | 13 | – | 5 | .722 | 19 | – | 12 | .613 |
| Rutgers | 9 | – | 9 | .500 | 16 | – | 14 | .533 |
| George Washington | 9 | – | 9 | .500 | 14 | – | 14 | .500 |
| UMass | 9 | – | 9 | .500 | 13 | – | 15 | .464 |
| St. Bonaventure | 7 | – | 11 | .389 | 14 | – | 15 | .483 |
| Duquesne | 6 | – | 12 | .333 | 12 | – | 18 | .400 |
| Penn State | 4 | – | 14 | .222 | 8 | – | 19 | .296 |
| Rhode Island | 2 | – | 16 | .111 | 8 | – | 20 | .286 |
† 1985 Atlantic 10 Tournament winner Rankings from AP Poll

The 1985 Atlantic 10 men's basketball tournament was held in Piscataway, New Jersey at the Rutgers Athletic Center from March 6–9, 1985. Temple defeated Rutgers 59-51 to win their first tournament championship. Granger Hall of Temple was named the Most Outstanding Player of the tournament.

== Bracket ==
First round March 6, 1985
8 | Duquesne | 78
9 | Penn State | 64
7 | St. Bonaventure | 60
10 | Rhode Island | 55

Quarterfinals; March 7, 1985
1 | West Virginia | 66
8 | Duquesne | 70
4 | Rutgers | 69
5 | Massachusetts | 67
2 | Temple | 67
7 | St. Bonaventure | 56
3 | St. Joseph's (PA) | 52
6 | George Washington | 49

Semi-Finals; March 8, 1985
8 | Duquesne | 53
4 | Rutgers | 78
2 | Temple | 62
3 | St. Joseph's (PA) | 61

Finals; March 9, 1985
4 | Rutgers | 51
2 | Temple | 59
