= 1986–87 Temple Owls men's basketball team =

American college basketball season

1986–87 Temple Owls men's basketball

A–10 Regular Season Champions A–10 tournament champions

NCAA tournament, second round
- Conference: Atlantic 10 Conference

Ranking
- Coaches: No. 8
- AP: No. 8
- Record: 32–4 (17–1 A–10)
- Head coach: John Chaney (5th season)
- Home arena: McGonigle Hall

1986–87 Atlantic 10 men's basketball standings
	Conf.				Overall
Team	W		L	PCT	W		L	PCT
No. 8 Temple †	17	–	1	.944	32	–	4	.889
West Virginia	15	–	3	.833	23	–	8	.742
Rhode Island	12	–	6	.667	20	–	10	.667
Penn State	9	–	9	.500	15	–	12	.556
Saint Joseph's	9	–	9	.500	16	–	13	.552
Duquesne	7	–	11	.389	12	–	17	.414
UMass	7	–	11	.389	11	–	16	.407
George Washington	6	–	12	.333	10	–	19	.345
Rutgers	5	–	13	.278	8	–	20	.286
St. Bonaventure	3	–	15	.167	5	–	23	.179
† 1987 Atlantic 10 Tournament winner Rankings from AP Poll

The 1986–87 Temple Owls men's basketball team represented Temple University as a member of the Atlantic 10 Conference during the 1986–87 NCAA Division I men's basketball season.

== Roster ==
1986–87 Temple Owls men's basketball team
Players
Coaches

Pos.	#	Name	Height	Weight	Year	Previous school	Hometown
G	3	Nate Blackwell (C)	6 ft 4 in (1.93 m)	170 lb (77 kg)	Sr	South Philadelphia HS	Philadelphia, PA
G	21	Howard Evans	6 ft 1 in (1.85 m)	—	Jr
F	32	Mike Vreeswyk	6 ft 7 in (2.01 m)	220 lb (100 kg)	So	Morrisville HS
F	33	Tim Perry	6 ft 9 in (2.06 m)	201 lb (91 kg)	Jr	Freehold HS	Freehold, NJ
C	44	Ramón Rivas	6 ft 10 in (2.08 m)	250 lb (113 kg)	Jr	Pedro Albizu Campos	Carolina, PR
C	45	Duane Causwell	7 ft 0 in (2.13 m)	240 lb (109 kg)	Fr	Benjamin N. Cardozo HS	Queens, NY
F		Derrick Brantley	6 ft 7 in (2.01 m)	—	Jr
F		Darrin Pearsall	6 ft 7 in (2.01 m)	—
G		Tom Katsikis	6 ft 6 in (1.98 m)	—
G		Jerome Dowdell	6 ft 3 in (1.91 m)	—	So
F		Shawn Johnson	6 ft 7 in (2.01 m)	—

Head coach

- John Chaney

Assistant coach(es)

Legend

- (C) Team captain
- (S) Suspended
- (I) Ineligible
- (W) Walk-on
- Injured
- Current redshirt

Roster

== Schedule and results ==
Date time, TV	Rank^{#}	Opponent^{#}	Result	Record	Site city, state
Regular season
Nov 21, 1986*		at Virginia; Preseason NIT	W 79–75	1–0	University Hall; Charlottesville, VA
Nov 22, 1986*		at Villanova; Preseason NIT	W 80–73	2–0	The Pavilion; Philadelphia, PA
Nov 28, 1986*		vs. No. 5 UNLV; Preseason NIT	L 76-78	2-1	Madison Square Garden; New York, NY
Nov 29, 1986*		vs. Memphis State; Preseason NIT	W 67-59	3-1	Madison Square Garden; New York, NY
Dec 2, 1986*		at La Salle	W 70–66	4–1	The Palestra; Philadelphia, PA
Dec 4, 1986*		Drexel	W 78–58	5–1	McGonigle Hall; Philadelphia, PA
Dec 8, 1986*		Penn	W 103–67	6–1	McGonigle Hall; Philadelphia, PA
Dec 13, 1986		at St. Bonaventure	W 68–66	7–1 (1–0)	Reilly Center; St. Bonaventure, NY
Dec 15, 1986*	No. 20	No. 11 UCLA	W 81–76	8–1	McGonigle Hall; Philadelphia, PA
Dec 20, 1986*	No. 20	at Villanova	W 67–65	9–1	The Pavilion; Philadelphia, PA
Dec 29, 1986*	No. 14	vs. Georgia Southern	W 80–61	10–1	John F. Savage Hall; Toledo, OH
Dec 30, 1986*	No. 14	at Toledo	W 75–68	11–1	John F. Savage Hall; Toledo, OH
Jan 3, 1987	No. 14	at Rhode Island	W 81–68	12–1 (2–0)	Keaney Gymnasium; Kingston, RI
Jan 5, 1987	No. 8	George Washington	W 77–73	13–1 (3–0)	McGonigle Hall; Philadelphia, PA
Jan 8, 1987*	No. 8	at No. 19 Kansas	L 64–67	13-2	Allen Fieldhouse; Lawrence, KS
Jan 10, 1987	No. 8	at Rutgers	W 71–58	14–2 (4–0)	Louis Brown Athletic Center; Piscataway, NJ
Jan 15, 1987	No. 11	Penn State	W 66–49	15–2 (5–0)	McGonigle Hall; Philadelphia, PA
Jan 18, 1987	No. 11	vs. Saint Joseph's	W 70–69	16–2 (6–0)	Philadelphia, PA
Jan 21, 1987	No. 8	Massachusetts	W 72–60	17–2 (7–0)	McGonigle Hall; Philadelphia, PA
Jan 24, 1987*	No. 8	at UAB	W 67–60	18–2	Birmingham-Jefferson Civic Center; Birmingham, AL
Jan 26, 1987	No. 7	Rutgers	W 76–56	19–2 (8–0)	McGonigle Hall; Philadelphia, PA
Jan 29, 1987	No. 7	Duquesne	W 82–64	20–2 (9–0)	McGonigle Hall; Philadelphia, PA
Feb 2, 1987	No. 6	at Massachusetts	W 72–59	21–2 (10–0)	Curry Hicks Cage; Amherst, MA
Feb 5, 1987	No. 6	Rhode Island	W 87–75	22–2 (11–0)	McGonigle Hall; Philadelphia, PA
Feb 7, 1987	No. 6	Saint Joseph's	W 78–69	23–2 (12–0)	McGonigle Hall; Philadelphia, PA
Feb 9, 1987	No. 6	at Penn State	W 73–70	24–2 (13–0)	Rec Hall; University Park, PA
Feb 14, 1987	No. 6	at West Virginia	W 67–57	25–2 (14–0)	WVU Coliseum; Morgantown, WV
Feb 17, 1987	No. 5	at Duquesne	W 84–56	26–2 (15–0)	Civic Arena; Pittsburgh, PA
Feb 19, 1987	No. 5	St. Bonaventure	W 77–56	27–2 (16–0)	McGonigle Hall; Philadelphia, PA
Feb 21, 1987	No. 5	at George Washington	W 88–77	28–2 (17–0)	Charles E. Smith Center; Washington, D.C.
Feb 24, 1987	No. 5	West Virginia	L 61–64	28–3 (17–1)	McGonigle Hall; Philadelphia, PA
Atlantic 10 Tournament
Feb 28, 1987*	No. 5	George Washington	W 77–69	29–3	McGonigle Hall; Philadelphia, PA
Mar 1, 1987*	No. 5	Saint Joseph's	W 84–68	30–3	McGonigle Hall; Philadelphia, PA
Mar 5, 1987*	No. 8	West Virginia	W 70–57	31–3	McGonigle Hall; Philadelphia, PA
NCAA Tournament
Mar 13, 1987*	(2 MW) No. 8	vs. (15 MW) Southern; NCAA tournament first round	W 75–56	32–3	Rosemont Horizon; Rosemont, IL
Mar 15, 1987*	(2 MW) No. 8	vs. (10 MW) LSU; NCAA tournament second round	L 62–72	32–4	Rosemont Horizon; Rosemont, IL
*Non-conference game. ^{#}Rankings from AP Poll. (#) Tournament seedings in parentheses. MW=Midwest. All times are in Eastern Standard Time.

== Awards and honors ==
- Nate Blackwell – Atlantic 10 Player of the Year, First-team All-Atlantic 10
- John Chaney – USBWA National Coach of the Year, Atlantic 10 Coach of the Year
