= Clayton Public Schools =

School district in Bergen County, New Jersey, US

Address
- 350 East Clinton Street Clayton, Gloucester County, New Jersey, 08312; United States
- Coordinates: 39.651807°N 75.097592°W

District information
- Grades: K-12"
- Superintendent: Nikolaos Koutsogiannis
- Business administrator: Fran Adler
- Schools: 3

Students and staff
- Enrollment: 1,489 (as of 2024–25)
- Faculty: 124.0 FTEs
- Student–teacher ratio: 12.0:1

Other information
- District Factor Group: CD
- Website: www.claytonps.org
| Ind. | Per pupil | District spending | Rank (*) | K-12 average | %± vs. average |
|---|---|---|---|---|---|
| 1A | Total Spending | $16,951 | 15 | $18,891 | −10.3% |
| 1 | Budgetary Cost | 11,442 | 2 | 14,783 | −22.6% |
| 2 | Classroom Instruction | 6,816 | 5 | 8,763 | −22.2% |
| 6 | Support Services | 1,525 | 4 | 2,392 | −36.2% |
| 8 | Administrative Cost | 1,529 | 15 | 1,485 | 3.0% |
| 10 | Operations & Maintenance | 1,159 | 3 | 1,783 | −35.0% |
| 13 | Extracurricular Activities | 356 | 11 | 268 | 32.8% |
| 16 | Median Teacher Salary | 50,834 | 3 | 64,043 |
Data from NJDoE 2014 Taxpayers' Guide to Education Spending. *Of K-12 districts with up to 1,800 students. Lowest spending=1; Highest=49

Clayton Public Schools form a comprehensive community public school district that serves students in pre-kindergarten through twelfth grade from the borough of Clayton, in Gloucester County, in the U.S. state of New Jersey.

As of the 2024–25 school year, the district, comprised of three schools, had an enrollment of 1,489 students and 124.0 classroom teachers (on an FTE basis), for a student–teacher ratio of 12.0:1.

The district participates in the Interdistrict Public School Choice Program, which allows non-resident students to attend school in the district at no cost to their parents, with tuition covered by the resident district. Available slots are announced annually by grade.

Clayton Public Schools provides a variety of opportunities for students in academics, co-curricular activities, athletics, communications, technology, fine arts, and school-based student services. Through the Safe Schools/Healthy Students Grant Initiative, Clayton Schools offers counseling and assistance to students and families by providing an on-site counseling center at Herma Simmons Elementary School. The district also offers a School-Based Youth Services Program Clayton Place, which is housed in its high school/middle school, to provide counseling, tutoring, and recreation activities for students at the secondary level. In addition to a dedicated Home and School Association, Clayton School District has many partnerships with local organizations.

== History ==
In September 2009, voters approved a referendum for a $20 million renovation and expansion project at the middle school / high school. In September 2014, voters approved a referendum that covered $9.7 million to upgrade all three schools in the district. The approved projects include a roof replacement at both the high school and middle school, an addition of a 750-seat auditorium, technology infrastructure at all three schools, a new football field stadium lighting and a new gym floor at Herma Simmons Elementary School.

Clayton Public Schools had been classified by the New Jersey Department of Education as being in District Factor Group "CD", the sixth-highest of eight groupings. District Factor Groups organize districts statewide to allow comparison by common socioeconomic characteristics of the local districts. From lowest socioeconomic status to highest, the categories are A, B, CD, DE, FG, GH, I and J.

== Schools ==
Schools in the district (with 2024–25 enrollment data from the National Center for Education Statistics) are:

Elementary school

- Herma S. Simmons Elementary School with 715 students in grades PreK-5
  - Alicia Fragoso, principal

Middle school

- Clayton Middle School with 299 students in grades 6-8
  - Marvin Tucker, principal

High School

- Clayton High School with 431 students in grades 9-12
  - Matthew Slater, principal

== Administration ==
Core members of Clayton School District's administration are:

- Nikolaos Koutsogiannis, superintendent
- Fran Adler, business administrator and board secretary

== Board of education ==
The district's board of education is comprised of nine members who set policy and oversee the fiscal and educational operation of the district through its administration. As a Type II school district, the board's trustees are elected directly by voters to serve three-year terms of office on a staggered basis, with three seats up for election each year held (since 2012) as part of the November general election. The board appoints a superintendent to oversee the district's day-to-day operations and a business administrator to supervise the business functions of the district.
