= 2005–06 George Washington Colonials men's basketball team =

American college basketball season

2005–06 George Washington Colonials men's basketball

Atlantic 10 Regular Season Champions

NCAA tournament, second round
- Conference: Atlantic 10 Conference

Ranking
- Coaches: No. 19
- AP: No. 14
- Record: 27–3 (16–0 A-10)
- Head coach: Karl Hobbs (5th season)
- Home arena: Charles E. Smith Center

2005–06 Atlantic 10 men's basketball standings
| | Conf. | | | | Overall |
| Team | W | | L | PCT | W | | L | PCT |
|---|---|---|---|---|---|---|---|---|
| No. 14 George Washington | 16 | – | 0 | 1.000 | 27 | – | 3 | .900 |
| Charlotte | 11 | – | 5 | .688 | 19 | – | 13 | .594 |
| La Salle | 10 | – | 6 | .625 | 18 | – | 10 | .643 |
| Saint Louis | 10 | – | 6 | .625 | 16 | – | 13 | .552 |
| Saint Joseph's | 9 | – | 7 | .563 | 19 | – | 14 | .576 |
| Fordham | 9 | – | 7 | .563 | 16 | – | 16 | .500 |
| Xavier † | 8 | – | 8 | .500 | 21 | – | 11 | .656 |
| Temple | 8 | – | 8 | .500 | 17 | – | 15 | .531 |
| Rhode Island | 8 | – | 8 | .500 | 14 | – | 14 | .500 |
| UMass | 8 | – | 8 | .500 | 13 | – | 15 | .464 |
| Dayton | 6 | – | 10 | .375 | 14 | – | 17 | .452 |
| Richmond | 6 | – | 10 | .375 | 13 | – | 17 | .433 |
| St. Bonaventure | 2 | – | 14 | .125 | 8 | – | 19 | .296 |
| Duquesne | 1 | – | 15 | .063 | 3 | – | 24 | .111 |
† 2006 Atlantic 10 Tournament winner Rankings from AP Poll

The 2005–06 George Washington Colonials men's basketball team represented George Washington University in the 2005–06 NCAA Division I men's basketball season. The Colonials, led by head coach Karl Hobbs, played their home games at the Charles E. Smith Center in Washington, D.C., as members of the Atlantic 10 Conference.

The Colonials finished the regular season undefeated in conference play, registering a 26–1 overall record going into the postseason, but they were upset in the quarterfinals of the Atlantic 10 tournament. They earned an at-large bid to the NCAA tournament as the 8th seed in the Atlanta region. George Washington beat 9th-seeded UNC Wilmington to earn the program's first NCAA tournament win in 12 years. The team's season came to an end in the 2nd round, when they lost to top-seeded Duke, 74–61.

== Roster ==
2005–06 George Washington Colonials men's basketball team
Players
Coaches

| Pos. | # | Name | Height | Weight | Year | Hometown |
|---|---|---|---|---|---|---|
| F | 1 | Omar Williams | 6 ft 9 in (2.06 m) | — | Sr | Philadelphia, Pennsylvania |
| F | 2 | J. R. Pinnock | 6 ft 5 in (1.96 m) | — | Jr | McDonough, Georgia |
| F | 3 | Mike Hall | 6 ft 8 in (2.03 m) | — | Sr | Chicago, Illinois |
| F | 4 | Montrell McDonald | 6 ft 7 in (2.01 m) | — | Fr | Fort Worth, Texas |
| F | 5 | Rob Diggs | 6 ft 8 in (2.03 m) | — | Fr | Brandywine, Maryland |
| G | 12 | Dior Toney | — | — | Sr | Brecksville, Ohio |
| F | 13 | Alex Kireev | 6 ft 11 in (2.11 m) | — | Sr | Mykolaiv, Ukraine |
| F | 21 | Pops Mensah-Bonsu | 6 ft 9 in (2.06 m) | — | Sr | London, England |
| F | 23 | Régis Koundjia | 6 ft 8 in (2.03 m) | — | Jr | Bangui, Central African Republic |
| G | 25 | Carl Elliott | 6 ft 4 in (1.93 m) | — | Jr | Brooklyn, New York |
| G | 31 | Noel Wilmore | 6 ft 4 in (1.93 m) | — | Fr | Philadelphia, Pennsylvania |
| G | 33 | Maureece Rice | 6 ft 1 in (1.85 m) | — | So | Philadelphia, Pennsylvania |
| G | 34 | Keri Gonsalves | 6 ft 5 in (1.96 m) | — | So | Mitchellville, Maryland |
| F | 42 | Dokun Akingbade | 6 ft 9 in (2.06 m) | — | Sr | Riverdale, Maryland |
| F | 52 | Dominic Green | 6 ft 6 in (1.98 m) | — | So | Oakland, California |

Head coach

- Karl Hobbs (Connecticut)

Assistant coach(es)

Legend

- (C) Team captain
- (S) Suspended
- (I) Ineligible
- (W) Walk-on
- Injured
- Current redshirt

Roster
Last update: April 30, 2022

== Schedule and results ==
| Date time, TV | Rank^{#} | Opponent^{#} | Result | Record | Site (attendance) city, state |
Regular season
| November 23, 2005*; 7:30 pm | No. 21 | Kennesaw State | W 87–42 | 1–0 | Charles E. Smith Center (2,217); Washington, D.C. |
| November 26, 2005*; 2:00 pm | No. 21 | Norfolk State | W 80–69 | 2–0 | Charles E. Smith Center (2,292); Washington, D.C. |
| November 30, 2005*; 7:30 pm | No. 19 | Saint Francis (PA) | W 85–68 | 3–0 | Charles E. Smith Center (2,416); Washington, D.C. |
| December 2, 2005*; 7:30 pm | No. 19 | Boston University | W 75–62 | 4–0 | Charles E. Smith Center (4,009); Washington, D.C. |
| December 5, 2005*; 9:00 pm | No. 19 | vs. No. 23 Maryland; BB&T Classic | W 78–70 | 5–0 | MCI Center (11,712); Washington, D.C. |
| December 8, 2005*; 7:30 pm | No. 19 | Florida International | W 70–45 | 6–0 | Charles E. Smith Center (2,827); Washington, D.C. |
| December 10, 2005*; 7:00 pm | No. 19 | at Morgan State | W 102–75 | 7–0 | Talmadge L. Hill Field House (2,173); Baltimore, MD |
| December 17, 2005*; 2:00 pm | No. 15 | Maryland Eastern Shore | W 98–72 | 8–0 | Charles E. Smith Center (2,952); Washington, D.C. |
| December 30, 2005*; 7:00 pm | No. 12 | at No. 19 NC State | L 58–79 | 8–1 | RBC Center (16,132); Raleigh, NC |
| January 4, 2006; 6:00 pm | No. 20 | at Temple | W 72–60 | 9–1 (1–0) | Liacouras Center (3,646); Philadelphia, Pennsylvania |
| January 7, 2006*; 7:00 pm | No. 20 | at Marshall | W 79–73 ^{OT} | 10–1 | Cam Henderson Center (4,415); Huntington, WV |
| January 11, 2006; 8:00 pm | No. 17 | Saint Louis | W 69–64 ^{OT} | 11–1 (2–0) | Charles E. Smith Center (2,862); Washington, D.C. |
| January 14, 2006; 2:00 pm | No. 17 | Saint Joseph's | W 88–60 | 12–1 (3–0) | Charles E. Smith Center (4,356); Washington, D.C. |
| January 16, 2006* | No. 17 | Stony Brook | W 88–60 | 13–1 | Charles E. Smith Center (3,234); Washington, D.C. |
| January 21, 2006; 4:00 pm | No. 16 | at Charlotte | W 83–69 | 14–1 (4–0) | Dale F. Halton Arena (7,562); Charlotte, NC |
| January 25, 2006; 7:05 pm | No. 14 | at Duquesne | W 94–78 | 15–1 (5–0) | A. J. Palumbo Center (1,288); Pittsburgh, Pennsylvania |
| January 27, 2008; 2:00 pm | No. 14 | Rhode Island | W 81–62 | 16–1 (6–0) | Charles E. Smith Center (5,000); Washington, D.C. |
| February 2, 2006; 7:00 pm | No. 14 | at Xavier | W 89–85 | 17–1 (7–0) | Cintas Center (10,250); Cincinnati, OH |
| February 5, 2006; 12:00 pm | No. 10 | Richmond | W 80–55 | 18–1 (8–0) | Charles E. Smith Center (5,000); Washington, D.C. |
| February 8, 2006; 7:30 pm | No. 8 | Dayton | W 81–67 | 19–1 (9–0) | Charles E. Smith Center (5,000); Washington, D.C. |
| February 11, 2006; 2:00 pm | No. 8 | at Saint Joseph's | W 64–62 | 20–1 (10–0) | Alumni Memorial Fieldhouse (3,200); Philadelphia, PA |
| February 15, 2006; 7:30 pm | No. 7 | UMass | W 69–66 | 21–1 (11–0) | Charles E. Smith Center (5,000); Washington, D.C. |
| February 18, 2006; 7:00 pm | No. 7 | at Richmond | W 64–51 | 22–1 (12–0) | Robins Center (8,182); Richmond, VA |
| February 22, 2006; 7:30 pm | No. 6 | La Salle | W 77–65 | 23–1 (13–0) | Charles E. Smith Center (5,000); Washington, D.C. |
| February 25, 2006; 4:00 pm | No. 6 | at Fordham | W 78–67 | 24–1 (14–0) | Rose Hill Gymnasium (3,200); Bronx, NY |
| March 1, 2006; 7:00 pm | No. 7 | at St. Bonaventure | W 89–78 | 25–1 (15–0) | Reilly Center (4,801); Olean, NY |
| March 4, 2006; 2:00 pm | No. 7 | Charlotte | W 86–85 ^{OT} | 26–1 (16–0) | Charles E. Smith Center (5,000); Washington, D.C. |
Atlantic 10 tournament
| March 9, 2006; 12:00 pm | (1) No. 6 | vs. (9) Temple; Atlantic 10 Quarterfinals | L 53–68 | 26–2 | U.S. Bank Arena (4,407); Cincinnati, OH |
NCAA tournament
| March 16, 2006; 7:10 pm | (8 A) No. 14 | vs. (9 A) UNC Wilmington; NCAA First Round | W 88–85 ^{OT} | 27–2 | Greensboro Coliseum (22,642); Greensboro, NC |
| March 18, 2006; 1:10 pm | (8 A) No. 14 | vs. (1 A) No. 1 Duke; NCAA Second Round | L 61–74 | 27–3 | Greensboro Coliseum (22,809); Greensboro, NC |
*Non-conference game. ^{#}Rankings from AP Poll. (#) Tournament seedings in parentheses. All times are in Eastern Time.

== Rankings ==
Ranking movements Legend: ██ Increase in ranking ██ Decrease in ranking
| | Week | | | | | | | | | | | | | | | | | | | |
| Poll | Pre | 1 | 2 | 3 | 4 | 5 | 6 | 7 | 8 | 9 | 10 | 11 | 12 | 13 | 14 | 15 | 16 | 17 | 18 | Final |
|---|---|---|---|---|---|---|---|---|---|---|---|---|---|---|---|---|---|---|---|---|
| AP | 21 | 21 | 21 | 19 | 19 | 15 | 13 | 12 | 20 | 17 | 16 | 14 | 10 | 8 | 7 | 6 | 7 | 6 | 14 | Not released |
| Coaches | 24 | | 22 | 22 | 20 | 15 | 13 | 12 | 19 | 19 | 18 | 15 | 10 | 8 | 8 | 6 | 6 | 6 | 11 | 19 |
