= 1986–87 West Virginia Mountaineers men's basketball team =

American college basketball season

1986–87 West Virginia Mountaineers men's basketball

NCAA tournament
- Conference: Atlantic-10 Conference
- Record: 23–8 (15–3 A-10)
- Head coach: Gale Catlett (9th season)
- Home arena: WVU Coliseum

1986–87 Atlantic 10 men's basketball standings
	Conf.				Overall
Team	W		L	PCT	W		L	PCT
No. 8 Temple †	17	–	1	.944	32	–	4	.889
West Virginia	15	–	3	.833	23	–	8	.742
Rhode Island	12	–	6	.667	20	–	10	.667
Penn State	9	–	9	.500	15	–	12	.556
Saint Joseph's	9	–	9	.500	16	–	13	.552
Duquesne	7	–	11	.389	12	–	17	.414
UMass	7	–	11	.389	11	–	16	.407
George Washington	6	–	12	.333	10	–	19	.345
Rutgers	5	–	13	.278	8	–	20	.286
St. Bonaventure	3	–	15	.167	5	–	23	.179
† 1987 Atlantic 10 Tournament winner Rankings from AP Poll

The 1986–87 West Virginia Mountaineers men's basketball team represented West Virginia University as a member of the Atlantic-10 Conference during the 1986-87 season. The team played their home games at WVU Coliseum in Morgantown, West Virginia. Led by 9th-year head coach Gale Catlett, the Mountaineers finished second in the conference regular season standings, and received an at-large bid to the 1987 NCAA Tournament as No. 7 seed in the East region.

== Roster ==
1986–87 West Virginia Mountaineers men's basketball team
Players
Coaches

Pos.	#	Name	Height	Weight	Year	Hometown
G	4	Steve Berger	5 ft 11 in (1.8 m)	170 lb (77 kg)	Sr	Boomer, West Virginia
F	24	Darryl Prue	6 ft 7 in (2.01 m)	225 lb (102 kg)	So	Washington, D.C.
G	32	Herbie Brooks	6 ft 2 in (1.88 m)	180 lb (82 kg)	So	Mullens, West Virginia
F/C	33	Wade Smith	6 ft 10 in (2.08 m)	210 lb (95 kg)	So	Saint John, U.S. Virgin Islands
C	42	Ray Foster	6 ft 10 in (2.08 m)	240 lb (109 kg)	So	Cleveland, Ohio

Head coach

- Gale Catlett

Assistant coach(es)

Legend

- (C) Team captain
- (S) Suspended
- (I) Ineligible
- (W) Walk-on
- Injured
- Current redshirt

== Schedule and results ==
Date time, TV	Rank^{#}	Opponent^{#}	Result	Record	Site city, state
Regular Season
Nov 29, 1986*		George Mason	W 90–74	1–0	WVU Coliseum; Morgantown, West Virginia
Dec 13, 1986*		at No. 17 Pittsburgh	L 57–78	5–1	Fitzgerald Field House; Pittsburgh, Pennsylvania
Dec 27, 1986*		Marshall; Rivalry	W 69–67	7–1	WVU Coliseum; Morgantown, West Virginia
Feb 3, 1987*		UAB	W 79–64	15–5	WVU Coliseum; Morgantown, West Virginia
Atlantic-10 Tournament
Mar 1, 1987*		Duquesne; Quarterfinals	W 74–60	22–6	WVU Coliseum; Morgantown, West Virginia
Mar 3, 1987*		Rhode Island; Semifinals	W 80–58	23–6	WVU Coliseum; Morgantown, West Virginia
Mar 5, 1987*		at No. 8 Temple; Championship game	L 57–70	23–7	McGonigle Hall; Philadelphia, Pennsylvania
NCAA Tournament
Mar 13, 1987*	(7 E)	vs. (10 E) Western Kentucky; First round	L 62–64	23–8	Carrier Dome; Syracuse, New York
*Non-conference game. ^{#}Rankings from AP Poll. (#) Tournament seedings in parentheses. E=East. All times are in Eastern.
