= 2006 Atlantic 10 men's basketball tournament =

- Classification: Division I
- Season: 2005–06
- Teams: 12
- Site: U.S. Bank Arena; Cincinnati, Ohio
- Champions: Xavier (4th title)
- Winning coach: Sean Miller (1st title)
- MVP: Justin Cage (Xavier)

2005–06 Atlantic 10 men's basketball standings
	Conf.				Overall
Team	W		L	PCT	W		L	PCT
No. 14 George Washington	16	–	0	1.000	27	–	3	.900
Charlotte	11	–	5	.688	19	–	13	.594
La Salle	10	–	6	.625	18	–	10	.643
Saint Louis	10	–	6	.625	16	–	13	.552
Saint Joseph's	9	–	7	.563	19	–	14	.576
Fordham	9	–	7	.563	16	–	16	.500
Xavier †	8	–	8	.500	21	–	11	.656
Temple	8	–	8	.500	17	–	15	.531
Rhode Island	8	–	8	.500	14	–	14	.500
UMass	8	–	8	.500	13	–	15	.464
Dayton	6	–	10	.375	14	–	17	.452
Richmond	6	–	10	.375	13	–	17	.433
St. Bonaventure	2	–	14	.125	8	–	19	.296
Duquesne	1	–	15	.063	3	–	24	.111
† 2006 Atlantic 10 Tournament winner Rankings from AP Poll

The 2006 Atlantic 10 men's basketball tournament was played from March 8 to March 11, 2006, at U.S. Bank Arena in Cincinnati, Ohio. The winner was named champion of the Atlantic 10 Conference and received an automatic bid to the 2006 NCAA Men's Division I Basketball Tournament.

Xavier won the tournament. The top four teams in the conference received first-round byes, while Duquesne and St. Bonaventure were left out of the tournament as the bottom two teams in the conference standings. George Washington entered the tournament undefeated in Atlantic 10 play, but lost to Temple in the quarterfinals. George Washington earned an at-large bid to the NCAA tournament.

== Bracket ==
First round Wednesday, March 8
8	Rhode Island	45
9	Temple	74
5	Saint Joseph's	67
12	Dayton	55
7	UMass	66
10	Xavier	75
6	Fordham	45
11	Richmond	37

Quarterfinals; Thursday, March 9
1	#6 George Washington	53
9	Temple	68
4	Saint Louis	37
5	Saint Joseph's	56
2	Charlotte	55
10	Xavier	59
3	La Salle	62
6	Fordham	64

Semifinals; Friday, March 10
9	Temple	59
5	Saint Joseph's	73
10	Xavier	70
6	Fordham	59

Final; Saturday, March 11
5	Saint Joseph's	61
10	Xavier	62

All games played at U.S. Bank Arena in Cincinnati.
