= 1986–87 Western Kentucky Hilltoppers basketball team =

American college basketball season

1986–87 Western Kentucky Hilltoppers basketball

Sun Belt Conference Champion Wendy's Classic Champion Chaminade Classic Champion

NCAA Tournament, Second Round
- Conference: Sun Belt Conference
- Record: 29–9 (12–2 Sun Belt)
- Head coach: Murray Arnold
- Assistant coach: Robbie Laing (1st season)
- Home arena: E. A. Diddle Arena

1986–87 Sun Belt Conference men's basketball standings
| | Conf. | | | | Overall |
| Team | W | | L | PCT | W | | L | PCT |
|---|---|---|---|---|---|---|---|---|
| Western Kentucky | 12 | – | 2 | .857 | 29 | – | 9 | .763 |
| Jacksonville | 11 | – | 3 | .786 | 19 | – | 11 | .633 |
| UAB † | 10 | – | 4 | .714 | 21 | – | 11 | .656 |
| Virginia Commonwealth | 7 | – | 7 | .500 | 17 | – | 14 | .548 |
| UNC Charlotte | 6 | – | 8 | .429 | 18 | – | 14 | .563 |
| South Alabama | 6 | – | 8 | .429 | 14 | – | 14 | .500 |
| South Florida | 3 | – | 11 | .214 | 8 | – | 20 | .286 |
| Old Dominion | 1 | – | 13 | .071 | 6 | – | 22 | .214 |
† 1987 Sun Belt Conference tournament winner Rankings from AP Poll

The 1986–87 Western Kentucky Hilltoppers men's basketball team represented Western Kentucky University during the 1986–87 NCAA Division I men's basketball season. The Hilltoppers were led by Sun Belt Conference Coach of the Year Murray Arnold and SBC Player of the Year Tellis Frank. The Hilltoppers started the season by advancing to the finals of the Preseason NIT and then being ranked in the top 10 of both major polls. WKU won the SBC championship and received a bid to the 1987 NCAA Division I men's basketball tournament. This team was one of the most talented in school history with three players being drafted in the early rounds of the NBA draft: Frank in the 1st round, Kannard Johnson in the 2nd, and Clarence Martin in the 3rd. Frank and Johnson were selected to the All-Conference Team; Frank and Brett McNeal made the SBC All-Tournament Team.

== Schedule ==
| Date time, TV | Rank^{#} | Opponent^{#} | Result | Record | Site city, state |
Regular Season
| 11/21/1986* | | at Notre Dame; Preseason NIT | W 80–63 | 1–0 | Edmund P. Joyce Center; South Bend, IN |
| 11/24/1986* | | Texas Christian; Preseason NIT | W 96–90 | 2–0 | E. A. Diddle Arena; Bowling Green, KY |
| 11/28/1986* | | vs. Memphis State; Preseason NIT Semifinals | W 68–67 | 3–0 | Madison Square Garden; New York, NY |
| 11/29/1986* | | vs. No. 5 UNLV; Preseason NIT Finals | L 95–96 ^{2OT} | 3–1 | Madison Square Garden; New York, NY |
| 12/2/1986* | No. 14 | Kentucky State | W 90–58 | 4–1 | E. A. Diddle Arena; Bowling Green, KY |
| 12/5/1986* | No. 14 | Mercer; Wendy’s Classic | W 98–67 | 5–1 | E. A. Diddle Arena; Bowling Green, KY |
| 12/6/1986* | No. 14 | USC; Wendy’s Classic | W 82–52 | 6–1 | E. A. Diddle Arena; Bowling Green, KY |
| 12/10/1986* | No. 8 | Louisville | L 58–60 | 6–2 | E. A. Diddle Arena; Bowling Green, KY |
| 12/11/1986* | No. 8 | Central Michigan | L 65–73 | 6–3 | E. A. Diddle Arena; Bowling Green, KY |
| 12/13/1986* | No. 8 | at Samford | W 94–57 | 7–3 | Seibert Hall; Homewood, AL |
| 12/19/1986* | | Armstrong State | W 68–48 | 8–3 | E. A. Diddle Arena; Bowling Green, KY |
| 12/25/1986* | | vs. Hawaii Pacific; Chaminade Classic | W 89–74 | 9–3 | Neal S. Blaisdell Center; Honolulu, HI |
| 12/26/1986* | | at Chaminade; Chaminade Classic | W 71–70 | 10–3 | Neal S. Blaisdell Center; Honolulu, HI |
| 12/30/1986* | | Tennessee Tech | W 102–46 | 11–3 | E. A. Diddle Arena; Bowling Green, KY |
| 1/3/1987* | | at Butler | W 74–73 ^{OT} | 12–3 | Hinkle Fieldhouse; Indianapolis, IN |
| 1/7/1987* | | at Eastern Kentucky | L 66–68 | 12–4 | Alumni Coliseum; Richmond, KY |
| 1/10/1987 | | UAB | W 85–67 | 13–4 (1-0) | E. A. Diddle Arena; Bowling Green, KY |
| 1/12/1987 | | at VCU | W 79–70 | 14–4 (2-0) | Richmond Coliseum; Richmond, VA |
| 1/14/1987 | | at Jacksonville | L 71–80 | 14–5 (2-1) | Swisher Gymnasium; Jacksonville, FL |
| 1/17/1987 | | VCU | W 90–71 | 15–5 (3-1) | E. A. Diddle Arena; Bowling Green, KY |
| 1/19/1987 | | at South Florida | W 61–46 | 16–5 (4-1) | USF Sun Dome; Tampa, FL |
| 1/24/1987* | | at LSU | L 62–67 | 16–6 | LSU Assembly Center; Baton Rouge, LA |
| 1/26/1987 | | at South Alabama | W 68–60 | 17–6 (5-1) | Jaguar Gym; Mobile, AL |
| 1/29/1987 | | South Florida | W 76–59 | 18–6 (6-1) | E. A. Diddle Arena; Bowling Green, KY |
| 1/31/1987 | | UNCC | W 88–69 | 19–6 (7-1) | E. A. Diddle Arena; Bowling Green, KY |
| 2/3/1987 | | ODU | W 94–53 | 20–6 (8-1) | E. A. Diddle Arena; Bowling Green, KY |
| 2/8/1987 | | at UNCC | W 74–71 ^{OT} | 21–6 (9-1) | Belk Gymnasium; Charlotte, NC |
| 2/12/1987 | | at ODU | W 75–59 | 22–6 (10-1) | Norfolk Scope; Norfolk, VA |
| 2/14/1987 | | South Alabama | W 85–70 | 23–6 (11-1) | E. A. Diddle Arena; Bowling Green, KY |
| 2/16/1987 | | Jacksonville | W 87–74 | 24–6 (12-1) | E. A. Diddle Arena; Bowling Green, KY |
| 2/18/1987* | | at Southern Illinois | W 78–58 | 25–6 | Banterra Center; Carbondale, IL |
| 2/21/1987 | | at UAB | L 73–86 | 25–7 (12-2) | Birmingham–Jefferson Convention Complex; Birmingham, AL |
1987 Sun Belt Conference men's basketball tournament
| 2/26/1987 | (1) | (8) ODU; Quarterfinals | W 60–58 | 26–7 | E. A. Diddle Arena; Bowling Green, KY |
| 2/27/1987 | (1) | (5) UNCC; Semifinals | W 99–95 ^{2OT} | 27–7 | E. A. Diddle Arena; Bowling Green, KY |
| 2/28/1987 | (1) | vs. (3) UAB; Finals | L 70–72 | 27–8 | E. A. Diddle Arena; Bowling Green, KY |
Regular Season
| 3/3/1987* | | at Dayton | W 78–72 | 28–8 | UD Arena; Dayton, OH |
1987 NCAA Division I men's basketball tournament
| 3/13/1987* | (10 E) | vs. (7 E) West Virginia; First Round | W 64–62 | 29–8 | Carrier Dome; Syracuse, NY |
| 3/15/1987* | (10 E) | at (2 E) No. 10 Syracuse; Second Round | L 86–104 | 29–9 | Carrier Dome; Syracuse, NY |
*Non-conference game. ^{#}Rankings from AP Poll (E#) during NCAA Tournament is seed. (#) Tournament seedings in parentheses.
