= Reggie Turner (basketball) =

American former basketball player

Personal information
- Born: May 3, 1966 (age 60) Birmingham, Alabama, U.S.
- Listed height: 6 ft 7 in (2.01 m)
- Listed weight: 225 lb (102 kg)

Career information
- High school: Shades Valley (Irondale, Alabama)
- College: UAB (1985–1989)
- NBA draft: 1989: 2nd round, 47th overall pick
- Drafted by: Denver Nuggets
- Playing career: 1989–1990
- Position: Small forward

Career history
- 1989–1990: Omaha Racers
- Stats at Basketball Reference

Reginald Bernard Turner (born May 3, 1966) is an American former professional basketball player. He played college basketball for the UAB Blazers.

Born in Birmingham, Alabama, Turner attended Shades Valley High School in Irondale, Alabama. He averaged 17.5 points and 10.0 rebounds per game and was a two-time all-state selection. Turner chose to play for the Blazers in May 1984 but did not meet the grade point average required by the National Collegiate Athletic Association (NCAA) to receive an athletic scholarship and was subsequently ineligible for the 1984–85 season. He still enrolled at the University of Alabama at Birmingham (UAB) to preserve his four years of NCAA Division I collegiate eligibility. Turner played for the Blazers from 1985 to 1989.

Turner was drafted by the Denver Nuggets as the 47th overall pick in the 1989 NBA draft. After spending rookie camp with Denver, he was traded to the Utah Jazz for future considerations. Turner was waived by Utah as one of their final preseason cuts on October 22, 1989. He played for the Omaha Racers of the Continental Basketball Association (CBA) during the 1989–90 season. Turner attended summer camp tryouts with the Boston Celtics prior to the 1990–91 NBA season.

== Career statistics ==
Legend
| GP | Games played | GS | Games started | MPG | Minutes per game |
| FG% | Field goal percentage | 3P% | 3-point field goal percentage | FT% | Free throw percentage |
| RPG | Rebounds per game | APG | Assists per game | SPG | Steals per game |
| BPG | Blocks per game | PPG | Points per game | **Bold** | Career high |

=== College ===
| Year | Team | GP | GS | MPG | FG% | 3P% | FT% | RPG | APG | SPG | BPG | PPG |
|---|---|---|---|---|---|---|---|---|---|---|---|---|
| 1985–86 | UAB | 18 | 1 | 4.7 | .481 | – | .444 | 1.4 | .1 | .3 | .2 | 1.9 |
| 1986–87 | UAB | 31 | 8 | 16.3 | **.538** | **.500** | .712 | 3.5 | .5 | .4 | .4 | 4.2 |
| 1987–88 | UAB | 31 | **25** | 29.1 | .457 | .479 | .778 | 5.6 | 1.0 | **1.4** | .6 | 11.3 |
| 1988–89 | UAB | **34** | – | **33.4** | .507 | .333 | **.868** | **7.4** | **1.2** | 1.1 | **.7** | **19.5** |
| Career | | 114 | 34 | 23.1 | .493 | .406 | .788 | 4.9 | .8 | .8 | .5 | 10.3 |
