= 1987 Sun Belt Conference men's basketball tournament =

- Classification: Division I
- Season: 1986–87
- Teams: 8
- Site: E.A. Diddle Arena; Bowling Green, KY
- Champions: UAB (4th title)
- Winning coach: Gene Bartow (4th title)
- MVP: Tracy Foster (UAB)

1986–87 Sun Belt Conference men's basketball standings
	Conf.				Overall
Team	W		L	PCT	W		L	PCT
Western Kentucky	12	–	2	.857	29	–	9	.763
Jacksonville	11	–	3	.786	19	–	11	.633
UAB †	10	–	4	.714	21	–	11	.656
Virginia Commonwealth	7	–	7	.500	17	–	14	.548
UNC Charlotte	6	–	8	.429	18	–	14	.563
South Alabama	6	–	8	.429	14	–	14	.500
South Florida	3	–	11	.214	8	–	20	.286
Old Dominion	1	–	13	.071	6	–	22	.214
† 1987 Sun Belt Conference tournament winner Rankings from AP Poll

The 1987 Sun Belt Conference men's basketball tournament was held February 26–28 at E.A. Diddle Arena at Western Kentucky University in Bowling Green, Kentucky.

UAB upset hosts Western Kentucky in the championship game, 72–70, to win their fourth Sun Belt men's basketball tournament.

The Blazers, in turn, received an automatic bid to the 1987 NCAA tournament. They were joined in the tournament by fellow Sun Belt member Western Kentucky, who received an at-large bid.

== Format ==
There were no changes to the existing tournament format. All eight conference members were placed into the initial quarterfinal round and each team was seeded based on its regular season conference record.

== Bracket ==
Quarterfinals; Thursday, February 26
1	Western Kentucky	60
8	Old Dominion	58
5	UNC Charlotte	88
4	VCU	73
3	UAB	77
6	South Alabama	64
7	South Florida	63
2	Jacksonville	68

Semifinals; Friday, February 27
1	Western Kentucky	99
5	UNC Charlotte	95
3	UAB	93
2	Jacksonville	86

Championship; Saturday, February 28
1	Western Kentucky	70
3	UAB	72

== See also ==
- Sun Belt Conference women's basketball tournament
