= 2005–06 UMass Minutemen basketball team =

American college basketball season

2005–06 UMass Minutemen men's basketball
- Conference: Atlantic 10 Conference
- Record: 13-15 (8-8 A-10)
- Head coach: Travis Ford (1st season)
- Assistant coaches: Tim Maloney; Steve Middleton; Adam Ginsburg
- Home arena: William D. Mullins Memorial Center

2005–06 Atlantic 10 men's basketball standings
	Conf.				Overall
Team	W		L	PCT	W		L	PCT
No. 14 George Washington	16	–	0	1.000	27	–	3	.900
Charlotte	11	–	5	.688	19	–	13	.594
La Salle	10	–	6	.625	18	–	10	.643
Saint Louis	10	–	6	.625	16	–	13	.552
Saint Joseph's	9	–	7	.563	19	–	14	.576
Fordham	9	–	7	.563	16	–	16	.500
Xavier †	8	–	8	.500	21	–	11	.656
Temple	8	–	8	.500	17	–	15	.531
Rhode Island	8	–	8	.500	14	–	14	.500
UMass	8	–	8	.500	13	–	15	.464
Dayton	6	–	10	.375	14	–	17	.452
Richmond	6	–	10	.375	13	–	17	.433
St. Bonaventure	2	–	14	.125	8	–	19	.296
Duquesne	1	–	15	.063	3	–	24	.111
† 2006 Atlantic 10 Tournament winner Rankings from AP Poll

The 2005-06 UMass Minutemen basketball team represented the University of Massachusetts Amherst during the 2005–06 NCAA Division I men's basketball season. The Minutemen, led by first year head coach Travis Ford, played their home games at William D. Mullins Memorial Center and were members of the Atlantic 10 Conference. They finished the season 13–15, 8–8 in A-10 play to finish in a four-way tie for seventh place.

== Roster ==
Number	Name	Position	Height	Weight	Year	Hometown
1	Rashaun Freeman	Center/Forward	6–9	255	Junior	Schenectady, New York
2	Brandon Thomas	Guard/Forward	6–6	200	Junior	San Antonio, Texas
10	Drew Rossi	Guard	6–1	170	Junior	Springfield, Massachusetts
12	Matt Pennie	Forward	6–7	210	Junior	Hanson, Massachusetts
13	Stéphane Lasme	Forward	6–8	190	Junior	Libreville, Gabon
14	Chris Lowe	Guard	6–0	160	Freshman	Mount Vernon, New York
20	Dante Milligan	Forward	6–9	215	RS Sophomore	New York City
21	Etienne Brower	Forward	6–7	200	Junior	West Hempstead, New York
22	Jeff Viggiano	Forward	6–6	215	Senior	Suffield, Connecticut
23	Lawrence Carrier	Forward	6–8	225	Sophomore	San Bernardino, California
31	Luke Bonner	Center	7-0	245	Sophomore	Concord, New Hampshire
34	James Life	Guard	6–6	190	Junior	Fort Myers, Florida
40	Nana Ampim	Guard	6–1	195	Sophomore	London
45	Gary Forbes	Forward/Guard	6–7	220	Junior	Brooklyn, New York

== Schedule ==
Date time, TV	Rank^{#}	Opponent^{#}	Result	Record	Site (attendance) city, state
Exhibition
11/10/2005*; 7:00 pm		Dowling	W 96–55		Mullins Center; Amherst, MA
Regular Season
11/18/2005*; 7:00 pm		Hartford	W 67–62	1–0	Mullins Center (6,488); Amherst, MA
11/22/2005*; 7:00 pm		at Davidson	L 63–66	1–1	Belk Arena (3,084); Davidson, NC
11/25/2005*; 1:00 pm, FoxSportsNet		vs. UAB; Basketball Hall of Fame Tip-Off Classic	L 77–86	1–2	MassMutual Center (6,105); Springfield, MA
11/28/2005*; 7:00 pm		Savannah State	W 93–57	2–2	Mullins Center; Amherst, MA
12/08/2005*; 9:00 pm, ESPN2		at No. 3 UConn	L 60–78	2–3	Hartford Civic Center (16,294); Hartford, CT
12/12/2005*; 7:00 pm		Boston University	W 64–45	3–3	Mullins Center; Amherst, MA
12/23/2005*; 7:00 pm		Siena	W 78–69	4–3	Mullins Center; Amherst, MA
12/27/2005*; 6:30 pm		vs. Saint Peter's; Panasonic Holiday Festival Semifinal	W 66–49	5–3	Madison Square Garden; New York, NY
12/28/2005*; 8:45 pm, MSG		vs. St. John's; Panasonic Holiday Festival Final	L 49–51	5–4	Madison Square Garden (7,408); New York, NY
01/03/2006*; 7:00 pm		at No. 11 Boston College	L 62-91	5-5	Conte Forum; Chestnut Hill, MA
01/07/2006; 2:00 pm		at Duquesne	W 82-63	6-5 (1-0)	Palumbo Center; Pittsburgh, PA
01/11/2006; 8:00 pm		Saint Joseph's	W 68-58	7-5 (2-0)	Mullins Center; Amherst, MA
01/14/2006; 8:00 pm		at Saint Louis	L 48-50	7-6 (2-1)	Family Arena; St. Charles, MO
01/18/2006; 7:00 pm		Fordham	W 74-61	8-6 (3-1)	Mullins Center; Amherst, MA
01/21/2006; 2:00 pm		Temple	W 60-34	9-6 (4-1)	Mullins Center; Amherst, MA
01/25/2006; 7:30 pm		at Rhode Island	L 55-58	9-7 (4-2)	Ryan Center; Kingston, RI
01/29/2006; 2:00 pm		at La Salle	L 61-68	9-8 (4-3)	Tom Gola Arena; Philadelphia, PA
02/01/2006; 7:00 pm		at Temple	L 47-76	9-9 (4-4)	Liacouras Center; Philadelphia, PA
02/04/2006; 7:00 pm		Rhode Island	W 63-61	10-9 (5-4)	Mullins Center; Amherst, MA
02/08/2006; 7:00 pm		La Salle	L 44-65	10-10 (5-5)	Mullins Center; Amherst, MA
02/12/2006*; 5:30 pm		at Florida State	L 63-73	10-11 (5-5)	Tallahassee-Leon County Civic Center; Tallahassee, FL
02/15/2006; 7:30 pm		at No. 7 George Washington	L 66-69	10-12 (5-6)	Charles E. Smith Center (5,000); Washington, D.C.
02/19/2006; 2:00 pm		at St. Bonaventure	W 72-64	11-12 (6-6)	Reilly Center; St. Bonaventure, NY
2/22/2006; 7:00 pm		Charlotte	L 71-72	11-13 (6-7)	Mullins Center; Amherst, MA
02/25/2006; 12:00 pm, WHIO-TV		Dayton	W 66-47	12-13 (7-7)	Mullins Center (5,508); Amherst, MA
03/01/2006; 7:30 pm		at Richmond	L 66-81	12-14 (7-8)	Robins Center; Richmond, VA
03/04/2006; 4:00 pm		Xavier	W 65-56	13-14 (8-8)	Mullins Center; Amherst, Massachusetts
2006 Atlantic 10 men's basketball tournament
03/08/2006; 6:30 pm	(7)	vs. (10) Xavier; First Round	L 66-75	13-15 (8-8)	U.S. Bank Arena; Cincinnati, OH
*Non-conference game. ^{#}Rankings from AP Poll. (#) Tournament seedings in parentheses. All times are in Eastern Time.
