= 2005–06 Dayton Flyers men's basketball team =

American college basketball season

2005–06 Dayton Flyers men's basketball
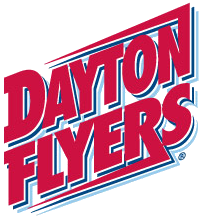
- Conference: Atlantic 10 Conference
- Record: 14–17 (6–10 A-10)
- Head coach: Brian Gregory (3rd season)
- Assistant coaches: Billy Schmidt; Reggie Rankin; Bob Beyer
- Home arena: University of Dayton Arena

2005–06 Atlantic 10 men's basketball standings
	Conf.				Overall
Team	W		L	PCT	W		L	PCT
No. 14 George Washington	16	–	0	1.000	27	–	3	.900
Charlotte	11	–	5	.688	19	–	13	.594
La Salle	10	–	6	.625	18	–	10	.643
Saint Louis	10	–	6	.625	16	–	13	.552
Saint Joseph's	9	–	7	.563	19	–	14	.576
Fordham	9	–	7	.563	16	–	16	.500
Xavier †	8	–	8	.500	21	–	11	.656
Temple	8	–	8	.500	17	–	15	.531
Rhode Island	8	–	8	.500	14	–	14	.500
UMass	8	–	8	.500	13	–	15	.464
Dayton	6	–	10	.375	14	–	17	.452
Richmond	6	–	10	.375	13	–	17	.433
St. Bonaventure	2	–	14	.125	8	–	19	.296
Duquesne	1	–	15	.063	3	–	24	.111
† 2006 Atlantic 10 Tournament winner Rankings from AP Poll

The 2005–06 Dayton Flyers men's basketball team represented the University of Dayton during the 2005–06 NCAA Division I men's basketball season. The Flyers, led by third year head coach Brian Gregory, played their home games at the University of Dayton Arena and were members of the Atlantic 10 Conference. They finished the season 14–17, 6–10 in A-10 play, their first losing season since 1998-99 and currently the last time the program finished with a losing record. The Flyers started the season 8-3, including a win at Cincinnati, the program's first win on their rivals home court since 1984, before losing 7 games in a row. The Flyers lost to Saint Joseph's in the first round of the Atlantic 10 tournament. Dayton was not selected to play in a postseason tournament, the 2nd season in a row that the Flyers did not play in a postseason tournament.

== Previous season ==
The 2004–05 Dayton Flyers finished the season 18–11, with a record of 10-6 in the Atlantic 10 regular season. The Flyers season ended in the quarterfinals of the 2005 Atlantic 10 men's basketball tournament against Temple.

== Incoming recruits ==
College recruiting information
Name	Hometown	School	Height	Weight	Commit date
Charles Little; F	Cleveland, TN	Cleveland	6 ft 6 in (1.98 m)	210 lb (95 kg)	
Charles Little; F	Recruit ratings: Scout: Rivals: (N/A)				
Desmond Adedeji; C	Hyattsville, MD	Dematha	6 ft 9 in (2.06 m)	260 lb (120 kg)	
Desmond Adedeji; C	Recruit ratings: Scout: Rivals: (N/A)				
Overall recruit ranking:
Note: In many cases, Scout, Rivals, 247Sports, On3, and ESPN may conflict in their listings of height and weight.; In these cases, the average was taken. ESPN grades are on a 100-point scale.; Sources: "2005 Team Ranking". Rivals.

== Roster ==
2005–06 Dayton Flyers men's basketball team
Players
Coaches

Pos.	#	Name	Height	Weight	Year	Previous school	Hometown
F	1	Monty Scott	6 ft 6 in (1.98 m)	220 lb (100 kg)	Jr	Reynoldsburg	Reynoldsburg, OH
G	2	Brian Roberts	6 ft 2 in (1.88 m)	180 lb (82 kg)	So	St. John's	Toledo, OH
F	3	Charles Little	6 ft 6 in (1.98 m)	220 lb (100 kg)	Fr	Cleveland	Cleveland, TN
G	4	Jeff Penno (W)	6 ft 5 in (1.96 m)	195 lb (88 kg)	Sr	Alter	Kettering, OH
F/C	5	Nick Stafford	6 ft 7 in (2.01 m)	220 lb (100 kg)	RS So	Worcester	Springfield, MA
G	11	Warren Williams	6 ft 0 in (1.83 m)	190 lb (86 kg)	Sr	DeMatha	Gaithersburg, MD
G/F	15	Logan White	6 ft 4 in (1.93 m)	190 lb (86 kg)	Sr	University	Cleveland, OH
F	20	Desmond Adedeji	6 ft 9 in (2.06 m)	270 lb (122 kg)	Fr	DeMatha	Landover Hills, MD
F	21	Norman Plummer	6 ft 7 in (2.01 m)	225 lb (102 kg)	So	Hargrave Military	Cincinnati, OH
G	24	Marques Bennett	6 ft 4 in (1.93 m)	200 lb (91 kg)	Sr	Brebuf Jesuit	Indianapolis, IN
F	32	Chris Alvarez	6 ft 8 in (2.03 m)	225 lb (102 kg)	So	Blair	Miami, FL
F	33	Jimmy Binnie	6 ft 6 in (1.98 m)	215 lb (98 kg)	So	Johnston	Des Moines, IA
G	34	Monroe Douglass (W)	6 ft 0 in (1.83 m)	180 lb (82 kg)	So	Chaminade	St. Louis, MO
C	44	James Cripe	6 ft 11 in (2.11 m)	255 lb (116 kg)	Jr	Loveland	Loveland, OH
G	54	William Brady (W)	6 ft 3 in (1.91 m)	205 lb (93 kg)	So	Central Catholic	Bloomington, IL

Head coach

- Brian Gregory (Oakland)

Assistant coach(es)

- Billy Schmidt (Wake Forest)
- Reggie Rankin (Ohio)
- Bob Beyer (Alfred)

Legend

- (C) Team captain
- (S) Suspended
- (I) Ineligible
- (W) Walk-on
- Injured
- Current redshirt

Roster

== Schedule ==
Date time, TV	Rank^{#}	Opponent^{#}	Result	Record	Site (attendance) city, state
Exhibition
11/05/2005*		Central State	W 78-54	–	UD Arena; Dayton, OH
11/12/2005*		Findlay	W 86-61	–	UD Arena; Dayton, OH
Non-conference regular season
11/18/2005*; 8:00 pm		Tennessee Tech	W 81–60	1–0	UD Arena (13,040); Dayton, OH
11/21/2005*; 6:30 pm, WHIO-TV		at Miami (OH)	L 42-58	1-1	Millett Hall (6,038); Oxford, OH
11/23/2005*; 7:00 pm, TWTV		Morehead State	W 67-41	2–1	UD Arena (12,346); Dayton, OH
11/26/2005*; 7:05 pm		at Creighton	L 90-91 ^{2ot}	2-2	Qwest Center Omaha (12,028); Omaha, NE
11/29/2005*; 8:00 pm, WHIO-TV		at Cincinnati	W 75–66	3–2	Fifth Third Arena (9,199); Cincinnati, OH
12/01/2005*; 7:00 pm		Pepperdine	W 63-45	4-2	UD Arena (12436); Dayton, OH
12/03/2005*; 8:00 pm, TWTV		Grambling	W 59–55	5–2	UD Arena (12,523); Dayton, OH
12/07/2005*; 7:00 pm, TWTV		Central Michigan	W 61-36	6–2	UD Arena (12,018); Dayton, OH
12/10/2005*; 8:00 pm, WHIO-TV		DePaul	L 54-61	6–3	UD Arena (12,302); Dayton, OH
12/17/2005*; 8:00 pm		Arkansas-Monticello; Las Vegas Holiday Classic	W 63–46	7–3	UD Arena (11,725); Dayton, OH
12/19/2005*; 7:00 pm		Florida A&M; Las Vegas Holiday Classic	W 73–48	8–3	UD Arena (11,810); Dayton, OH
12/22/2005*; 10:30 pm		vs. Cincinnati; Las Vegas Holiday Classic	L 63–81	8–4	Valley HS (1,100); Las Vegas, NV
12/23/2005*; 8:00 pm		vs. Northern Iowa; Las Vegas Holiday Classic	L 67-74	8-5	Valley HS (1,100); Las Vegas, NV
12/30/2005*; 7:00 pm, WHIO-TV		Vanderbilt	L 60-63	8-6	UD Arena (13,162); Dayton, OH
Atlantic 10 regular season
01/04/2006; 7:30 pm		at Fordham	L 56–66	8–7 (0–1)	Rose Hill Gymnasium (1,994); Bornx, NY
01/07/2006; 12:00 pm, A-10 TV		at Charlotte	L 65-73	8–8 (0–2)	UD Arena (12,098); Dayton, OH
01/14/2006; 2:05 pm		at Richmond	L 50–58	8–9 (0–3)	Robins Center (4,108); Richmond, VA
01/18/2006; 7:00 pm, WHIO-TV		Temple	L 51–53	8–10 (0–4)	UD Arena (11,648); Dayton, OH
01/21/2006; 8:00 pm, WHIO-TV		Duquesne	W 85-63	9–10 (1–4)	UD Arena (12,575); Dayton, OH
01/25/2006; 7:00 pm		St. Bonaventure	W 78-58	10–10 (2–4)	UD Arena (1,743); Dayton, OH
01/28/2006; 12:00 pm, A-10 TV		at Xavier; Blackburn/McCafferty Trophy	L 55-60	10–11 (2–5)	Cintas Center (10,250); Cincinnati, OH
02/01/2006; 7:00 pm, WHIO-TV		Saint Joseph's	W 77–69	11–11 (3–5)	UD Arena (11,722); Dayton, OH
02/04/2006; 2:00 pm, ESPN2		at Charlotte	L 49–62	11–12 (3–6)	Halton Arena (9,105); Charlotte, NC
02/08/2006; 7:30 pm		at No. 8 George Washington	L 67-81	11–13 (3–7)	Charles E. Smith Center (5,000); Washington, D.C.
02/11/2006; 4:00 pm		Saint Louis	W 46–44	12–13 (4–7)	UD Arena (13,156); Dayton, OH
02/18/2006; 4:00 pm		at La Salle	L 71–74	12-14 (4–8)	Tom Gola Arena (3,612); Philadelphia, PA
02/21/2006; 7:30 pm, ESPN2		Xavier; Blackburn/McCafferty Trophy	W 66–62	13–14 (5–8)	UD Arena (13,092); Dayton, OH
02/25/2006; 12:00 pm, WHIO-TV		at Massachusetts	L 47-66	13–15 (5–9)	Mullins Center (5,508); Amherst, MA
03/01/2006; 8:00 pm, WHIO-TV		at Saint Louis	W 72-70 ^{ot}	14–15 (6–9)	Savvis Center (10,264); St. Louis, MO
03/04/2007; 12:00 pm, A-10 TV		Rhode Island	L 56-65	14–16 (6–10)	UD Arena (13,435); Dayton, OH
Atlantic 10 tournament
03/08/2006; 2:00 pm		vs. Saint Joseph's; First Round	L 55–67	14-17	U.S. Bank Arena (4,010); Cincinnati, OH
*Non-conference game. ^{#}Rankings from AP Poll. (#) Tournament seedings in parentheses. All times are in Eastern Time.
