= 1986–87 UAB Blazers men's basketball team =

American college basketball season

1986–87 UAB Blazers men's basketball

Sun Belt tournament champions

NCAA tournament
- Conference: Sun Belt Conference
- Record: 22–9 (12–2 Sun Belt)
- Head coach: Gene Bartow (9th season)
- Assistant coaches: Dan Monson (1st season); Tom Massimino; Jimmy Armstrong
- Home arena: BJCC Coliseum

1986–87 Sun Belt Conference men's basketball standings
	Conf.				Overall
Team	W		L	PCT	W		L	PCT
Western Kentucky	12	–	2	.857	29	–	9	.763
Jacksonville	11	–	3	.786	19	–	11	.633
UAB †	10	–	4	.714	21	–	11	.656
Virginia Commonwealth	7	–	7	.500	17	–	14	.548
UNC Charlotte	6	–	8	.429	18	–	14	.563
South Alabama	6	–	8	.429	14	–	14	.500
South Florida	3	–	11	.214	8	–	20	.286
Old Dominion	1	–	13	.071	6	–	22	.214
† 1987 Sun Belt Conference tournament winner Rankings from AP Poll

The 1986–87 UAB Blazers men's basketball team represented the University of Alabama at Birmingham as a member of the Sun Belt Conference during the 1986–87 NCAA Division I men's basketball season. This was head coach Gene Bartow's 9th season at UAB, and the Blazers played their home games at UAB Arena. They finished the season 21–11, 10–4 in Sun Belt play and won the Sun Belt tournament. They received an automatic bid to the NCAA tournament as No. 11 seed in the Southeast region. The Blazers fell in the opening round to eventual Final Four participant Providence, 90–68.

== Roster ==
1986–87 UAB Blazers men's basketball team
Players
Coaches

Pos.	#	Name	Height	Weight	Year	Hometown
G	00	Derrick Cooley	6 ft 5 in (1.96 m)	—		Birmingham, Alabama
G	3	Barry Bearden	5 ft 11 in (1.8 m)	175 lb (79 kg)	Fr	Birmingham, Alabama
G	4	Tracy Foster	6 ft 4 in (1.93 m)	—	Sr	Fort Wayne, Indiana
G	21	Larry Wiksell	6 ft 0 in (1.83 m)	—		Ventura, California
G	24	Michael Charles	6 ft 4 in (1.93 m)	—	Jr	Birmingham, Alabama
G	25	Chris Thomas	6 ft 5 in (1.96 m)	—		Alabaster, Alabama
F	30	Jason Carson	6 ft 8 in (2.03 m)	—	Fr	Pinckneyville, Illinois
C	31	Eddie Collins	6 ft 8 in (2.03 m)	—	Jr	Marion Junction, Alabama
G	32	James Ponder	6 ft 1 in (1.85 m)	175 lb (79 kg)	Sr	Atlanta, Georgia
F	33	Reggie Turner	6 ft 8 in (2.03 m)	—	So	Birmingham, Alabama
F	34	Dylan Howard	6 ft 6 in (1.98 m)	—	So	Fort Wayne, Indiana
F	40	Larry Rembert	6 ft 8 in (2.03 m)	240 lb (109 kg)	Fr	Orrville, Alabama
F	52	William DeVaughn	6 ft 9 in (2.06 m)	225 lb (102 kg)	Fr	Birmingham, Alabama
C	53	Alan Ogg	7 ft 2 in (2.18 m)	230 lb (104 kg)	Fr	Mount Olive, Alabama
F	55	Bruce Baker	6 ft 7 in (2.01 m)	—	Jr	Benton, Illinois

Head coach

- Gene Bartow

Assistant coach(es)

Legend

- (C) Team captain
- (S) Suspended
- (I) Ineligible
- (W) Walk-on
- Injured
- Current redshirt

Roster

== Schedule and results ==
Date time, TV	Rank^{#}	Opponent^{#}	Result	Record	Site (attendance) city, state
Regular season
Nov 28, 1986*		No. 12 Auburn	L 58–68	0–1	Birmingham-Jefferson Civic Center (16,815); Birmingham, Alabama
Nov 29, 1986*		Longwood	W 83–49	1–1	Birmingham-Jefferson Civic Center (2,228); Birmingham, Alabama
Dec 5, 1986*		vs. Hawaii Pacific; Apple Invitational	W 93–75	2–1	Maples Pavilion (3,600); Stanford, California
Dec 6, 1986*		at Stanford; Apple Invitational	L 80–99	2–2	Maples Pavilion (4,635); Stanford, California
Dec 5, 1986*		at Hawaii Pacific	W 66–52	3–2	(125); Kaneohe, Hawaii
Dec 12, 1986*		vs. Monmouth; TCBY Tip-Off	W 86–73	4–2	Statehouse Convention Center (2,983); Little Rock, Arkansas
Dec 13, 1986*		at Arkansas–Little Rock; TCBY Tip-Off	L 73–74	4–3	Statehouse Convention Center (3,092); Little Rock, Arkansas
Dec 20, 1986*		South Carolina State	W 81–67	5–3	Birmingham-Jefferson Civic Center (3,499); Birmingham, Alabama
Dec 29, 1986*		Alaska Anchorage; UAB Classic	W 94–72	6–3	Birmingham-Jefferson Civic Center (6,106); Birmingham, Alabama
Dec 30, 1986*		Middle Tennessee; UAB Classic	W 93–91	7–3	Birmingham-Jefferson Civic Center (6,323); Birmingham, Alabama
Jan 3, 1987		at South Alabama	W 85–80	8–3 (1–0)	Jaguar Gym (4,395); Mobile, Alabama
Jan 5, 1987		Old Dominion	W 64–60	9–3 (2–0)	Birmingham-Jefferson Civic Center (5,311); Birmingham, Alabama
Jan 8, 1987		Jacksonville	L 69–77	9–4 (2–1)	Birmingham-Jefferson Civic Center (7,322); Birmingham, Alabama
Jan 10, 1987		at Western Kentucky	L 67–85	9–5 (2–2)	E.A. Diddle Arena (10,300); Bowling Green, Kentucky
Jan 12, 1987		UNC Charlotte	W 69–46	10–5 (3–2)	Birmingham-Jefferson Civic Center (9,282); Birmingham, Alabama
Jan 17, 1987*		Bradley	W 80–69	11–5	Birmingham-Jefferson Civic Center (6,179); Birmingham, Alabama
Jan 20, 1987		at VCU	W 79–70	12–5 (4–2)	Richmond Coliseum (4,973); Richmond, Virginia
Jan 24, 1987*		No. 8 Temple	L 60–67	12–6	Birmingham-Jefferson Civic Center (8,211); Birmingham, Alabama
Jan 26, 1987		at Jacksonville	W 81–80	13–6 (5–2)	Jacksonville Memorial Coliseum (8,913); Jacksonville, Florida
Jan 31, 1987		at Old Dominion	W 72–70	14–6 (6–2)	Norfolk Scope (6,888); Norfolk, Virginia
Feb 3, 1987*		at West Virginia	L 64–79	14–7	WVU Coliseum (6,048); Morgantown, West Virginia
Feb 5, 1987		VCU	W 79–71	15–7 (7–2)	Birmingham-Jefferson Civic Center (9,129); Birmingham, Alabama
Feb 7, 1987		South Alabama	W 87–76	16–7 (8–2)	Birmingham-Jefferson Civic Center (11,172); Birmingham, Alabama
Feb 9, 1987		South Florida	L 67–81	16–8 (8–3)	Birmingham-Jefferson Civic Center (10,172); Birmingham, Alabama
Feb 12, 1987		at UNC Charlotte	L 67–76	16–9 (8–4)	Charlotte Coliseum (4,422); Charlotte, North Carolina
Feb 14, 1987*		No. 5 DePaul	L 71–83	16–10	Birmingham-Jefferson Civic Center (8,352); Birmingham, Alabama
Feb 18, 1987		at South Florida	W 67–58	17–10 (9–4)	Sun Dome (2,387); Tampa, Florida
Feb 21, 1987		Western Kentucky	W 86–73	18–10 (10–4)	Birmingham-Jefferson Civic Center (8,706); Birmingham, Alabama
Sun Belt tournament
Feb 26, 1987*		vs. South Alabama; Quarterfinals	W 77–64	19–10	E. A. Diddle Arena (8,000); Bowling Green, Kentucky
Feb 27, 1987*		vs. Jacksonville; Semifinals	W 93–86	20–10	E. A. Diddle Arena (8,000); Bowling Green, Kentucky
Feb 28, 1987*		at Western Kentucky; Championship game	W 72–70	21–10	E. A. Diddle Arena (11,300); Bowling Green, Kentucky
NCAA tournament
Mar 12, 1987*	(11 SE)	vs. (6 SE) Providence; First round	L 68–90	21–11	Birmingham-Jefferson Civic Center (11,513); Birmingham, Alabama
*Non-conference game. ^{#}Rankings from AP poll. (#) Tournament seedings in parentheses. SE=Southeast.
