= 2005–06 Saint Joseph's Hawks men's basketball team =

American college basketball season

2005–06 Saint Joseph's Hawks men's basketball
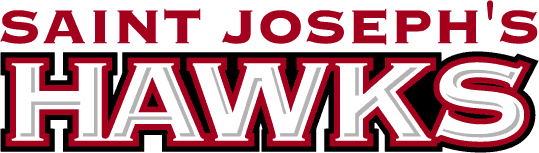

NIT, Second Round
- Conference: Atlantic 10 Conference
- Record: 19–14 (9–7 A-10)
- Head coach: Phil Martelli (11th season)
- Assistant coaches: Monté Ross (10th season); Mark Bass (7th season); Mike Rice Jr. (2nd season)
- Home arena: Alumni Memorial Fieldhouse

2005–06 Atlantic 10 men's basketball standings
	Conf.				Overall
Team	W		L	PCT	W		L	PCT
No. 14 George Washington	16	–	0	1.000	27	–	3	.900
Charlotte	11	–	5	.688	19	–	13	.594
La Salle	10	–	6	.625	18	–	10	.643
Saint Louis	10	–	6	.625	16	–	13	.552
Saint Joseph's	9	–	7	.563	19	–	14	.576
Fordham	9	–	7	.563	16	–	16	.500
Xavier †	8	–	8	.500	21	–	11	.656
Temple	8	–	8	.500	17	–	15	.531
Rhode Island	8	–	8	.500	14	–	14	.500
UMass	8	–	8	.500	13	–	15	.464
Dayton	6	–	10	.375	14	–	17	.452
Richmond	6	–	10	.375	13	–	17	.433
St. Bonaventure	2	–	14	.125	8	–	19	.296
Duquesne	1	–	15	.063	3	–	24	.111
† 2006 Atlantic 10 Tournament winner Rankings from AP Poll

The 2005–06 Saint Joseph's Hawks men's basketball team represented Saint Joseph's University in the 2005–06 NCAA Division I men's basketball season. Led by head coach Phil Martelli in his 11th season, the Hawks would end the regular season tied for fifth in the A-10 standings, the Hawks reached the championship game of the A-10 tournament before losing to Xavier. They were invited to the NIT where they defeated Rutgers before losing to Hofstra in the second round to finish the season with a record of 19–14 (9–7 A-10).

== Schedule and results ==
Date time, TV	Rank^{#}	Opponent^{#}	Result	Record	Site city, state
Regular season
Nov 18, 2005*; 8:00 p.m.		Lafayette	W 70–47	1–0	Alumni Memorial Fieldhouse (3,200); Philadelphia, Pennsylvania
Nov 21, 2005*; 7:30 p.m.		at Fairfield	W 72–41	2–0	Arena at Harbor Yard (2,936); Bridgeport, Connecticut
Nov 26, 2005*; 2:00 p.m.		at Davidson	L 94–100 ^{OT}	2–1	John M. Belk Arena (3,544); Davidson, North Carolina
Nov 29, 2005*; 6:00 p.m.		at Drexel	W 69–59	3–1	The Palestra (6,259); Philadelphia, Pennsylvania
Dec 6, 2005*; 7:00 p.m., ESPN		vs. Kansas; Jimmy V Classic	W 70–67	4–1	Madison Square Garden (10,967); New York, New York
Dec 10, 2005*; 2:00 p.m., ESPN		Ohio State	L 74–81	4–2	The Palestra (7,241); Philadelphia, Pennsylvania
Dec 21, 2005*; 7:00 p.m.		at Bucknell	L 51–63	4–3	Sojka Pavilion (4,252); Lewisburg, Pennsylvania
Dec 28, 2005*; 10:00 p.m.		at Saint Mary's	W 70–66	5–3	McKeon Pavilion (2,267); Moraga, California
Dec. 31, 2005*; 6:00 p.m., ESPN2		at No. 8 Gonzaga	L 94–102	5–4	McCarthey Athletic Center (6,000); Spokane, Washington
Jan 4, 2006; 6:00 p.m., CSN		Xavier	L 58–62	5–5 (0–1)	Alumni Memorial Fieldhouse (3,200); Philadelphia, Pennsylvania
Jan 8, 2006; 12:00 p.m., CSN		Temple	W 59–57	6–5 (1–1)	The Palestra (8,505); Philadelphia, Pennsylvania
Jan 11, 2006; 8:00 p.m.		at UMass	L 58–68	6–6 (1–2)	Mullins Center (4,122); Amherst, Massachusetts
Jan 14, 2006; 2:00 p.m.		at No. 17 George Washington	L 70–82	6–7 (1–3)	Charles E. Smith Center (4,356); Washington, D.C.
Jan 17, 2006; 7:00 p.m., ESPN2		Charlotte	L 50–57	6–8 (1–4)	Alumni Memorial Fieldhouse (3,200); Philadelphia, Pennsylvania
Jan 21, 2006; 12:00 p.m., CSN		La Salle; Philadelphia Big 5	W 66–54	7–8 (2–4)	The Palestra (8,521); Philadelphia, Pennsylvania
Jan 25, 2006; 8:00 p.m.		at Saint Louis	W 54–39	8–8 (3–4)	Savvis Center (8,874); St. Louis, Missouri
Jan 28, 2006*; 7:00 p.m., CN8		at Penn; Philadelphia Big 5	W 47–44	9–8	The Palestra (8,722); Philadelphia, Pennsylvania
Feb 1, 2006; 7:00 p.m.		at Dayton	L 69–77	9–9 (3–5)	University of Dayton Arena (11,722); Dayton, Ohio
Feb 4, 2006; 12:00 p.m., CSN		St. Bonaventure	W 82–51	10–9 (4–5)	Alumni Memorial Fieldhouse (3,200); Philadelphia, Pennsylvania
Feb 7, 2006*; 7:30 p.m., ESPN2		vs. No. 4 Villanova; Philadelphia Big 5	L 58–71	10–10	The Palestra (8,722); Philadelphia, Pennsylvania
Feb 11, 2006; 2:00 p.m., ESPN2		No. 8 George Washington	L 62–64	10–11 (4–6)	Alumni Memorial Fieldhouse (3,200); Philadelphia, Pennsylvania
Feb 14, 2006; 7:30 p.m., ESPN2		at Temple; Philadelphia Big 5	L 44–57	10–12 (4–7)	Liacouras Center (5,345); Philadelphia, Pennsylvania
Feb 18, 2006; 4:00 p.m., CSN		at Rhode Island	W 57–55	11–12 (5–7)	Ryan Center (5,933); Kingston, Rhode Island
Feb 22, 2006; 7:00 p.m., CN8		Fordham	W 64–58	12–12 (6–7)	Alumni Memorial Fieldhouse (3,200); Philadelphia, Pennsylvania
Feb 25, 2006; 12:00 p.m., CSN		Richmond	W 70–39	13–12 (7–7)	Alumni Memorial Fieldhouse (3,200); Philadelphia, Pennsylvania
Feb 28, 2006; 7:30 p.m., ESPN2		at Xavier	W 68–58	14–12 (8–7)	Cintas Center (9,512); Cincinnati, Ohio
Mar 4, 2006; 12:00 p.m.		at Duquesne	W 79–63	15–12 (9–7)	A.J. Palumbo Center (1,422); Pittsburgh, Pennsylvania
Atlantic 10 Tournament
Mar 8, 2006; 2:00 p.m., CSN	(5)	vs. (12) Dayton; First round	W 67–55	16–12	U.S. Bank Arena (4,010); Cincinnati, Ohio
Mar 9, 2006; 2:00 p.m., CSN	(5)	vs. (4) Saint Louis; Quarterfinals	W 56–37	17–12	U.S. Bank Arena (4,407); Cincinnati, Ohio
Mar 10, 2006; 6:30 p.m., CSN	(5)	vs. (9) Temple; Semifinals	W 73–59	18–12	U.S. Bank Arena (8,733); Cincinnati, Ohio
Mar 11, 2006; 6:00 p.m., ESPN	(5)	vs. (10) Xavier; Championship	L 61–62	18–13	U.S. Bank Arena (9,373); Cincinnati, Ohio
NIT
Mar 16, 2006*; 7:00 p.m.	(2)	(8) Rutgers; First round	W 71–62	19–13	Alumni Memorial Fieldhouse (3,200); Philadelphia, Pennsylvania
Mar 20, 2006*; 7:00 p.m., ESPNU	(2)	(3) Hofstra; Second round	L 75–77 ^{OT}	19–14	Alumni Memorial Fieldhouse (3,200); Philadelphia, Pennsylvania
*Non-conference game. ^{#}Rankings from AP Poll. (#) Tournament seedings in parentheses. All times are in Eastern Time.
