= 2005–06 Xavier Musketeers men's basketball team =

American college basketball season

2005–06 Xavier Musketeers men's basketball

A-10 tournament champions

NCAA tournament, First round
- Conference: Atlantic 10 Conference
- Record: 21–11 (8–8 A-10)
- Head coach: Sean Miller (2nd season)
- Assistant coaches: Chris Mack; James Whitford
- Home arena: Cintas Center

2005–06 Atlantic 10 men's basketball standings
	Conf.				Overall
Team	W		L	PCT	W		L	PCT
No. 14 George Washington	16	–	0	1.000	27	–	3	.900
Charlotte	11	–	5	.688	19	–	13	.594
La Salle	10	–	6	.625	18	–	10	.643
Saint Louis	10	–	6	.625	16	–	13	.552
Saint Joseph's	9	–	7	.563	19	–	14	.576
Fordham	9	–	7	.563	16	–	16	.500
Xavier †	8	–	8	.500	21	–	11	.656
Temple	8	–	8	.500	17	–	15	.531
Rhode Island	8	–	8	.500	14	–	14	.500
UMass	8	–	8	.500	13	–	15	.464
Dayton	6	–	10	.375	14	–	17	.452
Richmond	6	–	10	.375	13	–	17	.433
St. Bonaventure	2	–	14	.125	8	–	19	.296
Duquesne	1	–	15	.063	3	–	24	.111
† 2006 Atlantic 10 Tournament winner Rankings from AP Poll

The 2005–06 Xavier Musketeers men's basketball team represented Xavier University in the 2005–06 college basketball season. They were led by head coach Sean Miller in his second season at Xavier. The Musketeers were members of the Atlantic 10 Conference and played their home games at the Cintas Center. Xavier finished the season with a record of 21–11, 8–8 in A-10 play to finish seventh in the regular season standings. The Musketeers won four games in four days to capture the A-10 tournament title and secure the conference's automatic bid to the NCAA tournament. Playing as the No. 14 seed in the Oakland region, Xavier lost to No. 3 seed Gonzaga, 79–75, in the opening round.

== Roster ==
2005–06 Xavier Musketeers men's basketball team
Players
Coaches

Pos.	#	Name	Height	Weight	Year	Previous school	Hometown
F	1	Josh Duncan	6 ft 8 in (2.03 m)	225 lb (102 kg)	So	Moeller HS	Cincinnati, OH
F	2	Brian Thornton	6 ft 8 in (2.03 m)	244 lb (111 kg)	Sr	Louisville, KY
F	3	Justin Cage	6 ft 6 in (1.98 m)	225 lb (102 kg)	Jr	Pike HS	Indianapolis, IN
F	5	Derrick Brown	6 ft 8 in (2.03 m)	225 lb (102 kg)	Fr	Chaminade Julienne HS	Dayton, OH
G/F	11	B. J. Raymond	6 ft 6 in (1.98 m)	225 lb (102 kg)	Fr	St. John's Jesuit HS	Toledo, OH
G	14	Johnny Wolf	6 ft 2 in (1.88 m)	185 lb (84 kg)	Fr	St. Xavier HS	Cincinnati, OH
F	15	Justin Doellman	6 ft 9 in (2.06 m)	210 lb (95 kg)	Jr	Ryle HS	Union, KY
G/F	20	C. J. Anderson	6 ft 6 in (1.98 m)	220 lb (100 kg)	Fr	Winton Woods HS	Cincinnati, OH
G	24	Drew Lavender	5 ft 7 in (1.7 m)	153 lb (69 kg)	So	Brookhaven HS	Columbus, OH
F	33	Brandon Cole	6 ft 8 in (2.03 m)	230 lb (104 kg)	Jr	Rich South HS	Richton Park, IL
C	41	Adam Simons	7 ft 0 in (2.13 m)	248 lb (112 kg)	Jr	Walter M. Williams HS	Burlington, NC
F	45	Kevin Waymire	6 ft 7 in (2.01 m)	220 lb (100 kg)	Jr	Roger Bacon HS	Cincinnati, OH

Head coach

- Sean Miller (Pittsburgh)

Assistant coach(es)

- Chris Mack (Xavier)
- James Whitford (Wisconsin)
- Emanuel Richardson

Legend

- (C) Team captain
- (S) Suspended
- (I) Ineligible
- (W) Walk-on
- Injured
- Current redshirt

Roster

== Schedule and results ==
Date time, TV	Rank^{#}	Opponent^{#}	Result	Record	Site (attendance) city, state
Exhibition
Nov 5, 2005*		Northern Kentucky	W 78–44		Cintas Center; Cincinnati, Ohio
Nov 12, 2005*		Tusculum	W 76–57		Cintas Center; Cincinnati, Ohio
Non-conference regular season
Nov 19, 2005*; 7:00 p.m.		Eastern Illinois	W 80–35	1–0	Cintas Center; Cincinnati, Ohio
Nov 26, 2005*; 4:30 p.m.		vs. Purdue	W 74–55	2–0	Conseco Fieldhouse; Indianapolis, Indiana
Nov 29, 2005*; 7:30 p.m.		Coppin State	W 81–56	3–0	Cintas Center; Cincinnati, Ohio
Dec 3, 2005*; 2:00 p.m., ESPN Plus		vs. No. 12 Illinois	L 62–65	3–1	United Center (19,833); Chicago, Illinois
Dec 7, 2005*; 7:30 p.m.		Florida A&M	W 79–51	4–1	Cintas Center; Cincinnati, Ohio
Dec 11, 2005*; 2:00 p.m.		at Miami (OH)	W 75–65	5–1	Millett Hall; Oxford, Ohio
Dec 18, 2005*; 8:00 p.m.		at Creighton	L 59–61	5–2	Qwest Center Omaha; Omaha, Nebraska
Dec 22, 2005*; 7:30 p.m.		Troy	W 78–54	6–2	Cintas Center; Cincinnati, Ohio
Dec 29, 2005*; 7:30 p.m.		Southern	W 73–56	7–2	Cintas Center (10,250); Cincinnati, Ohio
A-10 regular season
Jan 4, 2006; 6:00 p.m.		at Saint Joseph's	W 62–58	8–2 (1–0)	Alumni Memorial Fieldhouse; Philadelphia, Pennsylvania
Jan 7, 2006; 4:00 p.m.		St. Bonaventure	W 99–71	9–2 (2–0)	Cintas Center; Cincinnati, Ohio
Jan 9, 2006*; 7:30 p.m.		Eastern Kentucky	W 82–63	10–2	Cintas Center; Cincinnati, Ohio
Jan 14, 2006; 7:00 p.m.		at Charlotte	W 78–65	11–2 (3–0)	Dale F. Halton Arena; Charlotte, North Carolina
Jan 19, 2006*; 9:00 p.m.		Cincinnati; Crosstown Shootout	W 73–71 ^{OT}	12–2	Cintas Center; Cincinnati, Ohio
Jan 22, 2006; 7:00 p.m.		Saint Louis	L 54–59	12–3 (3–1)	Cintas Center; Cincinnati, Ohio
Jan 25, 2006; 7:00 p.m.		at Temple	L 79–81	12–4 (3–2)	Liacouras Center; Philadelphia, Pennsylvania
Jan 28, 2006; 12:00 p.m., A-10 TV		Dayton; Blackburn/McCafferty Trophy	W 60–55	13–4 (4–2)	Cintas Center (10,250); Cincinnati, Ohio
Feb 2, 2006; 7:00 p.m.		No. 14 George Washington	L 85–89	13–5 (4–3)	Cintas Center (10,250); Cincinnati, Ohio
Feb 5, 2006; 2:00 p.m.		at Saint Louis	L 47–61	13–6 (4–4)	Savvis Center; St. Louis, Missouri
Feb 8, 2006; 7:30 p.m.		at Richmond	W 63–51	14–6 (5–4)	Robins Center; Richmond, Virginia
Feb 11, 2006; 12:00 p.m.		La Salle	L 70–79	14–7 (5–5)	Cintas Center; Cincinnati, Ohio
Feb 15, 2006; 7:30 p.m.		Fordham	W 84–64	15–7 (6–5)	Cintas Center; Cincinnati, Ohio
Feb 18, 2006; 12:00 p.m.		Duquesne	W 91–70	16–7 (7–5)	Cintas Center; Cincinnati, Ohio
Feb 21, 2006; 7:30 p.m., ESPN2		at Dayton; Blackburn/McCafferty Trophy	L 62–66	16–8 (7–6)	UD Arena (13,092); Dayton, Ohio
Feb 25, 2006; 7:00 p.m.		at Rhode Island	W 85–76	17–8 (8–6)	Ryan Center; Kingston, Rhode Island
Feb 28, 2006; 7:30 p.m.		Saint Joseph's	L 58–68	17–9 (8–7)	Cintas Center; Cincinnati, Ohio
Mar 4, 2006; 4:00 p.m.		at UMass	L 56–65	17–10 (8–8)	Mullins Center; Amherst, Massachusetts
A-10 tournament
Mar 8, 2006*; 6:30 p.m.	(10)	(7) UMass; First round	W 75–66	18–10	Riverfront Coliseum; Cincinnati, Ohio
Mar 9, 2006*; 6:30 p.m.	(10)	(2) Charlotte; Quarterfinals	W 59–55	19–10	Riverfront Coliseum; Cincinnati, Ohio
Mar 10, 2006*; 8:30 p.m.	(10)	(6) Fordham; Semifinals	W 70–59	20–10	Riverfront Coliseum; Cincinnati, Ohio
Mar 11, 2006*; 6:05 p.m.	(10)	(5) Saint Joseph's; Championship game	W 62–61	21–10	Riverfront Coliseum; Cincinnati, Ohio
NCAA tournament
Mar 16, 2006*; 7:20 p.m., CBS	(14 OAK)	vs. (3 OAK) No. 5 Gonzaga; First round	L 75–79	21–11	Jon M. Huntsman Center; Salt Lake City, Utah
*Non-conference game. ^{#}Rankings from AP Poll. (#) Tournament seedings in parentheses. OAK=Oakland.
