= Clayton, New Jersey =

Borough in New Jersey, United States

- Borough
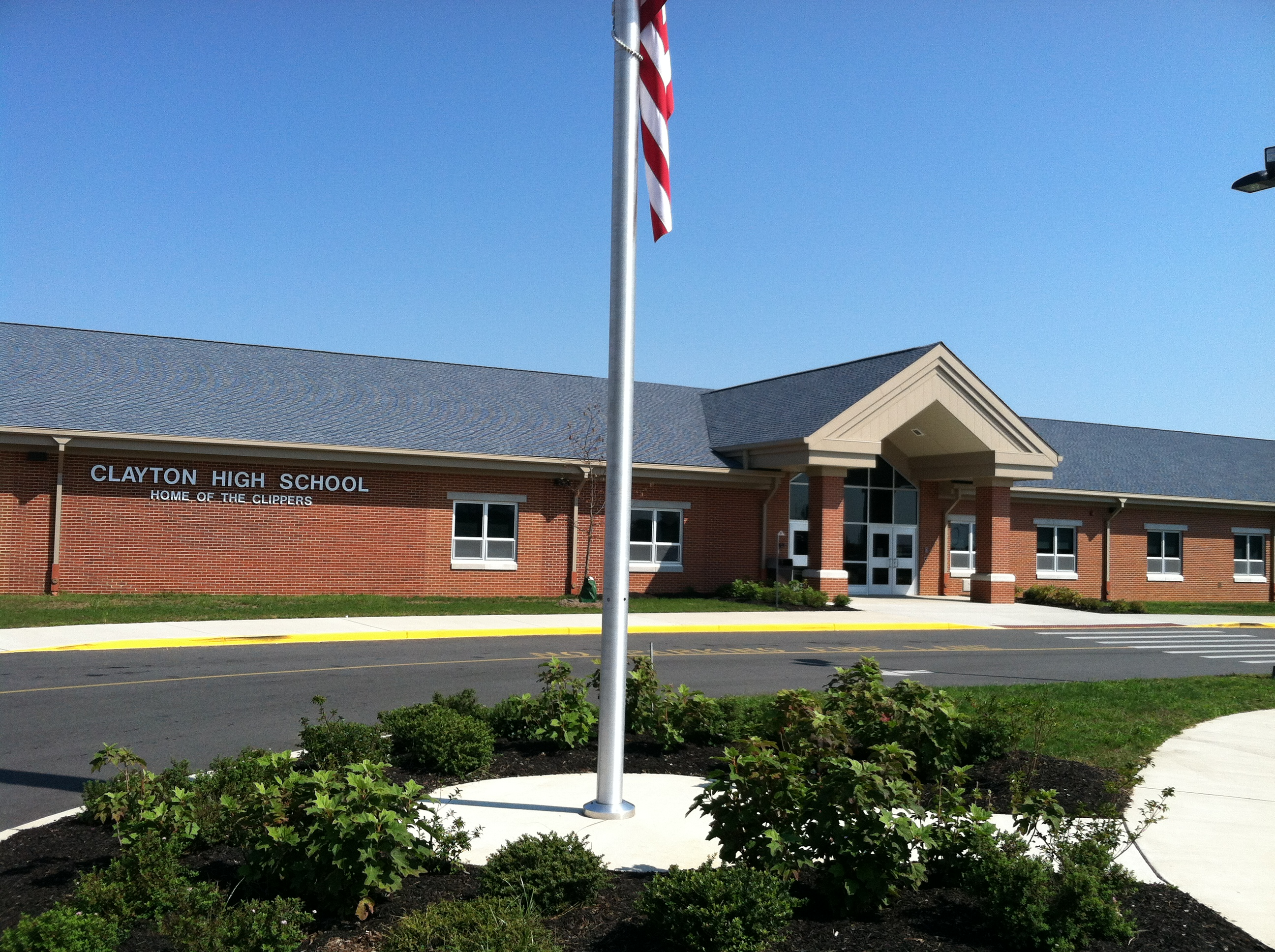
- Clayton High School in September 2012

- Seal
- Motto: "A great place to live and play to work and pray!"
- Location of Clayton in Gloucester County highlighted in red (left). Inset map: Location of Gloucester County in New Jersey highlighted in orange (right).

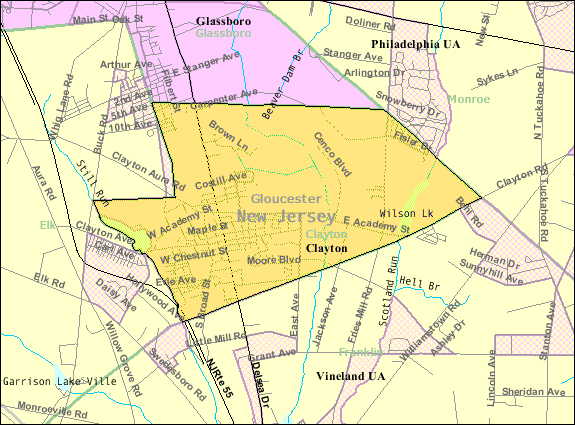
- Census Bureau map of Clayton, New Jersey

- Location in Gloucester County Location in New Jersey Location in the United States
- Coordinates: 39.663736°N 75.077505°W
- Country: United States
- State: New Jersey
- County: Gloucester
- Incorporated: February 5, 1858 (as township)
- Reincorporated: May 9, 1887 (as borough)

Government
  - Type: Borough (New Jersey)
  - Body: Borough Council
  - Mayor: Charles Simon (D, term ends December 31, 2027)
  - Administrator: Susan Miller
  - Municipal clerk: Christine Newcomb

Area
  - Total: 7.26 sq mi (18.80 km^{2})
  - Land: 7.07 sq mi (18.32 km^{2})
  - Water: 0.19 sq mi (0.48 km^{2}) 2.53%
  - Rank: 239th of 565 in state 15th of 24 in county
- Elevation: 121 ft (37 m)

Population (2020)
  - Total: 8,807
  - Estimate (2023): 8,948
  - Rank: 270th of 565 in state 12th of 24 in county
  - Density: 1,244.8/sq mi (480.6/km^{2})
  - Rank: 356th of 565 in state 13th of 24 in county
- Time zone: UTC−05:00 (Eastern (EST))
  - Summer (DST): UTC−04:00 (Eastern (EDT))
- ZIP Code: 08312
- Area code: 856 exchanges: 307, 442, 863, 881
- FIPS code: 3401513360
- GNIS feature ID: 0885185
- Website: www.claytonnj.com

Clayton is a borough in Gloucester County, New Jersey, United States. As of the 2020 United States census, the borough's population was 8,807, an increase of 628 (+7.7%) from the 2010 census count of 8,179, which in turn reflected an increase of 1,040 (+14.6%) from the 7,139 counted in the 2000 census.

Jacob Fisler purchased much of the area that is now Clayton, acquiring 6,500 acres (2,600 ha) of land after the American Revolutionary War. A settlement named Fislertown developed and grew to 36 families by 1812. A glass factory was established in Clayton in the 1850s by one of Fisler's descendants, which contributed to Fislertown's growth.

What is now Clayton was formed as Clayton Township on February 5, 1858, from portions of Franklin Township. Portions of the township were later taken on March 11, 1878, to form Glassboro Township. Clayton was formed as a borough by the New Jersey Legislature on May 9, 1887, from portions of Clayton Township. The remainder of Clayton Township was absorbed by the Clayton on April 14, 1908, and the township was dissolved. Clayton is part of the South Jersey region of the state.

== Geography ==
According to the U.S. Census Bureau, the borough had a total area of 7.26 square miles (18.80 km^{2}), including 7.08 square miles (18.32 km^{2}) of land and 0.18 square miles (0.48 km^{2}) of water (2.53%). Unincorporated communities, localities and place names located partially or completely within the borough include Silver Lake. Clayton borders Elk Township, Franklin Township, Glassboro, and Monroe Township.

== Demographics ==
Historical population
Census	Pop.	Note	%±
1860	2,490		—
1870	3,674		47.6%
1880	1,981	*	−46.1%
1890	2,299		16.1%
1900	1,989		−13.5%
1910	1,926		−3.2%
1920	1,905		−1.1%
1930	2,351		23.4%
1940	2,320		−1.3%
1950	3,023		30.3%
1960	4,711		55.8%
1970	5,193		10.2%
1980	6,013		15.8%
1990	6,155		2.4%
2000	7,139		16.0%
2010	8,179		14.6%
2020	8,807		7.7%
2023 (est.)	8,948	▲	1.6%
Population sources: 1860–2000 1860–1920; 1860–1870 1870 1880–1890; 1890–1910 1910–1930; 1940–2000 2000; 2010 2020 *= Lost territory in previous decade.

=== 2020 census ===
As of the 2020 census, Clayton had a population of 8,807. The median age was 39.9 years. 23.7% of residents were under the age of 18 and 17.3% of residents were 65 years of age or older. For every 100 females there were 94.0 males, and for every 100 females age 18 and over there were 90.4 males age 18 and over.

95.4% of residents lived in urban areas, while 4.6% lived in rural areas.

There were 3,229 households in Clayton, of which 33.4% had children under the age of 18 living in them. Of all households, 48.0% were married-couple households, 16.3% were households with a male householder and no spouse or partner present, and 27.9% were households with a female householder and no spouse or partner present. About 22.9% of all households were made up of individuals and 11.9% had someone living alone who was 65 years of age or older.

There were 3,433 housing units, of which 5.9% were vacant. The homeowner vacancy rate was 1.7% and the rental vacancy rate was 5.1%.

Racial composition as of the 2020 census
Race	Number	Percent
White	5,635	64.0%
Black or African American	1,735	19.7%
American Indian and Alaska Native	34	0.4%
Asian	180	2.0%
Native Hawaiian and Other Pacific Islander	1	0.0%
Some other race	319	3.6%
Two or more races	903	10.3%
Hispanic or Latino (of any race)	833	9.5%

=== 2010 census ===
The 2010 United States census counted 8,179 people, 2,916 households, and 2,105 families in the borough. The population density was 1,145.5 per square mile (442.3/km^{2}). There were 3,128 housing units at an average density of 438.1 per square mile (169.2/km^{2}). The racial makeup was 74.83% (6,120) White, 18.01% (1,473) Black or African American, 0.37% (30) Native American, 1.80% (147) Asian, 0.02% (2) Pacific Islander, 1.59% (130) from other races, and 3.39% (277) from two or more races. Hispanic or Latino of any race were 5.95% (487) of the population.

Of the 2,916 households, 34.1% had children under the age of 18; 51.4% were married couples living together; 14.7% had a female householder with no husband present and 27.8% were non-families. Of all households, 22.1% were made up of individuals and 8.7% had someone living alone who was 65 years of age or older. The average household size was 2.80 and the average family size was 3.27.

26.3% of the population were under the age of 18, 8.2% from 18 to 24, 27.8% from 25 to 44, 27.5% from 45 to 64, and 10.2% who were 65 years of age or older. The median age was 36.2 years. For every 100 females, the population had 92.9 males. For every 100 females ages 18 and older there were 89.1 males. The Census Bureau's 2006–2010 American Community Survey showed that (in 2010 inflation-adjusted dollars) median household income was $70,299 (with a margin of error of +/− $5,649) and the median family income was $70,989 (+/− $5,101). Males had a median income of $52,048 (+/− $6,973) versus $39,524 (+/− $6,308) for females. The per capita income for the borough was $27,437 (+/− $2,649). About 9.6% of families and 11.7% of the population were below the poverty line, including 16.9% of those under age 18 and 8.0% of those age 65 or over.

=== 2000 census ===
As of the 2000 U.S. census there were 7,139 people, 2,464 households, and 1,884 families residing in the borough. The population density was 994.2 inhabitants per square mile (383.9/km^{2}). There were 2,680 housing units at an average density of 373.2 per square mile (144.1/km^{2}). The racial makeup of the borough was 79.23% White, 16.05% African American, 0.42% Native American, 0.66% Asian, 0.03% Pacific Islander, 0.95% from other races, and 2.66% from two or more races. Hispanic or Latino of any race were 3.28% of the population.

There were 2,464 households, out of which 39.4% had children under the age of 18 living with them, 57.5% were married couples living together, 13.9% had a female householder with no husband present, and 23.5% were non-families. 19.7% of all households were made up of individuals, and 7.5% had someone living alone who was 65 years of age or older. The average household size was 2.89 and the average family size was 3.31.

In the borough the population was spread out, with 29.1% under the age of 18, 8.7% from 18 to 24, 31.6% from 25 to 44, 21.0% from 45 to 64, and 9.6% who were 65 years of age or older. The median age was 34 years. For every 100 females, there were 91.7 males. For every 100 females age 18 and over, there were 89.8 males.

The median income for a household in the borough was $53,219, and the median income for a family was $63,097. Males had a median income of $37,231 versus $29,063 for females. The per capita income for the borough was $20,006. About 3.1% of families and 2.9% of the population were below the poverty line, including 4.0% of those under age 18 and 1.7% of those age 65 or over.

== Parks and recreation ==
Parkland covers about a third of the borough and includes both municipal and state parks. The Glassboro Wildlife Management Area covers almost 2,400 acres (970 ha) in portions of Clayton, Glassboro, and Monroe Township.

== Government ==
=== Local government ===
Clayton is governed under the borough form of New Jersey municipal government, which is used in 218 of New Jersey's 564 municipalities, making it the state's most common form of government. The governing body is comprised of a mayor and a borough council with all positions elected at-large on a partisan basis as part of the November general election. The mayor is elected by the voters to a four-year term of office. The borough council includes six members elected to serve three-year terms on a staggered basis with two seats coming up for election each year in a three-year cycle. The borough form of government used by Clayton is a weak mayor/strong council government in which council members act as the legislative body with the mayor presiding at meetings and voting only in the event of a tie. The mayor can veto ordinances subject to an override by a two-thirds majority vote of the council. The mayor makes committee and liaison assignments for council members, and most appointments are made by the mayor with the advice and consent of the council.

In March 2019, the borough council selected Christina Moorhouse from three candidates nominated by the Democratic municipal committee to fill the seat vacated by Vonzora Jackson's resignation.

As of 2024, the mayor is Democrat Thomas Bianco, whose term of office ends on December 31, 2027. Members of the Borough Council are Council President Tony Saban (D, 2025), Dave Chapes (D, 2027), Christina Moorhouse (D, 2025), Frank Rollo (D, 2027), Charles Simon (D, 2026) and Darlene Vondran (D, 2026).

Clayton describes itself in its motto as "a great place to live and play, work and pray." The seal, which has been used since the late 1960s, features an image of a factory, a house, a figure fishing off a boat, and with a church with a cross, which was challenged by the Freedom From Religion Foundation in March 2016 as "unmistakably religious" and unconstitutional.

=== Federal, state, and county representation ===
Clayton is located in the 2nd Congressional District and is part of New Jersey's 3rd state legislative district.

For the 119th United States Congress, New Jersey's 2nd congressional district is represented by Jeff Van Drew (R, Dennis Township). New Jersey is represented in the United States Senate by Democrats Cory Booker (Newark, term ends 2027) and Andy Kim (Moorestown, term ends 2031).

For the 2026–2027 session, the 3rd legislative district of the New Jersey Legislature is represented in the State Senate by John Burzichelli (D, Paulsboro) and in the General Assembly by David Bailey (D, Woodstown) and Heather Simmons (D, Glassboro).

Gloucester County is governed by a board of county commissioners, whose seven members are elected at-large to three-year terms of office on a staggered basis in partisan elections, with either two or three seats coming up for election each year. At a reorganization meeting held each January, the Board selects a Director and a Deputy Director from among its members. As of 2025, Gloucester County's Commissioners are:

Director Frank J. DiMarco (D, Deptford Township, 2025), Matt Weng (D, Pitman, 2026), Joann Gattinelli (D, Washington Township, 2026), Nicholas DeSilvio (R, Franklin Township, 2027), Denice DiCarlo (D, West Deptford Township, 2025) Deputy Director Jim Jefferson (D, Woodbury, 2026) and Christopher Konawel Jr. (R, Glassboro, 2027).

Gloucester County's constitutional officers are: Clerk James N. Hogan (D, Franklin Township; 2027), Sheriff Carmel Morina (D, Greenwich Township; 2027) and Surrogate Giuseppe "Joe" Chila (D, Woolwich Township; 2028).

=== Politics ===
United States presidential election results for Clayton 2024 2020 2016 2012 2008 2004
Year	Republican		Democratic		Third party(ies)	
Year	No.	%	No.	%	No.	%
2024	2,024	45.29%	2,363	52.88%	82	1.83%
2020	2,058	43.49%	2,609	55.14%	65	1.37%
2016	1,655	43.89%	1,980	52.51%	136	3.61%
2012	1,206	34.48%	2,247	64.24%	45	1.29%
2008	1,309	36.08%	2,270	62.57%	49	1.35%
2004	1,427	44.76%	1,745	54.74%	16	0.50%

As of March 2011, there were a total of 4,874 registered voters in Clayton. Of these, 1,755 (36.0%) were registered as Democrats, 819 (16.8%) were registered as Republicans, and 2,296 (47.1%) were registered as Unaffiliated. There were four voters registered as Libertarians or Greens.

In the 2012 presidential election, Democrat Barack Obama received 64.2% of the vote (2,247 cast), ahead of Republican Mitt Romney with 34.5% (1,206 votes), and other candidates with 1.3% (45 votes), among the 3,521 ballots cast by the borough's 5,164 registered voters (23 ballots were spoiled), for a turnout of 68.2%. In the 2008 presidential election, Democrat Barack Obama received 62.1% of the vote (2,270 cast), ahead of Republican John McCain with 35.8% (1,309 votes) and other candidates with 1.3% (49 votes), among the 3,653 ballots cast by the borough's 5,090 registered voters, for a turnout of 71.8%. In the 2004 presidential election, Democrat John Kerry received 54.5% of the vote (1,745 ballots cast), outpolling Republican George W. Bush with 44.6% (1,427 votes) and other candidates with 0.4% (16 votes), among the 3,201 ballots cast by the borough's 4,410 registered voters, for a turnout percentage of 72.6.

Gubernatorial election results for Clayton
Year	Republican		Democratic		Third party(ies)	
Year	No.	%	No.	%	No.	%
2025	1,512	41.32%	2,120	57.94%	27	0.74%
2021	1,413	49.23%	1,423	49.58%	34	1.18%
2017	749	36.01%	1,282	61.63%	49	2.36%
2013	1,133	56.65%	837	41.85%	30	1.50%
2009	871	40.64%	1,055	49.23%	217	10.13%
2005	748	38.05%	1,117	56.82%	101	5.14%

In the 2013 gubernatorial election, Republican Chris Christie received 56.7% of the vote (1,133 cast), ahead of Democrat Barbara Buono with 41.9% (837 votes), and other candidates with 1.5% (30 votes), among the 2,039 ballots cast by the borough's 5,133 registered voters (39 ballots were spoiled), for a turnout of 39.7%. In the 2009 gubernatorial election, Democrat Jon Corzine received 48.2% of the vote (1,055 ballots cast), ahead of Republican Chris Christie with 39.8% (871 votes), Independent Chris Daggett with 9.1% (200 votes) and other candidates with 0.8% (17 votes) among the 2,191 ballots cast by the borough's 4,947 registered voters, yielding a 44.3% turnout.

United States Senate election results for Clayton1
Year	Republican		Democratic		Third party(ies)	
Year	No.	%	No.	%	No.	%
2024	1,861	43.03%	2,393	55.33%	71	1.64%
2018	1,291	42.95%	1,599	53.19%	116	3.86%
2012	1,040	30.82%	2,239	66.36%	95	2.82%
2006	761	39.59%	1,111	57.80%	50	2.60%

United States Senate election results for Clayton2
Year	Republican		Democratic		Third party(ies)	
Year	No.	%	No.	%	No.	%
2020	1,970	42.29%	2,589	55.58%	99	2.13%
2014	642	37.43%	1,033	60.23%	40	2.33%
2013	428	39.45%	650	59.91%	7	0.65%
2008	1,164	34.05%	2,174	63.59%	81	2.37%

== Education ==
The Clayton Public Schools serve public school students in pre-kindergarten through twelfth grade. As of the 2024–25 school year, the district, comprised of three schools, had an enrollment of 1,489 students and 124.0 classroom teachers (on an FTE basis), for a student–teacher ratio of 12.0:1. Schools in the district (with 2024–25 enrollment data from the National Center for Education Statistics) are Herma S. Simmons Elementary School with 715 students in grades PreK-5, Clayton Middle School with 299 students in grades 6-8 and Clayton High School with 431 students in grades 9-12.

Students in Gloucester County are eligible to apply to attend Gloucester County Institute of Technology, a four-year high school in Deptford Township that provides technical and vocational education programs. As a public school, students and their families do not pay tuition to attend the school.

Formed from a merger of two regional schools, St. Michael the Archangel Regional School is a K–8 school that operates under the supervision of the Roman Catholic Diocese of Camden. The former St. Catherine of Siena Regional School in Clayton merged with St. Michael in 2008.

== Transportation ==
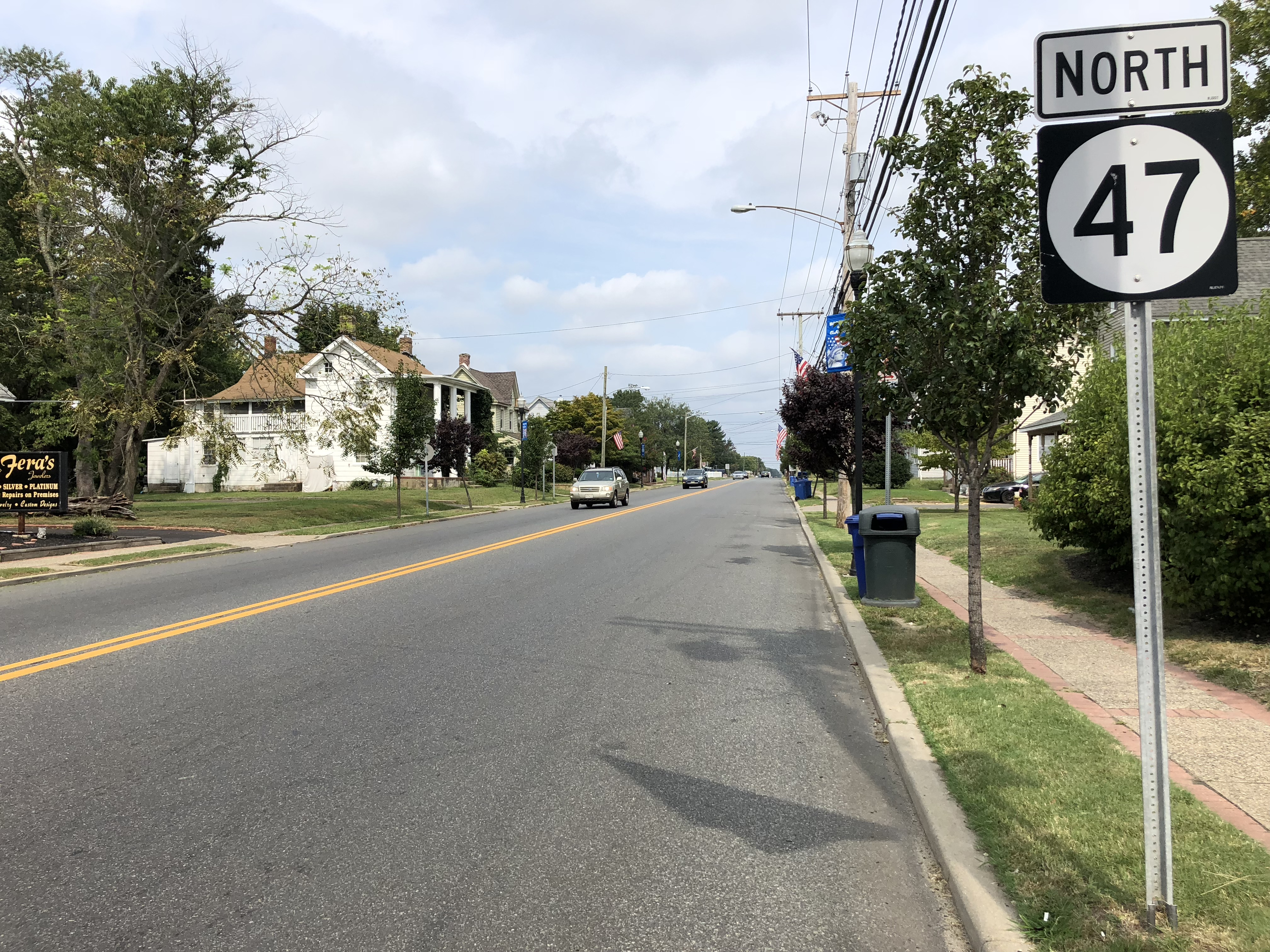
Route 47 northbound in Clayton

=== Roads and highways ===
As of May 2010, the borough had a total of 44.16 miles (71.07 km) of roadways. Of this, 33.00 miles (53.11 km) is maintained by the municipality, 8.36 miles (13.45 km) by Gloucester County and 2.80 miles (4.51 km) by the New Jersey Department of Transportation.

The main thoroughfare that passes through is Route 47. Route 55 traverses the borough's southwestern edge, but the closest interchanges are in neighboring communities. A sliver of County Road 553 clips the borough's western edge.

=== Public transportation ===
NJ Transit bus service is available between the borough and Philadelphia on its 313 and 408 routes.

== Notable people ==
People who were born in, residents of, or otherwise closely associated with Clayton include:

- Daniel Dalton (born 1949), politician who served as New Jersey Senate Majority Leader and as Secretary of State of New Jersey
- T. James Ferrell (1939–2020), engraver and medalist best known for his work for The Franklin Mint
- Sunny Gale (1927–2022), pop singer who had her biggest hit with a cover version of "Wheel of Fortune" in 1952
- Granger Hall (born 1962), former professional basketball player
- Earl C. Long (1883–1983), U.S. Marine Corps Major General during World War II who commanded Service Command, Fleet Marine Force Pacific
- Nick Rodriguez (born 1996), submission grappler who competes in no-gi matches
- Mel Sheppard (1883–1942), middle-distance runner who won four gold medals at the 1908 Summer Olympics and 1912 Summer Olympics
