= Clayton High School (New Jersey) =

High school in Gloucester County, New Jersey, US

Location
- 55 Pop Kramer Boulevard; Clayton, Gloucester County, New Jersey 08312; United States; 39.66278°N 75.086199°W

Information
- Type: Public high school
- Motto: "Preparing Students for Opportunities of the Future"
- School district: Clayton Public Schools
- NCES School ID: 340318002498
- Principal: Matt Slater
- Faculty: 36.0 FTEs
- Enrollment: 431 (as of 2024–25)
- Student to teacher ratio: 12.0:1
- Colors: Navy blue gold
- Athletics conference: Tri-County Conference (general); West Jersey Football League (football)
- Team name: Clippers
- Information: Member of the NJ Interdistrict School Choice Program
- Website: www.claytonps.org/o/chs

Clayton High School is a comprehensive community public high school that serves students in ninth through twelfth grades from Clayton, in Gloucester County, in the U.S. state of New Jersey, operating as the lone secondary school of the Clayton Public Schools.

As of the 2024–25 school year, the school had an enrollment of 431 students and 36.0 classroom teachers (on an FTE basis), for a student–teacher ratio of 12.0:1. There were 218 students (50.6% of enrollment) eligible for free lunch and 24 (5.6% of students) eligible for reduced-cost lunch.

== Awards, recognition and rankings ==
Clayton High School was named by U.S. News & World Report as one of the "Best High Schools" in New Jersey in 2012–2013.

The school was the 273rd-ranked public high school in New Jersey out of 339 schools statewide in New Jersey Monthly magazine's September 2014 cover story on the state's "Top Public High Schools", using a new ranking methodology. The school had been ranked 184th in the state of 328 schools in 2012, after being ranked 224th in 2010 out of 322 schools listed. The magazine ranked the school 210th in 2008 out of 316 schools. The school was ranked 244th in the magazine's September 2006 issue, which surveyed 316 schools across the state.

In the 1997–98 school year, Clayton High School was recognized by the New Jersey Department of Education as a Best Practice School for its Commercial Art program in the Public Engagement category. In 2010, Clayton High School received a bronze medal as one of the Top High Schools in the United States by U.S. News & World Report.

== Athletics ==
The Clayton High School Clippers compete as one of the member schools in the Tri-County Conference, which is comprised of public and private high schools located in Camden, Cape May, Cumberland, Gloucester and Salem counties. The conference is overseen by the New Jersey State Interscholastic Athletic Association (NJSIAA). With 304 students in grades 10–12, the school was classified by the NJSIAA for the 2019–20 school year as Group I for most athletic competition purposes, which included schools with an enrollment of 75 to 476 students in that grade range. The football team competes in the Patriot Division of the 94-team West Jersey Football League superconference and was classified by the NJSIAA as Group I South for football for 2024–2026, which included schools with 185 to 482 students.

The school participates as the host school / lead agency for a joint cooperative wrestling team with Glassboro High School, while Glassboro is the host school for co-op boys / girls swimming and boys / girls tennis teams. These co-op programs operate under agreements scheduled to expire at the end of the 2023–24 school year.

In 1980, the boys' basketball team finished the season with a record of 25–3 after winning the Group I state championship, defeating Mahwah High School by a score of 86–75 in the tournament final.

The softball team won the Group I state championship in 2021 (defeating Whippany Park High School in the tournament final) and 2022 (vs. Weehawken High School).

The boys outdoor track team won the Group I state championship in 2021.

The girls spring / outdoor track team won the Group I state title in 2021 and 2022.

== Curriculum and programs ==
The school operates "Clayton Place", a youth services program that provides counseling and tutoring for high school students.

The high school's "Communications Academy", started in September 2000, provides courses in video production, mass media, journalism, and computer graphics. In 2000, a cable-television sitcom created by a student in one of Clayton High School's video production classes was broadcast on Comcast's Channel 31 in the community.

Clayton High School has received press coverage for offering students distance learning opportunities at Gloucester County College and elsewhere. In 1998, for instance, 15 students from the high school took a Psychology 101 course at the college via a closed-circuit television hookup. In 1999, three students from the school took a Spanish III class given at West Deptford High School via closed-circuit television.

== Administration ==
The school's principal is Matt Slater. His administration team includes the assistant principal / athletic director.

== Notable alumni ==
- T. James Ferrell (1939–2020, class of 1959), engraver and medalist best known for his work for The Franklin Mint
- Granger Hall (born 1962), former professional basketball player
- Leonard H. Kaser (born 1931), lawyer and politician who represented the 3rd legislative district in the New Jersey General Assembly from 1968 to 1969
- Alexander Osayemi (born 2007, class of 2025), sprinter
- Nick Rodriguez (born 1996), former wrestler and current submission grappler
