= 2005–06 Temple Owls men's basketball team =

American college basketball season

2005–06 Temple Owls men's basketball

NIT, Opening Round
- Conference: Atlantic 10 Conference
- Record: 17–15 (8–8 A-10)
- Head coach: John Chaney (24th season)
- Assistant coaches: Dan Leibovitz (10th season); Bill Ellerbee (4th season); Mark Macon (4th season)
- Home arena: Liacouras Center

2005–06 Atlantic 10 men's basketball standings
	Conf.				Overall
Team	W		L	PCT	W		L	PCT
No. 14 George Washington	16	–	0	1.000	27	–	3	.900
Charlotte	11	–	5	.688	19	–	13	.594
La Salle	10	–	6	.625	18	–	10	.643
Saint Louis	10	–	6	.625	16	–	13	.552
Saint Joseph's	9	–	7	.563	19	–	14	.576
Fordham	9	–	7	.563	16	–	16	.500
Xavier †	8	–	8	.500	21	–	11	.656
Temple	8	–	8	.500	17	–	15	.531
Rhode Island	8	–	8	.500	14	–	14	.500
UMass	8	–	8	.500	13	–	15	.464
Dayton	6	–	10	.375	14	–	17	.452
Richmond	6	–	10	.375	13	–	17	.433
St. Bonaventure	2	–	14	.125	8	–	19	.296
Duquesne	1	–	15	.063	3	–	24	.111
† 2006 Atlantic 10 Tournament winner Rankings from AP Poll

The 2005–06 Temple Owls men's basketball team represented Temple University in the 2005–06 NCAA Division I men's basketball season. They were led by head coach John Chaney and played their home games at the Liacouras Center. The Owls are members of the Atlantic 10 Conference. They finished the season 17–15, 8–8 in A-10 play, and reached the 2006 National Invitation Tournament. Chaney retired at the conclusion of the season.

== Roster ==
#	Name	Height	Weight (lbs.)	Position	Class	Hometown		High school
0	Brian Shanahan	6 ft 0 in (1.83 m)	175 pounds (79 kg)	G	Fr.	Haddon Heights, New Jersey	U.S.	Episcopal Academy
1	Chris Clark	5 ft 8 in (1.73 m)	165 pounds (75 kg)	G	So.	Narberth, Pennsylvania	U.S.	St. Joseph's Prep
3	Dustin Salisbery	6 ft 5 in (1.96 m)	205 pounds (93 kg)	G	Jr.	Lancaster, Pennsylvania	U.S.	J.P. McCaskey HS
4	Dion Dacons	6 ft 6 in (1.98 m)	210 pounds (95 kg)	F	Jr.	Statesville, North Carolina	U.S.	Oak Hill Academy
13	Mark Tyndale	6 ft 5 in (1.96 m)	210 pounds (95 kg)	G	So.	Philadelphia, Pennsylvania	U.S.	Simon Gratz HS
15	Semaj Inge	6 ft 4 in (1.93 m)	190 pounds (86 kg)	G	Fr.	Camden, New Jersey	U.S.	Woodrow Wilson HS
22	Dionte Christmas	6 ft 5 in (1.96 m)	205 pounds (93 kg)	G	Fr.	Philadelphia, Pennsylvania	U.S.	Lutheran Christian Academy
24	Antywane Robinson	6 ft 8 in (2.03 m)	210 pounds (95 kg)	F	Sr.	Charlotte, North Carolina	U.S.	Oak Hill Academy
25	Mardy Collins	6 ft 6 in (1.98 m)	205 pounds (93 kg)	G	Sr.	Philadelphia, Pennsylvania	U.S.	Simon Gratz HS
32	DaShone Kirkendoll	6 ft 5 in (1.96 m)	210 pounds (95 kg)	G	So.	Dayton, Ohio	U.S.	Stebbins HS
33	Nehemiah Ingram	6 ft 8 in (2.03 m)	250 pounds (110 kg)	F	Sr.	Milledgeville, Georgia	U.S.	Baldwin HS
40	Nelson Broderick	6 ft 6 in (1.98 m)	200 pounds (91 kg)	F	Fr.	Gaithersburg, Maryland	U.S.	Gaithersburg HS
41	Sergio Olmos	7 ft 0 in (2.13 m)	220 pounds (100 kg)	C	Fr.	Valencia	Spain	Vincente Blasco Ibanez HS
43	Orlando Miller	6 ft 6 in (1.98 m)	190 pounds (86 kg)	F	So.	Lanham, Maryland	U.S.	High Point HS
44	Anthony Ivory	6 ft 10 in (2.08 m)	350 pounds (160 kg)	C	Fr.	Washington, DC	U.S.	Marriott Charter School
50	Wayne Marshall	6 ft 11 in (2.11 m)	285 pounds (129 kg)	C	Jr.	Philadelphia, Pennsylvania	U.S.	Martin Luther King HS
