= Duane Causwell =

American basketball player (born 1968)

Personal information
- Born: May 31, 1968 (age 58) Queens, New York, U.S.
- Listed height: 7 ft 0 in (2.13 m)
- Listed weight: 240 lb (109 kg)

Career information
- High school: Benjamin N. Cardozo (Queens, New York)
- College: Temple (1986–1990)
- NBA draft: 1990: 1st round, 18th overall pick
- Drafted by: Sacramento Kings
- Playing career: 1990–2001
- Position: Center
- Number: 31, 4

Career history
- 1990–1997: Sacramento Kings
- 1997–2001: Miami Heat

Career NBA statistics
- Points: 2,648 (4.9 ppg)
- Rebounds: 2,273 (4.2 rpg)
- Blocks: 767 (1.4 bpg)
- Stats at NBA.com
- Stats at Basketball Reference

Duane Causwell (born May 31, 1968) is an American former professional basketball player who was selected by the Sacramento Kings with the 18th overall pick of the 1990 NBA draft. He played 11 years in the National Basketball Association (NBA) for the Kings and the Miami Heat averaging 4.9 ppg in his career. Causwell played college basketball for the Temple Owls.

Causwell played high school basketball at Benjamin N. Cardozo High School in Queens.
