= Granger Hall (basketball) =

American basketball player

Personal information
- Born: June 18, 1962 (age 64) Newark, New Jersey, U.S.
- Listed height: 6 ft 8 in (2.03 m)
- Listed weight: 200 lb (91 kg)

Career information
- High school: Clayton (Clayton, New Jersey)
- College: Temple (1980–1985)
- NBA draft: 1985: 4th round, 78th overall pick
- Drafted by: Phoenix Suns
- Playing career: 1985–1998
- Position: Power forward
- Number: 11

Career history
- 1985–1986: Fórum Filatélico
- 1986: Wildwood Aces
- 1986–1992: Huesca La Magia
- 1992–1994: TDK Manresa
- 1994–1995: Caja San Fernando
- 1995–1996: CB Salamanca
- 1996–1997: TDK Manresa
- 1997–1998: CB Ciudad de Huelva

Career highlights
- 3× AP Honorable mention All-American (1982, 1984, 1985); Atlantic 10 Player of the Year (1985); ECC Co-Player of the Year (1982)
- Stats at Basketball Reference

Granger Errol Hall (born June 18, 1962) is an American retired professional basketball player. A standout college basketball player at Temple University, Hall played for a variety of clubs in Spain's Liga ACB for 13 years and retired as that league's all-time leading rebounder (currently #2 overall).

== Early life and education ==
Hall grew up in Clayton, New Jersey and played for his hometown team at Clayton High School.

=== College career ===
Hall went on to play at Temple University for coach Don Casey in the East Coast Conference. After playing sparingly as a freshman, Hall broke out as a sophomore in 1981–82, averaging 14.9 points and 8.6 rebounds per game and sharing conference player of the year honors with American University's Mark Nickens.

In the offseason, Temple moved to the Atlantic 10 Conference and Casey was replaced by John Chaney. As a junior, Hall averaged 20.6 points and 7.4 rebounds in the first five games of the year. However, he injured his knee in a game against William & Mary, had season-ending surgery, and took a medical redshirt.

After a season of rehabilitation, Hall returned for the 1983–84 season and teamed with future NBA guard Terence Stansbury to lead the Owls to a 26–5 record and an undefeated Atlantic 10 season. Hall averaged 16.9 points and 7.1 rebounds per game during the season. With Stansbury departing, the primary scoring load fell to Hall in his senior season. He averaged 18.0 points and 8.5 rebounds per game. At the season's conclusion, he was named Atlantic 10 Player of the Year, giving Hall the unusual distinction of being named player of the year in two different NCAA Division I conferences; through 2025–26, the only other players to do this are Sedric Webber and Doug McDermott in men's basketball and Alysha Clark in women's basketball).

In addition to his two conference player of the year awards, Hall was a three-time honorable mention All-American, a three time first team All-Conference pick, and a three-time all Philadelphia Big 5 selection. He graduated as Temple's all-time leader in field goal percentage (since eclipsed) and free throw attempts. He was named to the Temple Athletic and Philadelphia Big 5 Halls of Fame.

== Professional career ==
After graduation from Temple, Hall was selected in the fourth round (78th pick overall) of the 1985 NBA draft by the Phoenix Suns. After failing to make the team, Hall signed with Fórum Filatélico of Spain's Liga ACB. He played 13 thirteen years for Huesca La Magia, TDK Manresa, Caja San Fernando, CB Salamanca, and CB Ciudad de Huelva. In 1998, Hall retired with career averages of 18.6 points and 9.9 rebounds per game. He ended his career as the leading rebounder in league history (4,292, since broken) and is also in the top ten all-time in total points (8,039), blocked shots (348), and minutes played (15,395).
