= Nate Blackwell =

American basketball player (born 1965)

Personal information
- Born: February 15, 1965 (age 61) Philadelphia, Pennsylvania, U.S.
- Listed height: 6 ft 4 in (1.93 m)
- Listed weight: 170 lb (77 kg)

Career information
- High school: South Philadelphia (Philadelphia, Pennsylvania)
- College: Temple (1983–1987)
- NBA draft: 1987: 2nd round, 27th overall pick
- Drafted by: San Antonio Spurs
- Playing career: 1987–1987
- Position: Point guard
- Number: 3

Career history

Playing
- 1987: San Antonio Spurs

Coaching
- 1990–1992: Temple (graduate assistant)
- 1992–1996: Coppin State (assistant)
- 1996–2003: Temple (assistant)

Career highlights
- Third-team All-American – UPI (1987); Atlantic 10 Player of the Year (1987); Robert V. Geasey Trophy winner (1987)
- Stats at NBA.com
- Stats at Basketball Reference

Nathaniel Blackwell (born February 15, 1965) is an American former professional basketball player and former coach. He was a 6-foot-4-inch (1.93 m) and 170 pounds (77 kg) point guard who played collegiately for Temple University.

Blackwell averaged 19.8 points per game as a senior at Temple, helping the team finish 32–4. He scored 1,708 points in his career. He was selected by the San Antonio Spurs of the National Basketball Association in the second round (27th pick overall) of the 1987 NBA draft. He played for the Spurs for ten games in 1987–88.

Blackwell served as a graduate assistant coach at Temple from 1990 to 1992. From 1992 to 1996 he was an assistant coach at Coppin State. Blackwell returned to Temple as an assistant in 1996. He resigned on May 2, 2003, for personal reasons. Blackwell had been considered a potential successor to John Chaney, but addiction issues ended his coaching career.

== Career statistics ==
Legend
GP	Games played	GS	Games started	MPG	Minutes per game
FG%	Field goal percentage	3P%	3-point field goal percentage	FT%	Free throw percentage
RPG	Rebounds per game	APG	Assists per game	SPG	Steals per game
BPG	Blocks per game	PPG	Points per game	**Bold**	Career high

=== NBA ===
==== Regular season ====
Year	Team	GP	GS	MPG	FG%	3P%	FT%	RPG	APG	SPG	BPG	PPG
1987–88	San Antonio	10	0	11.2	.366	.182	.833	.6	1.8	.3	.0	3.7
