= West Virginia Mountaineers men's basketball statistical leaders =

The West Virginia Mountaineers men's basketball statistical leaders are individual statistical leaders of the West Virginia Mountaineers men's basketball program in various categories, including points, three-pointers, assists, blocks, rebounds, and steals. Within those areas, the lists identify single-game, single-season, and career leaders. The Mountaineers represent West Virginia University in the NCAA's Big 12 Conference.

West Virginia began competing in intercollegiate basketball in 1903. However, the school's record book does not generally list records from before the 1950s, as records from before this period are often incomplete and inconsistent. Since scoring was much lower in this era, and teams played much fewer games during a typical season, it is likely that few or no players from this era would appear on these lists anyway.

The NCAA did not officially record assists as a stat until the 1983–84 season, and blocks and steals until the 1985–86 season, but West Virginia's record books includes players in these stats before these seasons. These lists are updated through the end of the 2020–21 season.

== Scoring ==
Career
Rk	Player	Points	Seasons
1	Jerry West	2,309	1957–58 1958–59 1959–60
2	Rod Hundley	2,180	1954–55 1955–56 1956–57
3	Da’Sean Butler	2,095	2006–07 2007–08 2008–09 2009–10
4	Wil Robinson	1,850	1969–70 1970–71 1971–72
5	Kevin Jones	1,822	2008–09 2009–10 2010–11 2011–12
6	Greg Jones	1,797	1979–80 1980–81 1981–82 1982–83
7	Rod Thorn	1,785	1960–61 1961–62 1962–63
8	Jevon Carter	1,758	2014–15 2015–16 2016–17 2017–18
9	Kevin Pittsnogle	1,708	2002–03 2003–04 2004–05 2005–06
10	Lowes Moore	1,696	1976–77 1977–78 1978–79 1979–80

Season
Rk	Player	Points	Season
1	Jerry West	908	1959–60
2	Jerry West	903	1958–59
3	Rod Hundley	798	1955–56
4	Rod Hundley	711	1954–55
5	Wil Robinson	706	1971–72
6	Mark Workman	705	1950–51
7	Greg Jones	691	1982–83
8	Rod Thorn	688	1961–62
9	Rod Hundley	671	1956–57
10	Kevin Jones	657	2011–12

Single game
Rk	Player	Points	Season	Opponent
1	Rod Hundley	54	1956–57	Furman
2	Mark Workman	50	1950–51	Salem
3	Mark Workman	48	1950–51	Washington & Jefferson
4	Rod Hundley	47	1954–55	Wake Forest
5	Mark Workman	46	1951–52	VMI
6	Wil Robinson	45	1971–72	Furman
	Wil Robinson	45	1970–71	Penn State
8	Rod Thorn	44	1962–63	St. Joseph's
	Jerry West	44	1958–59	Tennessee
	Mark Workman	44	1950–51	George Washington

== Rebounds ==
Career
Rk	Player	Rebounds	Seasons
1	Jerry West	1,240	1957–58 1958–59 1959–60
2	Lloyd Sharrar	1,178	1955–56 1956–57 1957–58
3	Warren Baker	1,070	1972–73 1973–74 1974–75 1975–76
4	Kevin Jones	1,048	2008–09 2009–10 2010–11 2011–12
5	Willie Bergines	1,025	1953–54 1954–55 1955–56
6	Rod Hundley	941	1954–55 1955–56 1956–57
7	Thomas Lowry	914	1961–62 1962–63 1963–64
8	Rod Thorn	912	1960–61 1961–62 1962–63
9	Maurice Robinson	881	1974–75 1975–76 1976–77 1977–78
10	Damian Owens	868	1994–95 1995–96 1996–97 1997–98

Season
Rk	Player	Rebounds	Season
1	Jerry West	510	1959–60
2	Lloyd Sharrar	443	1956–57
3	Mark Workman	437	1951–52
4	Jerry West	419	1958–59
5	Rod Hundley	392	1955–56
6	Lloyd Sharrar	386	1957–58
7	Pete White	361	1954–55
8	Kevin Jones	360	2011–12
9	Willie Bergines	358	1954–55
10	Rod Thorn	351	1961–62

Single game
Rk	Player	Rebounds	Season	Opponent
1	Jerry West	31	1959–60	George Washington
	Mack Isner	31	1951–52	Virginia Tech
3	Mark Workman	30	1951–52	Richmond
4	Pete White	27	1954–55	Pitt
	Mark Workman	27	1951–52	VMI
	Mack Isner	27	1951–52	Duke
7	Lloyd Sharrar	26	1955–56	William & Mary
	Rod Hundley	26	1955–56	VMI
	Lloyd Sharrar	26	1956–57	Furman

== Assists ==
Career
Rk	Player	Assists	Seasons
1	Steve Berger	574	1986–87 1987–88 1988–89 1989–90
2	Jevon Carter	559	2014–15 2015–16 2016–17 2017–18
3	Marsalis Basey	514	1990–91 1991–92 1992–93 1993–94
4	Ron Williams	504	1965–66 1966–67 1967–68
5	Mike Boyd	471	1990–91 1991–92 1992–93 1993–94
6	Johannes Herber	467	2002–03 2003–04 2004–05 2005–06
7	Juwan Staten	433	2012–13 2013–14 2014–15
8	Greg Jones	430	1979–80 1980–81 1981–82 1982–83
9	Alex Ruoff	410	2005–06 2006–07 2007–08 2008–09
10	J. D. Collins	402	2002–03 2003–04 2004–05 2005–06

Season
Rk	Player	Assists	Season
1	Jevon Carter	246	2017–18
2	Ron Williams	197	1966–67
3	Juwan Staten	193	2013–14
	Steve Berger	193	1988–89
5	Alex Ruoff	191	2006–07
6	Steve Berger	183	1989–90
7	Javon Small	180	2024–25
8	Mike Boyd	175	1990–91
9	Darris Nichols	165	2006–07
10	Ralph Holmes	160	1951–52

Single game
Rk	Player	Assists	Season	Opponent
1	Steve Berger	16	1989–90	Pitt
2	Ron Williams	15	1966–67	Davidson
3	Levi Phillips	13	1973–74	Virginia Tech
	Ricky Ray	13	1963–64	Syracuse
5	Jevon Carter	12	2017–18	Fordham
	Juwan Staten	12	2014–15	TCU
	Tim Lyles	12	2000–01	Syracuse
	Bob Hummell	12	1969–70	Richmond

== Steals ==
Career
Rk	Player	Steals	Seasons
1	Jevon Carter	330	2014–15 2015–16 2016–17 2017–18
2	Greg Jones	251	1979–80 1980–81 1981–82 1982–83
3	Damian Owens	244	1994–95 1995–96 1996–97 1997–98
4	Darryl Prue	230	1985–86 1986–87 1987–88 1988–89
5	Steve Berger	214	1986–87 1987–88 1988–89 1989–90
6	Mike Boyd	205	1990–91 1991–92 1992–93 1993–94
7	Alex Ruoff	189	2005–06 2006–07 2007–08 2008–09
8	Marsalis Basey	182	1990–91 1991–92 1992–93 1993–94
9	Daxter Miles Jr.	177	2014–15 2015–16 2016–17 2017–18
10	Tracy Shelton	159	1988–89 1989–90 1990–91 1991–92 1992–93

Season
Rk	Player	Steals	Season
1	Jevon Carter	112	2017–18
2	Damian Owens	97	1997–98
3	Jevon Carter	92	2016–17
4	Greg Jones	90	1982–83
5	Elton Scott	79	1998–99
6	Jarrod West	77	1997–98
7	Alex Ruoff	72	2006–07
	Greg Jones	72	1980–81
9	Steve Berger	68	1988–89
10	Jevon Carter	67	2014–15
	Darryl Prue	67	1987–88

Single game
Rk	Player	Steals	Season	Opponent
1	Drew Schifino	11	2001–02	Arkansas-Monticello
2	Jevon Carter	9	2017–18	American
	Mike Boyd	9	1990–91	UNC Charlotte
	Darryl Prue	9	1986–87	George Mason
	Ralph Holmes	9	1952–53	South Carolina
6	Elton Scott	8	1998–99	Villanova
	Damian Owens	8	1997–98	Georgia
	Ralph Holmes	8	1952–53	Maryland
	Harry Moore	8	1951–52	Washington & Lee

== Blocks ==
Career
Rk	Player	Blocks	Seasons
1	Sagaba Konate	191	2016–17 2017–18 2018–19
2	D'or Fischer	190	2003–04 2004–05
3	Phil Wilson	178	1990–91 1991–92 1992–93 1993–94
4	Wellington Smith	162	2006–07 2007–08 2008–09 2009–10
5	John Flowers	157	2007–08 2008–09 2009–10 2010–11
	Marcus Goree	157	1996–97 1997–98 1998–99 1999–00
7	Pervires Greene	139	1990–91 1991–92 1992–93 1993–94
8	Tim Kearney	119	1980–81 1981–82 1982–83 1983–84
9	Kevin Jones	109	2008–09 2009–10 2010–11 2011–12
	Kevin Pittsnogle	109	2002–03 2003–04 2004–05 2005–06

Season
Rk	Player	Blocks	Season
1	D'or Fischer	124	2003–04
2	Sagaba Konate	116	2017–18
3	John Flowers	74	2010–11
4	Marcus Goree	70	1999–00
5	D'or Fischer	66	2004–05
6	Wellington Smith	60	2007–08
7	Phil Wilson	58	1992–93
8	Joe Alexander	54	2007–08
	Phil Wilson	54	1993–94
10	Sagaba Konate	53	2016–17
	Wellington Smith	53	2008–09

Single game
Rk	Player	Blocks	Season	Opponent
1	Sagaba Konate	9	2017–18	Baylor
	D'or Fischer	9	2003–04	Rhode Island
3	D'or Fischer	8	2003–04	Boston College
	D'or Fischer	8	2003–04	James Madison
5	Sagaba Konate	7	2017–18	Kentucky
	Sagaba Konate	7	2017–18	Baylor
	John Flowers	7	2010–11	Oakland
	Joe Alexander	7	2007–08	Prairie View A&M
	D'or Fischer	7	2004–05	St. Bonaventure
	D'or Fischer	7	2003–04	IUPUI
	Marcus Goree	7	1999–00	Bowling Green
	Marcus Goree	7	1999–00	Robert Morris
