= Atlantic 10 men's basketball tournament =

American college tournament

- Conference basketball championship
- Sport: College basketball
- Conference: Atlantic 10 Conference
- Number of teams: 14
- Format: Single-elimination tournament
- Current stadium: Rotates; PPG Paints Arena in 2026
- Current location: Rotates; Pittsburgh, PA in 2026
- Played: 1977–present
- Last contest: 2025
- Current champion: VCU
- Most championships: Temple (9)
- TV partner(s): ESPN+, USA Network CBSSN, & CBS

The Atlantic 10 Conference men's basketball tournament is the conference championship tournament in men's basketball for the Atlantic 10 Conference (A-10). The tournament has been held every year since 1977, where it was originally known as the Eastern 8 Conference men's basketball tournament from its inception until 1983. It is a single-elimination tournament, and seeding is based on regular season records. The winner, declared conference champion, receives the conference's automatic bid to the NCAA men's basketball tournament.

== Tournament champions ==
Year	Champion	Score	Runner-up	Most Outstanding Player	Venue	City
1977	Duquesne	57–54	Villanova	Norm Nixon, Duquesne	The Spectrum	Philadelphia, Pennsylvania
1978	Villanova	63–59	West Virginia	Alex Bradley, Villanova	Civic Arena	Pittsburgh, Pennsylvania
1979	Rutgers	61–57	Pittsburgh	James Bailey, Rutgers	Civic Arena	Pittsburgh, Pennsylvania
1980	Villanova	74–62	West Virginia	Lowes Moore, West Virginia	Civic Arena	Pittsburgh, Pennsylvania
1981	Pittsburgh	64–60	Duquesne	Lenny McMillan, Pittsburgh	Civic Arena	Pittsburgh, Pennsylvania
1982	Pittsburgh	78–72	West Virginia	Clyde Vaughan, Pittsburgh	Civic Arena	Pittsburgh, Pennsylvania
1983	West Virginia	86–78	Temple	Terence Stansbury, Temple	The Spectrum	Philadelphia, Pennsylvania
1984	West Virginia	59–56	St. Bonaventure	Lester Rowe, West Virginia	WVU Coliseum	Morgantown, West Virginia
1985	Temple	59–51	Rutgers	Granger Hall, Temple	Rutgers Athletic Center	Piscataway, New Jersey
1986	Saint Joseph's	72-64	West Virginia	Greg Mullee, Saint Joseph's	Brendan Byrne Arena	East Rutherford, New Jersey
1987	Temple	70–57	George Washington	Nate Blackwell, Temple	McGonigle Hall	Philadelphia, Pennsylvania
1988	Temple	68–63	Rhode Island	Tom Garrick, Rhode Island	WVU Coliseum	Morgantown, West Virginia
1989	Rutgers	70–66	Penn State	Tom Savage, Rutgers	Louis Brown Athletic Center	Piscataway, New Jersey
1990	Temple	53–51	Massachusetts	Mark Macon, Temple	McGonigle Hall	Philadelphia, Pennsylvania
1991	Penn State	81–75	George Washington	Freddie Barnes, Penn State	Rec Hall	State College, Pennsylvania
1992	Massachusetts	97–91	West Virginia	Harper Williams, Massachusetts	Curry Hicks Cage	Amherst, Massachusetts
1993	Massachusetts	69–61	Temple	Harper Williams, Massachusetts	Mullins Center	Amherst, Massachusetts
1994	Massachusetts	70–59	Temple	Mike Williams, Massachusetts	Mullins Center	Amherst, Massachusetts
1995	Massachusetts	63–44	Temple	Lou Roe, Massachusetts	Mullins Center	Amherst, Massachusetts
1996	Massachusetts	76–61	Temple	Carmelo Travieso, Massachusetts	Philadelphia Civic Center	Philadelphia, Pennsylvania
1997	Saint Joseph's	61–56	Rhode Island	Rashid Bey, Saint Joseph's	CoreStates Spectrum	Philadelphia, Pennsylvania
1998	Xavier	77–63	George Washington	James Posey, Xavier	CoreStates Spectrum	Philadelphia, Pennsylvania
1999	Rhode Island	62–59	Temple	Lamar Odom, Rhode Island	First Union Spectrum	Philadelphia, Pennsylvania
2000	Temple	65–44	St. Bonaventure	Quincy Wadley, Temple	First Union Spectrum	Philadelphia, Pennsylvania
2001	Temple	76–65	Massachusetts	Lynn Greer, Temple	First Union Spectrum	Philadelphia, Pennsylvania
2002	Xavier	73–60	Richmond	David West, Xavier	First Union Spectrum	Philadelphia, Pennsylvania
2003	Dayton	79–72	Temple	Ramod Marshall, Dayton	University of Dayton Arena	Dayton, Ohio
2004	Xavier	58–49	Dayton	Lionel Chalmers, Xavier	University of Dayton Arena	Dayton, Ohio
2005	George Washington	76–67	Saint Joseph's	Pat Carroll, Saint Joseph's	U.S. Bank Arena	Cincinnati, Ohio
2006	Xavier	62–61	Saint Joseph's	Justin Cage, Xavier	U.S. Bank Arena	Cincinnati, Ohio
2007	George Washington	78–69	Rhode Island	Maureece Rice, George Washington	Boardwalk Hall	Atlantic City, New Jersey
2008	Temple	69–64	Saint Joseph's	Dionte Christmas, Temple	Boardwalk Hall	Atlantic City, New Jersey
2009	Temple	69–64	Duquesne	Dionte Christmas, Temple	Boardwalk Hall	Atlantic City, New Jersey
2010	Temple	56–52	Richmond	Juan Fernández, Temple	Boardwalk Hall	Atlantic City, New Jersey
2011	Richmond	67–54	Dayton	Kevin Anderson, Richmond	Boardwalk Hall	Atlantic City, New Jersey
2012	St. Bonaventure	67–56	Xavier	Andrew Nicholson, St. Bonaventure	Boardwalk Hall	Atlantic City, New Jersey
2013	Saint Louis	62–56	VCU	Dwayne Evans, Saint Louis	Barclays Center	New York City, New York
2014	Saint Joseph's	65–61	VCU	Halil Kanačević, Saint Joseph's	Barclays Center	New York City, New York
2015	VCU	71–65	Dayton	Treveon Graham, VCU	Barclays Center	New York City, New York
2016	Saint Joseph's	87–74	VCU	Isaiah Miles, Saint Joseph's	Barclays Center	New York City, New York
2017	Rhode Island	70–63	VCU	E. C. Matthews, Rhode Island	PPG Paints Arena	Pittsburgh, Pennsylvania
2018	Davidson	58–57	Rhode Island	Peyton Aldridge, Davidson	Capital One Arena	Washington, D.C.
2019	Saint Louis	55–53	St. Bonaventure	Tramaine Isabell, Saint Louis	Barclays Center	New York City, New York
2020	Canceled due to the COVID-19 pandemic					
2021	St. Bonaventure	74–65	VCU	Osun Osunniyi, St. Bonaventure	UD Arena	Dayton, Ohio
2022	Richmond	64–62	Davidson	Jacob Gilyard, Richmond	Capital One Arena	Washington, D.C.
2023	VCU	68–56	Dayton	DaRon Holmes, Dayton	Barclays Center	New York City, New York
2024	Duquesne	57–51	VCU	Dae Dae Grant, Duquesne	Barclays Center	New York City, New York
2025	VCU	68–63	George Mason	Jack Clark, VCU	Capital One Arena	Washington, D.C.
2026	VCU	70–62	Dayton	Terrence Hill Jr., VCU	PPG Paints Arena	Pittsburgh, Pennsylvania

== By school ==
School	Championships	Years
Temple^{†}	9	1985, 1987, 1988, 1990, 2000, 2001, 2008, 2009, 2010
Massachusetts^{†}	5	1992, 1993, 1994, 1995, 1996
Xavier^{†}	4	1998, 2002, 2004, 2006
Saint Joseph's	4	1986, 1997, 2014, 2016
VCU	4	2015, 2023, 2025, 2026
Duquesne	2	1977, 2024
George Washington	2	2005, 2007
Pittsburgh^{†}	2	1981, 1982
Richmond	2	2011, 2022
Rhode Island	2	1999, 2017
Rutgers^{†}	2	1979, 1989
Saint Louis	2	2013, 2019
St. Bonaventure	2	2012, 2021
Villanova^{†}	2	1978, 1980
West Virginia^{†}	2	1983, 1984
Davidson	1	2018
Dayton	1	2003
Penn State^{†}	1	1991
Butler^{†}	0	
Charlotte^{†}	0	
Fordham	0	
George Mason	0	
La Salle	0	
Loyola	0	
Virginia Tech^{†}	0	

- ^{†}Former member of the Atlantic 10

== See also ==
- Atlantic 10 women's basketball tournament
