= Lester Rowe =

American basketball player and coach (born 1963)

Personal information
- Born: January 11, 1963 (age 63) Buffalo, New York, U.S.
- Listed height: 6 ft 5 in (1.96 m)
- Listed weight: 195 lb (88 kg)

Career information
- High school: Lafayette (Buffalo, New York)
- College: West Virginia (1981–1985)
- NBA draft: 1985: undrafted
- Playing career: 1985–1993
- Position: Small forward
- Number: 24
- Coaching career: 1997–present

Career history

Playing
- 1985: Shell Azodrin Bugbusters
- 1987: Long Island Knights
- 1987–1988: Savannah Spirits
- 1988: Youngstown Pride
- 1988: Vancouver Nighthawks

Coaching
- 1997–2002: West Virginia (men's assistant)
- 2011–2019: West Virginia (women's assistant)
- 2019–2020: Northern Kentucky (women's assistant)
- 2020–2023: Xavier (women's assistant)

Career highlights
- 2× Second-team All-Atlantic 10 (1984, 1985); Atlantic 10 All-Freshmen Team (1982); Atlantic 10 tournament MOP (1984)

Lester Rowe (born January 11, 1963) is an American basketball coach and former professional basketball player who last served on the staff of Xavier Musketeers women's basketball. He has played professionally in several leagues. Since retiring as a player, he has worked in business and coached both men's and women's college basketball. As an assistant coach, his teams have earned the 2017 Big 12 women's tournament and 2013–14 Big 12 women's regular-season championships. He has been an assistant coach for both West Virginia men's and West Virginia women's basketball as well as Northern Kentucky women's.

He played four seasons at West Virginia, where he led the team in scoring twice and rebounds three times. His teams either won the Atlantic 10 men's basketball tournament (1983 and 1984) or the Atlantic 10 Conference (known as Eastern Athletic Association until 1982) regular season (1982 and 1985) championship every year that he played. He served as co-captain for two seasons and totaled 1,524 points and 787 rebounds. Rowe once held several West Virginia career records, including career field goal percentage. His school iron man record (114 consecutive starts) stood for over 20 years.

Prior to his time at West Virginia, he played basketball for Lafayette High School, where he was named 1981 Western New York co-player of the year by The Buffalo News. He is the uncle of former professional basketball player Jason Rowe.

== High school ==
Growing up, Rowe played pickup games at the YMCA, the Boys Club and other venues. As a senior at Lafayette, Rowe averaged 28.2 points and 13.0 rebounds. He chose West Virginia over offers from Duke, North Carolina and others. Rowe was named the 1981 Western New York boys' basketball co-player of the year (with Ray Hall) by The Buffalo News. Rowe also competed in the high jump in high school.

== College ==
As a freshman, Rowe led the 1981–82 West Virginia Mountaineers, which was the Eastern Athletic Association (Note: The Eastern Athletic Association (Eastern 8 for short) rebranded as the Atlantic 10 Conference following the 1982 season.) regular season-champion in rebounding (5.5 rpg).

When West Virginia won the 1983 Atlantic 10 men's basketball tournament, Rowe was on the all-tournament team. Rowe was selected along with Terence Stansbury, Mike Brown and Barry Mungar, among others, to a 12-man Atlantic 10 Conference all-star team to tour Spain for a 12-day, 8-game tour to play against Spain, Panama and Soviet Union national teams in Santiago de Compostela, Palma de Mallorca and Madrid from May 12 to 22, 1983. Rowe was the leading scorer on the tour with a 19.9 average.

For the 1983 preseason All-Atlantic 10 first team, Rowe was joined by Tony Costner, Bob Lojewski, Stansbury, and Brown. Rowe was selected as co-captain along with Tim Kearney. After the team lost Greg Jones following the 1982–83 season, Rowe was the leading scorer (15.6 ppg) and rebounder (6.9 rpg) for the 1983–84 team. When West Virginia won the 1984 Atlantic 10 men's basketball tournament, Rowe was the tournament MVP. Rowe was named to the 1984 All-Atlantic 10 second team.

Rowe, who was known for his leaping ability, was joined by Brown, Maurice Martin, John Battle and Granger Hall on the 1984 preseason All-Atlantic 10 first team. Rowe was selected as co-captain along with Dale Blaney. On January 5, 1985, Rowe dunked what seemed to be a timely game-winning basket against the Saint Joseph's Hawks. However, after both teams returned to their locker rooms, warmups had begun for the next game of the doubleheader and the referees returned to their locker room, they decided that the dunk came after the buzzer. By some accounts, seven minutes after the game, West Virginia had already left the Palestra to catch a plane. However, Atlantic 10 basketball commissioner Charlie Theokas restored West Virginia's victory two days later, noting that "[w]hen the referees signaled Rowe's field goal was good, and subsequently left the floor, the game was over." Rowe again led the team in scoring (14.4 ppg) and rebounding (7.0 rpg) and earned second-team All-Atlantic 10. West Virginia won the Atlantic 10 regular season-championship.

Following his career, Rowe held the West Virginia career field goal percentage (593/1,095, 54.2%) record for four seasons and the career games started record (114) for six seasons. He also held less auspicious career records for turnovers and fouls. Rowe's record for consecutive starts (114) lasted until 2006 (Johannes Herber). Rowe was a four-time conference player of the week. Rowe is remembered for his dunking ability and his 42-inch (110 cm) vertical jump. He described his greatest memory as the February 27, 1983, upset of number-one-ranked UNLV. It would be almost 33 years before West Virginia defeated another number-one-ranked team.

== Professional career ==
=== Player ===
In 1985, Rowe joined the Shell Azodrin Bugbusters of the Philippine Basketball Association; he played in the PBA again in 1986. Rowe was teammates with Nancy Lieberman on the Long Island Knights of the United States Basketball League in 1987. Rowe played with the Savannah Spirits early in the 1987–88 season before being waived in late November. On December 8, 1987, the International Basketball Association conducted its draft with Lester Rowe being selected in the first round with the fourth pick by Ohio. When four of the ten IBA teams wanted to delay commencement of the league until 1989, the other six formed the World Basketball League (WBL) for players listed at 6 ft 4 in (1.93 m) or less. On April 15, 1988, he signed with the Youngstown Pride of the WBL, where he was teammates with his former Co-Player of the Year Hall. In July, Rowe, who was listed as a center in this league for short players, was traded to the Vancouver Nighthawks. He also played in Argentina, France, Germany, and Venezuela.

Rowe was inducted into the West Virginia University Sports Hall of Fame in 2014.

=== Coach ===
Rowe was hired as an assistant coach for Gale Catlett and West Virginia Mountaineers men's basketball in September 1997. He performed coaching, recruiting, scouting and administrative duties. He served on the staff for five seasons, highlighted by a Sweet Sixteen run by the 1997–98 team in the 1998 NCAA Division I men's basketball tournament. With five games remaining for West Virginia in the 2001–02 NCAA Division I men's basketball season, Catlett resigned during his 24th season as head coach. At first, Dan Dakich was announced as Catlett's replacement after Bob Huggins rejected the job. Eventually, incoming head coach John Beilein brought all three of his assistants from Richmond to fill out his staff.

Rowe had coaching offers but did not want to move from Morgantown, West Virginia, at that stage of his life. From 2002 to 2010, Rowe served as a commercial property manager and sales executive. Rowe became an assistant coach for Mike Carey and West Virginia Mountaineers women's basketball in 2011. He was reprimanded by Big 12 commissioner Bob Bowlsby for his involvement in a post-game melee at the Bank of Hawaii Rainbow Wahine Classic at the Stan Sheriff Center on November 17, 2013. His tenure lasted until 2019, with the team earning both a regular season Big 12 Conference championship (2014) and a Big 12 Conference Tournament championship (2017) with Rowe. In July 2019, Rowe was hired by the Northern Kentucky Norse women's basketball team. On July 1, 2020, Rowe joined the Xavier Musketeers women's basketball staff under head coach Melanie Moore. Moore and her staff were fired following the 2022–23 season.

== Personal ==
Rowe has two daughters, Monalisa (born 1991/92) and Monique (born 1993/94). Mona was an all-state basketball player as a junior, but she suffered an anterior cruciate ligament injury in her 2008–09 senior season. Rowe met his wife, Lisa, in Morgantown.
