= List of West Virginia Mountaineers men's basketball seasons =

This is a list of seasons completed by the West Virginia Mountaineers men's college basketball team.

== Seasons ==
Season	Coach	Overall	Conference	Standing	Postseason	Coaches' poll	AP poll
John A. Purinton (Independent) (1904–1904)
1903–04	John A. Purinton	4–3					
John A. Purinton:		4–3					
Anthony Chez (Independent) (1904–1907)
1904–05	Anthony Chez	6–9					
1905–06	Anthony Chez	5–4					
1906–07	Anthony Chez	4–8					
Anthony Chez:		15–21					
James Jenkins (Independent) (1908–1908)
1907–08	James Jenkins	3–7					
James Jenkins:		3–7					
George Pyle (Independent) (1914–1917)
1914–15	George Pyle	10–10					
1915–16	George Pyle	11–7					
1916–17	George Pyle	8–8					
George Pyle:		29–25					
H.P. Mullenex (Independent) (1917–1919)
1917–18	H.P. Mullenex	4–13					
1918–19	H.P. Mullenex	8–8					
H.P. Mullenex:		12–21					
Francis Stadsvold (Independent) (1919–1932)
1919–20	Francis Stadsvold	12–10					
1920–21	Francis Stadsvold	11–9					
1921–22	Francis Stadsvold	8–13					
1922–23	Francis Stadsvold	12–7					
1923–24	Francis Stadsvold	14–2					
1924–25	Francis Stadsvold	6–11					
1925–26	Francis Stadsvold	10–11					
1926–27	Francis Stadsvold	10–8					
1927–28	Francis Stadsvold	13–7					
1928–29	Francis Stadsvold	16–6					
1929–30	Francis Stadsvold	11–10					
1930–31	Francis Stadsvold	9–11					
1931–32	Francis Stadsvold	7–14					
Francis Stadsvold (Eastern Intercollegiate Conference) (1932–1933)
1932–33	Francis Stadsvold	10–14	1–7	5th			
Francis Stadsvold:		149–133	1–7				
Marshall Glenn (Eastern Intercollegiate Conference) (1933–1938)
1933–34	Marshall Glenn	14–5	7–3	2nd			
1934–35	Marshall Glenn	16–6	6–3^{[Note A]}	2nd^{[Note A]}			
1935–36	Marshall Glenn	16–8	6–4	T–3rd			
1936–37	Marshall Glenn	9–14	3–7	T–5th			
1937–38	Marshall Glenn	6–13	2–8	6th			
Marshall Glenn:		61–46	24–25				
Dyke Raese (Eastern Intercollegiate Conference) (1938–1939)
1938–39	Dyke Raese	10–9	4–6	T–5th			
Dyke Raese (Independent) (1939–1942)
1939–40	Dyke Raese	13–6					
1940–41	Dyke Raese	13–10					
1941–42	Dyke Raese	19–4			NIT Champion		
Dyke Raese:		55–29	4–6				
Rudy Baric (Independent) (1942–1943)
1942–43	Rudy Baric	14–7					
Rudy Baric:		14–7					
Henry Lothes (Independent) (1943–1944)
1943–44	Harry Lothes	8–11					
Henry Lothes:		8–11					
John Brickels (Independent) (1944–1945)
1944–45	John Brickels	12–6			NIT Quarterfinal		
John Brickels:		12–6					
Red Brown (Independent) (1945–1950)
1945–46	Lee Patton	24–3			NIT Third Place		
1946–47	Lee Patton	19–3			NIT Fourth Place		
1947–48	Lee Patton	17–3					
1948–49	Lee Patton	18–6					
1949–50	Lee Patton	13–11					
Lee Patton:		91–26					
Red Brown (Southern Conference) (1950–1954)
1950–51	Red Brown	18–9	9–3	2nd			
1951–52	Red Brown	23–4	15–1	1st		9	14
1952–53	Red Brown	19–7	11–3	4th			
1953–54	Red Brown	12–11	6–4	4th			
Red Brown:		72–31	41–11				
Fred Schaus (Southern Conference) (1954–1960)
1954–55	Fred Schaus	19–11	9–1	1st	NCAA First Round	19	
1955–56	Fred Schaus	21–9	10–2	T–1st	NCAA First Round	20	
1956–57	Fred Schaus	25–5	12–0	1st	NCAA University Division First Round	7	11
1957–58	Fred Schaus	26–2	12–0	1st	NCAA University Division First Round	1	1
1958–59	Fred Schaus	29–5	11–0	1st	NCAA University Division Runner–up	10	11
1959–60	Fred Schaus	26–5	9–2	2nd	NCAA University Division Sweet Sixteen	5	6
Fred Schaus:		146–37	63–5				
George King (Southern Conference) (1960–1965)
1960–61	George King	23–4	11–1	1st		9	12
1961–62	George King	24–6	12–1	1st	NCAA University Division First Round		16
1962–63	George King	23–8	11–2	1st	NCAA University Division Sweet Sixteen		16
1963–64	George King	18–10	11–3	2nd			
1964–65	George King	14–15	8–6	4th	NCAA University Division First Round		
George King:		102–43	53–13				
Bucky Waters (Southern Conference) (1965–1968)
1965–66	Bucky Waters	19–9	8–2	2nd			
1966–67	Bucky Waters	19–9	9–1	1st	NCAA University Division First Round		
1967–68	Bucky Waters	19–9	9–2	2nd	NIT First Round		
Bucky Waters (Independent) (1968–1969)
1968–69	Bucky Waters	12–14					
Bucky Waters:		69–41	26–5				
Sonny Moran (Independent) (1969–1974)
1969–70	Sonny Moran	11–15					
1970–71	Sonny Moran	13–12					
1971–72	Sonny Moran	13–11					
1972–73	Sonny Moran	10–15					
1973–74	Sonny Moran	10–15					
Sonny Moran:		57–68					
Joedy Gardner (Independent) (1974–1976)
1974–75	Joedy Gardner	14–13					
1975–76	Joedy Gardner	15–13					
Joedy Gardner (Atlantic 10 Conference) (1976–1978)
1976–77	Joedy Gardner	18–11	5–5	T–1st (ECBL West)			
1977–78	Joedy Gardner	12–16	3–7	8th (Eastern 8)			
Joedy Gardner:		59–53	8–12				
Gale Catlett (Atlantic 10 Conference) (1978–1995)
1978–79	Gale Catlett	16–12	7–3	2nd (Eastern 8)			
1979–80	Gale Catlett	15–14	4–6	7th (Eastern 8)			
1980–81	Gale Catlett	23–10	9–4	3rd (Eastern 8)			
1981–82	Gale Catlett	27–4	13–1	1st (Eastern 8)	NCAA Division I Second Round	14	17
1982–83	Gale Catlett	23–8	10–4	T–1st (A10 West)	NCAA Division I First Round		
1983–84	Gale Catlett	20–12	9–9	T–4th	NCAA Division I Second Round		
1984–85	Gale Catlett	20–9	16–2	1st	NIT First Round		
1985–86	Gale Catlett	22–11	15–3	2nd	NCAA Division I First Round		
1986–87	Gale Catlett	23–8	15–3	2nd	NCAA Division I First Round		
1987–88	Gale Catlett	18–14	12–6	3rd	NIT First Round		
1988–89	Gale Catlett	26–5	17–1	1st	NCAA Division I Second Round	17	19
1989–90	Gale Catlett	16–12	11–7	T–3rd			
1990–91	Gale Catlett	17–14	10–8	T–3rd	NIT Second Round		
1991–92	Gale Catlett	20–12	10–6	3rd	NCAA Division I First Round		
1992–93	Gale Catlett	17–12	7–7	6th	NIT Second Round		
1993–94	Gale Catlett	17–12	8–8	3rd	NIT Second Round		
1994–95	Gale Catlett	13–13	7–9	T–6th			
Gale Catlett (Big East Conference) (1995–2002)
1995–96	Gale Catlett	12–15	7–11	4th (BE 6)			
1996–97	Gale Catlett	21–10	11–7	3rd (BE 6)	NIT Quarterfinal		
1997–98	Gale Catlett	24–9	11–7	3rd (BE 6)	NCAA Division I Sweet Sixteen		18
1998–99	Gale Catlett	10–19	4–14	12th			
1999–2000	Gale Catlett	14–14	6–10	8th			
2000–01	Gale Catlett	17–12	8–8	4th	NIT First Round		
2001–02	Gale Catlett	8–20	1–15	7th			
Gale Catlett:		439–276	228–159				
John Beilein (Big East Conference) (2002–2007)
2002–03	John Beilein	14–15	5–11	6th			
2003–04	John Beilein	17–14	7–9	T–8th	NIT Quarterfinal		
2004–05	John Beilein	24–11	8–8	T–7th	NCAA Division I Elite Eight	12	
2005–06	John Beilein	22–11	11–5	3rd	NCAA Division I Sweet Sixteen	15	22
2006–07	John Beilein	27–9	9–7	7th	NIT Champion		
John Beilein:		104–60	40–40				
Bob Huggins (Big East Conference) (2007–2012)
2007–08	Bob Huggins	26–11	11–7	5th	NCAA Division I Sweet Sixteen	17	
2008–09	Bob Huggins	23–12	10–8	7th	NCAA Division I First Round		
2009–10	Bob Huggins	31–7	13–5	3rd	NCAA Division I Final Four	3	6
2010–11	Bob Huggins	21–12	11–7	6th	NCAA Division I Second Round		22
2011–12	Bob Huggins	19–14	9–9	8th	NCAA Division I First Round		
Bob Huggins (Big 12 Conference) (2012–2023)
2012–13	Bob Huggins	13–19	6–12	8th			
2013–14	Bob Huggins	17–16	9–9	T–6th	NIT First Round		
2014–15	Bob Huggins	25–10	11–7	T–4th	NCAA Division I Sweet Sixteen	18	20
2015–16	Bob Huggins	26–9	13–5	2nd	NCAA Division I Second Round	14	8
2016–17	Bob Huggins	28–9	12–6	T–2nd	NCAA Division I Sweet Sixteen	13	11
2017–18	Bob Huggins	26–11	11–7	T–2nd	NCAA Division I Sweet Sixteen	15	13
2018–19	Bob Huggins	15–21	4–14	10th	CBI Quarterfinal		
2019–20	Bob Huggins	21–10	9–9	T–3rd	No postseason held	24	24
2020–21	Bob Huggins	19–10	11–6	T–3rd	NCAA Division I Second Round	13	13
2021–22	Bob Huggins	16–17	4–14	10th			
2022–23	Bob Huggins	19–15	7–11	8th	NCAA Division I Round of 64		
Bob Huggins:		345–203	150–135				
Josh Eilert (Interim) (Big 12 Conference) (2023–2024)
2023–24	Josh Eilert	9–23	4–14	T–13th			
Josh Eilert:		9–23	4–14				
Darian DeVries (Big 12 Conference) (2024–2025)
2024–25	Darian DeVries	19–13	10–10	T–7th			
Darian DeVries:		19–13	10–10				
Ross Hodge (Big 12 Conference) (2025–present)
2025–26	Ross Hodge	21–14	9–9	T–7th	College Basketball Crown Champions		
Ross Hodge:		21–14	9–9				
Total:		1,895–1,201					
National champion Postseason invitational champion Conference regular season champion Conference regular season and conference tournament champion Division regular season champion Division regular season and conference tournament champion Conference tournament champion

^A. In the 1934–35 season, West Virginia finished the Eastern Intercollegiate Conference season with a record of 6–2, tied for first place with Pittsburgh. The conference win–loss record for 1934–35 includes West Virginia′s subsequent loss to Pittsburgh in a conference championship playoff game, giving West Virginia a second-place finish for the season.
