= 1983–84 Temple Owls men's basketball team =

American college basketball season

1983–84 Temple Owls men's basketball

A–10 Regular Season Champions

NCAA tournament, Second Round
- Conference: Atlantic 10 Conference

Ranking
- AP: No. 20
- Record: 26–5 (18–0 A–10)
- Head coach: John Chaney (2nd season)
- Home arena: McGonigle Hall

1983–84 Atlantic 10 men's basketball standings
	Conf.				Overall
Team	W		L	PCT	W		L	PCT
No. 20 Temple	18	–	0	1.000	26	–	5	.839
Saint Joseph's	13	–	5	.722	20	–	9	.690
George Washington	11	–	7	.611	17	–	12	.586
West Virginia †	9	–	9	.500	20	–	12	.625
Rutgers	9	–	9	.500	15	–	13	.536
St. Bonaventure	8	–	10	.444	18	–	13	.581
Duquesne	8	–	10	.444	10	–	18	.357
UMass	6	–	12	.333	12	–	17	.414
Rhode Island	5	–	13	.278	6	–	22	.214
Penn State	3	–	15	.167	5	–	22	.185
† 1984 Atlantic 10 Tournament winner Rankings from AP Poll

The 1983–84 Temple Owls men's basketball team represented Temple University as a member of the Atlantic 10 Conference during the 1983–84 NCAA Division I men's basketball season.

== Roster ==
1983–84 Temple Owls men's basketball team
Players
Coaches

Pos.	#	Name	Height	Weight	Year	Previous school	Hometown
G	3	Nate Blackwell	6 ft 4 in (1.93 m)	165 lb (75 kg)	Fr	South Philadelphia HS	Philadelphia, PA
F	30	Granger Hall	6 ft 8 in (2.03 m)	200 lb (91 kg)	Jr	Clayton HS	Clayton, NJ
F	43	Terence Stansbury	6 ft 5 in (1.96 m)	170 lb (77 kg)	Sr	Newark HS	Newark, DE

Head coach

- John Chaney

Assistant coach(es)

Legend

- (C) Team captain
- (S) Suspended
- (I) Ineligible
- (W) Walk-on
- Injured
- Current redshirt

Roster

== Schedule ==
Date time, TV	Rank^{#}	Opponent^{#}	Result	Record	Site city, state
Regular season
Nov 28, 1983*		at Drexel	W 61–60	1–0	Daskalakis Athletic Center (2,500); Philadelphia, Pennsylvania
Dec 7, 1983*		at Bowling Green	W 79–70	2–0	Anderson Arena; Bowling Green, Ohio
Dec 10, 1983*		vs. Villanova	W 92–89	3–0	Palestra; Philadelphia, Pennsylvania
Mar 3, 1984		at Saint Joseph's	W 69–58	24–3 (18–0)	Hagan Arena; Philadelphia, Pennsylvania
Atlantic 10 Tournament
Mar 8, 1984*		vs. UMass	W 78–54	25–3	WVU Coliseum; Morgantown, West Virginia
Mar 9, 1984*		at West Virginia	L 65–67	25–4	WVU Coliseum; Morgantown, West Virginia
NCAA Tournament
Mar 15, 1984*	(8 E) No. 20	vs. (9 E) St. John's; First round	W 65–63	26–4	Charlotte Coliseum; Charlotte, North Carolina
Mar 17, 1984*	(8 E) No. 20	vs. (1 E) No. 1 North Carolina; Second round	L 66–77	26–5	Charlotte Coliseum; Charlotte, North Carolina
*Non-conference game. ^{#}Rankings from AP Poll. (#) Tournament seedings in parentheses. E=East. All times are in Eastern Standard Time.

== NBA draft ==
Round	Pick	Player	NBA club
1	15	Terence Stansbury	Dallas Mavericks
