= 1976 Metro Conference men's basketball tournament =

1976 Metro Conference

- Classification: Division I
- Season: 1975–76
- Teams: 6
- Site: Freedom Hall; Louisville, KY
- Champions: Cincinnati (1st title)
- Winning coach: Gale Catlett (1st title)
- MVP: Dexter Reed (Memphis State)

1975–76 Metro Conference men's basketball standings
	Conf.				Overall
Team	W		L	PCT	W		L	PCT
Tulane	1	–	0	1.000	18	–	9	.667
No. 12 Cincinnati †	2	–	1	.667	25	–	6	.806
Louisville	2	–	1	.667	20	–	8	.714
Memphis State	1	–	1	.500	21	–	9	.700
Georgia Tech	0	–	1	.000	13	–	14	.481
Saint Louis	0	–	2	.000	13	–	14	.481
† 1976 Metro Conference tournament winner Rankings from AP Poll

The 1976 Metro Conference men's basketball tournament was held March 4–6 at Freedom Hall in Louisville, Kentucky. This was the first edition of the tournament.

Cincinnati defeated Memphis State in the championship game, 103–95, to win their first Metro men's basketball tournament.

The Bearcats, in turn, received a bid to the 1976 NCAA Tournament. They were joined by fellow Metro member, and tournament runner-up, Memphis State, who earned an at-large bid.

== Format ==
All six of the conference's members participated in the tournament field. They were seeded based on regular season conference records, with the top two teams earning byes into the semifinal round. The other four teams entered into the preliminary first round.

== Bracket ==
First round Thursday March 4
5	Tulane	68
4	Georgia Tech	74
3	Memphis State	73
6	Saint Louis	69

Semifinals; Friday, March 5
1	Cincinnati	71
4	Georgia Tech	60
3	Memphis State	87
2	Louisville	76

Championship; Saturday, March 6
1	Cincinnati	103
3	Memphis State	95
