= 1991–92 UMass Minutemen basketball team =

American college basketball season

1991–92 UMass Minutemen basketball
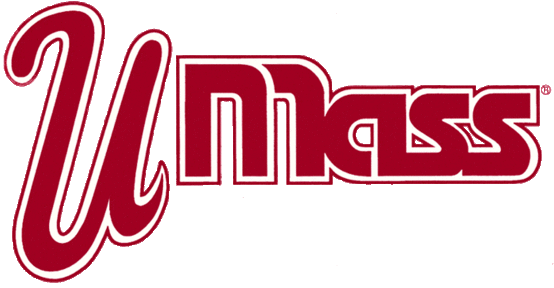

Atlantic 10 regular season champions Atlantic 10 tournament champions Great Alaska Shootout champions

NCAA tournament, Sweet Sixteen
- Conference: Atlantic 10 Conference

Ranking
- Coaches: No. 21
- AP: No. 17
- Record: 30–5 (13–3 A-10)
- Head coach: John Calipari (4th season)
- Assistant coaches: Bruiser Flint; John Robic
- Home arena: Curry Hicks Cage

1991–92 Atlantic 10 men's basketball standings
	Conf.				Overall
Team	W		L	PCT	W		L	PCT
No. 17 UMass †	13	–	3	.813	30	–	5	.857
Temple	11	–	5	.688	17	–	13	.567
West Virginia	10	–	6	.625	20	–	12	.625
Rhode Island	9	–	7	.563	22	–	10	.688
George Washington	8	–	8	.500	16	–	12	.571
Rutgers	6	–	10	.375	16	–	15	.516
Duquesne	6	–	10	.375	13	–	15	.464
Saint Joseph's	6	–	10	.375	13	–	15	.464
St. Bonaventure	3	–	13	.188	9	–	19	.321
† 1992 Atlantic 10 Tournament winner Rankings from AP Poll

The 1991–92 UMass Minutemen basketball team represented the University of Massachusetts Amherst during the 1991–92 NCAA Division I men's basketball season. The Minutemen, led by fourth year head coach John Calipari, played their home games at Curry Hicks Cage and were members of the Atlantic 10 Conference. They finished the season 30–5, 13–3 in A-10 play to finish in first place. The Minutemen won the A-10 Conference tournament by beating West Virginia in the finals. They were awarded a #3 seed in the NCAA tournament. The Minutemen advanced to the Sweet Sixteen, losing to #2 seed Kentucky in the East Regional semifinal.

== Roster ==
1991–92 UMass Minutemen men's basketball team
Players
Coaches

Pos.	#	Name	Height	Weight	Year	Hometown
G	11	Anton Brown	6 ft 2 in (1.88 m)	175 lb (79 kg)	Sr	Columbia, South Carolina
G	14	Derek Kellogg	6 ft 3 in (1.91 m)	185 lb (84 kg)	So	Springfield, Massachusetts
F	15	Lou Roe	6 ft 7 in (2.01 m)	210 lb (95 kg)	Fr	Atlantic City, New Jersey
G	20	Jim McCoy	6 ft 4 in (1.93 m)	185 lb (84 kg)	Sr	Pittsburgh, Pennsylvania
G/F	22	Tony Barbee	6 ft 6 in (1.98 m)	210 lb (95 kg)	Jr	Indianapolis, Indiana
F	31	Harper Williams	6 ft 7 in (2.01 m)	215 lb (98 kg)	Jr	Bridgeport, Connecticut
F	34	William Herndon	6 ft 3 in (1.91 m)	220 lb (100 kg)	Sr	Pittsburgh, Pennsylvania

Head coach

- John Calipari (Clarion)

Assistant coach(es)

- Bruiser Flint (Saint Joseph's)
- John Robic (Denison)

Legend

- (C) Team captain
- (S) Suspended
- (I) Ineligible
- (W) Walk-on
- Injured
- Current redshirt

== Schedule ==
Date time, TV	Rank^{#}	Opponent^{#}	Result	Record	Site (attendance) city, state
Regular season
Nov 22, 1991*		Siena	W 94–59	1–0	Curry Hicks Cage; Amherst, MA
Nov 25, 1991*		Keene State	W 94–45	2–0	Curry Hicks Cage; Amherst, MA
Nov 29, 1991*		vs. Santa Clara; Great Alaska Shootout	W 85–64	3–0	Sullivan Arena; Anchorage, AK
Nov 30, 1991*		vs. Oregon State; Great Alaska Shootout	W 74–65	4–0	Sullivan Arena; Anchorage, AK
Dec 2, 1991*		vs. New Orleans; Great Alaska Shootout	W 68–56	5–0	Sullivan Arena; Anchorage, AK
Dec 4, 1991*		at No. 14 Kentucky	L 69–90	5–1	Rupp Arena; Lexington, KY
Dec 7, 1991*		Xavier	W 91–72	6–1	Curry Hicks Cage; Amherst, MA
Dec 10, 1991*		New Hampshire	W 84–63	7–1	Curry Hicks Cage; Amherst, MA
Dec 12, 1991*		at Holy Cross	W 85–73	8–1	Hart Center; Worcester, MA
Dec 14, 1991*		at George Washington	L 65–77	8–2 (0–1)	Charles E. Smith Center; Washington, D.C.
Dec 27, 1991*		vs. Harvard; Hall of Fame Classic	W 98–63	9–2	Springfield Civic Center; Springfield, MA
Dec 28, 1991*		vs. Iowa State; Hall of Fame Classic	W 73–53	10–2	Springfield Civic Center; Springfield, MA
Jan 4, 1992*		vs. No. 14 Oklahoma	W 86–73	11–2	Springfield Civic Center (8,469); Springfield, MA
Jan 8, 1992	No. 25	West Virginia	L 75–76	11–3 (0–2)	Curry Hicks Cage; Amherst, MA
Jan 13, 1992*		at Boston University	W 84–82	12–3	Case Gym; Boston, MA
Jan 15, 1992		George Washington	W 88–80	13–3 (1–2)	Curry Hicks Cage; Amherst, MA
Jan 20, 1992		at Rhode Island	W 72–59	14–3 (2–2)	Keaney Gymnasium; Kingston, RI
Jan 23, 1992		at Saint Joseph's	W 91–66	15–3 (3–2)	Hagan Arena; Pennsylvania, PA
Jan 25, 1992		Duquesne	W 87–68	16–3 (4–2)	Curry Hicks Cage; Amherst, MA
Jan 28, 1992		at Temple	L 61–83	16–4 (4–3)	McGonigle Hall; Philadelphia, PA
Jan 30, 1992		Rutgers	W 77–66	17–4 (5–3)	Curry Hicks Cage; Amherst, MA
Feb 4, 1992		at St. Bonaventure	W 76–58	18–4 (6–3)	Reilly Center; Buffalo, NY
Feb 8, 1992		Saint Joseph's	W 81–73	19–4 (7–3)	Curry Hicks Cage; Amherst, MA
Feb 16, 1992		Temple	W 67–52	20–4 (8–3)	Curry Hicks Cage; Amherst, MA
Feb 18, 1992		at Rutgers	W 81–67	21–4 (9–3)	Louis Brown Athletic Center; Piscataway, NJ
Feb 22, 1992		St. Bonaventure	W 104–67	22–4 (10–3)	Curry Hicks Cage; Amherst, MA
Feb 27, 1992		at West Virginia	W 74–69 ^{OT}	23–4 (11–3)	WVU Coliseum; Morgantown, WV
Mar 1, 1992		at Duquesne	W 82–61	24–4 (12–3)	A.J. Palumbo Center; Pittsburgh, PA
Mar 4, 1992	No. 25	Rhode Island	W 96–88	25–4 (13–3)	Curry Hicks Cage; Amherst, MA
Atlantic 10 tournament
Mar 8, 1992*	No. 25	vs. Rutgers; A-10 Tournament Quarterfinal	W 106–94	26–4	The Palestra; Philadelphia, PA
Mar 9, 1992*	No. 22	vs. Rhode Island; A-10 Tournament Semifinal	W 78–67	27–4	The Palestra; Philadelphia, PA
Mar 12, 1992*	No. 22	West Virginia; A-10 tournament championship	W 97–91	28–4	Curry Hicks Cage; Amherst, MA
NCAA tournament
Mar 20, 1992*	(3 E) No. 17	vs. (14 E) Fordham; First round	W 85–58	29–4	Centrum in Worcester; Worcester, MA
Mar 22, 1992*	(3 E) No. 17	vs. (6 E) No. 21 Syracuse; Second Round	W 77–71 ^{OT}	30–4	Centrum in Worcester; Worcester, MA
Mar 26, 1992*	(3 E) No. 17	vs. (2 E) No. 6 Kentucky; East Regional semifinal	L 77–87	30–5	The Spectrum; Philadelphia, PA
*Non-conference game. ^{#}Rankings from AP Poll. (#) Tournament seedings in parentheses. E=East Region. All times are in Eastern Time.
