= 1991–92 Temple Owls men's basketball team =

American college basketball season

1991–92 Temple Owls men's basketball

NCAA tournament
- Conference: Atlantic 10 Conference
- Record: 17–13 (11–5 A–10)
- Head coach: John Chaney (10th season)
- Home arena: McGonigle Hall (Capacity: 4,500)

1991–92 Atlantic 10 men's basketball standings
	Conf.				Overall
Team	W		L	PCT	W		L	PCT
No. 17 UMass †	13	–	3	.813	30	–	5	.857
Temple	11	–	5	.688	17	–	13	.567
West Virginia	10	–	6	.625	20	–	12	.625
Rhode Island	9	–	7	.563	22	–	10	.688
George Washington	8	–	8	.500	16	–	12	.571
Rutgers	6	–	10	.375	16	–	15	.516
Duquesne	6	–	10	.375	13	–	15	.464
Saint Joseph's	6	–	10	.375	13	–	15	.464
St. Bonaventure	3	–	13	.188	9	–	19	.321
† 1992 Atlantic 10 Tournament winner Rankings from AP Poll

The 1991–92 Temple Owls men's basketball team represented Temple University as a member of the Atlantic 10 Conference during the 1991–92 NCAA Division I men's basketball season. The team was led by head coach John Chaney and played their home games at McGonigle Hall. The Owls received an at-large bid to the NCAA tournament as the No. 11 seed in the Southeast region. Temple lost in the opening round to the Fab Five of Michigan, 73–66. The team finished with a record of 17–13 (11–5 A-10).

== Roster ==
1991–92 Temple Owls men's basketball team
Players
Coaches

Pos.	#	Name	Height	Weight	Year	Previous school	Hometown
PG	4	Rick Brunson	6 ft 4 in (1.93 m)	180 lb (82 kg)	Fr	Salem HS	Salem, MA
G/F	21	Eddie Jones	6 ft 6 in (1.98 m)	190 lb (86 kg)	Fr	Blanche Ely HS	Pompano Beach, FL
G/F	23	Aaron McKie	6 ft 5 in (1.96 m)	200 lb (91 kg)	So	Simon Gratz HS	Philadelphia, PA
F	24	Mik Kilgore	6 ft 8 in (2.03 m)	210 lb (95 kg)	Sr	West Philadelphia HS	Philadelphia, PA
F	30	Mark Strickland	6 ft 9 in (2.06 m)	205 lb (93 kg)	Jr	McNair HS	Atlanta, GA

Head coach

- John Chaney

Assistant coach(es)

Legend

- (C) Team captain
- (S) Suspended
- (I) Ineligible
- (W) Walk-on
- Injured
- Current redshirt

Roster

== Schedule ==
Date time, TV	Rank^{#}	Opponent^{#}	Result	Record	Site city, state
Regular Season
Dec 3, 1991*		at Penn	W 69–65	1–0	The Palestra; Philadelphia, Pennsylvania
Dec 7, 1991*		Duquesne	W 94–78	2–0	McGonigle Hall; Philadelphia, Pennsylvania
Dec 10, 1991*		Illinois	W 92–56	3–0	McGonigle Hall; Philadelphia, Pennsylvania
Dec 27, 1991*		vs. Kansas State	W 68–65	4–0	Kemper Arena; Kansas City, Missouri
Dec 28, 1991*		vs. No. 4 Kansas	L 73–97	4–1	Kemper Arena; Kansas City, Missouri
Jan 25, 1992*		at No. 21 Tulane	L 75–99	7–7	Devlin Fieldhouse; New Orleans, Louisiana
Feb 9, 1992*		vs. Penn State	W 73–72 ^{2OT}	12–8	
Feb 13, 1992*		at Memphis State	W 65–63	13–8	The Pyramid; Memphis, Tennessee
Feb 23, 1992*		vs. No. 5 Arizona; 7-Up Shootout	L 60–66	14–10	St. Petersburg, Florida
Mar 1, 1992*		at Wake Forest	L 75–83	15–11	Lawrence Joel Coliseum; Winston-Salem, North Carolina
Atlantic 10 Tournament
Mar 8, 1992*		vs. Saint Joseph's; Quarterfinals	W 75–59	17–11	The Palestra; Philadelphia, Pennsylvania
Mar 9, 1992*		vs. West Virginia; Semifinals	L 41–44	17–12	The Palestra; Philadelphia, Pennsylvania
NCAA Tournament
Mar 20, 1992*	(11 SE)	vs. (6 SE) No. 15 Michigan; First Round	L 66–73	17–13	The Omni; Atlanta, Georgia
*Non-conference game. ^{#}Rankings from AP Poll. (#) Tournament seedings in parentheses. SE=Southeast. All times are in Eastern Standard Time.
