= Gale Catlett =

American basketball coach

Biographical details
- Born: October 31, 1940 (age 85); Hedgesville, West Virginia, U.S.

Playing career
- 1960–1963: West Virginia
- Position: Forward

Coaching career (HC unless noted)
- 1963–1965: Richmond (assistant)
- 1965–1967: Davidson (assistant)
- 1967–1971: Kansas (assistant)
- 1971–1972: Kentucky (assistant)
- 1972–1978: Cincinnati
- 1978–2002: West Virginia

Head coaching record
- Overall: 565–325
- Tournaments: 7–11 (NCAA Division I); 8–8 (NIT)

Accomplishments and honors

Championships
- 2 Metro tournament (1976, 1977); 3 EAA/A-10 regular season (1982, 1985, 1989); 2 EAA/A-10 tournament (1983, 1984)

Awards
- EAA/A-10 Coach of the Year (1982)

Wendell Gale Catlett (born October 31, 1940) is a retired American basketball coach who was head coach at the University of Cincinnati and West Virginia University.

== Playing career ==
Born in Hedgesville, West Virginia, Catlett played for West Virginia from 1958 to 1963. He played on the freshman team in 1958–59, but missed the 1959–60 season with a broken wrist. During his three varsity seasons (1960–61 through 1962–63), he helped the Mountaineers to two NCAA tournament berths. West Virginia went 24–4, 24–6 and 23–8 during Catlett's varsity seasons and won the Southern Conference title every season. The 6-foot-5 forward totaled 407 points and 275 rebounds on Coach George King's guard-oriented teams.

== Assistant coach ==
After completing his senior season in 1963, Catlett immediately turned to coaching. He got a job as an assistant coach at the University of Richmond under head coach Lew Mills, then at Davidson College in 1965 under Lefty Driesell, Kansas from 1967 to 1971 under Ted Owens, and finally Kentucky under Adolph Rupp in the 1971–72 season.

== Head coach ==
In 1972, Gale Catlett was named head coach of University of Cincinnati, succeeding Tay Baker, whose team had gone 17–9 the year before. In Catlett's first season, 1972–73, the Bearcats were also 17–9, and they improved to 19–8 the following year. It was the 1974–75 season that Catlett and the Bearcats reached national prominence. Led by a crop of highly touted recruits including Pat Cummings, Brian Williams, Robert Miller, Mike Jones, Gary Yoder and Steve Collier, the Bearcats were 23–6 and advanced to the NCAA Midwest Regional semifinals. By 1975–76, the team won the Metro Conference, posted a 25–6 record and were expected to make a deep run into the tournament, but the Bearcats were upset in the first round on a last-second tip-in by Notre Dame. During the three seasons from 1974–75 through 1976–77, the Bearcats were consistently ranked in the AP Poll, reaching as high as #2 in January 1977. That season, the Bearcats were 25–5 and again won the Metro Conference, but they were again ousted in the first round of the NCAA tournament.

In six seasons at Cincinnati, Catlett posted a record of 126–44 (a .741 winning percentage). He left Cincinnati after a 17–10 season and under a cloud after the basketball program was penalized by the NCAA for numerous recruiting violations during his tenure.

In 1978, he took over the head coaching job at West Virginia. During the decade before his arrival, the Mountaineers were 116–121. Over the next 24 seasons, he posted a 439–276 record. Catlett's West Virginia teams won an average of 19 games a season and made eight trips to the NCAA tournament, including a 1998 Sweet 16 appearance, where they upset a highly touted Cincinnati team. In 1997, he was nominated as the Big East Coach of the Year, but failed to win as John MacLeod took that honor. On February 13, 2002, at age 61, he announced his retirement. He had a career college coaching record of 565–320.

In late 2005 Catlett publicly stated that he was considering running in the 2006 Republican primary in order to challenge incumbent Democratic Senator Robert Byrd. He later declined to run.

== Head coaching record ==
Record table
Season	Team	Overall	Conference	Standing	Postseason
Cincinnati Bearcats (NCAA University Division / Division I Independent) (1972–1975)
1972–73	Cincinnati	17–9			
1973–74	Cincinnati	19–8			NIT first round
1974–75	Cincinnati	23–6			NCAA Division I Sweet 16
Cincinnati Bearcats (Metro Conference) (1975–1978)
1975–76	Cincinnati	25–6	2–1	T–2nd	NCAA Division I first round
1976–77	Cincinnati	25–5	4–2	2nd	NCAA Division I first round
1977–78	Cincinnati	17–10	6–6	T–4th	
Cincinnati:		126–44	12–9		
West Virginia Mountaineers (Eastern Athletic Association / Atlantic 10 Conference) (1978–1995)
1978–79	West Virginia	16–12	7–3	T–2nd	
1979–80	West Virginia	15–14	4–6	7th	
1980–81	West Virginia	23–10	9–4	3rd	NIT Semifinals
1981–82	West Virginia	27–4	13–1	1st	NCAA Division I second round
1982–83	West Virginia	23–8	10–4	T–1st (West)	NCAA Division I first round
1983–84	West Virginia	20–12	9–9	T–4th	NCAA Division I second round
1984–85	West Virginia	20–9	16–2	1st	NIT first round
1985–86	West Virginia	22–11	15–3	T–2nd	NCAA Division I first round
1986–87	West Virginia	23–8	15–3	2nd	NCAA Division I first round
1987–88	West Virginia	18–14	12–6	3rd	
1988–89	West Virginia	26–5	17–1	1st	NCAA Division I second round
1989–90	West Virginia	16–12	11–7	T–3rd	
1990–91	West Virginia	17–14	10–8	T–3rd	NIT second round
1991–92	West Virginia	20–12	10–6	3rd	NCAA Division I first round
1992–93	West Virginia	17–12	7–7	6th	NIT second round
1993–94	West Virginia	17–12	8–8	T–3rd	NIT second round
1994–95	West Virginia	13–13	7–9	T–6th	
West Virginia Mountaineers (Big East Conference) (1995–2002)
1995–96	West Virginia	12–15	7–11	4th (BE 6)	
1996–97	West Virginia	21–10	11–7	3rd (BE 6)	NIT Quarterfinals
1997–98	West Virginia	24–9	11–7	3rd (BE 6)	NCAA Division I Sweet 16
1998–99	West Virginia	10–19	4–14	12th	
1999–00	West Virginia	14–14	6–10	T–8th	
2000–01	West Virginia	17–12	8–8	4th (West)	NIT first round
2001–02	West Virginia	8–20	1–15	7th (West)	
West Virginia:		439–281	228–159		
Total:		565–325			
National champion Postseason invitational champion Conference regular season champion Conference regular season and conference tournament champion Division regular season champion Division regular season and conference tournament champion Conference tournament champion
