= 1983 Atlantic 10 men's basketball tournament =

- Classification: Division I
- Season: 1982–83
- Teams: 10
- Site: The Spectrum; Philadelphia, Pennsylvania
- Champions: West Virginia (1st title)
- Winning coach: Gale Catlett (1st title)
- MVP: Terence Stansbury (Temple)

1982–83 Atlantic 10 men's basketball standings
	Conf.				Overall
Team	W		L	PCT	W		L	PCT
East
Rutgers	11	–	3	.786	23	–	8	.742
Saint Joseph's	8	–	6	.571	15	–	13	.536
Temple	5	–	9	.357	14	–	15	.483
UMass	4	–	10	.286	9	–	20	.310
Rhode Island	3	–	11	.214	9	–	19	.321
West
West Virginia †	10	–	4	.714	23	–	8	.742
St. Bonaventure	10	–	4	.714	20	–	10	.667
Penn State	9	–	5	.643	17	–	11	.607
Duquesne	6	–	8	.429	12	–	16	.429
George Washington	4	–	10	.286	14	–	15	.483
† 1983 Atlantic 10 Tournament winner Rankings from AP Poll

The 1983 Atlantic 10 men's basketball tournament was the seventh held by the Atlantic 10 Conference, and the first under the conference's current name. It was held in Philadelphia at The Spectrum from March 7–12, 1983. West Virginia defeated Temple 86-78 to win their first tournament championship. Terence Stansbury of Temple was named the Most Outstanding Player of the tournament.

== Bracket ==
First round March 7, 1983
E4	Massachusetts	91
E5	Rhode Island	74
W4	Duquesne	70
W5	George Washington	71

Quarterfinals; March 9, 1983
E1	Rutgers	79
E4	Massachusetts	73
E2	St. Joseph's (PA)	69
E3	Temple	88
W1	St. Bonaventure	77
W5	George Washington	67
W2	West Virginia	82
W3	Penn State	72

Semi-Finals; March 11, 1983
E1	Rutgers	67
E3	Temple	72
W1	St. Bonaventure	62
W2	West Virginia	86

Finals; March 12, 1983
E3	Temple	78
W2	West Virginia	86
