= 1982–83 Rutgers Scarlet Knights men's basketball team =

American college basketball season

1982–83 Rutgers Scarlet Knights men's basketball

Atlantic-10 East division champions

NCAA tournament, Second round
- Conference: Atlantic-10 Conference
- Record: 23–8 (11–3 A-10)
- Head coach: Tom Young (10th season)
- Home arena: Louis Brown Athletic Center

1982–83 Atlantic 10 men's basketball standings
	Conf.				Overall
Team	W		L	PCT	W		L	PCT
East
Rutgers	11	–	3	.786	23	–	8	.742
Saint Joseph's	8	–	6	.571	15	–	13	.536
Temple	5	–	9	.357	14	–	15	.483
UMass	4	–	10	.286	9	–	20	.310
Rhode Island	3	–	11	.214	9	–	19	.321
West
West Virginia †	10	–	4	.714	23	–	8	.742
St. Bonaventure	10	–	4	.714	20	–	10	.667
Penn State	9	–	5	.643	17	–	11	.607
Duquesne	6	–	8	.429	12	–	16	.429
George Washington	4	–	10	.286	14	–	15	.483
† 1983 Atlantic 10 Tournament winner Rankings from AP Poll

The 1982–83 Rutgers Scarlet Knights men's basketball team represented Rutgers University as a member of the Atlantic-10 Conference during the 1982–83 NCAA Division I men's basketball season. The head coach was Tom Young and the team played its home games in Louis Brown Athletic Center in Piscataway Township, New Jersey. The Scarlet Knights finished first in the conference's East division, but lost in the semifinals of the Atlantic-10 tournament. The Scarlet Knights received an at-large bid to the NCAA tournament. After an opening round win over Southwestern Louisiana, Rutgers fell to St. John's, 66–55, in the round of 32. Rutgers finished with a 23–8 record (11–3 A-10).

== Roster ==
1982–83 Rutgers Scarlet Knights men's basketball team
Players
Coaches

Pos.	#	Name	Height	Weight	Year	Hometown
G	10	John Battle	6 ft 2 in (1.88 m)	170 lb (77 kg)	So	Washington, D.C.
G/F	20	Kevin Black	6 ft 6 in (1.98 m)	185 lb (84 kg)	Sr	Washington, D.C.
G	24	Brian Ellerbe	6 ft 1 in (1.85 m)	—	So	Bowie, Maryland
G	30	Rich Brunson	6 ft 2 in (1.88 m)	170 lb (77 kg)	Sr	Queens, New York
F/C	32	Roy Hinson	6 ft 9 in (2.06 m)	220 lb (100 kg)	Sr	Somerset, New Jersey
F	35	Clarence Tillman	6 ft 7 in (2.01 m)	205 lb (93 kg)	Sr	Philadelphia, Pennsylvania

Head coach

- Tom Young (Rutgers)

Assistant coach(es)

Legend

- (C) Team captain
- (S) Suspended
- (I) Ineligible
- (W) Walk-on
- Injured
- Current redshirt

== Schedule and results ==
Date time, TV	Rank^{#}	Opponent^{#}	Result	Record	Site (attendance) city, state
Regular season
Nov 27, 1982*		Fairleigh Dickinson	W 88–70	1–0	Louis Brown Athletic Center; Piscataway, New Jersey
Nov 30, 1982*		Princeton; Rivalry	W 60–55	2–0	Louis Brown Athletic Center; Piscataway, New Jersey
Dec 2, 1982*		vs. Jacksonville	W 71–65	3–0	Meadowlands Arena; East Rutherford, New Jersey
Dec 6, 1982*		Oregon	W 53–42	4–0	Louis Brown Athletic Center; Piscataway, New Jersey
Dec 11, 1982*		at Lafayette	W 57–50	5–0	Kirby Sports Center; Easton, Pennsylvania
Dec 17, 1982*		vs. Tulane; Kentucky Invitational	L 54–55	5–1	Rupp Arena; Lexington, Kentucky
Dec 18, 1982*		vs. Duquesne; Kentucky Invitational	W 58–51	6–1	Rupp Arena; Lexington, Kentucky
Dec 23, 1982*		Stanford	W 70–63	7–1	Louis Brown Athletic Center; Piscataway, New Jersey
Jan 5, 1983*		vs. No. 18 North Carolina	L 69–86	7–2	Greensboro Coliseum; Greensboro, North Carolina
Jan 8, 1983		at Saint Joseph's	W 70–65	8–2 (1–0)	Hagan Arena; Philadelphia, Pennsylvania
Jan 10, 1983*		Lehigh	W 88–69	9–2	Louis Brown Athletic Center; Piscataway, New Jersey
Jan 15, 1983		UMass	W 79–67	10–2 (2–0)	Louis Brown Athletic Center; Piscataway, New Jersey
Jan 17, 1983		Saint Joseph's	W 79–77	11–2 (3–0)	Louis Brown Athletic Center; Piscataway, New Jersey
Jan 22, 1983		West Virginia	L 63–71	11–3 (3–1)	Louis Brown Athletic Center; Piscataway, New Jersey
Jan 26, 1983*		vs. No. 8 Louisville	L 49–54	11–4	Madison Square Garden; New York, New York
Jan 29, 1983		vs. Temple	W 70–68	12–4 (4–1)	The Palestra; Philadelphia, Pennsylvania
Feb 3, 1983		vs. Rhode Island	W 85–67	13–4 (5–1)	Providence Civic Center; Providence, Rhode Island
Feb 5, 1983		at UMass	W 62–60	14–4 (6–1)	Curry Hicks Cage; Amherst, Massachusetts
Feb 7, 1983*		Rider	W 84–73	15–4	Louis Brown Athletic Center; Piscataway, New Jersey
Feb 10, 1983		St. Bonaventure	W 78–66	16–4 (7–1)	Louis Brown Athletic Center; Piscataway, New Jersey
Feb 16, 1983		Temple	W 79–73	17–4 (8–1)	Louis Brown Athletic Center; Piscataway, New Jersey
Feb 16, 1983		C. W. Post	W 92–63	18–4	Louis Brown Athletic Center; Piscataway, New Jersey
Feb 22, 1983		at Duquesne	W 78–73	19–4 (9–1)	Civic Arena; Pittsburgh, Pennsylvania
Feb 26, 1983		George Washington	W 75–48	20–4 (10–1)	Louis Brown Athletic Center; Piscataway, New Jersey
Feb 28, 1983		at St. Bonaventure	L 66–68 ^{OT}	20–5 (10–2)	Reilly Center; St. Bonaventure, New York
Mar 2, 1983		Rhode Island	W 82–73	21–5 (11–2)	Louis Brown Athletic Center; Piscataway, New Jersey
Mar 5, 1983		at Penn State	L 70–79	21–6 (11–3)	Rec Hall; University Park, Pennsylvania
Atlantic-10 tournament
Mar 9, 1983*		vs. UMass; Quarterfinals	W 79–73	22–6	The Spectrum; Philadelphia, Pennsylvania
Mar 11, 1983*		at Temple; Semifinals	L 67–72	22–7	The Spectrum; Philadelphia, Pennsylvania
NCAA tournament
Mar 18, 1983*	(9 E)	vs. (8 E) Southwestern Louisiana; First round	W 60–53	23–7	Hartford Civic Center; Hartford, Connecticut
Mar 20, 1983*	(9 E)	vs. (1 E) No. 3 St. John's; Second round	L 55–66	23–8	Hartford Civic Center; Hartford, Connecticut
*Non-conference game. ^{#}Rankings from AP Poll. (#) Tournament seedings in parentheses. All times are in Eastern Time.

== Awards and honors ==
- Roy Hinson – Atlantic 10 co-Player of the Year

== NBA draft ==
Round	Pick	Player	NBA club
1	20	Roy Hinson	Cleveland Cavaliers
