= 1982 Eastern 8 men's basketball tournament =

- Classification: Division I
- Season: 1981–82
- Teams: 8
- Site: Civic Arena; Pittsburgh
- Champions: Pittsburgh (2nd title)
- Winning coach: Roy Chipman (2nd title)
- MVP: Clyde Vaughan (Pittsburgh)

1981–82 Eastern 8 men's basketball standings
	Conf.				Overall
Team	W		L	PCT	W		L	PCT
No. 14 West Virginia	13	–	1	.929	27	–	4	.871
Rutgers	9	–	5	.643	20	–	10	.667
Pittsburgh †	8	–	6	.571	20	–	10	.667
St. Bonaventure	7	–	7	.500	14	–	14	.500
George Washington	7	–	7	.500	13	–	14	.481
Duquesne	5	–	9	.357	11	–	16	.407
Rhode Island	4	–	10	.286	10	–	17	.370
UMass	3	–	11	.214	7	–	20	.259
† 1982 Eastern 8 Tournament winner Rankings from AP Poll

The 1982 Eastern 8 men's basketball tournament was the sixth annual postseason tournament of the Eastern Athletic Association, popularly known as the Eastern 8. This was also the last tournament to be branded as "Eastern 8"; in the following school year, the conference adopted its current name, the Atlantic 10 Conference. The first round was held at campus sites and the semifinals and final were held in Pittsburgh at the Civic Arena. Pittsburgh defeated West Virginia 79–72 to win their second tournament championship. Clyde Vaughan of Pittsburgh was named the Most Outstanding Player of the tournament.

== Bracket ==
Quarterfinals; March 2, 1982
1	#9 West Virginia	91
8	Massachusetts	70
4	George Washington	66
5	St. Bonaventure	69
2	Rutgers	66
7	Rhode Island	64
3	Pittsburgh	67
6	Duquesne	63

Semi-Finals; March 5, 1982
1	#9 West Virginia	80
5	St. Bonaventure	65
2	Rutgers	47
3	Pittsburgh	60

Finals; March 6, 1982
1	#9 West Virginia	72
3	Pittsburgh	79
