= 1984 Atlantic 10 men's basketball tournament =

- Classification: Division I
- Season: 1983–84
- Teams: 10
- Site: WVU Coliseum; Morgantown, West Virginia
- Champions: West Virginia (2nd title)
- Winning coach: Gale Catlett (2nd title)
- MVP: Lester Rowe (West Virginia)

1983–84 Atlantic 10 men's basketball standings
	Conf.				Overall
Team	W		L	PCT	W		L	PCT
No. 20 Temple	18	–	0	1.000	26	–	5	.839
Saint Joseph's	13	–	5	.722	20	–	9	.690
George Washington	11	–	7	.611	17	–	12	.586
West Virginia †	9	–	9	.500	20	–	12	.625
Rutgers	9	–	9	.500	15	–	13	.536
St. Bonaventure	8	–	10	.444	18	–	13	.581
Duquesne	8	–	10	.444	10	–	18	.357
UMass	6	–	12	.333	12	–	17	.414
Rhode Island	5	–	13	.278	6	–	22	.214
Penn State	3	–	15	.167	5	–	22	.185
† 1984 Atlantic 10 Tournament winner Rankings from AP Poll

The 1984 Atlantic 10 men's basketball tournament was held in Morgantown, West Virginia at WVU Coliseum from March 7–10, 1984. West Virginia defeated St. Bonaventure 59–56 to win their second tournament championship. Lester Rowe of West Virginia was named the Most Outstanding Player of the tournament.

== Bracket ==
First round March 7, 1984
8	Massachusetts	69
9	Rhode Island	67
7	St. Bonaventure	71
10	Penn State	57

Quarterfinals; March 8, 1984
1	#15 Temple	78
8	Massachusetts	54
4	Rutgers	73
5	West Virginia	93
2	St. Joseph's (PA)	67
7	St. Bonaventure	68
3	George Washington	79
6	Duquesne	66

Semi-Finals; March 9, 1984
1	#15 Temple	65
5	West Virginia	67
3	George Washington	75
7	St. Bonaventure	81

Finals; March 10, 1984
5	West Virginia	59
7	St. Bonaventure	56
