= 1975–76 Cincinnati Bearcats men's basketball team =

American college basketball season

1975–76 Cincinnati Bearcats men's basketball

Metro tournament champions

NCAA tournament, Round of 32
- Conference: Metro Conference (1975–1995)

Ranking
- Coaches: No. 16
- AP: No. 12
- Record: 25–6 (2–1 Metro)
- Head coach: Gale Catlett
- Home arena: Armory Fieldhouse

1975–76 Metro Conference men's basketball standings
	Conf.				Overall
Team	W		L	PCT	W		L	PCT
Tulane	1	–	0	1.000	18	–	9	.667
No. 12 Cincinnati †	2	–	1	.667	25	–	6	.806
Louisville	2	–	1	.667	20	–	8	.714
Memphis State	1	–	1	.500	21	–	9	.700
Georgia Tech	0	–	1	.000	13	–	14	.481
Saint Louis	0	–	2	.000	13	–	14	.481
† 1976 Metro Conference tournament winner Rankings from AP Poll

The 1975–76 Cincinnati Bearcats men's basketball team represented the University of Cincinnati in the 1975-76 NCAA Division I men's basketball season. The Bearcats were led by head coach Gale Catlett, as first year members of the Metro Conference. They defeated Georgia Tech, and Memphis State to win the Metro tournament for the first consecutive year, and received the conference's automatic bid to the NCAA tournament. They lost 78–79 to Notre Dame.

== Schedule ==
Date time, TV	Rank^{#}	Opponent^{#}	Result	Record	Site city, state
Regular Season
November 29*		Cleveland State	W 98–65	1–0	Armory Fieldhouse; Cincinnati, OH
December 1*		Miami (OH)	W 66–57	2–0	Armory Fieldhouse; Cincinnati, OH
December 3*		Wright State	W 118–70	3–0	Armory Fieldhouse; Cincinnati, OH
December 6*		South Florida	W 96–75	4–0	Armory Fieldhouse; Cincinnati, OH
December 8*		Biscayne	W 74–52	5–0	Armory Fieldhouse; Cincinnati, OH
December 13*		Bowling Green State	W 98–81	6–0	Armory Fieldhouse; Cincinnati, OH
December 16*		St. Joseph (IN)	W 120–49	7–0	Armory Fieldhouse; Cincinnati, OH
December 23*		at Pepperdine	W 76–74	8–0	Firestone Fieldhouse; Malibu, CA
December 27*		vs. Arizona; Rainbow Classic	L 64–71	8–1	Neal S. Blaisdell Center; Honolulu, HI
December 29*		vs. Holy Cross; Rainbow Classic	L 65–66	8–2	Neal S. Blaisdell Center; Honolulu, HI
December 30*		vs. Yale; Rainbow Classic	W 83–55	9–2	Neal S. Blaisdell Center; Honolulu, HI
January 6		Louisville	W 77–73	10–2 (1–0)	Armory Fieldhouse; Cincinnati, OH
January 10*		Eastern Kentucky	W 73–66	11–2 (1–0)	Armory Fieldhouse; Cincinnati, OH
January 14*		at Temple	W 79–56	12–2 (1–0)	McGonigle Hall; Philadelphia, PA
January 17*		UW-Milwaukee	W 76–61	13–2 (1–0)	Armory Fieldhouse; Cincinnati, OH
January 24		at Memphis	L 79–85	13–3 (1–1)	Mid-South Coliseum; Memphis, TN
January 26*		at Wichita State	W 92–85	14–3 (1–1)	Levitt Arena; Wichita, KS
January 31*		George Washington	W 102–72	15–3 (1–1)	Armory Fieldhouse; Cincinnati, OH
February 4*		Pittsburgh	W 98–77	16–3 (1–1)	Armory Fieldhouse; Cincinnati, OH
February 7*		Jacksonville	W 87–62	17–3 (1–1)	Armory Fieldhouse; Cincinnati, OH
February 14		Saint Louis	W 60–45	18–3 (2–1)	Armory Fieldhouse; Cincinnati, OH
February 18*		Xavier	W 81–74	19–3 (2–1)	Armory Fieldhouse; Cincinnati, OH
February 21*		at DePaul	L 60–70	19–4 (2–1)	Alumni Hall; Chicago, IL
February 23*		at West Virginia	W 66–56	20–4 (2–1)	Charleston Civic Center; Charleston, WV
February 25*		San Francisco	W 89–88	21–4 (2–1)	Armory Fieldhouse; Cincinnati, OH
February 29*		at Duquesne	W 80–73	22–4 (2–1)	Mellon Arena; Pittsburgh, PA
March 2*		at Loyola (IL)	W 69–67	22–5 (2–1)	Alumni Gym; Chicago, IL
Metro Tournament
March 5		vs. Georgia Tech	W 71–60	23–5 (2–1)	Freedom Hall; Louisville, KY
March 6		vs. Memphis	W 103–95	24–5 (2–1)	Freedom Hall; Louisville, KY
Regular Season
March 9*		vs. Dayton	W 85–84	25–5 (2–1)	University of Dayton Arena; Dayton, OH
NCAA Tournament
March 13*	No. 12	vs. No. 7 Notre Dame; Second Round	L 78–79	25–6 (2–1)	Freedom Hall; Louisville, KY
*Non-conference game. ^{#}Rankings from AP Poll. (#) Tournament seedings in parentheses.
