= 1989 Atlantic 10 men's basketball tournament =

- Classification: Division I
- Season: 1988–89
- Teams: 10
- Site: The Palestra; Philadelphia
- Finals site: Rutgers Athletic Center; Piscataway, New Jersey
- Champions: Rutgers University (2nd title)
- Winning coach: Bob Wenzel (1st title)
- MVP: Tom Savage (Rutgers)

1988–89 Atlantic 10 men's basketball standings
	Conf.				Overall
Team	W		L	PCT	W		L	PCT
No. 17 West Virginia	17	–	1	.944	26	–	5	.839
Temple	15	–	3	.833	18	–	12	.600
Rutgers †	13	–	5	.722	18	–	13	.581
Penn State	12	–	6	.667	20	–	12	.625
Rhode Island	9	–	9	.500	13	–	15	.464
St. Bonaventure	7	–	11	.389	13	–	15	.464
Duquesne	7	–	11	.389	13	–	16	.448
UMass	5	–	13	.278	10	–	18	.357
Saint Joseph's	4	–	14	.222	8	–	21	.276
George Washington	1	–	17	.056	1	–	27	.036
† 1989 Atlantic 10 Tournament winner Rankings from AP Poll

The 1989 Atlantic 10 men's basketball tournament was played from March 4 to March 6, 1989, and March 9, 1989, at the Palestra in Philadelphia, Pennsylvania, except for the final that was played at Louis Brown Athletic Center in Piscataway, New Jersey. The winner was named champion of the Atlantic 10 Conference and received an automatic bid to the 1989 NCAA Men's Division I Basketball Tournament. Rutgers University won the tournament. West Virginia University also received a bid to the NCAA Tournament.

== Format ==
All ten conference members participated, with the top six teams in the conference received first-round byes. Seeds were based on regular season conference record.

== Bracket ==
First round March 4 Palestra, Philadelphia, PA
8	UMass	83
9	Saint Joseph's	87
7	Duquesne	74
10	George Washington	63

Quarterfinals; March 5 Palestra
1	#15 West Virginia	79
9	Saint Joseph's	59
4	Penn State	84
5	Rhode Island	68
2	Temple	64
7	Duquesne	51
3	Rutgers	100
6	St. Bonaventure	67

Semifinals; March 6 Palestra
1	#15 West Virginia	64
4	Penn State	86
2	Temple	59
3	Rutgers	62

Final; March 9 Louis Brown Athletic Center, Piscataway, NJ
4	Penn State	66
3	Rutgers	70
