= 1981–82 Pittsburgh Panthers men's basketball team =

American college basketball season

1981–82 Pittsburgh Panthers men's basketball

Eastern 8 tournament champions

NCAA tournament, First Round, L 88–99 vs. Pepperdine
- Conference: Eastern 8
- Record: 20–10 (8–6 Eastern 8)
- Head coach: Roy Chipman (2nd season)
- Assistant coaches: Reggie Warford (2nd season); Seth Greenberg (2nd season); Dave Progar (2nd season)
- Home arena: Fitzgerald Field House (Capacity: 4,122)

1981–82 Eastern 8 men's basketball standings
	Conf.				Overall
Team	W		L	PCT	W		L	PCT
No. 14 West Virginia	13	–	1	.929	27	–	4	.871
Rutgers	9	–	5	.643	20	–	10	.667
Pittsburgh †	8	–	6	.571	20	–	10	.667
St. Bonaventure	7	–	7	.500	14	–	14	.500
George Washington	7	–	7	.500	13	–	14	.481
Duquesne	5	–	9	.357	11	–	16	.407
Rhode Island	4	–	10	.286	10	–	17	.370
UMass	3	–	11	.214	7	–	20	.259
† 1982 Eastern 8 Tournament winner Rankings from AP Poll

The 1981–82 Pittsburgh Panthers men's basketball team represented the University of Pittsburgh in the 1981–82 NCAA Division I men's basketball season. Led by head coach Roy Chipman, the Panthers finished with a record of 20–10. They received an automatic bid to the 1982 NCAA Division I men's basketball tournament where they lost in the first round to Pepperdine. This was Pitt's last season in the Eastern 8 Conference. They moved to the Big East Conference next season.
