= 1991–92 West Virginia Mountaineers men's basketball team =

American college basketball season

1991–92 West Virginia Mountaineers men's basketball

NCAA tournament, first round
- Conference: Atlantic-10 Conference
- Record: 20–12 (10–6 A-10)
- Head coach: Gale Catlett (14th season)
- Home arena: WVU Coliseum

1991–92 Atlantic 10 men's basketball standings
	Conf.				Overall
Team	W		L	PCT	W		L	PCT
No. 17 UMass †	13	–	3	.813	30	–	5	.857
Temple	11	–	5	.688	17	–	13	.567
West Virginia	10	–	6	.625	20	–	12	.625
Rhode Island	9	–	7	.563	22	–	10	.688
George Washington	8	–	8	.500	16	–	12	.571
Rutgers	6	–	10	.375	16	–	15	.516
Duquesne	6	–	10	.375	13	–	15	.464
Saint Joseph's	6	–	10	.375	13	–	15	.464
St. Bonaventure	3	–	13	.188	9	–	19	.321
† 1992 Atlantic 10 Tournament winner Rankings from AP Poll

The 1991–92 West Virginia Mountaineers men's basketball team represented West Virginia University as a member of the Atlantic-10 Conference during the 1991-92 season. The team played their home games at WVU Coliseum in Morgantown, West Virginia. Led by 14th-year head coach Gale Catlett, the Mountaineers received an at-large bid to the 1992 NCAA tournament as the No. 12 seed in the East region.

== Roster ==
1991–92 West Virginia Mountaineers men's basketball team
Players
Coaches

Pos.	#	Name	Height	Weight	Year	Hometown
G	11	Chris Leonard	6 ft 4 in (1.93 m)	185 lb (84 kg)	Sr	Purcellville, Virginia
F	21	Ricky Robinson	6 ft 8 in (2.03 m)	245 lb (111 kg)	So	Roselle, New Jersey
G	31	Mike Boyd	6 ft 1 in (1.85 m)	170 lb (77 kg)	So	Orange, New Jersey
F/C	40	Jeremy Bodkin	6 ft 9 in (2.06 m)	250 lb (113 kg)	Jr	Upper Tract, West Virginia
F	41	Pervires Greene	6 ft 8 in (2.03 m)	195 lb (88 kg)	So	Oak Hill, West Virginia

Head coach

- Gale Catlett

Assistant coach(es)

Legend

- (C) Team captain
- (S) Suspended
- (I) Ineligible
- (W) Walk-on
- Injured
- Current redshirt

== Schedule and results ==
Date time, TV	Rank^{#}	Opponent^{#}	Result	Record	Site city, state
Regular Season
Nov 20, 1991*		at No. 4 Kentucky	L 80–106	0–1	Rupp Arena; Lexington, Kentucky
Dec 2, 1991*		Radford	W 83–49	1–1	WVU Coliseum; Morgantown, West Virginia
Dec 5, 1991*		Robert Morris	W 79–69	2–1	WVU Coliseum; Morgantown, West Virginia
Dec 7, 1991*		at Maryland	L 91–101	2–2	Cole Fieldhouse; College Park, Maryland
Dec 11, 1991*		Buffalo	W 91–46	3–2	WVU Coliseum; Morgantown, West Virginia
Dec 14, 1991*		Pittsburgh; Backyard Brawl	W 86–85	4–2	WVU Coliseum; Morgantown, West Virginia
Dec 21, 1991*		at Virginia Tech	W 66–65	5–2	Cassell Coliseum; Blacksburg, Virginia
Dec 23, 1991*		at Old Dominion	L 82–83	5–3	Norfolk Scope; Norfolk, Virginia
Dec 27, 1991*		vs. Boston College; Cable Car Classic	W 95–80	6–3	Toso Pavilion; Santa Clara, California
Dec 28, 1991*		vs. UAB; Cable Car Classic	L 84–88	6–4	Toso Pavilion; Santa Clara, California
Jan 4, 1992		Temple	L 62–63	6–5 (0–1)	WVU Coliseum; Morgantown, West Virginia
Jan 8, 1992		at No. 25 UMass	W 76–75	7–5 (1–1)	Curry Hicks Cage; Amherst, Massachusetts
Jan 11, 1992		Duquesne	W 83–75	8–5 (2–1)	WVU Coliseum; Morgantown, West Virginia
Jan 13, 1992*		Notre Dame	W 87–67	9–5	WVU Coliseum; Morgantown, West Virginia
Jan 16, 1992		at Temple	W 67–62	10–5 (3–1)	McGonigle Hall; Philadelphia, Pennsylvania
Jan 22, 1992*		vs. Marshall; Rivalry	W 90–76	11–5	Charleston Civic Center; Charleston, West Virginia
Jan 25, 1992		George Washington	W 79–55	12–5 (4–1)	WVU Coliseum; Morgantown, West Virginia
Jan 30, 1992		at Saint Joseph's	W 88–77	13–5 (5–1)	Hagan Arena; Philadelphia, Pennsylvania
Feb 2, 1992		at Rutgers	W 88–84	14–5 (6–1)	Louis Brown Athletic Center; Piscataway, New Jersey
Feb 6, 1992		Rhode Island	W 90–78	15–5 (7–1)	WVU Coliseum; Morgantown, West Virginia
Feb 8, 1992		St. Bonaventure	W 70–42	16–5 (8–1)	WVU Coliseum; Morgantown, West Virginia
Feb 12, 1992		Rutgers	L 95–98	16–6 (8–2)	WVU Coliseum; Morgantown, West Virginia
Feb 15, 1992		at St. Bonaventure	W 78–70	17–6 (9–2)	Reilly Center; St. Bonaventure, New York
Feb 18, 1992		at Rhode Island	L 67–88	17–7 (9–3)	Keaney Gymnasium; Kingston, Rhode Island
Feb 23, 1992		at George Washington	L 78–85	17–8 (9–4)	Charles E. Smith Center; Washington, D.C.
Feb 27, 1992*		UMass	L 69–74 ^{OT}	17–9 (9–5)	WVU Coliseum; Morgantown, West Virginia
Feb 29, 1992*		Saint Joseph's	W 95–82	18–9 (10–5)	WVU Coliseum; Morgantown, West Virginia
Mar 4, 1992		at Duquesne	L 64–71	18–10 (10–6)	A.J. Palumbo Center; Pittsburgh, Pennsylvania
Atlantic-10 Tournament
Mar 8, 1992*		vs. Duquesne; Quarterfinals	W 76–69	19–10	The Palestra; Philadelphia, Pennsylvania
Mar 9, 1992		vs. Temple; Semifinals	W 44–41	20–10 (10–6)	The Palestra; Philadelphia, Pennsylvania
Mar 12, 1992*		at No. 22 UMass; Quarterfinals	L 91–97	20–11	Curry Hicks Cage; Amherst, Massachusetts
NCAA Tournament
Mar 19, 1992*	(12 E)	vs. (5 E) No. 16 Missouri; First Round	L 78–89	20–12	Greensboro Coliseum; Greensboro, North Carolina
*Non-conference game. ^{#}Rankings from AP Poll. (#) Tournament seedings in parentheses. E=East. All times are in Eastern.
