= 1992 Atlantic 10 men's basketball tournament =

- Classification: Division I
- Season: 1991–92
- Teams: 9
- Site: McGonigle Hall (first round), The Palestra (second round, semifinals); Philadelphia and Curry Hicks Cage (championship); Amherst, Massachusetts
- Champions: UMass (1st title)
- Winning coach: John Calipari (1st title)
- MVP: Harper Williams (UMass)

1991–92 Atlantic 10 men's basketball standings
	Conf.				Overall
Team	W		L	PCT	W		L	PCT
No. 17 UMass †	13	–	3	.813	30	–	5	.857
Temple	11	–	5	.688	17	–	13	.567
West Virginia	10	–	6	.625	20	–	12	.625
Rhode Island	9	–	7	.563	22	–	10	.688
George Washington	8	–	8	.500	16	–	12	.571
Rutgers	6	–	10	.375	16	–	15	.516
Duquesne	6	–	10	.375	13	–	15	.464
Saint Joseph's	6	–	10	.375	13	–	15	.464
St. Bonaventure	3	–	13	.188	9	–	19	.321
† 1992 Atlantic 10 Tournament winner Rankings from AP Poll

The 1992 Atlantic 10 men's basketball tournament was played from March 7 to March 9, 1992, and March 12, 1992. The first round game was played at McGonigle Hall in Philadelphia, Pennsylvania. The second round and semifinal games were played at the Palestra in Philadelphia, while the championship game was played at Curry Hicks Cage in Amherst, Massachusetts. The winner was named champion of the Atlantic 10 Conference and received an automatic bid to the 1992 NCAA Men's Division I Basketball Tournament. The UMass Minutemen won the tournament. Temple also received a bid to the NCAA Tournament. Harper Williams of Massachusetts was named the tournament's Most Outstanding Player. In addition, teammate and future NBA player Lou Roe was among those also named to the All-Championship Team. The top seven teams in the conference received first-round byes.

== Bracket ==
First round Saturday, March 7 McGonigle Hall, Philadelphia, PA
8	Rutgers	93
9	St. Bonaventure	72

Quarterfinals; Sunday, March 8 Palestra, Philadelphia
1	#22 UMass	106
8	Rutgers	94
4	Rhode Island	75
5	George Washington	66
2	Temple	75
7	Saint Joseph's	59
3	West Virginia	76
6	Duquesne	66

Semifinals; Monday, March 9 Palestra
1	#22 UMass	78
4	Rhode Island	67
2	Temple	41
3	West Virginia	44

Final; Thursday, March 12; Curry Hicks Cage, Amherst, MA
1	#22 UMass	97
3	West Virginia	91
