= 1981–82 West Virginia Mountaineers men's basketball team =

American college basketball season

1981–82 West Virginia Mountaineers men's basketball

EAA Regular season champions

NCAA tournament, Second Round
- Conference: Eastern Athletic Association

Ranking
- Coaches: No. 17
- AP: No. 14
- Record: 27–4 (13–1 EAA)
- Head coach: Gale Catlett (4th season)
- Captains: Herbie Brooks; Darryl Prue
- Home arena: WVU Coliseum

1981–82 Eastern 8 men's basketball standings
	Conf.				Overall
Team	W		L	PCT	W		L	PCT
No. 14 West Virginia	13	–	1	.929	27	–	4	.871
Rutgers	9	–	5	.643	20	–	10	.667
Pittsburgh †	8	–	6	.571	20	–	10	.667
St. Bonaventure	7	–	7	.500	14	–	14	.500
George Washington	7	–	7	.500	13	–	14	.481
Duquesne	5	–	9	.357	11	–	16	.407
Rhode Island	4	–	10	.286	10	–	17	.370
UMass	3	–	11	.214	7	–	20	.259
† 1982 Eastern 8 Tournament winner Rankings from AP Poll

The 1981–82 West Virginia Mountaineers men's basketball team represented West Virginia University as a member of the Eastern Athletic Association during the 1981-82 season. The team played their home games at WVU Coliseum in Morgantown, West Virginia. Led by 4th-year head coach Gale Catlett, the Mountaineers took home the conference regular season title and received an at-large bid to the 1982 NCAA Tournament as No. 5 seed in the West region.

== Roster ==
1981–82 West Virginia Mountaineers men's basketball team
Players
Coaches

Pos.	#	Name	Height	Weight	Year	Hometown
G		Greg Jones	6 ft 2 in (1.88 m)	185 lb (84 kg)	Jr	Youngstown, Ohio
F	24	Lester Rowe	6 ft 5 in (1.96 m)	195 lb (88 kg)	Fr	Buffalo, New York

Head coach

- Gale Catlett

Assistant coach(es)

Legend

- (C) Team captain
- (S) Suspended
- (I) Ineligible
- (W) Walk-on
- Injured
- Current redshirt

== Schedule and results ==
Date time, TV	Rank^{#}	Opponent^{#}	Result	Record	Site city, state
Regular Season
Feb 27, 1982		at Rutgers	L 64–74	24–2 (13–1)	Louis Brown Athletic Center; Piscataway, New Jersey
EAA Tournament
Mar 1, 1982*	No. 9	UMass; Quarterfinals	W 91–70	25–2	WVU Coliseum; Morgantown, West Virginia
Mar 4, 1982*	No. 9	vs. St. Bonaventure; Semifinals	W 80–65	26–2	Civic Arena; Pittsburgh, Pennsylvania
Mar 7, 1982*	No. 9	vs. Pittsburgh; Championship game	L 72–79	26–3	Civic Arena; Pittsburgh, Pennsylvania
NCAA Tournament
Mar 11, 1982*	(5 W) No. 14	vs. (12 W) North Carolina A&T; First round	W 102–72	27–3	Dee Glen Smith Spectrum; Logan, Utah
Mar 13, 1982*	(5 W) No. 14	vs. (4 W) No. 11 Fresno State; Second round	L 46–50	27–4	Dee Glen Smith Spectrum; Logan, Utah
*Non-conference game. ^{#}Rankings from AP Poll. (#) Tournament seedings in parentheses. W=West. All times are in Eastern.
