= Harper Williams =

American basketball player (born 1971)

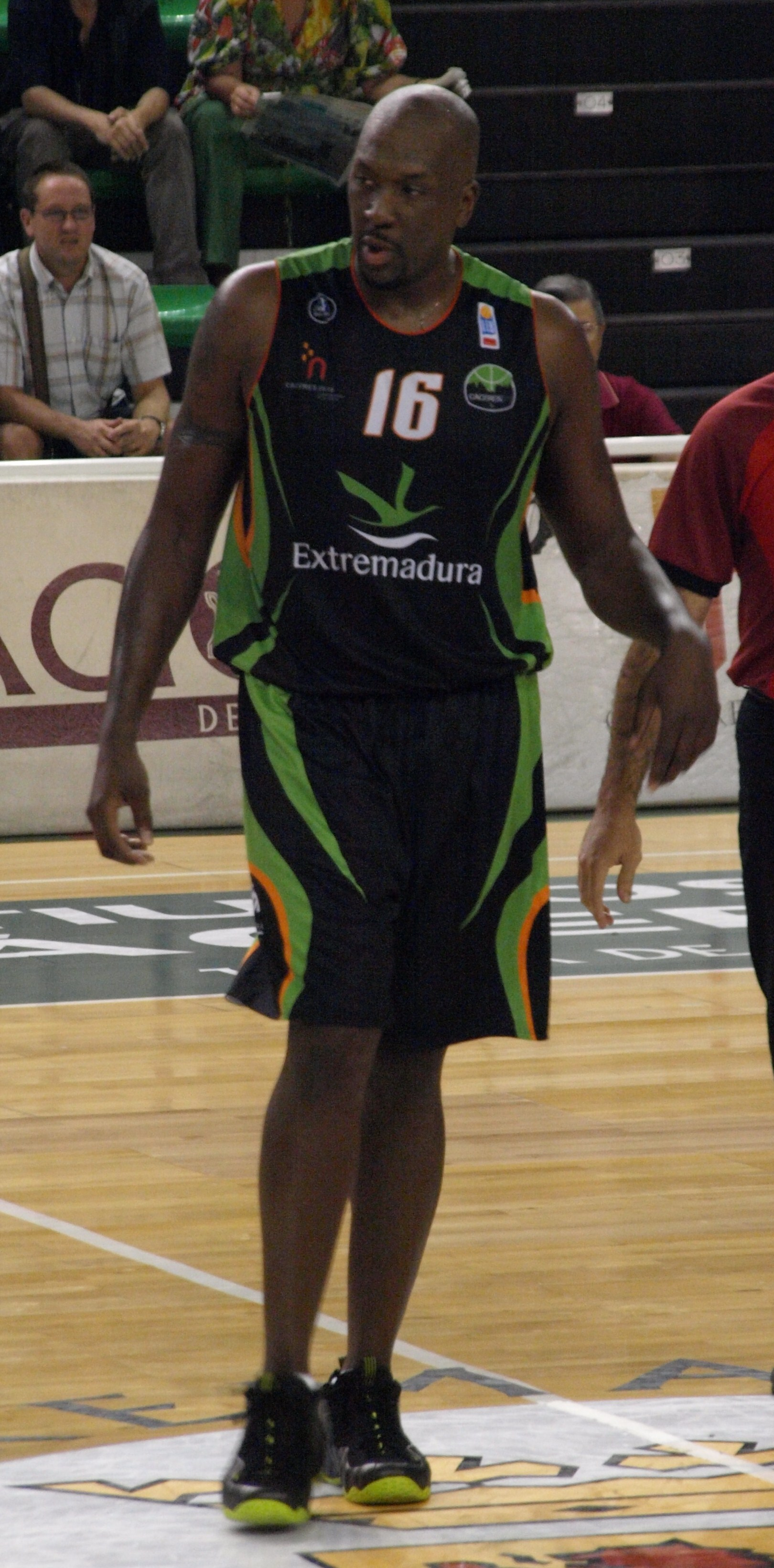
- Williams with Cáceres in 2008

Personal information
- Born: May 25, 1971 (age 55) Bridgeport, Connecticut, U.S.
- Listed height: 6 ft 7 in (2.01 m)
- Listed weight: 264 lb (120 kg)

Career information
- High school: Bassick (Bridgeport, Connecticut)
- College: UMass (1989–1993)
- NBA draft: 1993: undrafted
- Playing career: 1993–2010
- Position: Power forward
- Number: 16

Career history
- 1993–1994: Elmar León
- 1994–1995: Estudiantes
- 1995–1996: TDK Manresa
- 1996–1997: Estudiantes
- 1997–1999: León Caja España
- 1999–2000: Limoges CSP
- 2000–2001: Panionios
- 2001–2002: Fillattice Imola
- 2002–2005: Ricoh Manresa
- 2005–2006: Gran Canaria
- 2006–2007: Breogán
- 2007–2009: Cáceres 2016
- 2008–2009: Lobos Grises UAD
- 2009–2010: Franca

Career highlights
- FIBA Korać Cup champion (2000); Spanish Cup winner (1996); Spanish League All-Star (2003); Greek League All-Star (2001); French League champion (2000); French Federation Cup winner (2000); French League All-Star (2000); Atlantic 10 Player of the Year (1993); 2× First-team All-Atlantic 10 (1992, 1993); Third-team All-Atlantic 10 (1991); Atlantic 10 All-Freshman team (1990)

Harper Terry Williams (born May 25, 1971) is an American former basketball player who played professionally for 17 years, including ten in Spain's Liga ACB. He played college basketball for the UMass Minutemen.

== College and early life ==
Williams, a 6'8" power forward from Bridgeport, Connecticut, led Bassick High School to a 29–0 undefeated state championship season as a senior and was named 1989 Connecticut player of the year.

He went to the University of Massachusetts to play for coach John Calipari, where he became one of the key players in the Minutemen's resurgence. Williams led the Minutemen to two straight Atlantic 10 tournament titles as a junior and senior in 1992 and 1993 – their first in thirty years – and was tournament MVP in both events. In 1992, the Minutemen advanced to the Sweet 16 in the NCAA tournament.

Williams was named first team All-Atlantic 10 his last two seasons and was the Atlantic 10 Player of the Year in 1992. He finished his career with 1,543 points (12.9 points per game) and 854 rebounds (7.2 per game).

== Professional career ==
Following his UMass career, Williams was not drafted in the 1993 NBA draft. He instead began a long international career in Spain with Elmar León of Liga ACB. Williams would play ten total seasons in ACB. He was a league All-Star in 2003 with Manresa. He ranks in the top 30 all-time in the Liga ACB in points (5,193), rebounds (2,493), and blocked shots (459). He led the league in blocked shots in 2002.

Williams also played in the top leagues in France, Greece and Italy and was named an All-Star in Greece's HEBA A1 and in France's LNB Pro A. He also played in Mexico and Brazil in the latter stages of his career.

== Coaching career ==
On September 9, 2011, Williams was named as an administrative assistant on former UMass teammate Tony Barbee's staff at Auburn.
