= Lloyd Sharrar =

American basketball player (1936–1984)

Personal information
- Born: February 27, 1936 Meadville, Pennsylvania, U.S.
- Died: January 30, 1984 (aged 47) Lincoln, Nebraska, U.S.
- Listed height: 6 ft 10 in (2.08 m)
- Listed weight: 210 lb (95 kg)

Career information
- High school: Meadville (Meadville, Pennsylvania)
- College: West Virginia (1955–1958)
- NBA draft: 1958: 2nd round, 12th overall pick
- Drafted by: Philadelphia Warriors
- Position: Center

Career history
- 1958–1960: Wichita Vickers
- 1960–1961: Cleveland Pipers
- 1961–1964: Akron Wingfoots

Career highlights
- Second-team All-American – AP (1958); Third-team All-American – NABC, UPI (1958); 2× First-team All-SoCon (1957, 1958); AAU All-American (1964); 3× AAU champion (1959, 1961, 1964)
- Stats at Basketball Reference

Lloyd Sharrar (February 27, 1936 – January 30, 1984) was an American basketball player who was a college All-American at West Virginia University (WVU) and played for several years in the Amateur Athletic Union. He was also a second round pick of the Philadelphia Warriors in the 1958 NBA draft.

== Playing career ==
Sharrar was a 6'10 center from Meadville, Pennsylvania. He was recruited to West Virginia by Red Brown and stayed with the school through their coaching transition to Fred Schaus. There he was a three-year starter for one of the most successful periods in Mountaineer basketball history. He was captain of the school's 26–2 1957–58 team, teaming with future Hall of Fame guard Jerry West, and at the conclusion of the season was named a second-team All-American by the Associated Press and was a third-team selection by the National Association of Basketball Coaches (NABC) and United Press International (UPI). Sharrar finished his college career with 1,101 points and left as the school's all-time leading rebounder with 1,178 (a record that has since been broken). In 1998, Sharrar was named to WVU's athletic Hall of Fame.

He was drafted in 1958 by the Philadelphia Warriors in the second round of the NBA draft (12th pick overall), but opted instead to play industrial basketball in the AAU, which allowed him to start a business career while playing. Sharrar played six years of industrial basketball for the Wichita Vickers, the Cleveland Pipers and the Akron Wingfoots. He won three AAU championships (one with each team) and was named an AAU All-American in 1964.

== Personal ==
Sharrar died on January 30, 1984, in Lincoln, Nebraska, from a malignant brain tumor.
