= John Flowers (basketball) =

American basketball player (born 1989)

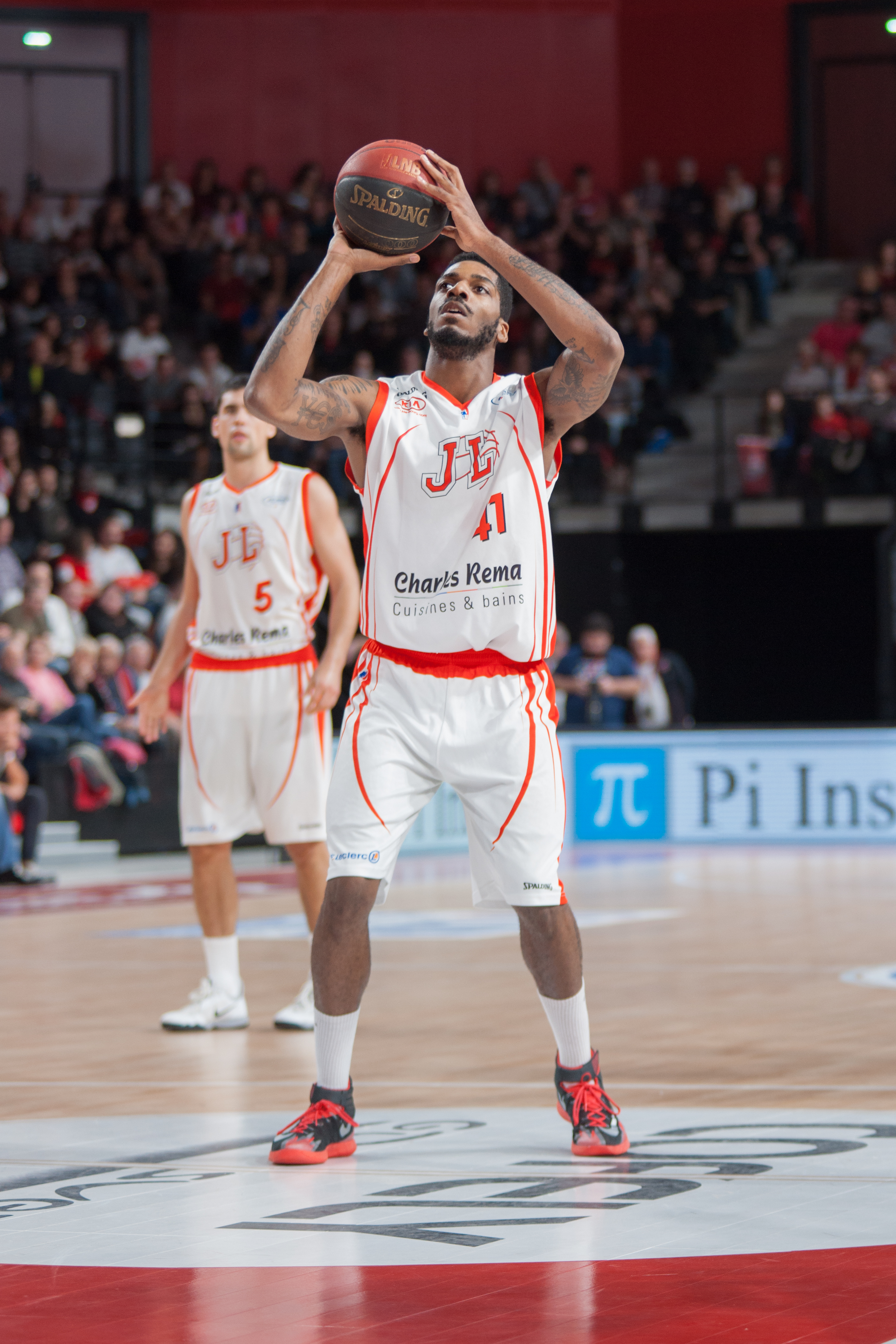

Club Atlético Peñarol
- Position: Small forward
- League: Liga Uruguaya de Básquetbol

Personal information
- Born: June 13, 1989 (age 37) Waldorf, Maryland
- Listed height: 6 ft 7 in (2.01 m)
- Listed weight: 215 lb (98 kg)

Career information
- High school: St. Mary's Ryken (Leonardtown, Maryland)
- College: West Virginia (2007–2011)
- NBA draft: 2011: undrafted
- Playing career: 2011–present

Career history
- 2011–2012: Saitama Broncos
- 2012–2013: Denain Voltaire Basket
- 2013–2015: JL Bourg
- 2015–2016: medi Bayreuth
- 2016–2017: Bambitious Nara
- 2017: Cocodrilos de Caracas
- 2017–2018: Soles de Mexicali
- 2018: Châlons-Reims
- 2019–2020: Soles de Mexicali
- 2020–2021: Boulazac
- 2021–2022: Club Atlético Peñarol

John Flowers (born June 13, 1989) is a retired American professional basketball player for Club Atlético Peñarol of the Liga Uruguaya de Básquetbol.

His mother Pam Kelly-Flowers is a member of the Women's Basketball Hall of Fame. As a senior at St. Mary's Ryken High School, he averaged 18 points and 13.2 rebounds. Flowers committed to coach John Beilein at West Virginia in college and honored his commitment after Beilein left. As a senior he averaged 9.2 points per game. He reached the Final Four with West Virginia in 2010. After graduating, Flowers played his first year of professional basketball in Japan.

On August 3, 2019, Flowers signed with Soles de Mexicali in Mexico. He averaged 13 points, 4 rebounds and 2 assists per game. Flowers signed with Boulazac on June 9, 2020. He averaged 13.5 points, 3.6 rebounds, and 1.1 assists per game. On September 1, 2021, Flowers signed with Club Atlético Peñarol of the Liga Uruguaya de Básquetbol.
