= 1988–89 Rutgers Scarlet Knights men's basketball team =

American college basketball season

1988–89 Rutgers Scarlet Knights men's basketball

Atlantic-10 tournament champions

NCAA tournament
- Conference: Atlantic-10 Conference
- Record: 18–13 (13–5 A-10)
- Head coach: Bob Wenzel (1st season)
- Assistant coach: Jeff Van Gundy (1st season)
- Home arena: Louis Brown Athletic Center

1988–89 Atlantic 10 men's basketball standings
	Conf.				Overall
Team	W		L	PCT	W		L	PCT
No. 17 West Virginia	17	–	1	.944	26	–	5	.839
Temple	15	–	3	.833	18	–	12	.600
Rutgers †	13	–	5	.722	18	–	13	.581
Penn State	12	–	6	.667	20	–	12	.625
Rhode Island	9	–	9	.500	13	–	15	.464
St. Bonaventure	7	–	11	.389	13	–	15	.464
Duquesne	7	–	11	.389	13	–	16	.448
UMass	5	–	13	.278	10	–	18	.357
Saint Joseph's	4	–	14	.222	8	–	21	.276
George Washington	1	–	17	.056	1	–	27	.036
† 1989 Atlantic 10 Tournament winner Rankings from AP Poll

The 1988–89 Rutgers Scarlet Knights men's basketball team represented Rutgers University in the 1988–89 NCAA Division I men's basketball season. The head coach was Bob Wenzel, then in his first season with the Scarlet Knights. The team played its home games in Louis Brown Athletic Center in Piscataway Township, New Jersey, and was a member of the Atlantic-10 Conference. The Scarlet Knights finished 3rd in the conference's regular season standings, and would win the Atlantic-10 tournament to earn an automatic bid to the NCAA tournament. Rutgers fell to Iowa, 87–73, in the opening round.

== Roster ==
1988–89 Rutgers Scarlet Knights men's basketball team
Players
Coaches

Pos.	#	Name	Height	Weight	Year	Hometown
G	13	Rick Dadika	6 ft 2 in (1.88 m)	185 lb (84 kg)	Jr	Elmwood Park, NJ
G		Tom Savage	6 ft 5 in (1.96 m)	—	So
SG	69	Eric Dimetrosky	6 ft 6 in (1.98 m)	210 lb (95 kg)	Fr
PG	23	Dan Baumlin	5 ft 8 in (1.73 m)	265 lb (120 kg)	So
PF	65	Dan Grentzman	6 ft 4 in (1.93 m)	155 lb (70 kg)	Sr
C	20	Ryan Callahan	5 ft 9 in (1.75 m)	195 lb (88 kg)
SF	5	P Santi	5 ft 11 in (1.8 m)	200 lb (91 kg)	So
G	4	Sean O'Neill	6 ft 0 in (1.83 m)	265 lb (120 kg)
PF	31	Keith Hughes (redshirt)	6 ft 8 in (2.03 m)	230 lb (104 kg)	Jr	Carteret, NJ
SG	24	Aedan Hill	6 ft 3 in (1.91 m)	265 lb (120 kg)	So
SG	3	JB Bennett	6 ft 1 in (1.85 m)	215 lb (98 kg)	So
G	7	Kevin Carino	5 ft 1 in (1.55 m)	135 lb (61 kg)	So
	5	Lav Laviano	6 ft 6 in (1.98 m)	235 lb (107 kg)	So

Head coach

- Bob Wenzel (Rutgers)

Assistant coach(es)

- Jeff Van Gundy

Legend

- (C) Team captain
- (S) Suspended
- (I) Ineligible
- (W) Walk-on
- Injured
- Current redshirt

== Schedule and results ==
Date time, TV	Rank^{#}	Opponent^{#}	Result	Record	Site (attendance) city, state
Regular season
Nov 25, 1988*		Rider	W 82–65	1–0	Louis Brown Athletic Center; Piscataway, New Jersey
Dec 3, 1988		UMass	W 78–61	2–0 (1–0)	Louis Brown Athletic Center; Piscataway, New Jersey
Dec 5, 1988*		Northwestern	L 69–75	2–1	Louis Brown Athletic Center; Piscataway, New Jersey
Dec 10, 1988		at George Washington	W 88–71	3–1 (2–0)	Charles E. Smith Center; Washington, D.C.
Dec 13, 1988*		at No. 17 Seton Hall	L 70–96	3–2	Brendan Byrne Arena; East Rutherford, New Jersey
Dec 17, 1988*		Princeton	W 69–63	4–2	Louis Brown Athletic Center; Piscataway, New Jersey
Dec 27, 1988*		No. 3 Syracuse	L 81–100	4–3	Louis Brown Athletic Center; Piscataway, New Jersey
Dec 30, 1988*		Lafayette	L 55–60	4–4	Louis Brown Athletic Center; Piscataway, New Jersey
Jan 3, 1989*		Miami (FL)	L 94–99	4–5	Louis Brown Athletic Center; Piscataway, New Jersey
Jan 5, 1989		Rhode Island	W 87–77	5–5 (3–0)	Louis Brown Athletic Center; Piscataway, New Jersey
Jan 10, 1989		at Temple	L 79–85	5–6 (3–1)	McGonigle Hall; Philadelphia, Pennsylvania
Jan 14, 1989		at West Virginia	L 70–90	5–7 (3–2)	WVU Coliseum; Morgantown, West Virginia
Jan 18, 1989*		vs. St. John's	L 61–62	5–8	Brendan Byrne Arena; East Rutherford, New Jersey
Jan 21, 1989		Duquesne	W 102–87	6–8 (4–2)	Louis Brown Athletic Center; Piscataway, New Jersey
Jan 24, 1989*		at Notre Dame	L 63–85	6–9	Joyce Center; Notre Dame, Indiana
Jan 28, 1989		at UMass	L 89–105	6–10 (4–3)	Curry Hicks Cage; Amherst, Massachusetts
Jan 30, 1989		St. Bonaventure	W 79–50	7–10 (5–3)	Louis Brown Athletic Center; Piscataway, New Jersey
Feb 2, 1989		Penn State	W 87–83	8–10 (6–3)	Louis Brown Athletic Center; Piscataway, New Jersey
Feb 5, 1989		No. 18 West Virginia	L 58–60	8–11 (6–4)	Louis Brown Athletic Center; Piscataway, New Jersey
Feb 9, 1989		at Duquesne	W 79–74	9–11 (7–4)	A.J. Palumbo Center; Pittsburgh, Pennsylvania
Feb 11, 1989		Saint Joseph's	W 91–55	10–11 (8–4)	Louis Brown Athletic Center; Piscataway, New Jersey
Feb 13, 1989		at Penn State	L 65–93	10–12 (8–5)	Rec Hall; University Park, Pennsylvania
Feb 18, 1989		George Washington	W 80–65	11–12 (9–5)	Louis Brown Athletic Center; Piscataway, New Jersey
Feb 20, 1989		at Saint Joseph's	W 76–74	12–12 (10–5)	Hagan Arena; Philadelphia, Pennsylvania
Feb 23, 1989		Temple	W 77–64	13–12 (11–5)	Louis Brown Athletic Center; Piscataway, New Jersey
Feb 25, 1989		at St. Bonaventure	W 83–80	14–12 (12–5)	Reilly Center; St. Bonaventure, New York
Mar 1, 1989		at Rhode Island	W 67–66	15–12 (13–5)	Keaney Gymnasium; Kingston, Rhode Island
Atlantic-10 tournament
Mar 5, 1989*		vs. St. Bonaventure; A-10 Tournament Quarterfinal	W 100–67	16–12	Palestra; Philadelphia, Pennsylvania
Mar 6, 1989*		at Temple; A-10 Tournament Semifinal	W 62–59	17–12	The Palestra; Philadelphia, Pennsylvania
Mar 9, 1989*		Penn State; A-10 tournament championship	W 70–66	18–12	Louis Brown Athletic Center; Piscataway, New Jersey
NCAA tournament
Mar 17, 1989*	(13 E)	vs. (4 E) No. 14 Iowa; First Round	L 73–87	18–13	Providence Civic Center; Providence, Rhode Island
*Non-conference game. ^{#}Rankings from AP Poll. (#) Tournament seedings in parentheses. All times are in Eastern Time.
