= 1983–84 West Virginia Mountaineers men's basketball team =

American college basketball season

1983–84 West Virginia Mountaineers men's basketball

Atlantic-10 Tournament champions

NCAA tournament, Second Round
- Conference: Atlantic-10 Conference
- Record: 20–12 (9–9 A-10)
- Head coach: Gale Catlett (6th season)
- Captains: Herbie Brooks; Darryl Prue
- Home arena: WVU Coliseum

1983–84 Atlantic 10 men's basketball standings
	Conf.				Overall
Team	W		L	PCT	W		L	PCT
No. 20 Temple	18	–	0	1.000	26	–	5	.839
Saint Joseph's	13	–	5	.722	20	–	9	.690
George Washington	11	–	7	.611	17	–	12	.586
West Virginia †	9	–	9	.500	20	–	12	.625
Rutgers	9	–	9	.500	15	–	13	.536
St. Bonaventure	8	–	10	.444	18	–	13	.581
Duquesne	8	–	10	.444	10	–	18	.357
UMass	6	–	12	.333	12	–	17	.414
Rhode Island	5	–	13	.278	6	–	22	.214
Penn State	3	–	15	.167	5	–	22	.185
† 1984 Atlantic 10 Tournament winner Rankings from AP Poll

The 1983–84 West Virginia Mountaineers men's basketball team represented West Virginia University as a member of the Atlantic-10 Conference during the 1983-84 season. The team played their home games at WVU Coliseum in Morgantown, West Virginia. Led by 6th-year head coach Gale Catlett, the Mountaineers won the conference tournament and received an automatic bid to the 1984 NCAA Tournament as No. 11 seed in the Mideast region. In the opening round, West Virginia knocked off No. 6 seed Oregon State. The season came to an abrupt end in the round of 32 with a 102–77 loss to No. 3 seed Maryland.

== Roster ==
1983–84 West Virginia Mountaineers men's basketball team
Players	Coaches
Pos. / # / Name / Height / Weight / Year / Hometown; F / 24 / Lester Rowe / 6 ft 5 in (1.96 m) / 195 lb (88 kg) / Jr / Buffalo, New York	Head coach: Gale Catlett; Assistant coach(es) Legend: (C) Team captain; (S) Suspended; (I) Ineligible; (W) Walk-on; Injured; Current redshirt

== Schedule and results ==
Date time, TV	Rank^{#}	Opponent^{#}	Result	Record	Site city, state
Regular Season
Nov 28, 1983*		Indiana (PA)	W 73–46	1–0	WVU Coliseum; Morgantown, West Virginia
Dec 3, 1983*		at Marshall rivalry	L 67–78	1–1	Cam Henderson Center; Huntington, West Virginia
Dec 7, 1983*		Robert Morris	W 72–62	2–1	WVU Coliseum; Morgantown, West Virginia
Dec 10, 1983*		at Nevada-Las Vegas	L 72–86	2–2	Thomas & Mack Center; Las Vegas, Nevada
Dec 17, 1983*		Pittsburgh	W 56–53	3–2	WVU Coliseum; Morgantown, West Virginia
Dec 22, 1983*		Seattle	W 77–60	4–2	WVU Coliseum; Morgantown, West Virginia
Jan 5, 1984*		George Washington	W 69–66	5–2	WVU Coliseum; Morgantown, West Virginia
Atlantic-10 Tournament
Mar 8, 1984*		Rutgers; Quarterfinals	W 93–73	17–11	WVU Coliseum; Morgantown, West Virginia
Mar 9, 1984*		No. 15 Temple; Semifinals	W 67–65	18–11	WVU Coliseum; Morgantown, West Virginia
Mar 10, 1984*		St. Bonaventure; Championship game	W 59–56	19–11	WVU Coliseum; Morgantown, West Virginia
NCAA Tournament
Mar 15, 1984*	(ME 11)	vs. (ME 6) No. 17 Oregon State; Second round	W 64–62	20–11	Birmingham-Jefferson Civic Center; Birmingham, Alabama
Mar 18, 1984*	(ME 11)	vs. (ME 3) No. 11 Maryland; Second round	L 77–102	20–12	Birmingham-Jefferson Civic Center; Birmingham, Alabama
*Non-conference game. ^{#}Rankings from AP Poll. (#) Tournament seedings in parentheses. ME=Mideast. All times are in Eastern.
