= 2006–07 West Virginia Mountaineers men's basketball team =

American college basketball season

2006–07 West Virginia Mountaineers men's basketball

NIT, Champions
- Conference: Big East Conference
- Record: 27–9 (9–7 Big East)
- Head coach: John Beilein (5th season)
- Home arena: WVU Coliseum

2006–07 Big East men's basketball standings
| | Conf. | | | | Overall |
| Team | W | | L | PCT | W | | L | PCT |
|---|---|---|---|---|---|---|---|---|
| No. 8 Georgetown † | 13 | – | 3 | .813 | 30 | – | 7 | .811 |
| No. 16 Louisville | 12 | – | 4 | .750 | 24 | – | 10 | .706 |
| No. 12 Pittsburgh | 12 | – | 4 | .750 | 29 | – | 8 | .784 |
| No. 17 Notre Dame | 11 | – | 5 | .688 | 24 | – | 8 | .750 |
| No. 20 Marquette | 10 | – | 6 | .625 | 24 | – | 10 | .706 |
| West Virginia | 9 | – | 7 | .563 | 27 | – | 9 | .750 |
| DePaul | 9 | – | 7 | .563 | 20 | – | 14 | .588 |
| Villanova | 9 | – | 7 | .563 | 22 | – | 11 | .667 |
| Providence | 8 | – | 8 | .500 | 18 | – | 13 | .581 |
| St. John's | 7 | – | 9 | .438 | 16 | – | 15 | .516 |
| Connecticut | 6 | – | 10 | .375 | 17 | – | 14 | .548 |
| *Seton Hall | 4 | – | 12 | .250 | 13 | – | 16 | .448 |
| *South Florida | 3 | – | 13 | .188 | 12 | – | 18 | .400 |
| *Rutgers | 3 | – | 13 | .188 | 10 | – | 19 | .345 |
| *Cincinnati | 2 | – | 14 | .125 | 11 | – | 19 | .367 |
| **Syracuse | 0 | – | 6 | .000 | 2 | – | 11 | .154 |
† 2007 Big East tournament winner As of April 2, 2007; Rankings from AP Poll; *Did not qualify for 2007 Big East tournament **Syracuse had 22 regular season games and two postseason games vacated due to sanctions against the program; Syracuse′s disputed record was 10–6, 24–11.

The 2006–07 West Virginia Mountaineers men's basketball team represented West Virginia University from Morgantown, West Virginia in the 2006-07 season. After impressive finishes in the Sweet Sixteen and Elite Eight the last two years, the Mountaineers seemed poised to improve on those last two seasons, opening with a 10-1 nonconference schedule. Only to post a 9-7 in Big East conference play, placing 7th. After a loss in the quarterfinals of the Big East tournament, the Mountaineers would accept an invitation to the National Invitation Tournament, where they would win the championship. Following the season, coach John Beilein would depart to become the next head coach at Michigan. Beilein would be replaced by Bob Huggins.

== Postseason Results ==
Big East conference Tournament
First Round Vs. Providence - W, 92-79 @ Madison Square Garden, New York, NY
Quarterfinals Vs. Louisville - L, 71-82 2OT @ Madison Square Garden, New York, NY
National Invitation Tournament
First Round Vs. Delaware State - W, 74-50 @ WVU Coliseum, Morgantown, WV
Second Round Vs. Massachusetts - W, 90-77 @ WVU Coliseum, Morgantown, WV
Quarterfinals Vs. NC State - W, 71-66 @ WVU Coliseum, Morgantown, WV
Semifinals Vs. Mississippi State - W, 63-62 @ Madison Square Garden, New York, NY
Championship Vs. Clemson - W, 78-73 @ Madison Square Garden, New York, NY
