= 1982–83 West Virginia Mountaineers men's basketball team =

American college basketball season

1982–83 West Virginia Mountaineers men's basketball

Atlantic-10 West division co-champions Atlantic-10 tournament champions

NCAA tournament, First Round
- Conference: Atlantic-10 Conference
- Record: 23–8 (10–4 A-10)
- Head coach: Gale Catlett (5th season)
- Home arena: WVU Coliseum

1982–83 Atlantic 10 men's basketball standings
	Conf.				Overall
Team	W		L	PCT	W		L	PCT
East
Rutgers	11	–	3	.786	23	–	8	.742
Saint Joseph's	8	–	6	.571	15	–	13	.536
Temple	5	–	9	.357	14	–	15	.483
UMass	4	–	10	.286	9	–	20	.310
Rhode Island	3	–	11	.214	9	–	19	.321
West
West Virginia †	10	–	4	.714	23	–	8	.742
St. Bonaventure	10	–	4	.714	20	–	10	.667
Penn State	9	–	5	.643	17	–	11	.607
Duquesne	6	–	8	.429	12	–	16	.429
George Washington	4	–	10	.286	14	–	15	.483
† 1983 Atlantic 10 Tournament winner Rankings from AP Poll

The 1982–83 West Virginia Mountaineers men's basketball team represented West Virginia University as a member of the Atlantic-10 Conference during the 1983-84 season. The team played their home games at WVU Coliseum in Morgantown, West Virginia. Led by 5th-year head coach Gale Catlett, the Mountaineers won the conference tournament and received an automatic bid to the 1983 NCAA tournament as No. 7 seed in the East region. In the opening round, West Virginia was beaten by No. 10 seed James Madison, 57–50.

== Roster ==
1982–83 West Virginia Mountaineers men's basketball team
Players
Coaches

Pos.	#	Name	Height	Weight	Year	Hometown
G		Greg Jones	6 ft 2 in (1.88 m)	190 lb (86 kg)	Sr	Youngstown, Ohio
F	24	Lester Rowe	6 ft 5 in (1.96 m)	195 lb (88 kg)	So	Buffalo, New York

Head coach

- Gale Catlett

Assistant coach(es)

Legend

- (C) Team captain
- (S) Suspended
- (I) Ineligible
- (W) Walk-on
- Injured
- Current redshirt

== Schedule and results ==
Date time, TV	Rank^{#}	Opponent^{#}	Result	Record	Site city, state
Regular season
Dec 11, 1982*		at Ohio State	W 69–67 ^{2OT}	5–0	St. John Arena; Columbus, Ohio
Jan 22, 1983		at Rutgers	W 71–63	11–5	Louis Brown Athletic Center; Piscataway, New Jersey
Feb 27, 1983*		No. 1 UNLV	W 87–78	19–6	WVU Coliseum; Morgantown, West Virginia
Atlantic-10 Tournament
Mar 9, 1983*		vs. Penn State; Quarterfinals	W 82–72	21–7	The Spectrum; Philadelphia, Pennsylvania
Mar 11, 1983*		vs. St. Bonaventure; Semifinals	W 86–62	22–7	The Spectrum; Philadelphia, Pennsylvania
Mar 12, 1983*		vs. Temple; Championship game	W 86–78	23–7	The Spectrum; Philadelphia, Pennsylvania
NCAA Tournament
Mar 17, 1983*	(7 E)	vs. (10 E) James Madison; First round	L 50–57	23–8	Greensboro Coliseum; Greensboro, North Carolina
*Non-conference game. ^{#}Rankings from AP poll. (#) Tournament seedings in parentheses. E=East. All times are in Eastern.

== Awards and honors ==
- Greg Jones – Atlantic 10 co-Player of the Year
