= 1988–89 West Virginia Mountaineers men's basketball team =

American college basketball season

1988–89 West Virginia Mountaineers men's basketball

Atlantic-10 Regular season champion

NCAA tournament, second round
- Conference: Atlantic-10 Conference

Ranking
- Coaches: No. 19
- AP: No. 17
- Record: 26–5 (17–1 A-10)
- Head coach: Gale Catlett (11th season)
- Captains: Herbie Brooks; Darryl Prue
- Home arena: WVU Coliseum

1988–89 Atlantic 10 men's basketball standings
	Conf.				Overall
Team	W		L	PCT	W		L	PCT
No. 17 West Virginia	17	–	1	.944	26	–	5	.839
Temple	15	–	3	.833	18	–	12	.600
Rutgers †	13	–	5	.722	18	–	13	.581
Penn State	12	–	6	.667	20	–	12	.625
Rhode Island	9	–	9	.500	13	–	15	.464
St. Bonaventure	7	–	11	.389	13	–	15	.464
Duquesne	7	–	11	.389	13	–	16	.448
UMass	5	–	13	.278	10	–	18	.357
Saint Joseph's	4	–	14	.222	8	–	21	.276
George Washington	1	–	17	.056	1	–	27	.036
† 1989 Atlantic 10 Tournament winner Rankings from AP Poll

The 1988–89 West Virginia Mountaineers men's basketball team represented West Virginia University as a member of the Atlantic-10 Conference during the 1988-89 season. The team played their home games at WVU Coliseum in Morgantown, West Virginia. Led by 11th-year head coach Gale Catlett, the Mountaineers won 22 consecutive games, took home the conference regular season title, and received an at-large bid to the 1989 NCAA tournament as #7 seed in the East region.

== Roster ==
1988–89 West Virginia Mountaineers men's basketball team
Players
Coaches

Pos.	#	Name	Height	Weight	Year	Hometown
G	3	Tracy Shelton	6 ft 0 in (1.83 m)	170 lb (77 kg)	Fr	Oak Hill, West Virginia
G	4	Steve Berger	5 ft 11 in (1.8 m)	170 lb (77 kg)	Jr	Boomer, West Virginia
G	11	Chris Leonard	6 ft 4 in (1.93 m)	185 lb (84 kg)	Fr	Purcellville, Virginia
G	14	Rob Samuel	6 ft 5 in (1.96 m)	190 lb (86 kg)	So	Dallas, Texas
G	20	Anthony Williams	6 ft 6 in (1.98 m)	190 lb (86 kg)	Fr	College Park, Georgia
G	21	Shaun Jackson	6 ft 4 in (1.93 m)	185 lb (84 kg)	So	Jacksonville, Florida
F	22	Chris Rupp	6 ft 7 in (2.01 m)	210 lb (95 kg)	Jr	Lexington, Kentucky
F	23	Chris Berger	6 ft 6 in (1.98 m)	215 lb (98 kg)	So	Bronx, New York
F	24	Darryl Prue	6 ft 7 in (2.01 m)	225 lb (102 kg)	Sr	Washington, D.C.
F	25	Mike Yoest	6 ft 7 in (2.01 m)	210 lb (95 kg)	So	Pittsburgh, Pennsylvania
G	30	Tim McNeely	6 ft 3 in (1.91 m)	175 lb (79 kg)	Fr	Chapmanville, West Virginia
G	32	Herbie Brooks	6 ft 2 in (1.88 m)	180 lb (82 kg)	Sr	Mullens, West Virginia
F/C	33	Wade Smith	6 ft 10 in (2.08 m)	210 lb (95 kg)	Sr	Saint John, U.S. Virgin Islands
C	42	Ray Foster	6 ft 10 in (2.08 m)	240 lb (109 kg)	Sr	Cleveland, Ohio
F	50	Steve Hardwick	6 ft 8 in (2.03 m)	215 lb (98 kg)	Fr	Detroit, Michigan
C	55	Matt Roadcap	6 ft 9 in (2.06 m)	210 lb (95 kg)	Fr	Millersburg, Pennsylvania

Head coach

- Gale Catlett

Assistant coach(es)

Legend

- (C) Team captain
- (S) Suspended
- (I) Ineligible
- (W) Walk-on
- Injured
- Current redshirt

== Schedule and results ==
Date time, TV	Rank^{#}	Opponent^{#}	Result	Record	Site city, state
Regular Season
Nov 26, 1988*		Robert Morris	L 67–75	0–1	WVU Coliseum; Morgantown, West Virginia
Dec 1, 1988*		Fresno State	W 71–67	1–1	WVU Coliseum; Morgantown, West Virginia
Dec 3, 1988*		Bradley	L 68–70	1–2	WVU Coliseum; Morgantown, West Virginia
Dec 5, 1988*		Mount St. Mary's	W 77–60	2–2	WVU Coliseum; Morgantown, West Virginia
Dec 10, 1988*		at Pittsburgh	W 84–81 ^{OT}	3–2	Fitzgerald Field House; Pittsburgh, Pennsylvania
Dec 17, 1988*		Virginia Tech	W 101–52	4–2	WVU Coliseum; Morgantown, West Virginia
Dec 22, 1988*		at UNC Charlotte	W 82–73 ^{OT}	5–2	Bojangles Coliseum; Charlotte, North Carolina
Dec 27, 1988*		at Maryland	W 69–61	6–2	Cole Fieldhouse; College Park, Maryland
Jan 3, 1989		at UMass	W 89–73	7–2 (1–0)	Springfield Civic Center; Springfield, Massachusetts
Jan 5, 1989		St. Bonaventure	W 69–45	8–2 (2–0)	WVU Coliseum; Morgantown, West Virginia
Jan 7, 1989		Duquesne	W 101–72	9–2 (3–0)	WVU Coliseum; Morgantown, West Virginia
Jan 10, 1989		at Saint Joseph's	W 76–61	10–2 (4–0)	Hagan Arena; Philadelphia, Pennsylvania
Jan 14, 1989		Rutgers	W 90–70	11–2 (5–0)	WVU Coliseum; Morgantown, West Virginia
Jan 17, 1989		at George Washington	W 73–71	12–2 (6–0)	Charles E. Smith Center; Washington, D.C.
Jan 21, 1989		Temple	W 65–63	13–2 (7–0)	WVU Coliseum; Morgantown, West Virginia
Jan 26, 1989		George Washington	W 92–57	14–2 (8–0)	WVU Coliseum; Morgantown, West Virginia
Jan 28, 1989		at Duquesne	W 98–82	15–2 (9–0)	A.J. Palumbo Center; Pittsburgh, Pennsylvania
Feb 2, 1989	No. 18	at Rhode Island	W 79–71	16–2 (10–0)	Keaney Gymnasium; Kingston, Rhode Island
Feb 5, 1989	No. 18	at Rutgers	W 60–58	17–2 (11–0)	Louis Brown Athletic Center; Piscataway, New Jersey
Feb 9, 1989*	No. 15	vs. Marshall	W 81–73	18–2	Charleston Civic Center; Charleston, West Virginia
Feb 11, 1989	No. 15	Penn State	W 100–67	19–2 (12–0)	WVU Coliseum; Morgantown, West Virginia
Feb 13, 1989*	No. 15	at St. Bonaventure	W 80–72	20–2 (13–0)	Reilly Center; St. Bonaventure, New York
Feb 16, 1989*	No. 14	UMass	W 88–55	21–2 (14–0)	WVU Coliseum; Morgantown, West Virginia
Feb 19, 1989*	No. 14	Rhode Island	W 90–66	22–2 (15–0)	WVU Coliseum; Morgantown, West Virginia
Feb 23, 1989	No. 11	Saint Joseph's	W 65–50	23–2 (16–0)	WVU Coliseum; Morgantown, West Virginia
Feb 26, 1989	No. 11	at Temple	L 56–74	23–3 (16–1)	McGonigle Hall; Philadelphia, Pennsylvania
Mar 1, 1989	No. 15	at Penn State	W 71–61	24–3 (17–1)	Rec Hall; University Park, Pennsylvania
Atlantic-10 Tournament
Mar 5, 1989*	No. 15	vs. Saint Joseph's; A-10 Tournament Quarterfinals	W 79–59	25–3	Palestra; Philadelphia, Pennsylvania
Mar 6, 1989*	No. 15	vs. Penn State; A-10 Tournament Semifinals	L 64–86	25–4	Palestra; Philadelphia, Pennsylvania
NCAA Tournament
Mar 16, 1989*	(7 E) No. 17	vs. (10 E) Tennessee; First Round	W 84–68	26–4	Greensboro Coliseum; Greensboro, North Carolina
Mar 18, 1989*	(7 E) No. 17	vs. (2 E) No. 9 Duke; Second Round	L 63–70	26–5	Greensboro Coliseum; Greensboro, North Carolina
*Non-conference game. ^{#}Rankings from AP Poll. (#) Tournament seedings in parentheses. E=East. All times are in Eastern.
