= Terence Stansbury =

American-French basketball player and coach

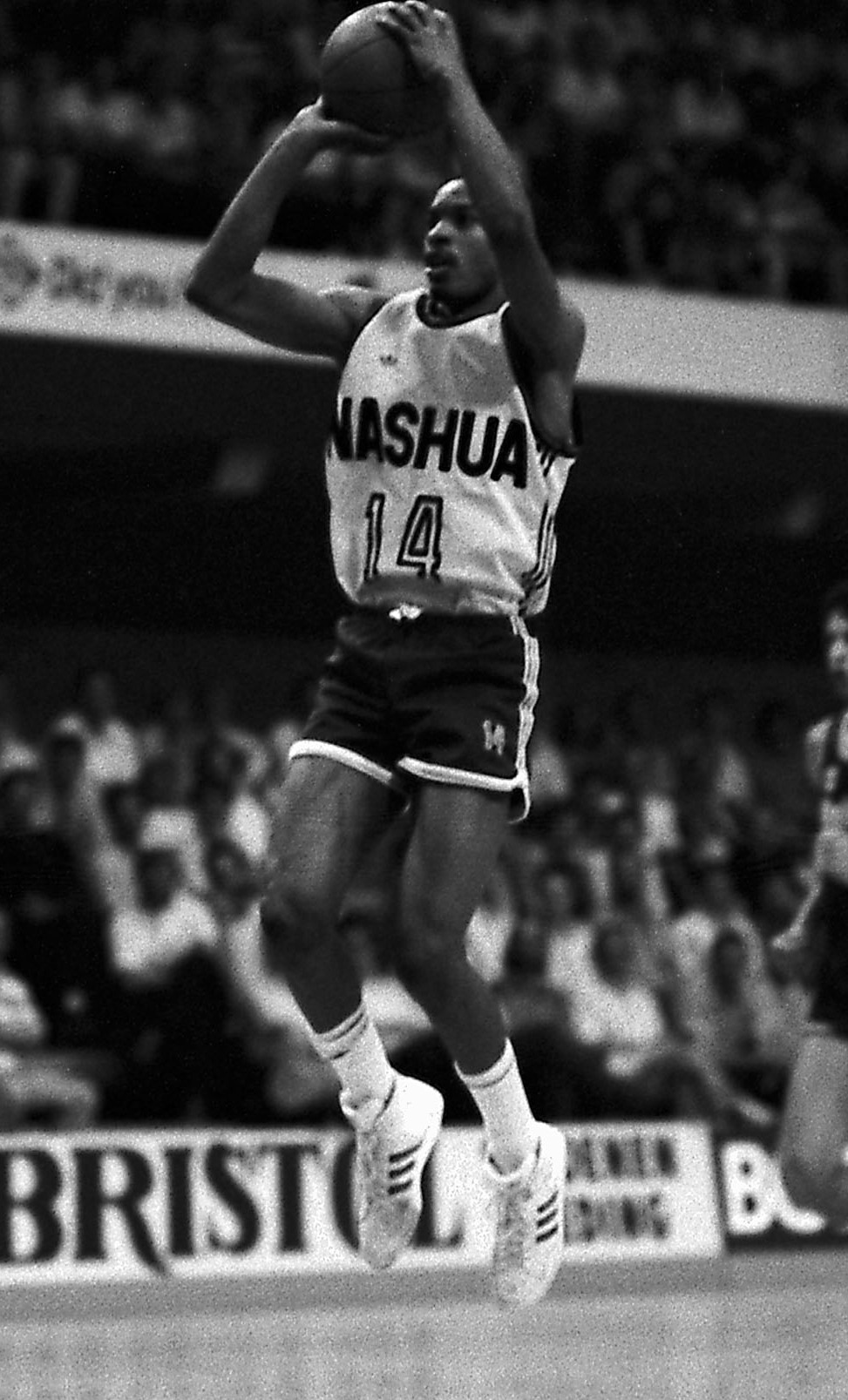
- Stansbury in 1988

Personal information
- Born: February 27, 1961 (age 65) Wilmington, Delaware, U.S.
- Listed height: 6 ft 5 in (1.96 m)
- Listed weight: 170 lb (77 kg)

Career information
- High school: Newark (Newark, Delaware)
- College: Temple (1980–1984)
- NBA draft: 1984: 1st round, 15th overall pick
- Drafted by: Dallas Mavericks
- Playing career: 1984–2003
- Position: Shooting guard
- Number: 43, 44, 14
- Coaching career: 2003–2014

Career history

Playing
- 1984–1986: Indiana Pacers
- 1986–1987: Seattle SuperSonics
- 1987–1988: EBBC Den Bosch
- 1988: Wyoming Wildcatters
- 1988–1989: Maccabi Brussels
- 1989–1995: Levallois
- 1996–1997: Bnei Herzliya
- 1997: Florida Sharks
- 1997–1998: AEK Athens
- 1998–1999: Le Mans
- 1999–2000: SIG Strasbourg
- 2000: Houthalen
- 2000–2001: Hasselt BT
- 2001–2003: BSW

Coaching
- 2003–2004: Jyväskylä BC
- 2004–2005: Huima Äänekoski
- 2005–2006: Basket Racing Luxembourg
- 2006–2007: Black Star Mersch
- 2007–2008: AS Soleuvre
- 2008–2009: Rotterdam Challengers
- 2009–2010: BSW (assistant)
- 2010–2011: BSW
- 2013: Lapua Korikobri
- 2013–2014: Résidence Walferdange

Career highlights
- French League Best Scorer (1993); French 2nd Division Foreign Player's MVP (1992); Dutch League All-Star (1988); Third-team All-American – NABC (1984); Atlantic 10 Player of the Year (1984); First-team All-Atlantic 10 (1984); Second-team All-Atlantic 10 (1983); Robert V. Geasey Trophy (1983)
- Stats at NBA.com
- Stats at Basketball Reference

Terence Rudolph Stansbury (born February 27, 1961) is an American-French former professional basketball player and coach. At a height of 6 ft 5 in (1.96 m) tall, he played at the shooting guard position.

== College career ==
Stansbury, a graduate of Newark High School, played college basketball for the Temple Owls. As a junior, he averaged 24.6 points for the Owls and 18.6 points as a senior. Stansbury starred at Temple from 1980 to 1984, scoring a total of 1,811 points (15.7 points per game).

== Professional career ==
Stansbury played three seasons (1984–1987) in the National Basketball Association (NBA), as a member of the Indiana Pacers and Seattle SuperSonics. He finished with 1,200 points in his career, and was a three-time participant in the NBA Slam Dunk Contest, where he won three straight third-place positions in a row, from 1985 to 1987, before leaving the NBA.

He later spent six seasons at Levallois in France. Stansbury was granted French citizenship. In the 1992–93 season, he led the French ProA league in scoring (26.3 points per contest).

== Career statistics ==
Legend
GP	Games played	GS	Games started	MPG	Minutes per game
FG%	Field goal percentage	3P%	3-point field goal percentage	FT%	Free throw percentage
RPG	Rebounds per game	APG	Assists per game	SPG	Steals per game
BPG	Blocks per game	PPG	Points per game	**Bold**	Career high

=== NBA ===
==== Regular season ====
Year	Team	GP	GS	MPG	FG%	3P%	FT%	RPG	APG	SPG	BPG	PPG
1984–85	Indiana	**74**	14	17.3	**.459**	.160	.810	1.5	1.7	.6	**.2**	**7.1**
1985–86	Indiana	**74**	**17**	**18.0**	.433	.170	**.811**	**1.9**	**2.8**	**.8**	.1	6.7
1986–87	Seattle	44	0	8.5	.429	**.379**	.620	.5	1.3	.3	.0	4.0
Career		192	31	15.5	.444	.224	.779	1.4	2.0	.6	.1	6.3

== Honors ==
He was inducted into the Delaware Sports Hall of Fame in 2010.

== Personal life ==
His daughter Tiffany Stansbury played in the WNBA.
