= Rutgers Scarlet Knights men's basketball statistical leaders =

The Rutgers Scarlet Knights men's basketball statistical leaders are individual statistical leaders of the Rutgers Scarlet Knights men's basketball program in various categories, including points, three-pointers, assists, blocks, rebounds, and steals. Within those areas, the lists identify single-game, single-season, and career leaders. The Scarlet Knights represent Rutgers University in the NCAA's Big Ten Conference.

Rutgers began competing in intercollegiate basketball in 1906. However, the school's record book does not generally list records from before the 1950s, as records from before this period are often incomplete and inconsistent. Since scoring was much lower in this era, and teams played much fewer games during a typical season, it is likely that few or no players from this era would appear on these lists anyway.

The NCAA did not officially record assists as a stat until the 1983–84 season, and blocks and steals until the 1985–86 season, but Rutgers's record books includes players in these stats before these seasons. These lists are updated through the end of the 2022–23 season.

== Scoring ==
Career
Rk	Player	Points	Seasons
1	Phil Sellers	2,399	1972–73 1973–74 1974–75 1975–76
2	Bob Lloyd	2,045	1964–65 1965–66 1966–67
3	James Bailey	2,034	1975–76 1976–77 1977–78 1978–79
4	Mike Dabney	1,902	1972–73 1973–74 1974–75 1975–76
5	Hollis Copeland	1,769	1974–75 1975–76 1976–77 1977–78
6	Quincy Douby	1,690	2003–04 2004–05 2005–06
7	Myles Mack	1,658	2011–12 2012–13 2013–14 2014–15
8	Geo Baker	1,654	2017–18 2018–19 2019–20 2020–21 2021–22
9	Eddie Jordan	1,632	1973–74 1974–75 1975–76 1976–77
10	Eric Riggins	1,604	1983–84 1984–85 1985–86 1986–87

Season
Rk	Player	Points	Season
1	Quincy Douby	839	2005–06
2	Bob Lloyd	809	1966–67
3	James Bailey	730	1977–78
4	Eric Riggins	692	1986–87
5	Phil Sellers	657	1974–75
6	Keith Hughes	649	1989–90
7	Bob Lloyd	635	1965–66
8	Phil Sellers	634	1975–76
9	Mike Dabney	629	1975–76
10	Tom Savage	621	1988–89

Single game
Rk	Player	Points	Season	Opponent
1	Eric Riggins	51	1986–87	Penn State
	Bob Lloyd	51	1965–66	Delaware
3	Bob Greacen	46	1968–69	Colgate
4	Bob Lloyd	45	1966–67	Glassboro State
5	Bob Lloyd	44	1966–67	Marshall
6	James Bailey	43	1977–78	William & Mary
	Phil Sellers	43	1973–74	USC
8	Bob Lloyd	42	1966–67	Utah State
9	Quincy Douby	41	2005–06	Syracuse
10	Keith Hughes	40	1990–91	Penn State
	Phil Sellers	40	1973–74	Columbia
	Bob Lloyd	40	1965–66	Penn State
	Bucky Hatchett	40	1947–48	Bucknell

== Rebounds ==
Career
Rk	Player	Rebounds	Seasons
1	Phil Sellers	1111	1972–73 1973–74 1974–75 1975–76
2	James Bailey	1074	1975–76 1976–77 1977–78 1978–79
3	Swede Sundstrom	942	1951–52 1952–53 1953–54
4	Clifford Omoruyi	933	2020–21 2021–22 2022–23 2023–24
5	Rashod Kent	910	1998–99 1999–00 2000–01 2001–02
6	Roy Hinson	860	1979–80 1980–81 1981–82 1982–83
7	Hollis Copeland	850	1974–75 1975–76 1976–77 1977–78
8	Gene Armstead	800	1970–71 1971–72 1972–73
9	Dane Miller	741	2009–10 2010–11 2011–12 2012–13
10	Don Petersen	719	1960–61 1961–62 1962–63

Season
Rk	Player	Rebounds	Season
1	Swede Sundstrom	494	1953–54
2	Don Peterson	389	1962–63
3	Swede Sundstrom	364	1952–53
4	Hal Corizzi	339	1950–51
5	Phil Sellers	337	1975–76
6	Clifford Omoruyi	325	2022–23
7	Rashod Kent	317	2001–02
8	Karol Strelecki	310	1958–59
9	James Bailey	304	1976–77
10	Gene Armstead	295	1971–72

Single game
Rk	Player	Rebounds	Season	Opponent
1	Swede Sundstrom	30	1953–54	Army
2	Swede Sundstrom	30	1952–53	Johns Hopkins
3	Swede Sundstrom	28	1953–54	Lehigh
4	Don Peterson	27	1962–63	BU
	Swede Sundstrom	27	1953–54	UConn
	Swede Sundstrom	27	1953–54	Delaware
7	Don Peterson	26	1962–63	Lehigh
	Swede Sundstrom	26	1953–54	Brandeis
	Swede Sundstrom	26	1952–53	UConn
	Swede Sundstrom	26	1952–53	Haverford

== Assists ==
Career
Rk	Player	Assists	Seasons
1	Eddie Jordan	585	1973–74 1974–75 1975–76 1976–77
2	Geo Baker	496	2017–18 2018–19 2019–20 2020–21 2021–22
3	Brian Ellerbe	495	1981–82 1982–83 1983–84 1984–85
4	Paul Mulcahy	457	2019–20 2020–21 2021–22 2022–23
5	Geoff Billet	428	1995–96 1996–97 1997–98 1998–99
6	Myles Mack	425	2011–12 2012–13 2013–14 2014–15
7	Anthony Farmer	371	2005–06 2006–07 2007–08 2008–09
8	Mike Coburn	367	2007–08 2008–09 2009–10 2010–11
9	Damon Santiago	350	1991–92 1992–93 1994–95 1995–96
10	Corey Sanders	328	2015–16 2016–17 2017–18

Season
Rk	Player	Assists	Season
1	Eddie Jordan	202	1976–77
2	Eddie Jordan	174	1975–76
3	Rodney Duncan	169	1977–78
	Paul Mulcahy	169	2021–22
5	Rich Brunson	152	1982–83
6	Brian Ellerbe	149	1984–85
7	Paul Mulcahy	147	2022–23
8	Myles Mack	142	2013–14
9	Tom Brown	141	1978–79
10	Brian Ellerbe	139	1983–84

Single game
Rk	Player	Assists	Season	Opponent
1	Brian Ellerbe	16	1984–85	NC State
2	Brian Ellerbe	14	1984–85	Geo Wash
	John McFadden	14	1970–71	West Virginia
4	Paul Mulcahy	13	2022–23	Iowa
	Albert Karner	13	1994–95	Geo Wash
	Rodney Duncan	13	1977–78	Georgetown
	Eddie Jordan	13	1976–77	Geo Wash
8	Eddie Jordan	12	1976–77	Boston College
	Eddie Jordan	12	1976–77	Pittsburgh
	Rodney Duncan	12	1977–78	Texas
	Brian Ellerbe	12	1983–84	Seton Hall
	Earl Johnson	12	1997–98	Loyola
	Corey Sanders	12	2015–16	Illinois
	Paul Mulcahy	12	2021–22	Michigan State
	Paul Mulcahy	12	2022–23	Nebraska
	Dylan Harper	12	2024–25	Columbia

== Steals ==
Career
Rk	Player	Steals	Seasons
1	Caleb McConnell	221	2018–19 2019–20 2020–21 2021–22 2022–23
2	Eddie Jordan	220	1973–74 1974–75 1975–76 1976–77
3	Myles Mack	211	2011–12 2012–13 2013–14 2014–15
4	Rashod Kent	189	1998–99 1999–00 2000–01 2001–02
5	Geo Baker	180	2017–18 2018–19 2019–20 2020–21 2021–22
6	James Bailey	178	1975–76 1976–77 1977–78 1978–79
7	Rob Hodgson	176	1995–96 1996–97 1997–98 1998–99
8	Mike Jones	175	1989–90 1990–91 1991–92 1992–93
9	Rick Dadika	159	1985–86 1986–87 1987–988 1988–89 1989–90
10	Kelvin Troy	144	1977–78 1978–79 1979–80 1980–81

Season
Rk	Player	Steals	Season
1	Mike Dabney	111	1975–76
2	Eddie Jordan	104	1975–76
3	Eddie Jordan	94	1976–77
4	Rick Dadika	77	1988–89
5	Caleb McConnell	71	2022–23
6	Caleb McConnell	70	2021–22
7	Cam Spencer	69	2022–23
8	Steve Worthy	62	1992–93
	Phil Sellers	62	1975–76
10	Jerome Coleman	59	2001–02

Single game
Rk	Player	Steals	Season	Opponent
1	Mike Dabney	9	1975–76	Navy
	Mike Dabney	9	1975–76	Lafayette
	Eddie Jordan	9	1973–74	Penn State
4	Myles Mack	8	2014–15	St. Francis-Brooklyn
5	Mike Jones	7	1990–91	West Virginia
	Daryl Smith	7	1990–91	Missouri
7	Dylan Harper	6	2024–25	USC
	Caleb McConnell	6	2022–23	Northwestern
	Cam Spencer	6	2022–23	Columbia
	Caleb McConnell	6	2021–22	Wisconsin
	Caleb McConnell	6	2021–22	UMass
	Corey Sanders	6	2016–17	Hartford
	Corey Sanders	6	2015–16	Minnesota
	Myles Mack	6	2013–14	Florida A&M
	Corey Chandler	6	2007–08	Saint Peter's
	Jerome Coleman	6	2002–03	Prairie View A&M
	Albert Karner	6	1994–95	Wagner
	Steve Worthy	6	1991–92	Massachusetts
	Steve Worthy	6	1991–92	Arizona
	Kelvin Troy	6	1980–81	Manhattan
	Kelvin Troy	6	1980–81	Duquesne
	Eddie Jordan	6	1976–77	Massachusetts
	Eddie Jordan	6	1976–77	Duquesne
	Eddie Jordan	6	1976–77	Penn State
	Phil Sellers	6	1975–76	American
	Phil Sellers	6	1975–76	Bucknell
	Eddie Jordan	6	1976–77	Manhattan
	Eddie Jordan	6	1975–76	VMI
	Eddie Jordan	6	1975–76	Syracuse
	Eddie Jordan	6	1975–76	West Virginia
	Mike Dabney	6	1975–76	UCLA
	Mike Dabney	6	1975–76	Delaware
	Mike Dabney	6	1975–76	Stetson
	Mike Dabney	6	1975–76	Temple
	Eddie Jordan	6	1975–76	Temple
	John McFadden	6	1970–71	Lafayette

== Blocks ==
Career
Rk	Player	Blocks	Seasons
1	Hamady Ndiaye	358	2006–07 2007–08 2008–09 2009–10
2	Roy Hinson	355	1979–80 1980–81 1981–82 1982–83
3	James Bailey	304	1975–76 1976–77 1977–78 1978–79
4	Herve Lamizana	254	2001–02 2002–03 2003–04
5	Chuck Weiler	246	1990–91 1991–92 1992–93 1993–94
6	Clifford Omoruyi	221	2020–21 2021–22 2022–23 2023–24
7	Eric Clark	183	1994–95 1995–96 1996–97 1997–98
8	Dane Miller	162	2009–10 2010–11 2011–12 2012–13
9	Myles Johnson	138	2018–19 2019–20 2020–21
10	Steve Perry	115	1983–84 1984–85

Season
Rk	Player	Blocks	Season
1	Hamady Ndiaye	145	2009–10
2	Roy Hinson	144	1982–83
3	Herve Lamizana	102	2003–04
4	Chuck Weiler	94	1991–92
	James Bailey	94	1975–76
6	Hamady Ndiaye	93	2007–08
	Clifford Omoruyi	93	2023–24
8	Herve Lamizana	83	2002–03
9	Gregory Echenique	78	2008–09
	Roy Hinson	78	1981–82

Single game
Rk	Player	Blocks	Season	Opponent
1	Roy Hinson	11	1982–83	Stanford
2	Hamady Ndiaye	10	2009–10	St. Peter's
	Chuck Weiler	10	1991–92	St. Bonaventure
	Roy Hinson	10	1982–83	Rhode Island
	Roy Hinson	10	1982–83	Geo Wash
	Roy Hinson	10	1982–83	Oregon
7	Hamady Ndiaye	9	2009–10	St. John's
	Hamady Ndiaye	9	2009–10	N.J.I.T.
	Roy Hinson	9	1982–83	C.W. Post
	Gene Armstead	9	1970–71	Lafayette
