= Tom Young (basketball) =

American basketball coach (1932–2022)

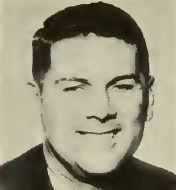
- Photo of Young from the 1968–69 Maryland basketball media guide

Biographical details
- Born: September 17, 1932; Natrona Heights, Pennsylvania, U.S.
- Died: March 20, 2022 (aged 89); Virginia Beach, Virginia, U.S.

Playing career
- 1952–1953; 1957–1958: Maryland

Coaching career (HC unless noted)
- 1958–1967: Catholic University
- 1967–1969: Maryland (assistant)
- 1969–1973: American
- 1973–1985: Rutgers
- 1985–1991: Old Dominion
- 2003–2007: Washington Wizards (assistant)

Head coaching record
- Overall: 524–328 (.615)
- Tournaments: 6–6 (NCAA Division I); 4–5 (NIT); 0–1 (NCAA College Division)

Accomplishments and honors

Championships
- Mason–Dixon tournament (1964); 2 ECAC tournament (1975, 1976); 4 Atlantic 10 regular season (1977, 1978, 1980, 1983); Atlantic 10 tournament (1979); Sun Belt regular season (1986)

Awards
- Sporting News Men's College Basketball Coach of the Year Award (1976); UPI Coach of the Year (1976); Sun Belt Coach of the Year (1986)

Thomas Joseph Young (September 17, 1932 – March 20, 2022) was an American basketball coach. He coached at American University, Rutgers University, Catholic University and Old Dominion University.

== Early life and education ==
Born in Natrona Heights, Pennsylvania, Young attended the University of Maryland, where he played on the basketball team, graduating in 1958. Young interrupted his college career for a 19-month tour of duty in Germany for the United States Army after the 1952–53 season. In 2003, the University of Maryland Athletic Hall of Fame inducted him into its ranks.

== Coaching career ==
After graduating from Maryland in 1958, Young became head coach at the Catholic University of America. In nine seasons, Young went 134–88 at Catholic. From 1967 to 1969, Young was an assistant coach at his alma mater Maryland.

Young then was head coach at American University from 1969 to 1973 and Rutgers from 1973 to 1985. At Rutgers, Young's 1976 Scarlet Knights had an undefeated regular season record and advanced to the NCAA Final Four. Young also served as an assistant coach for the Washington Wizards of the National Basketball Association under Head Coach Eddie Jordan, who was the starting point guard on the 1976 Rutgers team. Under Young's tutelage, Phil Sellers, James Bailey, and Jordan evolved into All-Americans and went on to play in the NBA.

From 1985 to 1991, Young was head coach at Old Dominion. He led Old Dominion to the 1986 NCAA tournament in his first season, but this would be one of just two postseason tournaments in his six-year tenure. Old Dominion fired Young on March 7, 1991. Two months earlier, Old Dominion suspended Young two games for an incident caught on camera where Young and several Old Dominion players chased a Western Kentucky player towards the locker room after a 77–74 loss to Western Kentucky.

After leaving Old Dominion in 1991, Young became a television analyst for Atlantic 10 Conference broadcasts. On June 25, 2003, Washington Wizards head coach Eddie Jordan added Young to his coaching staff. After four seasons with the Wizards, Young retired from coaching on June 13, 2007.

== Death ==
Young died at a hospital in Virginia Beach, Virginia on March 20, 2022.

== Head coaching record ==
Record table
Season	Team	Overall	Conference	Standing	Postseason
Catholic University Cardinals (Mason–Dixon Conference) (1958–1967)
1958–59	Catholic University	15–6	10–5	5th	
1959–60	Catholic University	12–12	7–6		
1960–61	Catholic University	16–7			
1961–62	Catholic University	17–7			
1962–63	Catholic University	16–11			
1963–64	Catholic University	16–12			NCAA College Regional Fourth Place
1964–65	Catholic University	15–9	9–2		
1965–66	Catholic University	14–13			
1966–67	Catholic University	13–11	7–3		
Catholic University:		134–88			
American Eagles (Middle Atlantic Conference) (1969–1973)
1969–70	American	11–12	2–3	T–3rd (Eastern)	
1970–71	American	13–12	2–4	5th (Eastern)	
1971–72	American	16–8	3–3	3rd (Eastern)	
1972–73	American	21–5	4–2	3rd (Eastern)	NIT first round
American:		61–37	11–12		
Rutgers Scarlet Knights (NCAA Division I independent) (1973–1976)
1973–74	Rutgers	18–8			
1974–75	Rutgers	22–7			NCAA Division I first round
1975–76	Rutgers	31–2			NCAA Division I Final Four
Rutgers Scarlet Knights (East Coast Basketball League/Eastern Athletic Association/Atlantic 10 Conference) (1976–1985)
1976–77	Rutgers	18–10	7–1	1st (East)	NIT first round
1977–78	Rutgers	24–7	7–3	T–1st	NIT Third Place
1978–79	Rutgers	22–9	7–3	T–2nd	NCAA Division I second round
1979–80	Rutgers	14–14	7–3	T–1st	
1980–81	Rutgers	16–14	7–6	5th	
1981–82	Rutgers	20–10	9–5	2nd	NIT second round
1982–83	Rutgers	23–8	11–3	1st (East)	NCAA Division I second round
1983–84	Rutgers	15–13	9–9	T–4th	
1984–85	Rutgers	16–14	9–9	T–4th	
Rutgers:		239–116	73–42		
Old Dominion Monarchs (Sun Belt Conference) (1985–1991)
1985–86	Old Dominion	23–8	11–3	1st	NCAA Division I second round
1986–87	Old Dominion	6–22	1–13	8th	
1987–88	Old Dominion	18–12	9–5	3rd	NIT first round
1988–89	Old Dominion	15–13	7–7	5th	
1989–90	Old Dominion	14–14	7–7	T–3rd	
1990–91	Old Dominion	14–18	5–9	6th	
Old Dominion:		90–87	40–44		
Total:		524–238			
National champion Postseason invitational champion Conference regular season champion Conference regular season and conference tournament champion Division regular season champion Division regular season and conference tournament champion Conference tournament champion

== See also ==
- List of NCAA Division I Men's Final Four appearances by coach
