= 1978–79 Rutgers Scarlet Knights men's basketball team =

American college basketball season

1978–79 Rutgers Scarlet Knights men's basketball

EAA tournament champion

NCAA tournament, Sweet Sixteen
- Conference: Eastern Athletic Association

Ranking
- AP: No. 18
- Record: 22–9 (7–3 EAA)
- Head coach: Tom Young (6th season)
- Assistant coaches: Joe Boylan; John McFadden; Art Perry
- Home arena: Louis Brown Athletic Center

1978–79 Eastern 8 men's basketball standings
	Conf.				Overall
Team	W		L	PCT	W		L	PCT
Villanova	9	–	1	.900	13	–	13	.500
No. 18 Rutgers †	7	–	3	.700	22	–	9	.710
West Virginia	7	–	3	.700	16	–	12	.571
Pittsburgh	6	–	4	.600	18	–	11	.621
George Washington	5	–	5	.500	13	–	14	.481
Penn State	4	–	6	.400	12	–	18	.400
Duquesne	2	–	8	.200	13	–	13	.500
UMass	0	–	10	.000	5	–	22	.185
† 1979 Eastern 8 Tournament winner Rankings from AP Poll

The 1978–79 Rutgers Scarlet Knights men's basketball team represented Rutgers University as a member of the Eastern Athletic Association during the 1978–79 NCAA Division I men's basketball season. The head coach was Tom Young, then in his sixth season with the Scarlet Knights. The team played its home games in Louis Brown Athletic Center in Piscataway, New Jersey. The Scarlet Knights won the EAA tournament to reach the NCAA tournament, where they defeated Georgetown in the second round to reach the Sweet Sixteen. Rutgers would lose to St. John's – a team they beat twice during the regular season – in the East Regional semifinal to finish with a record of 22–9 (7–3 EAA).

== Roster ==
1978–79 Rutgers Scarlet Knights men's basketball team
Players
Coaches

Pos.	#	Name	Height	Weight	Year	Hometown
F	10	Abdel Anderson	6 ft 7 in (2.01 m)	185 lb (84 kg)	Sr	Belleville, New Jersey
C	20	James Bailey	6 ft 8 in (2.03 m)	195 lb (88 kg)	Sr	Boston, Massachusetts
G	42	Tom Brown	6 ft 2 in (1.88 m)	190 lb (86 kg)	Sr	Port Washington, New York
G	14	Rodney Duncan	6 ft 0 in (1.83 m)	150 lb (68 kg)	Jr	Philadelphia, Pennsylvania
G	52	Bill Clarke	6 ft 2 in (1.88 m)	165 lb (75 kg)	Sr	Rosedale, New York
G	22	Daris Griffin	6 ft 1 in (1.85 m)	170 lb (77 kg)	Fr	Lakewood, New Jersey
G	32	John Kelly	6 ft 3 in (1.91 m)	180 lb (82 kg)	Sr	Fairfax, Virginia
G	12	Matt Madlinger	6 ft 2 in (1.88 m)	170 lb (77 kg)	So	Piscataway, New Jersey
F	44	Todd Milligan	6 ft 6 in (1.98 m)	190 lb (86 kg)	Jr	Somerset, New Jersey
G	24	Daryl Strickland	6 ft 5 in (1.96 m)	185 lb (84 kg)	Jr	Jersey City, New Jersey

Head coach

- Tom Young (Maryland)

Assistant coach(es)

- Joe Boylan (Lafayette)
- John McFadden (Rutgers)
- Art Perry (American)

Legend

- (C) Team captain
- (S) Suspended
- (I) Ineligible
- (W) Walk-on
- Injured
- Current redshirt

== Schedule and results ==
Date time, TV	Rank^{#}	Opponent^{#}	Result	Record	Site (attendance) city, state
Regular season
Nov 18, 1978*		Columbia	W 70–63	1–0	Louis Brown Athletic Center; Piscataway, New Jersey
Dec 1, 1978*		Rider	W 101–51	2–0	Louis Brown Athletic Center; Piscataway, New Jersey
Dec 2, 1978*		Lafayette	L 70–77	2–1	Louis Brown Athletic Center; Piscataway, New Jersey
Dec 9, 1978		at Villanova	L 67–86	2–2 (0–1)	Villanova Field House; Philadelphia, Pennsylvania
Dec 12, 1978*		at Manhattan	W 62–60 ^{OT}	3–2	Alumni Gym; New York, New York
Dec 16, 1978*		Princeton	W 54–51	4–2	Louis Brown Athletic Center; Piscataway, New Jersey
Dec 22, 1978*		Saint Peter's	L 58–67	4–3	Louis Brown Athletic Center; Piscataway, New Jersey
Dec 29, 1978*		at St. John's; ECAC Holiday Festival	W 72–61	5–3	Madison Square Garden; New York, New York
Dec 30, 1978*		vs. Ohio State; ECAC Holiday Festival	W 97–96 ^{3OT}	6–3	Madison Square Garden; New York, New York
Jan 6, 1979*		at No. 6 UCLA	L 57–78	6–4	Pauley Pavilion (12,176); Los Angeles, California
Jan 9, 1979*		at Connecticut	L 67–69 ^{OT}	6–5	Hugh S. Greer Field House; Storrs, Connecticut
Jan 11, 1979		George Washington	W 80–72	7–5 (1–1)	Louis Brown Athletic Center; Piscataway, New Jersey
Jan 13, 1979*		at St. John's	W 69–66	8–5	Carnesecca Arena; New York, New York
Jan 20, 1979		Penn State	W 48–46	9–5 (2–1)	Louis Brown Athletic Center; Piscataway, New Jersey
Jan 22, 1979*		at No. 12 Syracuse	L 65–71	9–6	Manley Field House; Syracuse, New York
Jan 26, 1979		Duquesne	W 70–67	10–6 (3–1)	Louis Brown Athletic Center; Piscataway, New Jersey
Jan 27, 1979		Villanova	W 64–55	11–6 (4–1)	Louis Brown Athletic Center; Piscataway, New Jersey
Jan 31, 1979		at UMass	W 60–55	12–6 (5–1)	Curry Hicks Cage; Amherst, Massachusetts
Feb 3, 1979		at George Washington	L 71–74	12–7 (5–2)	Charles E. Smith Center; Washington, D.C.
Feb 8, 1979*		Drexel	W 87–61	13–7	Louis Brown Athletic Center; Piscataway, New Jersey
Feb 10, 1979*		at West Virginia	L 61–68	13–8 (5–3)	WVU Coliseum; Morgantown, West Virginia
Feb 12, 1979*		New Hampshire	W 83–73	14–8	Louis Brown Athletic Center; Piscataway, New Jersey
Feb 15, 1979*		vs. Seton Hall	W 88–67	15–8	Madison Square Garden; New York, New York
Feb 17, 1979*		Fordham	W 67–59	16–8	Louis Brown Athletic Center; Piscataway, New Jersey
Feb 19, 1979		UMass	W 95–76	17–8 (6–3)	Louis Brown Athletic Center; Piscataway, New Jersey
Feb 23, 1979		at Pittsburgh	W 76–68	18–8 (7–3)	Fitzgerald Field House; Pittsburgh, Pennsylvania
EAA tournament
Feb 27, 1979*		Penn State; Quarterfinals	W 67–57	19–8	Louis Brown Athletic Center; Piscataway, New Jersey
Mar 1, 1979*		vs. West Virginia; Semifinals	W 55–52	20–8	Civic Arena; Pittsburgh, Pennsylvania
Mar 3, 1979*		at Pittsburgh; Championship game	W 61–57	21–8	Civic Arena; Pittsburgh, Pennsylvania
NCAA tournament
Mar 10, 1979*	(6 E)	vs. (3 E) No. 11 Georgetown; Second round	W 64–58	22–8	Providence Civic Center (12,150); Providence, Rhode Island
Mar 16, 1979*	(6 E)	vs. (10 E) No. 17 St. John's; East Regional semifinal – Sweet Sixteen	L 65–67	22–9	Greensboro Coliseum; Greensboro, North Carolina
*Non-conference game. ^{#}Rankings from AP Poll. (#) Tournament seedings in parentheses. E=East. All times are in Eastern Time.

== Team players drafted into the NBA ==
Round	Pick	Player	NBA club
1	6	James Bailey	Seattle SuperSonics
