= Queen of Peace High School (New Jersey) =

Defunct Catholic high school in Bergen County, New Jersey, US

Location
- 191 Rutherford Place; North Arlington, Bergen County, New Jersey 07031; United States; 40.786628°N 74.131809°W

Information
- Type: Private
- Religious affiliations: Roman Catholic (Sisters of St. Joseph and Lasallians)
- Established: 1930
- Status: Closed
- Closed: June 30, 2017
- Dean: Christopher Brock
- Principal: John Tonero
- Pastor: Fr. Michael Donovan
- Chaplain: Rev. Scott Attanasio
- Faculty: 26.0 FTEs
- Grades: 9–12
- Gender: Coeducational
- Enrollment: 356 (as of 2013-14)
- Student to teacher ratio: 13.7:1
- Colors: Green and Gold
- Athletics conference: North Jersey Interscholastic Conference
- Team name: Golden Griffins
- Accreditation: Middle States Association of Colleges and Schools
- Yearbook: Peace Pact
- Tuition: $8,250
- Website: www.qphs.org

Queen of Peace High School was a Roman Catholic, coeducational parochial high school, serving students in ninth through twelfth grades, located in North Arlington in Bergen County, in the U.S. state of New Jersey, co-sponsored by the Sisters of St. Joseph and the Institute of the Brothers of the Christian Schools. The school closed in June 2017, after 86 years of operation, in the wake of declining enrollment and financial challenges.

The school had been honored two times by the National Blue Ribbon Schools Program, the highest award an American school can receive. It was overseen by the Roman Catholic Archdiocese of Newark. The school has been accredited by the Middle States Association of Colleges and Schools Commission on Elementary and Secondary Schools since 1969.

As of the 2013–14 school year, the school had an enrollment of 356 students and 26.0 classroom teachers (on an FTE basis), for a student–teacher ratio of 13.7:1. The school's enrollment was 49.2% White, 18.3% Asian, 17.7% Hispanic, 6.2% Black, 3.9% Native Hawaiian / Pacific Islander and 4.8% two or more races.

== History ==
In 1999, William "Sonny" Connors, grandfather to Derek Jeter and longtime head of school maintenance, died. In honor of Sonny's service to Queen of Peace, the Jeter family, through Jeter's Turn2 Foundation, started the Connors/Jeter Scholarship Fund. This fund was started to help exceptional, well-rounded students from Queen of Peace and to memorialize Derek's grandfather, William "Sonny" Connors, with two students meeting the criteria of academic and community accomplishments being chosen each year as recipients.

On January 4, 2007, several Queen of Peace students traveled to Rome in order to sing in a private audience to Pope Benedict XVI.

In February 2013, the school attracted national attention when it asked the girls of the school to take a pledge not to curse for 30 days as the school wanted "ladies to act like ladies", though male students at the school were asked not to swear "in the presence of ladies" and were not required to take an oath.

Circa 2016 the school administration announced that it needed $1 million raised for it to remain open. Ultimately about $1,035,000 was raised and the school stayed open for another school year. The necessary money was generated in approximately one month.

Despite the 2016 fundraising campaign, in May 2017, the Archdiocese of Newark announced the closing of the school as of June 30, 2017, in the wake of sharply dropping enrollment and financial challenges, though the affiliated K-8 grammar school will remain open.

== Awards, recognition and rankings ==
During both the 1992–93 and 1997-98 school years, Queen of Peace High School was recognized with the Blue Ribbon School Award of Excellence by the United States Department of Education.

== Athletics ==
The Queen of Peace High School Golden Griffins had competed in the North Jersey Interscholastic Conference, which comprises public and private high schools located in Bergen, Hudson, Passaic counties and was established following a reorganization of sportseagues in Northern New Jersey by the New Jersey State Interscholastic Athletic Association. Prior to the league realignment that took effect in the fall of 2010, Queen of Peace had been a member of the American Division of the Bergen County Scholastic League (BCSL).

St. Mary High School filed a complaint against Queen of Peace High School with the NJSIAA in 2007, claiming that a new wrestling program run by former Gaels coach Scot Weaver at Queen of Peace would induce St. Mary's wrestlers to transfer schools.

The boys cross country running team won the Non-Public Group B state championship in 1970 and 1971.

The boys track team won the Non-Public Group B spring / outdoor track state championship in 1971, 1972, 1974 and 1977.

The 1980 boys' soccer team finished the season with a 14-4-3 record after winning the NJSIAA Boys Non-Public A state championship, defeating runner-up Notre Dame High School by a score of 1-0 in the tournament finals.

The softball team won the Non-Public Group A state championship in 1988 against Donovan Catholic High School.

The girls track team won the indoor track Group I state championship in 2003 and 2005.

The football team won the Non-Public Group II state sectional championship in 2004 with a 35-20 win against DePaul Catholic High School in the finals of the playoff. The 1989 Golden Griffins were the last football team to win the Bergen County Scholastic League championship. As BCSL American Division Champions, the Griffins went on to play Bergen Catholic in the NJSIAA Parochial School state playoffs.

== Notable alumni ==
- Kathleen Donovan (born 1952), politician who served in the New Jersey General Assembly and as Bergen County Executive.
- Frank Iero (born 1981), rhythm guitarist for punk band My Chemical Romance.
- Clifford Omoruyi (born 2001), basketball player for the Rutgers Scarlet Knights men's basketball team

== Notable faculty ==
- Ryan Grant (born 1982), assistant football coach in 2006 who later played for the Green Bay Packers
