= 1978–79 Penn State Nittany Lions basketball team =

American college basketball season

1978–79 Penn State Nittany Lions men's basketball
- Conference: Eastern Athletic Association (Eastern 8)
- Record: 12–18 (4–6 Eastern 8)
- Head coach: Dick Harter (1st season)
- Home arena: Rec Hall

1978–79 Eastern 8 men's basketball standings
	Conf.				Overall
Team	W		L	PCT	W		L	PCT
Villanova	9	–	1	.900	13	–	13	.500
No. 18 Rutgers †	7	–	3	.700	22	–	9	.710
West Virginia	7	–	3	.700	16	–	12	.571
Pittsburgh	6	–	4	.600	18	–	11	.621
George Washington	5	–	5	.500	13	–	14	.481
Penn State	4	–	6	.400	12	–	18	.400
Duquesne	2	–	8	.200	13	–	13	.500
UMass	0	–	10	.000	5	–	22	.185
† 1979 Eastern 8 Tournament winner Rankings from AP Poll

The 1978–79 Penn State Nittany Lions men's basketball team represented the Pennsylvania State University during the 1978–79 NCAA Division I men's basketball season. The team was led by 1st-year head coach Dick Harter, and played their home games at Rec Hall in University Park, Pennsylvania as members of the Eastern Athletic Association (Eastern 8).

== Roster ==
1978–79 Penn State Nittany Lions men's basketball team
Players
Coaches

Pos.	#	Name	Height	Weight	Year	Hometown
F	43	Frank Brickowski	6 ft 9 in (2.06 m)	232 lb (105 kg)	So	Bayville, New York
G	12	Craig Buffie	6 ft 3 in (1.91 m)	185 lb (84 kg)	Fr	Bloomington, Indiana
G	10	Mike Edelman	6 ft 2 in (1.88 m)	180 lb (82 kg)	Fr	Havertown, Pennsylvania
C	55	Carvin Jefferson	6 ft 8 in (2.03 m)	200 lb (91 kg)	Sr	Washington, DC
F/C	45	Gary Korkowski	6 ft 8 in (2.03 m)	225 lb (102 kg)	Jr	Solon, Ohio
F	51	Steve Kuhn	6 ft 7 in (2.01 m)	200 lb (91 kg)	Jr	Lebanon, Pennsylvania
F	42	Mike Owens	6 ft 6 in (1.98 m)	215 lb (98 kg)	Fr	Wilmington, Delaware
G	33	Jim Solic	6 ft 4 in (1.93 m)	193 lb (88 kg)	Fr	State College, Pennsylvania
G	21	Tom Wilkinson	6 ft 1 in (1.85 m)	165 lb (75 kg)	Jr	Lynbrook, New York
F	31	Scott Wolz	6 ft 7 in (2.01 m)	208 lb (94 kg)	Fr	Silver Spring, Maryland
G	14	Jud Wood	6 ft 4 in (1.93 m)	175 lb (79 kg)	Sr	Columbus, Ohio
F	23	Walter Young	6 ft 4 in (1.93 m)	180 lb (82 kg)	Jr	Camden, New Jersey

Head coach

- Dick Harter

Assistant coach(es)

- Perry Clark

Legend

- (C) Team captain
- (S) Suspended
- (I) Ineligible
- (W) Walk-on
- Injured
- Current redshirt

== Schedule ==
Date time, TV	Rank^{#}	Opponent^{#}	Result	Record	Site city, state
November 24*		vs. No. 4 Louisville	L 58–89	0–1	Buckner Fieldhouse; Fort Richardson, Alaska
November 25*		at Alaska-Anchorage	L 60–79	0–2	Buckner Fieldhouse; Fort Richardson, Alaska
November 26*		vs. No. 10 Indiana	L 65–86	0–3	Buckner Fieldhouse; Fort Richardson, Alaska
November 29*		at Delaware	W 60–47	1–3	Delaware Field House; Newark, Delaware
December 3*		Vermont	W 78–53	2–3	Rec Hall; University Park, Pennsylvania
December 7*		vs. No. 19 Maryland	L 61–69	2–4	Hersheypark Arena; Hershey, Pennsylvania
December 9		at West Virginia	L 47–56	2–5 (0–1)	WVU Coliseum; Morgantown, West Virginia
December 13*		Saint Francis (PA)	L 63–68 ^{OT}	2–6 (0–1)	Rec Hall; University Park, Pennsylvania
December 16*		No. 20 Syracuse	L 50–67	2–7 (0–1)	Rec Hall; University Park, Pennsylvania
December 19*		Colgate	W 82–80	3–7 (0–1)	Rec Hall; University Park, Pennsylvania
December 22*		vs. Tulane	L 50–54	3–8 (0–1)	University of Dayton Arena; Dayton, Ohio
December 23*		vs. Florida State	W 64–57	4–8 (0–1)	University of Dayton Arena; Dayton, Ohio
December 29*		vs. No. 9 NC State	L 58–80	4–9 (0–1)	Reynolds Coliseum; Raleigh, North Carolina
January 3*		vs. Richmond	W 69–65	5–9 (0–1)	Robins Center; Richmond, Virginia
January 4*		Ursinus	W 85–59	6–9 (0–1)	Rec Hall; University Park, Pennsylvania
January 10*		at No. 20 Syracuse	L 70–85	6–10 (0–1)	Manley Field House; Syracuse, New York
January 13*		at Virginia Tech	L 68–83	6–11 (0–1)	Cassell Coliseum; Blacksburg, Virginia
January 17		West Virginia	L 53–72	6–12 (0–2)	Rec Hall; University Park, Pennsylvania
January 20		at Rutgers	L 46–48	6–13 (0–3)	Louis Brown Athletic Center; Piscataway, New Jersey
January 24		Duquesne	W 54–49	7–13 (1–3)	Rec Hall; University Park, Pennsylvania
January 27		at Pittsburgh	L 44–50	7–14 (1–4)	Fitzgerald Field House; Pittsburgh, Pennsylvania
January 31		George Washington	W 51–46	8–14 (2–4)	Rec Hall; University Park, Pennsylvania
February 4		Villanova	L 34–36	8–15 (2–5)	Rec Hall; University Park, Pennsylvania
February 7*		at No. 19 Temple	L 43–54	8–16 (2–5)	McGonigle Hall; Philadelphia, Pennsylvania
February 10*		Navy	W 43–40	9–16 (2–5)	Rec Hall; University Park, Pennsylvania
February 14		Pittsburgh	L 45–54	9–17 (2–6)	Rec Hall; University Park, Pennsylvania
February 17*		Army	W 74–57	10–17 (2–6)	Rec Hall; University Park, Pennsylvania
February 21		at UMass	W 54–42	11–17 (3–6)	Curry Hicks Cage; Amherst, Massachusetts
February 25		at Duquesne	W 58–57	12–17 (4–6)	Civic Arena; Pittsburgh, Pennsylvania
EAAC tournament
February 27		at Rutgers	L 57–67	12–18 (4–6)	Louis Brown Athletic Center; Piscataway, New Jersey
*Non-conference game. ^{#}Rankings from AP poll. (#) Tournament seedings in parentheses. All times are in Eastern Time.
