= 1979 Eastern 8 men's basketball tournament =

- Classification: Division I
- Season: 1978–79
- Teams: 8
- Site: Civic Arena; Pittsburgh, Pennsylvania
- Champions: Rutgers (1st title)
- Winning coach: Tom Young (1st title)
- MVP: James Bailey (Rutgers)

1978–79 Eastern 8 men's basketball standings
	Conf.				Overall
Team	W		L	PCT	W		L	PCT
Villanova	9	–	1	.900	13	–	13	.500
No. 18 Rutgers †	7	–	3	.700	22	–	9	.710
West Virginia	7	–	3	.700	16	–	12	.571
Pittsburgh	6	–	4	.600	18	–	11	.621
George Washington	5	–	5	.500	13	–	14	.481
Penn State	4	–	6	.400	12	–	18	.400
Duquesne	2	–	8	.200	13	–	13	.500
UMass	0	–	10	.000	5	–	22	.185
† 1979 Eastern 8 Tournament winner Rankings from AP Poll

The 1979 Eastern 8 men's basketball tournament was held in Pittsburgh, Pennsylvania, at the Civic Arena from February 27 to March 3, 1979 (First Round games were held at campus sites).

Rutgers defeated Pittsburgh 61-57 in the final.

== Bracket ==
First round February 27, 1979
1	Villanova	78*
8	Massachusetts	73
4	Pittsburgh	85
5	George Washington	80
2	West Virginia	73
7	Duquesne	59
3	Rutgers	67
6	Penn State	57

Semi-Finals; March 1, 1979
1	Villanova	64
4	Pittsburgh	77
2	West Virginia	52
3	Rutgers	55

Finals; March 3, 1979
4	Pittsburgh	57
3	Rutgers	61

== Final standings ==
Villanova	9 1	15 13
West Virginia	7 3	16 12
Rutgers	7 3	22 9
Pittsburgh	6 4	18 11
George Washington	5 5	13 14
Penn State	4 6	12 18
Duquesne	2 8	13 13
Massachusetts	0 10	5 22
Overall Non-Conference Record 74-72
