= Myles Mack =

American basketball player

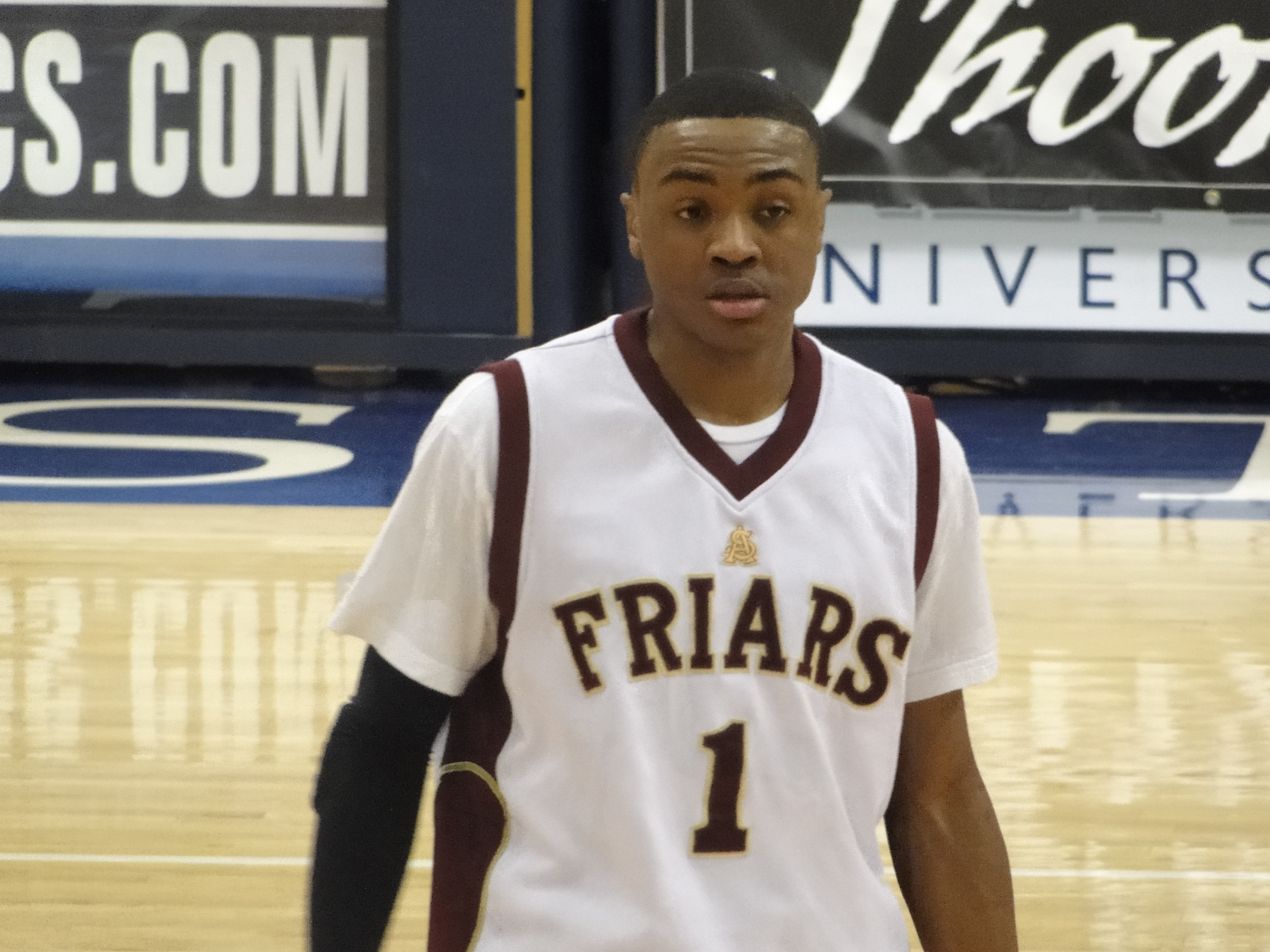
- Mack at St. Anthony in 2010

Nuova Pallacanestro Vigevano 1955
- Position: Point guard
- League: Serie A2

Personal information
- Born: February 25, 1993 (age 33) Paterson, New Jersey, U.S.
- Listed height: 5 ft 10 in (1.78 m)
- Listed weight: 175 lb (79 kg)

Career information
- High school: St. Anthony (Jersey City, New Jersey)
- College: Rutgers (2011–2015)
- NBA draft: 2015: undrafted
- Playing career: 2015–present

Career history
- 2015: Dzukija Alytus
- 2016–2017: Horsens IC
- 2017: Turów Zgorzelec
- 2018–2019: GTK Gliwice
- 2019–2021: Balıkesir Belediyespor
- 2021–2022: Denain Voltaire Basket
- 2022: Soproni KC
- 2022–2023: MKE Ankaragücü
- 2023–2024: Konyaspor
- 2024: Indios de San Francisco
- 2024–present: Nuova Pallacanestro Vigevano 1955

Career highlights
- Danish Cup Final MVP (2017)

Myles Mack (born February 25, 1993) is an American professional basketball player who plays as a point guard for Italy's second-tier club Nuova Pallacanestro Vigevano 1955. He played college basketball at Rutgers University.

== High school career ==
Mack played high school basketball at Paterson Catholic High School for his first three seasons. During his junior season, he helped Paterson Catholic achieve a 28–1 record and at one point the number 3 rank in the national polls. He scored a total of 979 points there. The school then closed after the 2010 academic school year, leading Mack to transfer to well-renowned St. Anthony High School located in Jersey City and play under head coach Bob Hurley.

Mack achieved great success with St. Anthony during his senior season in 2011 as well, leading the team to a perfect record of 33–0 and the #1 national ranking according to USA Today. They eventually went on to win a state title. He averaged 15.2 points, 3.6 assists and 2.9 steals per game as a senior helping him achieve national recognition. Mack was nationally ranked 112th overall and 22nd as a point guard in the class of 2011, according to Rivals.com, while ranking 63rd overall, according to ESPNU Top 100. On September 1, 2010, Mack officially committed to play for the Rutgers Scarlet Knights.

== College career ==
Mack became starting point guard for the Scarlet Knights in the 2011–12 season. He finished the season averaging 9.8 points, 2.1 assists, 2.0 rebounds, and 1.4 steals per game. As a sophomore, Mack became the leading scorer for Rutgers finishing the 2012–13 season averaging 13.6 points, 2.7 assists, 2.6 rebounds, and 1.8 steals per game. As a junior (2013–14) and senior (2014–15) he led the Scarlet Knights in points and assists per game.

== Professional career ==
On June 10, 2017, Mack signed with the Polish team Turów Zgorzelec, to which he came from Danish team Horsens IC where he averaged 16.5 points, 3.3 rebounds and 4.8 assists per game. In August 2018 Mack signed a one-year deal with polish top division team GTK Gliwice. He joined Balıkesir Belediyespor of the Turkish Basketball First League in 2019. During the 2020-21 season, Mack averaged 16.7 points, 6.3 assists, 2.8 rebounds, and 2.5 steals per game. On October 7, 2021, Mack signed with Denain Voltaire Basket of the LNB Pro B. He averaged 11.5 points, 4.6 assists, 2.2 rebounds, and 1.5 steals per game.

On February 5, 2022, Mack signed with Soproni KC of the Nemzeti Bajnokság I/A, following an injury to starting point guard Rickey McGill.

On August 15, 2023, he signed with Konyaspor of the Türkiye Basketbol Ligi (TBL).
