= 1980–81 Pittsburgh Panthers men's basketball team =

American college basketball season

1980–81 Pittsburgh Panthers men's basketball

Eastern 8 tournament champion

NCAA tournament, Second Round, L 57–74 vs. North Carolina
- Conference: Eastern 8
- Record: 19–12 (8–5 Eastern 8)
- Head coach: Roy Chipman (1st season)
- Assistant coaches: Reggie Warford (1st season); Seth Greenberg (1st season); Dave Progar (1st season)
- Home arena: Fitzgerald Field House (Capacity: 4,122)

1980–81 Eastern 8 men's basketball standings
	Conf.				Overall
Team	W		L	PCT	W		L	PCT
Rhode Island	10	–	3	.769	21	–	8	.724
Duquesne	10	–	3	.769	20	–	10	.667
West Virginia	9	–	4	.692	23	–	10	.697
Pittsburgh †	8	–	5	.615	19	–	12	.613
Rutgers	7	–	6	.538	16	–	14	.533
St. Bonaventure	6	–	4	.600	14	–	13	.519
George Washington	4	–	9	.308	8	–	19	.296
UMass	0	–	13	.000	3	–	24	.111
† 1981 Eastern 8 Tournament winner Rankings from AP Poll

The 1980–81 Pittsburgh Panthers men's basketball team represented the University of Pittsburgh in the 1980–81 NCAA Division I men's basketball season. Led by first year head coach Roy Chipman, the Panthers finished with a record of 19–12. They received an automatic bid to the 1981 NCAA Division I Basketball Tournament where they lost in the second round to North Carolina.
