= William E. Grady CTE High School =

Public school in New York City

William E. Grady Career and Technical Education High School

Location
- 25 Brighton 4th Road; Region 7 Brooklyn, NY 11235; United States
- Coordinates: 40°34′58″N 73°57′48″W

Information
- Type: Public high school, Career & Technical Education School
- Established: 1941
- Status: Open
- School district: 21
- Superintendent: Horowitz, Aimee
- Principal: Tarah Montalbano
- Grades: 9–12 & SE
- Enrollment: 956
- Color: Maroon Gold
- Mascot: Falcons
- Nickname: Grady
- Website: http://www.gradyhs.com/

William E. Grady Career and Technical Education High School is a public, Career and Technical Education (CTE) high school located at 25 Brighton 4th Road, Brighton Beach, Brooklyn, New York, USA. It is a part of region 7 in the New York City Department of Education. Grady High School was established in 1941.

It offers three-year programs in automotive technology, construction, culinary, healthcare and IT. While the school was slated for closure in 2010 due to poor performance, the performance improved and in April 2012 they announced it would remain open.

== Notable alumni ==
- KRS-One, Grammy-nominated rapper, co-founder of Boogie Down Productions (attended)
- Rolando Blackman, former professional basketball player. He was a four-time All-Star who spent most of his career with the Dallas Mavericks.
- Tony Lo Bianco, actor in films and television
- Quincy Douby drafted first round, 19th pick by the Sacramento Kings in the 2006 NBA draft. Currently playing overseas.
- Norman Richardson, former professional basketball player
