= Clifford Omoruyi =

Nigerian basketball player (born 2001)

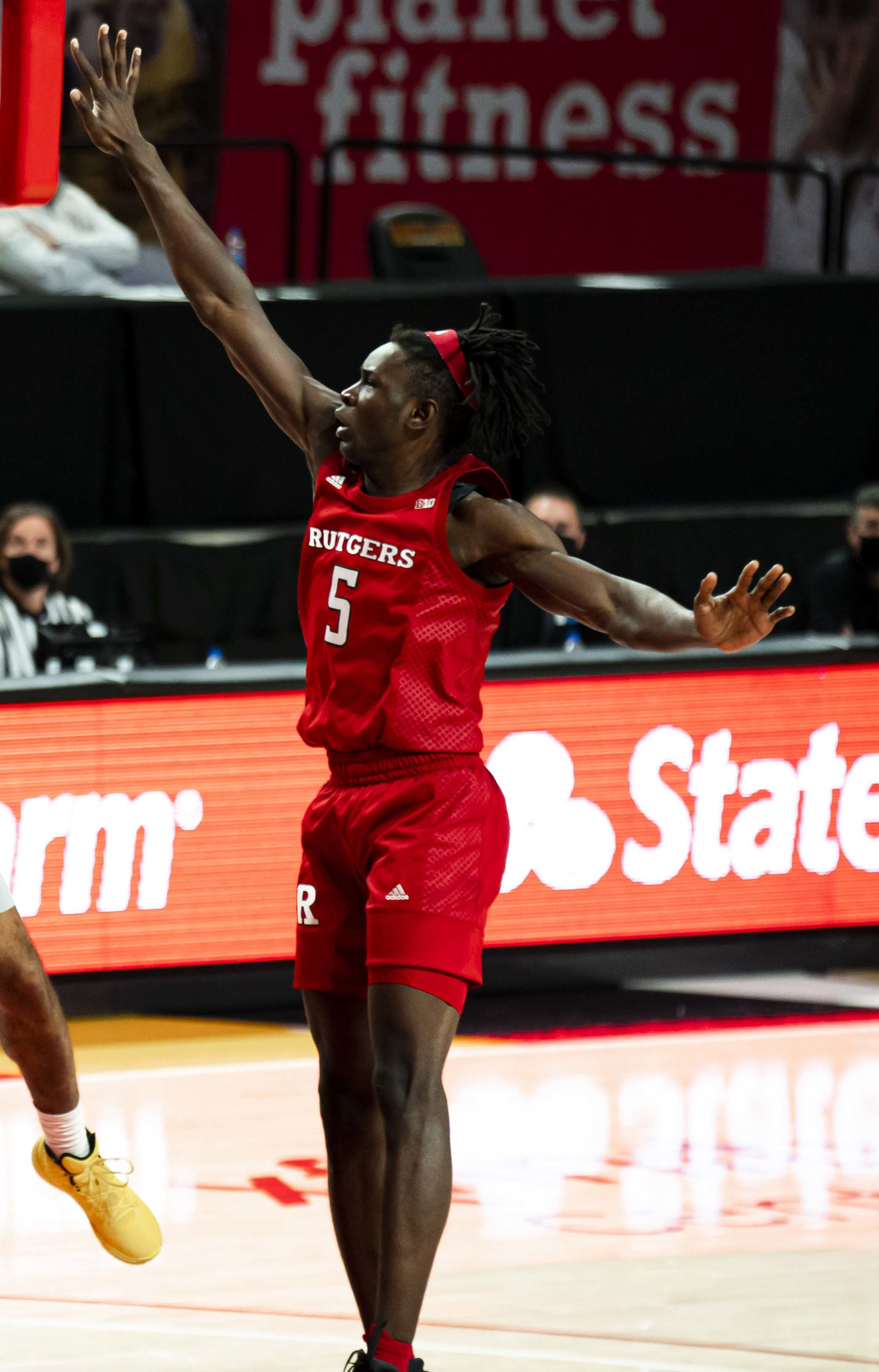
- Omoruyi with Rutgers in 2020

No. 7 – SIG Strasbourg
- Position: Center
- League: LNB Élite

Personal information
- Born: 11 October 2001 (age 25) Benin City, Nigeria
- Listed height: 6 ft 11 in (2.11 m)
- Listed weight: 240 lb (109 kg)

Career information
- High school: Queen of Peace (North Arlington, New Jersey); Immaculate Conception (Montclair, New Jersey); Roselle Catholic (Roselle, New Jersey)
- College: Rutgers (2020–2024); Alabama (2024–2025)
- NBA draft: 2025: undrafted
- Playing career: 2025–present

Career history
- 2025: Maccabi Tel Aviv
- 2025–2026: Galatasaray
- 2026: PAOK Thessaloniki
- 2026–present: SIG Strasbourg

Career highlights
- Second-team All-Big Ten – Media (2023); Third-team All-Big Ten – Coaches (2023); 2× Big Ten All-Defensive Team (2023, 2024)

Clifford Iyobosa Omoruyi (born 11 October 2001) is a Nigerian professional basketball player for SIG Strasbourg of the LNB Élite. He most recently played for PAOK Thessaloniki of the Greek Basketball League (GBL) and the EuroCup. He played college basketball for the Rutgers Scarlet Knights and Alabama Crimson Tide.

== Early life and high school career ==
Omoruyi grew up in Benin City, Nigeria and played soccer. Standing 6 feet 11 inches (2.11 m), he received attention from basketball scouts who stated he could earn a scholarship overseas. At the age of 14, Omoruyi moved to the United States to attend Queen of Peace High School in North Arlington, New Jersey. Muhammad Oliver, a friend of Omoruyi's brother Aldred, and his wife offered to serve as his host family. Omoruyi also began playing basketball shortly after his arrival, initially against Oliver's son and then in AAU events. As a freshman at Queen of Peace, he nearly averaged a double-double in four games before breaking his leg. Omoruyi returned in time for the state tournament and posted 22 points, 10 rebounds and five blocks in a game. Due to Queen of Peace shutting down, Omoruyi was forced to transfer to Roselle Catholic High School, and initially struggled with his grades. He transferred to Immaculate Conception High School for the second semester of his sophomore season to focus on academics, playing 10 games.

Omoruyi transferred back to Roselle Catholic High School going into his junior season, stating he did not wish to run from challenges. He averaged 11.6 points, 7.1 rebounds and 2.8 blocks per game as a junior. As a senior, Omoruyi averaged 14.2 points, 11.5 rebounds and 5.4 blocks per game, helping Roselle Catholic post a 22–7 record and win the NJSIAA's Non-Public B North title. Omoruyi was named the Gatorade New Jersey Player of the Year, First Team All-State by NJHoops.com and Second Team All-State by The Star-Ledger. On the Nike Elite Youth Basketball League circuit, he averaged 11.8 points, 6.7 rebounds and 1.5 blocks per game for the New York Lightning. He was considered to be a four-star prospect ranked 42nd in his class by Rivals. On 29 March 2020, Omoruyi committed to playing college basketball for Rutgers over offers from Arizona State and Auburn. He became the highest-rated recruit to select the Scarlet Knights since Kadeem Jack in 2010.

== College career ==
Omoruyi suffered a knee sprain six games into his freshman season, forcing him to miss three weeks. As a freshman, he averaged 3.8 points and four rebounds per game. Omoruyi became the team's starting center going into his sophomore season due to Myles Johnson's transfer to UCLA. In his sophomore season debut, he scored 16 points and had nine rebounds against Lehigh, and subsequently enjoyed a breakout season. Omoruyi was named honorable mention All-Big Ten by the media as a sophomore. He averaged 11.9 points and 7.8 rebounds per game. Omoruyi averaged 13.2 points and 9.6 rebounds per game as a junior and was named to the Second Team All-Big Ten. He declared for the 2023 NBA draft before opting to return to Rutgers.

On December 16, 2023, Omoruyi scored a career-high 25 points to go with 11 rebounds in a 83-61 win over LIU. As a senior, he averaged 10.4 points, 8.3 rebounds, and 2.9 blocks per game, earning Big Ten All-Defensive Team honors. Following the season, Omoruyi transferred from Rutgers to Alabama. A four-star transfer, he was ranked the No. 3 center and No. 13 overall player in the transfer portal according to 247Sports and chose the Crimson Tide over North Carolina, Kansas State and Georgetown. Omoruyi averaged 7.9 points, 6.5 rebounds and 1.1 blocks per game while shooting 73 percent from the field, helping Alabama reach the NCAA Tournament Elite Eight. Omoruyi was a perfect 15-15 from the field over a stretch that lasted from the 9 minute mark of the first half of the SEC tournament semifinal to the 3:51 mark of the first half of the 2nd Round of the NCAA tournament. This streak included 8 dunks against Robert Morris in the 1st round of the NCAA tournament.

== Professional career ==
After going undrafted in the 2025 NBA draft, Omoruyi joined the Toronto Raptors on an Exhibit 10 contract after playing with the team in the NBA Summer League. He was waived before training camp and subsequently began his professional career in Europe.

=== Maccabi Tel Aviv (2025) ===
On 4 September 2025, Omoruyi signed his first professional contract, a two-year deal with Maccabi Tel Aviv. During his brief stint with the Israeli club, he made five appearances, including three in the EuroLeague and two in the Israeli domestic league.

=== Galatasaray (2025–2026) ===
On 12 December 2025, Omoruyi moved to Turkey and signed a one-year contract with Galatasaray. He appeared in six games across the Basketbol Süper Ligi and Basketball Champions League. In his Basketball Champions League appearance against Igokea, he scored 8 points as Galatasaray won 82–65.

Following a coaching change at Galatasaray, his role with the team was affected and, on 30 January 2026, the club announced that his contract had been terminated by mutual agreement.

=== PAOK Thessaloniki (2026) ===
On 30 January 2026, Omoruyi signed with PAOK Thessaloniki for the remainder of the 2025–26 season, with an option for an additional year. The move was his third club of his first professional season, after beginning the campaign with Maccabi Tel Aviv and later playing for Galatasaray.

Omoruyi made his PAOK debut on 4 February 2026 in the FIBA Europe Cup, scoring 8 points in a 101–67 home victory over Sporting CP.

He gradually established himself in PAOK's frontcourt rotation and contributed during the club's run to the 2025–26 FIBA Europe Cup Final. In eight games in the competition, he averaged 6.4 points and 4.1 rebounds per game, while shooting 60% from two-point range. He recorded 10 points and 8 rebounds in the second leg of PAOK's semifinal series against UCAM Murcia, helping the team advance to the final.

Omoruyi also became an increasingly important part of PAOK's rotation during the closing stages of the domestic season. He scored 17 points in a 100–87 Greek League victory over Mykonos in March and later produced 19 points against Panathinaikos during the league playoffs.

Across all competitions with PAOK during the 2025–26 season, Omoruyi made 22 appearances and averaged 7.0 points and 4.1 rebounds per game, shooting 65.6% from two-point range and 75.6% from the free-throw line.

His performances during the second half of the season earned him the confidence of the club and incoming head coach Andrea Trinchieri. On 30 June 2026, PAOK exercised the option in his contract and renewed his deal for the 2026–27 season. Omoruyi later stated that, after playing for three different teams in three countries during his first professional season, he had found stability at PAOK, while the club noted that he had earned the trust of both the team and Trinchieri.

On 17 November 2026, PAOK announced that Omoruyi had left the club following the mutual termination of his contract.

=== SIG Strasbourg (2026–present) ===
On November 1, 2026, he signed with SIG Strasbourg of the LNB Élite.

== National team career ==
Omoruyi was invited to the training camp of the Nigeria men's national basketball team in preparation for the 2020 Summer Olympics.

== Career statistics ==
Legend
GP	Games played	GS	Games started	MPG	Minutes per game
FG%	Field goal percentage	3P%	3-point field goal percentage	FT%	Free throw percentage
RPG	Rebounds per game	APG	Assists per game	SPG	Steals per game
BPG	Blocks per game	PPG	Points per game	**Bold**	Career high

=== College ===
Year	Team	GP	GS	MPG	FG%	3P%	FT%	RPG	APG	SPG	BPG	PPG
2020–21	Rutgers	23	6	14.9	.632	**.500**	.424	4.0	.2	.4	.7	3.8
2021–22	Rutgers	32	32	28.7	.624	.167	.602	7.8	.4	.5	1.3	11.9
2022–23	Rutgers	34	34	**30.3**	.507	.182	.604	**9.6**	**.9**	.6	2.1	**13.2**
2023–24	Rutgers	32	32	26.9	.512	.200	.610	8.3	.5	**.7**	**2.9**	10.4
2024–25	Alabama	**37**	**37**	19.2	**.734**	0	**.725**	6.5	**.9**	.4	1.1	7.9
Career		158	141	24.4	.575	.200	.616	7.4	.6	.5	1.7	9.8
