= 1980–81 Rutgers Scarlet Knights men's basketball team =

American college basketball season

1980–81 Rutgers Scarlet Knights men's basketball
- Conference: Eastern Athletic Association
- Record: 16–14 (7–6 EAA)
- Head coach: Tom Young (8th season)
- Home arena: Louis Brown Athletic Center

1980–81 Eastern 8 men's basketball standings
	Conf.				Overall
Team	W		L	PCT	W		L	PCT
Rhode Island	10	–	3	.769	21	–	8	.724
Duquesne	10	–	3	.769	20	–	10	.667
West Virginia	9	–	4	.692	23	–	10	.697
Pittsburgh †	8	–	5	.615	19	–	12	.613
Rutgers	7	–	6	.538	16	–	14	.533
St. Bonaventure	6	–	4	.600	14	–	13	.519
George Washington	4	–	9	.308	8	–	19	.296
UMass	0	–	13	.000	3	–	24	.111
† 1981 Eastern 8 Tournament winner Rankings from AP Poll

The 1980–81 Rutgers Scarlet Knights men's basketball team represented Rutgers University in 1980–81 NCAA Division I men's basketball season.

== Schedule ==
Date time, TV	Rank^{#}	Opponent^{#}	Result	Record	Site city, state
November 29*		American	W 75–62	1–0	Louis Brown Athletic Center; Piscataway, NJ
December 2*		Princeton	W 57–47	2–0	Louis Brown Athletic Center; Piscataway, NJ
December 5*		Columbia	W 78–63	3–0	Louis Brown Athletic Center; Piscataway, NJ
December 6*		Saint Peter's	W 56–51	4–0	Louis Brown Athletic Center; Piscataway, NJ
December 9		at St. Bonaventure	L 67–77	4–1 (0–1)	Reilly Center; St. Bonaventure, NY
December 13*		at St. John's	L 70–71	4–2 (0–1)	Alumni Hall; Queens, NY
December 20*		Penn State	L 76–78	4–3 (0–1)	Louis Brown Athletic Center; Piscataway, NJ
December 22*		at No. 6 North Carolina	L 64–71	4–4 (0–1)	Carmichael Arena; Chapel Hill, NC
December 27*		vs. No. 15 Indiana	L 50–55	4–5 (0–1)	Neal S. Blaisdell Center; Honolulu, Hawaii
December 28*		vs. Louisiana Tech	L 47–51	4–6 (0–1)	Neal S. Blaisdell Center; Honolulu, Hawaii
December 29*		vs. Loyola Marymount	W 91–54	5–6 (0–1)	Neal S. Blaisdell Center; Honolulu, Hawaii
January 8		UMass	W 92–58	6–6 (1–1)	Louis Brown Athletic Center; Piscataway, NJ
January 10		at Pittsburgh	W 69–55	7–6 (2–1)	Fitzgerald Field House; Pittsburgh, Pennsylvania
January 14		George Washington	W 81–68	8–6 (3–1)	Louis Brown Athletic Center; Piscataway, NJ
January 17		St. Bonaventure	L 58–64	8–7 (3–2)	Louis Brown Athletic Center; Piscataway, NJ
January 20		at Duquesne	L 60–62	8–8 (3–3)	Civic Arena; Pittsburgh, Pennsylvania
January 22*		Fordham	W 77–63	9–8 (3–3)	Louis Brown Athletic Center; Piscataway, NJ
January 27*		Duke	L 51–53	9–9 (3–3)	Louis Brown Athletic Center; Piscataway, NJ
January 31		Rhode Island	L 49–56	9–10 (3–4)	Louis Brown Athletic Center; Piscataway, NJ
February 3*		at Manhattan	W 90–57	10–10 (3–4)	Draddy Gymnasium; The Bronx, NY
February 5		West Virginia	W 73–71	11–10 (4–4)	Louis Brown Athletic Center; Piscataway, NJ
February 7		at George Washington	W 76–71	12–10 (5–4)	Charles E. Smith Center; Washington, D. C.
February 10		at UMass	W 74–53	13–10 (6–4)	Curry Hicks Cage; Amherst, Massachusetts
February 14		at West Virginia	L 67–73	13–11 (6–5)	WVU Coliseum; Morgantown, WV
February 16*		Long Island	W 90–72	14–11 (6–5)	Louis Brown Athletic Center; Piscataway, NJ
February 19*		vs. Seton Hall	L 56–65	14–12 (6–5)	Madison Square Garden; New York, NY
February 21*		Fairfield	W 87–57	15–12 (6–5)	Louis Brown Athletic Center; Piscataway, NJ
February 25		Duquesne	L 68–69	15–13 (6–6)	Louis Brown Athletic Center; Piscataway, NJ
February 28		Pittsburgh	W 61–60	16–13 (7–6)	Louis Brown Athletic Center; Piscataway, NJ
Eastern 8 tournament
March 5		at Pittsburgh	L 62–67	16–14 (7–6)	Fitzgerald Field House; Pittsburgh, Pennsylvania
*Non-conference game. ^{#}Rankings from AP Poll. (#) Tournament seedings in parentheses.
