= Quincy Douby =

American Montenegrin basketball player (born 1984)

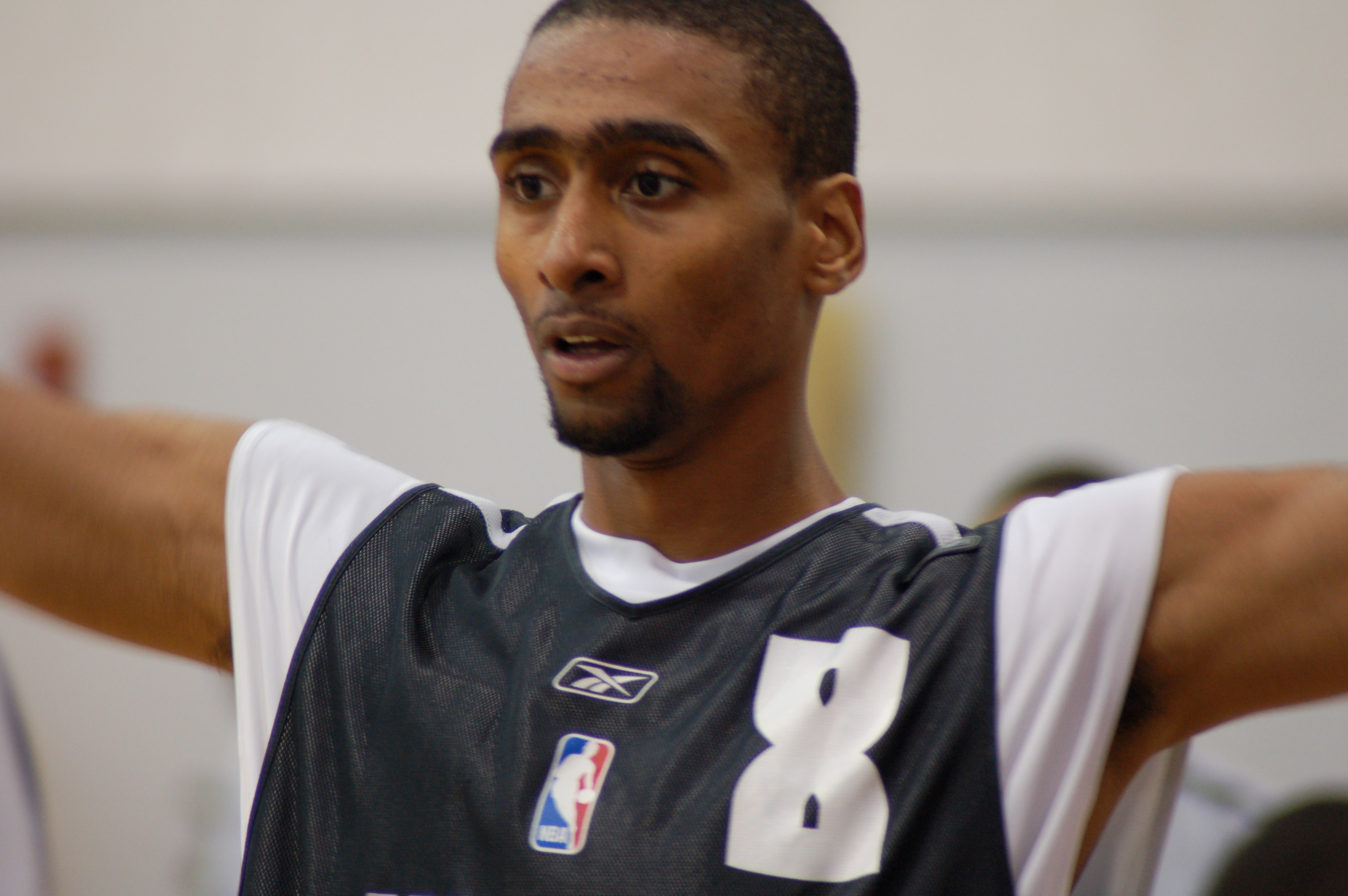

Personal information
- Born: May 16, 1984 (age 42) Brooklyn, New York, U.S.
- Listed height: 6 ft 3 in (1.91 m)
- Listed weight: 175 lb (79 kg)

Career information
- High school: William E. Grady (Brooklyn, New York); St. Thomas More (Oakdale, Connecticut)
- College: Rutgers (2003–2006)
- NBA draft: 2006: 1st round, 19th overall pick
- Drafted by: Sacramento Kings
- Playing career: 2006–2019
- Position: Shooting guard / point guard
- Number: 8, 5

Career history
- 2006–2009: Sacramento Kings
- 2009: Erie BayHawks
- 2009: Toronto Raptors
- 2009–2010: Darüşşafaka Cooper Tires
- 2010–2011: Xinjiang Flying Tigers
- 2012: UCAM Murcia
- 2012–2013: Zhejiang Golden Bulls
- 2013: Sagesse Beirut
- 2013: Applied Science University
- 2013: Sioux Falls Skyforce
- 2013–2014: Shanghai Sharks
- 2014: Darüşşafaka & Doğuş
- 2014: Tianjin Ronggang
- 2016: Westchester Knicks
- 2017: Afyonkarahisar Belediyespor
- 2017–2018: Sporting Al Riyadi Beirut
- 2018–2019: Beirut Club

Career highlights
- FIBA Asia Champions Cup First Team (2017); CBA All-Star Game MVP (2011); 2× CBA All-Star (2011, 2013); Turkish League Top Scorer (2010); TBL All-Star (2010); First-team All-Big East (2006); Big East All-Rookie Team (2004)
- Stats at NBA.com
- Stats at Basketball Reference

Quincy Douby (born May 16, 1984) is an American-born, naturalized Montenegrin former professional basketball player. At 6 ft 3 in (1.91 m), 175 pounds (79 kg), Douby played shooting guard for the Rutgers Scarlet Knights. The Sacramento Kings made him the 19th selection of the 2006 NBA draft.

== High school career ==
Douby grew up in the Coney Island neighborhood of Brooklyn. He attended the nearby William E. Grady High School, playing for the basketball team his junior and senior years, after he was discovered playing pick up basketball by New York City Hall of Fame coach Jack Ringel. Ringel helped develop Douby's raw skills and athleticism and transform his as player. During his junior season, Grady won the PSAL A division championship, with Douby scoring 19 points in the championship game after Grady rode him the whole season. In his senior year, Douby averaged 35.6 points per game, leading Grady to the PSAL semifinals. Douby set the school record by scoring 63 points in an all-around performance against Franklin D. Roosevelt High School. Douby then enrolled in the St. Thomas More School prep school in Oakdale, Connecticut for the 2002–03 year. Douby initially committed to Hofstra University to play basketball, until head coach of Rutgers University men's basketball team, Gary Waters jumped in and swayed Douby to commit to the Scarlet Knights. Douby was able to make the transformation from a street baller, to a Division I basketball player.

Due to his close relationship with high school coach Jack Ringel, Douby would purchase a house in Ringel's neighboring town of Freehold, New Jersey.

== College career ==
As a freshman at Rutgers, Douby scored 35 points to lead the team to an overtime victory in the NIT semifinal game. Douby was named to the Big East All-Rookie Team at the end of his freshman year.

Douby improved on his freshman season by averaging 15.1 points a game (11th in the Big East) and 3.38 assists a game, while posting an assist-to-turnover ratio of 2:1. He was named Big East player of the Week along with West Virginia's Tyrone Sally the week of November 29. Despite finishing last in the Big East, Rutgers upset Notre Dame in the first round of the Big East Tournament, with Douby scoring 15 points in the game.

In his junior year, Douby, as guard, was named to the All-Big East team. He led the Big East in scoring with 25.4 points a game, becoming the first Rutgers player to lead the Big East in scoring. In addition, he broke the all-time single-season scoring record at Rutgers. Douby scored a Big East season high and Carrier Dome opponent record 41 points at Syracuse on February 1, 2006. After leading Rutgers to a first-round victory in the Big East tournament over Seton Hall, Douby dropped 31 over the #2 Villanova Wildcats. On May 15, 2006, Douby officially hired an agent making himself ineligible to return to college.

== Professional career ==
On June 28, 2006, Douby was drafted in the first round by the Sacramento Kings, 19th overall. Douby became the first Rutgers player to be drafted in the first round since Roy Hinson in 1983. On July 3, 2006, he was signed to a contract by Sacramento.

On February 18, 2009, Douby was waived by the Kings in order make room for the trade that included Brad Miller and Drew Gooden.

On March 11, 2009, Douby was picked up by the Erie BayHawks of the NBA Development League.

On March 24, 2009, he was called up by the Toronto Raptors and signed to a 10-day contract. On April 3, he was signed to a second 10-day contract, which was extended up until the end of the 2008–09 NBA season ten days later.

On November 12, 2009, Douby was released by the Raptors. He did not appear in any games for them during the 2009–10 NBA season.

On November 17, 2009, Douby signed a one-year contract with the Turkish team Darüşşafaka Cooper Tires. He finished as the top scorer of the Turkish Basketball League, averaging 23.6 points and 4.9 assists per game for his team.

On September 17, 2010, Douby signed a one-year contract with the Chinese team Xinjiang Flying Tigers.

In March 2012 he signed with UCAM Murcia until the end of the season.

Later that year, he returned to China as a member of the Zhejiang Golden Bulls. On January 2, 2013, Douby set a CBA record for points with 75. During the 2012–13 season, he averaged 31.6 points per game. Douby previously set CBA records for the most points scored in a Finals game (53) and in an All-Star game (44). At the end of the CBA season, he joined Sagesse Beirut in Lebanon. In September 2013, he played for Applied Science University at the 2013 FIBA Asia Champions Cup.

On November 1, 2013, he was acquired by the Sioux Falls Skyforce. Later that month, he left the Skyforce after just two games and signed with the Shanghai Sharks of China.

On February 28, 2014, he signed with Darüşşafaka & Doğuş of the Turkish Basketball Second League for the rest of the season.

In July 2014, he returned to China and signed with Tianjin Ronggang.

On November 18, 2016, Douby was acquired by the Westchester Knicks of the NBA D-League. On December 12, he early terminated his contract with the Knicks after appearing in two games. On January 5, 2017, he signed with Turkish club Afyonkarahisar Belediyespor for the rest of the season.

In August 2017, he signed with Sporting Al Riyadi Beirut of the Lebanese Basketball League.

== Career statistics ==
Legend
GP	Games played	GS	Games started	MPG	Minutes per game
FG%	Field goal percentage	3P%	3-point field goal percentage	FT%	Free throw percentage
RPG	Rebounds per game	APG	Assists per game	SPG	Steals per game
BPG	Blocks per game	PPG	Points per game	**Bold**	Career high

=== NBA ===
==== Regular season ====
Year	Team	GP	GS	MPG	FG%	3P%	FT%	RPG	APG	SPG	BPG	PPG
2006–07	Sacramento	42	0	8.5	.381	.240	.733	.9	.4	**.4**	.1	2.8
2007–08	Sacramento	**74**	0	**11.8**	.394	.344	.923	1.1	.7	**.4**	**.2**	**4.8**
2008–09	Sacramento	20	0	11.4	.341	.270	**.933**	**1.3**	.7	.1	**.2**	4.2
2008–09	Toronto	7	0	10.4	**.545**	**.444**	.750	1.0	**1.7**	**.4**	.0	4.4
Career		143	0	10.7	.389	.312	.884	1.1	.7	.3	.1	4.1

=== Domestic leagues ===
Season	Team	League	GP	MPG	FG%	3P%	FT%	RPG	APG	SPG	BPG	PPG
2008–09	Erie Bayhawks	D-League	5	28.6	.575	.296	.870	3.6	1.8	1.2	.8	18.0
2009–10	Darüşşafaka Cooper Tires	TBL	21	35.5	.496	.316	.745	3.0	4.9	2.3	.7	23.6
2010–11	Xinjiang Flying Tigers	CBA	43	35.7	.620	.418	.899	4.2	4.6	3.7	.3	32.0
2011–12	UCAM Murcia	Liga ACB	9	22.3	.406	.326	.730	1.3	1.9	1.7	.5	13.4
2012–13	Zhejiang Golden Bulls	CBA	34	35.8	.572	.324	.857	3.7	4.4	2.4	.6	31.6
2012–13	Club Sagesse	FLB League	8	32.1	.471	.449	.903	2.9	4.6	1.9	.9	24.9
2013–14	ASU	Asia Champions Cup	5	33.0	.571	.290	.852	2.6	3.2	1.4	.4	21.2
2013–14	Sioux Falls Skyforce	D-League	2	34.5	.421	.400	.867	1.0	2.5	4.5	1.0	20.5
2013–14	Shanghai Sharks	CBA	30	39.3	.565	.317	.812	4.0	3.7	2.3	.6	28.8
2013–14	Darüşşafaka & Doğuş	TBL	14	30.9	.580	.379	.879	3.0	3.0	1.4	.7	20.6
2014–15	Tianjin Ronggang	CBA	16	35.8	.490	.348	.858	5.1	4.3	1.6	.4	30.9
