= 1980–81 Duquesne Dukes men's basketball team =

American college basketball season

1980–81 Duquesne Dukes men's basketball

Eastern 8 Regular Season co-champions

NIT, First round
- Conference: Eastern 8
- Record: 20–10 (10–3 Eastern 8)
- Head coach: Mike Rice (3rd season)
- Home arena: Civic Arena

1980–81 Eastern 8 men's basketball standings
	Conf.				Overall
Team	W		L	PCT	W		L	PCT
Rhode Island	10	–	3	.769	21	–	8	.724
Duquesne	10	–	3	.769	20	–	10	.667
West Virginia	9	–	4	.692	23	–	10	.697
Pittsburgh †	8	–	5	.615	19	–	12	.613
Rutgers	7	–	6	.538	16	–	14	.533
St. Bonaventure	6	–	7	.462	14	–	13	.519
George Washington	4	–	9	.308	8	–	19	.296
UMass	0	–	13	.000	3	–	24	.111
† 1981 Eastern 8 Tournament winner Rankings from AP Poll

The 1980–81 Duquesne Dukes men's basketball team represented Duquesne University in 1980–81 NCAA Division I men's basketball season.

== Roster ==
1980–81 Duquesne Dukes men's basketball team
Players
Coaches

Pos.	#	Name	Height	Weight	Year	Hometown
F	44	Bruce Atkins	6 ft 7 in (2.01 m)	210 lb (95 kg)	So	Wilkinsburg, Pennsylvania
G	22	Tom Cvitkovic	6 ft 3 in (1.91 m)	170 lb (77 kg)	Jr	Ambridge, Pennsylvania
G	20	Ronnie Dixon	6 ft 4 in (1.93 m)	160 lb (73 kg)	Sr	Macon, GA
G	21	Derrick Eaglin	6 ft 5 in (1.96 m)	210 lb (95 kg)	Fr	Washington, D. C.
G	23	John Farrell	6 ft 2 in (1.88 m)	190 lb (86 kg)	So	Pittsburgh, Pennsylvania
G	30	Tony Long	6 ft 2 in (1.88 m)	170 lb (77 kg)	Fr	Wheeling, West Virginia
F	24	Joey Myers	6 ft 7 in (2.01 m)	215 lb (98 kg)	So	Lower Burrell, Pennsylvania
G	12	Rod Scott	6 ft 4 in (1.93 m)	185 lb (84 kg)	Jr	Avalon, Pennsylvania
G	5	Andy Sisinni	6 ft 2 in (1.88 m)	170 lb (77 kg)	Fr	Erie, Pennsylvania
G	11	Terry Teachout	6 ft 1 in (1.85 m)	170 lb (77 kg)	So	Cleveland, Ohio
C	50	Ricky Tunstall	7 ft 0 in (2.13 m)	235 lb (107 kg)	So	Cleveland, Ohio
C	51	Dave Udanis	6 ft 11 in (2.11 m)	215 lb (98 kg)	Fr	Pittsburgh, Pennsylvania

Head coach

- Mike Rice

Assistant coach(es)

- Bruce Bauer

Legend

- (C) Team captain
- (S) Suspended
- (I) Ineligible
- (W) Walk-on
- Injured
- Current redshirt

== Schedule ==
Date time, TV	Rank^{#}	Opponent^{#}	Result	Record	Site city, state
Regular season
Dec 2, 1980*		Indiana (PA)	W 86–71	1–0	Civic Arena; Pittsburgh, Pennsylvania
Dec 6, 1980		at Rhode Island	L 61–65	1–1 (0–1)	Keaney Gymnasium; Kingston, Rhode Island
Dec 9, 1980*		Old Dominion	L 70–73	1–2	Civic Arena; Pittsburgh, Pennsylvania
Dec 11, 1980*		Robert Morris	W 83–59	2–2	Civic Arena; Pittsburgh, Pennsylvania
Dec 13, 1980*		at Canisius	W 82–57	3–2	Koessler Athletic Center; Buffalo, New York
Dec 19, 1980*		vs. Miami (OH); Golden Gate Tournament	W 97–59	4–2	War Memorial Gymnasium; San Francisco, California
Dec 20, 1980*		at San Francisco; Golden Gate Tournament	L 83–91 ^{OT}	4–3	War Memorial Gymnasium; San Francisco, California
Dec 22, 1980*		at San Jose State	L 60–82	4–4	San Jose Civic Auditorium; San Jose, California
Jan 8, 1981		George Washington	W 87–71	5–4 (1–1)	Civic Arena; Pittsburgh, Pennsylvania
Jan 12, 1981		at West Virginia	L 61–73	5–5 (1–2)	WVU Coliseum; Morgantown, West Virginia
Jan 15, 1981		UMass	W 99–69	6–5 (2–2)	Civic Arena; Pittsburgh, Pennsylvania
Jan 17, 1981		at George Washington	W 89–82	7–5 (3–2)	Charles E. Smith Center; Washington, D.C.
Jan 20, 1981		Rutgers	W 62–60	8–5 (4–2)	Civic Arena; Pittsburgh, Pennsylvania
Jan 22, 1981*		Cincinnati	W 85–77	9–5	Civic Arena; Pittsburgh, Pennsylvania
Jan 24, 1981*		Stetson	W 62–60	10–5	Civic Arena; Pittsburgh, Pennsylvania
Jan 28, 1981		at St. Bonaventure	W 75–73	11–5 (5–2)	Reilly Center; St. Bonaventure, New York
Feb 1, 1981*		Saint Francis	W 72–63	12–5	Civic Arena; Pittsburgh, Pennsylvania
Feb 4, 1981		at Pittsburgh	L 53–60	12–6 (5–3)	Fitzgerald Field House; Pittsburgh, Pennsylvania
Feb 7, 1981		at UMass	W 83–67	13–6 (6–3)	Curry Hicks Cage; Amherst, Massachusetts
Feb 9, 1981		West Virginia	W 69–64	14–6 (7–3)	Civic Arena; Pittsburgh, Pennsylvania
Feb 11, 1981*		at La Salle	L 62–66	14–7	Palestra; Philadelphia, Pennsylvania
Feb 15, 1981		Pittsburgh	W 66–64	15–7 (8–3)	Civic Arena; Pittsburgh, Pennsylvania
Feb 17, 1981*		Detroit	W 72–70	16–7	Civic Arena; Pittsburgh, Pennsylvania
Feb 20, 1981*		at Dayton	L 100–109 ^{3OT}	16–8	UD Arena; Dayton, Ohio
Feb 22, 1981		St. Bonaventure	W 79–72	17–8 (9–3)	Civic Arena; Pittsburgh, Pennsylvania
Feb 25, 1981		at Rutgers	W 69–68	18–8 (10–3)	Louis Brown Athletic Center; Piscataway, New Jersey
Eastern 8 Tournament
Mar 3, 1981*	(2)	(7) George Washington; Quarterfinals	W 84–78 ^{OT}	19–8	Civic Arena; Pittsburgh, Pennsylvania
Mar 6, 1981*	(2)	(3) West Virginia; Semifinals	W 55–50	20–8	Civic Arena; Pittsburgh, Pennsylvania
Mar 7, 1981*	(2)	(4) Pittsburgh; Finals	L 60–64	20–9	Civic Arena; Pittsburgh, Pennsylvania
NIT Tournament
Mar 12, 1981*		at Michigan; First round	L 58–74	20–10	Crisler Arena; Ann Arbor, Michigan
*Non-conference game. ^{#}Rankings from AP Poll. (#) Tournament seedings in parentheses. All times are in Eastern Time.
