= 1981 Eastern 8 men's basketball tournament =

- Classification: Division I
- Season: 1980–81
- Teams: 8
- Site: Civic Arena; Pittsburgh
- Champions: Pittsburgh (1st title)
- Winning coach: Roy Chipman (1st title)
- MVP: Lenny McMillan (Pittsburgh)

1980–81 Eastern 8 men's basketball standings
	Conf.				Overall
Team	W		L	PCT	W		L	PCT
Rhode Island	10	–	3	.769	21	–	8	.724
Duquesne	10	–	3	.769	20	–	10	.667
West Virginia	9	–	4	.692	23	–	10	.697
Pittsburgh †	8	–	5	.615	19	–	12	.613
Rutgers	7	–	6	.538	16	–	14	.533
St. Bonaventure	6	–	7	.462	14	–	13	.519
George Washington	4	–	9	.308	8	–	19	.296
UMass	0	–	13	.000	3	–	24	.111
† 1981 Eastern 8 Tournament winner Rankings from AP Poll

The 1981 Eastern 8 men's basketball tournament was held in Pittsburgh, Pennsylvania at the Civic Arena from March 3–7, 1981 (first round games were held at campus sites). Pittsburgh defeated Duquesne 64-60 to win their first tournament championship. Lenny McMillan of Pittsburgh was named the Most Outstanding Player of the tournament.

== Bracket ==
Quarterfinals; March 3, 1981
1	Rhode Island	53
8	Massachusetts	48
4	Pittsburgh	67
5	Rutgers	62
2	Duquesne	84
7	George Washington	78
3	West Virginia	64
6	St. Bonaventure	62

Semi-Finals; March 6, 1981
1	Rhode Island	45
4	Pittsburgh	74
2	Duquesne	55
3	West Virginia	50

Finals; March 7, 1981
4	Pittsburgh	64
2	Duquesne	60
