= Geo Baker =

Former American basketball player

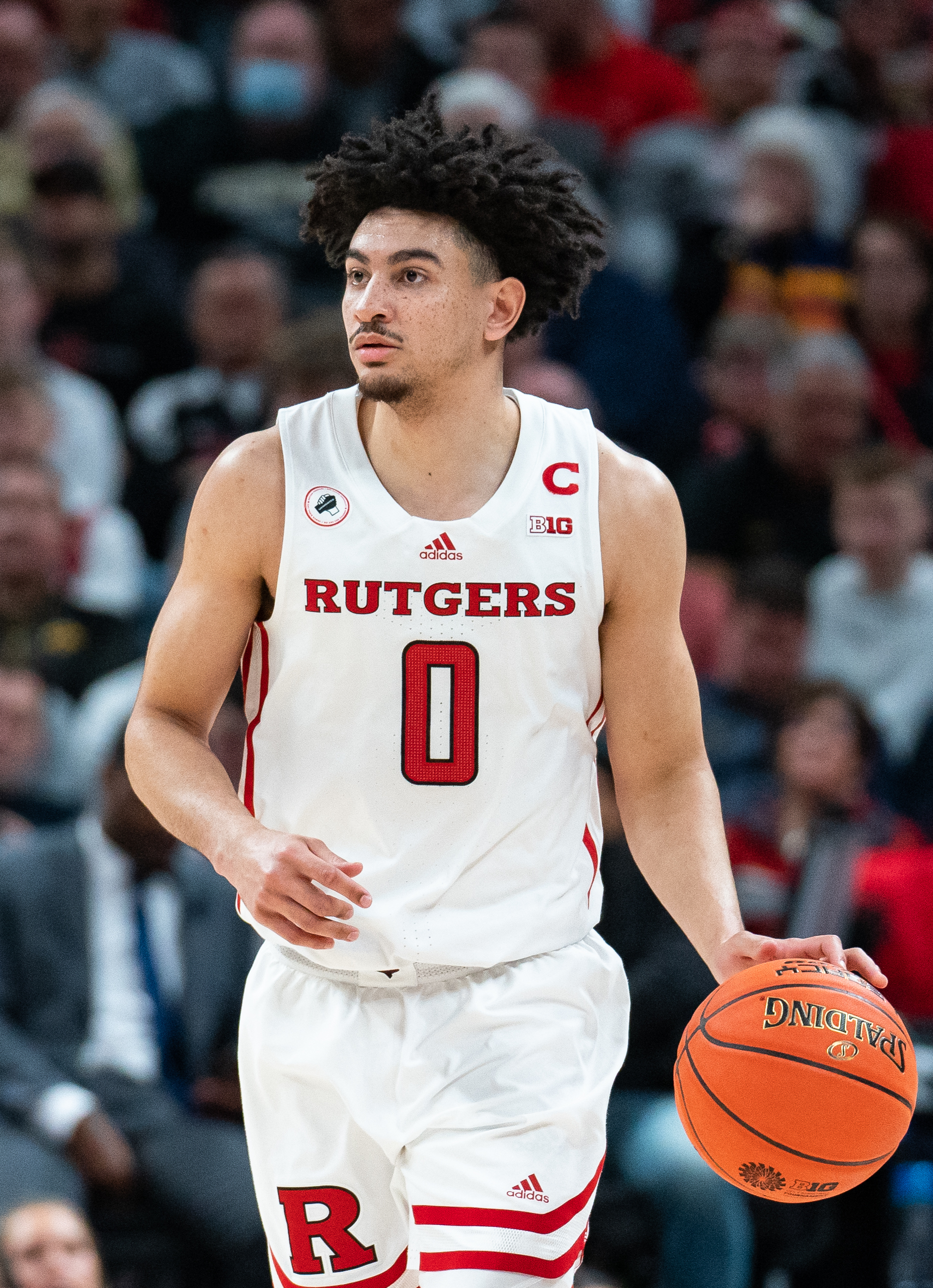
- Baker with Rutgers in 2022

Personal information
- Born: July 21, 1998 (age 28)
- Listed height: 6 ft 4 in (1.93 m)
- Listed weight: 185 lb (84 kg)

Career information
- High school: Buckingham Browne & Nichols (Cambridge, Massachusetts); Pinkerton Academy (Derry, New Hampshire); Proctor Academy (Andover, New Hampshire)
- College: Rutgers (2017–2022)
- Position: Point guard
- Number: 0

Career highlights
- 2× All-Big Ten – Coaches (2020, 2022)

Geordano "Geo" Baker-Occeus (born July 21, 1998) is an American former college basketball player for the Rutgers Scarlet Knights of the Big Ten Conference.

== Early life ==
Baker began playing basketball at age seven under the guidance of his mother, a former college player. In eighth grade, he played varsity basketball for Buckingham Browne & Nichols School in Cambridge, Massachusetts, standing 5 ft 6 in (1.68 m) and weighing 90 lbs (41 kg). At age 15, he grew about six inches to reach a height of 6 ft 3 in (1.91 m). For his sophomore season, Baker moved to Pinkerton Academy in Derry, New Hampshire to be closer to home. He averaged 14.2 points and eight assists per game, leading his team to the New Hampshire Division 1 title game. After drawing NCAA Division I interest, Baker transferred to Proctor Academy in Andover, New Hampshire. As a junior, he averaged 18 points, six assists and five rebounds per game, earning New England Preparatory School Athletic Council (NEPSAC) All-Class AA honors. In his senior season, Baker was named to the First Team NEPSAC Class AA All-New England. He played Amateur Athletic Union basketball for the DC Blue Devils, who did not compete at any major circuits. In high school, Baker also played soccer, which was the first sport he took interest in.

Baker was a consensus three-star recruit and was considered the third-best player from New Hampshire in the 2017 class by the New England Recruiting Report. His only high major NCAA Division I offers came from Rutgers and Kansas State. On July 27, 2016, following his junior season, Baker committed to play college basketball for Rutgers.

College recruiting
| Name | Hometown | School | Height | Weight | Commit date |
|---|---|---|---|---|---|
| Geo Baker; PG | Derry, NH | Proctor Academy (NH) | 6 ft 4 in (1.93 m) | 170 lb (77 kg) | Jul 27, 2016 |
| Geo Baker; PG | Recruit ratings: Rivals: 247Sports: ESPN: (79) | | | | |
Overall recruit ranking: Rivals: — 247Sports: — ESPN: —
Note: In many cases, Scout, Rivals, 247Sports, On3, and ESPN may conflict in their listings of height and weight.; In these cases, the average was taken. ESPN grades are on a 100-point scale.; Sources: "Rutgers 2017 Basketball Commitments". Rivals.; "2017 Rutgers Scarlet Knights Recruiting Class". ESPN.; "2017 Team Ranking". Rivals.

== College career ==
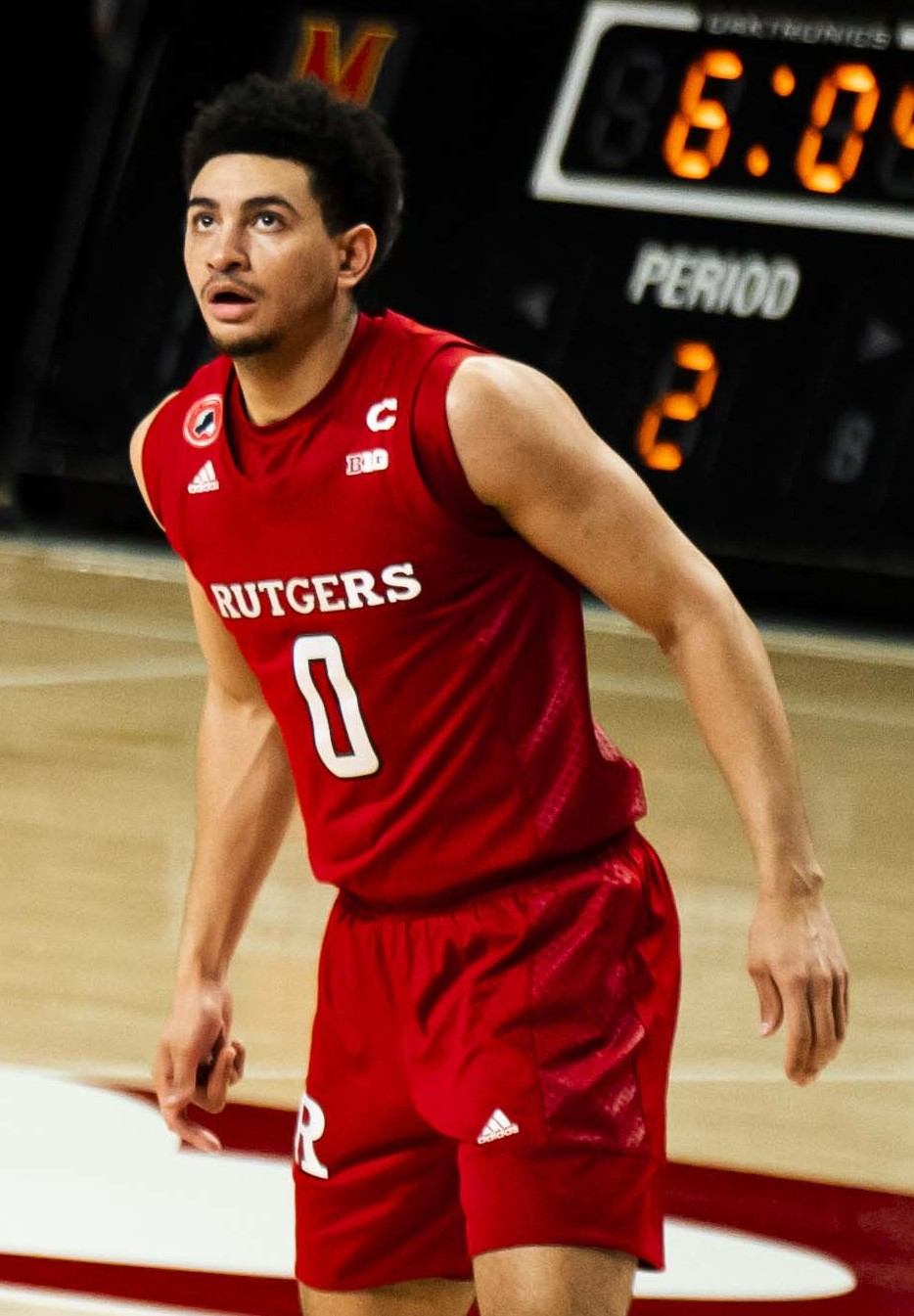
Baker with Rutgers in 2020

As a freshman, Baker was a regular starter for Rutgers, joining Corey Sanders in the backcourt. On November 21, 2017, he scored a career-high 29 points, shooting 7–of–10 from three-point range, in an 83–54 win over Bryant. He recorded the most single-game points and three-pointers by a Rutgers freshman since Todd Billet in 2000. On December 9, Baker posted his first double-double with 19 points and 11 assists in a 92–54 victory over Fairleigh Dickinson. In his freshman season, he averaged 10.9 points, 2.6 assists and 2.2 rebounds per game and was named Metropolitan Basketball Writers Association Rookie of the Year.

As a sophomore, Baker averaged 12.2 points, 4.1 assists and 3.1 rebounds per game, and ranked second in the Big Ten with 1.6 steals per game. He was an All-Big Ten honorable mention and a third-team All-Met selection. Baker missed three games in January 2020 with a thumb injury. On January 25, 2020, in his junior season, Baker made a game-winning three-pointer with 1.2 seconds remaining to help defeat Nebraska, 75–72. On February 9, he scored a season-high 25 points, 23 of which came after halftime, along with six rebounds and five assists in a 77–73 overtime victory over Northwestern. As a junior, Baker averaged 10.9 points, 3.5 assists and three rebounds per game, earning third-team All-Big Ten honors from the league's coaches and first-team All-Met.

In Baker's senior season debut on November 25, 2020, he sprained his ankle in a win over Sacred Heart and was ruled out for several games. Baker was named to the third-team All-Big Ten by the coaches.

== Post-playing career ==
In May 2022, Baker announced that he was retiring from basketball to work on a full time NFT Technology project with another former Rutgers athlete Eric LeGrand. The project, called "Knight Society" aims to connect Rutgers alumni, students, and athletes. In an interview with NJ.com, Baker that "It wasn't a quick decision...This was something I thought about for a while. I found a new passion, and one thing that COVID-19 taught me is, you do what you love."

== Career statistics ==
Legend
| GP | Games played | GS | Games started | MPG | Minutes per game |
| FG% | Field goal percentage | 3P% | 3-point field goal percentage | FT% | Free throw percentage |
| RPG | Rebounds per game | APG | Assists per game | SPG | Steals per game |
| BPG | Blocks per game | PPG | Points per game | **Bold** | Career high |

=== College ===
| Year | Team | GP | GS | MPG | FG% | 3P% | FT% | RPG | APG | SPG | BPG | PPG |
|---|---|---|---|---|---|---|---|---|---|---|---|---|
| 2017–18 | Rutgers | **33** | 29 | 31.6 | .380 | **.361** | **.785** | 2.2 | 2.6 | 1.1 | .4 | 10.8 |
| 2018–19 | Rutgers | 31 | **30** | 34.0 | .354 | .341 | .741 | **3.1** | **4.1** | **1.6** | .5 | 12.2 |
| 2019–20 | Rutgers | 28 | 19 | 28.9 | .399 | .280 | .772 | 3.0 | 3.5 | 1.1 | **.6** | 10.9 |
| 2020–21 | Rutgers | 25 | 22 | 31.2 | **.409** | .303 | .750 | **3.1** | 3.2 | 1.2 | .4 | 10.4 |
| 2021–22 | Rutgers | 28 | 27 | **34.4** | .398 | .331 | .741 | 2.1 | 3.9 | 1.2 | .4 | **12.6** |
| Career | | 145 | 127 | 32.1 | .386 | .326 | .758 | 2.7 | 3.4 | 1.2 | .5 | 11.4 |

== Personal life ==
Baker's mother, Irene, was the women's basketball team captain at the Massachusetts Institute of Technology in the 1990s. His father, who Baker does not have a close relationship with, played professional soccer.
