= Bob Lloyd (basketball) =

American basketball player (born 1945)

Personal information
- Born: October 5, 1945 (age 81) Upper Darby Township, Pennsylvania, U.S.
- Listed height: 6 ft 2 in (1.88 m)
- Listed weight: 184 lb (83 kg)

Career information
- High school: Upper Darby (Upper Darby Township, Pennsylvania)
- College: Rutgers (1964–1967)
- NBA draft: 1967: 7th round, 69th overall pick
- Drafted by: Detroit Pistons
- Playing career: 1967–1969
- Position: Point guard
- Number: 3

Career history
- 1967–1969: New Jersey Americans / New York Nets

Career highlights
- Consensus first-team All-American (1967); No. 14 retired by Rutgers Scarlet Knights

Career ABA statistics
- Points: 1,127
- Rebounds: 220
- Assists: 229
- Stats at Basketball Reference

Robert E. Lloyd (born October 5, 1945) is an American former professional basketball player in the American Basketball Association (ABA), even though he was drafted by the NBA's Detroit Pistons in the seventh round of the 1967 NBA draft. Lloyd began his ABA career with the New Jersey Americans; the team became the New York Nets in 1968 (and is now the NBA's Brooklyn Nets). In two ABA seasons, Lloyd scored 1,127 points in his career, good for a 9.0 points per game average.

At Rutgers University, Lloyd became the Scarlet Knights' first ever First Team All-American. He still holds the school record for career scoring average (26.5 ppg), and as a senior in 1966–67 he led NCAA Division I in free throw percentage (.921), making 255-of-277 attempts. Also in that season, Lloyd coupled with fellow guard and college roommate Jim Valvano to lead Rutgers to their first-ever postseason basketball tournament, the 1967 National Invitation Tournament, where they defeated University of New Mexico 65–60 to reach the Final Four of the tournament. They defeated Marshall 93–76 in the third place game, after losing to Walt Frazier's Southern Illinois Salukis. In 1987, Lloyd became the first Rutgers athlete to have his jersey retired.

After basketball, Lloyd went on to become a successful businessman. He was the president and CEO of Data East, Incorporated before becoming the chairman and CEO of Mindscape, a publisher of consumer software. Since 1994, he has served as chairman of the board for The V Foundation For Cancer Research, which was started by his friend and teammate Jim Valvano as he was battling cancer which ultimately claimed his life. Lloyd has helped raise over $70 million since that time. Today, Lloyd is retired besides his work at The V Foundation and resides in Los Altos Hills, California.

== Career statistics ==
Legend
GP	Games played	GS	Games started	MPG	Minutes per game
FG%	Field goal percentage	3P%	3-point field goal percentage	FT%	Free throw percentage
RPG	Rebounds per game	APG	Assists per game	SPG	Steals per game
BPG	Blocks per game	PPG	Points per game	**Bold**	Career high

=== ABA ===
==== Regular season ====
Year	Team	GP	MPG	FG%	3P%	FT%	RPG	APG	PPG
1967–68	New Jersey	58	17.2	**.421**	.375	.854	**1.9**	1.6	8.1
1968–69	N.Y. Nets	**67**	**20.3**	.397	**.387**	**.886**	1.7	**2.0**	**9.9**
Career		125	18.8	.407	.385	.872	1.8	1.8	9.0
