= Hollis Copeland =

American basketball player

Personal information
- Born: December 20, 1955 (age 70) Trenton, New Jersey, U.S.
- Listed height: 6 ft 6 in (1.98 m)
- Listed weight: 180 lb (82 kg)

Career information
- High school: Ewing (Ewing Township, New Jersey)
- College: Rutgers (1974–1978)
- NBA draft: 1978: 3rd round, 46th overall pick
- Drafted by: Denver Nuggets
- Playing career: 1979–1990
- Position: Small forward
- Number: 45

Career history
- 1979–1980: New York Knicks
- 1980–1981: Helios-Skol
- 1981–1982: New York Knicks
- 1982–1983: Albany Patroons
- 1983–1984: San Javier de Puerto Montt
- 1986: Staten Island Stallions
- 1987: Miami Tropics
- 1990: New York Whitecaps
- Stats at NBA.com
- Stats at Basketball Reference

Hollis Alphonso Copeland (born December 20, 1955) is an American former professional basketball player.

== Biography ==
Born in Trenton, New Jersey, he was a 6-foot-6-inch (1.98 m) and 180-pound (82 kg) small forward who grew up in Ewing Township, New Jersey and played high school basketball at Ewing High School and college basketball at Rutgers University.

Copeland was selected with the second pick of the third round in the 1978 NBA draft by the Denver Nuggets, but was cut during camp. He signed on with the New York Knicks and appeared in two seasons with them (in 1979–80 and 1981–82), but his career was hampered in his second Knicks season, after he dislocated several bones in his foot during practice. Copeland played for the Albany Patroons of the Continental Basketball Association (CBA) during the 1982–83 season.

After his basketball career, he became a hospital-care investigator, a sales representative and a stockbroker.

== Career statistics ==
Legend
GP	Games played	GS	Games started	MPG	Minutes per game
FG%	Field goal percentage	3P%	3-point field goal percentage	FT%	Free throw percentage
RPG	Rebounds per game	APG	Assists per game	SPG	Steals per game
BPG	Blocks per game	PPG	Points per game	**Bold**	Career high

=== NBA ===
==== Regular season ====
Year	Team	GP	GS	MPG	FG%	3P%	FT%	RPG	APG	SPG	BPG	PPG
1979–80	New York	**75**		**15.2**	**.495**	.000	.733	**2.1**	**1.1**	**.8**	**.3**	**5.7**
1981–82	New York	18	0	6.6	.421	–	**.833**	.3	.5	.2	.1	2.1
Career		93	0	13.5	.488	.000	.739	1.7	1.0	.7	.3	5.0
