= Phil Sellers =

American basketball player (1953–2023)

Personal information
- Born: November 20, 1953 Brooklyn, New York, U.S.
- Died: September 19, 2023 (aged 69) Livingston, New Jersey, U.S.
- Listed height: 6 ft 4 in (1.93 m)
- Listed weight: 195 lb (88 kg)

Career information
- High school: Thomas Jefferson (Brooklyn, New York)
- College: Rutgers (1972–1976)
- NBA draft: 1976: 3rd round, 48th overall pick
- Drafted by: Detroit Pistons
- Playing career: 1976–1979
- Position: Small forward / shooting guard
- Number: 11

Career history
- 1976–1977: Detroit Pistons
- 1978: Jersey Shore Bullets
- 1978–1979: BV Amstelveen

Career highlights
- Consensus second-team All-American (1976); Third-team All-American – AP (1975); 2× Haggerty Award winner (1975, 1976); No. 12 retired by Rutgers Scarlet Knights; Third-team Parade All-American (1972)
- Stats at NBA.com
- Stats at Basketball Reference

Phillip Sellers Jr. (November 20, 1953 – September 19, 2023) was an American professional basketball player for the Detroit Pistons of the National Basketball Association (NBA).

== Amateur career ==
Born in Brooklyn, New York, Sellers played high school basketball at Thomas Jefferson High School in Brooklyn. He achieved success at the prep level, winning the MVP Award of Pittsburgh's Dapper Dan Tournament, a tournament with the nation's top high school players, at the end of his senior season. He also earned Third-Team Parade All-American honors at Jefferson and received over 200 scholarship offers from colleges across the country to play basketball. Sellers signed a letter of intent to play at Notre Dame, but academic concerns made him reconsider and so he attended Livingston College in New Jersey, a part of Rutgers University specially designed to help students from low-income backgrounds.

At Rutgers, Sellers was recruited by and played under then-assistant coach and future college basketball legend Dick Vitale. His decision to become a Scarlet Knight was initially criticized as Rutgers was a small, unheralded and independent program at the time but Sellers found instant success, averaging 19.5 ppg in his freshman season, helping lead Rutgers to the 1973 National Invitation Tournament (NIT) and then following that up in his second season with 23.2 ppg and another NIT appearance.

Sellers and Rutgers continued their winning ways in 1974–75, finishing with a 22–7 record and the first NCAA Tournament appearance, losing a first-round game to Louisville 91–78 with Sellers scoring 29 points.

Rutgers took another step in 1975–76. Sellers, a senior and Consensus Second Team All-American, led the team to a 31–0 start, averaging a double-double of 19.2 ppg and 10.2 rpg. The Scarlet Knights advanced to the NCAA Tournament, winning games over Princeton 54–53, Connecticut 93–79, and VMI 91–75 to advance to the Final Four. The team finished 31–2, with their only two losses occurring in the national semifinals, 86–70 to Michigan and then the third-place game to UCLA 106–92. Sellers graduated from Rutgers in 1976 and is still the school's all-time leading scorer (2,399) and rebounder (1,115). On January 16, 1988, he had his jersey number (#12) retired, making him one of only three Scarlet Knights players to have ever been so honored.

== Professional career ==
After graduating from Rutgers, Sellers was picked in the third round (38th overall) of the 1976 NBA draft by the Detroit Pistons. The 6'4" Sellers changed to the guard position, having played forward in college, and struggled with the increased ball-handling responsibilities. Sellers said, "I couldn't play guard. They had doubts. Even me, I had doubts." Sellers spent the year with Detroit, playing the tumultuous 1976-77 Detroit Pistons season with Marvin "Bad News" Barnes, averaging 4.5 ppg in 44 games. He was released prior to the following season.

After his release by Detroit, Sellers played for the Jersey Shore Bullets in the Continental Basketball Association and then for BV Amstelveen in the Netherlands. He tried out for the Pistons again in 1979, under his former assistant coach at Rutgers Dick Vitale, but was cut before the season began.

== Personal life ==
Sellers returned to Rutgers as an assistant coach for four years in the 1980s before moving to work in the private sector. Sellers was inducted into the New York City Basketball Hall of Fame in 2010 and the Rutgers Athletics Hall of Fame in 1993. Former Rutgers President Dr. Edward J. Bloustein, said of Sellers that he "epitomized and symbolized in ways that people who gain the public eye sometimes do, a movement at Rutgers toward quality and self-assurance. He helped instill a sense of confidence in the university that persists today."

Phil Sellers died in Livingston, New Jersey from a stroke on September 19, 2023, at the age of 69.

== Career statistics ==
Legend
GP	Games played	GS	Games started	MPG	Minutes per game
FG%	Field goal percentage	3P%	3-point field goal percentage	FT%	Free throw percentage
RPG	Rebounds per game	APG	Assists per game	SPG	Steals per game
BPG	Blocks per game	PPG	Points per game	**Bold**	Career high

=== NBA ===
==== Regular season ====
Year	Team	GP	MPG	FG%	FT%	RPG	APG	SPG	BPG	PPG
1976–77	Detroit	44	7.5	.384	.722	.9	.6	.5	.0	4.5

==== Playoffs ====
Year	Team	GP	MPG	FG%	FT%	RPG	APG	SPG	BPG	PPG
1977	Detroit	1	6.0	.250	.250	2.0	.0	.0	.0	3.0

== See also ==
- List of NCAA Division I men's basketball players with 2000 points and 1000 rebounds
