= James Bailey (basketball) =

American basketball player (born 1957)

Personal information
- Born: May 21, 1957 (age 69) Dublin, Georgia, U.S.
- Listed height: 6 ft 9 in (2.06 m)
- Listed weight: 220 lb (100 kg)

Career information
- High school: Xaverian Brothers (Westwood, Massachusetts)
- College: Rutgers (1975–1979)
- NBA draft: 1979: 1st round, 6th overall pick
- Drafted by: Seattle SuperSonics
- Playing career: 1979–1990
- Position: Power forward / center
- Number: 20, 33, 2, 6, 54, 27

Career history
- 1979–1981: Seattle SuperSonics
- 1981–1982: New Jersey Nets
- 1982–1984: Houston Rockets
- 1984–1986: New York Knicks
- 1986–1987: New Jersey Nets
- 1987–1988: Phoenix Suns
- 1988–1989: Glaxo Verona
- 1990: Turboair Fabriano

Career highlights
- Third-team All-American – UPI (1979); Second-team All-American – UPI (1978); Third-team All-American – NABC (1978); 2× Eastern 8 Player of the Year (1978, 1979); No. 20 retired by Rutgers Scarlet Knights

Career NBA statistics
- Points: 5,246 (8.8 ppg)
- Rebounds: 2,988 (5.0 rpg)
- Blocks: 521 (0.9 bpg)
- Stats at NBA.com
- Stats at Basketball Reference

James L. Bailey (born May 21, 1957) is an American former professional basketball player. A 6-foot-9-inch (2.06 m) forward/center from Rutgers University, he was selected with the 6th pick of the 1979 NBA draft by the Seattle SuperSonics. Nicknamed "Jammin' James," he spent 9 seasons (1979–1988) in the National Basketball Association (NBA), playing for the Sonics as well as the New Jersey Nets, Houston Rockets, New York Knicks, and Phoenix Suns. He ended his NBA career with 5,246 total points.

While at Rutgers, Bailey was a formidable player, displaying a strong inside presence in addition to possessing great leaping ability. He was famous for his conversion of "alley-oop" passes into slam dunks. The rule allowing dunking was re-instituted in college basketball beginning with the 1976–77 season, Bailey's sophomore year. Bailey's slam dunks were an immediate sensation at Rutgers, and Bailey led the team with 88 dunks as a sophomore. He increased this number to 116 as a junior. However, as a senior, he was met with constant double and triple teaming, and Rutgers' opponents "held" him to 79 dunks as a senior.

The Scarlet Knights advanced to the NCAA basketball Final Four in 1976, Bailey's freshman year, arriving with a 31–0 record. However, they were defeated by Michigan in the national semi finals, and then lost to UCLA in the 3rd place (consolation) game.

Bailey is number three on the Rutgers all-time scoring list (2,034 points), and second in career rebounds behind Phil Sellers (1,047). He is also the second leading shot-blocker in Rutgers history behind Roy Hinson.

Bailey went on to capture All-America honors from UPI and The Sporting News in 1978.

Bailey's #20 jersey was retired by Rutgers in 1993, and he was inducted into the Rutgers Hall of Fame in the same year.

== Career statistics ==
Legend
GP	Games played	GS	Games started	MPG	Minutes per game
FG%	Field goal percentage	3P%	3-point field goal percentage	FT%	Free throw percentage
RPG	Rebounds per game	APG	Assists per game	SPG	Steals per game
BPG	Blocks per game	PPG	Points per game	**Bold**	Career high

=== NBA ===
==== Regular season ====
Year	Team	GP	GS	MPG	FG%	3P%	FT%	RPG	APG	SPG	BPG	PPG
1979–80	Seattle	67		10.8	.450	–	.673	2.9	.4	.3	.8	4.7
1980–81	Seattle	**82**		**31.0**	.499	**.500**	.709	**7.4**	1.2	**.9**	**1.7**	14.0
1981–82	Seattle	10	0	18.0	.477	–	.364	4.8	**1.3**	.3	.7	6.6
1981–82	New Jersey	67	0	19.2	**.523**	–	.624	5.1	.8	.6	1.1	8.9
1982–83	New Jersey	6	0	8.3	.500	–	**1.000**	1.0	.3	.2	.2	3.3
1982–83	Houston	69	**39**	24.9	.497	.000	.700	6.8	.9	.6	.9	**14.1**
1983–84	Houston	73	0	16.1	.491	.000	.719	4.0	1.1	.5	.5	8.8
1984–85	New York	74	28	17.5	.447	.000	.676	4.6	.5	.4	.7	5.2
1985–86	New York	48	36	25.9	.456	.000	.772	7.0	1.0	.7	.8	11.1
1986–87	New Jersey	34	2	15.9	.469	–	.725	4.0	.6	.4	.7	8.3
1987–88	Phoenix	65	0	13.4	.452	.000	.787	3.2	.6	.3	.4	4.4
Career		595	105	19.5	.484	.077	.703	5.0	.8	.5	.9	8.8

==== Playoffs ====
Year	Team	GP	MPG	FG%	3P%	FT%	RPG	APG	SPG	BPG	PPG
1980	Seattle	**12**	11.5	**.477**	–	.650	2.1	.4	.8	**.8**	**4.6**
1982	New Jersey	2	**13.0**	.333	–	**1.000**	**3.0**	**.5**	**1.0**	.5	2.0
Career		14	11.7	.468	–	.682	2.2	.4	.8	.7	4.2

== See also ==
- List of NCAA Division I men's basketball players with 2000 points and 1000 rebounds
