= Rutgers Scarlet Knights men's basketball =

Men's basketball team of Rutgers University

2026–27 Rutgers Scarlet Knights men's basketball team
- University: Rutgers University
- First season: 1906–07; 120 years ago
- Athletic director: Keli Zinn
- Head coach: Steve Pikiell; 11th season, 161–159 (.503)
- Location: Piscataway, New Jersey
- Arena: Jersey Mike's Arena (capacity: 8,000)
- NCAA division: Division I
- Conference: Big Ten
- Nickname: Scarlet Knights
- Colors: Scarlet
- All-time record: 1,357–1,317 (.507)
- NCAA tournament record: 6–9 (.400)

NCAA Division I tournament Final Four
- 1976
Other NCAA Division I tournament results
Elite Eight	1976
Sweet Sixteen	1976, 1979
Appearances	1975, 1976, 1979, 1983, 1989, 1991, 2021, 2022

Conference tournament champions
- ECAC: 1975, 1976 A-10: 1979, 1989

Conference regular-season champions
- Middle Three: 1943, 1949, 1950, 1951 A-10: 1977, 1978, 1980, 1983, 1991

Uniforms
Home	Away

The Rutgers Scarlet Knights men's basketball team represents Rutgers University in NCAA Division I college basketball competition and competes in the Big Ten Conference. Rutgers made the NCAA Final Four in 1976. Rutgers has appeared in the NCAA tournament eight times, most recently appearing in 2022. Rutgers has produced many NBA players, most notably Roy Hinson, John Battle, and James Bailey. In 2025, Dylan Harper and Ace Bailey made history as the highest-selected Scarlet Knights in NBA Draft history, with the second and fifth picks, respectively.

== History ==
The history of Rutgers men's basketball dates back to 1906 when they began their first season of play. Their first recorded game was a loss to New York University by a score of 38–16. The team was dissolved following the 1907-1908 season, only to be reformed in 1913 where they remained intact uninterrupted until the 1943 season.

The team played in the Final Four in the 1976 NCAA tournament and ended the 1976 season ranked fourth in the nation, after a 86–70 loss against the Michigan Wolverines in the semifinal round and a 106–92 loss to the UCLA Bruins in the tournament's third-place consolation game. This was the last men's Division I tournament to date to feature two unbeaten teams, as both Indiana, who won that year's title, and Rutgers entered the tournament unbeaten. Rutgers went 31–0 during the regular season.

The Scarlet Knights also played in the championship game of the 2004 NIT Final, losing to the Michigan Wolverines 62–55.

The Scarlet Knights had a prolonged down period through the following decade, cycling through a number of coaches and routinely finishing at the bottom of the Big East standings. This period included a scandal in 2013 with then head coach Mike Rice Jr. being shown on video verbally and physically abusing players. The scandal resulted in the firing of Coach Rice as well as the resignation of then Rutgers athletic director Tim Pernetti.

Rutgers basketball played their first season in the Big Ten conference in 2014–2015. After the hiring of Head Coach Steve Pikiell in 2016, the program began to see renewed success. In the 2019–20 season, led by guards Geo Baker and Ron Harper Jr., the Scarlet Knights reached the 20-win mark for the first time since the 2003-04 season, including an 18–1 home record and four wins against ranked opponents. That year, they ranked in the top 25 of the AP men's college basketball poll for the first time since 1979. Experts widely predicted Rutgers' inclusion in the 2020 NCAA tournament, but the event was cancelled before the field was announced as a result of the COVID-19 pandemic. The following season, the team would officially break its 30-year tournament drought when it earned a 10-seed in the 2021 NCAA tournament, where it would also achieve its first tournament win since 1983 in a first round win over Clemson. The Scarlet Knights returned to the tournament again the next season, becoming the team with the lowest NET (NCAA Evaluation Tool) ranking at 77th overall to receive an at-large bid since the NCAA has utilized the NET to inform tournament selection choices.

In 2024, the Scarlet Knights got two McDonald's All-American players: forward Airious "Ace" Bailey and guard Dylan Harper. Though they failed to reach the NCAA Tournament, this was seen as a success for Rutgers for getting two of the top three high school prospects.

== Postseason ==
=== NCAA tournament results ===
The Scarlet Knights have appeared in the NCAA tournament eight times. Their combined record is 6–9.

Year	Seed	Round	Opponent	Result
1975		First Round	Louisville	L 78–91
1976		First Round; Sweet Sixteen; Elite Eight; Final Four; National 3rd Place Game	Princeton; Connecticut; VMI; Michigan; UCLA	W 54–53; W 93–79; W 91–75; L 70–86; L 92–106
1979	#6	Second Round; Sweet Sixteen	#3 Georgetown #10 St. John's	W 64–58; L 65–67
1983	#9	First Round; Second Round	#8 Southwest Louisiana #1 St. John's	W 60–53; L 55–66
1989	#13	First Round	#4 Iowa	L 73–87
1991	#9	First Round	#8 Arizona State	L 76–79
2021	#10	First Round; Second Round	#7 Clemson #2 Houston	W 60–56; L 60–63
2022	#11	First Four	#11 Notre Dame	L 87–89 ^{2OT}

=== NIT results ===
The Scarlet Knights have appeared in the National Invitation Tournament (NIT) 15 times. Their combined record is 16–15.

Year	Round	Opponent	Result
1967	First Round; Quarterfinals; Semifinals; 3rd Place Game	Utah State; New Mexico; Southern Illinois; Marshall	W 78–76; W 65–60; L 70–79; W 93–76
1969	First Round	Tennessee	L 51–67
1973	First Round	Minnesota	L 59–68
1974	First Round	Utah	L 89–102
1977	First Round	St. Bonaventure	L 77–79
1978	First Round; Quarterfinals; Semifinals; 3rd Place Game	Army; Indiana State; Texas; Georgetown	W 72–70; W 57–56; L 76–96; W 85–72
1982	First Round; Second Round	Iona; Purdue	W 55–51; L 65–98
1990	First Round; Second Round; Quarterfinals	Holy Cross; Fordham; Penn State	W 87–78; W 81–74; L 55–58
1992	First Round; Second Round	James Madison; Manhattan	W 73–69; L 61–62
1999	First Round; Second Round	Hofstra; Clemson	W 58–45; L 68–78
2000	First Round	Kent State	L 62–73
2002	First Round	Yale	L 65–67
2004	First Round; Second Round; Quarterfinals; Semifinals; Final	Temple; West Virginia; Villanova; Iowa State; Michigan	W 76–71; W 67–64; W 72–60; W 84–81; L 55–62
2006	Opening Round; First Round	Penn State; Saint Joseph's	W 76–71; L 62–71
2023	First Round	Hofstra	L 86–88^{OT}

=== CBC results ===
The Scarlet Knights have appeared in one College Basketball Crown (CBC). Their record is 0–1.

Year	Round	Opponent	Result
2026	Quarterfinals	Creighton	L 69–82

== Retired numbers ==
Three Rutgers players have had their numbers retired:

No.	Player	Pos.	Tenure
12	Phil Sellers	SF	1972–1976
14	Bob Lloyd	G	1964–1967
20	James Bailey	PF	1975–1979

== Scarlet Knights in the NBA ==
23 Rutgers alumni have been selected in the NBA draft. Dylan Harper is the highest selected Scarlet Knight ever in the draft being selected as 2nd overall in the 2025 NBA Draft.

19 Rutgers alumni have played at least one game in the NBA, including:

- Bob Lloyd, 1968–1969
- Bob Greacen, 1970–1972
- Phil Sellers, 1977
- Eddie Jordan, 1978–1984
- Hollis Copeland, 1980–1982
- James Bailey, 1980–1988
- Roy Hinson, 1984–1991
- John Battle, 1986–1995
- Charles Jones, 1999–2000
- Dahntay Jones, 2004–2017
- Luis Flores, 2005
- Quincy Douby, 2007–2009
- Hamady N'Diaye, 2011–2014
- Eugene Omoruyi, 2022–2023
- Ron Harper Jr., 2023-present
- Caleb McConnell, 2023
- Cam Spencer, 2024-present
- Dylan Harper, 2025-present
- Ace Bailey, 2025-present

== Players in international competition ==
- Junior Etou (born 1994), Congolese basketball player for Hapoel Be'er Sheva of the Israeli Basketball Premier League
- Steve Kaplan, American-Israeli basketball player in the Israel Basketball Premier League
