= Terrell Miller =

Terrell Miller is the name of:

- Terrell Miller (basketball) (born 1995), American basketball player
- Terrell Miller (footballer) (born 1994), Montserratian footballer
