= Daxter Miles Jr. =

American basketball player (born 1996)

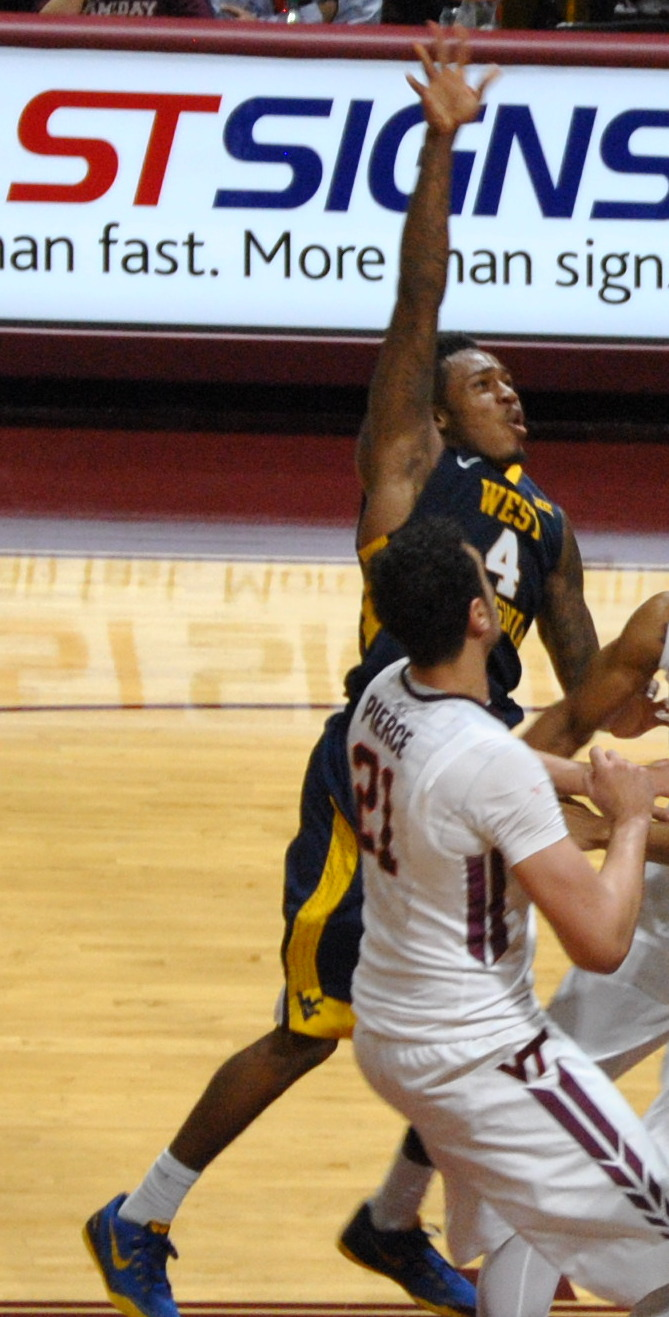
- Miles (#4) playing for West Virginia

Personal information
- Born: January 5, 1996 (age 30)
- Listed height: 6 ft 3 in (1.91 m)
- Listed weight: 200 lb (91 kg)

Career information
- High school: Archbishop Curley (Baltimore, Maryland); IMG Academy (Bradenton, Florida); Dunbar (Baltimore, Maryland)
- College: West Virginia (2014–2018)
- NBA draft: 2018: undrafted
- Playing career: 2018–2022
- Position: Shooting guard

Career history
- 2018–2020: Northern Arizona Suns
- 2020–2022: Fort Wayne Mad Ants
- 2022: Wisconsin Herd
- 2022: Salt Lake City Stars
- 2022: Orthodox Club

Daxter Alexander Miles (born January 5, 1996) is an American former professional basketball player. He played college basketball for the West Virginia Mountaineers.

== High school career ==
Miles was born on January 5, 1996, the son of Daxter Miles Sr, who played basketball as a youth, and Renee Reid. He has a twin sister, Diamond. The younger Miles grew up at 240 Bond Street in East Baltimore and has a "240" tattoo. Miles played two years of high school basketball at Archbishop Curley High School and one at IMG Academy in Florida. As a senior, he transferred to Dunbar High School where he was coached by Cyrus Jones, a friend of his father's. He led the Poets to a Class 1A state basketball championship and scored 15 points in the title game. He was named to The Baltimore Sun All-Metro First Team. Michael Carvelli described him as "a prep star who focused much of his energy on the different ways he could find his way into the scoring column."

== College career ==
Miles committed to play for the West Virginia Mountaineers and coach Bob Huggins over offers from Oklahoma State and Kansas State. He averaged 7.3 points, 2.3 rebounds and 1.1 steals per game as a freshman. In the 2015 NCAA tournament, Miles guaranteed that West Virginia would defeat the Kentucky Wildcats, who were 36–0 at the time, but however, Kentucky defeated West Virginia with a 78–39 rout. As a sophomore, Miles registered 9.4 points and 2.1 rebounds per game.

As a junior, he posted averages of 8.8 points, 1.6 assists, 2.5 rebounds, and 1.4 steals per game. Coming into his senior season, Miles was on the Jerry West Award watchlist. In November 2017, Miles scored 26 points in an 83–79 win over Missouri in the AdvoCare Invitational finals. He became the 52nd member of the 1,000 points club in a win against Coppin State on December 21. As a senior, he was named to the Big 12 Conference All-Tournament team after scoring 66 points en route to a runner-up showing. Miles averaged 12.8 points, 2.8 rebounds, and 3.1 assists per game, shooting 44.6 percent from the floor and 34.3 percent from behind the arc. In his career he started 124 games, second in West Virginia history to Johannes Herber.

== Professional career ==
=== Northern Arizona Suns (2018–2020) ===
Miles was signed to a two-way contract by the Sacramento Kings after going undrafted in the 2018 NBA draft. He was selected with the 11th overall pick by the Iowa Wolves in the 2018 NBA G League draft. Miles was traded to the Northern Arizona Suns in exchange for Xavier Silas, Roddy Peters, and a second round pick in the 2019 NBA G League draft. In his debut with the Suns, Miles scored 19 points on 7-of-14 shooting. Miles averaged 15.0 points, 3.2 rebounds, 2.2 assists, and 1.1 steals in 21 games in his second season in Northern Arizona.

=== Fort Wayne Mad Ants (2020–2022) ===
On January 9, 2020, Miles was traded to the Fort Wayne Mad Ants in exchange for Ike Nwamu. He had 21 points in his first game for the Mad Ants, a 113–105 win over the Capital City Go-Go. He became the only player from the team to return for the 2021–2022 season. The Mad Ants waived Miles on February 3, 2022.

=== Wisconsin Herd (2022) ===
On February 12, 2022, Miles was acquired by the Wisconsin Herd from the available player pool. Miles was then later waived on February 25, 2022.

=== Salt Lake City Stars (2022) ===
On March 1, 2022, Miles was acquired by the Salt Lake City Stars from the available player pool. Miles was then later waived on March 10, 2022. On March 12, 20222, Miles was reacquired by the Salt Lake City Stars. On March 20, 2022, Miles was waived. On March 23, 2022, Miles was reacquired via available player pool by the Salt Lake City Stars.
