= Frank Young (basketball) =

American basketball player (born 1984)

Cleveland State Vikings
- Title: Associate Head coach
- League: Horizon League

Personal information
- Born: September 7, 1984 (age 42) Tallahassee, Florida
- Listed height: 6 ft 5 in (1.96 m)
- Listed weight: 210 lb (95 kg)

Career information
- High school: Florida (Tallahassee, Florida)
- College: West Virginia (2003–2007)
- NBA draft: 2007: undrafted
- Playing career: 2007–2011
- Position: Forward
- Coaching career: 2013–present

Career history

Playing
- 2007: EnBW Ludwigsburg
- 2008: Rotterdam Challengers
- 2008–2009: Landstede Basketbal
- 2010–2011: Crailsheim Merlins

Coaching
- 2013–2014: West Virginia Wesleyan (assistant)
- 2014–2017: North Florida (DBO)
- 2017–2019: Presbyterian (assistant)
- 2019–2023: Appalachian State (assistant)
- 2023–2025: Appalachian State (associate HC)
- 2025–: Cleveland State (associate HC)

Career highlights
- First-team All-Big East (2007)

Franklin Louis Young (born September 7, 1984) is an American college basketball coach and retired player, currently an associate head coach at Cleveland State. Young played college basketball for the West Virginia Mountaineers and professionally in several European leagues. Young was commonly referred to as "Frank The Tank" by West Virginia fans.

== Early life ==
Franklin Louis Young was born to Frank B. Young, Jr. and Hattie Mary Young in Tallahassee, Florida. While he excelled as a football quarterback and baseball pitcher in middle school, Young decided to focus exclusively on basketball, where he became a starter on the varsity team at Florida High School as a freshman. As a senior, Young was ranked #164 prospect by Hoop Scoop and was one of the Top 250 prospect by Prep Stars. Bob Gibbons also ranked Young as the 160th best recruit. Young averaged 19 points and 10 rebounds as a junior, but his best season was his senior year. As a senior, he averaged 22.3 points and 10.1 rebounds while being named the Tallahassee Democrat all-Big Bend Player of the Year and 2A Florida State Player of the Year runner-up. Young was also selected to Florida Sports Writers Association's Class 2A all-state squad.

== Collegiate career ==
=== Freshman season ===
Young entered West Virginia University during the 2003 campaign. Young played 21 games as a freshman, but only averaged 1.1 points and 1 rebound. Young's best game was when he scored six points against Maryland on two three-point shots. He also scored five points against Kent State in the NIT Tournament. 21 of Young's 23 points actually came on three-pointers. Young competed in the 2004 European tour, where he averaged 7.0 points and 3.2 rebounds. In the last game of the tour, Young scored 21 points against Germany.

=== Sophomore season ===
In Young's sophomore campaign of 2004, he played in 32 games, starting three of the contests. Young only averaged 3.3 points and 1.3 rebounds though. His season total of points was 105 though, as he played behind a talented roster of young stars. One of Young's best games of the year came against Coppin State, when he scored four points and grabbed four rebounds. Young's best offensive performance of the regular season came against Providence, when he scored 11 points off of 3–4 three-point shots. Young started his first game of the season against Boston College in the Big East tournament, when he scored a then career-best 14 points, 3–5 of those shots from three-point range. He also started against Villanova in the tourney and against Syracuse in the tourney finals. In the NCAA tournament, his best performance came in the first game against Creighton when he scored eight points.

=== Junior season ===
As a junior in 2005, Young was backup to a prestigious class of seniors, including Kevin Pittsnogle and Mike Gansey. But still, Young started 32 of 33 games played, averaging 7.4 points and 3.5 rebounds. He also dished out 66 assists and shot 40.8 percent from the field. Against Washington & Jefferson, Young scored seven points while grabbing six rebounds for his best performance of his season so far. He then matched his career-high of 14 points against Oklahoma a few games later. Against the UCLA squad, Young scored eight points with five rebounds in the upset win. In the Big East tournament championship game, Young grabbed a team-high five rebounds against Pittsburgh. In the NCAA Tourney, Young played fair during the three games. The Mountaineers tourney hopes ended when Texas ended their run on a game-winning three-point shot. In the loss, Young only scored three points.

=== Senior season ===
In Young's final season of 2006–07, Young posted his best performance yet. With the very young and depleted Mountaineer squad, Young averaged 14.7 points per game and 4.3 rebounds. Young set a career-high of points in the fourth game of the season with 21 points against Montana. Then three games later against North Carolina State, Young scored 16 points with 7 rebounds. The very next game against Duquesne, Young scored 18, followed by 16 points at Savannah State. He then set a career-high 22 points against UConn, and then set it again the next game against Villanova with 25 points. Against in-state rival Marshall, Young tied his season and career-high of 25 points. In the upset win over #2 UCLA, Young scored 14 points along with 7 rebounds. To start the Big East tournament, Young posted 12 points against Cincinnati then 21 points and 6 rebounds against Providence. In the loss to Louisville, Young posted 19 points and 6 rebounds. Young was named to the all-Big East team for his regular season performances. Young's best performances of the season came in the NIT Tournament though, when he opened up against Delaware State with 17 points. He followed up that performance with a career-high 31 points against UMass, then 25 points and 5 rebounds against NC State. Young totaled 73 points alone so far in the Tourney, as the Mountaineers moved to their last NIT semifinal appearance since 1981. In the semifinal game against Mississippi State, won by a Darris Nichols' three-point buzzer-beater 63–62, Young scored 16 points, second on the team, and grabbed 6 rebounds. Two days later, when the Mountaineers won the NIT Championship against Clemson 78–73, Young led the team in one of his best performances with 24 points on just 10 shots from the field and 5 rebounds. Young's final game had him leading his team in points, tied for the lead in the game with rebounds, and was 6–7 in three-point shooting. Young totaled 113 points in the five tourney games of his senior year, which were the greatest games his career as he ended his senior season with strong performances, leading his team to the Championship, and Young was named the tournament's MVP with 22.3 points per game.

=== Career ===
Frank Young has been noted as being one of the greatest three-point shooters in Mountaineer history. Young has made 187 out of 499 three-point shots, racking up 117 three-point shots made alone in his senior season, out of 270 three-points attempted. Young broke the team-record for most three-points in a season in the NC State game in the NIT Tournament of Young's 06–07 season, breaking Chris Leonard's record of 101 treys with his 107 treys after the NC State game. Young is also noted for his rebounding skills, grabbing 337 career rebounds.

Young finished with the 10th best career 3-point shooting percentage (37.5%) and the 9th most games played (122) in school history.

== Professional career ==
=== 2007 ===
Frank Young signed with the EnBW Ludwigsburg Team in Ludwigsburg, Germany. EnBW Ludwigsburg plays in the Basketball Bundesliga, Germany's highest level of club basketball where play determines the National Champion. Stats 10 games: 7.4ppg, 2.1rpg, 2FGP: 57.1%, 3PT: 28.0%, FT: 50.0%; ULEB Cup: 4 games: 9.5ppg, 1.3rpg, In December 2007 he left the team.

=== 2008 ===
In January 2008, he moved to the Rotterdam Challengers (NED-Eredivisie), a team in Rotterdam, The Netherlands and he played there until the end of the season. Stats: 21 games: 9.6ppg, 3.1rpg, 1.3apg, 1.3spg, FGP: 38.3%, 3PT: 36.1%, FT: 40.0%

On November 4, 2008, Frank Young signed for Landstede Basketbal a team in Zwolle, The Netherlands

=== 2010 ===
For the 2010–2011 season, Young signed for the Crailsheim Merlins in the German Pro A League.

== Coaching career ==
Following the end of his playing career, Young entered the college coaching ranks. After stints on the West Virginia Wesleyan and North Florida staffs, Young accepted an assistant coach role at Presbyterian in June, 2017.

=== Appalachian State ===
On April 18, 2019, he was named assistant coach at Appalachian State by the new head coach Dustin Kerns, who Young served under while at Presbyterian. He was promoted to associate head coach for his last two seasons at Appalachian.

=== Cleveland State ===
On April 16, 2025, Young was named associate head coach at Cleveland State.
