= Lost Lettermen =

Sports weblog and database

Lost Lettermen was a sports weblog and database, which was launched by Jim Weber in March 2009. It was dedicated to former college football and basketball players. It regularly interviewed former college stars such as Tee Martin, Charlie Ward, Ki-Jana Carter, Ed O'Bannon, Corliss Williamson and Mateen Cleaves. It also had a database of over 150,000 former college athletes to answer the question, "Where Are They Now?"

The site was featured in USA Today in March 2010 to locate the current whereabouts of NCAA Tournament one-hit wonders such as Bryce Drew and Kevin Pittsnogle. Jim Weber sold the site in 2015, and as of August 2017 it no longer was in operation.
