= 2018 NBA G League draft =

General information
- Sport: Basketball
- Date: October 20, 2018

Overview
- League: NBA
- First selection: Willie Reed, Salt Lake City Stars

The 2018 NBA G League draft was the 18th draft of the National Basketball Association G League. The draft was held on October 20, 2018, just before the 2018–19 season. Former G League All-Star Willie Reed was selected with the first overall pick by the Salt Lake City Stars.

== Key ==
Pos.	G	F	C
Position	Guard	Forward	Center

^	Denotes player who has been selected to (an) NBA G League International Challenge Teams(s)
*	Denotes player who has been selected to (an) NBA G League International Challenge Team(s) and was also selected in an NBA draft
†	Denotes player who was also selected in an NBA Draft

== Draft ==
=== First round ===
Pick	Player	Pos.	Nationality	Team	College/Country
1	Willie Reed^	C	United States	Salt Lake City Stars	Saint Louis
2	Chinanu Onuaku^{†}	C	United States	Greensboro Swarm	Louisville
3	Tyler Nelson	G	United States	Greensboro Swarm (via Delaware)	Fairfield
4	Alen Smailagić^{†}	PF	Serbia	South Bay Lakers (via Maine)	Serbia
5	Terrell Miller	F	United States	Erie BayHawks (via Wisconsin)	Murray State
6	Aaron Epps	F	United States	Northern Arizona Suns (via Memphis)	LSU
7	Darel Poirier	C	France	Canton Charge	France
8	Terry Maston	F	United States	Stockton Kings (via Agua Caliente)	Baylor
9	Hakim Warrick^{†}	F/C	United States	Delaware Blue Coats (via Northern Arizona)	Syracuse
10	Jordan Howard	G	United States	Santa Cruz Warriors	Central Arkansas
11	Daxter Miles Jr.	G	United States	Iowa Wolves	West Virginia
12	Joe Kilgore	G	United States	Windy City Bulls	Texas A&M–Corpus Christi
13	Jovan Mooring	G	United States	Grand Rapids Drive (via Sioux Falls)	UNLV
14	Durand Scott	G	Jamaica	Long Island Nets	Miami (FL)
15	Noah Allen	G	United States	Capital City Go-Go	Hawaii
16	Roddy Peters	G	United States	Northern Arizona Suns (via Lakeland)	Nicholls State
17	Kentrell Barkley	G	United States	Santa Cruz Warriors (via South Bay)	East Carolina
18	Jemerrio Jones	F	United States	Santa Cruz Warriors (via Erie)	New Mexico State
19	Micah Seaborn	G	United States	Grand Rapids Drive (via Oklahoma City)	Monmouth
20	Manu Lecomte	G	Belgium	Agua Caliente Clippers (via Texas)	Baylor
21	Sanjay Lumpkin	G	United States	Erie BayHawks (via Grand Rapids)	Northwestern
22	Jabari Craig	F	Canada	Long Island Nets (via Rio Grande Valley)	East Carolina
23	Marcus Marshall	G	United States	Delaware Blue Coats (via Stockton)	Nevada
24	QJ Peterson	G	United States	Lakeland Magic (via Fort Wayne and Agua Caliente)	VMI
25	Leron Black	F	United States	Raptors 905	Illinois
26	Connor Burchfield	G	United States	Austin Spurs	William & Mary
27	Chris Wray	F	United States	Westchester Knicks	Mount St. Mary's

=== Other notable draftees ===
Rnd.	Pick	Player	Pos.	Nationality	Team	College/Country
2	30	Rob Gray	G	United States	Fort Wayne Mad Ants (via Delaware)	Houston
2	37	ShawnDre' Jones	G	United States	Canton Charge	Richmond
2	48	Jaleel Cousins	C	United States	Rio Grande Valley Vipers	South Florida
2	49	LaQuinton Ross	F/G	United States	Northern Arizona Suns (via Fort Wayne)	Ohio State
2	52	Parker Jackson-Cartwright	G	United States	Raptors 905	Arizona
4	69	Michael Qualls	G	United States	Wisconsin Herd	Arkansas
4	74	DeJuan Blair^{†}	F/C	United States	Austin Spurs	Pittsburgh
