= Chris Paul Camps =

Youth basketball camp organization

CP3 Youth Camps is a youth basketball camp organization based in Winston-Salem, North Carolina, United States. The organization was started by San Antonio Spurs point guard Chris Paul.

== Mission ==
The mission of CP3 Camps is to provide a fun, safe, and enriching environment where campers can develop as a positive all around athlete on and off the court. Chris and his staff dedicate instructional drills, in dribbling, shooting, rebounding, team offense, and defensive skills to help the campers gain skill and confidence.

== Youth Camps and Programs ==
=== Youth Clinic ===
Chris Paul runs a one-day clinic for youth ages 6 to 16 where attendees develop fundamentals and advance technique while participating in games, contest, and fun activities. All campers receive a T-shirt.

=== Youth Camp ===
Campers have the opportunity to develop their skills through the instruction of college and professional coaches and also through Chris himself. The youth camp is a through day event where campers will develop fundamentals and work on technique advancement. This camp is open to youth ages 8 to 16 and all campers receive a T-shirt and a photo with Chris Paul.

=== Overnight Camp ===
The CP3 overnight camp is offered to young athletes ages 10 to 17. This is a four-day event located in San Diego, California. All events are held at the University of California-San Diego in RIMAC Arena. Campers spend the days working on skill development and technique enhancement and stay in the University dorms overnight. The camp provides meals, supervision, a CP3 wristband, a team photo, a personal photo with Chris Paul, medical care, and a certificate of participation. The cost of the overnight camp is $1,050.

== Elite Guard Camp ==
The Elite Guard Camp is an invitation only camp to the top high school and college point guards from around the United States. The camp is held in Winston-Salem, North Carolina and is a three-day event. Campers receive Jordan Brand gear while competing amongst top rated point guards from around the country, and receiving instruction from top college and professional coaches. Some past participants have been Harrison Barnes now of the Sacramento Kings, Ja Morant of the Memphis Grizzlies, and Jamal Murray of the Denver Nuggets.
