= Johannes Herber =

German basketball player (born 1983)

Personal information
- Born: January 17, 1983 (age 43) Darmstadt, West Germany
- Listed height: 6 ft 5.75 in (1.97 m)
- Listed weight: 210 lb (95 kg)

Career information
- College: West Virginia (2002–2006)
- NBA draft: 2006: undrafted
- Playing career: 1999–2012
- Position: Shooting guard

Career history
- 1999–2002: TV Langen
- 2006–2010: Alba Berlin
- 2010–2011: Walter Tigers Tübingen
- 2011–2012: Skyliners Frankfurt

Career highlights
- Academic All-America Team Member of the Year (2006)

Johannes Herber (born January 17, 1983) is a former German basketball player. He was born in Darmstadt. In 2006, he completed a U.S. college career at West Virginia University (WVU). In America, he was generally known as Joe Herber.

== College career ==
After being developed by the Langen club in Germany, Herber received several professional offers in Europe, but turned them down in favor of a U.S. college career. The 6'6", 200 lb (1.98 m, 91 kg) all-around guard became the second recruit of new West Virginia coach John Beilein in 2002. Herber went on to start every game of his four-year WVU career, setting school records for most games started and minutes played. He also finished his college career as WVU's fifth-leading assist man. Herber, along with Kevin Pittsnogle and Mike Gansey, was a key player on the Mountaineers' NCAA regional finalists team in 2005 and highly ranked 2006 team. Herber also had an outstanding academic record at WVU, graduating with a 4.0 GPA in political science and gaining entry to the Order of Augusta, WVU's highest undergraduate honor. He was named by the College Sports Information Directors of America (CoSIDA) as an Academic All-American three times and Academic All-America Team Member of the Year.

== German national team ==
During his time at WVU, Herber spent his summers with the German junior national team, competing in the 2005 World University Games. He was also a member of the German senior national squad for the 2006 World Championship. Herber played in seven games as Germany advanced to the quarter-finals before losing to Team USA. He averaged 4.3 points per game in the tournament.
