= Terrell Miller (basketball) =

American basketball player (born 1995)

Personal information
- Born: April 3, 1995 (age 31) Jacksonville, Florida, US
- Listed height: 6 ft 8 in (2.03 m)
- Listed weight: 245 lb (111 kg)

Career information
- High school: Arlington Country Day (Jacksonville, Florida)
- College: Southwest Mississippi CC (2014–2016); Murray State (2016–2018)
- NBA draft: 2018: undrafted
- Playing career: 2019–2019
- Position: Power forward

Career history
- 2019: Hiroshima Dragonflies

Career highlights
- 2× First-team All-OVC (2017, 2018); NJCAA Honorable Mention All-American (2016)

Terrell Miller Jr. (born April 3, 1995) is an American professional basketball player who last played for the Hiroshima Dragonflies of the Japanese B.League. He played college basketball for Southwest Mississippi Community College and Murray State University.

== Early life and college career ==
Miller attended Arlington Country Day School in Jacksonville, Florida. He played college basketball for Southwest Mississippi Community College's Bears and Murray State University's Racers.

In his freshman season at Southwest Mississippi Community College, Miller helped the Bears to win the MACJC Tournament title for the first time in 53 years. In his sophomore season, Miller led his team in scoring and rebounding with 15.7 points and 9.5 rebounds per game. On April 7, 2016, Miller was named NJCAA Honorable Mention All-American.

On April 22, 2016, Miller was transferred from Southwest Mississippi to Murray State.

In his senior year at Murray State, Miller averaged 15 points, 8.5 rebounds and 1.5 assists in 30.6 minutes per game, shooting 40.2 percent from 3-point range. On February 27, 2018, Miller earned a spot in the All-OVC First Team, alongside his teammates Ja Morant and Jonathan Stark.

== Professional career ==
On August 8, 2018, Miller signed a one-year deal with the Israeli team Hapoel Eilat. However, on August 30, 2018, Miller parted ways with Eilat due to family reasons before appearing in a game for them. On October 20, 2018, Miller was selected with the fifth overall pick in the 2018 NBA G League draft by the Erie BayHawks. However, on November 1, 2018, The BayHawks placed the contract of Miller on waivers.

On January 17, 2019, Miller signed with the Hiroshima Dragonflies of the Japanese B.League. In 15 games played for the Dragonflies, he averaged 16.6 points, 9.2 rebounds and 4.1 assists per game.
