= West Virginia Mountaineers men's basketball =

University basketball team

2026–27 West Virginia Mountaineers men's basketball team
- University: West Virginia University
- First season: 1903–04; 123 years ago
- Athletic director: Wren Baker
- Head coach: Ross Hodge; 2nd season, 21–14 (.600)
- Location: Morgantown, West Virginia
- Arena: Hope Coliseum (capacity: 14,000)
- NCAA division: Division I
- Conference: Big 12
- Nickname: Mountaineers
- Colors: Gold and blue
- Student section: Mountaineer Maniacs
- All-time record: 1,892–1,202 (.612)
- NCAA tournament record: 32–31 (.508)

NCAA Division I tournament runner-up
- 1959
Other NCAA Division I tournament results
Final Four	1959, 2010
Elite Eight	1959, 2005, 2010
Sweet Sixteen	1959, 1960, 1963, 1998, 2005, 2006, 2008, 2010, 2015, 2017, 2018
Appearances	1955, 1956, 1957, 1958, 1959, 1960, 1962, 1963, 1965, 1967, 1982, 1983, 1984, 1986, 1987, 1989, 1992, 1998, 2005, 2006, 2008, 2009, 2010, 2011, 2012, 2015, 2016, 2017, 2018, 2021, 2023

NIT champions
- 1942, 2007

Conference tournament champions
- SoCon: 1955, 1956, 1957, 1958, 1959, 1960, 1962, 1963, 1965, 1967 A-10: 1983, 1984 Big East: 2010

Conference regular-season champions
- EIC: 1935 SoCon: 1952, 1955, 1956, 1957, 1958, 1959, 1961, 1962, 1963, 1967 A-10: 1982, 1985, 1989

Conference division champions
- A-10 West: 1983

College Basketball Crown champion
- 2026

Uniforms
Home	Away	Alternate

The West Virginia Mountaineers men's basketball team represents West Virginia University in NCAA Division I college basketball competition. They are a member of the Big 12 Conference. WVU has won 13 conference tournament championships, and has 31 appearances in the NCAA tournament, including two Final Fours, most recently in 2010. The Mountaineers have also appeared in 16 National Invitation Tournaments (NIT), and have won the tournament twice, in 1942 and 2007. The 1942 NIT Championship is claimed by West Virginia as a National Championship.

WVU plays their home games at the Hope Coliseum, their home venue since 1970.

== History ==
West Virginia men's basketball has competed in three basketball championship final matches: the 1959 NCAA tournament final, the 1942 NIT final (at that time, the NIT was considered more prestigious than the NCAA), and the 2007 NIT championship. They lost 71–70 to California in the 1959 NCAA finals, while the Mountaineers won the 1942 NIT championship 47–45 over Western Kentucky, and the 2007 National Invitation Tournament contest over Clemson 78–72 in a rebuilding season. In 1949, future Mountaineers head coach Fred Schaus became the first player in NCAA history to record 1,000 points.

The most points scored in a game was 132 points against Alaska-Fairbanks in 1994, while the largest margin of victory was against Salem College, with the Mountaineers winning 113–32 in 1945. The largest margin of defeat in Mountaineer basketball history came in 1978 against Louisville, when the Cardinals beat the Mountaineers 106–60.

=== 1955–1965 era ===
==== Rod Hundley ====
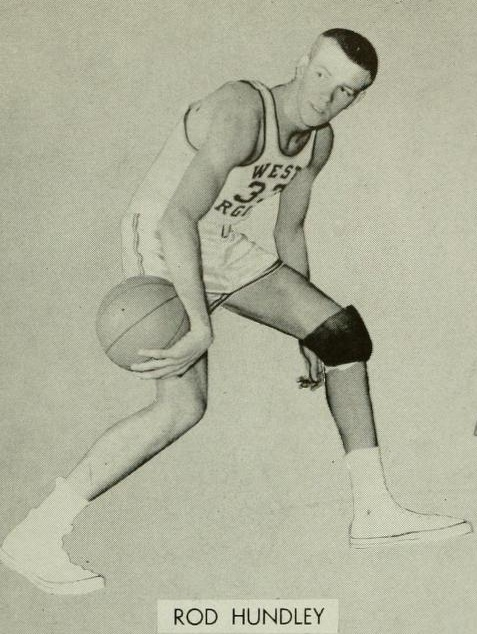
Hot Rod Hundley in 1955

The modern era of West Virginia basketball history began in 1955, with the emergence of sophomore guard Hot Rod Hundley and newly appointed head coach Fred Schaus. The Mountaineers finished with a 19–11 record, and earned the first NCAA tournament appearance in school history under Hundley's lead. The team entered the tournament with a #19 ranking, the first Top 20 ranking in school history. However, they lost to the #3 La Salle Explorers in the first round of the tourney, 95–61.

The following season, 1956, the Mountaineers posted a 21–9 record in Hundley's junior season, which was his best statistically. The team began the season with a #14 ranking, however lost consecutively to #13 George Washington University and #2 North Carolina State, dropping them out of the rankings. They eventually worked their way back to a #19 ranking, before losing to Villanova, La Salle, and Carnegie Tech to drop out of the rankings again. The squad never entered the rankings again on the season until the NCAA tournament, when they reached the #14 ranking. However, they once again lost in the first round to Dartmouth College, 61–59 in overtime.

In Hundley's senior season, 1957, the team opened with eight straight victories, including an 83–82 upset over the Duke Blue Devils. The team also reached the #13 ranking before the Duke victory, and then rose to the #8 ranking in the final two victories. It marked the first time a Mountaineer squad was ranked in the Top 10 nationally. Going into the Dixie Classic, the Mountaineers achieved a #4 ranking (the first Top 5 ranking in school history), but lost three straight games in the tourney. The team posted 11 consecutive wins afterwards, rising from a #19 ranking to a #10 ranking. They dropped to #14 after a loss to Penn State, but won the next six games, including the Southern Conference Championship. The #7 Mountaineers were dropped in the first round of the NCAA tournament again however, to the #20 Canisius team, 64–56.

==== Jerry West ====
After Hot Rod Hundley's graduation and departure to the NBA, sophomore guard Jerry West emerged for the Mountaineers and Fred Schaus. In his rookie collegiate season, West helped the Mountaineers to a 26–2 record, with a 12–0 conference record. The Mountaineers began the season with a #8 ranking, as they earned defeats over Penn State, #19 Richmond, and a 77–70 victory over #5 Kentucky in the Kentucky Invitational Tournament. The following game, the Mountaineers upset the #1-ranked nationally North Carolina, 75–65, to win the Kentucky Tourney. After the UNC victory, the Mountaineers rose to the first-ever #1 ranking in school history. In the two wins in the tourney, West totaled 29 points and 19 rebounds. Over the next six-game winning streak, the Mountaineers produced wins over Canisius, Villanova, Pittsburgh, and Furman. However, the Mountaineers were finally toppled by the Duke Blue Devils in Durham, 72–68. The squad retained their #1 ranking however, as they produced victories over Florida State, St. John's, VMI, Penn State, and Pittsburgh. In the final regular-season game, against George Washington, the team went into double overtime to pull out a 113–107 victory, with West earning 25 points and 9 rebounds. The squad swept the Southern Conference tournament, with their closest victory an 11-point win over Richmond in the semi-finals. However, the one-loss squad lost in the first round of the NCAA tournament for the fourth consecutive season, this loss coming to Manhattan, 84–89.

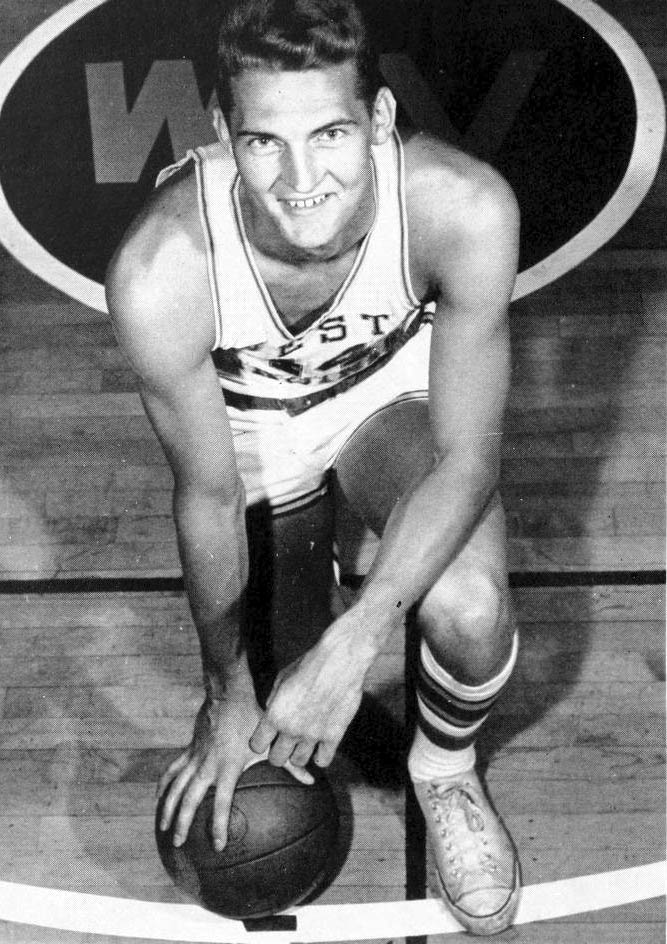
Jerry West in 1959

The following season, West's junior season at West Virginia, the squad posted a 29–5 record with another undefeated conference record, 11–0. The squad's highest ranking of the season was at a #4 ranking after a Penn State victory in the third game of the season. However, they lost shortly afterwards to Virginia to drop to #7. The Mountaineers posted two more wins, but lost in the Kentucky Invitational Tournament to #2 Kentucky, 91–97. They rose to #5 after the loss, but then lost the following game to #12 Northwestern in double overtime, 109–118. The Mountaineers bounced back however, with a victory over the #11-ranked Tennessee Volunteers. The team dropped to #11 in the rankings, but posted ten straight victories afterwards. The streak included an overtime victory over Penn State and a Backyard Brawl victory over Pittsburgh as the Mountaineers were ranked #10. As soon as the team rose to #9, they lost in overtime to NYU, but posted two straight wins following. The team ended the season with wins over Pittsburgh and George Washington. They swept the Southern Conference tournament for a third straight season. For the first time in Fred Schaus' coaching career at WVU, the Mountaineers advanced further than the opening round of the NCAA tournament. The team eventually won the East Region with victories over #14 St. Joseph's in the semi-finals and Boston University in the finals. In the two games, West scored 69 points in leading the Mountaineers into the Final Four, the furthest ventured in school history. The Mountaineers won their semifinal matchup against the Louisville Cardinals, 94–79; with West scoring 38 points and grabbing 15 rebounds. However, in the championship game, the Mountaineers were bested by California, 70–71. Jerry West was named the tournament MVP, having scored 28 points and gathering 11 rebounds in the championship loss.

In the 1960 season following their NCAA tournament championship loss, West led the Mountaineers to a 26–5 record as a senior. The team posted eight straight wins before being ranked, including victories over Tennessee, Richmond, and Kentucky to win the Kentucky Invitational Tournament. Upon being ranked #2 in the nation, the Mountaineers won over the Stanford Cardinal and UCLA Bruins in the Los Angeles Classic, before losing to #3 California in the Championship game. The squad dropped to #3, but posted six straight victories afterwards. The victories included Penn State, Virginia, and Pittsburgh. They lost to William & Mary, but continued with three more victories before their loss to St. John's as they were ranked #5. They finished the season with a victory over Pittsburgh in the Backyard Brawl, before sweeping the Southern Conference tournament for the fourth straight season, ranking #7 in the nation during the tourney. The squad made it to the semi-finals of the East Region of the 1960 NCAA tournament, but lost to #12 New York University, 81–82. They did finish out their tourney resume with a 106–100 victory over St. Joseph's in the Regional Third Place matchup

==== Rod Thorn ====
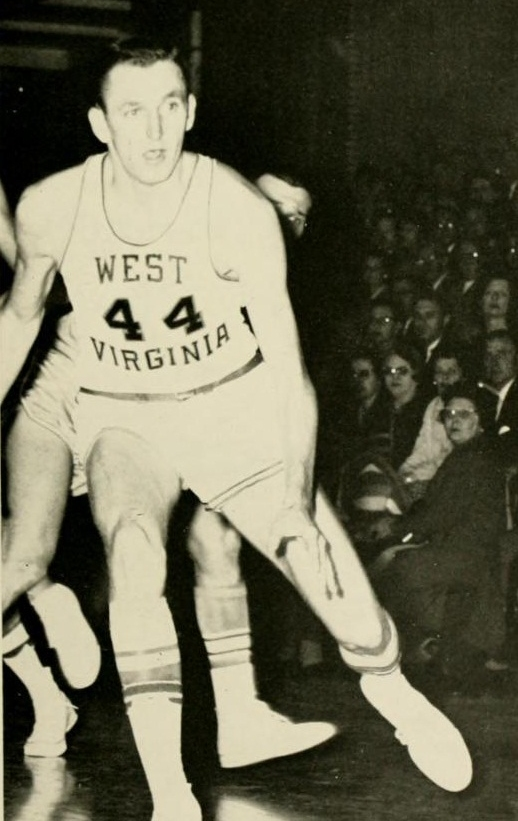
Rod Thorn in 1963

After the departure of Jerry West to the NBA draft, sophomore guard Rod Thorn stepped in to fill his place for new head coach George King, much like West did when star guard Hot Rod Hundley graduated for former head coach Fred Schaus in 1958. Thorn helped the Mountaineers to a 23–4 record, 11–1 in conference. Their highest ranking of the season came in the Southern Conference tournament, where they finished it out with a #8 ranking as they lost the Championship for the first time in four years. The Mountaineers season resume included wins over Wake Forest, #19 Memphis State to win the Sugar Bowl, Syracuse, Pittsburgh, Virginia Tech, NC State, and four more victories to end the season over Penn State, Pitt, Penn State again, and George Washington, respectively. The Mountaineers lost in the second round of the Southern Conference tournament to William & Mary, 76–88, which kept them out of the NCAA tournament.

The following season, Rod Thorn guided the Mountaineers to a 24–6 record, 11–1 in conference. The Mountaineers won the first six games of the season, but lost the seventh game of the season against #7 Duke, 65–69. They lost the following two games as they earned a #7 ranking, but finished out the three-game Los Angeles Classic with a victory over Army. They once again posted a seven-game win streak after the Classic, including a key win over #5 Villanova. But the squad lost to Virginia Tech, 82–85, before starting another win streak: of four games. The team lost to New York University, but won three games to finish the season. The squad swept the Southern Conference tournament with a Championship win over Virginia Tech, but lost in the first round of the NCAA tournament to the same Villanova team they had defeated earlier in the season.

In Thorn's final season as a Mountaineer, effectively ending the era of WVU basketball, the team posted a 23–8 record with an 11–2 conference record. The team began the season ranked #5, but would end the season with unranked with a loss in the NCAA tournament semi-finals and a victory in the Regional Third Place matchup over #9 New York University. The #3 Mountaineers began the season with a loss to Ohio State in the third game of the season, 69–76. They followed three games later with a loss to #9 Kentucky, as they were ranked #7. The team went unranked before they posted two wins over Boston College in overtime and St. Bonaventure, before losing to #4 Illinois. The team went on a six-game run, where they reached a #9 ranking, but lost as the #6 team nationally to the #4 Duke Blue Devils, 71–111, and then the following loss to Furman. The squad posted three more wins, but then lost again to William & Mary and Pittsburgh. The team won five straight games to finish the season, including sweeping the Southern Conference tournament for the consecutive season. The squad opened up the NCAA tournament with a victory over Connecticut, but then lost in the east region semi-finals to St. Joseph's.

=== 2001–2005 senior class ===
Other than the late 1950s teams of Jerry West, Rod Hundley, Rod Thorn, and such other greats, the senior squad of 2001–2005 was one of the greatest teams of the school's history, mainly in the 2005–06 campaign. The starting lineup consisted of Johannes Herber and Frank Young (junior) at forward, while J.D. Collins and Mike Gansey played guards. Kevin Pittsnogle started at center, though he led the team with three-point shots. Senior Patrick Beilein (former coach John Beilein's son) got considerable playing time as well. The senior class was led by team MVPs Gansey and Pittsnogle, who were both named to the All-Big East team. The team advanced to the Sweet 16 of the NCAA tournament before losing to Texas 74–71 due to a game-winning three-point shot at the buzzer. This loss marked the end of an era. It consisted of back-to-back Sweet 16 appearances, the first since the 1959 and 1960 teams of Jerry West, and an overall record of 77–51.

=== 2007 NIT Championship ===
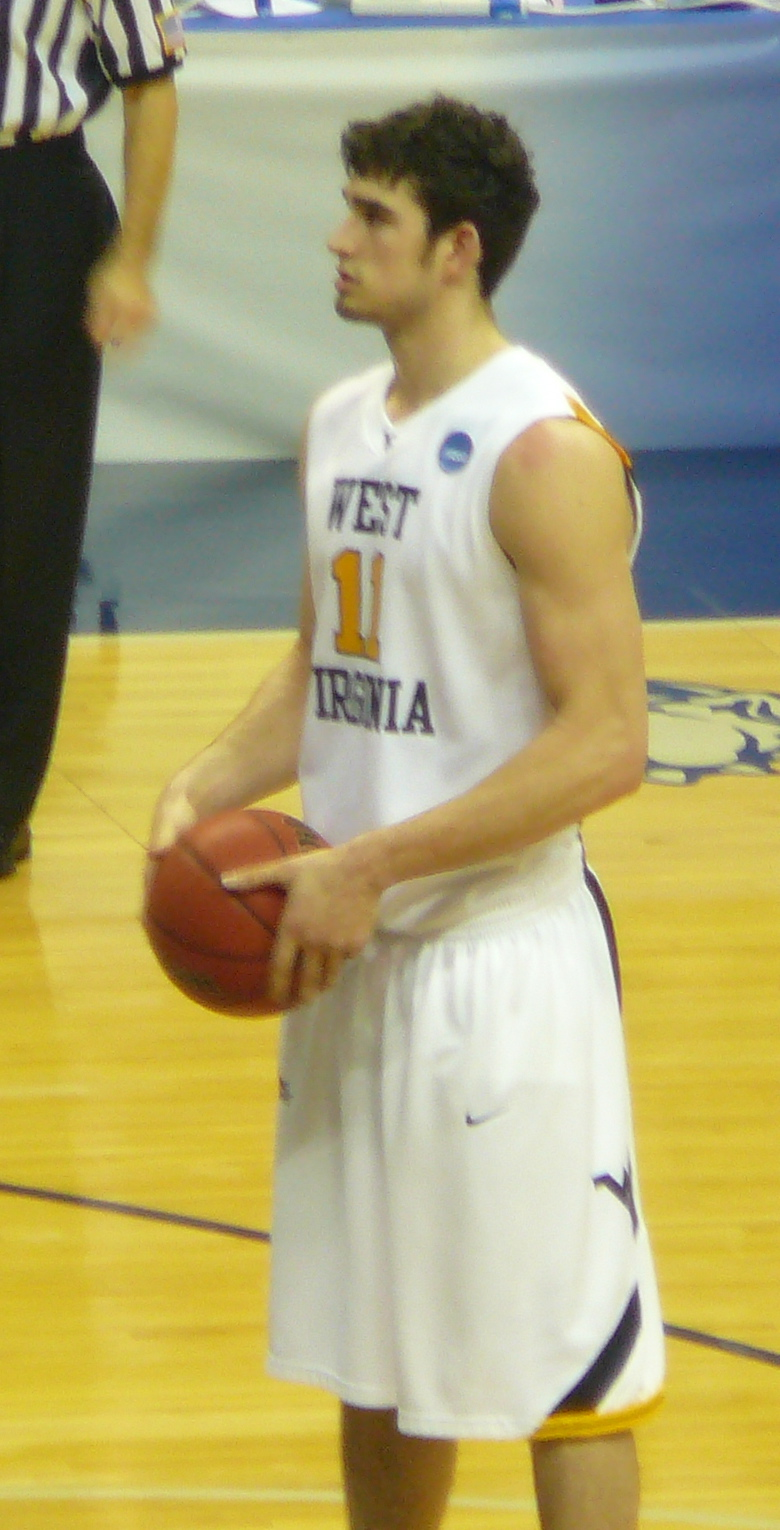
Joe Alexander

The team that followed the 2001–2005 senior class was projected to be weak and undeveloped due to lack of experience. Frank Young was the only senior that got considerable playing time from the previous year, although center Rob Summers was a senior as well. Young started at forward, along with Da'Sean Butler, Wellington Smith, and Joe Alexander who all shared time. The guard position consisted of starter Darris Nichols and Alex Ruoff, although Ted Talkington got small action in a few games. Rob Summers started at center all year but shared time with back up center Jamie Smalligan. The primary starting line up was Nichols, Ruoff, Young, Alexander, and Summers, although all other players shared fairly equal time off the bench, including forward Da'Sean Butler.

The team, projected to have a bad year with a tough Big East schedule, started out their season 5–0 with an easy early schedule. After a loss to Arkansas, they posted an 8–0 record to make their season record 13–1 before suffering two losses to Notre Dame and Marquette to make their record 13–3. After a win against USF and an overtime loss at Cincinnati, the Mountaineers won four games to make their record 18–4. They were beaten by 13 at home to nationally ranked Pittsburgh, followed by one of the biggest upsets in school history. The upset of #2 UCLA 70–65 made the Mountaineers 19–5, although they lost to Georgetown the next week to make their record 19–6. After a win against Seton Hall, they lost back-to-back against Providence and Pittsburgh both on the road. They then finished out the regular season with a home blowout of Cincinnati to make their record 21–8.

The Mountaineers then beat Providence in the first round of the Big East tournament. In the second round, the Mountaineers held with the Louisville Cardinals for two-overtimes, but lost 82–71. The Mountaineers failed to be selected for the NCAA tournament, to the surprise of many West Virginia fans, but they managed to accept a #1 seed in the NIT. The Mountaineers then posted an easy win against Delaware State. The second round the Mountaineers won a shootout 90–77 against UMass, then a nail biting win against North Carolina State at home to win the east region, making the first NIT semifinal appearance since 1981. The semifinal contest against Mississippi State was one of the great wins in Mountaineer history, in which Darris Nichols hit the game-winning three-point shot to win the game 63–62 for the Mountaineers. Two days later in the National Invitation Tournament, the Mountaineers, led by Frank Young's 24 points and Da'Sean Butler's 20 points off the bench, beat Clemson 78–72 to win the university's second NIT crown after their 1942 victory.

=== Bob Huggins era ===
==== 2007–2023 ====
A few days after WVU won the 2007 National Invitation Tournament, coach John Beilein announced he would be leaving the school to accept a head coaching job with Michigan. His official departure on April 4, 2007, was followed a day later by the announcement that Morgantown native Bob Huggins was resigning his post at Kansas State to take the vacant head coaching job at WVU. Huggins was followed by assistant coach Billy Hahn.

The Mountaineers earned an 88–65 win over Mountain State in an exhibition game to start the season. West Virginia then entered a match-up against #7 Tennessee with a 2–0 record. However, the Mountaineers lost 74–72. The Mountaineers then posted an eight-game win streak on the way to a 10–1 record. The streak consisted of wins over Auburn, Winthrop, and New Mexico State. West Virginia then lost to Oklahoma 88–82 and then Notre Dame 69–56. They defeated #11 Marquette, 79–64, but followed up with a loss to Louisville 63–54. They then posted four-straight wins over Syracuse, St. John's, South Florida, and Marshall. The Mountaineers then lost to #9 Georgetown 58–57, after a questionable block (or goaltending) call to end the game. However, West Virginia could not rebound in the next game, and lost to Huggins' former job, at Cincinnati, to a final score of 62–39. They rebounded with a 77–65 victory at Providence, but then lost at #25 Pittsburgh in the Backyard Brawl on a buzzer-beating three-point shot by Pitt's Ronald Ramon to win the game, 55–54.

With their record at 16–7, the Mountaineers followed up with an 81–63 victory over Rutgers, then an 89–68 victory over Seton Hall. The Mountaineers were then upset by Villanova, 56–78, but bounced back with an 80–53 victory over Providence. The Mountaineers earned their 20th win of the season in an 85–73 victory over DePaul. With their record at 20–8, the Mountaineers extended its 20-win season streak to four seasons, the best ever since a seven-season streak from 1981 to 1987. Bob Huggins' 20-win season moved his record to at least 20 wins in 22 of his 26 seasons coaching. His twenty 20-win seasons in his collegiate career at the Division 1 level is tied for 12th place all-time. "I'm old," Huggins said of the accomplishment.

After the DePaul victory, the Mountaineers lost a critical game to #16 Connecticut, 79–71. However, Joe Alexander scored a then career-high 32 points and added another 10 rebounds. In the following game, the Backyard Brawl and Senior Night, the Mountaineers won their home game finale over their archrival, the Pittsburgh Panthers, 76–62, to improve to 10–7 in the conference and move to 6th place. Joe Alexander again had a career day by posting a consecutive 32-point performance, also adding 6 rebounds.

The Mountaineers finished the year with an 83–74 overtime victory over St. John's, then opened the Big East tournament with a 58–53 victory over Providence. In the second round of the tourney, the Mountaineers upset the #15-ranked Connecticut Huskies, 78–72. Joe Alexander contributed with a career-high 34 points and 7 rebounds. The Mountaineers then, however, lost to the #9 Georgetown Hoyas, 55–72, in the tourney semifinals.

The run to the Big East semifinals paved the way for the team to reach the 2008 NCAA Division I men's basketball tournament in coach Huggins' first season. The Mountaineers received a #7 seed in the west region, set to play the #10 seed Arizona Wildcats, on March 20. The Mountaineers were victorious over Arizona in their first game of the NCAA tournament with a final score of 75–65. This advanced the Mountaineers into the second round of the tournament to play the Duke Blue Devils for the third time in school history. The team then beat #2 seed Duke, 73–67. They lost the Sweet Sixteen match to #3 seed Xavier in overtime, 79–75. West Virginia finished the season ranked #17.

==== 2008–2009 ====
West Virginia began the 2008 season projected to finish 9th in the Big East under Huggins. However, they began the season 4–0, led by senior Alex Ruoff, junior Da'Sean Butler, and a freshman class highlighted by Devin Ebanks, Kevin Jones and Darryl Bryant. They lost the Las Vegas Invitational Tournament Championship Game to Kentucky 54–43, but then bounced back with two wins to move to 6–1. However, they lost a last-second game to #22 Davidson and Stephen Curry in Madison Square Garden, 68–65.

Following the loss, WVU posted five straight victories; ending at the beginning of 2009. This streak included a 76–48 win over #13 Ohio State in Columbus, snapping the Buckeyes' nation-long 14-game win streak and handing OSU their biggest home loss since 1998. However, the streak ended in a 61–55 loss to #5 Connecticut which was followed by a 75–53 loss to #15 Marquette. The Mountaineers bounced back with a three-game win streak that included a 75–58 victory over #14 Georgetown in Washington, D.C. However, the streak ended in the 79–67 loss to #4 Pittsburgh in the Backyard Brawl. WVU defeated St. John's, but then lost to #7 Louisville and #20 Syracuse back-to-back. The Mountaineers ended the losing streak with an 86–59 win over Providence, but then lost to #4 Pittsburgh for the second time.

West Virginia followed the loss to Pittsburgh with a 93–72 victory over #13 Villanova, featuring Da'Sean Butler's career-high 43 point performance. The Mountaineers then defeated Notre Dame and Rutgers before losing to Cincinnati 70–59 in Huggins's return to Cincinnati. The Mountaineers bounced back with consecutive wins against USF and DePaul, but lost to #6 Louisville 62–59 in Morgantown while hosting College GameDay.

West Virginia earned a first round bye in the Big East tournament, and opened the second round of play with a 74–62 victory over Notre Dame. In the quarterfinals round, West Virginia defeated rival #2 Pittsburgh 74–60 in a shocking upset. The Mountaineers next played the #20 Syracuse Orange in the semi-finals, losing 74–69 in overtime. WVU's second consecutive trip to the Big East semi-finals paved the way for a #6 seed in the NCAA tournament, where they would play the #11 seed Dayton Flyers. However, the Mountaineers would be upset by Dayton to the score of 68–60, ending the season.

==== 2009–2010 ====
The 2009–10 West Virginia Mountaineers team captured the first Big East tournament championship in school history and won the east region to advance to the second Final Four in school history, where they lost in the national semi-finals (Final Four) to eventual national champion Duke, 78–57 after Da'Sean Butler tore his ACL with 8:59 left in the 2nd half. The team finished #3 in the final Coaches Poll with a record of 31–7, setting the record for most wins in school history. Da'Sean Butler scored nine game-winning baskets over the course of the season, including one in each game of the Big East tournament. Butler and Devin Ebanks were both selected in the second round of the NBA draft.

==== 2010–2011 ====
The West Virginia Mountaineers finished the regular season with a record of 20–11 overall and 11–7 in the Big East, good for sixth place in the conference. They earned a 5th seed in east region of the 2011 NCAA tournament, one of the record eleven Big East Conference teams selected. They defeated the Clemson Tigers in the second round, 84–76, to advance to the Round of 32. In a rematch of last season's Elite Eight match-up, the Mountaineers played the Kentucky Wildcats. Despite holding a 41–33 halftime lead, the Mountaineers lost, 71–63. WVU finished their season with a record of 21–12.

=== Notable games ===
- March 2, 1949, against Geneva in Morgantown, West Virginia, with a 75–38 win when Fred Schaus scored 1000th career point.
- February 26, 1951, at Pittsburgh in Pittsburgh, Pennsylvania, with a 72–74 loss when the final basketball game played in Pitt Pavilion was held.
- February 9, 1957, at Richmond in Richmond, Virginia, with an 87–81 win when Rod Hundley scored 2000th career point.
- March 22, 1959 California defeats West Virginia 71 to 70 for NCAA national title. Jerry West nearly wins the game with a last second shot from half court.
- February 11, 1960, at St. John's in New York City with a 73–79 loss when Jerry West scored 2000th career point.
- February 7, 1966, West Virginia defeats #2 Duke 94–90 in coach Bucky Waters' most memorable win.
- January 14, 1970, at Pittsburgh in Pittsburgh, Pennsylvania, with a 67–66 overtime win when a Pittsburgh fan threw a large dead fish onto the court after a technical foul against Pittsburgh.
- March 3, 1970, against Pittsburgh in Morgantown, West Virginia, with an 87–92 loss in the final game in Mountaineer Fieldhouse.
- February 19, 1977, West Virginia's 81–68 upset of the #17 Notre Dame Fighting Irish, who were led by Digger Phelps.
- March 2, 1978, West Virginia upset the #1-seed Rutgers 81–74 in Pittsburgh, with help from sophomore Lowes Moore.
- February 24, 1982, marked West Virginia's 82–77 win over Pittsburgh in front of a school-record 16,704 fans.
- February 27, 1983, West Virginia defeated #1 UNLV Runnin' Rebels basketball at home, 87–78.
- March 9, 1984, West Virginia tallied a 67–65 win over #15 Temple in the semifinals of the Atlantic 10 tournament.
- December 12, 1988, West Virginia defeats the Pittsburgh Panthers in double-overtime, 84–81.
- December 9, 1989, 97–93 in favor of West Virginia against the Pittsburgh Panthers in an overtime classic.
- February 11, 1998, West Virginia's 80–62 win over #6 UConn.
- March 15, 1998, #10 Seeded West Virginia defeats #2 seeded Cincinnati by a bank 3-pointer by Jarrod West with 0.8 seconds to play. Cincinnati was coached by former WVU head coach Bob Huggins.
- February 20, 2001, West Virginia walks away at WVU Coliseum with a double-overtime 107–100 win against Villanova.
- March 19, 2005, in a 111–105 double overtime win against Wake Forest in the second round of the NCAA tournament in Cleveland, Ohio.
- March 18, 2006, West Virginia defeats Northwestern State 67–54 in Kevin Pittsnogle, Mike Gansey, and the other seniors' last win as a Mountaineer. Five days later, in the Sweet 16, the Mountaineers lost to #2-seed Texas, 74–71 on a buzzer beater three-point shot.
- February 10, 2007, West Virginia defeated #2 UCLA 70–65 at the WVU Coliseum in front of a national television audience on CBS.
- March 29, 2007, West Virginia defeated Clemson 78–73 to win the university's second NIT Championship crown, the other in 1942. West Virginia was led by senior Frank Young's 24 points (6 of 7 for three-pointers) and five rebounds and freshman Da'Sean Butler's 20 points to win the championship.
- March 22, 2008, West Virginia defeated Duke, 73–67 at the Verizon Center, DC to advance to the Sweet 16.
- December 27, 2008, West Virginia defeated #13 Ohio State 76–48 in Columbus, Ohio, snapping the Buckeyes' 14-game home win streak which led the nation.
- February 13, 2009, West Virginia defeated #13 Villanova 93–72, led by Da'Sean Butler's 43 points
- March 7, 2009, against #6 Louisville in Morgantown, featuring the largest crowd ever for ESPN's College GameDay
- March 12, 2009, West Virginia upset the #2 Pittsburgh Panthers in the quarterfinal round of the Big East tournament 74–60.
- March 13, 2010, West Virginia, led by Da'Sean Butler's game-winning running jump-shot defeated #8 Georgetown to win its first Big East Conference tournament Championship.
- March 25, 2010, West Virginia sets a new record for most wins in a season with 30, in its 69–56 Sweet Sixteen win over Washington.
- March 27, 2010, West Virginia advances to its first Final Four since 1959 with a 73–66 victory over #1 seed Kentucky.
- January 12, 2016, #11 West Virginia upset #1 Kansas at the WVU Coliseum, forcing 22 turnovers. It was also their third straight home victory against Kansas.
- March 12, 2016, #9 West Virginia upset #6 Oklahoma in the Big 12 tournament, 69–67, after a made half-court shot by Buddy Hield of Oklahoma was disallowed when replay showed it was still in his hands as the clock expired. WVU went on to lose to Kansas in the Big 12 Tournament Final.
- January 10, 2017, #10 West Virginia upset #1 Baylor at the WVU Coliseum. With a final score of 89–68, WVU forced 29 turnovers in the Bears' first-ever game with the #1 ranking.
- December 29th,2019, West Virginia upsets #2 Ohio State Buckeyes men's basketball in Cleveland, Ohio at the Cleveland Classic Game 67-59 behind Freshman Miles McBride's 21 points.
- November 27, 2024, West Virginia upset #3 Gonzaga at the Battle 4 Atlantis. Final score 86–78 in overtime the first of 3 straight overtime games in the holiday tournament for WVU.
- December 31, 2024, West Virginia (missing 2 of top 3 scorers) upset #7 Kansas 62-61 at Allen Fieldhouse their first ever win at "The Phog". Also broke Kansas' conference opener 33 game win streak which dated back to 1991.
- January 18th, 2025, West Virginia defeats #2 Iowa State 64-57 with Javon Small scoring 27 points on Jerry West night breaking Iowa State's 12 game win streak which led the nation.
- April 5th,2026, West Virginia defeats Oklahoma 89-82 in the College Basketball Crown Championship behind a career high 38 points from Honor Huff and Chance Moores 19 points 10 rebounds in coach Ross Hodges first season at WVU.

== Rivals ==
=== Pittsburgh ===
With 184 games played between 1906 and 2012, West Virginia's rivalry against Pittsburgh, whose campus is roughly 80 miles north of WVU, is West Virginia's most-played men's basketball rivalry. This was an in-conference rivalry for many years: 1976 to 1982 in the Eastern Collegiate Basketball League and Eastern Athletic Association (predecessors to the Atlantic 10 Conference) and 1995 to 2012 in the Big East Conference. Following the conference realignment, West Virginia moved to the Big 12 Conference in 2012, and Pittsburgh moved to the Atlantic Coast Conference in 2013 and the series was put on hold until the 2017–2018 season. West Virginia has a 97–88 series lead.

=== Maryland ===
West Virginia's interstate rivalry against Maryland dates back to 1926. Except for a period when both schools were in the Southern Conference from 1950 to 1953, this has been primarily an out-of-conference rivalry. From the 1963–64 to 1970–71 seasons, the series was played twice a season, on a home-and-home basis. The series was again played annually from the 1983–84 to 1988–89 seasons then 1990–91 to 1992–93 seasons. In December 2003, the two schools played in Washington, D. C. for the BB&T Classic, with West Virginia winning 78–77 in overtime.

In May 2008, West Virginia assistant coach Billy Hahn announced that he and Maryland head coach Gary Williams proposed a home-and-home series that would begin after the 2008–09 season. This plan never materialized, but Maryland and West Virginia met again in the third round of the NCAA tournament on March 22, 2015, with West Virginia winning 69–59. The Mountaineers met Maryland once again in the NCAA Tournament in the Round of 64 on March 16, 2023 in which Maryland won 67-65.

=== Penn State ===
West Virginia had an interstate rivalry with Penn State from 1906 to 1991. The series was played twice annually from the 1982–83 to 1990–91 seasons, as both schools were in the Atlantic 10 Conference then. WVU leads the series 66–53.

=== Virginia Tech ===
West Virginia has an interstate multisport rivalry with the Virginia Tech Hokies. Although the rivalry is heavily focused on football, it also spans to other collegiate sports between the two schools, including basketball. The location of Virginia Tech in Blacksburg, Virginia, along the Appalachian Mountains puts it in direct competition with West Virginia University. It is not uncommon to see families along the Virginia/West Virginia border to be split between the two rivals. WVU leads the series 49-30.

== Postseason ==
=== NCAA tournament results ===
The Mountaineers have appeared in the NCAA tournament 31 times. Their combined record is 38–31.

Year	Round	Opponent	Result
1955	First round	LaSalle	L 61–95
1956	First round	Dartmouth	L 59–61 ^{OT}
1957	First round	Canisius	L 56–64
1958	First round	Manhattan	L 84–89
1959	First round Sweet Sixteen; Elite Eight; Final Four; National Championship Game	Dartmouth; Saint Joseph's; Boston University; Louisville; California	W 82–68; W 95–92; W 86–82; W 94–79; L 70–71
1960	First round Sweet Sixteen; Regional third-place game	Navy; NYU; Saint Joseph's	W 94–86; L 81–82 ^{OT} W 106–100
1962	First round	Villanova	L 75–90
1963	First round Sweet Sixteen; Regional third-place game	Connecticut; Saint Joseph's; NYU	W 77–71; L 88–97; W 83–73
1965	First round	Providence	L 67–91
1967	First round	Princeton	L 59–68
1982	First round Second round	North Carolina A&T; Fresno State	W 62–53; L 56–97
1983	First round	James Madison	L 50–57
1984	First round Second round	Oregon State; Maryland	W 64–62; L 77–102
1986	First round	Old Dominion	L 64–72
1987	First round	Western Kentucky	L 62–64
1989	First round Second round	Tennessee; Duke	W 84–68; L 63–70
1992	First round	Missouri	L 78–89
1998	First round Second round Sweet Sixteen	Temple; Cincinnati; Utah	W 82–52; W 75–74; L 62–65
2005	First round Second round Sweet Sixteen; Elite Eight	Creighton; Wake Forest; Texas Tech; Louisville	W 63–61; W 111–105 ^{2OT} W 65–60; L 75–83 ^{OT}
2006	First round Second round Sweet Sixteen	Southern Illinois; Northwestern State; Texas	W 64–46; W 67–54; L 71–74
2008	First round Second round Sweet Sixteen	Arizona; Duke; Xavier	W 75–65; W 73–67; L 75–79 ^{OT}
2009	First round	Dayton	L 60–68
2010	First round Second round Sweet Sixteen; Elite Eight; Final Four	Morgan State; Missouri; Washington; Kentucky; Duke	W 77–50; W 68–59; W 69–56; W 73–66; L 57–78
2011	First round Second round	Clemson; Kentucky	W 84–76; L 63–71
2012	First round	Gonzaga	L 54–77
2015	First round Second round Sweet Sixteen	Buffalo; Maryland; Kentucky	W 68–62; W 69–59; L 39–78
2016	First round	Stephen F. Austin	L 56–70
2017	First round Second round Sweet Sixteen	Bucknell; Notre Dame; Gonzaga	W 86–80; W 83–71; L 58–61
2018	First round Second round Sweet Sixteen	Murray State; Marshall; Villanova	W 85–68; W 94–71; L 78–90
2021	First round Second round	Morehead State; Syracuse	W 84–67; L 72–75
2023	First round	Maryland	L 65–67

=== NCAA tournament seeding history ===
The NCAA began seeding the tournament in 1978.

Years →	'82	'83	'84	'86	'87	'89	'92	'98	'05	'06	'08	'09	'10	'11	'12	'15	'16	'17	'18	'21	'23
Seeds→	5	7	11	9	7	7	12	10	7	6	7	6	2	5	10	5	3	4	5	3	9

=== NIT results ===
The Mountaineers have appeared in the National Invitation Tournament (NIT) 16 times. Their combined record is 21–16. They are two time NIT Champions (1942, 2007).

Year	Round	Opponent	Result
1942	Quarterfinals; Semifinals; Championship	Long Island; Toledo; Western Kentucky State	W 58–49; W 51–39; W 47–45
1945	Quarterfinals	DePaul	L 52–76
1946	Quarterfinals; Semifinals; Third-place game	St. John's; Kentucky; Muhlenberg	W 70–58; L 51–59; W 65–40
1947	Quarterfinals; Semifinals; Third-place game	Bradley; Utah; NC State	W 69–60; L 64–62; L 52–64
1968	First round	Dayton	L 68–87
1981	First round Second round Quarterfinals; Semifinals; Third-place game	Penn; Temple; Minnesota; Tulsa; Purdue	W 67–64; W 77–76; W 80–69; L 89–87; L 72–75 ^{OT}
1985	First round	Virginia	L 55–56
1988	First round	Connecticut	L 57–62
1991	First round Second round	Furman; Providence	W 86–67; L 79–85
1993	First round Second round	Georgia; Providence	W 95–84; L 67–68
1994	First round Second round	Davidson; Clemson	W 85–69; L 79–96
1997	First round Second round Quarterfinals	Bowling Green; NC State; Florida State	W 85–69; W 76–73; L 71–76
2001	First round	Richmond	L 56–79
2004	Opening Round; First round Second round	Kent State; Rhode Island; Rutgers	W 65–54; W 79–72; L 64–67
2007	First round Second round Quarterfinals; Semifinals; Championship	Delaware State; Massachusetts; NC State; Mississippi State; Clemson	W 74–50; W 90–77; W 71–66; W 63–62; W 78–73
2014	First round	Georgetown	L 65–77

=== CBC results ===
The Mountaineers have appeared in one College Basketball Crown (CBC). Their record is 3–0. They were champions in 2026.

Year	Round	Opponent	Result
2026	Quarterfinals; Semifinals; Championship	Stanford; Creighton; Oklahoma	W 82–77^{OT} W 87–70; W 89–82^{OT}

=== CBI Results ===
The Mountaineers have appeared in the Division I College Basketball Invitational (CBI) tournament one time. Their record is 1–1.

Year	Round	Opponent	Result
2019	First round Quarterfinals	Grand Canyon; Coastal Carolina	W 77–63; L 91–109

== Notable players ==
=== Retired numbers ===
The Mountaineers have retired three jerseys in their history.

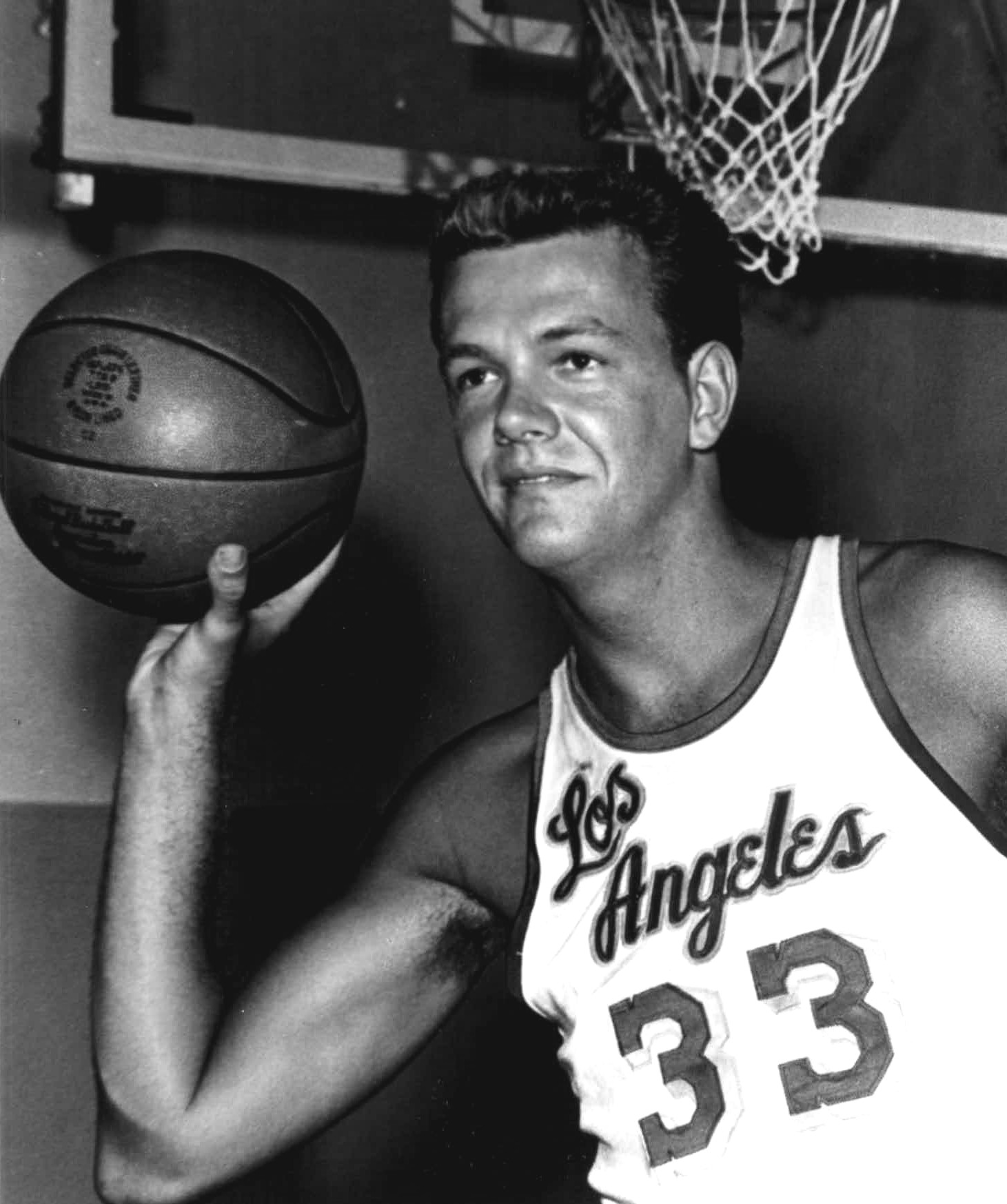
Hot Rod Hundley, whose #33 was retired by West Virginia

West Virginia Mountaineers retired numbers
No.	Player	Pos.	Career	No. Ret.	Ref.
33	Hot Rod Hundley	PG / SG	1954–1957	2010	
44	Jerry West	SG	1957–1960	2005	
44	Rod Thorn	PG / SG	1960–1963	2020	

=== Mountaineers in the Naismith Memorial Hall of Fame ===
- Bob Huggins, inducted in 2022 (as a coach)
- Rod Thorn, inducted in 2018
- Jerry West, inducted in 1980

=== All-Americans ===
The following players were named to All-American teams recognized by the NCAA for the purpose of determining consensus teams for the given season.

Player	Year(s)	Team(s)
Marshall Glenn	1929	College Humor (2nd)
Scotty Hamilton	1942	Helms (1st)
Joseph Walthall	1943	Sporting News (3rd)
Leland Byrd	1947	Helms (1st)
Mark Workman	1951	AP (3rd), Look (3rd)
Mark Workman	1952	Consensus Second Team – AP (1st), UPI (1st), Look (1st), Collier's (2nd)
Hot Rod Hundley	1956	Consensus Second Team – AP (2nd), UPI (2nd), NEA (2nd), INS (2nd), Collier's (3rd)
Hot Rod Hundley	1957	Consensus First Team – AP (1st), USBWA (1st), NABC (1st), UPI (1st), NEA (2nd), INS (2nd)
Lloyd Sharrar	1958	AP (2nd), NABC (3rd), UPI (3rd)
Jerry West	1958	AP (3rd), UPI (3rd)
Jerry West	1959	Consensus First Team – AP (1st), USBWA (1st), NABC (1st), UPI (1st), NEA (1st)
Jerry West	1960	Consensus First Team – AP (1st), USBWA (1st), NABC (1st), UPI (1st), NEA (1st), Sporting News (1st)
Rod Thorn	1962	Consensus Second Team – AP (2nd), NABC (3rd), UPI (2nd), Sporting News (1st)
Rod Thorn	1963	Consensus Second Team – AP (2nd), USBWA (1st), NABC (2nd), UPI (2nd)
Wil Robinson	1972	AP (3rd)
Kevin Pittsnogle	2006	NABC (3rd)
Kevin Jones	2012	Consensus Second Team – AP (2nd), USBWA (2nd), NABC (2nd), Sporting News (3rd)
Jevon Carter	2018	Consensus Second Team – AP (2nd), NABC (3rd), Sporting News (2nd)

=== School records ===
==== Career leaders ====
- Points scored: Jerry West (2,309)
- Rebounds: Jerry West (1,240)
- Assists: Steve Berger (574)
- Steals: Jevon Carter (330)
- Games played: Da'Sean Butler (146)
- Games started: Johannes Herber (128)
- Double-doubles: Jerry West (70)
- 30-point games: Jerry West (29)
- 3-pointers: Alex Ruoff (261)
- Blocked shots: Sagaba Konate (191)

==== Single-season leaders ====
- Points scored: Jerry West (908, 1960)
- Rebounds: Jerry West, (510, 1960)
- Assists: Jevon Carter (246, 2018)
- Steals: Jevon Carter (112, 2018)
- Double-doubles: Jerry West (30, 1960)
- 30-point games: Jerry West (15, 1960)
- Blocked shots: D'or Fischer (124, 2004)

==== Single-game leaders ====
- Points scored: Rod Hundley (54, vs Furman 1957)
- Rebounds: Mack Isner/Jerry West (31, vs Virginia Tech/George Washington University 1952/1960)
- Assists: Steve Berger (16, vs Pittsburgh 1989)
- Steals: Drew Schifino (11, vs Arkansas-Monticello 2001)
- Triple-doubles: Rod Thorn (28 points-13 rebounds-11 assists, vs St. Bonaventure 1962)
- 3-pointers: Alex Ruoff (9, vs Radford 2008)
- Blocked shots: D'or Fischer/Sagaba Konate (9, vs Rhode Island/Baylor University 2004/2018)

=== Mountaineers in the NBA ===
==== Current players ====
- Jevon Carter, basketball player for the Chicago Bulls
- Joe Mazzulla, head coach for the Boston Celtics and 2024 NBA Finals Champion
- Miles McBride, basketball player for the New York Knicks
- Javon Small, basketball player for the Memphis Grizzlies

==== Former players ====
- Jerome Anderson, former NBA player
- Ed Beach, former NBA player
- Jesse Edwards, former NBA player
- Hot Rod Hundley, first overall pick of 1957 NBA draft and All-Star
- Lowes Moore, former NBA player
- Tony Robertson, former NBA player
- Fred Schaus, former NBA All-Star and head coach of the Los Angeles Lakers
- Bobby Smith, former basketball player for Los Angeles Lakers
- Rod Thorn, former NBA player and executive; inducted into Naismith Memorial Basketball Hall of Fame
- Jerry West, former NBA All-Star and NBA champion with the Los Angeles Lakers (1960–74); later coach and general manager of the Lakers; won four NBA championships as Lakers GM; inducted into the Naismith Memorial Basketball Hall of Fame in 1980
- Ron Williams, drafted by San Francisco Warriors, ninth overall pick in 1968 NBA draft; drafted by Dallas Cowboys in the 1968 NFL/AFL draft
- Mark Workman, first overall pick in the 1952 NBA draft

=== Mountaineers in overseas leagues and G-League ===
==== Current and former players ====
- Joe Alexander, basketball player for Maccabi Haifa of the Israeli Liga Leumit
- Gary Browne, basketball player for S.E. Melbourne Phoenix of the Australian National Basketball League
- Derek Culver, basketball player for Rayos de Hermosillo of the Circuito de Baloncesto de la Costa del Pacífico
- Devin Ebanks, basketball player for Al-Ahli of the Saudi Premier League
- D'or Fischer, American-Israeli basketball player in the Israeli National League
- Kevin Jones, basketball player for Sun Rockers Shibuya of the B.League in Japan
- Sagaba Konate, basketball player for Samsunspor of the Turkey Basketbol Süper Ligi
- Daxter Miles Jr., basketball player for Salt Lake City Stars of the G-League
- Gabe Osabuohien, basketball player for Cleveland Charge of the U.S. G-League
- Jaysean Paige, basketball player for Mets de Guaynabo of the Baloncesto Superior Nacional (BSN)
- Tarik Phillip (born 1993), British-American basketball player in the Israel Basketball Premier League
- Taz Sherman, basketball player for Kobrat of the Finnish Korisliiga basketball league
- Erik Stevenson, basketball player for Capital City Go-Go of the U.S. G-League
- Devin Williams, basketball player for Taoyuan Taiwan Beer Leopards of the Taiwan Professional Basketball League

== See also ==
- West Virginia Mountaineers women's basketball
