= Ja Morant =

American basketball player (born 1999)

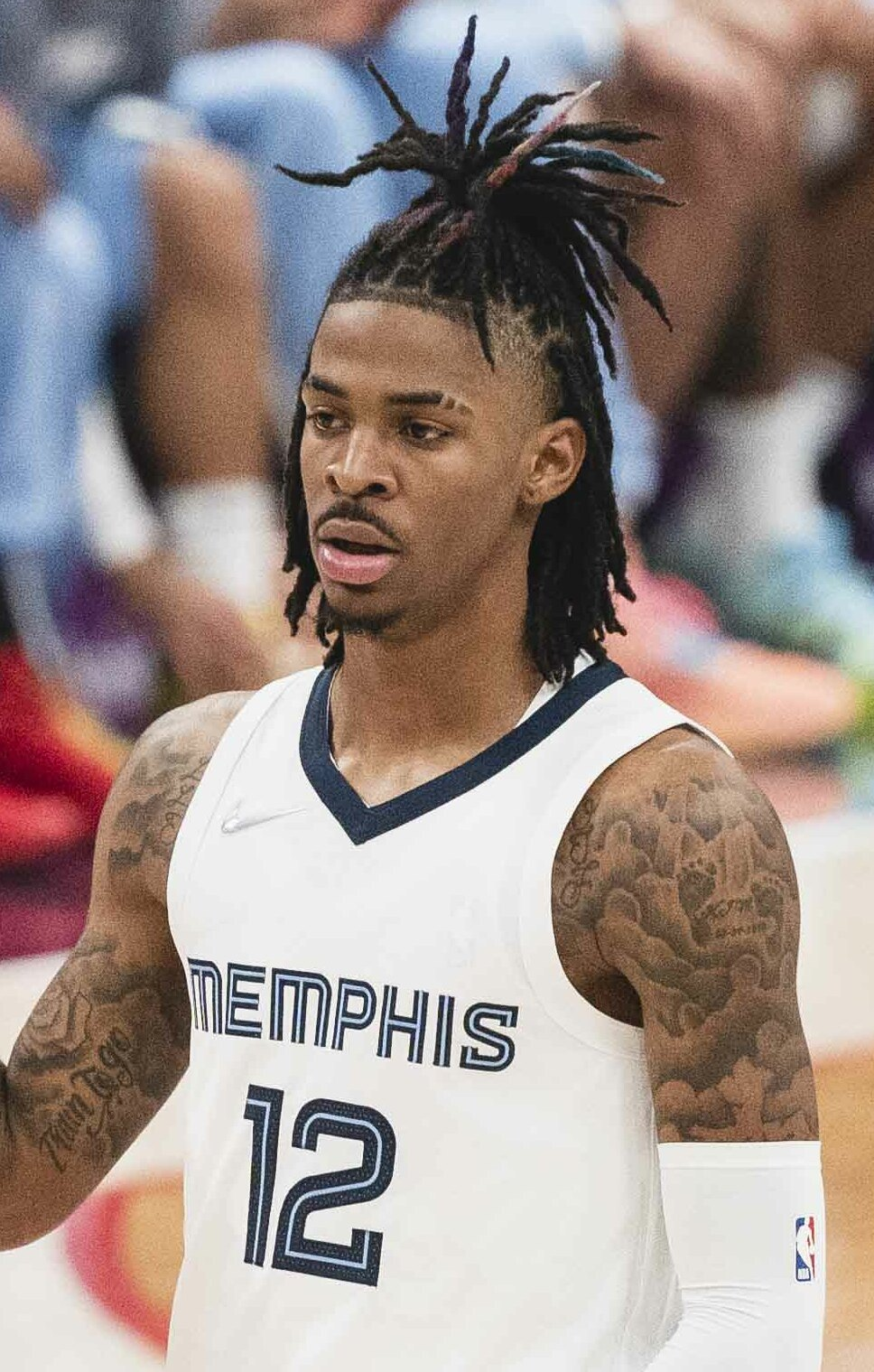
- Morant with the Memphis Grizzlies in 2021

No. 1 – Portland Trail Blazers
- Position: Point guard
- League: NBA

Personal information
- Born: August 10, 1999 (age 27) Dalzell, South Carolina, U.S.
- Listed height: 6 ft 2 in (1.88 m)
- Listed weight: 174 lb (79 kg)

Career information
- High school: Crestwood (Sumter, South Carolina)
- College: Murray State (2017–2019)
- NBA draft: 2019: 1st round, 2nd overall pick
- Drafted by: Memphis Grizzlies
- Playing career: 2019–present

Career history
- 2019–2026: Memphis Grizzlies
- 2026–present: Portland Trail Blazers

Career highlights
- 2× NBA All-Star (2022, 2023); All-NBA Second Team (2022); NBA Most Improved Player (2022); NBA Rookie of the Year (2020); NBA All-Rookie First Team (2020); Consensus first-team All-American (2019); Lute Olson Award (2019); Bob Cousy Award (2019); NCAA assists leader (2019); OVC Player of the Year (2019); 2× First-team All-OVC (2018, 2019); OVC tournament MVP (2019); OVC All-Newcomer Team (2018); No. 12 retired by Murray State Racers
- Stats at NBA.com
- Stats at Basketball Reference

Temetrius Jamel Morant (/ˈdʒɑː məˈrænt/ JAH mə-RANT; born August 10, 1999) is an American professional basketball player for the Portland Trail Blazers of the National Basketball Association (NBA). He played college basketball for the Murray State Racers, where he was a consensus first-team All-American as a sophomore in 2019.

Morant was only lightly recruited by NCAA Division I programs and unranked by recruiting services, despite having been named All-Region Most Valuable Player three times and earning All-State honors at Crestwood High School in Sumter, South Carolina. Nevertheless, he made an immediate impact at Murray State University, earning first-team all-conference honors in the Ohio Valley Conference (OVC) as a freshman. He had a breakout sophomore season; it saw him win OVC Player of the Year as well as lead the NCAA in assists. As a sophomore, Morant became the first player in NCAA history to average 20-plus points and 10-plus assists per game for a single season.

Morant was selected by the Memphis Grizzlies with the second overall pick in the 2019 NBA draft, and was named the NBA Rookie of the Year in 2020. In 2022, he was named to his first NBA All-Star Game as a starter. At the conclusion of the season, Morant won the NBA Most Improved Player Award and was selected to his first All-NBA Team. Following numerous off-the-court incidents and injury-riddled seasons, he was traded to the Trail Blazers during the 2026 off-season.

== Early life ==
Temetrius Jamel Morant was born in Dalzell, South Carolina, on August 10, 1999, to Tee and Jamie Morant. His mother, Jamie, was a point guard in high school and a softball player in college, while his father was a high school teammate of Ray Allen and played basketball for Claflin University. After playing semi-professionally, Tee considered playing professional basketball overseas, but when Jamie became pregnant with Ja, he abandoned his basketball career and stayed at home, becoming a barber instead.

Morant trained in his backyard with his father, Tee Morant, who taught him step-back jump shots and bought tractor tires for him to practice jumping with a soft landing. In his childhood, he often faced older opponents, telling his mother, "I'm not worried about the big kids." Morant played in the Amateur Athletic Union (AAU) circuit with the South Carolina Hornets, a small grassroots team based in Columbia, South Carolina. For one season, he was teammates with Zion Williamson, who became one of the top players in the 2018 class.

Morant attended Crestwood High School in Sumter, South Carolina. He grew from 5 ft 9 in (1.75 m) to 6 ft 0 in (1.83 m) in his first three years with the team. Morant left as its all-time leading scorer, with 1,679 points, and scored a career-high 47 points against Sumter High School. In his last two seasons at Crestwood, he averaged 27 points, 8 rebounds, and 8 assists per game, earning South Carolina Class 3A All-State honors both years. Morant also left high school as a three-time All-Region Most Valuable Player (MVP). He could not dunk until he was a senior.

Morant was not ranked in the class of 2017 by recruiting services ESPN, 247Sports, or Rivals. His only high major NCAA Division I offer came from South Carolina. He was accidentally discovered by mid-major program Murray State of the OVC in July 2016, when assistant coach James Kane attended a camp hoping to see a player who was joining his team. While looking for a snack, Kane noticed Morant playing a three-on-three game in an auxiliary gym; impressed, he contacted head coach Matt McMahon, who soon offered Morant a scholarship. On September 3, 2016, Morant committed to playing for Murray State during dinner at McMahon's house. His father said, "Every parent wants their child to play at a big-time program, but what I realized is, don't go where you want to be, go to where they want you." His other Division I offers included Duquesne, Maryland Eastern Shore, South Carolina State, and Wofford.

== College career ==
=== Freshman year ===
On November 10, 2017, Morant debuted for Murray State with 7 points and a team-high 11 assists in a 118–61 victory over Brescia University of the National Association of Intercollegiate Athletics (NAIA). He recorded his first career double-double on December 12, 2017, with 10 points, 12 rebounds, and 6 assists in a 69–55 loss to Saint Louis. He posted his first triple-double on December 28, recording 11 points, 10 rebounds, and 14 assists in an 80–52 win over Eastern Illinois. It was the second triple-double in school history, the first coming from Isacc Miles in 1984, and was also the record for most assists at a CFSB Center game, surpassing the old mark of 12 established by Aubrey Reese against Alabama State in 1999. Morant also had the third-most assists in a single game by a Murray State player. On February 1, 2018, he scored a season-high 23 points against Southeast Missouri State. After averaging 12.7 points, 6.5 rebounds, and 6.3 assists per game, Morant earned first-team All-OVC with his teammates Jonathan Stark and Terrell Miller, and OVC All-Newcomer Team accolades. His 6.3 assists per game ranked 14th in the nation his freshman season. He became the seventh freshman in 25 years to accumulate 150 assists, 150 rebounds, and 10 blocks while shooting at least 42 percent from the field. Morant and Murray State advanced to the NCAA Tournament his freshman season after capturing an OVC championship in a 68–51 win over Belmont. Morant had 15 points, 5 assists, and 5 rebounds in that game. Murray State would lose in its opening round game to West Virginia, however, falling 85–68 despite Morant's 14 points.

=== Sophomore year ===
Morant began to register on the radar of some scouts the summer of his sophomore season in 2018. He was one of 20 players invited to Chris Paul's Elite Guard Camp, which Morant called, "an honor". When his sophomore season began, Morant assumed a leading role for Murray State with the departures of key players Jonathan Stark and Terrell Miller. In his season debut, he recorded 26 points and 11 assists in a 74–53 win against Wright State. On November 24, 2018, Morant posted 29 points, a season-high 13 rebounds, and 12 assists in a 77–66 win over Missouri State, becoming the first Murray State player to ever record multiple triple-doubles. In his next game, he scored a season-high 38 points in a 78–72 loss to Alabama, the 12th-most single-game points by a player in school history. By around December 2018, Morant was almost unanimously projected as a top-five selection in the 2019 NBA draft, and in late January 2019, at least one outlet forecasted him as the first overall selection. At that time, then-Yahoo! Sports journalist Pat Forde wrote, "He seems almost certain to be the first top-ten pick from a mid-major school in five years (Elfrid Payton, Louisiana–Lafayette), and could be the first true mid-major pick in the top five since Michael Olowokandi of Pacific went No. 1 in 1998." (Note: Forde did not consider two top-five selections between 1998 and 2018 from schools outside the traditional power conferences to be "true mid-majors", saying "Lamar Odom, the No. 4 pick in 1999 out of Rhode Island, really doesn't fit the mid-major profile. He was a hugely celebrated recruit who took a rather scandalous route to a second-tier program. Neither does Adam Morrison, the No. 3 pick in 2006 out of decided non-mid-major Gonzaga.")

On January 10, 2019, Morant was named to the midseason top 25 watch list for the John R. Wooden Award. On the same day, he broke the school record for most assists in a single game, with 18, while scoring 26 points against UT Martin. He established a new scoring career high nine days later on January 19, when he recorded 40 points, 11 assists, and 5 steals, shooting 21-of-21 from the free throw line, in a victory over SIU Edwardsville. He broke the OVC record for most consecutive free throws made in a game, and he became the tenth player in Murray State history to record a 40-point game. Morant also became the first NCAA Division I men's player in 20 years to tally at least 40 points, 10 assists, and 5 steals in a single game. On February 2, Morant collected 28 points and 7 assists in a 67–63 win over Tennessee Tech. He broke the school single-season assist record of 212 set by Chad Townsend in the 1996–97 season. After posting 25 points, 8 rebounds, and 14 assists in a 102–70 victory over Eastern Kentucky, Morant became the 46th Murray State player with 1,000 career points and eclipsed the OVC record for single-season assists previously held for 32 years by Duane Washington of Middle Tennessee.

At the end of the regular season, he was named OVC Player of the Year and first-team All-OVC, while leading the NCAA Division I in assists. He later earned first-team All-American honors from the United States Basketball Writers Association and second-team All-American honors from The Sporting News. On March 8, in the semifinals of the OVC tournament versus Jacksonville State, Morant scored 29 points, including a game-winning three-point play. One day later, he recorded 36 points, 7 rebounds, and 3 assists in a 77–65 upset victory over the Belmont Bruins, who were playing without injured first team All-OVC center Nick Muszynski, for the OVC Tournament title. Morant was subsequently named the tournament's MVP. On March 21, in an 83–64 win over fifth-seeded Marquette in the first round of the 2019 NCAA tournament, Morant posted 17 points, 11 rebounds, and 16 assists. He became the eighth player to officially record a triple-double in the history of the tournament, and the first player since Draymond Green in 2012. (Note: The NCAA's official Division I record book only recognizes triple-doubles that took place in seasons in which the NCAA kept track of the relevant statistical categories throughout Division I. Assists were recorded in the 1950–51 and 1951–52 seasons, but were not recorded again until 1983–84. Blocked shots and steals were first officially kept in 1985–86. Some listings of tournament triple-doubles include games that took place in tournaments in which the official scorers kept count of all relevant statistics, but the NCAA did not.) In the second round, he chipped in 28 points in a season-ending 90–62 loss to fourth-seeded Florida State. During the game, Morant set school records for career assists and single-season points. He closed his sophomore campaign averaging 24.5 points, 5.7 rebounds, 10 assists, and 1.8 steals per game. Morant became the first NCAA player to ever average at least 20 points and 10 assists per game in a single season.

Following Murray State's loss in the 2019 NCAA men's basketball tournament, Morant announced his intention to forgo his final two seasons of collegiate eligibility and declare for the 2019 NBA draft.

== Professional career ==
=== Memphis Grizzlies (2019–2026) ===
==== 2019–20 season: Rookie of the Year ====
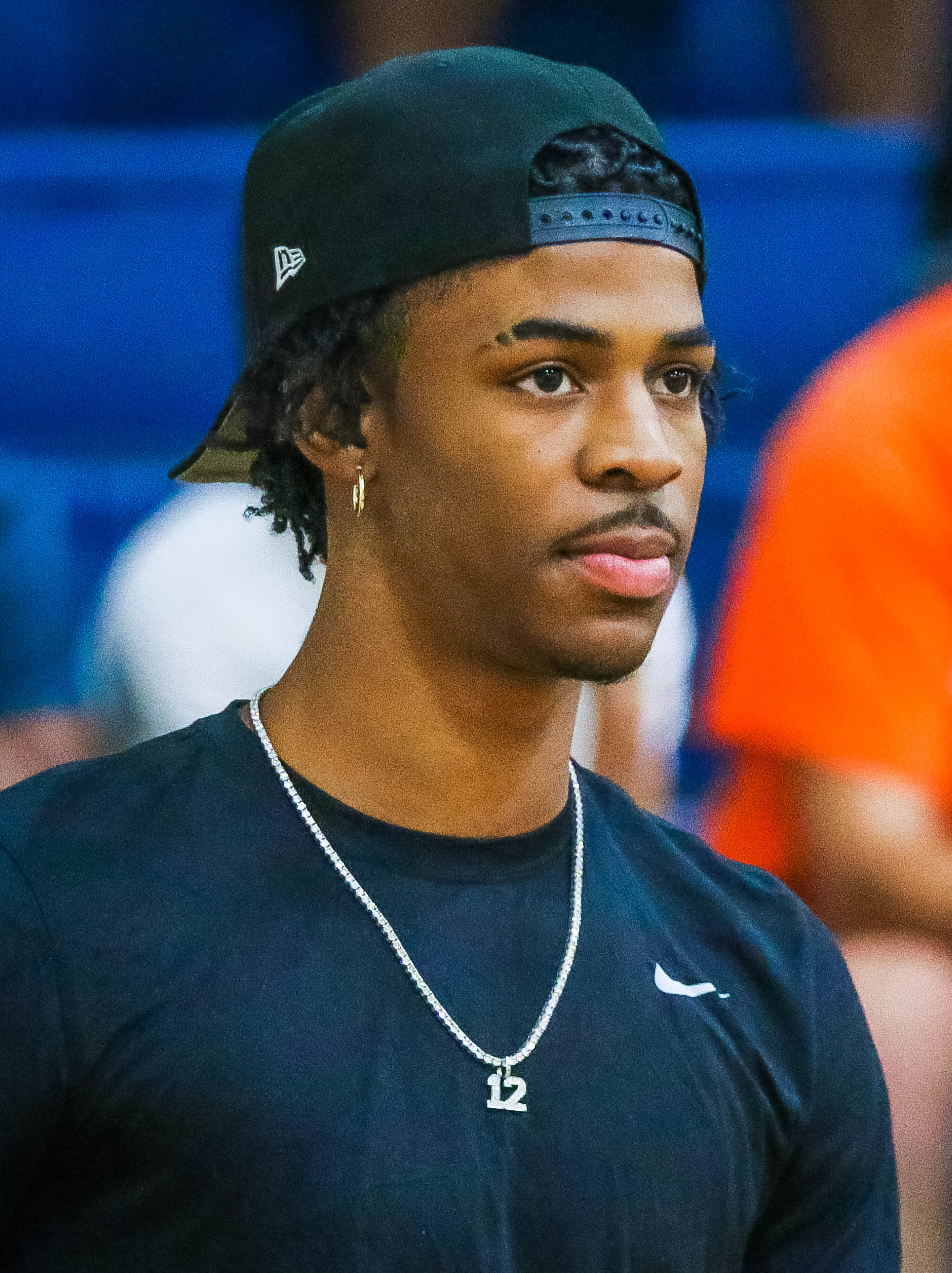
Morant in 2019

Morant was drafted second overall during the 2019 NBA draft by the Memphis Grizzlies. On July 2, 2019, he signed a four-year contract worth $39.6 million with the Grizzlies. On October 23, 2019, Morant made his NBA debut, starting in a 101–120 loss to the Miami Heat with 14 points, 4 rebounds, 4 assists, a steal and a block. On November 13, he recorded his first career double-double with 23 points and 11 assists, and hit a game winning layup in a 117–115 victory over the Charlotte Hornets. On February 9, 2020, he recorded his first career triple-double in a 106–99 win over the Washington Wizards. Morant was selected to the Rising Stars Game for the 2019–20 season. In the 2019–20 season, Morant led all rookies in assists with an average of 7.1 assists per game, as well as total points scored, with 1,138 (17.8 points per game). At the end of the season, he was named the NBA Rookie of the Year and earned the NBA All-Rookie First Team honor.

==== 2020–21 season: First playoff appearance ====
On December 23, 2020, Morant recorded a then career-high 44 points, alongside nine assists, two rebounds, and two steals in a 131–119 loss to the San Antonio Spurs.

On May 21, 2021, in the newly implemented play-in tournament, with the eighth and final playoff spot on the line, Morant recorded 35 points, 6 rebounds and 6 assists to lead Memphis to a 117–112 overtime win over the Golden State Warriors, securing the Grizzlies' first postseason berth in four seasons. Two days later, he made his NBA playoff debut, scoring 26 points, 4 rebounds and 4 assists to help lead the Grizzlies to a 112–109 upset victory in Game 1 over the top-seeded Utah Jazz. Morant followed that up with 47 points and 7 assists in Game 2, but Memphis fell short, 141–129. The Grizzlies were eliminated, losing the series in five games.

==== 2021–22 season: First All-Star and All-NBA selections ====
On October 20, 2021, in the Grizzlies' season opener, Morant recorded 37 points and six assists in a 132–121 win over the Cleveland Cavaliers. On October 24, he scored 40 points while dishing out 10 assists in a 121–118 loss to the Los Angeles Lakers. On December 29, Morant put up a season-high 41 points, behind a career-high six made three-pointers, to lead Memphis to a 104–99 victory over the Lakers.

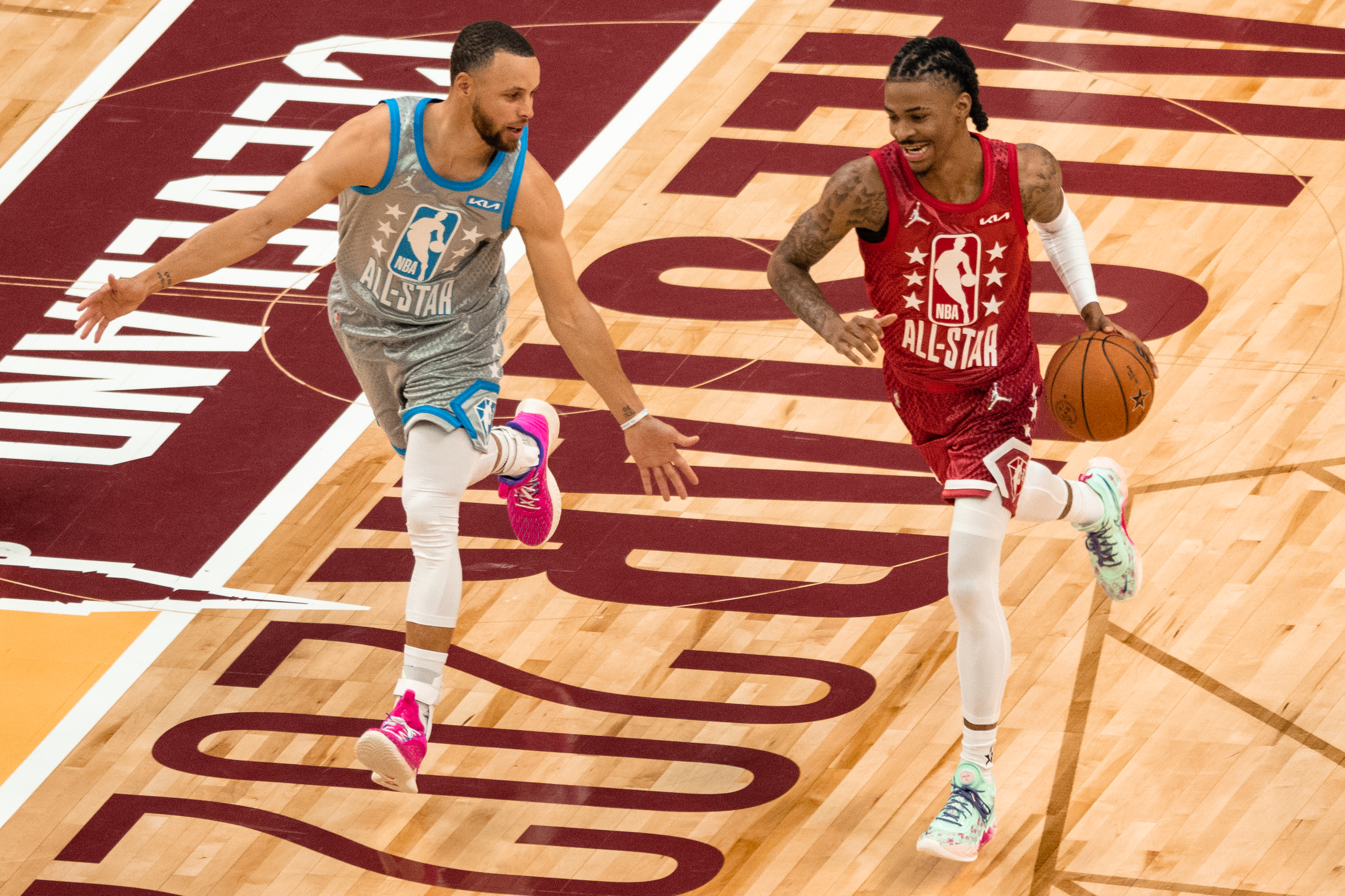
Morant (right) in the 2022 All-Star Game

On January 26, Morant tied his season-high 41 points, alongside 8 assists, 5 rebounds and 2 steals in a 118–110 win against the San Antonio Spurs. On January 27, Morant was selected to his first All-Star Game as a West Starter. The next day, Morant logged his fourth career triple-double with 30 points, 10 rebounds and 10 assists in a 119–109 win over the Utah Jazz. On February 16, Morant tied his then-career high with 44 points, including a career-high 20 points in the first quarter, grabbed 5 rebounds and delivered 11 assists in a 123–119 loss against the Portland Trail Blazers. On February 26, Morant scored a then-career-high 46 points in a 116–110 win over the Chicago Bulls. The total was the record for most points in a game by a Grizzlies player, breaking Mike Miller's record set in February 2007. On February 28, Morant bested this total, scoring a career-high 52 points, on an efficient 22-of-30 shooting, including 4-4 from beyond the arc, in a 118–105 win over the San Antonio Spurs. On March 18, he tweaked his right knee against the Atlanta Hawks and missed nine games. Morant led the Grizzlies to their first Southwest Division title in franchise history. Memphis also tied their franchise record with 56 wins. Despite missing 25 games during the regular season, he was named the winner of the NBA Most Improved Player Award.

On April 21, 2022, during Game 3 of the first round of the playoffs, Morant posted 16 points, 10 assists and 10 rebounds in a 104–95 Game 3 win over the Minnesota Timberwolves. It was the first postseason triple-double in Grizzlies franchise history. In Game 5, Morant scored the game-winning layup with one second left, finishing with 30 points, 13 rebounds and nine assists in a 111–109 win. He scored 18 of his 30 points in the fourth quarter. On May 3, during Game 2 of the second round of the playoffs Morant put up a playoff career-high 47 points along with 8 rebounds, 8 assists and 3 steals in a 106–101 win over the Golden State Warriors. He scored the last 15 points for Memphis and also became just the third player in NBA playoffs history to have multiple 45-point games before turning 23 years old, joining Kobe Bryant and LeBron James. On May 7, Morant injured his right knee in game 3 of the series and Memphis would go on to lose in 6 games. In the three games he played, he averaged 38.3 points per game on 50.6%/43.3%/85.7% shooting splits.

==== 2022–23 season: Contract extension and controversy ====
On July 6, 2022, Morant signed a five-year extension with the Grizzlies. The deal includes $193 million of guaranteed money, increasing to $231 million contingent upon his selection to an All-NBA team. On October 21, in the second game of the season, Morant recorded 49 points, 4 rebounds, 8 assists and 2 blocks on 17-of-26 shooting from the field in a 129–122 win over the Houston Rockets. He set the Grizzlies franchise mark for most points scored through the first two games of a season (83). On November 27, Morant put up his fifth career triple-double with 27 points, 10 rebounds, and 14 assists in a 127–123 win over the New York Knicks. He also tied Marc Gasol for the most triple-doubles in Grizzlies history. On December 7, Morant put up his sixth career triple-double with 26 points, 13 rebounds, and 11 assists In a 123–102 win over the Oklahoma City Thunder. He also surpassed Marc Gasol for the most triple-doubles in Grizzlies history.

On January 29, 2023, Morant put up his seventh career triple-double with 27 points, 10 rebounds, and 15 assists in a 112–100 win over the Indiana Pacers. He also became the first player in Grizzlies history to put up at least 25 points, 10 rebounds, and 15 assists in a game. On February 2, Morant was named to his second NBA All-Star Game as a reserve guard for the Western Conference. On February 28, Morant scored 28 of his 39 points in the third quarter and added 10 assists and 10 rebounds to achieve his 10th career triple-double in a 121–109 win over the Los Angeles Lakers. He made 10 of 12 shots in the highest-scoring quarter ever by a Grizzlies player.

In Game 3 of the Grizzlies' first round playoff series against the Los Angeles Lakers, Morant put up 45 points, with 22 of those coming from the fourth quarter, alongside 13 assists and nine rebounds in a 111–101 loss. His 22 points scored in the fourth quarter are the most points scored in a quarter in a playoff game in Grizzlies history. Memphis would go on to lose the series in 6 games.

===== Indiana Pacers incident =====
On February 5, 2023, The Athletic released a report describing an altercation between associates of Morant and members of the Indiana Pacers, whom the team played on January 29. During the game, Pacers guard Andrew Nembhard got into a verbal altercation with Morant's father. Morant then came over and exchanged words with Nembhard, and Pacers guard Chris Duarte also tried to engage in a physical altercation with Morant. Pacers forward James Johnson exchanged words with Davonte Pack, an associate of Morant, and Pack was subsequently removed from the game.

According to the website, acquaintances of Morant "aggressively confronted" members of the Pacers' party near their team bus. Later on, a person in an SUV, which Morant was riding in, allegedly pointed a red laser at the bus. Two members of the Pacers' party that spoke to The Athletic believed that the laser was attached to a gun. A Pacers security guard near the bus loading area remarked, "That's one hundred percent a gun" and another person present stated that they "felt we were in grave danger." The NBA later investigated the incident, interviewing multiple people and reviewing surveillance footage. Spokesman Mike Bass stated to The Athletic that while the league "substantiated that a postgame situation arose that was confrontational", they could not "corroborate that any individual threatened others with a weapon." Bass also said that "certain individuals involved" in the incidents were banned from attending games at FedEx Forum, the Grizzlies' arena. Morant later posted a tweet on Twitter, where he denied all allegations and clarified that Pack was banned from the Forum for a year.

===== Gun incidents =====
On March 4, 2023, it was revealed that the NBA had launched an investigation into an Instagram Live video of Morant displaying a gun at a Colorado nightclub earlier that morning, just hours after a loss to the eventual NBA champion Denver Nuggets. Later that day, the Grizzlies announced that Morant would be away from the team for at least two games. Morant also released an official statement on that day, stating that he would be leaving the team for an "indefinite amount of time" to find better resources to handle his stress, anxiety, and overall well-being. He also deactivated his Instagram and Twitter accounts. Shoe company Nike, which Morant has a partnership with, released a statement, saying "We appreciate Ja's accountability and that he is taking the time to get the help he needs. We support his prioritization of his well-being." Morant also reportedly entered a counseling program in Florida. On March 5, Grizzlies head coach Taylor Jenkins stated that there was no timetable for Morant's return to the team. On March 8, the Grizzlies announced that Morant would be away from the team for at least the next four games.

On March 15, Morant met with NBA commissioner Adam Silver in New York after exiting from his counseling program. Multiple top NBA executives also attended the meeting. The same day, the NBA announced that they had suspended Morant for eight games without pay for the nightclub incident. The suspension covered the six games that Morant had already missed as a result of his leave of absence from the Grizzlies, meaning he would be eligible to return to play as soon as March 20.

On May 14, two months after the first suspension, he was suspended from all team activities by the Grizzlies for flashing a gun during another Instagram Live session, in this instance on his friend Davonte Pack's account. Following the incident, Silver said he was "shocked" and that the league and the team would assess the extent of further disciplinary actions. On June 16, he was suspended for 25 games, provided that he fulfilled a league-sponsored program that addressed his wrongdoings.

==== 2023–24 season: Return from suspension and injury ====
On December 19, 2023, Morant returned from suspension, he scored 27 of his 34 points in the second half along with a game-winning shot in a 115–113 win against the New Orleans Pelicans. On January 8, 2024, it was reported that Morant would undergo a season-ending right shoulder surgery after sustaining a subluxation during team practice, ending his season with only nine games played.

==== 2024–25 season: Return from injury and continued controversies ====
Morant played in the Grizzlies' opening game, scoring 22 points and earning 10 assists. On November 6, he got injured attempting a dunk against the Los Angeles Lakers and missed 10 games. He said in early December that he would not attempt dunks anymore because of the risk of injury. Up to that point of the season, he had dunked only 4 times in 12 appearances.

On March 28, 2025, the Grizzlies fired coach Taylor Jenkins, who had been Morant's only head coach during his tenure with the team, with only nine games remaining in the 2024–25 regular season and the team nearly having secured entry into the 2025 NBA playoffs with a 44–29 record at the time. Frustrations among the team members from throughout the season began coming out following the shocking dismissal, notably with Morant having expressed frustration with his considerable decrease in touches, points, and efficiency.

On April 1, 2025, Morant and Golden State Warriors guard Buddy Hield made gun-aiming gestures at one another. The league briefly investigated the circumstance in light of Morant's history of firearms controversies and concluded that "the celebrations were not intended to be violent in nature, but inappropriate." Warnings were issued by the league to him and Hield about their conduct. In Morant's next game on April 3, he again made multiple gun-aiming gestures. He finished the game with his second career game-winning buzzer beater to beat the Miami Heat 110–108. When asked post-game about the criticism he has faced for his in-game gestures, he said that he was "well aware" and "kind of used to" what is said about him. Reflecting on the narrative around him, he said, "I was pretty much a villain for two years now. Every little thing, if somebody can say something negative about me, it's going to be out there. So, yeah. I don't care no more." The following day, Morant was fined $75,000 for his direct disregard of the warning he had received hours before the incident.

==== 2025–26 season: Injury-shortened again ====
In a game against the Atlanta Hawks on January 21, 2026, Morant suffered a UCL sprain in his left elbow. It was initially believed that he would miss several weeks, but on March 24 the team announced that he would miss the remainder of the season. This followed missing several weeks earlier in the season due to calf soreness. For the season he played in only 20 games, and only 79 total in the last three seasons. For the abbreviated season, Morant averaged 19.5 points per game.

=== Portland Trail Blazers (2026–present) ===
On June 29, 2026, Morant was traded to the Portland Trail Blazers in exchange for Jerami Grant and Kris Murray.

Morant made his Trail Blazers debut on October 21, recording 14 points, five rebounds, eight assists and three steals in a 124–83 win over the Phoenix Suns.

== Career statistics ==
Legend
| GP | Games played | GS | Games started | MPG | Minutes per game |
| FG% | Field goal percentage | 3P% | 3-point field goal percentage | FT% | Free throw percentage |
| RPG | Rebounds per game | APG | Assists per game | SPG | Steals per game |
| BPG | Blocks per game | PPG | Points per game | **Bold** | Career high |

=== NBA ===
==== Regular season ====
| Year | Team | GP | GS | MPG | FG% | 3P% | FT% | RPG | APG | SPG | BPG | PPG |
|---|---|---|---|---|---|---|---|---|---|---|---|---|
| 2019–20 | Memphis | **67** | **67** | 31.0 | .477 | .335 | .776 | 3.9 | 7.3 | .9 | .3 | 17.8 |
| 2020–21 | Memphis | 63 | 63 | 32.6 | .449 | .303 | .728 | 4.0 | 7.4 | .9 | .2 | 19.1 |
| 2021–22 | Memphis | 57 | 57 | 33.1 | **.493** | **.344** | .761 | 5.7 | 6.7 | **1.2** | .4 | **27.4** |
| 2022–23 | Memphis | 61 | 59 | 31.9 | .466 | .307 | .748 | **5.9** | **8.1** | 1.1 | .3 | 26.2 |
| 2023–24 | Memphis | 9 | 9 | **35.3** | .471 | .275 | .813 | 5.6 | **8.1** | .8 | **.6** | 25.1 |
| 2024–25 | Memphis | 50 | 50 | 30.4 | .454 | .309 | .824 | 4.1 | 7.3 | **1.2** | .2 | 23.2 |
| 2025–26 | Memphis | 20 | 20 | 28.5 | .410 | .235 | **.897** | 3.3 | **8.1** | 1.0 | .3 | 19.5 |
| Career | | 327 | 325 | 31.7 | .466 | .311 | .773 | 4.6 | 7.4 | 1.0 | .3 | 22.4 |
| All-Star | | 2 | 2 | 18.8 | .600 | .000 | — | 2.0 | 3.0 | .5 | .0 | 6.0 |

==== Playoffs ====
| Year | Team | GP | GS | MPG | FG% | 3P% | FT% | RPG | APG | SPG | BPG | PPG |
|---|---|---|---|---|---|---|---|---|---|---|---|---|
| 2021 | Memphis | 5 | 5 | **40.6** | **.487** | .323 | **.775** | 4.8 | 8.2 | .4 | .0 | **30.2** |
| 2022 | Memphis | **9** | **9** | 37.6 | .440 | .340 | .747 | **8.0** | **9.8** | **2.0** | .4 | 27.1 |
| 2023 | Memphis | 5 | 5 | 37.4 | .425 | **.419** | .769 | 6.8 | 7.0 | 1.8 | .2 | 24.6 |
| 2025 | Memphis | 3 | 3 | 27.3 | .415 | .250 | .636 | 2.0 | 5.0 | .7 | **.7** | 18.3 |
| Career | | 22 | 22 | 36.8 | .445 | .344 | .750 | 6.2 | 8.1 | 1.4 | .3 | 26.0 |

=== College ===
| * | Led NCAA Division I |

| Year | Team | GP | GS | MPG | FG% | 3P% | FT% | RPG | APG | SPG | BPG | PPG |
|---|---|---|---|---|---|---|---|---|---|---|---|---|
| 2017–18 | Murray State | 32 | 32 | 34.0 | .459 | .307 | .806 | **6.5** | 6.3 | .9 | .4 | 12.7 |
| 2018–19 | Murray State | **33** | **33** | **36.6** | **.499** | **.363** | **.813** | 5.7 | **10.0*** | **1.8** | **.8** | **24.5** |
| Career | | 65 | 65 | 35.3 | .485 | .343 | .810 | 6.1 | 8.2 | 1.4 | .6 | 18.7 |

== Personal life ==
Morant has a younger sister, Teniya, who grew up playing basketball with him in their backyard and now competes for Mississippi Valley State. He has the words "beneath no one", advice his mother gave him, tattooed on his left arm. His athleticism often draws comparisons to Russell Westbrook, who Morant said is his favorite player because Westbrook is often overlooked, just like he was by college recruiters in high school.

Morant has a daughter who was born on August 7, 2019.

=== Legal issues ===
In September 2022, Morant was named a defendant in a lawsuit filed in Shelby County, Tennessee. In the suit, the plaintiff accused him of punching a 17-year-old male during a pickup basketball game at Morant's home in July of that year. Morant and the 17-year-old had reportedly engaged in a verbal altercation during the game, and the 17-year-old "accidentally" hit Morant. Morant then punched the 17-year-old and knocked him to the ground, after which he struck him an additional number of times. When responding officials questioned him, Morant claimed that he acted in self-defense and stated that the 17-year-old had threatened him immediately following the incident. A representative for the Shelby County district attorney's office stated there "was not enough evidence to proceed with a case."

On March 1, 2023, The Washington Post released a report that further detailed the incident. After the altercation, Morant allegedly went inside his house and came out with a gun tucked in his waistband. The 17-year-old's mother later took the boy to the hospital and filed a police report. The police report also alleged that Morant had threatened a head of security at a mall located in Memphis four days before the altercation with the 17-year-old male. In the report, it claimed that Morant's mother got into a verbal altercation with an employee at a Finish Line store inside the mall, and she subsequently called Morant for help. Morant then entered the mall with an entourage of at least nine people and was confronted by the head of security. Morant refused to leave the mall's parking lot, and authorities later arrived at the mall. As the group was leaving the premises, Morant allegedly stated, "Let me find out what time he gets off." A member of Morant's entourage allegedly pushed the head of security, who intended to file a report on the incident because he "felt threatened" by Morant's words.

On March 6, 2023, the police department of Glendale, Colorado, started investigating Morant after he allegedly flashed a gun in a strip club on an Instagram live stream. Two days later, the department announced that Morant would not face criminal charges for the incident, stating they were "not able to determine that probable cause existed for the filing of any charges."

In 2025, a judge determined Morant was acting in self defense and dismissed the 2022 lawsuit over the punching incident.

In 2025, Morant was awarded $300,000 in damages from The Wing Guru, a restaurant chain, due to breach of contract.

== Media ==
On June 3, 2021, Morant released a six-episode documentary, Promiseland, focusing on his first NBA season.

Morant received a shout-out from rapper J. Cole on the song "My Life" from Cole's 2021 album The Off-Season. On June 1, 2021, rapper Moneybagg Yo released the song "Rookie of the Year" in celebration of Morant being named NBA Rookie of the Year. The song reflects on Morant's "underdog mentality and praises his rise from a little known college freshman to being named NBA Rookie of the Year in 2019–20".

== See also ==
- List of people banned or suspended by the NBA
