= Terrell Miller (footballer) =

English footballer (born 1994)

Personal information
- Full name: Terrell Christopher Ashley Miller
- Date of birth: 16 December 1994 (age 31)
- Place of birth: London, England
- Height: 1.78 m (5 ft 10 in)
- Position: Left winger

Team information
- Current team: Redbridge

Youth career
- 2010–2011: Peterborough United
- 2011–2012: Stevenage

Senior career*
Years	Team	Apps	(Gls)
2013	Watford	0	(0)
2013–2014	Hemel Hempstead Town	0	(0)
	Leverstock Green	1	(1)
	Braintree Town	0	(0)
	Maidenhead United	0	(0)
2014–2015	Kings Langley		
2015–2016	Shoreham		
2016–	Redbridge		

International career^{‡}
2012–2019	Montserrat	5	(0)
- * Club domestic league appearances and goals as of 07:39, 9 August 2018 (UTC) ‡ National team caps and goals as of 18:01, 25 March 2021 (UTC)

Terrell Christopher Ashley Miller (born 16 December 1994) is a footballer who plays for Redbridge as a left winger.

Born in England, he represented Montserrat at international level.

== Club career ==
Miller has played for Peterborough United, Stevenage, Watford, Hemel Hempstead Town, Leverstock Green, Braintree Town, Maidenhead United, Kings Langley, Shoreham and Redbridge.

In July 2015 he made a five-minute substitute appearance as a triallist for Scottish club Partick Thistle, in a friendly match.

== International career ==
He made his international debut for Montserrat in 2012, and competed in 2012 Caribbean Cup qualification.
