= Kevin Pittsnogle =

American basketball player (born 1984)

Personal information
- Born: July 30, 1984 (age 42) Martinsburg, West Virginia, U.S.
- Listed height: 6 ft 11 in (2.11 m)
- Listed weight: 250 lb (113 kg)

Career information
- High school: Martinsburg (Martinsburg, West Virginia)
- College: West Virginia (2002–2006)
- NBA draft: 2006: undrafted
- Playing career: 2006–2008
- Position: Power forward / center
- Number: 34, 3

Career history
- 2006–2007: Pittsburgh Xplosion
- 2007–2008: Austin Toros
- 2008: Albuquerque Thunderbirds

Career highlights
- CBA All-Rookie Team (2007); Third-team All-American – NABC (2006); First-team All-Big East (2006); Big East All-Rookie team (2003)

Kevin Lee Pittsnogle Jr. (born July 30, 1984) is an American former professional basketball player. He played for the Pittsburgh Xplosion of the CBA and the Austin Toros and the Albuquerque Thunderbirds of the NBA D-League. He is best known for his collegiate play at West Virginia University.

== College career ==
A forward from Martinsburg, West Virginia, Pittsnogle made an impact in his first year at West Virginia University, particularly against Rutgers on January 26, 2003, when he posted 26 points. He also added 24 points against Syracuse on February 8, 2003.

Until late in the 2004–05 season, Pittsnogle primarily came off the bench for the Mountaineers. However, on February 5, 2005, starting center D'or Fischer was unable to play against Pitt due to illness. Fischer was replaced in the starting lineup by Pittsnogle, who proceeded to score 27 points in an upset of the Panthers. He remained in the starting lineup for the rest of the season, and quickly came to the forefront during the 2005 NCAA Tournament, when on March 24, 2005, he scored 22 points and grabbed 8 rebounds in a 65–60 victory against Texas Tech in the Sweet 16 round, and then scored a team-high 25 points (on 9-for-15 shooting) and grabbed 5 rebounds in a 93–85 overtime loss to Louisville on March 26.

Pittsnogle declared for the 2005 NBA draft. He did not hire an agent, which meant that he still had the option to reverse his decision. He ultimately decided to withdraw from the draft and return to WVU for his senior year.

His collegiate career came to an end following a 74–71 loss to Texas in the Sweet 16 of the 2006 NCAA Tournament. Pittsnogle, having just returned from a bloody nose, tied the game with 5 seconds remaining with his fifth three-pointer, but Texas guard Kenton Paulino hit a three-pointer at the buzzer for the win.

Pittsnogle has the 6th most points in a career (1,708), the 2nd best 3-point field goal percentage in a career (41.1%), the 25th most rebounds in a career (563), the most games played in a career (128) and the ninth most games started in a career (105) in school history.

== Professional career ==
Expected to be taken in the 2006 NBA draft, neither Pittsnogle nor his teammate, shooting guard Mike Gansey, were chosen by any teams. Although Pittsnogle was predicted in most mock drafts as being chosen in the early-to-mid second round, he went undrafted and thus became a free agent. On July 25, 2006, Pittsnogle signed a two-year contract with the Boston Celtics, but he was waived on October 20. On November 8, 2006, Pittsnogle signed with the CBA's Pittsburgh Xplosion.

Pittsnogle was selected to the CBA All-Star game on February 6, after posting 23.5 points per game. Pittsnogle currently holds the CBA single-game record for points scored with 44, which he accomplished earlier in his rookie season. On March 9, 2007, the Xplosion placed him on the team's inactive reserve list due to tendinitis in his non-shooting elbow. He earned CBA All-Rookie Team honors.

Pittsnogle played for the NBA's Cleveland Cavaliers on their Summer League team in early July 2007. On July 23, 2007, Pittsnogle signed with French Pro A league team Cholet Basket, but was cut one week before the start of the season.

Pittsnogle was selected 12th overall by the NBA Development League's Austin Toros in the 2007 D-League draft. He was waived by Austin on January 9, 2008. He was picked up by the Albuquerque Thunderbirds on January 13, 2008.

In summer 2008, Pittsnogle has placed his basketball aspirations on hold and, as of January 2009, was working as a middle school teacher and unpaid assistant high school coach. Pittsnogle's weight increased to over 300 lbs, causing most scouts to tell him he was in inappropriate shape to return to even semi-professional basketball leagues. In the fall of 2008, Pittsnogle learned he had a thyroid condition that slowed his metabolism, which might be partially responsible for his weight gain. Medication played a role in his successful effort to lose 25 pounds. Currently, he lives with his wife and seven children in his home town of Martinsburg.

Pittsnogle attempted a comeback in the fall of 2009 when he joined the D-League's Albuquerque Thunderbirds, but after some success on the court, retired again on February 16, 2010, for personal reasons.

In late 2010, Pittsnogle joined a semipro team based in Winchester, Virginia. In 2012, he became a member of a semipro team based in Jefferson County, West Virginia.

== Personal life ==
Following Pittsnogle's basketball career, he became a car dealer in his hometown, worked as a special education teacher, high school basketball coach, and most recently as a principal at John Kerr Elementary School in Winchester Virginia. Pittsnogle resides in his hometown of Martinsburg, West Virginia with his wife, and their combined eight kids.

== Awards and accomplishments ==
- Big East Academic All-Star
- Finalist for the 2003 USA Basketball Junior World Championship team
- Named to 2007 CBA All-Star Team
- Named to 2007 CBA All Rookie Team
- 2020 xReiLox Fantasy League Runner-Up
